= 82nd United States Congress =

1951–1953 U.S. Congress

←	81st	83rd	→
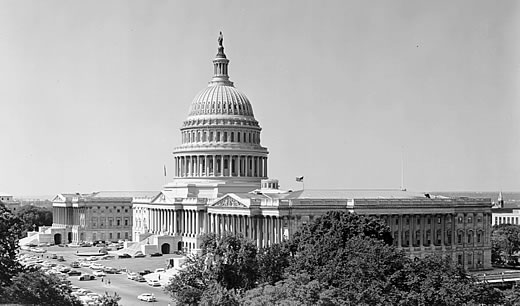
- United States Capitol (1956)

Overview
- Legislative body: United States Congress
- Jurisdiction: United States
- Term: January 3, 1951 – January 3, 1953

Senate
- Members: 96
- President: Alben W. Barkley (D)
- President pro tempore: Kenneth McKellar (D)
- Party control: Democratic

House of Representatives
- Members: 435 representatives 3 non-voting delegates
- Speaker: Sam Rayburn (D)
- Party control: Democratic

Sessions
- 1st: January 3, 1951 – October 20, 1951
- 2nd: January 8, 1952 – July 7, 1952

The 82nd United States Congress was a meeting of the legislative branch of the United States federal government, composed of the United States Senate and the United States House of Representatives. It met in Washington, D.C., from January 3, 1951, to January 3, 1953, during the last two years of President Harry S. Truman's second term in office.

The apportionment of seats in this House of Representatives was based on the 1940 United States census.

Both chambers had a Democratic majority (albeit reduced from the 81st Congress), and with President Truman, maintained an overall federal government trifecta.

== Major events ==
- March 29, 1951: Ethel and Julius Rosenberg were convicted of conspiracy to commit espionage. On April 5 they were sentenced to receive the death penalty.
- April 11, 1951: President Truman relieved General Douglas MacArthur of his Far Eastern commands.
- April 13, 1951: Congress passed a large defense budget 372 votes for the budget and 44 votes against the budget. The budget was intended to help the United States combat communism.
- August 31, 1951: The United States Senate passes the Mutual Security Act by a vote of 61 votes in favor and 5 votes against. The act provided $7.5 billion for foreign military assistance and food aid to America's allies, primarily the United Kingdom. The vote was condemned by the government of the Soviet Union and praised by the government of the United Kingdom.
- September 5, 1951: Treaty of San Francisco: In San Francisco, California, 48 nations signed a peace treaty with Japan to formally end the Pacific War.
- October 24, 1951: President Truman declared an official end to war with Germany.
- November 10, 1951: Direct dial coast-to-coast telephone service began in the United States.
- December 31, 1951: The Marshall Plan expired after distributing more than $13.3 billion USD in foreign aid to rebuild Europe.
- March 29, 1952: President Truman announced that he will not seek reelection.
- June 19, 1952: The Special Forces created.
- July 25, 1952: Puerto Rico became a Commonwealth of the United States, an unincorporated organized territory, with the ratification of its constitution.
- November 4, 1952: 1952 United States presidential election: Republican Dwight D. Eisenhower defeated Democrat Adlai Stevenson
- November 4, 1952: National Security Agency founded.

== Major legislation ==
- October 10, 1951: Mutual Security Act, ch. 479, 65 Stat. 373
- June 25, 1952: Federal-Aid Highway Act of 1952, 66 Stat. 158, Pub. L. 82–415
- June 27, 1952: Immigration and Nationality Act (McCarran-Walter Act), Pub. L. 82–414
- July 14, 1952: McGuire Act, Pub. L. 82–542, 15 U.S.C. § 42(a)
- July 16, 1952: Veterans' Readjustment Assistance Act, Pub. L. 82–550
- July 16, 1952: Federal Coal Mine Safety Act of 1952, Pub. L. 82–552
- July 16, 1952: Wire Fraud Act of 1952, Pub. L. 82–555

== Constitutional amendments ==
- February 27, 1951: Twenty-second Amendment to the United States Constitution, setting a term limit for election and overall time of service to the office of President of the United States, was ratified by the requisite number of states (then 36) to become part of the Constitution

== Treaties ==
Members of the Japanese delegation signing the Treaty of San Francisco.

- March 20, 1952: Treaty of San Francisco ratified

== Party summary ==
=== Senate ===
	Party (Shading indicates majority caucus)			Total	Vacant
	Democratic	Independent	Republican	Total	Vacant
End of previous Congress	53	0	43	96	0
Begin	49	0	47	96	0
March 8, 1951	48	0	47	95	1
March 19, 1951	49	0	47	96	0
April 18, 1951	49	0	46	95	1
April 23, 1951	50	0	46	96	0
November 29, 1951	50	0	45	95	1
December 10, 1951	50	0	46	96	0
July 28, 1952	49	0	46	95	1
August 29, 1952	49	0	47	96	0
November 5, 1952	47	0	49	96	0
December 31, 1952	47	0	48	95	1
Latest voting share	49%	0%	51%		
Beginning of the next Congress	47	1	48	96	0

=== House of Representatives ===
	Party (Shading indicates majority caucus)				Total	Vacant
	Democratic	Independent	Republican	Other	Total	Vacant
End of previous Congress	259	0	168	2	429	6
Begin	235	1	199	0	435	0
End	228	1	198	0	427	8
Final voting share	53.4%	0.2%	46.4%	0.0%		
Beginning of next Congress	211	1	221	0	433	2

== Leadership ==
=== Senate ===
Senate President

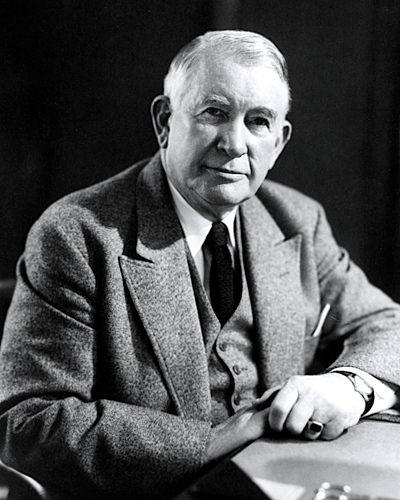
Alben W. Barkley (D)

Senate President pro tempore

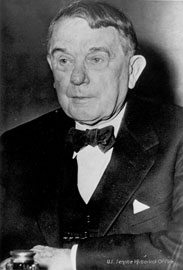
Kenneth McKellar (D)

- President: Alben W. Barkley (D)
- President pro tempore: Kenneth McKellar (D)

==== Majority (Democratic) party ====
- Majority leader: Ernest McFarland
- Majority whip: Lyndon B. Johnson
- Democratic Caucus Secretary: Brien McMahon
- Policy Committee Chairman: Ernest McFarland

==== Minority (Republican) party ====
- Minority leader: Kenneth S. Wherry, until November 29, 1951
  - Styles Bridges, from January 8, 1952
- Minority whip: Leverett Saltonstall
- Republican Conference Chairman: Eugene Millikin
- Republican Conference Secretary: Milton Young
- National Senatorial Committee Chair: Owen Brewster
- Policy Committee Chairman: Robert A. Taft

=== House of Representatives ===
House Speaker

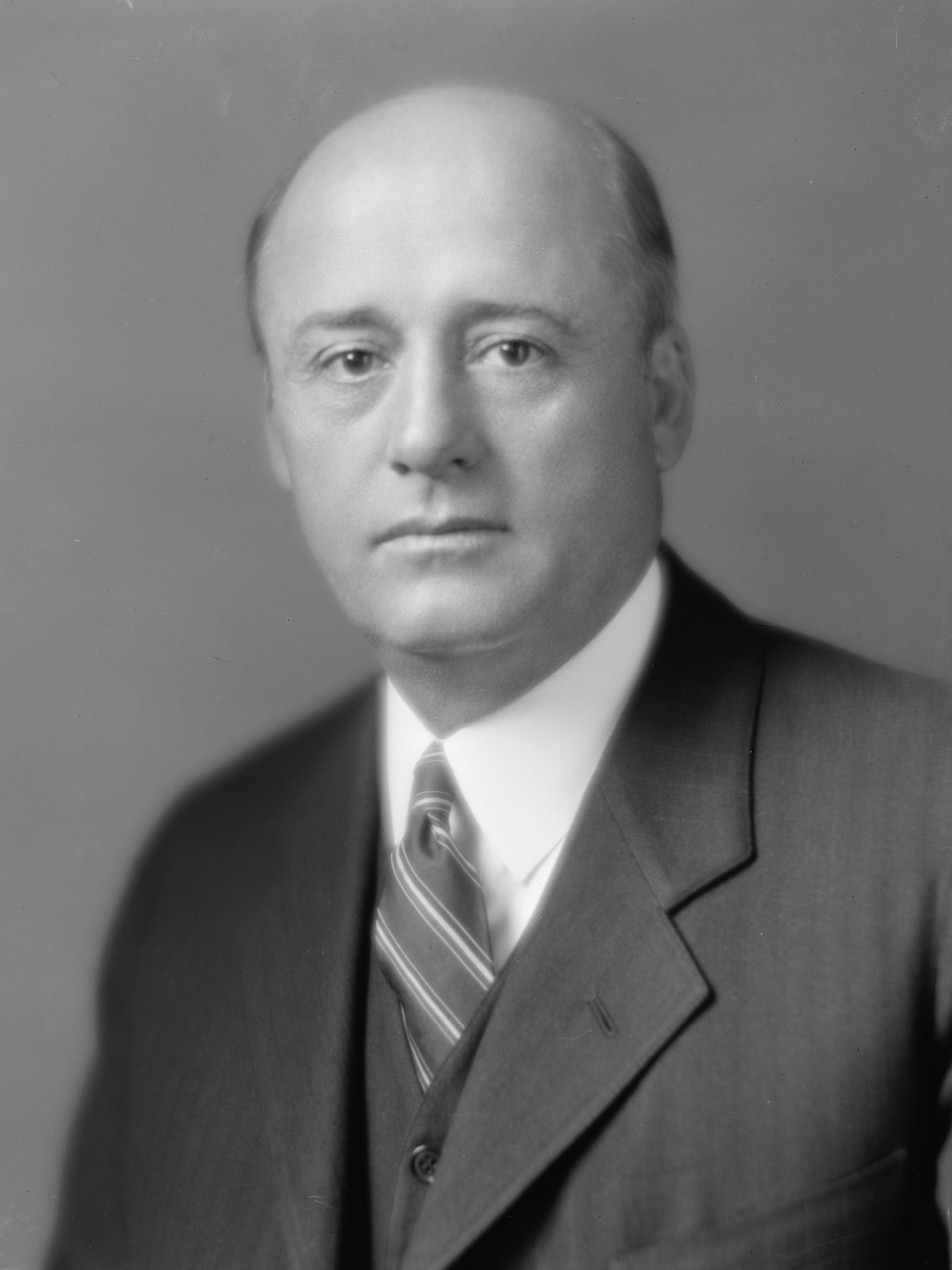
House Speaker
Sam Rayburn (D)

- Speaker: Sam Rayburn (D)

==== Majority (Democratic) party ====
- Majority leader: John W. McCormack
- Majority whip: J. Percy Priest
- Democratic Caucus Chairman: Jere Cooper
- Democratic Campaign Committee Chairman: Michael J. Kirwan

==== Minority (Republican) party ====
- Minority leader: Joseph W. Martin Jr.
- Minority whip: Leslie C. Arends
- Republican Conference Chairman: Clifford R. Hope
- Policy Committee Chairman: Joseph W. Martin Jr.
- Republican Campaign Committee Chairman: Leonard Hall

== Caucuses ==
- House Democratic Caucus
- Senate Democratic Caucus

== Members ==
=== Senate ===
Senators are popularly elected statewide every two years, with one-third beginning new six-year terms with each Congress. Preceding the names in the list below are Senate class numbers, which indicate the cycle of their election, In this Congress, Class 1 meant their term ended with this Congress, facing re-election in 1952; Class 2 meant their term began in the last Congress, facing re-election in 1954; and Class 3 meant their term began in this Congress, facing re-election in 1956.

==== Alabama ====
▌2. John Sparkman (D)
▌3. J. Lister Hill (D)

==== Arizona ====
▌1. Ernest McFarland (D)
▌3. Carl Hayden (D)

==== Arkansas ====
▌2. John L. McClellan (D)
▌3. J. William Fulbright (D)

==== California ====
▌1. William Knowland (R)
▌3. Richard Nixon (R), until January 1, 1953

▌Thomas Kuchel (R), from January 2, 1953

==== Colorado ====
▌2. Edwin C. Johnson (D)
▌3. Eugene Millikin (R)

==== Connecticut ====
▌1. William Benton (D)
▌3. Brien McMahon (D), until July 28, 1952

▌William A. Purtell (R), August 29, 1952 – November 4, 1952
▌Prescott Bush (R), from November 5, 1952

==== Delaware ====
▌1. John J. Williams (R)
▌2. J. Allen Frear Jr. (D)

==== Florida ====
▌1. Spessard Holland (D)
▌3. George Smathers (D)

==== Georgia ====
▌3. Walter F. George (D)
▌2. Richard Russell Jr. (D)

==== Idaho ====
▌2. Henry Dworshak (R)
▌3. Herman Welker (R)

==== Illinois ====
▌2. Paul Douglas (D)
▌3. Everett Dirksen (R)

==== Indiana ====
▌1. William E. Jenner (R)
▌3. Homer E. Capehart (R)

==== Iowa ====
▌2. Guy Gillette (D)
▌3. Bourke B. Hickenlooper (R)

==== Kansas ====
▌2. Andrew Frank Schoeppel (R)
▌3. Frank Carlson (R)

==== Kentucky ====
▌2. Virgil Chapman (D), until March 8, 1951

▌Thomas R. Underwood (D), March 19, 1951 – November 4, 1952
▌John Sherman Cooper (R), from November 5, 1952

▌3. Earle Clements (D)

==== Louisiana ====
▌2. Allen J. Ellender (D)
▌3. Russell B. Long (D)

==== Maine ====
▌1. Ralph Owen Brewster (R), until December 31, 1952
▌2. Margaret Chase Smith (R)

==== Maryland ====
▌1. Herbert O'Conor (D)
▌3. John Marshall Butler (R)

==== Massachusetts ====
▌1. Henry Cabot Lodge Jr. (R)
▌2. Leverett Saltonstall (R)

==== Michigan ====
▌1. Arthur Vandenberg (R), until April 18, 1951

▌Blair Moody (D), April 23, 1951 – November 4, 1952
▌Charles E. Potter (R), from November 5, 1952

▌2. Homer S. Ferguson (R)

==== Minnesota ====
▌1. Edward John Thye (R)
▌2. Hubert Humphrey (DFL) (Note: The Minnesota Democratic–Farmer–Labor Party (DFL) is the Minnesota affiliate of the U.S. Democratic Party and are counted as Democrats.)

==== Mississippi ====
▌1. John C. Stennis (D)
▌2. James Eastland (D)

==== Missouri ====
▌1. James P. Kem (R)
▌3. Thomas C. Hennings Jr. (D)

==== Montana ====
▌1. Zales Ecton (R)
▌2. James E. Murray (D)

==== Nebraska ====
▌1. Hugh A. Butler (R)
▌2. Kenneth S. Wherry (R), until November 29, 1951

▌Fred A. Seaton (R), December 10, 1951 – November 4, 1952
▌Dwight Griswold (R), from November 5, 1952

==== Nevada ====
▌1. George W. Malone (R)
▌3. Patrick A. McCarran (D)

==== New Hampshire ====
▌2. Styles Bridges (R)
▌3. Charles W. Tobey (R)

==== New Jersey ====
▌1. Howard Alexander Smith (R)
▌2. Robert C. Hendrickson (R)

==== New Mexico ====
▌1. Dennis Chávez (D)
▌2. Clinton P. Anderson (D)

==== New York ====
▌1. Irving Ives (R)
▌3. Herbert H. Lehman (D)

==== North Carolina ====
▌2. Willis Smith (D)
▌3. Clyde R. Hoey (D)

==== North Dakota ====
▌1. William Langer (R-NPL)
▌3. Milton Young (R)

==== Ohio ====
▌1. John W. Bricker (R)
▌3. Robert A. Taft (R)

==== Oklahoma ====
▌2. Robert S. Kerr (D)
▌3. A. S. Mike Monroney (D)

==== Oregon ====
▌2. Guy Cordon (R)
▌3. Wayne Morse (R)

==== Pennsylvania ====
▌1. Edward Martin (R)
▌3. James H. Duff (R)

==== Rhode Island ====
▌1. John Pastore (D)
▌2. Theodore F. Green (D)

==== South Carolina ====
▌2. Burnet R. Maybank (D)
▌3. Olin D. Johnston (D)

==== South Dakota ====
▌2. Karl E. Mundt (R)
▌3. Francis Case (R)

==== Tennessee ====
▌1. Kenneth McKellar (D)
▌2. Estes Kefauver (D)

==== Texas ====
▌1. Tom T. Connally (D)
▌2. Lyndon B. Johnson (D)

==== Utah ====
▌1. Arthur Vivian Watkins (R)
▌3. Wallace F. Bennett (R)

==== Vermont ====
▌1. Ralph Flanders (R)
▌3. George Aiken (R)

==== Virginia ====
▌1. Harry F. Byrd (D)
▌2. A. Willis Robertson (D)

==== Washington ====
▌1. Harry P. Cain (R)
▌3. Warren G. Magnuson (D)

==== West Virginia ====
▌1. Harley M. Kilgore (D)
▌2. Matthew M. Neely (D)

==== Wisconsin ====
▌1. Joseph McCarthy (R)
▌3. Alexander Wiley (R)

==== Wyoming ====
▌1. Joseph C. O'Mahoney (D)
▌2. Lester C. Hunt (D)

Senators' party membership by state at the opening of the 82nd Congress in January 1951 2 Democrats 1 Democrat and 1 Republican 2 Republicans

=== House of Representatives ===
The names of representatives are preceded by their district numbers.

==== Alabama ====
▌1. Frank W. Boykin (D)
▌2. George M. Grant (D)
▌3. George W. Andrews (D)
▌4. Kenneth A. Roberts (D)
▌5. Albert Rains (D)
▌6. Edward deGraffenried (D)
▌7. Carl Elliott (D)
▌8. Robert E. Jones Jr. (D)
▌9. Laurie C. Battle (D)

==== Arizona ====
▌1. John R. Murdock (D)
▌2. Harold Patten (D)

==== Arkansas ====
▌1. Ezekiel C. Gathings (D)
▌2. Wilbur Mills (D)
▌3. James William Trimble (D)
▌4. Boyd Anderson Tackett (D)
▌5. Brooks Hays (D)
▌6. William F. Norrell (D)
▌7. Oren Harris (D)

==== California ====
▌1. Hubert B. Scudder (R)
▌2. Clair Engle (D)
▌3. J. Leroy Johnson (R)
▌4. Franck R. Havenner (D)
▌5. John F. Shelley (D)
▌6. George P. Miller (D)
▌7. John J. Allen Jr. (R)
▌8. Jack Z. Anderson (R)
▌9. Allan O. Hunter (R)
▌10. Thomas H. Werdel (R)
▌11. Ernest K. Bramblett (R)
▌12. Patrick J. Hillings (R)
▌13. Norris Poulson (R)
▌14. Sam Yorty (D)
▌15. Gordon L. McDonough (R)
▌16. Donald L. Jackson (R)
▌17. Cecil R. King (D)
▌18. Clyde Doyle (D)
▌19. Chester E. Holifield (D)
▌20. John Carl Hinshaw (R)
▌21. Harry R. Sheppard (D)
▌22. John R. Phillips (R)
▌23. Clinton D. McKinnon (D)

==== Colorado ====
▌1. Byron G. Rogers (D)
▌2. William S. Hill (R)
▌3. John Chenoweth (R)
▌4. Wayne N. Aspinall (D)

==== Connecticut ====
▌1. Abraham Ribicoff (D)
▌2. Horace Seely-Brown Jr. (R)
▌3. John A. McGuire (D)
▌4. Albert P. Morano (R)
▌5. James T. Patterson (R)
▌At-large. Antoni Sadlak (R)

==== Delaware ====
▌At large. J. Caleb Boggs (R)

==== Florida ====
▌1. Chester B. McMullen (D)
▌2. Charles E. Bennett (D)
▌3. Robert L. F. Sikes (D)
▌4. Bill Lantaff (D)
▌5. Syd Herlong (D)
▌6. Dwight L. Rogers (D)

==== Georgia ====
▌1. Prince Hulon Preston Jr. (D)
▌2. E. Eugene Cox (D), until December 24, 1952
▌3. Tic Forrester (D)
▌4. Albert Sidney Camp (D)
▌5. James C. Davis (D)
▌6. Carl Vinson (D)
▌7. Henderson Lovelace Lanham (D)
▌8. William McDonald Wheeler (D)
▌9. John S. Wood (D)
▌10. Paul Brown (D)

==== Idaho ====
▌1. John Travers Wood (R)
▌2. Hamer Budge (R)

==== Illinois ====
▌1. William L. Dawson (D)
▌2. Richard B. Vail (R)
▌3. Fred E. Busbey (R)
▌4. William E. McVey (R)
▌5. John C. Kluczynski (D)
▌6. Thomas J. O'Brien (D)
▌7. Adolph J. Sabath (D), until November 6, 1952
▌8. Thomas S. Gordon (D)
▌9. Sidney R. Yates (D)
▌10. Richard W. Hoffman (R)
▌11. Timothy P. Sheehan (R)
▌12. Edgar A. Jonas (R)
▌13. Marguerite S. Church (R)
▌14. Chauncey W. Reed (R)
▌15. Noah M. Mason (R)
▌16. Leo E. Allen (R)
▌17. Leslie C. Arends (R)
▌18. Harold H. Velde (R)
▌19. Robert B. Chiperfield (R)
▌20. Sid Simpson (R)
▌21. Peter F. Mack Jr. (D)
▌22. William L. Springer (R)
▌23. Edward H. Jenison (R)
▌24. Charles W. Vursell (R)
▌25. Melvin Price (D)
▌26. C. W. Bishop (R)

==== Indiana ====
▌1. Ray Madden (D)
▌2. Charles A. Halleck (R)
▌3. Shepard J. Crumpacker Jr. (R)
▌4. E. Ross Adair (R)
▌5. John V. Beamer (R)
▌6. Cecil M. Harden (R)
▌7. William G. Bray (R)
▌8. Winfield K. Denton (D)
▌9. Earl Wilson (R)
▌10. Ralph Harvey (R)
▌11. Charles B. Brownson (R)

==== Iowa ====
▌1. Thomas E. Martin (R)
▌2. Henry O. Talle (R)
▌3. H. R. Gross (R)
▌4. Karl M. LeCompte (R)
▌5. Paul H. Cunningham (R)
▌6. James I. Dolliver (R)
▌7. Ben F. Jensen (R)
▌8. Charles B. Hoeven (R)

==== Kansas ====
▌1. Albert M. Cole (R)
▌2. Errett P. Scrivner (R)
▌3. Myron V. George (R)
▌4. Edward Herbert Rees (R)
▌5. Clifford R. Hope (R)
▌6. Wint Smith (R)

==== Kentucky ====
▌1. Noble J. Gregory (D)
▌2. John A. Whitaker (D), until December 15, 1951

▌Garrett Withers (D), from August 2, 1952

▌3. Thruston Ballard Morton (R)
▌4. Frank Chelf (D)
▌5. Brent Spence (D)
▌6. Thomas R. Underwood (D), until March 17, 1951

▌John C. Watts (D), from April 14, 1951

▌7. Carl D. Perkins (D)
▌8. Joe B. Bates (D)
▌9. James S. Golden (R)

==== Louisiana ====
▌1. F. Edward Hébert (D)
▌2. Hale Boggs (D)
▌3. Edwin E. Willis (D)
▌4. Overton Brooks (D)
▌5. Otto Passman (D)
▌6. James H. Morrison (D)
▌7. Henry D. Larcade Jr. (D)
▌8. A. Leonard Allen (D)

==== Maine ====
▌1. Robert Hale (R)
▌2. Charles P. Nelson (R)
▌3. Frank Fellows (R), until August 27, 1951

▌Clifford McIntire (R), from October 22, 1951

==== Maryland ====
▌1. Edward Tylor Miller (R)
▌2. James Devereux (R)
▌3. Edward Garmatz (D)
▌4. George Hyde Fallon (D)
▌5. Lansdale G. Sasscer (D)
▌6. James Glenn Beall (R)

==== Massachusetts ====
▌1. John W. Heselton (R)
▌2. Foster Furcolo (D), until September 30, 1952
▌3. Philip J. Philbin (D)
▌4. Harold Donohue (D)
▌5. Edith Nourse Rogers (R)
▌6. William H. Bates (R)
▌7. Thomas J. Lane (D)
▌8. Angier Goodwin (R)
▌9. Donald W. Nicholson (R)
▌10. Christian Herter (R)
▌11. John F. Kennedy (D)
▌12. John W. McCormack (D)
▌13. Richard B. Wigglesworth (R)
▌14. Joseph W. Martin Jr. (R)

==== Michigan ====
▌1. Thaddeus M. Machrowicz (D)
▌2. George Meader (R)
▌3. Paul W. Shafer (R)
▌4. Clare E. Hoffman (R)
▌5. Gerald Ford (R)
▌6. William W. Blackney (R)
▌7. Jesse P. Wolcott (R)
▌8. Fred L. Crawford (R)
▌9. Ruth Thompson (R)
▌10. Roy O. Woodruff (R)
▌11. Charles E. Potter (R), until November 4, 1952
▌12. John B. Bennett (R)
▌13. George D. O'Brien (D)
▌14. Louis C. Rabaut (D)
▌15. John D. Dingell Sr. (D)
▌16. John Lesinski Jr. (D)
▌17. George Anthony Dondero (R)

==== Minnesota ====
▌1. August H. Andresen (R)
▌2. Joseph P. O'Hara (R)
▌3. Roy Wier (DFL)
▌4. Eugene McCarthy (DFL)
▌5. Walter Judd (R)
▌6. Fred Marshall (DFL)
▌7.Herman Carl Andersen (R)
▌8. John Blatnik (DFL)
▌9. Harold Hagen (R)

==== Mississippi ====
▌1. John E. Rankin (D)
▌2. Jamie Whitten (D)
▌3. Frank Ellis Smith (D)
▌4. Thomas Abernethy (D)
▌5. W. Arthur Winstead (D)
▌6. William M. Colmer (D)
▌7. John Bell Williams (D)

==== Missouri ====
▌1. Clare Magee (D)
▌2. Morgan M. Moulder (D)
▌3. Phil J. Welch (D)
▌4. Leonard Irving (D)
▌5. Richard Walker Bolling (D)
▌6. Orland K. Armstrong (R)
▌7. Dewey Short (R)
▌8. A. S. J. Carnahan (D)
▌9. Clarence Cannon (D)
▌10. Paul C. Jones (D)
▌11. John B. Sullivan (D), until January 29, 1951

▌Claude I. Bakewell (R), from March 9, 1951

▌12. Thomas B. Curtis (R)
▌13. Frank M. Karsten (D)

==== Montana ====
▌1. Mike Mansfield (D)
▌2. Wesley A. D'Ewart (R)

==== Nebraska ====
▌1. Carl Curtis (R)
▌2. Howard Buffett (R)
▌3. Karl Stefan (R), until October 2, 1951

▌Robert Dinsmore Harrison (R), from December 4, 1951

▌4. Arthur L. Miller (R)

==== Nevada ====
▌At-large. Walter S. Baring Jr. (D)

==== New Hampshire ====
▌1. Chester Earl Merrow (R)
▌2. Norris Cotton (R)

==== New Jersey ====
▌1. Charles A. Wolverton (R)
▌2. T. Millet Hand (R)
▌3. James C. Auchincloss (R)
▌4. Charles R. Howell (D)
▌5. Charles A. Eaton (R)
▌6. Clifford P. Case (R)
▌7. William B. Widnall (R)
▌8. Gordon Canfield (R)
▌9. Harry L. Towe (R), until September 7, 1951

▌Frank C. Osmers Jr. (R), from November 6, 1951

▌10. Peter W. Rodino (D)
▌11. Hugh Joseph Addonizio (D)
▌12. Robert Kean (R)
▌13. Alfred Dennis Sieminski (D)
▌14. Edward J. Hart (D)

==== New Mexico ====
▌At-large. John J. Dempsey (D)
▌At-large. Antonio M. Fernández (D)

==== New York ====
▌1. Ernest Greenwood (D)
▌2. Leonard Hall (R), until December 31, 1952
▌3. Henry J. Latham (R)
▌4. L. Gary Clemente (D)
▌5. T. Vincent Quinn (D), until December 30, 1951

▌Robert Tripp Ross (R), from February 19, 1952

▌6. James J. Delaney (D)
▌7. Louis B. Heller (D)
▌8. Victor Anfuso (D)
▌9. Eugene J. Keogh (D)
▌10. Edna F. Kelly (D)
▌11. James J. Heffernan (D)
▌12. John J. Rooney (D)
▌13. Donald L. O'Toole (D)
▌14. Abraham J. Multer (D)
▌15. Emanuel Celler (D)
▌16. James J. Murphy (D)
▌17. Frederic René Coudert Jr. (R)
▌18. James G. Donovan (D)
▌19. Arthur George Klein (D)
▌20. Franklin Delano Roosevelt Jr. (D)
▌21. Jacob Javits (R)
▌22. Adam Clayton Powell Jr. (D)
▌23. Sidney A. Fine (D)
▌24. Isidore Dollinger (D)
▌25. Charles A. Buckley (D)
▌26. Christopher C. McGrath (D)
▌27. Ralph W. Gwinn (R)
▌28. Ralph A. Gamble (R)
▌29. Katharine St. George (R)
▌30. J. Ernest Wharton (R)
▌31. Bernard W. Kearney (R)
▌32. William T. Byrne (D), until January 27, 1952

▌Leo W. O'Brien (D), from April 1, 1952

▌33. Dean P. Taylor (R)
▌34. Clarence E. Kilburn (R)
▌35. William R. Williams (R)
▌36. R. Walter Riehlman (R)
▌37. Edwin Arthur Hall (R)
▌38. John Taber (R)
▌39. W. Sterling Cole (R)
▌40. Kenneth Keating (R)
▌41. Harold C. Ostertag (R)
▌42. William E. Miller (R)
▌43. Edmund P. Radwan (R)
▌44. John Cornelius Butler (R)
▌45. Daniel A. Reed (R)

==== North Carolina ====
▌1. Herbert Covington Bonner (D)
▌2. John H. Kerr (D)
▌3. Graham A. Barden (D)
▌4. Harold D. Cooley (D)
▌5. Richard Thurmond Chatham (D)
▌6. Carl T. Durham (D)
▌7. Frank Ertel Carlyle (D)
▌8. Charles B. Deane (D)
▌9. Robert L. Doughton (D)
▌10. Hamilton C. Jones (D)
▌11. Woodrow W. Jones (D)
▌12. Monroe Minor Redden (D)

==== North Dakota ====
▌At-large. Fred G. Aandahl (R)
▌At-large. Usher L. Burdick (R-NPL)

==== Ohio ====
▌1. Charles H. Elston (R)
▌2. William E. Hess (R)
▌3. Edward G. Breen (D), until October 1, 1951

▌Paul F. Schenck (R), from November 6, 1951

▌4. William Moore McCulloch (R)
▌5. Cliff Clevenger (R)
▌6. James G. Polk (D)
▌7. Clarence J. Brown (R)
▌8. Jackson Edward Betts (R)
▌9. Frazier Reams (I)
▌10. Thomas A. Jenkins (R)
▌11. Walter E. Brehm (R)
▌12. John M. Vorys (R)
▌13. Alvin F. Weichel (R)
▌14. William Hanes Ayres (R)
▌15. Robert T. Secrest (D)
▌16. Frank T. Bow (R)
▌17. J. Harry McGregor (R)
▌18. Wayne Hays (D)
▌19. Michael J. Kirwan (D)
▌20. Michael A. Feighan (D)
▌21. Robert Crosser (D)
▌22. Frances P. Bolton (R)
▌At-large. George H. Bender (R)

==== Oklahoma ====
▌1. George B. Schwabe (R), until April 2, 1952
▌2. William G. Stigler (D), until August 21, 1952
▌3. Carl Albert (D)
▌4. Tom Steed (D)
▌5. John Jarman (D)
▌6. Toby Morris (D)
▌7. Victor Wickersham (D)
▌8. Page Belcher (R)

==== Oregon ====
▌1. A. Walter Norblad (R)
▌2. Lowell Stockman (R)
▌3. Homer D. Angell (R)
▌4. Harris Ellsworth (R)

==== Pennsylvania ====
▌1. William A. Barrett (D)
▌2. William T. Granahan (D)
▌3. Hardie Scott (R)
▌4. Earl Chudoff (D)
▌5. William J. Green Jr. (D)
▌6. Hugh Scott (R)
▌7. Benjamin F. James (R)
▌8. Albert C. Vaughn (R), until September 1, 1951

▌Karl C. King (R), from November 6, 1951

▌9. Paul B. Dague (R)
▌10. Harry P. O'Neill (D)
▌11. Dan Flood (D)
▌12. Ivor D. Fenton (R)
▌13. George M. Rhodes (D)
▌14. Wilson D. Gillette (R), until August 7, 1951

▌Joseph L. Carrigg (R), from November 6, 1951

▌15. Alvin Bush (R)
▌16. Samuel K. McConnell Jr. (R)
▌17. Richard M. Simpson (R)
▌18. Walter M. Mumma (R)
▌19. Leon H. Gavin (R)
▌20. Francis E. Walter (D)
▌21. James F. Lind (D)
▌22. James E. Van Zandt (R)
▌23. Edward L. Sittler Jr. (R)
▌24. Thomas E. Morgan (D)
▌25. Louis E. Graham (R)
▌26. John P. Saylor (R)
▌27. Augustine B. Kelley (D)
▌28. Carroll D. Kearns (R)
▌29. Harmar D. Denny Jr. (R)
▌30. Robert J. Corbett (R)
▌31. James G. Fulton (R)
▌32. Herman P. Eberharter (D)
▌33. Frank Buchanan (D), until April 27, 1951

▌Vera Buchanan (D), from July 24, 1951

==== Rhode Island ====
▌1. Aime Forand (D)
▌2. John E. Fogarty (D)

==== South Carolina ====
▌1. L. Mendel Rivers (D)
▌2. John J. Riley (D)
▌3. William Jennings Bryan Dorn (D)
▌4. Joseph R. Bryson (D)
▌5. James P. Richards (D)
▌6. John L. McMillan (D)

==== South Dakota ====
▌1. Harold Lovre (R)
▌2. Ellis Yarnal Berry (R)

==== Tennessee ====
▌1. B. Carroll Reece (R)
▌2. Howard Baker Sr. (R)
▌3. James B. Frazier Jr. (D)
▌4. Albert Gore Sr. (D)
▌5. Joe L. Evins (D)
▌6. Percy Priest (D)
▌7. James Patrick Sutton (D)
▌8. Tom J. Murray (D)
▌9. Jere Cooper (D)
▌10. Clifford Davis (D)

==== Texas ====
▌1. Wright Patman (D)
▌2. Jesse M. Combs (D)
▌3. Lindley Beckworth (D)
▌4. Sam Rayburn (D)
▌5. Joseph Franklin Wilson (D)
▌6. Olin E. Teague (D)
▌7. Tom Pickett (D), until June 30, 1952

▌John Dowdy (D), from September 23, 1952

▌8. Albert Thomas (D)
▌9. Clark W. Thompson (D)
▌10. Homer Thornberry (D)
▌11. William R. Poage (D)
▌12. Wingate H. Lucas (D)
▌13. Ed Gossett (D), until July 31, 1951

▌Frank N. Ikard (D), from September 8, 1951

▌14. John E. Lyle Jr. (D)
▌15. Lloyd Bentsen (D)
▌16. Kenneth M. Regan (D)
▌17. Omar Burleson (D)
▌18. Walter E. Rogers (D)
▌19. George H. Mahon (D)
▌20. Paul J. Kilday (D)
▌21. O. C. Fisher (D)

==== Utah ====
▌1. Walter K. Granger (D)
▌2. Reva Beck Bosone (D)

==== Vermont ====
▌At-large. Winston L. Prouty (R)

==== Virginia ====
▌1. Edward J. Robeson Jr. (D)
▌2. Porter Hardy Jr. (D)
▌3. J. Vaughan Gary (D)
▌4. Watkins Moorman Abbitt (D)
▌5. Thomas B. Stanley (D)
▌6. Clarence G. Burton (D)
▌7. Burr Harrison (D)
▌8. Howard W. Smith (D)
▌9. Thomas B. Fugate (D)

==== Washington ====
▌1. Hugh Mitchell (D)
▌2. Henry M. Jackson (D)
▌3. Russell V. Mack (R)
▌4. Hal Holmes (R)
▌5. Walt Horan (R)
▌6. Thor C. Tollefson (R)

==== West Virginia ====
▌1. Robert L. Ramsay (D)
▌2. Harley Orrin Staggers (D)
▌3. Cleveland M. Bailey (D)
▌4. Maurice G. Burnside (D)
▌5. John Kee (D), until May 8, 1951

▌Elizabeth Kee (D), from July 17, 1951

▌6. E. H. Hedrick (D)

==== Wisconsin ====
▌1. Lawrence H. Smith (R)
▌2. Glenn Robert Davis (R)
▌3. Gardner R. Withrow (R)
▌4. Clement J. Zablocki (D)
▌5. Charles J. Kersten (R)
▌6. William Van Pelt (R)
▌7. Reid F. Murray (R), until April 29, 1952
▌8. John W. Byrnes (R)
▌9. Merlin Hull (R)
▌10. Alvin O'Konski (R)

==== Wyoming ====
▌At-large. William Henry Harrison III (R)

==== Non-voting members ====
▌Alaska Territory. Bob Bartlett (D)
▌Hawaii Territory. Joseph Rider Farrington (R)
▌Puerto Rico. Antonio Fernós-Isern (PPD)

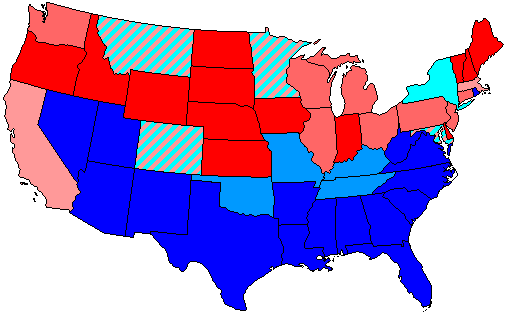
House seats by party holding plurality in state: 80+ to 100% Democratic / 80+ to 100% Republican; 60+ to 80% Democratic / 60+ to 80% Republican; Up to 60% Democratic / Up to 60% Republican

== Changes in membership ==
The count below reflects changes from the beginning of this Congress.

=== Senate ===
Senate changes
State (class)	Vacated by	Reason for change	Successor	Date of successor's formal installation (Note: When seated or oath administered, not necessarily when service began.)
Kentucky (2)	Virgil Chapman (D)	Died March 8, 1951. Successor appointed March 19, 1951, to continue the term.	Thomas R. Underwood (D)	March 19, 1951
Michigan (1)	Arthur Vandenberg (R)	Died April 18, 1951. Successor appointed April 23, 1951, to continue the term.	Blair Moody (D)	April 23, 1951
Nebraska (2)	Kenneth S. Wherry (R)	Died November 29, 1951. Successor appointed December 10, 1951, to continue the term.	Fred A. Seaton (R)	December 10, 1951
Connecticut (3)	Brien McMahon (D)	Died July 28, 1952. Successor appointed August 29, 1952, to continue the term.	William A. Purtell (R)	August 29, 1952
Connecticut (3)	William A. Purtell (R)	Retired upon special election. Successor elected November 4, 1952.	Prescott Bush (R)	November 5, 1952
Kentucky (2)	Thomas R. Underwood (D)	Lost election to finish the term. Successor elected November 4, 1952.	John Sherman Cooper (R)	November 5, 1952
Michigan (1)	Blair Moody (D)	Lost election to finish the term. Successor elected November 4, 1952.	Charles E. Potter (R)	November 5, 1952
Nebraska (2)	Fred A. Seaton (R)	Lost election to finish the term. Successor elected November 4, 1952.	Dwight Griswold (R)	November 5, 1952
Maine (1)	Owen Brewster (R)	Resigned December 31, 1952. Seat was not filled during this Congress.	Vacant	
California (3)	Richard Nixon (R)	Resigned January 1, 1953, after being elected U.S. Vice President. Successor appointed to continue the term.	Thomas Kuchel (R)	January 2, 1953

=== House of Representatives ===
House changes
District	Vacated by	Reason for change	Successor	Date of successor's formal installation
Missouri 11	John B. Sullivan (D)	Died January 29, 1951. Successor elected March 9, 1951.	Claude I. Bakewell (R)	March 9, 1951
Kentucky 6	Thomas R. Underwood (D)	Resigned March 17, 1951, after being appointed U.S. Senator. Successor elected April 4, 1951.	John C. Watts (D)	April 4, 1951
Pennsylvania 33	Frank Buchanan (D)	Died April 27, 1951. Successor elected July 24, 1951.	Vera Buchanan (D)	July 24, 1951
West Virginia 5	John Kee (D)	Died May 8, 1951. Successor elected July 17, 1951.	Elizabeth Kee (D)	July 17, 1951
Texas 13	Ed Gossett (D)	Resigned July 31, 1951. Successor elected September 8, 1951.	Frank N. Ikard (D)	September 8, 1951
Pennsylvania 14	Wilson D. Gillette (R)	Died August 7, 1951. Successor elected November 6, 1951.	Joseph L. Carrigg (R)	November 6, 1951
Maine 3	Frank Fellows (R)	Died August 27, 1951. Successor elected October 22, 1951.	Clifford McIntire (R)	October 22, 1951
Pennsylvania 8	Albert C. Vaughn (R)	Died September 1, 1951. Successor elected November 6, 1951.	Karl C. King (R)	November 6, 1951
New Jersey 9	Harry L. Towe (R)	Resigned September 7, 1951, to become Assistant Attorney General of New Jersey. Successor elected November 6, 1951.	Frank C. Osmers Jr. (R)	November 6, 1951
Ohio 3	Edward G. Breen (D)	Resigned October 1, 1951, due to ill health. Successor elected November 6, 1951.	Paul F. Schenck (R)	November 6, 1951
Nebraska 3	Karl Stefan (R)	Died October 2, 1951. Successor elected December 4, 1951.	Robert D. Harrison (R)	December 4, 1951
Kentucky 2	John A. Whitaker (D)	Died December 15, 1951. Successor elected August 2, 1952.	Garrett Withers (D)	August 2, 1952
New York 5	T. Vincent Quinn (D)	Resigned December 30, 1951, to become District Attorney of Queens County, New York. Successor elected February 19, 1952.	Robert T. Ross (R)	February 19, 1952
New York 32	William T. Byrne (D)	Died January 27, 1952. Successor elected April 1, 1952.	Leo W. O'Brien (D)	April 1, 1952
Oklahoma 1	George B. Schwabe (R)	Died April 2, 1952. Seat not filled during this Congress.	Vacant	
Wisconsin 7	Reid F. Murray (R)	Died April 29, 1952. Seat not filled during this Congress.	Vacant	
Texas 7	Tom Pickett (D)	Resigned June 30, 1952, to become Vice-President of the National Coal Association. Successor elected September 23, 1952.	John Dowdy (D)	September 23, 1952
Oklahoma 2	William G. Stigler (D)	Died August 21, 1952. Seat not filled during this Congress.	Vacant	
Massachusetts 2	Foster Furcolo (D)	Resigned September 30, 1952, to become Treasurer and Receiver-General of Massachusetts. Seat not filled during this Congress.	Vacant	
Michigan 11	Charles E. Potter (R)	Resigned November 4, 1952, after being elected U.S. Senator. Seat not filled during this Congress.	Vacant	
Illinois 7	Adolph J. Sabath (D)	Died November 6, 1952. Seat not filled during this Congress.	Vacant	
Georgia 2	E. Eugene Cox (D)	Died December 24, 1952. Seat not filled during this Congress.	Vacant	
New York 2	Leonard Hall (R)	Resigned December 31, 1952. Seat not filled during this Congress.	Vacant	

== Committees ==
Lists of committees and their party leaders for members of the House and Senate committees can be found through the Official Congressional Directory at the bottom of this article. The directory after the pages of terms of service lists committees of the Senate, House (Standing with Subcommittees, Select and Special) and Joint and, after that, House/Senate committee assignments. On the committees section of the House and Senate in the Official Congressional Directory, the committee's members on the first row on the left side shows the chairman of the committee and on the right side shows the ranking member of the committee.

=== Senate ===
- Agriculture and Forestry (Chairman: Allen J. Ellender; Ranking Member: George D. Aiken)
- Appropriations (Chairman: Kenneth McKellar; Ranking Member: Styles Bridges)
- Armed Services (Chairman: Richard B. Russell; Ranking Member: Styles Bridges)
- Banking and Currency (Chairman: Burnet R. Maybank; Ranking Member: Homer Capehart)
- District of Columbia (Chairman: Matthew M. Neely; Ranking Member: Francis Case)
- Expenditures in Executive Departments (Chairman: John L. McClellan; Ranking Member: Joseph McCarthy)
- Finance (Chairman: Walter F. George; Ranking Member: Eugene D. Millikin)
- Foreign Relations (Chairman: Tom Connally; Ranking Member: Arthur H. Vandenberg)
- Interior and Insular Affairs (Chairman: Joseph C. O'Mahoney; Ranking Member: Hugh Butler)
- Interstate and Foreign Commerce (Chairman: Edwin C. Johnson; Ranking Member: Charles W. Tobey)
- Judiciary (Chairman: Pat McCarran; Ranking Member: Alexander Wiley)
- Labor and Public Welfare (Chairman: James E. Murray; Ranking Member: Robert A. Taft)
- Organized Crime in Interstate Commerce (Select) (Chairman: [data missing]; Ranking Member: [data missing])
- Post Office and Civil Service (Chairman: Olin D. Johnston; Ranking Member: William Langer)
- Public Works (Chairman: Dennis Chavez; Ranking Member: Harry P. Cain)
- Remodeling the Senate Chamber (Special) (Chairman: [data missing]; Ranking Member: [data missing])
- Rules and Administration (Chairman: Carl Hayden; Ranking Member: Kenneth S. Wherry)
- Small Business (Select) (Chairman: John Sparkman)
- Subcommittee on Internal Security
- Whole

=== House of Representatives ===
- Agriculture (Chairman: Harold D. Cooley; Ranking Member: Clifford R. Hope)
- Appropriations (Chairman: Clarence Cannon; Ranking Member: John Taber)
- Armed Services (Chairman: Carl Vinson; Ranking Member: Dewey J. Short)
- Banking and Currency (Chairman: Brent Spence; Ranking Member: Jesse P. Wolcott)
- District of Columbia (Chairman: John L. McMillan; Ranking Member: Sid Simpson)
- Education and Labor (Chairman: Graham A. Barden; Ranking Member: Samuel K. McConnell Jr.)
- Expenditures in the Executive Departments (Chairman: William L. Dawson; Ranking Member: Clare E. Hoffman)
- Foreign Affairs (Chairman: John Kee; Ranking Member: Charles Aubrey Eaton)
- House Administration (Chairman: Thomas B. Stanley; Ranking Member: Karl M. LeCompte)
- Interior and Insular Affairs (Chairman: John R. Murdock; Ranking Member: Fred L. Crawford)
- Interstate and Foreign Commerce (Chairman: Robert Crosser; Ranking Member: Charles A. Wolverton)
- Investigate Campaign Expenditures (Select) (Chairman: N/A; Ranking Member: N/A)
- Investigate Foundations and Other Organizations (Select) (Chairman: N/A; Ranking Member: N/A)
- Investigate Educational, Training, and Loan Guaranty Programs under the G.I. Bill (Select) (Chairman: Olin E. Teague)
- Investigate the Use of Chemicals in Food and Cosmetics (Select) (Chairman: N/A)
- Katyn Forest Massacre Investigation (Select) (Chairman: Ray J. Madden)
- Judiciary (Chairman: Emanuel Celler; Ranking Member: Chauncey W. Reed)
- Merchant Marine and Fisheries (Chairman: Edward J. Hart; Ranking Member: Alvin F. Weichel)
- Post Office and Civil Service (Chairman: Tom J. Murray; Ranking Member: Edward H. Rees)
- Public Works (Chairman: Charles A. Buckley; Ranking Member: George A. Dondero)
- Rules (Chairman: Adolph J. Sabath; Ranking Member: Leo E. Allen)
- Small Business (Select) (Chairman: Wright Patman)
- Standards of Official Conduct
- Un-American Activities (Chairman: John S. Wood; Ranking Member: Harold H. Velde)
- Veterans' Affairs (Chairman: John E. Rankin; Ranking Member: Edith Nourse Rogers)
- Ways and Means (Chairman: Robert L. Doughton; Ranking Member: Daniel A. Reed)
- Whole

=== Joint committees ===
- Atomic Energy (Chairman: Sen. Brien McMahon; Vice Chairman: Rep. Carl T. Durham)
- Conditions of Indian Tribes (Special)
- Defense Production (Chairman: Sen. Burnet R. Maybank; Vice Chairman: Rep. Paul Brown)
- Disposition of Executive Papers
- Economic (Chairman: Rep. Joseph C. O'Mahoney)
- Immigration and Nationality Policy
- Legislative Budget
- The Library (Chairman: Sen. Theodore F. Green)
- Navajo-Hopi Indian Administration
- Printing (Chairman: Sen. Carl Hayden; Vice Chairman: Rep. Thomas B. Stanley)
- Railroad Retirement Legislation
- Reduction of Nonessential Federal Expenditures (Chairman: Sen. Harry F. Byrd; Vice Chairman: Rep. Robert L. Doughton)
- Taxation (Chairman: Rep. Robert L. Doughton; Vice Chairman: Sen. Walter F. George)

== Employees ==
=== Legislative branch agency directors ===
- Architect of the Capitol: David Lynn
- Attending Physician of the United States Congress: George Calver
- Comptroller General of the United States: Lindsay C. Warren
- Librarian of Congress: Luther H. Evans
- Public Printer of the United States: John J. Deviny

=== Senate ===
- Chaplain: Frederick Brown Harris (Methodist)
- Parliamentarian: Charles Watkins
- Secretary: Leslie Biffle
- Librarian: Richard D. Hupman
- Secretary for the Majority: Felton McLellan Johnston
- Secretary for the Minority: J. Mark Trice
- Sergeant at Arms: Joseph C. Duke

=== House of Representatives ===
- Chaplain: Bernard Braskamp (Presbyterian)
- Clerk: Ralph R. Roberts
- Doorkeeper: William Mosley "Fishbait" Miller
- Parliamentarian: Lewis Deschler
- Postmaster: Finis E. Scott
- Reading Clerks: George J. Maurer (D) and Alney E. Chaffee (R)
- Sergeant at Arms: Joseph H. Callahan

== See also ==
- 1950 United States elections (elections leading to this Congress)
  - 1950 United States Senate elections
  - 1950 United States House of Representatives elections
- 1952 United States elections (elections during this Congress, leading to the next Congress)
  - 1952 United States presidential election
  - 1952 United States Senate elections
  - 1952 United States House of Representatives elections
