= List of United States senators from Michigan =

Current delegation

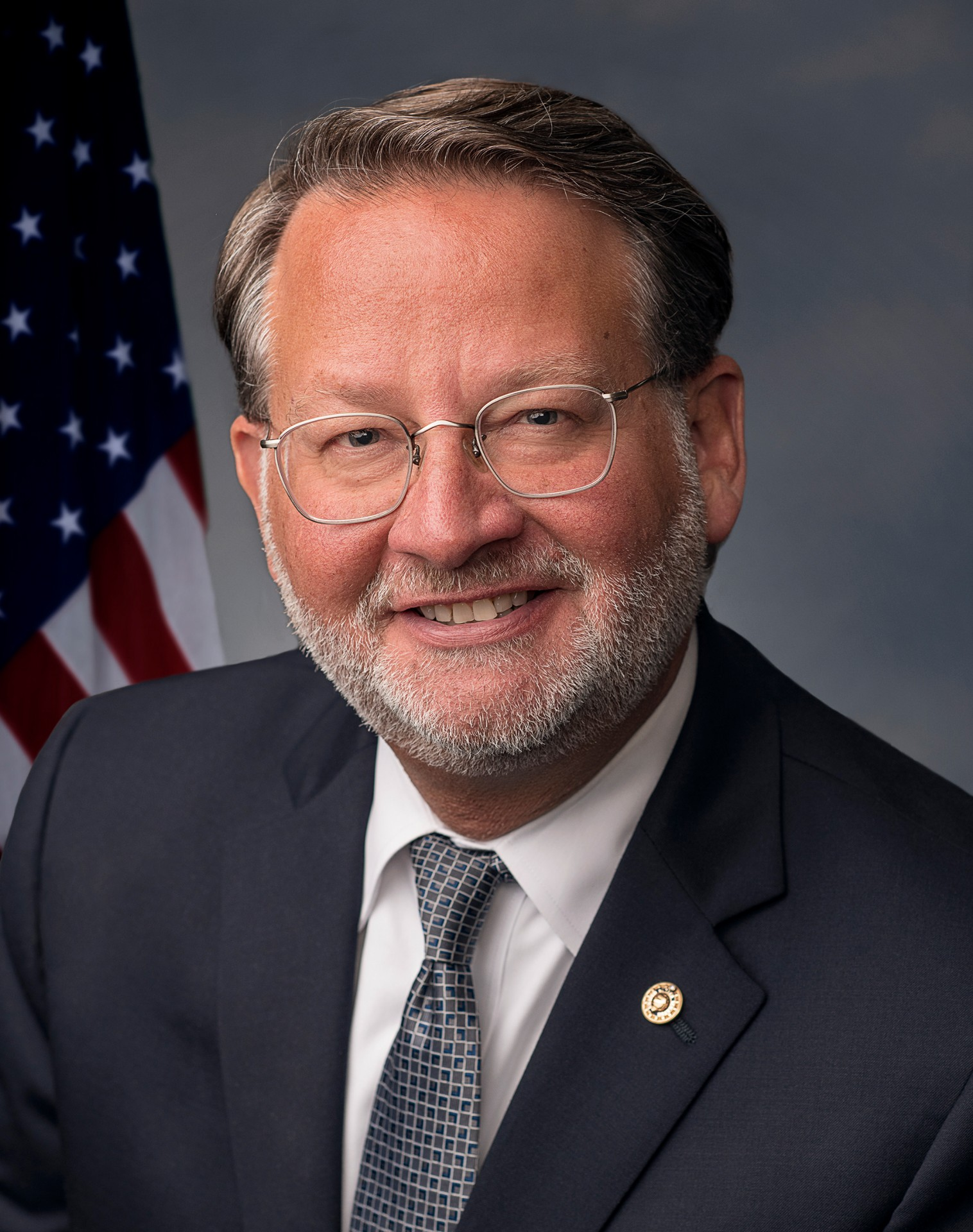
Gary Peters (D)

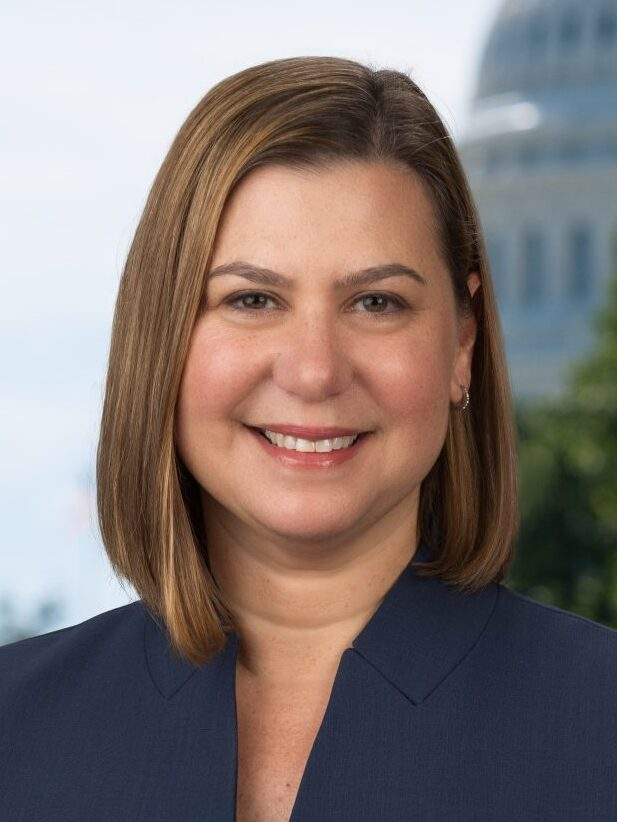
Elissa Slotkin (D)

(ordered by seniority)

Michigan was admitted to the Union on January 26, 1837. Its current U.S. senators are Democrats Gary Peters and Elissa Slotkin. Carl Levin was Michigan's longest-serving senator (1979–2015). Four Michigan senators have risen to the position of President pro tempore, and one (Thomas W. Ferry) served as President of the Senate from November 22, 1875, to March 3, 1877 (as acting Vice President of the United States).

== List of senators ==
Class 1 Class 1 senators belong to the electoral cycle that most recently had regular elections in 2006, 2012, 2018, and 2024. The next election will be in 2030.						C	Class 2 Class 2 senators belong to the electoral cycle that most recently had regular elections in 2008, 2014, 2020, and 2026. The next election will be in 2032.					
#	Senator	Party	Dates in office	Electoral history	T	C	T	Electoral history	Dates in office	Party	Senator	#
1	Lucius Lyon (Bronson)	Jacksonian	Jan 26, 1837 – Mar 3, 1839	Elected in 1835 but not seated until 1837 due to a territorial dispute with Ohio. Retired.	1	24th	1	Elected in 1835 but not seated until 1837 due to a territorial dispute with Ohio. Retired.	Jan 26, 1837 – Mar 3, 1841	Jacksonian	John Norvell (Detroit)	1
1	Lucius Lyon (Bronson)	Democratic	Jan 26, 1837 – Mar 3, 1839	Elected in 1835 but not seated until 1837 due to a territorial dispute with Ohio. Retired.	1	25th	1	Elected in 1835 but not seated until 1837 due to a territorial dispute with Ohio. Retired.	Jan 26, 1837 – Mar 3, 1841	Democratic	John Norvell (Detroit)	1
Vacant			Mar 4, 1839 – Jan 20, 1840		2	26th	1	Elected in 1835 but not seated until 1837 due to a territorial dispute with Ohio. Retired.	Jan 26, 1837 – Mar 3, 1841	Democratic	John Norvell (Detroit)	1
2	Augustus Porter (Detroit)	Whig	Jan 20, 1840 – Mar 3, 1845	Elected late in 1840. Retired.	2	26th	1	Elected in 1835 but not seated until 1837 due to a territorial dispute with Ohio. Retired.	Jan 26, 1837 – Mar 3, 1841	Democratic	John Norvell (Detroit)	1
2	Augustus Porter (Detroit)	Whig	Jan 20, 1840 – Mar 3, 1845	Elected late in 1840. Retired.	2	27th	2	Elected in 1841. Retired.	Mar 4, 1841 – Mar 3, 1847	Whig	William Woodbridge (Detroit)	2
2	Augustus Porter (Detroit)	Whig	Jan 20, 1840 – Mar 3, 1845	Elected late in 1840. Retired.	2	28th	2	Elected in 1841. Retired.	Mar 4, 1841 – Mar 3, 1847	Whig	William Woodbridge (Detroit)	2
3	Lewis Cass (Detroit)	Democratic	Mar 4, 1845 – May 29, 1848	Elected in 1844 or 1845. Resigned to run for president.	3	29th	2	Elected in 1841. Retired.	Mar 4, 1841 – Mar 3, 1847	Whig	William Woodbridge (Detroit)	2
3	Lewis Cass (Detroit)	Democratic	Mar 4, 1845 – May 29, 1848	Elected in 1844 or 1845. Resigned to run for president.	3	30th	3	Elected in 1847. Retired.	Mar 4, 1847 – Mar 3, 1853	Democratic	Alpheus Felch (Ann Arbor)	3
Vacant			May 29, 1848 – Jun 8, 1848		3	30th	3	Elected in 1847. Retired.	Mar 4, 1847 – Mar 3, 1853	Democratic	Alpheus Felch (Ann Arbor)	3
4	Thomas Fitzgerald (St. Joseph)	Democratic	Jun 8, 1848 – Mar 3, 1849	Appointed to continue Cass's term.	3	30th	3	Elected in 1847. Retired.	Mar 4, 1847 – Mar 3, 1853	Democratic	Alpheus Felch (Ann Arbor)	3
5	Lewis Cass (Detroit)	Democratic	Mar 4, 1849 – Mar 3, 1857	Elected in 1849 to finish his own term.	3	31st	3	Elected in 1847. Retired.	Mar 4, 1847 – Mar 3, 1853	Democratic	Alpheus Felch (Ann Arbor)	3
5	Lewis Cass (Detroit)	Democratic	Mar 4, 1849 – Mar 3, 1857	Re-elected in 1850 or 1851. Retired or lost re-election.	4	32nd	3	Elected in 1847. Retired.	Mar 4, 1847 – Mar 3, 1853	Democratic	Alpheus Felch (Ann Arbor)	3
5	Lewis Cass (Detroit)	Democratic	Mar 4, 1849 – Mar 3, 1857	Re-elected in 1850 or 1851. Retired or lost re-election.	4	33rd	4	Elected in 1853. Retired.	Mar 4, 1853 – Mar 3, 1859	Democratic	Charles E. Stuart (Kalamazoo)	4
5	Lewis Cass (Detroit)	Democratic	Mar 4, 1849 – Mar 3, 1857	Re-elected in 1850 or 1851. Retired or lost re-election.	4	34th	4	Elected in 1853. Retired.	Mar 4, 1853 – Mar 3, 1859	Democratic	Charles E. Stuart (Kalamazoo)	4
6	Zachariah Chandler (Detroit)	Republican	Mar 4, 1857 – Mar 3, 1875	Elected in 1857.	5	35th	4	Elected in 1853. Retired.	Mar 4, 1853 – Mar 3, 1859	Democratic	Charles E. Stuart (Kalamazoo)	4
6	Zachariah Chandler (Detroit)	Republican	Mar 4, 1857 – Mar 3, 1875	Elected in 1857.	5	36th	5	Elected in 1858. Died.	Mar 4, 1859 – Oct 5, 1861	Republican	Kinsley S. Bingham (Green Oak Township)	5
6	Zachariah Chandler (Detroit)	Republican	Mar 4, 1857 – Mar 3, 1875	Elected in 1857.	5	37th	5	Elected in 1858. Died.	Mar 4, 1859 – Oct 5, 1861	Republican	Kinsley S. Bingham (Green Oak Township)	5
6	Zachariah Chandler (Detroit)	Republican	Mar 4, 1857 – Mar 3, 1875	Elected in 1857.	5	37th	5		Oct 5, 1861 – Jan 17, 1862	Vacant		
6	Zachariah Chandler (Detroit)	Republican	Mar 4, 1857 – Mar 3, 1875	Elected in 1857.	5	37th	5	Elected in 1862 to finish Bingham's term.	Jan 17, 1862 – Mar 3, 1871	Republican	Jacob M. Howard (Detroit)	6
6	Zachariah Chandler (Detroit)	Republican	Mar 4, 1857 – Mar 3, 1875	Re-elected in 1863.	6	38th	5	Elected in 1862 to finish Bingham's term.	Jan 17, 1862 – Mar 3, 1871	Republican	Jacob M. Howard (Detroit)	6
6	Zachariah Chandler (Detroit)	Republican	Mar 4, 1857 – Mar 3, 1875	Re-elected in 1863.	6	39th	6	Re-elected in 1865. Retired or lost re-election.	Jan 17, 1862 – Mar 3, 1871	Republican	Jacob M. Howard (Detroit)	6
6	Zachariah Chandler (Detroit)	Republican	Mar 4, 1857 – Mar 3, 1875	Re-elected in 1863.	6	40th	6	Re-elected in 1865. Retired or lost re-election.	Jan 17, 1862 – Mar 3, 1871	Republican	Jacob M. Howard (Detroit)	6
6	Zachariah Chandler (Detroit)	Republican	Mar 4, 1857 – Mar 3, 1875	Re-elected in 1869. Lost re-election.	7	41st	6	Re-elected in 1865. Retired or lost re-election.	Jan 17, 1862 – Mar 3, 1871	Republican	Jacob M. Howard (Detroit)	6
6	Zachariah Chandler (Detroit)	Republican	Mar 4, 1857 – Mar 3, 1875	Re-elected in 1869. Lost re-election.	7	42nd	7	Elected in 1871.	Mar 4, 1871 – Mar 3, 1883	Republican	Thomas W. Ferry (Grand Haven)	7
6	Zachariah Chandler (Detroit)	Republican	Mar 4, 1857 – Mar 3, 1875	Re-elected in 1869. Lost re-election.	7	43rd	7	Elected in 1871.	Mar 4, 1871 – Mar 3, 1883	Republican	Thomas W. Ferry (Grand Haven)	7
7	Isaac P. Christiancy (Lansing)	Republican	Mar 4, 1875 – Feb 10, 1879	Elected in 1874. Resigned due to ill health.	8	44th	7	Elected in 1871.	Mar 4, 1871 – Mar 3, 1883	Republican	Thomas W. Ferry (Grand Haven)	7
7	Isaac P. Christiancy (Lansing)	Republican	Mar 4, 1875 – Feb 10, 1879	Elected in 1874. Resigned due to ill health.	8	45th	8	Re-elected in 1877. Lost re-election.	Mar 4, 1871 – Mar 3, 1883	Republican	Thomas W. Ferry (Grand Haven)	7
Vacant			Feb 10, 1879 – Feb 22, 1879		8	45th	8	Re-elected in 1877. Lost re-election.	Mar 4, 1871 – Mar 3, 1883	Republican	Thomas W. Ferry (Grand Haven)	7
8	Zachariah Chandler (Detroit)	Republican	Feb 22, 1879 – Nov 1, 1879	Elected in 1879 to finish Christiancy's term. Died.	8	45th	8	Re-elected in 1877. Lost re-election.	Mar 4, 1871 – Mar 3, 1883	Republican	Thomas W. Ferry (Grand Haven)	7
8	Zachariah Chandler (Detroit)	Republican	Feb 22, 1879 – Nov 1, 1879	Elected in 1879 to finish Christiancy's term. Died.	8	46th	8	Re-elected in 1877. Lost re-election.	Mar 4, 1871 – Mar 3, 1883	Republican	Thomas W. Ferry (Grand Haven)	7
Vacant			Nov 1, 1879 – Nov 17, 1879		8	46th	8	Re-elected in 1877. Lost re-election.	Mar 4, 1871 – Mar 3, 1883	Republican	Thomas W. Ferry (Grand Haven)	7
9	Henry P. Baldwin (Detroit)	Republican	Nov 17, 1879 – Mar 3, 1881	Appointed to continue Christiancy's term. Elected in 1881 to finish Christiancy's term. Retired.	8	46th	8	Re-elected in 1877. Lost re-election.	Mar 4, 1871 – Mar 3, 1883	Republican	Thomas W. Ferry (Grand Haven)	7
10	Omar D. Conger (Port Huron)	Republican	Mar 4, 1881 – Mar 3, 1887	Elected in 1881. Lost renomination.	9	47th	8	Re-elected in 1877. Lost re-election.	Mar 4, 1871 – Mar 3, 1883	Republican	Thomas W. Ferry (Grand Haven)	7
10	Omar D. Conger (Port Huron)	Republican	Mar 4, 1881 – Mar 3, 1887	Elected in 1881. Lost renomination.	9	48th	9	Election year unknown. Retired.	Mar 4, 1883 – Mar 3, 1889	Republican	Thomas W. Palmer (Detroit)	8
10	Omar D. Conger (Port Huron)	Republican	Mar 4, 1881 – Mar 3, 1887	Elected in 1881. Lost renomination.	9	49th	9	Election year unknown. Retired.	Mar 4, 1883 – Mar 3, 1889	Republican	Thomas W. Palmer (Detroit)	8
11	Francis B. Stockbridge (Kalamazoo)	Republican	Mar 4, 1887 – Apr 30, 1894	Elected in 1887.	10	50th	9	Election year unknown. Retired.	Mar 4, 1883 – Mar 3, 1889	Republican	Thomas W. Palmer (Detroit)	8
11	Francis B. Stockbridge (Kalamazoo)	Republican	Mar 4, 1887 – Apr 30, 1894	Elected in 1887.	10	51st	10	Elected in 1889.	Mar 4, 1889 – Aug 10, 1902	Republican	James McMillan (Detroit)	9
11	Francis B. Stockbridge (Kalamazoo)	Republican	Mar 4, 1887 – Apr 30, 1894	Elected in 1887.	10	52nd	10	Elected in 1889.	Mar 4, 1889 – Aug 10, 1902	Republican	James McMillan (Detroit)	9
11	Francis B. Stockbridge (Kalamazoo)	Republican	Mar 4, 1887 – Apr 30, 1894	Re-elected in 1893. Died.	11	53rd	10	Elected in 1889.	Mar 4, 1889 – Aug 10, 1902	Republican	James McMillan (Detroit)	9
Vacant			Apr 30, 1894 – May 5, 1894		11	53rd	10	Elected in 1889.	Mar 4, 1889 – Aug 10, 1902	Republican	James McMillan (Detroit)	9
12	John Patton Jr. (Grand Rapids)	Republican	May 5, 1894 – Jan 24, 1895	Appointed to continue Stockbridge's term. Lost election to finish the term.	11	53rd	10	Elected in 1889.	Mar 4, 1889 – Aug 10, 1902	Republican	James McMillan (Detroit)	9
13	Julius C. Burrows (Kalamazoo)	Republican	Jan 24, 1895 – Mar 3, 1911	Elected in 1895 to finish Stockbridge's term.	11	53rd	10	Elected in 1889.	Mar 4, 1889 – Aug 10, 1902	Republican	James McMillan (Detroit)	9
13	Julius C. Burrows (Kalamazoo)	Republican	Jan 24, 1895 – Mar 3, 1911	Elected in 1895 to finish Stockbridge's term.	11	54th	11	Re-elected in 1895.	Mar 4, 1889 – Aug 10, 1902	Republican	James McMillan (Detroit)	9
13	Julius C. Burrows (Kalamazoo)	Republican	Jan 24, 1895 – Mar 3, 1911	Elected in 1895 to finish Stockbridge's term.	11	55th	11	Re-elected in 1895.	Mar 4, 1889 – Aug 10, 1902	Republican	James McMillan (Detroit)	9
13	Julius C. Burrows (Kalamazoo)	Republican	Jan 24, 1895 – Mar 3, 1911	Re-elected in 1899.	12	56th	11	Re-elected in 1895.	Mar 4, 1889 – Aug 10, 1902	Republican	James McMillan (Detroit)	9
13	Julius C. Burrows (Kalamazoo)	Republican	Jan 24, 1895 – Mar 3, 1911	Re-elected in 1899.	12	57th	12	Re-elected in 1901. Died.	Mar 4, 1889 – Aug 10, 1902	Republican	James McMillan (Detroit)	9
13	Julius C. Burrows (Kalamazoo)	Republican	Jan 24, 1895 – Mar 3, 1911	Re-elected in 1899.	12	57th	12		Aug 10, 1902 – Sep 27, 1902	Vacant		
13	Julius C. Burrows (Kalamazoo)	Republican	Jan 24, 1895 – Mar 3, 1911	Re-elected in 1899.	12	57th	12	Appointed to continue McMillan's term. Elected in 1903 to finish McMillan's term. Died.	Sep 27, 1902 – Jan 24, 1907	Republican	Russell A. Alger (Detroit)	10
13	Julius C. Burrows (Kalamazoo)	Republican	Jan 24, 1895 – Mar 3, 1911	Re-elected in 1899.	12	58th	12	Appointed to continue McMillan's term. Elected in 1903 to finish McMillan's term. Died.	Sep 27, 1902 – Jan 24, 1907	Republican	Russell A. Alger (Detroit)	10
13	Julius C. Burrows (Kalamazoo)	Republican	Jan 24, 1895 – Mar 3, 1911	Re-elected in 1905. Lost renomination.	13	59th	12	Appointed to continue McMillan's term. Elected in 1903 to finish McMillan's term. Died.	Sep 27, 1902 – Jan 24, 1907	Republican	Russell A. Alger (Detroit)	10
13	Julius C. Burrows (Kalamazoo)	Republican	Jan 24, 1895 – Mar 3, 1911	Re-elected in 1905. Lost renomination.	13	59th	12		Jan 24, 1907 – Feb 9, 1907	Vacant		
13	Julius C. Burrows (Kalamazoo)	Republican	Jan 24, 1895 – Mar 3, 1911	Re-elected in 1905. Lost renomination.	13	59th	12	Elected in 1907 to finish McMillan's term, having already been elected to the next term.	Feb 9, 1907 – Mar 3, 1919	Republican	William A. Smith (Grand Rapids)	11
13	Julius C. Burrows (Kalamazoo)	Republican	Jan 24, 1895 – Mar 3, 1911	Re-elected in 1905. Lost renomination.	13	60th	13	Elected in 1907.	Feb 9, 1907 – Mar 3, 1919	Republican	William A. Smith (Grand Rapids)	11
13	Julius C. Burrows (Kalamazoo)	Republican	Jan 24, 1895 – Mar 3, 1911	Re-elected in 1905. Lost renomination.	13	61st	13	Elected in 1907.	Feb 9, 1907 – Mar 3, 1919	Republican	William A. Smith (Grand Rapids)	11
14	Charles E. Townsend (Jackson)	Republican	Mar 4, 1911 – Mar 3, 1923	Elected in 1911.	14	62nd	13	Elected in 1907.	Feb 9, 1907 – Mar 3, 1919	Republican	William A. Smith (Grand Rapids)	11
14	Charles E. Townsend (Jackson)	Republican	Mar 4, 1911 – Mar 3, 1923	Elected in 1911.	14	63rd	14	Re-elected in 1913. Retired.	Feb 9, 1907 – Mar 3, 1919	Republican	William A. Smith (Grand Rapids)	11
14	Charles E. Townsend (Jackson)	Republican	Mar 4, 1911 – Mar 3, 1923	Elected in 1911.	14	64th	14	Re-elected in 1913. Retired.	Feb 9, 1907 – Mar 3, 1919	Republican	William A. Smith (Grand Rapids)	11
14	Charles E. Townsend (Jackson)	Republican	Mar 4, 1911 – Mar 3, 1923	Re-elected in 1916. Lost re-election.	15	65th	14	Re-elected in 1913. Retired.	Feb 9, 1907 – Mar 3, 1919	Republican	William A. Smith (Grand Rapids)	11
14	Charles E. Townsend (Jackson)	Republican	Mar 4, 1911 – Mar 3, 1923	Re-elected in 1916. Lost re-election.	15	66th	15	Elected in 1918. Resigned.	Mar 4, 1919 – Nov 18, 1922	Republican	Truman H. Newberry (Grosse Pointe Farms)	12
14	Charles E. Townsend (Jackson)	Republican	Mar 4, 1911 – Mar 3, 1923	Re-elected in 1916. Lost re-election.	15	67th	15	Elected in 1918. Resigned.	Mar 4, 1919 – Nov 18, 1922	Republican	Truman H. Newberry (Grosse Pointe Farms)	12
14	Charles E. Townsend (Jackson)	Republican	Mar 4, 1911 – Mar 3, 1923	Re-elected in 1916. Lost re-election.	15	67th	15		Nov 18, 1922 – Nov 29, 1922	Vacant		
14	Charles E. Townsend (Jackson)	Republican	Mar 4, 1911 – Mar 3, 1923	Re-elected in 1916. Lost re-election.	15	67th	15	Appointed to continue Newberry's term. Elected in 1924 to finish Newberry's term.	Nov 29, 1922 – Oct 22, 1936	Republican	James Couzens (Detroit)	13
15	Woodbridge N. Ferris (Big Rapids)	Democratic	Mar 4, 1923 – Mar 23, 1928	Elected in 1922. Died.	16	68th	15	Appointed to continue Newberry's term. Elected in 1924 to finish Newberry's term.	Nov 29, 1922 – Oct 22, 1936	Republican	James Couzens (Detroit)	13
15	Woodbridge N. Ferris (Big Rapids)	Democratic	Mar 4, 1923 – Mar 23, 1928	Elected in 1922. Died.	16	69th	16	Re-elected in 1924.	Nov 29, 1922 – Oct 22, 1936	Republican	James Couzens (Detroit)	13
15	Woodbridge N. Ferris (Big Rapids)	Democratic	Mar 4, 1923 – Mar 23, 1928	Elected in 1922. Died.	16	70th	16	Re-elected in 1924.	Nov 29, 1922 – Oct 22, 1936	Republican	James Couzens (Detroit)	13
Vacant			Mar 23, 1928 – Mar 31, 1928		16	70th	16	Re-elected in 1924.	Nov 29, 1922 – Oct 22, 1936	Republican	James Couzens (Detroit)	13
16	Arthur Vandenberg (Grand Rapids)	Republican	Mar 31, 1928 – Apr 18, 1951	Appointed to continue Ferris's term. Elected in 1928 to finish Ferris's term.	16	70th	16	Re-elected in 1924.	Nov 29, 1922 – Oct 22, 1936	Republican	James Couzens (Detroit)	13
16	Arthur Vandenberg (Grand Rapids)	Republican	Mar 31, 1928 – Apr 18, 1951	Elected in 1928.	17	71st	16	Re-elected in 1924.	Nov 29, 1922 – Oct 22, 1936	Republican	James Couzens (Detroit)	13
16	Arthur Vandenberg (Grand Rapids)	Republican	Mar 31, 1928 – Apr 18, 1951	Elected in 1928.	17	72nd	17	Re-elected in 1930. Died. (Note: Couzens died after having already lost renomination.)	Nov 29, 1922 – Oct 22, 1936	Republican	James Couzens (Detroit)	13
16	Arthur Vandenberg (Grand Rapids)	Republican	Mar 31, 1928 – Apr 18, 1951	Elected in 1928.	17	73rd	17	Re-elected in 1930. Died.	Nov 29, 1922 – Oct 22, 1936	Republican	James Couzens (Detroit)	13
16	Arthur Vandenberg (Grand Rapids)	Republican	Mar 31, 1928 – Apr 18, 1951	Re-elected in 1934.	18	74th	17	Re-elected in 1930. Died.	Nov 29, 1922 – Oct 22, 1936	Republican	James Couzens (Detroit)	13
16	Arthur Vandenberg (Grand Rapids)	Republican	Mar 31, 1928 – Apr 18, 1951	Re-elected in 1934.	18	74th	17		Oct 22, 1936 – Nov 19, 1936	Vacant		
16	Arthur Vandenberg (Grand Rapids)	Republican	Mar 31, 1928 – Apr 18, 1951	Re-elected in 1934.	18	74th	17	Appointed to finish Couzens's term, having already been elected to the next term.	Nov 19, 1936 – Jan 3, 1943	Democratic	Prentiss M. Brown (St. Ignace)	14
16	Arthur Vandenberg (Grand Rapids)	Republican	Mar 31, 1928 – Apr 18, 1951	Re-elected in 1934.	18	75th	18	Elected in 1936. Lost re-election.	Nov 19, 1936 – Jan 3, 1943	Democratic	Prentiss M. Brown (St. Ignace)	14
16	Arthur Vandenberg (Grand Rapids)	Republican	Mar 31, 1928 – Apr 18, 1951	Re-elected in 1934.	18	76th	18	Elected in 1936. Lost re-election.	Nov 19, 1936 – Jan 3, 1943	Democratic	Prentiss M. Brown (St. Ignace)	14
16	Arthur Vandenberg (Grand Rapids)	Republican	Mar 31, 1928 – Apr 18, 1951	Re-elected in 1940.	19	77th	18	Elected in 1936. Lost re-election.	Nov 19, 1936 – Jan 3, 1943	Democratic	Prentiss M. Brown (St. Ignace)	14
16	Arthur Vandenberg (Grand Rapids)	Republican	Mar 31, 1928 – Apr 18, 1951	Re-elected in 1940.	19	78th	19	Elected in 1942.	Jan 3, 1943 – Jan 3, 1955	Republican	Homer Ferguson (Detroit)	15
16	Arthur Vandenberg (Grand Rapids)	Republican	Mar 31, 1928 – Apr 18, 1951	Re-elected in 1940.	19	79th	19	Elected in 1942.	Jan 3, 1943 – Jan 3, 1955	Republican	Homer Ferguson (Detroit)	15
16	Arthur Vandenberg (Grand Rapids)	Republican	Mar 31, 1928 – Apr 18, 1951	Re-elected in 1946. Died.	20	80th	19	Elected in 1942.	Jan 3, 1943 – Jan 3, 1955	Republican	Homer Ferguson (Detroit)	15
16	Arthur Vandenberg (Grand Rapids)	Republican	Mar 31, 1928 – Apr 18, 1951	Re-elected in 1946. Died.	20	81st	20	Re-elected in 1948. Lost re-election.	Jan 3, 1943 – Jan 3, 1955	Republican	Homer Ferguson (Detroit)	15
16	Arthur Vandenberg (Grand Rapids)	Republican	Mar 31, 1928 – Apr 18, 1951	Re-elected in 1946. Died.	20	82nd	20	Re-elected in 1948. Lost re-election.	Jan 3, 1943 – Jan 3, 1955	Republican	Homer Ferguson (Detroit)	15
Vacant			Apr 18, 1951 – Apr 23, 1951		20	82nd	20	Re-elected in 1948. Lost re-election.	Jan 3, 1943 – Jan 3, 1955	Republican	Homer Ferguson (Detroit)	15
17	Blair Moody (Detroit)	Democratic	Apr 23, 1951 – Nov 4, 1952	Appointed to continue Vandenberg's term. Lost election to finish the term.	20	82nd	20	Re-elected in 1948. Lost re-election.	Jan 3, 1943 – Jan 3, 1955	Republican	Homer Ferguson (Detroit)	15
18	Charles E. Potter (Cheboygan)	Republican	Nov 5, 1952 – Jan 3, 1959	Elected in 1952 to finish Vandenberg's term.	20	82nd	20	Re-elected in 1948. Lost re-election.	Jan 3, 1943 – Jan 3, 1955	Republican	Homer Ferguson (Detroit)	15
18	Charles E. Potter (Cheboygan)	Republican	Nov 5, 1952 – Jan 3, 1959	Elected to full term in 1952. Lost re-election.	21	83rd	20	Re-elected in 1948. Lost re-election.	Jan 3, 1943 – Jan 3, 1955	Republican	Homer Ferguson (Detroit)	15
18	Charles E. Potter (Cheboygan)	Republican	Nov 5, 1952 – Jan 3, 1959	Elected to full term in 1952. Lost re-election.	21	84th	21	Elected in 1954.	Jan 3, 1955 – Apr 30, 1966	Democratic	Patrick V. McNamara (Detroit)	16
18	Charles E. Potter (Cheboygan)	Republican	Nov 5, 1952 – Jan 3, 1959	Elected to full term in 1952. Lost re-election.	21	85th	21	Elected in 1954.	Jan 3, 1955 – Apr 30, 1966	Democratic	Patrick V. McNamara (Detroit)	16
19	Philip Hart (Mackinac Island)	Democratic	Jan 3, 1959 – Dec 26, 1976	Elected in 1958.	22	86th	21	Elected in 1954.	Jan 3, 1955 – Apr 30, 1966	Democratic	Patrick V. McNamara (Detroit)	16
19	Philip Hart (Mackinac Island)	Democratic	Jan 3, 1959 – Dec 26, 1976	Elected in 1958.	22	87th	22	Re-elected in 1960. Died.	Jan 3, 1955 – Apr 30, 1966	Democratic	Patrick V. McNamara (Detroit)	16
19	Philip Hart (Mackinac Island)	Democratic	Jan 3, 1959 – Dec 26, 1976	Elected in 1958.	22	88th	22	Re-elected in 1960. Died.	Jan 3, 1955 – Apr 30, 1966	Democratic	Patrick V. McNamara (Detroit)	16
19	Philip Hart (Mackinac Island)	Democratic	Jan 3, 1959 – Dec 26, 1976	Re-elected in 1964.	23	89th	22	Re-elected in 1960. Died.	Jan 3, 1955 – Apr 30, 1966	Democratic	Patrick V. McNamara (Detroit)	16
19	Philip Hart (Mackinac Island)	Democratic	Jan 3, 1959 – Dec 26, 1976	Re-elected in 1964.	23	89th	22		Apr 30, 1966 – May 11, 1966	Vacant		
19	Philip Hart (Mackinac Island)	Democratic	Jan 3, 1959 – Dec 26, 1976	Re-elected in 1964.	23	89th	22	Appointed to continue McNamara's term. Elected in 1966 to finish McNamara's term.	May 11, 1966 – Jan 3, 1979	Republican	Robert P. Griffin (Traverse City)	17
19	Philip Hart (Mackinac Island)	Democratic	Jan 3, 1959 – Dec 26, 1976	Re-elected in 1964.	23	90th	23	Elected to full term in 1966.	May 11, 1966 – Jan 3, 1979	Republican	Robert P. Griffin (Traverse City)	17
19	Philip Hart (Mackinac Island)	Democratic	Jan 3, 1959 – Dec 26, 1976	Re-elected in 1964.	23	91st	23	Elected to full term in 1966.	May 11, 1966 – Jan 3, 1979	Republican	Robert P. Griffin (Traverse City)	17
19	Philip Hart (Mackinac Island)	Democratic	Jan 3, 1959 – Dec 26, 1976	Re-elected in 1970. Died. (Note: Hart died when he was already going to retire at the end of the term.)	24	92nd	23	Elected to full term in 1966.	May 11, 1966 – Jan 3, 1979	Republican	Robert P. Griffin (Traverse City)	17
19	Philip Hart (Mackinac Island)	Democratic	Jan 3, 1959 – Dec 26, 1976	Re-elected in 1970. Died.	24	93rd	24	Re-elected in 1972. Lost re-election.	May 11, 1966 – Jan 3, 1979	Republican	Robert P. Griffin (Traverse City)	17
19	Philip Hart (Mackinac Island)	Democratic	Jan 3, 1959 – Dec 26, 1976	Re-elected in 1970. Died.	24	94th	24	Re-elected in 1972. Lost re-election.	May 11, 1966 – Jan 3, 1979	Republican	Robert P. Griffin (Traverse City)	17
Vacant			Dec 26, 1976 – Dec 30, 1976		24	94th	24	Re-elected in 1972. Lost re-election.	May 11, 1966 – Jan 3, 1979	Republican	Robert P. Griffin (Traverse City)	17
20	Donald Riegle (Flint)	Democratic	Dec 30, 1976 – Jan 3, 1995	Appointed early to finish Hart's term, having already been elected to the next term.	24	94th	24	Re-elected in 1972. Lost re-election.	May 11, 1966 – Jan 3, 1979	Republican	Robert P. Griffin (Traverse City)	17
20	Donald Riegle (Flint)	Democratic	Dec 30, 1976 – Jan 3, 1995	Elected in 1976.	25	95th	24	Re-elected in 1972. Lost re-election.	May 11, 1966 – Jan 3, 1979	Republican	Robert P. Griffin (Traverse City)	17
20	Donald Riegle (Flint)	Democratic	Dec 30, 1976 – Jan 3, 1995	Elected in 1976.	25	96th	25	Elected in 1978.	Jan 3, 1979 – Jan 3, 2015	Democratic	Carl Levin (Detroit)	18
20	Donald Riegle (Flint)	Democratic	Dec 30, 1976 – Jan 3, 1995	Elected in 1976.	25	97th	25	Elected in 1978.	Jan 3, 1979 – Jan 3, 2015	Democratic	Carl Levin (Detroit)	18
20	Donald Riegle (Flint)	Democratic	Dec 30, 1976 – Jan 3, 1995	Re-elected in 1982.	26	98th	25	Elected in 1978.	Jan 3, 1979 – Jan 3, 2015	Democratic	Carl Levin (Detroit)	18
20	Donald Riegle (Flint)	Democratic	Dec 30, 1976 – Jan 3, 1995	Re-elected in 1982.	26	99th	26	Re-elected in 1984.	Jan 3, 1979 – Jan 3, 2015	Democratic	Carl Levin (Detroit)	18
20	Donald Riegle (Flint)	Democratic	Dec 30, 1976 – Jan 3, 1995	Re-elected in 1982.	26	100th	26	Re-elected in 1984.	Jan 3, 1979 – Jan 3, 2015	Democratic	Carl Levin (Detroit)	18
20	Donald Riegle (Flint)	Democratic	Dec 30, 1976 – Jan 3, 1995	Re-elected in 1988. Retired.	27	101st	26	Re-elected in 1984.	Jan 3, 1979 – Jan 3, 2015	Democratic	Carl Levin (Detroit)	18
20	Donald Riegle (Flint)	Democratic	Dec 30, 1976 – Jan 3, 1995	Re-elected in 1988. Retired.	27	102nd	27	Re-elected in 1990.	Jan 3, 1979 – Jan 3, 2015	Democratic	Carl Levin (Detroit)	18
20	Donald Riegle (Flint)	Democratic	Dec 30, 1976 – Jan 3, 1995	Re-elected in 1988. Retired.	27	103rd	27	Re-elected in 1990.	Jan 3, 1979 – Jan 3, 2015	Democratic	Carl Levin (Detroit)	18
21	Spencer Abraham (Auburn Hills)	Republican	Jan 3, 1995 – Jan 3, 2001	Elected in 1994. Lost re-election.	28	104th	27	Re-elected in 1990.	Jan 3, 1979 – Jan 3, 2015	Democratic	Carl Levin (Detroit)	18
21	Spencer Abraham (Auburn Hills)	Republican	Jan 3, 1995 – Jan 3, 2001	Elected in 1994. Lost re-election.	28	105th	28	Re-elected in 1996.	Jan 3, 1979 – Jan 3, 2015	Democratic	Carl Levin (Detroit)	18
21	Spencer Abraham (Auburn Hills)	Republican	Jan 3, 1995 – Jan 3, 2001	Elected in 1994. Lost re-election.	28	106th	28	Re-elected in 1996.	Jan 3, 1979 – Jan 3, 2015	Democratic	Carl Levin (Detroit)	18
22	Debbie Stabenow (Lansing)	Democratic	Jan 3, 2001 – Jan 3, 2025	Elected in 2000.	29	107th	28	Re-elected in 1996.	Jan 3, 1979 – Jan 3, 2015	Democratic	Carl Levin (Detroit)	18
22	Debbie Stabenow (Lansing)	Democratic	Jan 3, 2001 – Jan 3, 2025	Elected in 2000.	29	108th	29	Re-elected in 2002.	Jan 3, 1979 – Jan 3, 2015	Democratic	Carl Levin (Detroit)	18
22	Debbie Stabenow (Lansing)	Democratic	Jan 3, 2001 – Jan 3, 2025	Elected in 2000.	29	109th	29	Re-elected in 2002.	Jan 3, 1979 – Jan 3, 2015	Democratic	Carl Levin (Detroit)	18
22	Debbie Stabenow (Lansing)	Democratic	Jan 3, 2001 – Jan 3, 2025	Re-elected in 2006.	30	110th	29	Re-elected in 2002.	Jan 3, 1979 – Jan 3, 2015	Democratic	Carl Levin (Detroit)	18
22	Debbie Stabenow (Lansing)	Democratic	Jan 3, 2001 – Jan 3, 2025	Re-elected in 2006.	30	111th	30	Re-elected in 2008. Retired.	Jan 3, 1979 – Jan 3, 2015	Democratic	Carl Levin (Detroit)	18
22	Debbie Stabenow (Lansing)	Democratic	Jan 3, 2001 – Jan 3, 2025	Re-elected in 2006.	30	112th	30	Re-elected in 2008. Retired.	Jan 3, 1979 – Jan 3, 2015	Democratic	Carl Levin (Detroit)	18
22	Debbie Stabenow (Lansing)	Democratic	Jan 3, 2001 – Jan 3, 2025	Re-elected in 2012.	31	113th	30	Re-elected in 2008. Retired.	Jan 3, 1979 – Jan 3, 2015	Democratic	Carl Levin (Detroit)	18
22	Debbie Stabenow (Lansing)	Democratic	Jan 3, 2001 – Jan 3, 2025	Re-elected in 2012.	31	114th	31	Elected in 2014.	Jan 3, 2015 – present	Democratic	Gary Peters (Bloomfield Hills)	19
22	Debbie Stabenow (Lansing)	Democratic	Jan 3, 2001 – Jan 3, 2025	Re-elected in 2012.	31	115th	31	Elected in 2014.	Jan 3, 2015 – present	Democratic	Gary Peters (Bloomfield Hills)	19
22	Debbie Stabenow (Lansing)	Democratic	Jan 3, 2001 – Jan 3, 2025	Re-elected in 2018. Retired.	32	116th	31	Elected in 2014.	Jan 3, 2015 – present	Democratic	Gary Peters (Bloomfield Hills)	19
22	Debbie Stabenow (Lansing)	Democratic	Jan 3, 2001 – Jan 3, 2025	Re-elected in 2018. Retired.	32	117th	32	Re-elected in 2020. Retiring at the end of term.	Jan 3, 2015 – present	Democratic	Gary Peters (Bloomfield Hills)	19
22	Debbie Stabenow (Lansing)	Democratic	Jan 3, 2001 – Jan 3, 2025	Re-elected in 2018. Retired.	32	118th	32	Re-elected in 2020. Retiring at the end of term.	Jan 3, 2015 – present	Democratic	Gary Peters (Bloomfield Hills)	19
23	Elissa Slotkin (Holly)	Democratic	Jan 3, 2025 – present	Elected in 2024.	33	119th	32	Re-elected in 2020. Retiring at the end of term.	Jan 3, 2015 – present	Democratic	Gary Peters (Bloomfield Hills)	19
23	Elissa Slotkin (Holly)	Democratic	Jan 3, 2025 – present	Elected in 2024.	33	120th	33	Elected in 2026.	Taking office Jan 3, 2027	Democratic	Abdul El-Sayed (elect) (Ann Arbor)	20
23	Elissa Slotkin (Holly)	Democratic	Jan 3, 2025 – present	Elected in 2024.	33	121st	33	Elected in 2026.	Taking office Jan 3, 2027	Democratic	Abdul El-Sayed (elect) (Ann Arbor)	20
To be determined in the 2030 election.					34	122nd	33	Elected in 2026.	Taking office Jan 3, 2027	Democratic	Abdul El-Sayed (elect) (Ann Arbor)	20
To be determined in the 2030 election.					34	123rd	34	To be determined in the 2032 election.				

== See also ==
- Elections in Michigan
- List of United States representatives from Michigan
- Michigan's congressional delegations
