= Elly M. Peterson =

American politician from Michigan (1914–2008)

Elly Peterson
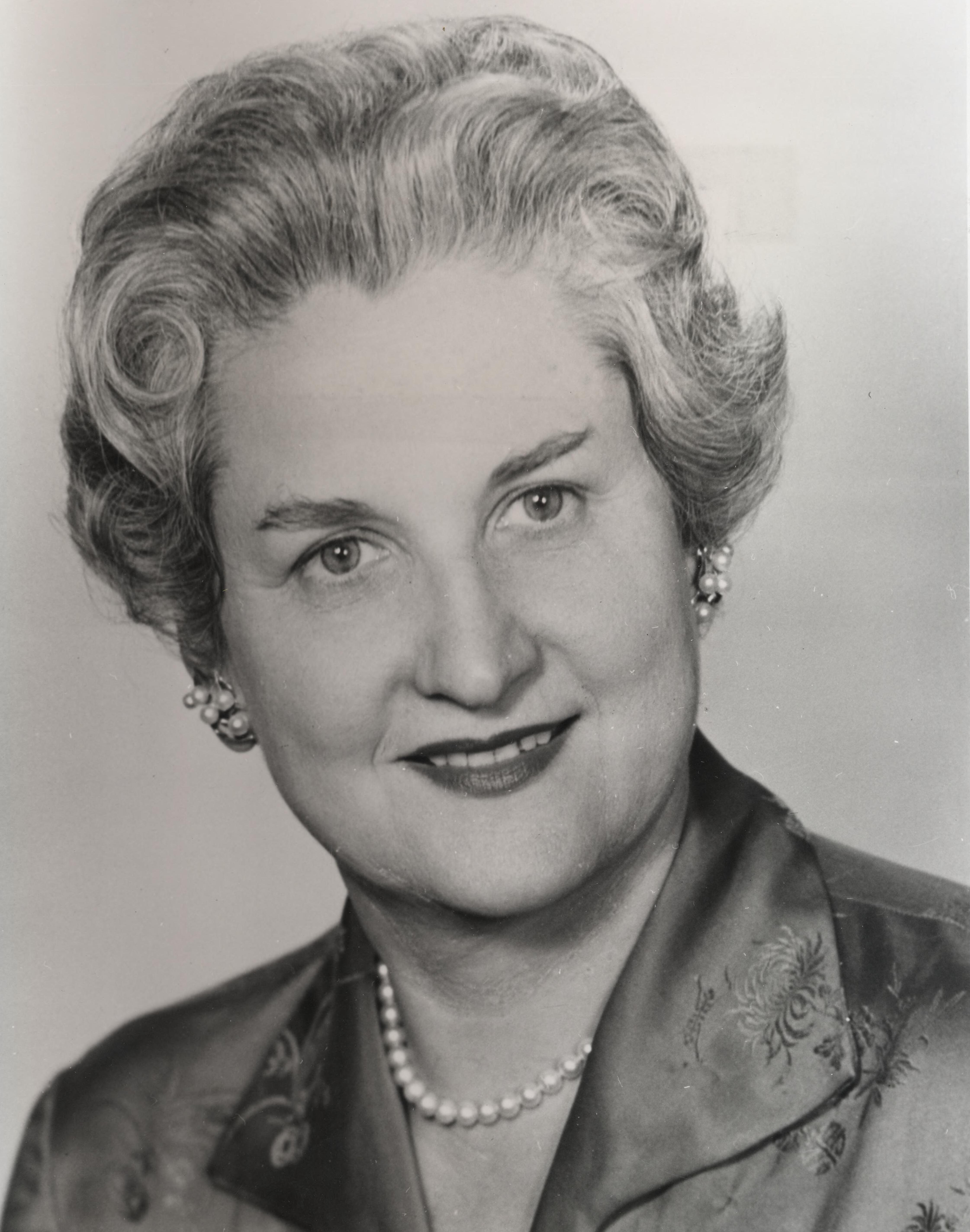
- Peterson in 1963

Chair of the Michigan Republican Party
- In office 1965–1969
- Preceded by: Arthur Elliott
- Succeeded by: William McLaughlin

Personal details
- Born: Ella Maude McMillan; June 5, 1914 New Berlin, Illinois, U.S.
- Died: June 9, 2008 (aged 94) Grand Junction, Colorado, U.S.
- Party: Republican (Before 1980); Independent (1980–2008)
- Education: William Woods University (attended)

Elly M. Peterson (June 5, 1914 – June 9, 2008), was an American politician and women's rights advocate. Peterson held leadership positions in the Michigan Republican Party and the Republican National Committee, and ran for U.S. Senate in Michigan in 1964. Peterson was a co-founder of bipartisan Equal Rights Amendment advocacy group ERAmerica in the 1970s, working closely with Democratic women's rights activist Liz Carpenter.

Peterson left the Republican Party after objecting to the party's 1980 national platform, and was an independent for the rest of her life. Peterson was an overseas Red Cross volunteer in World War II. She was an officer in the American Cancer Society, an active member of the Congregational Church, American Legion Auxiliary, and a lifetime member of the NAACP. Peterson was featured in the Supersisters trading card set of notable American women in 1979, and was inducted into the Michigan Women's Hall of Fame in 1984.

== Early life and education ==
On June 5, 1914, Peterson was born as Ella Maude McMillan in New Berlin, Illinois. McMillan was the youngest of four children of teacher Maude Ella Carpenter and physician John Charles McMillan, and grew up in a politically divided family.

McMillan attended William Woods College in Fulton, Missouri. She found that she "had no real desire to go to college," and was expelled in early 1933 after attending a New Year's Eve party that served alcohol in violation of Prohibition, which had yet to be repealed. At the suggestion of her older sister Mary, McMillan moved to Chicago and enrolled in a business school in Oak Park. In 1934, she met W. Merritt Peterson at a University of Illinois football game, and they were married in 1935.

== Career ==
Peterson was vice chairwoman of the Michigan Republican Party from 1961 to 1963 and a candidate for U.S. Senator from Michigan in 1964. Asked to run by Governor George W. Romney, Peterson would later comment that she picked up the gauntlet and ran for the Senate because no one else would run against the popular incumbent, Philip Hart, particularly in a year with her party divided over its presidential candidate, Barry Goldwater. Winning just 35.3 percent of the vote, she nevertheless bettered Goldwater's tally in Michigan—33.1 percent—and did so with little funds; to accomplish that much was a tribute to her energy, organization and down-to-earth appeal.

In 1965, Peterson became the first woman to serve as chair of the Michigan Republican Party. In 1965, Peterson was also the first woman in U.S. history to chair a Republican state central committee, until 1969. The Michigan Political History Society eventually selected Elly Peterson as the best Republican state chairwoman in the last fifty years. She was assistant to the chair of the Republican National Committee from 1969 to 1971.

In 1979, the Supersisters trading card set was produced and distributed; one of the cards featured Peterson's name and picture.

Eventually, Peterson became an independent.

== Political positions ==
She worked to elect Romney as governor and his lieutenant governor, William Milliken, who succeeded him when Romney became joined the cabinet of President Richard Nixon as the secretary of Housing and Urban Development in 1969.

At the Republican National Committee, Peterson was a strong advocate for outreach, empowerment, fence-mending and organization. She continued the practices that had made her effective as chairwoman of the Michigan Republican Party. Inquisitive and probing, she was also quick to laugh and often referred to as "mother" by her interns, such as Christine Todd Whitman. Friendly and un-dogmatic, while in Washington she shared a house with the prominent Democrat Liz Carpenter, who'd been press secretary for Lady Bird Johnson and a speech-writer for Vice President Lyndon Johnson.

An egalitarian by philosophy and example, Peterson was a national co-chairwoman of ERAmerica, a private national campaign organization, during the fight to get the Equal Rights Amendment ratified. Peterson also strongly supported abortion rights and was a charter member in the National Women's Political Caucus. At this time, in the early 1970s, the conservative wing of the Republican Party was beginning to create friction with the liberal members, Peterson amongst them. She successfully battled to keep Phyllis Schlafly from seizing control of the National Federation of Republican Women, but she was experiencing reduced affinity with the Republican National Convention platform and by 1983 endorsed James Blanchard, the Democrat running for governor of Michigan, rather than the conservative Republican.

== Awards ==
- 1984 Michigan Women's Hall of Fame

== Personal life ==
In 1935, Peterson married William M. Peterson. Peterson joined the American Red Cross and spent 22 months in England, France and Germany. After World War II, Peterson and her family moved to Charlotte, Michigan. They have no children.

In 1994, Peterson's husband died.

On June 9, 2008, Peterson died in Grand Junction, Colorado.

Party political offices
Preceded by Charles Potter	Republican nominee for U.S. Senator from Michigan (Class 1); 1964	Succeeded by Lenore Romney
Preceded by Arthur Elliott	Chair of the Michigan Republican Party; 1965–1969	Succeeded by William McLaughlin
