= Blair Moody Jr. =

American judge (1928–1982)

Blair Moody Jr. (February 27, 1928 – November 26, 1982) was an American jurist.

Born in Detroit, Michigan, Moody's father Blair Moody was a journalist who also served as United States Senator from Michigan. Moody worked as a journalist while in college for The Washington Post and The Detroit News. Moody attended the University of Michigan; he received his A.B. degree in 1949, and his LL.B. degree in 1952. During the Korean War, Moody served in the United States Air Force. He then practiced law in Detroit, Michigan and was involved with the Democratic Party. Moody was elected as a Michigan Circuit Court judge in 1965 and then served on the Michigan Supreme Court from 1976 until his death in 1982. Moody died in a hospital in Detroit, Michigan, following a Thanksgiving Day heart attack at his home.

== See also ==
- Blair Moody
