= 1958 United States Senate election in Michigan =

- November 4, 1958
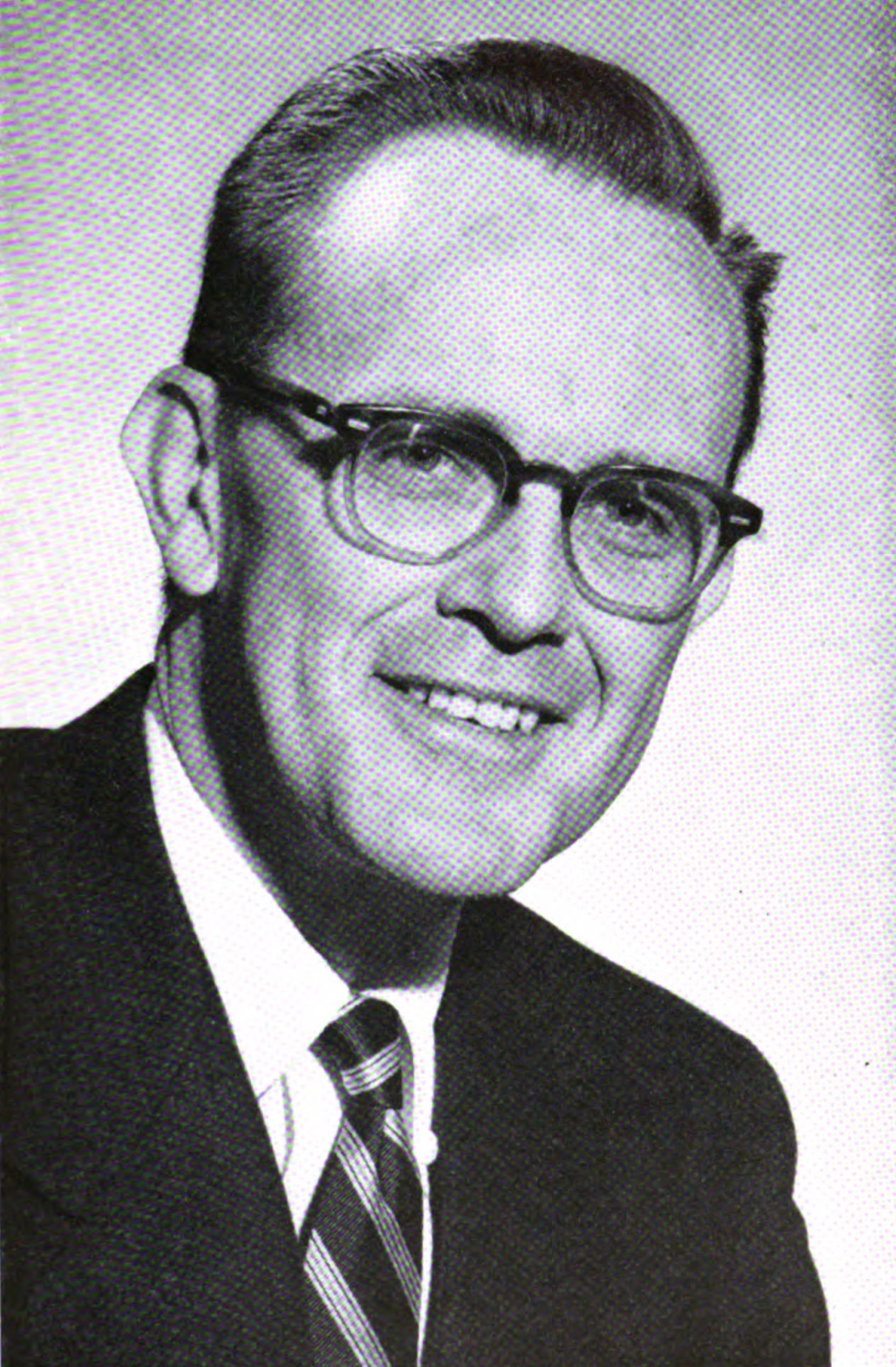

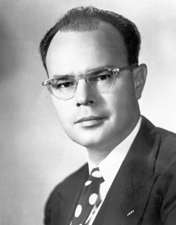
Nominee	Philip Hart	Charles E. Potter
Party	Democratic	Republican
Popular vote	1,216,966	1,046,963
Percentage	53.57%	46.09%
- County results Hart: 50–60% 60–70% Potter: 50–60% 60–70% 70–80%
U.S. senator before election
Charles E. Potter
Republican
Elected U.S. Senator
Philip Hart
Democratic

The 1958 United States Senate election in Michigan was held on November 4, 1958.

Incumbent Senator Charles E. Potter was defeated in his bid for re-election to a second term by Lieutenant Governor Philip A. Hart. This was one of a record 15 seats Democrats gained from the Republican Party. This was the first time since 1857 that Democrats held both Senate seats in the state simultaneously.

== Republican primary ==
=== Candidates ===
- Charles E. Potter, incumbent Senator

=== Results ===
Senator Potter was unopposed for re-nomination by the Republican Party.

== Democratic primary ==
=== Candidates ===
- Philip Hart, Lieutenant Governor of Michigan
- Homer Martin, former UAW President

=== Results ===
1958 Democratic U.S. Senate primary
Party	Candidate	Votes	%
Democratic	Philip Hart	297,767	80.24%
Democratic	Homer Martin	73,334	19.76%
Write-in	All others	18	0.00%
Total votes		371,114	100.00%

== General election ==
=== Candidates ===
- Philip Hart, Lieutenant Governor of Michigan (Democratic)
- Elmer H. Ormiston (Prohibition)
- Charles E. Potter, incumbent Senator since 1953 (Republican)
- Evelyn Sell (Socialist Workers)
- James Sim, perennial candidate (Socialist Labor)

=== Results ===
General election results
Party	Candidate	Votes	%	±%
Democratic	Philip Hart	1,216,966	53.57%	▲4.53
Republican	Charles E. Potter (incumbent)	1,046,963	46.09%	▼4.54
Prohibition	Elmert H. Ormiston	3,518	0.16%	▼0.10
Socialist Labor	James Sim	3,128	0.14%	▲0.10
Socialist Workers	Evelyn Sell	1,068	0.05%	▲0.02
Total votes		2,271,643	100.00%	N/A
Democratic gain from Republican				

== See also ==
- 1958 United States Senate elections
