= 1964 United States Senate election in Michigan =

- November 3, 1964
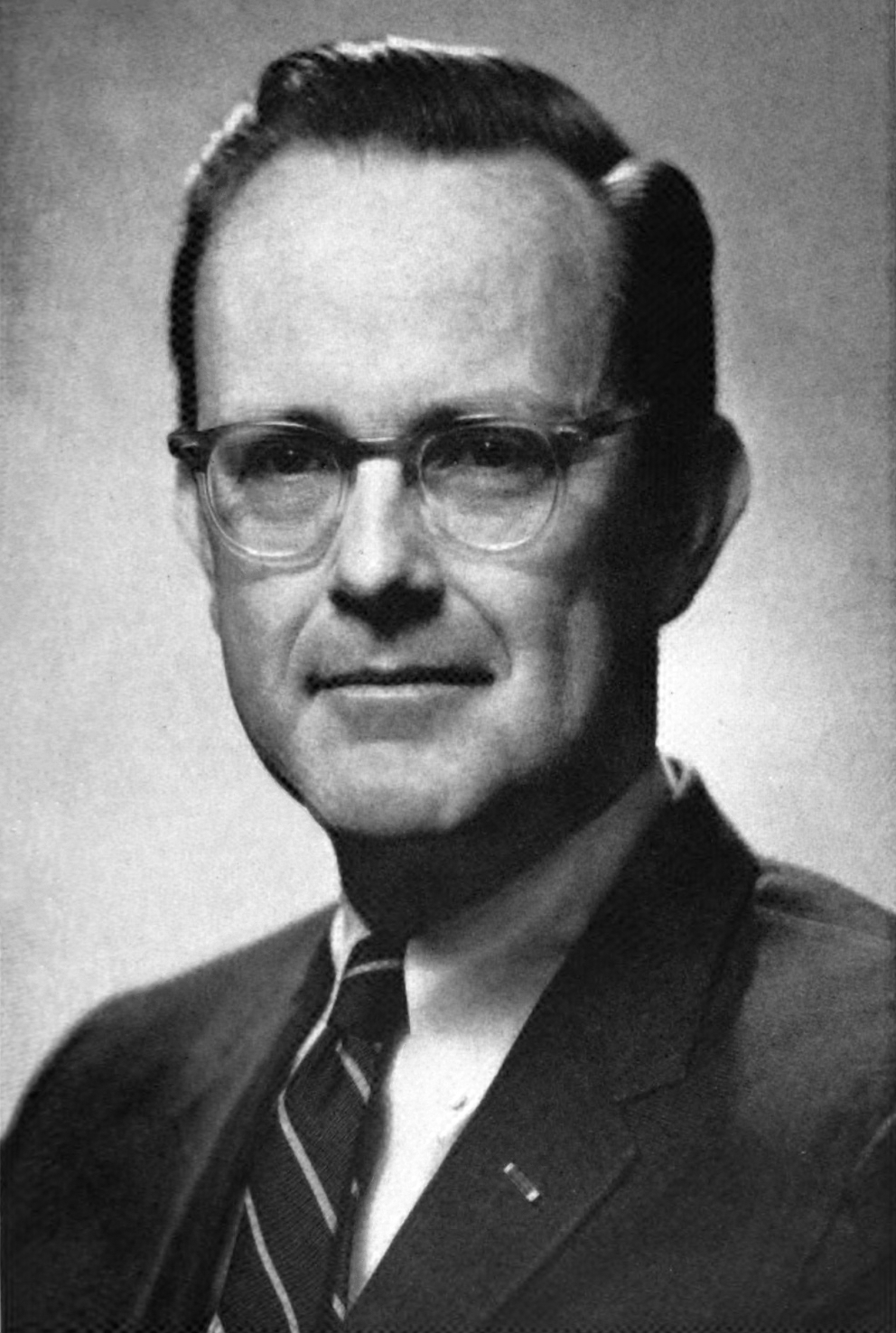

Nominee	Philip Hart	Elly Peterson
Party	Democratic	Republican
Popular vote	1,996,912	1,096,272
Percentage	64.38%	35.35%
- County results Hart: 50–60% 60–70% 70–80% Peterson: 50–60% 60–70%
U.S. senator before election
Philip Hart
Democratic
Elected U.S. Senator
Philip Hart
Democratic

The 1964 United States Senate election in Michigan took place on November 3, 1964. Incumbent Democratic U.S. Senator Philip Hart was re-elected to a second term in office over Republican Elly Peterson.

== Republican primary ==
=== Candidates ===
- Edward A. Meany
- James F. O'Neill, candidate for U.S. Representative in 1962
- Elly Peterson, former vice chairwoman of the Michigan Republican Party

=== Results ===
1964 Republican U.S. Senate primary
Party	Candidate	Votes	%
Republican	Elly Peterson	219,883	38.97%
Republican	James F. O'Neill	192,825	34.18%
Republican	Edward A. Meany	151,498	26.85%
Write-in		19	0.00%
Total votes		564,225	100.00%

== General election ==
=== Results ===
1964 U.S. Senate election in Michigan
Party	Candidate	Votes	%	±%
Democratic	Philip Hart (incumbent)	1,996,912	64.38%	▲10.81
Republican	Elly Peterson	1,096,272	35.35%	▼10.74
Freedom Now	Ernest C. Smith	4,125	0.13%	N/A
Socialist Workers	Evelyn Sell	2,754	0.09%	▲0.04
Socialist Labor	James Sim	1,598	0.05%	▼0.09
Total votes		3,101,667	100.00%	
Democratic hold		Swing		

== See also ==
- 1964 United States Senate elections
