= 1952 United States Senate elections in Michigan =

1952 United States Senate election in Michigan
- November 4, 1952
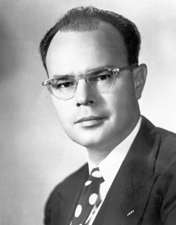

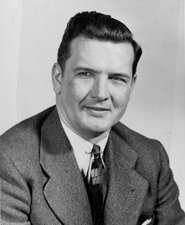
Nominee	Charles E. Potter	Blair Moody
Party	Republican	Democratic
Popular vote	1,428,352	1,383,416
Percentage	50.63%	49.04%
- County results Potter: 50–60% 60–70% 70–80% 80–90% Moody: 50–60% 60–70%
U.S. senator before election
Blair Moody
Democratic
Elected U.S. Senator
Charles E. Potter
Republican

The 1952 United States Senate election in Michigan was held on November 4, 1952, alongside a special election to the same seat.

Republican Senator Arthur Vandenberg died in office in April 1951. Governor G. Mennen Williams appointed journalist Blair Moody to fill Vandenberg's seat until a successor could be duly elected. Moody then lost the special election to complete Vandenberg's term and the regularly scheduled 1952 election to U.S. Representative Charles E. Potter, both held on November 4.

== Democratic primary ==
=== Candidates ===
- Blair Moody, interim appointee Senator
- Louis C. Schwinger

Schwinger did not run in the special election.

=== Results ===
==== Regular ====
1952 Democratic U.S. Senate primary
Party	Candidate	Votes	%
Democratic	Blair Moody (incumbent)	465,379	88.36%
Democratic	Louis C. Schwinger	61,309	11.64%
Write-in		13	0.00%
Total votes		526,701	100.00%

==== Special ====
1952 Democratic special U.S. Senate primary
Party	Candidate	Votes	%
Democratic	Blair Moody (incumbent)	431,994	99.98%
Write-in		95	0.02%
Total votes		432,089	100.00%

== Republican primary ==
=== Candidates ===
- Eugene C. Keyes, Lieutenant Governor of Michigan
- John B. Martin Jr., Michigan Auditor General
- Charles E. Potter, U.S. Representative from Cheboygan
- Clifford Prevost

Keyes and Prevost were not candidates for the special election to finish Vandenberg's term.

=== Results ===
==== Regular ====
1952 Republican U.S. Senate primary
Party	Candidate	Votes	%
Republican	Charles E. Potter	413,244	48.95%
Republican	John B. Martin Jr.	219,765	26.03%
Republican	Eugene C. Keyes	187,619	22.23%
Republican	Clifford Provost	23,542	2.79%
Write-in		6	0.00%
Total votes		844,176	100.00%

==== Special ====
1952 Republican special U.S. Senate primary
Party	Candidate	Votes	%
Republican	Charles E. Potter	468,214	59.83%
Republican	John B. Martin Jr.	314,128	40.14%
Write-in		246	0.03%
Total votes		782,588	100.00%

== General election ==
=== Results ===
==== Regular ====
1952 U.S. Senate election in Michigan
Party	Candidate	Votes	%
Republican	Charles E. Potter	1,428,352	50.63%
Democratic	Blair Moody (incumbent)	1,383,416	49.04%
Prohibition	LeRoy M. Lowell	7,435	0.26%
Socialist Labor	James Sim	1,202	0.04%
Socialist Workers	Genora Dollinger	726	0.03%
Total votes		2,821,131	100.00%
Republican gain from Democratic			

==== Special ====
Special election results by county Potter: 50–60%; 60–70%; 70–80%; 80–90%; Moody: 50–60%; 60–70%

1952 U.S. Senate special election in Michigan
Party	Candidate	Votes	%
Republican	Charles E. Potter	1,417,032	51.24%
Democratic	Blair Moody (incumbent)	1,347,705	48.73%
Socialist Workers	Genora Dollinger	819	0.03%
Total votes		2,765,556	100.00%
Republican gain from Democratic			

== See also ==
- 1952 United States Senate elections
