= Philip Hart =

American lawyer and politician (1912–1976)

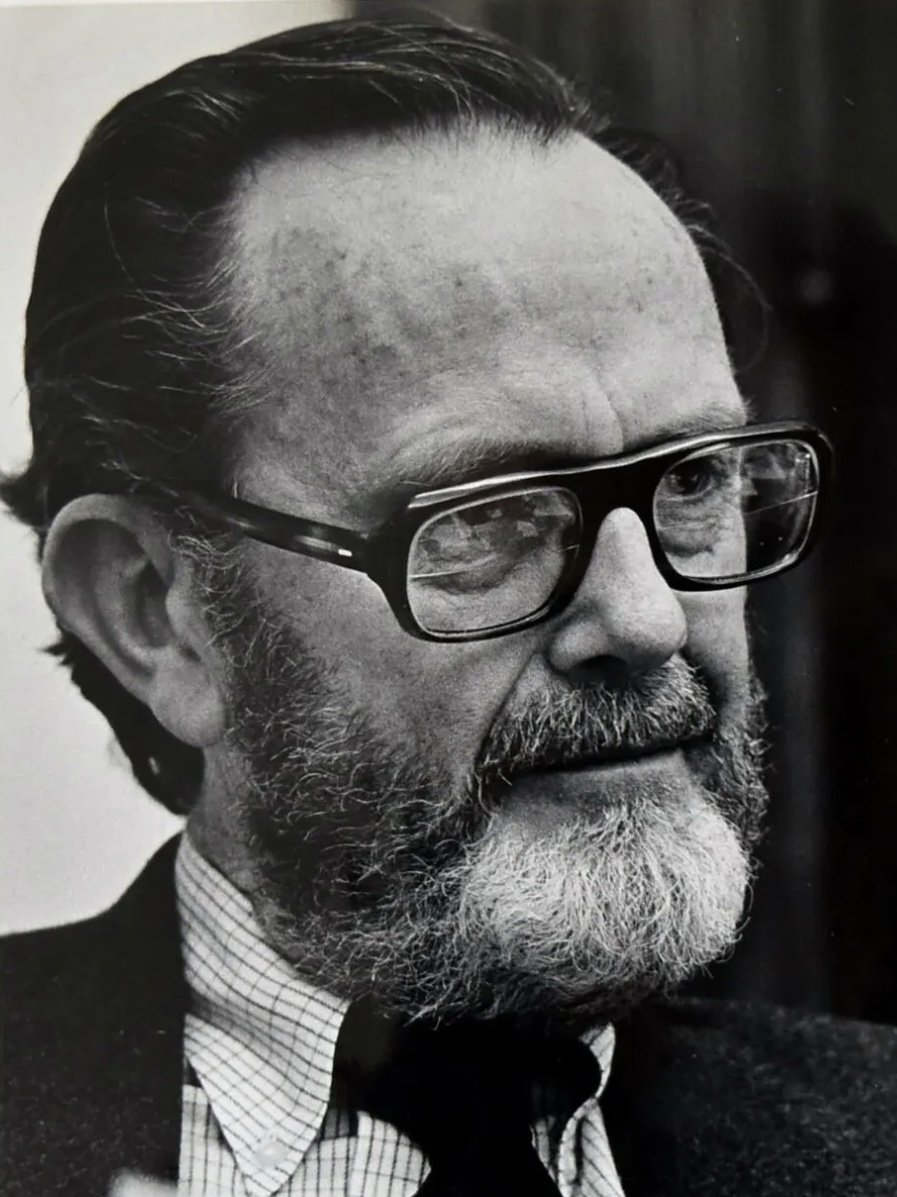

United States Senator from Michigan
- In office January 3, 1959 – December 26, 1976
- Preceded by: Charles E. Potter
- Succeeded by: Donald Riegle

51st Lieutenant Governor of Michigan
- In office January 1, 1955 – January 1, 1959
- Governor: G. Mennen Williams
- Preceded by: Clarence A. Reid
- Succeeded by: John Swainson

Personal details
- Born: Philip Aloysius Hart; December 10, 1912 Bryn Mawr, Pennsylvania, U.S.
- Died: December 26, 1976 (aged 64) Washington D.C., U.S.
- Party: Democratic
- Spouse: Jane Briggs (m. 1943)
- Children: 9
- Education: Georgetown University; University of Michigan Law School
- Profession: Attorney

Military service
- Allegiance: United States
- Branch/service: United States Army
- Years of service: 1941–1946
- Rank: Lieutenant colonel
- Unit: 4th Infantry Division
- Battles/wars: World War II: Invasion of Normandy
- Awards: Purple Heart

Philip Aloysius Hart (December 10, 1912 – December 26, 1976) was an American lawyer and politician. A Democrat, he served as a United States senator from Michigan from 1959 until his death from cancer in 1976. He was known as the "Conscience of the Senate". The Hart Senate Office Building is named in his honor.

== Early life and family ==
The grandson of Irish immigrants, Philip Hart was born in Bryn Mawr, Pennsylvania, to Philip Aloysius and Ann (née Clyde) Hart. His father was a banker who served as president of the Bryn Mawr Trust Company. He received his early education at Waldron Academy, and then attended West Philadelphia Catholic High School.

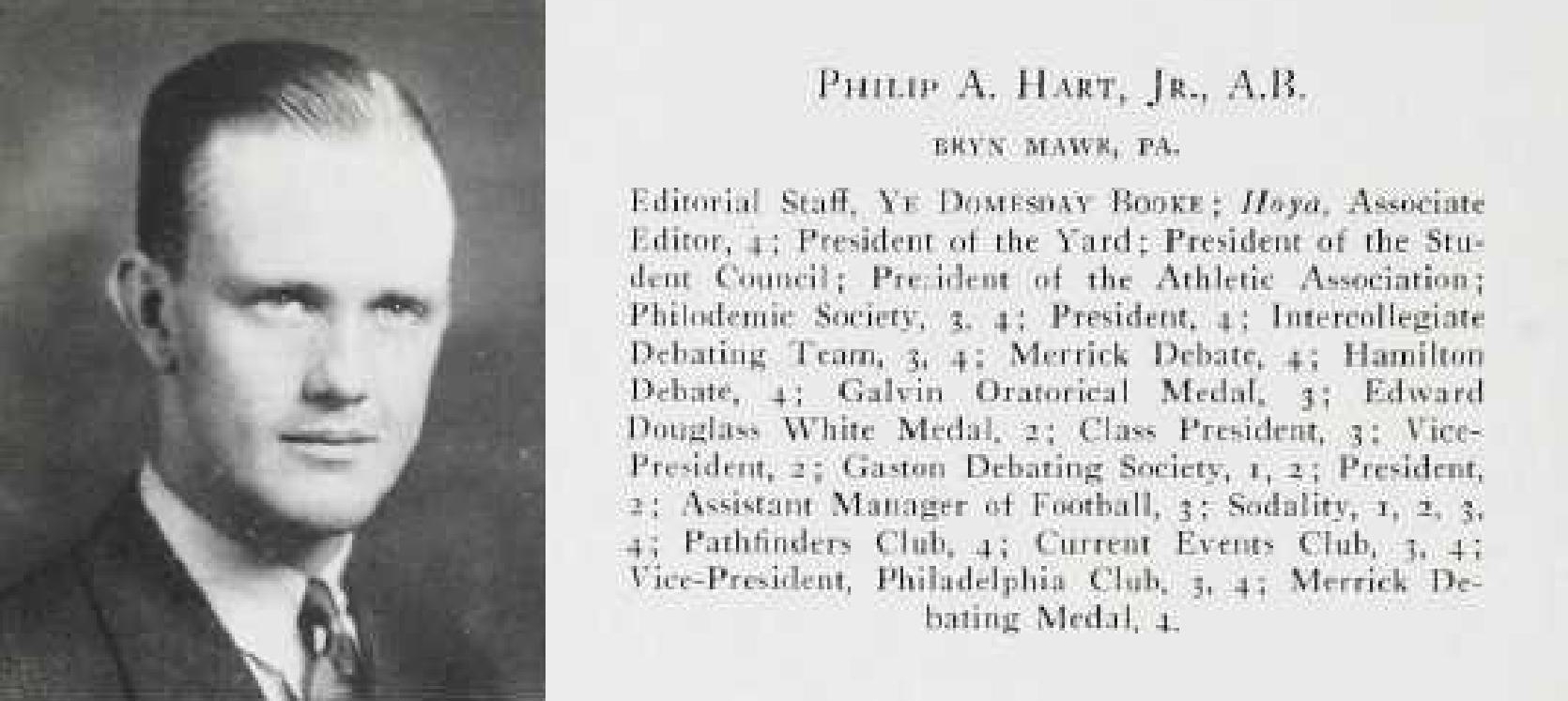
Hart in the Georgetown University yearbook, 1934

Hart studied at Georgetown University in Washington, D.C., where he was the student body president and an award-winning debater. He received a Bachelor of Arts degree cum laude from Georgetown in 1934. In 1937, he received a Juris Doctor degree from the University of Michigan Law School at Ann Arbor.

In June 1943, Hart married Jane "Janey" Briggs, the daughter of Walter and Jane Cameron Briggs. Her father was by then a philanthropist and had owned the Detroit Tigers. Jane was an aviator who was the first female helicopter pilot in Michigan. She later qualified in the 1960s as one of the Mercury 13 group. The couple met through her brother, who was Hart's roommate at Georgetown. They have four surviving sons and four daughters. Hart's namesake, Philip Jr., died as a toddler. He was buried in a family plot, followed decades later by his father nearby.

== Early career ==
Hart was admitted to the State Bar of Michigan in 1938 and became an associate in the Detroit firm of Beaumont, Smith & Harris. During World War II, he served in the U.S. Army as a lieutenant colonel with the 4th Infantry Division (1941–1946). He was wounded during the D-Day invasion of Normandy on Utah Beach when shrapnel from an exploding artillery shell damaged the inside of his right arm. Following the war, he returned to Michigan and recovered at the Percy Jones Army Hospital in Battle Creek, Michigan. There he became acquainted with fellow veterans Bob Dole and Daniel Inouye, both also future U.S. senators. He was decorated with the Bronze Star Medal with clusters, Arrowhead device, Purple Heart, and Croix de guerre.

In 1946, Hart returned to Detroit and entered the general law practice of Monaghan, Hart & Crawmer. He became politically active in the Democratic Party and, from 1949 to 1951, he served as Michigan's Corporation Securities Commissioner, a political appointee position. His duties included the approving of stock issues of corporations in the state, licensing real estate brokers and builders, and collecting real estate taxes. In 1951 Hart was appointed as state director of the Office of Price Stabilization, serving for a year. For his work in that office, he was named Outstanding Federal Administrator of the Year in 1952 by the Federal Business Association.

In 1952, he was appointed as U.S. Attorney for the Eastern District of Michigan, serving for one year. He next served from 1953 to 1954 as legal adviser to Governor G. Mennen Williams, a former law school classmate.

In 1954, Hart ran for electoral office, elected as the 51st lieutenant governor of Michigan, on a ticket with Governor Williams. He served two terms, until 1959. His re-election in 1956 made him the first Democrat in Michigan to serve two terms as lieutenant governor.

== U.S. Senate ==
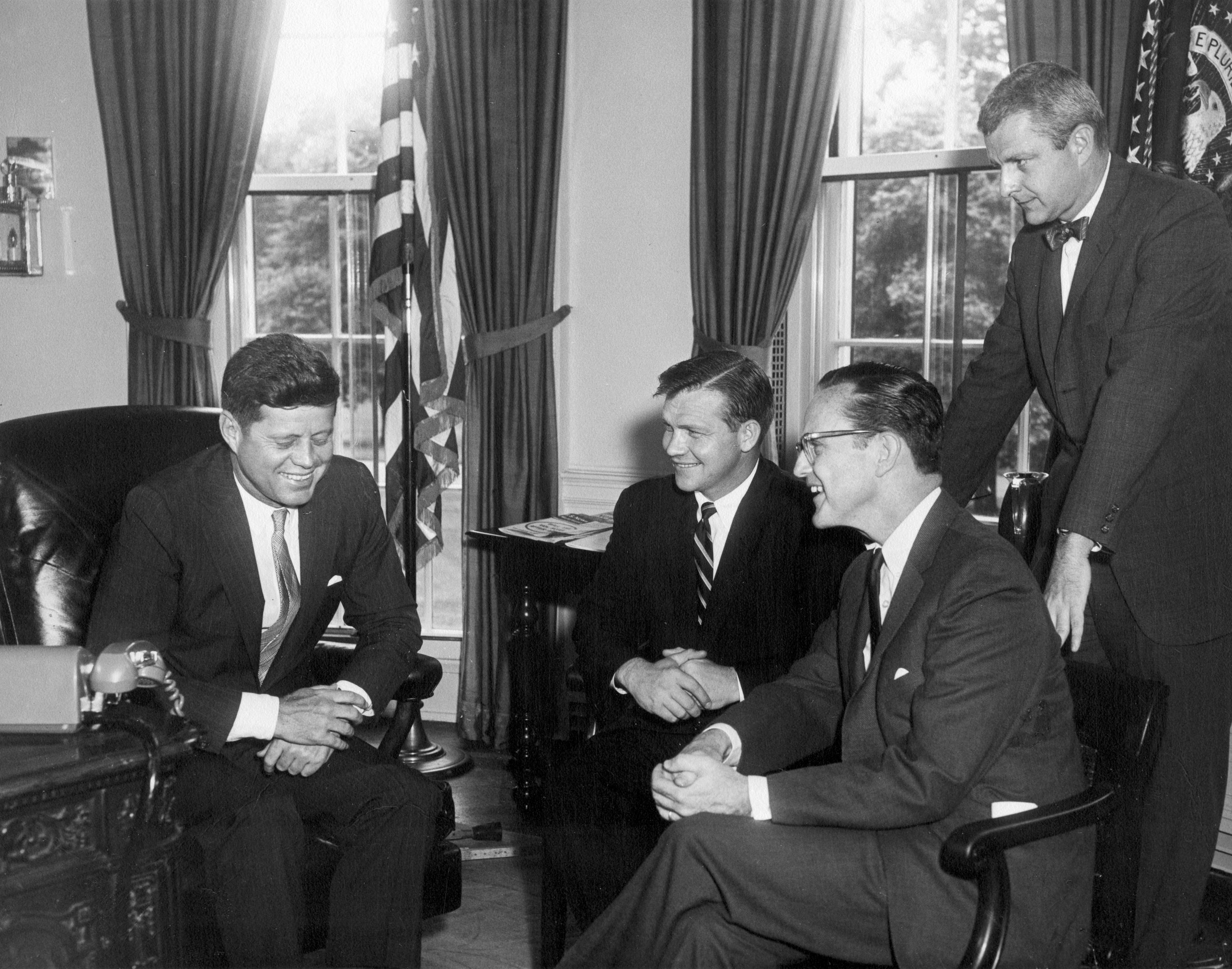
Hart (second from right) with Governor of Michigan John Swainson and President John F. Kennedy in the Oval Office in June 1961

Hart was elected as a Democrat to the United States Senate in the Democratic wave election of 1958, defeating one-term incumbent Republican Charles E. Potter by a 54% to 46% margin. He was reelected by overwhelming margins in 1964 and 1970. (His 1970 opponent was former Michigan First Lady Lenore Romney.) Some conservatives in Michigan attempted to recall Hart from office for his stands on gun control and busing for racial integration, with bumper stickers reading "Recall cures Hart attacks," but the U.S. Constitution does not authorize the recall of elected federal officials, and Hart was strongly re-elected by supporters.

Hart was the chief Senate sponsor of the Immigration and Nationality Act of 1965, also known as the Hart–Celler Act, which ended the quotas that restricted immigration from most of the world since 1924.

Hart died in office. He had announced his intention not to run for re-election in June 1976 and was diagnosed with cancer a month later. The same year, the Senate voted to name its new Senate office building after him, the Hart Senate Office Building. It would have been the first federal government building named after someone still living. The vote was 99–0, with Hart abstaining. He died of melanoma a few days later, just a week before his term would have expired. Donald W. Riegle, Jr., who had just been elected to the seat for the next term, was named to fill Hart's seat for the remaining days of the congressional session.

Hart is interred in St. Anne's Catholic Cemetery on Mackinac Island in a family plot near his namesake son, who died as a toddler.

== Honors ==
- In 1982, the Hart Senate Office Building, the third to be constructed, was officially dedicated and named for him.
- Other buildings named after Hart include the Hart–Dole–Inouye Federal Center in Battle Creek, Michigan; the Philip A. Hart Plaza along the Detroit International Riverfront; the Philip A. Hart Visitor Center of the Sleeping Bear Dunes National Lakeshore in Empire, Michigan; Hart Middle School in Rochester Hills, Michigan; and the Hart–Kennedy House in Lansing, the headquarters of the Michigan Democratic Party.
- The Philip Hart Memorial Scholarship was established at Lake Superior State University in Sault Ste. Marie, Michigan as a full scholarship, to be awarded to a student who exemplifies the ideals and goals of the Senator.
- The moot court room at Georgetown University Law Center is named in his honor.
- The visitor center at Sleeping Bear Dunes National Lakeshore is named after Hart, who first introduced the bill in Congress to establish the park in 1961.

== See also ==
- List of members of the United States Congress who died in office (1950–1999)

Party political offices
Preceded by Noel P. Fox	Democratic nominee for Michigan Secretary of State; 1950	Succeeded by Robert S. McAllister
Preceded by John W. Connolly	Democratic nominee for Lieutenant Governor of Michigan; 1954, 1956	Succeeded by John Swainson
Preceded by Blair Moody	Democratic nominee for U.S. Senator from Michigan (Class 1); 1958, 1964, 1970	Succeeded by Donald Riegle
Political offices
Preceded by Clarence A. Reid	Lieutenant Governor of Michigan; 1955–1959	Succeeded by John B. Swainson
U.S. Senate
Preceded by Charles E. Potter	U.S. senator (Class 1) from Michigan; 1959–1976; Served alongside: Patrick V. McNamara, Robert P. Griffin	Succeeded by Donald W. Riegle, Jr.
