= Charles E. Potter =

American politician (1916–1979)

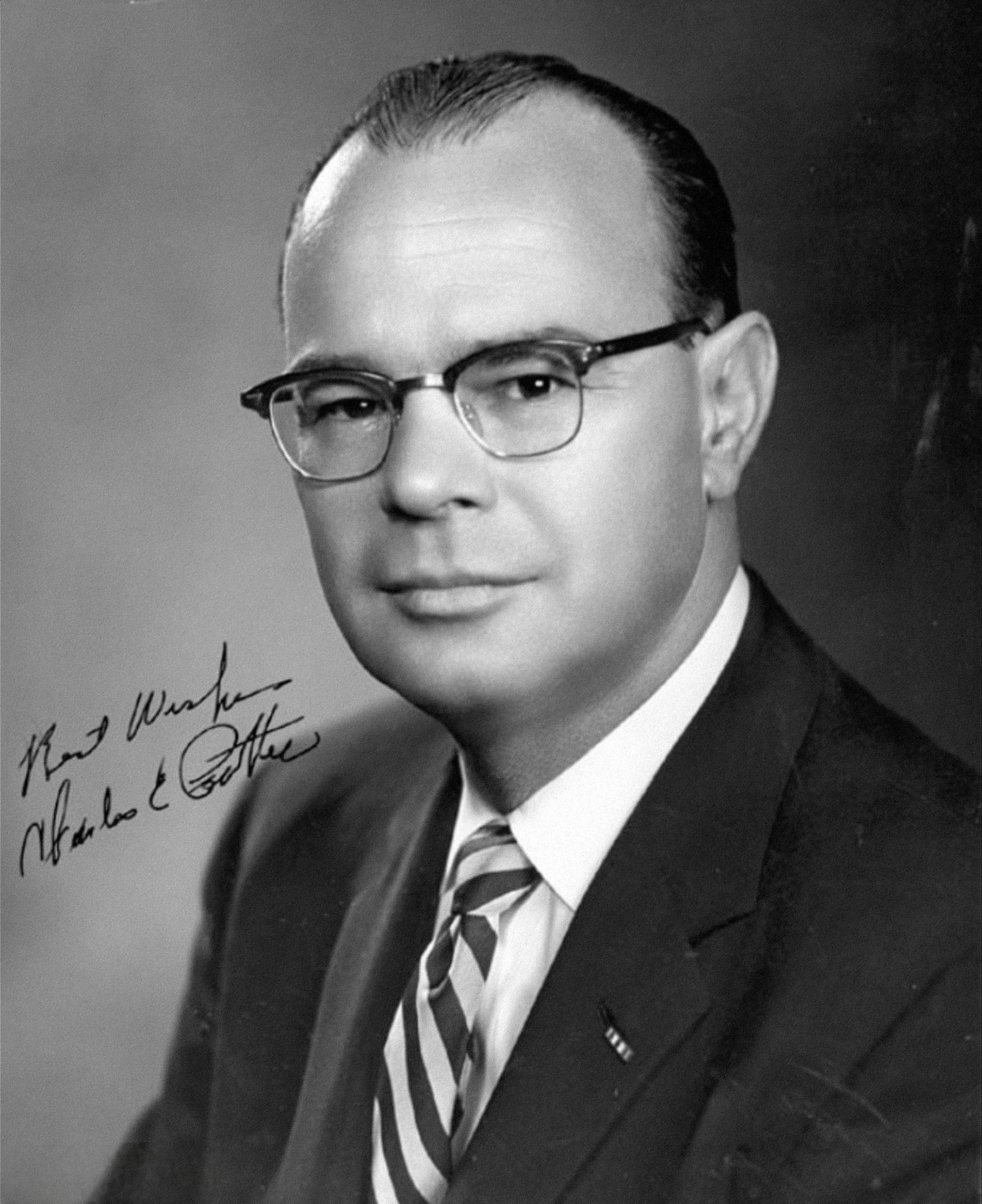
- Potter while serving, c. 1950s

United States Senator from Michigan
- In office November 5, 1952 – January 3, 1959
- Preceded by: Blair Moody
- Succeeded by: Philip Hart

Member of the U.S. House of Representatives from Michigan's 11th district
- In office August 26, 1947 – November 4, 1952
- Preceded by: Fred Bradley
- Succeeded by: Victor A. Knox

Personal details
- Born: Charles Edward Potter; October 30, 1916 Lapeer, Michigan, U.S.
- Died: November 23, 1979 (aged 63) Washington, D.C., U.S.
- Resting place: Arlington National Cemetery
- Party: Republican
- Spouses: Lorraine Eddy (m. 1939; div. 1960) Betty Bryant Wismer (m. 1960)
- Children: 1
- Education: Eastern Michigan University

Military service
- Allegiance: United States
- Branch/service: United States Army
- Years of service: 1942–1946
- Rank: Major
- Unit: US 28th Infantry Division
- Awards: Silver Star (2); Purple Heart; Croix de Guerre

Charles Edward Potter (October 30, 1916 – November 23, 1979) was a U.S. representative and a U.S. senator from the state of Michigan.

== Early life ==
Potter was born in Lapeer, Michigan, and attended the public schools there. He received an AB degree from Eastern Michigan University, Ypsilanti, Michigan, in 1938. He worked as an administrator of Bureau of Social Aid in Cheboygan County, Michigan, 1938–1942. In 1942, he enlisted as a private in the United States Army with combat service in the European Theater of Operations with the US 28th Infantry Division. He was seriously wounded at Colmar, Alsace, France, in 1945, resulting in the loss of both legs. He was discharged from the service as a major in 1946.

He was awarded the Silver Star twice, the French Croix de Guerre, and the U.S. Purple Heart. After the war, he was engaged as a vocational rehabilitation representative for the Retraining and Reemployment Administration with the United States Labor Department until his resignation in 1947.

== Congress ==
1954 TV interview

Potter was elected on August 26, 1947, as a Republican to the United States House of Representatives from Michigan's 11th congressional district for the 80th Congress to fill the vacancy caused by the death of Republican Fred Bradley. Political novice Potter won the nomination, by trading on his war injuries, over the Speaker of the Michigan House and two state senators. He was reelected to the two succeeding Congresses and served from August 26, 1947, until his resignation November 4, 1952.

He was elected to the United States Senate in 1952 to fill the vacancy caused by the death of Arthur H. Vandenberg, replacing Blair Moody, who had been appointed to the post. He served the remainder of Vandenberg's term, from November 5, 1952, to January 3, 1953. He was also elected in 1952 for the term commencing January 3, 1953, defeating Moody in both elections. He served until January 3, 1959, having been defeated for reelection to a second term in 1958 by Philip Hart.

In the House Potter was successful with six public bills, two dealing with the Great Lakes, one with veterans, and three with local issues. A member of the House Un-American Activities Committee, he spoke with the voice of an anti-communist, but in the Senate he voted to censure Sen. Joseph R. McCarthy. Potter voted in favor of the Civil Rights Act of 1957.

During his tenure, he served as the only member of the Subcommittee on Korean War Atrocities, investigating war crimes committed during the Korean War.

== Later career ==
After leaving Congress, Potter founded Potter International, a lobbying firm. He engaged as an industrial consultant and international securities executive. In his 1965 memoir, Days of Shame, he outlined the battle between moderate Republicans and Democrats to contend with Sen. Joseph R. McCarthy. Potter was a close confidante of President Dwight D. Eisenhower on this and other issues.

Potter was a Methodist and a member of American Legion, Amvets, Disabled American Veterans, Veterans of Foreign Wars, Eagles, Elks, Kiwanis, and the American Battle Monuments Commission. He resided in Queenstown, Maryland, until his death at Walter Reed Army Hospital, Washington, D.C. at the age of sixty-three.

Charles E. Potter is interred in Section 30 of Arlington National Cemetery, Fort Myer, Virginia.

== Bibliography ==
- Potter, Charles E. Days of Shame. New York: Coward-McCann, 1965.

== See also ==
- List of members of the House Un-American Activities Committee

== Notes ==
Party political offices
| Preceded by Arthur Vandenberg | Republican nominee for U.S. Senator from Michigan (Class 1); 1952, 1958 | Succeeded by Elly M. Peterson |
U.S. House of Representatives
| Preceded by Fred Bradley | United States Representative for the 11th congressional district of Michigan; August 26, 1947 – November 5, 1952 | Succeeded by Victor A. Knox |
U.S. Senate
| Preceded by Blair Moody | U.S. Senator (Class 1) from Michigan; November 5, 1952 – January 3, 1959 | Succeeded by Philip Hart |
