= Blair Moody =

American politician (1902–1954)

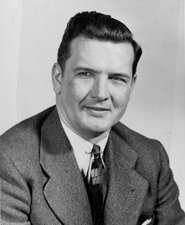

United States Senator from Michigan
- In office April 23, 1951 – November 4, 1952
- Appointed by: G. Mennen Williams
- Preceded by: Arthur H. Vandenberg
- Succeeded by: Charles E. Potter

Personal details
- Born: Arthur Edson Blair Moody; February 13, 1902 New Haven, Connecticut, US
- Died: July 20, 1954 (aged 52) Ann Arbor, Michigan, US
- Party: Democratic
- Spouse(s): Mary Ann Moody; Ruth Moody
- Relations: Mary Blair Moody (grandmother); Agnes Claypole Moody (aunt)
- Children: Blair Moody Jr.; Christopher Moody; Robin Moody
- Education: Brown University; University of Michigan

Arthur Edson Blair Moody (February 13, 1902 – July 20, 1954), known as Blair Moody, was a journalist and Democratic U.S. senator from the state of Michigan.

== Background ==
Moody was born in New Haven, Connecticut, the son of Arthur Edson Blair Moody and Julia Downey Moody. and attended the public schools in Providence, Rhode Island. He graduated from Brown University with a degree in economics in 1922. He was an instructor in history at the Moses Brown School, a preparatory school in Providence, in 1922–23.

A solid athlete, Moody lettered in football, baseball and track at Brown. He also was the heavyweight boxing champion at Brown at one time. He was offered a contract by the professional baseball team the St. Louis Cardinals to pitch, but declined.

== Career ==
=== Journalist ===
Moody moved to Detroit, Michigan and worked from 1923 to 1951 as a reporter covering Washington, D.C., for the Detroit News, a newspaper owned by his uncle, William Scripps. He was a correspondent for Barron's Financial Weekly from 1934 to 1948 and wrote for the North American Newspaper Alliance and the Bell Syndicate.

Moody was a combat war correspondent in 1944, covering the war in Italy, Africa, the United Kingdom, the Middle East, and Iran. He moderated a radio and television program Meet Your Congress from 1946 to 1952. He was a foreign correspondent during 1947–1948.

=== Government service ===
Following the death of U.S. Senator Arthur H. Vandenberg, Moody was appointed by Michigan Governor G. Mennen Williams on April 22, 1951, as a Democrat to the United States Senate. He served from April 23, 1951, to November 4, 1952. Moody was appointed to the Senate Banking and Currency Committee and the Committee on Expenditures in the Executive Departments. In July 1951, he was appointed to chair a subcommittee of Senate Small Business Committee, established to "protect the interests of small business in the defense program." The committee's purview included the perceived problem of steel cutbacks and unemployment in the auto industry. Moody also is remembered for his proposal for presidential debates, an idea that did not take hold until the 1960 Kennedy-Nixon televised debates. An unsuccessful candidate for election in 1952 (to the remainder of the unexpired Senate term), Moody lost to Republican Charles E. Potter in the Dwight D. Eisenhower presidential landslide.

=== Later years ===
Moody resumed his newspaper and television career as the host and moderator of the "Meet Your Congress" television show.

== Personal life and death ==
Blair Moody's father Arthur Blair Moody was the son of Mary Blair Moody.

Moody married his first wife Mary Ann in 1930 and they had a son, Blair Jr. They were divorced in 1940 and Blair Sr. married his second wife, Ruth, in 1941; the marriage lasted until his death in 1954. Blair and Ruth Moody had two sons, Christopher and Robin.

From 1946 until 1954, Blair Moody is reported to have had an affair with Helen Knowland, the wife of his friend Republican Senator William Knowland. William Knowland is said to have later begun an affair with Ruth Moody.

Moody died age 52 on July 20, 1954, in Ann Arbor, Michigan, while campaigning for the Democratic nomination for the other U.S. Senate seat from Michigan, of a heart attack following complications of viral pneumonia.

Blair Moody Jr. was a Wayne County Circuit Court Judge, and a Justice of the Michigan Supreme Court. Christopher S. Moody was founder and President of Moody & Associates, Inc., a nationwide insurance firm. Robert O. (Robin) Moody is the founder and President of Daedalus Books, established in 1980, the oldest independent bargain book wholesaler in America until its closure in 2024.

== Legacy ==
An elementary school in Taylor, Michigan, was named for Senator Blair Moody. The school is in its original location with its original name and continues to educate students. A second elementary school was built adjacent to it in the 1960s.

== Works ==
In 1941, Moody authored Boom or Bust, a book charting his post-World War II vision for American democracy. His focus was on transitioning to full employment, reducing the national debt, and identifying a strategy for "how the national budget may actually be balanced."

- Boom or Bust (1941)

== See also ==
- Blair Moody Jr.

Party political offices
Preceded by James H. Lee	Democratic nominee for U.S. Senator from Michigan (Class 1); 1952	Succeeded by Philip Hart
U.S. Senate
Preceded by Arthur H. Vandenberg	U.S. Senator (Class 1) from Michigan; 1951–1952	Succeeded by Charles E. Potter
