= Pratt family =

Latter Day Saint family

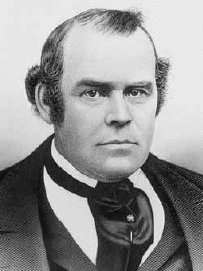
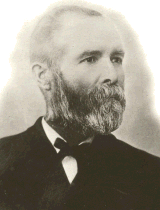
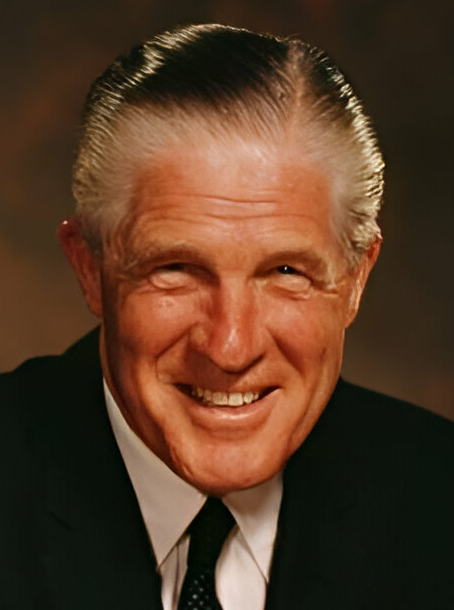
- Parley P. Pratt Helaman Pratt George W. Romney
- Current region: Predominantly; U.S. Intermountain West
- Founder: William Pratt
- Members: Parley P. Pratt, Orson Pratt, Sarah Pratt, George Romney, Jon Huntsman, Sr.
- Connected families: Huntsmans, Romneys, Smiths, Driggs Family

The Pratt family is made up of the descendants of the Mormon pioneer brothers Parley Parker Pratt and his brother Orson Pratt, whose father was Jared Pratt (1769–1839). It has many members in Utah and other parts of the U.S. There are many branches of the Pratt family, such as the Romney family (of Mitt Romney) and the Huntsman family.

== Pratts ==
Selected family members

- William Pratt (1609–1678) was an early colonial settler, a lieutenant in the Pequot War, and a representative to the General Court of Connecticut for 23 terms. William and his older brother John were two sons of Reverend William Pratt of England. William and John came to Massachusetts on the same ship as John Cotton and Thomas Hooker. Before that, William and John Pratt went with Thomas Hooker to Holland. Rev. Hooker and Rev Cotton attended the same college at Cambridge as Rev. William Pratt. All were strong believers in the Puritan movement. Rev. Hooker was an ardent believer in universal Christian suffrage and along with William and John Pratt broke away from Rev. Cotton of Massachusetts Bay Colony. They went on to found the Connecticut Colony, which on 14 January 1639 ratified "Fundamental Orders of Connecticut" which were inspired by the beliefs of Hooker. Connecticut is known as "The Constitution State" because of the hugely forward thinking of its founders, including the Pratt Brothers and Rev. Hooker who saw the future in American Democracy and freedom of Religion, as first espoused by its first truly Puritan Church leaders.
- Jared Pratt (1769–1839) was born in Canaan, New York, on November 25, 1769, the son of Obadiah Pratt and Jemina Tolls. He married Charity Dickinson in 1799, a descendant of Anne Hutchinson, and was father of Parley P. Pratt and Orson Pratt.
  - Anson Pratt (1801-1849), brother of Parley P. Pratt, married Sarah Sally Barber (1807-1841). He fought at the Battle of Nauvoo.
  - Parley P. Pratt (1807–1857) was an original Mormon Apostle and member of the Utah Territorial Legislature in 1854. He was the 3rd great-grandson of William Pratt. He married fourth wife Mary Ann Frost, sister of Olive Frost (who married Joseph Smith). His brother was Orson Pratt.
    - Helaman Pratt (1846-1909) was born outside Mt. Pisgah, Iowa, on May 31, 1846, the son of Parley P. Pratt and fourth wife Mary Wood. He married 1874 to second wife Anna Johanna Dorothy (Dora) Wilcken (the daughter of Charles Henry Wilcken), and was father of Anna Amelia Pratt (who married Gaskell Romney). He had three wives, marrying first wife Emeline Victoria Billingsley Pratt when she was sixteen. He was part of group of polygamous Mormons who fled the United States because of the federal government's opposition to polygamy, and would serve as president of the Mexican mission in Mexico City before moving to the state of Chihuahua.
      - Anna (Pratt) Romney (1876–1926)
      - Rey Pratt (1878–1931) was the son of Helaman Pratt and a member of the First Council of the Seventy, as well as president of the Mexican Mission, including in exile, during the Mexican Revolution, and on into the 1930s.
  - Orson Pratt (1811–1881) was an original Mormon Apostle and member of the Utah Territorial Legislature from 1869-1879. He was the brother of Parley P. Pratt.
  - Sarah Marinda Bates Pratt (1817–1888) was the first wife of Orson Pratt, and central to his 1842 excommunication from the LDS Church. She was one of the first outspoken critics of polygamy and founders of the Anti-Polygamy Society in Salt Lake City. She was excommunicated 4 October 1874, becoming a Mormon apostate.
    - Jane Elizabeth Pratt (October 27, 1837 – November 23, 1912), daughter of Anson and Sally, married Frederick Kesler (1816-1899). (Kesler was a bodyguard of Joseph Smith, served as a major in the militia corps of the Great Salt Lake Military District, was a justice of the peace, and director of the penitentiary.)
      - Alonzo Pratt Kesler (January 29, 1868 – February 1918), son of Jane Elizabeth and Frederick, married Donnette Smith (September 17, 1872 – September 15, 1961), a daughter of Joseph F. Smith. He was President of the Eastern States Mission and she served on the General Board of Relief Society
        - A. (Alonzo) Pratt Kesler (1905–1984) was the great-grandson of Jared Pratt. His mother was Donette Smith, a daughter of Joseph F. Smith. He was a Republican, serving as Salt Lake City Prosecuting Attorney between 1935–40, Assistant Salt Lake City Attorney between 1940–53, appointed U.S. Attorney by U.S. President Dwight Eisenhower in Utah between 1953–1961, and Utah Attorney General from 1961–1965. He was only the second person in Utah history to serve as both U.S. Attorney and state attorney general. Kesler served as Republican State Chairman in Utah from 1950–1953, and was a delegate to Republican National Convention from Utah in 1952. He was a member of the Republican National Committee between 1952–53.

=== Huntsmans ===
- Jon Huntsman, Jr. (born March 26, 1960, in Palo Alto, California) was the Governor of Utah between 2005–2009 and U.S. Ambassador to China from 2009 to 2011. He is the grandson of David B. Haight. (Huntsman is a descendant of Isabella Eleanor Marden Pratt, born September 1, 1854; died, April 23, 1912. Isabella married Franklin Alonzo Robison (July 29, 1851 – October 17, 1936), a sheriff of Millard County, Utah, and city councilman of Fillmore, Utah.)

== Family association ==
Jared Pratt Family Association
- Abbreviation: JPFA
- Formation: 1881
- Type: Non-profit organization
- Headquarters: Salt Lake City, Utah
- Region served: Worldwide
- President: Robert J. Grow
- Website: JPFA

The Jared Pratt Family Association is a family association that conducts primary genealogical research and preserves genealogical and other historical information on the Pratt family surname, especially the descendants of Mormon Pioneer Orson Pratt or of his brothers. The association takes its name from its founder, Orson Pratt's, father, Jared Pratt.

Orson Pratt was an apostle in the Church of Jesus Christ of Latter-day Saints, a professor at University of Nauvoo in Illinois. After Orson trekked to what is now Utah, he served, among other offices, as the LDS Church Historian and Recorder 1874–1881 and also established the basis for the LDS Church's genealogical endeavors. Pratt had begun in the early-1850s an extensive work on the descendants and family of William Pratt, the earliest ancestor of the Pratts to come to what is now the United States, in cooperation with Frederick W. Chapman, a Congregationalist minister. Chapman's book was published in 1864, and Orson Pratt and his family members used it to perform temple work on many family members, continuing the focus and leading to them organizing the family association 17 years later.

The association was chartered by its founder, Orson Pratt (in statement appended to the meticulous family genealogical data he had collected) "to collect and register therein, from generation to generation, the dates of births, marriages, places of residence and deaths of all the descendants of my four brothers and myself. ... It is to be hoped that all our posterity of whatever branch or name will be sufficiently interested to preserve their genealogy to the latest generation."

The association's president is Robert Grow, Ph.D. and one of the association's historians is Robert Grow's son, University of Southern Indiana professor Matthew Grow, now with the Joseph Smith Papers Project. According to the association, as of 2011 it possessed a computer database with 32,000 descendants of Jared Pratt and Charity Dickinson, believed to be half-complete. The association has published a newsletter since 1965.

== See also ==
- List of Mormon family organizations
- Pratt (surname)
- Charles Henry Wilcken
