= Gaskell Romney =

American patriarch of the Romney family (1871–1955)

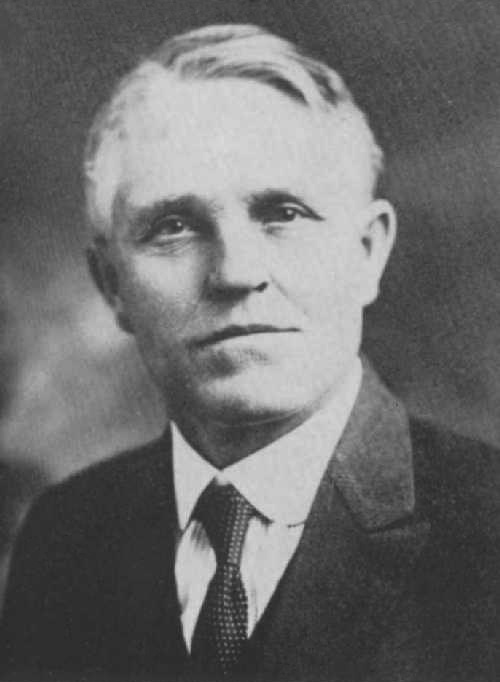
- Romney in 1917
- Born: September 22, 1871; Saint George, Utah Territory, U.S.
- Died: March 7, 1955 (aged 83); Salt Lake City, Utah, U.S.
- Occupation: Builder
- Spouse: Anna Amelia Pratt
- Children: 7, including George
- Father: Miles Park Romney
- Relatives: Romney family

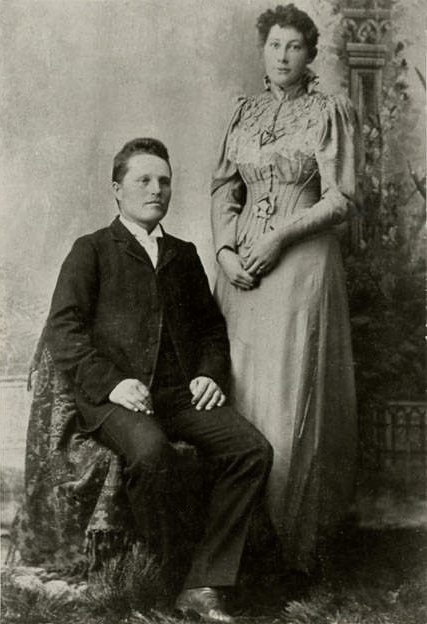
Wedding photo, 1895

Gaskell Romney (September 22, 1871 – March 7, 1955) was an American builder. He is regarded as a patriarch of the Romney family, a U.S. political family. Romney was born in St. George, in what was then the Utah Territory, to Miles Park Romney and Hannah Hood Hill.

Gaskell Romney moved to Mexico when his father helped to found the Mormon colony in Colonia Dublán, Galeana, Chihuahua, Mexico, in 1885. The Romney families lost their holdings in Chihuahua during the Mexican Revolution and in 1912 Romney moved back to the United States. Eventually he was reimbursed by the Mexican government for some of his losses. He was married in 1895 to Anna Amelia Pratt. Romney was the father of six sons and one daughter: Maurice, Douglas, Miles, George W. Romney, Lawrence, Charles and Meryl. Gaskell himself was a candidate for County Commissioner 1931 as a Republican. He died in Salt Lake City, Utah, on March 7, 1955, and is buried in Wasatch Lawn Memorial Park in the city.

== Extended families ==
A number of Romney's descendants have become prominent in U.S. politics. His son, George W. Romney, was a two-term governor of Michigan and a presidential cabinet member; his grandson, Mitt Romney, ran in the 2008 and 2012 presidential elections, and served one term as governor of Massachusetts and formerly served as the junior U.S. senator from Utah; and his great-granddaughter Ronna Romney McDaniel was the chair of the Republican National Committee until February 2024.

Through Romney's wife, there is an ancestral link with renowned early Mormon leader Parley Parker Pratt. The Romney clan is also linked by marriage to the Smith family, the Matheson family, and the Huntsman family. The Pratt family dates back to the 17th century in Connecticut, originating with William Pratt who served as a representative to the colonial legislature of the state for 23 terms. Miles Romney, patriarch of the Romney family, immigrated to the United States from Dalton-in-Furness, England, in the 1840s. Aside from politics and government, their legacy extends into other professions.

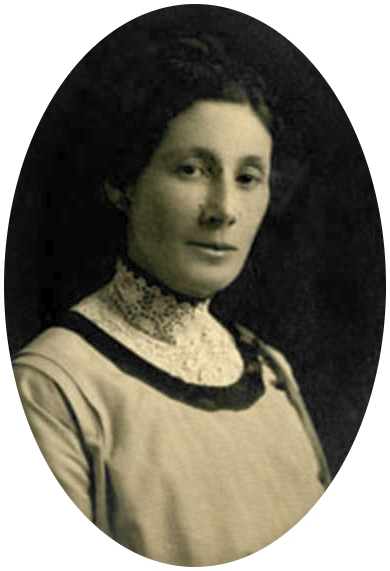
Anna Amelia Pratt Romney (1876–1926)
