= Romney family =

American political family

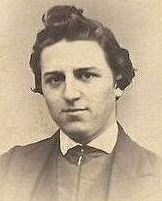
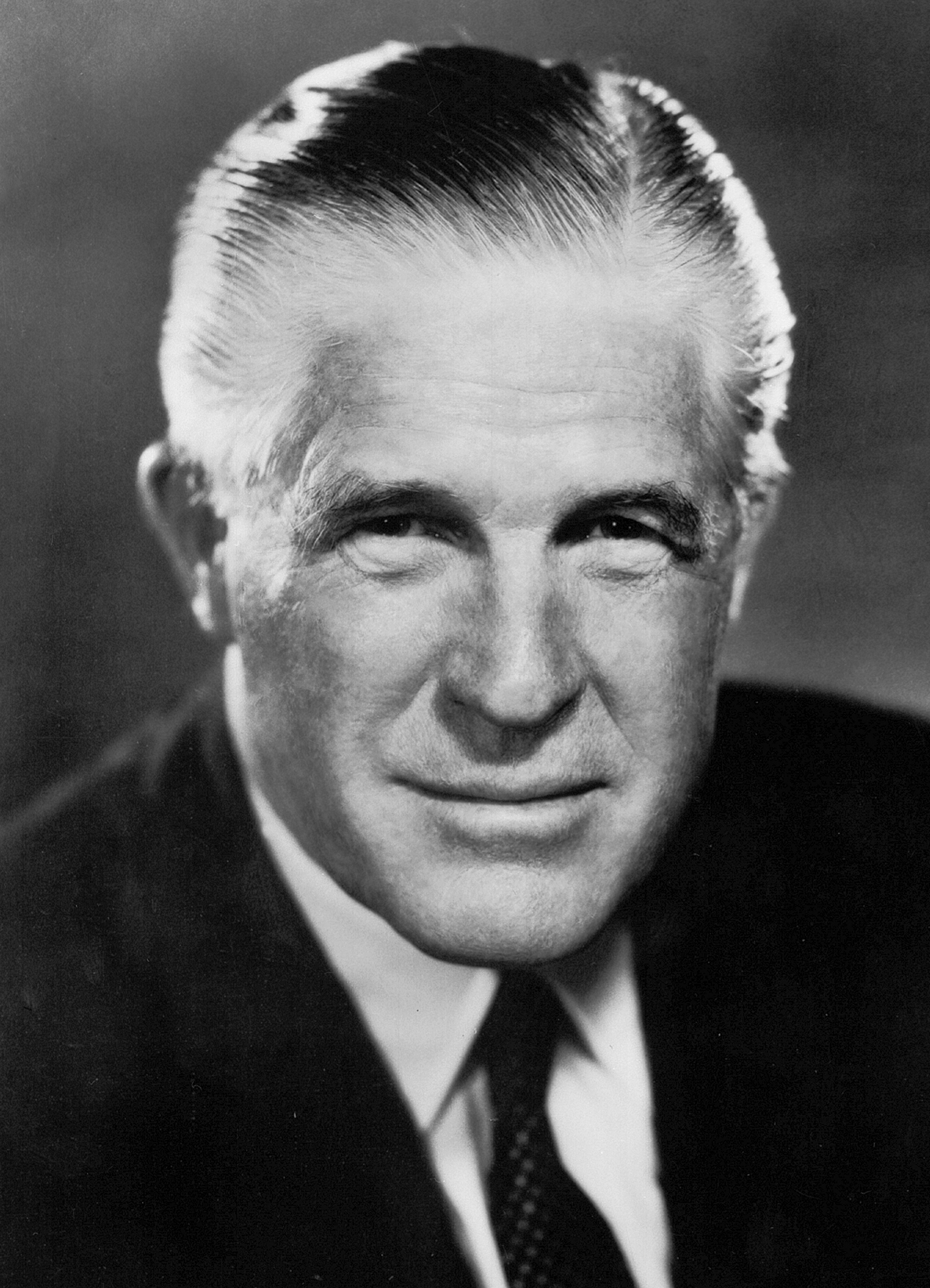
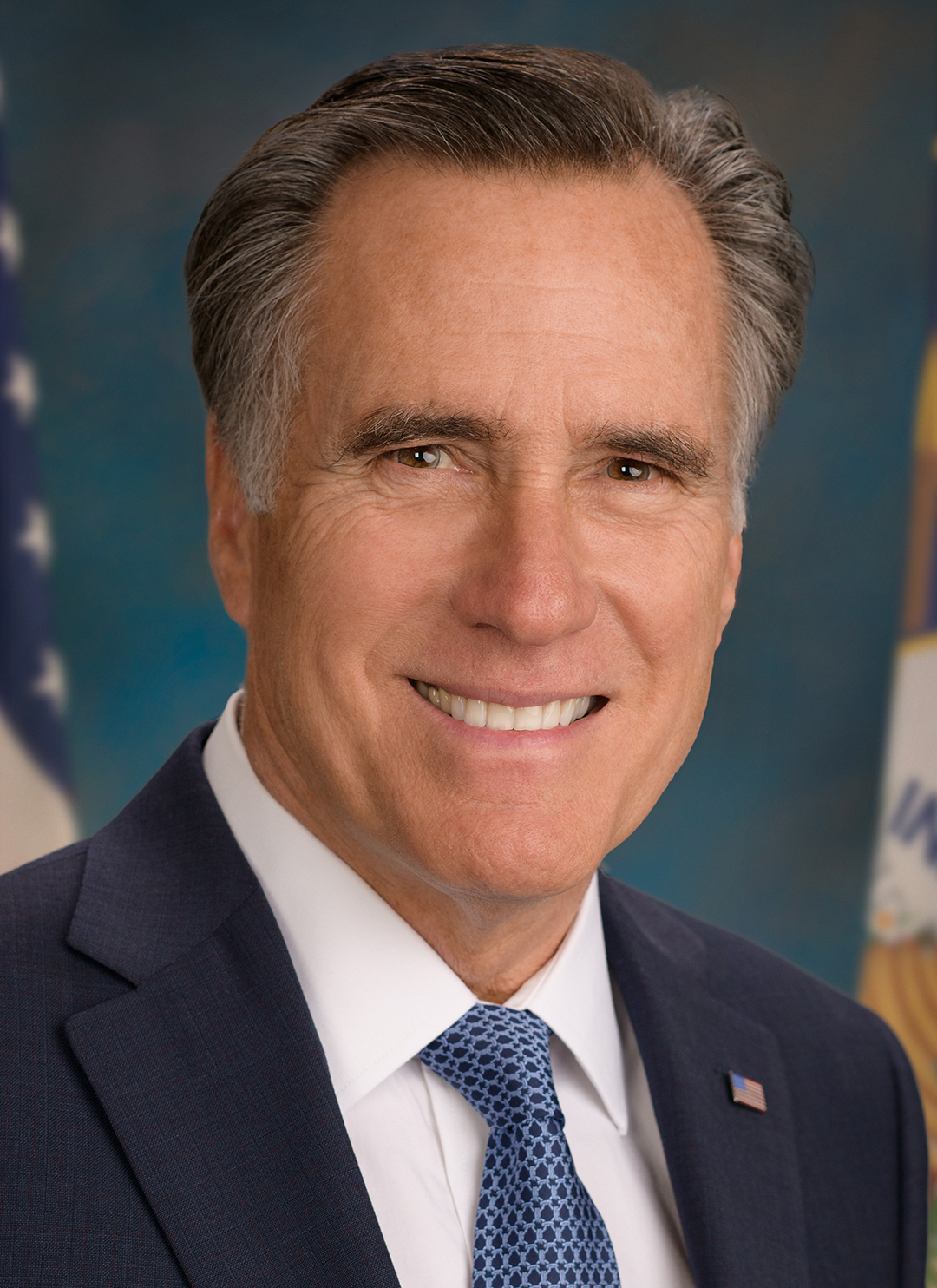
- Miles Park Romney George W. Romney Mitt Romney
- Current region: Utah, United States
- Origin: Dalton-in-Furness, England
- Founder: Miles Romney
- Current head: Mitt Romney
- Titles: List: United States Secretary of Housing and Urban Development; Governor (Michigan & Massachusetts); United States Senator (Utah); Attorney General of Utah; First Lady of Michigan; First Lady of Massachusetts
- Connected families: Matheson family, Pratt family, Smith family

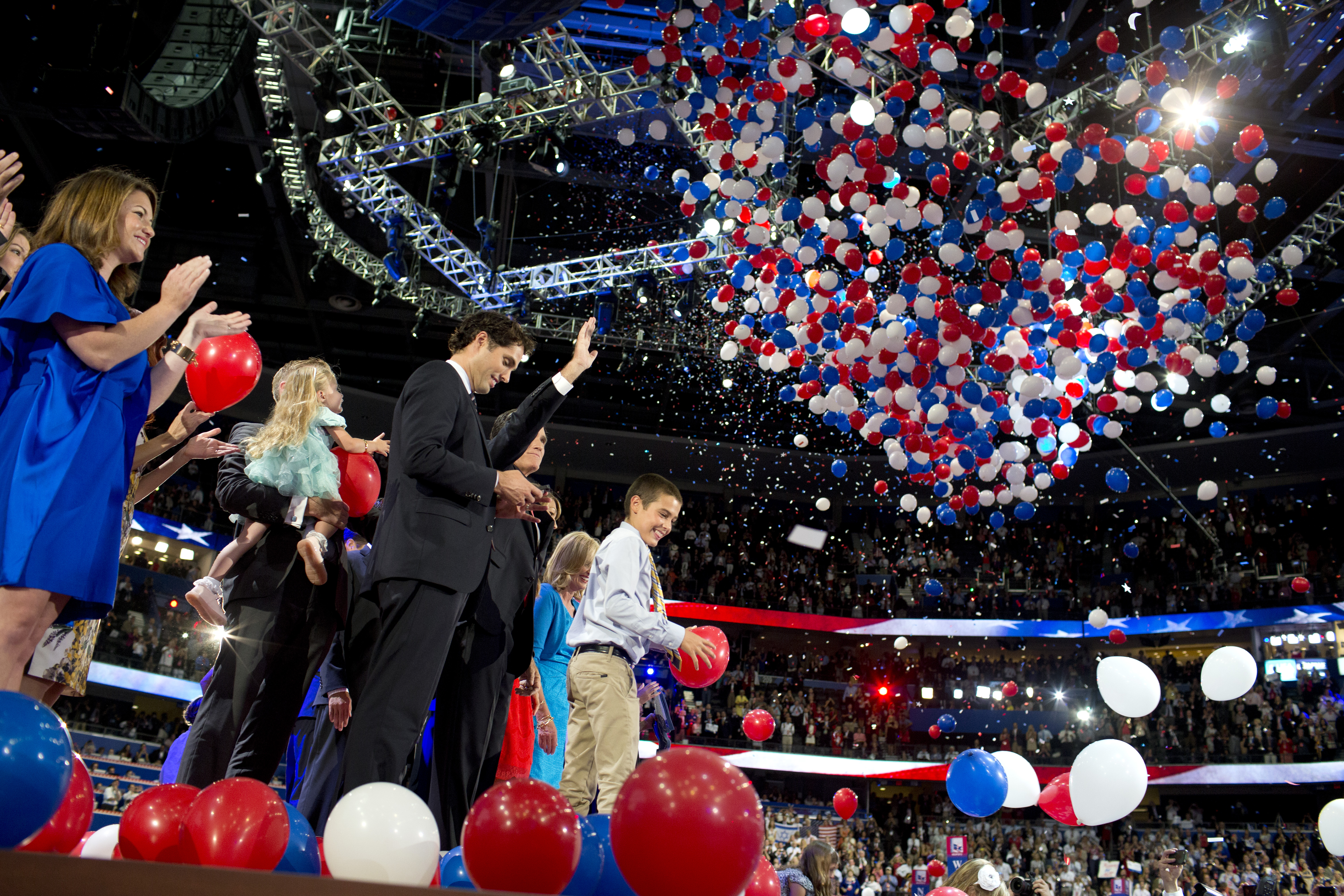
Members of the family at the 2012 Republican National Convention

The Romney family is a prominent American political family. Its family members include George W. Romney (1907–1995), the 43rd governor of Michigan (1963–1969), and his son, Mitt Romney (born 1947), who was the 70th governor of Massachusetts (2003–2007), the 2012 Republican U.S. presidential nominee, and later a U.S. senator for Utah (2019–2025). George W. Romney's father was Gaskell Romney (1871–1955), and his mother was Anna Amelia Pratt (1876–1926). Anna's grandfather was the renowned early Latter-day Saint apostle Parley Parker Pratt.

Authors Richard and Joan Ostling have written that the Romneys are "an LDS political dynasty" and "LDS royalty", based on the family's heritage and their modern-day prominence in business, politics and as part of the Church of Jesus Christ of Latter-day Saints. The family is linked by marriage to the Smith family, and has a lateral relationship with the Matheson family, the Huntsman family, and the Eyring family. A branch of the Romneys reside in the Mormon colonies in Mexico. The Romney family emigrated to the United States from Dalton-in-Furness, England in the 1840s.

== Family members ==
Miles Romney (1806–1877) was born in Dalton-in-Furness, Lancashire (now in Cumbria), on July 13, 1806. He was the son of George Romney, Jr. (whose father, George Romney, Sr. was first cousin to the English portrait painter also named George Romney) and Sarah King. He married Elizabeth Gaskell (1809-1884) on November 16, 1830, in Dalton-in-Furness and both were converts to the LDS Church. He was an architect and designed the St. George Tabernacle and Brigham Young Winter Home and Office, the latter with his son, Miles Park Romney. Miles Romney died in St. George, Utah, on May 3, 1877.

- George Romney (1831 – 1920) was a son of Miles Romney and Elizabeth Gaskell. He married Jane Jamieson (1850–?) and Vilate Ellen Douglas. He was a Bishop with the LDS church and played a role in the early development of the state of Utah.

- Miles Quintin Romney (1919–1998), son of Miles and Laura, was an attorney of the U.S. House of Representatives and a poet.

- Clyde Romney, the son of Miles Alonzo, married Almera Anderson. He was a salesman and Almera was a school principal.

- Clyde Anderson Romney (1943–2006), the son of Clyde and Almera, was the Chief of Staff in Washington, D.C., to U.S. Congressman Ron Packard of California from 1983 to 1986. A graduate of Stanford University, he was Bishop of the LDS Church San Dieguito Ward between 1974 and 1979 and Bishop of the LDS Church Carlsbad Ward. He served as LDS Church Regional Public Affairs Director for the county of San Diego and Bishop of the LDS Church Palomar Ward, Escondido South Stake from 1998 to 2006. Clyde was Chairman of the San Luis Rey Indian Water Rights Task Force and Congressional Facilitator of the San Luis Rey settlement act. Romney was candidate for the San Diego County board of supervisors in 1986 and the Palomar College Board of Trustees in 1988. He was a Republican.

- G. Ott Romney (1892–1973) was born in Salt Lake City, the son of George Ernst and Hannah, and died in Alexandria, Virginia. He was the third head football coach at Brigham Young University, coaching for nine years from 1928 to 1936. His national positions included chairman of the National Recreation Policies Committee, national director of the Recreation Section of the Works Progress Administration or WPA, assignments with the American Alliance of Health, Physical Education and Recreation, and membership on U.S. President Dwight D. Eisenhower's Council on Youth Fitness. During World War II he served as chief of recreation and club unit services to the United States Armed Forces through the Red Cross. He married Ruth Harding in 1919, and they were parents of three children – two girls and one boy.

- Miles Park Romney (1843–1904) was born in Nauvoo, Illinois, to Miles Romney and Elizabeth Gaskell. He married Hannah Hood Hill in Salt Lake City, Utah on May 10, 1862. He was the president of the St. George Social Hall Company and the St. George Dramatic Association, and also served as a chief of police, attorney-at-law, newspaper editor, and architect. He also married Caroline ("Carrie") Lambourne, Catharine Jane Cottam, Annie Maria Woodbury and Emily ("Millie") Henrietta Eyring Snow as plural wives.

- Helen Hackett Brown Romney (1917–2004) was the wife of Vernon Romney. She was the Vice Chairman of Utah Republican Party, and served on the State Health Board as well as the State Parks and Recreation Board. She was a Founding and Charter Member of Utah State Heritage Foundation. Her first husband Vernon C. Brown (1912–1955).

- Vernon B. Romney (1924–2013), son of Vernon C. and first cousin of George W., served two terms as Attorney General of the State of Utah from 1969 to 1976. He was defeated in a 1976 bid for governor. He was married to Patricia (Pingree) Romney.

- Keith Bradford Romney (1929–2015) was a son of Vernon Romney. In 1960, the first condominium in the continental United States was built in Salt Lake City, Utah. The legal counsel for the project, Keith B. Romney is also credited with authoring the Utah Condominium Act of 1960. Romney also played an advisory role in the creation of condominium legislation with every other legislature in the U.S. Business Week hailed Romney as the "Father of Condominiums". He soon after formed a partnership with Don W. Pihl called "Keith Romney Associates", which was widely recognized throughout the 1970s as America's preeminent condominium consulting firm. He was a largest financial supporter his brother, politician Vernon B. Romney.

- Miles Archibald Romney (November 9, 1869 – November 28, 1939) was a son of Miles Park Romney and Hannah Hood Hill. After wedding Frances Turley in 1889, he married three sisters, Lily, Elizabeth and Emily Burrell, from 1898 to 1909.

- Keith Romney (1913–2003), son of Miles, was automobile dealer and LDS Church branch president in Las Cruces, New Mexico 1941–1950. He was a member of the El Paso Stake Presidency from 1952 to 1962, bishop of the Las Cruces Ward 1962–65, mission president of the West Spanish American Mission in Los Angeles, California between 1965–67, and president of the Southeast Mexican Mission, Vera Cruz, Mexico from 1967–69. He was Stake Patriarch in August 1974 and member of Honorary Spanish Society at New Mexico State University, receiving the Master M Men award in 1972.

- Gaskell Romney (1871–1955) was born in St. George, Utah, to Miles Park Romney and Hannah Hood Hill. He married Anna Amelia Pratt in Colonia Dublán, Galeana, Chihuahua, Mexico, on February 20, 1895. He was the father of six sons and one daughter: Maurice, Douglas, Miles Pratt Romney, George W. Romney, Lawrence and Charles, and daughter Meryl who married Lavell G. Ward of Bloomington, Idaho. Gaskell would be a candidate for County Commissioner 1931 as a Republican. He died in Salt Lake City, Utah, on March 7, 1955, and is buried Wasatch Lawn Memorial Park in the city.

- Anna Amelia (Pratt) Romney's parents were Helaman Pratt and Anna Johanna Dorothy Wilcken, a daughter of Charles Henry Wilcken, both of whom had been born in Schleswig-Holstein. Pratt married Gaskell Romney on February 20, 1895, in the Mormon colonies in Mexico and was the mother of George W. Romney.

- George W. Romney (Mexico, 1907–1995) was the CEO of American Motors Corporation between 1954 and 1962 and Governor of Michigan from 1963 to 1969. Romney was a U.S. presidential candidate in 1968 and Secretary of Housing and Urban Development between 1969–1973. He was a great-grandson of Parley P. Pratt.

- Lenore Romney (1909–1998) was married to George W. Romney and is the mother of Mitt Romney. She was a daughter of Harold Arundel LaFount, and was a Republican candidate for U.S. Senator from Michigan in 1970.

- Mitt Romney (b. 1947), son of George W., was Governor of Massachusetts from 2003 to 2007 and a U.S. presidential candidate in 2008 and 2012, and was the junior United States senator from Utah from 2019 to 2025. He was LDS Church bishop in Belmont, Massachusetts, from 1982 to 1985 and LDS Church stake president in Boston from 1985 to 1994, and in 1995 helped facilitate permission for the LDS Church to build the Boston Massachusetts Temple in Belmont, Massachusetts.

- Ann Romney (b. 1949) is married to Mitt Romney and from 2003 to 2007 was First Lady of Massachusetts. She is the daughter of Edward Roderick Davies.

- Tagg Romney (b. 1970), son of Mitt and Ann, has worked as the head of marketing for the Los Angeles Dodgers. He is a graduate of BYU and Harvard. Tagg has been a partner in the private equity firm Solamere Capital.

- Scott Romney (b. 1941), son of George W., was a trustee at the Michigan State University and candidate for Michigan Attorney General in 1998. He is an attorney at Honigman Miller Schwartz and Cohn in Michigan and serves on several boards, including Compuware Corporation.

- Ronna Romney (b. 1943) is the former wife of Scott and a radio talk show host and a member of several boards of directors. As a Republican, she was an alternate delegate to the Republican National Convention from Michigan in 1988 and also member of Republican National Committee from the state that year. She ran for the Republican nomination in the 1994 U.S. Senate election from Michigan but lost to Spencer Abraham. G. Scott and Mitt endorsed her, but her former father-in-law George W. supported Abraham. She gained the Republican nomination in the 1996 U.S. Senate election from Michigan, but lost in the general election to Carl Levin.

- Ronna Romney McDaniel is a daughter of Scott and Ronna. She was chair of the Republican National Committee from 2017 to 2024, having been elected to the post after serving as chair of the Michigan Republican Party.

- Miles Romney Sr. (December 18, 1872 – March 31, 1943) was a Democrat and member of the State Democratic Central Committee in Montana. He was mayor of Hamilton, Montana, from 1902 to 1904 and served as a Montana state senator from Ravalli County between 1906 and 1910. He was unsuccessful in three primary bids for Montana governor. Romney served as State Director of the National Recovery Act and also organized the Federal Housing Administration in Montana and the National Emergency Council, which became the U.S. Office of Government Reports. He was president of the Montana Press Association and publisher of the newspaper Hamilton Western News.

- Miles Romney Jr. (December 6, 1900 – February 19, 1976) was a member of the Montana House of Representatives between 1966 and 1970. In 1971, he was elected as a delegate to the state constitutional convention and was appointed to the Montana Senate in 1973 and elected to a full term in 1974. Romney was the publisher of the newspaper Hamilton Western News.

- Erastus Romney (March 13, 1886 – February 12, 1920) was born in Colonia Dublán, Galeana, Chihuahua, Mexico, the son of Miles Park Romney and Annie Marie Woodbury. He married Roxie Maria Stowell on August 31, 1910, in Salt Lake City, Utah. He served as president of Dixie Normal College from 1918 until his death in 1920. He was the father of Elwood Romney.

- Elwood Romney (May 28, 1911 – August 24, 1970) was born in Salt Lake City, Utah. A gifted basketball player, Romney was an All-American at Brigham Young University (BYU), leading the Cougars to two Rocky Mountain Conference championships. He was named a consensus All-American in 1931 and 1932. After his playing career he coached basketball at Western State College and the Colorado School of Mines, and then owned the Denver Bears professional baseball franchise and was a founder of the Western League, serving as president. Elwood Romney was inducted into the BYU Athletics Hall of Fame, the Helms Athletic Foundation Hall of Fame and the Utah Sports Hall of Fame. Romney was married to Ruth Hafen on June 26, 1928. They had three children: Jerry Elwood Romney, Janice Ruth Romney, and Jean Romney.

=== Descendants of Miles Romney ===
- Melbourne Romney III (born 1948) is an officer and shareholder in the firm Pritchett Siler & Hardy PC. He also works in the area of real estate transactions and 1031 exchanges. He is president of Romney Lumber Company in Salt Lake City and married to Karen Greene (b. 1949). Son of Melbourne Romney Jr and Janice McCune Romney. Grandson of Melbourne Romney (1895–1973) and LaRue Peterson Romney. Great-grandson of Orson Douglas Romney (1860–1941) (brother of Miles Alonzo Romney) and Emma Phillips Romney. Great-great-grandson of George Romney (1831–1920) and Vilate Ellen Douglas Romney. Great-great-great-grandson of Miles Romney and Elisabeth Gaskell.
- Marshall B. Romney (born 1947) obtained a Ph.D. in accounting in 1977 and is a professor at Marriott School of Management at the Brigham Young University. He is the author of several books. He was mission president in the Dominican Republic for the LDS Church 1988–1991. Son of Ianthus Barlow Romney (1919–1998) and Eleanore Brown (1922–2001), grandson of Eugene Romney (1883–1946) and Ethel Ventencia Call (1886–1985), great-grandson of Miles Park Romney, and great-great grandson of Miles Romney.
- Brent Wayne Romney earned his BS and MAcc in accountancy from BYU in 1982, with an emphasis in audit. He has served as corporate director of internal audit at various companies including FirstPlus, UICI and Trammell Crow. He was president of the National BYU Alumni Board in the early 2000s and has served as president of the Dallas/Ft. Worth chapter of the BYU Management Society, chair of the Dallas/Ft. Worth chapter of the BYU Alumni Association and chair of the Religious Communities Task Force for the Dallas Independent School District. He is also a former president of the Church of Jesus Christ of Latter-day Saints' Mexico Monterrey West Mission, serving with his wife from 2009-2012, and is a former president of the Dominican Republic Missionary Training Center, serving with his wife from 2015-2017. He and his wife, Ella Ann McDaniel, have six children. Son of Ianthus Barlow Romney (1919–1998) and Eleanor Brown (1922–2001), great-grandson of Miles Park Romney, and great-great grandson of Miles Romney. Brother of Marshall B. Romney.
- George S. Romney (1874 – December 19, 1935) was president of Ricks Academy 1917–1930, now Brigham Young University–Idaho and was also known as Ricks Normal College from 1917–1923 and Ricks College from 1923–2001. He was president of the Northern States Mission of LDS Church between 1930–1935. Romney's son was Marion G. Romney. Romney was uncle of George W. Romney.

- Marion G. Romney (September 19, 1897 – May 20, 1988) was an apostle in the Church of Jesus Christ of Latter-day Saints and cousin to George W. Romney. He was elected to the Utah state legislature in 1934 as a Democrat. Marion G. Romney was an assistant prosecuting attorney in Salt Lake City.

== Lafounts ==
George Romney's wife Lenore LaFount's family of origin:

- Harold Arundel Lafount born in Birmingham, Warwick, England January 5, 1880, died Detroit, Mich., October 21, 1952. Used the spelling "Lafount". Commissioner of Federal Radio Commission (FRC) 1927-1934, nominated by U.S President Calvin Coolidge. He later managed a number of well-known radio stations in the northeastern United States and was president of the National Independent Broadcasters. He was the father of Lenore Romney, the father-in-law of businessman and politician George W. Romney, and the maternal grandfather of businessman and politician Mitt Romney. He was the son of Robert Arthur Lafount, who also preferred "Lafount".

== Others ==
- Baylor Romney attended BYU from 2018 to 2021, where he played quarterback.
- L. C. Romney was a Democratic commissioner of Salt Lake City. He was the Democratic nominee for Governor of Utah in 1956. A baseball field appearing in the movie The Sandlot was named L.C. Romney Baseball Park.
- John B. Romney is vice president of The Huntsman World Senior Games.
- John P. Romney earned an MBA from Arizona State University and a BS in business administration from Brigham Young University. He was managing director of the Restructuring Advisory Services and the Capital Markets departments for Ernst & Young in Dallas, Texas, from 1991 to 2003. From 2003 to 2004 he served as senior managing director for Howard Frazier Barker Elliott, Inc., supervising merger and acquisition advisory services and private placements. He is now at Levine Leichtman Capital Partners as a director and member of the firm's deal origination group since 2004.
- Jerry E. Romney, Jr. (1953–2009) attended the University of Utah from 1972 to 1978. From 1980 until its sale in 1986, he founded and served as president of "National Inn-Formation Network" a company promoting "video magazines" for broadcast in hotels. Mr. Romney was the founder of Teltrust, Inc. and served as its president from 1986 to 1998. Mr. Romney also founded the Utah Pay Phone Association in 1986 (serving as its president until 1994). From 1990 to 1998 he served as a director of the "A.P.C.C.," lobbying for a fair competitive marketplace and was instrumental in having language to that effect added to the Telecom Act of 1996. He was president and a director of Videolocity, Inc. until 2002 and is a managing partner for Video Renditions LLC.
- Robert E. Romney is a senior director of Marvell Semiconductor Inc. in California since 2006 and serves on the Leadership Council at the Bren School of Information and Computer at UC-Irvine. He was founder, president, and CEO of Zenographics Inc. in California from 1979 to 2006. Zenographics is a privately held, Southern California-based software and firmware development company located in the University of California, Irvine (UCI) Research Park. The company has been supplying technologies to the OEM imaging and printing systems industry for over 15 years.
- Larry Romney. Larry Romney joined the Arizona Farm Bureau on April 1, 1993, and is an agent with the Old Pueblo Agency at the Safford office. Romney was a member of Town Council of Chino Valley and was a president of Chino Valley School District.
- John R. Marshall, M.D., helped orchestrate the world's first embryonic transfer. He is clinical professor of obstetrics and gynecology at the David Geffen School of Medicine at UCLA, adjunct professor at the Mercer University School of Medicine in Savannah, and adjunct professor of public health at Georgia Southern University. For 17 years he served as professor of obstetrics and gynecology at UCLA, vice chairman of the Department of Obstetrics and Gynecology at UCLA, and chairman of the Department of Obstetrics and Gynecology and residency program director of the Obstetrics and Gynecology Residency Program at the Harbor/UCLA Medical Center. Dr. Marshall, along with Dr. John Buster, was one of the developers of the technique that resulted in the first successful transfer of a conceptus from the uterus of a donor to the uterus of a recipient with a resulting live birth. He has been a principal in three start-up medical companies and has been involved in medical and pharmaceutical marketing for over 20 years. He currently serves as a medical advisor to Counsyl. He is the author of over 100 scientific publications and has served as an examiner for the American Board of Obstetrics and Gynecology, as chairman of the Obstetrics and Gynecology Test Committee of the National Board of Medical Examiners, and on the editorial board of Obstetrics and Gynecology.
- Dave Romney is an American professional soccer player who plays as a defender for Major League Soccer club San Jose Earthquakes.

== Places and awards ==
- George W. Romney Institute of Public Management at Brigham Young University
- Jon M. Huntsman School of Business at Utah State University
- General Services Administration Miles Romney Achievement Award

== See also ==
- George Romney (disambiguation)
- Republican Party presidential primaries, 2012
- Charles Henry Wilcken
- Edward Roderick Davies
- List of Mormon family organizations

== Sources ==
- short bio of Ballif
- The Ariel S. Ballif Jr. Papers
