= George M. Cannon House =

Historic house in Salt Lake City, Utah, U.S.

- U.S. National Register of Historic Places
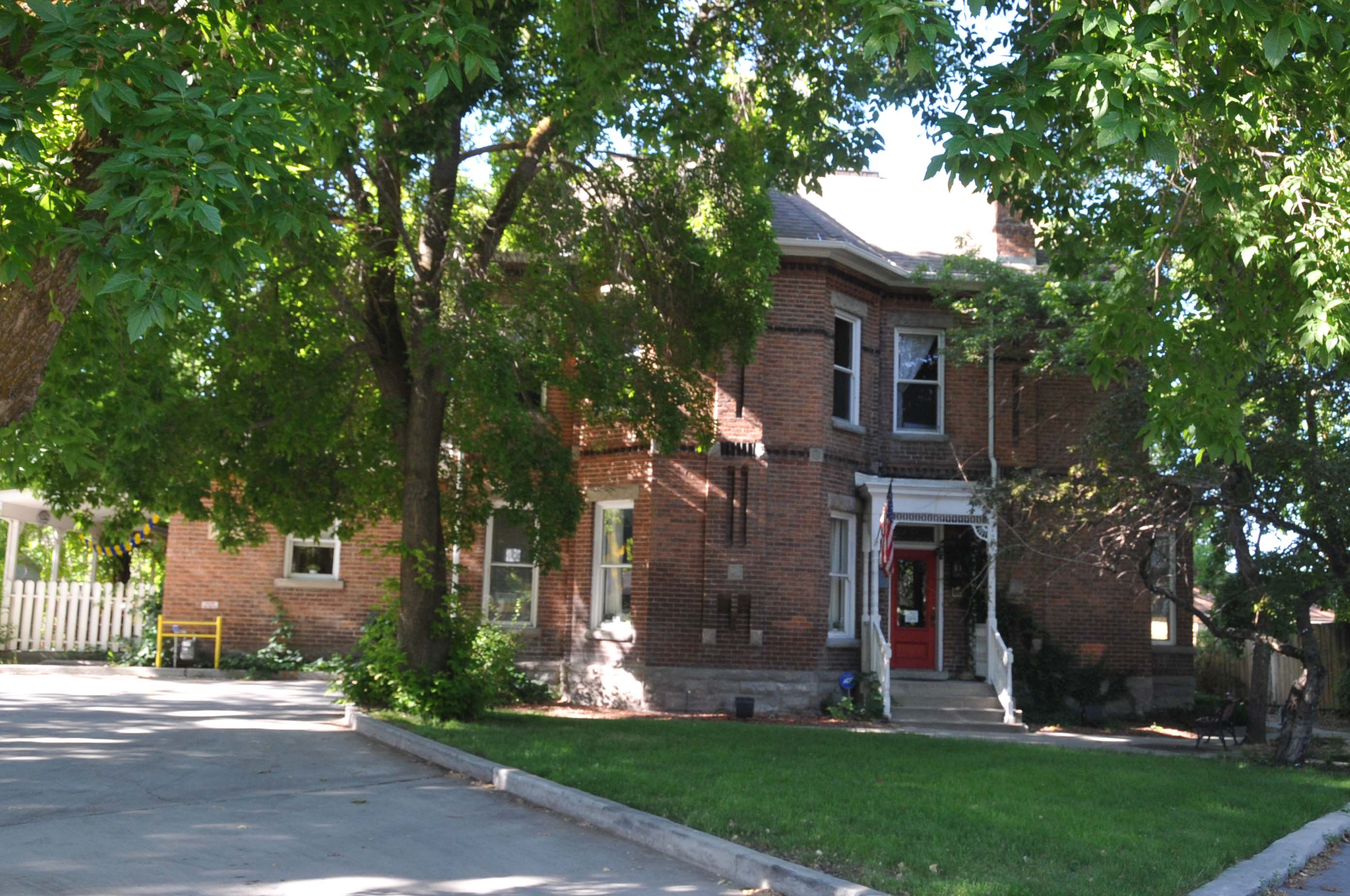

- Location within Utah Location within the United States
- Location: 720 E. Ashton Ave. Salt Lake City, Utah
- Coordinates: 40°43′10″N 111°52′11″W
- Area: less than one acre
- Built: 1890
- Architect: John A. Headlund
- Architectural style: Late Victorian, High Victorian Eclectic
- NRHP reference No.: 83004419
- Added to NRHP: July 18, 1983

The George M. Cannon House, built in 1890, is an historic Late Victorian mansion located at 720 East Ashton Avenue (2340 South) in the Forest Dale area of Salt Lake City, Utah. It was designed by noted Salt Lake architect John A. Headlund for George Mousley Cannon (December 25, 1861 – January 23, 1937), a member of the Cannon family, a prominent Intermountain West political family. In 1889 George M. Cannon had bought Forest Farm from the estate of Brigham Young and created the subdivision of Forest Dale and later the larger town of Forest Dale, which existed from 1902 until 1912, when it was reabsorbed into Salt Lake City. Brigham Young's Forest Farmhouse was moved in 1975 from its location near this house to the This Is The Place Heritage Park for restoration.

On July 18, 1983, the George M. Cannon House was added to the National Register of Historic Places (NRHP). It is the only separately listed property in the Forest Dale Historic District, which was added to the NRHP on April 23, 2009.

The George M. Cannon House was the Parrish Place Bed and Breakfast, so called because each of its guest rooms is named for a different Maxfield Parrish painting. Its previous owners are Jeff and Karin Gauvin, whose 2006 quest to purchase the house was featured on HGTV's House Hunters. Reruns of the program have been shown as recently as October 19, 2009.

== See also ==
- National Register of Historic Places listings in Salt Lake City
