= Mousley =

Mousley is an English surname. Notable people with the surname include:

- Bradley Mousley (born 1996), Australian tennis player
- George Mousley Cannon (1861–1937), first president of the Utah State Senate
- Kay Mousley, Electoral Commissioner for the Electoral Commission of South Australia
