= Prattville (disambiguation) =

Prattville is the name of several communities in the United States:

- Prattville, Alabama
- Prattville, California
- Prattville, Michigan
- Prattville, Mississippi
- Prattville, Oklahoma
- Prattville, Utah

== See also ==
- Prattsville (disambiguation)
