= George Romney =

George Romney may refer to:

- George Romney (painter) (1734–1802), English portrait painter
- George S. Romney (1874–1935), president of the college now known as Brigham Young University-Idaho
- G. Ott Romney (1892–1973), American football player, coach and college athletics administrator
- George W. Romney (1907–1995), businessman, Governor of Michigan, U.S. presidential candidate, Secretary of Housing & Urban Development, Mitt Romney's father
- George Scott Romney (born 1941), Michigan lawyer and politician, son of George W. Romney and brother of Mitt Romney

== See also ==
- Romney family
- Romney (disambiguation)
