= Forest Dale Historic District =

Historic district in Salt Lake City, Utah, U.S.

- U.S. National Register of Historic Places
- U.S. Historic district
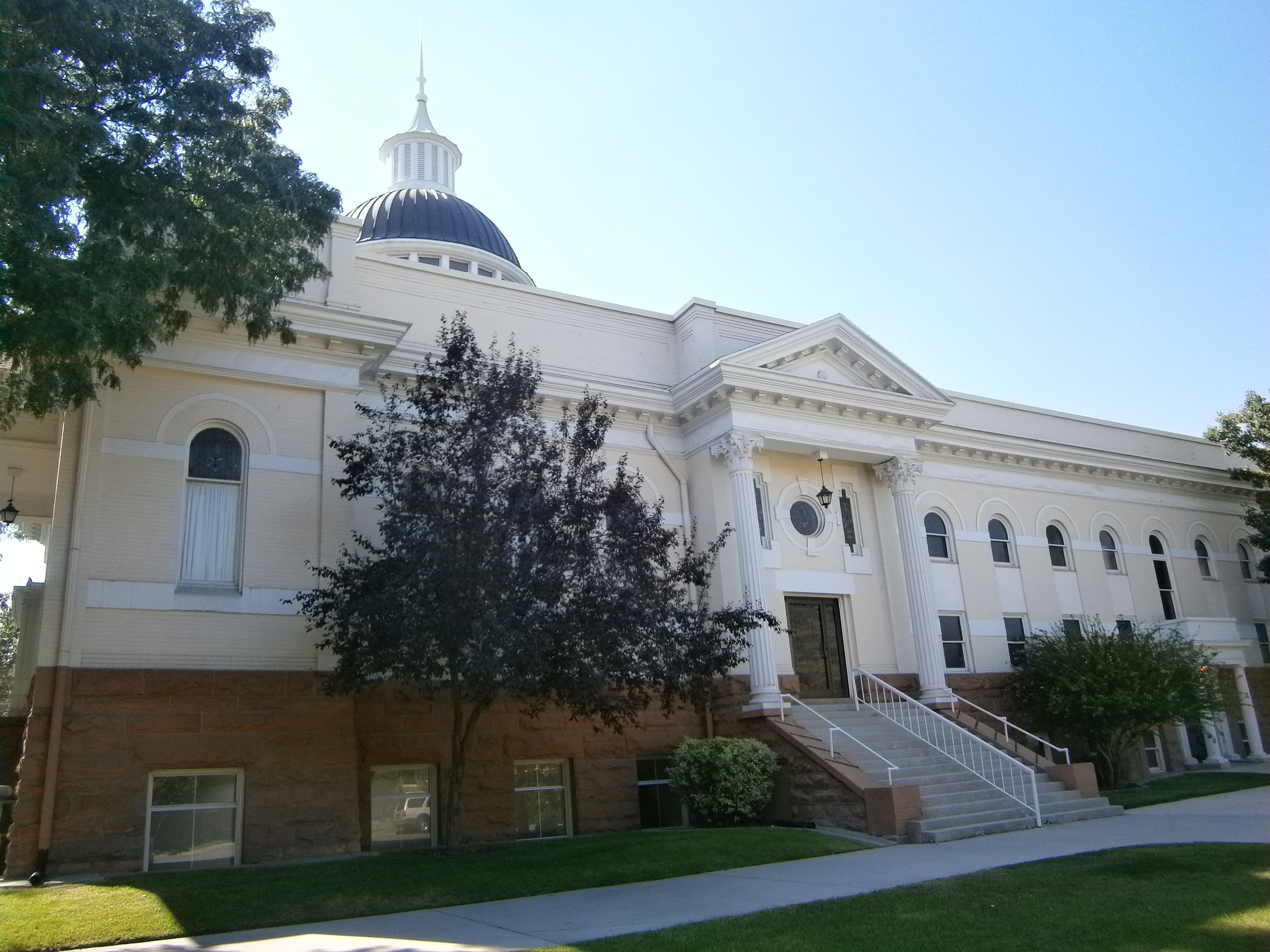
- The Forest Dale Ward Chapel, completed in 1903, is a contributing property in the district.

- Location within Utah Location within the United States
- Location: Roughly bounded by 700 E., I-80, Commonwealth Ave., and 900 E., Salt Lake City, Utah; United States
- Coordinates: 40°43′19.92″N 111°52′5.23″W
- Area: 58.8 acres (23.8 ha)
- Built: 1890
- Architect: Multiple
- Architectural style: Late Victorian, High Victorian Eclectic
- NRHP reference No.: 09000241
- Added to NRHP: April 23, 2009

The Forest Dale Historic District is located in the southeastern part of Salt Lake City, Utah and is roughly bounded by 700 East, Interstate 80, Commonwealth Avenue, and 900 East. It includes the "cohesive core" of the Forest Dale Subdivision platted in 1890, as well as the larger Town of Forest Dale, which was incorporated on January 6, 1902, disincorporated in the fall of 1912, and reabsorbed into the city of Salt Lake City. Both the subdivision and town were created by George Mousley Cannon (December 25, 1861–January 23, 1937), a member of the Cannon family, a prominent Intermountain West political family. The land for Forest Dale was originally Forest Farm, which Cannon had bought in 1889 from the estate of Brigham Young. Despite being bordered on 2 sides by major traffic corridors and on a third by a major arterial highway, the district "maintains its historic "inner-ring" suburban quality due to its tree-lined streets, uniform setbacks, and the similarity of scale in the housing stock." Forest Dale Golf Course is just southeast across I-80, and Fairmont Park is just to the east, separating Forest Dale from downtown Sugar House. The S Line (formerly known as Sugar House Streetcar) includes two stops near Forest Dale and Parley's Trail runs along the streetcar line. The streetcar and trail opened in late 2013 and early 2014, respectively.

On April 23, 2009, it was added to the National Register of Historic Places (NRHP). One of the most significant buildings in the district is the George M. Cannon House, which is listed separately on the NRHP.
