= Miles Park Romney =

Mormon pioneer (1843–1904)

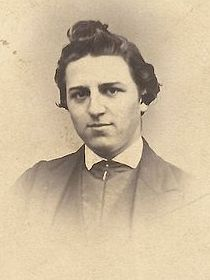
Miles Park Romney (putative), c. 1860s

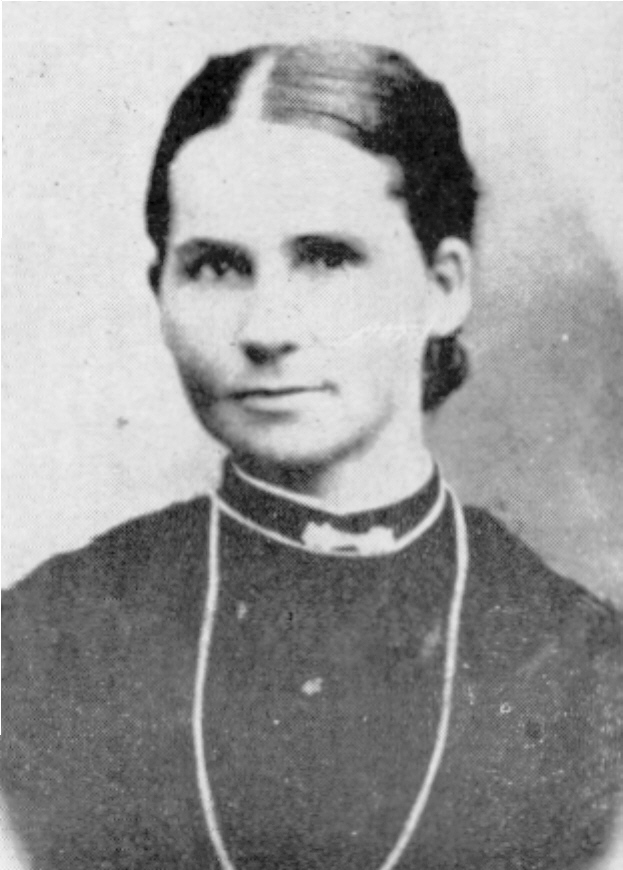
Catharine Jane Cottam married Romney as a plural wife in 1873. Her personal diaries, now published, comprise a significant record of her life and times.

Miles Park Romney (August 18, 1843 – February 26, 1904) was a prominent American builder in the Church of Jesus Christ of Latter-day Saints. He was born in Nauvoo, Illinois, the son of Miles Romney. He was the president of the St. George Social Hall Company and the St. George Dramatic Association, and also served as a chief of police, attorney-at-law, newspaper editor, and architect. One of his sons, Gaskell Romney, was the father of George W. Romney and grandfather of Mitt Romney.

Miles Park Romney moved to Utah with the body of the church while still a child. He became a builder like his father. After he married his first wife he was sent on a mission for the Church in England. After his return he followed the then teachings of the Church and married another wife.

Romney became prominent in the community, building Brigham Young's home. Miles Park Romney and his three wives and various children were then sent to settle St. Johns, Arizona, as part of the Church leadership's plan to settle a larger area. St. Johns was not particularly welcoming to the Mormon newcomers, with Romney, the editor of the local Mormon paper a particular target; Romney became entangled in a non-Mormon led effort to try David King Udall, another prominent Mormon and bishop, for fraud involving a homestead application and after various threats to hang the lot of them, the polygamous Romney family was told to try Mexico instead.

A polygamist, in the aftermath of the Edmunds Anti-Polygamy Act of 1882 (later amended by the Edmunds–Tucker Act, 1887), Romney, on April 7, 1885, joined a party leaving Arizona to find land outside the U.S., in the state of Chihuahua, Mexico, on which his family could settle, free from fear of his arrest. Romney died on February 26, 1904, in Colonia Dublan, Mexico.

Romney's five wives, in order of marriage, were Hannah Hood Hill (1862), Caroline "Carrie" Lambourne (1867), Catharine Jane Cottam (1873), Alice Marie "Annie" Woodbury (1877) and Emily "Millie" Henrietta Eyring Snow (1897). Romney married Hannah Hood Hill on May 10, 1862, at Salt Lake City, Utah.

== See also ==
- William J. Flake
- Romney family
- List of Latter Day Saint practitioners of plural marriage: Other notable members of The Church of Jesus Christ of Latter-day Saints
