= Helaman Pratt =

American Mormon leader

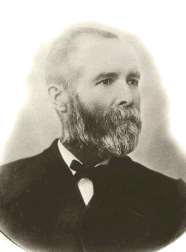
- Born: May 31, 1846; Near Mount Pisgah, Iowa, United States
- Died: November 26, 1909 (aged 63); Colonia Dublán, Nuevo Casas Grandes, Chihuahua, Mexico
- Known for: Mexican LDS Ministry
- Spouses: Emaline Billingsley (m. 1868) Anna Wilcken (m. 1874) Bertha Wilcken (m. 1898)
- Children: 21
- Parent(s): Parley P. Pratt; Mary Wood

Helaman Pratt (31 May 1846 – 26 November 1909) was an early leader of the Church of Jesus Christ of Latter-day Saints in the U.S. states of Nevada and Utah and later in Mexico.

== Family ==
Helaman was the son of Parley P. Pratt and Glasgow-born wife Mary Wood, the father of missionary Rey Pratt, the grandfather of Michigan governor George W. Romney, and the great-grandfather of Massachusetts governor Mitt Romney. He was born in a covered wagon during a one-hour stopover on the Mormon Trail near Mount Pisgah, Iowa.

Pratt first married Emeline Victoria Billingsly (1852–1910), in 1868. Next he married, as a plural wife, German-born Anna Johanna Dorothy ("Dora") Wilcken (Dahme, Zarpin, Rheinfeld, Ostholstein, Schleswig-Holstein, 25 July 1854 – Colonia Dublán, Galeana, Chihuahua, Mexico, 22 June 1929), in Salt Lake City, Utah, on 20 April 1874. In 1898, he married Bertha Christine Wilcken Stewart (1863–1947), Dora's younger sister.

Dora and Bertha were daughters of Carl Heinrich "Charles Henry" Wilcken (Eckhorst, Holstein, Schleswig-Holstein, 5 October 1831 – Salt Lake City, 9 April 1914) and Eliza Christina Carolina Reiche (Neustadt in Holstein, Ostholstein, Schleswig-Holstein, 1 May 1830 – Salt Lake City, 13 August 1906). Eliza was the first of Wilcken's four wives. Carl had first come to Utah as part of Johnston's Army but later joined the Church of Jesus Christ of Latter-day Saints.

== Church leader ==
In 1869, when the first LDS branch was organized in Overton, Nevada, Pratt served as branch president.

From 1872 to 1873, he was president of the Glenwood Branch in Glenwood, Utah. He then was the head of the group which founded Prattville, Utah.

== Missionary in Mexico ==
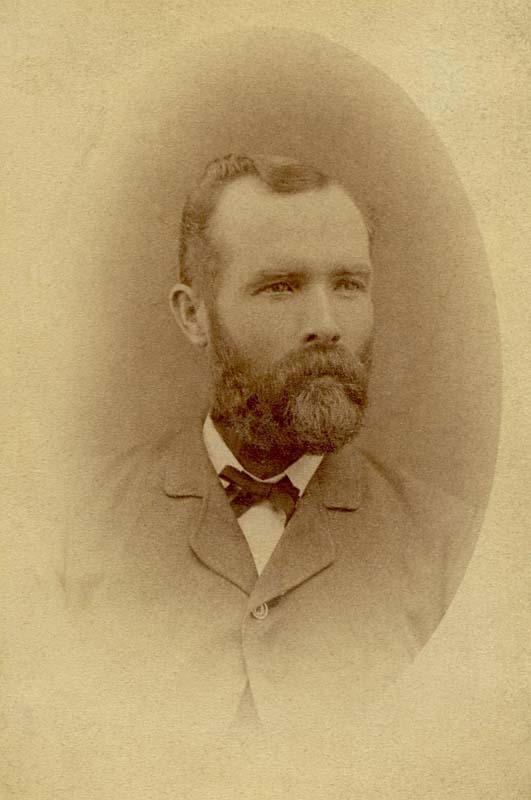
c. 1898

Pratt was one of the first missionaries to Mexico, and in 1876 at Hermosillo, Sonora, Pratt and Meliton Trejo performed the first baptisms recorded by the LDS Church in that country. Pratt was later president of the Mexican Mission based in Mexico City from 1884 to 1887. He succeeded Anthony W. Ivins in this position and was succeeded by Horace S. Cummings. After his release he moved to Colonia Dublán in Nuevo Casas Grandes, Chihuahua. He also for a time owned and resided at the Cliff Ranch outside Cave Valley, Chihuahua. In 1895, when the Juarez Stake was organized in Mexico, Pratt, along with Henry Eyring, was called to serve as one of President Ivins' counselors, a post he held until 1908 when the stake was reorganized with Pratt's son Junius as president.

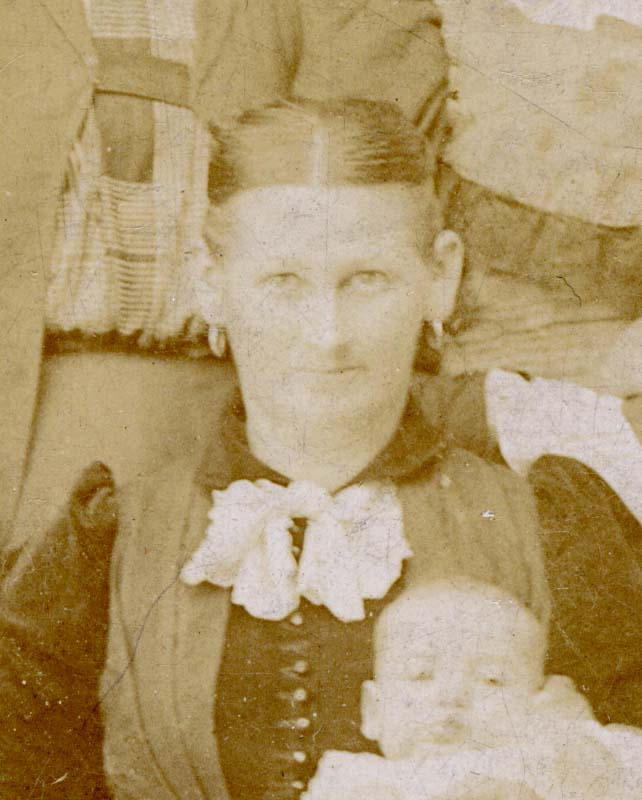
Anna Johanna Dorothy ("Dora") Wilcken (1854–1929), c. 1896

== See also ==
- Romney family
