= Jacob Hamblin House =

Historic house in Utah, United States

- U.S. National Register of Historic Places
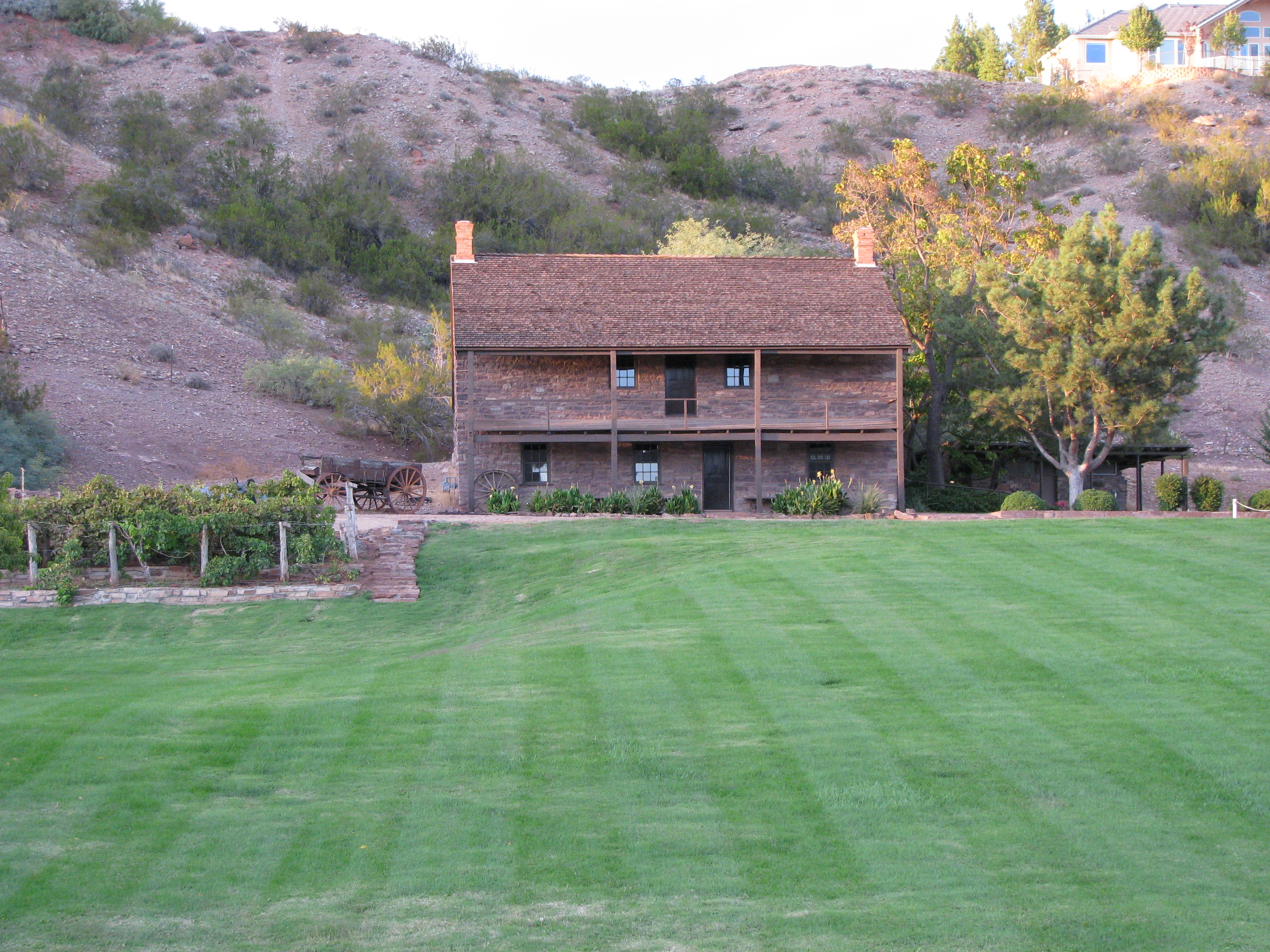

- Location within Utah Location within the United States
- Location: 3400 Hamblin Drive; Santa Clara, Utah; United States
- Coordinates: 37°8′0″N 113°39′36″W
- Built: 1863
- NRHP reference No.: 71000860
- Added to NRHP: March 11, 1971

The Jacob Hamblin House is a historic residence and museum located in Santa Clara, Utah. Jacob Hamblin was a Mormon pioneer and missionary who founded Santa Clara in 1854. The home was constructed for Hamblin by missionaries in 1863, following a flood that had destroyed the town, including Hamblin's original dwelling.

In 1959, the house was given to Utah State Parks and Recreation which restored the structure, opening it as a historic house museum. The Church of Jesus Christ of Latter-day Saints (LDS Church) acquired the property from the state in 1974, and has since operated the home, with its missionaries providing free guided tours.

== History ==
=== Hamblin's background ===
Jacob Hamblin was born in 1819 in Ohio. In February 1842, he met a group of preachers of the LDS Church; only days later, he officially joined the church. Church officials immediately recognized his leadership gifts and offered Hamblin the chance to join them in Nauvoo, Illinois. In 1844, a mob assassinated the church's leader, Joseph Smith, resulting in the succession crisis, in which several men claimed the right to lead the church. Hamblin supported Brigham Young as the President of the Church, and he later traveled west along the Mormon Trail to help the church establish new settlements away from persecution. Hamblin's first wife left him when he went west with the Saints. He married Rachel Judd in 1848 and, beginning in 1857, would take several plural wives.

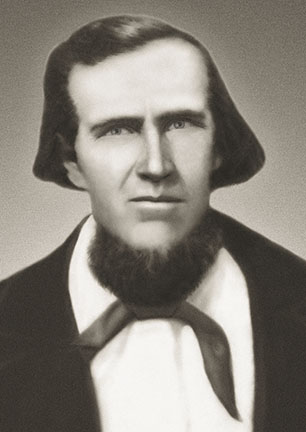
Jacob Hamblin, c. 1860

Hamblin first settled in Tooele, Utah Territory, where he befriended several local Native Americans. His amicable relations with the natives did not go unnoticed—Brigham Young commissioned Hamblin to serve a mission to the Paiutes (believed by the church members to be Lamanites). Hamblin moved to the southern reaches of the territory and founded the settlement of Santa Clara in 1854.

=== The house ===
In 1862, a flood inundated the entire settlement of Santa Clara and forced the residents to construct new homes. A group of missionaries were sent to the town in 1863 to provide housing and care for Hamblin's family. The new Jacob Hamblin home was completed later that year. Sandstone was quarried from hills near the home and was assembled by stone masons from Cedar City. The two-story residence was built on a hillside, allowing access to the second floor from atop the hill. A porch on each floor stretches across the front (south end) of the house. Identical rooms were constructed on opposite ends of the house, to accommodate Hamblin's two wives, each with a fireplace and staircase to the second floor. Hamblin's wife Rachel died in 1865, he then married Louisa Bonelli, a convert from Switzerland. Hamblin was then called to serve the Kanab region in 1871, and leased the house to a Mr. Bauman.

=== Later ownership ===
The home eventually became the property of the Samuel Knight family. In 1943, Dudley J. Hamblin (son of Jacob Hamblin), purchased the home from the Knights. In 1959, Clara Harmon (daughter of Dudley J. Hamblin), and other representatives of the Hamblin family, donated the home to Utah State Parks and Recreation. At the time, the home was in very poor condition and after extensive research and study, the state began a restoration of the structure. The newly restored home was dedicated and officially opened to the public in a ceremony on August 22, 1964. The dedication was held under the direction of State Senator Orval Hafen, and was part of a two-day, 500-person Hamblin family reunion. As property of the state, the home operated as a unit of Dixie State Park.

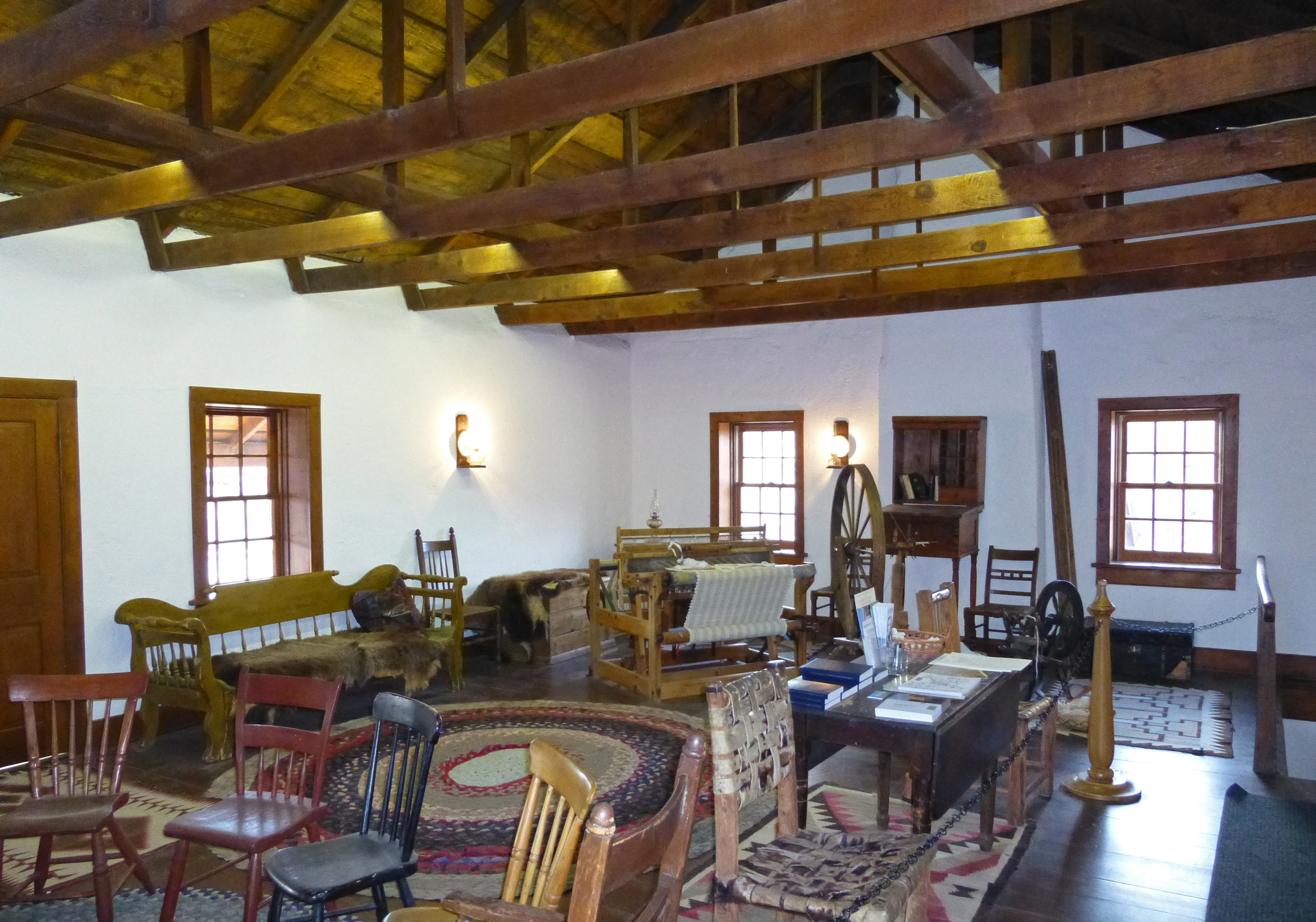
The restored second story of the home

In 1974, the LDS Church and Utah state government agreed to a property trade, in which the state would give the Jacob Hamblin House (and the nearby Brigham Young Winter Home and Office) to the church and in return it would give the state the historic Brigham Young Forest Farmhouse in Salt Lake City. The church would then operate the two southern Utah homes as historic site visitors' centers and the state would move the Forest Farmhouse to Pioneer Trail State Park (currently This Is the Place Heritage Park) where it would be a feature of Old Deseret Village. The Jacob Hamblin House first opened, under church control, in April 1975, but closed that August for additional restoration work and repairs. After refurbishment, the home was dedicated by church leader L. Tom Perry on May 29, 1976.

== See also ==
- National Register of Historic Places listings in Washington County, Utah

== Bibliography ==
- National Register of Historic Places Registration Form: Jacob Hamblin House
- Haymond, Jay M. (1994), "Hamblin, Jacob", in Powell, Allen Kent (ed.), Utah History Encyclopedia, Salt Lake City: University of Utah Press, ISBN 0874804256, OCLC 30473917, archived from the original on February 10, 2013
