= Prattsville =

Prattsville may refer to:

- Prattsville, New York, a town in Greene County
  - Prattsville (CDP), New York, a hamlet in the town
- Prattsville, Arkansas, a town in Grant County

== See also ==
- Prattville (disambiguation)
