= Brigham Young Winter Home and Office =

Historic house in Utah, United States

- U.S. National Register of Historic Places
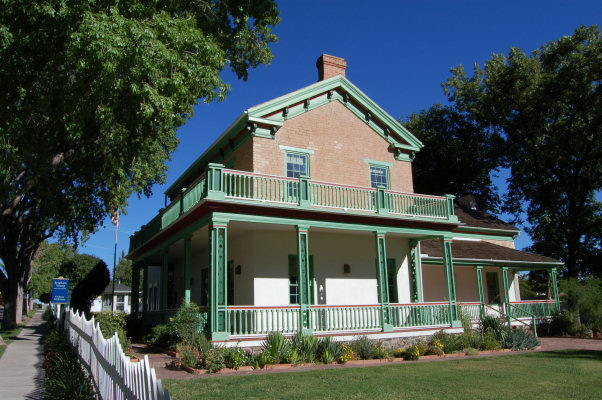

- Location within Utah Location within the United States
- Location: Southeast corner of 200 North and 100 West; St. George, Utah; United States
- Coordinates: 37°6′41″N 113°35′6″W
- Built: circa 1869 to 1873
- Architect: Miles Romney and Miles Park Romney
- Restored: 1962 to 1963, 1975 to 1976, 2002 to 2003
- Restored by: State of Utah, The Church of Jesus Christ of Latter-day Saints
- Website: Brigham Young Winter Home and Office
- NRHP reference No.: 71000863
- Added to NRHP: February 22, 1971

The Brigham Young Winter Home and Office is a historic house museum located in St. George, Utah. The home and office once belonged to Brigham Young, the foremost Mormon pioneer and second president of the Church of Jesus Christ of Latter-day Saints (LDS Church). During Young's later years, his arthritis precluded him from spending winters in the Salt Lake City region, so a winter home in St. George—located in the arid Dixie region of the state—was acquired. He seasonally occupied the property from 1873 to 1877.

After Young's death, the home remained a private residence and was eventually purchased by St. George's first dentist, Jedediah M. Gates. The Young Family Association acquired the house in 1955, and four years later, it became the property of Utah State Parks and Recreation. The state restored the home, opening it to the public in 1963. The LDS Church acquired the property from the state in 1974, and has since operated the house museum, with its missionaries providing free guided tours.

== History ==
=== Young's background ===
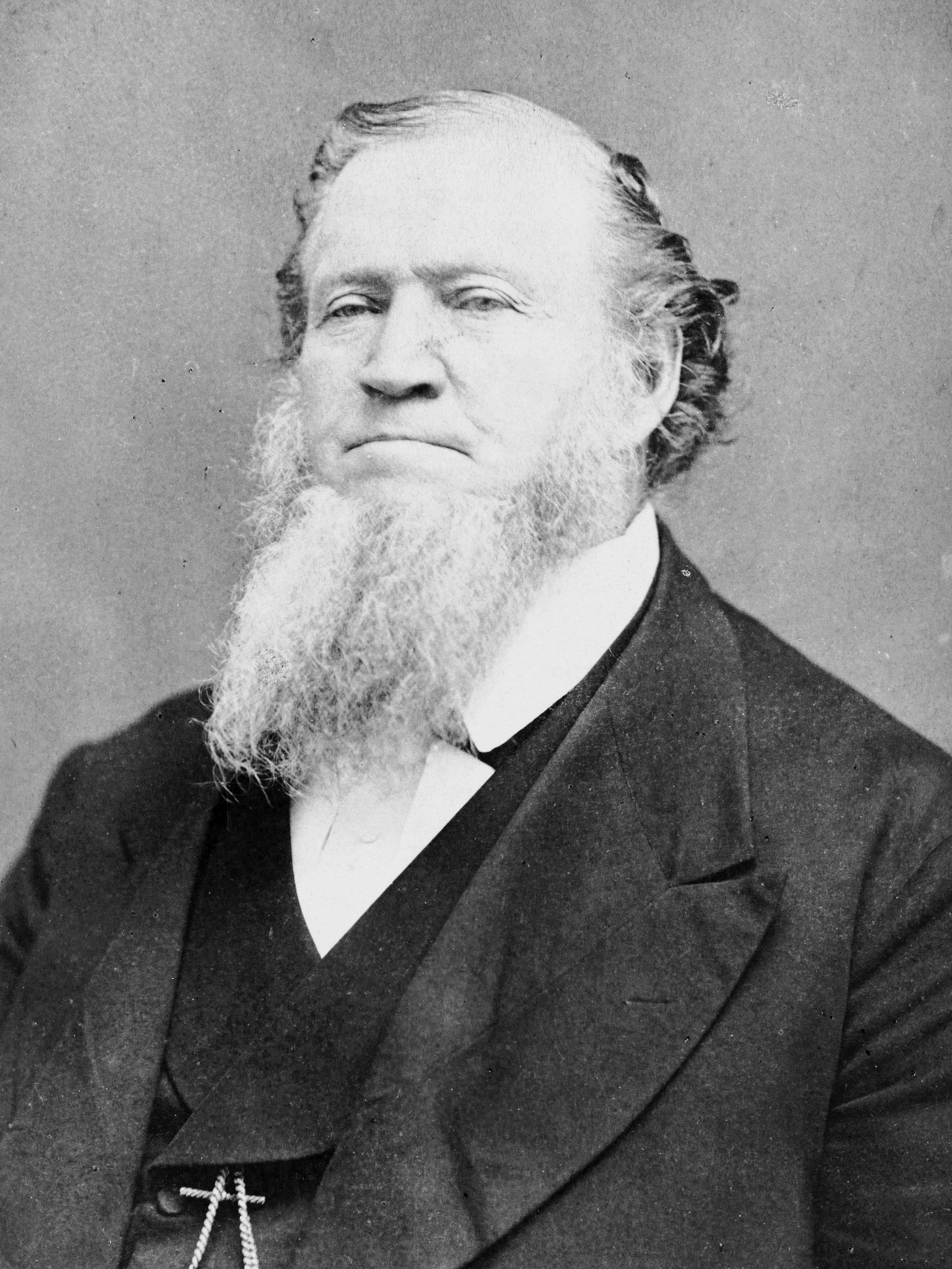
Brigham Young in 1870, three years before he started to use his winter home.

Brigham Young was a tradesman from Vermont who converted to the LDS Church in 1830. Joseph Smith, founder of the church, named Young to the first Quorum of the Twelve Apostles and then, in 1839, appointed him quorum president, a high-level position in church leadership. In 1844, a mob killed Smith, resulting in the succession crisis, in which several men claimed the right to lead the church.

In early 1846, those Latter-day Saints who chose to follow Young left their homes in Navuoo, Illinois and headed west to establish a new settlement, away from persecution. Young and a band of followers arrived in the Salt Lake Valley in July 1847, where they established Salt Lake City. In the subsequent years, Young assigned groups of Latter-day Saints to establish communities throughout Utah and surrounding areas, convert the natives, and provide infrastructure. St. George was one of these commissioned settlements. Intended to be a cotton-growing colony, the region was noted for its warm temperatures, even in winter.

=== The house ===
As Young aged, he found that warm weather helped his arthritis. In the early 1870s, he purchased a home in St. George which had recently been constructed by the Chesney family. After the purchase, a large two-story addition to the home was built, more than doubling the structure's size, and an adjacent office building was constructed.

The home was designed by Miles Romney and its addition was designed by his son, Miles Park Romney. The house has two stories and is constructed of beige adobe brick. The red sandstone basement has two rooms, and the roof gable has wood shingles. Inside, the house has four fireplaces, three made of red sandstone and one from adobe. Inside the home, the church has included a selection of Young's extant furniture, some of which was built by him, and added other period pieces. Wood for the house was cut from the Mount Trumbull Wilderness and the Pine Valley Mountain Wilderness. The office is east of the living quarters, and features stucco walls and a sandstone chimney.

Young first moved into the home in December 1873. His presence in the community motivated the locals to complete the St. George Temple, which was dedicated in 1877.

The home was first recognized with a historic plaque added in 1947, by the Daughters of Utah Pioneers. It was also added to the National Register of Historic Places in 1971.

=== Ownership after Young ===
Young died on August 29, 1877, and his family eventually sold the home to St. George's first dentist, Jedediah M. Gates. After Gates died in 1947, his children put the property up for sale. The Brigham Young Family Association, under the direction of Gordon Claridge Young (a great-grandson of Brigham Young), agreed to purchase the home in 1955. The family association, along with the Sons of Utah Pioneers, planned to restore and open the property for tours. Although doing so proved to be too financially difficult for the family.

In 1959, the state purchased the association's equity in the home and paid off the remainder owed to the Gates family, securing title to the property. The state restored the home beginning in 1962, which included moving the front door and a stairway back to their original positions. The restoration was overseen by architect George Cannon Young, a grandson of Brigham Young. The restored home and office were dedicated on June 14, 1963, becoming a unit of Dixie State Park (currently Snow Canyon State Park). Participants in the dedicatory services included State Senator Orval Hafen, and LDS Church leaders Hugh B. Brown and Marion G. Romney.

In 1974, the LDS Church and Utah state government agreed to a property trade, in which the state would give Young's Winter Home and Office (and the nearby Jacob Hamblin House) to the church and in return the church would give the state the historic Brigham Young Forest Farmhouse in Salt Lake City. The church would then operate the two southern Utah homes as historic site visitors' centers and the state would move the Forest Farmhouse to Pioneer Trail State Park (currently This Is the Place Heritage Park) where it would be a feature of Old Deseret Village. Young's Winter Home and Office first opened, under church control, in April 1975, but closed that August for additional restoration work and repairs. After refurbishment, both Young's home and Hamblin's home were dedicated by church leader L. Tom Perry on May 29, 1976.

On May 31, 2003, the home was reopened following a months-long project to renovate the structure. This project included reinforcing the walls and roof, to make the building better able to survive earthquakes. The home's exterior woodwork was also painted moss green, its original color. Many historic buildings in St. George were originally painted this shade of green due to the wrong paint color being sent for the St. George Temple, and the early settlers made use of the mistake.

== See also ==
- Brigham Young Complex:
  - Beehive House
  - Lion House
- Gardo House
- National Register of Historic Places in Washington County, Utah

== Bibliography ==
- Dykman, Judy; Whitley, Colleen; Robinson, Kari K. (2002). "Beyond Salt Lake City". In Whitley, Colleen (ed.). Brigham Young's Homes. Logan, Utah: Utah State University Press. ISBN 0-87421-442-4.
