= Romney =

Romney may refer to:

Romney (surname), including a list of people with the name

- Romney family, a family prominent in U.S. politics
  - George W. Romney (1907–1995), former CEO of American Motors, Governor of Michigan, and U.S. Secretary of Housing and Urban Development
  - Mitt Romney (born 1947), Republican politician, U.S. Senator for Utah, and former Governor of Massachusetts, and businessman

== Places ==
=== Canada ===
- Romney Township, Ontario, a township in Kent County, Ontario

=== United Kingdom ===
- Romney Deanery, a Deanery of the Canterbury Diocese, in Kent, England
- Romney Island, an island in the English River Thames
- Romney Marsh, a wetland in Kent and East Sussex, England
- Romney Road, a road in England near the River Thames
- New Romney, a town in Kent
- Old Romney, a nearby Kentish village of similar age to New Romney

=== United States ===
- Romney, Indiana, an unincorporated community
- Romney, Pennsylvania, an unincorporated community
- Romney, Texas, an unincorporated community
- Romney, West Virginia, (population, 1,940), the oldest town in West Virginia

== Buildings and structures ==
- Romney's House, a Grade I listed house in Hampstead, London, built by the artist George Romney
- Romney hut, a type of British pre-fabricated building
- George W. Romney Building or the Romney Building, the Governor of Michigan's main office location
- Romney African-American Cemetery, an old cemetery in Romney, West Virginia
- Romney Lock, a lock on the English River Thames
- Romney Stadium, an outdoor football stadium at Utah State University

== Companies and organizations ==
- Romney's, an English baking company, founded 1918
- Romney, Hythe and Dymchurch Railway, a heritage railway in Kent, England
- Romney Academy, a 19th-century educational institution in Romney, West Virginia
- Romney Middle School, a school in Romney, West Virginia
- Sir William Romney's School, Tetbury, a secondary school

== Military ==
- Romney Expedition, an early maneuver of the Confederate Army in the US Civil War

=== Naval warships ===
- HMS Romney, a British Royal Navy ship name
- HMS Romney (1694), a 50-gun English naval warship
- HMS Romney (1708), a 50-gun English naval warship
- HMS Romney (1762), a 50-gun English naval warship

== Other uses ==
- Romney (sheep), a breed of sheep bred for meat
- Earl of Romney, an English title
- Romney Formation, a stratum of sedimentary rock

== See also ==
- Massachusetts health care reform, a 2006 health-care reform bill in Massachusetts commonly known as Romneycare
- New Romney, Kent, England
  - New Romney (UK Parliament constituency), the Parliament seat for New Romney
  - New Romney railway station, a depot in Kent, England
- Romney Sands railway station, a depot in Kent, England
- Romny, a city in Ukraine
- Shuzenji Romney Railway, a railway on the Izu Peninsula of Japan
