= Prattville, Utah =

Defunct settlement

Coordinates: 38.7742°N 112.0139°W

Prattville was a location in Sevier County, Utah, United States, settled under the leadership of Helaman Pratt in 1873. Pratt served as the first branch president at this location. The settlement was largely abandoned in 1878, and the LDS branch was dissolved that year.

== Notable person ==
- Art Acord, (1890-1931), rodeo champion, silent movie star called the "Mormon cowboy", Hollywood Walk of Fame honoree, born on the family ranch in the area.

== See also ==
- List of ghost towns in Utah

== Sources ==
- Jenson, Andrew. Encyclopedic History of the Church. Salt Lake City: Deseret Book Company, 1937.
