= Brigham Young Forest Farmhouse =

Historic home in Salt Lake City, Utah, United States

- Formerly listed on the U.S. National Register of Historic Places
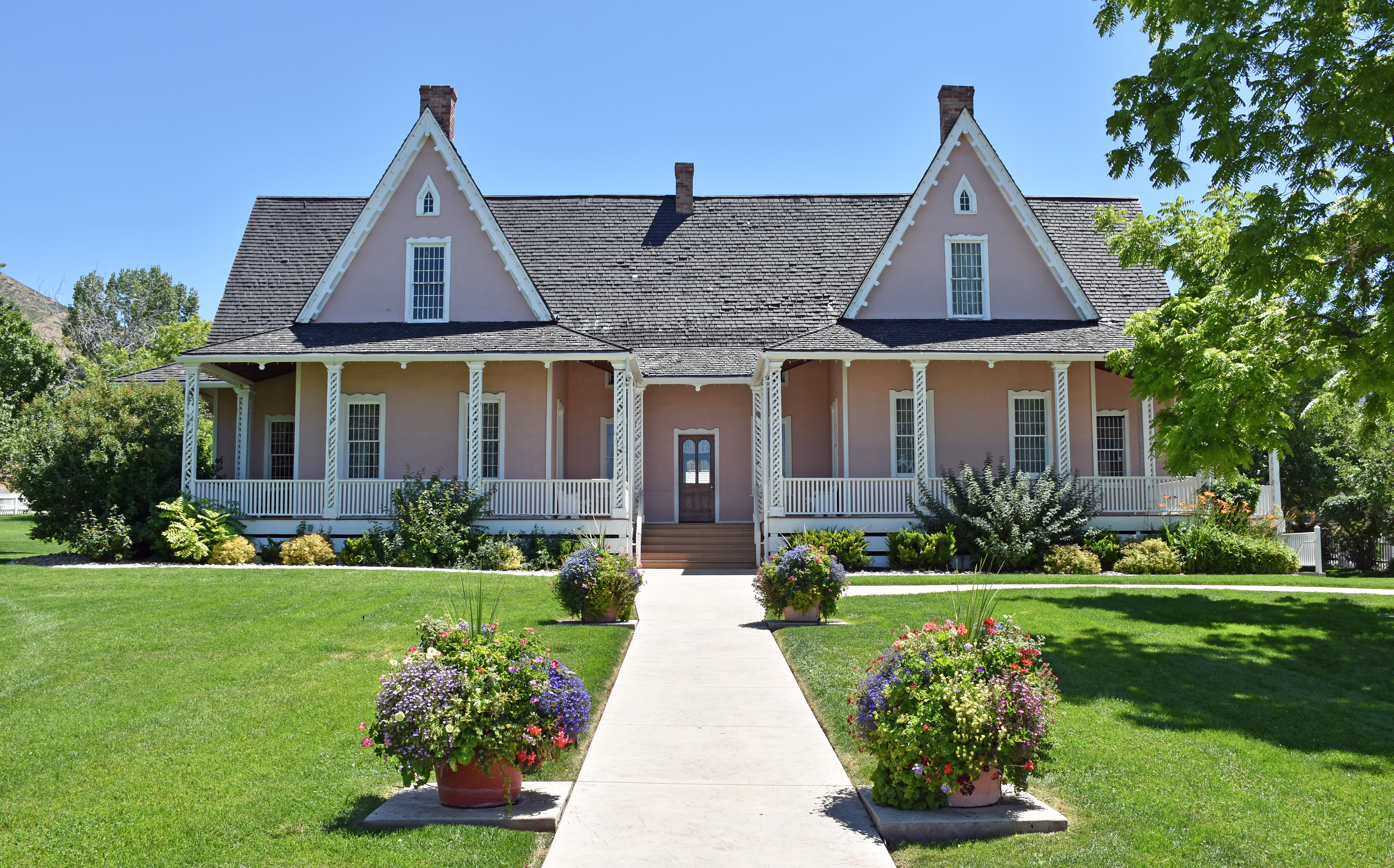
- The Forest Farmhouse at This Is the Place Heritage Park
- Location: This Is the Place Heritage Park, Salt Lake City, Utah
- Coordinates: 40°45′12.23″N 111°49′14.15″W
- Built: 1861–1863
- Architect: Unknown
- Architectural style: Gothic Revival Cottage
- Restored: 1969–1970
- Restored by: The Church of Jesus Christ of Latter-day Saints
- NRHP reference No.: 71000852

Significant dates
- Added to NRHP: May 14, 1971
- Removed from NRHP: May 29, 1975

The Brigham Young Forest Farmhouse is a historic home in Salt Lake City, Utah. The building was once owned by Brigham Young, an early leader of the Church of Jesus Christ of Latter-day Saints (LDS Church) and first governor of Utah Territory. Built between 1861 and 1863, it was located on Young's Forest Farm near the southern boundary of Salt Lake City. Restored from 1969 to 1970, the home was listed on the National Register of Historic Places in 1971, and subsequently relocated to This Is the Place Heritage Park in 1975.

== Forest Farm ==
Brigham Young's Forest Farm was located approximately 4 miles (6.4 km) southeast of downtown Salt Lake City; today this area is known as Forest Dale. The farm was well known for its agricultural experiments, especially attempts to grow crops new to the area. It was the first location where alfalfa and sugar beets were grown in Salt Lake Valley. The local silk industry (overseen by Zina D. H. Young) was also moved to a cocoonery on the farm, where nearly 30 acres (12 ha) of mulberry trees were planted to provide food for the silkworms. For many years, the farm's primary produce came from its large dairy.

== Farmhouse ==
Dwellings on the farm were adobe or log cabins until construction of the farmhouse began in 1861 and was completed in 1863. The home was constructed with a rock foundation and wood frame walls, covered with stucco. It was built using the balloon framing technique, likely the first such structure in Utah. The floor plan is a double cross-wing and its style is Gothic Revival Cottage. Its original cost was $25,000 (equivalent to $653,716 in 2025). The front door opened to the dining room and on either side were the kitchen, social room, and sitting room; the second floor contained the bedrooms.

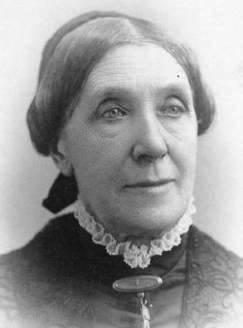
Susannah Snively Young, who lived at the farm longer than any other of Young's wives

Brigham Young did not regularly live in the Forest Farmhouse, and one of his 56 wives (the "wife in residence") would supervise the farm. Young's wife Ann Eliza Young later complained that the home was inadequate against the winter cold and summer heat, and that Young only sent disliked wives to Forest Farm, where they were heavily worked. Susannah Snively Young lived at the farm longer than any other of Young's wives; she was particularly skilled with the dairy work. Young would commonly bring guests to stay at the Farmhouse, including actress Julia Dean Hayne.

=== After Young's death ===
Young died in 1877 and the farmhouse remained in his family until 1889, when it was sold to George Mousley Cannon. Cannon divided up the farm land into building lots, creating what is today Forest Dale. After Young's death and as the new neighborhood grew, the farmhouse was used as a schoolhouse, ward meetinghouse, and community gathering place.

In 1923, the home was heavily remodeled, including removing the porches and southern portion of the building, to create a "modern" house. What remained of the home was purchased by Frank and Gwen Wilcox in the 1950s, and after learning it had once belonged to Brigham Young, they started to restore what had survived. In 1968, the Wilcoxes donated the equity in the house to the LDS Church, which then owned the building after paying off the remaining mortgage. The Wilcoxes, together with the church (and its curator Florence S. Jacobsen), restored the farmhouse, including rebuilding the demolished portion of the home. On April 2, 1970, Spencer W. Kimball, the LDS Church's Acting President of the Quorum of the Twelve Apostles, dedicated the home as a historic site visitors' center of the church. The restored home was listed on the National Register of Historic Places on May 14, 1971.

=== Relocation ===
In 1974, the LDS Church and Utah state government agreed to a property trade, in which the church would give the Forest Farmhouse to the state and in return the state would give the church two historic sites it owned in southern Utah (the Brigham Young Winter Home and Office and Jacob Hamblin House). The church would then operate the two southern Utah homes as historic site visitors' centers and the state would move the Forest Farmhouse to Pioneer Trail State Park (currently This Is the Place Heritage Park) where it would be a feature of Old Deseret Village.

In order to move the house from its original location, the building was sawed in half horizontally, where the gables reached the walls. On Monday, May 12, 1975, the top half of the home was lifted off and placed on a large moving carriage. The following day this half was moved to the park, and on Wednesday the bottom half of the home followed. The two pieces were then joined at their new location on Saturday, May 17. During the move, original pieces of stucco were discovered, which appeared to be deep red and scored to look like brick. Because of the move, the walls had to be redone and craftsmen were brought in to complete the work. At the park, the farmhouse was placed away from the rest of the recreated village and is surrounded by farmland, to reflect the home's original location outside of Salt Lake City proper. The relocated house first reopened for tours on July 24, 1976 (Pioneer Day in Utah).

The home was delisted from the National Register of Historic Places on May 29, 1975, due to it being removed from its historical location, which had provided important context to the structure.

== See also ==
- Brigham Young Complex:
  - Beehive House
  - Lion House
- Brigham Young Winter Home and Office
- Gardo House
- National Register of Historic Places listings in Salt Lake City

== Bibliography ==
- Hyde, Elinor G. (2002). "The Brigham Young Farm House". In Whitley, Colleen (ed.). Brigham Young's Homes. Logan, Utah: Utah State University Press. ISBN 0-87421-442-4.
