= Mount Pisgah, Iowa =

Mount Pisgah
- Mormon semi-permanent settlement
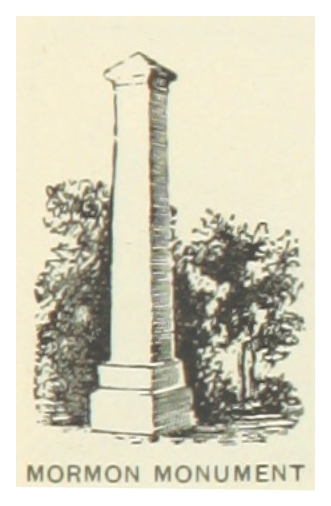
- 1891 illustration of a monument at the Mount Pisgah Cemetery State Preserve

- Location within Iowa
- Coordinates: 41°2′18.91″N 94°6′46.9″W

Mount Pisgah was a semi-permanent settlement or way station from 1846 to 1852 along the Mormon Trail between Garden Grove and Council Bluffs, in the U.S. state of Iowa. It is located near the small community of Thayer in Jones Township, Union County. This site is part of the Mormon Pioneer National Historic Trail and the birthplace of church leader Helaman Pratt. The address of the memorial is 1704 Mount Pisgah Road in Thayer.

After the 1844 death of Joseph Smith, the founder of the Latter Day Saint movement, most members of the Church aligned themselves with Brigham Young and the Church of Jesus Christ of Latter-day Saints (LDS). Under Young's leadership, about 13,000 Mormon citizens of Nauvoo, Illinois set out to find a new home in the West. On May 18, 1846, Nauvoo exiles established a permanent camp and resting place on the middle fork (Twelve-Mile Creek) of the Grand River on Potawatomi Indian land. The site was selected and named Mount Pisgah by LDS apostle Parley P. Pratt, who, when he first saw the modest hill, was reminded of the biblical Pisgah (Deuteronomy 3:27) where Moses viewed the Promised Land.

Pratt's brother, Orson, wrote: "We concluded to form another settlement here, for the benefit of the poor, and such as were unable, for the want of teams, to proceed further. Accordingly, the camp commenced building houses, ploughing, planting, and fencing in farms, an immense quantity of labor was performed in a very few days." To the west of the rise, they built cabins and planted several thousand acres with peas, cucumbers, beans, corn, buckwheat, potatoes, pumpkins, and squash.

LDS emigrants considered the area rich in agricultural promise, although food was very scarce during the early years and illness was common. At its height, the community had over 2,000 inhabitants, but generally averaged about 700 Latter-day Saints. It was there that the U.S. Army first called upon the Latter-day Saints to furnish volunteers to serve in the Mexican–American War. This military group became known as the Mormon Battalion. The LDS settlers maintained a vital settlement until 1852. As the need to supply and support Mormon pioneer companies waned in the region, Mount Pisgah's residents sold their land and improvements to other American frontiersmen and moved on to Latter-day Saint settlements in Utah and surrounding areas.

The site of Mount Pisgah is marked by a nine-acre (3.6 ha) Mount Pisgah Cemetery State Preserve, which contains exhibits, historical markers, and a reconstructed log cabin. However, little remains from the 19th century except a cemetery memorializing the 300 to 800 emigrants who died while passing through or residing in the community.
