= Miles Romney =

American architect

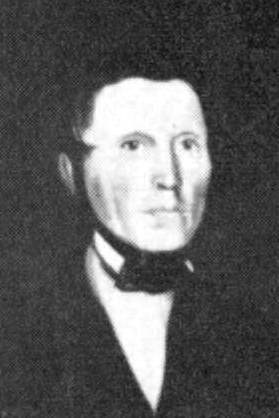
Miles Romney

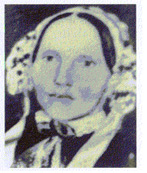
Elizabeth Gaskell Romney (1809–1884)

Miles Romney (July 13, 1806 – May 3, 1877) was a British convert to Mormonism, Mormon pioneer and early settler of the American west, including St. George, Utah. In 1837, Romney and his wife, Elizabeth, joined the Church of the Latter Day Saints in a baptism ceremony just south of Preston, Lancashire, England. Soon after, they emigrated to the United States to join with the Church of Jesus Christ of Latter Day Saints in Nauvoo, Illinois.

== Early life ==
Romney was born in Dalton-in-Furness, Lancashire in 1806. He was the son of George Romney, Jr. (whose father, George Romney, Sr., was first cousin to the English portrait artist also named George Romney) and Sarah King. On November 16, 1830, he married Elizabeth Gaskell. The couple eventually had nine children, including Miles Park Romney, and moved to the Preston area where they may have been practising members of the Church of England congregation at St Mary's parish church in Penwortham.

Romney worked as a carpenter in the area, also working in nearby Preston. Seven years after the founding of Church of Christ (renamed the Church of Jesus Christ of Latter Day Saints in 1838), in 1837 seven missionaries were sent to Northwest England, and started preaching in Preston. Romney and his wife were early converts, baptized in the River Ribble at Preston. They later emigrated to join other members of the Church in Nauvoo, Illinois.

== United States ==
Once in the United States, Romney worked as an architect, designing or assisting in building early temples, tabernacles and other buildings important to the Church of Jesus Christ of Latter-day Saints (LDS Church). Romney worked in both Nauvoo and westward in Utah, and assisted in building the Nauvoo Temple.

After coming to Utah, Romney went with a group of pioneers to settle St. George, Utah. There he served as superintendent of construction for the St. George Utah Temple, the first LDS temple completed in the state of Utah. As an architect, Romney designed the St. George Tabernacle and Brigham Young Winter Home and Office, the latter with his son, Miles Park Romney. Both are listed on the U.S. National Register of Historic Places. Miles Romney supervised the construction of the St. George Temple and Tabernacle.

Romney died in St. George, Utah, on May 3, 1877, from complications suffered from a fall while working on the St. George Temple.

Romney is an ancestor of politicians George W. Romney and Mitt Romney.

== See also ==
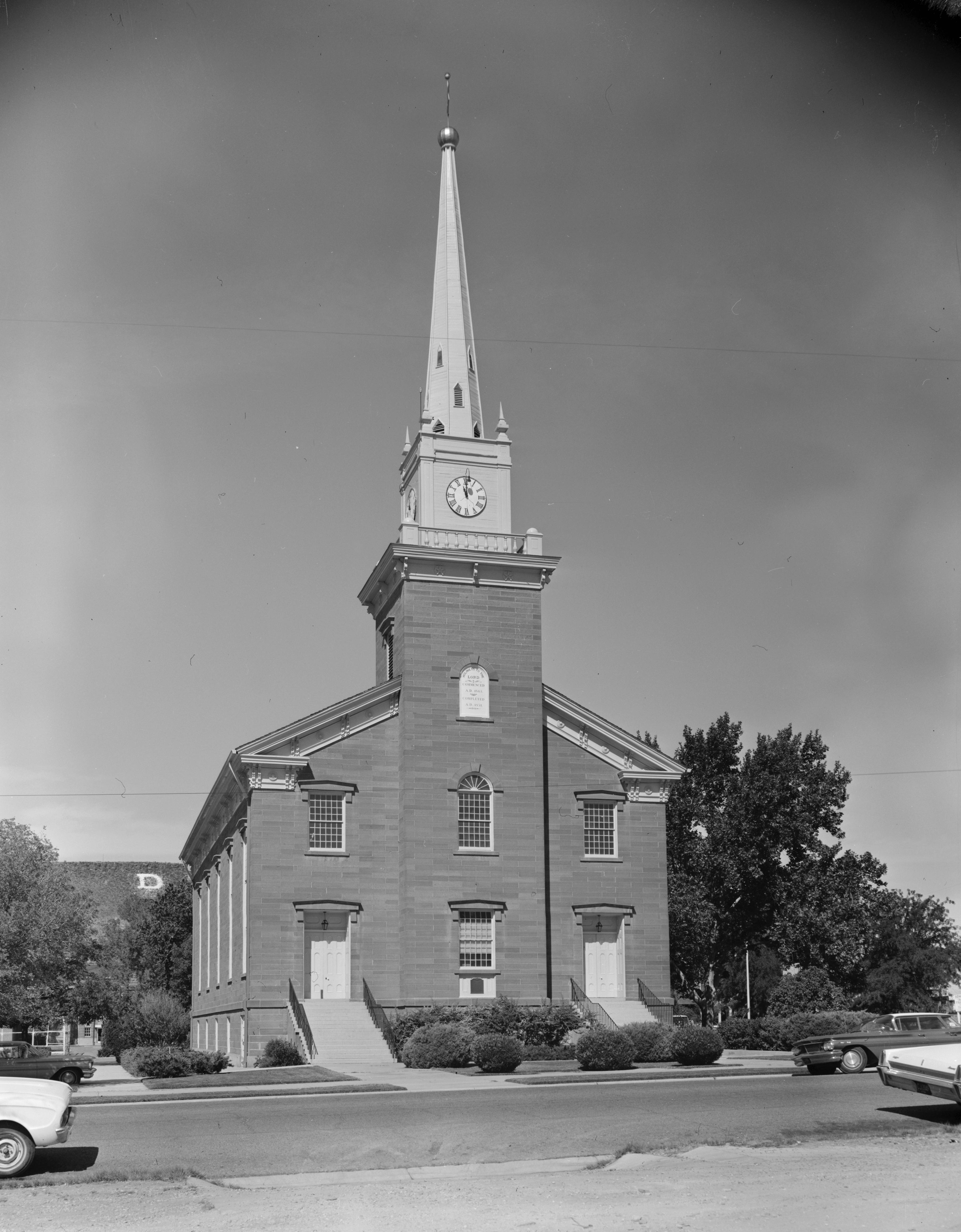
St. George Tabernacle, designed by Romney, was completed in 1876

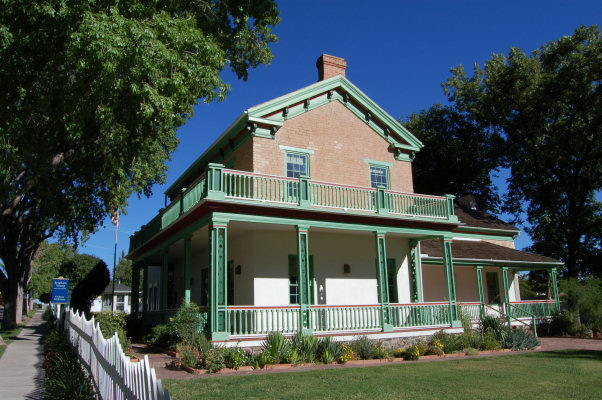
Brigham Young's winter home in St. George, Utah, completed in 1871

- Romney-Pratt family
