= Utah Condominium Act of 1960 =

Law allowing individuals to own property in condos in Utah, US

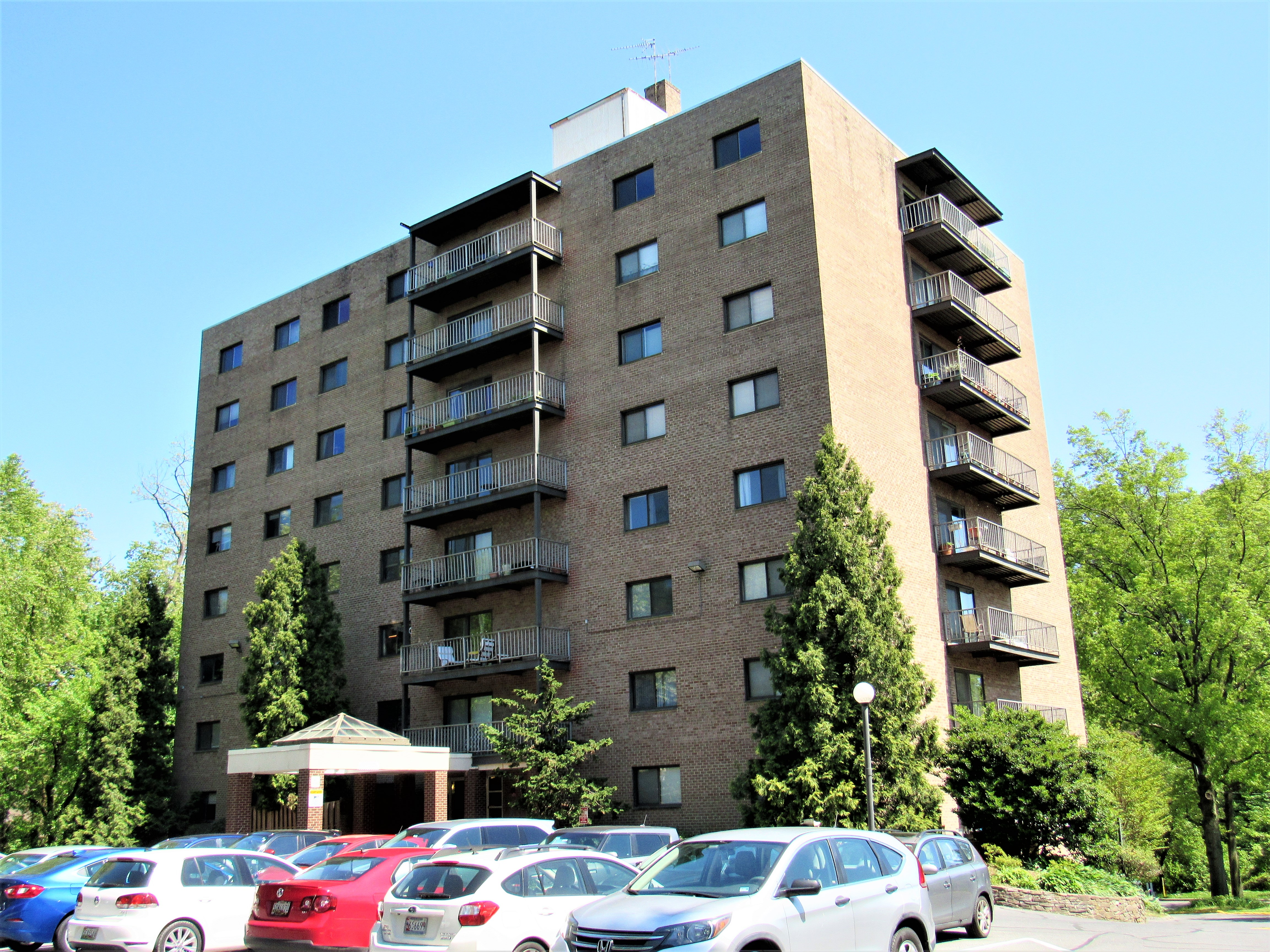
Condominium building

Utah Code Title 57 Chapter 8 is the Condominium Ownership Act authored by Keith Romney and passed into law in 1960.

The Act allowed individuals to have private ownership of property in a collective unit. Although authored in 1960, the Act wasn't officially adopted until 1963. Helping the Act pass into law was an amendment made to section 234 of the National Housing Act. This amendment made it possible for the Federal Housing Administration to insure mortgages for condominiums.
