= St. George Opera House =

- St. George Social Hall
- U.S. National Register of Historic Places
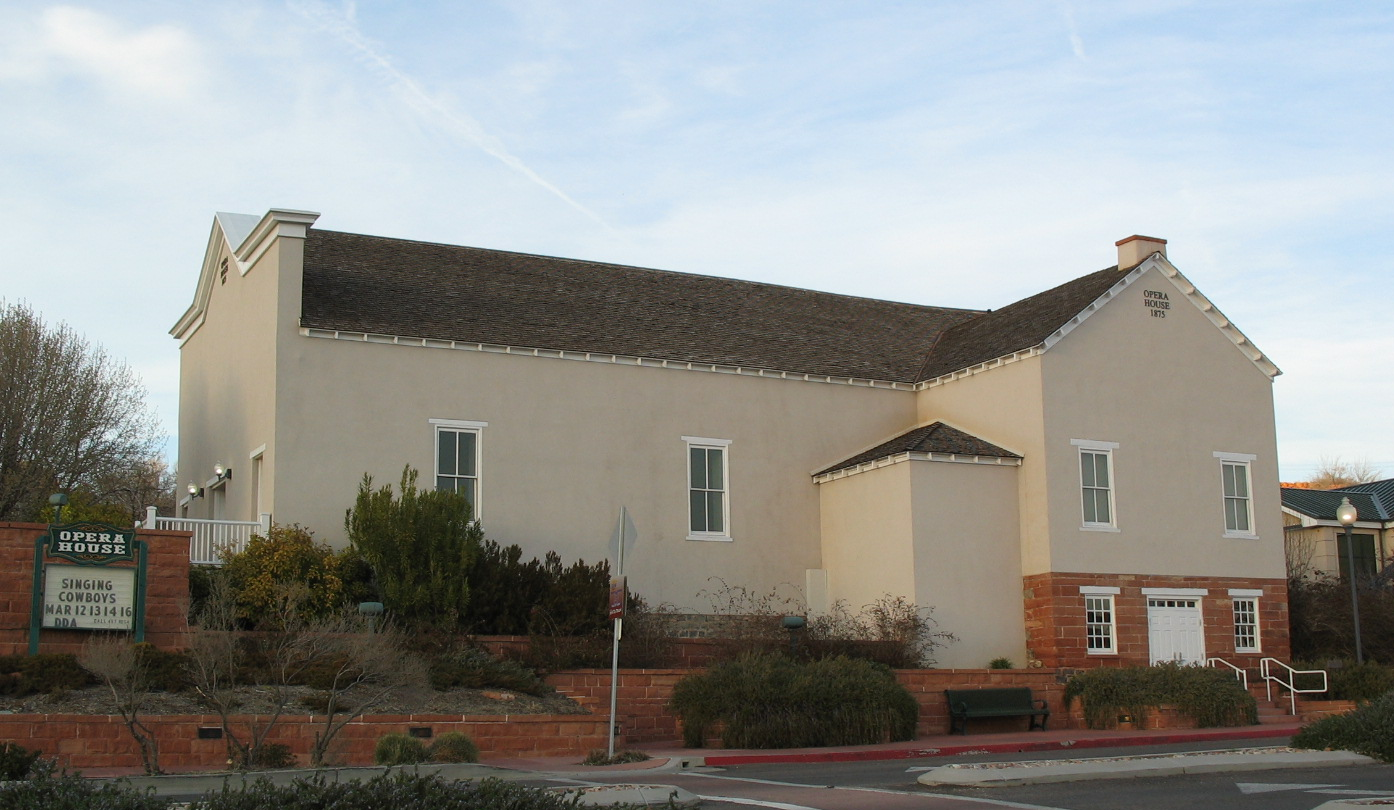
- Opera House

- Location within Utah Location within the United States
- Location: 212 N. Main St., St. George, Utah
- Coordinates: 37°6′42.6″N 113°34′58.7″W
- Built: 1864
- NRHP reference No.: 91000360
- Added to NRHP: April 3, 1991

The St. George Opera House, also known as the St. George Social Hall, is a historic building in St. George, Utah. It was originally built by the St. George Gardeners' Club as a wine cellar. As wine demand decreased, the building was expanded to host theatrical productions. It operated in this capacity until sold to the Utah-Idaho Sugar Company in 1936. It was restored to an opera house in 1988 and is again open to the public.

== History ==
In 1861, Brigham Young sent three hundred Mormon families to the south reaches of Utah Territory to establish a new settlement. Young envisioned a Mormon state that was completely self-sufficient, and one important goal in this regard was the production of cotton. The region settled was much warmer than the northern Salt Lake City, and it was thought that this would be good weather for cotton. Unfortunately for the settlers, this was not the case. The climate was too hot during the summer, producing only small harvests of cotton.

The original function of the St. George Opera House was a wine cellar. Grape production was an important secondary source of income for the settlers. The St. George Gardeners' Club formed in the mid-1860s to provide community support for farmers. In 1864, as one of their first projects, they built the cellar as a cool place to store surplus wine and to process grapes. It was mostly constructed below-ground along a hillside.

As wine demand diminished due to closing mines and pressure from the church, new plans were made for the cellar building. The Gardener's Club sold it to the Social Hall Company in the late 1870s. Extensions were added on the top and to the west of the main cellar to create a stage and seating for up to four hundred patrons. The performing arts were an important part of Mormon culture, and Young always ensured that artisans were among the families sent when organizing new settlements. Miles P. Romney was president of the Social Hall Company and the St. George Dramatic Association, occasionally performing in some of the plays. Shortly after it opened, Mormon missionaries shipped materials from a bankrupt opera house in New York City to the St. George Social Hall. The hall hosted its first opera 1886.

The hall was deeded to the local LDS church in 1900, as it was hopelessly in debt to it. However, the church continued to run productions in it. The Great Depression forced the church to sell the property to the Utah-Idaho Sugar Company in 1936. They used the building to process sugar beet seeds, an important source of income for the Church of Jesus Christ of Latter-day Saints. They sold the property to the St. George Neighborhood Redevelopment Agency in 1988, who restored the building to again function as an opera house.
