= Matheson family =

Matheson
- Origin: Utah
- Members: Scott Milne Matheson, Sr., Scott M. Matheson, Scott Matheson, Jr., Jim Matheson
- Distinctions: Political family

Matheson is the name of a U.S. political family in Utah, United States.

== Members ==
- Scott Milne Matheson, Sr. (1897–1958), U.S. Attorney of Utah. Father of Scott M. Matheson.
- Scott M. Matheson (January 8, 1929 – October 7, 1990), Governor of Utah from 1977 to 1985. Democrat. Chair of the Democratic National Policy Commission. Son of Scott M. Matheson, Sr. Cousin to Marion G. Romney. His grandmother Maria Luella Redd sister Teressa Artemisa Redd was a mother of Marion G. Romney.
- Scott Matheson, Jr. (born 1953), U.S. Attorney for the District of Utah from 1993 to 1997. He was the Democratic candidate for governor of Utah in 2004. Son of Governor Scott M. Matheson and the elder brother of Congressman Jim Matheson. Cousin of Marion G. Romney. Appointed to the 10th Circuit Court of Appeals by Obama.
- Jim Matheson (born March 21, 1960), Member of the United States House of Representatives, representing Utah's 2nd congressional district from 2001 to 2013, and Utah's 4th congressional district from 2013 to 2015. Democrat. Son of Governor Scott M. Matheson. Cousin of Marion G. Romney.
