= George Mousley Cannon =

American politician

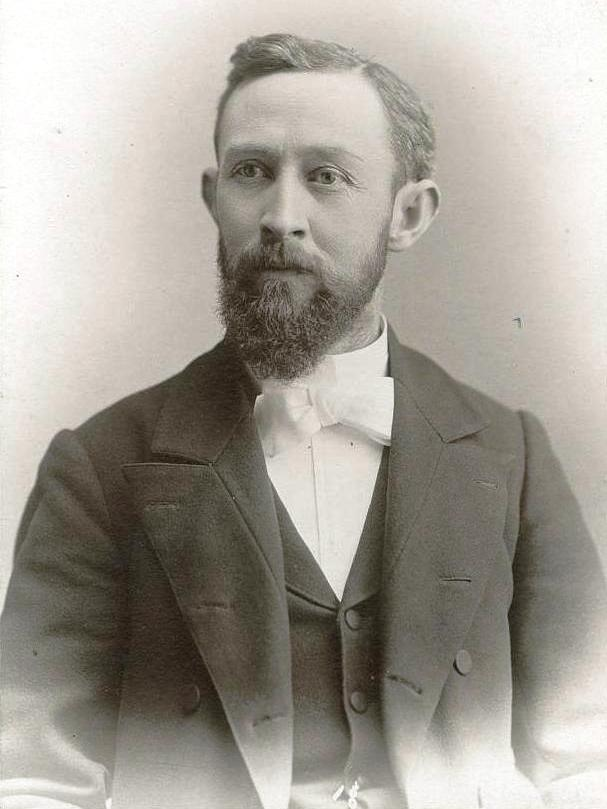
- Cannon during term as Utah State Senate president

President of the Senate

In office
- November 5, 1895 – January 13, 1896
- Successor: Aquila Nebeker

Member of the Utah Senate from the 6th district

In office
- November 5, 1895 – January 13, 1896
- Successor: Benjamin A. Harbour

County Recorder from 1884 to 1890

In office
- 1884 – 1890

Deputy County Recorder for Salt Lake County

In office
- 1882 – 1884

Personal details
- Born: December 25, 1861; St. George, Utah Territory, United States
- Died: January 23, 1937 (aged 75); Centerville, Davis County, Utah, United States
- Resting place: Wasatch Lawn Memorial Park; 40.6978°N 111.8417°W
- Alma mater: University of Utah
- Spouse(s): 3
- Children: 26
- Parents: Angus Munn Cannon; Sarah Maria Mousley

George Mousley Cannon (December 25, 1861 – January 23, 1937) was the first president of the Utah State Senate.

Cannon was born in St. George, Utah Territory, to Angus Munn Cannon and his wife Sarah Maria Mousley. Cannon was born in a wagon box because at that time no homes had been constructed in St. George. When Cannon was about seven years old, he moved with his family to Salt Lake City. From 1877 to 1880, Cannon studied at the University of Utah. After this he taught at the school located on the farm of his uncle George Q. Cannon.

In 1882, Cannon left the school to become Deputy County Recorder for Salt Lake County. He then served as County Recorder from 1884 to 1890.

Cannon married Marian Adelaide Morris on December 25, 1884; they had 10 children.

In 1890, Cannon moved to Brigham Young's old Forest Farm which he had just purchased and he turned the area into the Salt Lake City neighborhood of Forest Dale. Cannon became a cashier in Zion's Savings Bank and Trust Company. He served as a delegate to the 1895 Utah State Constitutional Convention and chaired the committee which formulated the articles on taxation and public debt. In 1896, Cannon was elected to the Utah State Senate and served as its first president.

When the Church of Jesus Christ of Latter-day Saints (LDS Church) modified stake boundaries in 1900, dividing the new Granite Stake off from the Salt Lake Stake, Cannon became the Sunday School Superintendent of the new stake.

From 1901 until after 1930, Cannon served as a member of the General Board of the Deseret Sunday School Union.

Cannon practiced plural marriage after the 1890 Manifesto. He married Ellen Christina Steffensen on June 17, 1901, by whom he had 10 children, and Katherine Vaughan Morris (his first wife's sister) on August 7, 1901, by whom he had six children.
