= Charles Henry Wilcken =

German-American artilleryman (1830–1914)

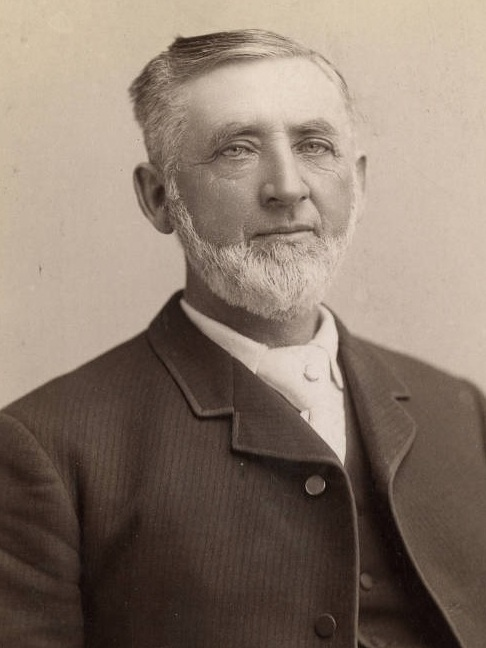
- Wilcken ca. 1890

Military career
- Allegiance: Prussia; United States
- Rank: Sergeant (Prussia); Private (U.S. Army); Colonel (Utah Territorial Militia)
- Battles/wars: First Schleswig War; Utah War
- Awards: Iron Cross

Personal details
- Born: Carl Heinrich Wilcken; October 5, 1831; Eckhorst, Duchy of Holstein (now in Stockelsdorf, Ostholstein, Germany)
- Died: April 9, 1915 (aged 84); Salt Lake City, Utah, United States
- Spouse(s): Eliza Christina Carolina Reiche + 3 others
- Children: 18
- Relatives: George W. Romney (great-grandson)

Carl Heinrich "Charles Henry" Wilcken (October 5, 1831 – April 9, 1915) was a German-American artilleryman who was awarded the Iron Cross by the King of Prussia, Frederick William IV.

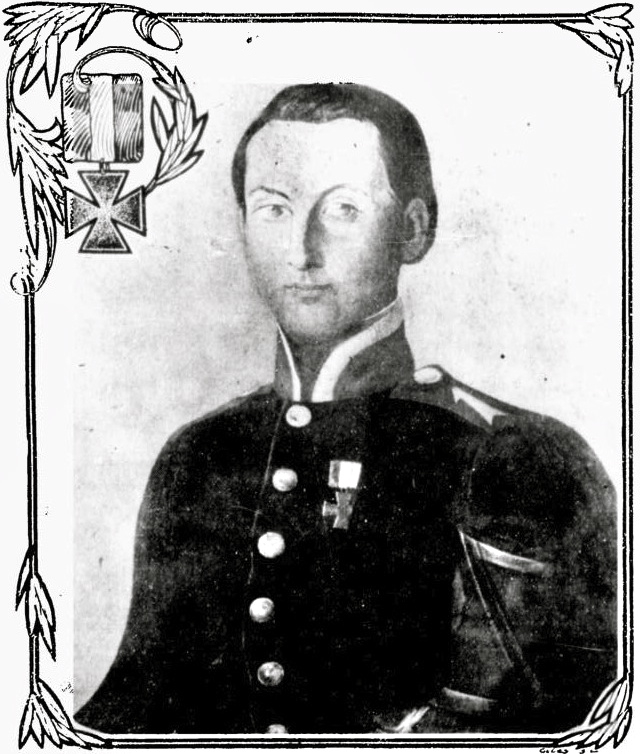
Illustration of Wilcken (depicted in a Prussian uniform, c. 1847) published in 1912 in the Deseret News

On arrival in the United States in 1857, lacking English and possessing military skills and discipline, he signed on with what came to be known as Johnston's Army, a part of the United States Army sent to put down the so-called "Mormon Rebellion" (also known as the Utah War). He got permission to hunt for game to supplement the military rations. On one such trip he met some Mormons and decided to desert to join them. Later, to cover his defection, it was claimed that he had been captured by the Utah Territorial militia (the "Nauvoo Legion") at Fort Bridger. Wilcken later joined the Church of Jesus Christ of Latter-day Saints (LDS Church), and served as water commissioner directing irrigation, as a municipal policeman, and as superintendent of the Deseret Telegraph Company.

Wilcken's granddaughter Anna Amelia Pratt was the mother of American politician George W. (George Wilcken) Romney.

== Biography ==
Wilcken left Holstein, then ruled as a Duchy by the King of Denmark as Duke of Holstein, while a member of the German Confederation, in 1857, ahead of his wife Eliza Christina Carolina Reiche Wilcken (1830–1906) and two small children. He planned to emigrate to Argentina to join his brothers there; however, while waiting in London to sail, he ran out of funds and could only afford to go to New York City. Wilcken's family joined him in the U.S. in 1860. Wilcken eventually had three additional wives and fathered 18 children.

Six foot four inches tall, Wilcken worked as a miller in Salt Lake City, a skill he learned in Prussia. Later he served as the friend, driver, and bodyguard for LDS Church presidents John Taylor and Wilford Woodruff. He assisted leaders of the LDS Church to relocate their polygamous families and he served as a go-between for them and their families when they were imprisoned.
