= Gobbler's Knob =

Gobbler's Knob may refer to:

- The home of Punxsutawney Phil, the groundhog who is the central figure in Punxsutawney, Pennsylvania's annual Groundhog Day celebration.
- Gobbler's Knob Fire Lookout, a fire lookout tower in Mount Rainier National Park in Washington, US.
- Gobblers Knob (Utah), a Wasatch Range summit near Salt Lake City, Utah
- Gobbler's Knob, a prominent geographical landmark in the San Bernardino National Forest of California.
