= Kesler Peak (Wasatch Range) =

Mountain in Salt Lake County, Utah, United States

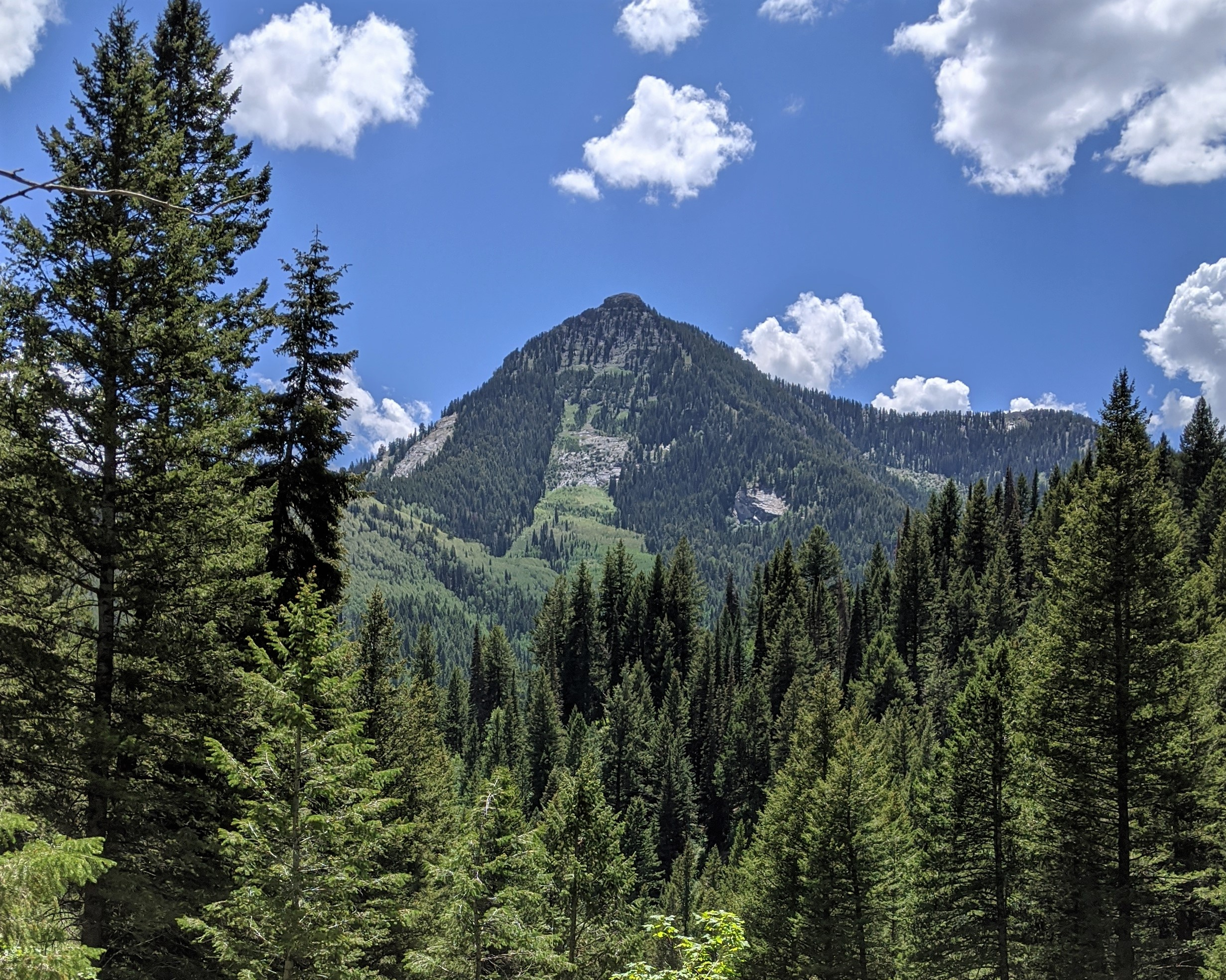
- North aspect

Highest point
- Elevation: 10,403 ft (3,171 m)
- Prominence: 443 ft (135 m)
- Parent peak: Superior Peak (11,132 ft)
- Isolation: 1.89 mi (3.04 km)
- Coordinates: 40°37′30″N 111°40′08″W

Naming
- Etymology: Frederick Kesler

Geography
- Location within Utah Location within the United States
- Location: Big Cottonwood Canyon
- Country: United States of America
- State: Utah
- County: Salt Lake
- Parent range: Wasatch Range; Rocky Mountains
- Topo map: USGS Mount Aire

Geology
- Rock age: Carboniferous
- Rock type: Sedimentary rock

Climbing
- Easiest route: class 1+ hiking

Kesler Peak is a 10,403-foot elevation (3,171 m) mountain summit located in Salt Lake County, Utah, United States.

== Description ==
Kesler Peak is set in the Wasatch Range which is a subset of the Rocky Mountains. It is situated in Big Cottonwood Canyon, on land managed by Wasatch National Forest. Salt Lake City is 13 miles to the northwest and Solitude Mountain Resort is four miles to the east. Neighbors include Mount Raymond three miles to the northwest and Gobblers Knob is 3.2 miles to the north. Precipitation runoff from the mountain's slopes drains to Big Cottonwood Creek. Topographic relief is significant as the summit rises 3,400 feet (1,000 meters) above Big Cottonwood Canyon in 1.5 mile.

== History ==
The spelling of this mountain's toponym was officially changed in 2008 by the United States Board on Geographic Names. Prior to that it was spelled "Kessler Peak" which appears on older maps, and was also known as "Kessler's Peak" in the early 1900s. This landform is named after Frederick Kesler (1816–1899), Mormon bishop, mill architect, justice of the peace and school warden. There is another Kesler Peak (elevation 8,747 ft) located in the Oquirrh Mountains of Tooele County, Utah, which is also named after this same person.

Kesler Peak is centrally located in the Big Cottonwood Mining District. From 1867 to 1976, the Big Cottonwood and Little Cottonwood mining districts combined to produce 30,600 ounces of gold, 17.5 million ounces of silver, 4.7 million pounds of zinc, 18.1 million pounds of copper, and 252 million pounds of lead. The Carbonate Mine, situated high on the east slope of Kesler Peak, was a major producer.

== Gallery ==
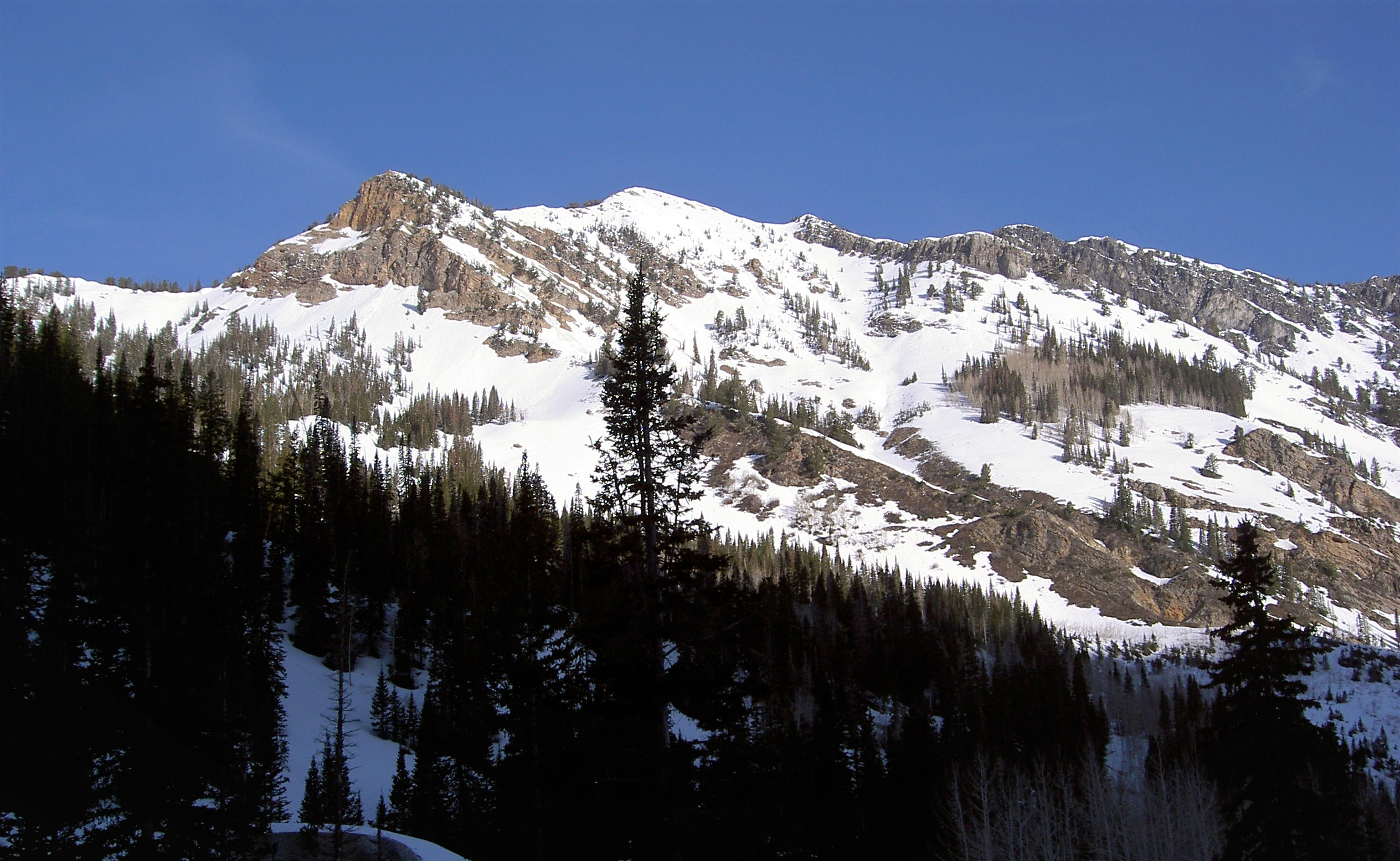
Southeast aspect

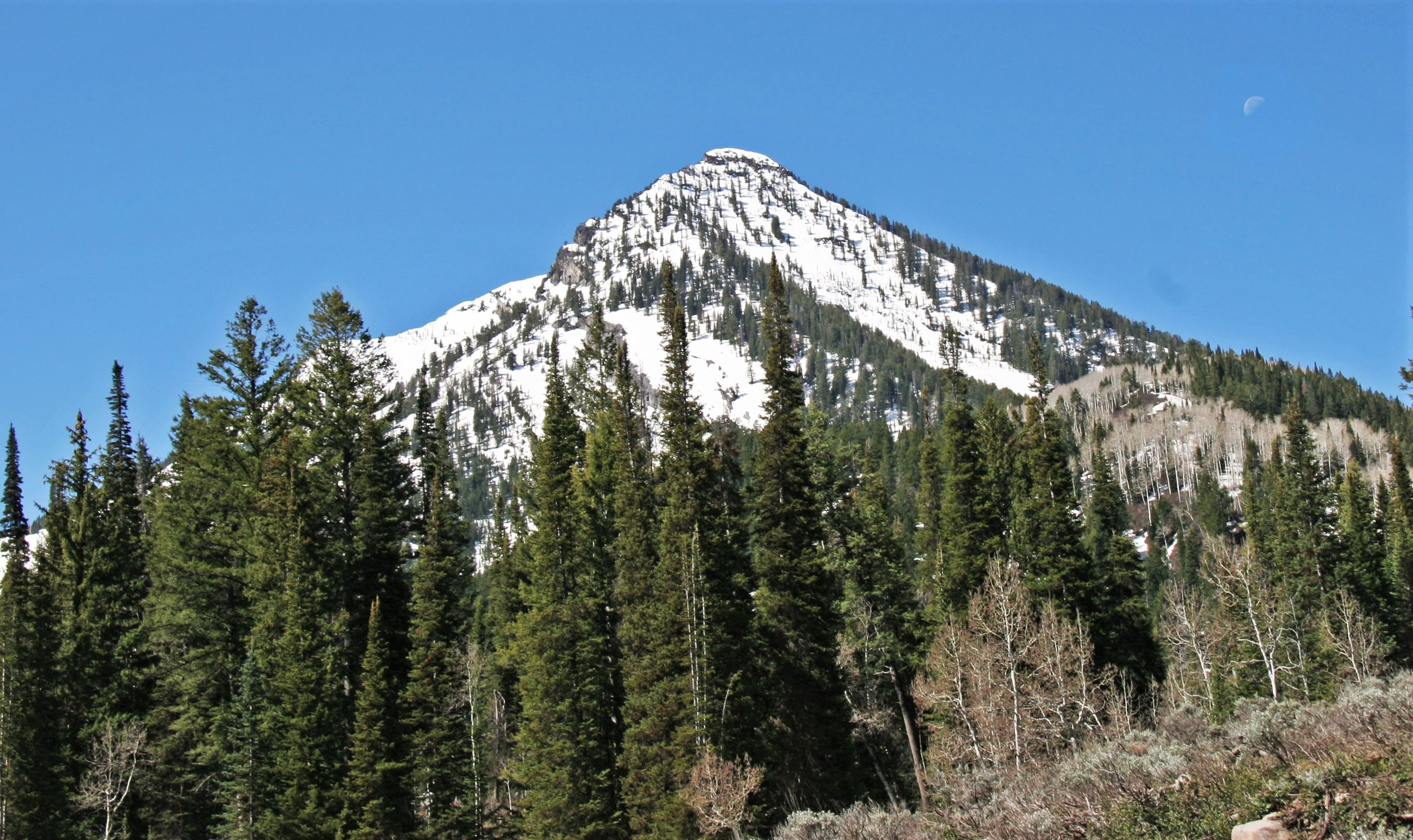
Kesler Peak seen from the trailhead to Doughnut Falls

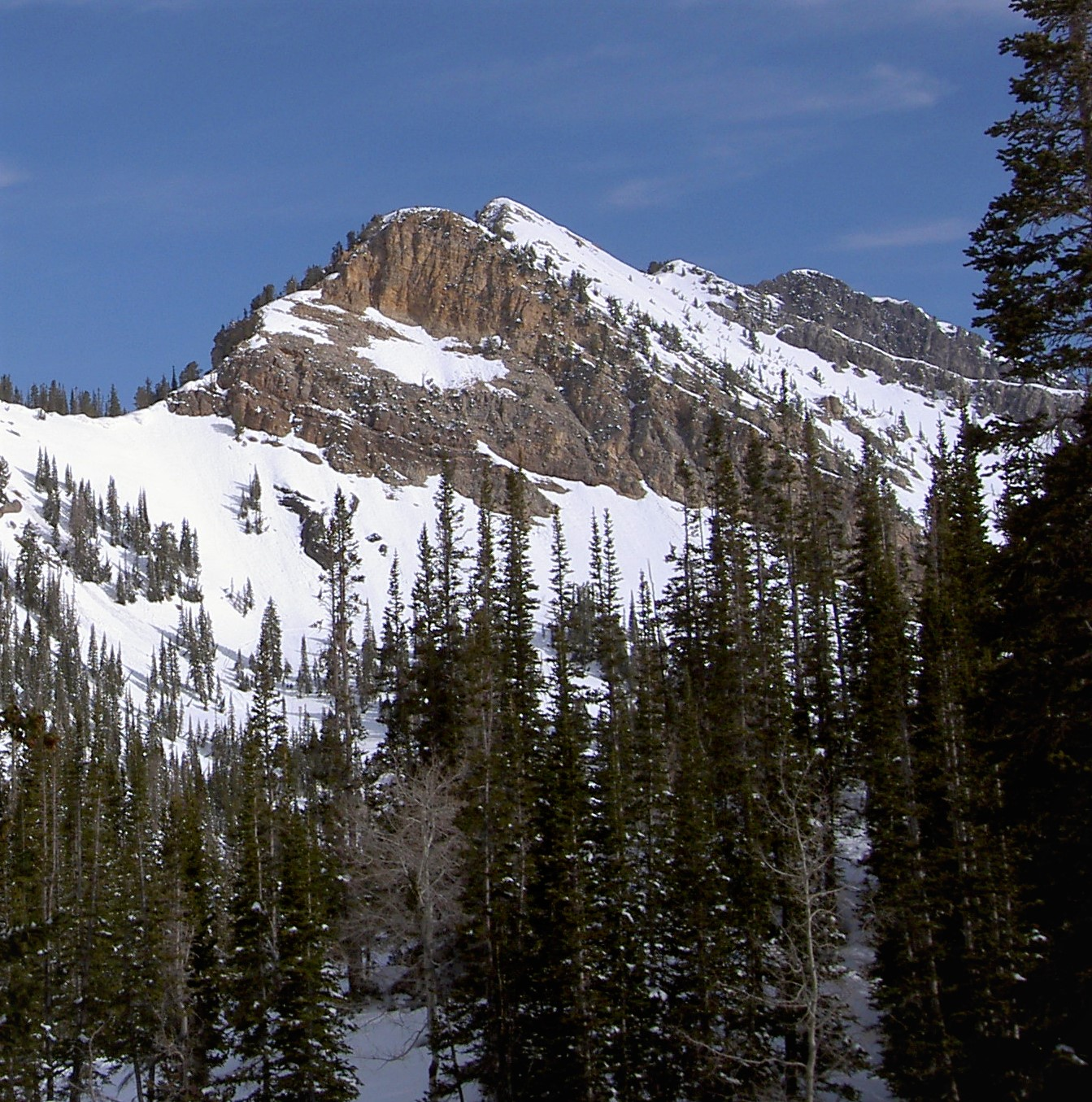
South aspect

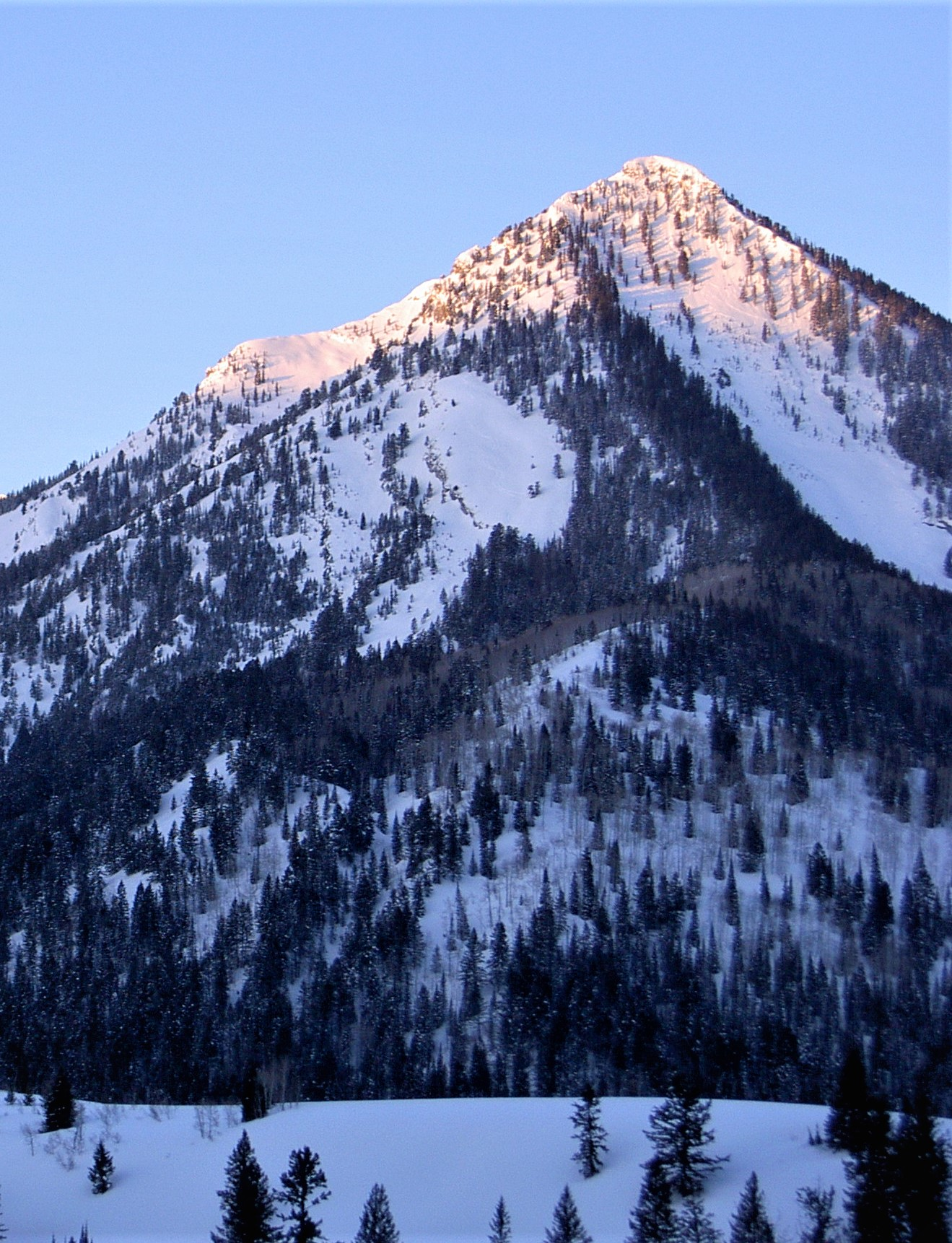

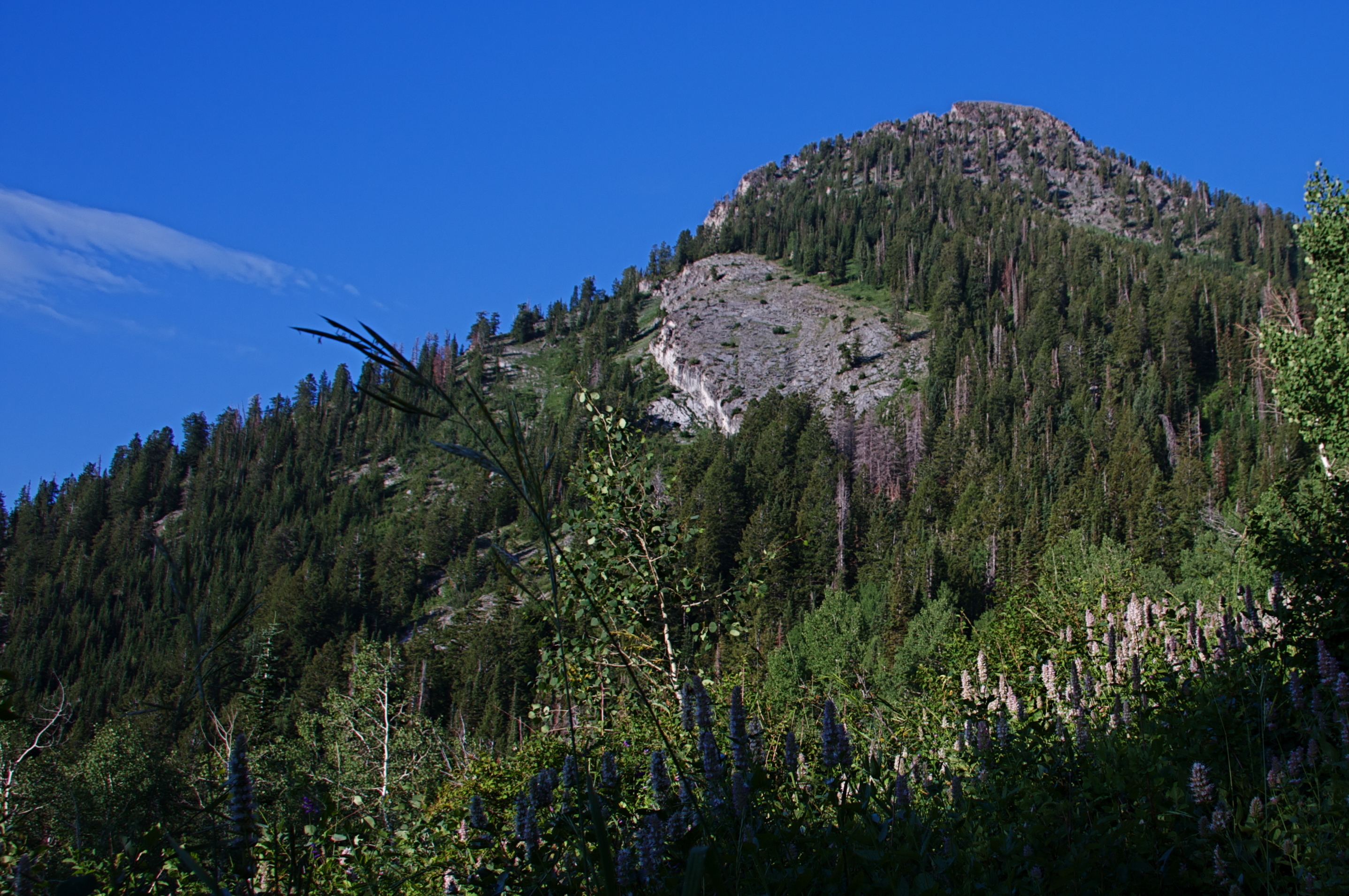
Northeast slope of Kesler Peak

== See also ==
- List of mountains in Utah
