= Mount Raymond (Utah) =

Mountain summit located in Salt Lake County, Utah, US

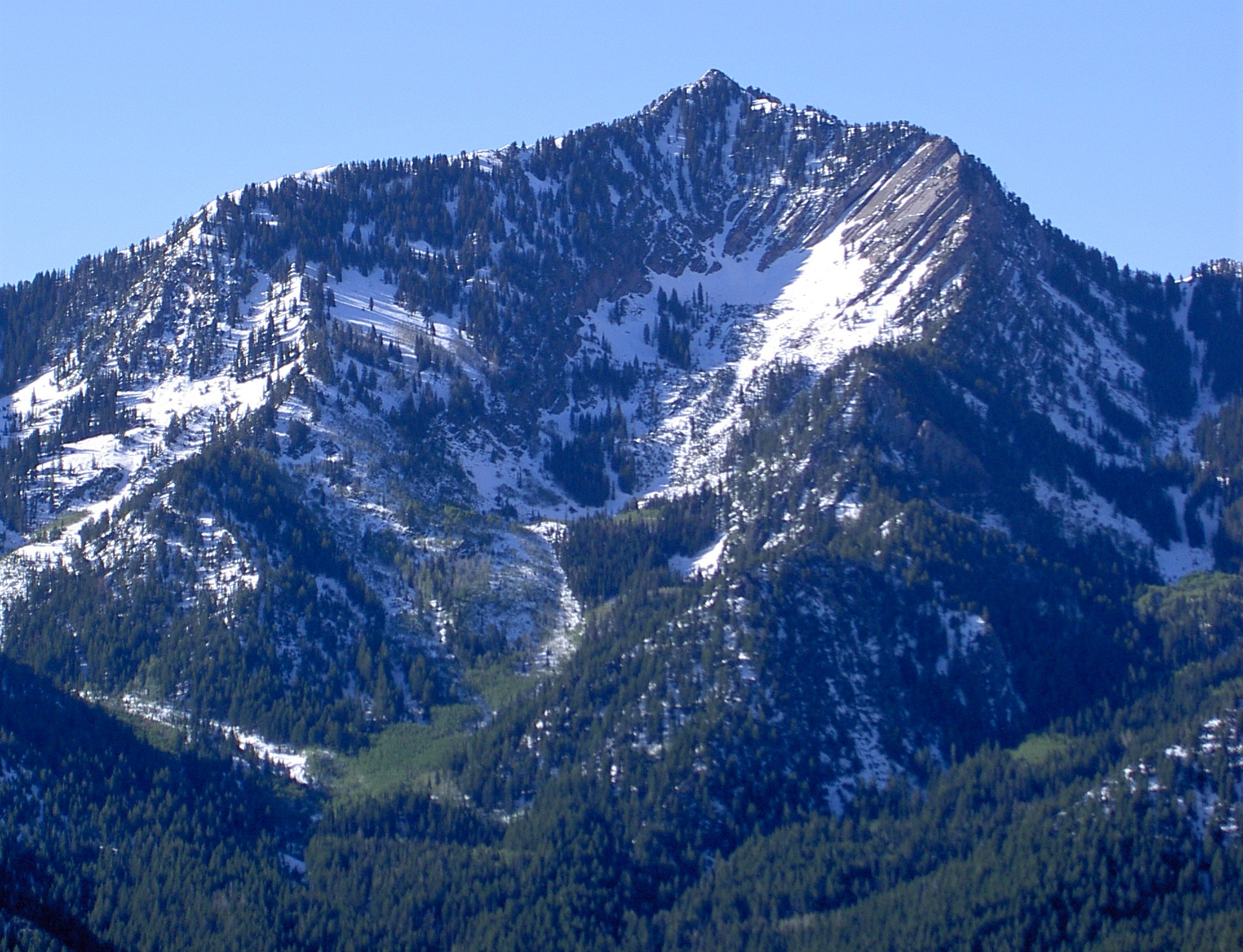
- North aspect

Highest point
- Elevation: 10,241 ft (3,121 m)
- Prominence: 881 ft (269 m)
- Parent peak: Gobblers Knob (10,246 ft)
- Isolation: 1.33 mi (2.14 km)
- Coordinates: 40°39′30″N 111°42′07″W

Geography
- Location within Utah Location within the United States
- Location: Mount Olympus Wilderness
- Country: United States of America
- State: Utah
- County: Salt Lake
- Parent range: Wasatch Range; Rocky Mountains
- Topo map: USGS Mount Aire

Geology
- Rock type: Weber quartzite

Climbing
- Easiest route: class 2

Mount Raymond is a 10,241-foot elevation (3,121 m) mountain summit located in Salt Lake County, Utah, United States.

== Description ==
Mount Raymond is set along the boundary of the Mount Olympus Wilderness on land managed by Wasatch National Forest, with Salt Lake City 11 miles to the west and Park City 11 miles to the east. It is situated in the Wasatch Range which is a subset of the Rocky Mountains. Neighbors include Mount Olympus four miles to the west, Kesler Peak three miles southeast, and line parent Gobblers Knob is 1.5 mile to the northeast. Precipitation runoff from the mountain's north slope drains to Mill Creek, whereas the south slope drains to Big Cottonwood Creek. Topographic relief is significant as the summit rises 3,640 feet (1,110 meters) above Big Cottonwood Canyon in 1.5 mile. This mountain's toponym has been officially adopted by the United States Board on Geographic Names.

== Climate ==
Mount Raymond has a subarctic climate (Köppen Dfc), bordering on an Alpine climate (Köppen ET), with long, cold, snowy winters, and cool to warm summers. Due to its altitude, it receives precipitation all year, as snow in winter, and as thunderstorms in summer.

== Gallery ==
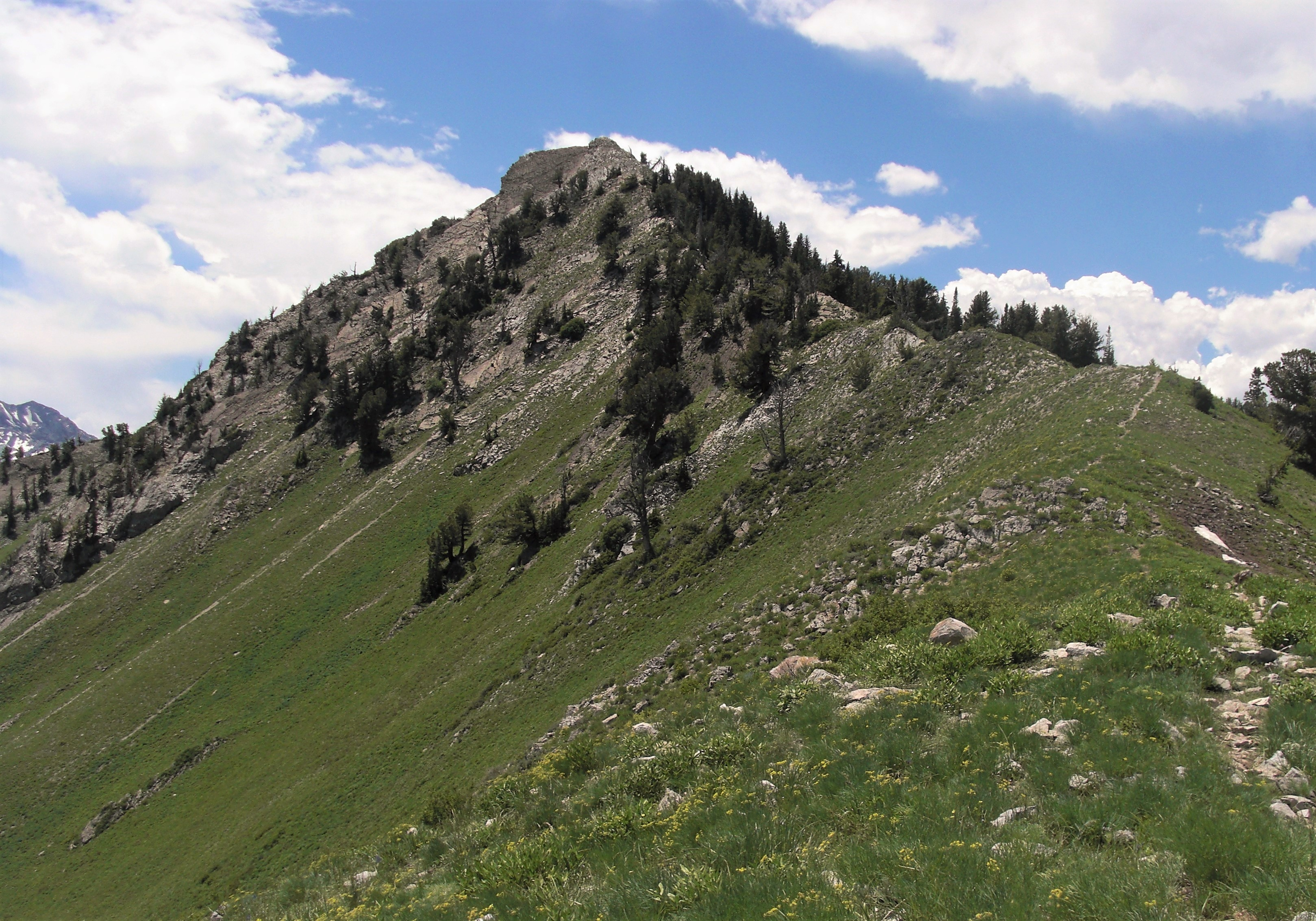
Approaching summit from northeast ridge

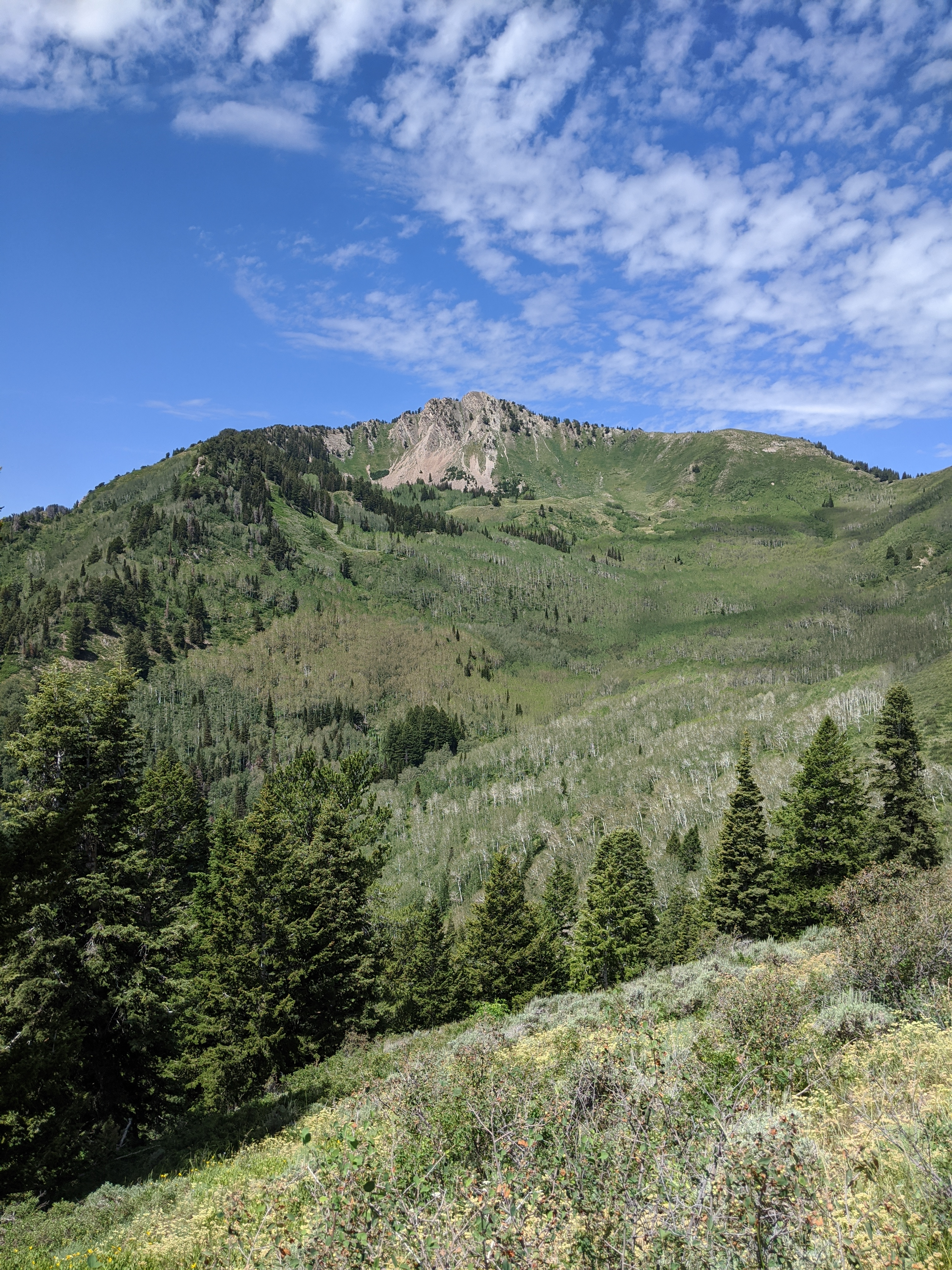
Mt. Raymond, east aspect

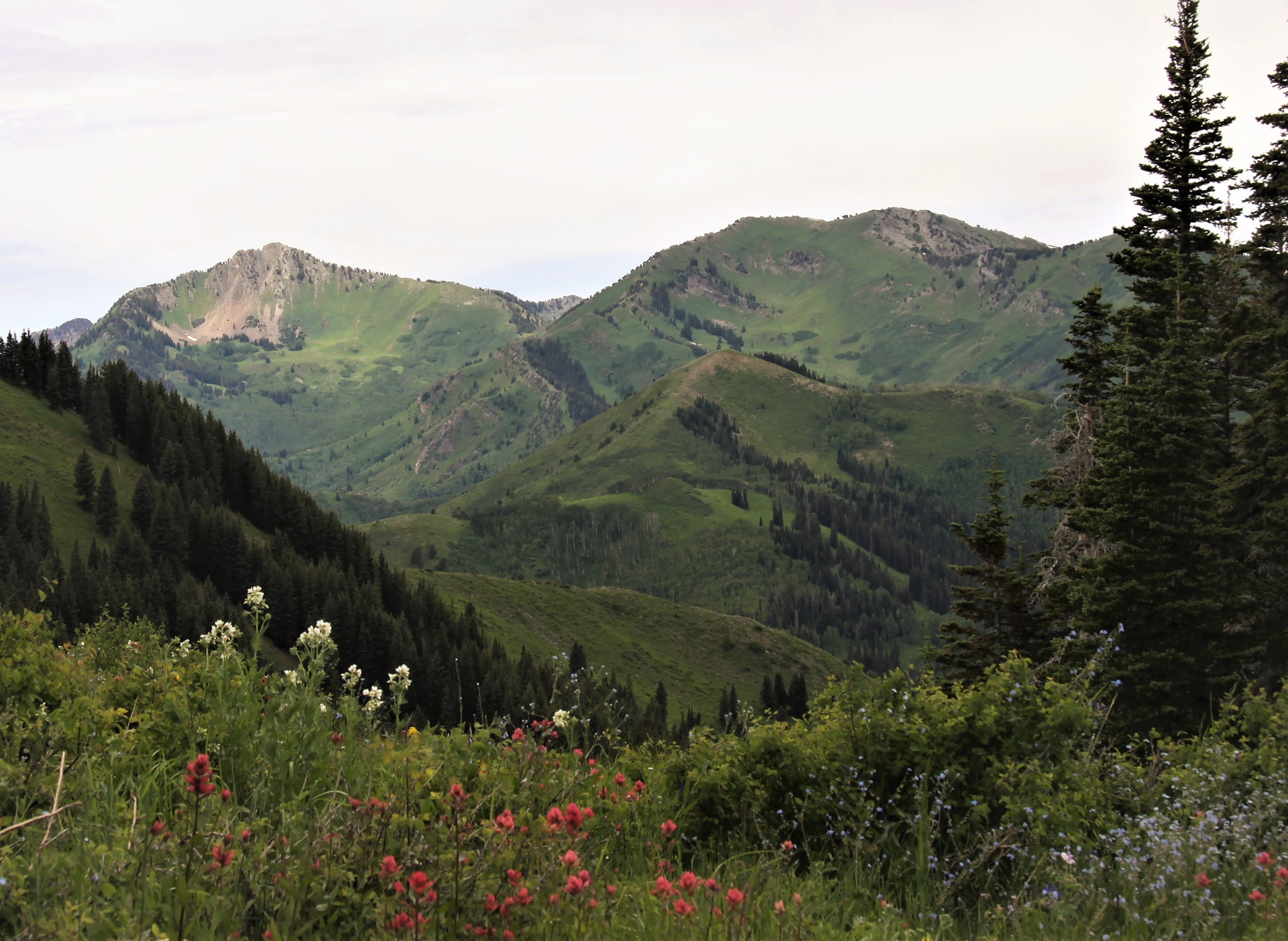
Mount Raymond (left) and Gobblers Knob (right) from southeast

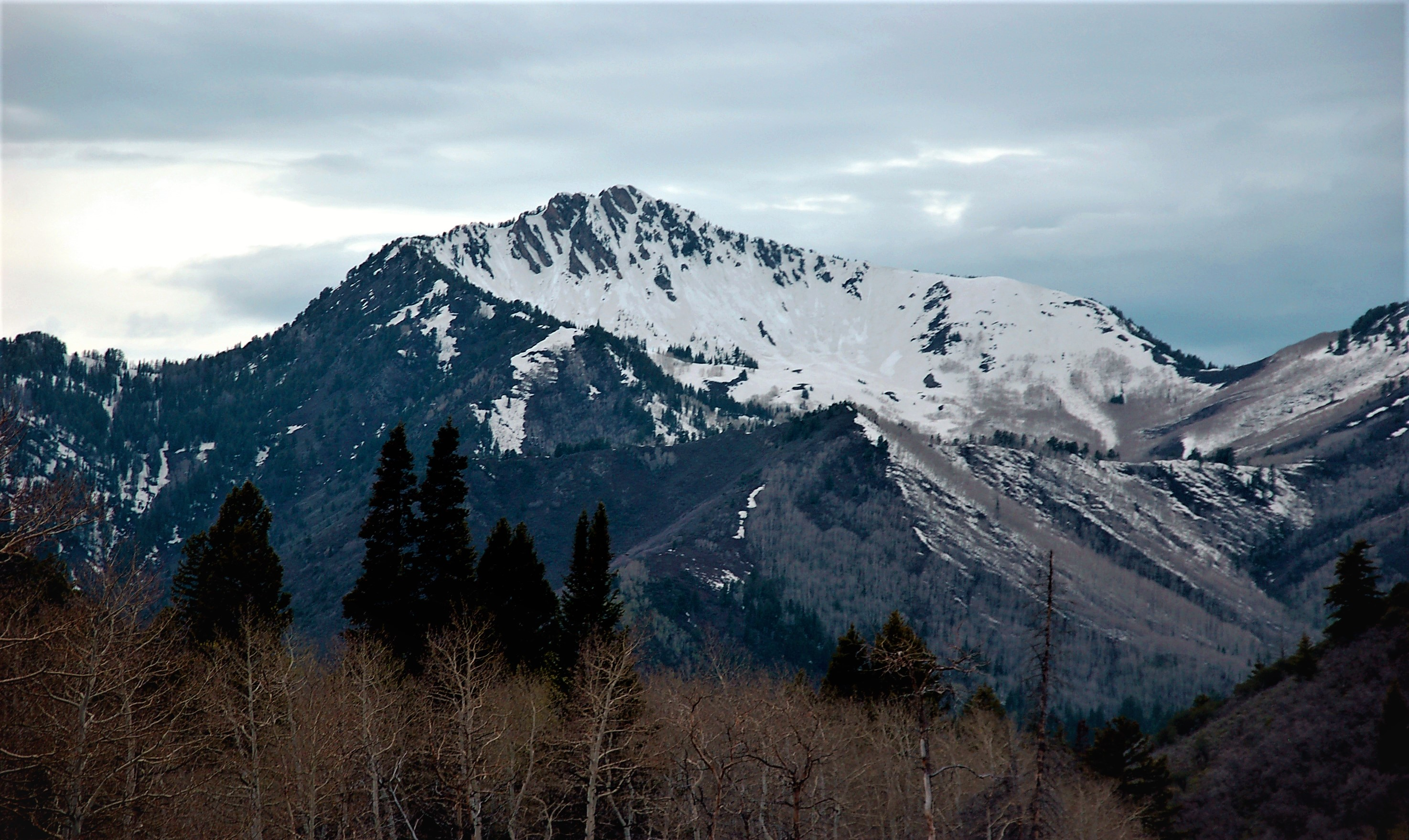
East aspect from Big Cottonwood Canyon

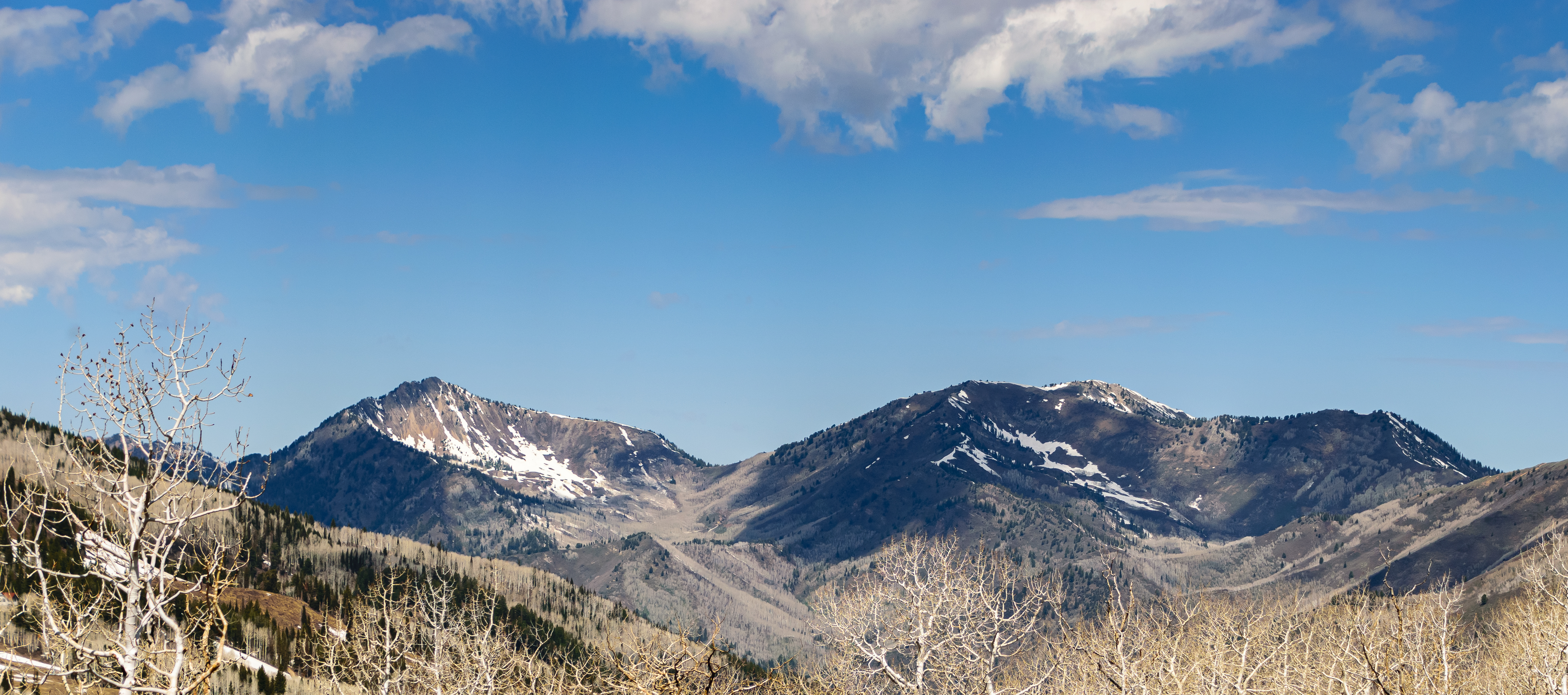
Mount Raymond (left) and Gobblers Knob (right)

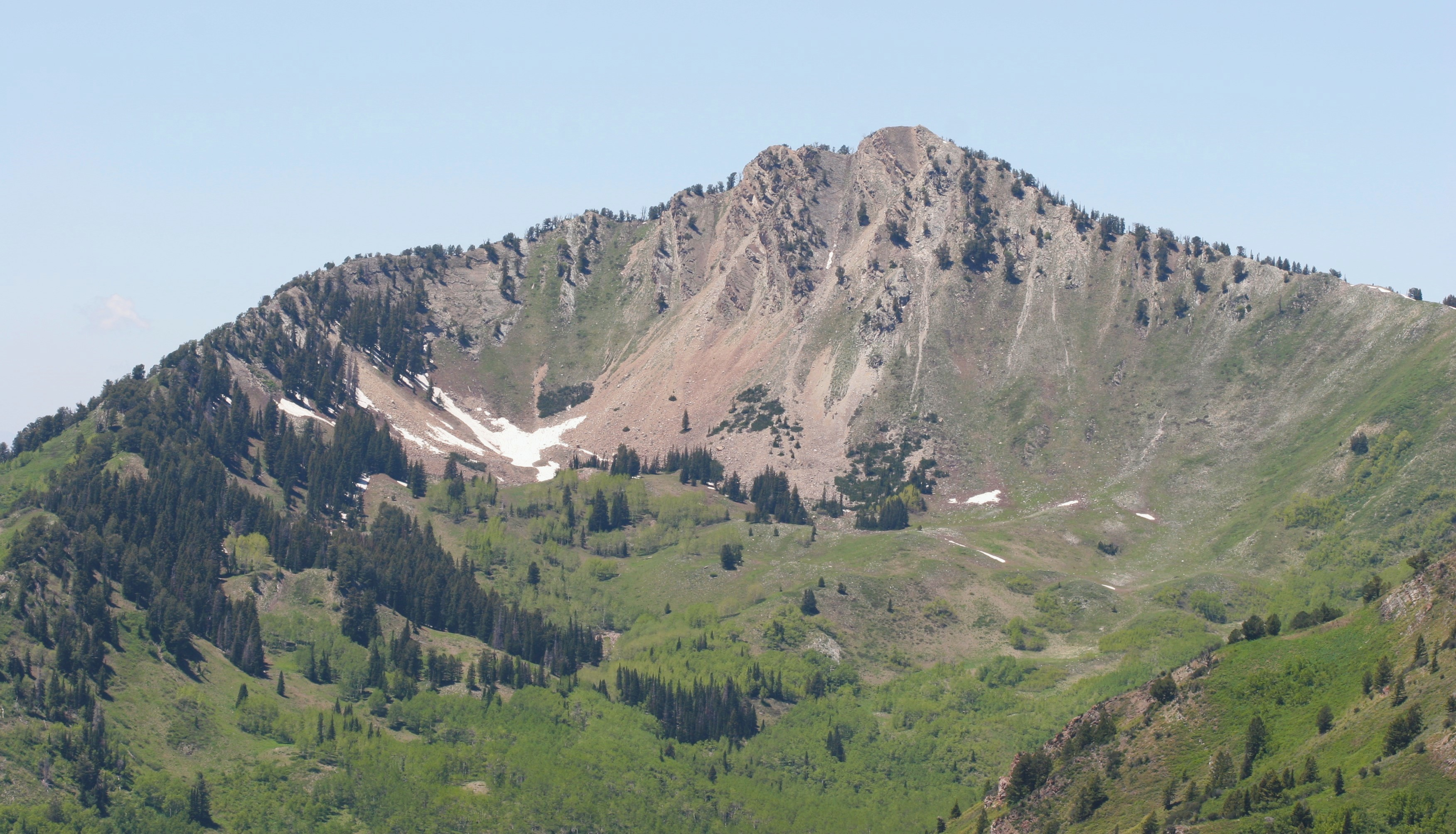
East aspect
