= Calf Creek Falls =

Waterfalls in Utah, United States

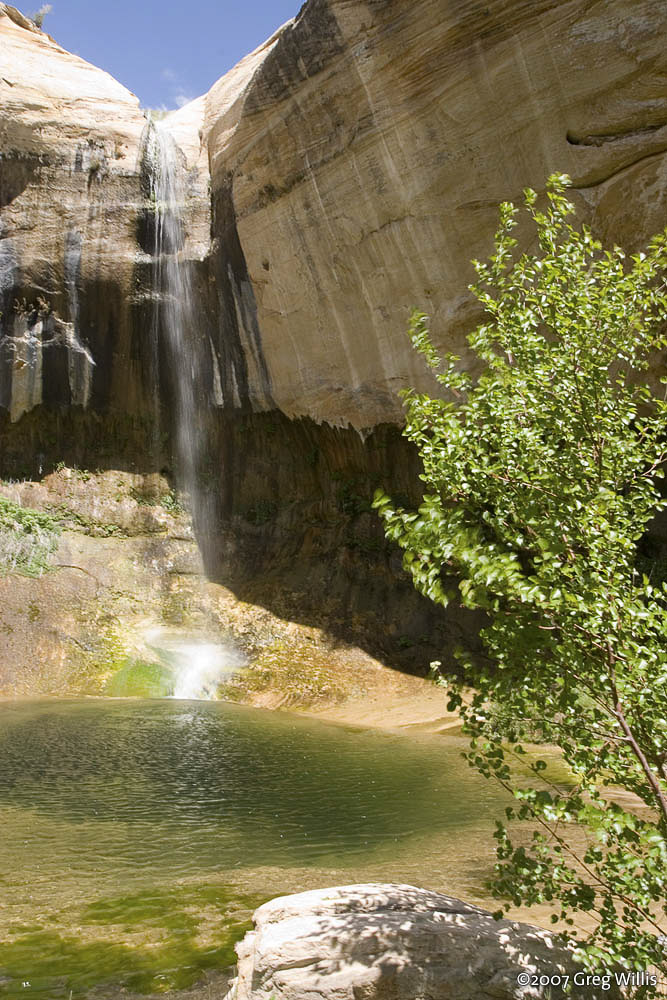
Upper Calf Creek Falls, May 2007

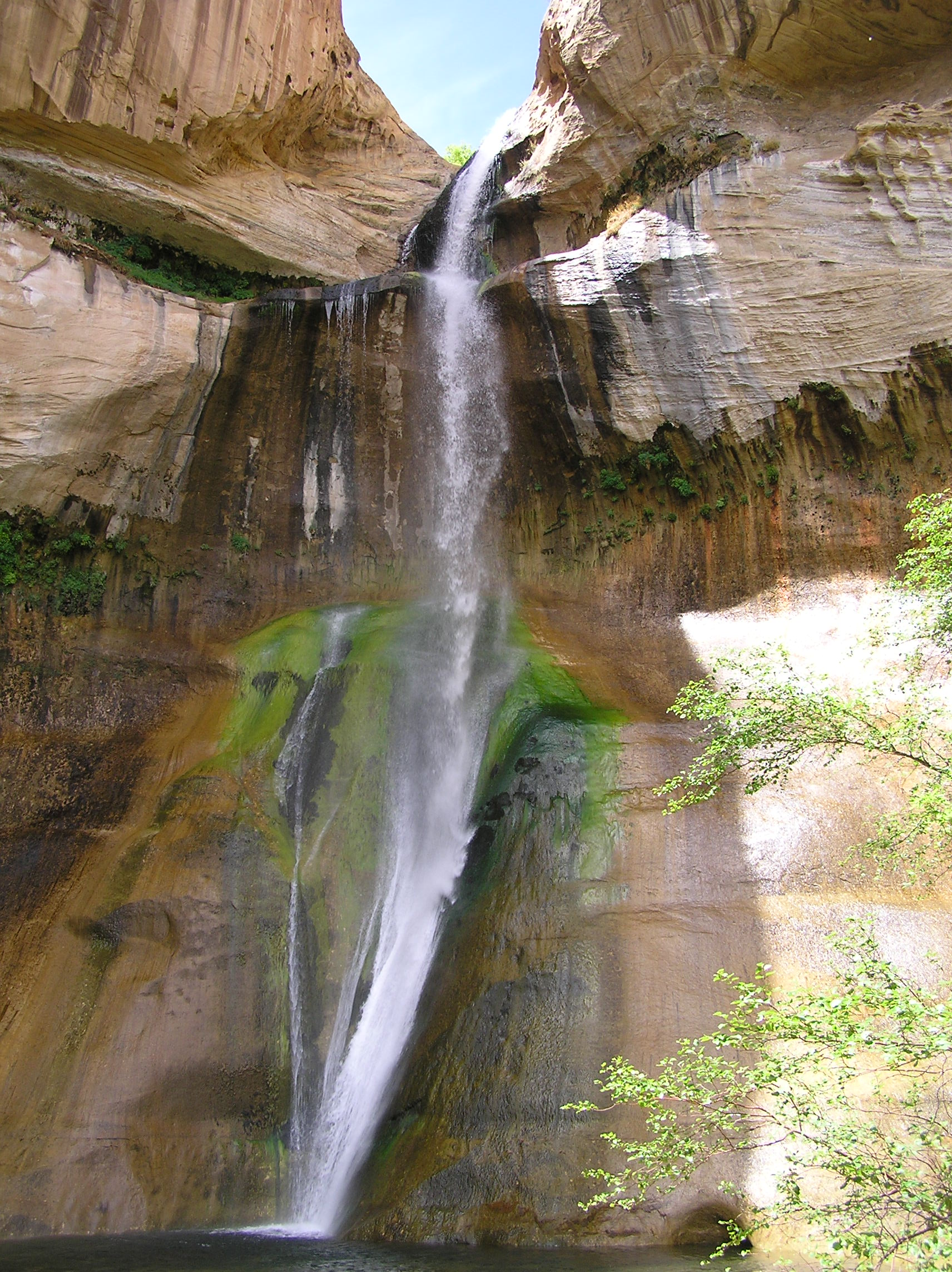
Lower Calf Creek Falls, May 2004

Calf Creek Falls refers to a pair of perennial waterfalls on the Calf Creek in the Grand Staircase–Escalante National Monument in central Garfield County, Utah, United States, that total 214 feet (65 m).

== Description ==
The two tiers of the falls are roughly 2.5 miles (4.0 km) apart. While both tiers are accessible by trail (with both trailheads just off Utah State Route 12), there is no direct access between the tiers.

=== Lower tier ===
Lower Calf Creek Falls is a 126-foot (38 m) cascade and is very popular, because it can be reached by an easy hike on a 5.7-mile (9.2 km) roundtrip trail. The lower falls have an elevation of 5,545 feet (1,690 m) and coordinates of 37°49′45″N 111°25′12″W.

=== Upper tier ===
Upper Calf Creek Falls is an 88-foot (27 m) plunge and is much less known, as it requires a 2-mile (3.2 km) roundtrip scramble from the western ridgeline. The lower falls have an elevation of 5,942 feet (1,811 m) and coordinates of 37°51′18″N 111°27′07″W. Just above the upper falls is another smaller, but deep plunge pool (at the base a much smaller cascade) that has a somewhat easier access and is often used for swimming and diving.

== Gallery ==
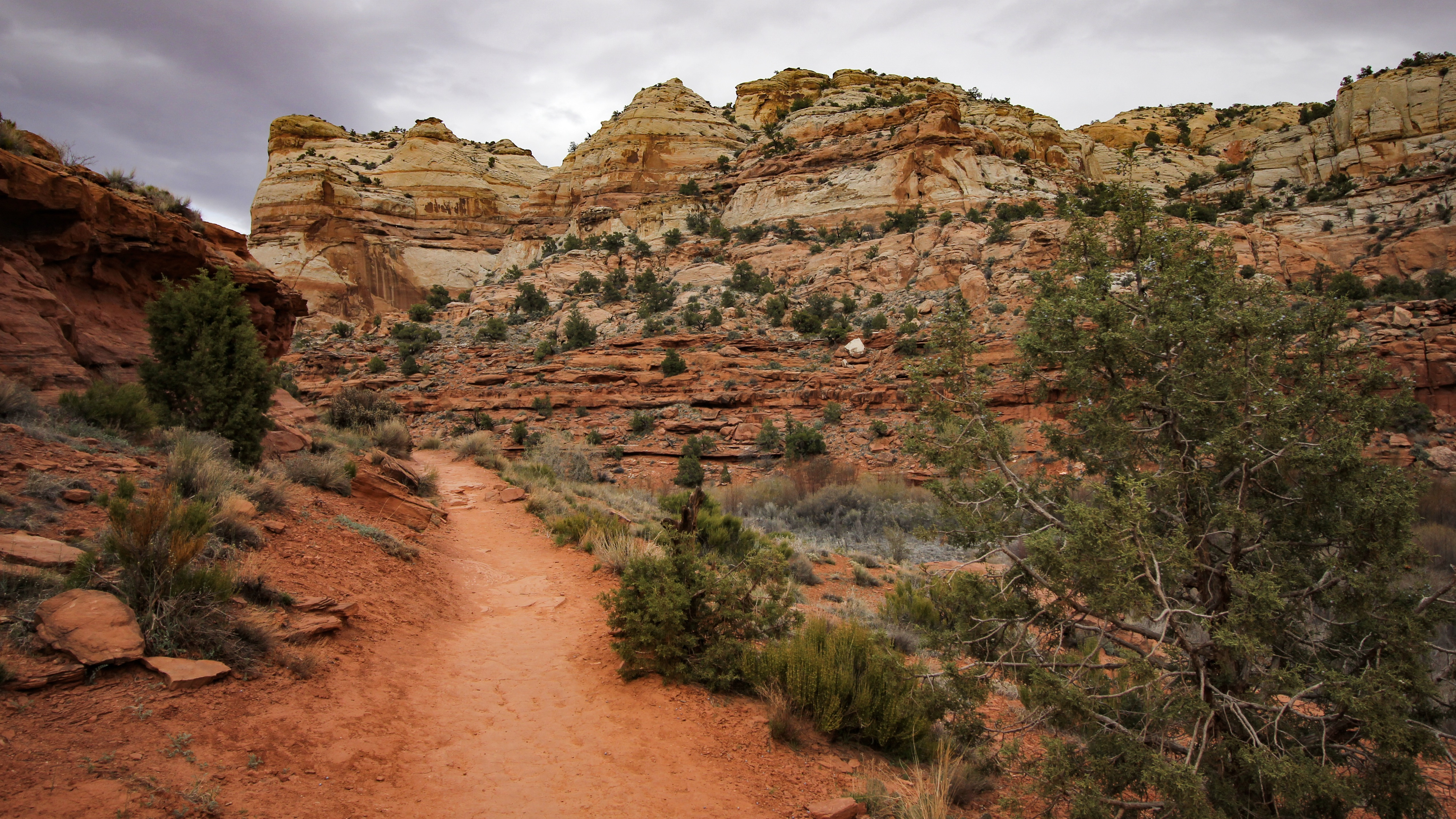
Lower Calf Creek Falls Trail, April 2019

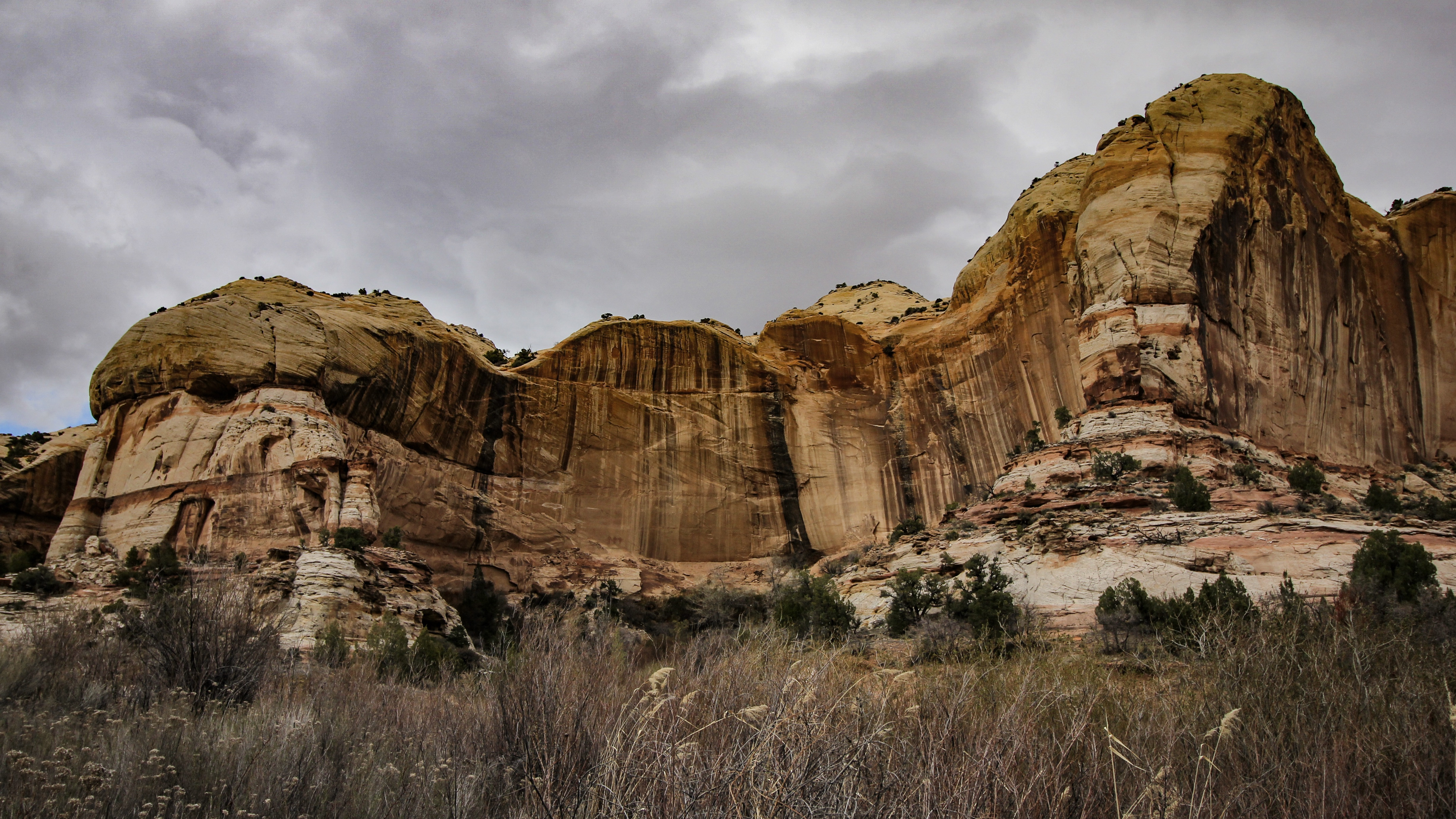
Rock formation with Fremont culture pictograms, April 2019

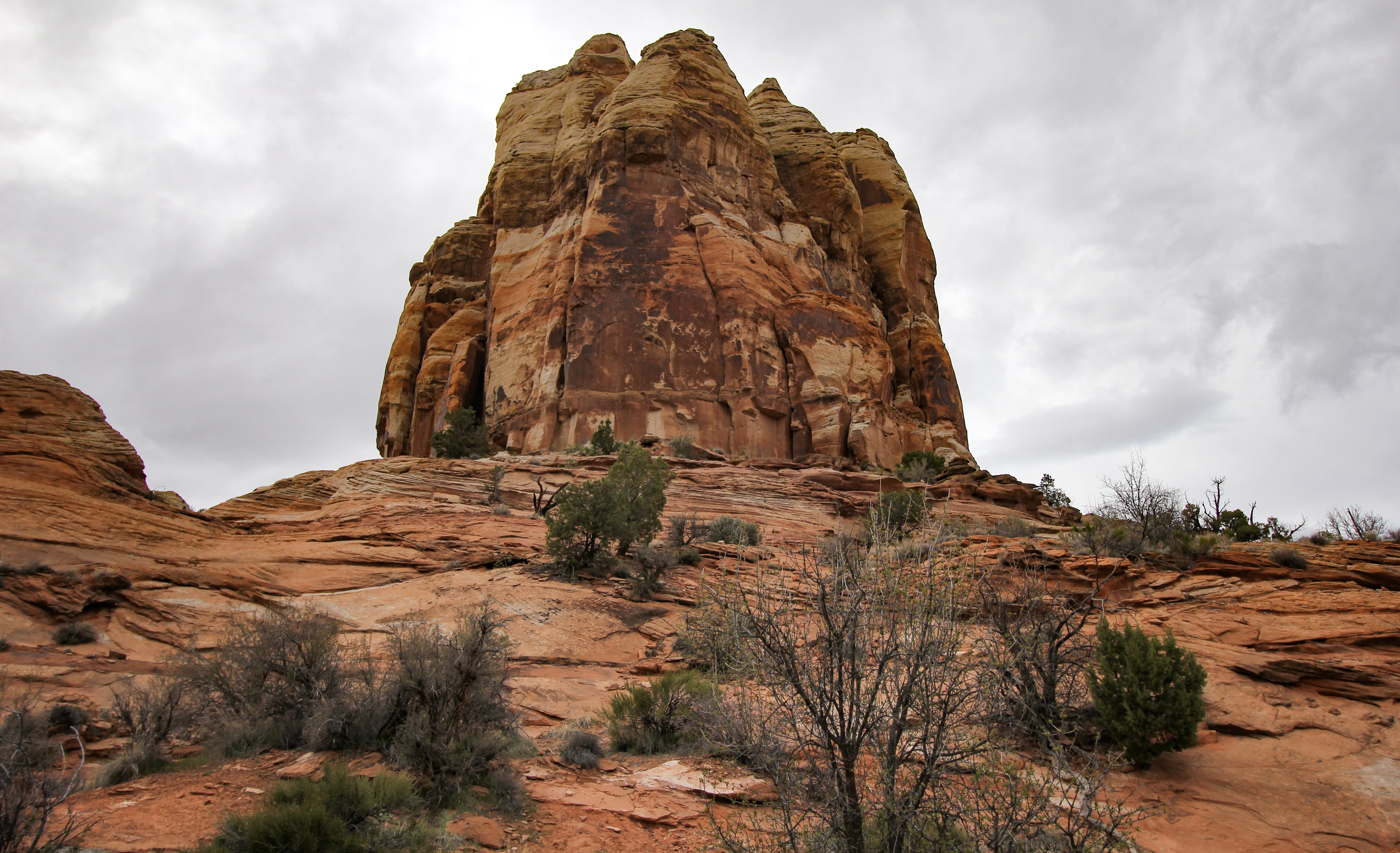
Rock formation at Lower Calf Creek Falls, April 2019

== See also ==
- List of waterfalls
- List of waterfalls in Utah
