= Neffs Cave =

Cave in Utah, United States

- Neff's Canyon Cave
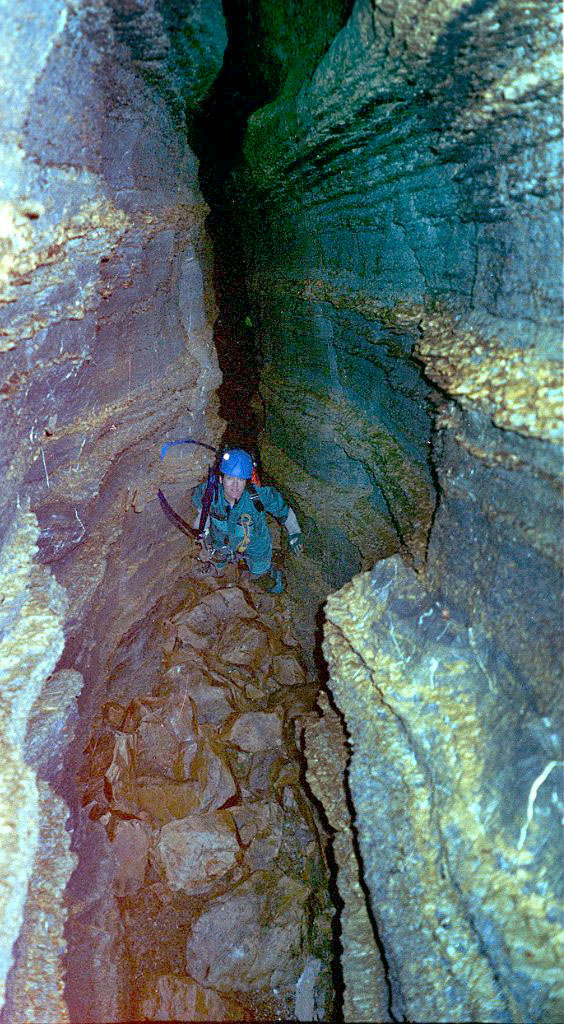
- Typical passage in Neffs Canyon Cave in Utah. The cave is developed along a single fissure passage with many loose rocks and dropoffs requiring rope for descent.
- Interactive map of Neffs Cave
- Location: Salt Lake County, Utah
- Coordinates: 40.676161°N 111.775073°W
- Depth: 1,163 ft (354 m)
- Length: 1,700 ft (520 m)
- Discovery: 1949
- Geology: Limestone, Shale
- Entrances: 1
- Difficulty: Hard
- Hazards: Rotten shale
- Access: Restricted

Neffs Cave (or Neffs Canyon Cave) is a cave in Neffs Canyon on the north side of Mount Olympus, directly east of Millcreek, Utah in the United States. It is one of the deepest caves in the United States but is seldom entered despite its depth and its proximity to Salt Lake City. The United States Forest Service has closed the cave to the public for many years due to safety hazards. In 1977, Neffs Canyon Cave was designated as a National Natural Landmark by the National Park Service.

== Discovery and exploration ==
Neffs Cave was discovered in 1949 by two teenage brothers, John and Jamie Lyon, who were hiking in Neffs Canyon. They returned to the cave several times to explore its depths but lacked the proper equipment to reach the bottom. In one of their last visits, John Lyon and a group of friends became trapped at the bottom of a steep slope of crumbly shale and had to be extracted by a rescue party, headed by his brother Jamie Lyon.

After the rescue, word about the cave began to spread. A party of inexperienced explorers reported that they went an estimated 2,000 feet (610 meters) into the cave and encountered a sheer drop of over 100 feet (30 meters) that prevented their further exploration. They wrote to the Wasatch National Forest staff, "Our advice is, keep out." Subsequently, in 1951 a team under the direction of the National Park Service explored the cave for several hours and reported that the cave had no scenic value and was too dangerous to be a National Park Service attraction.

In 1952 the Salt Lake Grotto of the National Speleological Society was established, and several weeks later, the grotto's members obtained permission from the National Forest Service to explore the cave. They spent nearly eleven hours in the cave but had not reached the end of the main passage before they had to turn back. Teams from the grotto returned in 1953 and 1956, and on the last visit, they succeeded in reaching the bottom of the main passage. They calculated a vertical depth of 1,186 feet (361 meters), which was later revised to 1,163 feet (354 meters). Neffs Cave is the 15th deepest cave discovered in the United States.

== Features and geology ==
The cave entrance is a small, jagged opening in a gully at the base of low limestone cliffs. The main passage of the cave follows a deep fault in the limestone, dipping nearly due north. It descends through layers of limestone and shale, following a sink eroded by the gully stream. Side passages are rare except in an area called the Bedroom Complex, just past the halfway point of the main passage.

Speleothems are uncommon in the cave. Cavers report areas of flowstone and a few stalactites.

== See also ==
- Cave Conservancies
- Cave Research Foundation
- Caving
- Grotto
- List of caves
- National Speleological Society
