= Battle Creek Falls =

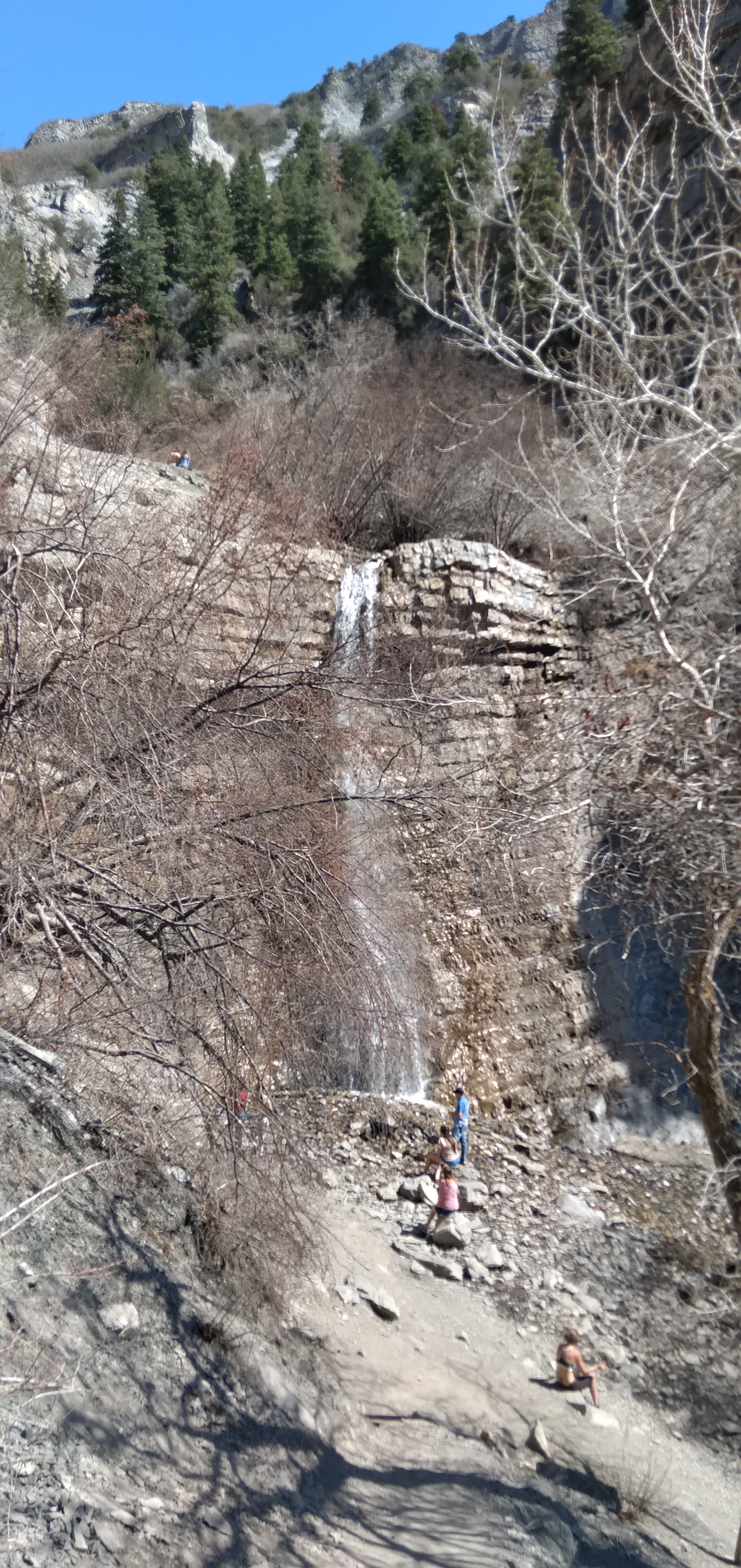
- Battle Creek Falls and visitors
- Interactive map of Battle Creek Falls
- Location: Mount Timpanogos
- Coordinates: 40.36737°N 111.69287°W
- Elevation: 5,671 ft (1,729 m)
- Total height: 50 ft (15 m)

Battle Creek Falls is a waterfall on the west skirt of Mount Timpanogos, east of Pleasant Grove, Utah. Access to Battle Creek Falls is from the Battle Creek Trailhead off the Kiwanis Park picnic area. The waterfall plunges into rock at the base of the cliff without creating a pool. The base and source of the waterfall are accessible from the trail.

== Geography ==
Battle Creek and its waterfall are located in a semi-arid to desert climate in one of the main canyons of the Timpanogos massif. The creek flows from a natural spring located upstream of the waterfall. The creek and waterfall are perennial, however flow varies greatly and is highest during late spring when snowmelt is greatest and lowest during the coldest weeks of winter when the creek and waterfall are mostly frozen.

== Flora ==
Trees found in the area include: water birch, maple, Douglas fir, spruce, oak, aspen and cottonwood. Wildflowers that can be seen during the spring and summer include: western coneflower, clematis, penstemon, and balsam root. Poison ivy and stinging nettle are both found in Battle Creek Canyon.

== Name ==
The canyon, creek, and waterfall are all named after the 1849 massacre of a small band of Ute people by Mormon settlers to the area under orders from then president of the Church of Jesus Christ of Latter-day Saints, Brigham Young. The settlement of Pleasant Grove was initially also named Battle Creek.

== See also ==
- List of waterfalls
- List of waterfalls in Utah
