= Gobblers Knob (Utah) =

Mountain in the American state of Utah

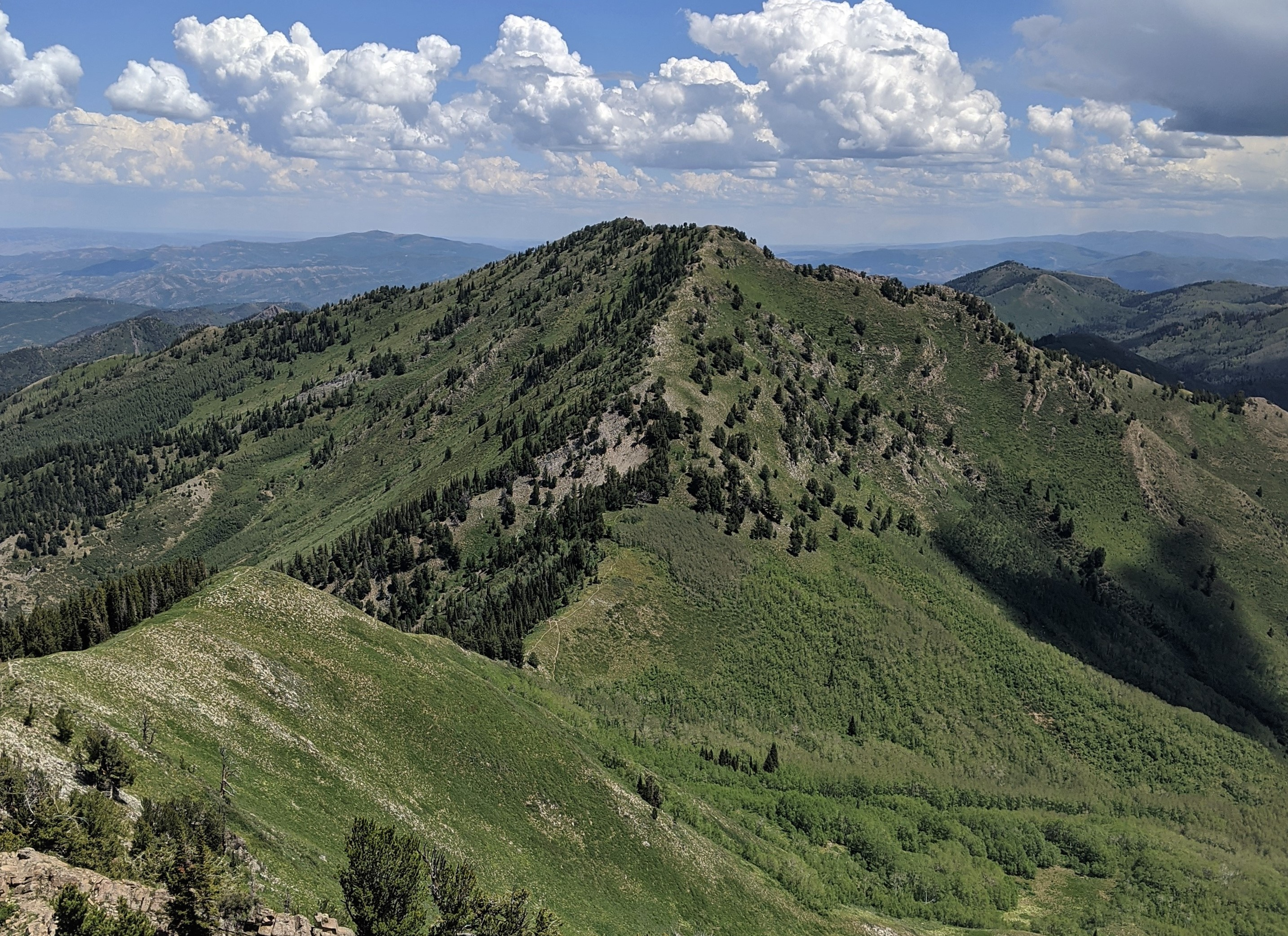
- Southwest aspect, from Mt. Raymond

Highest point
- Elevation: 10,246 ft (3,123 m)
- Prominence: 1,486 ft (453 m)
- Parent peak: Kesler Peak (10,403 ft)
- Isolation: 3.25 mi (5.23 km)
- Coordinates: 40°40′15″N 111°40′58″W

Naming
- Etymology: Gobbler

Geography
- Location within Utah Location within the United States
- Location: Mount Olympus Wilderness
- Country: United States of America
- State: Utah
- County: Salt Lake
- Parent range: Wasatch Range; Rocky Mountains
- Topo map: USGS Mount Aire

Geology
- Rock age: Pennsylvanian
- Rock type: Round Valley Limestone

Climbing
- Easiest route: class 1 hiking

Gobblers Knob is a 10,246-foot elevation (3,123 m) mountain summit located in Salt Lake County, Utah, United States.

== Description ==
Gobblers Knob is the highest point in the Mount Olympus Wilderness, and is set on land managed by Wasatch National Forest. This peak is situated in the Wasatch Range which is a subset of the Rocky Mountains, and with Salt Lake City 12 miles to the west and Park City 10 miles to the east, it is a popular hiking destination. Neighbors include Mount Raymond 1.5 mile to the southwest and Kesler Peak is 3.2 miles to the south. Precipitation runoff from the mountain's north slope drains to Mill Creek, whereas the south slope drains to Big Cottonwood Creek. Topographic relief is significant as the summit rises 3,240 feet (990 meters) above Mill Creek Canyon in 1.5 mile.

== History ==
This mountain's toponym was officially adopted in 1964 by the United States Board on Geographic Names. The landform's name "gobbler" refers to turkeys which miners of the Big Cottonwood Mining District tried raising when their mining income ceased, but this also failed as bobcats ate the turkeys. In 1904, the Baker mine on the northwest slope produced gold ore and copper.

== Climate ==
Climate data for Gobblers Knob 40.6692 N, 111.6830 W, Elevation: 9,760 ft (2,975 m) (1991–2020 normals)
Month	Jan	Feb	Mar	Apr	May	Jun	Jul	Aug	Sep	Oct	Nov	Dec	Year
Mean daily maximum °F (°C)	29.4 (−1.4)	29.6 (−1.3)	35.2 (1.8)	40.4 (4.7)	50.0 (10.0)	61.7 (16.5)	71.0 (21.7)	69.5 (20.8)	60.3 (15.7)	47.2 (8.4)	35.7 (2.1)	29.0 (−1.7)	46.6 (8.1)
Daily mean °F (°C)	21.0 (−6.1)	20.5 (−6.4)	25.5 (−3.6)	30.4 (−0.9)	39.6 (4.2)	50.4 (10.2)	59.6 (15.3)	58.7 (14.8)	50.0 (10.0)	38.0 (3.3)	27.2 (−2.7)	20.6 (−6.3)	36.8 (2.6)
Mean daily minimum °F (°C)	12.6 (−10.8)	11.4 (−11.4)	15.8 (−9.0)	20.3 (−6.5)	29.1 (−1.6)	39.0 (3.9)	48.1 (8.9)	48.0 (8.9)	39.7 (4.3)	28.7 (−1.8)	18.7 (−7.4)	12.3 (−10.9)	27.0 (−2.8)
Average precipitation inches (mm)	5.36 (136)	4.64 (118)	4.69 (119)	5.10 (130)	3.67 (93)	1.91 (49)	0.96 (24)	1.36 (35)	2.25 (57)	3.24 (82)	4.24 (108)	4.83 (123)	42.25 (1,074)
Source: PRISM Climate Group

== Gallery ==
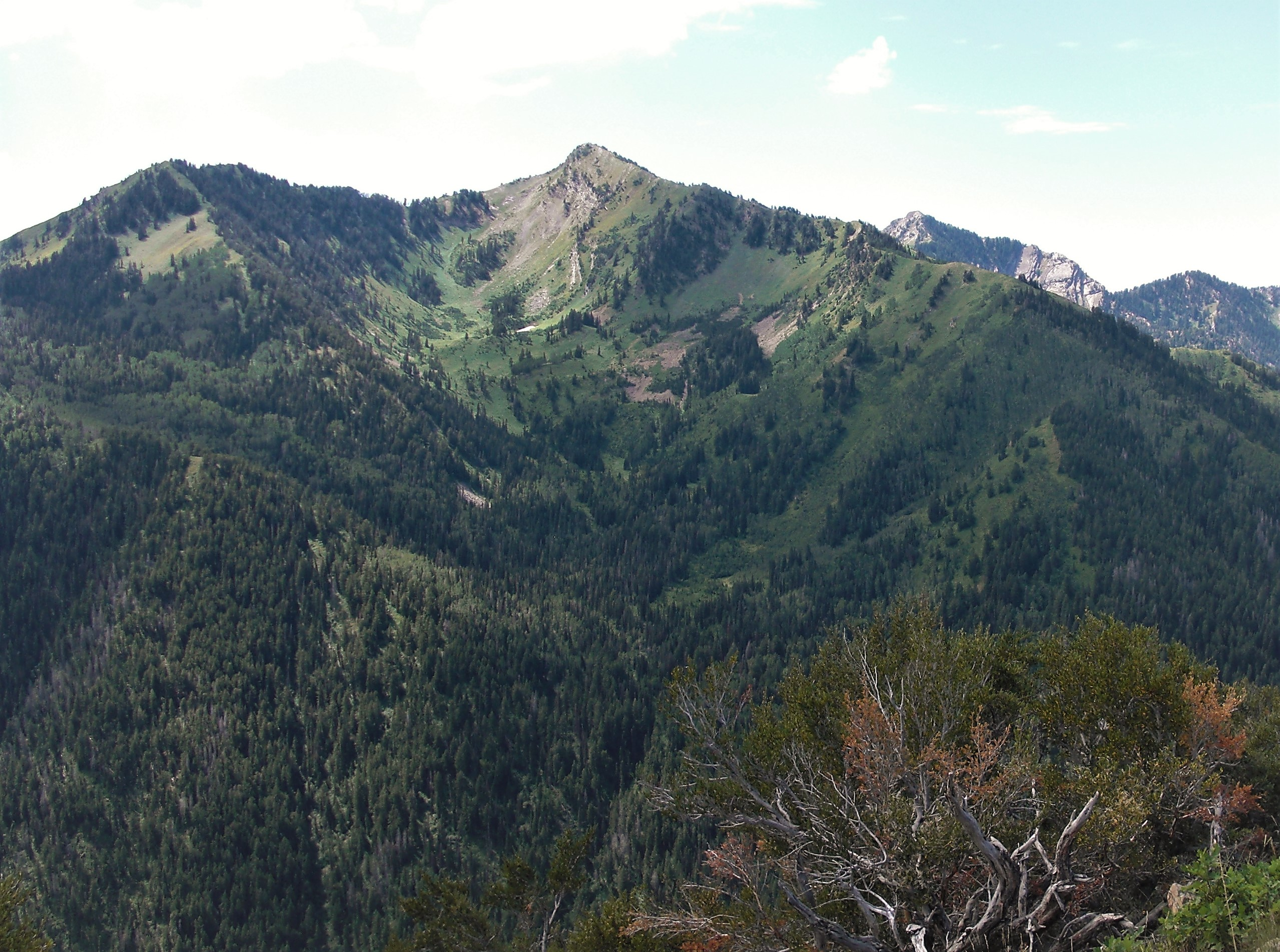
Northeast aspect

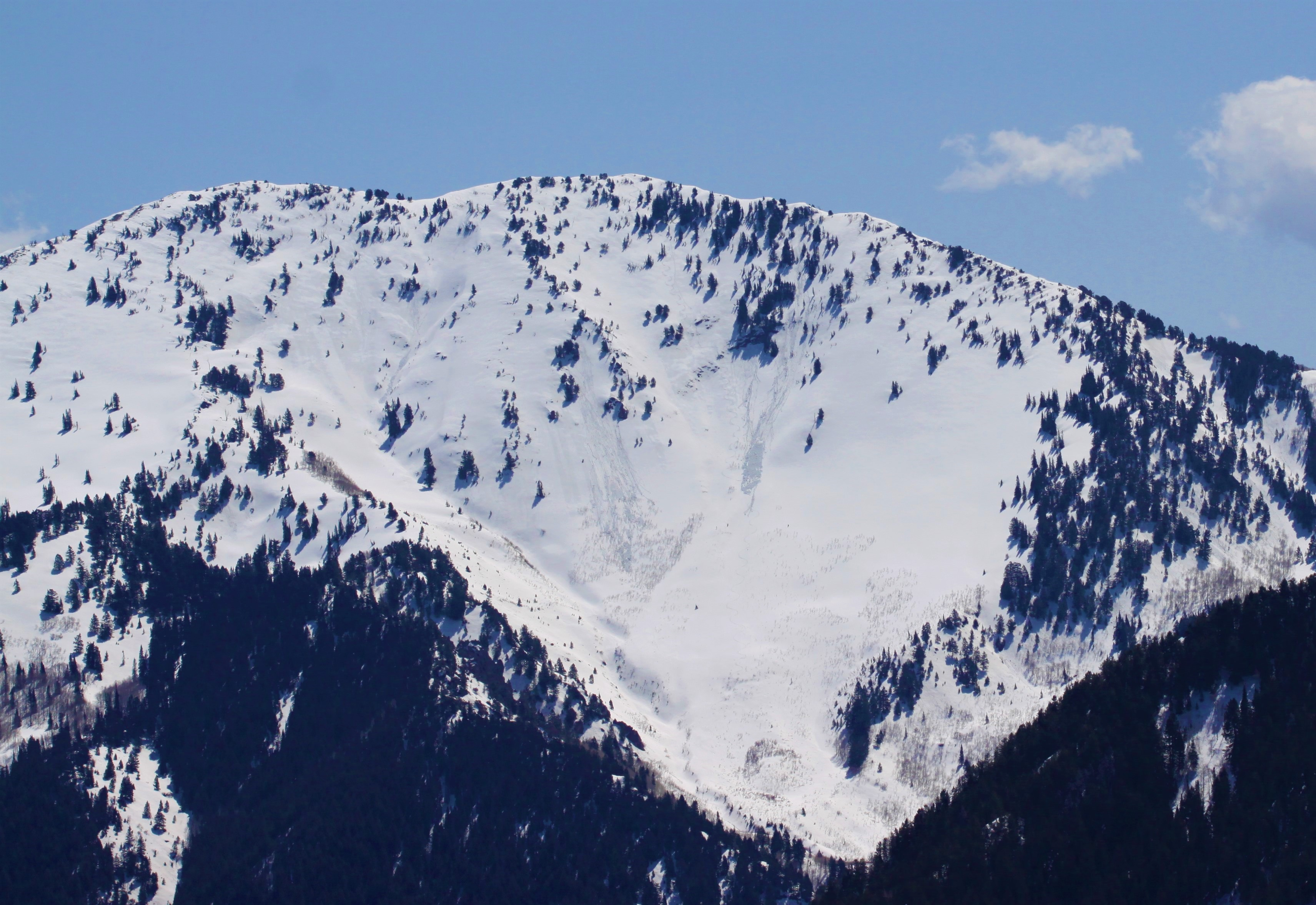
Northwest aspect

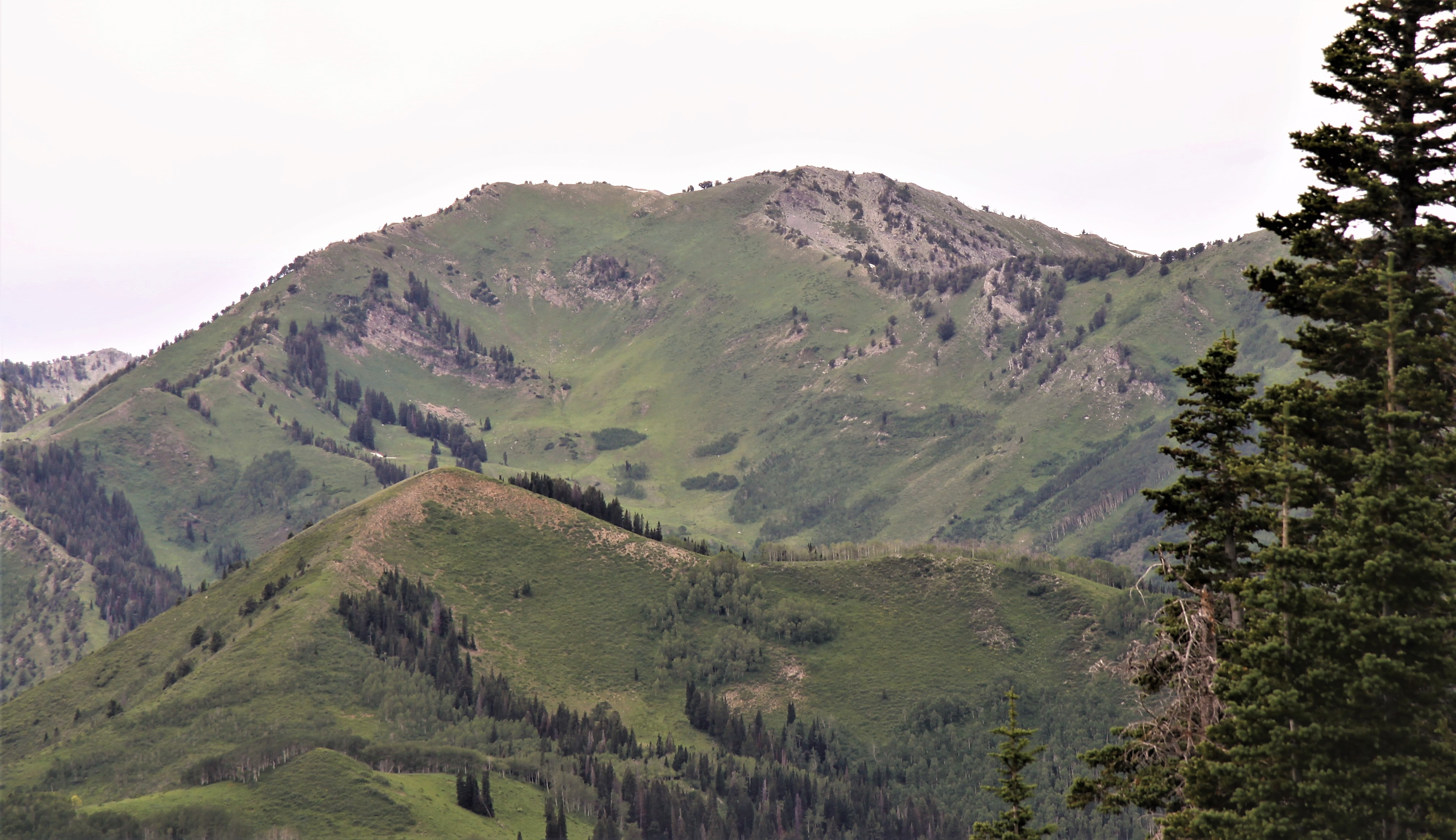
Southeast aspect

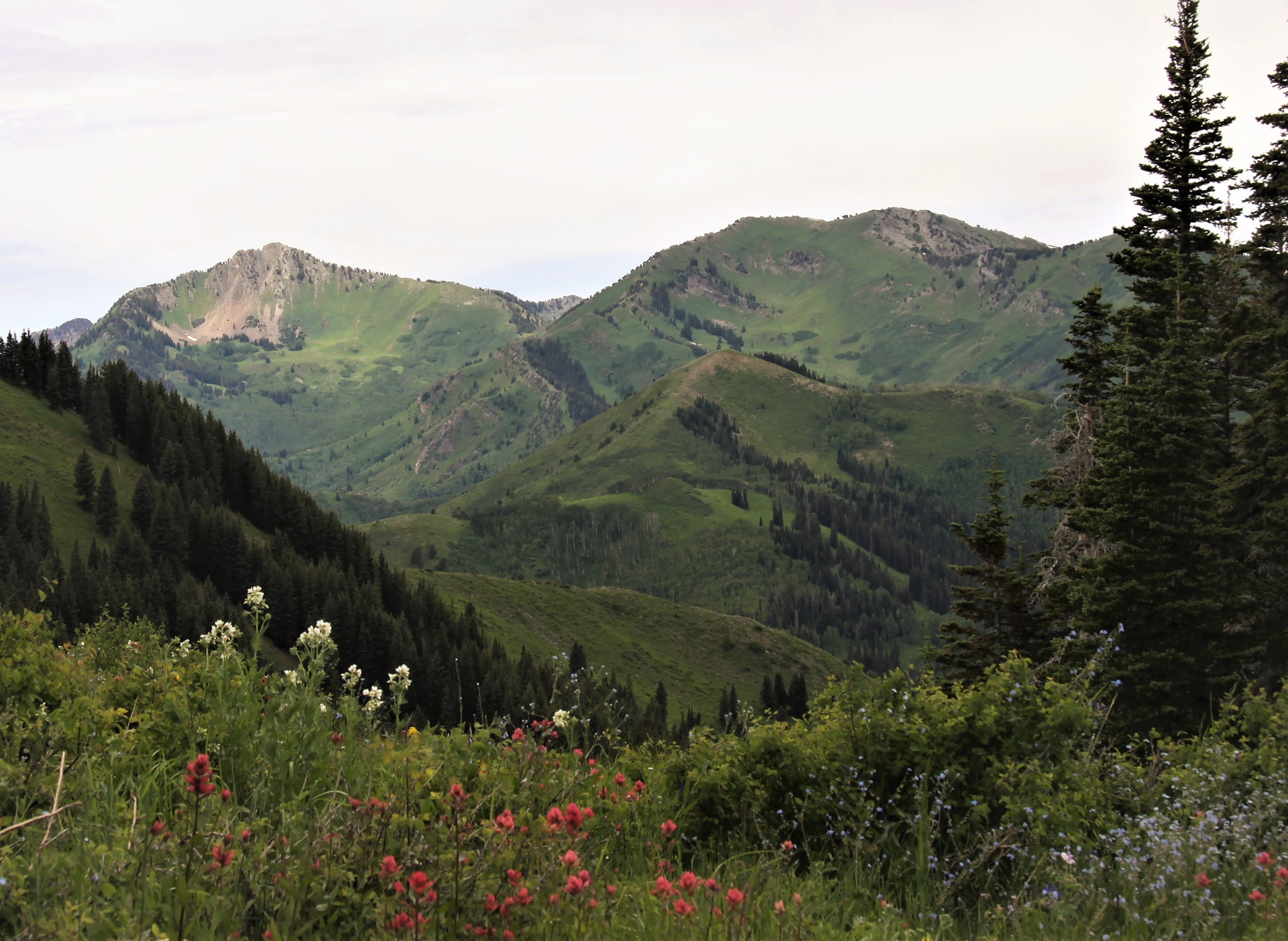
Mount Raymond (left) and Gobblers Knob (right) from southeast

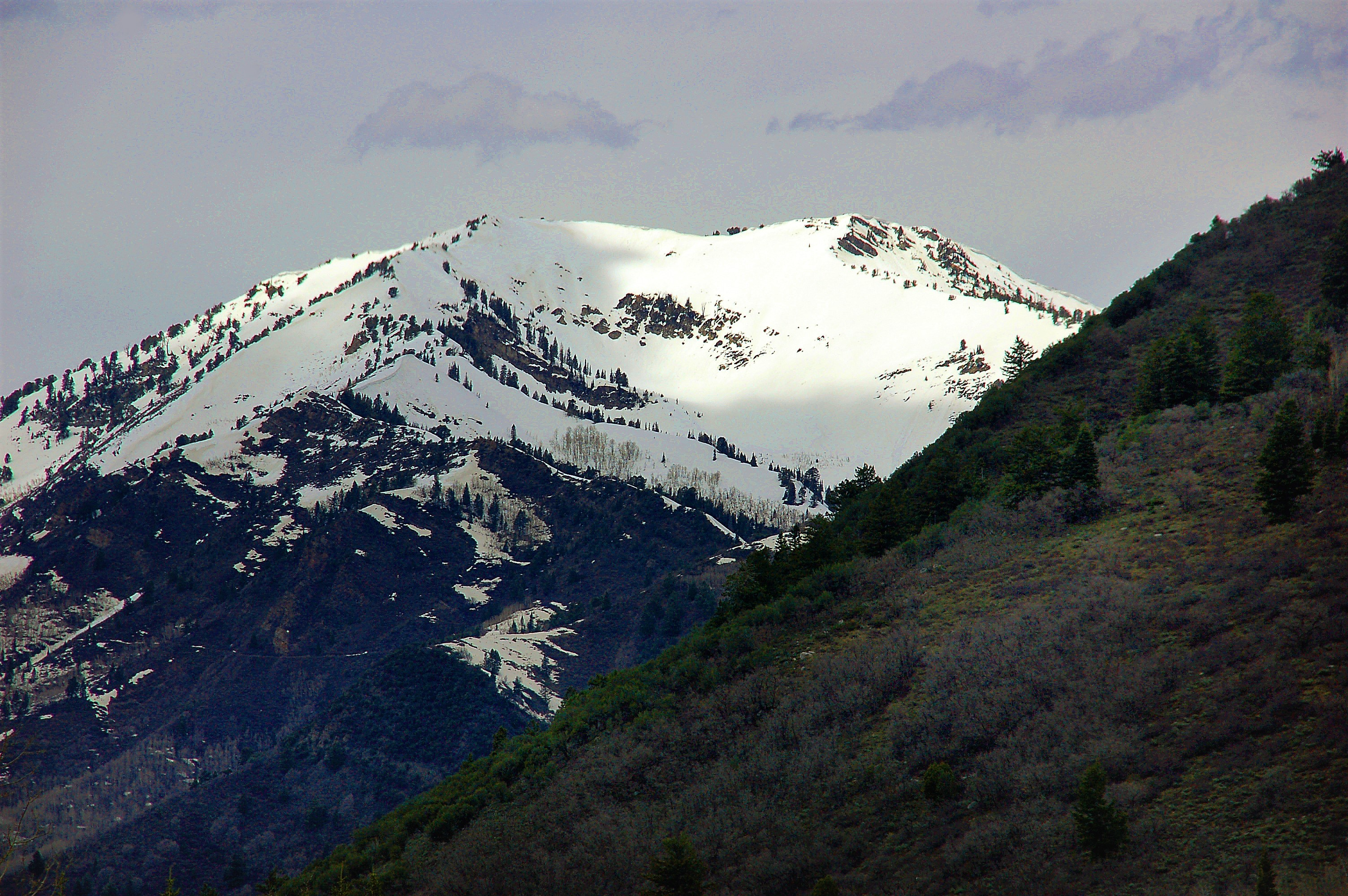
Southeast aspect of Gobblers Knob seen from Big Cottonwood Canyon
