= List of waterfalls in Utah =

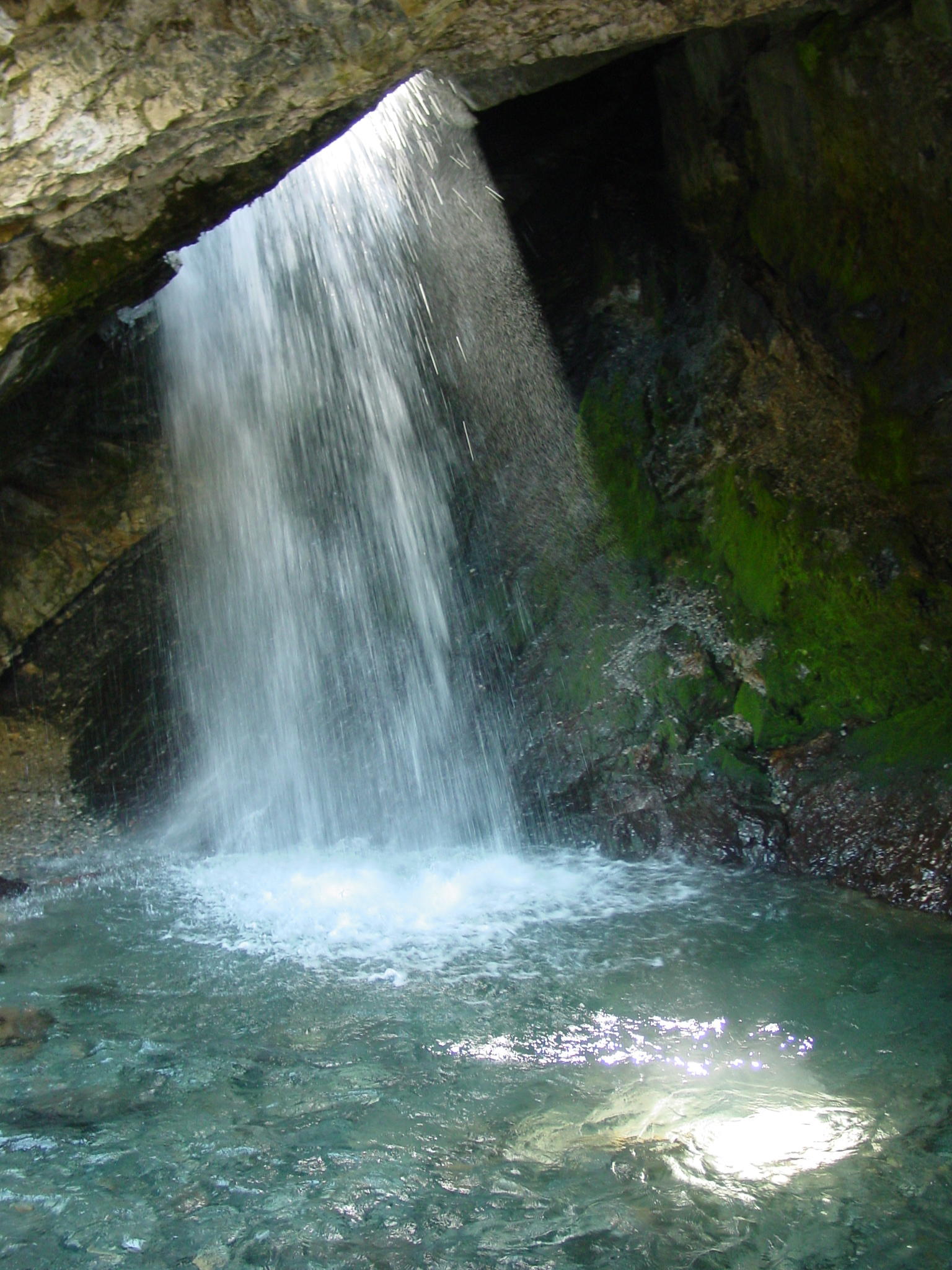
Doughnut Falls in the Wasatch National Forest

There are at least 75 waterfalls in the U.S. state of Utah.

name	elevation	coordinate	USGS Map	GNIS ID
Ashley Falls	6,047 ft (1,843 m)	40°22′2.5″N 111°41′34.3″W		1438420
Battle Creek Falls	4,600 ft (1,400 m)	38°24′34.9″N 112°20′18.7″W	Mount Brigham	1439306
Bullion Falls	8,123 ft (2,476 m)	38°24′34.9″N 112°20′18.7″W	Mount Brigham	1439306
Bridal Veil Falls	5,899 ft (1,798 m)	40°20′16″N 111°36′03″W	Bridal Veil Falls	1439092
Calf Creek Falls	5,545 ft (1,690 m)	37°49′45″N 111°25′12″W	Calf Creek	1429974
Chandler Falls	4,373 ft (1,333 m)	39°28′14″N 110°1′20″W	Chandler Falls	1435293
Double Falls	4,790 ft (1,460 m)	37°16′50″N 113°1′29″W	The Guardian Angels	1435441
Doughnut Falls	7,894 ft (2,406 m)	40°37′47″N 111°39′17″W	Mount Aire	1440533
Funnel Falls	4,219 ft (1,286 m)	38°59′37″N 109°8′52″W	Big Triangle	1435569
Hidden Falls	6,329 ft (1,929 m)	40°38′7″N 111°43′25″W	Mount Aire	1441738
Lisa Falls	6,529 ft (1,990 m)	40°34′22″N 111°43′40″W	Dromedary Peak	1435866
Lower Calf Creek Falls	5,545 ft (1,690 m)	37°49′45″N 111°25′12″W	Calf Creek	1429974
Lower Jump	4,606 ft (1,404 m)	38°11′38″N 109°47′30″W	The Loop	1454625
Marys Veil			Bouillon Canyon	1448647
Merkley Drop	6,204 ft (1,891 m)	40°29′00″N 109°54′00″W	Whiterocks	1430231
Milky Falls	8,422 ft (2,567 m)	39°14′36″N 111°31′18″W	Black Mountain	1443395
Pilling's Cascade			Bouillon Canyon	1448831
Provo River Falls	9,311 ft (2,838 m)	40°39′24″N 110°56′44″W	Mirror Lake	1444669
Scout Falls	8,150 ft (2,480 m)	40°25′02″N 111°38′24″W	Timpanogos Cave	1445389
Smooth Rock Falls	8,373 ft (2,552 m)	40°36′01″N 110°58′3″W	Iron Mine Mountain	1432580
Stewarts Cascades	7,216 ft (2,199 m)	40°23′11″N 111°36′14″W	Aspen Grove	1446145
The Thumb Pour Off	5,554 ft (1,693 m)	37°27′26″N 110°1′12″W	Pollys Pasture	1436493
Upper Calf Creek Falls	5,942 ft (1,811 m)	37°51′18″N 111°27′07″W	Calf Creek	1433800
Upper Jump	5,620 ft (1,710 m)	38°2′30″N 109°45′52″W	Druid Arch	1433800

== See also ==
- List of waterfalls
