= Frederick Kesler =

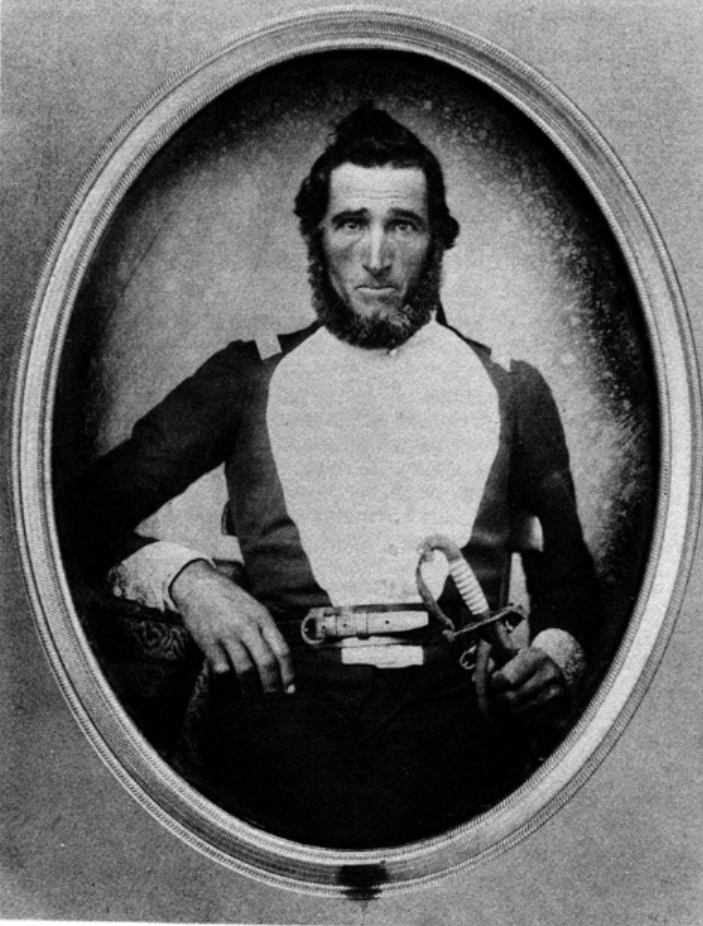
Frederick Kesler was a major in the Nauvoo Legion

Frederick Kesler (1816–1899) was an early member of the Church of Jesus Christ of Latter-day Saints, Born in Meadville, Crawford Co., Pennsylvania. Son of Frederick Kesler and Mary Lindsay. He married Jane Elizabeth Pratt (October 27, 1837 – November 23, 1912). He was baptized in 1835. Kesler was a bodyguard of Joseph Smith, served as a major in the militia corps of the Great Salt Lake Military District, was a justice of the peace, and director of the penitentiary. He was also a bishop for many years, major in the Nauvoo Legion, mill builder, and an associate of Brigham Young from Nauvoo.

== See also ==
- Pratt family
- Kesler Peak
