= Doughnut Falls =

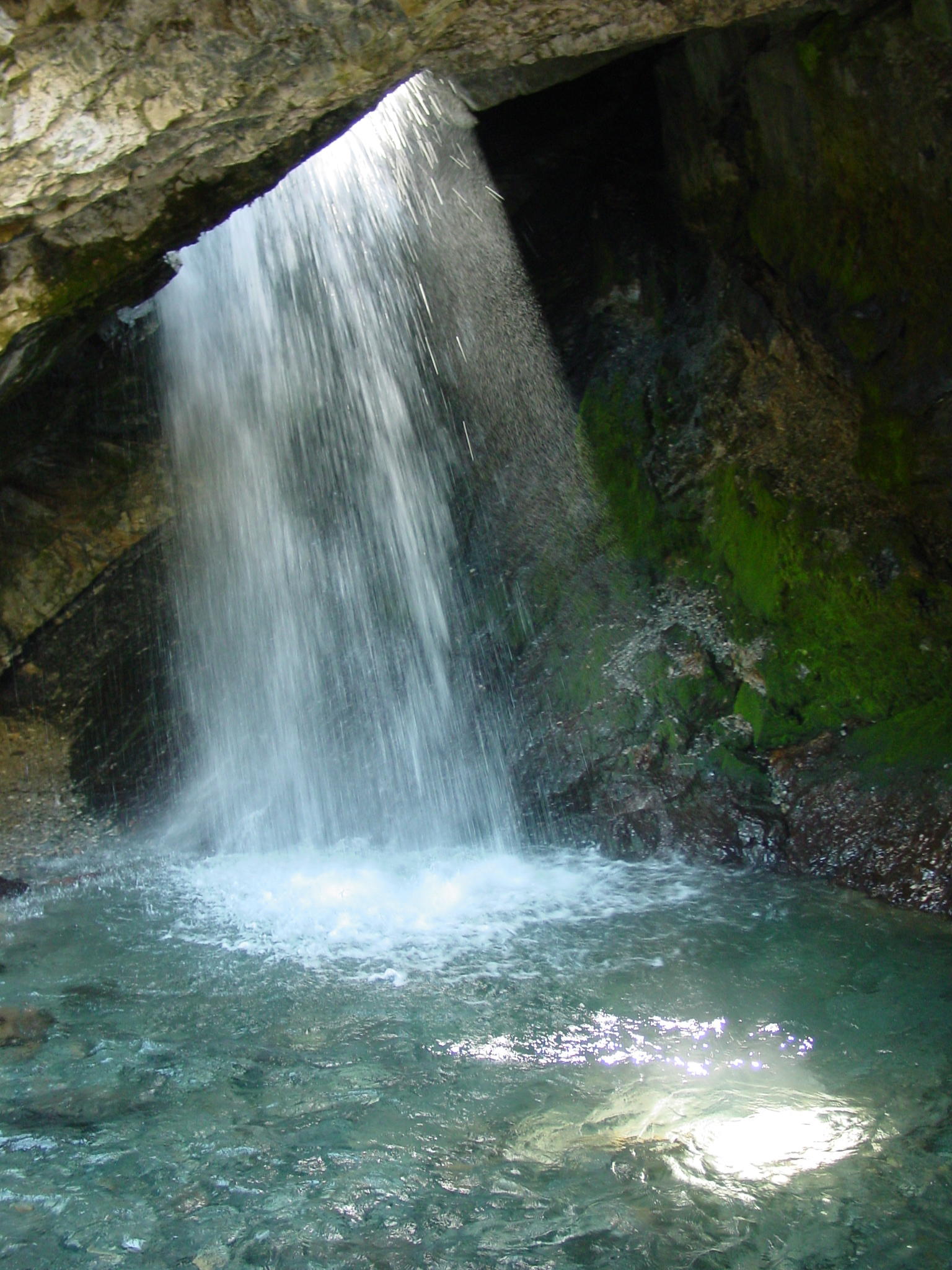
- Main waterfall and pool
- Interactive map of Doughnut Falls
- Location: Big Cottonwood Canyon
- Coordinates: 40.62968°N 111.65481°W
- Elevation: 7,942 ft (2,421 m)
- Total height: 20 ft (6 m)

Doughnut Falls (also known as Donut Falls) is a waterfall in the Big Cottonwood Canyon near Silver Fork, south of Midvale in Salt Lake County, Utah. Access to Doughnut Falls is from the Mill D Trailhead towards the Jordan Pines picnic area. The waterfall plunges into a pothole that has access under the arch of rock with a view up at the falls falling into the pool.

== Trail ==
The Doughnut Falls trail is one of the shortest waterfall trails in northern Utah. In the winter, you need to take an alternative path to reach the often frozen waterfall, which can take up to 3.5 miles round trip, but in Summer the hike is about 1.5 miles long round trip, if you can find a parking spot. After hiking, you will need to climb up a waterfall to reach the Doughnut Falls cave.

== See also ==
- List of waterfalls in Utah
