= Mount Olympus (Utah) =

Mountain in the Wasatch Range in Salt Lake County, Utah, United States

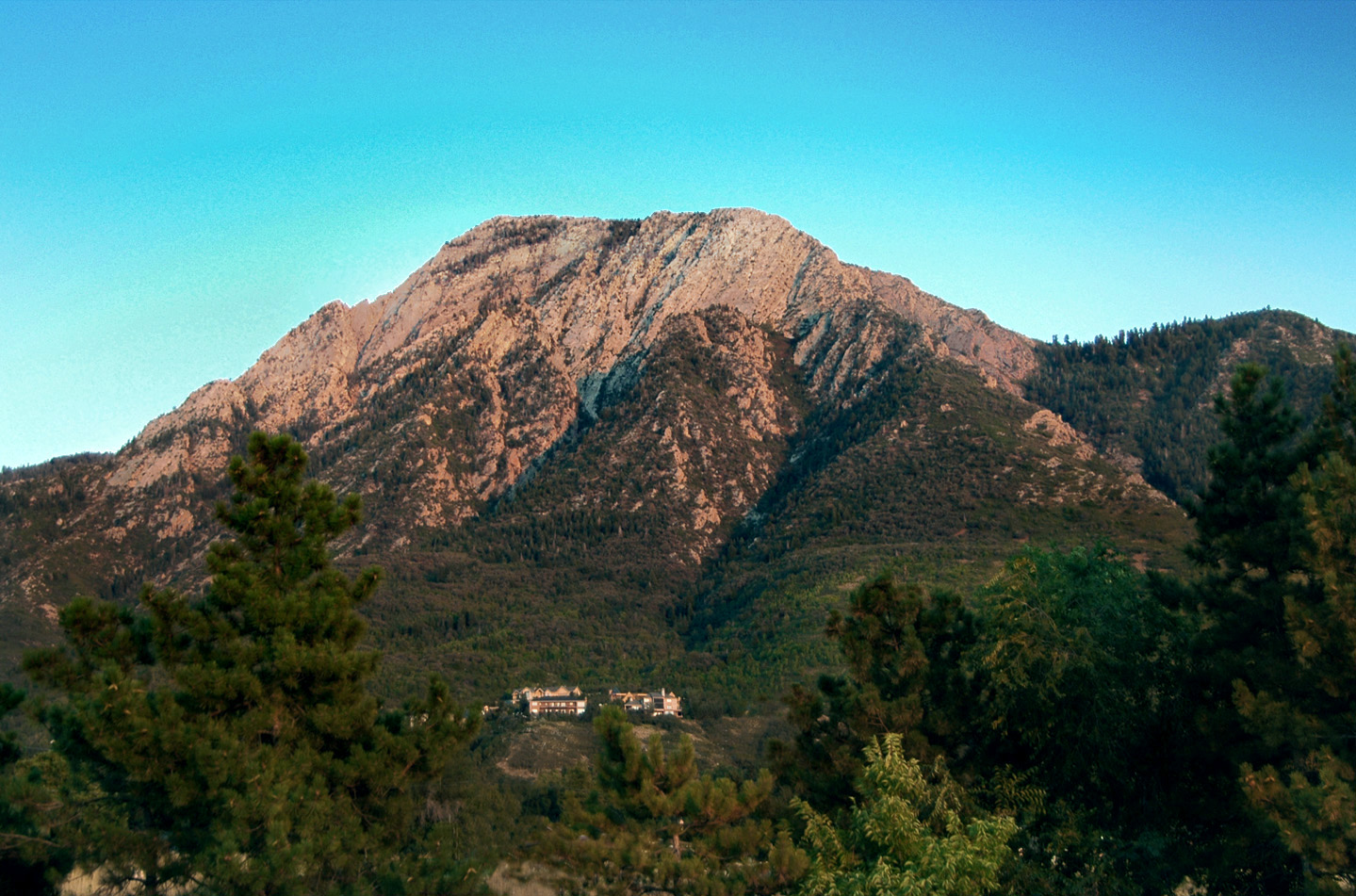

Highest point
- Elevation: 9,030 feet (2,752 m) NAVD 88
- Prominence: 386 ft (118 m)
- Coordinates: 40°39′24″N 111°46′16″W

Geography
- Location within Utah
- Location: Salt Lake County, Utah, U.S.
- Parent range: Wasatch Range
- Topo map: USGS Sugar House

Climbing
- Easiest route: Mount Olympus Trail: Hike

Mount Olympus in the U.S. state of Utah is one of the most prominent and recognizable mountains visible from practically every location in the Salt Lake Valley. Mount Olympus is not the tallest peak along the Wasatch Front, but its unusual form and location make it a popular hiking destination for locals. The mountain is situated east of the center of the Salt Lake Valley, directly east of Holladay. Distinctive features of the mountain are its twin peaks and other outcroppings, the highest of which is called "Summit Peak" and which towers above the valley to an elevation of 9,030 feet (2,752 m). Thus, the peak looms about 4,800 feet (1,463 m) above the valley floor.

== Hiking ==
Because of its proximity, visibility, and accessibility to a large metropolitan area, Mount Olympus has been a popular hiking destination for the residents of the Salt Lake Valley for many years. Most hikers reach the summit via the Mount Olympus Trail, which is a steep hike from the mountain base and stretches approximately 3.1 miles (5.0 km) to the summit. The last 600 vertical feet of terrain to the summit involve several short semi-technical scrambles that often cause problems for hikers, especially on the descent and have led to the need for numerous rescues.

This peak is also a popular winter hiking route because the terrain is not as avalanche prone as many of the surrounding peaks. Due to the trail's elevation and tree density, it remains snow-covered until May, and early spring hiking is best aided by snowshoes. Hiding near the base of Mount Olympus lies Utah's second deepest, and the United States' 13th deepest cave, known as Neffs Cave.

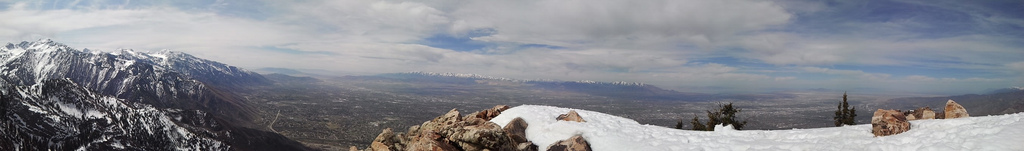
Mount Olympus (Utah) panorama

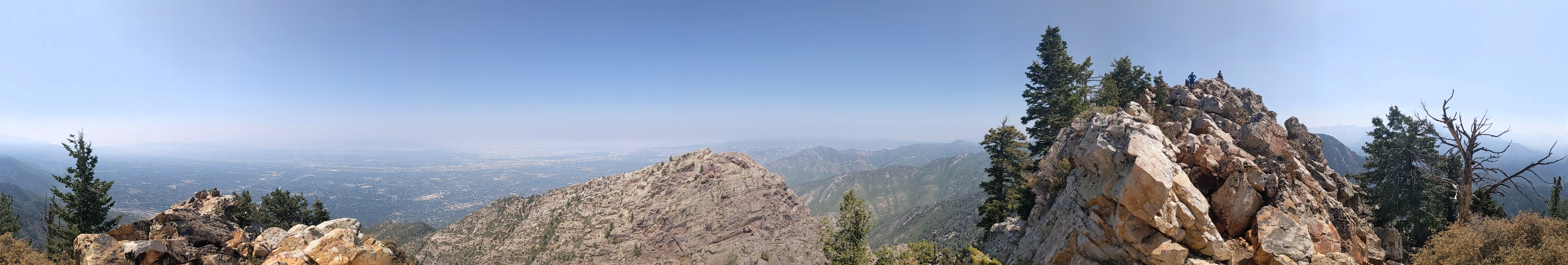
The peak of Mt. Olympus is the highest terrain point in this photo.

== See also ==
- List of Mountains in Utah
- Wasatch-Cache National Forest
