= John Francis Dillon =

John Francis Dillon may refer to:

- John Francis Dillon (commissioner) (1866–1927), one of the first members of the Federal Radio Commission in the United States
- John Francis Dillon (director) (1884–1934), American film director and actor
