= Lenore Romney =

American actress and political figure (1908–1998)

- Romney in a Senate campaign ad, c. 1970

First Lady of Michigan
- In role January 1, 1963 – January 22, 1969
- Governor: George Romney
- Preceded by: Alice Swainson
- Succeeded by: Helen Milliken

Personal details
- Born: Lenore Lafount (Note: During his lifetime, Lenore's father Harold Arundel Lafount's name was almost always spelled as such, as was his father's. Lenore used LaFount, however (possibly as part of her acting aspirations), and subsequent biographers of George Romney sometimes referred to Harold with her spelling.); November 9, 1908 Logan, Utah, U.S.
- Died: July 7, 1998 (aged 89) Royal Oak, Michigan, U.S.
- Party: Republican
- Spouse: George Romney (m. 1931; died 1995)
- Children: 4, including Mitt
- Parent: Harold A. Lafount (father)
- Relatives: Romney family
- Education: University of Utah (attended); George Washington University (BA); American Laboratory Theatre (GrDip)

Lenore LaFount Romney (née Lafount; November 9, 1908 – July 7, 1998) was an American actress and political figure. The wife of businessman and politician George W. Romney, she was First Lady of Michigan from 1963 to 1969. She was the Republican Party nominee for the U.S. Senate in 1970 from Michigan. Her younger son, Mitt Romney, was a U.S. senator from Utah, a former governor of Massachusetts, and was the 2012 Republican presidential nominee.

Lenore LaFount was born in Logan, Utah, and raised in Salt Lake City. She went to Latter-day Saints High School, where she developed an interest in drama and first met George Romney. She attended the University of Utah and George Washington University, graduating from the latter in 1929. She studied acting at the American Laboratory Theatre in New York, then went to Hollywood, where she became a bit player who appeared in a number of films with Metro-Goldwyn-Mayer. Turning down a contract offer with them, she married George Romney in 1931. The couple had four children together; she was a stay-at-home mother, eventually living in Bloomfield Hills, Michigan, while he became a success in business and politics.

Lenore Romney was a popular first lady of Michigan, and was a frequent speaker at events and before civic groups. She was involved with many charitable, volunteer, and cultural organizations, including high positions with the Muscular Dystrophy Association, YWCA, and American Field Services, and also was active in the Church of Jesus Christ of Latter-day Saints, of which she was a life-long member. She was an asset to her husband's 1968 presidential campaign. Although a traditionalist, she was an advocate for the greater involvement of women in business and politics.

In 1970, she was urged by her husband and state Republican Party officials to run against popular, two-term Democratic incumbent Senator Philip Hart. However, she struggled to establish herself as a serious candidate, apart from her husband, and failed to capture the support of conservatives within the party, only narrowly defeating State Senator Robert J. Huber in the party primary. Her difficulties continued in the general election, and she lost to Hart by a two-to-one margin. She returned to volunteer activities during the 1970s, including stints on the boards of the National Center for Voluntary Action and the National Conference of Christians and Jews, and gave speeches to various organizations.

== Early life and education ==
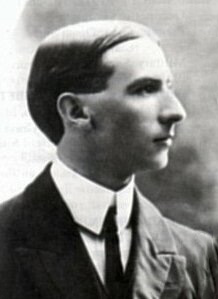
Harold Arundel Lafount
(1880–1952)

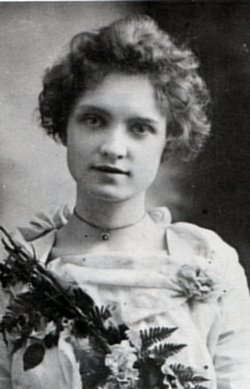
Alma Luella Robison
(1882–1938)

Lenore LaFount was born on November 9, 1908, in Logan, Utah, the second of four daughters of Alma Luella (née Robison; 1882–1938) and Harold Arundel Lafount (1880–1952). Her father was born in Birmingham in England, and her mother, born in Montpelier, Idaho, was of colonial English ancestry (with more distant French roots). She had three sisters, one older and two younger. The family belonged to the Church of Jesus Christ of Latter-day Saints; her father had converted to it in England and then came to the U.S., while her maternal grandmother, Rosetta Berry, had been one of the Mormon handcart pioneers. Her father worked as a headphone manufacturer while her mother was prominent in local charities.

Lenore was raised in Salt Lake City, in a house located at Fifteenth South and Ninth East. She played the ukulele and was a member of the LDS girls club The Seagulls. She attended Latter-day Saints High School, where she had a strong interest in drama. In 1924, during her junior year, she and senior George W. Romney became high-school sweethearts. She was from a more assimilated Mormon family than his, which had struggled with financial failure and debt. Although she was a "reach" for him in terms of social standing, he pursued her relentlessly from that point on, studying at a nearby junior college while she was a senior.

She graduated from high school in 1926 after only three years and attended the University of Utah for two years, while George went to England and Scotland to serve as a Mormon missionary (making her "promise never to kiss anybody" while he was away). At the university, she was a member of the Chi Omega sorority. In 1927, she was one of six attractive young women chosen to welcome Charles Lindbergh to Salt Lake City following his historic Spirit of St. Louis flight, and she was featured on the front page of the Salt Lake Telegram as a result. Later that year, on the strength of his friendship with U.S. Senator Reed Smoot, Harold Lafount was appointed by President Calvin Coolidge to serve on the new Federal Radio Commission. The family moved to Washington, D.C., and Lenore transferred to George Washington University, where she graduated with an A.B. degree in English literature in June 1929 after spending only three years total in college. George returned from his missionary stint and soon followed her to Washington.

== Acting career ==
LaFount's mother wanted her to explore a theatrical career before marrying, and an aunt offered her further encouragement and assistance. LaFount thus moved to New York and enrolled in the American Laboratory Theatre to study acting, where she was taught Stanislavski's system under school co-founder Maria Ouspenskaya. She found the experience inspiring. In student productions there, she starred in the Shakespearean roles of Ophelia and Portia and also appeared in roles from Ibsen and Chekhov plays. She received a performance award there in 1930. Talent scouts attending the productions were impressed, and she received an offer from the National Broadcasting Company to perform in a series of Shakespeare radio programs and from Metro-Goldwyn-Mayer to go to Hollywood under an apprentice actress contract. She decided on the latter, despite strenuous arguments against doing so from a threatened George, who had been visiting her on weekends. By then, he had a job with Alcoa, and arranged to be transferred to Los Angeles to be with her. In September 1930, the couple became engaged.

A 5-foot-6-inch (1.68 m) slender woman with porcelain skin and naturally curly chesnut colored hair, LaFount earned bit parts in Hollywood. These included appearing as a fashionable young French woman in a Greta Garbo film and as an ingenue in the William Haines film A Tailor Made Man. She also appeared in films that starred Jean Harlow and Ramon Navarro and was a stand-in for Lili Damita. Her trained voice made her valuable during this dawn of the talking pictures era, and she worked as a voice actor in animated cartoons, sometimes doing the parts of speaking cats and dogs. She appeared in a promotional film clip with Buster, MGM's star dog. George's long-time jealousy about her being in contact with other men became even worse as she met stars like Clark Gable, and in reaction to his attempts to control her, she threatened to break off their engagement.

After a few months in Hollywood, she had the opportunity to sign a three-year contract with MGM that was worth $50,000 if all the options were picked up. However, she was dismayed by some of the seamier aspects of Hollywood, including the studio's request that she pose for cheesecake photos and the constant gambling among the extras. She also found the long waits between shots unsatisfying as a thespian, and read Tolstoy and Dostoyevsky novels on the set to pass the time. Romney finally convinced her to go ahead with marriage and return to Washington, where he worked for Alcoa as a lobbyist, earning $125 a month.

Although Lenore had been more independent than many women of the time, she later stated that she "never had any regrets about giving up movies." Another time she said that she had never had a choice of both marriage and an acting career: "In an acting career, I would have been upstaging him, and he couldn't stand that. It was never either and; it was always either or." George would later consider his successful seven-year courtship of her to be his greatest sales achievement.

== Marriage and family ==
Lenore LaFount married George Romney on July 2, 1931, in the Salt Lake Temple. Their wedding reception in the Chi Omega house at the University of Utah was attended by about four hundred guests.

In Washington, Lenore's cultural refinement and hosting skills, along with her father's social and political connections, helped George in his business career, and the couple met the Hoovers, the Roosevelts, and other prominent Washington figures. George often called upon her to host short-notice parties. During 1933–1934, Lenore hosted a 15-minute weekly program, Poetical Hitchhiking, on Washington's famed radio station WRC where she selected and read the poems. (The staff announcer who introduced her was Arthur Godfrey.) She also directed student plays at George Washington University.

The couple's first child, Margo Lynn (known as Lynn) was born in 1935 after a difficult childbirth, and Lenore became a stay-at-home mother. A second daughter, Jane, followed in 1938. In 1939, the family moved to the Detroit, Michigan, area when George took a job with the Automobile Manufacturers Association. They rented a house in Grosse Pointe, Michigan, for two years, then bought one in the Palmer Woods section of Detroit. The couple's first son, George Scott (known as G. Scott), was born in 1941. The couple longed for another child, but doctors told them that Lenore probably could not become pregnant again and might not survive if she did. By 1946, they had begun the process of adopting a war orphan living in Switzerland. However, Lenore became pregnant, and after a difficult pregnancy – lying still on her back for a month in a hospital during one stretch – and delivery, Willard Mitt (known as Mitt) was born in 1947. After the birth she required a hysterectomy. Lenore would subsequently refer to Mitt as her miracle baby.

The family moved to affluent Bloomfield Hills, Michigan, around 1953. In 1953, Lenore suffered another health crisis when a blood transfusion of the wrong type put her life in danger, but she recovered. In 1954, George was named president and chairman of American Motors Corporation. During this time a bad attack of bursitis left her with no movement in her left arm for five years, and the rest of the family took up her chores. The couple spent summers at a cottage on the Canadian shore of Lake Huron. A slipped disk suffered there gave her further trouble, and that and the bursitis caused her to switch from golf to swimming as her main exercise.

The couple's marriage reflected aspects of their personalities and courtship. George was devoted to Lenore, and tried to bring her a flower every day, often a single rose with a love note. George was also a strong, blunt personality used to winning arguments by force of will, but the more self-controlled Lenore was unintimidated and willing to push back against him. The couple quarreled often, so much that their grandchildren would later nickname them "the Bickersons" (there being a classic radio show of that name). In the end, their closeness would allow them to settle arguments amicably, often by her finally accepting what he wanted. She still had a restive nature; Mitt later recalled that, "It always seemed that she wanted something a little more for herself." (Mitt himself would later show a more reserved, private, and controlled nature than George's, traits he got from Lenore.)

== First Lady of Michigan ==
When her husband decided to enter electoral politics by running for Governor of Michigan in 1962, Lenore Romney said she and the family supported him: "I know it will be difficult – not easy. But we're all dedicated with him for better government." She played a productive role in the 1962 campaign, making speeches before groups of Republican women at a time when it was unusual for women to campaign separately from their husbands. She was given the task of campaigning in the rural and small urban, Republican-leaning outstate areas while he focused on the Democratic-leaning Detroit area.

Following George's victory in November 1962, Lenore became the state's First Lady. About her new role, she said her goal was to make "a real breakthrough in human relations by bringing people together as people – just like George has enunciated. Women have a very interesting role in this, and I don't expect to be a society leader holding a series of meaningless teas."

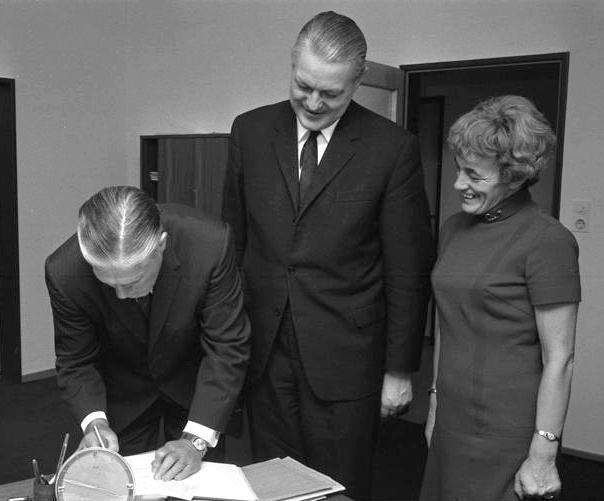
Lenore with her husband George (far left) and West Germany's Gerhard Stoltenberg (center) in 1967

She proved popular as a First Lady. She was a frequent speaker at events and before civic groups and became known for her eloquence. She was thus useful to his political career, just as she had been to his business one. Like her husband, she did not make public appearances on Sundays. He was re-elected in 1964 and 1966, and she campaigned frequently with him. Moreover, she played more of an active and partisan role within her party than any other Michigan first lady in the 20th century. She knew his policy positions at least as well as any of his official aides, went with him on almost all of his out-of-state trips, and gave his speeches for him if sudden events made him unable to attend. Over time an impression grew among some in the public that she was smarter than he was. George Romney biographer T. George Harris concluded in 1967 that "she has been considerably more than a first lady."

Lenore was a traditionalist who decried the women's liberation movement as being one of "strident voices" and "burning bras and railing against male-chauvinistic pigs." She decried relaxed sexual mores and talk of a "New Morality", saying "the morality they discuss is the barnyard morality and it is as old as the hills." However, she was also an advocate for the involvement of women in business and politics. By 1966, she was telling audiences around the state, "Why should women have any less say than men about the great decisions facing our nation?" She added that women "represent a reservoir of public service which has hardly been tapped."

She explicitly criticized the counterculture phrase "Turn on, tune in, drop out", saying "What kind of a philosophy is that?" Instead she urged young people to "Think of something outside of yourselves. Have something in yourself that is greater than self." She told one high school audience, "You have the right to rebel, but make sure what you're rebelling for is greater than what you're rebelling against."

She was a devout and faithful member of The Church of Jesus Christ of Latter-day Saints who taught Sunday School lessons at her church for many years, including a stint during the early 1960s teaching 14-year-olds. Her views on many social issues were more liberal than most of the Republican Party, and she appeared on stage with Martin Luther King Jr. at Michigan State University on March 9, 1966, when King gave his "Chicago Wall" speech. On the issue of the LDS Church policy of the time that did not allow black people in its lay clergy, she defended the church, saying, "If my church taught me anything other than that the Negro is equal to any other person, I could not accept it." She was a member of the Women's City Club in Detroit, but in 1967, said she would resign unless the club dropped a policy barring black guests from eating in its dining room.

During her husband's 1968 presidential campaign, Lenore continued to exert a calming influence on him and helped keep his sometimes problematic temper in check. She was adept at campaigning, appearing at ease and speaking in a lively, fluent manner without notes before audiences of various types. The Associated Press wrote that she was probably "the most indefatigable campaigner on the New Hampshire primary circuit, including the candidates". The New York Times wrote, "To see Mrs. George Romney in action is to watch an authentic, stand-up evangelist weave a spell. ... in the view of seasoned politicians, Lenore Romney is a far more effective speaker than the wife of any national candidate in recent memory. She may even be among the select group of political wives who win votes for their husbands through their own speeches and contacts." As the campaign went on, George fell far behind Republican rival Richard Nixon in polls and withdrew in February 1968 before the first primaries took place.

Lenore continued to have health difficulties, visiting medical centers around the country but unable to get a clear diagnosis. One specialist attributed her problems to a failure to absorb sufficient calcium, for which she was given once-a-week shots. She was found to have several food allergies and spent time at Chicago's Swedish Covenant Hospital in 1967. She suffered an injury outside her house around 1967 and another the next year when she fell and suffered a shoulder dislocation that turned into bursitis. During October 1968 she was hospitalized at Barnes-Jewish Hospital in St. Louis, seeing a bone and mineral specialist.

Lenore Romney worked on behalf of many volunteer organizations over a number of years. In 1963, she was co-chair of the Muscular Dystrophy Association. Starting in 1965, she was a member of a special committee of the American Mothers Committee. By 1970, she was on the national board of directors of the YWCA and a member of the national advisory board to American Field Services. She had also held high positions with Goodwill Industries, United Community Services, Child Guidance Study, Association for Retarded Children, Michigan Association for Emotionally Disturbed Children, and the Michigan Historical Society. She worked with Project HOPE. She was chair of the Detroit Grand Opera Association and was active with the Women's Association for the Detroit Symphony Orchestra. The Boston Globe later characterized her as a "pillar of Detroit society".

== 1970 U.S. Senate campaign ==
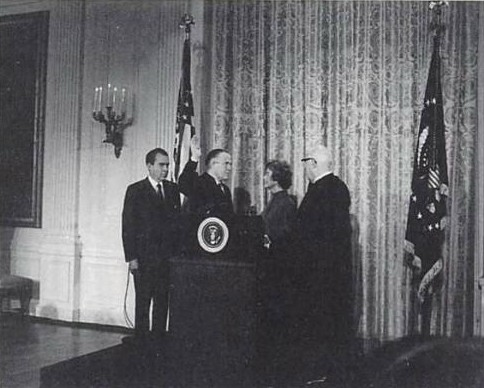
Lenore Romney with George Romney and Richard Nixon, January 22, 1969

After the 1968 presidential election, George Romney was named the U.S. Secretary of Housing and Urban Development in the administration of the newly elected President Nixon. Lenore was not enthusiastic about leaving Michigan to return to Washington after three decades away, but said, "Any wife wants to be with her husband wherever he is, whether state or federal government, just so he can develop his creative ideas." By then, the couple had 12 grandchildren.

For the 1970 U.S. Senate election from Michigan, state Republicans were looking for someone to run against Democrat Philip Hart, a two-term incumbent. Hart was heavily favored to win re-election, but Republicans thought he might be vulnerable on ideological grounds (for being too liberal) and owing to an anti-war protest arrest involving his wife. George Romney's name was mentioned as a possible candidate. Indeed, Nixon, who never had good relations with Romney either personally or on policy grounds, had by then decided he wanted Romney out of his administration but did not want to fire him, and hatched a plot to get Romney to run in the Senate race. However, George came up with the idea of Lenore running, and sprung it on Lenore and the children at the end of 1969. Lenore's name began being mentioned by other Republicans, even though she professed not to want to run unless no other candidate could be found. U.S. House Minority Leader Gerald Ford from Michigan thought she could unite the state party's different factions, but Governor William Milliken, who had succeeded George and was not eager to see more Romneys in power, opposed the notion. And while Lenore had achieved a good reputation for campaigning on her husband's behalf, there were some who suspected that her Senate candidacy was just a stalking horse for keeping George's options open. Such sentiments were exacerbated when George did not completely rule himself out of a possible race.

The state party had a system wherein there would be a series of meetings of its 355 leaders in order to declare a "consensus" candidate that the party would support in any primary election. During the initial February 21, 1970, meeting, Lenore Romney faced opposition from liberal U.S. Representative Donald W. Riegle, Jr. and conservative State Senator Robert J. Huber. The meeting became contentious, and with Milliken helping to block her, in three ballots she was unable to reach the three-fourths majority needed for the consensus nod. On February 23, she formally entered the contest for the Republican nomination for the Senate seat. George successfully pressured Milliken to endorse her, but gained bad publicity when The Detroit News exposed his actions. At the next party meeting, on March 7, she won 92 percent of the leaders and gained the consensus candidate position, and talk of George running ended.

George A. Romero directed her campaign film, Lenore.

Riegle did not continue his run, but Huber did. In the ensuing primary contest, Romney's effort emphasized her sex, saying as a campaign theme, "Never before has the voice and understanding of a concerned woman been more needed." Billboards featuring her face were everywhere, captioned only as "Lenore" and omitting any reference to political party. She was still photogenic, but so thin that she was sometimes described as "frail" or "waiflike", and her husband sometimes worried about her weight. She issued a half-hour campaign film that featured endorsements from many national and state party leaders as well as from celebrities Bob Hope and Art Linkletter, and showcased her family role and her concern for disadvantaged people. Huber, in contrast, emphasized his edge in political experience, derided her "motherly concern", and criticized the "bossism" that he said was trying to force another Romney into statewide office.

Regarding the Vietnam War, Romney called for the withdrawal of all American troops by the end of 1971, and characterized the war as "disastrous". She was troubled by the ongoing Cambodian Incursion and said that if elected she would vote to cut off its funds if Nixon did not abide by his pledge to withdraw from there by the end of the month. On other issues, she sometimes took overly broad stances that appeared to come down on multiple sides. The conservative wing of the party, which had never trusted her husband, had the same reaction to her. The largely male press corps tended to deal with her in a paternalistic way, and she was often identified as "Mrs. George Romney" in stories and photo captions. Initially heavily favored over Huber, her campaign failed to gain momentum and polls showed a close race; in response, she shifted her ads to focus more on her stands on issues. In the August 4, 1970, primary, Lenore Romney won a narrow victory, with 52 percent of the vote compared to Huber's 48 percent.

In the general election, with lost prestige, a divided party, and with her campaign resources partly drained by the primary fight, Romney was behind incumbent Democrat Hart from the beginning. Romney issued position papers and emphasized the themes of dealing with crime and social permissiveness; she also advocated a national healthcare plan and increased attention to environmental damage caused by industry. She never made any personal attacks against Hart. The only woman running for the U.S. Senate that year, she was a tireless campaigner, traveling around the state in a chartered Cessna and making as many as twelve stops a day. Nevertheless, the perception grew that she did not have any vision for what she would do as a senator and was only in the race because she was George Romney's wife. In response, she said at one point, "I'm not a stand-in or a substitute for anyone". Her campaign material continued to just refer to "Lenore". She also was negatively impacted, in both the primary and general election, by fallout from her husband's effort as HUD Secretary to enforce housing integration in Warren, Michigan. Consistently far ahead in polls, Hart staged a low-key campaign with few public appearances; he mostly ignored her and sometimes acted condescendingly towards her in private.

The Romney children campaigned for her, including Mitt, who took student leave to work as a driver and advance man at schools and county fairs during the summer. Together, Lenore and Mitt visited all 83 Michigan counties. George was in Washington most of the time and did not publicly campaign for her until the campaign's final day.

In the November 3, 1970, general election, Hart handily won a third term with 67 percent of the vote to her 33 percent. Romney made an unusual election-night visit to congratulate Hart in person, and in saying "I hope all good things will be his," gave what the victor termed "the most graceful and really moving concession speech I've ever heard."

The campaign and loss left Lenore in emotional pain. In her election night remarks she had said, "I thought [running as a woman] would be an asset. It was disappointing to find that many people closed their minds just because I was a woman." She expounded on this in an article she published the following year in Look magazine, describing the openly dismissive reaction she had gotten from both men and women. She wrote that, "In factories, I encountered men in small groups, laughing, shouting, 'Get in the kitchen. George needs you there. What do you know about politics?'" To a friend she wrote, "[I had no idea] how open and bare and wide my own vulnerability would be ... the body wounds are deep." She told one of her children that she wished she had not run, and concluded that "It's the most humiliating thing I know of to run for office."

== Later years ==
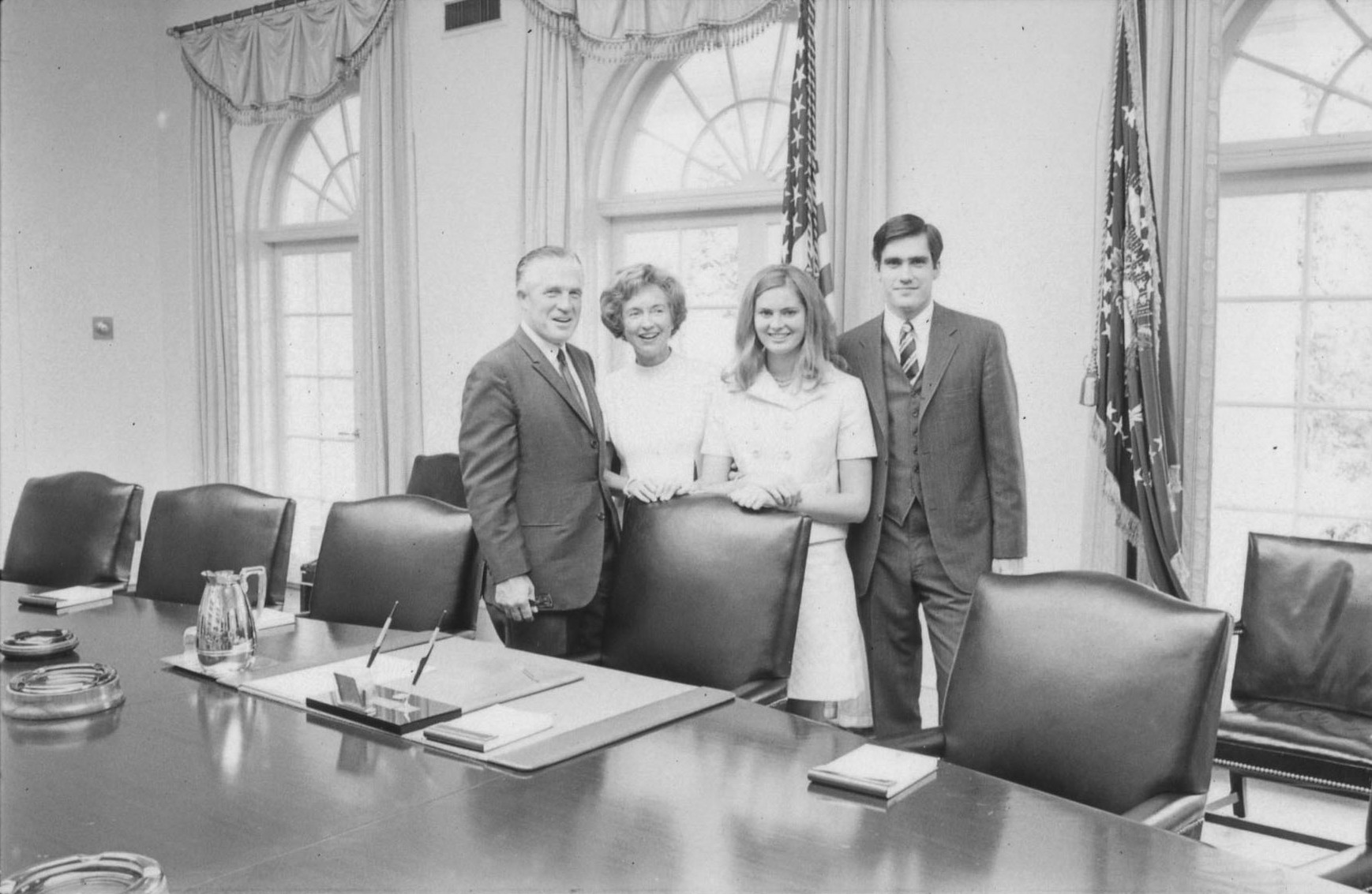
George and Lenore Romney in the Cabinet Room at the White House in July 1969, along with son Mitt and daughter-in-law Ann Romney

Following the campaign, Lenore Romney returned to Washington and to being a cabinet wife. George, who had also long been interested in volunteerism, had helped found the National Center for Voluntary Action in 1970, and Lenore was made a member of its executive committee. By late 1971, she assumed some of First Lady Pat Nixon's role as a public advocate for volunteerism, visiting regional volunteer centers with other cabinet and administration wives. She was on the board of the National Conference of Christians and Jews, serving as brotherhood chair during 1970–1971 and as vice chair in 1972. She was also a main force behind the Urban Service Corps, which sought to apply volunteer efforts to the problems of large cities. She worked with the National Women's Political Caucus to promote the electoral candidacies of women, and gave some speeches at colleges. She came out as explicitly anti-abortion. (Abortion was illegal in Michigan in this pre-Roe v. Wade era, and she had previously been ambivalent about expanding legal access to it; in any case, it had not been an issue in the 1970 Senate campaign.)

In the 1972 U.S. presidential election, Lenore Romney worked in the women's surrogate program for the Committee for the Re-Election of the President. Nevertheless, her husband's relationship with Nixon and the administration became even worse and, in August 1972, she wrote a fruitless letter to presidential aide John Ehrlichman urging a change in the "low regard" and poor treatment that the administration showed him.

After George Romney left the administration and politics in January 1973, Lenore continued with volunteerism, as vice president of the National Center for Voluntary Action. In 1974, she became a commentator on the WJR radio show Point of View. Subsequently, she receded from the public political eye, but still remained active. She gave speeches to various local religious and civic organizations in the Midwest, focusing on her faith, the potential of "people power", and the role of women. Regarding the prospective, much-discussed Equal Rights Amendment, she said in 1979 that she supported equal opportunity and equal pay for women, but she opposed the amendment because it was about "destroying love ... I object to the 'me' emphasis [of it] and not the family."

At age 85, Lenore Romney emerged to give interviews during her son Mitt's 1994 campaign for the U.S. Senate seat from Massachusetts. She contrasted Mitt to his opponent, long-time incumbent Senator Ted Kennedy; while Kennedy had been much in the news for his drinking and sexual escapades, Lenore noted that Mitt and wife Ann Romney had waited until marriage to have sex. Mitt lost the race to Kennedy.

On July 26, 1995, George Romney died of a heart attack at the age of 88 while he was exercising on his treadmill at the couple's home in Bloomfield Hills; he was discovered by Lenore (after she went looking for him, not having found her rose for the day), but it was too late to save him. They had been married for 64 years, and the press noted the strength of that marriage.

Lenore's health declined during her final years. But she was still doing fairly well when, at the age of 89, she suffered a stroke at her Bloomfield Hills home. She died several days later at William Beaumont Hospital in Royal Oak, Michigan, on July 7, 1998. Besides her four children, she was survived by 24 grandchildren and 41 great-grandchildren. She is interred in Fairview Cemetery in Brighton, Michigan, in the same family plot as her husband.

Following her death, many state political figures paid tribute to her, including Governor John Engler and his wife Michelle, who called her "Michigan's rose", and Lieutenant Governor Connie Binsfeld, who characterized her as a "beloved role model for our state".

== Awards and honors ==
In 1969, Lenore Romney received the Woman of the Year Award from Brigham Young University. She was named one of the National Top Ten Women News Makers for 1970. She was given the Salvation Army's Humanitarian Award, Michigan State University's Distinguished Citizen Award, and also received recognition from Hadassah and the International Platform Association.

For many years beginning in 1987, the successor organizations to the National Center for Voluntary Action (VOLUNTEER: The National Center, National Volunteer Center, Points of Light Foundation, and Points of Light Foundation & the National Network of Volunteer Centers) have given out an annual Lenore and George W. Romney Citizen Volunteer Award (later retitled the George and Lenore Romney Citizen Volunteer Award).

Lenore Romney was awarded six honorary degrees. She received an L.H.D. from Hillsdale College in 1964, from Hope College in 1967, and from Gwynedd–Mercy College in 1971. She received an LL.D. from Central Michigan University in 1966. She received a Doctor of Humanities degree from Eastern Michigan University in 1968 and from Detroit College of Business in 1970.

== Bibliography ==
- Candee, Marjorie Dent, ed. (1958). Current Biography Yearbook 1958. New York: H. W. Wilson Company. OCLC 145427784.
- Harris, T. George (1967). Romney's Way: A Man and an Idea. Englewood Cliffs, New Jersey: Prentice-Hall. OCLC 437793.
- Jenson, Andrew (1920). Latter-day Saint Biographical Encyclopedia: A Compilation of Biographical Sketches of Prominent Men and Women in the Church of Jesus Christ of Latter-Day Saints: Volume III. Salt Lake City: Arrow Press.
- Kotlowski, Dean J. (2001). Nixon's Civil Rights: Politics, Principle, and Policy. Cambridge, Massachusetts: Harvard University Press. ISBN 0-674-00623-2.
- Kranish, Michael; Helman, Scott (2012). The Real Romney. New York: HarperCollins. ISBN 978-0-06-212327-5.
- Mahoney, Tom (1960). The Story of George Romney: Builder, Salesman, Crusader. New York: Harper & Brothers. OCLC 236830.
- Scott, Ronald B. (2011). Mitt Romney: An Inside Look at the Man and His Politics. Guilford, Connecticut: Lyons Press. ISBN 978-0-7627-7927-7.
- Who's Who of American Women (9th ed.). Marquis Who's Who. 1976. ISBN 0-8379-0409-9.

Honorary titles
Preceded by Alice Swainson	First Lady of Michigan; 1963–1969	Succeeded by Helen Milliken
Party political offices
Preceded by Elly Peterson	Republican nominee for U.S. Senator from Michigan (Class 1); 1970	Succeeded by Marvin Esch
