= List of first ladies and gentlemen of Michigan =

Spouses of governors of the U.S. state of Michigan

First Gentlemen of Michigan
- Seal of the State of Michigan
- Incumbent; Marc P. Mallory since January 1, 2019
- Residence: Governor's Mansion
- Inaugural holder: Emily V. Mason
- Formation: November 3, 1835; 190 years ago

The spouse of the governor of Michigan is given an honorary position, styled as First Lady or First Gentleman of the State of Michigan. First spouses typically fill ceremonial roles, by acting as the official hostess/host. In this role, they often entertain dignitaries and prepare meetings, parties, and dinners. While the role is generally held by the spouse of the governor, if the governor is unmarried, like in the case of Frank Murphy, sometimes a relative, such as a sister, assumes the role.

== First spouses ==
Name	Took office	Left office	Governor	Ref.
Emily V. Mason (Note: Emily V. Mason was the sister of Governor Mason. She served as official hostess until Governor Mason first married on November 1, 1838.)	1835	1838	Stevens T. Mason	
Julia Phelps Mason	1838	1840	Stevens T. Mason	
Juliana Trumbull Woodbridge	1840	1841	William Woodbridge	
Mary Hudun Gordon	1841	1841	James Wright Gordon	
Mary Kidder "Polly" Barry	1842	1846	John S. Barry	
Lucretia Williams Lawrence Felch	1846	1847	Alpheus Felch	
Elizabeth W. Hubbard Greeley	1847	1847	William L. Greenly	
Almira Caldwell Ransom	1848	1850	Epaphroditus Ransom	
Mary Kidder "Polly" Barry	1850	1851	John S. Barry	
Elizabeth Sarah Sabin McClelland	1852	1853	Robert McClelland	
Anna Marilla Ferrand Stewart Parsons	1853	1854	Andrew Parsons	
Mary Warden Bingham	1855	1858	Kinsley S. Bingham	
Angeolina H. Wisner	1859	1860	Moses Wisner	
Sarah Louisa Horton Ford Blair	1861	1864	Austin Blair	
Mary Ann Slocum Crapo	1865	1868	Henry H. Crapo	
Sibyl Lambard Baldwin (Note: Also spelled Sibyle Lombard Baldwin.)	1869	1872	Henry P. Baldwin	
Frances Elizabeth Newberry Bagley	1873	1876	John J. Bagley	
Elizabeth Musgrave Croswell (Note: Elizabeth Musgrave and Charles Croswell married after Croswell was elected governor. At the beginning of his term, Croswell was an unmarried widower.)	1878	1880	Charles Croswell	
Lucy Amelia Peck Jerome	1881	1882	David Jerome	
Harriet Annette Miles Begole	1883	1884	Josiah Begole	
Annette Huldana Squire Henry Alger	1885	1886	Russell A. Alger	
Mary Eliza Brown Thompson Luce	1887	1890	Cyrus G. Luce	
Elizabeth Galloway Winans	1891	1892	Edwin B. Winans	
Lucretia W. Rich	1893	1896	John T. Rich	
Frances A. Gilbert Pingree	1897	1900	Hazen S. Pingree	
Allaseba Morey Phelps Bliss	1901	1904	Aaron T. Bliss	
Martha M. Davis Warner	1905	1910	Fred M. Warner	
Lillian Gertrude Jones Osborn	1911	1912	Chase Osborn	
Helen G. Ferris	1913	1916	Woodbridge N. Ferris	
Mary Charlotte Moore Sleeper	1917	1920	Albert Sleeper	
Vacant (Note: Governor Groesbeck was a bachelor.)	1921	1926	Alex J. Groesbeck	
Helen Adelaide Kelly Green	1927	1930	Fred W. Green	
Clara Hantel Brucker	1931	1932	Wilber M. Brucker	
Mary Josephine White Comstock	1933	1934	William Comstock	
Queena Maud Warner Fitzgerald	1935	1936	Frank Fitzgerald	
Marguerite Murphy Teahan (Note: Marguerite Murphy Teahan was Governor Murphy's sister. She served as his hostess because Governor Murphy was a bachelor.)	1937	1938	Frank Murphy	
Queena Maud Warner Fitzgerald	1939	1939	Frank Fitzgerald	
Zora Della Cooley Dickinson (Note: Zora C. Dickinson died on August 4, 1940, while her husband was still governor, leaving the position of first lady vacant for the rest of his governorship. She is the only First Lady of Michigan to have died in office.)	1939	1940	Luren Dickinson	
Helen Josephine Jossman Van Wagoner	1941	1942	Murray Van Wagoner	
Anne Veronica O'Brien Kelly	1943	1946	Harry Kelly	
Mae Louise Pierson Sigler	1947	1948	Kim Sigler	
Nancy Lace Quirk Williams	1949	1960	G. Mennen Williams	
Alice Nielsen Swainson	1961	1962	John Swainson	
Lenore LaFount Romney	1963	1969	George W. Romney	
Helen Wallbank Milliken	1969	1982	William Milliken	
Paula Lynne Parker Blanchard (Note: Paula L. Blanchard and Governor Blanchard divorced in 1987. Governor Blanchard is the only Michigan governor to divorce while in office.)	1983	1987	James Blanchard	
Janet A. Blanchard (Note: Janet A. Blanchard and Governor Blanchard married on September 2, 1989. Between Governor Blanchard's remarriage, and his divorce with Paula L. Blanchard, the position of first lady was vacant.)	1989	1990	James Blanchard	
Michelle DeMunbrun Engler	1991	2002	John Engler	
Daniel Granholm Mulhern (Note: Daniel G. Mulhern was the first man to take the role of First Spouse of Michigan.)	2003	2010	Jennifer Granholm	
Sue Snyder	2011	2018	Rick Snyder	
Marc P. Mallory	2019	Present	Gretchen Whitmer	

== See also ==
- List of governors of Michigan
