= National Independent Broadcasters =

- Type: Public
- Industry: Media
- Founded: 1939
- Headquarters: United States

The National Independent Broadcasters was an industry trade group representing the interests of for-profit, over-the-air, non-network-affiliated radio broadcasters in the United States.

It was originally created in 1939 as part of the larger National Association of Broadcasters. In 1941, it split off from that organization to become fully independent. It represented some 200 independent radio stations (out of 800 total in the nation) that were not affiliated with any network. Its activity seems to have diminished after 1943.

The president of the National Independent Broadcasters was Harold A. Lafount.

== See also ==
- National Federation of Community Broadcasters
