= Harold A. Lafount =

American businessman (1880–1952)

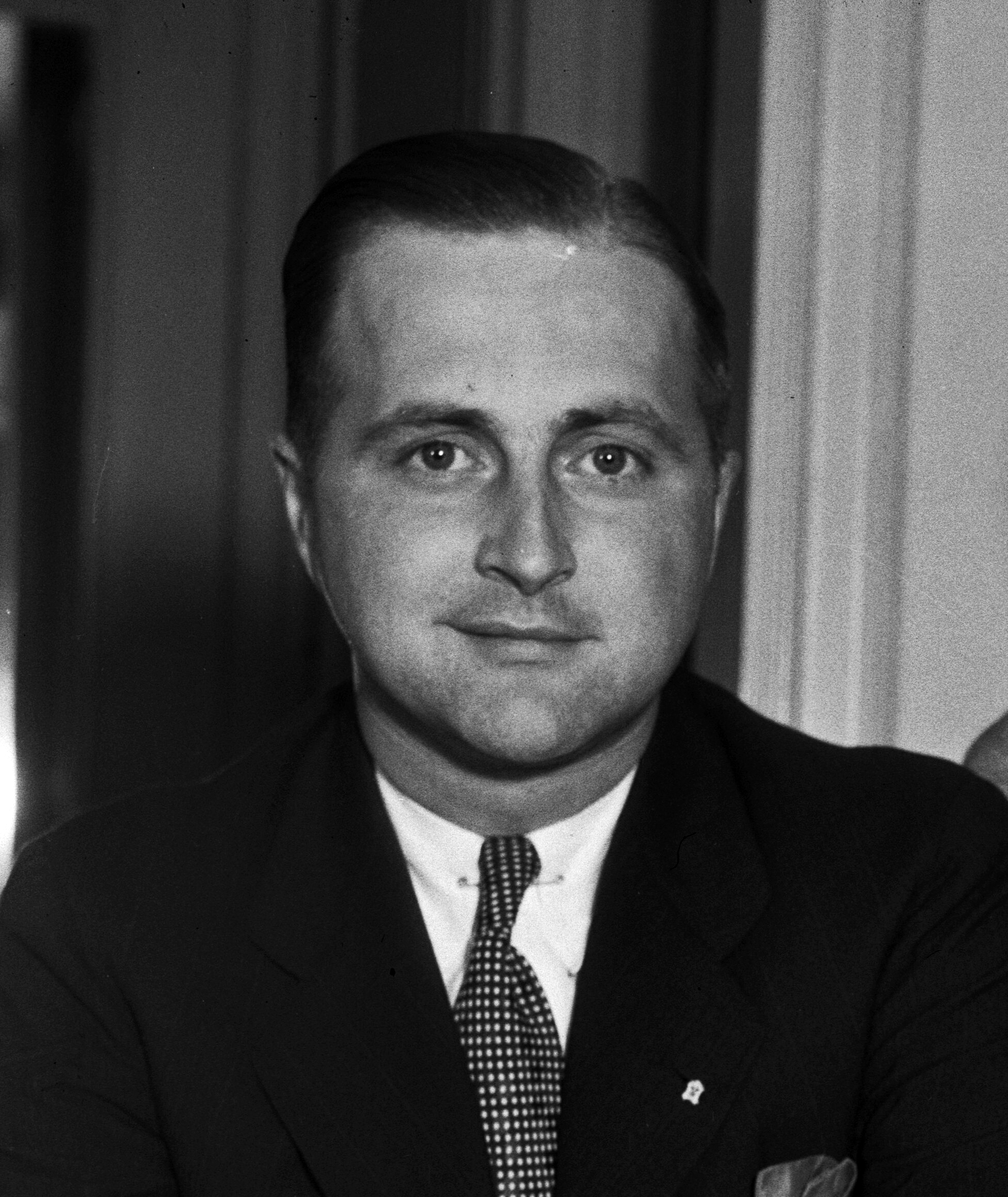
- Lafount in 1933
- Born: Harold Arundel Lafount (Note: During his lifetime, Lafount's name was almost always spelled as such, as was his father's. His daughter Lenore used LaFount, however, and subsequent biographers of George Romney sometimes referred to Harold as either LaFount or La Fount.); January 5, 1880; Birmingham, England
- Died: October 21, 1952 (aged 72); Detroit, Michigan, U.S.
- Education: Utah State Agricultural College
- Occupations: Businessman; government official
- Political party: Republican
- Spouses: Alma Luella Robison (m. 1903; died 1938); Gladys MacDonald (m. 1939; died 1943)
- Children: 4, including Lenore
- Family: Romneys

Harold Arundel Lafount (January 5, 1880 – October 21, 1952) was an American businessman who served on the Federal Radio Commission from 1927 to 1934. He was the father of Lenore Romney; the father-in-law of businessman and politician George W. Romney; and the maternal grandfather of businessman and politician Mitt Romney.

English-born, Lafount moved to the United States as a teenager and grew up in Utah. He managed several local businesses and was active in the Church of Jesus Christ of Latter-day Saints. Appointed to the Federal Radio Commission by President Calvin Coolidge, he was in charge of the zone covering the Western United States. Lafount played an important part in developments and decisions regarding the regulation of the broadcasting industry in the U.S., favoring perspectives that saw radio broadcasting as a fundamentally commercial enterprise. He was also an early influence in making radio airtime available to political candidates and parties.

Lafount later managed a number of well-known radio stations in the northeastern United States on behalf of Arde Bulova and served as president of the National Independent Broadcasters. A licensing issue regarding a station Lafount co-owned resulted in a protracted regulatory and legal matter that was finally decided in the U.S. Supreme Court.

== Early life and education, marriage and family ==
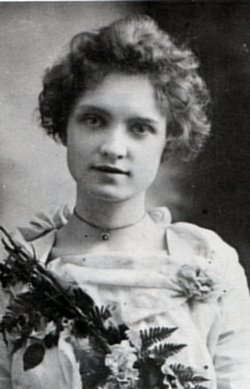
Alma Luella Lafount (née Robison)

Lafount was born in Aston town within Birmingham, England, on January 5, 1880, the son of Robert Arthur Lafount, originally from Belbroughton, Worcestershire, and mother Emily Ethel (Hewitt). He had at least one sibling, a sister called Elsie. The family came with Mormon missionaries to the United States in 1893 and settled in Utah.

Lafount gained a degree in civil engineering from Utah State Agricultural College. He returned to England as a Mormon missionary himself, arriving in Liverpool in August 1902 and being dispatched to Sheffield. However, he returned to the U.S. from Sheffield ahead of schedule in May 1903 due to illness.

On October 28, 1903, Lafount married Alma Luella Robison (born in Montpelier, Idaho, in 1882). They had four daughters: Elsie (born c. 1906), Lenore (born 1908), Constance (born c. 1911), and Ruth (born c. 1913).

== Early career ==
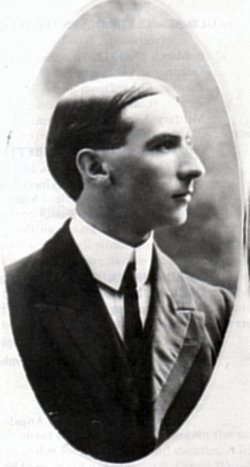
The young Lafount

Lafount first worked as an assistant in his father's hardware store in Logan, Utah, known as the Lafount Hardware Company, and then worked as its manager. He was in the hardware business for twelve years starting in 1903.

Beginning in 1909, while still living in Logan, Lafount held the position of general manager at the newly founded Pacific Land & Water Company of Salt Lake City, which acquired and developed land for agricultural and mining purposes. The company also had offices in Logan; on one trip between the two cities, he escaped with only bruises when the gasoline tank of his automobile exploded, hurling him some forty feet. Lafount worked at Pacific Land & Water for ten years. He was then a receiver for the Sevier River Land and Water Company from 1923 to 1927. By the mid-1920s, he was a manufacturer of earphones for crystal radio receivers. He knew prominent people socially, including LDS Church President Heber J. Grant and U.S. Senator from Utah Reed Smoot.

During the 1910s, the Lafount family had moved from Logan to Salt Lake City, where they lived in a large brick house located at Fifteenth South and Ninth East. From 1919 to 1924, Lafount was bishop of the ward (ecclesiastical and administrative head of his congregation) in the same area where he lived. His wife worked for the church, was a leader in social charities, and gave well-received dramatic readings. Daughter Lenore later described Harold as "a man of temper and drive" who was prone to angry outbursts.

== Federal Radio Commission ==
Upon the recommendation of Senator Smoot, in November 1927, President Calvin Coolidge appointed Lafount to the Federal Radio Commission (FRC), a new federal body created by the Radio Act of 1927 to regulate radio use in the United States, and the first such separate agency. The commission had gotten off to a slow start earlier that year due to problems with vacancies; Lafount was slotted for the Fifth Zone of the new entity, to replace original commissioner John F. Dillon, who had died shortly after taking that position. News of the appointment came as a surprise to the other members of the commission, since Lafount had little presence in the radio industry.

Upon arriving in Washington, D.C., for his new position, Lafount wanted to thank the president personally. Told by an appointment secretary that he would need a new morning suit, Lafount spent $175 to get one. After Lafount went to the White House and gave a brief speech of thanks, President Coolidge in response said only, "In case of doubt read the law. Good-day, sir." Lafount began traveling and working for the commission right away. The United States Senate subsequently confirmed Lafount by voice vote on March 30, 1928. Three other commissioners were confirmed at the same time, two by voice votes.

Lafount's zone covered the Rocky Mountain and Pacific states as well as the territories of Hawaii and Alaska. He traveled frequently, as part of visiting all kinds of radio stations in his large territory. At one point during 1927–1928 he took an 8,200 miles (13,200 km) trip in the zone, where he interviewed over 700 people, including over 100 listeners, representing over 100 radio stations. At another time during 1930 he climbed to high elevations in southern Colorado to hear the reception that ranchers, sheepherders, and rangers received. Some smaller radio stations had unsponsored time available, and he proposed the creation of citizen-based advisory boards to create programming for the benefit of community interests for such stations. Overall, however, he felt that too many small stations with weak signals were blocking reception of larger stations, and came to the conclusion that the number of stations should be reduced and the signals of the larger stations strengthened.

Over time, the commissioners' activities became less bound to their particular geographies. Accordingly, Lafount became responsible for coordinating FRC activities with other government agencies and entities. Lafount was in the public eye; The New York Times ran 140 stories that mentioned him during his stint on the FRC.

During his first months on the commission, Lafount was an informal member of the allocating committee that led to the FRC's 1928 reallocation of the commercial broadcast radio spectrum under General Order 40. Lafount subsequently supported the action, which enabled the growth of advertiser-based broadcasting but was criticized by some as a giveaway of a public resource (in the form of clear-channel frequencies) to large business and media interests. By 1931, Lafount was referring to General Order 40 as "the structure or very foundation upon which broadcasting has been built, and upon which the success or failure of every branch of the radio industry must depend."

Lafount believed that radio could help bring about a sense of national unity, which he favored, and that "common sources of entertainment" were among those characteristics that "constitute[d] bonds for making our people homogenous." However, he believed that radio programming should be based upon what listeners in the mass wanted to hear, and not upon what some central authority (such as the BBC in the English model) thought they would be best off hearing. Overall, Lafount was quite satisfied with the work of the FRC, writing in 1931 that "experts everywhere" agreed that the U.S. broadcasting system "is as perfect as it could be made."

The question of the educational value of radio was a constant issue, and by 1931 Lafount was strongly in the camp of those who believed that educational programming was on the increase. He said that there were adequate frequencies and hours for such content and defended the FRC's role in this regard. But he stressed that radio was fundamentally an instrument of commerce and that the FRC should take no action that might imperil that. In an oft-quoted 1931 statement, Lafount said, "Commercialism is at the heart of the broadcasting industry in the United States. What has education contributed to radio? Not one thing. What has commercialism contributed? Everything – the lifeblood of the industry."

However, the extent to which broadcast radio was dominated by advertising and by commercial interests became a hot topic, with members of the public requesting that Congress step in and take action. Lafount often warned commercial broadcasters that they faced a dismal future unless they mended their ways in this regard. In a 1932 speech before a St. Louis meeting of the National Association of Broadcasters, he said that "overcommercialization" was indeed a problem, and that radio broadcasters were "selling their birthright for a mess of pottage."

After witnessing early mechanical television in action, Commissioner Lafount said that the FRC was doing all it could to help develop the still-infant technology in terms of regulatory issues. He wrote in 1931 that, "I believe that television is destined to become the greatest force in the world. I think it will have more influence over the lives of individuals than any other single force." This remark has been quoted in several books about the history of television. He at the same time proposed the censorship of television, in order that objectionable images not be seen and the amount of advertising not be excessive.

Lafount became acting chairman of the commission during the latter part of 1932. Believing that the radio broadcasting system in the U.S. was "typically American" and "suits our democratic temperament as no other system I have yet encountered would," he urged broadcasters to air political programming and advertising during the 1932 U.S. presidential election. He thus became influential in the development of federal regulations specifying that candidates and parties receive equal airtime. Although a Republican, Lafount told broadcasters that they should supply free airtime and publicity to the subsequent Roosevelt administration's programs created under the National Industrial Recovery Act, in an effort to help the nation recover from the Great Depression. He refuted Republican accusations in 1933 that the Roosevelt administration was trying to censor radio broadcasts.

== Subsequent radio industry career; second marriage ==
Lafount stayed on the FRC until its replacement by the Federal Communications Commission (FCC) in 1934, but was not appointed to that body. The FRC role had enabled Lafount to know not just many government figures but also the people running the growing broadcasting industry. Upon leaving the FRC, he became head of the broadcasting interests of the Bulova Watch Company. Arde Bulova, chairman of the company, either owned or partly owned several radio stations.

On September 8, 1938, Lafount's wife Alma died in Washington, D. C. at the age of 56. He then married Gladys MacDonald on September 6, 1939, but she died in New York on June 14, 1943, at the age of 40. During these years, Lafount split his time among residences in New York, Washington, and Salt Lake City.

By 1941, Lafount was president of the National Independent Broadcasters, which represented some 200 radio stations (out of 800 total in the nation), focusing on those that were not affiliated with any network. During World War II, Lafount served as chairman of the radio committee within the New York City War Fund and subsequently was a member of the radio committee within the National War Fund.

In 1942, Lafount became president of the newly founded, New York-based Atlantic Coast Network, a regional network of radio stations, most of which Arde Bulova had an interest in. These included the well-known stations WNEW in New York, WPEN in Philadelphia, WELI in New Haven, WNBC in Hartford, WFCI in Providence, and WCOP in Boston with WFBR in Baltimore and WWDC in Washington soon joining. He maintained this position through at least the late 1940s. He served as vice-president of the Wodaam Corporation, which ran WOV, and the Greater New York Broadcasting Corporation, which ran WNEW; both were part of the larger Bulova interests. He was also vice president of WNBC, a different station with those call letters in New Britain, Connecticut, and the Fifth-Forty-Sixth Corporation.

Lafount was also president of the Broadcasting Service Organization in Boston, which ran WORL. As such, he was a principal in a long-running regulatory and legal case. In 1937, Lafount and two others, Sandford H. Cohen and George Cohen, had acquired 70 percent of WORL, a radio station in Boston, with Lafount becoming president. Accordingly, effective control of the station passed to Bulova. But Lafount and the others allegedly concealed the transaction from the FCC. During 1943 and 1944, the United States House Select Committee to Investigate the Federal Communications Commission, commonly referred to as the Lea Committee, held hearings on various aspects of broadcasting regulation. Lafount's matter was the subject of several days' investigation by that committee in Spring 1944. By late 1945, the FCC was threatening to not renew the station's license. The three co-owners said they had not consciously violated any regulations, because they thought FCC notification was only necessary if a single person gained more than half-control of a station. The commission claimed that deception and false reports had continued throughout the 1937 to 1943 period.

In April 1947, the FCC denied the license renewal, saying that Lafount and the other owners had shown "gross carelessness and willful disregard [of facts]" in giving false information about the ownership structure and financial status of the station. The agency sought other applicants for the 950 AM band frequency, while Lafount appealed their decision in federal court. In December 1948, the United States Court of Appeals for the District of Columbia Circuit overturned the FCC on a 2–to-1 decision, saying that the FCC had acted "arbitrarily, capriciously, and unreasonably" in refusing the renewal. The U.S. Justice Department appealed, however, and in May 1949, the United States Supreme Court handed down a brief, unsigned, unanimous decision that overturned the appeals court and stated that the FCC acted within its power when it refused the license renewal for Lafount and the other owners. The station, which had stayed on the air via temporary licenses, went off the air on May 30, 1949. (The station returned in October 1950, under new ownership.)

== Death and family legacy ==
Lafount died in Detroit, Michigan, on October 21, 1952, at age 72 in the home of his daughter Lenore. He was survived by his mother, his sister, and his four daughters. Broadcasting magazine wrote upon his passing that "Lafount was an important influence in the early development of radio regulation."

George Romney had first moved to Washington, D.C., in 1929 in order to remain near Lenore Lafount following her father's appointment to the FRC. They married in 1931. Social connections through the Lafounts enabled George to gain greater visibility in Washington business and political circles during the 1930s. By the late 1940s, Harold Lafount had been so impressed with his son-in-law that he asked lawyers to investigate whether the latter's Mexican birth would still make him eligible to run for president; they reported in the affirmative.

Following Lafount's death, George became chairman and president of American Motors Corporation and Governor of Michigan. He did indeed run for president in 1968, but the campaign was unsuccessful, after which he became U.S. Secretary of Housing and Urban Development. George's son, Mitt Romney (of whom Lafount is the maternal grandfather), became cofounder and CEO of Bain Capital, president and CEO of the Salt Lake Organizing Committee for the 2002 Winter Olympics, Governor of Massachusetts, Republican Party nominee in the 2012 U.S. presidential election, and United States Senator from Utah.

== Bibliography ==
- Benjamin, Louise M. (2006). Freedom of the Air and the Public Interest: First Amendment Rights in Broadcasting to 1935. Carbondale, Illinois: Southern Illinois University Press. ISBN 0-8093-2719-8.
- Craig, Douglas B. (2005). Fireside Politics: Radio and Political Culture in the United States, 1920–1940. Baltimore: Johns Hopkins University Press. ISBN 0-8018-8312-1.
- Goodman, David (2011). Radio's Civic Ambition: American Broadcasting and Democracy in the 1930s. New York: Oxford University Press. ISBN 978-0-19-539408-5.
- Harris, T. George (1967). Romney's Way: A Man and an Idea. Englewood Cliffs, New Jersey: Prentice-Hall. OCLC 437793.
- Jenson, Andrew (1920). Latter-day Saint Biographical Encyclopedia: A Compilation of Biographical Sketches of Prominent Men and Women in the Church of Jesus Christ of Latter-day Saints: Volume III. Salt Lake City: Arrow Press.
- Lymon, Francis M., ed. (1903). The Latter-Day Saints' Millennial Star: Volume LXV. Liverpool: Francis M. Lymon.
- Mahoney, Tom (1960). The Story of George Romney: Builder, Salesman, Crusader. New York: Harper & Brothers. OCLC 236830.
- McChesney, Robert W. (1995). Telecommunications, Mass Media, and Democracy: The Battle for the Control of U.S. Broadcasting, 1928–1935. New York: Oxford University Press. ISBN 0-19-509394-1.
- Rosen, Philip (1980). The Modern Stentors: Radio Broadcasters and the Federal Government, 1920–1934. Westport, Connecticut: Greenwood Press. ISBN 0-313-21231-7.
- Slotten, Hugh Richard (2009). Radio's Hidden Voice: The Origins of Public Broadcasting in the United States. Champaign, Illinois: University of Illinois Press. ISBN 978-0-252-03447-3.
- The Supplement to Who's Who: A Current Biographical Reference Series, Volumes 7–8. Marquis Who's Who. 1946.
