= American Laboratory Theatre =

- New York City, USA

Information
- Type: Drama school Theatrical company
- Established: 1923
- Founder: Richard Boleslavsky; Maria Ouspenskaya
- Closed: 1933

The American Laboratory Theatre was an American drama school and theatrical company located in New York City that existed during the 1920s and 1930s. It was a publicly subsidized, student-subscription organization that held fund-raising campaigns to support itself.

== History ==
The school itself was known as the Theatre Arts Institute. It was founded in 1923 by former Moscow Art Theatre members Richard Boleslavsky and Maria Ouspenskaya and stressed Stanislavski's system as its teaching method. Students were taught to be uninhibited, with exercises such as acting as a fish under water, a melting ice cream cone, or (for women) the mother of a sick child praying to the Madonna. Both actors and directors were trained, and Boleslavsky and Ouspenskaya became known as the leading promulgators of Stanislavski's ideas in America.

Some five hundred students were trained at the school during its years of existence. These included Lee Strasberg, Harold Clurman, and Stella Adler, all of whom would go on to exert a great influence on American acting. Future critic Francis Fergusson was also a student. Lenore LaFount started an acting career after her time at the school, but would soon marry George W. Romney and later become First Lady of Michigan and a political candidate in her own right (and the mother of businessman and politician Mitt Romney).

The school gave theatrical productions from 1925 to 1930. Richard Aldrich served as general manager for these productions before becoming a successful producer on Broadway. Relatively small in size, it aimed for a high-brow audience. Its productions included well-known works by William Shakespeare, Henrik Ibsen, and Anton Chekhov, but also included well-regarded instantiations of modern and avant-garde works such as Jean-Jacques Bernard's Martine and Arthur Schnitzler's The Bridal Veil. Talent scouts for radio and film attended the school's performances.

In 1929, Maria Germanova succeeded Boleslavsky as director of the theatre; she was also from the Moscow Art Theatre. The Lab, as it was sometimes known, disbanded in 1933, but was an important and influential link between Stanislavski's Moscow company and the even more influential Group Theatre of New York that followed it during the 1930s.
