= Helen Milliken =

First Lady of Michigan

First Lady of Michigan
- In role January 22, 1969 – January 1, 1983
- Governor: William Milliken
- Preceded by: Lenore Romney
- Succeeded by: Paula Blanchard

Personal details
- Born: Helen Wallbank; December 4, 1922 Denver, Colorado
- Died: November 16, 2012 (aged 89) Traverse City, Michigan
- Spouse: William Milliken (m. 1945)
- Children: 2

Helen Wallbank Milliken (December 4, 1922 – November 16, 2012) was an American women's rights activist, environmentalist, and former First Lady of Michigan. Milliken, the longest-lived First Lady in Michigan's history (living to 89 years old), served from 1969 to 1983 during the tenure of her husband, former Michigan Governor William Milliken. Milliken was known for her activism on behalf of many causes throughout her life. During the 1970s, she was one of Michigan's leading proponents of the proposed Equal Rights Amendment to the United States Constitution.

== Biography ==
=== Early life ===
Milliken was born Helen Wallbank on December 4, 1922, in Colorado, the second of four children of Stanley and Nellie (née Sillik) Wallbank. She attended a girls' school in Denver, Colorado. She enrolled in Smith College in Northampton, Massachusetts, after high school, where she earned a bachelor's degree in 1945.

In 1943, she met her future husband, William Milliken, in Colorado while she was home for summer break after completing her freshman year at Smith College. Milliken was then a student at Yale University (located approximately 80 miles from Smith College), but he was stationed at Lowry Field's aerial gunnery school for training in the United States Army Air Corps. During World War II, Milliken served as a U.S. Army Air Corps B-24 waist-gunner.

The couple married in October 1945, after having delayed their wedding six times due to Milliken's military commitments during the war. They moved to Connecticut, where they lived in a one-bedroom apartment while Milliken completed his senior year at Yale University.

Helen and William Milliken moved to his native Traverse City, Michigan, after his graduation from Yale University in 1946. They had two children there: William Milliken Jr., born October 14, 1946, and Elaine Milliken, who was born on June 6, 1948. A lawyer and feminist, Elaine died of cancer in 1993. Helen Milliken raised their two children while William worked for the family business, the now defunct Milliken's Department Store.

=== First Lady of Michigan ===
Helen Milliken first entered the political arena when her husband was elected a State Senator in 1960. William Milliken was elected as Lieutenant Governor of Michigan, serving under Governor George Romney. Milliken succeeded to the position of Governor of Michigan in 1969 when Romney resigned to become United States Secretary of Housing and Urban Development within President Richard Nixon's cabinet.

=== Support for the Equal Rights Amendment ===
Milliken served as First Lady for fourteen years, the longest tenure of any First Lady in state history. In this role, she became known as a proponent of women's rights and environmentalism. In particular, Milliken became one of Michigan's leading supporters of the Equal Rights Amendment (ERA) and was affiliated with ERAmerica. The ERA had been passed by the United States Congress in 1972 and was ratified by thirty-five states, including Michigan, in the next years. When the 1980 Republican National Convention, held in Detroit, removed language supporting the ERA from the convention platform, First Lady Helen Milliken boycotted the convention's opening ceremony to attend a pro-ERA protest.

=== Post-statehouse ===
In 1994, Democratic Michigan gubernatorial nominee Howard Wolpe asked Helen Milliken to be his running mate for Lieutenant Governor of Michigan. She declined Wolpe's offer. Wolfe selected then State Senator Debbie Stabenow as his running mate. He was defeated in the 1994 general election by incumbent Republican Michigan Governor John Engler.

While Helen Milliken largely avoided political campaigns during her later life, she endorsed two prominent Democrats for election. Milliken endorsed Jennifer Granholm for Governor of Michigan, as well as Democratic presidential nominee, Senator John Kerry, during the 2004 U.S. presidential election.

Honorary titles
Preceded by Lenore Romney	First Lady of Michigan; 1969 — 1983	Succeeded by Paula Blanchard
