= 1970 United States Senate election in Michigan =

- November 3, 1970
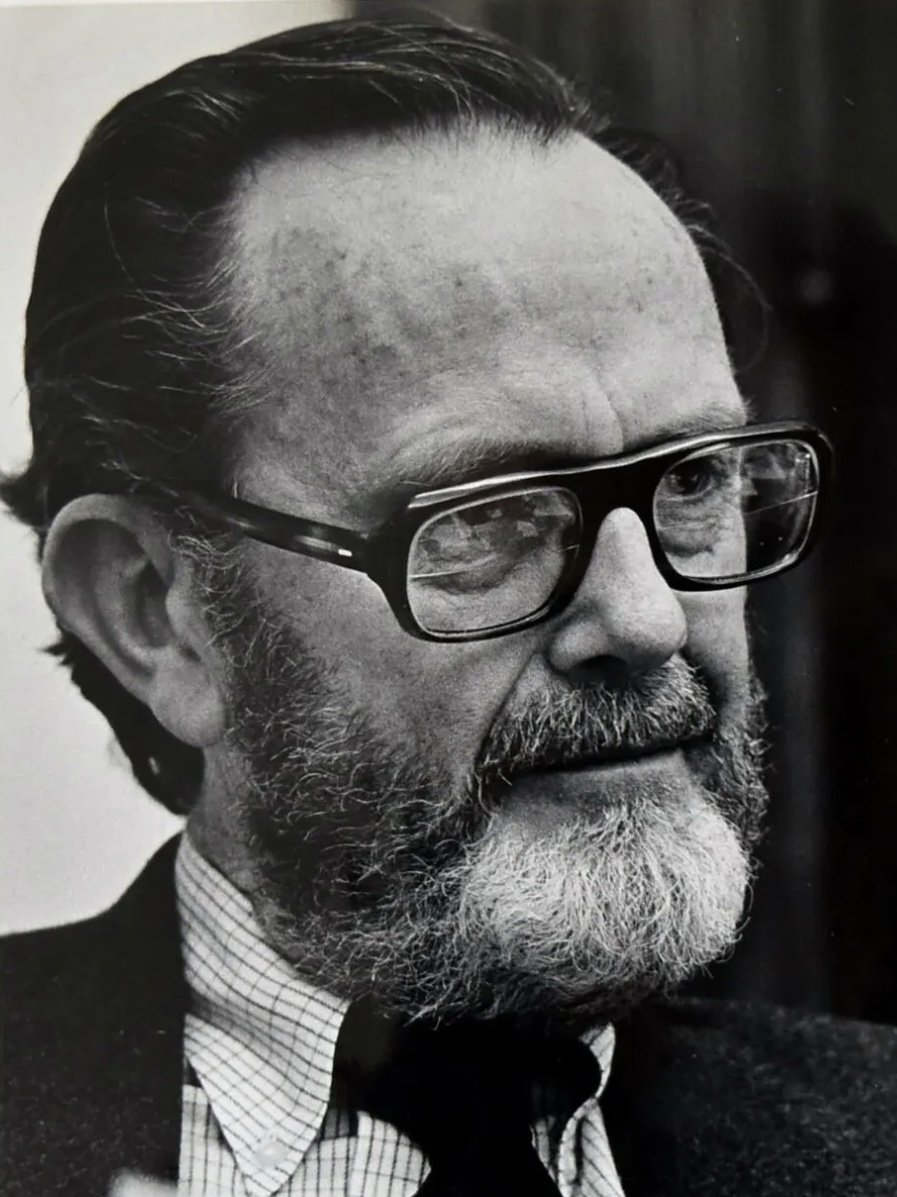

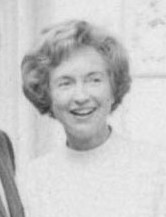
Nominee	Philip Hart	Lenore Romney
Party	Democratic	Republican
Popular vote	1,744,672	858,438
Percentage	66.84%	32.89%
- County results Hart: 40–50% 50–60% 60–70% 70–80% Romney: 50–60%
U.S. senator before election
Philip Hart
Democratic
Elected U.S. Senator
Philip Hart
Democratic

The 1970 United States Senate election in Michigan took place on November 3, 1970. Incumbent Democratic U.S. Senator Philip Hart was re-elected to a third term in office over former First Lady of Michigan Lenore Romney.

== Republican primary ==
=== Candidates ===
- Robert J. Huber, State Senator from Troy
- Lenore Romney, former First Lady of Michigan (1963–1969)

==== Withdrew ====
- Donald W. Riegle, Jr., U.S. Representative from Flint

==== Declined ====
- William Milliken, incumbent Governor of Michigan since 1969
- George W. Romney, U.S. Secretary of Housing and Urban Development and former Governor of Michigan (1963–1969)

=== Campaign ===
George W. Romney was an early favorite for the Republican nomination. President Richard Nixon, who never had good relations with George Romney either personally or on policy grounds, and whom Romney had run against for president in 1968, promoted him for Senate to get Romney out of his cabinet. However, George came up with the idea of his wife Lenore running, and sprung this proposal on Lenore and the children at the end of 1969. Lenore's professed no desire to run unless no other candidate could be found.

U.S. House Minority Leader Gerald Ford (from Grand Rapids) thought Lenore Romney could unite the state party's different factions, but Governor William Milliken opposed her candidacy. Some suspected that her Senate candidacy was just a stalking horse for keeping George's options open.

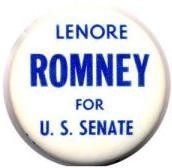
A Romney for Senate campaign button.

At a February 21, 1970 meeting of the Michigan Republican Party, convened to declare a "consensus" candidate, liberal U.S. Representative Donald W. Riegle, Jr. (who would be Hart's successor after switching to the Democratic Party) and conservative State Senator Robert J. Huber joined Milliken in opposition, blocking Lenore Romney from reaching the three-fourths majority required for the consensus declaration.

On February 23, Lenore Romney formally entered the contest for the Republican nomination for the Senate seat. George successfully pressured Milliken to endorse her, though this may have backfired when The Detroit News exposed the pressure campaign. At the next party meeting, on March 7, Lenore gained the consensus candidate position, and talk of George running ended. Riegle also ended his campaign.

In the ensuing primary, Romney's campaign emphasized her sex as a campaign theme, arguing, "Never before has the voice and understanding of a concerned woman been more needed." Billboards featuring her face, captioned only "Lenore" and omitting any reference to political party, were common throughout the state. She was considered photogenic but was so thin that she was sometimes described as "frail" or "waiflike."

Romney issued a half-hour campaign film that featured endorsements from many national and state party leaders as well as from celebrities Bob Hope and Art Linkletter, and showcased her family and her concern for disadvantaged people. Huber, in contrast, emphasized his edge in political experience, derided her "motherly concern", and criticized the "bossism" of the Romney family.

Romney called for the withdrawal of all American troops from Vietnam by the end of 1971 and characterized the Vietnam War as "disastrous." She expressed concern over the Cambodian Incursion and proposed an end to congressional funding if Nixon did not abide by his pledge to withdraw from there by the end of the month. On other issues, Romney sometimes took overly broad stances that appeared to come down on multiple sides. The conservative wing of the party, which had never trusted her husband, had the same reaction to her. The largely male press corps tended to deal with her in a paternalistic way, and she was often identified as "Mrs. George Romney" in stories and photo captions.

Initially heavily favored over Huber, her campaign failed to gain momentum and polls showed a close race; in response, she shifted her ads to focus more on her stands on issues. In the August 4, 1970, primary, Lenore Romney won a narrow victory, with 52 percent of the vote compared to Huber's 48 percent.

Republican primary results by county: Romney: Romney—50–60%; Romney—60–70%; Romney—70–80%; Huber: Huber—50–60%

=== Results ===
1970 Republican U.S. Senate primary
Party	Candidate	Votes	%
Republican	Lenore Romney	277,086	51.31%
Republican	Robert J. Huber	262,938	48.69%
Total votes		540,024	100.00%

== General election ==
=== Campaign ===
In the general election, with diminished prestige, a divided party, and with campaign resources drained by the primary fight, Romney was behind incumbent Democrat Hart from the beginning. Romney issued position papers and emphasized crime and social permissiveness, advocated a national healthcare plan, and expressed opposition to environmental damage caused by industry. She never made any personal attacks against Hart. As the only woman running for the U.S. Senate that year, she was a tireless campaigner, traveling around the state in a chartered Cessna and making as many as twelve stops a day.

Nevertheless, the perception grew that she did not have any vision for what she would do as a senator and was only in the race because she was George Romney's wife. In response, she said at one point, "I'm not a stand-in or a substitute for anyone." Her campaign material continued to just refer to "Lenore." She also was negatively impacted, in both the primary and general election, by fallout from her husband's effort as HUD Secretary to enforce housing integration in Warren, Michigan.

The Romney children campaigned for her, including Mitt, who took student leave to work as a driver and advance man at schools and county fairs during the summer. Together, Lenore and Mitt visited all 83 Michigan counties. George was in Washington most of the time and did not publicly campaign for her until the campaign's final day.

Consistently far ahead in polls, Hart staged a low-key campaign with few public appearances; he mostly ignored her and sometimes acted condescendingly towards her in private.

=== Results ===
General election results
Party	Candidate	Votes	%	±%
Democratic	Philip Hart (incumbent)	1,744,672	66.84%	▲3.46
Republican	Lenore Romney	858,438	32.89%	▼2.46
Socialist Workers	Paul Ludien	3,861	0.15%	▲0.06
Socialist Labor	James Sim	3,254	0.13%	▲0.08
Total votes		2,610,225	100.00%	
Democratic hold		Swing		

Hart handily won a third term with 67 percent of the vote to Romney's 33 percent. Romney made an unusual election-night visit to congratulate Hart in person, and in saying "I hope all good things will be his," gave what the victor termed "the most graceful and really moving concession speech I've ever heard."

In her election night remarks, Romney said, "I thought [running as a woman] would be an asset. It was disappointing to find that many people closed their minds just because I was a woman." The following year, Romney published an article in Look magazine describing the openly dismissive reaction she had gotten from both men and women. She wrote that, "In factories, I encountered men in small groups, laughing, shouting, 'Get in the kitchen. George needs you there. What do you know about politics?'" To a friend she wrote, "[I had no idea] how open and bare and wide my own vulnerability would be ... the body wounds are deep." She told one of her children that she wished she had not run, and concluded that "It's the most humiliating thing I know of to run for office."

== See also ==
- 1970 United States Senate elections
