= Orestes H. Caldwell =

Orestes Hampton Caldwell
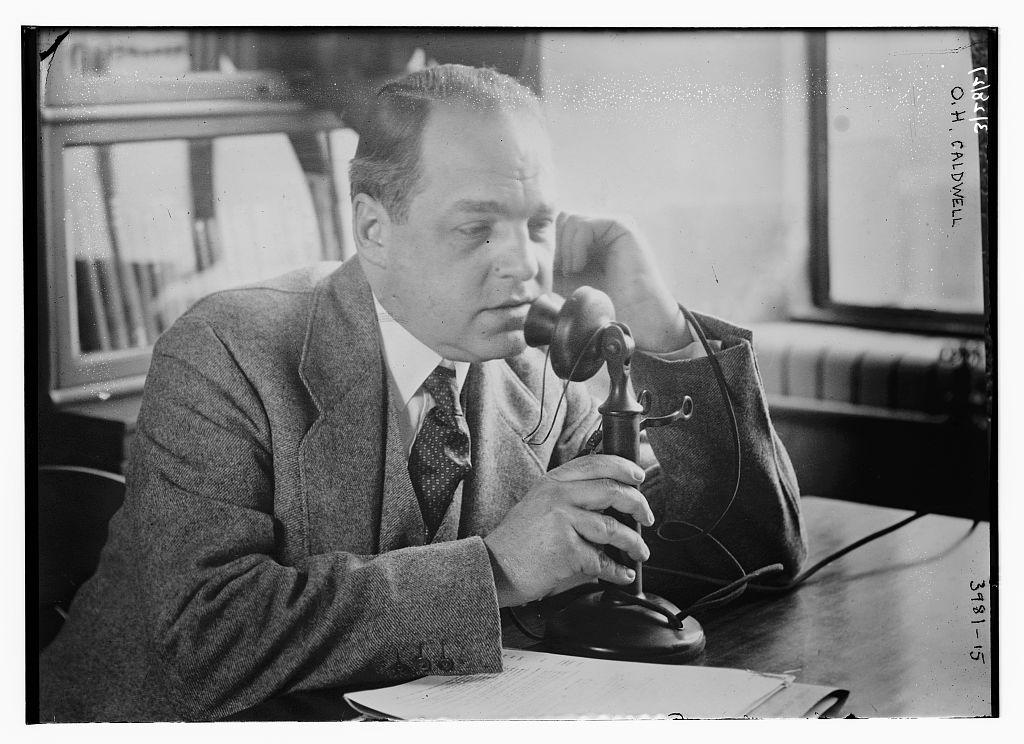
- Born: March 8, 1888; Lexington, Kentucky
- Died: August 27, 1967 (aged 79); Greenwich, Connecticut
- Education: Purdue University
- Known for: Federal Radio Commission
- Spouse: Mildred Bedard

Orestes Hampton Caldwell (March 8, 1888 – August 27, 1967) was one of the first five members of the Federal Radio Commission. He may have been the first person to coin the term electronics.

== Biography ==
He was born on March 8, 1888, in Lexington, Kentucky. He graduated from Purdue University as an electrical engineer, specializing in telephone and communications. In 1907 he succeeded Lee De Forest as technical editor of Western Electrician (later Electrical Review). He went on to edit a number of engineering and technical journals, including Electrical World, Electrical Merchandising, and Radio Retailing. He married Mildred Bedard.

In 1927, with the backing of United States Department of Commerce Secretary Herbert Hoover, he was appointed to the newly created Federal Radio Commission, where he helped oversee the reorganization of the U.S. radio system. His tenure on the FRC was marked by consistent support for high-powered radio, a position that led to frequent clashes with the United States Congress. Making matters worse, he seemed to lack the temperament for politics; as one newspaper put it, "A stormy petrel on the commission from start to finish, he narrowly escaped confirmation by the Senate both times. When he was on the grill the second time, he added to the gayety of the situation by bawling out Congress and this caused such a melee that he came within a couple of votes of being thrown out."

One of the enemies Caldwell made was a key senator for radio policy, Clarence Dill, who helped author the Radio Act of 1927. Upon Caldwell's resignation from the FRC, Dill commented, "Since Mr. Caldwell is leaving the commission I am not going to spend time discussing [his work there], except to say that I think the country is very fortunate that he has left. … I think anybody would be an improvement over Mr. Caldwell so far as the service of the public is concerned."

Nonetheless, Caldwell had the reputation of being the most technologically knowledgeable of the early Radio Commissioners. Following his stint on the FRC, he returned to the industry as editor of Electronics and in other capacities. A passionate fan of electronic gadgets, he hosted a weekly show called Radio Magic on NBC in the late 1930s and early 1940s. He also outfitted his house in Cos Cob, Connecticut, with all kinds of electrical devices as a kind of "Dwelling of the Future." World Trade called it the "House of One Thousand Servants" and "an electrical fairyland where every function and every household chore is accomplished automatically."

He died on August 27, 1967, in Greenwich, Connecticut.
