= Senator Huber =

Senator Huber may refer to:

- Henry Huber (1869–1933), Wisconsin State Senate
- Robert J. Huber (1922–2001), Michigan State Senate
