= Federal Radio Commission =

Former government agency of the United States (1927–1933)

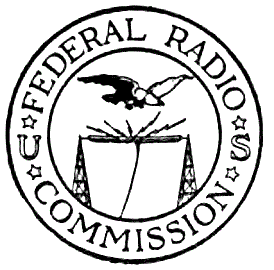

Agency overview
- Formed: 1927; 99 years ago
- Dissolved: 1934; 92 years ago
- Superseding agency: Federal Communications Commission
- Jurisdiction: United States federal government

The Federal Radio Commission (FRC) was a government agency that regulated United States radio communication from its creation in 1927 until 1934, when it was succeeded by the Federal Communications Commission (FCC). The FRC was established by the Radio Act of 1927, which replaced the Radio Act of 1912 after the earlier law was found to lack sufficient oversight provisions, especially for regulating broadcasting stations. In addition to increased regulatory powers, the FRC introduced the standard that, in order to receive a license, a radio station had to be shown to be "in the public interest, convenience, or necessity".

== Previous regulation ==
=== Radio Act of 1912 ===
Although radio communication (originally known as "wireless telegraphy") was developed in the late 1890s, it was largely unregulated in the United States until the passage of the Radio Act of 1912. This law set up procedures for the Department of Commerce to license radio transmitters, which initially consisted primarily of maritime and amateur stations. The broadcasting of news and entertainment to the general public, which began to be developed early 1920s, was not foreseen by this legislation.

The first Commerce Department regulations specifically addressing broadcasting were adopted on December 1, 1921, when two wavelengths were set aside for stations making broadcasts intended for a general audience: 360 meters (833 kHz) for "entertainment", and 485 meters (619 kHz) for "market and weather reports". The number of broadcasting stations grew tremendously in 1922, numbering over 500 in the United States by the end of the year. The number of reserved transmitting frequencies also expanded, and by 1925, the "broadcast band" consisted of the frequencies from 550 kHz to 1500 kHz, in ten kHz steps.

Herbert Hoover became the secretary of commerce in March 1921, and thus assumed primary responsibility for shaping radio broadcasting during its earliest days, which was a difficult task in a fast-changing environment. To aid decision-making, he sponsored a series of four national conferences from 1922 to 1925, where invited industry leaders participated in setting standards for radio in general.

==== Legal challenges ====
During his tenure Hoover was aware that some of his actions were on shaky legal ground, given the limited powers assigned to him by the 1912 Act. In particular, in 1921 the department had tried to refuse to issue a renewal license to a point-to-point radiotelegraph station in New York City, operated by the Intercity Radio Company, on the grounds that it was causing excessive interference to earlier radiotelegraph stations operating nearby. Intercity appealed, and in 1923 the Court of Appeals of the District of Columbia sided with Intercity, stating the 1912 Act did not provide for licensing decisions at "the discretion of an executive officer". The Department of Commerce planned to request a review by the Supreme Court, but the case was rendered moot when Intercity decided to shut down the New York City station. Still, it had raised significant questions about the extent of Hoover's authority.

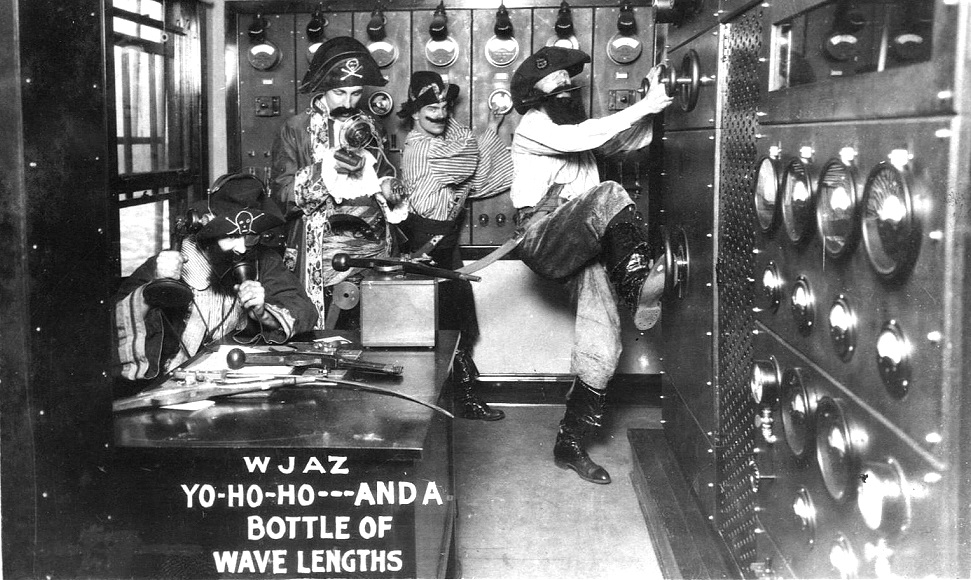
In 1926, station WJAZ successfully challenged the government's authority to assign transmitting frequencies under the Radio Act of 1912.

A second, ultimately successful, challenge occurred in 1926. The Zenith Radio Corporation in late 1925 established a high-powered radio station, WJAZ, with a transmitter site outside Chicago, Illinois. After being informed that there might not be an available frequency for the station to use, company president E. F. McDonald proposed that, because they only wanted to broadcast two hours a week, they would be happy with an assignment on 930 kHz that was limited to 10:00 p.m. to midnight Central time on Thursday nights, when the only other station on the frequency, KOA in Denver, Colorado, was normally off the air. Despite McDonald's initial expression of satisfaction with a schedule of just two hours per week, his tone soon changed. At this time the United States had an informal agreement with Canada that six designated AM band frequencies would be used exclusively by Canadian stations. In early January 1926, McDonald directed WJAZ to move from its 930 kHz assignment to 910 kHz, one of the restricted Canadian frequencies, and begin expanded hours of operation.

Invoking the Intercity Radio Company case rulings, Zenith ignored the Commerce Department's order to return WJAZ to its assigned frequency. On January 20, 1926, a federal court suit, United States versus Zenith Radio Corporation and E. F. McDonald, was filed in Chicago. McDonald expected a narrow ruling in his favor, claiming that only a small number of stations, including WJAZ, held the "Class D Developmental" licenses that were free from normal restrictions. However, the actual outcome was sweeping. On April 16, 1926, Judge James H. Wilkerson's ruling stated that, under the 1912 Act, the Commerce Department in fact could not limit the number of broadcasting licenses issued, or designate station frequencies. The government reviewed whether to try to appeal this decision, but Acting Attorney General William J. Donovan's analysis concurred with the court's decision.

The immediate result was that, until Congress passed new legislation, the Commerce Department could not limit the number of new broadcasting stations, which were now free to operate on any frequency and use any power they wished. Many stations showed restraint, while others took the opportunity to increase powers and move to new frequencies (derisively called "wave jumping"). The extent to which this new environment resulted in disruption for the average listener is difficult to judge, but the term "chaos" started to appear in discussions.

== Federal Radio Commission ==
=== Radio Act of 1927 ===
Prior to the early 1926 adverse ruling on the Commerce Department's regulatory authority, there had been numerous efforts in the U.S. Congress to replace the Radio Act of 1912 with a more comprehensive bill, but none of these efforts made much headway. The need for new legislation gained additional importance because, in the absence of federal regulation, stations were taking their individual disputes to the courts, which began to render decisions favoring incumbent stations. This effectively was granting established stations "property rights" in the use of their assignments, which the government wanted to avoid, because it generally considered the radio spectrum to be a public resource.

Despite the recognition that new legislation was needed, there was a lack of consensus whether it should increase the authority of the Secretary of Commerce, which opponents argued would create a too-powerful "Radio Czar", or if an independent regulatory body was needed, which some disputed was unneeded and overly expansive. The legislation ultimately passed was known as the Dill-White Bill, which was proposed and sponsored by Senator Clarence Dill (D-Washington) and Representative Wallace H. White Jr. (R-Maine) on December 21, 1926. It was brought to the Senate floor on January 28, 1927, and, as a compromise, specified that a five member commission would be given the power to reorganize radio regulation, but most of its duties would end after one year. After a month of debates this bill was passed on February 18, 1927, as the Radio Act of 1927, and signed into law by President Calvin Coolidge on February 23, 1927. The Commission's organizational meeting was held on March 15.

=== Commissioners ===
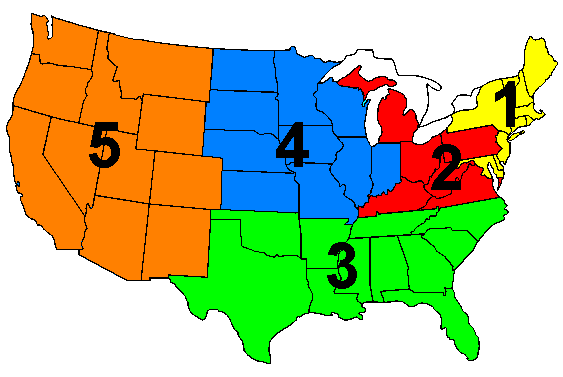
The five regional zones established by the Radio Act of 1927.

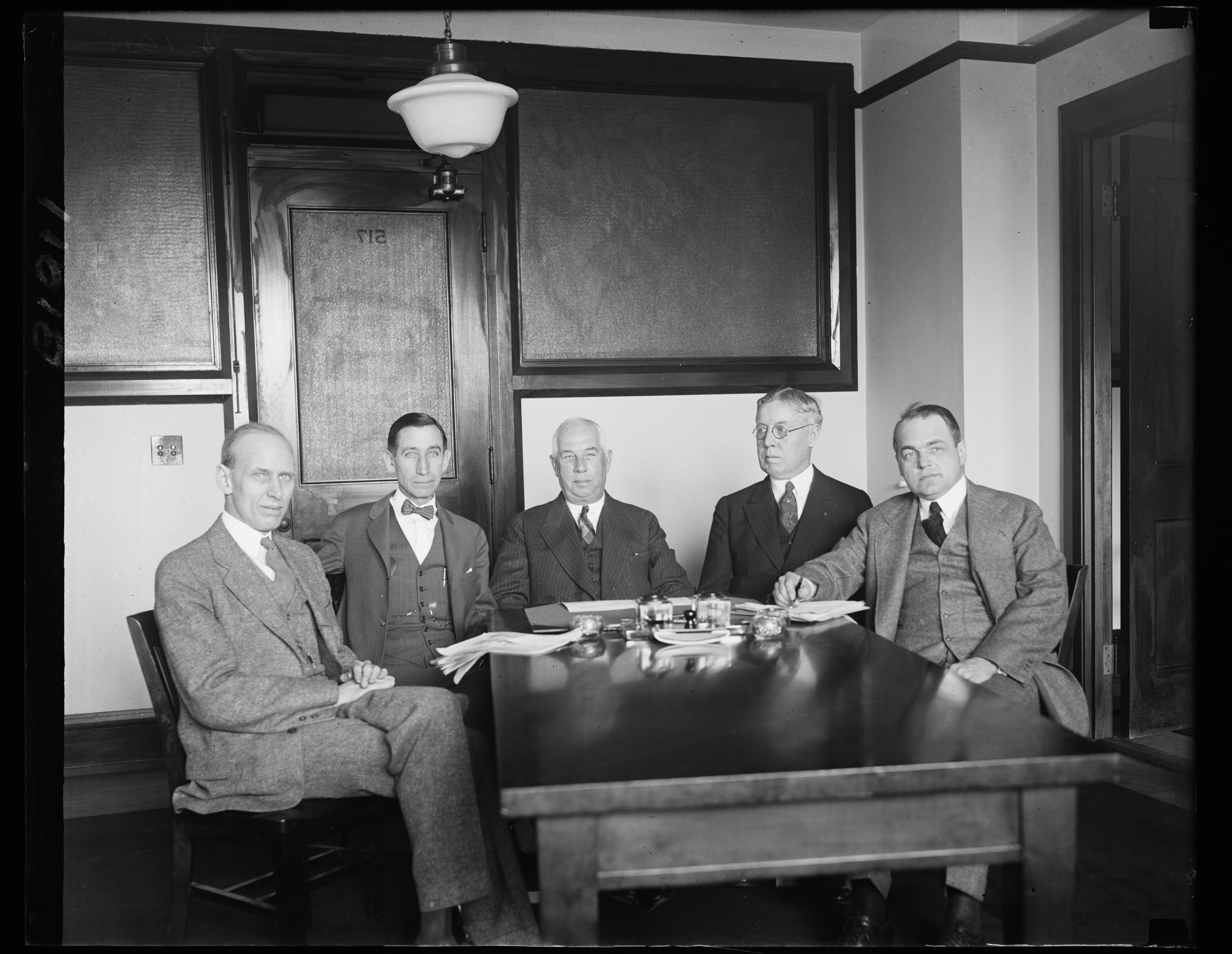
From left, Henry Adams Bellows, Eugene O. Sykes, Rear Admiral William H. G. Bullard (chair), John F. Dillon and Orestes H. Caldwell at the first meeting of the Federal Radio Commission in Washington, D.C. (1927)

The Radio Act of 1927 subdivided the country into five geographical zones, and specified that one commissioner would be appointed who resided within each zone. Terms were initially for up to six years, although this was later reduced to one year, and no more than three commissioners could be members of the same political party. The FRC's commissioners, by zone, from 1927 to 1934 were:

1. Orestes H. Caldwell (New York), (editor of Radio Retailing magazine); Caldwell resigned February 23, 1929, and was replaced by W. D. L. Starbuck (New York), Patent Attorney, appointed May 1929.
2. William H. G. Bullard (Pennsylvania); Bullard died November 24, 1927, and was replaced by Ira E. Robinson (West Virginia), State Supreme Court judge, who resigned January 1932, and was succeeded by the March 28, 1932, appointment of Col. Thad H. Brown (Ohio), lawyer and politico holding various offices including Ohio's Secretary of State, who served for the remainder of the FRC's existence and was appointed to the FCC in 1934.
3. Eugene O. Sykes (Mississippi) served the entire time the FRC existed and was appointed to the FCC in 1934.
4. Henry Adams Bellows (Minnesota); Bellows was forced to resign October 31, 1927, and later became chairman of the National Association of Broadcasters. He was replaced by Sam Pickard (Kansas), who resigned January 31, 1929, and was succeeded by Charles McKinley Saltzman (Iowa), who was appointed May 1929, resigned in June 1932, and was succeeded by James H. Hanley
5. John F. Dillon (California); Dillon died October 8, 1927, and was replaced by Harold A. Lafount (Utah); Lafount stayed on the FRC until its replacement by the FCC, but he was not appointed to that body. In the late 1930s he became president of the National Independent Broadcasters.

The five initial appointments, made by President Coolidge on March 2, 1927, were: Admiral William H. G. Bullard as chairman, Colonel John F. Dillon, Eugene O. Sykes, Henry A. Bellows, and Orestes H. Caldwell. Bullard, Dillon and Sykes were confirmed on March 4, but action on Bellows and Caldwell was deferred, so they initially participated without pay. In October 1927 Dillon died and Bellows resigned. During the next month Bullard died, and Harold Lafount and Sam Pickard were appointed. It was not until March 1928, after Caldwell was approved by a one vote margin and Ira E. Robinson was appointed as chairman, that all five commissioner posts were filled with confirmed members.

=== Responsibilities ===
To rectify the limitations of the 1912 act, the FRC was given the power to grant and deny licenses, assign station frequencies and power levels, and issue fines for violations. The opening paragraph of the Radio Act of 1927 summarized its objectives as:

"...this Act is intended to regulate all forms of interstate and foreign radio transmissions and communications within the United States, its Territories and possessions; to maintain the control of the United States over all the channels of interstate and foreign radio transmission; and to provide for the use of such channels, but not the ownership thereof, by individuals, firms, or corporations, for limited periods of time, under licenses granted by Federal authority, and no such license shall be construed to create any right, beyond the terms, conditions, and periods of the license."

Some technical duties remained the responsibility of the Radio Division of the Department of Commerce, and because Congress failed to provide funding for a staff, during the FRC's first year the commission was heavily dependent on support from Commerce personnel. Moreover, most of the FRC's work was expected to be completed within one year, and the original intention was that a majority of its functions would then revert to the Secretary of Commerce:

"Sec 5. From and after one year after the first meeting of the commission created by this Act, all the powers and authority vested in the commission under the terms of this Act, except as to the revocation of licenses, shall be vested in and exercised by the Secretary of Commerce; except that thereafter the commission shall have power and jurisdiction to act upon and determine any and all matters brought before it under the terms of this section."

Acting as a check on the commission's power, "censorship" of station programming was not allowed, although extreme language was prohibited:

"Sec. 29. Nothing in this Act shall be understood or construed to give the licensing authority the power of censorship over the radio communications or signals transmitted by any radio station, and no regulation or condition shall be promulgated or fixed by the licensing authority which shall interfere with the right of free speech by means of radio communications. No person within the jurisdiction of the United States shall utter any obscene, indecent, or profane language by means of radio communication."

However, the "public interest, convenience, or necessity" standard allowed the Commission to take into consideration program content when renewing licenses, and the ability to take away a license provided some degree of content control. This allowed the FRC to crack down on "vulgar" language — for example the profanity-filled rants of William K. Henderson on KWKH in Shreveport, Louisiana. But it also led to First Amendment free speech disputes over the appropriateness of some FRC actions.

A forerunner of the FCC's later "equal-time rule" required stations to give equal opportunities for political candidates:

"Sec 18. If any licensee shall permit any person who is a legally qualified candidate for any public office to use a broadcasting station, he shall afford equal opportunities to all other such candidates for that office in the use of such broadcasting station, and the licensing authority shall make rules and regulations to carry this provision into effect: Provided, That such licensee shall have no power of censorship over the material broadcast under the provisions of this paragraph. No obligation is hereby imposed upon any licensee to allow the use of its station by any such candidate."

The Radio Act of 1927 did not authorize the Federal Radio Commission to make any rules regulating advertising, although section 19 required advertisers to properly identify themselves. There was almost no mention of the radio networks — notably the National Broadcasting Company (NBC) and, a bit later the Columbia Broadcasting System) (CBS) — that were in the process of dominating broadcasting, other than a statement in section 3 that "The Commission shall have the authority to make special regulations applicable to stations engaged in chain broadcasting".

In early 1928 it became clear that the FRC needed more than a single year to perform its tasks, and its tenure was extended for an additional year. In December 1929 the commission's mandate was extended indefinitely.

The FRC's regulatory activities, and the public's knowledge of its work, primarily focused on broadcasting stations. However, in 1932, in addition to 625 broadcasting stations, the commission oversaw numerous other station classifications, including approximately thirty thousand amateur radio stations, two thousand ship stations, and one thousand fixed-point land stations. On February 25, 1928, Charles Jenkins Laboratories of Washington, DC, became the first holder of a television license.

=== Selected major FRC actions ===
The most critical issue the FRC faced at the time of its creation was an excess of broadcasting stations, which now numbered 732, all on the AM band. (The FM broadcast band would not be created until 1941). There were some significant technical restraints on the number of stations that could operate simultaneously. At night, a change in the ionosphere allows radio signals, especially from more powerful stations, to travel hundreds of kilometers. In addition, at this time transmitter frequency stability was often limited, which meant that stations broadcasting on nominally the same frequency often were actually slightly offset from each other, which produced piercing high-pitched "heterodyne" interference at even greater distances than the mixing of their audio. Another tool that was not yet available was directional antennas that could restrict signals to specified directions. Overall, the main tools available for insuring quality reception was limiting the number of stations operating concurrently, which meant restricting some stations to daytime-only operation, and in many cases requiring time-sharing, where up to four stations in a given region had to divide up the hours each used on a single frequency.

==== General Order 32 ====
On May 3, 1927, the FRC made the first of a series of temporary frequency assignments, which served to reassign the stations operating on Canadian frequencies, and also eliminate "split-frequency" operations that fell outside of the standard of transmitting on frequencies evenly divided by 10 kHz. The FRC conducted a review and census of the existing stations, then notified them that if they wished to remain on the air they had to file a formal license application by January 15, 1928, as the first step in determining whether they met the new "public interest, convenience, or necessity" standard.

After reviewing the applications, on May 25, 1928, the FRC issued General Order 32, which notified 164 stations that the initial review had found their justification for receiving a license insufficient, and they would have to attend a hearing in Washington, D.C. Moreover, "At this hearing, unless you can make an affirmative showing that public interest, convenience, or necessity will be served by the granting of your application, it will be finally denied."

Many low-powered independent stations were eliminated, although eighty-one stations did survive, most with reduced power. Educational stations fared particularly poorly. They were usually required to share frequencies with commercial stations and operate during the daytime, which was considered of limited value for adult education.

==== General Order 40 ====
With the roster of stations now reduced to a somewhat more manageable level, the FRC next embarked on a major reorganization of broadcasting station frequency assignments. On August 30, 1928, the Commission issued General Order 40, which defined a "broadcast band" consisting of 96 frequencies from 550 to 1500 kHz. Six frequencies were restricted for exclusive use Canadian stations, leaving 90 available for the slightly fewer than 600 U.S. stations. The new assignments went into effect on November 11, 1928.

Forty of the available frequencies were reserved for high-powered "clear channel" stations, which in most cases had only a single station with an exclusive nationwide assignment. Although generally accepted as being successful on a technical level of reducing interference and improving reception, there was also a perception that large companies and their stations had received the best assignments. Commissioner Ira E. Robinson publicly dissented, stating that: "Having opposed and voted against the plan and the allocations made thereunder, I deem it unethical and improper to take part in hearings for the modification of same". Some later economic analysis has concluded that the early radio regulation policies reflected regulatory capture and rent-seeking.

==== WGY assignment ====
Most of the FRC decisions reviewed by the courts were upheld, however a notable exception involved WGY in Schenectady, New York, a long established high-powered station owned by General Electric. Under the November 11, 1928, reassignment plan, WGY was limited to daytime hours plus evening hours until sunset in Oakland, California, where KGO, transmitting on the same frequency, was located. Previously, WGY had operated with unlimited hours. On February 25, 1929, the Court of Appeals of the District of Columbia ruled that restricting WGY's hours "was unreasonable and not in the public interest, convenience or necessity". The U.S. Supreme Court agreed to take the FRC's appeal, but following oral arguments declined to issue a ruling, after deciding that under current legislation it did not have oversight, thus allowing the lower court ruling to stand.

==== KFKB deletion ====
KFKB was a popular Milford, Kansas broadcasting station, licensed to an organization controlled by John R. Brinkley, known as "The Goat Gland Doctor" due to his promotion of "sexual rejuvenation" surgery that included implantation of slivers of goat testes.

In 1930 the Federal Radio Commission denied his request for renewal, primarily on the grounds that, instead of being operated as a public service, the station was primarily being run as "a mere adjunct of a particular business". (In one of Brinkley's programs he read listener mail describing medical issues, then recommended medication of dubious value, identified by numbers, over the air. Listeners had to visit a Brinkley "kick back" pharmacy to purchase these items.)

Brinkley appealed on the grounds that this was prohibited censorship, but the U.S. Court of Appeals denied his appeal, stating "This contention is without merit. There has been no attempt on the part of the commission to subject any part of appellant's broadcasting matter to scrutiny prior to its release. In considering the question whether the public interest, convenience, or necessity will be served by a renewal of appellant's license, the commission has merely exercised its undoubted right to take note of appellant's past conduct, which is not censorship."

Denied this station, Brinkley moved his operations to a series of powerful Mexican outlets located on the U.S. border, which helped to lead to implementation of the North American Regional Broadcasting Agreement in 1941.

==== KGEF deletion ====
KGEF was a broadcasting station first licensed in late 1926 to Trinity Methodist Church, South, in downtown Los Angeles. Its programming was dominated by long denunciations made by pastor Robert "Fighting Bob" Shuler, who stated that he operated the station in order to "make it hard for the bad man to do wrong in the community", but his strident broadcasts soon became very controversial. After a 1931 evaluation of the station's renewal application, chief examiner Ellis A. Yost expressed misgivings about Shuler's "extremely indiscreet" broadcasts, but recommended approval. However, a review by the Commission concluded that the station should be deleted, because it "...could not determine that the granting thereof was in the public interest; that the programs broadcast by its principal speaker were sensational rather than instructive and in two instances he had been convicted of attempting over the radio to obstruct orderly administration of public justice".

The Court of Appeals of the District of Columbia affirmed the Commission's decision and held that, despite First Amendment protections: "...this does not mean that the Government, through agencies established by Congress, may not refuse a renewal license to one who has abused it to broadcast defamatory and untrue matter. In that case there is not a denial of the freedom of speech but merely the application of the regulatory power of Congress in a field within the scope of its legislative authority". The court also ruled that denying license renewal as not in the public interest did not violate the Fifth Amendment's prohibition of "taking of property" without due process of law. This ruling became final after a petition for writ of certiorari requesting review by United States Supreme Court was denied.

==== WNYC assignment ====
Under the November 11, 1928, reorganization, WNYC, the municipal station of New York City, was given a half-time, low-power assignment. The station appealed on the grounds that it should have been given a full-time authorization, but lost. Even though the station was government owned, the Federal Radio Commission said that city ownership did not give the station any special standing under the "public interest, convenience, and necessity" standard. However, the case was viewed as representative of the preferences given to commercial interests above those of non-commercial stations.

==== Davis Amendment implementation ====
Section 9 of the 1927 Act included a general declaration about the need to equitably distribute station assignments, stating: "In considering applications for licenses and renewals of licenses, when and in so far as there is a demand for the same, the licensing authority shall make such a distribution of licenses, bands of frequency of wave lengths, periods of time for operation, and of power among the different States and communities as to give fair, efficient, and equitable radio service to each of the same." The 1928 reauthorization strengthened this mandate, by including a provision, known as the "Davis Amendment" after its sponsor Representative Ewin L. Davis (D-Tennessee), that required "a fair and equitable allocation of licenses, wave lengths, time for operation, and station power to each of the States, the District of Columbia, the Territories and possessions of the United States within each zone, according to population". This resulted in an additional degree of complexity, for in addition to stations being judged on their individual merits, the commission had to monitor whether in heavily populated areas a decision would cause a zone or state to exceed its calculated quota.

In cases where two or more stations shared a common frequency on a timesharing basis, a station could petition the FRC to have its hours of operation increased by having the other stations deleted. A prominent example under the FRC's jurisdiction occurred when a Gary, Indiana station, WJKS, proposed the deletion of its two timeshare partners, WIBO and WPCC, both located in Chicago, Illinois. A major justification was that Indiana was currently under-quota based on the Davis Amendment provisions, while Illinois had exceeded its allocation. The commission ruled in favor of WJKS, however the Court of Appeals of the District of Columbia reversed the decision, calling it "arbitrary and capricious". The FRC appealed the lower court decision to the Supreme Court, stating that the issue impacted 116 separate cases pending before it.

A unanimous Supreme Court overturned the District Court, and ruled in FRC's favor, upholding the validity of the Davis Amendment provisions. WIBO made a final attempt to convince the FRC that the expression of strong ties to Indiana by WJKS was fraudulent, and WJKS's owners were really attempting to establish another Chicago station. This appeal was unsuccessful, and both WIBO and WPCC had to cease broadcasting. In 1934 the Davis Amendment provisions were carried over to the FCC, but they were repealed on June 5, 1936. In 1944 WJKS, after changing its call letters to WIND, moved from Gary to Chicago.

== Replacement by the Federal Communications Commission ==
The Communications Act of 1934 abolished the Federal Radio Commission and transferred jurisdiction over radio licensing to the new Federal Communications Commission (FCC). Title III of the Communications Act contained provisions very similar to the Radio Act of 1927, and the FCC largely took over the operations and precedents of the FRC. The law also transferred jurisdiction over communications common carriers, such as telephone and telegraph companies, from the Interstate Commerce Commission to the FCC.
