= John Francis Dillon (commissioner) =

American radio engineer (1866–1927)

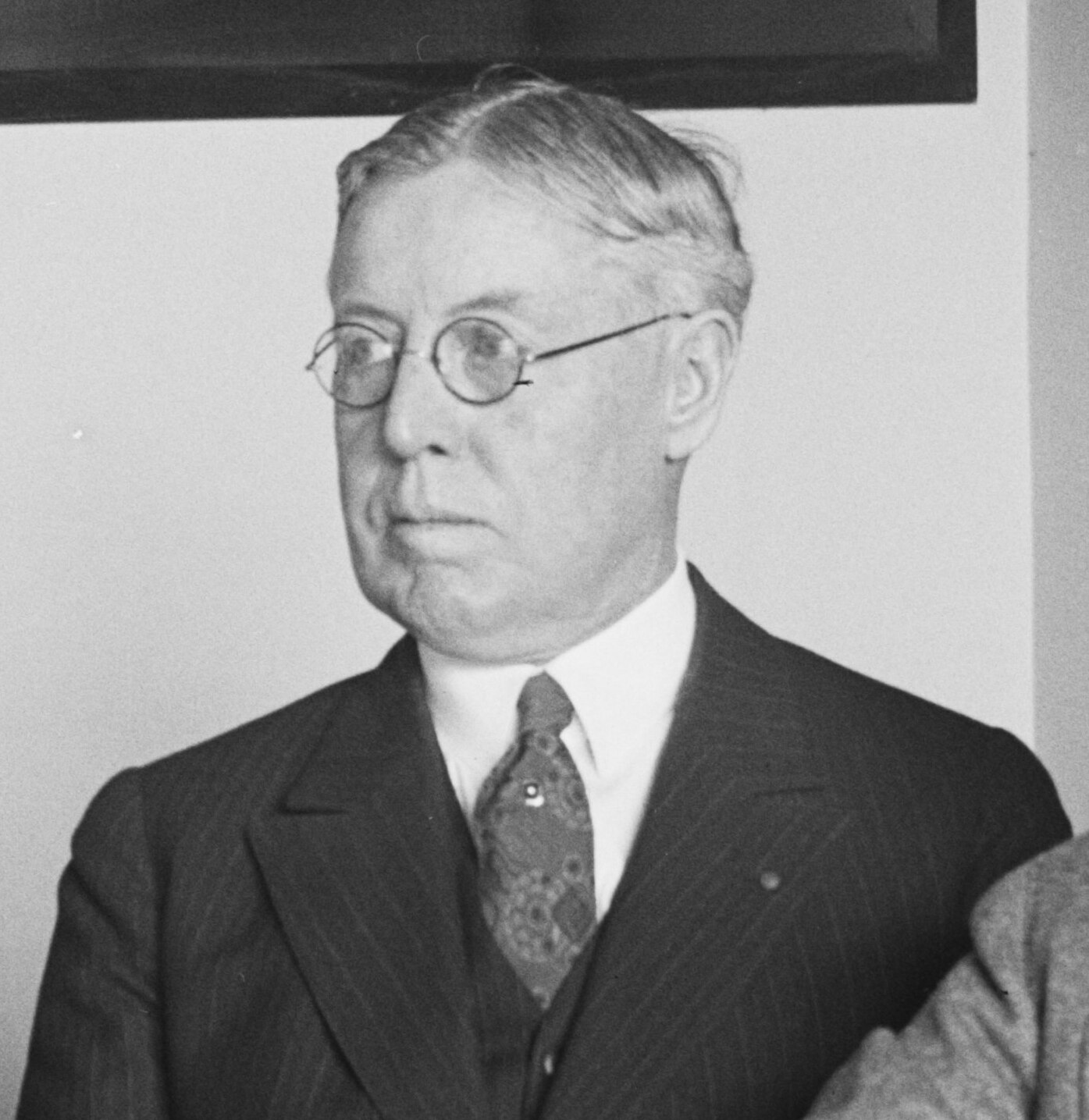
- Dillon in 1927
- Born: March 6, 1866; Bellevue, Ohio, U.S.
- Died: October 9, 1927 (aged 61); San Francisco, California, U.S.
- Burial place: San Francisco National Cemetery
- Spouse: Belle K.
- Children: 3
- Military career
- Allegiance: United States of America
- Branch: United States Army (Signal Corps)
- Service years: 1894–1912, 1917–1919
- Rank: Lieutenant colonel
- Conflicts: Spanish–American War; World War I; Meuse–Argonne offensive
- Other work: radio commissioner

John Francis Dillon (March 6, 1866 – October 9, 1927) was one of the first members of the United States Federal Radio Commission, the forerunner of the Federal Communications Commission.

== Early life ==
John Francis Dillon was born on March 6, 1866, in Bellevue, Ohio. He attended high school.

== Career ==
Dillon tried various occupations. On April 15, 1894, he enlisted in the Signal Corps of the U.S. Army and worked as a telegraph operator and general electrician. He served during the Spanish–American War. His term ended in 1899 and he attained the rank of sergeant. He reenlisted and was superintendent of telegraphs in Cavite and Rizal in the Philippines. He worked as the chief operator for General William Rufus Shafter. After the war, he was later placed in the Signal Corps's electrical laboratory. He conducted telegraphic and telephonic experiments and researched radiography. He helped develop field radio equipment used by the army. In 1904, he attained the rank of master electrician. In 1908, he collaborated with General George Owen Squier in developing a wired wireless system. He served continuously until 1912.

In 1912, Dillon became radio inspector for the U.S. Department of Commerce in Chicago, which had just been given authority over radio by the Radio Act of 1912. He was also the radio inspector for the U.S. Department of Labor. He then worked for the 8th Radio District, headquartered in Cleveland. At the start of World War I, Dillon reenlisted in the Army. He was commissioned a captain and returned to the Signal Corps. From 1917 to 1919, he served in France and was promoted to major. He participated in the Meuse–Argonne offensive. He was discharged at the end of the war as the rank of major. He ultimately attained the rank of lieutenant colonel; serving for a time in the Army Reserve.

In April 1919, Dillon again worked as radio inspector for the Department of Commerce, first in San Francisco and then in Chicago. He was appointed radio inspector of the Pacific Coast. In May 1923, he was promoted to supervisor of radio for the 6th Radio District, which included California, Nevada, Utah, Arkansas and Hawaii. Following the Dill–White Radio Law, he was appointed Federal Radio Commissioner of the Fifth Zone.

On March 1, 1927, Dillon was appointed by President Calvin Coolidge to the Federal Radio Commission for a two-year term as one of its first five members. In that role, he was headquartered in San Francisco, and traveled to Washington, D.C., Chicago, New York and Cleveland. Some months later, he offered his resignation due to illness, but it was not accepted. He died months later and was replaced on the commission by Harold LaFount.

Dillon was a fellow of the Institute of Radio Engineers. He was known as the "Father of Pacific Coast Radio".

== Personal life ==
Dillon married Belle K. They had three daughters, Doris, Marjorie and Frances.

In May or June 1927, Dillon had a jaw infection. Several months later, after treatment for the infection, he died on October 9, 1927, at Letterman General Hospital in San Francisco. He was interred at San Francisco National Cemetery. On October 12, from 11:00 to 11:02 AM local time, all Pacific Coast radio stations were silenced in recognition of Dillon and marking his time of burial.
