= John B. Bennett =

American politician (1904–1964)

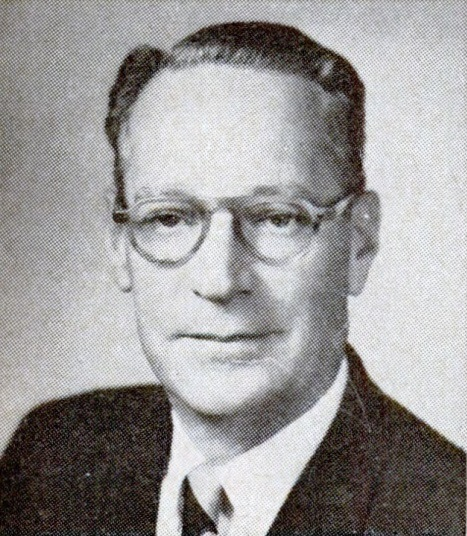

Member of the U.S. House of Representatives from Michigan's 12th district
- In office January 3, 1947 – August 9, 1964
- Preceded by: Frank Hook
- Succeeded by: Raymond F. Clevenger (redistricting)
- In office January 3, 1943 – January 3, 1945
- Preceded by: Frank Hook
- Succeeded by: Frank Hook

Personal details
- Born: John Bonifas Bennett; January 10, 1904 Garden, Michigan
- Died: August 9, 1964 (aged 60) Chevy Chase, Maryland
- Resting place: Gate of Heaven Cemetery
- Party: Republican

John Bonifas Bennett (January 10, 1904 – August 9, 1964) was an American lawyer and politician from the U.S. state of Michigan. He served in the United States House of Representatives from 1947 to 1964. He is so far the last Republican since 1964 to represent Michigan's 12th congressional district.

== Early life and education ==
Bennett was born in Garden, Michigan, his mother was an immigrant from Luxembourg. He attended the public schools, and graduated from Watersmeet High School. He graduated from Marquette University Law School in 1925 and took a post-graduate course at the University of Chicago Law School in 1926.

He was admitted to the Wisconsin bar in 1925 and to the Michigan bar in 1926. He practiced law in Ontonagon, Michigan, from 1926 through 1942. He was prosecuting attorney of Ontonagon County from 1929 to 1934 and the deputy commissioner of the Michigan Department of Labor and Industry from 1935 to 1937.

== Tenure in Congress ==
Bennett was unsuccessful in his first two attempts for a seat in the United States House of Representatives, losing in 1938 and 1940 to incumbent Democrat Frank E. Hook. In 1942 Bennett defeated Hook and was elected as a Republican from Michigan's 12th congressional district to the 78th Congress, serving from January 3, 1943, to January 3, 1945.

In 1944 Bennett lost the election to Hook. Two years later in 1946 he returned to Congress once again, having been unsuccessfully challenged by Emil Hurja in the Republican primary. He was subsequently re-elected to the eight succeeding Congresses, serving from January 3, 1947, until his death from cancer in Chevy Chase, Maryland, in August 1964.

In Congress, Bennett was a moderate Republican who voted against the Civil Rights Acts of 1957 and 1960, but voted in favor of 24th Amendment to the U.S. Constitution as well as the Civil Rights Act of 1964 shortly before his death at age 60. During his time in Congress, Bennett voted in favor of various progressive measures such as those related to the federal minimum wage, housing, and food stamps.

He is interred in Gate of Heaven Cemetery in Silver Spring, Maryland.

== See also ==
- List of members of the United States Congress who died in office (1950–1999)

U.S. House of Representatives
Preceded by Frank Hook	United States Representative for the 12th congressional district of Michigan; 1943 – 1945	Succeeded by Frank Hook
Preceded by Frank Hook	United States Representative for the 12th congressional district of Michigan; 1947 – 1964	Succeeded by James G. O'Hara
