= Leon Henderson =

American government official (1895–1986)

- Henderson in 1940

Member of the U.S. Securities and Exchange Commission
- In office May 18, 1939 – July 8, 1941
- President: Franklin D. Roosevelt

Administrator of the Office of Price Administration
- In office 1941–1942
- President: Franklin D. Roosevelt
- Preceded by: Position established
- Succeeded by: Prentiss M. Brown

Personal details
- Born: May 26, 1895 Millville, New Jersey, U.S.
- Died: October 19, 1986 (aged 91)
- Party: Democratic
- Education: Swarthmore College

Leon Henderson (May 26, 1895 – October 19, 1986) was the administrator of the Office of Price Administration from 1941 to 1942. He also served as a member of several United States federal government agencies during World War II.

== Life and career ==
Henderson was born in Millville, New Jersey, where he attended Millville High School, and later Swarthmore College.

Hired by the Commonwealth of Pennsylvania to serve during the first term of Governor Gifford Pinchot, Henderson assisted Pinchot in creating the Pennsylvania State Employees’ Retirement System in 1923 and served as deputy secretary of state. He also taught at Carnegie Tech (now Carnegie Mellon University) and the University of Pennsylvania.

From 1925 to 1934, Henderson was the director of remedial loans at the Russell Sage Foundation.

Henderson worked as an economic adviser in President Franklin Roosevelt's administration before he was appointed to the Securities and Exchange Commission in 1939. In 1941 he became head of the Office of Price Administration. His tenure there was controversial and he was deeply unpopular, especially with farmers. Edwin W. Pauley, secretary of the Democratic National Committee in 1942, listed five factors for Democratic losses in the 1942 election, and resentment of Leon Henderson was listed as one of the top five reasons for that defeat. As he wrote, "This was the most universal and serious complaint of all ... It appears from the letters that the complaint is directed rather at Mr. Henderson and his attitude and methods than at the abstract question of ... rationing and price control." Those losses ensured that no more New Deal social measures would be passed by the US during World War II, and that many of them would be repealed.

Henderson was replaced after the 1942 election and went into a career in business.

He died in 1986. Before his death, he personally donated many of his papers to the Franklin D. Roosevelt Presidential Library.
