= Frank Eugene Hook =

American politician

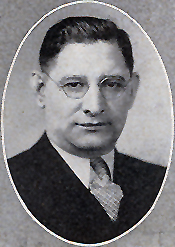

Member of the U.S. House of Representatives from Michigan's 12th district
- In office January 3, 1945 – January 3, 1947
- Preceded by: John B. Bennett
- Succeeded by: John B. Bennett
- In office January 3, 1935 – January 3, 1943
- Preceded by: W. Frank James
- Succeeded by: John B. Bennett

Personal details
- Born: Frank Eugene Hook; May 26, 1893 L'Anse, Michigan, U.S.
- Died: June 21, 1982 (aged 89) Edina, Minnesota, U.S.
- Party: Democratic
- Education: University of Detroit; Valparaiso University

Military service
- Allegiance: United States
- Branch/service: United States Army
- Years of service: 1918–1919
- Battles/wars: World War I

Frank Eugene Hook (May 26, 1893 – June 21, 1982) was a politician from the U.S. state of Michigan.

== Early life ==
Hook was born in L'Anse, Michigan and graduated from L'Anse High School in 1912. He attended the College of Law of the University of Detroit and graduated from the law department of Valparaiso University in 1918. He served in the United States Army Infantry during World War I from July 1918 until February 1919.

After the war, he was employed in lumber woods and as an iron ore miner and also as a law clerk at Wakefield, Michigan, 1919–1924. He was a member of the board of supervisors of Gogebic County, 1921–1923. Admitted to the bar in 1924, he commenced practice in Wakefield. He was admitted to practice before the United States Supreme Court in 1936. He also served as city commissioner of Wakefield from 1921 to 1923 and as municipal judge of Wakefield in 1924 and 1925.

Hook moved to Ironwood in 1925 and continued the practice of law. He was president of WJMS Radio Station in Ironwood, 1930–1933 and was a delegate to Democratic National Conventions in 1936, 1940, 1944, and 1948.

== Political career ==
In 1934, Hook was the Democratic Party candidate from Michigan's 12th congressional district for the U.S. House of Representatives. Hook defeated incumbent Republican W. Frank James in the general election to be elected to the 74th Congress and to the three succeeding Congresses, serving from January 3, 1935 to January 3, 1943. In 1942, Hook lost in the general election to Republican John B. Bennett (having previously defeated him in 1938 and 1940). In 1944, Hook defeated Bennett to reclaim the seat in the 79th Congress, serving from January 3, 1945 to January 3, 1947. He lost the seat again to Bennett in 1946. In 1948, he made an unsuccessful bid to be elected United States Senate, losing to Republican Homer Ferguson.

Hook served under Presidents Franklin Delano Roosevelt and Harry S. Truman. He voted to declare war upon Japan, when Congress was convened upon the attack on Pearl Harbor. Hook was instrumental in the establishment of Social Security and the minimum wage — part of Roosevelt's New Deal. He also proposed a bill to establish the Isle Royale National Park, located in Lake Superior and had the honor of dedicating it in August 1946.

In 1940, Hook alleged in Congress that Martin Dies had ties to William Dudley Pelley, the leader of a fascist organization, the Silver Legion of America. However, unbeknownst to him, the documents Hook used to make his case turned out to be forgeries.

Hook's moniker "Fightin' Frank," earned from high school days, was reinforced once again during an infamous bout on the floor of Congress. His nemesis, John Rankin of Mississippi, drew his ire, but could not cull a punch, as Hook was later quoted, "A gentleman cannot strike an old man." The wrassling match was physically initiated by Rankin jumping on Hook's back on Washington's birthday in 1945, during the session. The skirmish was the end result of a verbal exchange between Hook & Rankin concerning the former's support and the latter's denouncement of the C.I.O. Rankin hollered shouts of "communism!" while Hook defended the integrity of the organization. As to the disruption, Hook later recited a 3-minute apology, while Rankin maintained his own innocence. When Hook offered to resign if Rankin would also "...for the good of the country," Rankin "held his tongue" and the controversial exchange faded into obscurity.

Hook was a member of the President's Fair Employment Practices Committee in 1943 and 1944 and was appointed a member of Motor Carrier Claims Commission October 1, 1949, serving until his resignation August 22, 1950. He made several unsuccessful attempts to reclaim a seat in the U.S. House from the 12th district, losing in 1954 to Bennett in the general election, losing in 1956 and 1958 to Joseph S. Mack in the Democratic primary elections. In 1966, he lost to incumbent Raymond F. Clevenger in the Democratic primary for the 11th district.

== Later life ==
He resumed the practice of law in Detroit and in 1953 moved to Ironwood where he reestablished his law practice. He was admitted to the Wisconsin bar in 1962 and was a resident of Edina, Minnesota, at the time of his death. He is interred in Fort Snelling National Cemetery in Minneapolis, Minnesota.

Party political offices
Preceded by Prentiss M. Brown	Democratic nominee for U.S. Senator from Michigan (Class 2); 1948	Succeeded by Patrick V. McNamara
U.S. House of Representatives
Preceded by W. Frank James	United States Representative for the 12th congressional district of Michigan; 1935 – 1943	Succeeded by John B. Bennett
Preceded by John B. Bennett	United States Representative for the 12th congressional district of Michigan; 1945 – 1947	Succeeded by John B. Bennett
