= John F. Luecke =

American politician

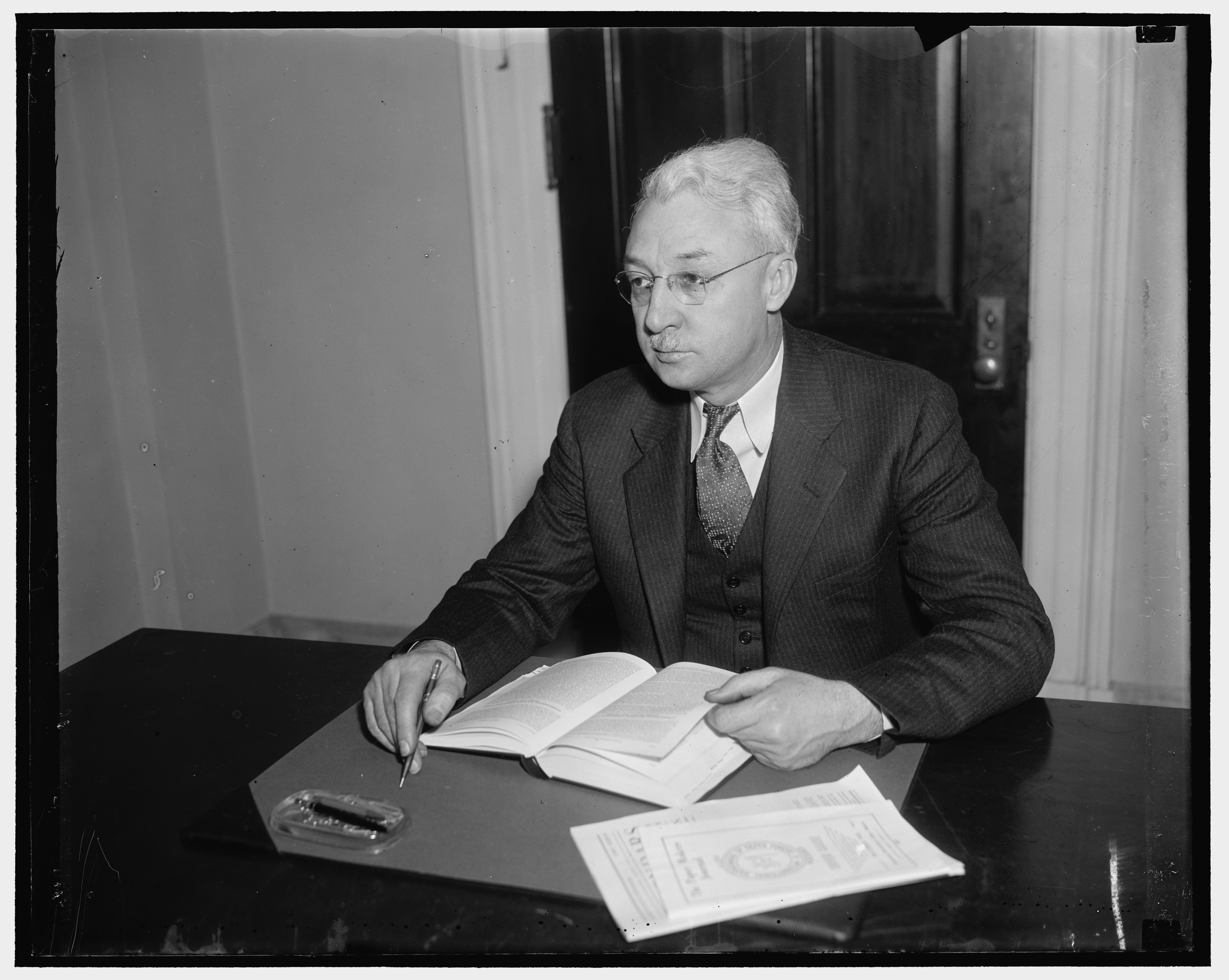
- John Leucke, Michigan Congressman.

Member of the U.S. House of Representatives from Michigan's 11th district
- In office January 3, 1937 – January 3, 1939
- Preceded by: Prentiss M. Brown
- Succeeded by: Frederick Van Ness Bradley

Personal details
- Born: July 4, 1889 Escanaba, Michigan, U.S.
- Died: March 21, 1952 (aged 62) Escanaba, Michigan, U.S.
- Party: Democratic

John Frederick Luecke (July 4, 1889 – March 21, 1952) was a politician from the U.S. state of Michigan.

Luecke was born in Escanaba, Michigan to German immigrants and attended the public elementary schools. He was employed as a commercial and railroad telegrapher and station agent and served as a private in Company A, Signal Corps, United States Army, with the Punitive Expeditionary Force in Mexico in 1916 and 1917.

During the First World War, he served as a sergeant first class, in Company B, Second Field Signal Battalion, American Expeditionary Forces from 1917 to 1919. He was commissioned a second lieutenant, Reserve Corps, while in Germany. He engaged as a mill worker in a paper mill in Escanaba from 1923 to 1936. Luecke was a member of the Escanaba City Council from 1934 to 1936 and a county supervisor of Delta County from 1934 to 1936. He served in the Michigan Senate in 1935 and 1936.

Luecke was elected as a Democrat from Michigan's 11th congressional district to the 75th United States Congress, serving from January 3, 1937, to January 3, 1939. He was an unsuccessful candidate in 1938, losing to Republican Fred Bradley in the general elections.

In 1939, just after leaving Congress, Luecke was appointed commissioner of conciliation for the United States Department of Labor for upper Michigan and northern Wisconsin.

Luecke died aged 62 at his home in Escanaba and is interred there at Lakeview Cemetery.

== Sources ==
- United States Congress. "John F. Luecke (id: L000502)". Biographical Directory of the United States Congress.
- John F. Luecke at The Political Graveyard

U.S. House of Representatives
Preceded by Prentiss M. Brown	United States Representative for the 11th congressional district of Michigan; 1937–1939	Succeeded by Fred Bradley
