= Patrick V. McNamara =

American politician (1894–1966)

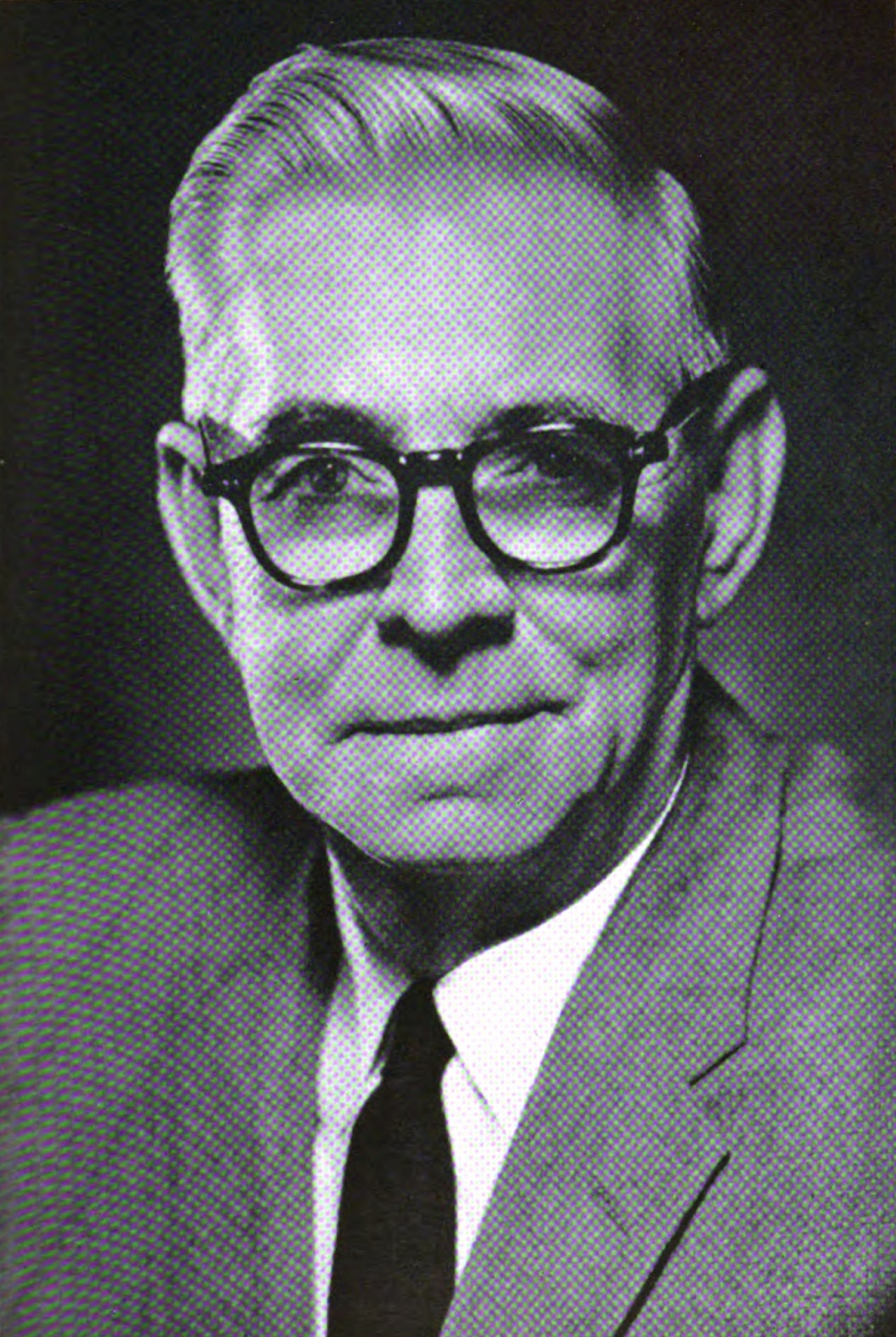
- McNamara in 1963

United States Senator from Michigan
- In office January 3, 1955 – April 30, 1966
- Preceded by: Homer S. Ferguson
- Succeeded by: Robert P. Griffin

Personal details
- Born: Patrick Vincent McNamara; October 4, 1894 North Weymouth, Massachusetts, U.S.
- Died: April 30, 1966 (aged 71) Bethesda, Maryland, U.S.
- Party: Democratic

Patrick Vincent McNamara (October 4, 1894 – April 30, 1966) was an American politician. A Democrat, he served as a United States senator from Michigan from 1955 until his death from a stroke in Bethesda, Maryland in 1966.

== Early life and career ==
Patrick McNamara was born in North Weymouth, Massachusetts, to Patrick Vincent and Mary Jane (née Thynne) McNamara, who were Irish immigrants. The oldest of eight children, he received his early education at public schools in his native town. He attended the local high school for two and a half years before transferring to the Fore River Apprentice School in Quincy, where he learned the trade of pipe fitting. In 1916, he began working as pipe fitter and foreman at the Fore River Shipyard. He then played semi-professional football from 1919 to 1920.

McNamara moved to Detroit, Michigan, where he worked as foreman of a construction crew for the Grinnell Company. He then married Kathleen Kennedy, with whom he had two children. Mary Jane (1922) and Patrick (1925). His wife, Kathleen, died of pneumonia on 8 March 1930 in Detroit. He married Mary Mattee on 3 Sept 1932 in Detroit. He then served as job superintendent for R.L. Spitzley Company (1922–1926) and general superintendent of H. Kelly Company (1926–1930). From 1930 to 1932, he took extension courses at the University of Michigan in Ann Arbor. He was maintenance foreman at a Chrysler plant (1931–1934) before joining the Donald Miller Company. In 1937, he became president of Pipe Fitters Local 636, a position he held until 1955. He also served as vice-president of the Detroit chapter of the American Federation of Labor from 1939 to 1945.

During World War II, he served as rent director of the Office of Price Administration in Detroit from 1942 to 1945. He then joined the Stanley-Carter Company, where he served as superintendent of construction, customer contact man, head of labor relations, and vice-president.

In 1946, McNamara made his first venture into politics with a successful campaign for an unexpired term on the Detroit City Council. He won twenty-one of the city's twenty-three wards, and served until 1947. From 1949 to 1955, he was a member of the Detroit Board of Education.

== U.S. Senate ==
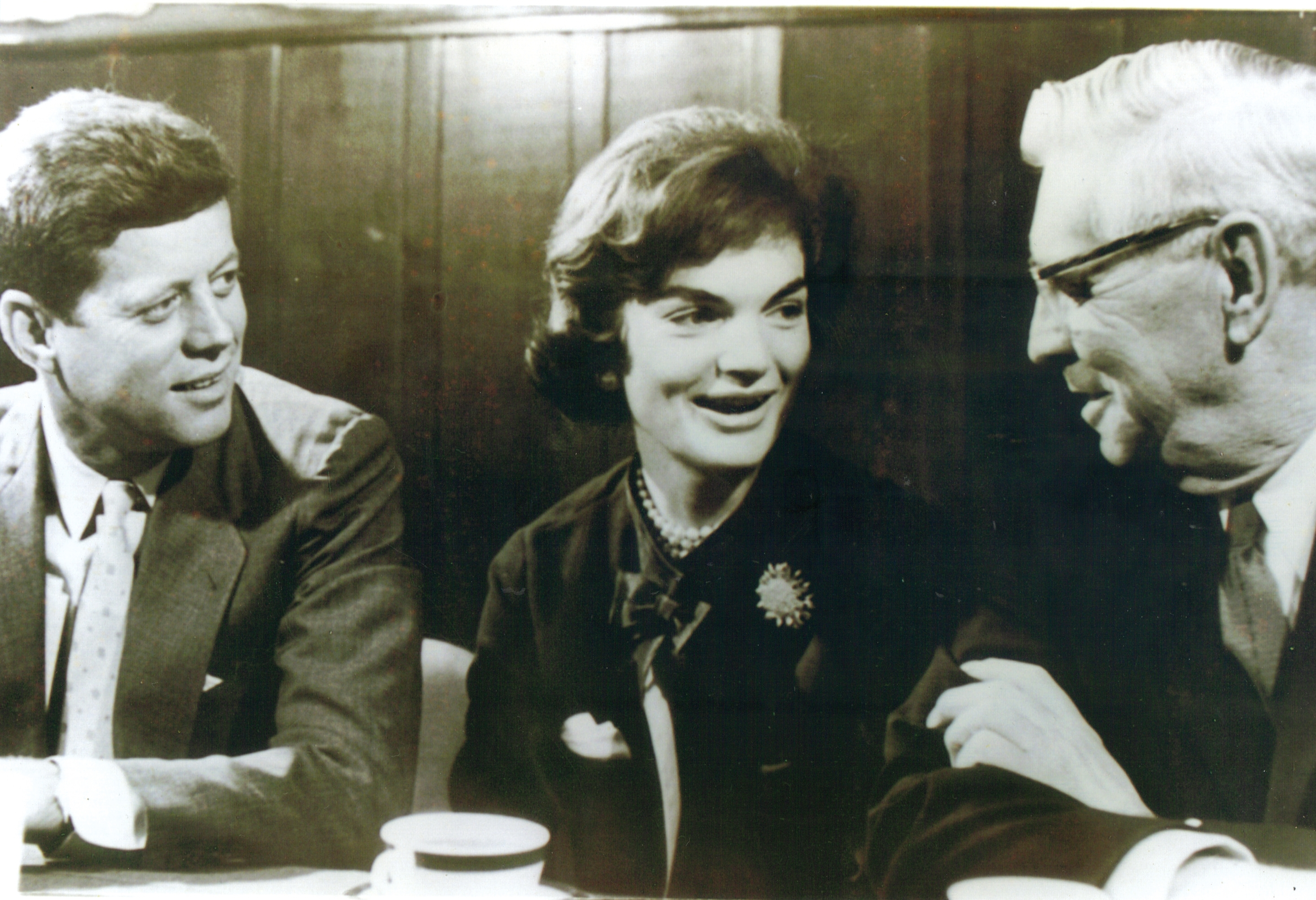
President John F. Kennedy and First Lady Jacqueline Kennedy Onassis meeting with Senator Patrick V. McNamara.

In 1954, McNamara challenged former Senator Blair Moody for the Democratic nomination for a seat in the United States Senate. He was given little chance of defeating Moody by most political analysts, but won the nomination after Moody died two weeks before the primary election. He faced two-term Republican incumbent Homer S. Ferguson in the general election, during which McNamara criticized President Dwight D. Eisenhower's economic, labor, and farm policies. In November, he narrowly defeated Ferguson by a margin of 51%-49%. For the first year of its tenure, he sat on the McClellan Committee (1957–60), which probed organized crime within trade unions. He resigned from the committee and was replaced by Frank Church.

McNamara was reelected over Alvin Morell Bentley in 1960, serving from January 3, 1955, until his death in Bethesda, Maryland. In the 87th Congress, he became the first chairman of the Senate Special Committee on Aging. He also chaired the Senate Public Works Committee in the 88th and 89th Congresses. The 1959 committee hearings which Pat McNamara called on the subject of the health of the elderly began a public debate which led to the creation of Medicare.

McNamara died of a stroke at Bethesda Naval Hospital on April 30, 1966, aged 71, and was interred in Mount Olivet Cemetery in Detroit.

McNamara was a member of Americans for Democratic Action. The Patrick V. McNamara Federal Building in Detroit was named for him.

== Legacy ==
McNamara donated his archival papers to the Walter P. Reuther Library, where they are open to the public for research. The bulk of materials relate to his time in the Senate and his work on the Public Works Committee (chairman, 1963–66), Labor and Public Welfare Committee, Select Committee on Improper Activities in the Labor or Management Field, Select Subcommittee on Poverty, and the Special Committee on Aging. Subjects covered include problems of the aged, civil rights, atomic energy, education, taxes, public works, federal highway acts, and labor. Correspondents include all major political figures of the period and many labor leaders.

== Bibliography ==
- U.S. Congress. Memorial Services Held in the Senate and House of Representatives of the United States, Together with Remarks Presented in Eulogy of Patrick V. McNamara, Late a Senator from Michigan. 89th Cong., 2nd sess., 1966. Washington, D.C.: Government Printing Office, 1967.

== See also ==
- List of members of the United States Congress who died in office (1950–1999)

Party political offices
| Preceded by Frank Eugene Hook | Democratic nominee for U.S. Senator from Michigan (Class 2); 1954, 1960 | Succeeded by G. Mennen Williams |
U.S. Senate
| Preceded by Homer S. Ferguson | U.S. senator (Class 2) from Michigan; 1955–1966; Served alongside: Charles E. Potter, Philip Hart | Succeeded by Robert P. Griffin |
Political offices
| Preceded by Dennis Chavez | Chairman of Senate Public Works Committee; 1962–1966 | Succeeded by Jennings Randolph |
