= 1936 United States Senate election in Michigan =

- November 3, 1936
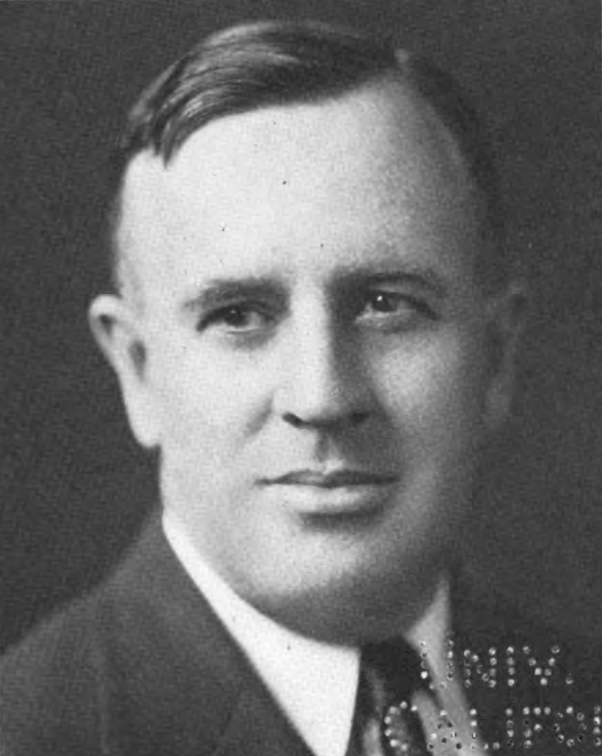

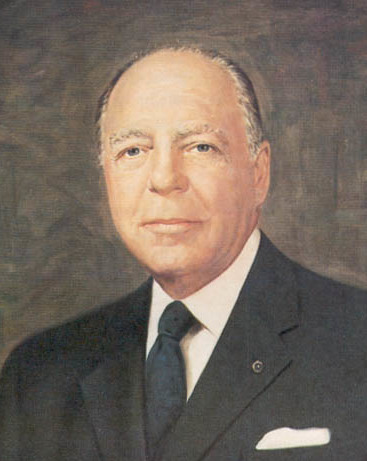
Nominee	Prentiss M. Brown	Wilber M. Brucker
Party	Democratic	Republican
Popular vote	910,937	714,602
Percentage	53.29%	41.80%
- County results Brown: 40–50% 50–60% 60–70% Brucker: 40–50% 50–60% 60–70% 70–80%
U.S. senator before election
James J. Couzens
Republican
Elected U.S. Senator
Prentiss M. Brown
Democratic

The 1936 United States Senate election in Michigan was held on November 3, 1936. Incumbent Republican U.S. Senator James J. Couzens ran for re-election to a third term in office, but was defeated in the Republican primary by Governor Wilber Brucker. Brucker was defeated in the general election by Democratic U.S. Representative Prentiss M. Brown, becoming the first Democrat to win this seat since 1853.

== Republican primary ==
=== Candidates ===
- Wilber M. Brucker, Governor of Michigan
- James J. Couzens, incumbent Senator since 1922

=== Results ===
1936 Republican Senate primary
Party	Candidate	Votes	%
Republican	Wilber M. Brucker	328,560	62.26%
Republican	James J. Couzens (incumbent)	199,204	37.75%
Total votes		357,595	100.00%

== Democratic primary ==
=== Candidates ===
- Prentiss M. Brown, U.S. Representative from St. Ignace
- Ralph W. Liddy
- John Muyskens
- Louis B. Ward, editor of Social Justice and aide to Father Charles Coughlin

=== Results ===
1936 Democratic Senate primary
Party	Candidate	Votes	%
Democratic	Prentiss M. Brown	125,338	36.32%
Democratic	Louis B. Ward	117,872	34.16%
Democratic	Ralph W. Liddy	71,963	20.85%
Democratic	John Muyskens	29,935	8.67%
Total votes		357,595	100.00%

Ward contested the results and ran in the general election as a Third Party candidate.

== General election ==
=== Results ===
1936 U.S. Senate election in Michigan
Party	Candidate	Votes	%	±%
Democratic	Prentiss M. Brown	910,937	53.29%	▲32.38
Republican	Wilber M. Brucker	714,602	41.80%	▼36.35
Third	Louis B. Ward	75,680	4.43%	N/A
Socialist	Roy E. Mathews	4,994	0.29%	▼0.01
Communist	Lawrence Emery	2,145	0.13%	▼0.31
Socialist Labor	Ralph Naylor	510	0.03%	N/A
Commonwealth	Albert B. Sheldon	429	0.03%	N/A
American	Edward N. Lee	147	0.01%	N/A
Total votes		1,709,444	100.00%	
Democratic gain from Republican				

== Aftermath ==
Senator Couzens died on October 22. After his election, Brown was appointed to complete the remaining two months of Couzens's unexpired term.

== See also ==
- 1936 United States Senate elections
