= Homer S. Ferguson =

American politician, diplomat, and judge

Homer Ferguson
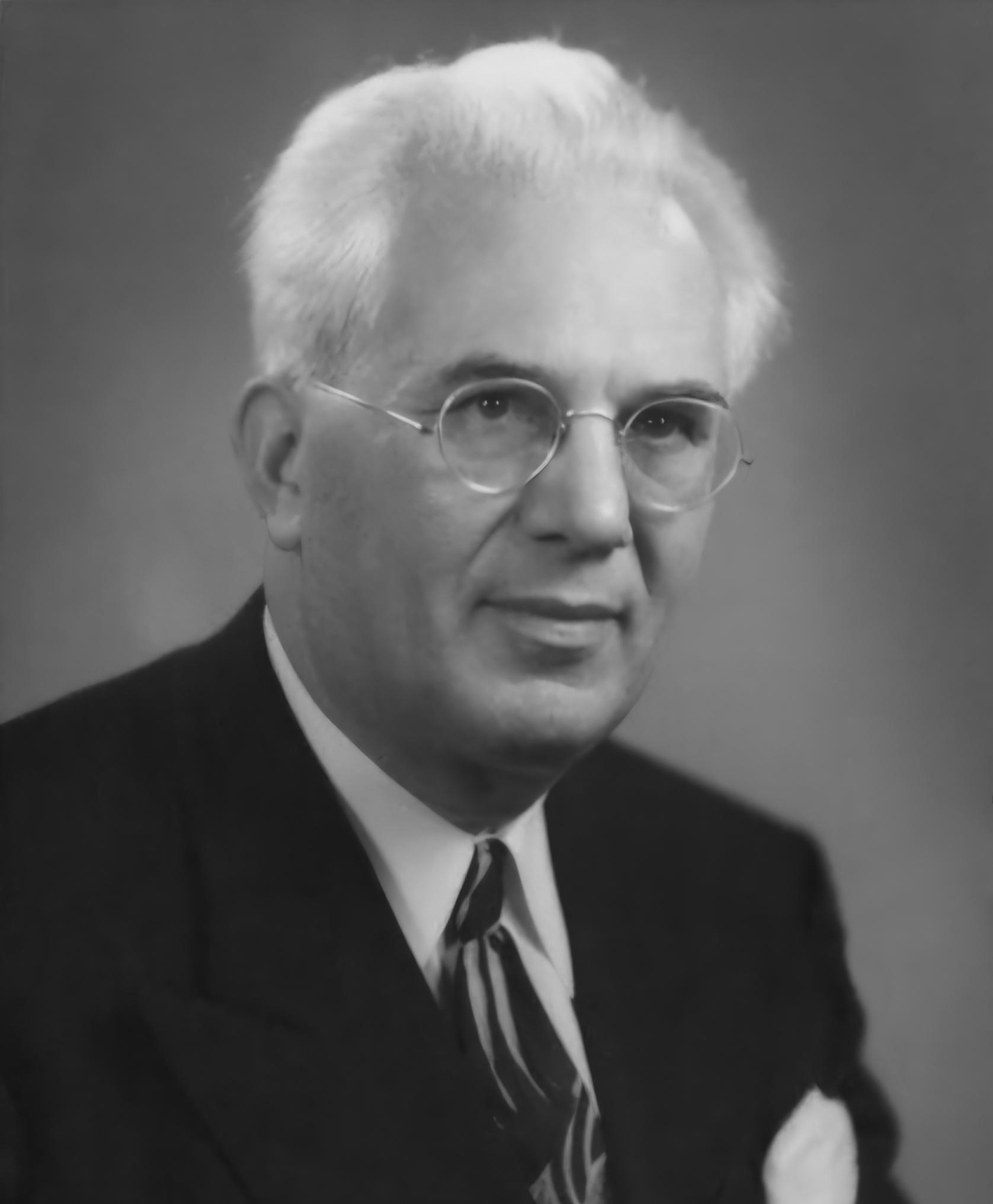

Senior Judge of the United States Court of Appeals for the Armed Forces
- In office 1971–1976

Judge of the United States Court of Appeals for the Armed Forces
- In office April 9, 1956 – December 17, 1971
- Appointed by: Dwight D. Eisenhower
- Preceded by: Paul William Brosman
- Succeeded by: Robert Morton Duncan

United States Ambassador to the Philippines
- In office April 12, 1955 – March 23, 1956
- President: Dwight D. Eisenhower
- Preceded by: Raymond A. Spruance
- Succeeded by: Albert F. Nufer

Chair of the Senate Republican Policy Committee
- In office August 4, 1953 – January 3, 1955
- Leader: William Knowland
- Preceded by: William Knowland
- Succeeded by: Styles Bridges

United States Senator from Michigan
- In office January 3, 1943 – January 3, 1955
- Preceded by: Prentiss M. Brown
- Succeeded by: Patrick V. McNamara

Personal details
- Born: Homer Samuel Ferguson; February 25, 1889 Harrison City, Pennsylvania, U.S.
- Died: December 17, 1982 (aged 93) Grosse Pointe, Michigan, U.S.
- Party: Republican
- Spouse: Myrtle
- Education: University of Pittsburgh; University of Michigan, Ann Arbor (LLB)

Homer Samuel Ferguson (February 25, 1889 – December 17, 1982) was an American attorney, professor, judge, United States senator from Michigan, ambassador to the Philippines, and later a judge on the United States Court of Military Appeals.

== Education and early career ==
Ferguson attended public schools and the University of Pittsburgh. He graduated from the University of Michigan at Ann Arbor in 1913, was admitted to the bar the same year and commenced practice in Detroit. He was judge of the circuit court for Wayne County, Michigan, from 1929 to 1942 and also professor of law at Detroit College of Law (now part of Michigan State University) from 1929 to 1939.

== Senator ==
Ferguson was elected as a Republican to the United States Senate in 1942. He was re-elected in 1948 over Democrat Frank E. Hook in a year dominated by the Democratic party's upset wins. The 1948 election was contested by Hook, who alleged fraud; a subcommittee uncovered unethical practices in the election cycle, even though it exonerated Ferguson, who was seated.

He unsuccessfully ran for reelection to a third-term in 1954, having been defeated by Democrat Patrick V. McNamara.

While in the Senate, he served as chairman of the Republican Policy Committee in the 83rd Congress.

Ferguson was influential in the creation of the Joint Committee on the Investigation of the Pearl Harbor Attack, which consolidated numerous military and civilian investigations, took new testimony, and published a 39-part report comprising over 20,000 pages. Ferguson signed the minority report, which called for senior military and civilian leaders such as General George Marshall and President Franklin D. Roosevelt to be held culpable.

In 1943, Ferguson was one of 12 senators who sponsored or co-sponsored the Rescue Resolution, which would have declared that Congress "recommends and urges the creation by the President of a commission of diplomatic, economic, and military experts to formulate and effectuate a plan of immediate action designed to save the surviving Jewish people of Europe from extinction at the hands of Nazi Germany."

In 1948, he served as chairman of the Investigations Subcommittee of the Committee on Expenditures in Executive Departments, which held hearings on such matters as export control violations, for which Soviet spy William Remington was called in to testify; the trial of Nazi war criminal Ilse Koch; and the Mississippi Democratic Party's sale of postal jobs, which Mississippians from rural areas attested to purchasing. On July 30, 1948, his committee heard testimony from ex-Soviet spy Elizabeth Bentley. Bentley testified before the House Un-American Activities Committee the next day, followed by Whittaker Chambers a few days later – setting off the Hiss Case, used by both Richard Nixon and Joseph McCarthy for their own political agendas.

Ferguson sponsored an anti-lynching bill, which was approved by the Senate Judiciary Committee in June 1949. The House of Representatives had approved several anti-lynching bills. Due to opposition from Southern Democrats, no anti-lynching bill was ever approved by the full Senate.

He introduced the Senate version of the bill that inserted "under God" into the Pledge of Allegiance in 1954. Michigan's 17th congressional district United States House of Representatives Republican Charles G. Oakman had previously introduced a House version. The bill became law on Flag Day, June 14, 1954.

Also in 1954, Ferguson proposed several amendments to the Bricker Amendment.

== Later life ==
Ferguson served as United States Ambassador to the Philippines from 1955 to 1956 and was judge of the United States Court of Military Appeals in Washington, D.C., from 1956 to until his retirement 1971. He served as senior judge on the United States Court of Military Appeals from 1971 to 1976.

In 1976, he retired and moved back to Michigan and resided in Grosse Pointe until his death in 1982.

Ferguson's involvement behind the scenes in influencing the failed investigation, trial, and slander of Preston Tucker by the Securities and Exchange Commission has long been speculated. Ferguson is the main antagonist of the 1988 biopic film Tucker: The Man and His Dream. In the film, he is played by Lloyd Bridges, who worked alongside his son Jeff Bridges, who played Tucker.

== Sources ==
- United States Congress. "Homer S. Ferguson (id: F000081)". Biographical Directory of the United States Congress.
- The Political Graveyard

Party political offices
Preceded by Wilber M. Brucker	Republican nominee for U.S. Senator from Michigan (Class 2); 1942, 1948, 1954	Succeeded by Alvin Morell Bentley
Preceded by William F. Knowland	Chair of the Senate Republican Policy Committee; 1953–1955	Succeeded by Styles Bridges
U.S. Senate
Preceded by Prentiss M. Brown	U.S. Senator (Class 2) from Michigan; 1943–1955; Served alongside: Arthur Vandenberg, Blair Moody, Charles E. Potter	Succeeded by Patrick V. McNamara
Diplomatic posts
Preceded by Raymond A. Spruance	United States Ambassador to the Philippines; 1955–1956	Succeeded by Albert F. Nufer
Legal offices
Preceded by Paul William Brosman	Judge of the United States Court of Appeals for the Armed Forces; 1956–1971	Succeeded by Robert Morton Duncan
