= Frederick Van Ness Bradley =

American politician (1898–1947)

Frederick Bradley
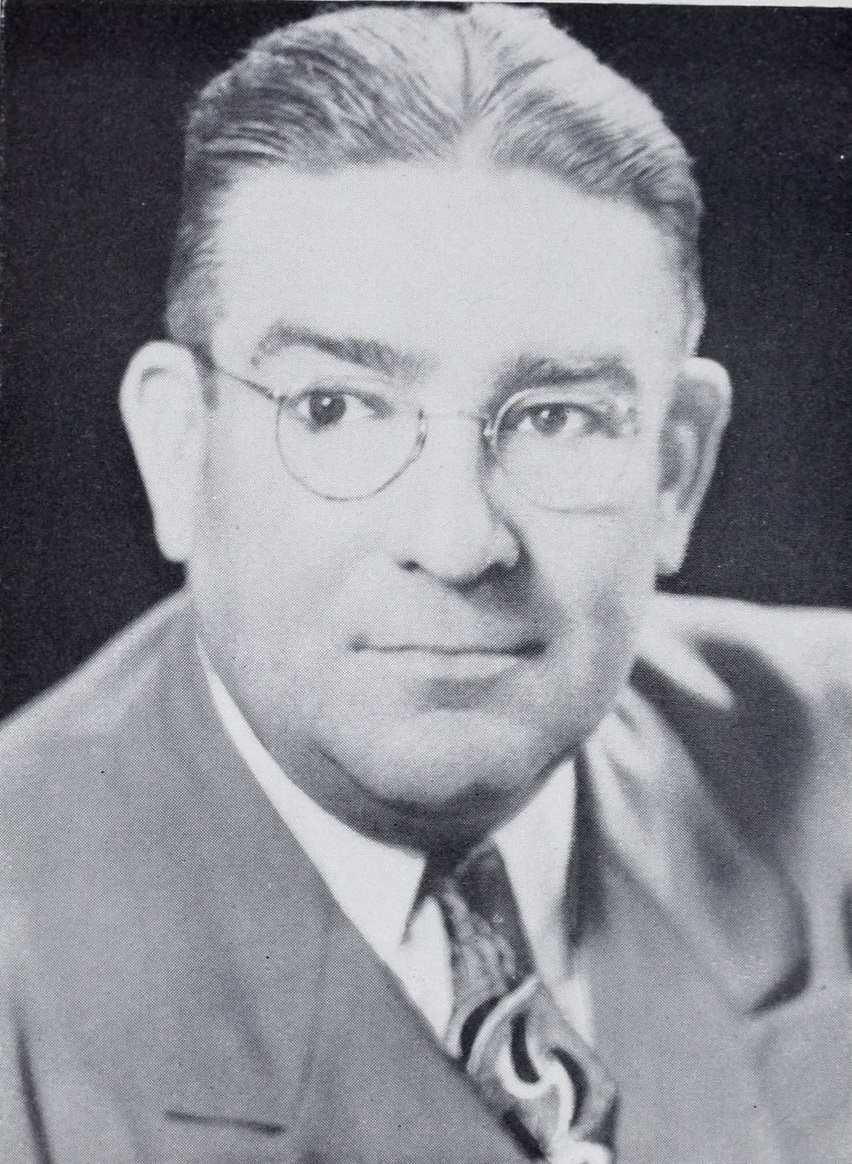
- Frontispiece of 1950s Frederick Van Ness Bradley, Late a Representative

Member of the U.S. House of Representatives from Michigan's 11th district
- In office January 3, 1939 – May 24, 1947
- Preceded by: John Luecke
- Succeeded by: Charles E. Potter

Personal details
- Born: Frederick Van Ness Bradley; April 12, 1898 Chicago, Illinois, U.S.
- Died: May 24, 1947 (aged 49) New London, Connecticut, U.S.
- Resting place: Rogers City Memorial Park, Rogers City, Michigan
- Party: Republican
- Spouse: Marcia Marie Hillidge (m. 1922–1947, his death)
- Children: 1
- Education: Cornell University
- Occupation: Sales representative Purchasing agent

Frederick Van Ness Bradley (April 12, 1898 – May 24, 1947) was an American politician who served as the U.S. representative for Michigan's 11th congressional district from 1939 until his death in 1947. He was a member of the Republican Party.

== Early life and career ==
Bradley was born in Chicago and moved to Rogers City, Michigan, in 1910 where he attended the public schools and graduated from Rogers City High School.

=== World War I ===
He attended Montclair Academy in Montclair, New Jersey, and in 1918 joined the United States Army for World War I. Bradley served in the Student Army Training Corps at Plattsburgh Barracks, New York.

=== Business career ===
He graduated from Cornell University in 1921. His father was president of the Michigan Limestone and Chemical Company, and Bradley worked for the company as a salesman in Buffalo, New York, from 1921 to 1923. He was a purchasing agent with Bradley Transportation Company in Rogers City, Michigan from 1924 to 1938.

== Congress ==
In 1938, Bradley was the successful Republican nominee to represent Michigan's 11th congressional district, defeating incumbent Democrat John Luecke. He was reelected four times and served from January 3, 1939, until his death. He was chairman of the Committee on Merchant Marine and Fisheries in the 80th Congress. With his longtime interest in Great Lakes shipping, Bradley was the legislative sponsor behind the construction of the Round Island Passage Light.

== Death and burial ==
Bradley died in New London, Connecticut, on May 24, 1947, while there to attend a meeting of the United States Coast Guard Academy board of visitors. He was interred at Rogers City Memorial Park.

== Family ==
In 1922, Bradley married Marcia Marie Hillidge of Front Royal, Virginia. They were the parents of a son, Carl, who died in 1938 at the age of two.

== See also ==
- List of members of the United States Congress who died in office (1900–1949)

U.S. House of Representatives
Preceded by John F. Luecke	United States Representative for the 11th congressional district of Michigan; 1939–1947	Succeeded by Charles E. Potter
