= 1942 United States Senate election in Michigan =

- November 2, 1942
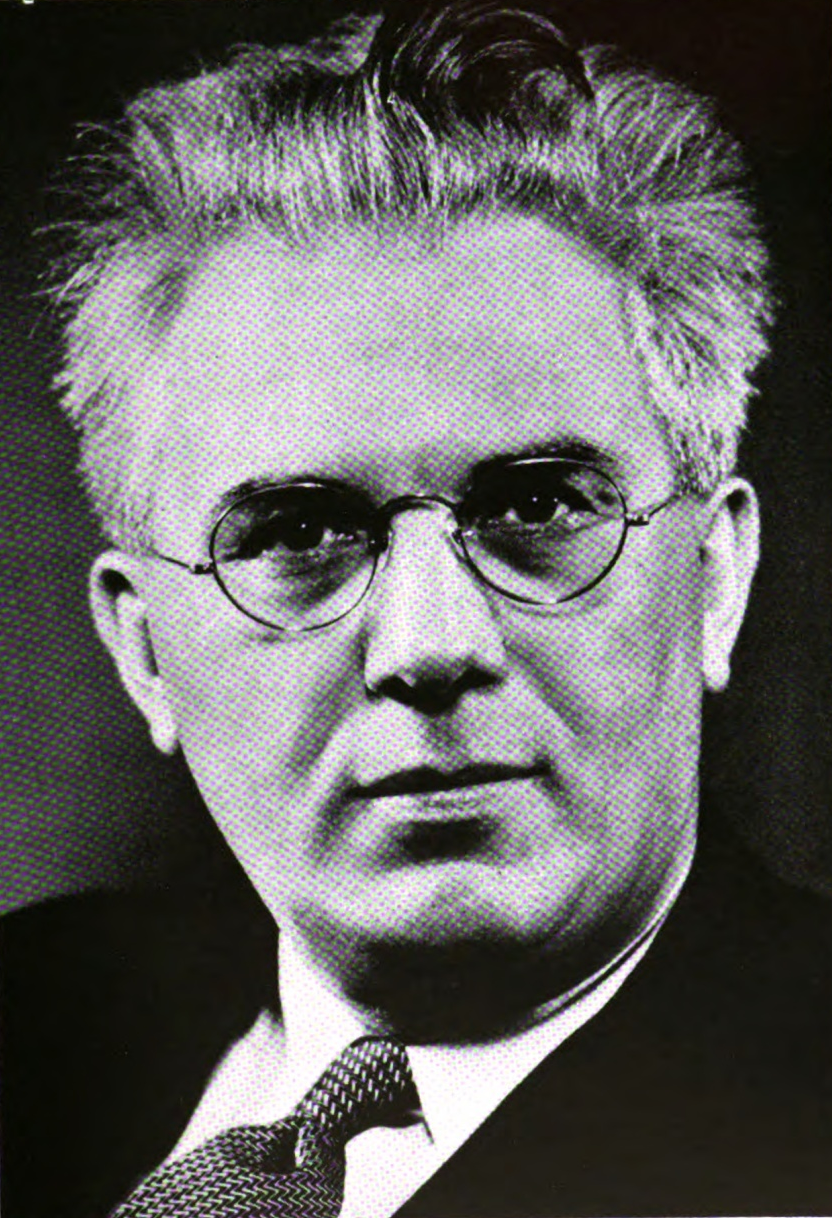

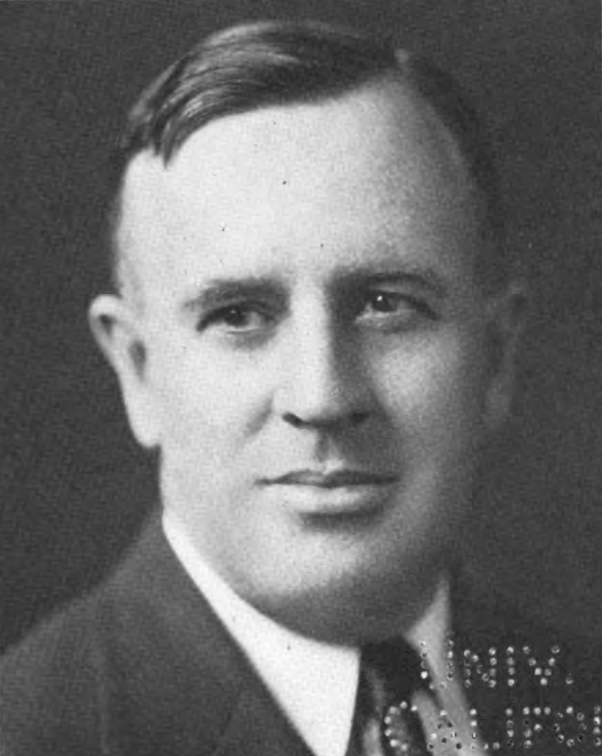
Nominee	Homer S. Ferguson	Prentiss M. Brown
Party	Republican	Democratic
Popular vote	589,652	561,595
Percentage	49.55%	47.20%
- County results Ferguson: 40–50% 50–60% 60–70% 70–80% Brown: 40–50% 50–60% 60–70%
U.S. senator before election
Prentiss M. Brown
Democratic
Elected U.S. Senator
Homer S. Ferguson
Republican

The 1942 United States Senate election in Michigan was held on November 2, 1942. Incumbent Democratic U.S. Senator Prentiss M. Brown ran for re-election to second term in office, but was defeated by Republican Homer S. Ferguson.

== Republican primary ==
=== Candidates ===
- Elton R. Eaton, State Representative from Plymouth
- Homer S. Ferguson, Wayne County Circuit Court Judge
- Gerald L. K. Smith, minister and founder of the defunct Union Party

=== Results ===
1942 Republican Senate primary
Party	Candidate	Votes	%
Republican	Homer S. Ferguson	201,505	56.35%
Republican	Gerald L. K. Smith	112,444	31.45%
Republican	Elton R. Eaton	43,646	12.21%
Total votes		357,595	100.00%

== General election ==
=== Results ===
1942 U.S. Senate election in Michigan
Party	Candidate	Votes	%	±%
Republican	Homer S. Ferguson	589,652	49.55%	▲1.13
Democratic	Prentiss M. Brown (incumbent)	561,595	47.20%	▲1.31
Independent Republican	Gerald L. K. Smith (write-in)	32,173	2.70%	N/A
Prohibition	Leroy M. Powell	6,526	0.55%	
Total votes		1,189,946	100.00%	
Republican gain from Democratic				

== See also ==
- 1942 United States Senate elections
