= Prentiss M. Brown =

American politician

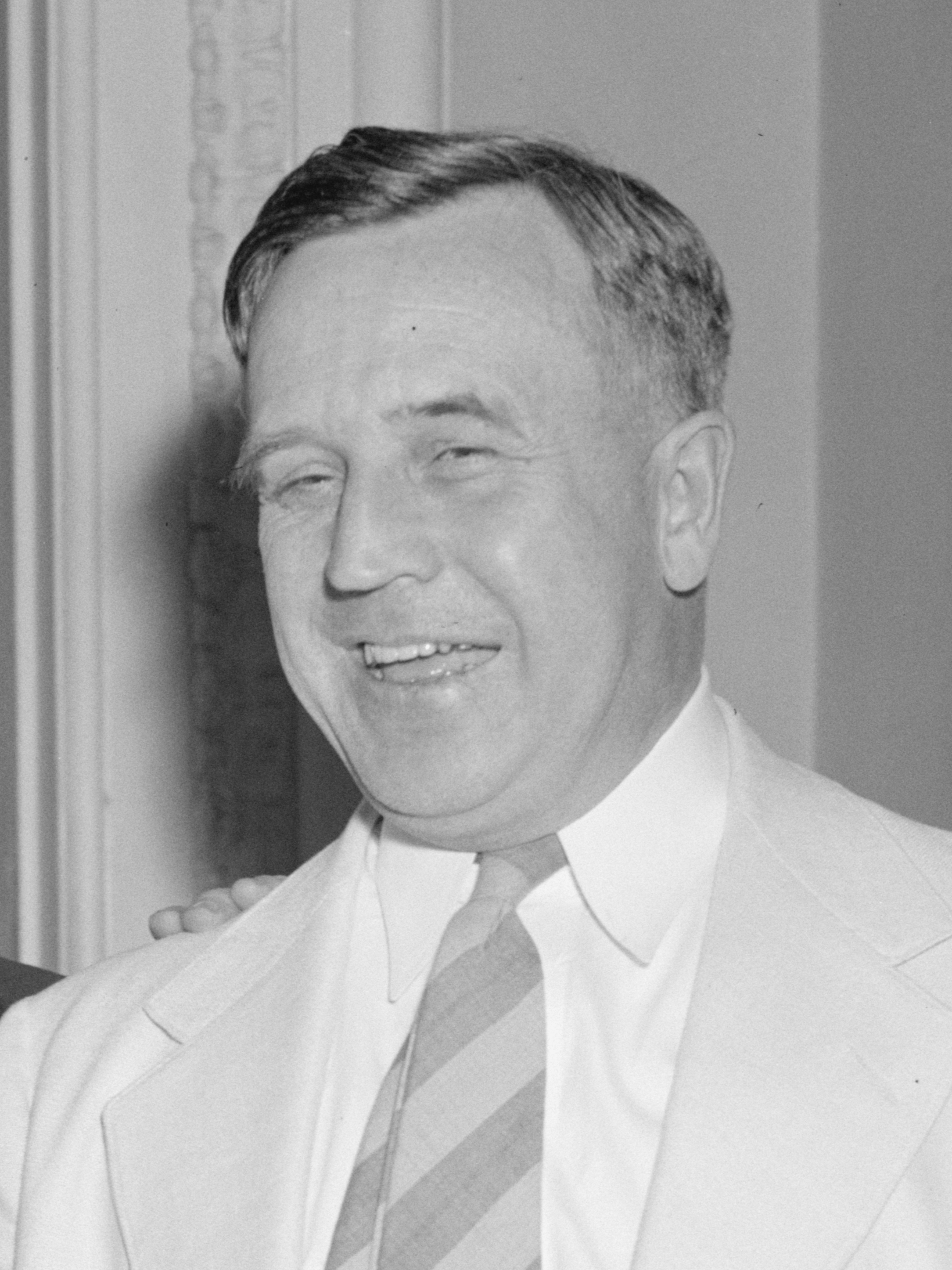

United States Senator from Michigan
- In office November 19, 1936 – January 3, 1943
- Preceded by: James J. Couzens
- Succeeded by: Homer S. Ferguson

Member of the U.S. House of Representatives from Michigan's 11th district
- In office March 4, 1933 – November 18, 1936
- Preceded by: Frank P. Bohn
- Succeeded by: John F. Luecke

Administrator of the Office of Price Administration
- In office 1943
- President: Franklin D. Roosevelt
- Preceded by: Leon Henderson
- Succeeded by: Chester Bowles

Personal details
- Born: Prentiss Marsh Brown; June 18, 1889 St. Ignace, Michigan, U.S.
- Died: December 19, 1973 (aged 84) St. Ignace, Michigan, U.S.
- Resting place: Lakeside Cemetery
- Party: Democratic
- Spouse: Marion Walker
- Children: Mariana Rudolph, Ruth Evashevski, James J. Brown, Barbara Laing, Patricia Watson, Prentiss M. Brown, Jr., and Paul Walker Brown
- Education: University of Illinois at Urbana-Champaign; Albion College

Prentiss Marsh Brown (June 18, 1889 – December 19, 1973) was an American lawyer and politician who served three full and one partial term as a Democratic U.S. Representative and Senator from the state of Michigan from 1936 to 1943.

== Biography ==
Brown was born in St. Ignace, Michigan and attended the public schools there. He attended the University of Illinois at Urbana-Champaign and graduated from Albion College in Albion, Michigan in 1911. He studied law and was admitted to the bar in 1914 and commenced practice in St. Ignace.

=== Personal life ===
Brown married Marion Walker in 1916. The couple had a total of seven children. They are Mariana Rudolph, Ruth Evashevski, James J. Brown, Barbara Laing, Patricia Watson, Prentiss M. Brown, Jr., and Paul Walker Brown.

=== Early career ===
Brown was prosecuting attorney of Mackinac County from 1914 to 1926 and the city attorney of St. Ignace from 1916 to 1928.

He was an unsuccessful candidate for election in 1924 to the United States House of Representatives and in 1928 for election as justice of the Michigan Supreme Court. He was a member of the State Board of Law Examiners from 1930 to 1942.

=== Congress ===
Brown was elected as a Democrat from Michigan's 11th congressional district to the United States House of Representatives for the 73rd Congress and was reelected to the 74th Congress, serving from March 4, 1933, until his resignation, effective November 18, 1936.

He was elected as a Democrat on November 3, 1936, to the United States Senate for the term beginning January 3, 1937, but was subsequently appointed to the United States Senate to fill the vacancy caused by the death of James Couzens for the term ending January 3, 1937. In total, he served from November 19, 1936, to January 3, 1943.

He was chairman of the U.S. Senate Committee on Claims in the Seventy-seventh Congress. He was also a member of the Banking and Currency Committee, and in this capacity was instrumental in helping Franklin D. Roosevelt achieve his desired wage and farm price controls. He was an unsuccessful candidate for re-election in 1942.

=== After Congress ===
In December 1942, Roosevelt selected Brown to take over as administrator of the Office of Price Administration, replacing Leon Henderson, whose tenure as administrator was listed as one of the major reasons for Democratic losses in the 1942 elections. In 1943 he resumed the practice of law in both Washington, D.C., and Detroit, Michigan. He also served as chairman of the Detroit Edison Company.

In 1951, Brown was named chairman of the new Mackinac Bridge Authority and served until his death. During his chairmanship, this authority oversaw the construction of Michigan's Mackinac Bridge. He once stated during a radio interview that he came up with the idea for the Mackinac Bridge after an unusually bitter winter one day disrupted his commute to work by ferry and forced him to cross the strait on the brittle icy lake surface.

=== Death and burial ===
Brown died in St. Ignace at the age of 84 and is interred there at Lakeside Cemetery.

=== Family ===
Two of Brown's children were also active in Democratic party politics. His son, Prentiss M. Brown, Jr., ran unsuccessfully for Congress several times, in 1952, 1956, 1958, and 1960, and was the city attorney for St. Ignace for 50 years. Paul Walker Brown was a member of the Board of Regents of the University of Michigan from 1971 until 1994, and ran unsuccessfully for lieutenant governor in 1974.

=== Honors ===
- He has been called the "father of the Mackinac Bridge." His import was so great that his visage was placed on a special memorial bridge token created by the Mackinac Bridge Authority.
- In 2004, Albion College renamed its Honors Institute the Prentiss M. Brown Honors Institute in memory of the 1911 alumnus.
- Between 1976 and 2001, the stretch of Interstate 75 between the Mackinac Bridge and Sault Ste. Marie, Michigan, was known as the Prentiss M. Brown Memorial Highway. Since 2001, the Prentiss M. Brown Memorial Highway is designated as the name of I-75 in Mackinac County on the north side of the Mackinac Bridge.
- His accomplishments are commemorated as a "Michigan Legal Milestone" erected by the State Bar of Michigan.
- He is prominently featured in the PBS documentary "Building the Mighty Mac" by LA filmmaker Mark Howell.

Party political offices
Preceded by Thomas A. E. Weadock	Democratic nominee for U.S. Senator from Michigan (Class 2); 1936, 1942	Succeeded by Frank Eugene Hook
U.S. House of Representatives
Preceded by Frank P. Bohn	Member of the U.S. House of Representatives from Michigan's 11th congressional district March 4, 1933 – November 18, 1936	Succeeded by John F. Luecke
U.S. Senate
Preceded by James J. Couzens	U.S. senator (Class 2) from Michigan; November 19, 1936 – January 3, 1943; Served alongside: Arthur Vandenberg	Succeeded by Homer S. Ferguson
Government offices
Preceded by Leon Henderson	Administrator of the Office of Price Administration; 1943	Succeeded by Chester Bowles
