= 1954 United States Senate election in Michigan =

- November 2, 1954
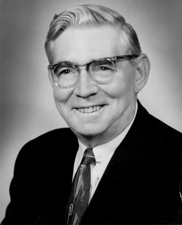

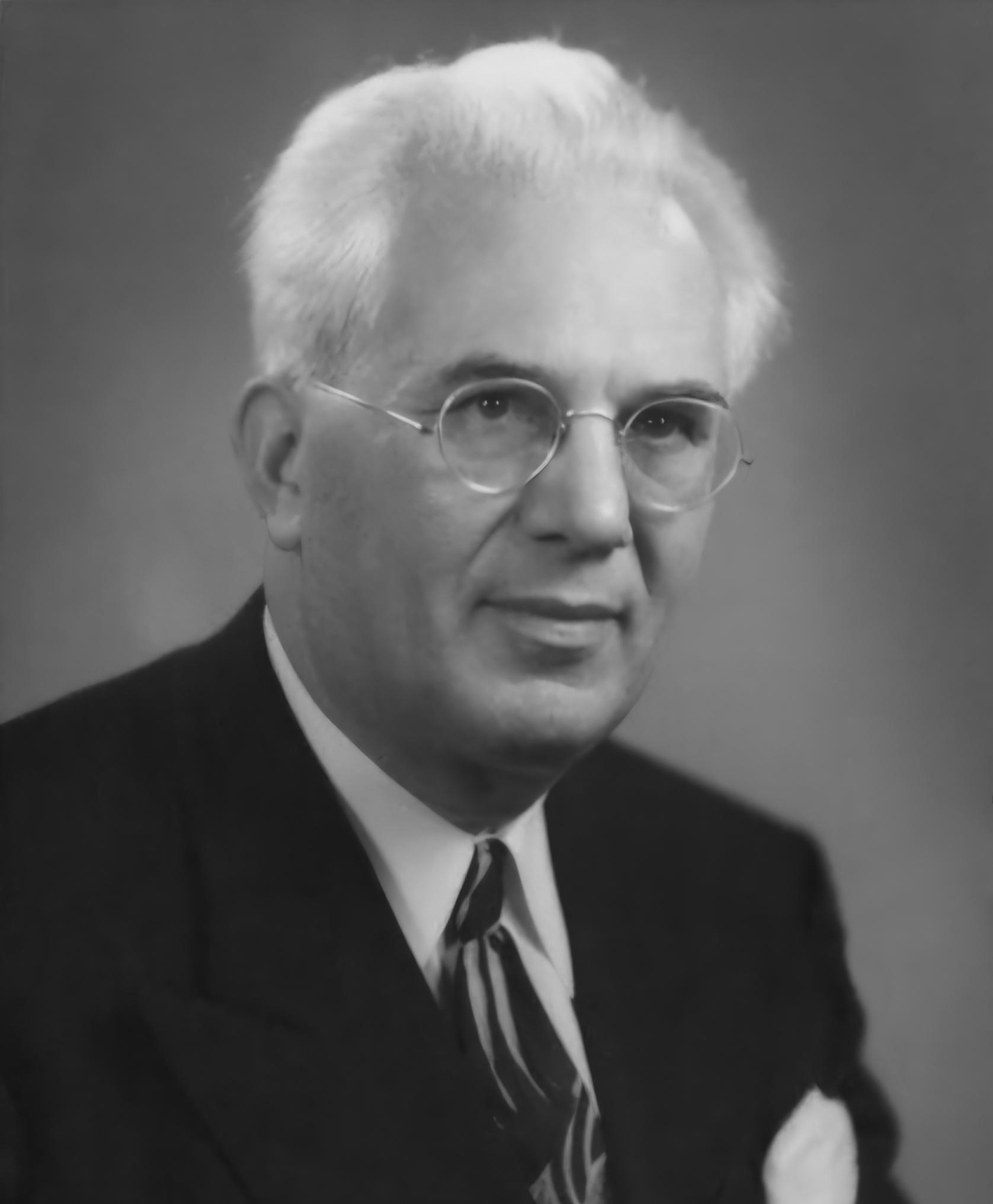
Nominee	Patrick V. McNamara	Homer S. Ferguson
Party	Democratic	Republican
Popular vote	1,088,550	1,049,420
Percentage	50.75%	48.93%
- County results McNamara: 50–60% 60–70% Ferguson: 50–60% 60–70% 70–80%
U.S. senator before election
Homer S. Ferguson
Republican
Elected U.S. Senator
Patrick V. McNamara
Democratic

The 1954 United States Senate election in Michigan was held on November 2, 1954. Incumbent Republican U.S. Senator Homer S. Ferguson ran for re-election to a third term, but was defeated by the Democratic Detroit Board of Education member Patrick V. McNamara.

== Democratic primary ==
=== Candidates ===
- Patrick V. McNamara, member of the Detroit Board of Education
- Blair Moody, former interim Senator (1951–52) (died July 20, 1954)

=== Campaign ===
The campaign was cut short abruptly when Blair Moody died of a heart attack fourteen days before the August 3 primary.

=== Results ===
1954 Democratic Senate primary
Party	Candidate	Votes	%
Democratic	Patrick V. McNamara	226,686	64.21%
Democratic	Blair Moody (deceased)	126,335	35.78%
Total votes		353,046	100.00%

== General election ==
=== Results ===
1954 U.S. Senate election in Michigan
Party	Candidate	Votes	%	±%
Democratic	Patrick V. McNamara	1,088,550	50.75%	▲2.24
Republican	Homer S. Ferguson (incumbent)	1,049,420	48.93%	▼1.75
Prohibition	Leroy M. Lowell	4,841	0.23%	▼0.36
Socialist Labor	James Sim	1,126	0.05%	▼0.02
Socialist Workers	Rita Shaw	902	0.04%	▼0.03
Write-in		1	0.00%	Steady
Total votes		2,144,840	100.00%	
Democratic gain from Republican				

== See also ==
- 1954 United States Senate elections
