= 1948 United States Senate election in Michigan =

- November 2, 1948
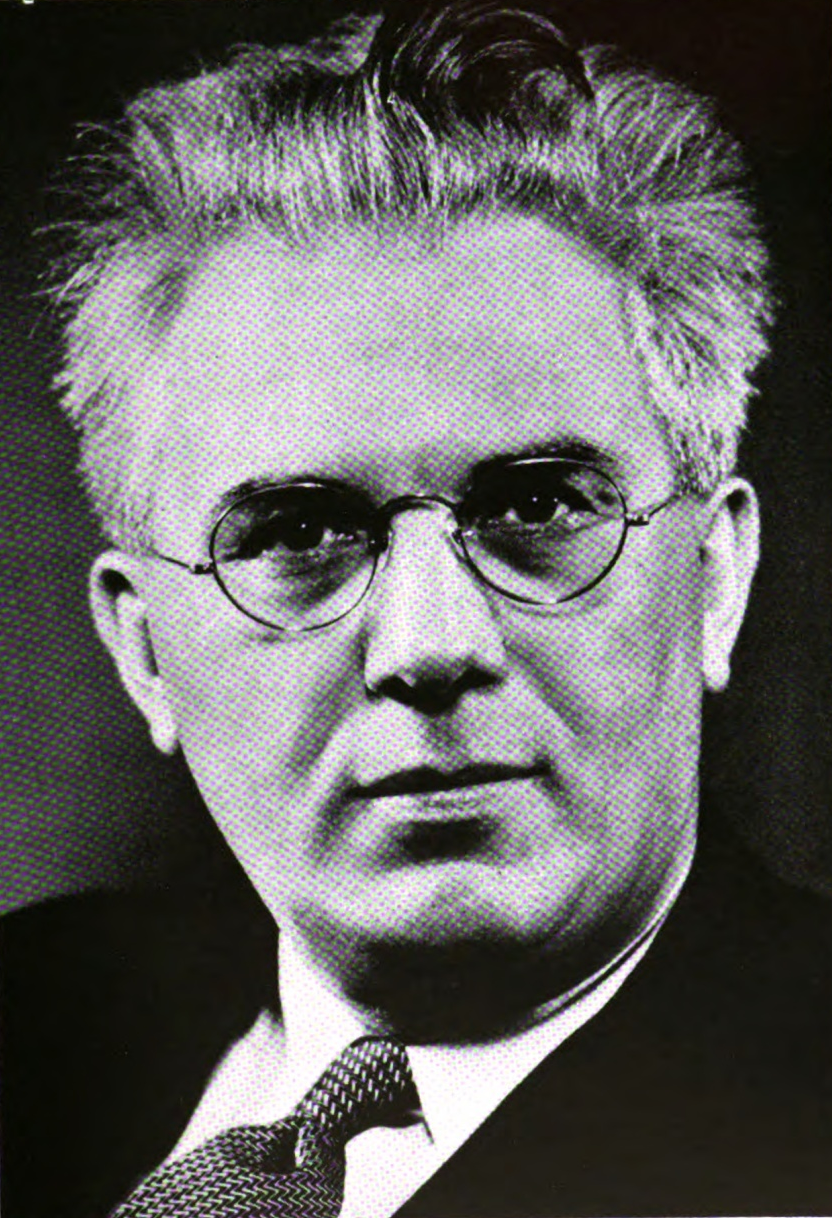

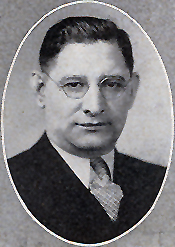
Nominee	Homer S. Ferguson	Frank E. Hook
Party	Republican	Democratic
Popular vote	1,045,156	1,000,329
Percentage	50.68%	48.51%
- County results Ferguson: 40–50% 50–60% 60–70% 70–80% 80–90% Hook: 50–60% 60–70%
U.S. senator before election
Homer S. Ferguson
Republican
Elected U.S. Senator
Homer S. Ferguson
Republican

The 1948 United States Senate election in Michigan was held on November 2, 1948. Incumbent Republican U.S. Senator Homer S. Ferguson was re-elected to a second term in office over U.S. Representative Frank E. Hook.

== General election ==
=== Candidates ===
- Genora Dollinger
- Homer S. Ferguson, incumbent U.S. Senator since 1943 (Republican)
- Thomas A. Grove (Socialist Labor)
- Frank E. Hook, U.S. Representative from the Upper Peninsula (Democratic)
- Harold A. Lindahl (Prohibition)
- Michael Magee (Socialist)

=== Results ===
1948 U.S. Senate election in Michigan
Party	Candidate	Votes	%	±%
Republican	Homer S. Ferguson (incumbent)	1,045,156	50.68%	▲1.13
Democratic	Frank E. Hook	1,000,329	48.51%	▲1.31
Prohibition	Harold A. Lindahl	12,146	0.59%	▲0.04
Socialist	Michael Magee	2,160	0.11%	
Socialist Labor	Theos A. Grove	1,418	0.07%	N/A
Socialist Workers	Genora Dollinger	886	0.04%	N/A
Total votes		2,062,095	100.00%	
Republican hold				

== See also ==
- 1948 United States Senate elections
