= 1960 United States Senate election in Michigan =

- November 8, 1960
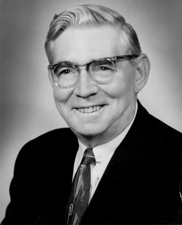

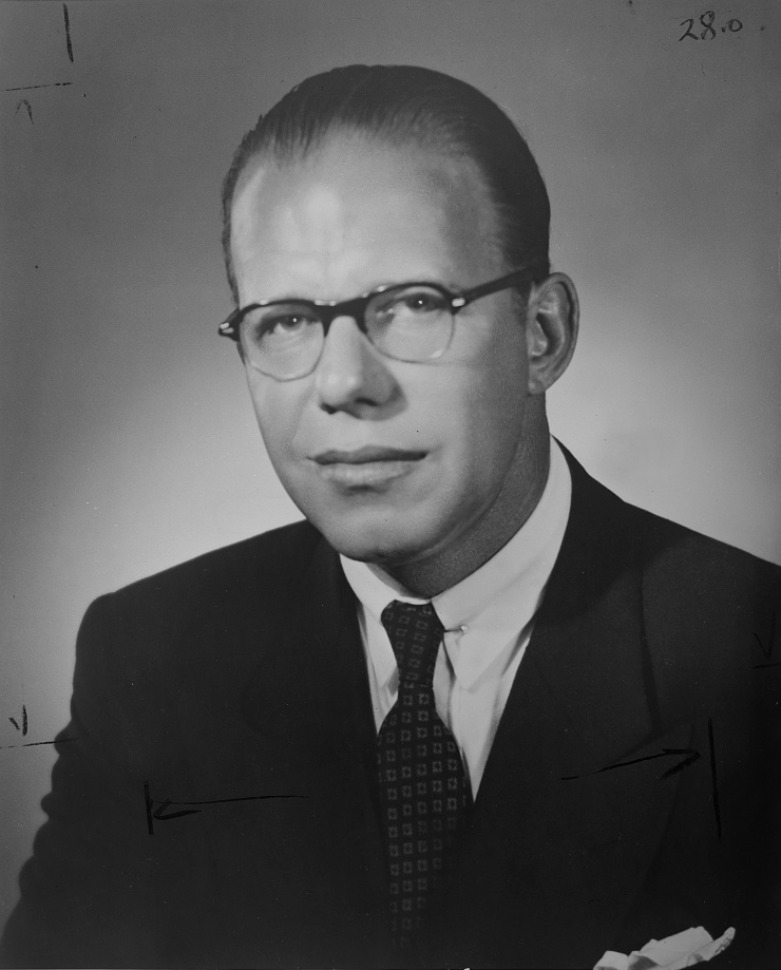
Nominee	Patrick V. McNamara	Alvin M. Bentley
Party	Democratic	Republican
Popular vote	1,669,179	1,548,873
Percentage	51.73%	48.00%
- County results McNamara: 50–60% 60–70% Bentley: 50–60% 60–70% 70–80%
U.S. senator before election
Patrick V. McNamara
Democratic
Elected U.S. Senator
Patrick V. McNamara
Democratic

The 1960 United States Senate election in Michigan was held on November 8, 1960. Incumbent Democratic U.S. Senator Patrick McNamara was re-elected to a second term in office, defeating U.S. Representative Alvin M. Bentley.

== Republican primary ==
=== Candidates ===
- Alvin Morell Bentley, U.S. Representative from Owosso
- Donald S. Leonard, attorney and nominee for Governor in 1954

=== Results ===
1960 Republican Senate primary
Party	Candidate	Votes	%
Republican	Alvin Morell Bentley	344,043	72.03%
Republican	Donald S. Leonard	133,562	27.97%
Write-in		7	0.00%
Total votes		477,612	100.00%

== General election ==
=== Results ===
1960 U.S. Senate election in Michigan
Party	Candidate	Votes	%	±%
Democratic	Patrick V. McNamara (incumbent)	1,669,179	51.73%	▲0.98
Republican	Alvin Morell Bentley	1,548,873	48.00%	▼0.93
Socialist Workers	Frank Lovell	3,282	0.10%	▲0.06
Prohibition	Rollin M. Severance	2,273	0.07%	▼0.16
Socialist Labor	James Sim	1,565	0.05%	Steady
Independent	Alvin Reynolds	1,465	0.05%	N/A
Total votes		3,226,637	100.00%	
Democratic hold				

== See also ==
- 1960 United States Senate elections
