= Justin R. Whiting =

American politician (1847–1903)

Justin Rice Whiting
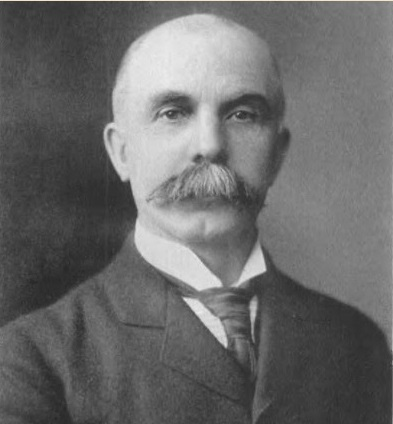
- From 1900's Men of Progress: Embracing Biographical Sketches of Representative Michigan Men

Member of the U.S. House of Representatives from Michigan's 7th district
- In office March 4, 1887 – March 3, 1895
- Preceded by: Ezra C. Carleton
- Succeeded by: Horace G. Snover

Personal details
- Born: February 18, 1847 Bath, New York, U.S.
- Died: January 31, 1903 (aged 55) St. Clair, Michigan, U.S.
- Party: Democratic
- Spouse: Emily F. Owen
- Children: 10
- Parent(s): Col. Henry & Pamela (Rice) Whiting
- Education: University of Michigan
- Occupation: St. Clair Mineral Springs Co., Ward Lumber Co of Chicago; J.R. Whiting and Co., Alderman
- Committees: Federal Relations, Education and Public Schools, Michigan Institution for the Deaf and Dumb, Insurance, Engrossment and Enrollment

Justin Rice Whiting (February 18, 1847 – January 31, 1903) was a politician and businessman from the U.S. state of Michigan.

Whiting was born in Bath, New York, and moved to Michigan in 1849 with his parents, who settled in St. Clair, Michigan. He attended the public schools and the University of Michigan at Ann Arbor from 1863 to 1865. He worked as a merchant, manufacturer and ran several businesses, among them, a power company. Whiting was elected mayor of St. Clair in 1879 and represented the 17th District in the Michigan State Senate in 1882.

He was elected as a Democrat from Michigan's 7th congressional district to the 50th United States Congress and reelected to the 51st, 52nd, and 53rd Congresses, serving from March 4, 1887 until March 3, 1895. After leaving Congress, Whiting resumed his former business pursuits in St. Clair. He was an unsuccessful Fusion candidate for Governor of Michigan in 1898, losing to incumbent Republican Hazen S. Pingree. He also ran for election in 1900 to the 57th Congress, losing to incumbent Republican Edgar Weeks.

Whiting married Emily F. Owen, with whom he had 10 children. Their son, also named Justin Rice Whiting (1886–1965), was president of the Consumers Power Company from 1949 to 1959.

Whiting was elected chairman of the Democratic State central committee in March 1901, succeeding Daniel J. Campau who resigned due to poor health. Whiting served as chairman until his death. He died in St. Clair and is interred there at Hillside Cemetery.

== See also ==
- 1898 Michigan gubernatorial election

Party political offices
Preceded by Charles R. Sligh	Democratic nominee for Governor of Michigan; 1898	Succeeded by William C. Maybury
Preceded by Charles R. Sligh	Silver nominee for Governor of Michigan; 1898	Succeeded by None
U.S. House of Representatives
Preceded by Ezra C. Carleton	United States Representative for the 7th congressional district of Michigan; 1887–1895	Succeeded by Horace G. Snover
