= Senator Strickland =

Senator Strickland may refer to:

- Brian Strickland (born 1983), Georgia State Senate
- Randolph Strickland (1823–1880), Michigan State Senate
- Ted L. Strickland (1932–2012), Colorado State Senate
- Tony Strickland (born 1970), California State Senate
