= Ezra C. Carleton =

American politician (1838–1911)

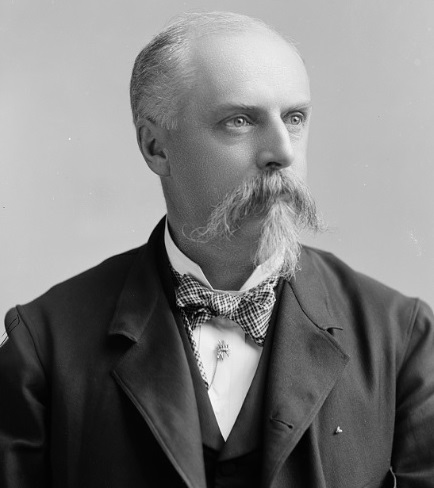
- C.M. Bell Studio Collection (Library of Congress), Circa 1882

Member of the U.S. House of Representatives from Michigan's 7th district
- In office March 4, 1883 – March 3, 1887
- Preceded by: John T. Rich
- Succeeded by: Justin Rice Whiting

Personal details
- Born: September 6, 1838 St. Clair, Michigan, U.S.
- Died: July 24, 1911 (aged 72) Port Huron, Michigan, U.S.
- Party: Democratic

Ezra Child Carleton (September 6, 1838 – July 24, 1911) was a U.S. representative from the 7th district of Michigan.

Carleton was born in St. Clair, Michigan, where he attended the common schools and graduated from the Port Huron High School in 1859. He engaged in business as a hardware merchant in Port Huron, running the business "Wim Stewart & Co" with two business partners. In 1881, he received the Democratic nomination for mayor of Port Huron, a position he occupied from 1881 to 1882.

In 1882, Carleton was nominated to run against John T. Rich to represent Michigan's 7th congressional district in the U.S. House. The Detroit Free Press reported that Carleton was popular in several important wards and could pose that he could pose a threat to Rich, a prediction proven correct when he won the election that November. He served in the House from March 4, 1883, until March 3, 1887, in the U.S. House representing Michigan's 7th congressional district. He was succeeded in office by Democrat Justin Rice Whiting.

After leaving Congress in 1887, Carleton returned to his former mercantile pursuits in Port Huron. He was the Democratic candidate for the 7th District in the election of 1894, losing to Republican Horace G. Snover.

Carleton died in Port Huron and is interred there in Lakeside Cemetery.

U.S. House of Representatives
Preceded by John T. Rich	United States Representative for the 7th congressional district of Michigan; 1883–1887	Succeeded by Justin R. Whiting
