= Michigan's congressional delegations =

Michigan's congressional districts since January 3, 2023.

These are tables of congressional delegations from Michigan to the United States House of Representatives and the United States Senate.

The current dean of the Michigan congressional delegation is Senator Gary Peters (D), having served in Congress since 2009.

== U.S. House of Representatives ==
=== Current members ===
This is a list of United States representatives from Michigan, their terms in office, district boundaries, and the district political ratings according to the CPVI. The delegation has a total of 13 members, with 7 Republicans and 6 Democrats.

Current U.S. representatives from Michigan
District	Member (Residence)	Party	Incumbent since	CPVI (2025)	District map
1st	Jack Bergman (Watersmeet)	Republican	January 3, 2017	R+11	
2nd	John Moolenaar (Caledonia)	Republican	January 3, 2015	R+15	
3rd	Hillary Scholten (Grand Rapids)	Democratic	January 3, 2023	D+4	
4th	Bill Huizenga (Holland)	Republican	January 3, 2011	R+3	
5th	Tim Walberg (Tipton)	Republican	January 3, 2011	R+13	
6th	Debbie Dingell (Ann Arbor)	Democratic	January 3, 2015	D+12	
7th	Tom Barrett (Charlotte)	Republican	January 3, 2025	EVEN	
8th	Kristen McDonald Rivet (Bay City)	Democratic	January 3, 2025	R+1	
9th	Lisa McClain (Bruce Township)	Republican	January 3, 2021	R+16	
10th	John James (Shelby Charter Township)	Republican	January 3, 2023	R+3	
11th	Haley Stevens (Birmingham)	Democratic	January 3, 2019	D+9	
12th	Rashida Tlaib (Detroit)	Democratic	January 3, 2019	D+21	
13th	Shri Thanedar (Detroit)	Democratic	January 3, 2023	D+22	

=== Delegates from Michigan Territory ===
Congress	Delegate
16th (1819–1821)	William Woodbridge (DR)
16th (1819–1821)	Solomon Sibley (F)
17th (1821–1823)	Solomon Sibley (F)
18th (1823–1825)	Gabriel Richard (I)
19th (1825–1827)	Austin Eli Wing (NR)
20th (1827–1829)	Austin Eli Wing (NR)
21st (1829–1831)	John Biddle (J)
22nd (1831–1833)	Austin Eli Wing (NR)
23rd (1833–1835)	Lucius Lyon (J)
24th (1835–1837)	George Wallace Jones (J)

=== Members of the House from Michigan ===
==== 1837–1843 ====
Congress	At-large
24th (1837)	Isaac E. Crary (J)
25th (1837–1839)	Isaac E. Crary (D)
26th (1839–1841)	Isaac E. Crary (D)
27th (1841–1843)	Jacob M. Howard (W)

==== 1843–1853 ====
Congress	1st district	2nd district	3rd district
28th (1843–1845)	Robert McClelland (D)	Lucius Lyon (D)	James B. Hunt (D)
29th (1845–1847)	Robert McClelland (D)	John Smith Chipman (D)	James B. Hunt (D)
30th (1847–1849)	Robert McClelland (D)	Edward Bradley (D)	Kinsley S. Bingham (D)
30th (1847–1849)	Robert McClelland (D)	Charles E. Stuart (D)	Kinsley S. Bingham (D)
31st (1849–1851)	Alexander W. Buel (D)	William Sprague (FS) (Note: Elected on a Free Soil Party ticket, but seated with the Whigs in Congress.)	Kinsley S. Bingham (D)
32nd (1851–1853)	Ebenezer J. Penniman (W)	Charles E. Stuart (D)	James L. Conger (W)

==== 1853–1863 ====
Congress	1st district	2nd district	3rd district	4th district
33rd (1853–1855)	David Stuart (D)	David A. Noble (D)	Samuel Clark (D)	Hestor L. Stevens (D)
34th (1855–1857)	William A. Howard (R)	Henry Waldron (R)	David S. Walbridge (R)	George W. Peck (D)
35th (1857–1859)	William A. Howard (R)	Henry Waldron (R)	David S. Walbridge (R)	Dewitt C. Leach (R)
36th (1859–1861)	George B. Cooper (D)	Henry Waldron (R)	Francis W. Kellogg (R)	Dewitt C. Leach (R)
36th (1859–1861)	William A. Howard (R)	Henry Waldron (R)	Francis W. Kellogg (R)	Dewitt C. Leach (R)
37th (1861–1863)	Bradley F. Granger (R)	Fernando C. Beaman (R)	Francis W. Kellogg (R)	Rowland E. Trowbridge (R)

==== 1863–1873 ====
Congress	1st district	2nd district	3rd district	4th district	5th district	6th district
38th (1863–1865)	Fernando C. Beaman (R)	Charles; Upson (R)	John W. Longyear (R)	Francis W. Kellogg (R)	Augustus C. Baldwin (D)	John F. Driggs (R)
39th (1865–1867)	Fernando C. Beaman (R)	Charles; Upson (R)	John W. Longyear (R)	Thomas W. Ferry (R)	Rowland E. Trowbridge (R)	John F. Driggs (R)
40th (1867–1869)	Fernando C. Beaman (R)	Charles; Upson (R)	Austin Blair (R)	Thomas W. Ferry (R)	Rowland E. Trowbridge (R)	John F. Driggs (R)
41st (1869–1871)	Fernando C. Beaman (R)	William L. Stoughton (R)	Austin Blair (R)	Thomas W. Ferry (R)	Omar D. Conger (R)	Randolph Strickland (R)
41st (1869–1871)	Fernando C. Beaman (R)	William L. Stoughton (R)	Austin Blair (R)	vacant	Omar D. Conger (R)	Randolph Strickland (R)
42nd (1871–1873)	Henry; Waldron (R)	William L. Stoughton (R)	Austin Blair (R)	vacant	Omar D. Conger (R)	Jabez G. Sutherland (D)
42nd (1871–1873)	Henry; Waldron (R)	William L. Stoughton (R)	Austin Blair (R)	Wilder D. Foster (R)	Omar D. Conger (R)	Jabez G. Sutherland (D)

==== 1873–1883 ====
Congress	District								
Congress	1st	2nd	3rd	4th	5th	6th	7th	8th	9th
43rd (1873–1875)	Moses W. Field (R)	Henry; Waldron (R)	George; Willard (R)	Julius C. Burrows (R)	Wilder D. Foster (R)	Josiah; Begole (R)	Omar D. Conger (R)	Nathan B. Bradley (R)	Jay; Hubbell (R)
43rd (1873–1875)	Moses W. Field (R)	Henry; Waldron (R)	George; Willard (R)	Julius C. Burrows (R)	William B. Williams (R)	Josiah; Begole (R)	Omar D. Conger (R)	Nathan B. Bradley (R)	Jay; Hubbell (R)
44th (1875–1877)	Alpheus S. Williams (D)	Henry; Waldron (R)	George; Willard (R)	Allen; Potter (D)	William B. Williams (R)	George H. Durand (D)	Omar D. Conger (R)	Nathan B. Bradley (R)	Jay; Hubbell (R)
45th (1877–1879)	Alpheus S. Williams (D)	Edwin; Willits (R)	Jonas H. McGowan (R)	Edwin W. Keightley (R)	John W. Stone (R)	Mark S. Brewer (R)	Omar D. Conger (R)	Charles C. Ellsworth (R)	Jay; Hubbell (R)
45th (1877–1879)	vacant	Edwin; Willits (R)	Jonas H. McGowan (R)	Edwin W. Keightley (R)	John W. Stone (R)	Mark S. Brewer (R)	Omar D. Conger (R)	Charles C. Ellsworth (R)	Jay; Hubbell (R)
46th (1879–1881)	John Stoughton; Newberry (R)	Edwin; Willits (R)	Jonas H. McGowan (R)	Julius C. Burrows (R)	John W. Stone (R)	Mark S. Brewer (R)	Omar D. Conger (R)	Roswell G. Horr (R)	Jay; Hubbell (R)
46th (1879–1881)	John Stoughton; Newberry (R)	Edwin; Willits (R)	Jonas H. McGowan (R)	Julius C. Burrows (R)	John W. Stone (R)	Mark S. Brewer (R)	vacant	Roswell G. Horr (R)	Jay; Hubbell (R)
47th (1881–1883)	Henry W. Lord (R)	Edwin; Willits (R)	Edward S. Lacey (R)	Julius C. Burrows (R)	George W. Webber (R)	Oliver L. Spaulding (R)	vacant	Roswell G. Horr (R)	Jay; Hubbell (R)
47th (1881–1883)	Henry W. Lord (R)	Edwin; Willits (R)	Edward S. Lacey (R)	Julius C. Burrows (R)	George W. Webber (R)	Oliver L. Spaulding (R)	John T. Rich (R)	Roswell G. Horr (R)	Jay; Hubbell (R)

==== 1883–1893 ====
Congress	District										
Congress	1st	2nd	3rd	4th	5th	6th	7th	8th	9th	10th	11th
48th (1883–1885)	William C. Maybury (D) (Note: Elected as Fusion candidate, but seated with the Democrats in Congress.)	Nathaniel B. Eldredge (D)	Edward S. Lacey (R)	George L. Yaple (D)	Julius; Houseman (D)	Edwin B. Winans (D)	Ezra C. Carleton (D)	Roswell G. Horr (R)	Byron M. Cutcheon (R)	Herschel H. Hatch (R)	Edward; Breitung (R)
49th (1885–1887)	William C. Maybury (D)	Nathaniel B. Eldredge (D)	James; O'Donnell (R)	Julius C. Burrows (R)	Charles C. Comstock (D)	Edwin B. Winans (D)	Ezra C. Carleton (D)	Timothy E. Tarsney (D)	Byron M. Cutcheon (R)	Spencer O. Fisher (D)	Seth C. Moffatt (R)
50th (1887–1889)	J. Logan; Chipman (D)	Edward P. Allen (R)	James; O'Donnell (R)	Julius C. Burrows (R)	Melbourne H. Ford (D)	Mark S. Brewer (R)	Justin R. Whiting (D)	Timothy E. Tarsney (D)	Byron M. Cutcheon (R)	Spencer O. Fisher (D)	Seth C. Moffatt (R)
50th (1887–1889)	J. Logan; Chipman (D)	Edward P. Allen (R)	James; O'Donnell (R)	Julius C. Burrows (R)	Melbourne H. Ford (D)	Mark S. Brewer (R)	Justin R. Whiting (D)	Timothy E. Tarsney (D)	Byron M. Cutcheon (R)	Spencer O. Fisher (D)	Henry W. Seymour (R)
51st (1889–1891)	J. Logan; Chipman (D)	Edward P. Allen (R)	James; O'Donnell (R)	Julius C. Burrows (R)	Charles E. Belknap (R)	Mark S. Brewer (R)	Justin R. Whiting (D)	Aaron T. Bliss (R)	Byron M. Cutcheon (R)	Frank W. Wheeler (R)	Samuel M. Stephenson (R)
52nd (1891–1893)	J. Logan; Chipman (D)	James S. Gorman (D)	James; O'Donnell (R)	Julius C. Burrows (R)	Melbourne H. Ford (D)	Byron G. Stout (D)	Justin R. Whiting (D)	Henry M. Youmans (D)	Harrison H. Wheeler (D)	Thomas A. E. Weadock (D)	Samuel M. Stephenson (R)
52nd (1891–1893)	J. Logan; Chipman (D)	James S. Gorman (D)	James; O'Donnell (R)	Julius C. Burrows (R)	Charles E. Belknap (R)	Byron G. Stout (D)	Justin R. Whiting (D)	Henry M. Youmans (D)	Harrison H. Wheeler (D)	Thomas A. E. Weadock (D)	Samuel M. Stephenson (R)

==== 1893–1915 ====
Congress	District												
Congress	1st	2nd	3rd	4th	5th	6th	7th	8th	9th	10th	11th	12th	At-large
53rd (1893–1895)	J. Logan; Chipman (D)	James S. Gorman (D)	Julius C. Burrows (R)	Henry F. Thomas (R)	George F. Richardson (D)	David D. Aitken (R)	Justin R. Whiting (D)	William S. Linton (R)	John W. Moon (R)	Thomas A. E. Weadock (D)	John; Avery (R)	Samuel M. Stephenson (R)	At-large
53rd (1893–1895)	Levi T. Griffin (D)	James S. Gorman (D)	vacant	Henry F. Thomas (R)	George F. Richardson (D)	David D. Aitken (R)	Justin R. Whiting (D)	William S. Linton (R)	John W. Moon (R)	Thomas A. E. Weadock (D)	John; Avery (R)	Samuel M. Stephenson (R)	At-large
54th (1895–1897)	John; Blaisdell; Corliss (R)	George; Spalding (R)	Alfred; Milnes (R)	Henry F. Thomas (R)	William; Alden; Smith (R)	David D. Aitken (R)	Horace G. Snover (R)	William S. Linton (R)	Roswell P. Bishop (R)	Rousseau; O. Crump (R)	John; Avery (R)	Samuel M. Stephenson (R)	At-large
55th (1897–1899)	John; Blaisdell; Corliss (R)	George; Spalding (R)	Albert M. Todd (D) (Note: Elected on the Democratic Peoples Union Silver ticket, a union of elements from the Democratic Party and Populist Party, but seated as Democrats.)	Edward L. Hamilton (R)	William; Alden; Smith (R)	Samuel; W. Smith (R)	Horace G. Snover (R)	Ferdinand; Brucker (D)	Roswell P. Bishop (R)	Rousseau; O. Crump (R)	William S. Mesick (R)	Carlos D. Shelden (R)	At-large
56th (1899–1901)	John; Blaisdell; Corliss (R)	Henry C. Smith (R)	Washington; Gardner (R)	Edward L. Hamilton (R)	William; Alden; Smith (R)	Samuel; W. Smith (R)	Edgar; Weeks (R)	Joseph W. Fordney (R)	Roswell P. Bishop (R)	Rousseau; O. Crump (R)	William S. Mesick (R)	Carlos D. Shelden (R)	At-large
57th (1901–1903)	John; Blaisdell; Corliss (R)	Henry C. Smith (R)	Washington; Gardner (R)	Edward L. Hamilton (R)	William; Alden; Smith (R)	Samuel; W. Smith (R)	Edgar; Weeks (R)	Joseph W. Fordney (R)	Roswell P. Bishop (R)	Rousseau; O. Crump (R)	Archibald B. Darragh (R)	Carlos D. Shelden (R)	At-large
57th (1901–1903)	John; Blaisdell; Corliss (R)	Henry C. Smith (R)	Washington; Gardner (R)	Edward L. Hamilton (R)	William; Alden; Smith (R)	Samuel; W. Smith (R)	Edgar; Weeks (R)	Joseph W. Fordney (R)	Roswell P. Bishop (R)	Henry Aplin (R)	Archibald B. Darragh (R)	Carlos D. Shelden (R)	At-large
58th (1903–1905)	Alfred; Lucking (D)	Charles E. Townsend (R)	Washington; Gardner (R)	Edward L. Hamilton (R)	William; Alden; Smith (R)	Samuel; W. Smith (R)	Henry; McMorran (R)	Joseph W. Fordney (R)	Roswell P. Bishop (R)	George A. Loud (R)	Archibald B. Darragh (R)	H. Olin; Young (R)	At-large
59th (1905–1907)	Edwin; Denby (R)	Charles E. Townsend (R)	Washington; Gardner (R)	Edward L. Hamilton (R)	William; Alden; Smith (R)	Samuel; W. Smith (R)	Henry; McMorran (R)	Joseph W. Fordney (R)	Roswell P. Bishop (R)	George A. Loud (R)	Archibald B. Darragh (R)	H. Olin; Young (R)	At-large
60th (1907–1909)	Edwin; Denby (R)	Charles E. Townsend (R)	Washington; Gardner (R)	Edward L. Hamilton (R)	William; Alden; Smith (R)	Samuel; W. Smith (R)	Henry; McMorran (R)	Joseph W. Fordney (R)	James C. McLaughlin (R)	George A. Loud (R)	Archibald B. Darragh (R)	H. Olin; Young (R)	At-large
60th (1907–1909)	Edwin; Denby (R)	Charles E. Townsend (R)	Washington; Gardner (R)	Edward L. Hamilton (R)	Gerrit J. Diekema (R)	Samuel; W. Smith (R)	Henry; McMorran (R)	Joseph W. Fordney (R)	James C. McLaughlin (R)	George A. Loud (R)	Archibald B. Darragh (R)	H. Olin; Young (R)	At-large
61st (1909–1911)	Edwin; Denby (R)	Charles E. Townsend (R)	Washington; Gardner (R)	Edward L. Hamilton (R)	Gerrit J. Diekema (R)	Samuel; W. Smith (R)	Henry; McMorran (R)	Joseph W. Fordney (R)	James C. McLaughlin (R)	George A. Loud (R)	Francis H. Dodds (R)	H. Olin; Young (R)	At-large
62nd (1911–1913)	Frank E. Doremus (D)	William; Wedemeyer (R)	John M. C. Smith (R)	Edward L. Hamilton (R)	Edwin F. Sweet (D)	Samuel; W. Smith (R)	Henry; McMorran (R)	Joseph W. Fordney (R)	James C. McLaughlin (R)	George A. Loud (R)	Francis H. Dodds (R)	H. Olin; Young (R)	At-large
63rd (1913–1915)	Frank E. Doremus (D)	Samuel; Beakes (D)	John M. C. Smith (R)	Edward L. Hamilton (R)	Carl E. Mapes (R)	Samuel; W. Smith (R)	Louis C. Cramton (R)	Joseph W. Fordney (R)	James C. McLaughlin (R)	Roy O. Woodruff (Prog)	Francis O. Lindquist (R)	H. Olin; Young (R)	Patrick H. Kelley (R)
63rd (1913–1915)	Frank E. Doremus (D)	Samuel; Beakes (D)	John M. C. Smith (R)	Edward L. Hamilton (R)	Carl E. Mapes (R)	Samuel; W. Smith (R)	Louis C. Cramton (R)	Joseph W. Fordney (R)	James C. McLaughlin (R)	Roy O. Woodruff (Prog)	Francis O. Lindquist (R)	William J. MacDonald (Prog)	Patrick H. Kelley (R)

==== 1915–1933 ====
Congress	District												
Congress	1st	2nd	3rd	4th	5th	6th	7th	8th	9th	10th	11th	12th	13th
64th (1915–1917)	Frank E. Doremus (D)	Samuel; Beakes (D)	John M. C. Smith (R)	Edward L. Hamilton (R)	Carl E. Mapes (R)	Patrick H. Kelley (R)	Louis C. Cramton (R)	Joseph W. Fordney (R)	James C. McLaughlin (R)	George A. Loud (R)	Frank D. Scott (R)	W. Frank; James (R)	Charles; Archibald; Nichols (R)
65th (1917–1919)	Frank E. Doremus (D)	Mark R. Bacon (R)	John M. C. Smith (R)	Edward L. Hamilton (R)	Carl E. Mapes (R)	Patrick H. Kelley (R)	Louis C. Cramton (R)	Joseph W. Fordney (R)	James C. McLaughlin (R)	Gilbert A. Currie (R)	Frank D. Scott (R)	W. Frank; James (R)	Charles; Archibald; Nichols (R)
65th (1917–1919)	Frank E. Doremus (D)	Samuel Beakes (D)	John M. C. Smith (R)	Edward L. Hamilton (R)	Carl E. Mapes (R)	Patrick H. Kelley (R)	Louis C. Cramton (R)	Joseph W. Fordney (R)	James C. McLaughlin (R)	Gilbert A. Currie (R)	Frank D. Scott (R)	W. Frank; James (R)	Charles; Archibald; Nichols (R)
66th (1919–1921)	Frank E. Doremus (D)	Earl C. Michener (R)	John M. C. Smith (R)	Edward L. Hamilton (R)	Carl E. Mapes (R)	Patrick H. Kelley (R)	Louis C. Cramton (R)	Joseph W. Fordney (R)	James C. McLaughlin (R)	Gilbert A. Currie (R)	Frank D. Scott (R)	W. Frank; James (R)	Charles; Archibald; Nichols (R)
66th (1919–1921)	Frank E. Doremus (D)	Earl C. Michener (R)	John M. C. Smith (R)	Edward L. Hamilton (R)	Carl E. Mapes (R)	Patrick H. Kelley (R)	Louis C. Cramton (R)	Joseph W. Fordney (R)	James C. McLaughlin (R)	Gilbert A. Currie (R)	Frank D. Scott (R)	W. Frank; James (R)	Clarence J. McLeod (R)
67th (1921–1923)	George P. Codd (R)	Earl C. Michener (R)	William H. Frankhauser (R)	John C. Ketcham (R)	Carl E. Mapes (R)	Patrick H. Kelley (R)	Louis C. Cramton (R)	Joseph W. Fordney (R)	James C. McLaughlin (R)	Roy O. Woodruff (R)	Frank D. Scott (R)	W. Frank; James (R)	Vincent M. Brennan (R)
67th (1921–1923)	George P. Codd (R)	Earl C. Michener (R)	John M. C. Smith (R)	John C. Ketcham (R)	Carl E. Mapes (R)	Patrick H. Kelley (R)	Louis C. Cramton (R)	Joseph W. Fordney (R)	James C. McLaughlin (R)	Roy O. Woodruff (R)	Frank D. Scott (R)	W. Frank; James (R)	Vincent M. Brennan (R)
68th (1923–1925)	Robert H. Clancy (D)	Earl C. Michener (R)	John M. C. Smith (R)	John C. Ketcham (R)	Carl E. Mapes (R)	Grant M. Hudson (R)	Louis C. Cramton (R)	Bird J. Vincent (R)	James C. McLaughlin (R)	Roy O. Woodruff (R)	Frank D. Scott (R)	W. Frank; James (R)	Clarence J. McLeod (R)
68th (1923–1925)	Robert H. Clancy (D)	Earl C. Michener (R)	Arthur B. Williams (R)	John C. Ketcham (R)	Carl E. Mapes (R)	Grant M. Hudson (R)	Louis C. Cramton (R)	Bird J. Vincent (R)	James C. McLaughlin (R)	Roy O. Woodruff (R)	Frank D. Scott (R)	W. Frank; James (R)	Clarence J. McLeod (R)
69th (1925–1927)	John B. Sosnowski (R)	Earl C. Michener (R)	Arthur B. Williams (R)	John C. Ketcham (R)	Carl E. Mapes (R)	Grant M. Hudson (R)	Louis C. Cramton (R)	Bird J. Vincent (R)	James C. McLaughlin (R)	Roy O. Woodruff (R)	Frank D. Scott (R)	W. Frank; James (R)	Clarence J. McLeod (R)
69th (1925–1927)	John B. Sosnowski (R)	Earl C. Michener (R)	Joseph L. Hooper (R)	John C. Ketcham (R)	Carl E. Mapes (R)	Grant M. Hudson (R)	Louis C. Cramton (R)	Bird J. Vincent (R)	James C. McLaughlin (R)	Roy O. Woodruff (R)	Frank D. Scott (R)	W. Frank; James (R)	Clarence J. McLeod (R)
70th (1927–1929)	Robert H. Clancy (R)	Earl C. Michener (R)	Joseph L. Hooper (R)	John C. Ketcham (R)	Carl E. Mapes (R)	Grant M. Hudson (R)	Louis C. Cramton (R)	Bird J. Vincent (R)	James C. McLaughlin (R)	Roy O. Woodruff (R)	Frank P. Bohn (R)	W. Frank; James (R)	Clarence J. McLeod (R)
71st (1929–1931)	Robert H. Clancy (R)	Earl C. Michener (R)	Joseph L. Hooper (R)	John C. Ketcham (R)	Carl E. Mapes (R)	Grant M. Hudson (R)	Louis C. Cramton (R)	Bird J. Vincent (R)	James C. McLaughlin (R)	Roy O. Woodruff (R)	Frank P. Bohn (R)	W. Frank; James (R)	Clarence J. McLeod (R)
72nd (1931–1933)	Robert H. Clancy (R)	Earl C. Michener (R)	Joseph L. Hooper (R)	John C. Ketcham (R)	Carl E. Mapes (R)	Seymour H. Person (R)	Jesse P. Wolcott (R)	Bird J. Vincent (R)	James C. McLaughlin (R)	Roy O. Woodruff (R)	Frank P. Bohn (R)	W. Frank; James (R)	Clarence J. McLeod (R)
72nd (1931–1933)	Robert H. Clancy (R)	Earl C. Michener (R)	Joseph L. Hooper (R)	John C. Ketcham (R)	Carl E. Mapes (R)	Seymour H. Person (R)	Jesse P. Wolcott (R)	Michael J. Hart (D)	vacant	Roy O. Woodruff (R)	Frank P. Bohn (R)	W. Frank; James (R)	Clarence J. McLeod (R)

==== 1933–1965 ====
Congress	District																		
Congress	1st	2nd	3rd	4th	5th	6th	7th	8th	9th	10th	11th	12th	13th	14th	15th	16th	17th	18th	At-large
73rd (1933–1935)	George G. Sadowski (D)	John C. Lehr (D)	Joseph L. Hooper (R)	George E. Foulkes (D)	Carl E. Mapes (R)	Claude E. Cady (D)	Jesse P. Wolcott (R)	Michael J. Hart (D)	Harry W. Musselwhite (D)	Roy O. Woodruff (R)	Prentiss M. Brown (D)	W. Frank; James (R)	Clarence J. McLeod (R)	Carl M. Wiedeman (D)	John; Dingell; Sr. (D)	John; Lesinski; Sr. (D)	George; Anthony; Dondero (R)	18th	At-large
74th (1935–1937)	George G. Sadowski (D)	Earl C. Michener (R)	Henry M. Kimball (R)	Clare; Hoffman (R)	Carl E. Mapes (R)	William W. Blackney (R)	Jesse P. Wolcott (R)	Fred L. Crawford (R)	Albert J. Engel (R)	Roy O. Woodruff (R)	Prentiss M. Brown (D)	Frank E. Hook (D)	Clarence J. McLeod (R)	Louis C. Rabaut (D)	John; Dingell; Sr. (D)	John; Lesinski; Sr. (D)	George; Anthony; Dondero (R)	18th	At-large
74th (1935–1937)	George G. Sadowski (D)	Earl C. Michener (R)	Verner; Main (R)	Clare; Hoffman (R)	Carl E. Mapes (R)	William W. Blackney (R)	Jesse P. Wolcott (R)	Fred L. Crawford (R)	Albert J. Engel (R)	Roy O. Woodruff (R)	vacant	Frank E. Hook (D)	Clarence J. McLeod (R)	Louis C. Rabaut (D)	John; Dingell; Sr. (D)	John; Lesinski; Sr. (D)	George; Anthony; Dondero (R)	18th	At-large
75th (1937–1939)	George G. Sadowski (D)	Earl C. Michener (R)	Paul W. Shafer (R)	Clare; Hoffman (R)	Carl E. Mapes (R)	Andrew J. Transue (D)	Jesse P. Wolcott (R)	Fred L. Crawford (R)	Albert J. Engel (R)	Roy O. Woodruff (R)	John F. Luecke (D)	Frank E. Hook (D)	George D. O'Brien (D)	Louis C. Rabaut (D)	John; Dingell; Sr. (D)	John; Lesinski; Sr. (D)	George; Anthony; Dondero (R)	18th	At-large
76th (1939–1941)	Rudolph G. Tenerowicz (D)	Earl C. Michener (R)	Paul W. Shafer (R)	Clare; Hoffman (R)	Carl E. Mapes (R)	William W. Blackney (R)	Jesse P. Wolcott (R)	Fred L. Crawford (R)	Albert J. Engel (R)	Roy O. Woodruff (R)	Fred; Bradley (R)	Frank E. Hook (D)	Clarence J. McLeod (R)	Louis C. Rabaut (D)	John; Dingell; Sr. (D)	John; Lesinski; Sr. (D)	George; Anthony; Dondero (R)	18th	At-large
76th (1939–1941)	Rudolph G. Tenerowicz (D)	Earl C. Michener (R)	Paul W. Shafer (R)	Clare; Hoffman (R)	Bartel J. Jonkman (R)	William W. Blackney (R)	Jesse P. Wolcott (R)	Fred L. Crawford (R)	Albert J. Engel (R)	Roy O. Woodruff (R)	Fred; Bradley (R)	Frank E. Hook (D)	Clarence J. McLeod (R)	Louis C. Rabaut (D)	John; Dingell; Sr. (D)	John; Lesinski; Sr. (D)	George; Anthony; Dondero (R)	18th	At-large
77th (1941–1943)	Rudolph G. Tenerowicz (D)	Earl C. Michener (R)	Paul W. Shafer (R)	Clare; Hoffman (R)	Bartel J. Jonkman (R)	William W. Blackney (R)	Jesse P. Wolcott (R)	Fred L. Crawford (R)	Albert J. Engel (R)	Roy O. Woodruff (R)	Fred; Bradley (R)	Frank E. Hook (D)	George D. O'Brien (D)	Louis C. Rabaut (D)	John; Dingell; Sr. (D)	John; Lesinski; Sr. (D)	George; Anthony; Dondero (R)	18th	At-large
78th (1943–1945)	George G. Sadowski (D)	Earl C. Michener (R)	Paul W. Shafer (R)	Clare; Hoffman (R)	Bartel J. Jonkman (R)	William W. Blackney (R)	Jesse P. Wolcott (R)	Fred L. Crawford (R)	Albert J. Engel (R)	Roy O. Woodruff (R)	Fred; Bradley (R)	John B. Bennett (R)	George D. O'Brien (D)	Louis C. Rabaut (D)	John; Dingell; Sr. (D)	John; Lesinski; Sr. (D)	George; Anthony; Dondero (R)	18th	At-large
79th (1945–1947)	George G. Sadowski (D)	Earl C. Michener (R)	Paul W. Shafer (R)	Clare; Hoffman (R)	Bartel J. Jonkman (R)	William W. Blackney (R)	Jesse P. Wolcott (R)	Fred L. Crawford (R)	Albert J. Engel (R)	Roy O. Woodruff (R)	Fred; Bradley (R)	Frank E. Hook (D)	George D. O'Brien (D)	Louis C. Rabaut (D)	John; Dingell; Sr. (D)	John; Lesinski; Sr. (D)	George; Anthony; Dondero (R)	18th	At-large
80th (1947–1949)	George G. Sadowski (D)	Earl C. Michener (R)	Paul W. Shafer (R)	Clare; Hoffman (R)	Bartel J. Jonkman (R)	William W. Blackney (R)	Jesse P. Wolcott (R)	Fred L. Crawford (R)	Albert J. Engel (R)	Roy O. Woodruff (R)	Fred; Bradley (R)	John B. Bennett (R)	Howard A. Coffin (R)	Harold F. Youngblood (R)	John; Dingell; Sr. (D)	John; Lesinski; Sr. (D)	George; Anthony; Dondero (R)	18th	At-large
80th (1947–1949)	George G. Sadowski (D)	Earl C. Michener (R)	Paul W. Shafer (R)	Clare; Hoffman (R)	Bartel J. Jonkman (R)	William W. Blackney (R)	Jesse P. Wolcott (R)	Fred L. Crawford (R)	Albert J. Engel (R)	Roy O. Woodruff (R)	Charles E. Potter (R)	John B. Bennett (R)	Howard A. Coffin (R)	Harold F. Youngblood (R)	John; Dingell; Sr. (D)	John; Lesinski; Sr. (D)	George; Anthony; Dondero (R)	18th	At-large
81st (1949–1951)	George G. Sadowski (D)	Earl C. Michener (R)	Paul W. Shafer (R)	Clare; Hoffman (R)	Gerald; Ford (R)	William W. Blackney (R)	Jesse P. Wolcott (R)	Fred L. Crawford (R)	Albert J. Engel (R)	Roy O. Woodruff (R)	Charles E. Potter (R)	John B. Bennett (R)	George D. O'Brien (D)	Louis C. Rabaut (D)	John; Dingell; Sr. (D)	John; Lesinski; Sr. (D)	George; Anthony; Dondero (R)	18th	At-large
81st (1949–1951)	George G. Sadowski (D)	Earl C. Michener (R)	Paul W. Shafer (R)	Clare; Hoffman (R)	Gerald; Ford (R)	William W. Blackney (R)	Jesse P. Wolcott (R)	Fred L. Crawford (R)	Albert J. Engel (R)	Roy O. Woodruff (R)	Charles E. Potter (R)	John B. Bennett (R)	George D. O'Brien (D)	Louis C. Rabaut (D)	John; Dingell; Sr. (D)	vacant	George; Anthony; Dondero (R)	18th	At-large
82nd (1951–1953)	Thaddeus; M. Machrowicz (D)	George; Meader (R)	Paul W. Shafer (R)	Clare; Hoffman (R)	Gerald; Ford (R)	William W. Blackney (R)	Jesse P. Wolcott (R)	Fred L. Crawford (R)	Ruth; Thompson (R)	Roy O. Woodruff (R)	Charles E. Potter (R)	John B. Bennett (R)	George D. O'Brien (D)	Louis C. Rabaut (D)	John; Dingell; Sr. (D)	John; Lesinski; Jr. (D)	George; Anthony; Dondero (R)	18th	At-large
82nd (1951–1953)	Thaddeus; M. Machrowicz (D)	George; Meader (R)	Paul W. Shafer (R)	Clare; Hoffman (R)	Gerald; Ford (R)	William W. Blackney (R)	Jesse P. Wolcott (R)	Fred L. Crawford (R)	Ruth; Thompson (R)	Roy O. Woodruff (R)	vacant	John B. Bennett (R)	George D. O'Brien (D)	Louis C. Rabaut (D)	John; Dingell; Sr. (D)	John; Lesinski; Jr. (D)	George; Anthony; Dondero (R)	18th	At-large
83rd (1953–1955)	Thaddeus; M. Machrowicz (D)	George; Meader (R)	Paul W. Shafer (R)	Clare; Hoffman (R)	Gerald; Ford (R)	Kit; Clardy (R)	Jesse P. Wolcott (R)	Alvin; Morell; Bentley (R)	Ruth; Thompson (R)	Al; Cederberg (R)	Victor A. Knox (R)	John B. Bennett (R)	George D. O'Brien (D)	Louis C. Rabaut (D)	John; Dingell; Sr. (D)	John; Lesinski; Jr. (D)	Charles G. Oakman (R)	George; Anthony; Dondero (R)	At-large
83rd (1953–1955)	Thaddeus; M. Machrowicz (D)	George; Meader (R)	vacant	Clare; Hoffman (R)	Gerald; Ford (R)	Kit; Clardy (R)	Jesse P. Wolcott (R)	Alvin; Morell; Bentley (R)	Ruth; Thompson (R)	Al; Cederberg (R)	Victor A. Knox (R)	John B. Bennett (R)	George D. O'Brien (D)	Louis C. Rabaut (D)	John; Dingell; Sr. (D)	John; Lesinski; Jr. (D)	Charles G. Oakman (R)	George; Anthony; Dondero (R)	At-large
84th (1955–1957)	Thaddeus; M. Machrowicz (D)	George; Meader (R)	August E. Johansen (R)	Clare; Hoffman (R)	Gerald; Ford (R)	Donald; Hayworth (D)	Jesse P. Wolcott (R)	Alvin; Morell; Bentley (R)	Ruth; Thompson (R)	Al; Cederberg (R)	Victor A. Knox (R)	John B. Bennett (R)	Charles; Diggs (D)	Louis C. Rabaut (D)	John; Dingell; Sr. (D)	John; Lesinski; Jr. (D)	Martha; Griffiths (D)	George; Anthony; Dondero (R)	At-large
84th (1955–1957)	Thaddeus; M. Machrowicz (D)	George; Meader (R)	August E. Johansen (R)	Clare; Hoffman (R)	Gerald; Ford (R)	Donald; Hayworth (D)	Jesse P. Wolcott (R)	Alvin; Morell; Bentley (R)	Ruth; Thompson (R)	Al; Cederberg (R)	Victor A. Knox (R)	John B. Bennett (R)	Charles; Diggs (D)	Louis C. Rabaut (D)	John; Dingell (D)	John; Lesinski; Jr. (D)	Martha; Griffiths (D)	George; Anthony; Dondero (R)	At-large
85th (1957–1959)	Thaddeus; M. Machrowicz (D)	George; Meader (R)	August E. Johansen (R)	Clare; Hoffman (R)	Gerald; Ford (R)	Charles E. Chamberlain (R)	Robert J. McIntosh (R)	Alvin; Morell; Bentley (R)	Robert P. Griffin (R)	Al; Cederberg (R)	Victor A. Knox (R)	John B. Bennett (R)	Charles; Diggs (D)	Louis C. Rabaut (D)	John; Dingell (D)	John; Lesinski; Jr. (D)	Martha; Griffiths (D)	William; Broomfield (R)	At-large
86th (1959–1961)	Thaddeus; M. Machrowicz (D)	George; Meader (R)	August E. Johansen (R)	Clare; Hoffman (R)	Gerald; Ford (R)	Charles E. Chamberlain (R)	James G. O'Hara (D)	Alvin; Morell; Bentley (R)	Robert P. Griffin (R)	Al; Cederberg (R)	Victor A. Knox (R)	John B. Bennett (R)	Charles; Diggs (D)	Louis C. Rabaut (D)	John; Dingell (D)	John; Lesinski; Jr. (D)	Martha; Griffiths (D)	William; Broomfield (R)	At-large
87th (1961–1963)	Thaddeus; M. Machrowicz (D)	George; Meader (R)	August E. Johansen (R)	Clare; Hoffman (R)	Gerald; Ford (R)	Charles E. Chamberlain (R)	James G. O'Hara (D)	R. James; Harvey (R)	Robert P. Griffin (R)	Al; Cederberg (R)	Victor A. Knox (R)	John B. Bennett (R)	Charles; Diggs (D)	Louis C. Rabaut (D)	John; Dingell (D)	John; Lesinski; Jr. (D)	Martha; Griffiths (D)	William; Broomfield (R)	At-large
87th (1961–1963)	Lucien; Nedzi (D)	George; Meader (R)	August E. Johansen (R)	Clare; Hoffman (R)	Gerald; Ford (R)	Charles E. Chamberlain (R)	James G. O'Hara (D)	R. James; Harvey (R)	Robert P. Griffin (R)	Al; Cederberg (R)	Victor A. Knox (R)	John B. Bennett (R)	Charles; Diggs (D)	Harold M. Ryan (D)	John; Dingell (D)	John; Lesinski; Jr. (D)	Martha; Griffiths (D)	William; Broomfield (R)	At-large
88th (1963–1965)	Lucien; Nedzi (D)	George; Meader (R)	August E. Johansen (R)	J. Edward; Hutchinson (R)	Gerald; Ford (R)	Charles E. Chamberlain (R)	James G. O'Hara (D)	R. James; Harvey (R)	Robert P. Griffin (R)	Al; Cederberg (R)	Victor A. Knox (R)	John B. Bennett (R)	Charles; Diggs (D)	Harold M. Ryan (D)	John; Dingell (D)	John; Lesinski; Jr. (D)	Martha; Griffiths (D)	William; Broomfield (R)	Neil; Staebler (D)

==== 1965–1993 ====
Congress	District																		
Congress	1st	2nd	3rd	4th	5th	6th	7th	8th	9th	10th	11th	12th	13th	14th	15th	16th	17th	18th	19th
89th (1965–1967)	John; Conyers (D)	Wes; Vivian (D)	Paul H. Todd Jr. (D)	J. Edward; Hutchinson (R)	Gerald; Ford (R)	Charles E. Chamberlain (R)	John C. Mackie (D)	R. James; Harvey (R)	Robert P. Griffin (R)	Al; Cederberg (R)	Raymond F. Clevenger (D)	James; G. O'Hara (D)	Charles; Diggs (D)	Lucien; Nedzi (D)	William; D. Ford (D)	John; Dingell (D)	Martha; Griffiths (D)	William; Broomfield (R)	Billie S. Farnum (D)
89th (1965–1967)	John; Conyers (D)	Wes; Vivian (D)	Paul H. Todd Jr. (D)	J. Edward; Hutchinson (R)	Gerald; Ford (R)	Charles E. Chamberlain (R)	John C. Mackie (D)	R. James; Harvey (R)	Guy; Vander; Jagt (R)	Al; Cederberg (R)	Raymond F. Clevenger (D)	James; G. O'Hara (D)	Charles; Diggs (D)	Lucien; Nedzi (D)	William; D. Ford (D)	John; Dingell (D)	Martha; Griffiths (D)	William; Broomfield (R)	Billie S. Farnum (D)
90th (1967–1969)	John; Conyers (D)	Marvin L. Esch (R)	Garry E. Brown (R)	J. Edward; Hutchinson (R)	Gerald; Ford (R)	Charles E. Chamberlain (R)	Donald; Riegle (R)	R. James; Harvey (R)	Guy; Vander; Jagt (R)	Al; Cederberg (R)	Philip; Ruppe (R)	James; G. O'Hara (D)	Charles; Diggs (D)	Lucien; Nedzi (D)	William; D. Ford (D)	John; Dingell (D)	Martha; Griffiths (D)	William; Broomfield (R)	Jack H. McDonald (R)
91st (1969–1971)	John; Conyers (D)	Marvin L. Esch (R)	Garry E. Brown (R)	J. Edward; Hutchinson (R)	Gerald; Ford (R)	Charles E. Chamberlain (R)	Donald; Riegle (R)	R. James; Harvey (R)	Guy; Vander; Jagt (R)	Al; Cederberg (R)	Philip; Ruppe (R)	James; G. O'Hara (D)	Charles; Diggs (D)	Lucien; Nedzi (D)	William; D. Ford (D)	John; Dingell (D)	Martha; Griffiths (D)	William; Broomfield (R)	Jack H. McDonald (R)
92nd (1971–1973)	John; Conyers (D)	Marvin L. Esch (R)	Garry E. Brown (R)	J. Edward; Hutchinson (R)	Gerald; Ford (R)	Charles E. Chamberlain (R)	Donald; Riegle (R)	R. James; Harvey (R)	Guy; Vander; Jagt (R)	Al; Cederberg (R)	Philip; Ruppe (R)	James; G. O'Hara (D)	Charles; Diggs (D)	Lucien; Nedzi (D)	William; D. Ford (D)	John; Dingell (D)	Martha; Griffiths (D)	William; Broomfield (R)	Jack H. McDonald (R)
93rd (1973–1975)	John; Conyers (D)	Marvin L. Esch (R)	Garry E. Brown (R)	J. Edward; Hutchinson (R)	Gerald; Ford (R)	Charles E. Chamberlain (R)	Donald; Riegle (R)	R. James; Harvey (R)	Guy; Vander; Jagt (R)	Al; Cederberg (R)	Philip; Ruppe (R)	James; G. O'Hara (D)	Charles; Diggs (D)	Lucien; Nedzi (D)	William; D. Ford (D)	John; Dingell (D)	Martha; Griffiths (D)	Robert J. Huber (R)	William; Broomfield (R)
93rd (1973–1975)	John; Conyers (D)	Marvin L. Esch (R)	Garry E. Brown (R)	J. Edward; Hutchinson (R)	Richard; Vander; Veen (D)	Charles E. Chamberlain (R)	Donald; Riegle (R)	J. Bob; Traxler (D)	Guy; Vander; Jagt (R)	Al; Cederberg (R)	Philip; Ruppe (R)	James; G. O'Hara (D)	Charles; Diggs (D)	Lucien; Nedzi (D)	William; D. Ford (D)	John; Dingell (D)	Martha; Griffiths (D)	Robert J. Huber (R)	William; Broomfield (R)
94th (1975–1977)	John; Conyers (D)	Marvin L. Esch (R)	Garry E. Brown (R)	J. Edward; Hutchinson (R)	Richard; Vander; Veen (D)	Bob; Carr (D)	Donald; Riegle (D)	J. Bob; Traxler (D)	Guy; Vander; Jagt (R)	Al; Cederberg (R)	Philip; Ruppe (R)	James; G. O'Hara (D)	Charles; Diggs (D)	Lucien; Nedzi (D)	William; D. Ford (D)	John; Dingell (D)	William; M. Brodhead (D)	James J. Blanchard (D)	William; Broomfield (R)
95th (1977–1979)	John; Conyers (D)	Carl; Pursell (R)	Garry E. Brown (R)	David; Stockman (R)	Harold S. Sawyer (R)	Bob; Carr (D)	Dale; Kildee (D)	J. Bob; Traxler (D)	Guy; Vander; Jagt (R)	Al; Cederberg (R)	Philip; Ruppe (R)	David; Bonior (D)	Charles; Diggs (D)	Lucien; Nedzi (D)	William; D. Ford (D)	John; Dingell (D)	William; M. Brodhead (D)	James J. Blanchard (D)	William; Broomfield (R)
96th (1979–1981)	John; Conyers (D)	Carl; Pursell (R)	Howard; Wolpe (D)	David; Stockman (R)	Harold S. Sawyer (R)	Bob; Carr (D)	Dale; Kildee (D)	J. Bob; Traxler (D)	Guy; Vander; Jagt (R)	Donald J. Albosta (D)	Bob; Davis (R)	David; Bonior (D)	Charles; Diggs (D)	Lucien; Nedzi (D)	William; D. Ford (D)	John; Dingell (D)	William; M. Brodhead (D)	James J. Blanchard (D)	William; Broomfield (R)
96th (1979–1981)	John; Conyers (D)	Carl; Pursell (R)	Howard; Wolpe (D)	David; Stockman (R)	Harold S. Sawyer (R)	Bob; Carr (D)	Dale; Kildee (D)	J. Bob; Traxler (D)	Guy; Vander; Jagt (R)	Donald J. Albosta (D)	Bob; Davis (R)	David; Bonior (D)	George; Crockett; Jr. (D)	Lucien; Nedzi (D)	William; D. Ford (D)	John; Dingell (D)	William; M. Brodhead (D)	James J. Blanchard (D)	William; Broomfield (R)
97th (1981–1983)	John; Conyers (D)	Carl; Pursell (R)	Howard; Wolpe (D)	David; Stockman (R)	Harold S. Sawyer (R)	James W. Dunn (R)	Dale; Kildee (D)	J. Bob; Traxler (D)	Guy; Vander; Jagt (R)	Donald J. Albosta (D)	Bob; Davis (R)	David; Bonior (D)	George; Crockett; Jr. (D)	Dennis; Hertel (D)	William; D. Ford (D)	John; Dingell (D)	William; M. Brodhead (D)	James J. Blanchard (D)	William; Broomfield (R)
97th (1981–1983)	John; Conyers (D)	Carl; Pursell (R)	Howard; Wolpe (D)	Mark D. Siljander (R)	Harold S. Sawyer (R)	James W. Dunn (R)	Dale; Kildee (D)	J. Bob; Traxler (D)	Guy; Vander; Jagt (R)	Donald J. Albosta (D)	Bob; Davis (R)	David; Bonior (D)	George; Crockett; Jr. (D)	Dennis; Hertel (D)	William; D. Ford (D)	John; Dingell (D)	William; M. Brodhead (D)	James J. Blanchard (D)	William; Broomfield (R)
98th (1983–1985)	John; Conyers (D)	Carl; Pursell (R)	Howard; Wolpe (D)	Mark D. Siljander (R)	Harold S. Sawyer (R)	Bob; Carr (D)	Dale; Kildee (D)	J. Bob; Traxler (D)	Guy; Vander; Jagt (R)	Donald J. Albosta (D)	Bob; Davis (R)	David; Bonior (D)	George; Crockett; Jr. (D)	Dennis; Hertel (D)	William; D. Ford (D)	John; Dingell (D)	Sander; Levin (D)	William; Broomfield (R)	Seat eliminated
99th (1985–1987)	John; Conyers (D)	Carl; Pursell (R)	Howard; Wolpe (D)	Mark D. Siljander (R)	Paul B. Henry (R)	Bob; Carr (D)	Dale; Kildee (D)	J. Bob; Traxler (D)	Guy; Vander; Jagt (R)	Bill; Schuette (R)	Bob; Davis (R)	David; Bonior (D)	George; Crockett; Jr. (D)	Dennis; Hertel (D)	William; D. Ford (D)	John; Dingell (D)	Sander; Levin (D)	William; Broomfield (R)	Seat eliminated
100th (1987–1989)	John; Conyers (D)	Carl; Pursell (R)	Howard; Wolpe (D)	Fred; Upton (R)	Paul B. Henry (R)	Bob; Carr (D)	Dale; Kildee (D)	J. Bob; Traxler (D)	Guy; Vander; Jagt (R)	Bill; Schuette (R)	Bob; Davis (R)	David; Bonior (D)	George; Crockett; Jr. (D)	Dennis; Hertel (D)	William; D. Ford (D)	John; Dingell (D)	Sander; Levin (D)	William; Broomfield (R)	Seat eliminated
101st (1989–1991)	John; Conyers (D)	Carl; Pursell (R)	Howard; Wolpe (D)	Fred; Upton (R)	Paul B. Henry (R)	Bob; Carr (D)	Dale; Kildee (D)	J. Bob; Traxler (D)	Guy; Vander; Jagt (R)	Bill; Schuette (R)	Bob; Davis (R)	David; Bonior (D)	George; Crockett; Jr. (D)	Dennis; Hertel (D)	William; D. Ford (D)	John; Dingell (D)	Sander; Levin (D)	William; Broomfield (R)	Seat eliminated
102nd (1991–1993)	John; Conyers (D)	Carl; Pursell (R)	Howard; Wolpe (D)	Fred; Upton (R)	Paul B. Henry (R)	Bob; Carr (D)	Dale; Kildee (D)	J. Bob; Traxler (D)	Guy; Vander; Jagt (R)	Dave; Camp (R)	Bob; Davis (R)	David; Bonior (D)	Barbara-Rose; Collins (D)	Dennis; Hertel (D)	William; D. Ford (D)	John; Dingell (D)	Sander; Levin (D)	William; Broomfield (R)	Seat eliminated

==== 1993–2013 ====
Congress	District															
Congress	1st	2nd	3rd	4th	5th	6th	7th	8th	9th	10th	11th	12th	13th	14th	15th	16th
103rd (1993–1995)	Bart; Stupak (D)	Pete; Hoekstra (R)	Paul Henry (R)	Dave; Camp (R)	James; Barcia (D)	Fred; Upton (R)	Nick; Smith (R)	Bob Carr (D)	Dale; Kildee (D)	David; Bonior (D)	Joe; Knollenberg (R)	Sander; Levin (D)	William D. Ford (D)	John; Conyers (D)	Barbara- Rose; Collins (D)	John; Dingell (D)
103rd (1993–1995)	Bart; Stupak (D)	Pete; Hoekstra (R)	Vern; Ehlers (R)	Dave; Camp (R)	James; Barcia (D)	Fred; Upton (R)	Nick; Smith (R)	Bob Carr (D)	Dale; Kildee (D)	David; Bonior (D)	Joe; Knollenberg (R)	Sander; Levin (D)	William D. Ford (D)	John; Conyers (D)	Barbara- Rose; Collins (D)	John; Dingell (D)
104th (1995–1997)	Bart; Stupak (D)	Pete; Hoekstra (R)	Vern; Ehlers (R)	Dave; Camp (R)	James; Barcia (D)	Fred; Upton (R)	Nick; Smith (R)	Dick Chrysler (R)	Dale; Kildee (D)	David; Bonior (D)	Joe; Knollenberg (R)	Sander; Levin (D)	Lynn; Rivers (D)	John; Conyers (D)	Barbara- Rose; Collins (D)	John; Dingell (D)
105th (1997–1999)	Bart; Stupak (D)	Pete; Hoekstra (R)	Vern; Ehlers (R)	Dave; Camp (R)	James; Barcia (D)	Fred; Upton (R)	Nick; Smith (R)	Debbie; Stabenow (D)	Dale; Kildee (D)	David; Bonior (D)	Joe; Knollenberg (R)	Sander; Levin (D)	Lynn; Rivers (D)	John; Conyers (D)	Carolyn; Cheeks; Kilpatrick (D)	John; Dingell (D)
106th (1999–2001)	Bart; Stupak (D)	Pete; Hoekstra (R)	Vern; Ehlers (R)	Dave; Camp (R)	James; Barcia (D)	Fred; Upton (R)	Nick; Smith (R)	Debbie; Stabenow (D)	Dale; Kildee (D)	David; Bonior (D)	Joe; Knollenberg (R)	Sander; Levin (D)	Lynn; Rivers (D)	John; Conyers (D)	Carolyn; Cheeks; Kilpatrick (D)	John; Dingell (D)
107th (2001–2003)	Bart; Stupak (D)	Pete; Hoekstra (R)	Vern; Ehlers (R)	Dave; Camp (R)	James; Barcia (D)	Fred; Upton (R)	Nick; Smith (R)	Mike; Rogers (R)	Dale; Kildee (D)	David; Bonior (D)	Joe; Knollenberg (R)	Sander; Levin (D)	Lynn; Rivers (D)	John; Conyers (D)	Carolyn; Cheeks; Kilpatrick (D)	John; Dingell (D)
108th (2003–2005)	Bart; Stupak (D)	Pete; Hoekstra (R)	Vern; Ehlers (R)	Dave; Camp (R)	Dale; Kildee (D)	Fred; Upton (R)	Nick; Smith (R)	Mike; Rogers (R)	Joe; Knollenberg (R)	Candice; Miller (R)	Thaddeus; McCotter (R)	Sander; Levin (D)	Carolyn; Cheeks; Kilpatrick (D)	John; Conyers (D)	John; Dingell (D)	Seat eliminated
109th (2005–2007)	Bart; Stupak (D)	Pete; Hoekstra (R)	Vern; Ehlers (R)	Dave; Camp (R)	Dale; Kildee (D)	Fred; Upton (R)	Joe Schwarz (R)	Mike; Rogers (R)	Joe; Knollenberg (R)	Candice; Miller (R)	Thaddeus; McCotter (R)	Sander; Levin (D)	Carolyn; Cheeks; Kilpatrick (D)	John; Conyers (D)	John; Dingell (D)	Seat eliminated
110th (2007–2009)	Bart; Stupak (D)	Pete; Hoekstra (R)	Vern; Ehlers (R)	Dave; Camp (R)	Dale; Kildee (D)	Fred; Upton (R)	Tim Walberg (R)	Mike; Rogers (R)	Joe; Knollenberg (R)	Candice; Miller (R)	Thaddeus; McCotter (R)	Sander; Levin (D)	Carolyn; Cheeks; Kilpatrick (D)	John; Conyers (D)	John; Dingell (D)	Seat eliminated
111th (2009–2011)	Bart; Stupak (D)	Pete; Hoekstra (R)	Vern; Ehlers (R)	Dave; Camp (R)	Dale; Kildee (D)	Fred; Upton (R)	Mark Schauer (D)	Mike; Rogers (R)	Gary; Peters (D)	Candice; Miller (R)	Thaddeus; McCotter (R)	Sander; Levin (D)	Carolyn; Cheeks; Kilpatrick (D)	John; Conyers (D)	John; Dingell (D)	Seat eliminated
112th (2011–2013)	Dan; Benishek (R)	Bill; Huizenga (R)	Justin; Amash (R)	Dave; Camp (R)	Dale; Kildee (D)	Fred; Upton (R)	Tim; Walberg (R)	Mike; Rogers (R)	Gary; Peters (D)	Candice; Miller (R)	Thaddeus; McCotter (R)	Sander; Levin (D)	Hansen; Clarke (D)	John; Conyers (D)	John; Dingell (D)	Seat eliminated
112th (2011–2013)	Dan; Benishek (R)	Bill; Huizenga (R)	Justin; Amash (R)	Dave; Camp (R)	Dale; Kildee (D)	Fred; Upton (R)	Tim; Walberg (R)	Mike; Rogers (R)	Gary; Peters (D)	Candice; Miller (R)	David Curson (D)	Sander; Levin (D)	Hansen; Clarke (D)	John; Conyers (D)	John; Dingell (D)	Seat eliminated

==== 2013–2023 ====
Congress	District													
Congress	1st	2nd	3rd	4th	5th	6th	7th	8th	9th	10th	11th	12th	13th	14th
113th (2013–2015)	Dan; Benishek (R)	Bill; Huizenga (R)	Justin; Amash (R)	Dave; Camp (R)	Dan; Kildee (D)	Fred; Upton (R)	Tim; Walberg (R)	Mike; Rogers (R)	Sander; Levin (D)	Candice; Miller (R)	Kerry; Bentivolio (R)	John; Dingell (D)	John; Conyers (D)	Gary; Peters (D)
114th (2015–2017)	Dan; Benishek (R)	Bill; Huizenga (R)	Justin; Amash (R)	John; Moolenaar (R)	Dan; Kildee (D)	Fred; Upton (R)	Tim; Walberg (R)	Mike; Bishop (R)	Sander; Levin (D)	Candice; Miller (R)	Dave; Trott (R)	Debbie; Dingell (D)	John; Conyers (D)	Brenda; Lawrence (D)
115th (2017–2019)	Jack; Bergman (R)	Bill; Huizenga (R)	Justin; Amash (R)	John; Moolenaar (R)	Dan; Kildee (D)	Fred; Upton (R)	Tim; Walberg (R)	Mike; Bishop (R)	Sander; Levin (D)	Paul; Mitchell (R)	Dave; Trott (R)	Debbie; Dingell (D)	John; Conyers (D)	Brenda; Lawrence (D)
115th (2017–2019)	Jack; Bergman (R)	Bill; Huizenga (R)	Justin; Amash (R)	John; Moolenaar (R)	Dan; Kildee (D)	Fred; Upton (R)	Tim; Walberg (R)	Mike; Bishop (R)	Sander; Levin (D)	Paul; Mitchell (R)	Dave; Trott (R)	Debbie; Dingell (D)	Brenda Jones (D)	Brenda; Lawrence (D)
116th (2019–2021)	Jack; Bergman (R)	Bill; Huizenga (R)	Justin; Amash (R)	John; Moolenaar (R)	Dan; Kildee (D)	Fred; Upton (R)	Tim; Walberg (R)	Elissa; Slotkin (D)	Andy; Levin (D)	Paul; Mitchell (R)	Haley; Stevens (D)	Debbie; Dingell (D)	Rashida; Tlaib (D)	Brenda; Lawrence (D)
116th (2019–2021)	Jack; Bergman (R)	Bill; Huizenga (R)	Justin Amash (I)	John; Moolenaar (R)	Dan; Kildee (D)	Fred; Upton (R)	Tim; Walberg (R)	Elissa; Slotkin (D)	Andy; Levin (D)	Paul; Mitchell (R)	Haley; Stevens (D)	Debbie; Dingell (D)	Rashida; Tlaib (D)	Brenda; Lawrence (D)
116th (2019–2021)	Jack; Bergman (R)	Bill; Huizenga (R)	Justin Amash (L)	John; Moolenaar (R)	Dan; Kildee (D)	Fred; Upton (R)	Tim; Walberg (R)	Elissa; Slotkin (D)	Andy; Levin (D)	Paul Mitchell (I)	Haley; Stevens (D)	Debbie; Dingell (D)	Rashida; Tlaib (D)	Brenda; Lawrence (D)
117th (2021–2023)	Jack; Bergman (R)	Bill; Huizenga (R)	Peter; Meijer (R)	John; Moolenaar (R)	Dan; Kildee (D)	Fred; Upton (R)	Tim; Walberg (R)	Elissa; Slotkin (D)	Andy; Levin (D)	Lisa; McClain (R)	Haley; Stevens (D)	Debbie; Dingell (D)	Rashida; Tlaib (D)	Brenda; Lawrence (D)

==== 2023–present ====
Congress	District												
Congress	1st	2nd	3rd	4th	5th	6th	7th	8th	9th	10th	11th	12th	13th
118th (2023–2025)	Jack; Bergman (R)	John; Moolenaar (R)	Hillary; Scholten (D)	Bill; Huizenga (R)	Tim; Walberg (R)	Debbie; Dingell (D)	Elissa; Slotkin (D)	Dan; Kildee (D)	Lisa; McClain (R)	John; James (R)	Haley; Stevens (D)	Rashida; Tlaib (D)	Shri; Thanedar (D)
119th (2025–2027)	Jack; Bergman (R)	John; Moolenaar (R)	Hillary; Scholten (D)	Bill; Huizenga (R)	Tim; Walberg (R)	Debbie; Dingell (D)	Tom; Barrett (R)	Kristen; McDonald; Rivet (D)	Lisa; McClain (R)	John; James (R)	Haley; Stevens (D)	Rashida; Tlaib (D)	Shri; Thanedar (D)
120th (2027–2029)	Jack; Bergman (R)	John; Moolenaar (R)	Hillary; Scholten (D)	Sean; McCann (D)	Tim; Walberg (R)	Debbie; Dingell (D)	William; Lawrence (D)	Kristen; McDonald; Rivet (D)	Lisa; McClain (R)	Christina; Hines (D)	Jerremy; Moss (D)	Rashida; Tlaib (D)	Donovan; McKinney (D)

== United States Senate ==
Current U.S. senators from Michigan
Michigan CPVI (2025): EVEN	Class I senator	Class II senator
Michigan CPVI (2025): EVEN	Elissa Slotkin (Junior senator) (Lansing)	Gary Peters (Senior senator) (Bloomfield Hills)
Party	Democratic	Democratic
Incumbent since	January 3, 2025	January 3, 2015

=== Senate delegation timeline (1835–present) ===
Tables showing membership in the Michigan federal Senate delegation throughout history of statehood in the United States.

Class I senators	Congress	Class II senators
Lucius Lyon (J)	24th (1835–1837)	John Norvell (J)
Lucius Lyon (D)	25th (1837–1839)	John Norvell (D)
vacant	26th (1839–1841)	John Norvell (D)
Augustus Seymour; Porter (W)	26th (1839–1841)	John Norvell (D)
Augustus Seymour; Porter (W)	27th (1841–1843)	William Woodbridge (W)
Augustus Seymour; Porter (W)	28th (1843–1845)	William Woodbridge (W)
Lewis Cass (D)	29th (1845–1847)	William Woodbridge (W)
Lewis Cass (D)	30th (1847–1849)	Alpheus Felch (D)
Thomas Fitzgerald (D)	30th (1847–1849)	Alpheus Felch (D)
Lewis Cass (D)	31st (1849–1851)	Alpheus Felch (D)
Lewis Cass (D)	32nd (1851–1853)	Alpheus Felch (D)
Lewis Cass (D)	33rd (1853–1855)	Charles E. Stuart (D)
Lewis Cass (D)	34th (1855–1857)	Charles E. Stuart (D)
Zachariah Chandler (R)	35th (1857–1859)	Charles E. Stuart (D)
Zachariah Chandler (R)	36th (1859–1861)	Kinsley S. Bingham (R)
Zachariah Chandler (R)	37th (1861–1863)	Kinsley S. Bingham (R)
Zachariah Chandler (R)	37th (1861–1863)	Jacob M. Howard (R)
Zachariah Chandler (R)	38th (1863–1865)	Jacob M. Howard (R)
Zachariah Chandler (R)	39th (1865–1867)	Jacob M. Howard (R)
Zachariah Chandler (R)	40th (1867–1869)	Jacob M. Howard (R)
Zachariah Chandler (R)	41st (1869–1871)	Jacob M. Howard (R)
Zachariah Chandler (R)	42nd (1871–1873)	Thomas W. Ferry (R)
Zachariah Chandler (R)	43rd (1873–1875)	Thomas W. Ferry (R)
Isaac P. Christiancy (R)	44th (1875–1877)	Thomas W. Ferry (R)
Isaac P. Christiancy (R)	45th (1877–1879)	Thomas W. Ferry (R)
Zachariah Chandler (R)	45th (1877–1879)	Thomas W. Ferry (R)
Zachariah Chandler (R)	46th (1879–1881)	Thomas W. Ferry (R)
Henry P. Baldwin (R)	46th (1879–1881)	Thomas W. Ferry (R)
Omar D. Conger (R)	47th (1881–1883)	Thomas W. Ferry (R)
Omar D. Conger (R)	48th (1883–1885)	Thomas W. Palmer (R)
Omar D. Conger (R)	49th (1885–1887)	Thomas W. Palmer (R)
Francis B. Stockbridge (R)	50th (1887–1889)	Thomas W. Palmer (R)
Francis B. Stockbridge (R)	51st (1889–1891)	James McMillan (R)
Francis B. Stockbridge (R)	52nd (1891–1893)	James McMillan (R)
Francis B. Stockbridge (R)	53rd (1893–1895)	James McMillan (R)
John Patton Jr. (R)	53rd (1893–1895)	James McMillan (R)
Julius C. Burrows (R)	53rd (1893–1895)	James McMillan (R)
Julius C. Burrows (R)	54th (1895–1897)	James McMillan (R)
Julius C. Burrows (R)	55th (1897–1899)	James McMillan (R)
Julius C. Burrows (R)	56th (1899–1901)	James McMillan (R)
Julius C. Burrows (R)	57th (1901–1903)	James McMillan (R)
Julius C. Burrows (R)	57th (1901–1903)	Russell A. Alger (R)
Julius C. Burrows (R)	58th (1903–1905)	Russell A. Alger (R)
Julius C. Burrows (R)	59th (1905–1907)	Russell A. Alger (R)
Julius C. Burrows (R)	59th (1905–1907)	William Alden Smith (R)
Julius C. Burrows (R)	60th (1907–1909)	William Alden Smith (R)
Julius C. Burrows (R)	61st (1909–1911)	William Alden Smith (R)
Charles E. Townsend (R)	62nd (1911–1913)	William Alden Smith (R)
Charles E. Townsend (R)	63rd (1913–1915)	William Alden Smith (R)
Charles E. Townsend (R)	64th (1915–1917)	William Alden Smith (R)
Charles E. Townsend (R)	65th (1917–1919)	William Alden Smith (R)
Charles E. Townsend (R)	66th (1919–1921)	Truman H. Newberry (R)
Charles E. Townsend (R)	67th (1921–1923)	Truman H. Newberry (R)
Charles E. Townsend (R)	67th (1921–1923)	James Couzens (R)
Woodbridge N. Ferris (D)	68th (1923–1925)	James Couzens (R)
Woodbridge N. Ferris (D)	69th (1925–1927)	James Couzens (R)
Woodbridge N. Ferris (D)	70th (1927–1929)	James Couzens (R)
Arthur Vandenberg (R)	70th (1927–1929)	James Couzens (R)
Arthur Vandenberg (R)	71st (1929–1931)	James Couzens (R)
Arthur Vandenberg (R)	72nd (1931–1933)	James Couzens (R)
Arthur Vandenberg (R)	73rd (1933–1935)	James Couzens (R)
Arthur Vandenberg (R)	74th (1935–1937)	James Couzens (R)
Arthur Vandenberg (R)	74th (1935–1937)	Prentiss M. Brown (D)
Arthur Vandenberg (R)	75th (1937–1939)	Prentiss M. Brown (D)
Arthur Vandenberg (R)	76th (1939–1941)	Prentiss M. Brown (D)
Arthur Vandenberg (R)	77th (1941–1943)	Prentiss M. Brown (D)
Arthur Vandenberg (R)	78th (1943–1945)	Homer Ferguson (R)
Arthur Vandenberg (R)	79th (1945–1947)	Homer Ferguson (R)
Arthur Vandenberg (R)	80th (1947–1949)	Homer Ferguson (R)
Arthur Vandenberg (R)	81st (1949–1951)	Homer Ferguson (R)
Arthur Vandenberg (R)	82nd (1951–1953)	Homer Ferguson (R)
Blair Moody (D)	82nd (1951–1953)	Homer Ferguson (R)
Charles E. Potter (R)	82nd (1951–1953)	Homer Ferguson (R)
Charles E. Potter (R)	83rd (1953–1955)	Homer Ferguson (R)
Charles E. Potter (R)	84th (1955–1957)	Patrick V. McNamara (D)
Charles E. Potter (R)	85th (1957–1959)	Patrick V. McNamara (D)
Philip Hart (D)	86th (1959–1961)	Patrick V. McNamara (D)
Philip Hart (D)	87th (1961–1963)	Patrick V. McNamara (D)
Philip Hart (D)	88th (1963–1965)	Patrick V. McNamara (D)
Philip Hart (D)	89th (1965–1967)	Patrick V. McNamara (D)
Philip Hart (D)	89th (1965–1967)	Robert P. Griffin (R)
Philip Hart (D)	90th (1967–1969)	Robert P. Griffin (R)
Philip Hart (D)	91st (1969–1971)	Robert P. Griffin (R)
Philip Hart (D)	92nd (1971–1973)	Robert P. Griffin (R)
Philip Hart (D)	93rd (1973–1975)	Robert P. Griffin (R)
Philip Hart (D)	94th (1975–1977)	Robert P. Griffin (R)
Donald Riegle (D)	94th (1975–1977)	Robert P. Griffin (R)
Donald Riegle (D)	95th (1977–1979)	Robert P. Griffin (R)
Donald Riegle (D)	96th (1979–1981)	Carl Levin (D)
Donald Riegle (D)	97th (1981–1983)	Carl Levin (D)
Donald Riegle (D)	98th (1983–1985)	Carl Levin (D)
Donald Riegle (D)	99th (1985–1987)	Carl Levin (D)
Donald Riegle (D)	100th (1987–1989)	Carl Levin (D)
Donald Riegle (D)	101st (1989–1991)	Carl Levin (D)
Donald Riegle (D)	102nd (1991–1993)	Carl Levin (D)
Donald Riegle (D)	103rd (1993–1995)	Carl Levin (D)
Spencer Abraham (R)	104th (1995–1997)	Carl Levin (D)
Spencer Abraham (R)	105th (1997–1999)	Carl Levin (D)
Spencer Abraham (R)	106th (1999–2001)	Carl Levin (D)
Debbie Stabenow (D)	107th (2001–2003)	Carl Levin (D)
Debbie Stabenow (D)	108th (2003–2005)	Carl Levin (D)
Debbie Stabenow (D)	109th (2005–2007)	Carl Levin (D)
Debbie Stabenow (D)	110th (2007–2009)	Carl Levin (D)
Debbie Stabenow (D)	111th (2009–2011)	Carl Levin (D)
Debbie Stabenow (D)	112th (2011–2013)	Carl Levin (D)
Debbie Stabenow (D)	113th (2013–2015)	Carl Levin (D)
Debbie Stabenow (D)	114th (2015–2017)	Gary Peters (D)
Debbie Stabenow (D)	115th (2017–2019)	Gary Peters (D)
Debbie Stabenow (D)	116th (2019–2021)	Gary Peters (D)
Debbie Stabenow (D)	117th (2021–2023)	Gary Peters (D)
Debbie Stabenow (D)	118th (2023–2025)	Gary Peters (D)
Elissa Slotkin (D)	119th (2025–2027)	Gary Peters (D)
Elissa Slotkin (D)	120th (2027–2029)	Abdul El-Sayed (D)

== Key ==
Democratic (D)
Democratic-Republican (DR)
Federalist (F)
Pro-Administration (PA)
Jacksonian (J)
Libertarian (L)
National Republican (NR)
Progressive (Bull Moose) (Prog)
Republican (R)
Whig (W)
Independent (I)

== See also ==
- List of United States congressional districts
- Michigan's congressional districts
- Political party strength in Michigan
