= Representative McIntosh =

Representative McIntosh may refer to:

- David McIntosh (politician) (born 1958), American politician from Indiana
- Robert J. McIntosh (1922–2008), American politician from Michigan
