= Melbourne H. Ford =

American politician (1849–1891)

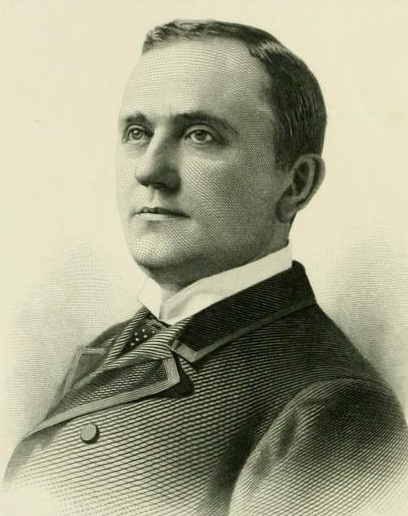

Member of the U.S. House of Representatives from Michigan's 5th district
- In office March 4, 1891 – April 20, 1891
- Preceded by: Charles E. Belknap
- Succeeded by: Charles E. Belknap
- In office March 4, 1887 – March 3, 1889
- Preceded by: Charles C. Comstock
- Succeeded by: Charles E. Belknap

Personal details
- Born: Melbourne Haddock Ford; 30 June 1849 Salem, Michigan, U.S.
- Died: April 20, 1891 (aged 41) Grand Rapids, Michigan, U.S.
- Party: Democratic
- Education: Michigan State College of Agriculture, United States Naval Academy
- Occupation: Politician & lawyer

Military service
- Branch/service: United States Navy

Melbourne Haddock Ford (June 30, 1849 – April 20, 1891) was an American politician from Michigan.

Ford was born in Salem, Michigan, and moved to Lansing with his parents in 1859. He attended the common schools and the Michigan State College of Agriculture (now Michigan State University) at East Lansing. Ford enlisted in the United States Navy in 1864, and in 1867 was appointed a midshipman at the United States Naval Academy in Annapolis, Maryland. He resigned the following year and returned to Lansing.

Ford moved to Grand Rapids in 1873 and was engaged as official stenographer of several municipal, State, and Federal courts. He studied law and was admitted to the bar in 1878. He was a member of the Michigan House of Representatives from the 1st district of Kent County in 1885 and 1886.

Ford was elected as a Democrat from Michigan's 5th congressional district to the 50th United States Congress, serving from March 4, 1887, to March 3, 1889. He was an unsuccessful candidate for reelection in 1888, being defeated by Charles E. Belknap, and commenced the practice of law at Grand Rapids in 1889. He was chairman of the Democratic State convention in 1890. In November 1890, he was elected to the 52nd Congress and served from March 4, 1891, until his death seven weeks later in Grand Rapids. He is interred there in Oak Hill Cemetery.

== See also ==
- List of members of the United States Congress who died in office (1790–1899)

U.S. House of Representatives
Preceded by Charles C. Comstock	United States Representative for the 5th congressional district of Michigan; March 4, 1887 – March 3, 1889	Succeeded by Charles E. Belknap
Preceded by Charles E. Belknap	United States Representative for the 5th congressional district of Michigan; March 4, 1891 – April 20, 1891	Succeeded by Charles E. Belknap
