= Henry McMorran =

American politician (1844–1929)

Henry Gordon McMorran
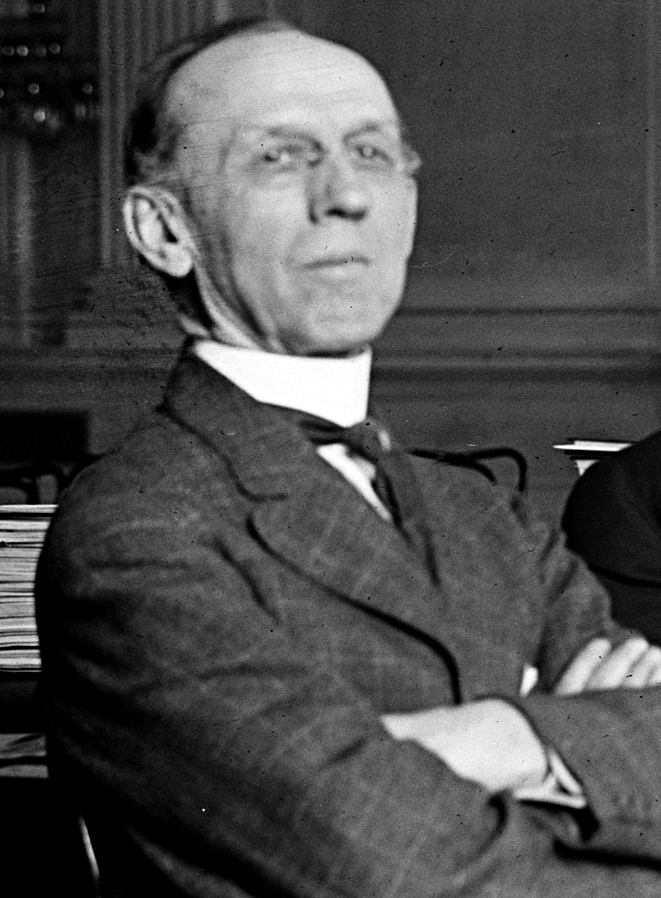

Member of the U.S. House of Representatives from Michigan's 7th district
- In office March 4, 1903 – March 3, 1913
- Preceded by: Edgar Weeks
- Succeeded by: Louis C. Cramton

Personal details
- Born: Henry Gordon McMorran; June 11, 1844 Port Huron, Michigan, United States
- Died: July 19, 1929 (aged 85) Port Huron, Michigan, United States
- Resting place: Lakeside Cemetery; Port Huron, Michigan, United States
- Party: Republican
- Spouse: Emma Caroline Williams (m. 1866)
- Children: Mary Isabell, David Williams, Emma Josephine, Clara Erma and Charles Frederick McMorran
- Occupation: Businessman, politician
- Committees: U.S. House Committee on Manufacturers
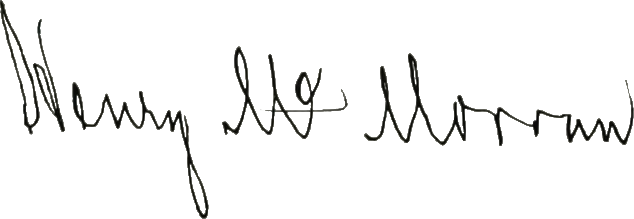
- Signature

Henry Gordon McMorran (June 11, 1844 – July 19, 1929) was an American Republican politician and businessman.

He served five terms in the U.S. Congress as a U.S. representative from Michigan's 7th congressional district from March 4, 1903, until March 3, 1913.

== Early life and education ==
McMorran was born in Port Huron, Michigan, where he attended the Crawford Private School.

He married Emma Caroline Williams in October 1866.

== Early career ==
He engaged in the wholesale grocery business in 1865 and also in the milling, grain, and elevator business.

He was a member of the Port Huron board of aldermen in 1867 and was the Port Huron city treasurer in 1875. McMorran was general manager of the Port Huron and Northwestern Railway from 1878 to 1889 and a member of the State canal commission.

== U.S. Representative ==
In 1902, McMorran was elected to the 58th U.S. Congress and was subsequently re-elected to the four succeeding Congresses. He was chair of the U.S. House Committee on Manufacturers in the 60th and 61st U.S. Congresses. He was not a candidate for renomination in 1912.

== Later life ==
After leaving the U.S. Congress, McMorran engaged in numerous business enterprises at Port Huron. He organized the Great Lakes Foundry Company, serving as its president.

== Death and legacy ==
McMorran died at his home in Port Huron on July 19, 1929, age 85, and is interred there in Lakeside Cemetery. Port Huron's main sports and concert arena, the McMorran Place is named after him and opened in 1960 in his honor.

U.S. House of Representatives
Preceded by Edgar Weeks	United States Representative for the 7th congressional district of Michigan; 1903–1913	Succeeded by Louis C. Cramton
