= 1898 Michigan gubernatorial election =

- November 8, 1898
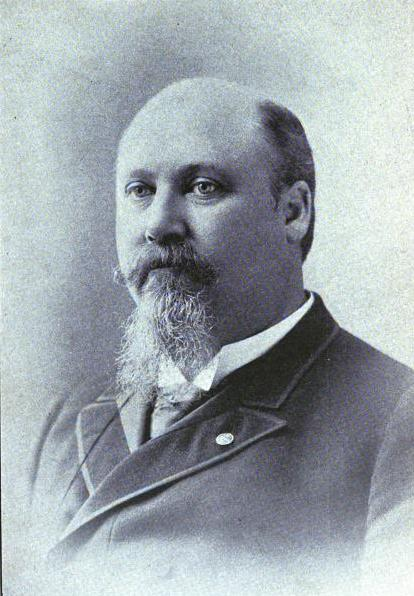

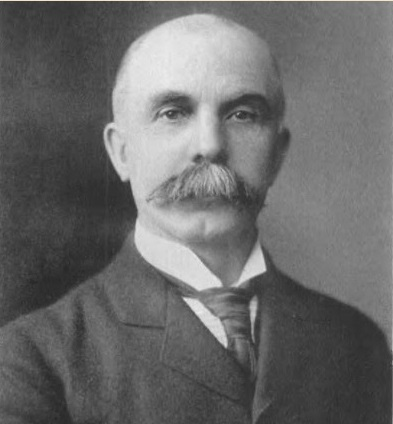
Nominee	Hazen S. Pingree	Justin R. Whiting
Party	Republican	Democratic
Alliance		Populist
Popular vote	243,239	168,142
Percentage	57.75%	39.92%
- County results Pingree: 40–50% 50–60% 60–70% 70–80% 80–90% 90–100% Whiting: 40–50% 50–60%
Governor before election
Hazen S. Pingree
Republican
Elected Governor
Hazen S. Pingree
Republican

The 1898 Michigan gubernatorial election was held on November 8, 1898. Incumbent Republican Hazen S. Pingree defeated Fusion candidate of the Democratic, People's, and Union Silver parties, Justin R. Whiting, with 57.75% of the vote.

== General election ==
=== Candidates ===
Major party candidates

- Hazen S. Pingree, Republican
- Justin R. Whiting, D.P.U.S (Note: Whiting ran under a fusion ticket between the Democrats, the Populists and the Union Silver Party.)

Other candidates

- Noah W. Cheever, Prohibition
- Sullivan W. Cook, People's
- George Hasseler, Socialist Labor

=== Results ===
1898 Michigan gubernatorial election
Party	Candidate	Votes	%	±%
Republican	Hazen S. Pingree (inc.)	243,239	57.75%	+2.18%
Democratic	Justin R. Whiting	168,142	39.92%	−1.19%
Prohibition	Noah W. Cheever	7,006%	1.66%	+0.65%
Populist	Sullivan W. Cook	1,656	0.39%	
Socialist Labor	George Hasseler	1,101	0.26%	
	Scattering	20	0.00%	
Majority		75,097	17.83%	
Total votes		421,164	100.00%	
Republican hold		Swing	+3.37%	

==== Results by county ====
Arenac County voted Republican for the first time ever in this election.

County	Hazen S. Pingree Republican		Justin R. Whiting Democratic		Noah W. Cheever Prohibition		Sullivan W. Cook Populist		George Hasseler Socialist Labor		Margin		Total votes cast
County	#	%	#	%	#	%	#	%	#	%	#	%	Total votes cast
Alcona	671	82.43%	129	15.85%	13	1.60%	0	0.00%	1	0.12%	542	66.58%	814
Alger	761	67.95%	352	31.43%	4	0.36%	3	0.27%	0	0.00%	409	36.52%	1,120
Allegan	3,493	53.16%	2,890	43.98%	140	2.13%	39	0.59%	8	0.12%	603	9.18%	6,571 (Note: Includes 1 Scattering vote)
Alpena	1,766	59.00%	1,188	39.69%	21	0.70%	9	0.30%	9	0.30%	578	19.31%	2,993
Antrim	1,328	74.56%	401	22.52%	37	2.08%	14	0.79%	1	0.06%	927	52.05%	1,781
Arenac	748	52.60%	637	44.80%	23	1.62%	12	0.84%	2	0.14%	111	7.81%	1,422
Baraga	609	67.00%	291	32.01%	7	0.77%	1	0.11%	1	0.11%	318	34.98%	909
Barry	2,887	52.64%	2,453	44.73%	91	1.66%	53	0.97%	0	0.00%	434	7.91%	5,484
Bay	5,617	58.33%	3,899	40.49%	76	0.79%	13	0.14%	24	0.25%	1,718	17.84%	9,629
Benzie	866	61.59%	459	32.65%	60	4.27%	17	1.21%	4	0.28%	407	28.95%	1,406
Berrien	6,096	58.11%	4,172	39.77%	179	1.71%	30	0.29%	14	0.13%	1,924	18.34%	10,491
Branch	3,411	50.65%	3,200	47.52%	87	1.29%	31	0.46%	5	0.07%	211	3.13%	6,734
Calhoun	5,407	52.80%	4,606	44.98%	172	1.68%	44	0.43%	12	0.12%	801	7.82%	10,241
Cass	2,913	53.92%	2,374	43.95%	89	1.65%	24	0.44%	2	0.04%	539	9.98%	5,402
Charlevoix	933	65.89%	429	30.30%	42	2.97%	9	0.64%	3	0.21%	504	35.89%	1,416
Cheboygan	1,384	55.92%	1,017	41.09%	53	2.14%	17	0.69%	4	0.16%	367	14.83%	2,475
Chippewa	1,731	63.29%	914	33.42%	77	2.82%	3	0.11%	10	0.37%	817	29.87%	2,735
Clare	818	57.32%	578	40.50%	25	1.75%	5	0.35%	1	0.07%	240	16.82%	1,427
Clinton	3,090	51.31%	2,821	46.84%	86	1.43%	18	0.30%	6	0.10%	269	4.47%	6,022
Crawford	366	57.10%	263	41.03%	8	1.25%	3	0.47%	1	0.16%	103	16.07%	641
Delta	1,299	72.57%	461	25.75%	14	0.78%	11	0.61%	5	0.28%	838	46.82%	1,790
Dickinson	2,001	85.08%	302	12.84%	33	1.40%	3	0.13%	13	0.55%	1,699	72.24%	2,352
Eaton	4,264	52.34%	3,726	45.73%	108	1.33%	39	0.48%	10	0.12%	538	6.60%	8,147
Emmet	1,515	57.56%	1,023	38.87%	82	3.12%	11	0.42%	1	0.04%	492	18.69%	2,632
Genesee	4,834	58.73%	3,156	38.34%	204	2.48%	30	0.36%	7	0.09%	1,678	20.39%	8,231
Gladwin	685	68.30%	306	30.51%	10	1.00%	1	0.10%	1	0.10%	379	37.79%	1,003
Gogebic	1,583	68.92%	632	27.51%	63	2.74%	10	0.44%	9	0.39%	951	41.40%	2,297
Grand Traverse	1,900	69.52%	728	26.64%	83	3.04%	18	0.66%	4	0.15%	1,172	42.88%	2,733
Gratiot	3,097	50.29%	2,883	46.82%	102	1.66%	68	1.10%	7	0.11%	214	3.48%	6,158
Hillsdale	3,825	51.58%	3,420	46.12%	119	1.60%	47	0.63%	5	0.07%	405	5.46%	7,416
Houghton	4,468	73.96%	1,271	21.04%	264	4.37%	30	0.50%	8	0.13%	3,197	52.92%	6,041
Huron	3,113	65.29%	1,490	31.25%	80	1.68%	84	1.76%	1	0.02%	1,623	34.04%	4,768
Ingham	4,523	47.86%	4,594	48.61%	244	2.58%	79	0.84%	9	0.10%	-71	-0.75%	9,450
Ionia	4,287	50.16%	4,138	48.41%	98	1.15%	21	0.25%	3	0.04%	149	1.74%	8,547
Iosco	1,096	65.39%	556	33.17%	16	0.95%	2	0.12%	6	0.36%	540	32.22%	1,676
Iron	795	72.60%	286	26.12%	10	0.91%	2	0.18%	2	0.18%	509	46.48%	1,095
Isabella	2,387	56.87%	1,732	41.27%	52	1.24%	20	0.48%	6	0.14%	655	15.61%	4,197
Jackson	4,643	44.61%	5,468	52.54%	248	2.38%	39	0.37%	8	0.08%	-825	-7.93%	10,407
Kalamazoo	5,112	56.61%	3,747	41.49%	132	1.46%	32	0.35%	7	0.08%	1,365	15.11%	9,031
Kalkaska	710	78.71%	166	18.40%	20	2.22%	4	0.44%	2	0.22%	544	60.31%	902
Kent	15,246	64.34%	7,924	33.44%	454	1.92%	58	0.24%	13	0.05%	7,322	30.90%	23,695
Keweenaw	324	91.78%	24	6.80%	2	0.57%	1	0.28%	2	0.57%	300	84.99%	353
Lake	709	62.97%	383	34.01%	20	1.78%	8	0.71%	6	0.53%	326	28.95%	1,126
Lapeer	2,937	59.32%	1,915	38.68%	82	1.66%	12	0.24%	5	0.10%	1,022	20.64%	4,951
Leelanau	827	70.20%	318	26.99%	24	2.04%	6	0.51%	3	0.25%	509	43.21%	1,178
Lenawee	5,529	48.65%	5,538	48.72%	237	2.09%	41	0.36%	19	0.17%	-9	-0.08%	11,366 (Note: Includes 2 Scattering votes)
Livingston	2,644	49.88%	2,513	47.41%	128	2.41%	13	0.25%	3	0.06%	131	2.47%	5,301
Luce	357	56.49%	258	40.82%	14	2.22%	3	0.47%	0	0.00%	99	15.66%	632
Mackinac	673	54.63%	542	43.99%	15	1.22%	0	0.00%	2	0.16%	131	10.63%	1,232
Macomb	3,727	54.03%	3,035	44.00%	108	1.57%	12	0.17%	6	0.09%	692	10.03%	6,898 (Note: Includes 10 Scattering votes)
Manistee	2,465	54.66%	1,972	43.73%	57	1.26%	9	0.20%	7	0.16%	493	10.93%	4,510
Marquette	3,214	66.71%	1,298	26.94%	224	4.65%	37	0.77%	45	0.93%	1,916	39.77%	4,818
Mason	1,741	63.15%	943	34.20%	64	2.32%	4	0.15%	5	0.18%	798	28.94%	2,757
Mecosta	2,050	68.84%	865	29.05%	50	1.68%	8	0.27%	5	0.17%	1,185	39.79%	2,978
Menominee	1,843	62.79%	1,045	35.60%	34	1.16%	5	0.17%	8	0.27%	798	27.19%	2,935
Midland	1,277	54.67%	1,000	42.81%	29	1.24%	27	1.16%	3	0.13%	277	11.86%	2,336
Missaukee	957	64.01%	500	33.44%	36	2.41%	1	0.07%	1	0.07%	457	30.57%	1,495
Monroe	3,238	48.85%	3,276	49.43%	94	1.42%	16	0.24%	4	0.06%	-38	-0.57%	6,628
Montcalm	3,243	58.78%	2,155	39.06%	67	1.21%	41	0.74%	11	0.20%	1,088	19.72%	5,517
Montmorency	510	69.20%	223	30.26%	4	0.54%	0	0.00%	0	0.00%	287	38.94%	737
Muskegon	4,271	69.51%	1,764	28.71%	72	1.17%	23	0.37%	14	0.23%	2,507	40.80%	6,144
Newaygo	2,094	64.21%	1,097	33.64%	57	1.75%	11	0.34%	2	0.06%	997	30.57%	3,261
Oakland	5,442	53.49%	4,415	43.39%	292	2.87%	25	0.25%	0	0.00%	1,027	10.09%	10,174
Oceana	2,178	66.81%	955	29.29%	110	3.37%	13	0.40%	4	0.12%	1,223	37.52%	3,260
Ogemaw	893	63.88%	478	34.19%	22	1.57%	3	0.21%	2	0.14%	415	29.69%	1,398
Ontonagon	572	64.20%	308	34.57%	5	0.56%	4	0.45%	2	0.22%	264	29.63%	891
Osceola	1,614	69.36%	617	26.51%	87	3.74%	4	0.17%	5	0.21%	997	42.84%	2,327
Oscoda	183	73.79%	62	25.00%	2	0.81%	1	0.40%	0	0.00%	121	48.79%	248
Otsego	898	68.24%	402	30.55%	12	0.91%	2	0.15%	2	0.15%	496	37.69%	1,316
Ottawa	3,906	60.41%	2,456	37.98%	74	1.14%	20	0.31%	10	0.15%	1,450	22.42%	6,466
Presque Isle	850	71.97%	328	27.77%	2	0.17%	0	0.00%	1	0.08%	522	44.20%	1,181
Roscommon	285	72.34%	101	25.63%	4	1.02%	4	1.02%	0	0.00%	184	46.70%	394
Saginaw	7,102	56.29%	5,306	42.06%	93	0.74%	30	0.24%	85	0.67%	1,796	14.24%	12,616
Sanilac	3,021	61.08%	1,800	36.39%	89	1.80%	34	0.69%	2	0.04%	1,221	24.69%	4,946
Schoolcraft	818	65.76%	412	33.12%	11	0.88%	2	0.16%	1	0.08%	406	32.64%	1,244
Shiawassee	4,128	56.00%	3,035	41.17%	182	2.47%	19	0.26%	7	0.09%	1,093	14.83%	7,371
St. Clair	6,109	61.18%	3,750	37.55%	101	1.01%	13	0.13%	13	0.13%	2,359	23.62%	9,986
St. Joseph	2,443	49.19%	2,352	47.36%	100	2.01%	66	1.33%	5	0.10%	91	1.83%	4,966
Tuscola	4,130	64.47%	2,058	32.13%	171	2.67%	42	0.66%	5	0.08%	2,072	32.34%	6,406
Van Buren	3,944	55.81%	2,938	41.57%	99	1.40%	84	1.19%	2	0.03%	1,006	14.24%	7,067
Washtenaw	4,704	49.68%	4,572	48.28%	177	1.87%	14	0.15%	1	0.01%	132	1.39%	9,469
Wayne	27,689	58.00%	19,273	40.37%	175	0.37%	38	0.08%	564	1.18%	8,416	17.63%	47,740
Wexford	1,422	62.81%	778	34.36%	54	2.39%	6	0.27%	4	0.18%	644	28.45%	2,264
Total	243,239	57.75%	168,142	39.92%	7,006	1.66%	1,656	0.39%	1,101	0.26%	75,097	17.83%	421,164

===== Counties that flipped from Democratic to Republican =====
- Arenac
- Branch
- Eaton
- Gratiot
- Ionia
- Isabella
- St. Joseph

===== Counties that flipped from Republican to Democratic =====
- Lenawee
- Monroe
