= George F. Richardson =

American politician

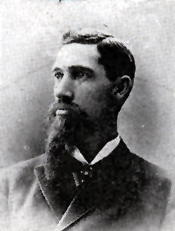
- From 1893's The House of Representatives of the Fifty Third Congress, published by The Graphic Chicago newspaper

Member of the U.S. House of Representatives from Michigan's 5th district
- In office March 4, 1893 – March 3, 1895
- Preceded by: Charles E. Belknap
- Succeeded by: William Alden Smith

Member of the Michigan House of Representatives from the Ottawa 2 district
- In office 1885–1887

Personal details
- Born: July 1, 1850 Jamestown Township, Michigan, U.S.
- Died: March 1, 1923 (aged 72) Bellevue, Washington, U.S.
- Party: Democratic

George Frederick Richardson (July 1, 1850 – March 1, 1923) was a politician from the U.S. states of Michigan and Washington.

== Early life and education ==
Richardson was born in Jamestown Township, Michigan, and attended the common schools. He engaged in agricultural and mercantile pursuits and was elected township clerk eight years in succession. He was a member of the Michigan House of Representatives from Ottawa County 2nd district, from 1885 to 1887 and 1891 to 1892, and served as speaker of the house in the two years. He moved to Grand Rapids, Michigan, in 1893.

== Controversy in election to the House of Representatives ==
In 1892, as the candidate for the Democratic Party, Richardson won a close election for U.S. Representative from Michigan's 5th congressional district. Richardson won the November 8, 1892, general election by a plurality of 10 votes and received a certificate of election from the board of state canvassers. The defeated candidate, incumbent Republican Charles E. Belknap, requested a recount in Ionia County, alleging irregularities. The Michigan Supreme Court ordered a recount on February 3, 1893, which subsequently resulted in a plurality of 19 votes for Belknap. The new board of state canvassers then issued a certificate of election to Belknap. The contest was brought to the floor of the U.S. House of Representatives on August 8, 1893. Following debate on the validity of the contestants’ credentials, the House voted to seat Richardson, referring the matter to the House Committee on Elections. Following further examination, the committee issued a report upholding Richardson’s claim to the seat. Richardson served in the 53rd Congress from March 4, 1893, to March 3, 1895. He declined to be a candidate for re-nomination in 1894.

== Career after politics ==
Richardson then began operating a dairy farm in Grand Rapids. He was an unsuccessful Democratic candidate for the Michigan Senate 16th District in 1896, and was secretary of Michigan Union Silver Party in 1899. He moved to Kennewick, Washington, in 1904 and engaged in agricultural pursuits and in the transfer, livery, and fuel business his company named Kennewick Transfer Company was located at 112 W Kennewick Ave. He was twice elected mayor of Kennewick and also served as chairman of the school board. He moved to Ellensburg, Washington, and in 1916 engaged in agricultural pursuits.

== Retirement and death ==
George F. Richardson retired to private life in 1919 and made his home in Bellevue, Washington, where he died. He is interred in the Odd Fellows Cemetery, Ellensburg.

U.S. House of Representatives
Preceded by Charles E. Belknap	United States Representative for the 5th congressional district of Michigan; 1893 – 1895	Succeeded by William Alden Smith
