= Louis C. Cramton =

American politician (1875–1966)

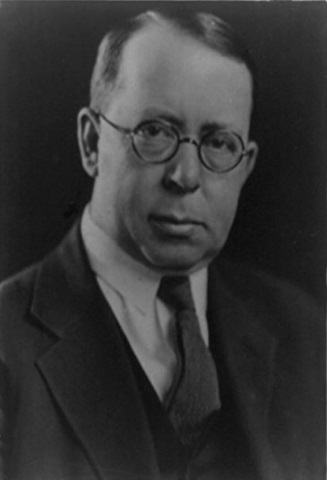

Member of the U.S. House of Representatives from Michigan's 7th district
- In office March 4, 1913 – March 3, 1931
- Preceded by: Henry McMorran
- Succeeded by: Jesse P. Wolcott

Personal details
- Born: December 2, 1875 Hadley Township, Michigan
- Died: June 23, 1966 (aged 90) Saginaw, Michigan
- Party: Republican

Louis Convers Cramton (December 2, 1875 – June 23, 1966) was a politician and jurist from the U.S. state of Michigan.

Cramton was born in Hadley Township, Michigan and attended the common schools of Lapeer County. He graduated from Lapeer High School in 1893 and from the law department of the University of Michigan at Ann Arbor in 1899. He was admitted to the bar in 1899 and commenced practice in Lapeer. He discontinued the practice of his profession in 1905 and published the Lapeer County Clarion, 1905-1923. He was law clerk of the Michigan Senate for three terms and deputy commissioner of railroads of Michigan in 1907. He was secretary of the Michigan Railroad Commission from September 1907 to January 1, 1909 and a member of the Michigan House of Representatives in 1909 and 1910.

In 1912, Cramton was elected as a Republican to the United States House of Representatives from Michigan's 7th congressional district. He served in the 63rd Congress and the eight succeeding Congresses, from March 4, 1913 to March 3, 1931. In 1930 and 1932, Cramton lost to Jesse P. Wolcott in the Republican primary.

He was special assistant to the U.S. Secretary of the Interior in 1931 and 1932. He led studies of the area around the Colorado River that led to the establishment of the first National Recreation Area, Lake Mead National Recreation Area.

In 1934, he was elected circuit judge of the 40th state judicial circuit, serving from November 21, 1934 to December 31, 1941. He lost his bid for re-election in November 1941. He was a delegate to the 1940 Republican National Convention. In 1945, Cramton received an honorary LL.D., Doctor of Laws, from Howard University. He resumed the practice of law and in 1948 was re-elected to the Michigan House of Representatives, serving 1948-1960.

Cramton died in Saginaw, Michigan and is interred in Mt. Hope Cemetery, Lapeer, Michigan.

Cramton's son, Louis K. Cramton, served in the U.S. Army during World War II and was a member of Michigan House of Representatives from Midland County, 1971-80.

== Interests and accomplishments ==
Yellowstone National Park

Howard University

- Self Guided Tour

Capper-Cramton Act of 1930 protecting natural spaces

- George Washington Memorial Parkway
- Great Falls Park
- Patowmack Canal
- Rock Creek
- Colonial National Monument
  - Jamestown
  - Willimasburg
  - Yorktown
  - Colonial Parkway

1909 The Warner Cramton Law "limiting number of saloons to one for each 500 population passed; also forbidding free lunch, except crackers and pretzels."

U.S. House of Representatives
Preceded by Henry McMorran	United States Representative for the 7th congressional district of Michigan; 1913–1931	Succeeded by Jesse P. Wolcott
