= Jesse P. Wolcott =

American politician (1893–1969)

Jesse Wolcott
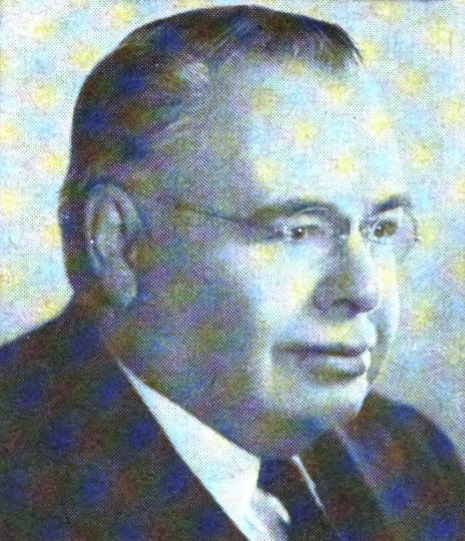

Chair of the Federal Deposit Insurance Corporation
- In office September 17, 1957 - January 20, 1961
- President: Dwight D. Eisenhower
- Preceded by: Ray M. Gidney
- Succeeded by: Erle Cocke, Sr.

Member of the U.S. House of Representatives from Michigan's 7th district
- In office March 4, 1931 – January 3, 1957
- Preceded by: Louis C. Cramton
- Succeeded by: Robert J. McIntosh

Personal details
- Born: March 3, 1893 Gardner, Massachusetts, US
- Died: January 29, 1969 (aged 75) Chevy Chase, Maryland, US
- Party: Republican
- Spouse: Grace Sullivan
- Education: Detroit College of Law

Jesse Paine Wolcott (March 3, 1893 – January 28, 1969) was a politician and soldier from the U.S. state of Michigan.

Wolcott was born to William Bradford Wolcott and Lillie Betsy (Paine) Wolcott in Gardner, Massachusetts and attended the common and high schools there. After moving to Michigan, he attended the Detroit Institute of Technology and graduated from the Detroit College of Law in 1915. He was admitted to the bar the same year and commenced practice in Detroit. In 1927, he married Grace Sullivan.

During the First World War, Wolcott served overseas as a second lieutenant in a machine gun company of the Twenty-sixth Infantry, First Division, from 1917 to 1919. After the war he settled in Port Huron and resumed the practice of law. He served as assistant police judge of Port Huron in 1921, assistant prosecuting attorney of St. Clair County from 1922 to 1926, and prosecuting attorney from 1927 to 1930.

In 1930, Wolcott defeated incumbent U.S. Representative Louis C. Cramton in the Republican Party primary elections. He went on to win the general election to be elected from Michigan's 7th congressional district to the 72nd United States Congress, and was subsequently re-elected to the twelve succeeding Congresses, serving from March 4, 1931 to January 3, 1957. He was chairman of the Committee on Banking and Currency in the 80th and 83rd Congresses, and of the Joint Committee on Economic Report in the 83rd Congress. He was not a candidate for re-nomination in 1956.

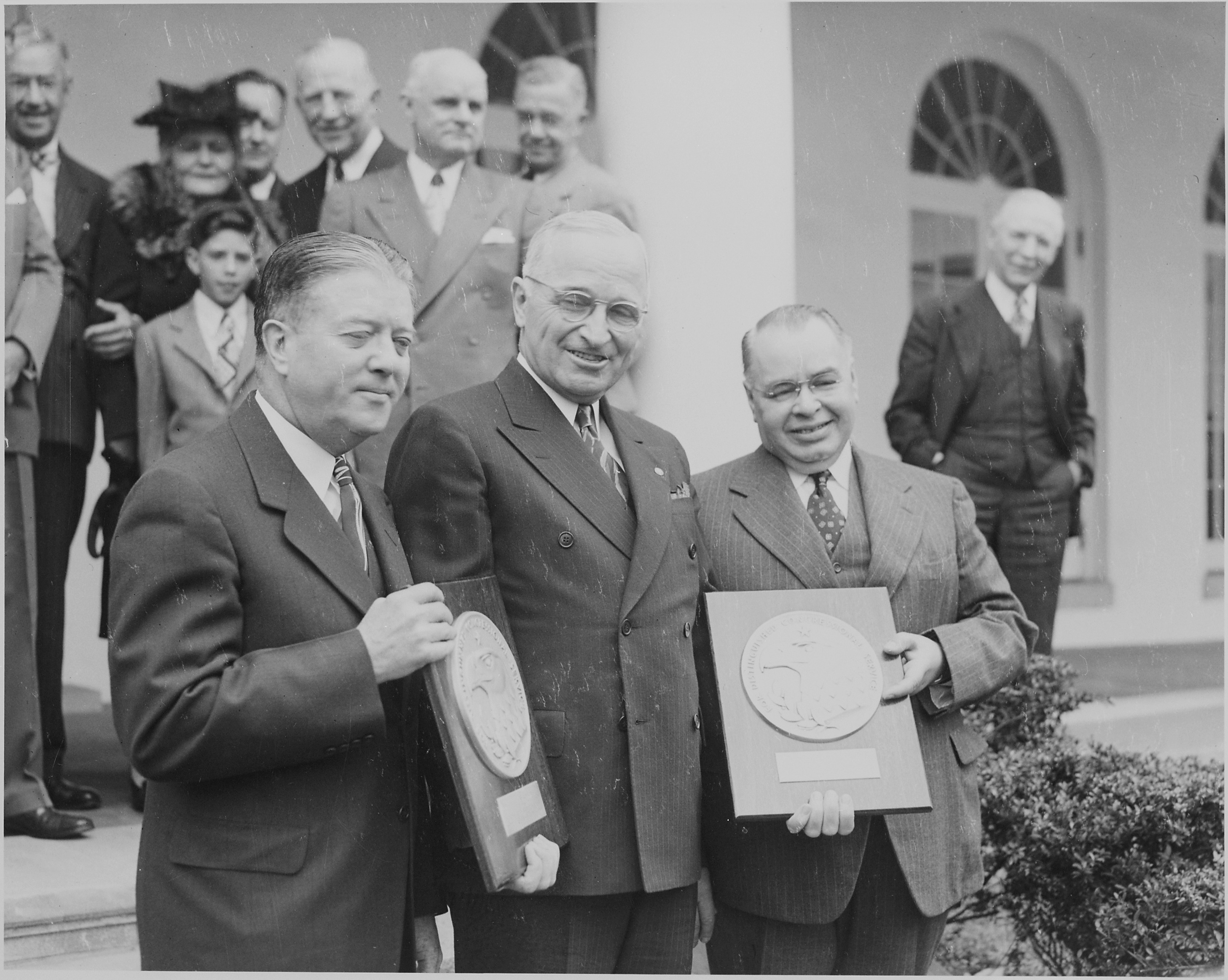
Robert M. La Follette, Jr. (left) and Jesse P. Wolcott (right) receiving the Collier's Congressional Award from President Harry S. Truman (April 17, 1947)

In 1958, Jesse Wolcott was appointed a director of the Federal Deposit Insurance Corporation by U.S. President Dwight Eisenhower and served as chairman until January 1964. He was a Universalist or Congregationalist and a member of American Legion, Veterans of Foreign Wars, Freemasons, Elks, Knights of Pythias, Lions, Moose, and Odd Fellows. He resided in Chevy Chase, Maryland until his death and is interred in Arlington National Cemetery.

U.S. House of Representatives
Preceded by Louis C. Cramton	United States Representative for the 7th congressional district of Michigan; 1931–1957	Succeeded by Robert J. McIntosh
