= Jabez G. Sutherland =

American politician

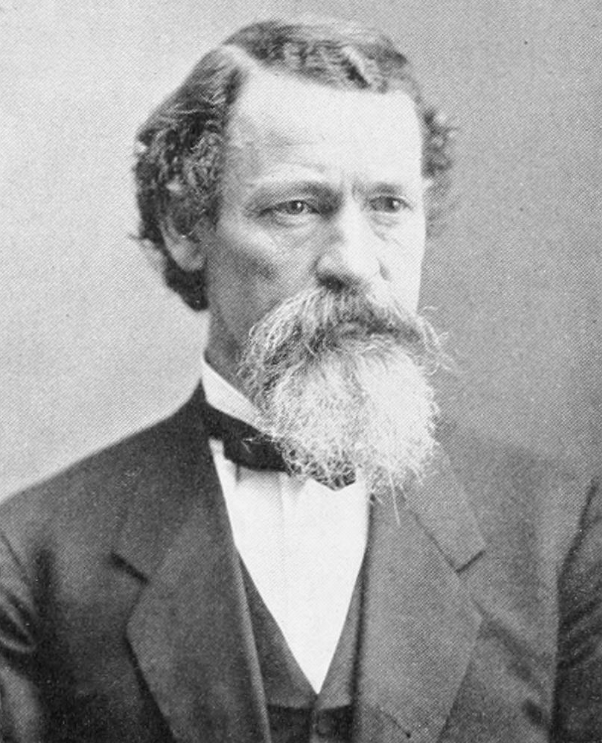

Member of the U.S. House of Representatives from Michigan's 6th district
- In office March 4, 1871 – March 3, 1873
- Preceded by: Randolph Strickland
- Succeeded by: Josiah Begole

Personal details
- Born: October 6, 1825 Van Buren, New York
- Died: November 20, 1902 (aged 77) Berkeley, California
- Party: Democratic

Jabez Gridley Sutherland (October 6, 1825 – November 20, 1902) was a politician and judge from the U.S. state of Michigan.

Sutherland was born in Van Buren, New York. He completed preparatory studies, studied law and was admitted to the bar in 1848. He commenced practice in Saginaw, Michigan and served as prosecuting attorney of Saginaw County in 1848 and 1849.

Sutherland was delegate to the State constitutional conventions in 1850 and 1867 and was a member of the Michigan House of Representatives in 1853. He served as judge of the tenth circuit court of Michigan from 1863 to 1871, when he resigned to enter Congress.

Sutherland was elected as a Democrat from Michigan's 6th congressional district to the 42nd United States Congress, serving from March 4, 1871, to March 3, 1873. He was not a candidate for re-nomination in 1872.

Sutherland moved to Salt Lake City, Utah in 1873 and resumed the practice of law. He was also a member of the faculty of what is now the University of Utah in 1889 and president of the Territorial Bar Association in 1894 and 1895. In 1891 he published the influential legal treatise "Statutes and Statutory Construction," which remains an influential guide for how statutes should be interpreted. He moved to California in 1897.

Sutherland died in Berkeley, California and is interred in Mount Olivet Cemetery in Salt Lake City.

U.S. House of Representatives
Preceded by Randolph Strickland	United States Representative for the 6th congressional district of Michigan; 1871 – 1873	Succeeded by Josiah W. Begole
