= Charles E. Belknap =

American politician (1846–1929)

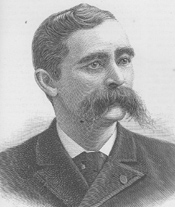

Member of the U.S. House of Representatives from Michigan's 5th district
- In office November 3, 1891 – March 3, 1893
- Preceded by: Melbourne H. Ford
- Succeeded by: George F. Richardson
- In office March 4, 1889 – March 3, 1891
- Preceded by: Melbourne H. Ford
- Succeeded by: Melbourne H. Ford

Mayor of Grand Rapids
- In office 1884–1885
- Preceded by: Crawford Angell
- Succeeded by: John L. Curtis

Personal details
- Born: October 17, 1846 Massena, New York, U.S.
- Died: January 16, 1929 (aged 82) Grand Rapids, Michigan, U.S.
- Party: Republican

Military service
- Rank: Captain
- Unit: 21st Michigan Infantry Regiment

Charles Eugene Belknap (October 17, 1846 – January 16, 1929) was an American politician who served as a U.S. representative from the U.S. state of Michigan.

== Early life and education ==
Belknap was born in Massena, New York and attended the common schools there. He moved with his family to Grand Rapids, Michigan in 1855.

== Civil War ==
During the American Civil War, he enlisted as a private on August 12, 1862, in Company H of the Twenty-first Regiment, Michigan Volunteer Infantry. He was rapidly promoted through several ranks, including:

- Fourth Sergeant, September 1, 1862
- First Sergeant, January 1, 1863
- Sergeant Major of the Regiment, February 1, 1863
- Second Lieutenant, April 1, 1863
- Brevet First Lieutenant, September 22, 1863, for gallant service at the Battle of Chickamauga, by special order of general Sheridan
- Brevet Captain, January 8, 1864, in recognition of services rendered at and near Chattanooga, Tennessee.

He served in the Army of the Cumberland during the Atlanta campaign, and with General Sherman's March to the Sea and through the Carolinas campaign. He was mustered out of service on June 8, 1865, and was breveted to the rank of major. At the battles of Stones River and Chickamauga he received seven wounds, none of them very serious. He later joined the Michigan Commandery of the Military Order of the Loyal Legion of the United States.

== Life after the war ==
After the war, from the fall of 1865 to 1871, Belknap lived on a farm in Sparta, Michigan, before returning to Grand Rapids, where he organized the Belknap Wagon and Sleigh Company, a very successful business that manufactured wagons and sleighs.

Beginning in 1872, Belknap served in the city's volunteer fire service for many years, as both foreman of Company No. 3 and as Assistant Chief. He was instrumental in the transition from a volunteer to a paid fire service. He was a member of the Grand Rapids board of education 1878–1885, served on the board of aldermen from the Seventh Ward 1880–1882, and was mayor in 1884. In 1885, he was appointed by Governor Russell A. Alger as a Trustee of the Institution for the Deaf and Dumb in Flint, Michigan for a term ending in 1891.

== Congressman ==
Belknap defeated Melbourne H. Ford in 1888 to be elected as a Republican from Michigan's 5th congressional district to the United States House of Representatives for the Fifty-first Congress. He served from March 4, 1889, to March 3, 1891. He was not a candidate for re-nomination to the Fifty-second Congress in 1890, but was subsequently elected to fill the vacancy caused by the death of Ford on April 20, 1891. Belknap served from November 3, 1891, to March 3, 1893. He unsuccessfully contested the election of George F. Richardson to the Fifty-third Congress. He performed staff duty at Fort Oglethorpe during the Spanish–American War.

== Death ==
He died in Grand Rapids and is interred in the Greenwood Cemetery there.

== Bibliography ==
Belknap, Charles Eugene. Bentonville: what a bummer knows about it. Prepared by Companion Brevet Major Charles E. Belknap ... read at the stated meeting of January 4, 1893. [Washington: N.p., 1893].

—-. History of the Michigan organizations at Chickamauga, Chattanooga and Missionary Ridge, 1863. Lansing, Michigan: R. Smith printing co., 1897.

—-. The legend of the trailing arbutus. Grand Rapids: The Dean-Hicks press, 1924.

—-. The yesterdays of Grand Rapids. Grand Rapids: The Dean-Hicks company, 1922.

Political offices
Preceded by Crawford Angell	Mayor of Grand Rapids, Michigan; 1884	Succeeded by John L. Curtis
U.S. House of Representatives
Preceded by Melbourne H. Ford	United States Representative for the 5th congressional district of Michigan; 1889 – 1891	Succeeded by Melbourne H. Ford
Preceded by Melbourne H. Ford	United States Representative for the 5th congressional district of Michigan; November 3, 1891 – 1893	Succeeded by George F. Richardson
