= Martha Strickland Clark =

American lawyer

Martha Helen Strickland Clark
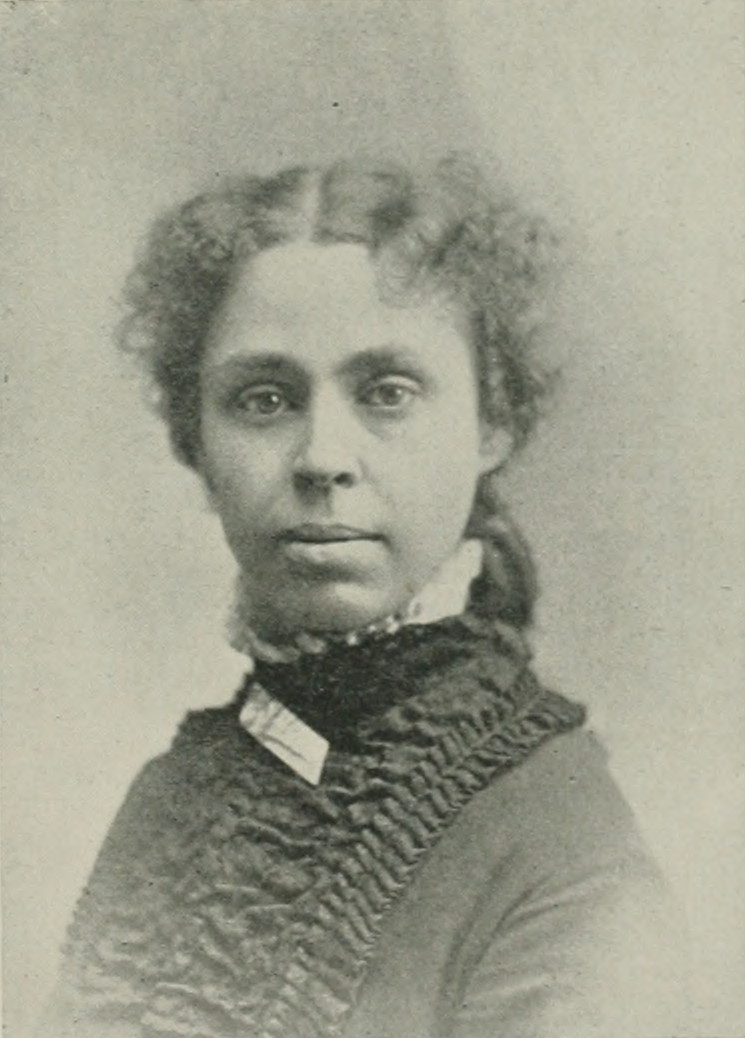
- Born: March 25, 1853; Clinton Co., Michigan
- Died: June 17, 1935 (aged 82); Grand Rapids, Michigan
- Other name: Mattie Strickland-Miller
- Education: University of Michigan Law School
- Occupations: Lawyer and lecturer
- Known for: First woman to argue a case before the Michigan Supreme Court and a member of the Michigan Women's Hall of Fame

Martha Helen Strickland Clark (March 25, 1853 – June 17, 1935) was an American lawyer who was the first woman to practice law in Detroit, and the first woman to argue before the Michigan Supreme Court.

== Biography ==
Clark was born on March 25, 1853, in St. Johns, Michigan, to parents Randolph Strickland and Mary S. Strickland. Her father represented Michigan's 6th congressional district from March 4, 1869, to March 3, 1871, in Congress. During that time, Martha Clark would serve as his private secretary, and spent a year in Utah with Obediah Strickland, a federal judge. At twenty, she studied law with her father for a short time before entering the University of Michigan Law School, where she was the only woman student, and elected secretary of the Webster Club, a popular literary club. However, her failing eyesight led to Clark dropping out after several years. For several years, she lectured and otherwise supported the suffrage cause. Objecting to marriage as an institution "founded on the principle of master and slave," Clark refused to marry, but entered into a domestic partnership contract with Leo Miller in 1875. After seven years, she decided to go back to law school, and graduated the following year.

Clark moved to Saint John's, and served as assistant prosecuting attorney for the county. She was heavily involved in murder cases, which was unusual for a woman of that time. Clark was a delegate to the 1886 Greenback state Convention. While there, she gave a speech that reportedly led to the Greenbacks agreeing on a common candidate, John H. Fedewa. On October 9, 1888, she became the first woman to argue a case in front of the Michigan Supreme Court, Thompson v. Thomson, winning a divorce for an abused wife. The second case she argued was Wilson v. Newton, concerning the right of women to hold the office of deputy county clerk, was decided in her favor. In 1886, she moved to Detroit, and opened a law office there.

Clark served as Secretary of the Detroit Women's Equal Suffrage Association in 1889. In that capacity, Clark proposed a bill which would amend Detroit's city charter to allow "School Suffrage" for women. The bill was passed in two days. Clark lectured at the World's Columbian Exposition. In the 1890s, she became a teacher of Parliamentary law, traveling around the United States to teach. The classes were originally held on the tenth floor of the Hammond Building, before she began traveling. On January 1, 1897, she married her longtime love, Sheldon Clark. Little is known about her subsequent life, but Clark continued to lecture into the 1930s, and was honored by the American Bar Association in 1933, shortly before her death on June 17, 1935. She was inducted into the Michigan Women's Hall of Fame in 2006.
