= Lakeside Cemetery (Port Huron, Michigan) =

Cemetery in St. Clair County, Michigan, US

Coordinates: 43°01′09″N 82°26′09″W

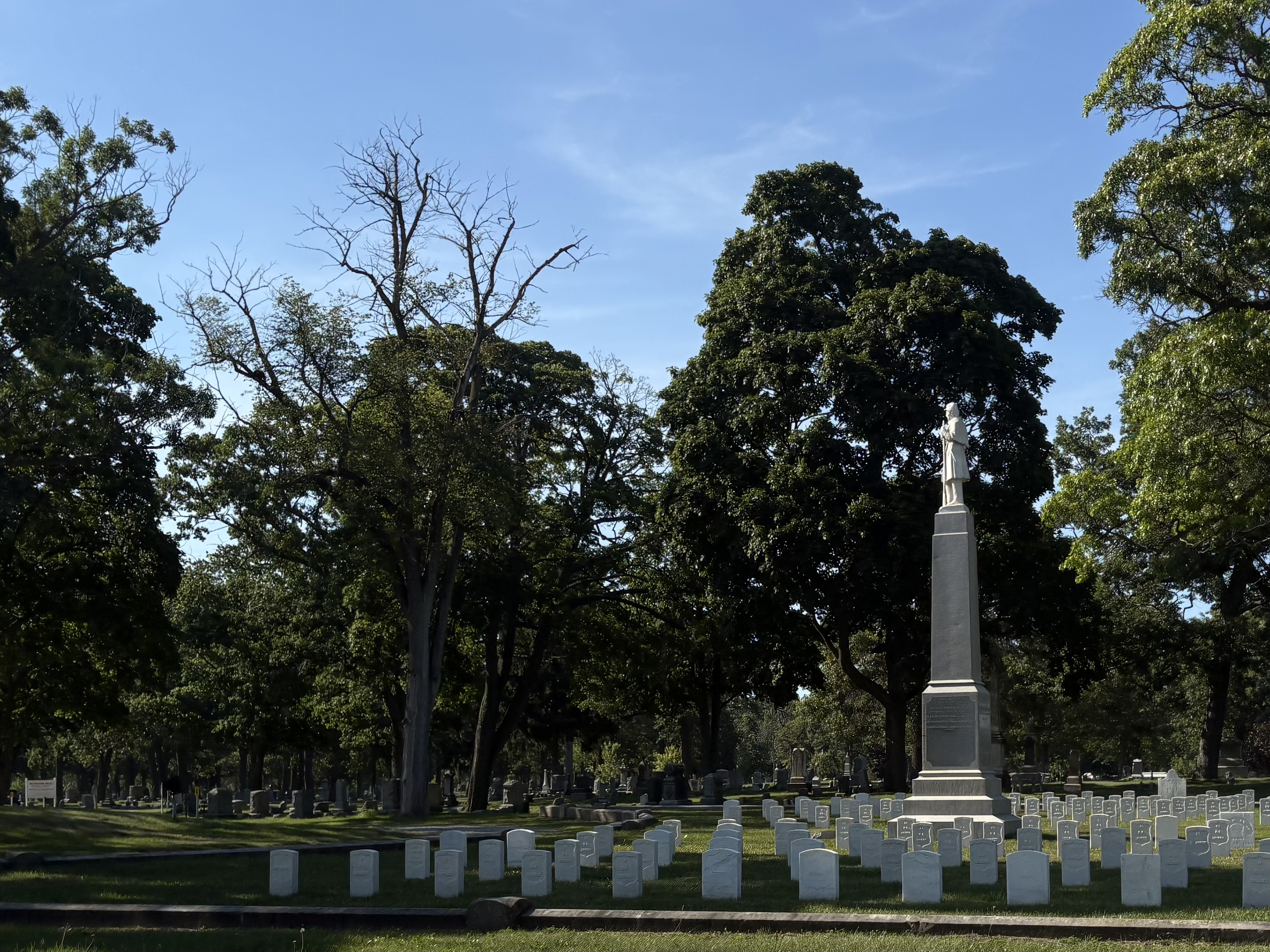
- A view of Lakeside Cemetery with the marble statue of a Union soldier in frame
- Interactive map of Lakeside Cemetery

Details
- Established: 1877
- Location: Port Huron, Michigan
- Size: 96.5 acres (39.1 ha)
- Find a Grave: Lakeside Cemetery

Lakeside Cemetery in Port Huron, Michigan was first established in 1877. The City of Port Huron purchased the original 148 acres (60 ha) from local Port Huron resident John Hoffman. In 1900 the cemetery increased size to a peak of 176 acres (71 ha) but over the years the size has diminished to its current size of 96.5 acres (39.1 ha).

The Lakeside Cemetery also has a "Soldiers Lot" encompassing lots 144–159. This portion of the cemetery was donated by the United States Government in 1881, when the remains of 135 soldiers from Fort Gratiot were entered into the cemetery. Fort Gratiot as two historical installations. The first installation was dated from 1814 until 1821. The second installation was in 1828–1879. Both installations were on the west bank of the St. Clair River approximately two miles South of the cemetery. Of the 135 soldiers buried only remains of 35 soldiers are known. This lot is overseen by the "Great Lakes National Cemetery" organization.

In 1884, the US government dedicated a monument to the Soldiers Lot to honor the 100 unknown soldiers from Fort Gratiot. The soldiers fell victim to the cholera epidemic from July 4–18, 1832. The monument was built by Philo Truesdell from the Port Huron Marble and Granite Works. A statue of marble showing a Union soldier attired in Civil war uniform stands atop the column. The monument is 24 feet (7.3 m) high and cost $1,500 to complete.

== Notable burials ==
- Ezra Child Carleton (1838–1911), US Congressman
- Omar Dwight Conger (1818–1898), US Congressman and Senator
- Henry Gordon McMorran (1844–1929), US Congressman
- Horace Greeley Snover (1847–1924), US Congressman
