= John F. Driggs =

American politician

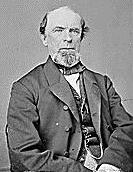

Member of the U.S. House of Representatives from Michigan's 6th district
- In office March 4, 1863 – March 3, 1869
- Preceded by: District created
- Succeeded by: Randolph Strickland

Member of the Michigan House of Representatives from the Saginaw County district
- In office January 1, 1859 – December 31, 1860

Personal details
- Born: John Fletcher Driggs; March 8, 1813 Kinderhook, New York
- Died: December 17, 1877 (aged 64) East Saginaw, Michigan
- Resting place: Forest Lawn Cemetery, Saginaw
- Party: Republican

Military service
- Allegiance: United States of America
- Branch/service: United States Army
- Rank: Colonel
- Unit: 29th Michigan Volunteer Infantry Regiment
- Battles/wars: Civil War

John Fletcher Driggs (March 8, 1813 – December 17, 1877) was a politician from the U.S. state of Michigan.

Driggs was born in Kinderhook, New York. He completed preparatory studies and moved with his parents to Tarrytown, New York, in 1825. He moved to New York City in 1827, where he was an apprentice, journeyman, and master mechanic in the trade of sash, door, and blind manufacturing, 1829–1856. He was superintendent of the New York penitentiary and public institutions on Blackwells Island in 1844

Driggs moved to Michigan in 1856 and engaged in the real-estate business and salt manufacturing. He was president of the common council of East Saginaw, Michigan, in 1858. He was a member of the Michigan House of Representatives, 1859–1860. He was tendered an appointment as colonel during the Civil War and organized the Twenty-ninth Michigan Infantry, July 29, 1864, his son William also served as an officer in the Civil War, serving as 1st Lieutenant of the all Native American Company K of the 1st Michigan Sharpshooters Regiment.

Driggs was elected as a Republican becoming the first person to represent Michigan's 6th congressional district to the 38th, 39th, and 40th Congresses, serving from March 4, 1863, to March 3, 1869. He was one of the committee members appointed to accompany the body of President Abraham Lincoln to Springfield, Illinois, for interment.

Driggs was injured by a fall on the ice in the winter of 1875–1876, as a result of which he died in East Saginaw. He was interred in Brady Hill Cemetery, Saginaw and was re-interred in Forest Lawn Cemetery in Saginaw.

U.S. House of Representatives
Preceded by None	United States Representative for the 6th congressional district of Michigan; 1863 – 1869	Succeeded by Randolph Strickland
