= Robert J. McIntosh =

American politician (1922–2008)

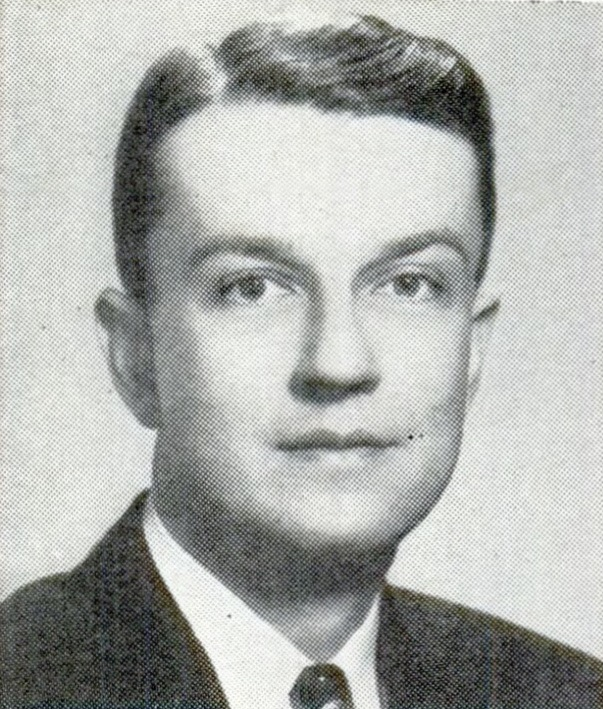

Member of the U.S. House of Representatives from Michigan's 7th district
- In office January 3, 1957 – January 3, 1959
- Preceded by: Jesse P. Wolcott
- Succeeded by: James G. O'Hara

Personal details
- Born: September 16, 1922 Port Huron, Michigan, US
- Died: March 22, 2008 (aged 85) Fort Gratiot, Michigan, US
- Party: Republican

Robert John McIntosh (September 16, 1922 – March 22, 2008) was an attorney, pilot, and politician from the U.S. state of Michigan.

McIntosh was born in Port Huron, Michigan and graduated from Port Huron High School in 1940. He attended Michigan State University, East Lansing from 1940 to 1944. He received a J.D. from the University of Michigan Law School in 1948, and in the same year was admitted to the bar and commenced the practice of law in Port Huron.

McIntosh served in the United States Air Force from 1942 to 1945 and was assigned to the Eighth Air Force in England as a fighter pilot. He served as assistant prosecuting attorney of Saint Clair County from 1949 to 1951 and as postmaster at Port Huron from October 1, 1953, to February 4, 1955. McIntosh was a member of the U.S. House of Representatives' Committee on Un-American Activities (HUAC).

In 1956, McIntosh was elected as a Republican from Michigan's 7th congressional district to the 85th United States Congress, serving from January 3, 1957, to January 3, 1959. McIntosh did not vote on the Civil Rights Act of 1957. He was an unsuccessful candidate for reelection in 1958 and again in 1960, being defeated both times by Democrat James G. O'Hara.

In 1963, McIntosh served as chairman of the Michigan State Public Service Commission. He also served as executive assistant to Michigan Governor George W. Romney from 1964 to 1965 and as director of the Michigan Department of Commerce in 1966. He resumed the practice of law and was a resident of Port Huron, Michigan, and Vero Beach, Florida.

McIntosh died in Fort Gratiot, Michigan, on March 22, 2008. He was buried at Lakeside Cemetery in Port Huron.

== See also ==
- List of members of the House Un-American Activities Committee

== Notes ==
U.S. House of Representatives
Preceded by Jesse P. Wolcott	United States Representative for the 7th congressional district of Michigan; 1957–1959	Succeeded by James G. O'Hara
