= Randolph Strickland =

American politician (1823–1880)

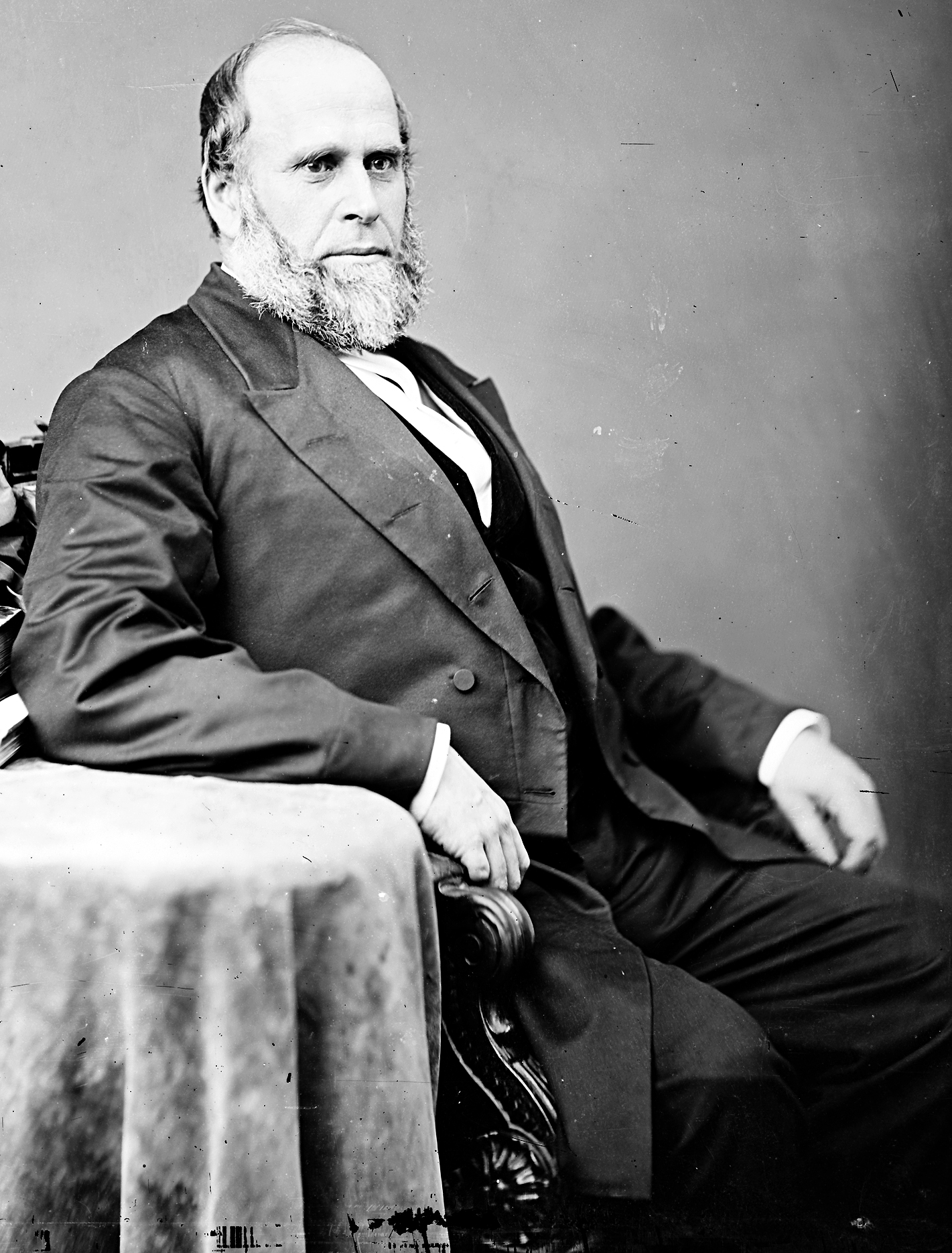

Member of the U.S. House of Representatives from Michigan's 6th district
- In office March 4, 1869 – March 3, 1871
- Preceded by: John F. Driggs
- Succeeded by: Jabez G. Sutherland

Personal details
- Born: February 4, 1823 Dansville, New York
- Died: May 5, 1880 (aged 57) Battle Creek, Michigan
- Party: Republican

Randolph Strickland (February 4, 1823 – May 5, 1880) was a politician from the U.S. state of Michigan.

Strickland was born in Dansville, New York and attended the common schools. He moved to Michigan in 1844 and taught school in Ingham County. He studied law, was admitted to the bar in 1849 and commenced practice in DeWitt, Michigan. He moved to St. John's and continued the practice of law. He was elected prosecuting attorney for Clinton County in 1852, 1854, 1856, 1858, and 1862.

Strickland served as a member of the Michigan Senate from the 22nd district in 1861 and 1862 and provost marshal of the sixth congressional district from 1863 to 1865. He was a delegate to the Republican National Conventions in 1856 and 1868.

In 1868, Strickland was elected as a Republican from Michigan's 6th congressional district to the 41st Congress, serving from March 4, 1869 to March 3, 1871. He was an unsuccessful candidate for re-nomination in 1870.

Strickland was the father of Martha Strickland Clark, who graduated from the law school of the University of Michigan in 1883 and was the first woman to argue a case before the Michigan Supreme Court.

Randolph Strickland resumed the practice of law and died at the age of 57 in Battle Creek, Michigan. He is interred in DeWitt Cemetery of DeWitt.

U.S. House of Representatives
Preceded by John F. Driggs	United States Representative for the 6th congressional district of Michigan; 1869 – 1871	Succeeded by Jabez G. Sutherland
