= Horace G. Snover =

American politician (1847–1924)

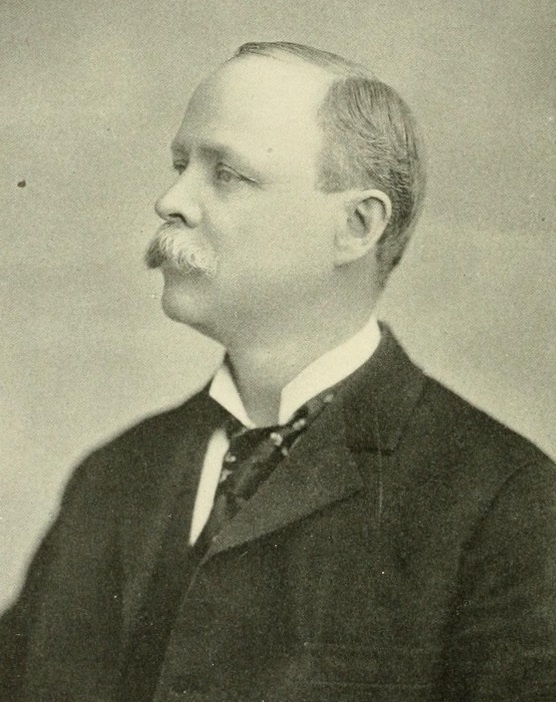

Member of the U.S. House of Representatives from Michigan's 7th district
- In office March 4, 1895 – March 3, 1899
- Preceded by: Justin Rice Whiting
- Succeeded by: Edgar Weeks

Personal details
- Born: September 21, 1847 Romeo, Michigan
- Died: July 21, 1924 (aged 76) Port Huron, Michigan
- Party: Republican
- Education: University of Michigan

Horace Greeley Snover (September 21, 1847 – July 21, 1924) was a politician and judge from the U.S. state of Michigan.

== Biography ==
Horace Greeley Snover was born 21 September 1847 in the then village of Romeo in Macomb County, Michigan, a son of Edward Sharpe Snover and Ann Albertson Cook. His namesake was the abolitionist Horace Greeley. His father was a money lender while his mother was a descendant of early American settlers. They had married in New Jersey then removed to Michigan during the years when a logging economy was transitioning to agricultural investment. Snover was a second great grandson of Garret Albertson, a Major in the New Jersey militia during the American Revolution.

Snover attended the Romeo public schools and the Dickenson Institute. He graduated from the academic department of the University of Michigan at Ann Arbor in 1869 and from the law department in 1871. He was admitted to the bar and practiced in Wichita, Kansas, in 1871 and 1872. The following year he moved back to Romeo and then moved to Port Austin in 1874 while continuing the practice of law. He also engaged in banking and was principal of the public schools of Port Austin for two years. He also served as probate judge of Huron County from January 1, 1881, to January 1, 1885.

Snover was elected as a Republican from Michigan's 7th congressional district to the 54th and 55th Congresses, serving from March 4, 1895, to March 3, 1899, in the U.S. House. The Republicans had the majority and enacted laws such as the 1896 Married Women's Rights Act (District of Columbia), numerous acts to win the Spanish American War, and the Rivers and Harbors Act of 1899 - now the oldest federal environmental law in the United States. He was not a candidate for renomination in 1898.

After leaving Congress, Horace G. Snover moved to Port Huron, where he died at the age of seventy-six and is interred in its Lakeside Cemetery.

The community of Snover in Sanilac County was named for him.

== Notes and references ==
- United States Congress. "Horace G. Snover (id: S000658)". Biographical Directory of the United States Congress.
- The Political Graveyard

U.S. House of Representatives
Preceded by Justin R. Whiting	United States Representative for the 7th congressional district of Michigan; 1895–1899	Succeeded by Edgar Weeks
