= Edgar Weeks =

American politician (1839–1904)

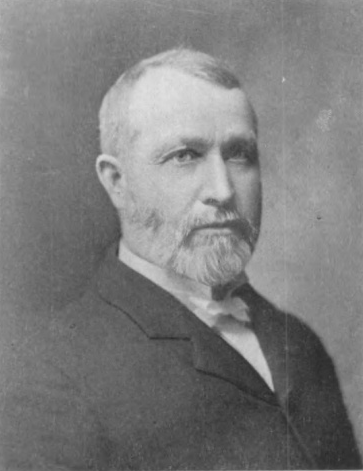

Member of the U.S. House of Representatives from Michigan's 7th district
- In office March 4, 1899 – March 3, 1903
- Preceded by: Horace G. Snover
- Succeeded by: Henry McMorran

Personal details
- Born: August 3, 1839 Mount Clemens, Michigan
- Died: December 17, 1904 (aged 65) Mount Clemens, Michigan
- Party: Republican

Edgar Weeks (August 3, 1839 – December 17, 1904) was a military officer, judge and politician from the U.S. state of Michigan.

== Biography ==
Weeks was born in Mount Clemens, Michigan, where he attended the public schools and learned the printing trade. He studied law and was admitted to the bar in January 1861.

During the Civil War, he served in Company B, Fifth Regiment, Michigan Volunteer Infantry, and was first sergeant of the company. He became first lieutenant and adjutant of the Twenty-second Michigan Infantry in 1862 and captain in 1863. He was appointed assistant inspector general of the Third Brigade, Second Division, Reserve Corps, Army of the Cumberland, in 1863 and was mustered out in December 1863.

After the war, he was proprietor and editor of a Republican newspaper in Mount Clemens and commenced the practice of law in Mount Clemens in 1866. He served as prosecuting attorney 1867-1870 and then as judge of probate of Macomb County, 1870–1876.

He was an unsuccessful candidate for election in 1884 to the 49th United States Congress, but in 1898 was elected as a Republican from Michigan's 7th congressional district to the 56th Congress. He was re-elected to the 57th Congress, serving from March 4, 1899, to March 3, 1903. He was chair of the Committee on Elections No. 3 in the 57th Congress. He was an unsuccessful candidate for renomination in 1902, losing in the Republican primary election to Henry McMorran, who went on to be elected to fill Weeks's seat in the House.

Edgar Weeks resumed the practice of law and died at the age of sixty-five in Mount Clemens, where he is interred in the Clinton Grove Cemetery.

Edgar Weeks' cousin, John W. Weeks, was a U.S. Representative and U.S. Senator from Massachusetts, and U.S. Secretary of War under Presidents Warren G. Harding and Calvin Coolidge.

U.S. House of Representatives
Preceded by Horace G. Snover	United States Representative for the 7th congressional district of Michigan; 1899–1903	Succeeded by Henry McMorran
