= James G. O'Hara =

American politician (1925–1989)

Jim O'Hara
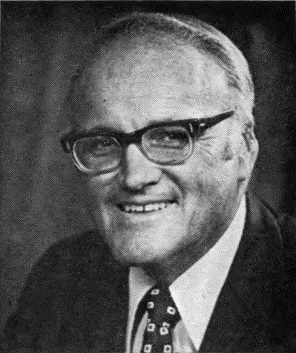

Member of the U.S. House of Representatives from Michigan
- In office January 3, 1959 – January 3, 1977
- Preceded by: Robert J. McIntosh
- Succeeded by: David Bonior
- Constituency: 7th district (1959–1965); 12th district (1965–1977)

Personal details
- Born: James Grant O'Hara; November 8, 1925 Washington, D.C., U.S.
- Died: March 13, 1989 (aged 63) Washington, D.C., U.S.
- Resting place: Arlington National Cemetery
- Party: Democratic
- Education: University of Michigan, Ann Arbor (BA, LLB)

James Grant O'Hara (November 8, 1925 – March 13, 1989) was a soldier and politician from the U.S. state of Michigan, serving as U.S. Representative from 1959 to 1977.

== Early life ==
O'Hara was born in Washington, D.C. He moved with his parents to Michigan in 1939 and graduated from University of Detroit High School in 1943. During the Second World War, he served as an enlisted man in the United States Army with Company B, 511th Parachute Infantry Regiment, U.S. 11th Airborne Division, seeing action in the Pacific Theater of Operations.

After the war, O'Hara graduated from the University of Michigan in 1954 and from the law department of the same university in 1955. He was admitted to the bar in 1955 and commenced the practice of law in Detroit and Macomb County. He was a delegate to the Democratic National Conventions in 1960 and 1968.

== Political career ==
In 1958, he defeated incumbent Republican Robert J. McIntosh to be elected as a Democrat to the 86th United States Congress. He was subsequently re-elected to the eight succeeding Congresses, serving from January 3, 1959, to January 3, 1977. He represented Michigan's 7th congressional district from 1959 to 1965 and after redistricting due to the 1960 census, he represented Michigan's 12th congressional district from 1965 to 1977. Both districts were part of the Metro Detroit area.

O'Hara was not a candidate for reelection in 1976, but instead chose to run for a seat in the United States Senate, after Philip Hart chose not to seek re-election. O'Hara lost in the Democratic primary election to Republican-turned-Democratic Representative Donald W. Riegle Jr. of Flint, who went on to win in the general election. O'Hara resumed the practice of law in Washington, D.C. He was a member, and later chairman, Federal Minimum Wage Study Commission, 1978–1981.

== Personal life ==
O'Hara was a Roman Catholic. He was a resident of Hollin Hills near Alexandria, Virginia, until his death at age 63 from lung cancer at the George Washington University Medical Center in Washington. He is interred in Arlington National Cemetery.

U.S. House of Representatives
Preceded by Robert J. McIntosh	Member of the U.S. House of Representatives from Michigan's 7th congressional district 1959–1965	Succeeded by John C. Mackie
Preceded by John B. Bennett	Member of the U.S. House of Representatives from Michigan's 12th congressional district 1965–1977	Succeeded by David Bonior
