= Axford-Coffin Farm =

- U.S. National Register of Historic Places
- U.S. Historic district
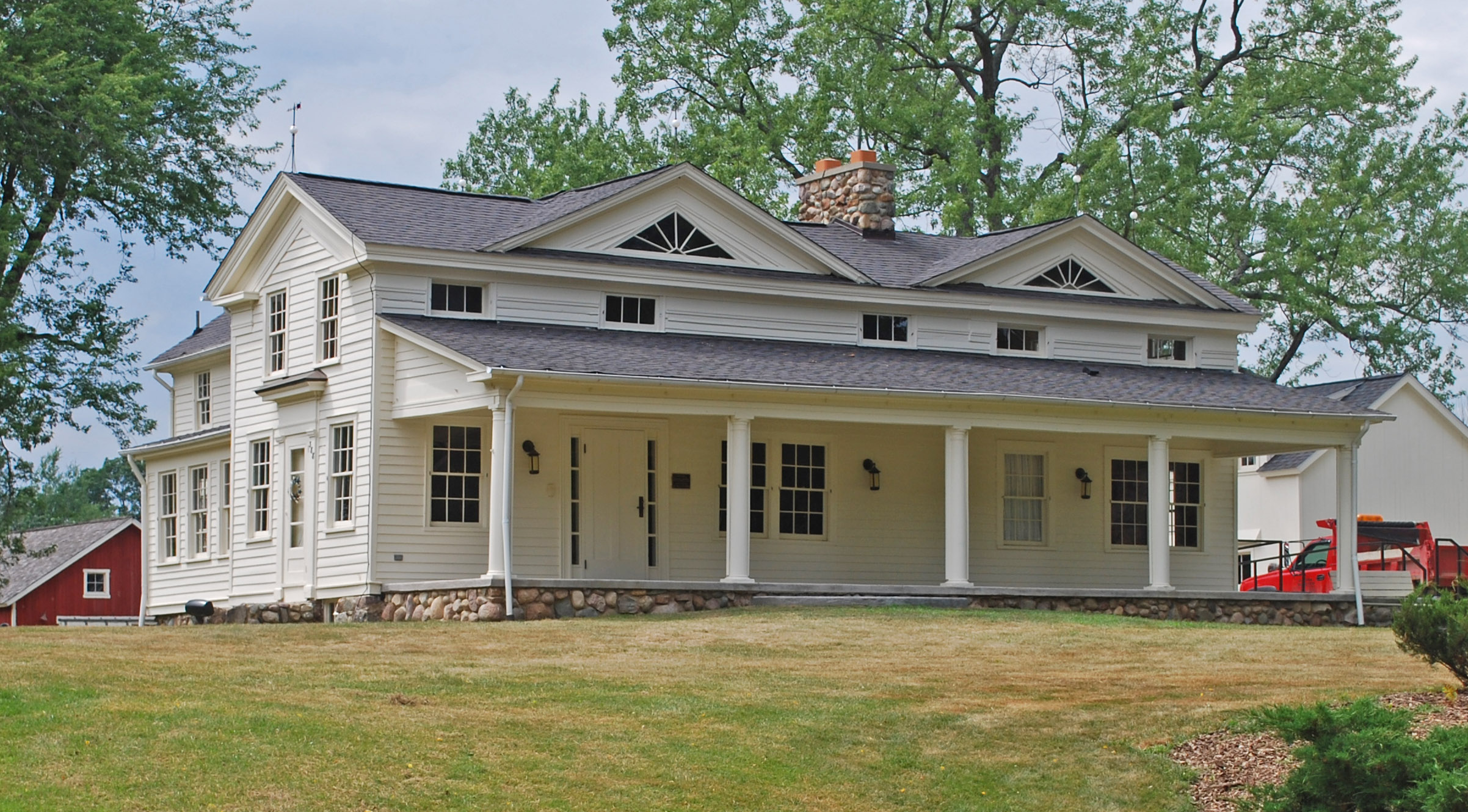

- Location within Michigan Location within the United States
- Interactive map
- Location: 384-388 W. Predmore Rd., Oakland Township, Michigan
- Coordinates: 42°47′10″N 83°8′31″W
- Area: 16.7 acres (6.8 ha)
- Architectural style: Greek Revival, Bungalow/craftsman
- NRHP reference No.: 02000159
- Added to NRHP: March 15, 2002

The Axford-Coffin Farm, also known as Cranberry Lake Farm, is a farmstead located at 384-388 West Predmore Road in Oakland Charter Township, Michigan. It was listed on the National Register of Historic Places in 2002.

== History ==
John Axford purchased this farmstead in 1837, and likely constructed the original frame house at some point in the 1840s. Jacob Kline purchased the farm in 1848, and Kline family continued to own it until 1925. During this time, the farm was likely used to raise dairy cows and fowl. The farm went through multiple owners over the next 15 years, including going through foreclosure in 1929-31. In 1939, Detroit businessman (and later US Congressman) Howard A. Coffin and his wife Abbie purchased the farm and converted it into a country estate.

The Coffins altered and added to the farmstead, creating their estate. It is possible that dairy operations on the farm continued during this time. In 1951, the Coffins sold the property to George H. and Guitenna Williamson. The Williamsons lived in California, and let out the house and farm for a series of uses, including cattle farming, as a group home, house farming, and as a commune.

In 1996, Oakland Charter Township purchased the property, establishing it as "Cranberry Lake Park." The section containing the farmstead was separately designated "Cranberry Lake Farm."

== Description ==
Cranberry Lake Farm is a roughly 16.5 acre parcel within the 167 acre Cranberry Lake Park, which encompasses the entirety of the former Coffin farm property. The farmstead is reached by a gravel drive looping from what is now a parking lot around behind the house and back to the road. The site includes the original farmhouse within the gravel drive loop, and four major outbuildings behind it: a caretaker's house, greenhouse, carriage house, and springhouse. Behind these are two more small outbuildings, and to the west are a silo and the remains of a barn.

The house is a Greek Revival structure, originally built in the 1840s and modernized in the 1930s and 40s. It was originally an upright-and-wing form, and various additions have expanded its footprint. It has a fieldstone foundation, fieldstone chimneys, and wood clapboard siding.

== See also ==
- National Register of Historic Places listings in Oakland County, Michigan
