= Ryan Doyle (artist) =

Visual artist known for large-scale fabricated sculptures

- Notable work: Gon Kirin, Carcroach, Freak Beacon
- Spouse: Zarah Ackerman (performance artist)

Ryan C. Doyle is a visual artist known for his large-scale fabricated sculptures, parade floats, art cars, and sculptures, sometimes involving robotics, animatronics, pyrotechnics, and military technologies. He is from the Twin Cities, Minnesota, and resides in Detroit, Michigan, where he has contributed to permanent installations at The Lincoln Street Art Park and Recycle Here! recycling center.

Ryan Doyle attended the Minneapolis College of Art and Design, and majored in 3D Design and Kinetic Sculpture. He was an apprentice for prop and animatronics artist Christian Ristow after college. Doyle previously lived and worked in New York, NY and Oakland, CA.

Doyle has presented work at: Burning Man, Maker Faire, Coachella, AND festival, The Influencers, Big day Out, Device Art, RoboDock, and Performa. He has also appeared on TV shows including: Junk Yard Wars, Monster Garage, JUNKies, and The Rock’n Roll Acid Test, where he was also on the concept team.

== Work ==
Along with other noted projects, Doyle has contributed fabricated art to Burning Man since 2000, led the Burning Man Department of Public Works (DPW) Metal Shop in previous years, built art cars, and assisted with artist fabrication at the festival.

=== Notable works ===
==== Freak Beacon ====
Freak Beacon is a permanent installation located at Lincoln Street Art Park. It was made by Ryan Doyle, Ben Wolfe, Jon Isbell, and Zeph Alcala in 2017.

==== Carcroach ====
Carcroach is a road legal 2004 Honda Civic EX art car, also referred to as a Burning Man "mutant vehicle". Doyle led the construction of the art car, with the "Detroitus" artist group. Starting in 2020 during the United States racial unrest, the Carcroach has been used as a vehicle in protests and demonstrations. It is also used in parades and other public events.

==== Gon Kirin (GKR) ====
Gon KiRin (GKR) is an art project created by Teddy Lo and Ryan Doyle. This "art car" was designed using metal and LED fixtures to create a dragon onto a deconstructed 1963 Dodge dump truck with a 318 engine. It is 8-tons, measuring approximately 69 ft (21 m) long and 22.5 ft (6.9 m) tall. The dragon is lit with 2,460 ft (750 m) of linear RGB LED lighting fixtures and multiple Traxon wall-washer units.

Gon KiRin has two levels of climbing space with seating for 20+ people in the dragon's mouth and on a couch on its back where riders can move its tail back and forth. A 1,500-pound DJ booth mounted on a Marine Zodiac attack boat sits on the second story. The dragon features a hydraulic neck and a massive flamethrower in its mouth.

Gon KiRin was built in five months by a dedicated 15-person team. It debuted at the 2010 Burning Man, was featured at the Maker Faire and the New York Halloween Parade in 2011, and returned to Burning Man in 2012.

==== Swimming Cities of Serenissima ====
Ryan Doyle was a contributing artist and fabricator for Swimming Cities of Serenissima (2009).

=== Exhibitions ===
==== Lead Artist/Fabricator ====
- "UFO san" ADHOC gallery, Winwood District, Miami, 2009
- "Williamsburg guy" collaboration with street artist UFO 907, ADA Gallery, Richmond VA, 2009
- "Hand of Man tour" with Robochrist Ind, Gold Coast, Adelaide, Melbourne, Sydney, Perth, Australia, 2009
- "Maker's Faire" with Robochrist Ind, San Mateo fairgrounds, San Mateo, California, 2008
- “A Complete Mastery of Sinister Forces: Employed with Callous Disregard to Produce Catastrophic Changes in the Natural Order of Events” with SRL, Robodock, Amsterdam, Netherlands, 2007
- “Movement” with Johnny Amerika, Stagecoach Country Music Festival, Palm Springs, California, 2007
- “Movement” with Johnny Amerika, Coachella Valley Music and Arts Festival, Palm Springs, California, 2007
- “Stairway to hell” with Robochrist, Device Art, Zagreb, Croatia, 2006
- “Bad Kid’s Club#7” Blasthaus Gallery, San Francisco, California, 2006

==== Supporting Artist/Fabricator ====
- "Triptych: Trippy Threesome", Superchief Gallery, August 2016
- "The Regurgitator" Gadgetoff, Staten Island New York, 2010
- "The Influencers 2010" Center of Contemporary Culture of Barcelona, Catalunia, Spain, 2010
- "Bici Muerte" Barcelona, Spain, 2010
- "Skype Video Booth" Reno, Nevada, 2010
- "Squishy Universe" RipIons, Winwood District, Miami, 2009
- "Swimming Cities of Serenissima" with SWOON. Adriatic sea through to Venice Biennalle, Venice Italy, 2009
- "Secret Project Robot" group show fundraiser for the swimming cities. Brooklyn, New York, 2009
- "Anonymous" group show fundraiser for the swimming cities. Lower East Side, New York, 2009
- "Scope NY: Lincoln Center, New York City, 2009
- "Punk Rock Doesn't Dead" Burning Man, Black Rock City, Nevada, 2009
- "Distance Don't Matter" Space 538, Portland, Maine
- "Alleyoup Tour" Carnegie Mellon, Seneca Nation Reservation, and the Watermill Center, 2008
- "Swimming Cities of the Switchbback Seas" with SWOON. Hudson River, NY, 2009
- "Transformazium" group show, Secret Project Robot, Brooklyn, NY, 2009
- “F’ck Art/Let’s Dance” with Japanther, Art Basel, Miami Beach, Florida, 2007
- “Haute Living” with MSTRKRFT, Art Basel, Miami Beach, Florida, 2007
- “Dinosaur Death Dance” with Japanther, ps122, NY, NY, 2007
- “Ex Digitalis Machina” with Robochrist, Robodock, Amsterdam, Netherlands, 2007
- “ Bloodbath” with Robochrist, Virgin Festival, Baltimore, Maryland, 2007
- “Wheel of Power” with Derevo, Mannheim, Germany, 2007
- “Power Tool Drag Races” Maker's Faire, San Mateo, California, 2007
- “Art!” with Chris Hackett, 3rd Ward, Brooklyn, NY, 2006
- “Bike Kill” with Black Label Bike Club, Brooklyn, NY, 2006
- “The Regurgitator” Device Art, Zagreb, Croatia, 2006
- “Pulse Jet Wheelchair” N.I.M.B.Y. Oakland, California, 2006
- “Spider’s Ride” Coachella Valley Music and Arts Festival, Palm Springs, California, 2006
- “Dangerous Curve” with SRL, Los Angeles, California, 2006
