= George D. O'Brien =

American politician

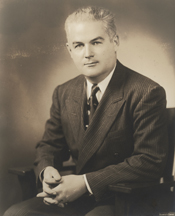
- O'Brien, c. 1943

Member of the U.S. House of Representatives from Michigan's 13th district
- In office January 3, 1937 – January 3, 1939
- Preceded by: Clarence J. McLeod
- Succeeded by: Clarence J. McLeod
- In office January 3, 1941 – January 3, 1947
- Preceded by: Clarence J. McLeod
- Succeeded by: Howard A. Coffin
- In office January 3, 1949 – January 3, 1955
- Preceded by: Howard A. Coffin
- Succeeded by: Charles Diggs

Personal details
- Born: January 1, 1900 Detroit, Michigan, U.S.
- Died: October 25, 1957 (aged 57) Washington, D.C., U.S.
- Party: Democratic
- Spouse: Margaret O'Brien
- Education: University of Detroit (BA); University of Detroit Law School (JD)
- Occupation: Lawyer; politician

Military service
- Allegiance: United States
- Branch: United States Army
- Rank: private
- Conflict: World War I

George Donoghue O'Brien (January 1, 1900 – October 25, 1957) was a politician from the U.S. state of Michigan who served as a member of the U.S. House of Representatives on three occasions.

== Early life and education ==
O'Brien was born in Detroit, Michigan, where he attended the University of Detroit Jesuit High School. During the First World War, O'Brien served as a private and was assigned to the Students' Training Corps. He graduated from the University of Detroit in 1921 and also graduated from the University of Detroit Law School in 1924. He was admitted to the bar in 1924 and commenced practice in Detroit.

== Tenure in Congress ==
In 1936, O'Brien defeated incumbent Republican U.S. Representative Clarence J. McLeod to be elected as a Democrat from Michigan's 13th congressional district to the 75th Congress, serving from January 3, 1937, to January 3, 1939. He lost to McLeod in 1938, but defeated McLeod again in 1940 to be elected to the 77th Congress, and subsequently re-elected to the 78th and 79th Congresses, serving from January 3, 1941, to January 3, 1947. In 1946, he lost to Republican Howard Aldridge Coffin, but defeated Coffin in 1948 to be elected to the 81st Congress and subsequently re-elected to the 82nd and 83rd Congresses, serving from January 3, 1949, to January 3, 1955. In 1954, he was defeated in the Democratic Party primary elections by Charles C. Diggs, Jr., who went on to win the general election.

O'Brien was chairman of the Committee on the Post Office and Post Roads during the 75th Congress and a delegate to the 1944 Democratic National Convention in 1944. He also was an unsuccessful candidate for circuit judge of Michigan's 3rd Circuit in 1947.

== Life after Congress ==
After leaving Congress, O'Brien served as assistant corporation counsel of the District of Columbia, assigned to the Civil Proceedings Division from July 11, 1955, until his death in Washington, D.C.

He is interred at Mount Olivet Cemetery in Detroit, Michigan.

U.S. House of Representatives
| Preceded by Clarence J. McLeod | United States Representative for the 13th congressional district of Michigan; 1937 – 1939 | Succeeded by Clarence J. McLeod |
| Preceded by Clarence J. McLeod | United States Representative for the 13th congressional district of Michigan; 1941 – 1947 | Succeeded by Howard A. Coffin |
| Preceded by Howard A. Coffin | United States Representative for the 13th congressional district of Michigan; 1949 – 1955 | Succeeded by Charles C. Diggs, Jr. |
