= Vincent M. Brennan =

American politician (1890–1959)

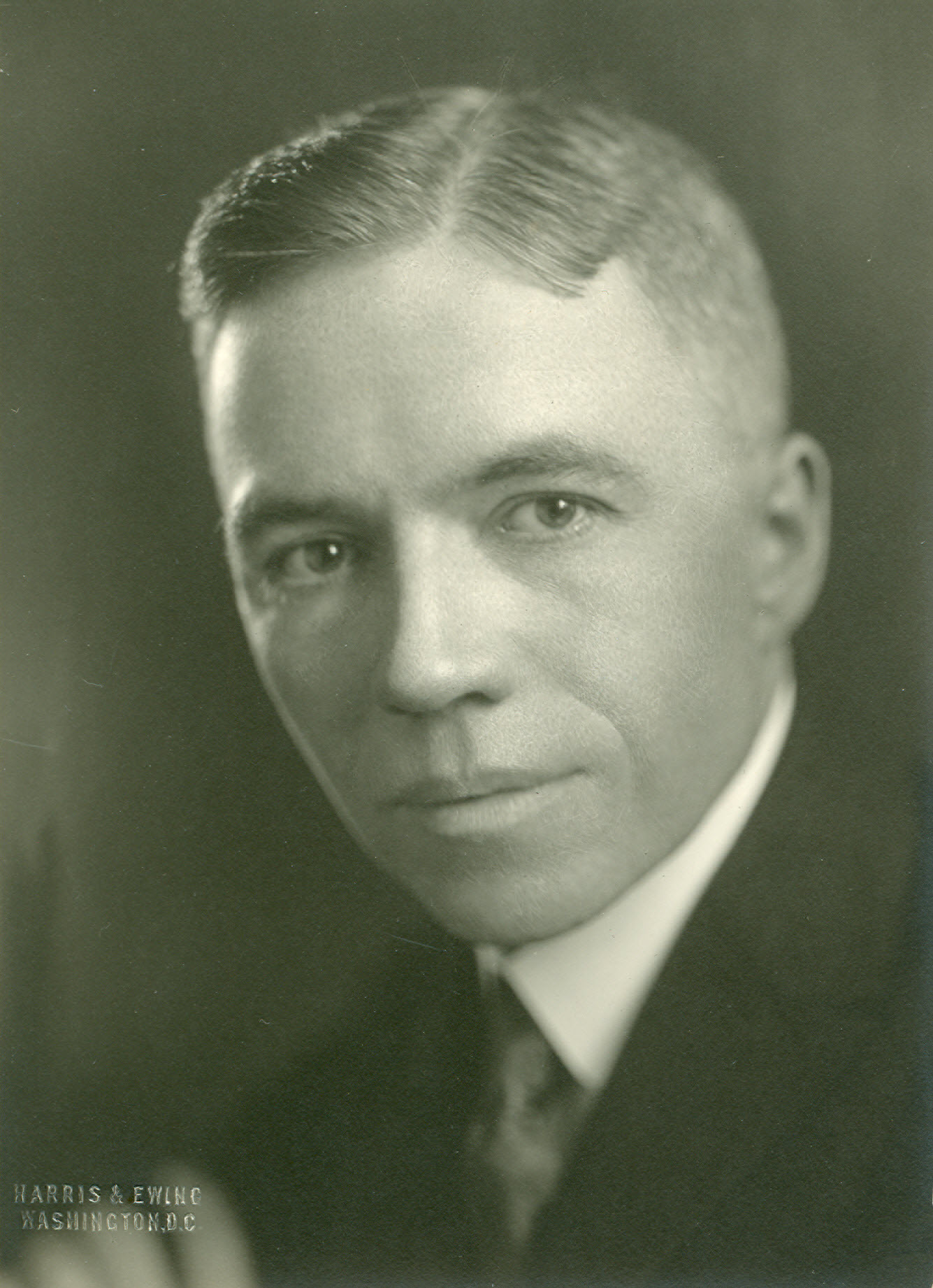

Member of the U.S. House of Representatives from Michigan's 13th district
- In office March 4, 1921 – March 3, 1923
- Preceded by: Clarence J. McLeod
- Succeeded by: Clarence J. McLeod

Personal details
- Born: Vincent Morrison Brennan; April 22, 1890 Mount Clemens, Michigan, U.S.
- Died: February 4, 1959 (aged 68) Detroit, Michigan, U.S.
- Resting place: Sepulchre Cemetery in Southfield, Michigan
- Party: Republican
- Education: Detroit College; Harvard University; University of Detroit

Vincent Morrison Brennan (April 22, 1890 – February 4, 1959) was a politician from the U.S. state of Michigan. He served one term in the United States House of Representatives from 1921 to 1923.

== Early life and education ==
Brennan was born in Mount Clemens, Michigan and moved with his parents to Detroit in 1895. He graduated from SS. Peter and Paul's Parochial School, then from Detroit College in 1909, from the law department of Harvard University in 1912, and from the University of Detroit in 1914. He was admitted to the bar in 1912 and commenced practice in Detroit.

=== Early career ===
He was legal adviser to the Michigan State Labor Department in 1912 and 1913. He then served as assistant corporation counsel for the city of Detroit from 1915 to 1920.

=== State senate ===
He was a member of the Michigan State Senate from the 2nd District in 1919 and 1920. He drafted the automobile traffic ordinance of Detroit, used as a model for many other cities.

=== Affiliations ===
He was also a Catholic and a member of the National Lawyers Guild, Knights of Columbus, and Delta Theta Phi

== Tenure in Congress ==
Brennan was elected as a Republican to the United States House of Representatives from Michigan's 13th congressional district for the 67th Congress, serving from March 4, 1921, to March 3, 1923. He was not a candidate for reelection in 1922. Brennan introduced a bill in 1922, the first that proposed to allow radio coverage of U.S. House of Representatives proceedings. The bill failed, and the idea was not revived until the 1940s.

== After Congress ==
After leaving Congress, he was elected judge of the circuit court of Wayne County, for the term commencing in January 1924 and was reelected for six successive terms, serving until his resignation effective December 31, 1954.

=== Death and burial ===
He then practiced law until his death in Detroit. He is interred in Holy Sepulchre Cemetery in Southfield, Michigan.

U.S. House of Representatives
Preceded by Clarence J. McLeod	United States Representative for the 13th congressional district of Michigan; 1921 – 1923	Succeeded by Clarence J. McLeod
