= Teddy Lo =

Hong Kong artist

- Traditional Chinese: 羅揚文
- Simplified Chinese: 罗扬文
Transcriptions
Standard Mandarin
- Hanyu Pinyin: Luó Yángwén
Yue: Cantonese
- Jyutping: Lo^{4} Joeng^{4}-man^{4}

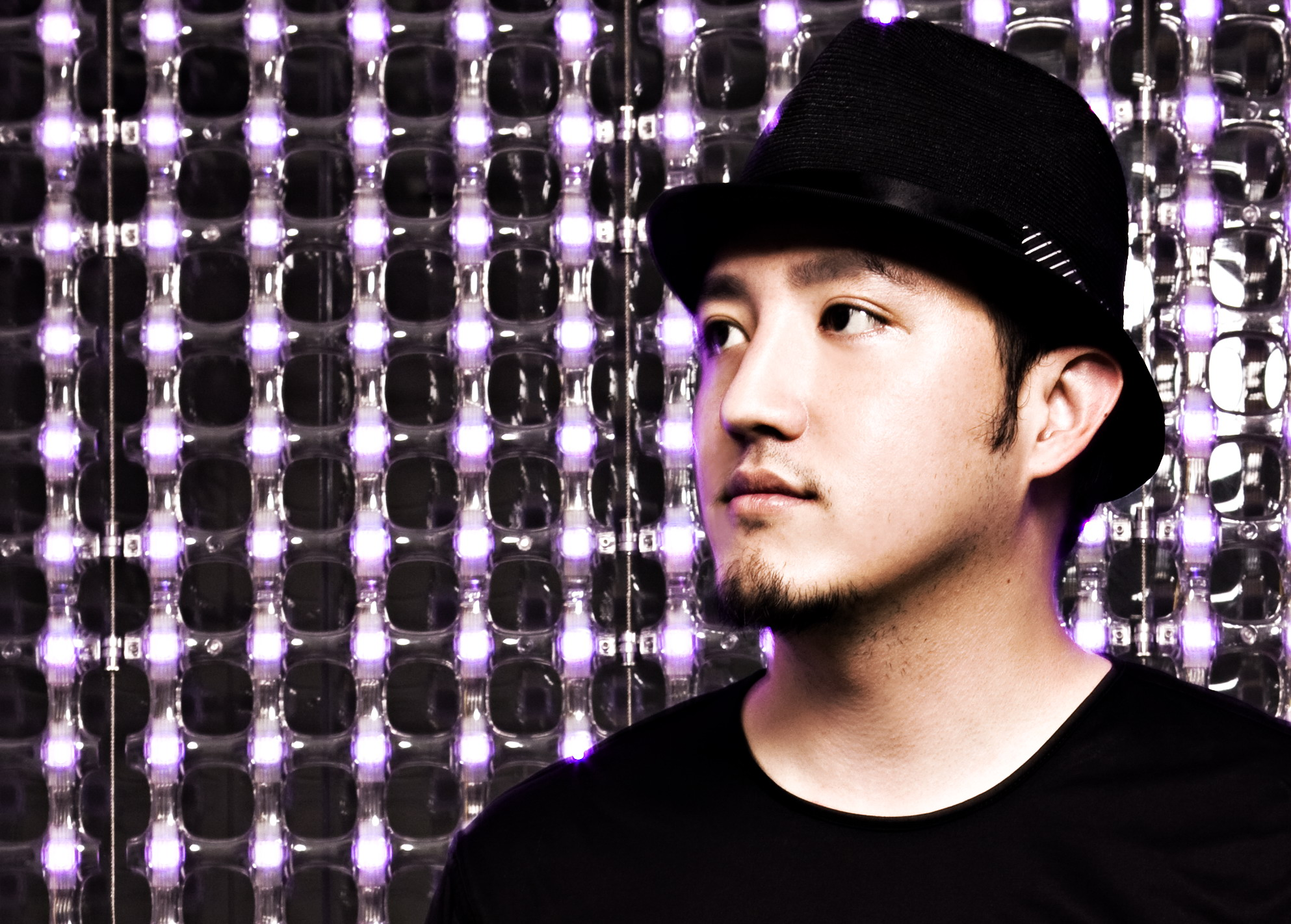
Image of Artist

Teddy Lo (born 1974 in Hong Kong) is a Hong Kong–based artist known for his work with the medium and technology of light, especially LED light. His work explores neo-transcendental ideas in the physical-scientific world.

== Biography ==
Teddy Lo was born and raised in Hong Kong with his father's family background in technological manufacturing and mother was an artist with family background from the deep mountains of Taiwan, making a living as farmers and hunters. While growing up, Lo was captivated by his perceived difference of basic human needs in technology spending his time divided in big metropolitan cities and rural areas. Having been introduced to the works of Claude Monet at a young age, he began to develop a fondness for fine arts.

Later, he had the opportunity to pursue his studies in US, where he developed an interest on conceptual and artistic depth of its advertising industry and contemporary arts. Eventually enrolled in Art Center College of Design in California to complete a BFA degree in art direction. It was during a fine art class and a visit to a lighting factory that inspired the artist to explore LEDs as an artistic medium. After graduation, Lo moved to NYC to work in advertising and continued his artistic journey. He had his first art exhibition at the Arturo Dimodica Gallery, NYC and since then, began working on lighting design projects.

In 2007, Lo moved back to Hong Kong and founded a LED experience design company LEDARTIST. He then earned his Master's degree on Lighting at Queensland University of Technology which led to a career in light art and design. He has since participated in various international art exhibitions and large-scale lighting projects. Lo held exhibitions in prestigious locations around the world, including Luminale in Frankfurt, Asia Society in Hong Kong, Museum of Art and Design in NYC, Shanghai Museum of Contemporary Arts, Art Centre BUDA Kortrijk in Belgium, Hong Kong Museum of Art, Esplanade in Singapore, 798 Art District in Beijing and Burning Man Festival in Nevada, among others. In addition with commission work for the tallest building in China - The Shanghai Tower and created the digital media infrastructure designs for the new World Trade Center in NYC.

== Artist Statement ==
Teddy's creative vision evolves around neo-transcendental art, the integration of spiritual ideas in the physical-scientific world. His work is inspired by current technologies and technological reality. It manifests in artistic expressions through light.

Artificial light is being developed and implemented in society at a rapid pace driven by economic rather than human-sustainable measures. Their team are only at the tip of the iceberg in our current discoveries of the potentials in artificial light to become part of our biological ecosystem. Teddy's art departs from research on light and the electromagnetic spectrum. It evolves from computational graphics, engineering and programming to research in sculptural design, spectrum manipulation and interactivity. During the past decade he has examined how to display colliding data or various states of different particles simulations in 2d or 3d LED artworks, as data visualisation and real time interactive light art. His work utilizes LED technology with refractive reflection of light of color spectra, combining aspects of historical color therapy with a modern approach of lighting design

Having worked with light as a material of art for well over a decade, and belonging to the third generation of a family involved with the invention, production and business of light (from the incandescent light bulb to LEDs), he is concerned with the artistic engagement as well as industrial and societal implementation of light as sustainable and neo-transcendental material. His research and artistic practice depart from a combination of advancements of modern technologies and ancient philosophies on presence and human well-being.

According to the cited source, Teddy Lo views technology as a tool that can support human capabilities while promoting environmental sustainability. His work explores the relationship between technology, nature, and human well-being, emphasizing the integration of technological innovation with environmental responsibility and broader philosophical ideas about the relationship between people and nature.

== Grants and awards ==
| Year | Description | Location | References |
|---|---|---|---|
| 2022 | LIT Lighting Design Awards 2022 Winner-Landscape Lighting | Switzerland | META (UpperPlace) Light Sculpture Installation |
| 2022 | LIT Lighting Design Awards 2022 Winner-Interactive Lighting Product | Switzerland | Winners in Interactive Lighting Products |
| 2018 | A’Design Award Winner, A’Lighting Products and Projects Design Award | Italy | Quintessence Interactive Light Sculpture by Teddy Lo Studio |
| 2017 | Shortlisted for Celeste Prize | UK | Spectrum Manners - Anahata Series #12 |
| 2016 | Shortlisted for Hong Kong a Symphony of Lights | Hong Kong | |
| 2012 | Merit Award, American Institute of Architect | US | |
| 2010 | Project: Shanghai Expo Tibet Pavilion Lighting, Shanghai Lighting Association Awards, Shanghai Lighting Association | China | |
| 2010 | 40 Outstanding Design Professionals Under the age of 40, Art Section, Perspective Magazine | UK | |
| 2009 | Distinguish Brand 2009, South China Media x Capital Entrepreneur | Hong Kong | |
| 2007 | Creative Entrepreneurship Awards, Junior Chamber International | Hong Kong | |
| 2006 | Hong Kong Awards For Industries Innovation and Creativity Certificate Of Merit, Hong Kong General Chamber of Commerce | Hong Kong | |
| 2006 | Optoelectronics Strategic Outlook 2006 (Hong Kong SAR), International Coalition of Optoelectronics Industry Associations | Hong Kong | |
| 2006 | Design Awards, China Semiconductor Lighting Association | | |

== Exhibitions ==
| Year | Description | Location | References |
|---|---|---|---|
| 2021 | Meta | Upperplace Properties, Zhongshan, China | |
| 2021 | Bewildered Universe | House of Beautiful Business Festival, Lisbon | |
| 2020 | Spectrum Manners | Jeeum Gallery, Hong Kong | |
| 2019 | Anahata & Bewildered Universe | Awethetic Gallery, Hong Kong | |
| 2019 | Enter the void | Transcending Dimension Sculpting Space, Pingshan, China | |
| 2019 | Sacred Entities | Sovereign Art Foundation, Hong Kong | |
| 2019 | Bewildered Universe A, Spectrum Manners ii & It Can't Rain All The Time | HK WALLS Clubhouse, Hong Kong | |
| 2018 | Anahata & Bewildered Universe | Spectrum Miami, A&E District, US | |
| 2018 | Anahata | Art San Diego - Wyland Expo Center, US | |
| 2018 | Anahata | On Tour, Plazzo Priuli Bon, Venice, Italy | |
| 2018 | Anahata | On Tour, The Royal Opera Arcade Gallery, London, UK | |
| 2018 | Anahata | Artexpo - Pier 94, New York, US | |
| 2018 | Anahata | Condizione - Elepant Pename, Paris, France | |
| 2018 | Anahata | biennale d'arte contemporanea della brianza, Calolziocorte's Monastery Lecco, lake of Como, Italy | |
| 2018 | 2018 Anahata | Affordable Art Fair, Merlino Bottega d’Arte, Italy | |
| 2018 | 2018 Anahata | Sign, Gesture & Material, Merlino Bottega d’Arte, Italy | |
| 2017 | Quintessence | Lumieres HK, Hong Kong | |
| 2017 | Gon Kirin | Burning Man, Black Rock City, US | |
| 2017 | Anahata Series | Streets of Hong Kong, Awethentic Gallery, Hong Kong | |
| 2017 | Alarm of Hue, Text Me, Waking Life | | |
| 2017 | Spectrum Manners Anahata Series | Art Home: Meditation, Green Art Asia, Hong Kong | |
| 2016 | Gon Kirin | Chalk The Block Arts Festival, El Paso, Texas | |
| 2016 | Spectrum Manner ii | ISEA2016 Open Sky Project, International Commerce Centre, Hong Kong | |
| 2016 | Bacillus | Institute of Contemporary Art London's 70th Anniversary, Harilela Mansion, Hong Kong | |
| 2015 | Dark Matter | Artistes à la une, Palais de Tokyo, Paris | |
| 2015–16 | Seven Keys | Supernova X'mas Luminastic, K11 Art Mall, Hong Kong | |
| 2015 | Positive Void | Clockenflap 2015, Hong Kong | |
| 2014 | Spectrum Manners | SCMP Charity Art Auction, Sotheby's Art Gallery, Hong Kong | |
| 2014 | Bacillus | 1st HK-SZ Design Biennale, OCT Art and Design Gallery, Shenzhen | |
| 2014 | Positive Void | "LOVE", Midtown, Hong Kong | |
| 2013 | Alarm of Hue | Interact, K11 Art Mall, Hong Kong | |
| 2013 | Bacillus | Imminent Domain, Asia Society, Hong Kong | |
| 2012 | Gon Kirin | Burning Man 2012, Black Rock Desert, US | |
| 2012 | Gon Kirin | Maker Faire, New York, US | |
| 2012 | Gon Kirin | Maker's Faire, San Mateo | |
| 2012 | Alarm of Hue, Shades Dynamicism, Waking Life, POV | Transmutation, New York | |
| 2012 | Mega POV | i Light Marina Bay 2012, Singapore | |
| 2011 | Text Me | Legacy and Creations — Ink Art vs Ink Art and Art vs Art, Hong Kong Museum of Art, Hong Kong | |
| 2011 | Spectrum Manners, Shades Dynamicism, Waking Life & Alarm of Hue | ART HK 11, Hong Kong | |
| 2011 | Text Me | Hong Kong Heritage Museum, Hong Kong: Creative Ecologies, Hong Kong | |
| 2010 | Text Me & Theremin | Legacy and Creation – Art vs Art Museum of Contemporary Art, Shanghai | |
| 2010 | POV Series – "Positive Void" | Beijing: The Creators Project, 798 Space, Beijing | |
| 2010 | Gon Kirin | 2010 Burning Man Event, Black Rock Desert, Nevada | |
| 2010 | Phaeodaria | Hong Kong Science Park, Hong Kong | |
| 2010 | POV Series – "Do you see me?" | Hong Kong: Creative Ecologies – Business, Living, Creativity Programme at Shanghai Expo, Shanghai | |
| 2010 | POV Series – "Positive Void" & Theremin | ARTHK 2010, Hong Kong | |
| 2010 | POV Series – "Positive Void" | Luminale 2010, Frankfurt | |
| 2009/10 | The Stage | 2009 HK & SZ Bi-City Biennale of Urbanism\Architecture | |
| 2009 | POV Series – "Do you see me?" | Art Basel 2009, Miami | |
| 2009/10 | POV Series – "Positive Void" | "Fantastic Illusions – Chinese & Belgian Artists", Arts Centre Buda Kortrijk, Belgium | |
| 2009 | POV Series – "Positive Void" | Shanghai eArts Festival 2009, Museum of Contemporary Art, Shanghai | |
| 2009 | PROTOTYPE | I/O, Media Art Gallery, Hong Kong | |
| 2009 | Constant Series | Ztampz Shop, Hong Kong | |
| 2008 | Phaeodaria | Microwave A-Glow-Glow at Hong Kong Museum of Art, Hong Kong | |
| 2007 | Stella | Via Technologies headquarter office building in Beijing, China | |
| 2006 | International visual arts residency | An Tuireann Arts Centre, Isle of Skye, Scotland | |
| 2006 | M.I.S.T. | Innocentre, Hong Kong | |
| 2006 | Cing: Core 65 | The Esplanade, for Singapore National Day | |
| 2006 | Morphology 3.1 | U.F.O. Building, Frankfurt, Germany | |
| 2006 | M.I.S.T. | Traxon Technologies Showroom, Frankfurt, Germany | |
| 2006 | M.I.S.T. | InterTraffic 2006 Expo, Amsterdam, the Netherlands | |
| 2005 | Morphology 2.1 | DDM Warehouse, Shanghai, China | |
| 2005 | Featured artist | Russell Simmons' Art For Life in Hamptons, NY | |
| 2005 | Infinity Car "Study in Red" Campaign | Trinity Square | |
| 2004 | Q | Chung King Building, Hong Kong | |
| 2004 | Ledusoid @ Gonflables! | Tri postal, Lille, France | |
| 2004 | LightRide | Cotco showroom in Science Park, Hong Kong | |
| 2004 | Artery | M5 Seamless Fashion Show, Chicago | |
| 2004 | Starfish | PSI at Volume, Brooklyn | |
| 2004 | Traffika | The ArtExpo 2004 in Jarvis Center, NY | |
| 2004 | Q | Photonics Center lobby in Science Park, Hong Kong | |
| 2003 | Traffika | Boundless 2003, Queens, NYC | |
| 2003 | (Debut) Morphology Solo Exhibit | Studio DiModica, Soho, NYC | |

== Recent Artworks ==
=== 1. BEWILDERED UNIVERSE “PIA03606” ===
Bewildered Universe “PIA03606” is an abstract artwork that conveys the frequency of energy in our universe. Inspired by nebula images by NASA and the concept of time from Chinese I-Ching philosophy, the artwork hypothesizes a transcendental state of energy vibrations with the still imagery. The image captures light travels from thousands of light years ago. Various paint pigments on the image react to an invisible UV spectrum of light. These effects, made with kinetic LED light, depict the relations of the object's distance from planet earth through the speed of light. The calculations follow the theoretical concept of time proposed with the theory of fractal geometry, which differs nature's phenomena in kind by fractal and infinite math. The work explores a neo-transcendental quality of ancient philosophy with modern technology – a bewildered universe beyond our comprehension that affects the consciousness of matter.

(The artwork is a collaboration with AI Artist - MICA)

=== 2. ANAHATA SERIES | CELESTE PRIZE, LONDON, UK ===
Anahata Series incorporated the artist's long time research topic of Chroma-therapy to reinvent the still image of the artist's Spectrum Manners series. The artist has added the vibrational energy by superimposing the image with sacred geometry patterns using both visible and invisible ink. Lit by UV and RGB LEDs, it mirrors an illuminated state of consciousness – making the invisible visible. Additionally, the artist has programmed a specific sequence of spectrum colour on the print image to evoke another dimension of Chroma-therapy and luminous energy for psychological and spiritual healing. Overall, the artwork aims to inspire self-realization through the merging of mind, body and soul.

=== 3. QUINTESSENCE | LUMIERES LIGHT FESTIVAL, HONG KONG ===
The artist believes that humans must embrace imaginative evolvement in accordance with time. There is a need for positive spiritual evolution and enlightenment in all human beings in order for us to advance and live on this planet in harmony. The sculpture is inspired by an astral divine figure – Metatron, whose supreme stature inspires knowledge, ascension and spiritual growth. The white LED light acts as the supreme ray in a manner of a cosmic alchemy.

Quintessence is an ongoing art research project and examines behaviours of a sculpture of the future that is reactive or interactive, whether it is through physical or mental triggers, data or through generative algorithm. An interactive system is designed for the spectators to activate the sculpture by sending the positive energy physically or digitally. Metaphorically, the sculpture collects ‘light codes’ from audiences to be stored as a higher form of ‘intelligent energy’, which bring about personal evaluation, clarity and guidance to influence a collective unconscious of the planet and aid planetary evolution. The Quintessence is a research project of spreading and receiving the importance of "Unity" energy around the world. Which is the next phase of evolutionary goal for human being.

Following a period of social and political change in Hong Kong, the art installation Quintessence was displayed at Lumières Hong Kong. This was the city's first light festival. The project used creative technology to present its message to the public. With the evolvement of aesthetic, human behaviors and technologies, Quintessence will present new interactivities and meanings due to different time and space.

=== 4. SEVEN KEYS | CHI K11 ART SPACE, HONG KONG ===
Seven Keys is an artistic research project by artists, musicians and holistic healers. It is a project about balancing vibrations, frequency and the electromagnetic field for the human being. Ancient colour chambers are simulated with the aid of 21st century aesthetics and technologies. Through triggering the five senses with sensual elements in seven designated spaces, the goal of this project is to create a positive, blissful environment and eventually bringing epiphany and calmness to human consciousness. Collaborating Artists Angela Flame x Magnolia May Polley x Teddy Lo

=== 5. TECHNO NATURE – BACILLUS | ASIA SOCIETY, HONG KONG ===
The world is going through technological advancements and our habitat is evolving towards more efficient, intuitive and environmentally sustainable standards. New technology allows electronics to become more compact and flexible, which make organic electronic sculptures more practical. The first sculpture of the artist's Techno Nature Series, the Bacillus sculpture signifies and represents a new breed of techno inspired sculptures. The concept of the form comes from the oldest known single-celled organism, the Bacillus, dating back 250 million years. For the sculpture's expression the artist merges the old with the new; the old method of structural welding with the new luminous technology, 3D prototyping and interactive systems. The Bacillus is equipped with luminosity, sensory and audio capabilities. The sound and visual sequences are activated by the viewer's interaction in response to the sculpture's visual clues, which in turn elicits various ‘emotional’ states from the Bacillus. Single or multiple viewers can produce different behaviors from the piece resulting in an experience of Synesthesia.

=== 6. VICTORIA HARBOUR SPEKTRUM | HONG KONG ===
In January 2004, Hong Kong's Secretary of Finance, Tourism Commission, and the Hong Kong Tourism Board joined forces to commission the first “A Symphony of Light” light and music spectacle for Victoria Harbour. Named the ‘World's Largest Permanent Light and Sound Show’ by Guinness World Records, the light show is based on synchronized sound, lasers and dynamic illumination of over 47 significant buildings in Hong Kong starting at 8pm every evening lasting 13 minutes. These buildings overlook the city's famous Victoria Harbour that is unarguably the most significant attraction for the 60 million tourists that visit Hong Kong annually. Since its inception, the competition has been illuminating; the Eiffel Tower's lighting system is upgraded every other year, while the Vivid Sydney Festival and Singapore's Marina Bay are continuously refreshing their displays by inviting creative artists to display new and innovative visual projections. Teddy Lo Studio is introducing the Victoria Harbour Spektrum project with a showcase on the growth of local talent, so that anyone with a creative mind may paint the sky on what could become the world's largest digital canvas.

=== 7. POSITIVE VOID | 798 Art District, Beijing, China / Museum of Contemporary Art (MOCA), Shanghai / Museum of Contemporary Art (MOCA), Shanghai ===
Positive Void is an interactive light installation using LED technology and persistence of vision. The work was presented in the 798 art district in Beijing and was also exhibited at the Museum of Contemporary Art (MOCA) in Shanghai.The omnipresence of digital information is overwhelming. Billboards, web advertisements, viral marketing, social media – advertising is an inescapable presence in the contemporary society to the point where it has become an expected, practically ignored part of the modern landscape.

=== 8. PHAEODARIA | HONG KONG MUSEUM OF ART ===
The marine-inspired, information-based lighting installation Phaeodaria act as an energy capsule that interplay LEDs with the wireless technology of Hong Kong. It represents the underlying energy and information flowing through the heart of Hong Kong with LEDs programmed to react to the invisible frequencies and radiation in the information age: from GSM to Bluetooth, 3G to Wi-Fi signals.

=== 9. MEGA POV | LIGHT MARINA BAY FESTIVAL, SINGAPORE ===
This is an installation that utilizes the technique of persistence of vision to animate objects with motion and lights. This digital installation presents motion with digital programming and flickers of light through light-emitting diodes. The artwork is a study of how digital information can be delivered to our human visual system through this reverse technique, even within a limited projection area. This art piece is meant to remind you of the essence of life and that nothing is trivial in this world. Mega POV is exhibited as one of the installations in the Singaporean sustainable light art festival, I Light Marina Bay in 2012.

=== 10. GON KIRIN | BLACK ROCK CITY, USA ===
Gon KiRin (GKR) is an art project created by Lo in collaboration with Ryan Doyle. This art car was designed using metal and LED fixtures to create a dragon onto a deconstructed 1963 Dodge dump truck with a 318 engine. It is an 8-ton beast, measuring approximately 69 ft (21 m) long and 22.5 ft (6.9 m) tall. The dragon is lit with 2,460 ft (750 m) of linear RGB LED lighting fixtures and multiple Traxon wall-washer units.

Gon KiRin has two levels of climbing space with seating for more than 20 people in the dragon's mouth and on a party couch on its back where riders can move its tail back and forth. A 1,500-pound DJ booth mounted on a Marine Zodiac attack boat sits on the second story. The dragon features a hydraulic neck and a massive flamethrower in its mouth.

Gon KiRin was built in five months by a dedicated 15-person team. It debuted at the 2010 Burning Man as a Mutant Vehicle. It was also featured at the Maker Faire and the New York Halloween Parade in 2011. GKR returned to Burning Man again in 2012.

== Creative contributions ==
- Media art consultant for Hong Kong Art Development Council
- Board of director of Microwave Media Art Group
- Board of director of Hong Kong Ambassador of Design
- Main organizer of This Happened Hong Kong
