= Lincoln Street Art Park =

Sculpture park in Detroit, Michigan

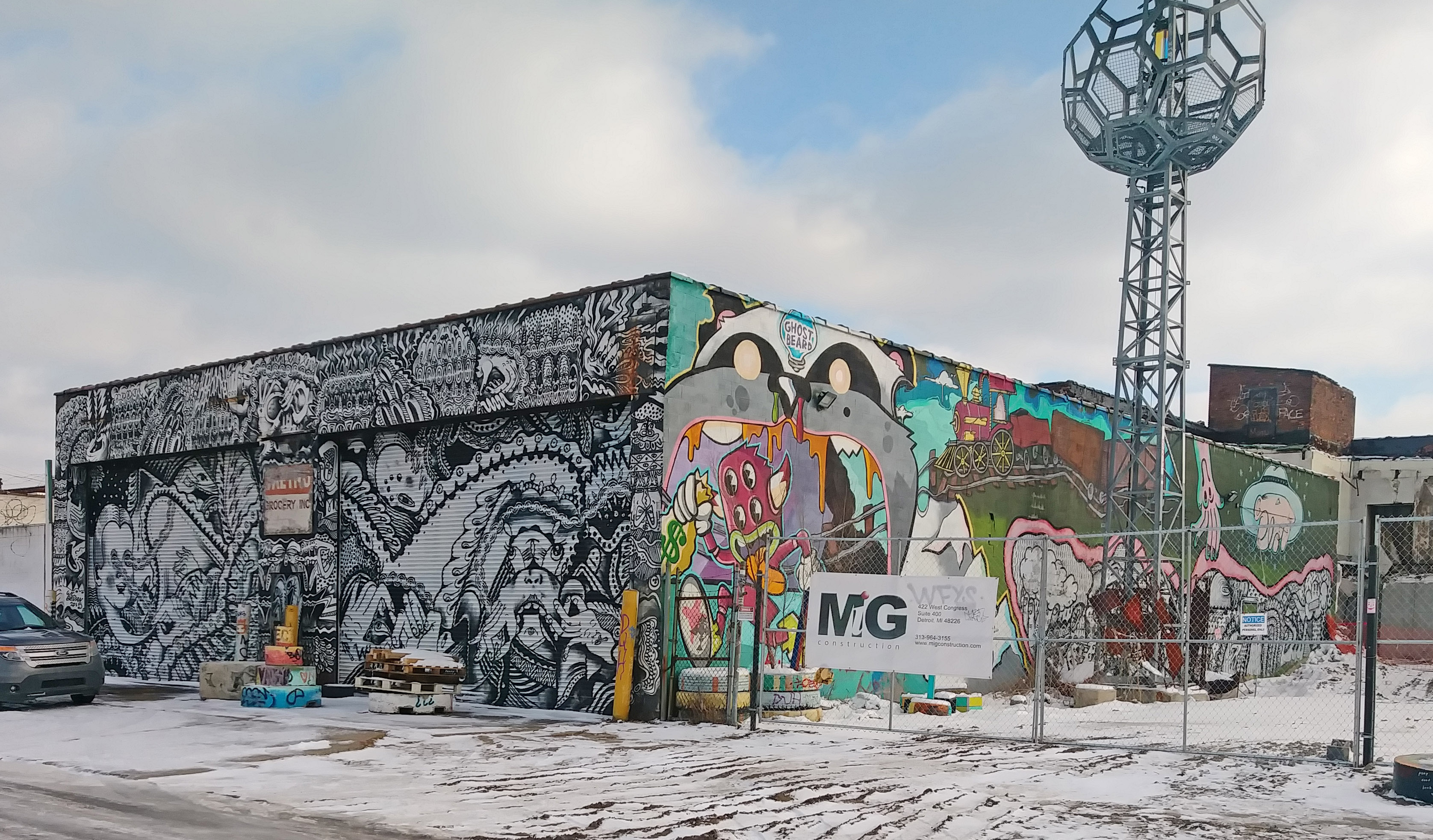
- Interactive map of Lincoln Street Art Park
- Type: Sculpture park
- Location: 5962 Lincoln Street, Detroit, Michigan, 48208, U.S.
- Coordinates: 42.36162778856851°N 83.0825270098648°W
- Area: 1 acre (0.40 ha)
- Founder: Matthew Naimi
- Operator: Make Art Work
- Open: October 30, 2011
- Website: makeartworkdetroit.com

The Lincoln Street Art Park is a sculpture garden and outdoor art gallery located in the Northwest Goldberg neighborhood in Detroit, Michigan. The Lincoln Street Art Park includes murals, street art, site-specific installations made from salvaged materials, and a stage. It is behind the Recycle Here! drop-off facility, and parts of the park pass under a railroad viaduct.

The property includes the Warren Motor Car Company Building a once Lincoln Motor Car Company factory, listed on the National Register of Historic Places in 2020.

== History ==
The Lincoln Street Art Park started as a 2011 community effort to clean up an industrial, vacant area on the Recycle Here! recycling center property. The efforts to remove illegally-dumped material from the lot were organized by Matthew Naimi, James Willer, and Michelle Demercuria. Some of the material from the vacant lot was salvaged and used for Park building materials, including pathways and a bonfire pit. Organizers then worked with local muralists and sculpture artists to refurbish existing structures, and developed spaces for outdoor recreation and cultural events. A Kickstarter campaign helped support the initial creation of the park.

On October 30, 2011, the park opened under the name, “The Lincoln Street Sculpture Garden”. The park was renamed to Lincoln Street Art Park in 2012. Over the course of the Park's history, community members continue to organize and steer events/programming, with the requirement that activities within the space adopt 3 principles: Never exclude anyone from a gathering; Never sell anything or charge any money on the property; and “Share your candy."

In 2017, the nonprofit Make Art Work was formed by organizer Matthew Naimi, to give structure to the ideas of community-space making and sustainability. In 2020, the Lincoln Street Art Park closed for remodeling and redesign, and was reopened in July, 2023.

In 2022, work began on Dreamtroit, a mixed-use affordable living complex located on the property. The development involves a new structure within the Warren Motor Car Company Building and 70+ affordable housing units focused on artists and makers, as well as commercial units.

== Recycle Here! ==
Recycle Here! is a recycling center and drop-off facility located at the Lincoln Street Art Park, that opened in 2007.

In 2010 the 501c3, Green Living Science, was created by Recycle Here! to extend the work of the recycling center into educational outreach in the Detroit Public Schools and other public programs.

== Art and Installations ==
Artistic projects at Lincoln Street Art Park are commonly made of salvaged materials, some sourced from the Recycle Here! recycling center.

"The content of the park is constantly changing and as a result generates a new urban landscape constantly in flux where the public can enjoy some of the salvaged materials that Recycle Here offers [as] a medium to the local creative community."

— Ana Morcillo Pallares, "Hold, Denote or Reserve: Spatial Strategies in Detroit’s Available Space", (2016)

=== Permanent works ===
- Freak Beacon (2017), Artists: Ryan Doyle, Ben Wolfe, Jon Isbell, and Zeph Alcala. Brendan Burke designed permanent lighting for the installation.

=== Former/temporary works ===
- Metal sculptures by Robert Sestock, Sean Hages, John Sauve, and Eddy Bullock
- Murals by Malt, WC Bevan, Carl Oxley III, Ghostbeard, Bana Kablan, and TEADout

== Reception ==
The Lincoln Street Art Park has been described by press sources as an accessible, autonomous space focused on encouraging self-expression and community engagement. Playground Detroit called the space, “one of the city’s most beloved destinations for not only recyclers, but artists and creatives."

Brian Brown discussed the city of Detroit's support of “neighborhood-based public art" as part of a city-wide urban planning and revitalization strategy.

== See also ==
- Recycle Here!
- Warren Motor Car Company Building
