= Howard A. Coffin =

American politician

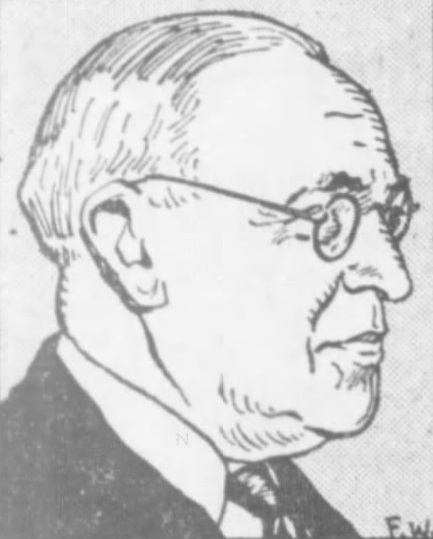
- Detroit Free Press, October 30, 1946

Member of the U.S. House of Representatives from Michigan's 13th district
- In office January 3, 1947 – January 3, 1949
- Preceded by: George D. O'Brien
- Succeeded by: George D. O'Brien

Personal details
- Born: June 11, 1877 Middleborough, Massachusetts, U.S.
- Died: February 28, 1956 (aged 78) Washington, D.C., U.S.
- Party: Republican
- Education: Brown University

Howard Aldridge Coffin (June 11, 1877 – February 28, 1956) was a politician from the U.S. state of Michigan. Alongside Harold F. Youngblood, he remains the last Republican to represent any part of Detroit in congress, as of 2024. Both men were elected in the Republican wave year of 1946, only to lose re-election two years later in 1948.

== Biography ==
Coffin was born in Middleborough, Massachusetts and attended the Vermont Academy at Saxtons River. He graduated from Brown University, Providence, Rhode Island, in 1901 and was a teacher in the Providence Friends School that same year.

He worked as a representative for the book publishers, Ginn & Company, 1901-1911; controller, Warren Motor Car Company, Detroit, Michigan, 1911-1913; manager, Firestone Tire and Rubber Company, of Michigan, 1913-1918; secretary, Detroit Pressed Steel Company, 1918-1921; assistant to president, Cadillac Motor Company, of Detroit, 1921-1925; vice president and later president, White Star Refining Company, 1925-1933; general manager, Socony-Vacuum Oil Company, 1933–1946.

In 1946, Coffin was elected as a Republican to the United States House of Representatives from Michigan's 13th congressional district, defeating former Representative Clarence J. McLeod in the Republican primary and going on to defeat incumbent Democrat George D. O'Brien in the general election. Coffin served in the 80th Congress, from January 3, 1947 to January 3, 1949. In a re-match, Coffin lost to O'Brien in the general election of 1948.

Coffin's one-term in the House was of low-impact. He introduced no public bill and spoke only seven times on the floor, but he successfully moved two amendments dealing with conversions to natural gas.

Coffin organized the Industrial Service Bureau in Washington, D.C., and was a business consultant until his retirement in 1954. He died in Washington, D.C., in 1956 and is interred in Woodlawn Cemetery, Detroit, Michigan.

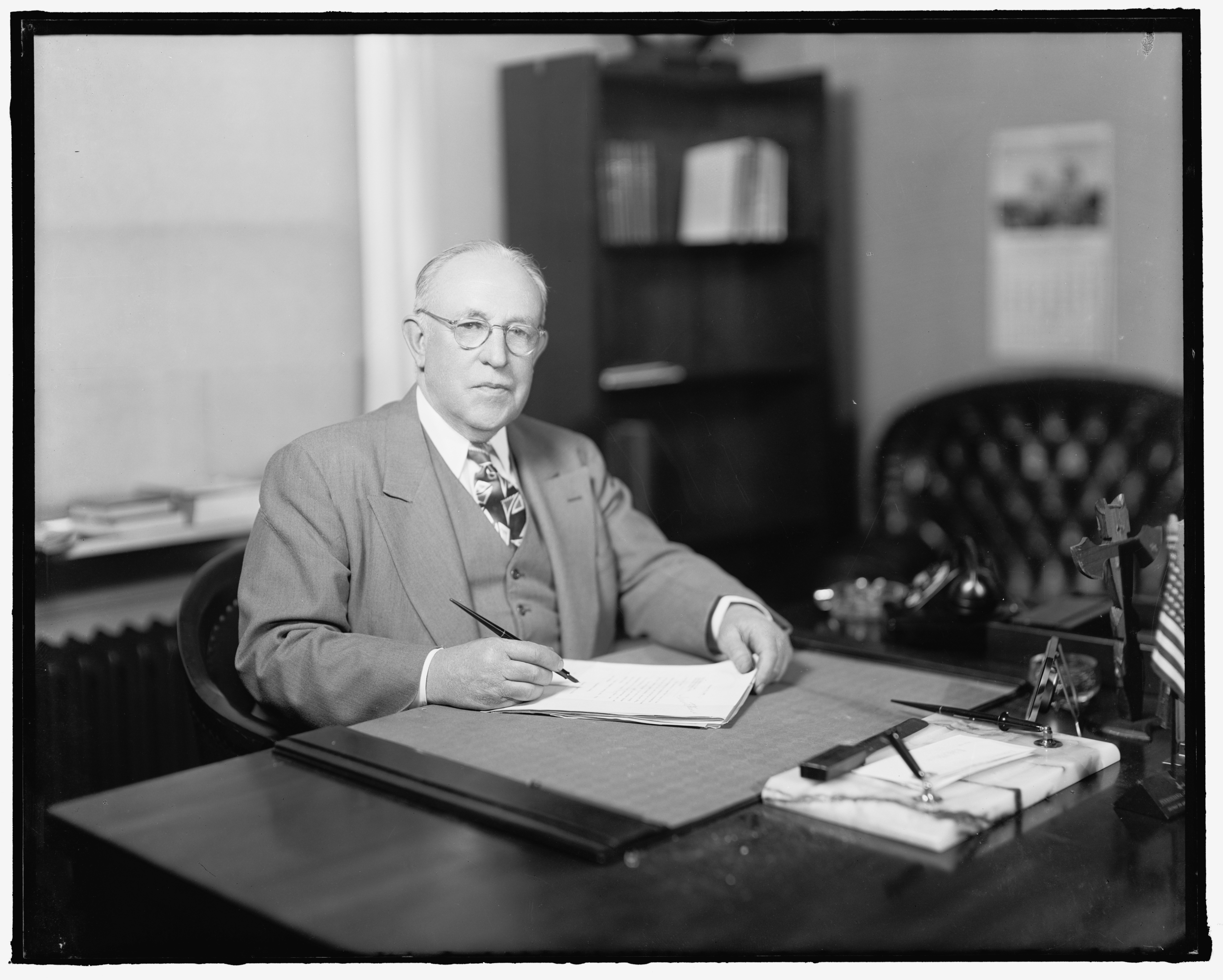

U.S. House of Representatives
Preceded by George O'Brien	United States Representative for the 13th Congressional District of Michigan; 1947 – 1949	Succeeded by George O'Brien
