= Charles Diggs =

American politician (1922–1998)

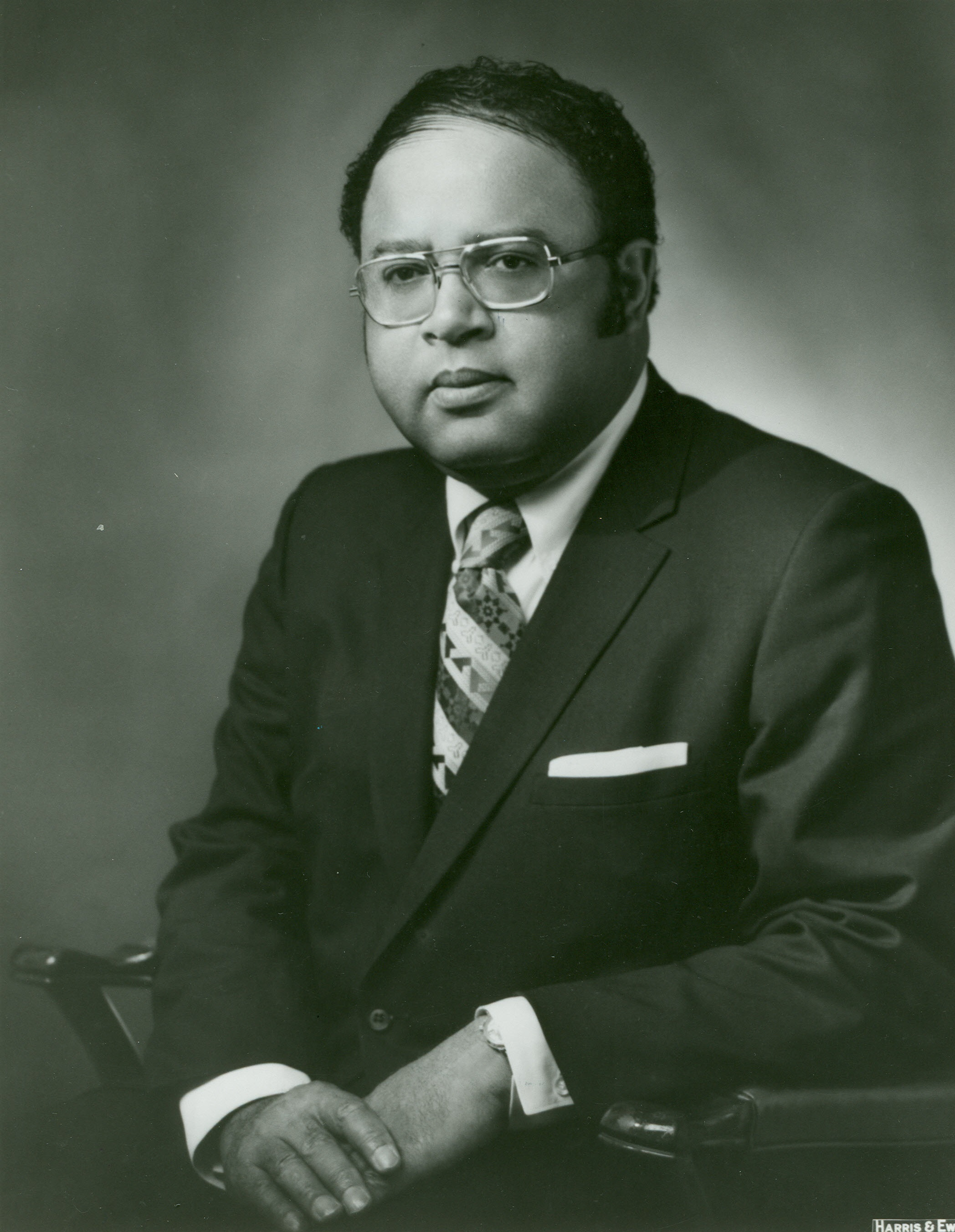

Chair of the House District of Columbia Committee
- In office January 3, 1973 – January 3, 1979
- Preceded by: John L. McMillan
- Succeeded by: Ron Dellums

Member of the U.S. House of Representatives from Michigan's 13th district
- In office January 3, 1955 – June 3, 1980
- Preceded by: George D. O'Brien
- Succeeded by: George Crockett Jr.

Member of the Michigan Senate from the 3rd district
- In office 1951–1954
- Preceded by: Henry Kozak
- Succeeded by: Cora Brown

Personal details
- Born: Charles Coles Diggs Jr. December 2, 1922 Detroit, Michigan, U.S.
- Died: August 24, 1998 (aged 75) Washington, D.C., U.S.
- Party: Democratic
- Spouse: Anna Johnston (m. 1960; div. 1971)
- Education: University of Michigan (attended); Fisk University (attended); Wayne State University (BS); Michigan State University

Military service
- Branch/service: United States Army
- Years of service: 1943–1945
- Battles/wars: World War II

Charles Coles Diggs Jr. (December 2, 1922 – August 24, 1998) was an American politician from the U.S. state of Michigan who served in the state senate and U.S. House of Representatives. He was the first African American elected to Congress from Michigan.

A member of the Democratic Party, Diggs was an early participant in the civil rights movement. In September 1955, the Michigan Representative garnered national attention when he attended the trial of the two white Mississippians accused of murdering Emmett Till. He was elected the first chairman of the Congressional Black Caucus, which he was also one of the main founders of, and was a staunch critic of the apartheid regime in South Africa.

Diggs resigned from the United States House of Representatives and served 14 months of a three-year sentence for mail fraud, although he maintained his innocence.

== Early life ==
Born in Detroit, Michigan, Charles was the only child of Mayme E. Jones Diggs, and Charles Diggs Sr. He attended the University of Michigan, Detroit College of Law (1952-52), and Fisk University. He served in the United States Army from 1943 to 1945. After his discharge, Diggs worked as a funeral director. He served as a member of the Michigan Senate from the 3rd district 1951–54, just as his father had from 1937 to 1944.

He was rooted in his family's business, the House of Diggs, which at one time was said to be Michigan's largest funeral home.

== Political career ==
In 1954, Diggs defeated incumbent U.S. Representative George D. O'Brien in the Democratic Party primary elections for Michigan's 13th congressional district. He went on to win the general election to the 84th Congress and was subsequently re-elected to the next twelve Congresses, serving from January 3, 1955, until his resignation June 3, 1980.

The first African American to be elected to Congress in Michigan, Diggs made significant contributions to the struggle for civil rights. In April 1955, three months after he was first sworn in to Congress, he gave a well-received speech to a crowd of about 10,000 in Mound Bayou, Mississippi, at the annual conference of the Regional Council of Negro Leadership (RCNL), probably the largest civil rights group in the state. His host was the RCNL's leader, Dr. T.R.M. Howard, a wealthy black surgeon and entrepreneur.

Later that same year, Diggs returned to Mississippi, where he received national attention as the only congressman to attend and monitor the trial of the accused killers of Emmett Till, a black teenager from Chicago who was murdered during a trip to the state. The outrage generated by the case gave a tremendous momentum to the emerging civil rights movement. Although he was a member of Congress, the sheriff did not exempt him from Jim Crow treatment. Diggs had to sit at a small table along with black reporters. Soon after the trial concluded, white mobs began to search for the witnesses involved in the case, including then-18-year-old Willie Reed. Diggs personally escorted Reed to Detroit, after a nighttime escape from Reed's home in Drew, Mississippi to Memphis, Tennessee. There the young man changed his name to Willie Louis for safety.

Following the trial, Diggs continued the fight for justice, calling upon President Eisenhower to call a special session of Congress to consider civil rights.

Diggs is acknowledged to have been the main founder of the Congressional Black Caucus' predecessor the "Democratic Select Committee," which he chaired from 1969 to 1971.

In 1969, Diggs was appointed to the post of chairman of the Subcommittee on Africa of the Committee on Foreign Affairs, where he strongly advocated ending apartheid in South Africa. He was a committed publicist for the liberation cause in South Africa, and his 'Action Manifesto' (1972) displayed his support for the armed struggle against apartheid. In it, Diggs criticized the United States government for decrying the use of such violence when it failed to condemn measures used by the South African government to subjugate the majority of its own people. Diggs also argued that American corporations were propping up the apartheid government through their investments, and he was banned from South Africa by its government for these positions.

Diggs was a founding member and the first chairman of the Congressional Black Caucus, a group of African-American representatives and senators working to address the needs and rights of black constituents. While chairman, Diggs successfully led a caucus boycott of President Nixon's State of the Union Address, following Nixon's refusal to meet to discuss issues relevant to African Americans. This and similar work contributed to Diggs being named on the Master list of Nixon political opponents.

In March 1978, Diggs was charged with taking kickbacks from staff whose salaries he raised. He was convicted on October 7, 1978, on 11 counts of mail fraud and filing false payroll forms. Diggs insisted he had done nothing wrong, and was re-elected while awaiting sentencing. He was censured by the House on July 31, 1979, and resigned from Congress June 3, 1980. He was sentenced to three years in prison and served 14 months.

== Personal life ==
Diggs died of a stroke at Greater Southeast Community Hospital in Washington, D.C. He is interred at Detroit Memorial Park in Warren, Michigan.

== See also ==
- List of African-American United States representatives
- List of American federal politicians convicted of crimes
- List of United States representatives expelled, censured, or reprimanded

U.S. House of Representatives
Preceded by George D. O'Brien	Member of the U.S. House of Representatives from Michigan's 13th congressional district 1955–1980	Succeeded by George Crockett Jr.
New office	Chair of the Congressional Black Caucus; 1969–1972	Succeeded by Louis Stokes
Preceded by John L. McMillan	Chair of the House District of Columbia Committee; 1973–1979	Succeeded by Ron Dellums
