= Clarence J. McLeod =

American politician (1895–1959)

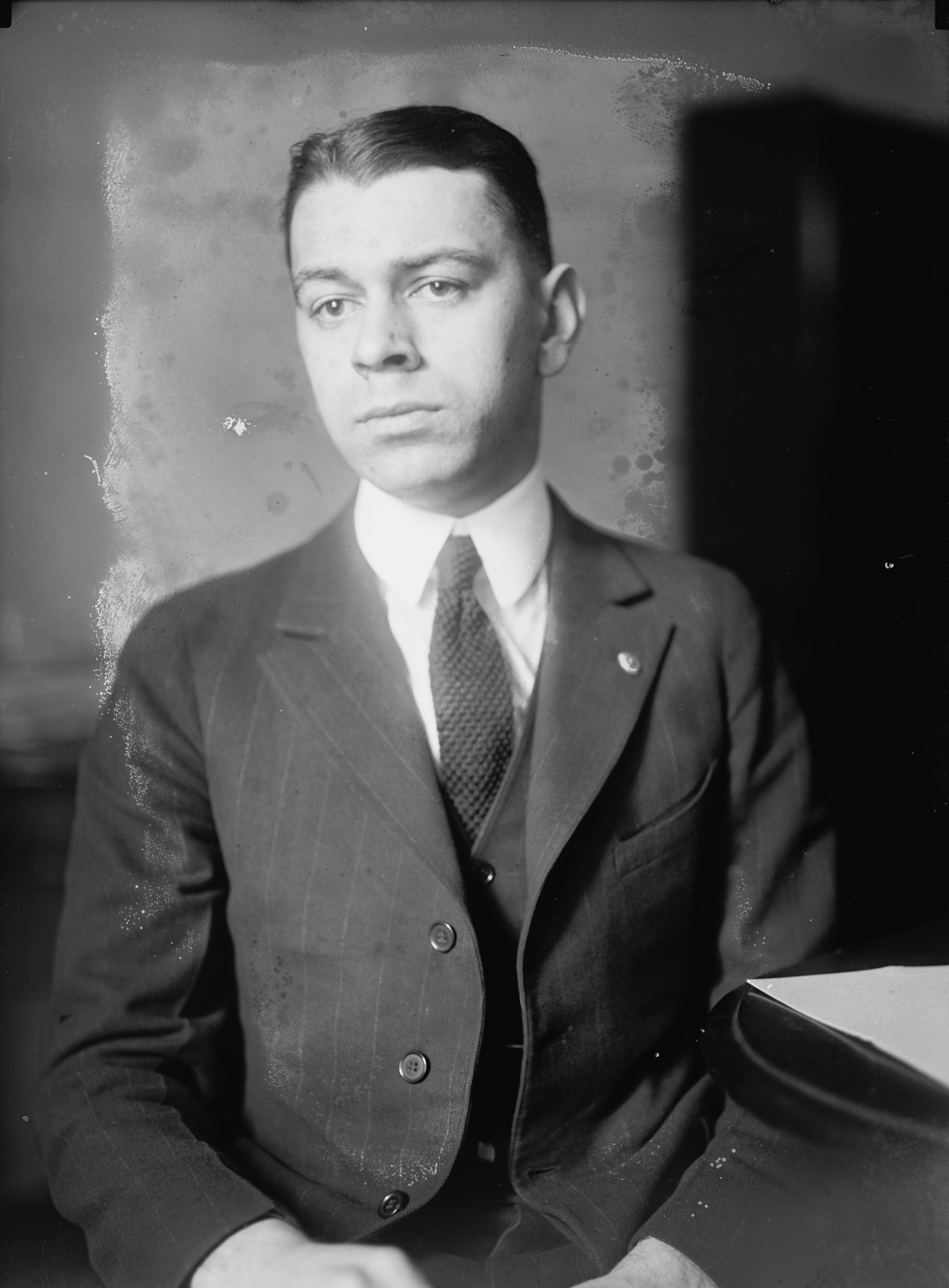

Member of the U.S. House of Representatives from Michigan's 13th district
- In office November 2, 1920 – March 3, 1921
- Preceded by: Charles A. Nichols
- Succeeded by: Vincent M. Brennan
- In office March 4, 1923 – January 3, 1937
- Preceded by: Vincent M. Brennan
- Succeeded by: George O'Brien
- In office January 3, 1939 – January 3, 1941
- Preceded by: George O'Brien
- Succeeded by: George O'Brien

Personal details
- Born: July 3, 1895 Detroit, Michigan, U.S.
- Died: May 15, 1959 (aged 63) Detroit, Michigan, U.S.
- Party: Republican

Clarence John McLeod (July 3, 1895 – May 15, 1959) was a politician from the U.S. state of Michigan who served as a member of the U.S. House of Representatives.

McLeod was born in Detroit, Michigan, the son of a well-to-do Scottish father who had served as collector of internal revenue in Detroit. He attended the public schools and the University of Detroit. He graduated with an LL.B. from the Detroit College of Law in 1918. He was a member of Delta Theta Phi.

== Military service ==
During the First World War, McLeod served as a private in the aviation section at the ground school, Cornell University, Ithaca, New York, and as sergeant in the Intelligence Division. He accepted appointment on May 12, 1919, as second lieutenant in the Officers' Reserve Corps, and successively as captain, major, and lieutenant colonel. He was admitted to the bar in 1919 and commenced the practice of law in Detroit.

== Political career ==
In November 1920, McLeod was elected as a Republican from Michigan's 13th congressional district to the 66th United States Congress to fill the vacancy caused by the death of Charles A. Nichols. McLeod served from November 2, 1920, to March 3, 1921. At the time, McLeod was the youngest person ever elected to Congress, being just five months over the age of 25—the minimum age required by the U.S. Constitution. Furthermore, McLeod was a candidate only to fill the unexpired term of Nichols. At that same election, Vincent M. Brennan was simultaneously elected to a full term in the 67th Congress.

In 1922, however, McLeod was elected to the 68th Congress and subsequently re-elected to the six succeeding Congresses, serving in the House of Representatives without interruption from March 4, 1923, to January 3, 1937. He was an unsuccessful candidate in the Republican primary election for governor of Michigan in 1934. In 1936, he lost to Democrat George O'Brien in the general election for the 75th Congress. In 1937, McLeod was an unsuccessful candidate for the Republican nomination for mayor of Detroit.

In 1938, McLeod defeated O'Brien to be elected to the 76th Congress, serving from January 3, 1939, to January 3, 1941. McLeod lost to O'Brien in 1940, 1942, and 1944. In 1946, McLeod was defeated for the Republican nomination by Howard Aldridge Coffin, who then went on to defeat O'Brien in the general election. McLeod won the Republican nomination in 1950 and 1952, but lost both times to O'Brien in the general election.

== Later life ==
After leaving Congress, McLeod returned to the practice of law and was a consultant to the administrator of the Federal Civil Defense Administration. He died in Detroit in 1959 and was interred in the city's Mount Olivet Cemetery.

== Notes ==
U.S. House of Representatives
Preceded by Charles A. Nichols	United States Representative for the 13th congressional district of Michigan; 1920 – 1921	Succeeded by Vincent M. Brennan
Preceded by Vincent M. Brennan	United States Representative for the 13th congressional district of Michigan; 1923 – 1937	Succeeded by George O'Brien
Preceded by George O'Brien	United States Representative for the 13th congressional district of Michigan; 1939 – 1941	Succeeded by George O'Brien
