= Charles Archibald Nichols =

American politician

Charles A. Nichols
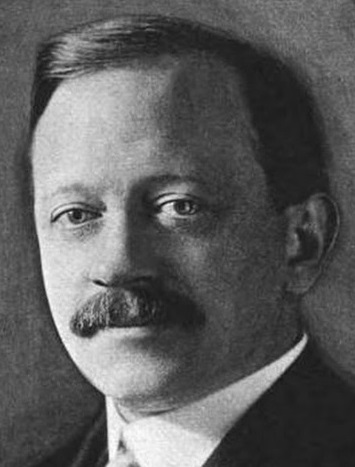
- Frontispiece of 1922's Charles A. Nichols, Late a Representative

Member of the U.S. House of Representatives from Michigan's 13th district
- In office March 4, 1915 – April 25, 1920
- Preceded by: Patrick H. Kelley
- Succeeded by: Clarence J. McLeod

Personal details
- Born: Charles Archibald Nichols; August 25, 1876 Boyne City, Michigan, U.S.
- Died: April 25, 1920 (aged 43) Washington, D.C., U.S.
- Resting place: Grand Lawn Cemetery in Detroit, Michigan
- Party: Republican

Charles Archibald Nichols (August 25, 1876 – April 25, 1920) was an American journalist and politician from the U.S. state of Michigan who served three terms in the U.S. House of Representatives from 1915 to 1920.

== Early life and education ==
Nichols was born to Mr. and Mrs. Thomas Whitney Nichols in Boyne City, Michigan, and attended the public schools. He engaged in newspaper work as reporter and criminal investigator for the Detroit Journal and the Detroit News from 1898 to 1905.

=== Early political career ===
He served as secretary of the police department of the city of Detroit from 1905 to 1908 and as city clerk from 1908 to 1912.

== United States House of Representatives ==
In 1914, Nichols was elected as a Republican from the newly created 13th congressional district of Michigan to the 64th United States Congress. He was twice re-elected to the 65th and 66th Congresses, serving from March 4, 1915, until his death in 1920. He was chairman of the Committee on the Census in the 66th Congress.

== Death ==
Charles A. Nichols died in office, in Washington, D.C., and is interred in Grand Lawn Cemetery, Detroit, Michigan. Clarence McLeod was elected to fill the vacant seat.

== See also ==
- List of members of the United States Congress who died in office (1900–1949)

U.S. House of Representatives
Preceded by Patrick H. Kelley	United States representative for the 13th congressional district of Michigan; 1915 – 1920	Succeeded by Clarence McLeod
