= Michigan's 13th congressional district =

U.S. House district for Michigan

Coordinates: 42°22′49″N 83°18′45″W

- Interactive map of district boundaries since January 3, 2023
- Representative: Shri Thanedar; D–Detroit
- Distribution: 100.00% urban; 0.00% rural
- Population (2025): 790,876
- Median household income: $52,900
- Ethnicity: 45.3% Black; 36.8% White; 10.3% Hispanic; 4.0% Two or more races; 2.9% Asian; 0.7% other
- Cook PVI: D+22

Michigan's 13th congressional district is a United States congressional district in Wayne County, Michigan. It is currently represented by Democrat Shri Thanedar.

The district includes portions of Detroit and some of its suburbs, and from 2013–2023, was the only congressional district in Michigan to be contained within a single county. District boundaries were redrawn in 1993, 2003, 2013, and 2023 due to reapportionment following each respective census.

Before 1992, the 13th congressional district was a Detroit-based district represented by Barbara-Rose Collins. Besides Downtown Detroit, the southwest portion of the city, Mid-town, areas south of Highland Park, and the southern East Side, the district also included Grosse Pointe Park and Grosse Pointe City. During the 1980s, the 13th congressional district lost the most population out of any district in Michigan. However, due to the common interpretation of the Voting Rights Act, which mandates multiple districts in areas with racial majority-minority populations, it was not eliminated in the 1992 redistricting, only renumbered as the 15th district.

A special election was held on November 6, 2018, following the resignation of Representative John Conyers. Brenda Jones won the special election to fill the remainder of Conyers term in the 115th Congress. Democrat Rashida Tlaib won the regular election for the term in the 116th Congress. Tlaib was redrawn into the 12th district after the 2020 redistricting cycle. With a Cook Partisan Voting Index rating of D+22, it is the most Democratic district in Michigan.

== Composition ==
For the 118th and successive Congresses (based on redistricting following the 2020 census), the district contains all or portions of the following counties and municipalities:

Wayne County (20)

Allen Park, Dearborn Heights (part; also 12th), Detroit (part; also 12th), Ecorse, Grosse Pointe, Grosse Pointe Farms, Grosse Pointe Park, Grosse Pointe Woods, Hamtramck, Harper Woods, Highland Park, Lincoln Park, Melvindale, River Rouge, Romulus, Southgate, Taylor, Village of Grosse Pointe Shores (part; also 10th; shared with Macomb County), Wayne, Wyandotte

== History ==
=== 2002 redistricting ===
Following the 2000 census, the congressional apportionment for Michigan was reduced by one and redistricting resulted in the land area of the 13th district (as well as several others) changing significantly. Prior to 2002, the 13th district encompassed a large portion of western Wayne County and part of eastern Washtenaw County. Following redistricting, the new 13th district incorporated most of what had formerly been the 15th district, as well as a large portion of the 14th district and part of the 16th district.

Before redistricting, the old 15th district included Lincoln Park, Ecorse, River Rouge, Hamtramck, Grosse Pointe Park, Grosse Pointe Shores, and Grosse Pointe Farms. It also included all Detroit south and east of a line beginning at the point where Greenfield Road intersects the Dearborn border, heading north along Greenfield until it reached Lyndon Avenue. At Lyndon the line headed east to Livernois, although there was a small area on the south side of Lyndon just east of Schaefer Avenue that was in the 14th district. The boundary line then went about a block south on Livernois until it reached Doris Avenue. It followed Doris to Linwood Avenue (not to be confused with Lyndon Avenue) where it went not even a normal block's length south to go on Oakman Blvd. until it reached the Highland Park City line. The boundary ran along the west and south sides of Highland Park until the point where Highland Park meets Hamtramck. From that point, the boundary ran along the western and northern boundary of Hamtramck and then the eastern boundary of Hamtramck, until the point where the boundary intersected Brockton, which was then followed in a north-easterly direction until the intersection of Brockton and Mt. Elliott. At Mt. Elliott the boundary turned south until intersected Georgia Avenue, and then proceeded east along Georgia Avenue. Where the boundary intersected Van Dyke Avenue it turned north until it intersected Ginnell Avenue, where it again turned east. The boundary followed Grinnell Avenue until it intersected Harding Avenue, where it turned southeast for a block to where it intersected Gratiot and then turned to go Northeast.

The boundary followed Gratiot until it intersected Houston Whittier St, at which point it again turned east, following Houston Whittier until intersecting Kelly Road. The boundary then followed Kelly Road in a northeasterly direction until the intersection of Grayton Road, which went east by southeast. It followed Grayton until intersecting I-94 which it essentially followed north-eastward until it intersected the Grosse Pointe line.

The simple differences between the old 15th and the new 13th districts are that the new 13th includes Grosse Pointe Shores, Grosse Pointe Woods and Harper Woods as well as Wyandotte, and no longer includes Hamtramck. The change in its part of Detroit is harder to explain, but it now touches 8 Mile Road. The portion of the district north of Tireman and west of Livernois has been moved to the 14th district. East of Livernois the boundary has been moved about 12 blocks south to about Courtland Street. It generally follows this line until intersecting with the Highland Park border. Highland Park remains in the 14th district. Hamtramck's western border where it touches Detroit and then its southern border forms the district line. This is then true of Hamtramck's eastern border, and then its northern border until this intersects Conant. Where the northern border of Hamtramck goes east of Conant, Conant becomes the western border of the 13th district. The boundary then follows Conant in a northeastward direction until it intersects Dequindre which it follows to Eight Mile. Thus the area north of the old district line east of Conant was all transferred from the 14th district to the 13th district.

The district's area had a population that was 60.8% African American in 2000, which was down from 69.9% African American in the old 15th district in 2000. The area of the 15th district had been 70% African-American in 1990. These figures are not 100% comparable since the 1990 census did not allow marking more than one race while the 2000 census did.

== Recent election results from statewide races ==
Year	Office	Results
2008	President	Obama 81–17%
2012	President	Obama 82–18%
2014	Senate	Peters 79–18%
2014	Governor	Schauer 72–27%
2014	Secretary of State	Dillard 71–27%
2014	Attorney General	Totten 72–25%
2016	President	Clinton 74–23%
2018	Senate	Stabenow 75–23%
2018	Governor	Whitmer 76–21%
2018	Attorney General	Nessel 74–22%
2020	President	Biden 74–25%
2020	Senate	Peters 73–24%
2022	Governor	Whitmer 77–22%
2022	Secretary of State	Benson 77–21%
2022	Attorney General	Nessel 75–22%
2024	President	Harris 69–28%
2024	Senate	Slotkin 70–27%

== List of members representing the district ==
Representative	Party	Years	Cong ress	Electoral history	District map
District created March 4, 1915
Charles A. Nichols (Detroit)	Republican	March 4, 1915 – April 25, 1920	64th 65th 66th	Elected in 1914. Re-elected in 1916. Re-elected in 1918. Died.	[data missing]
Vacant		April 25, 1920 – November 2, 1920	66th		
Clarence J. McLeod (Detroit)	Republican	November 2, 1920 – March 3, 1921	66th	Elected to finish Nichols's term. Retired.	[data missing]
Vincent M. Brennan (Detroit)	Republican	March 4, 1921 – March 3, 1923	67th	Elected in 1920. Retired.	[data missing]
Clarence J. McLeod (Detroit)	Republican	March 4, 1923 – January 3, 1937	68th 69th 70th 71st 72nd 73rd 74th	Elected in 1922. Re-elected in 1924. Re-elected in 1926. Re-elected in 1928. Re-elected in 1930. Re-elected in 1932. Re-elected in 1934. Lost re-election.	[data missing]
George D. O'Brien (Detroit)	Democratic	January 3, 1937 – January 3, 1939	75th	Elected in 1936. Lost re-election.	[data missing]
Clarence J. McLeod (Detroit)	Republican	January 3, 1939 – January 3, 1941	76th	Elected in 1938. Lost re-election.	[data missing]
George D. O'Brien (Detroit)	Democratic	January 3, 1941 – January 3, 1947	77th 78th 79th	Elected in 1940. Re-elected in 1942. Re-elected in 1944. Lost re-election.	[data missing]
Howard A. Coffin (Detroit)	Republican	January 3, 1947 – January 3, 1949	80th	Elected in 1946. Lost re-election.	[data missing]
George D. O'Brien (Detroit)	Democratic	January 3, 1949 – January 3, 1955	81st 82nd 83rd	Elected in 1948. Re-elected in 1950. Re-elected in 1952. Lost renomination.	[data missing]
Charles Diggs (Detroit)	Democratic	January 3, 1955 – June 3, 1980	84th 85th 86th 87th 88th 89th 90th 91st 92nd 93rd 94th 95th 96th	Elected in 1954. Re-elected in 1950. Re-elected in 1952. Re-elected in 1954. Re-elected in 1956. Re-elected in 1958. Re-elected in 1960. Re-elected in 1962. Re-elected in 1964. Re-elected in 1966. Re-elected in 1968. Re-elected in 1970. Re-elected in 1972. Re-elected in 1974. Re-elected in 1976. Re-elected in 1978. Resigned due to fraud convictions.	[data missing]
Vacant		June 3, 1980 – November 4, 1980	96th		
George Crockett Jr. (Detroit)	Democratic	November 4, 1980 – January 3, 1991	96th 97th 98th 99th 100th 101st	Elected to finish Diggs's term. Elected to full term in 1980. Re-elected in 1982. Re-elected in 1984. Re-elected in 1986. Re-elected in 1988. Retired.	[data missing]
Barbara-Rose Collins (Detroit)	Democratic	January 3, 1991 – January 3, 1993	102nd	Elected in 1990. Redistricted to the 15th district.	[data missing]
William D. Ford (Ypsilanti)	Democratic	January 3, 1993 – January 3, 1995	103rd	Redistricted from the 15th district and re-elected in 1992. Retired.	1993–2003:
Lynn N. Rivers (Ann Arbor)	Democratic	January 3, 1995 – January 3, 2003	104th 105th 106th 107th	Elected in 1994. Re-elected in 1996. Re-elected in 1998. Re-elected in 2000. Redistricted to the 15th district and lost renomination.	1993–2003:
Carolyn Cheeks Kilpatrick (Detroit)	Democratic	January 3, 2003 – January 3, 2011	108th 109th 110th 111th	Redistricted from the 15th district and re-elected in 2002. Re-elected in 2004. Re-elected in 2006. Re-elected in 2008. Lost renomination.	2003–2013:
Hansen Clarke (Detroit)	Democratic	January 3, 2011 – January 3, 2013	112th	Elected in 2010. Redistricted to the 14th district and lost renomination.	2003–2013:
John Conyers (Detroit)	Democratic	January 3, 2013 – December 5, 2017	113th 114th 115th	Redistricted from the 14th district and re-elected in 2012. Re-elected in 2014. Re-elected in 2016. Resigned following sexual harassment allegations.	2013–2023:
Vacant		December 5, 2017 – November 29, 2018	115th		2013–2023:
Brenda Jones (Detroit)	Democratic	November 29, 2018 – January 3, 2019	115th	Elected to finish Conyers's term. Lost nomination to a full term.	2013–2023:
Rashida Tlaib (Detroit)	Democratic	January 3, 2019 – January 3, 2023	116th 117th	Elected in 2018. Re-elected in 2020. Redistricted to the 12th district.	2013–2023:
Shri Thanedar (Detroit)	Democratic	January 3, 2023 – present	118th 119th	Elected in 2022. Re-elected in 2024. Lost renomination.	2023–present:
Donavan McKinney (Detroit)	Democratic	Assuming office on January 3, 2027		Elected in 2026.	2023–present:

== Recent election results ==
=== 2012 ===
2012 Michigan's 13th congressional district election
Party	Candidate	Votes	%
Democratic	John Conyers (incumbent)	235,336	82.8
Republican	Harry T. Sawicki	38,769	13.6
Libertarian	Chris Sharer	6,076	2.1
U.S. Taxpayers'	Martin Gray	4,089	1.5
Total votes		284,270	100.0
Democratic hold			

=== 2014 ===
2014 Michigan's 13th congressional district election
Party	Candidate	Votes	%
Democratic	John Conyers (incumbent)	132,710	79.5
Republican	Jeff Gorman	27,234	16.3
Libertarian	Chis Sharer	3,537	2.1
Independent	Sam Johnson	3,466	2.1
Total votes		166,947	100.0
Democratic hold			

=== 2016 ===
2016 Michigan's 13th congressional district election
Party	Candidate	Votes	%
Democratic	John Conyers (incumbent)	198,771	77.1
Republican	Jeff Gorman	40,541	15.7
Libertarian	Tiffany Hayden	9,648	3.8
Working Class	Sam Johnson	8,835	3.4
Independent	Clyde Darnell Lynch (write-in)	2	0.0
Total votes		257,797	100.0
Democratic hold			

=== 2018 special election ===
2018 Michigan's 13th congressional district special election
Party	Candidate	Votes	%	±%
Democratic	Brenda Jones	169,330	86.84%	+9.74%
U.S. Taxpayers'	Marc Sosnowski	17,302	8.87%	N/A
Green	D. Etta Wilcoxon	8,319	4.27%	N/A
Write-in		42	0.02%	N/A
Total votes		194,993	100.00%	N/A
Democratic hold				

=== 2018 ===
2018 Michigan's 13th congressional district election
Party	Candidate	Votes	%
Democratic	Rashida Tlaib	165,355	84.2
Working Class	Sam Johnson	22,186	11.3
Green	D. Etta Wilcoxon	7,980	4.1
Independent	Brenda Jones (write-in)	633	0.3
n/a	Other write-ins	145	0.1
Total votes		196,299	100.0
Democratic hold			

=== 2020 ===
2020 Michigan's 13th congressional district election
Party	Candidate	Votes	%
Democratic	Rashida Tlaib (incumbent)	223,205	78.1
Republican	David Dudenhoefer	53,311	18.7
Working Class	Sam Johnson	5,284	1.8
Green	D. Etta Wilcoxon	2,105	0.7
U.S. Taxpayers'	Articia Bomer	1,974	0.7
Independent	Donald Eason (write-in)	6	0.0
Total votes		285,885	100.0
Democratic hold			

=== 2022 ===
2022 Michigan's 13th congressional district election
Party	Candidate	Votes	%
Democratic	Shri Thanedar	166,650	71.0
Republican	Martell Bivings	56,187	23.9
Working Class	Simone Coleman	8,833	3.7
U.S. Taxpayers'	Chris Dardzinski	2,769	1.1
Write-in		5	0.0
Total votes		234,444	100.0
Democratic hold			

=== 2024 ===
2024 Michigan's 13th congressional district election
Party	Candidate	Votes	%
Democratic	Shri Thanedar (incumbent)	220,788	68.6
Republican	Martell Bivings	78,917	24.5
Working Class	Simone Coleman	13,367	4.2
Libertarian	Chris Clark	5,726	1.8
U.S. Taxpayers'	Chris Dardzinski	2,825	0.9
Write-in		26	0.0
Total votes		321,649	100.0
Democratic hold			

== See also ==
- Michigan's congressional districts
- List of United States congressional districts
