= Recycle Here! =

Recycling center in Detroit, Michigan

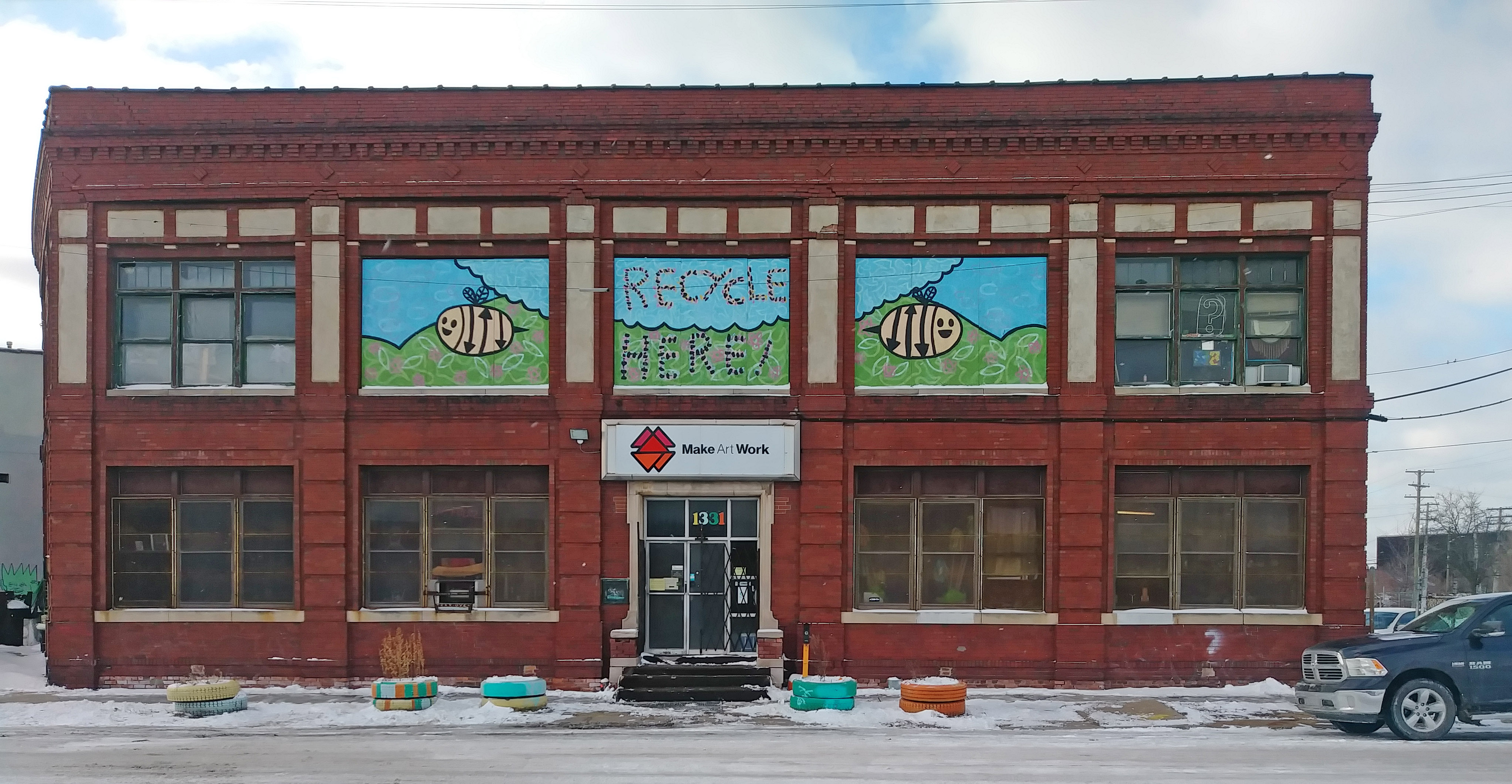
- Founded: 2007
- Type: Recycling Center
- Location: Lincoln Street Art Park
- Region served: Detroit, Michigan
- Website: Recycle Here! Drop-off Facility, Detroit Department of Public Works

Recycle Here! is a recycling center and drop-off facility in New Center, Detroit that opened in 2007. The recycling center is located in the Warren Motor Car Company Building, now the Dreamtroit complex. The building was once a Lincoln Motor Car Company factory, and was listed on the National Register of Historic Places in 2020. The Lincoln Street Art Park is an adjacent sculpture garden of site-specific installations made from materials salvaged at Recycle Here!

Recycle Here! recycles paper, plastic, cardboard, glass, metal, books, styrofoam, shredded paper, as well as household hazardous waste.

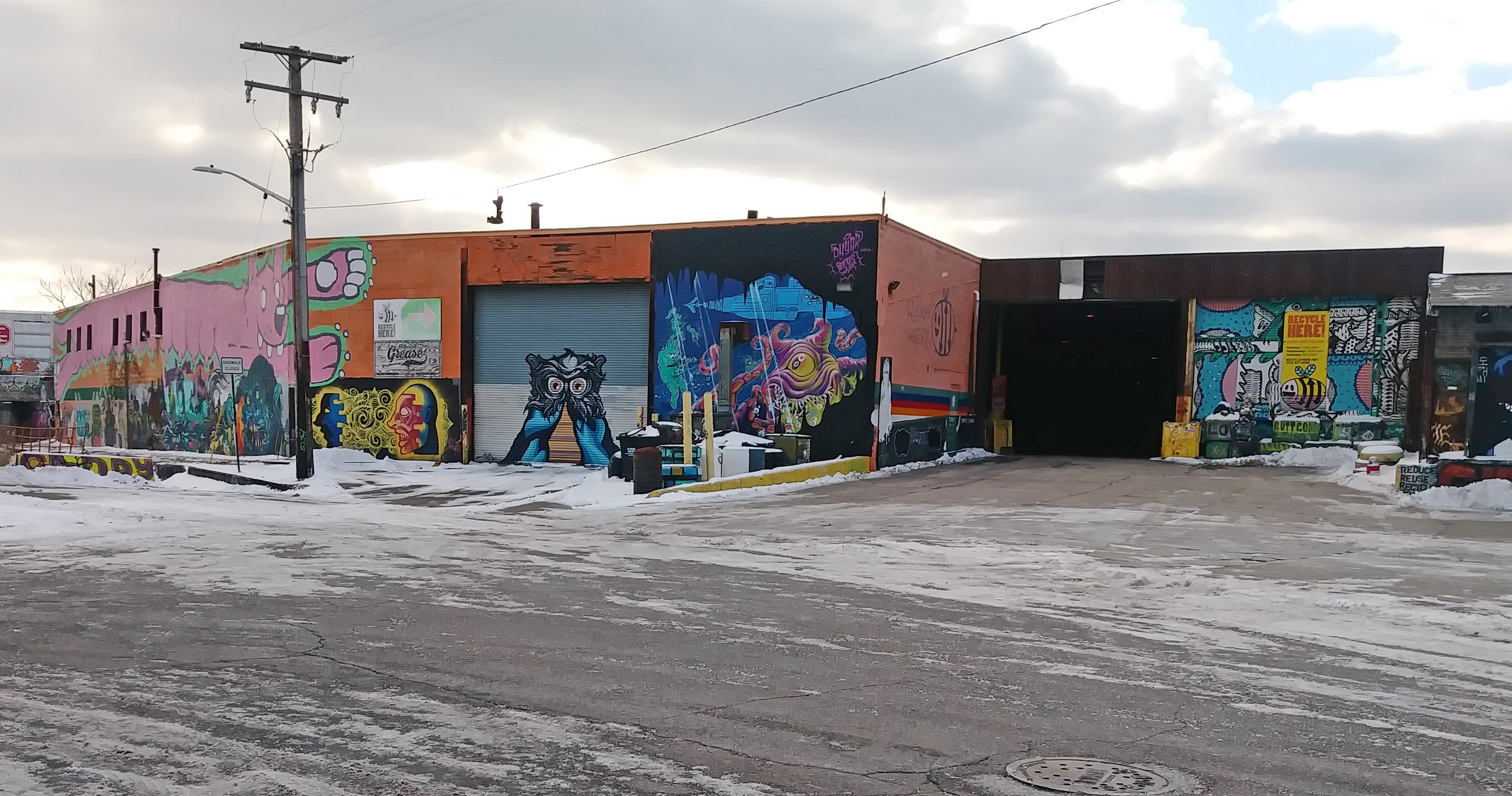
Warren Motor Car Company Building E

== History ==
Recycle Here! was conceived of by co-founder Matthew Naimi in 2007, when he was working for the City of Detroit Public Works in curbside refuse collection and noticed a lack of recycling options for residents.

In 2007, Recycle Here! was started through a partnership with the City of Detroit through the Greater Detroit Resource Recovery Authority (GDRRA) and the Department of Public Works.

Recycle Here! has assisted with the creation of recycling programs in the Detroit Public Schools and the coordinated roll-out of curbside recycling and recycling education programs, with the Detroit GDRRA and DPW. The recycling center has also hosted cultural programs, such as musical performances, maker competitions, and comedy shows. The space is also known for having street art in and outside the building, and the surrounding Lincoln Street Art Park. A mural of a bee by artist Carl Oxley III on the Warren Motor Car Company Building is the official logo of Recycle Here!

In 2010, the Green Living Science 501c3 was created by the staff at Recycle Here! to extend the work of Recycle Here! into educational outreach in the Detroit Public Schools.

Recycle Here! occupies a space in the Dreamtroit complex, a mixed-use affordable living complex that started building adjacent to the Lincoln Street Art Park. The development involves building a new structure within the Warren Motor Car Company Building.

== See also ==
- Lincoln Street Art Park
- Warren Motor Car Company Building
