= Warren Motor Car Company Building =

- U.S. National Register of Historic Places
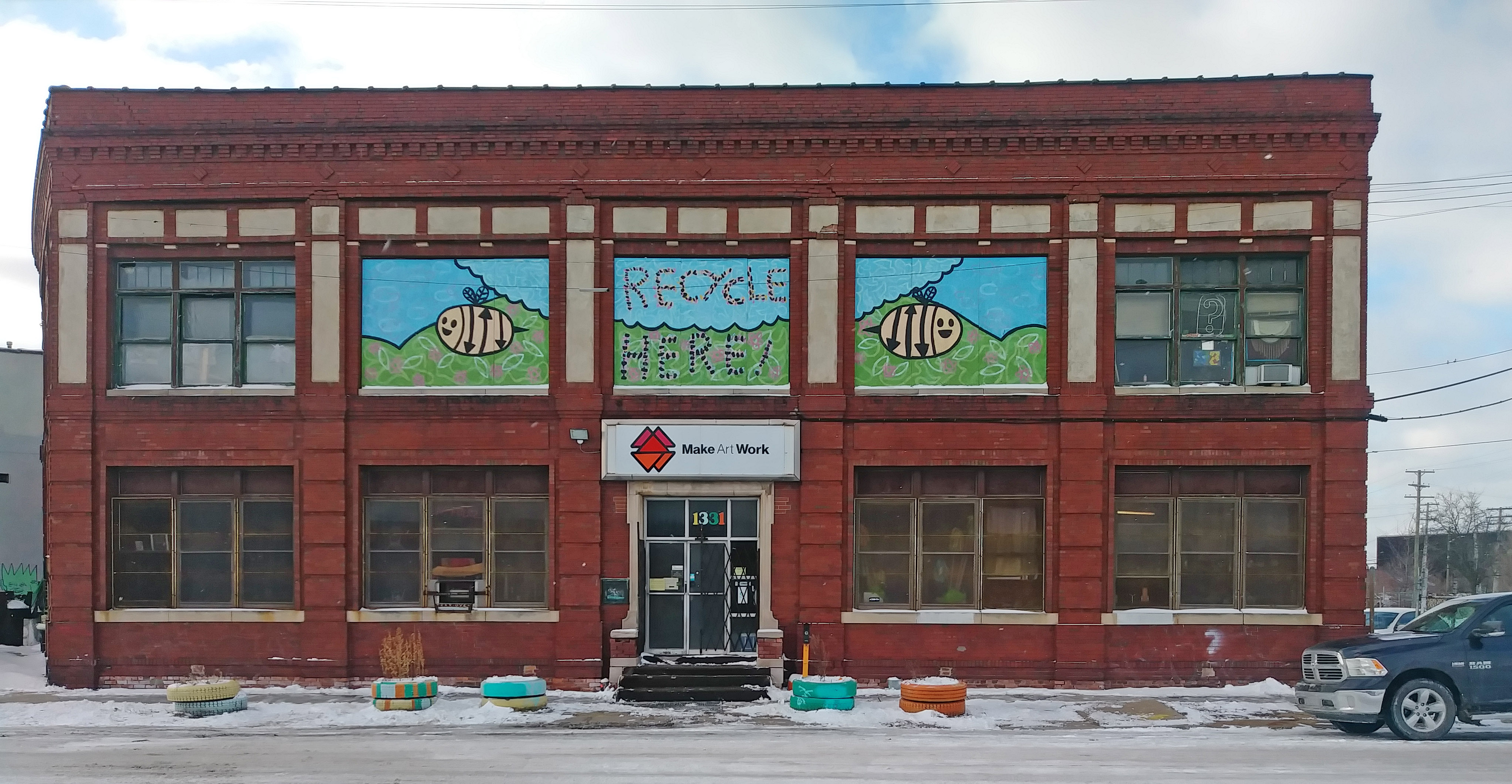
- Office Building, 2020
- Interactive map
- Location: 1331 Holden St. Detroit, Michigan
- Coordinates: 42°21′46″N 83°4′59″W
- Built: 1910
- Architect: Rogers and MacFarlane
- Architectural style: Commercial style
- NRHP reference No.: 100005108
- Added to NRHP: March 20, 2020

The Warren Motor Car Company Building, also known as Lincoln Motor Car Company Building, is a factory located at 1331 Holden Street in Detroit, Michigan, now part of the Lincoln Street Art Park. It was listed on the National Register of Historic Places in 2020.

== History ==
=== Warren Motor Car Company ===
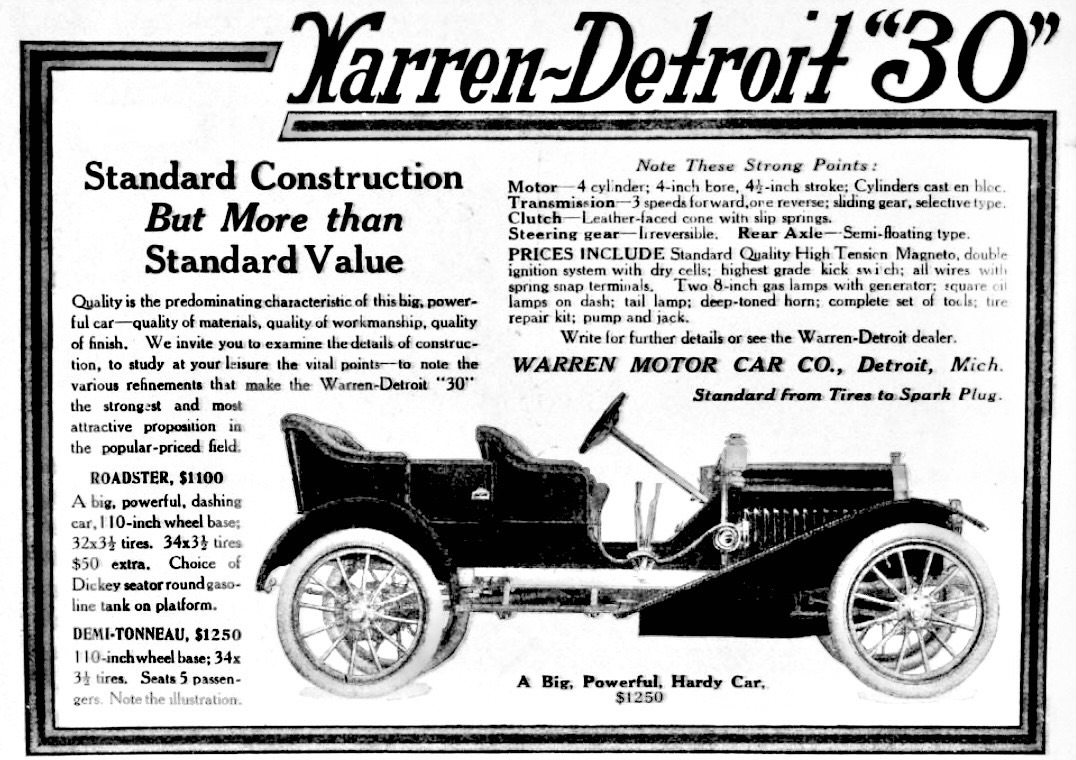
Warren-Detroit 30 (1910)

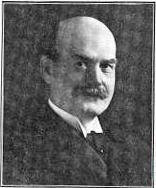
Homer Warren

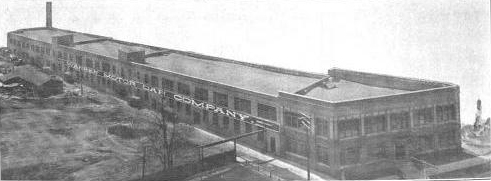
Building in 1913 with office (right) and factory buildings 2, 3, and 4

In the first decade of the 20th century, Detroit was booming with new industry, in particular new automotive companies. One of these was the Warren Motor Car Company, founded in 1909 by real estate magnate Homer Warren. The company occupied a building along Michigan Avenue on the west side of Detroit, and produced 1000 vehicles in its first year. In 1910, Warren purchased this plot of land on Holden from the Detroit Column & Manufacturing Company. Detroit Column had already constructed a partially completed (but never utilized) structure on the site. Warren hired the Detroit architectural firm of Rogers and MacFarlane to design a series of building to fill the site. These buildings were constructed and occupied in 1910.

=== The 1910s ===
The Warren Motor Car Company had some early success, but never capitalized on it. They changed vehicle lineups every year, and their relatively expensive vehicles saw declining sales. Warren was reorganized in 1912, and by 1913 the company was bankrupt. The Holden factory was sold at auction to William C. Rands of Rands Manufacturing Company, an automotive supplier. In 1916 Rands merged with four other companies to form the Motor Products company. Needing more space, Motor Products cut a deal with the financially troubled Lozier Motor Company to swap factory space, and Motor Products moved into the former Lozier factory on Mack, while Lozier took over the Holden factory.

Lozier lasted less than a year in their new space, and in 1917 Henry M. Leland purchased the property to house his newly formed Lincoln Motor Company. Leland immediately tooled up to build Liberty engines for WWI fighter planes at the plant and constructed an additional building at the site. However, The Holden property quickly proved too small, and by early 1918 most of the production was moved to the completely new Lincoln Motor Company Plant, leaving a small machining operation at the Holden plant.

=== Later history ===
After the end of WWI, Lincoln struggled, and eventually went into receivership in late 1921. Henry Ford purchased the company in 1922. By 1923, the Holden plant had been retrofitted to produce Model Ts. Manufacturing of Model Ts at the Holden plant likely continued through 1927, although the exact date is uncertain. The building was next occupied by Dietrich Inc., and then a series of companies all owned by Dallas E. Winslow, including another automotive company and two refrigerator companies.

Beginning in 1946, the grocery firm of Grosse Pointe Quality Foods was operating out of the Holden plant. This firm remained at the site until at least 1977. Another grocery firm, Metro Groceries, Inc., used the facility in the 1980s. In 1997, Matt Naimi purchased the building from his family. In 2007, Naimi started Recycle Here, a recycling center and events space. The building grounds also host the Lincoln Street Art Park. In 2020, work in the building started on Dreamtroit, a $20-million development. The plan is to turn the building into a mixed-use housing development.

=== The Freezer ===
In more recent years The "Freezer" — a courtyard at the Lincoln Factory has become a notable location for concerts, art events, and pickup sports including street soccer and [[[bike polo]].

== Description ==
The Warren Motor Car Company Building occupies a triangular site encompassing 4.67 acres, and bounded by Holden Street, Lincoln Street, and the Grand Trunk Western Railroad tracks. The building developed as a series of additions in an array of contrasting building materials and architectural styles. Five of the sections making up the building are historically significant: the office building, the original factory, and three of the factory additions. These buildings were all constructed in the 1910 - 1917 time frame. Six additional smaller additions are also on the site, all constructed in the 1950s - 1970s for the grocery warehouse firms that used the building.

The earlier buildings are typically of heavy timber and load bearing masonry construction, save a 1917 building which is constructed of cast-in-place reinforced concrete. The later additions are steel-framed, sitting on reinforced concrete slabs with non-load-bearing masonry exterior walls.

=== Office Building ===
The office building, designed by Rogers and MacFarlane, was constructed in 1910. It is a two-story Commercial style building constructed with a timber frame and load-bearing wall of dark red brick and cast stone accents. The front façade is five bays wide, with a main entry in the center in the middle bay. The entry is flanked by two windows on each side, with red brick piers separating the bays. Within the piers, raised brick rectangles designed to resemble quoins are laid between the windows. The window openings have a cast stone sill. A stepped brick cornice is between the first and second floors, and the second floor is divided into five bays of windows corresponding to the bays below.

Each window bay contains three double-hung windows with a horizontal transom above. On the second floor, recessed cast stone panels are set in the piers between the windows, as well as above. A brick parapet wall capped with brown terra cotta coping is above the second floor. A cornice and a brick frieze containing a diamond-shaped raised brick decorative designs are above.

=== Building 2 (Factory) ===
Building 2 is the first manufacturing plant, and was also designed by Rogers and MacFarlane and constructed in about 1910. The building is a two-story structure, rectangular in shape, measuring about 159 feet by 60 feet. It has a flat roof. It has a timber-frame construction and brick load-bearing walls. It adjoins the office building on one end, and Building 3 on the other.

The window arrangement is different on each story. The window openings on the first story are intended to single double-hung windows. The openings on the second story are larger, and are intended to house multi-paned steel factory windows. The second-sory opening have cast stone sills.

=== Building 3 (Factory) ===
Building 3 is directly connected to Building 2, and is of similar construction and age. It also is a two-story, flat-roofed structure with a timber frame and brick load-bearing walls. It measures about 118 feet by 60 feet. The building has varying sizes of window openings on the first and second floor. The building connects directly to one end of Building 2, with the other end connecting to Building 4.

=== Building 4 (Factory) ===
Building 4 is connected to the end of Building 3, such that The office and Buildings 2, 3, and 4 form a line running north and south. Building 4 was also designed by Rogers and MacFarlane, and was constructed slightly later that the previous buildings, likely in 1911. It is also a two-story flat-roofed structure with a timber frame and brick load-bearing walls, measuring about 215 feet by 67 feet. The side is 12 window bays long, with all window openings being identical. A small windowless single-story trapezoidal addition is placed on the end.

=== Building 5 (Factory) ===
Building 5 is a two-story reinforced concrete structure faced with brick, built in 1917. It is attached to Building 3, and was originally C-shaped, covering an area 153 feet by 87 feet. As of 2020, the building is completely surrounded by later additions, and the center of the "C" has been infilled.

== 2020 Gallery ==
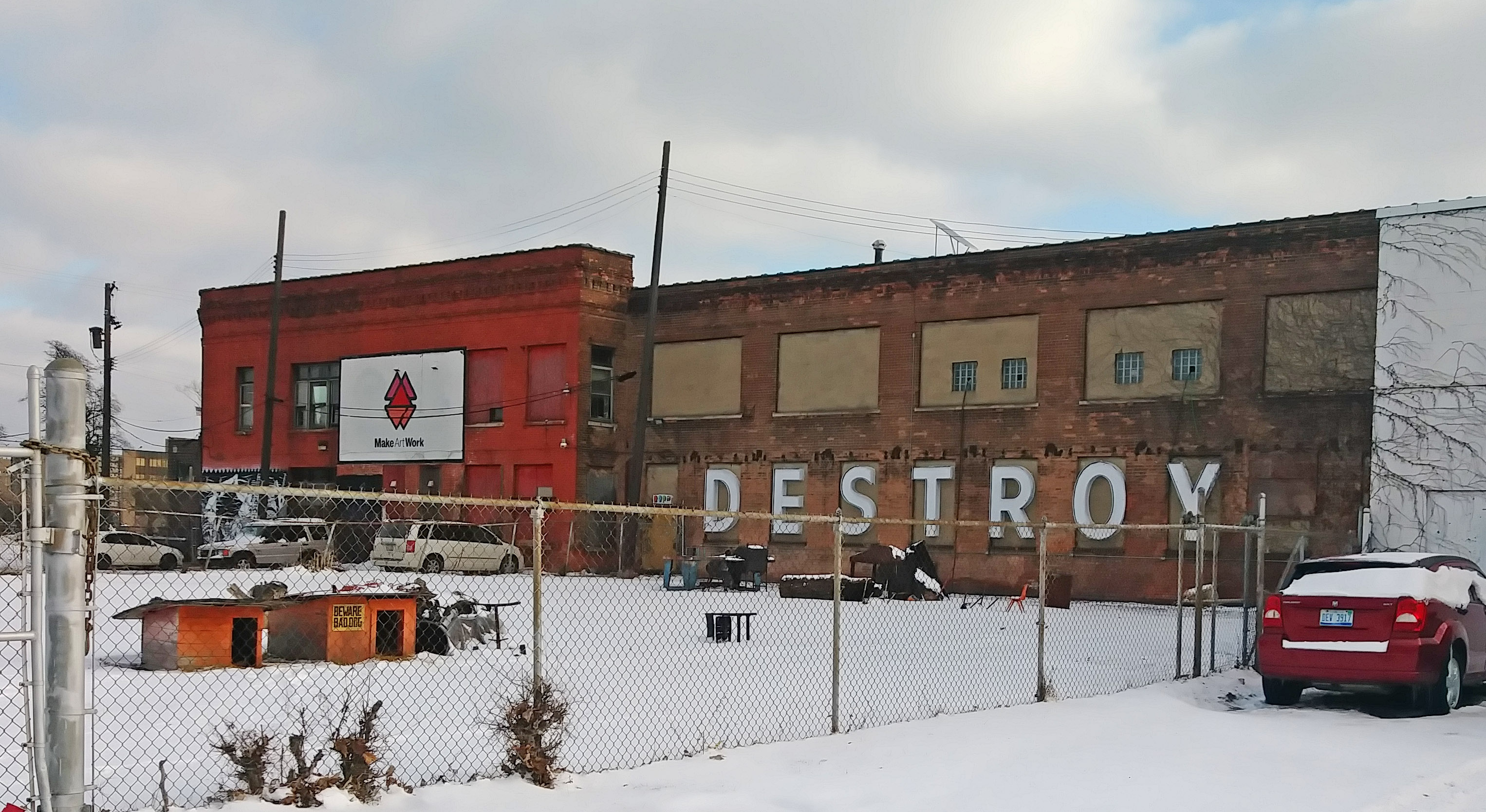
Office (left) and building 2 (factory, now studio space)

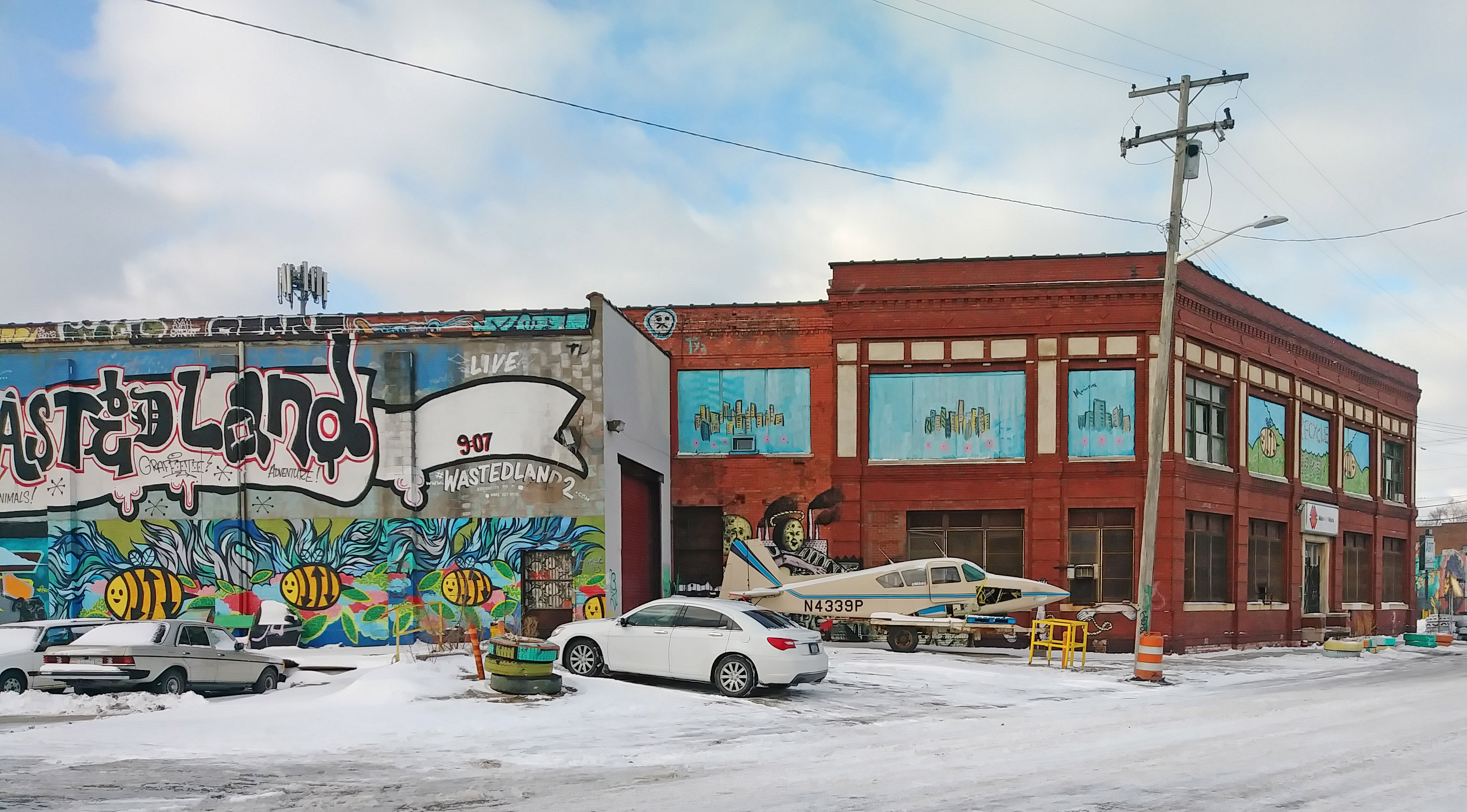
Building 2 (factory) with addition in the foreground, and office (right)

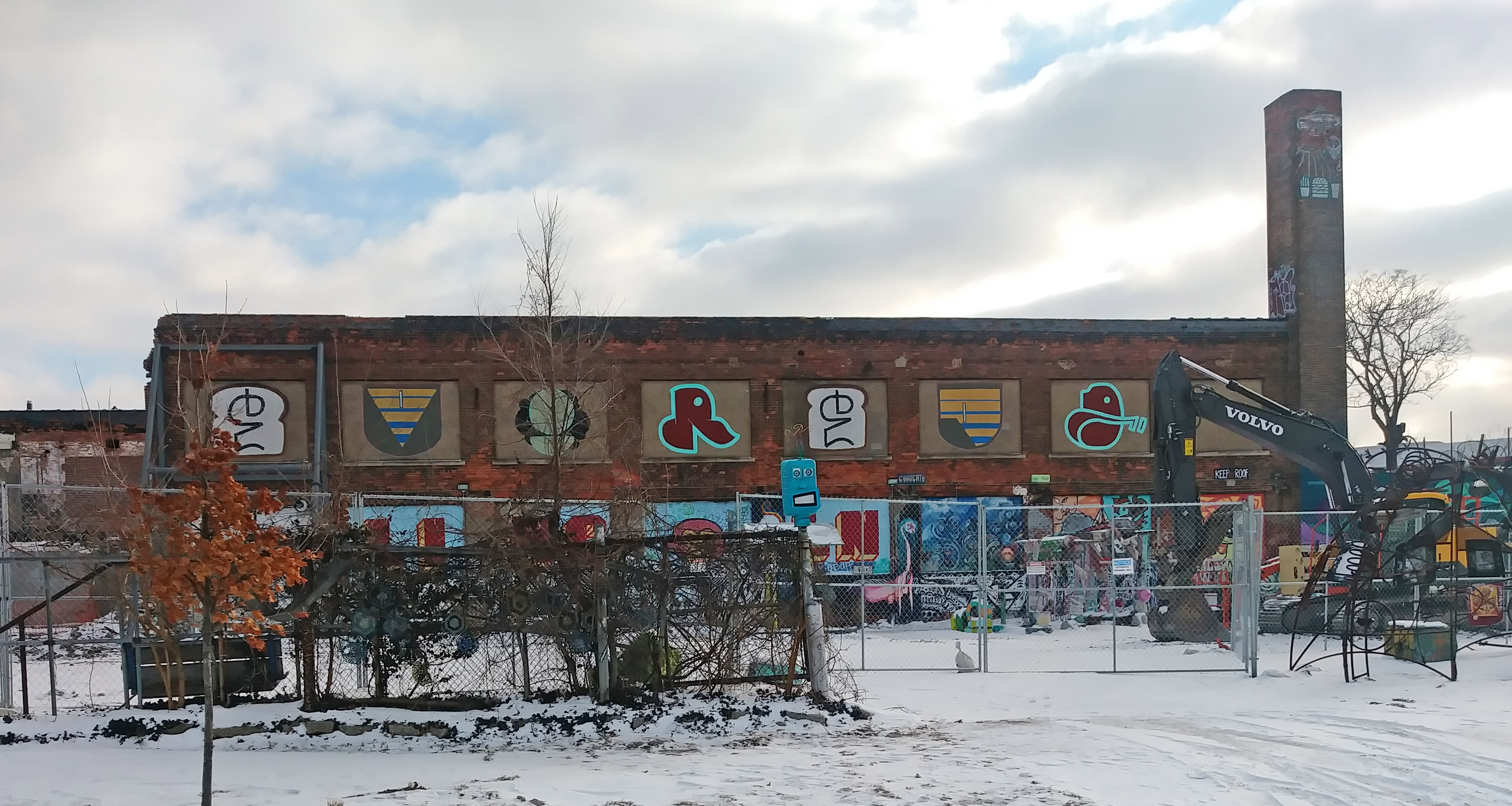
Building 4 (factory) with Lincoln Street Art Park in the foreground

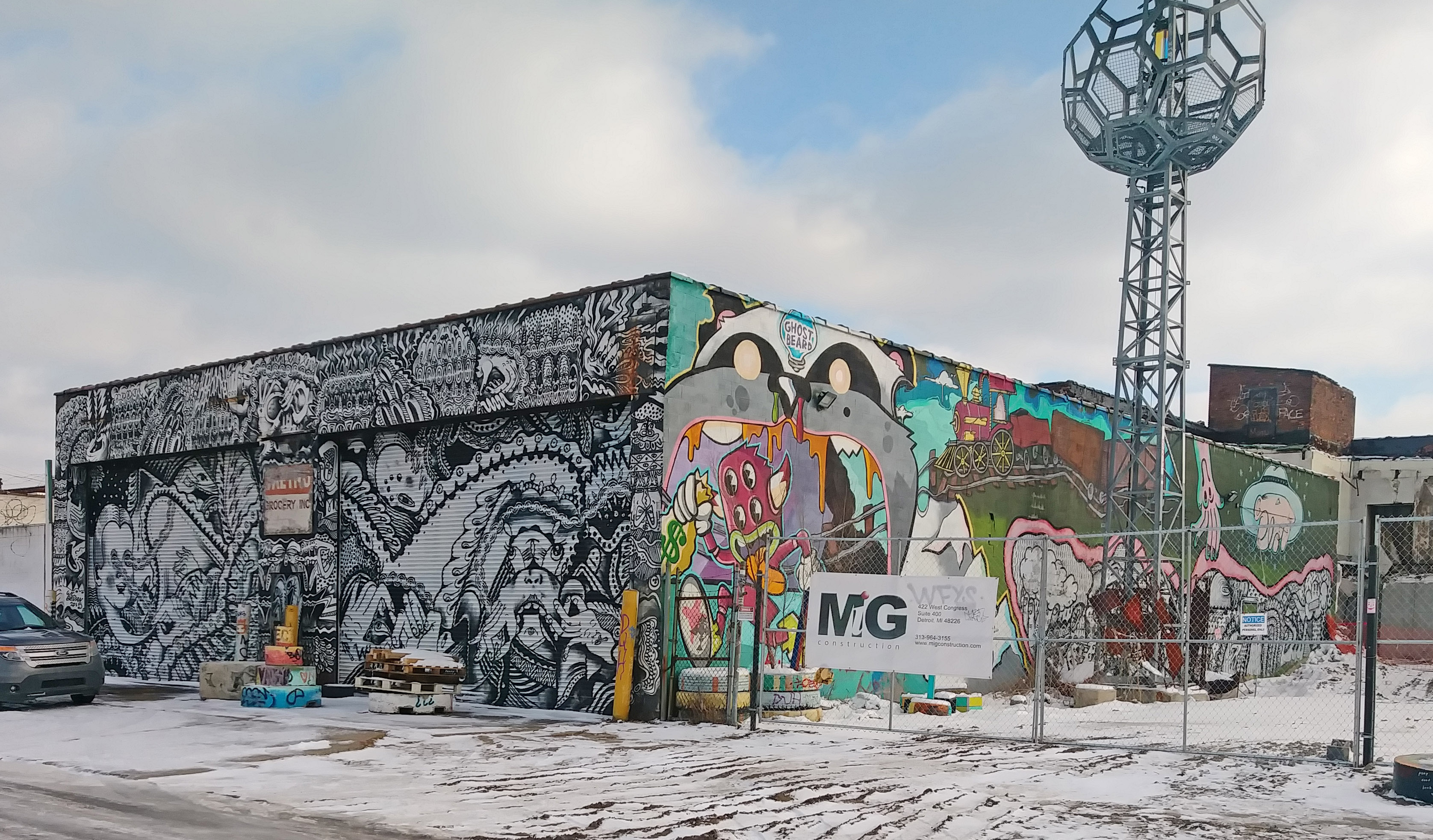
Later addition between buildings 3 and 4

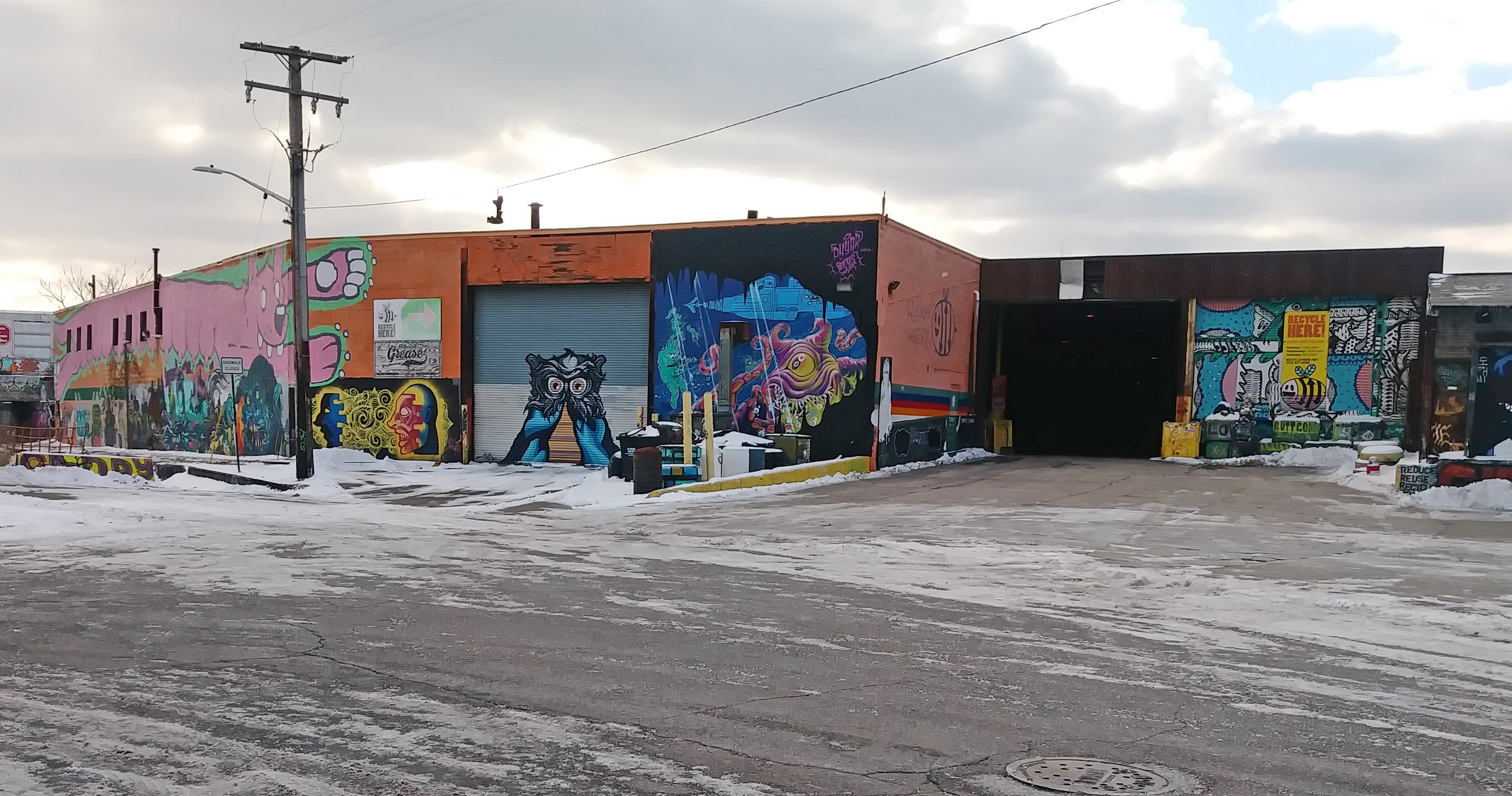
Recycling center (later addition)

== See also ==
- Lincoln Street Art Park
- Recycle Here!
