= 1887 in Michigan =

- Decades: 1860s; 1870s; 1880s; 1890s; 1900s
- See also: History of Michigan; Historical outline of Michigan; List of years in Michigan; 1887 in the United States

Events from the year 1887 in Michigan.

== Office holders ==
=== State office holders ===
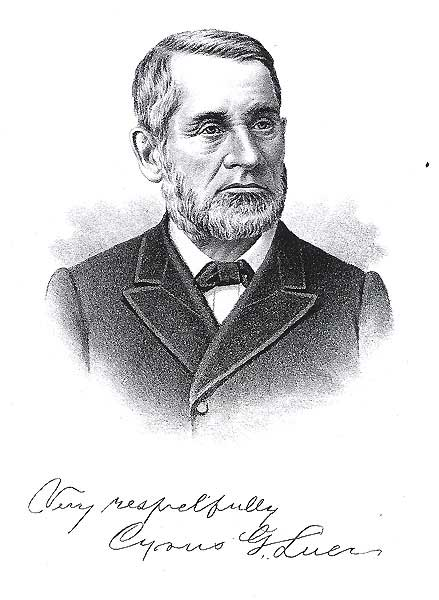
Cyrus G. Luce

- Governor of Michigan: Russell A. Alger (Republican) (until January 1), Cyrus G. Luce (Republican)
- Lieutenant Governor of Michigan: Archibald Buttars (Republican) (until January 1), James H. MacDonald (Republican) (starting January 1)
- Michigan Attorney General: Moses Taggart
- Michigan Secretary of State: Gilbert R. Osmun (Republican)
- State Land Commissioner: Roscoe D. Dix (Republican)
- Speaker of the Michigan House of Representatives: Daniel P. Markey (Republican)
- Chief Justice, Michigan Supreme Court: Thomas R. Sherwood

=== Mayors of major cities ===
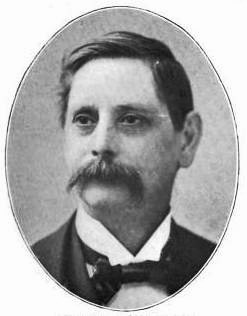
Marvin H. Chamberlain

- Mayor of Detroit: Marvin H. Chamberlain
- Mayor of Flint: Mathew Davison
- Mayor of Grand Rapids: Edmund B. Dikeman
- Mayor of Lansing: Jacob F. Schultz
- Mayor of Saginaw: Henry M. Youmans (Democratic)
- Mayor of Ann Arbor: Willard B. Smith

=== Federal office holders ===
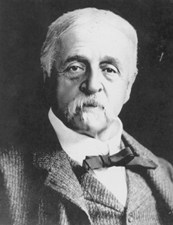
Sen. Palmer

- U.S. Senator from Michigan: Omar D. Conger/Francis B. Stockbridge (both Republican)
- U.S. Senator from Michigan: Thomas W. Palmer (Republican)
- House District 1: William C. Maybury/John Logan Chipman (both Democratic)
- House District 2: Nathaniel B. Eldredge (Democratic)/Edward P. Allen (Republican)
- House District 3: James O'Donnell (Republican)
- House District 4: Julius C. Burrows (Republican)
- House District 5: Charles C. Comstock/Melbourne H. Ford (both Democratic)
- House District 6: Edwin B. Winans (Democratic)/Mark S. Brewer (Republican)
- House District 7: Ezra C. Carleton/Justin Rice Whiting (both Democratic)
- House District 8: Timothy E. Tarsney (Democratic)
- House District 9: Byron M. Cutcheon (Republican)
- House District 10: Spencer O. Fisher (Democratic)
- House District 11: Seth C. Moffatt (Republican)

== Population ==
In the 1880 United States census, Michigan was recorded as having a population of 1,636,937. By 1890, Michigan's population had increased by 27.9% to 2,093,890.

=== Cities ===
The following is a list of cities in Michigan with a population of at least 5,000 based on 1880 U.S. Census data. Historic census data from 1870 and 1890 is included to reflect trends in population increases or decreases.

1880 Rank	City	County	1870 Pop.	1880 Pop.	1890 Pop.	Change 1880-1890
1	Detroit	Wayne	79,577	116,340	205,876	77.0%
2	Grand Rapids	Kent	16,507	32,016	60,278	88.3%
3	Bay City	Bay	7,064	20,693	27,839	34.5%
4	Jackson	Jackson	14,447	16,105	20,798	29.1%
5	Kalamazoo	Kalamazoo	9,181	11,937	17,853	49.6%
6	Muskegon	Muskegon	6,002	11,262	22,702	101.6%
7	Saginaw	Saginaw	7,460	10,525	46,322	340.1%
8	Port Huron	St. Clair	5,973	8,883	13,543	52.5%
9	Flint	Genesee	5,386	8,409	9,803	16.6%
10	Lansing	Ingham	5,241	8,319	13,102	57.5%
11	Ann Arbor	Washtenaw	7,363	8,061	9,431	17.0%
12	Adrian	Lenawee	8,438	7,849	8,756	11.6%
13	Battle Creek	Calhoun	5,838	7,063	13,197	86.8%
14	Manistee	Manistee	3,343	6,930	12,812	84.9%
15	Alpena	Alpena	--	6,153	11,283	83.4%

=== Counties ===
The following is a list of counties in Michigan with populations of at least 30,000 based on 1880 U.S. Census data. Historic census data from 1870 and 1890 are included to reflect trends in population increases or decreases.

1880 Rank	County	Largest city	1870 Pop.	1880 Pop.	1890 Pop.	Change 1880-1890
1	Wayne	Detroit	119,068	168,444	257,114	52.6%
2	Kent	Grand Rapids	50,403	73,253	109,922	50.1%
3	Saginaw	Saginaw	39,097	59,095	82,273	39.2%
4	St. Clair	Port Huron	36,661	46,197	52,105	12.8%
5	Jackson	Jackson	36,047	42,031	45,031	7.1%
6	Washtenaw	Ann Arbor	41,434	41,848	42,210	0.9%
7	Oakland	Pontiac	40,867	41,537	41,245	−0.7%
8	Calhoun	Battle Creek	36,569	38,452	43,501	13.1%
9	Bay	Bay City	15,900	38,081	56,412	48.1%
10	Berrien	Niles	35,104	36,785	41,285	12.2%

== Sports ==
=== Baseball ===
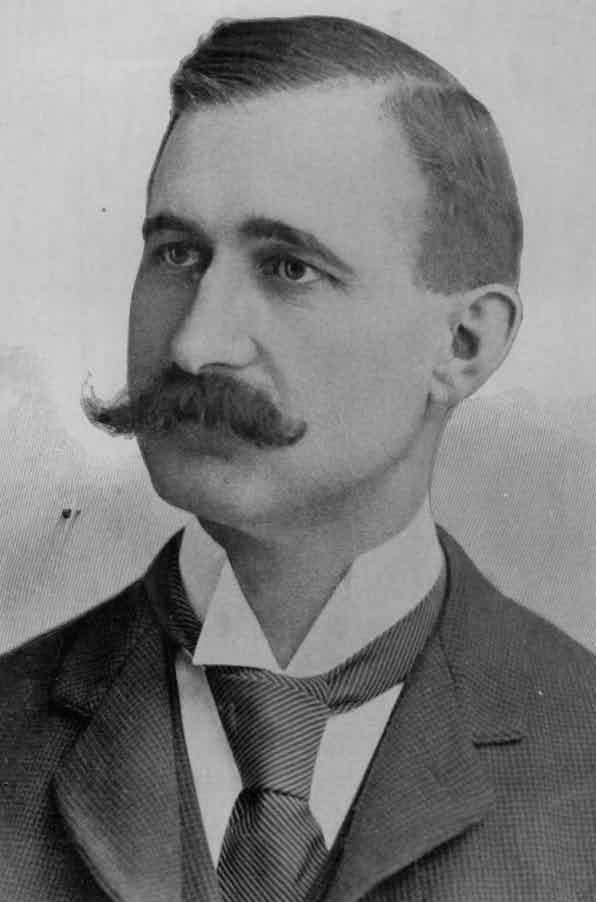
Sam Thompson

- 1887 Detroit Wolverines season – Under manager Bill Watkins, the Wolverines won the 1887 National League pennant, then defeated the St. Louis Browns in the 1887 World Series. It was the first World Series championship for Detroit.the team's statistical leaders included Sam Thompson with a .372 batting average and 166 RBIs, Dan Brouthers with 12 home runs, Ned Hanlon with 69 stolen bases, and Pretzels Getzien with 29 wins. Thompson, Brouthers, and Hanlon have been inducted into the Baseball Hall of Fame.
- 1887 Michigan Wolverines baseball season - The Wolverines compiled a 3–4 record. Lincoln MacMillan was the team captain.

=== American football ===
- 1887 Michigan Wolverines football team – The Wolverines compiled a 5–0 record and outscored their opponents by a total of 102 to 10. The team captain was John L. Duffy.

== Chronology of events ==
=== January ===
- January 18 - The two houses of the Michigan Legislature elected Francis B. Stockbridge to represent Michigan in the United States Senate.

=== April ===
- April 6 - Detroit Athletic Club organized with signing of articles of incorporation by 29 founders.

=== July ===
- July 7 - Michigan Supreme Court decides Sherwood v. Walker

=== December ===
- December 19 - The Detroit Symphony Orchestra performed the first concert of its first subscription season at the Detroit Opera House.

== Births ==
- January 20 - Rebecca Shelley, antiwar activist who attended U-M and lived in Battle Creek, in Pennsylvania
- April 10 - H. G. Salsinger, sports editor of The Detroit News (1909-1958), in Ohio
- May 24 - James K. Watkins, U-M football player and Detroit police commissioner
- June 12 - Pop McKale, coach of football and basketball at Arizona, in Lansing, Michigan
- August 16 - Albert Benbrook, All-American U-M football player, in Texas
- September 15 - Ruth Thompson, represented Michigan in Congress (1951–1957), in Whitehall, Michigan
- September 28 - Avery Brundage, president of the International Olympic Committee (1952-1972), in Detroit
- October 4 - Ray Fisher, U-M baseball coach for 38 years, in Vermont

=== Gallery of 1887 births ===
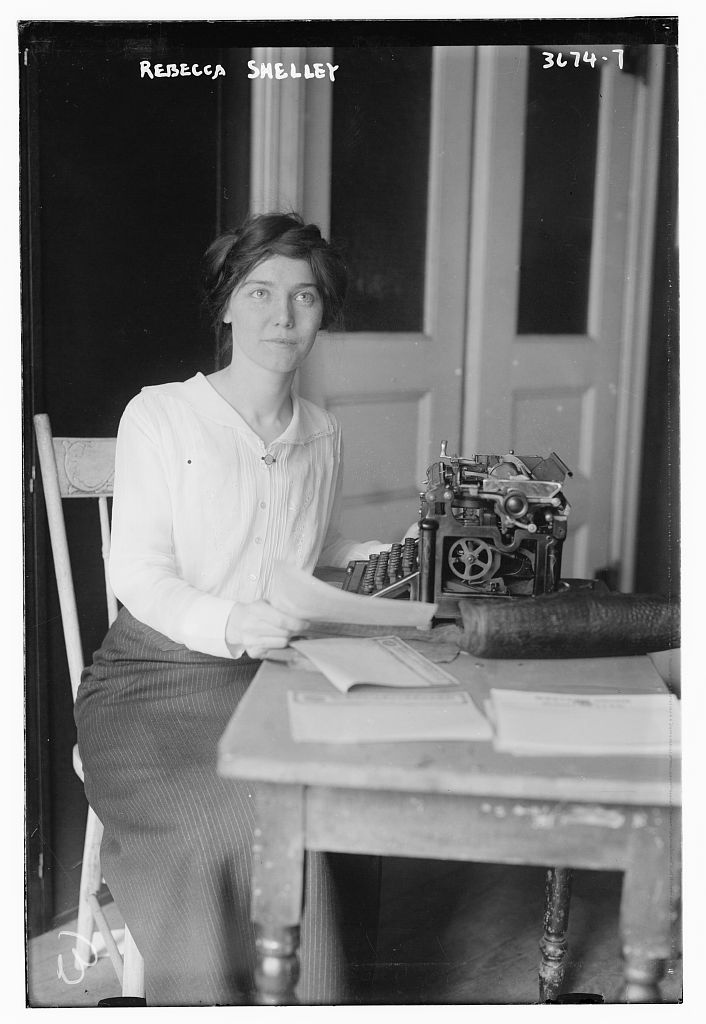
Rebecca Shelley

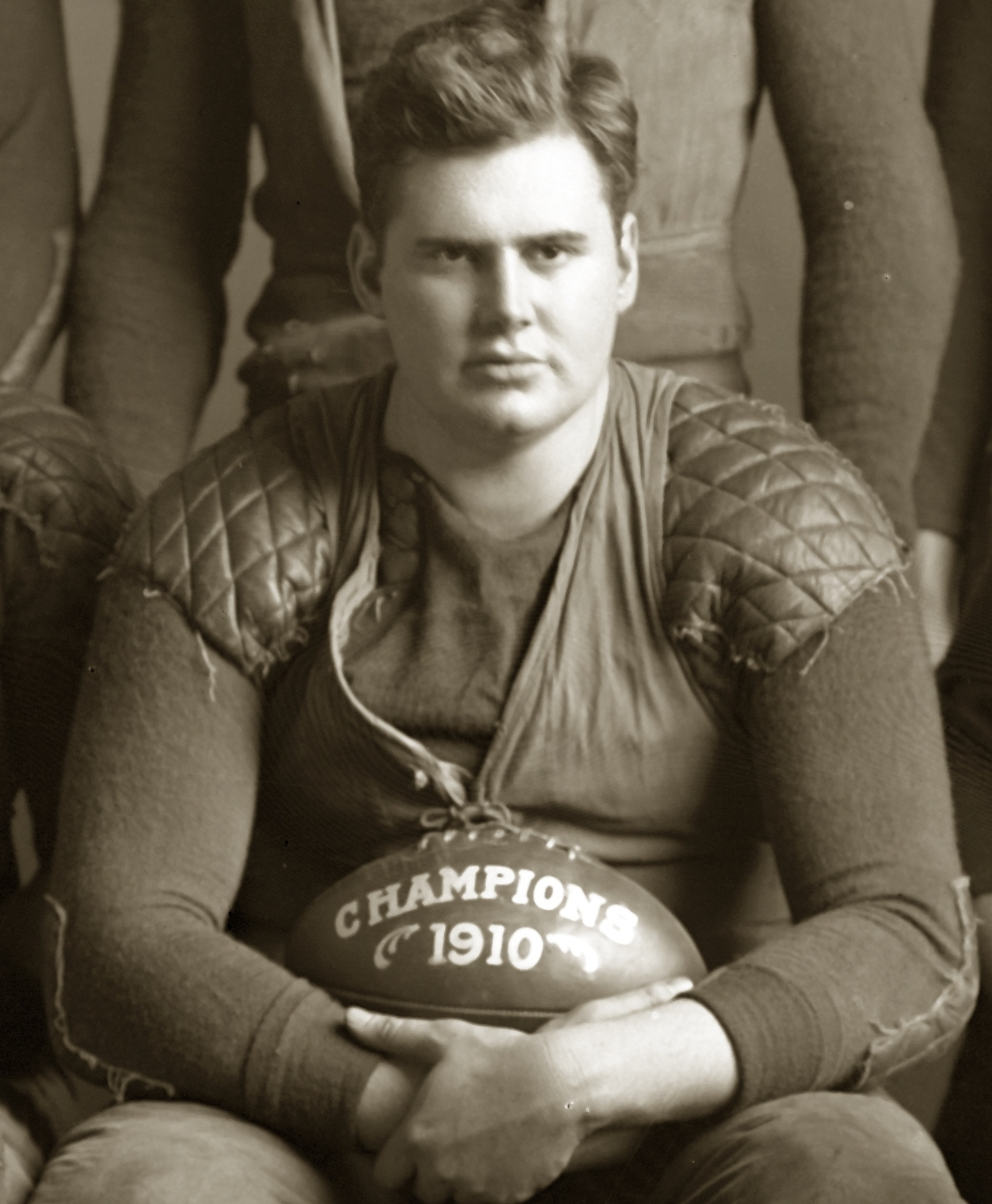
Albert Benbrook

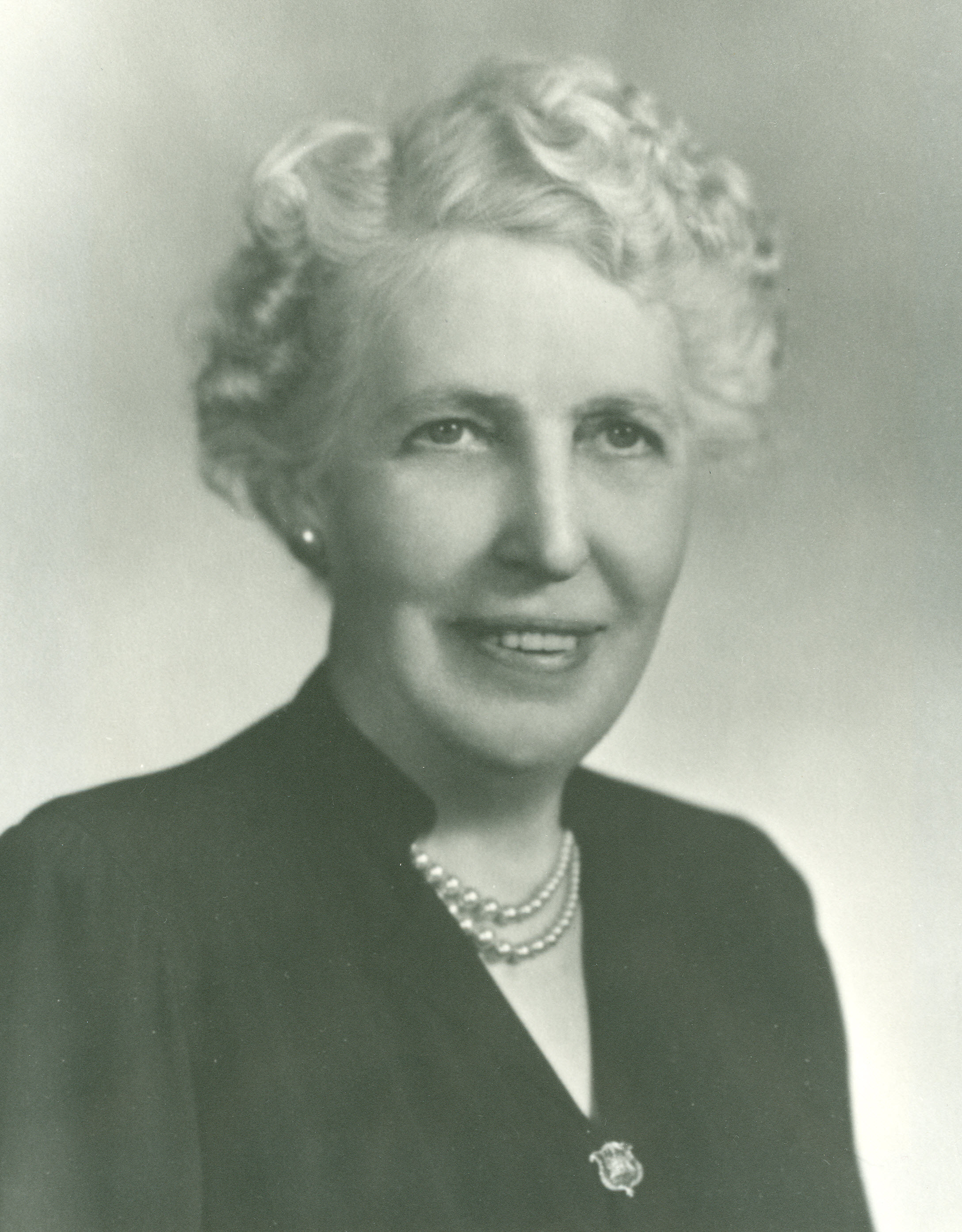
Ruth Thompson

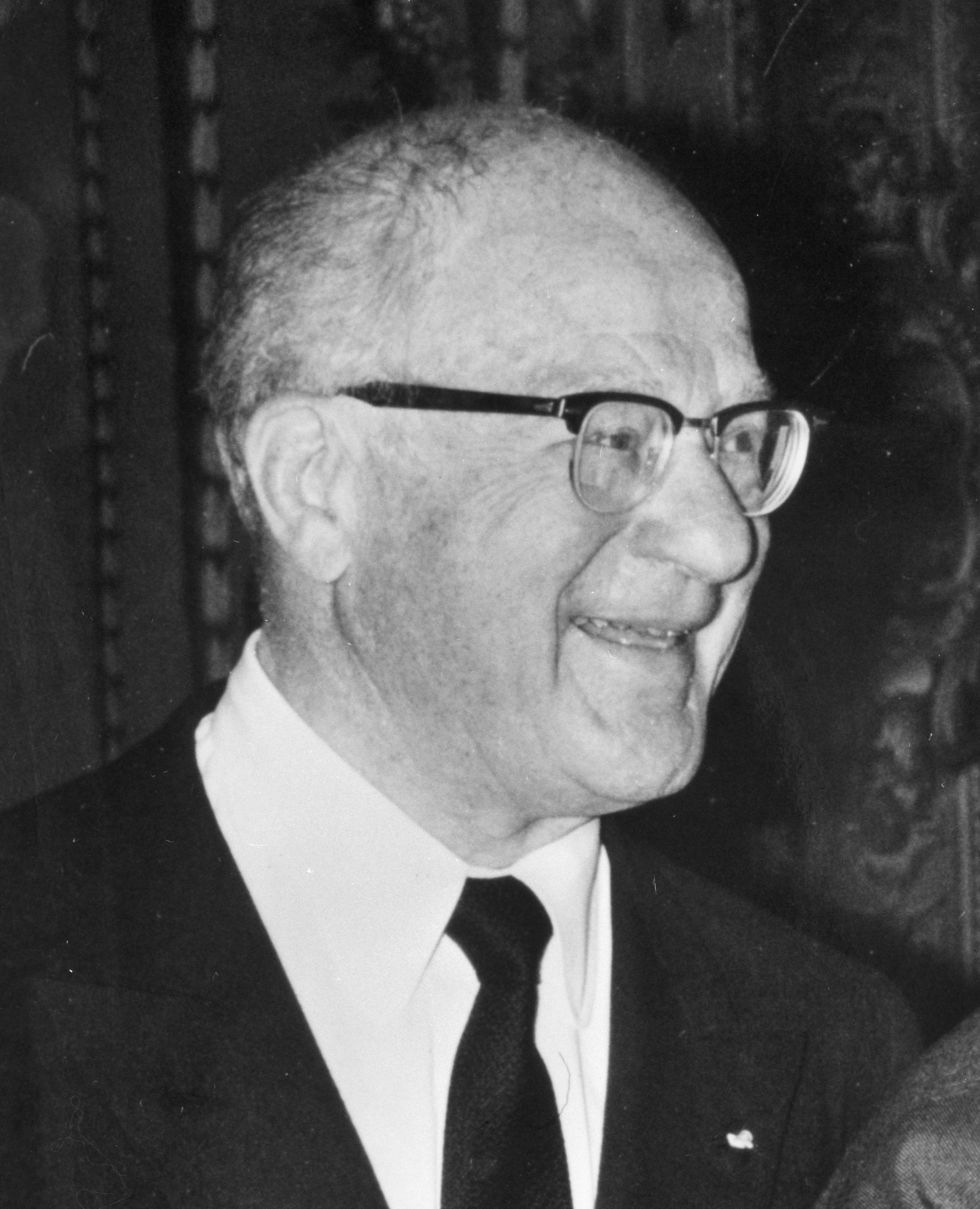
Avery Brundage

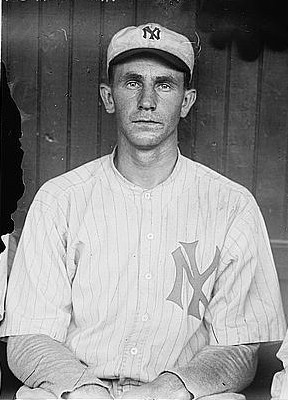
Ray Fisher

== Deaths ==
- January 2 - John Stoughton Newberry, represented Michigan in Congress (1879-1881), at age 60 in Detroit
- March 3 - Edward Breitung, represented Michigan in Congress (1883-1885), at age 55 in Eastman, Georgia
- April 24 - David Preston, banker, philanthropist, and politician, at age 60 in Detroit
- May 19 - Charles E. Stuart, represented Michigan in the U.S. Senate (1853-1859), at age 76 in Kalamazoo
- December 16 - John Clough Holmes, founder of what became Michigan State University, at age 78 in Detroit
- December 22 - Seth C. Moffatt, represented Michigan in Congress (1885-1887), at age 46 in Washington, D.C.

=== Gallery of 1887 deaths ===
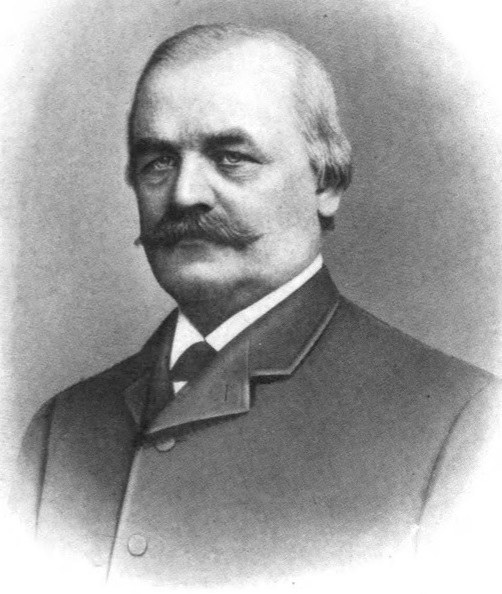
John Stoughton Newberry

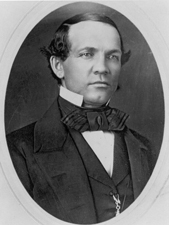
Charles E. Stuart

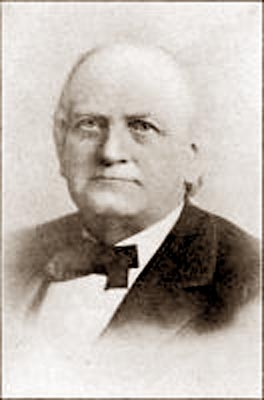
John Clough Holmes

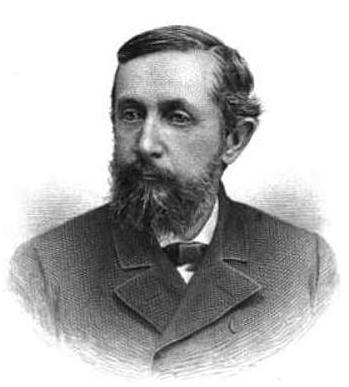
Seth C. Moffatt

== See also ==
- History of Michigan
- History of Detroit
