= 1885 in Michigan =

- Decades: 1860s; 1870s; 1880s; 1890s; 1900s
- See also: History of Michigan; Historical outline of Michigan; List of years in Michigan; 1885 in the United States

Events from the year 1885 in Michigan.

== Office holders ==
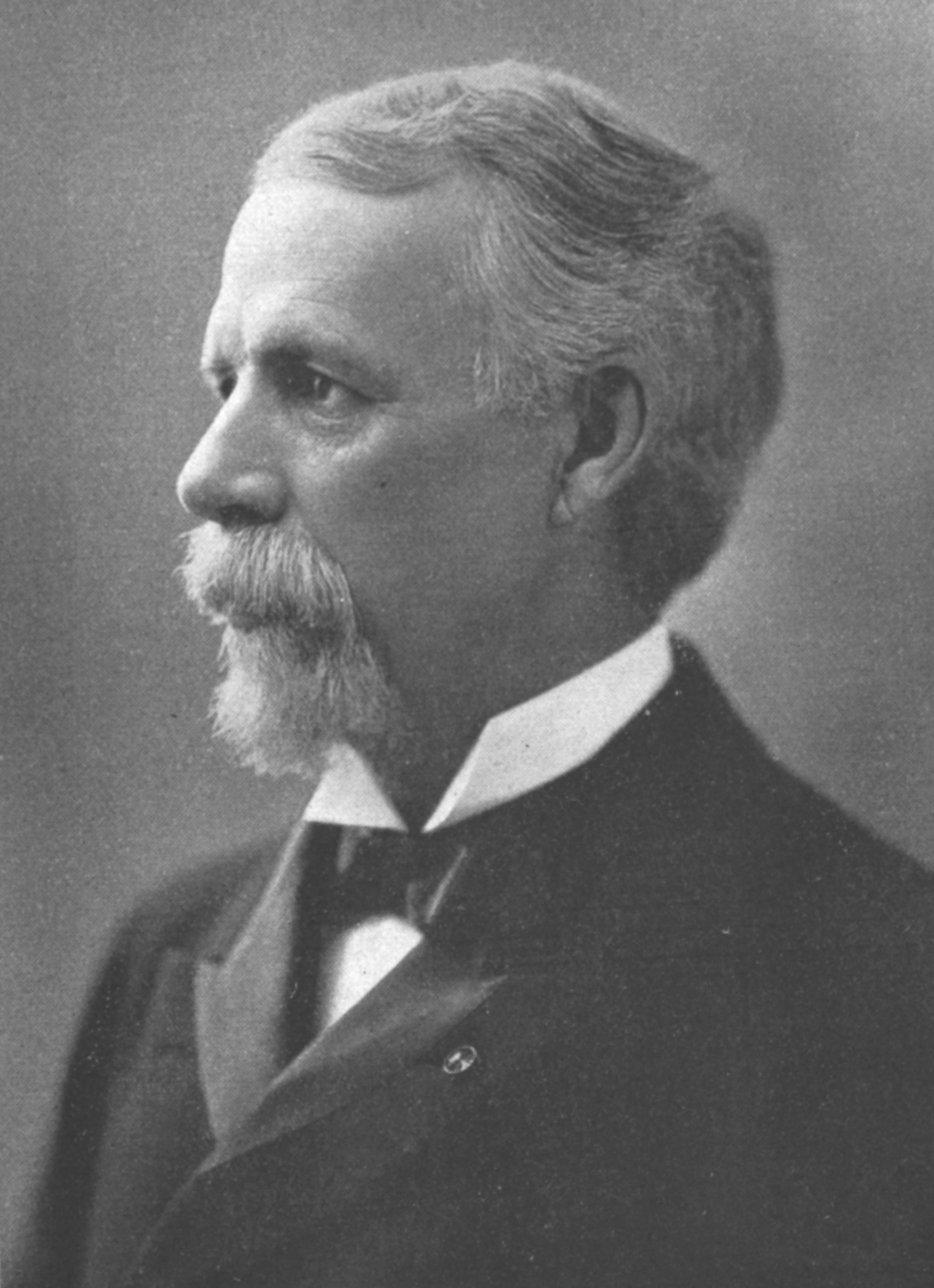
Gov. Alger

=== State office holders ===
- Governor of Michigan: Josiah Begole (Republican)/Russell A. Alger (Republican)
- Lieutenant Governor of Michigan: Moreau S. Crosby (Republican)/Archibald Buttars (Republican)
- Michigan Attorney General: Jacob J. Van Riper/Moses Taggart
- Michigan Secretary of State: Harry A. Conant (Republican)
- State Land Commissioner: Minor Newell (Republican)
- Speaker of the Michigan House of Representatives: Newcomb Clark (Republican)
- Chief Justice, Michigan Supreme Court: James V. Campbell/Allen B. Morse

=== Mayors of major cities ===
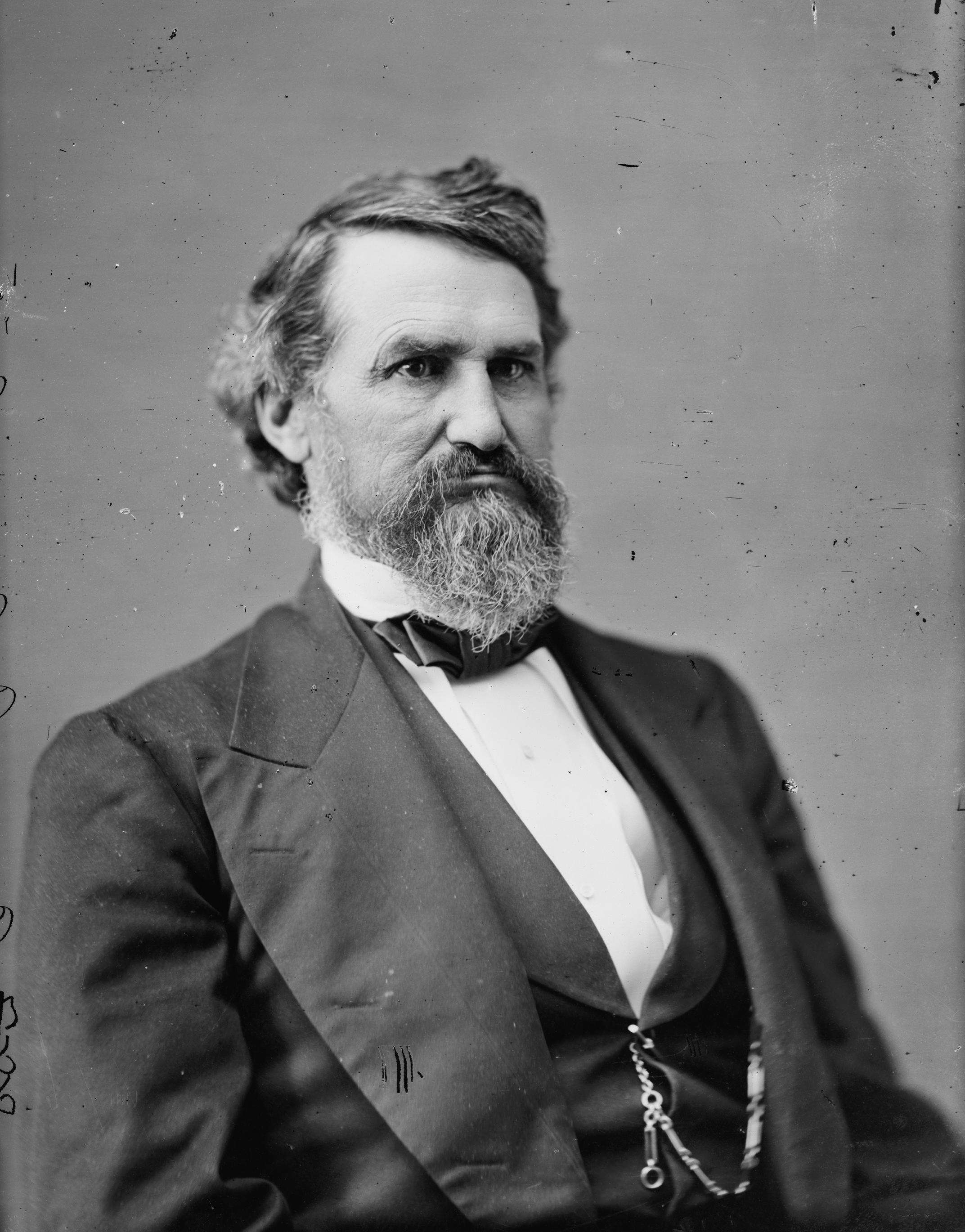
Sen. Conger

- Mayor of Detroit: Stephen Benedict Grummond
- Mayor of Grand Rapids: John L. Curtis
- Mayor of Flint: William W. Joyner
- Mayor of Saginaw: John S. Estabrook
- Mayor of Lansing, Michigan: William Donovan
- Mayor of Ann Arbor: Willard B. Smith

=== Federal office holders ===
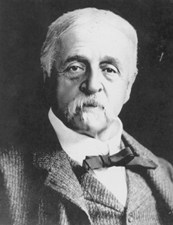
Sen. Palmer

- U.S. Senator from Michigan: Omar D. Conger (Republican)
- U.S. Senator from Michigan: Thomas W. Palmer (Republican)
- House District 1: William C. Maybury (Democrat)
- House District 2: Nathaniel B. Eldredge (Democrat)
- House District 3: Edward S. Lacey (Republican)/James O'Donnell (Republican)
- House District 4: George L. Yaple (Democrat)/Julius C. Burrows (Republican)
- House District 5: Julius Houseman (Democrat)/Charles C. Comstock (Democrat)
- House District 6: Edwin B. Winans (Democrat)
- House District 7: Ezra C. Carleton (Democrat)
- House District 8: Roswell G. Horr (Republican)/Timothy E. Tarsney (Democrat)
- House District 9: Byron M. Cutcheon (Republican)
- House District 10: Herschel H. Hatch (Republican)/Spencer O. Fisher (Democrat)
- House District 11: Edward Breitung (Republican)/Seth C. Moffatt (Republican)

== Population ==
In the 1880 United States census, Michigan was recorded as having a population of 1,636,937. By 1890, Michigan's population had increased by 27.9% to 2,093,890.

=== Cities ===
The following is a list of cities in Michigan with a population of at least 5,000 based on 1880 U.S. Census data. Historic census data from 1870 and 1890 is included to reflect trends in population increases or decreases.

| 1880 Rank | City | County | 1870 Pop. | 1880 Pop. | 1890 Pop. | Change 1880-1890 |
|---|---|---|---|---|---|---|
| 1 | Detroit | Wayne | 79,577 | 116,340 | 205,876 | 77.0% |
| 2 | Grand Rapids | Kent | 16,507 | 32,016 | 60,278 | 88.3% |
| 3 | Bay City | Bay | 7,064 | 20,693 | 27,839 | 34.5% |
| 4 | Jackson | Jackson | 14,447 | 16,105 | 20,798 | 29.1% |
| 5 | Kalamazoo | Kalamazoo | 9,181 | 11,937 | 17,853 | 49.6% |
| 6 | Muskegon | Muskegon | 6,002 | 11,262 | 22,702 | 101.6% |
| 7 | Saginaw | Saginaw | 7,460 | 10,525 | 46,322 | 340.1% |
| 8 | Port Huron | St. Clair | 5,973 | 8,883 | 13,543 | 52.5% |
| 9 | Flint | Genesee | 5,386 | 8,409 | 9,803 | 16.6% |
| 10 | Lansing | Ingham | 5,241 | 8,319 | 13,102 | 57.5% |
| 11 | Ann Arbor | Washtenaw | 7,363 | 8,061 | 9,431 | 17.0% |
| 12 | Adrian | Lenawee | 8,438 | 7,849 | 8,756 | 11.6% |
| 13 | Battle Creek | Calhoun | 5,838 | 7,063 | 13,197 | 86.8% |
| 14 | Manistee | Manistee | 3,343 | 6,930 | 12,812 | 84.9% |
| 15 | Alpena | Alpena | -- | 6,153 | 11,283 | 83.4% |

=== Counties ===
The following is a list of counties in Michigan with populations of at least 30,000 based on 1880 U.S. Census data. Historic census data from 1870 and 1890 are included to reflect trends in population increases or decreases.

| 1880 Rank | County | Largest city | 1870 Pop. | 1880 Pop. | 1890 Pop. | Change 1880-1890 |
|---|---|---|---|---|---|---|
| 1 | Wayne | Detroit | 119,068 | 168,444 | 257,114 | 52.6% |
| 2 | Kent | Grand Rapids | 50,403 | 73,253 | 109,922 | 50.1% |
| 3 | Saginaw | Saginaw | 39,097 | 59,095 | 82,273 | 39.2% |
| 4 | St. Clair | Port Huron | 36,661 | 46,197 | 52,105 | 12.8% |
| 5 | Jackson | Jackson | 36,047 | 42,031 | 45,031 | 7.1% |
| 6 | Washtenaw | Ann Arbor | 41,434 | 41,848 | 42,210 | 0.9% |
| 7 | Oakland | Pontiac | 40,867 | 41,537 | 41,245 | −0.7% |
| 8 | Calhoun | Battle Creek | 36,569 | 38,452 | 43,501 | 13.1% |
| 9 | Bay | Bay City | 15,900 | 38,081 | 56,412 | 48.1% |
| 10 | Berrien | Niles | 35,104 | 36,785 | 41,285 | 12.2% |

== Sports ==
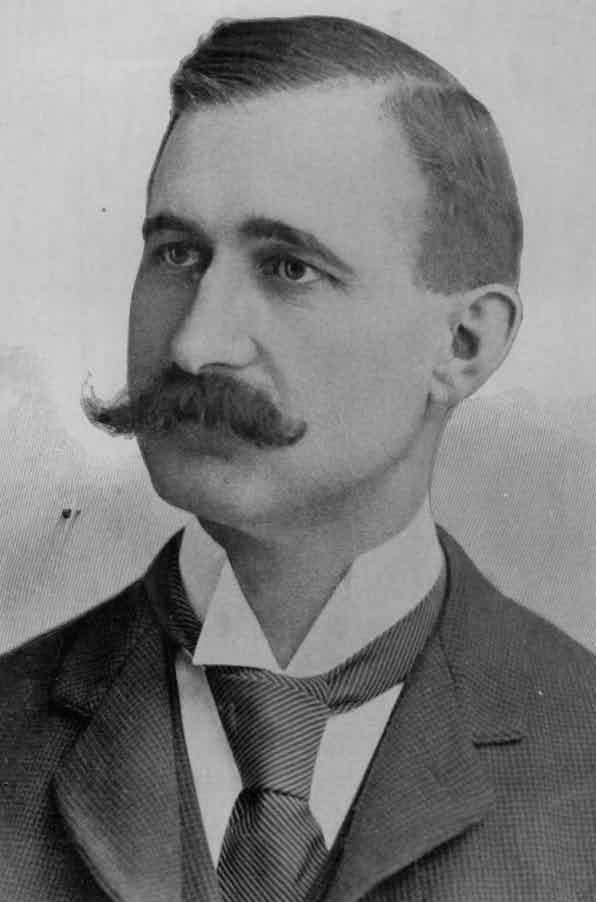
Sam Thompson

=== Baseball ===
- 1885 Detroit Wolverines season – Under managers Charlie Morton and Bill Watkins, the Detroit baseball team finished in sixth place in the National League with a 41–67 record. The team's statistical leaders included Sam Thompson with a .303 batting average and seven home runs, Charlie Bennett with 60 RBIs, Stump Weidman with 14 pitching wins, and Lady Baldwin with a 1.86 earned run average.
- 1885 Michigan Wolverines baseball season - The Wolverines compiled a 2–1 record. John Hibbard was the team captain.

=== American football ===
- 1885 Michigan Wolverines football team – The Wolverines compiled a 3–0 record and outscored their opponents by a combined score of 82 to 2. The team captain was Horace Greely Prettyman.

== Chronology of events ==
=== April ===
- April 14 - A bill passed the Michigan Senate providing for the creation of the Michigan Mining School, later renamed Michigan Technological University. The bill became law effective May 1

=== June ===
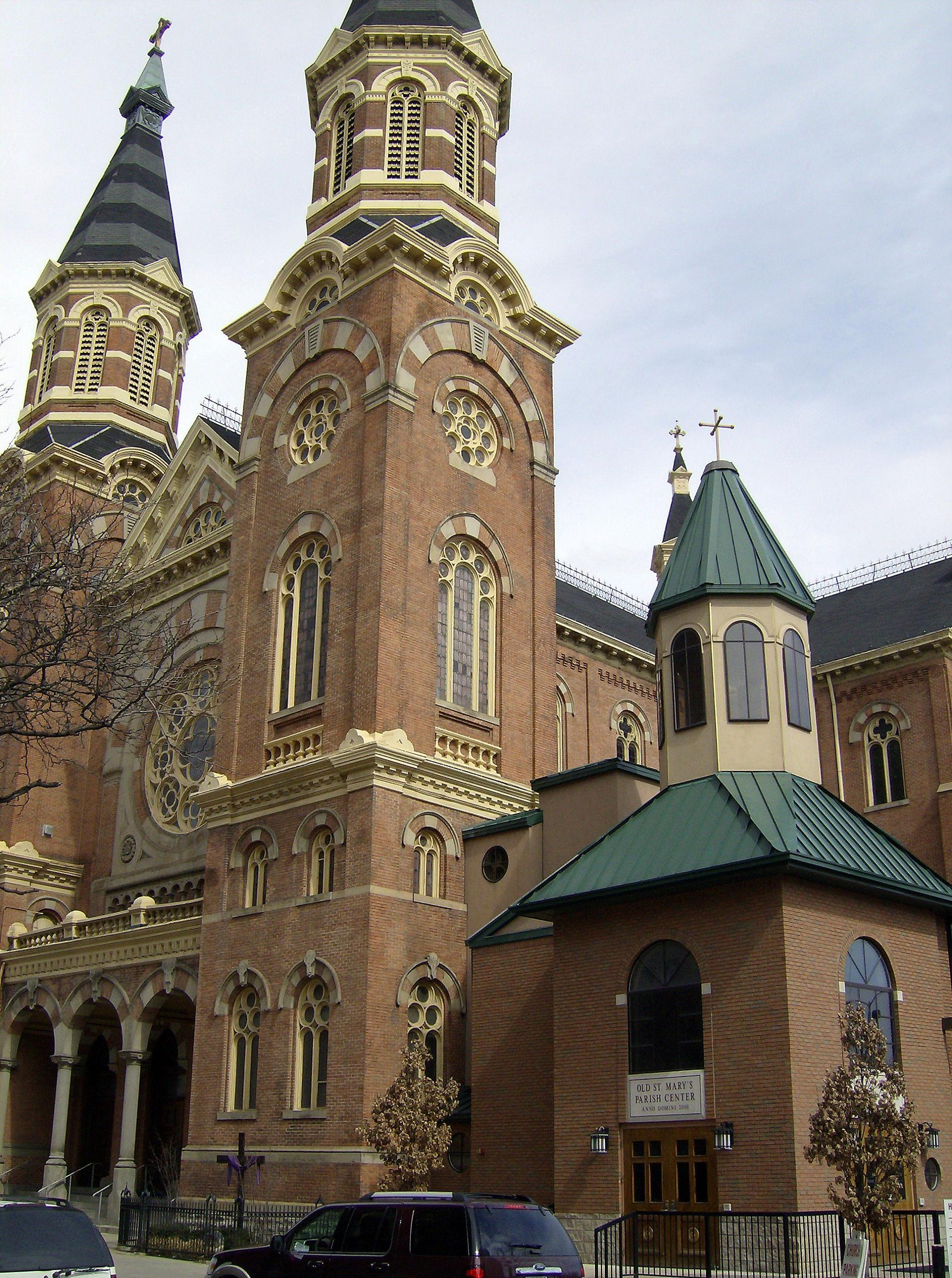
St. Mary Catholic Church

=== July ===
- July - A strike by mill workers in the Saginaw Valley shut down 98 mills, idling 8,000 men. The strike focused on demands for a 10-hour work day.

=== August ===
- August 16 - St. Mary Catholic Church in Detroit's Greektown was dedicated.

=== December ===
- December 1–2 - Police were called to restore order as parishioners at St. Albert's Polish Cathoich Church in Detroit protested the removal of their pastor, Father Kolaskinski, by Bishop Borgess. One man was shot to death on December 24 in continued unrest.
- December 3 - The Barnum Wire and Iron Works in Detroit was completely destroyed by fire, a blaze the Detroit Free Press called "the most dangerous conflagration that has occurred in Detroit for many years".
- December 16 - The murder of Frank Knoch and his family was discovered in the Springwells section of Detroit. The gruesome murders shocked the city and remained a focus of the news for days thereafter.

== Births ==
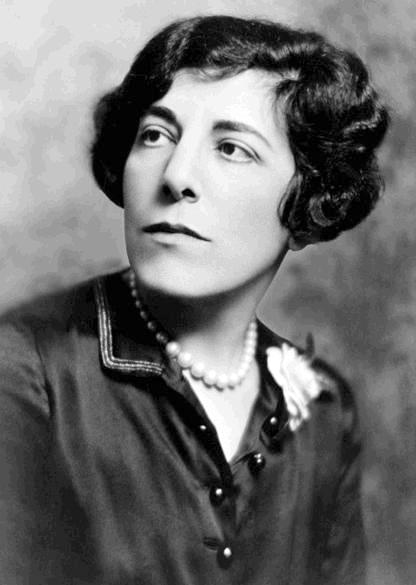
Edna Ferber

- March 6 - Ring Lardner, sports columnist and short story writer, in Niles, Michigan
- August 15 - Edna Ferber, Pulitzer Prize winning novelist and playwright (So Big, Show Boat, Cimarron, Giant), in Kalamazoo, Michigan

== Deaths ==
- June 15 - Petosegay, merchant and fur trader and namesake of Petoskey, Michigan and the Petoskey stone, in Petoskey

== See also ==
- History of Michigan
- History of Detroit
