= Frank W. Wheeler =

American politician and shipbuilder

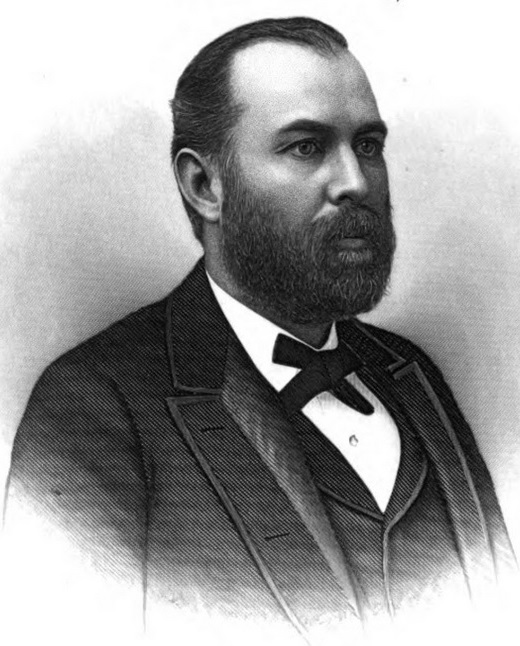
- From 1890s Cyclopedia of Michigan.

Member of the U.S. House of Representatives from Michigan's 10th district
- In office March 4, 1889 – March 3, 1891
- Preceded by: Spencer O. Fisher
- Succeeded by: Thomas A. E. Weadock

Personal details
- Born: Frank Willis Wheeler; March 2, 1853 Chaumont, New York, U.S.
- Died: August 9, 1921 (aged 68) Saginaw, Michigan, U.S.
- Resting place: Elm Lawn Cemetery, Bay City, Michigan
- Party: Republican
- Education: Eastern Michigan University

Frank Willis Wheeler (March 2, 1853 – August 9, 1921) was a shipbuilder and politician from the U.S. state of Michigan, serving one term in the U.S. House of Representatives from 1889 to 1891.

== Biography ==
Wheeler was born in Chaumont, New York attended the common schools. In 1864, he moved with his parents to East Saginaw, Michigan and attended the Saginaw High School and the Ypsilanti State Normal School (now (Eastern Michigan University). He engaged in boatbuilding and moved to West Bay City in 1876. He became master of the Saginaw River Tug Association and engaged in shipbuilding at the Bay Cities for many years.

=== Congress ===
In 1888, Wheeler was the Republican candidate for the U.S. House of Representatives from Michigan's 10th congressional district and defeated incumbent Democrat Spencer O. Fisher to be elected to the 51st Congress. Wheeler served from March 4, 1889 to March 3, 1891 and was not a candidate for reelection in 1890.

=== Later career ===
After leaving Congress, Wheeler engaged in his former pursuits until 1899, when he moved to Detroit. He returned to Saginaw in 1917 and organized the Saginaw Shipbuilding Co. and was engaged in building boats for the United States Government.

=== Death and burial ===
Frank W. Wheeler died in Saginaw and is interred in Elm Lawn Cemetery, Bay City, Michigan.

U.S. House of Representatives
Preceded by Spencer O. Fisher	United States Representative for the 10th congressional district of Michigan; 1889 – 1891	Succeeded by Thomas A. E. Weadock
