= Rousseau O. Crump =

American politician

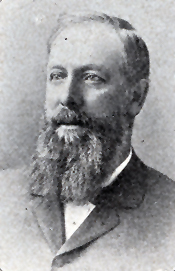

Member of the U.S. House of Representatives from Michigan's 10th district
- In office March 4, 1895 – May 1, 1901
- Preceded by: Thomas A. E. Weadock
- Succeeded by: Henry H. Aplin

Mayor of West Bay City
- In office 1892–1895
- Preceded by: William J. Martin
- Succeeded by: Peter Lind

Personal details
- Born: Rousseau Owen Crump; May 20, 1843 Pittsford, New York
- Died: May 1, 1901 (aged 57) West Bay City, Michigan
- Resting place: Elm Lawn Cemetery, Bay City, Michigan
- Party: Republican

Rousseau Owen Crump (May 20, 1843 – May 1, 1901) was a American businessman and politician who served three terms in the U.S. House of Representatives from the U.S. state of Michigan from 1895 to 1901.

== Biography ==
Crump was born in Pittsford, New York, the eldest son of Samuel and Sarah (Cutting) Crump. His parents had settled in Pittsford in April 1842 after emigrating from England soon after marrying. His father was born and educated in Kent, while his mother was from Suffolk. His father had experience as a builder and continued his trade in the United States. Rouseau was educated in the public schools of Pittsford and Rochester.

After finishing his education, he worked for a time with his father as a builder, and then learned the trade of wagon and carriage making. After finishing his apprenticeship, he took up another trade, that of ship-carpentering, helping to build one of the largest sailing vessels on the Great Lakes. After it was finished in the fall of 1864, he took an extended trip on her as a finishing ship-joiner, going the whole length of Lakes Erie, Huron, and Michigan, stopping at Detroit, Port Huron, Mackinaw, Chicago, and Milwaukee.

In 1865, Crump engaged with Colonel Abel Streight, who had escaped from the Confederate Libby Prison with 107 other soldiers during the Civil War. Crump worked as a salesman at Streight's Indianapolis lumberyards for nearly a year, until poor health forced him to return to New York to recuperate.

Crump resigned his position in 1868 and married Phebe A. Tucker of Craigsville, New York, and then went to Winona, Minnesota, to work with the Laird, Norton & Co., planing mill and lumberyard. In 1869, he undertook to start a lumber business in Plainwell, Michigan, building his first home there and achieving moderate success. Due to poor health, he again returned to Pittsford in December 1875. In 1876, he formed a partnership with D. B. Eder, with whom he operated a planing mill and lumberyard until 1879. In 1877, he was one of a company that built and operated a powder mill near Syracuse, which blew up that same year and took most of Crump's capital with it. Crump next formed a business partnership with his uncle, James Cutting, in Simcoe, Ontario, where they operated a general lumber, stave, sash, shingle, and door factory.

In the summer of 1881, Crump and his wife made a tour of the Great Lakes, visiting Northern Michigan, including the Bay City area. Crump negotiated a lease with A. C. Haven in West Bay City (now part of Bay City) for a site to establish a new lumber operation. Crump and his uncle moved their entire business to the new location. In September 1881, construction began on a large mill which became operational in October. Cutting sold his interest to Crump in the fall of 1883, and in February 1884, Crump's Manufacturing Company was incorporated as a stock company under Michigan law, with Crump as the principal shareholder. His brother, S. G. Crump was president, R. O. Crump was secretary and manager, and his son, Shelley C. Crump was treasurer. The company dropped the retail lumber, sash, door, and blind business and became one of the largest box and package manufacturing plants in the country at that time, employing over 100 persons.

=== Family ===
Crump and his wife raised one son and four daughters. Shelley C. and Millie were born in Plainwell, Mabel A. in Pittsford, while Enid and Susie were born in West Bay City.

=== Political career ===
In West Bay City, Crump served on the board of aldermen from 1889 to 1892. In the fall of 1890, he ran unsuccessfully for the Michigan House of Representatives. In 1892, he was elected mayor, serving from 1892 to 1895.

In 1894, he was elected as a Republican from Michigan's 10th congressional district to the 54th United States Congress and to the three succeeding Congresses, serving from March 4, 1895 until his death in 1901. In the 56th congress, he was chairman of the Committee on Mines and Mining.

=== Death and burial ===
Crump died, while in office, in West Bay City just three weeks before his fifty-eighth birthday, and is interred in Elm Lawn Cemetery of Bay City, Michigan.

=== Affiliations ===
Crump was a member of the Episcopal Church and was active in Masonic fraternities, including the Royal Arcanum, Foresters, Pythians, Knights Templar, Michigan Sovereign Consistory of Detroit and Moslem Temple, and the Ancient Order of United Workmen.

== See also ==
- List of members of the United States Congress who died in office (1900–1949)

U.S. House of Representatives
Preceded by Thomas A. E. Weadock	United States Representative for the 10th congressional district of Michigan; 1895–1901	Succeeded by Henry H. Alpin
