= Spencer O. Fisher =

American politician

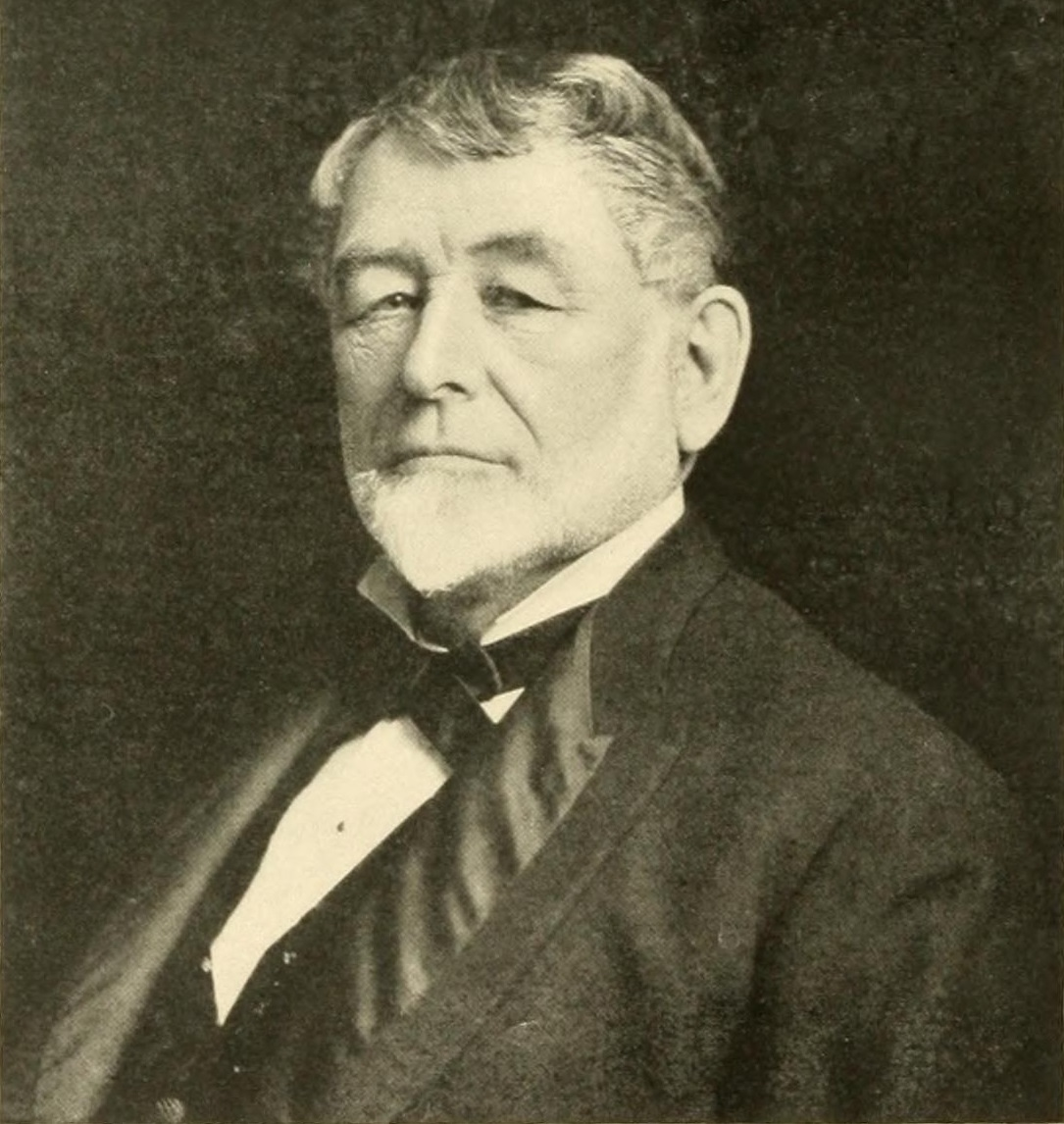
- From 1905's History of Bay County, Michigan and Representative Citizens.

Member of the U.S. House of Representatives from Michigan's 10th district
- In office March 4, 1885 – March 3, 1889
- Preceded by: Herschel H. Hatch
- Succeeded by: Frank W. Wheeler

Personal details
- Born: Spencer Oliver Fisher; February 3, 1843 Camden, Michigan, U.S.
- Died: June 1, 1919 (aged 76) Bay City, Michigan, U.S.
- Resting place: Elm Lawn Cemetery
- Party: Democratic
- Education: Albion College; Hillsdale College

Spencer Oliver Fisher (February 3, 1843 – June 1, 1919), was a businessman and politician from the U.S. state of Michigan, serving two terms in the U.S. House of Representatives from 1885 to 1889.

== Biography ==
Fisher was born in Camden, Michigan, where he attended the public schools. He also attended Albion College and Hillsdale College. He engaged in lumbering and banking in West Bay City, where he was mayor from 1881 to 1884.

He was a delegate to the Democratic National Convention of 1884

=== Congress ===
Fisher was elected as a Democrat from Michigan's 10th congressional district to the 49th and 50th Congresses, serving from March 4, 1885 to March 3, 1889. He was an unsuccessful candidate for reelection in 1888, being defeated by Frank W. Wheeler.

== = Later career ==
After leaving office, he resumed his former business pursuits in Bay City.

Fisher was a candidate for Governor of Michigan in 1894, but was defeated by the Republican incumbent John T. Rich.

=== Death and burial ===
He died twenty-five years later at the age of seventy-six in Bay City and is interred there in Elm Lawn Cemetery.

Party political offices
Preceded by Allen B. Morse	Democratic nominee for Governor of Michigan; 1894	Succeeded by Charles R. Sligh
U.S. House of Representatives
Preceded by Herschel H. Hatch	United States Representative for the 10th congressional district of Michigan; 1885 – 1889	Succeeded by Frank W. Wheeler
