= John Pridgeon Jr. =

American politician

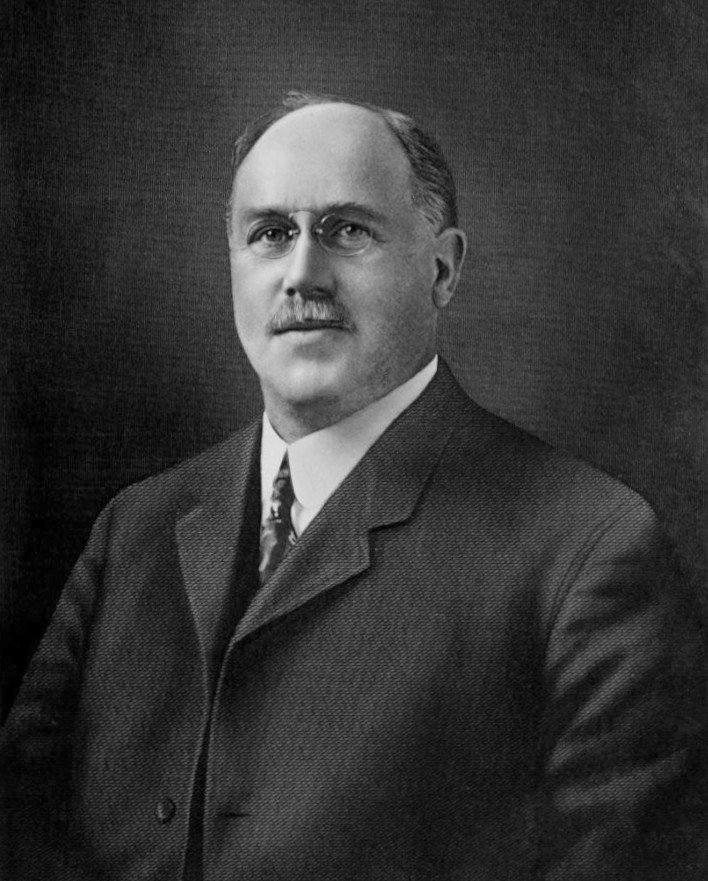

Mayor of Detroit
- In office 1888–1889
- Preceded by: Marvin H. Chamberlain
- Succeeded by: Hazen S. Pingree

Personal details
- Born: August 1, 1852 Detroit, Michigan
- Died: March 16, 1929 (aged 76) Cambridge, Massachusetts
- Spouses: Cora Edgar (m. 1874; div. 1911) Blanche Pridgeon Cate (m. 1915)
- Children: 2
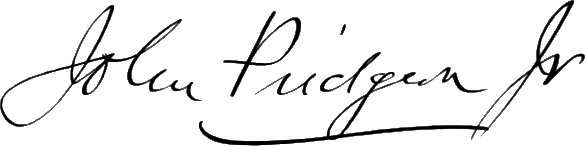
- Signature

John Pridgeon Jr. (August 1, 1852 – March 16, 1929) was an American businessman and politician who was the mayor of Detroit from 1888 to 1889. He was president of the Pridgeon Transportation Company, a marine transport company.

== Biography ==
Pridgeon was born in Detroit on August 1, 1852, the son of Captain John and Emma Nicholson Pridgeon. Pridgeon was educated in the Detroit Public Schools and the Detroit Business University.

In 1871, he joined as a clerk his father's business of buying, selling, and operating sailing ships and tugs; the family also owned and operated the Detroit & Windsor Ferry.

In 1874, Pridgeon married Cora Edgar; the couple had two sons, neither of whom outlived their parents. In 1911, Cora sued for and was granted a divorce. In 1915, Pridgeon married a second time to Mrs. Blanche Pridgeon Cate, the widow of a classmate of Woodrow Wilson and a distant relative.

In 1876 he became an agent of the Chicago and Grand Trunk line of steamers, stationed at Port Huron, Michigan; in 1879 the line was dismantled and he rejoined his father's business.

Pridgeon was a member of the first Park Commission, serving from 1879 to 1883. He was elected to the city council as a Democrat. in 1885, and in 1887 was elected mayor of Detroit, serving one term from 1888 to 1889. He later served as a member of the Police Commission from 1891- 1892.

After his stint as mayor, Pridgeon diversified his business interests, and in the years 1890 to 1900 served variously as president of the State Transportation Company, president of the Pridgeon Transportation Company, vice-president of the White Star Line, vice-president of the Red Star Line, and vice-president of the River Savings Bank.

John Pridgeon Jr. died in Cambridge, Massachusetts on March 16, 1929.

Political offices
Preceded by Marvin H. Chamberlain	Mayor of Detroit; 1888–1889	Succeeded by Hazen S. Pingree
