= United States House Committee on Mines and Mining =

The United States House Committee on Mines and Mining is a defunct committee of the U.S. House of Representatives.

The Committee on Mines and Mining was created on December 19, 1865, for consideration of subjects relating to mining interests. It exercised jurisdiction over the Geological Survey, the Bureau of Mines, the establishment of mining schools and mining experimental stations, mineral land laws, the welfare of men working in mines, mining debris, relief in cases of mineral contracts connected with the prosecution of war, the mining of radium ore, and the Government's fuel yards in the District of Columbia.

In 1947, the committee was abolished and its duties were transferred to the United States House Committee on Public Lands.

== Chairmen ==
Chair	Party	State	Start of service	End of service
William Higby	Republican	California	1865	1869
Orange Ferriss	Republican	New York	1869	1871
Henry Waldron	Republican	Michigan	1871	1873
David Perley Lowe	Republican	Kansas	1873	1875
Richard P. Bland	Democratic	Missouri	1875	1877
George M. Beebe	Democratic	New York	1877	1879
Adlai Stevenson I	Democratic	Illinois	1879	1881
John Van Voorhis	Republican	New York	1881	1883
Richard Warner	Democratic	Tennessee	1883	1885
Martin L. Clardy	Democratic	Missouri	1885	1887
Charles Triplett O'Ferrall	Democratic	Virginia	1887	1889
Thomas H. Carter	Republican	Montana	1889	1891
William H. H. Cowles	Democratic	North Carolina	1891	1893
Thomas A. E. Weadock	Democratic	Michigan	1893	1895
David D. Aitken	Republican	Michigan	1895	1897
Charles H. Grosvenor	Republican	Ohio	1897	1899
Rousseau Owen Crump	Republican	Michigan	1899	1901
Frank Eddy	Republican	Minnesota	1901	1903
Webster E. Brown	Republican	Wisconsin	1903	1907
George Franklin Huff	Republican	Pennsylvania	1907	1911
Martin D. Foster	Democratic	Illinois	1911	1919
Mahlon Morris Garland	Republican	Pennsylvania	1919	1920
Marion E. Rhodes	Republican	Missouri	1921	1923
John M. Robsion	Republican	Kentucky	1923	1930
William H. Sproul	Republican	Kansas	1930	1931
Joe L. Smith	Democratic	West Virginia	1931	1945
Andrew Lawrence Somers	Democratic	New York	1945	1947
