= Henry W. Seymour =

American politician

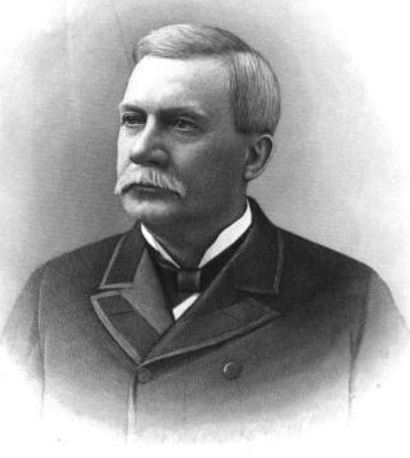
- From 1900's Cyclopedia of Michigan

Member of the U.S. House of Representatives from Michigan's 11th district
- In office February 14, 1888 – March 3, 1889
- Preceded by: Seth C. Moffatt
- Succeeded by: Samuel M. Stephenson

Personal details
- Born: July 21, 1834 Brockport, New York, U.S.
- Died: April 7, 1906 (aged 71) Washington, D.C., U.S.
- Party: Republican
- Education: Williams College; Albany Law School

Henry William Seymour (July 21, 1834 – April 7, 1906) was a politician from the U.S. state of Michigan.

Seymour was born in Brockport, New York and attended the public schools, Brockport Collegiate Institute, and Canandaigua Academy. He graduated from Williams College of Williamstown, Massachusetts in 1855. He studied law in Albany, New York taking lectures at Albany Law School and was admitted to the bar in May 1856, but never practiced.

Seymour engaged in mercantile pursuits in Brockport until 1872 when he moved to Sault Ste. Marie, Michigan where he engaged in the manufacture of reapers and subsequently in the manufacture of lumber and in agricultural pursuits. He was a member of the Michigan House of Representatives from Cheboygan District, 1880–1882 and a member of the Michigan Senate 1882–1884 (31st District) and 1886–1888 (30th District).

In a special election on February 14, 1888, to fill the vacancy caused by the death of Seth C. Moffatt, Seymour was elected as a Republican from Michigan's 11th congressional district to the 50th Congress, serving from February 14, 1888, to March 3, 1889. He was an unsuccessful candidate for re-nomination in 1888, losing to fellow Republican Samuel M. Stephenson in the primaries.

Henry W. Seymour died at the age of seventy-one, while on a visit, in Washington, D.C. He is interred at Lakeview Cemetery of Brockport.

U.S. House of Representatives
Preceded by Seth C. Moffatt	United States Representative for the 11th congressional district of Michigan; 1888 – 1889	Succeeded by Samuel M. Stephenson
