= Thomas A. E. Weadock =

American judge and politician

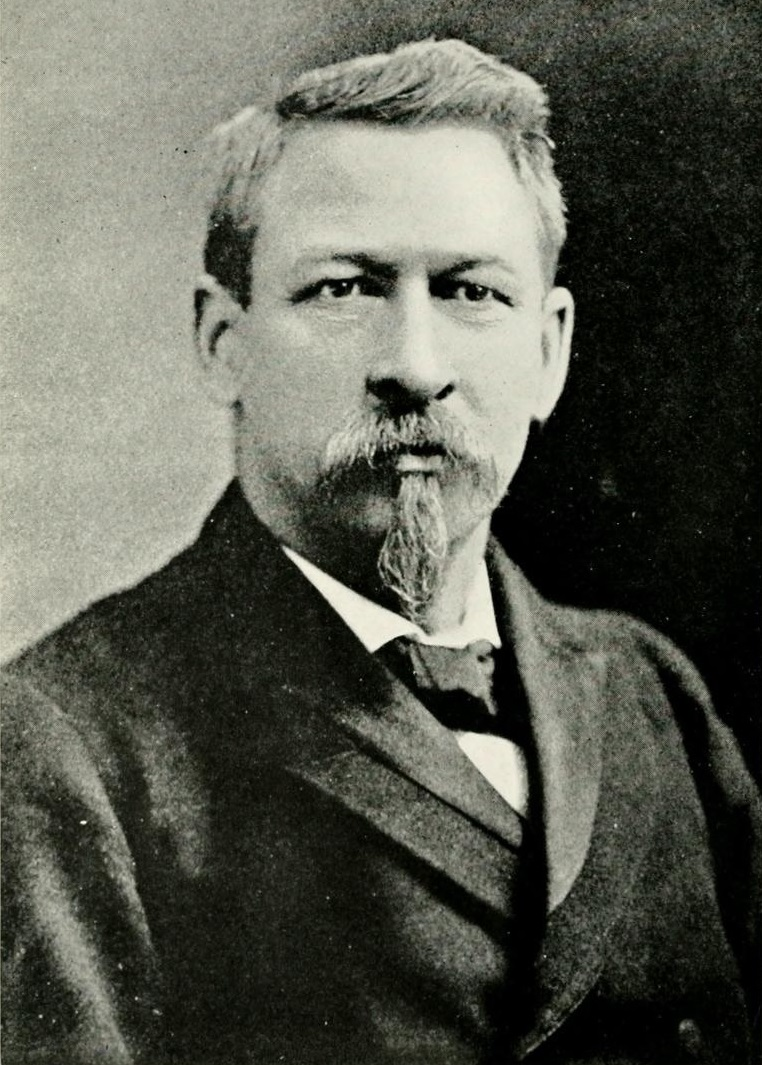
- From Volume 3 (1920) of Andrew Jackson and Early Tennessee History by Samuel Gordon Heiskell.

Member of the U.S. House of Representatives from Michigan's 10th district
- In office March 4, 1891 – March 3, 1895
- Preceded by: Frank W. Wheeler
- Succeeded by: Rousseau O. Crump

Personal details
- Born: Thomas Addis Emmet Weadock; January 1, 1850 Ballygarrett, County Wexford, Ireland, U.K.
- Died: November 18, 1938 (aged 88) Detroit, Michigan, U.S.
- Resting place: St. Patrick's Cemetery, Bay City, Michigan
- Party: Democratic
- Spouses: Mary E. Tarsney (m. 1874; died 1889) Nannie E. Curstiss (m. 1893; died 1927)

Thomas Addis Emmet Weadock (January 1, 1850 – November 18, 1938) was a judge and politician from the U.S. state of Michigan. From 1891 to 1895, he served two terms in the U.S. House of Representatives.

== Early life ==
Weadock was born in Ballygarrett in County Wexford on the island of Ireland (then a part of the U.K.). He immigrated to the United States in infancy with his parents, Lewis Weadock and Mary (Cullen) Weadock, who settled on a farm near St. Marys, Ohio. He was educated in the common schools and the Union School at St. Marys and taught school in the counties of Auglaize, Shelby, and Miami for five years. His brother, George W. Weadock, was a mayor of Saginaw and the father and grandfather of state senators.

== Education and career ==
Weadock graduated from the law department of the University of Michigan at Ann Arbor in March 1873 and was admitted to the bar the same year commencing practice in Bay City. The following year, he married Mary E. Tarsney a sister of two U.S. Representatives: Timothy E. Tarsney of Michigan and John Charles Tarsney of Missouri.

Weadock served in the State militia 1874–1877; was prosecuting attorney of Bay County in 1877 and 1878; chairman of the Democratic State conventions in 1883 and 1894; mayor of Bay City 1883–1885; and member of the board of education of Bay City in 1884. His first wife, Mary, died in 1889. Later, in 1893, he married Nannie E. Curtiss, who died in 1927.

=== Congress ===
In 1890, Weadock was elected as a Democrat from Michigan's 10th congressional district to the 52nd Congress and was re-elected in 1892 to the 53rd Congress, serving from March 4, 1891, to March 3, 1895. He was chairman of the Committee on Mines and Mining during the 53rd Congress. He declined to be a candidate for reelection in 1894, but was a delegate at large to the 1896 Democratic National Convention.

=== Later career ===
After leaving Congress, Weadock resumed the practice of law in Bay City, and later moved to Detroit continuing to practice. He was an unsuccessful Democratic candidate for judge of the Michigan Supreme Court in 1904. Eight years later, he was appointed a professor of law at the University of Detroit in 1912. Six years later in 1933, he was appointed an associate justice of the state supreme court.

Thomas A. E. Weadock was also a member of the American Bar Association and the Ancient Order of Hibernians.

=== Death and burial ===
He died in Detroit at the age of eighty-eight and is interred in St. Patrick's Cemetery of Bay City.

Party political offices
Preceded by Mortimer Elwyn Cooley	Democratic nominee for U.S. Senator from Michigan (Class 2); 1930	Succeeded by Prentiss M. Brown
U.S. House of Representatives
Preceded by Frank W. Wheeler	United States Representative for the 10th congressional district of Michigan; 1891 – 1895	Succeeded by Rousseau O. Crump
