= Lake View Cemetery (Brockport, New York) =

Historic cemetery in New York, United States

- Lakeview Cemetery
- U.S. National Register of Historic Places
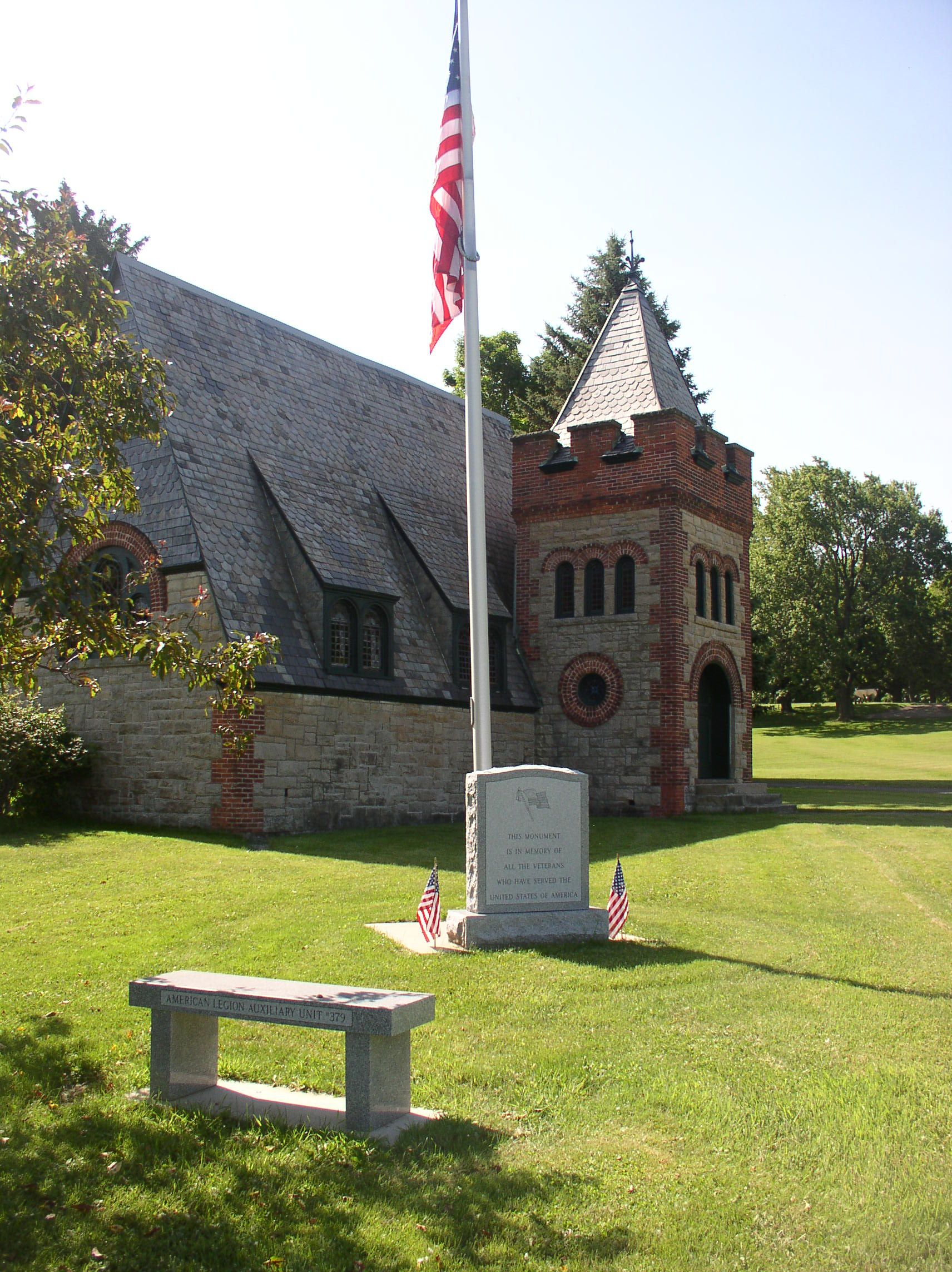

- Location within New York Location within the United States
- Location: New York State Route 19, near Brockport, New York
- Coordinates: 43.19262°N 77.94377°W
- Area: 62.8 acres (25.4 ha)
- Built: 1891
- Architectural style: Romanesque Revival
- NRHP reference No.: 09000559
- Added to NRHP: July 24, 2009

Lake View Cemetery is a historic rural cemetery in the town of Sweden, near Brockport in Monroe County, New York. The cemetery was established in 1891. It includes a Romanesque Revival style chapel / receiving vault, a small pond, a cast iron tiered fountain, and a distinctive serpentine road system.

The cemetery has more than 5,000 burials. Among the noted burials are actress Nancy Coleman (1912–2000) and US Congressmen Henry W. Seymour (1834–1906) & Richard C. Shannon (1839–1920).

It was listed on the National Register of Historic Places in 2009.
