= Herschel H. Hatch =

American politician

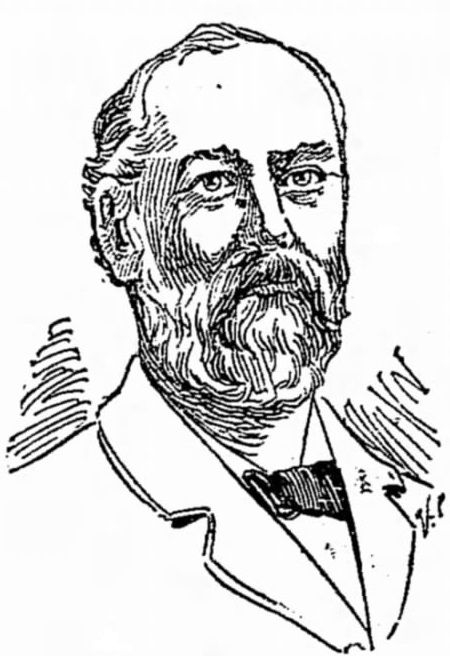
- Detroit Free Press, February 22, 1895.

Member of the U.S. House of Representatives from Michigan's 10th district
- In office March 4, 1883 – March 3, 1885
- Preceded by: District established
- Succeeded by: Spencer O. Fisher

Personal details
- Born: Herschel Harrison Hatch; February 17, 1837 Morrisville, New York, U.S.
- Died: November 30, 1920 (aged 83) Detroit, Michigan, U.S.
- Resting place: Elm Lawn Cemetery
- Party: Republican
- Education: Hamilton College

Herschel Harrison Hatch (February 17, 1837 – November 30, 1920) was an American politician and lawyer who served one term as a member of the United States House of Representatives from Michigan's 10th congressional district from 1883 to 1885.

== Biography ==
Hatch was born in Morrisville, New York, where he attended the common schools. He graduated from Hamilton College Law School in Clinton, New York, in 1857. He was admitted to the bar and practiced in Morrisville, 1858–1863. Hatch moved to Bay City, Michigan, where he was elected alderman of Bay City at its first organization in 1865. He was judge of probate of Bay County, 1868–1872, a member of the constitutional commission of Michigan in 1873, and a member of the tax commission in 1881.

=== Family ===
He was a descendant of John Lothropp (also Lothrop or Lathrop, born Etton, Yorkshire, 1584; died 1653) was an English Anglican clergyman, who became a Congregationalist minister and emigrant to New England. He was the founder of Barnstable, Massachusetts.

=== Congress ===
Hatch was elected as a Republican to the 48th United States Congress, becoming the first to represent Michigan's 10th congressional district, and served from March 4, 1883, to March 4, 1885, in the U.S. House.

Hatch declined to be a candidate for renomination in 1884 and resumed the practice of law.

=== Retirement and death ===
Herschel H. Hatch moved to Detroit in 1895 and practiced law until 1910, when he retired. After ten years of retirement, he died in Detroit at the age of eighty-seven and is interred in Elm Lawn Cemetery of Bay City.

U.S. House of Representatives
Preceded by None	United States Representative for the 10th congressional district of Michigan; 1883 – 1885	Succeeded by Spencer O. Fisher
