= Marvin H. Chamberlain =

American politician

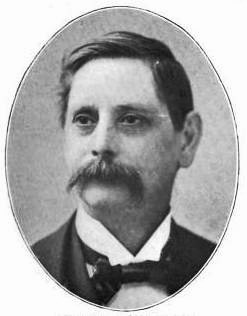

Mayor of Detroit
- In office 1886–1887
- Preceded by: Stephen Benedict Grummond
- Succeeded by: John Pridgeon, Jr.

Personal details
- Born: November 5, 1842 Woodstock Township, Michigan, U.S.
- Died: 1923 (aged 80–81)
- Spouse: Ellen Wilson (m. 1876)

Marvin H. Chamberlain (November 5, 1842 – 1923) was an American politician who was the mayor of Detroit from 1886 to 1887.

== Biography ==
Chamberlain was born in Woodstock Township, Michigan in Lenawee County on November 5, 1842, the son of Philonzo Chamberlain. He attended the district school until the age of 15; in 1859-60 he taught school in Lenawee County, and in 1860 entered Hillsdale College. After leaving Hillsdale, he taught school in Oakland County, and in 1864 moved to Detroit where he attended a commercial college.

After leaving college in 1865, Chamberlain began work for a wholesale liquor company F. A. Stokes, first as a bookkeeper and then as a travelling salesman. In 1867, Chamberlain formed a partnership with his brother and bought out Stokes; the brothers renamed the company M. H. Chamberlain & Co. The firm reaped profits immediately, and in 1873 the Chamberlains organized the Fearless Tobacco Co. The next year, Marvin Chamberlain helped organize the Commercial Traveler's Association of Michigan, and was elected its first president. In 1876 he sold his share in Fearless to his brother. Chamberlain expanded his business interests, and was one of the original directors of the Central Savings Bank.

In 1898, Chamberlain patented a "liquid separating process" for reduction of garbage, and received the contract to collect garbage in Detroit under the company name of Detroit Liquid Separating Co. He later built similar plants in other cities.

In 1882, Chamberlain was elected to the Detroit City Council, and in 1885 served as Council president. He ran for mayor on the Democratic ticket in 1883 and was defeated, but prevailed 1885 and served as mayor in 1886–1887. Chamberlain was a delegate to the 1888 Democratic National Convention.

Chamberlain was married in 1876 to Ellen Wilson of Niagara County, New York.

Chamberlain died in 1923.

Political offices
Preceded by Stephen Benedict Grummond	Mayor of Detroit; 1886–1887	Succeeded by John Pridgeon, Jr.
