= Stephen Benedict Grummond =

American politician

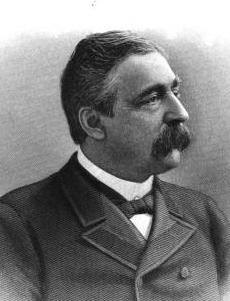

Mayor of Detroit
- In office 1884–1885
- Preceded by: William G. Thompson
- Succeeded by: Marvin H. Chamberlain

Personal details
- Born: September 18, 1834 Marine City, Michigan, U.S.
- Died: January 2, 1894 (aged 59) Detroit, Michigan, U.S.
- Spouse: Louisa Bangs Prouty (m. 1861)
- Children: 11

Stephen Benedict Grummond (September 18, 1834 – January 2, 1894) was an American politician, shipowner and marine industrialist who was the mayor of Detroit from 1884 to 1885.

== Early life and business ==
Stephen Benedict Grummond was born on September 18, 1834, in Marine City, Michigan, the son of Stephen Benedict and Mary Harrow Grummond. The elder Grummond was a successful businessman who ran a general store in Marine City.

Starting at age 15, the younger Grummond served on merchant ships in the summer and continued his schooling during the winter months. Using his savings and some investment from his father, Grummond purchased a merchant vessel of his own and sailed her for several years. In 1855, he sold his first vessel, moved to Detroit, and purchased another; Grummond continued in the business of buying, selling, and operating various vessels. He established Grummond's Mackinac Line of steamers, and at one time owned the largest tug and wrecking business on the Great Lakes. He built up a great fortune, much of it in the tugging business, and expanded into barges, lumber, and Detroit real estate.

== Politics and personal life ==
Grummond was originally a Democrat, but joined the Republican Party when it was established. In 1879, he was elected a member of the Board of Estimates, and in 1881 was elected to the City Council. Two years later he was elected as mayor of Detroit in a close race, and served in that capacity in 1884–1885. Grummond ran again for a second term, and was narrowly defeated by Marvin H. Chamberlain.

In 1861, Grummond married Louisa B. Prouty; the couple had eleven children, seven of whom lived to adulthood: Mrs. Marie Graves, Nathaniel P. Grummond, U. Grant Grummond, Edith Grummond, and Edna Ora Grummond.

Stephen Benedict Grummond died at his home on January 2, 1894.

Political offices
Preceded by William G. Thompson	Mayor of Detroit; 1884–1885	Succeeded by Marvin H. Chamberlain
