= Michigan's 10th congressional district =

U.S. House district for Michigan

Coordinates: 43°27′21″N 82°52′57″W

- Interactive map of district boundaries since January 3, 2023
- Representative: John James; R–Shelby Charter Township
- Population (2025): 774,943
- Median household income: $79,813
- Ethnicity: 72.8% White; 13.3% Black; 6.1% Asian; 4.3% Two or more races; 3.0% Hispanic; 0.6% other
- Cook PVI: R+3

Michigan's 10th congressional district is a United States congressional district in the Lower Peninsula of Michigan. It consists of southern Macomb County, Rochester and Rochester Hills in Oakland County.

District boundaries were redrawn in 1992, 2002, 2012, and 2022 due to reapportionment following the censuses of 1990, 2000, 2010, and 2020.

The current district is considered quite competitive. Southern Macomb County tends to support Democratic candidates, while central Macomb County and Rochester/Rochester Hills tend to be more moderate to slightly Republican. From 2021 to 2022, Lisa McClain represented the 10th; after redistricting moved McClain to the neighboring 9th district, John E. James was elected to represent it since 2023.

== Counties and municipalities ==
For the 118th and successive Congresses (based on redistricting following the 2020 census), the district contains all or portions of the following counties and municipalities:

Macomb County (14)

Center Line, Clinton Charter Township, Eastpointe, Fraser, Harrison Charter Township, Macomb Township (part; also 9th), Mount Clemens, Roseville, Shelby Charter Township, Sterling Heights, St. Clair Shores, Utica, Village of Grosse Pointe Shores (part; also 13th; shared with Wayne County), Warren

Oakland County (2)

Rochester, Rochester Hills

== Recent election results from statewide races ==
| Year | Office | Results |
|---|---|---|
| 2008 | President | Obama 54% - 44% |
| 2012 | President | Obama 53% - 47% |
| 2014 | Senate | Peters 55% - 41% |
| 2014 | Governor | Snyder 54% - 44% |
| 2014 | Secretary of State | Johnson 57% - 40% |
| 2014 | Attorney General | Schuette 54% - 43% |
| 2016 | President | Trump 50% - 45% |
| 2018 | Senate | Stabenow 53% - 46% |
| 2018 | Governor | Whitmer 53% - 44% |
| 2018 | Attorney General | Nessel 49% - 47% |
| 2020 | President | Trump 50% - 49% |
| 2020 | Senate | Peters 49.3% - 48.6% |
| 2022 | Governor | Whitmer 55% - 43% |
| 2022 | Secretary of State | Benson 58% - 40% |
| 2022 | Attorney General | Nessel 54% - 44% |
| 2024 | President | Trump 52% - 46% |
| 2024 | Senate | Rogers 50% - 47% |

== History ==
From 1992 to 2002 the 10th congressional district included St. Clair County, and slightly more than half of Macomb Counties population, but lacking the cities of Sterling Heights, Michigan and Warren, Michigan. In the 2002 redistricting Lapeer County, Huron County, Sanilac County and about two thirds of Sterling Heights were added to the district. At the same time Clinton Township, Mt. Clemens, St. Clair Shores, Fraser and Roseville were removed from the district.

Prior to the 1992 redistricting the 10th district had its largest city as Midland and roughly corresponded to the present 4th district. The post-1992 10th district was very similar to the previous 12th district, although it took small areas from the 18th district, the 14th district and the 8th district, and lost north-west Warren to the new 12th district.

== List of members representing the district ==
| Member | Party | Years | Cong ress | Electoral history | District location |
|---|---|---|---|---|---|
District created March 4, 1883
| Herschel H. Hatch (Bay City) | Republican | March 4, 1883 – March 3, 1885 | 48th | Elected in 1882. Retired. | 1883–1893 [data missing] |
| Spencer O. Fisher (West Bay City) | Democratic | March 4, 1885 – March 3, 1889 | 49th 50th | Elected in 1884. Re-elected in 1886. Lost re-election. | 1883–1893 [data missing] |
| Frank W. Wheeler (West Bay City) | Republican | March 4, 1889 – March 3, 1891 | 51st | Elected in 1888. Retired. | 1883–1893 [data missing] |
| Thomas A. E. Weadock (Bay City) | Democratic | March 4, 1891 – March 3, 1895 | 52nd 53rd | Elected in 1890. Re-elected in 1892. Retired. | 1883–1893 [data missing] |
| Thomas A. E. Weadock (Bay City) | Democratic | March 4, 1891 – March 3, 1895 | 52nd 53rd | Elected in 1890. Re-elected in 1892. Retired. | 1893–1903 [data missing] |
| Rousseau O. Crump (West Bay City) | Republican | March 4, 1895 – May 1, 1901 | 54th 55th 56th 57th | Elected in 1894. Re-elected in 1896. Re-elected in 1898. Re-elected in 1900. Died. | 1893–1903 [data missing] |
| Vacant | | May 1, 1901 – October 15, 1901 | 57th | | 1893–1903 [data missing] |
| Henry H. Aplin (West Bay City) | Republican | October 15, 1901 – March 3, 1903 | 57th | Elected to finish Crump's term. Lost renomination. | 1893–1903 [data missing] |
| George A. Loud (Au Sable) | Republican | March 4, 1903 – March 3, 1913 | 58th 59th 60th 61st 62nd | Elected in 1902. Re-elected in 1904. Re-elected in 1906. Re-elected in 1908. Re-elected in 1910. Lost re-election. | 1903–1913 [data missing] |
| Roy O. Woodruff (Bay City) | Progressive | March 4, 1913 – March 3, 1915 | 63rd | Elected in 1912. Lost re-election. | 1913–1933 [data missing] |
| George A. Loud (Bay City) | Republican | March 4, 1915 – March 3, 1917 | 64th | Elected in 1914. Lost renomination. | 1913–1933 [data missing] |
| Gilbert A. Currie (Midland) | Republican | March 4, 1917 – March 3, 1921 | 65th 66th | Elected in 1916. Re-elected in 1918. Lost renomination. | 1913–1933 [data missing] |
| Roy O. Woodruff (Bay City) | Republican | March 4, 1921 – January 3, 1953 | 67th 68th 69th 70th 71st 72nd 73rd 74th 75th 76th 77th 78th 79th 80th 81st 82nd | Elected in 1920. Re-elected in 1922. Re-elected in 1924. Re-elected in 1926. Re-elected in 1928. Re-elected in 1930. Re-elected in 1932. Re-elected in 1934. Re-elected in 1936. Re-elected in 1938. Re-elected in 1940. Re-elected in 1942. Re-elected in 1944. Re-elected in 1946. Re-elected in 1948. Re-elected in 1950. Retired. | 1913–1933 [data missing] |
| Roy O. Woodruff (Bay City) | Republican | March 4, 1921 – January 3, 1953 | 67th 68th 69th 70th 71st 72nd 73rd 74th 75th 76th 77th 78th 79th 80th 81st 82nd | Elected in 1920. Re-elected in 1922. Re-elected in 1924. Re-elected in 1926. Re-elected in 1928. Re-elected in 1930. Re-elected in 1932. Re-elected in 1934. Re-elected in 1936. Re-elected in 1938. Re-elected in 1940. Re-elected in 1942. Re-elected in 1944. Re-elected in 1946. Re-elected in 1948. Re-elected in 1950. Retired. | 1933–1943 [data missing] |
| Roy O. Woodruff (Bay City) | Republican | March 4, 1921 – January 3, 1953 | 67th 68th 69th 70th 71st 72nd 73rd 74th 75th 76th 77th 78th 79th 80th 81st 82nd | Elected in 1920. Re-elected in 1922. Re-elected in 1924. Re-elected in 1926. Re-elected in 1928. Re-elected in 1930. Re-elected in 1932. Re-elected in 1934. Re-elected in 1936. Re-elected in 1938. Re-elected in 1940. Re-elected in 1942. Re-elected in 1944. Re-elected in 1946. Re-elected in 1948. Re-elected in 1950. Retired. | 1943–1953 [data missing] |
| Elford Cederberg (Midland) | Republican | January 3, 1953 – December 31, 1978 | 83rd 84th 85th 86th 87th 88th 89th 90th 91st 92nd 93rd 94th 95th | Elected in 1952. Re-elected in 1954. Re-elected in 1956. Re-elected in 1958. Re-elected in 1960. Re-elected in 1962. Re-elected in 1964. Re-elected in 1966. Re-elected in 1968. Re-elected in 1970. Re-elected in 1972. Re-elected in 1974. Re-elected in 1976. Lost re-election and resigned early. | 1953–1963 [data missing] |
| Elford Cederberg (Midland) | Republican | January 3, 1953 – December 31, 1978 | 83rd 84th 85th 86th 87th 88th 89th 90th 91st 92nd 93rd 94th 95th | Elected in 1952. Re-elected in 1954. Re-elected in 1956. Re-elected in 1958. Re-elected in 1960. Re-elected in 1962. Re-elected in 1964. Re-elected in 1966. Re-elected in 1968. Re-elected in 1970. Re-elected in 1972. Re-elected in 1974. Re-elected in 1976. Lost re-election and resigned early. | 1963–1973 [data missing] |
| Elford Cederberg (Midland) | Republican | January 3, 1953 – December 31, 1978 | 83rd 84th 85th 86th 87th 88th 89th 90th 91st 92nd 93rd 94th 95th | Elected in 1952. Re-elected in 1954. Re-elected in 1956. Re-elected in 1958. Re-elected in 1960. Re-elected in 1962. Re-elected in 1964. Re-elected in 1966. Re-elected in 1968. Re-elected in 1970. Re-elected in 1972. Re-elected in 1974. Re-elected in 1976. Lost re-election and resigned early. | 1973–1983 [data missing] |
| Vacant | | December 31, 1978 – January 3, 1979 | 96th | | 1973–1983 [data missing] |
| Donald J. Albosta (St. Charles) | Democratic | January 3, 1979 – January 3, 1985 | 96th 97th 98th | Elected in 1978. Re-elected in 1980. Re-elected in 1982. Lost re-election. | 1973–1983 [data missing] |
| Donald J. Albosta (St. Charles) | Democratic | January 3, 1979 – January 3, 1985 | 96th 97th 98th | Elected in 1978. Re-elected in 1980. Re-elected in 1982. Lost re-election. | 1983–1993 [data missing] |
| Bill Schuette (Sanford) | Republican | January 3, 1985 – January 3, 1991 | 99th 100th 101st | Elected in 1984. Re-elected in 1986. Re-elected in 1988. Retired to run for U.S. Senator. | 1983–1993 [data missing] |
| Dave Camp (Midland) | Republican | January 3, 1991 – January 3, 1993 | 102nd | Elected in 1990. Redistricted to the 4th district. | 1983–1993 [data missing] |
| David Bonior (Mount Clemens) | Democratic | January 3, 1993 – January 3, 2003 | 103rd 104th 105th 106th 107th | Redistricted from the 12th district and re-elected in 1992. Re-elected in 1994. Re-elected in 1996. Re-elected in 1998. Re-elected in 2000. Redistricted to the 12th district and retired to run for Governor of Michigan. | 1993–2003 |
| Candice Miller (Harrison Township) | Republican | January 3, 2003 – December 31, 2016 | 108th 109th 110th 111th 112th 113th 114th | Elected in 2002. Re-elected in 2004. Re-elected in 2006. Re-elected in 2008. Re-elected in 2010. Re-elected in 2012. Re-elected in 2014. Retired and then resigned when elected Macomb County Public Works Commissioner. | 2003–2013 |
| Candice Miller (Harrison Township) | Republican | January 3, 2003 – December 31, 2016 | 108th 109th 110th 111th 112th 113th 114th | Elected in 2002. Re-elected in 2004. Re-elected in 2006. Re-elected in 2008. Re-elected in 2010. Re-elected in 2012. Re-elected in 2014. Retired and then resigned when elected Macomb County Public Works Commissioner. | 2013–2023 |
| Vacant | | December 31, 2016 – January 3, 2017 | 114th | | 2013–2023 |
| Paul Mitchell (Washington) | Republican | January 3, 2017 – December 14, 2020 | 115th 116th | Elected in 2016. Re-elected in 2018. Retired. | 2013–2023 |
| Paul Mitchell (Washington) | Independent | December 14, 2020 – January 3, 2021 | 115th 116th | Elected in 2016. Re-elected in 2018. Retired. | 2013–2023 |
| Lisa McClain (Romeo) | Republican | January 3, 2021 – January 3, 2023 | 117th | Elected in 2020. Redistricted to the 9th district. | 2013–2023 |
| John James (Shelby Charter Township) | Republican | January 3, 2023 – present | 118th 119th | Elected in 2022. Re-elected in 2024. Retired to run for governor of Michigan. | 2023–present |
| Christina Hines (Royal Oak) | Democratic | Assuming office on January 3, 2027 | | Elected in 2026. | 2023–present |

== Recent election results ==
=== 2012 ===
Michigan's 10th congressional district, 2012
| Party | Candidate | Votes | % |
|---|---|---|---|
| Republican | Candice Miller (incumbent) | 226,075 | 68.8 |
| Democratic | Chuck Stadler | 97,734 | 29.7 |
| Libertarian | Bhagwan Dashairya | 4,803 | 1.5 |
| Total votes | | 328,612 | 100.0 |
| Republican hold | | | |

=== 2014 ===
Michigan's 10th congressional district, 2014
| Party | Candidate | Votes | % |
|---|---|---|---|
| Republican | Candice Miller (incumbent) | 157,069 | 68.7 |
| Democratic | Chuck Stadler | 67,143 | 29.3 |
| Green | Harley Mikkelson | 4,480 | 2.0 |
| Total votes | | 228,692 | 100.0 |
| Republican hold | | | |

=== 2016 ===
Michigan's 10th congressional district, 2016
| Party | Candidate | Votes | % |
|---|---|---|---|
| Republican | Paul Mitchell | 215,132 | 63.1 |
| Democratic | Frank Accavitti Jr. | 110,112 | 32.3 |
| Libertarian | Lisa Lane Gioia | 10,612 | 3.1 |
| Green | Benjamin Nofs | 5,127 | 1.5 |
| Total votes | | 340,983 | 100.0 |
| Republican hold | | | |

=== 2018 ===
Michigan's 10th congressional district, 2018
| Party | Candidate | Votes | % |
|---|---|---|---|
| Republican | Paul Mitchell (incumbent) | 182,808 | 60.8 |
| Democratic | Kimberly Bizon | 106,061 | 35.0 |
| Independent | Jeremy Peruski | 11,344 | 3.7 |
| Green | Harley Mikkelson | 2,851 | 0.9 |
| Total votes | | 303,064 | 100.0 |
| Republican hold | | | |

=== 2020 ===
Michigan's 10th congressional district, 2020
| Party | Candidate | Votes | % |
|---|---|---|---|
| Republican | Lisa McClain | 271,607 | 66.3 |
| Democratic | Kimberly Bizon | 138,179 | 33.7 |
| Total votes | | 409,786 | 100.0 |
| Republican hold | | | |

=== 2022 ===
Michigan's 10th congressional district, 2022
| Party | Candidate | Votes | % |
|---|---|---|---|
| Republican | John James | 159,202 | 48.8 |
| Democratic | Carl Marlinga | 157,602 | 48.3 |
| Working Class | Andrea Kirby | 5,905 | 1.8 |
| Libertarian | Mike Saliba | 3,524 | 1.0 |
| Write-in | | 4 | 0.0 |
| Total votes | | 326,237 | 100.0 |
| Republican hold | | | |

=== 2024 ===
Michigan's 10th congressional district, 2024
| Party | Candidate | Votes | % |
|---|---|---|---|
| Republican | John James (incumbent) | 217,437 | 51.1 |
| Democratic | Carl Marlinga | 191,363 | 45.0 |
| Working Class | Andrea Kirby | 11,162 | 2.6 |
| Libertarian | Mike Saliba | 5,339 | 1.3 |
| Total votes | | 425,301 | 100.0 |
| Republican hold | | | |

== See also ==
- Michigan's congressional districts
- List of United States congressional districts
