= Rebecca Shelley =

Rebecca Shelley Rathmer
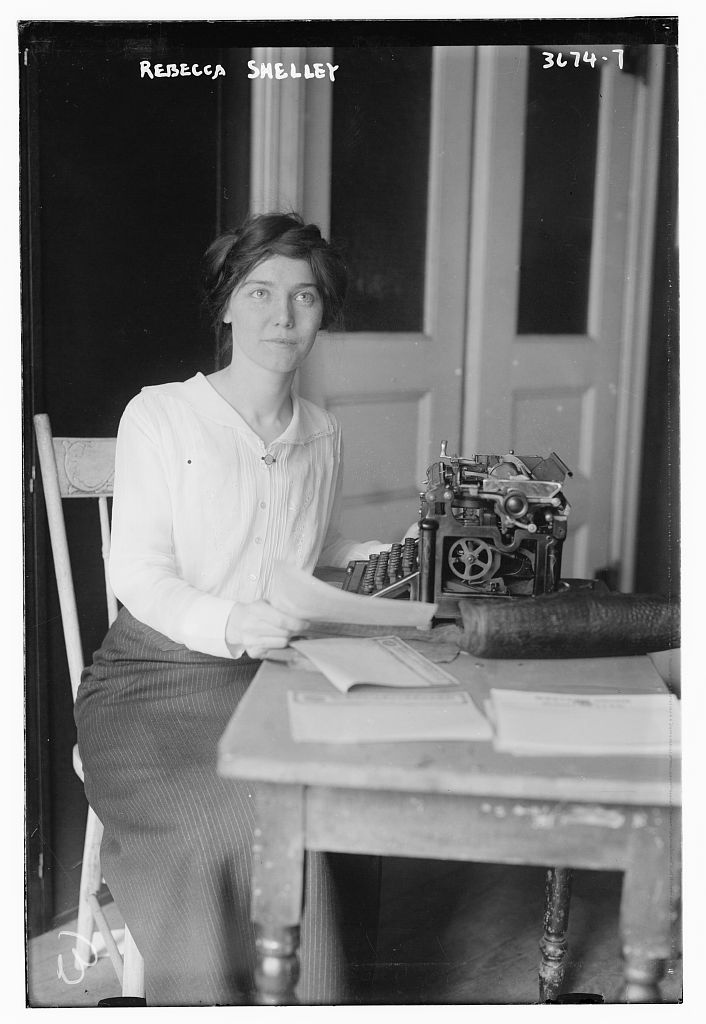
- Shelley in 1915
- Born: Rebecca Shelley; October 20, 1887; Sugar Valley, Pennsylvania
- Died: January 21, 1984 (aged 97); Leila Y. Post Montgomery Hospital; Battle Creek, Michigan
- Education: University of Michigan
- Spouse: Felix Martin Rathmer

Rebecca Shelley (January 20, 1887 – January 21, 1984) was a pacifist who lost her American citizenship when she married a German national. She was the publisher of Modern Poultry Breeder.

== Biography ==
She was born as Rebecca Shelley in Sugar Valley, Pennsylvania on January 20, 1887, to William Alfred Shelly. She attended the Normal School in Clarion, Pennsylvania. In 1904 her family moved to Michigan. In 1907 she attended University of Michigan and majored in German. She graduated Phi Beta Kappa in 1910.

In 1922 she married Felix Martin Rathmer, a German born electrical engineer and she lost her American citizenship. She refused to take the naturalization oath because it contained the phrase "bear arms in defense of the country". She did not regain her citizenship until 1944. She became a widow in 1959.

She died on January 21, 1984, at the Leila Y. Post Montgomery Hospital in Battle Creek, Michigan.
