= Seth C. Moffatt =

American politician

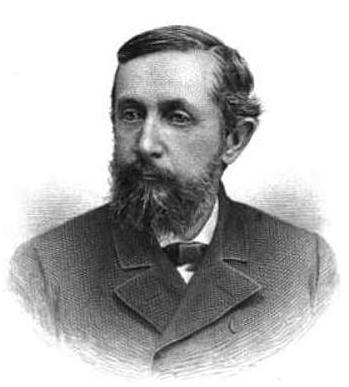

Member of the U.S. House of Representatives from Michigan's 11th district
- In office March 4, 1885 – December 22, 1887
- Preceded by: Edward Breitung
- Succeeded by: Henry W. Seymour

29th Speaker of the Michigan House of Representatives
- In office 1881–1882
- Preceded by: John T. Rich
- Succeeded by: Sumner Howard

Member of the Michigan House of Representatives from the Grand Traverse district
- In office 1881–1882
- Preceded by: Henry F. May
- Succeeded by: David Vinton, Jr.

Member of the Michigan Senate from the 31st district
- In office 1871–1872
- Preceded by: J. H. Standish
- Succeeded by: William H. C. Mitchell

Personal details
- Born: Seth Crittenden Moffatt; August 10, 1841 Battle Creek, Michigan
- Died: December 22, 1887 (aged 46) Washington, D.C.
- Resting place: Oakwood Cemetery, Traverse City, Michigan
- Party: Republican

Seth Crittenden Moffatt (August 10, 1841 – December 22, 1887) was a politician from the U.S. state of Michigan.

Moffatt was born in Battle Creek, Michigan, attended the common schools, and graduated from the law department of the University of Michigan at Ann Arbor in 1863. He was admitted to the bar and commenced practice in Traverse City, Michigan. He served as prosecuting attorney for Grand Traverse and Leelanau Counties for ten years.

Moffatt was also a member of the Michigan Senate (31st District) in 1871 and 1872 and a member of the constitutional commission (9th District) in 1873, then register of the United States Land Office at Traverse City 1874–1878. He served as a member of the Michigan House of Representatives from Grand Traverse District in 1881 and 1882, and served as speaker in both terms. He was also a delegate to the Republican National Convention in 1884.

In 1884, Moffatt was elected as a Republican from Michigan's 11th congressional district to the 49th Congress. He was re-elected in 1886 to the 50th Congress, serving from March 4, 1885, until his death at the age of forty-six in Washington, D.C. Henry W. Seymour was elected on February 14, 1888, to fill the vacancy caused by his death.

Seth Moffatt was a resident of Northport and is interred at Oakwood Cemetery of Traverse City.

== See also ==
- List of members of the United States Congress who died in office (1790–1899)

U.S. House of Representatives
Preceded by Edward Breitung	United States Representative for the 11th congressional district of Michigan; 1885 – 1887	Succeeded by Henry W. Seymour
