= Elm Lawn Cemetery =

Historic cemetery in Bay County, Michigan

- U.S. National Register of Historic Places
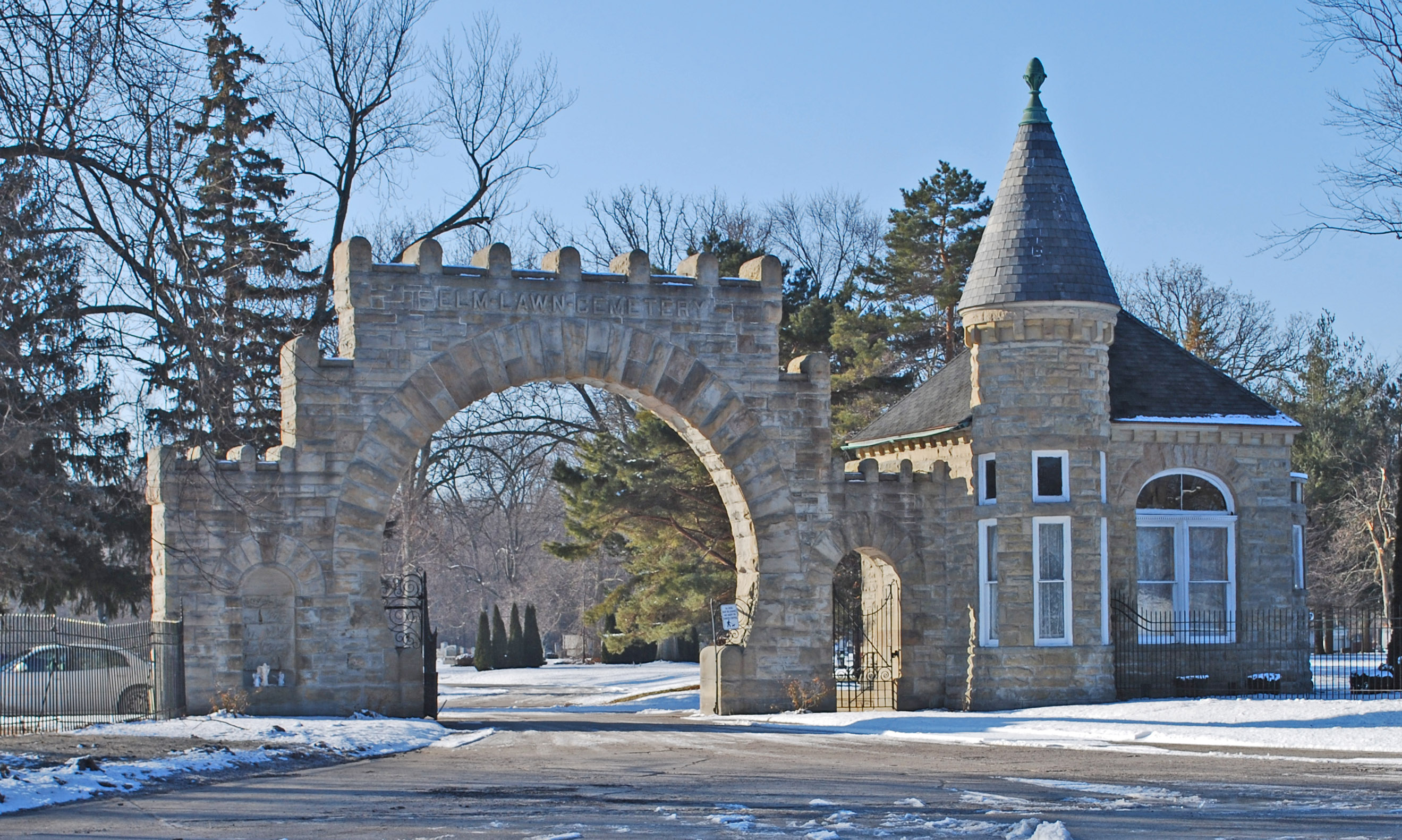
- Elm Lawn Cemetery Gate

- Location within Michigan Location within the United States
- Interactive map
- Location: 300 Ridge Rd., Bay City, Michigan
- Coordinates: 43°35′19″N 83°51′29″W
- Area: 60 acres (24 ha)
- Built: 1891
- Architect: Mason L. Brown, Pratt & Koeppe
- Architectural style: Romanesque, Classical Revival
- NRHP reference No.: 06000404
- Added to NRHP: May 18, 2006

Elm Lawn Cemetery is a cemetery located at 300 Ridge Road in Bay City, Michigan. It was listed on the National Register of Historic Places in 2006.

== History ==
By the late 1880s, the cemeteries already established in Bay City were becoming filled. In 1890, a group of Bay City businessmen formed an association for the purpose of establishing a new cemetery. Property was acquired, and by early 1891, landscape architect Mason L. Brown of Detroit had nearly completed a plan of the grounds. Work on the grounds started in the spring. By October 1891, work had proceeded far enough that the first interment took place. Pratt & Koeppe of Bay City designed the gatehouse and chapel, and work on these structures began in late 1891 and was completed in 1892. Although some grading of the site was left, the construction work was essentially complete at the end of 1892. After the main construction was completed, the landscaping was installed, with the trees already on the site supplemented with other plantings.

As the cemetery became more popular, families with means began constructing mausoleums on the site, with the first one installed by the family of John F. Eddy in 1899, and the last by the Van Haaren family in 1948.

The cemetery is still active and approximately forty burials are performed annually. As of 2018, the cemetery is owned by the Midwest Memorial Group.

== Description ==
The cemetery covers 60 acres of flat terrain, with a central access roadway and curving roads to either side. There are about 13,000 burials in the cemetery, with space for about 5000 more. The foliage on site includes a large variety of shade trees (beech, cedar, maple, oak and pine) along various ornamental trees and shrubs, including catalpa, hawthorn, purple plum, redbud, lilac, sandcherry, spirea and dogwood. The earliest burials are in the rear section of the cemetery, and many sections along the front remain undeveloped today. A number of mausoleums dot the cemetery

The entrance to the cemetery is through an arched stone gateway with attached gatehouse. The structure has a Richardsonian Romanesque feel and is 18 by 22 feet with a small tower extending above the roofline. The gatehouse building contains two rooms: A main room, used as the cemetery office, and a small bathroom. The attached gateway extends 47 feet and in 35 feet high.

A Richardsonian Romanesque chapel is also on the grounds. The chapel is a one-story buff sandstone structure approximately thirty feet square, with a hip roof clad in slate. A series of steps leads upward to the entrance. The chapel inside contains eight oak pews, four to a side around a center aisle. The basement contains a vault.
