= Edward Breitung =

American politician (1831–1887)

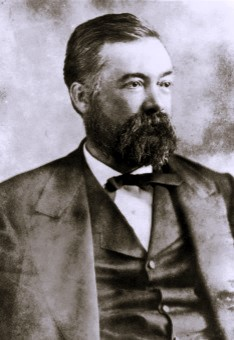

Member of the U.S. House of Representatives from Michigan's 11th district
- In office March 4, 1883 – March 3, 1885
- Preceded by: District established
- Succeeded by: Seth C. Moffatt

Personal details
- Born: November 10, 1831 Schalkau, Saxe-Meiningen
- Died: March 3, 1887 (aged 55) Eastman, Georgia, U.S.
- Resting place: Breitung Mausoleum at Park Cemetery in Marquette, Michigan
- Party: Republican

Edward Breitung (November 10, 1831 – March 3, 1887) was a politician from the U.S. state of Michigan. He served one term in the United States House of Representatives from 1883 to 1885.

== Early life and career ==
Breitung, the son of John M. Breitung, a Lutheran minister, was born in the city of Schalkau in the Duchy of Saxe-Meiningen, Germany (now in Sonneberg District, Thuringia). He attended the College of Mining in Meiningen, then one of the celebrated schools in Germany for scientific and classical studies.

=== Business ===
In 1849, after the revolution in Germany, he immigrated to the United States and settled in Kalamazoo County, Michigan. He moved to Detroit in 1851 and became a clerk in a mercantile house. He moved to Marquette and engaged in mercantile pursuits until 1859, when he went to Negaunee. Here he was also engaged in the mercantile business; however, his store burnt in 1860.

After this, he ran the Pioneer Blast Furnace in Negaunee, with Israel Case, under a four-year contract. Subsequently, he engaged exclusively in iron-mining operations in 1864, explored for iron deposits in Marquette and Menominee Counties, locating several profitable mines from 1864 to 1867. He later became interested iron mining in Minnesota, and in gold and silver mining in Colorado.

=== Family ===
On November 28, 1870, Edward married Mary Paulin, who was originally from Belgium, Wisconsin. Mary had been working as a chambermaid at a boarding house in Republic (Smith's Mine), Michigan, where Edward owned the Republic Mine.

Edward and Mary's first child was Edward Jr., born on November 1, 1871, in Negaunee. Their second child, William, was born c. March 1874 in Negaunee, but became sick soon thereafter. Edward did not make it back from his Lansing duties before William's death, on August 26 of the same year, from cholera.

== Political career ==
Breitung was a member of the Michigan State House of Representatives in 1873 and 1874 and a member of the Michigan State Senate in 1877 and 1878. He served as mayor of Negaunee in 1879, 1880, and 1882.

=== Congress ===
He was elected as a Republican to the United States House of Representatives from Michigan's 11th congressional district for the Forty-eighth Congress, serving from March 4, 1883, to March 3, 1885. He declined to be a candidate for renomination in 1884.

== Death ==
Breitung died in Eastman, Georgia before he was able to move into a winter house he had built. This was also before construction was due to begin on his new house in Marquette, Michigan. He is interred in the Breitung Mausoleum at Park Cemetery in Marquette.

== Legacy ==
Breitung Township, Minnesota, is named after him for his work in developing the Soudan Mine there in the 1880s. Breitung Township, Michigan, is also named for him.

=== Family and descendants ===
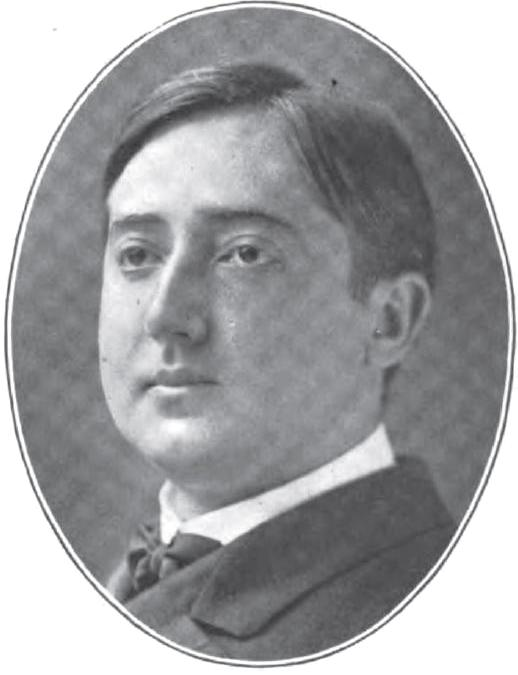
Edward N. Breitung Jr. (1904)

Edward Breitung's widow married into the Samuel R. Kaufman family of Marquette, marrying Samuel's son Nathan Kaufman. Mary had in fact placed Nathan in effective charge of several Breitung businesses while Edward was away in Congress.

Breitung's son, Edward N. Breitung Jr., continued his father's successful mining enterprises in the Upper Peninsula of Michigan and much further afield. Edward Jr. also married into the Kaufman family, wedding Nathan's sister Charlotte. Despite his father's political career, Edward Jr.'s loyalties were compromised with the outbreak of World War I. He attempted to profit through the questionable purchase of an impounded German ship. Later, his nephew, and others working in the Breitung New York office, served time for involvement in plots to bomb American factories and merchant ships.

Edward Jr. and Charlotte had one child: Juliet. Although Charlotte was grooming Juliet for New York's high society, she eloped with their Marquette neighbor's gardener, Max. Edward Jr. "gracefully" offered Max a chance to prove himself in a Breitung mine in New Mexico, where over the course of two months he faced nine life-threatening events. Coming back to New York, Max was attacked twice in the same evening, and left for dead.

U.S. House of Representatives
Preceded by None	United States Representative for the 11th congressional district of Michigan; 1883 – 1885	Succeeded by Seth C. Moffatt
