= West Bay City, Michigan =

Former city in Michigan, United States

- Former city
- Location within the state of Michigan
- Coordinates: 43°35′52″N 83°53′53″W
- Country: United States
- State: Michigan
- County: Bay
- Platted: 1857
- Incorporated: 1871 (village); 1877 (city)
- Disestablished: 1905
- Elevation: 584 ft (178 m)
- Time zone: UTC-5 (Eastern (EST))
  - Summer (DST): UTC-4 (EDT)
- GNIS feature ID: 2547458

West Bay City was a city in Bay County the U.S. state of Michigan. The city was formed from the communities of Banks, Salzburg, and Wenona. The city existed from 1877 to 1905 when it was merged with Bay City, Michigan.

== History ==
=== Bangor/Banks ===
Joseph Trombley in 1834 purchased Bangor Township's section 16 from the government which was the beginning of the Bangor settlement. In 1852 the first mill was built. Bangor was platted in 1857 by Joseph Trombley. The community of Bangor was served by the Banks Post Office which opened on May 18, 1864. The Banks Post Office was closed on May 1, 1866. Population reached 1,000 by 1868. On Nov 17, 1870, the Banks Post Office was reopened. In 1871, Bangor became an incorporated village, but there was already an existing incorporated Bangor, so the village was renamed as the Village of Banks.

=== Salzburg ===
Salzburg was platted in 1867 by F.H. Fitzhugh. Salzburg, also Salzburgh, Post Office was opened on March 19, 1869.

=== Wenona ===
Lake City was platted in 1863 by Henry W. Sage, of Sage McGraw & Company around a mill. The community was later renamed Wenona. The Michigan Central rail line was built north from community in 1871. By 1873, Wenona was served by a post office with the same name.

=== West Bay City ===
The City of West Bay City, also known as West Bank City, was formed in 1877 by the state legislature consolidating the communities of Banks, Salzburg, and Wenona. The Banks Post Office was finally closed on February 28, 1891. The Salzburg Post Office on November 30, 1894, was closed. In 1905, West Bay City merged into Bay City, Michigan.
