= James W. King =

James Wood King
- Born: August 13, 1842; Fabius, Michigan
- Died: October 9, 1903 (aged 61); Coldwater, Michigan
- Burial place: Riverside Cemetery, Three Rivers, Michigan
- Military career
- Allegiance: United States of America; Union
- Branch: United States Army; Union Army
- Service years: 1861–64
- Rank: Quartermaster Sergeant
- Unit: 11th Michigan Volunteer Infantry Regiment
- Conflicts: American Civil War: Battle of Stones River; Battle of Davis's Cross Roads; Battle of Chickamauga; Battle of Missionary Ridge; Atlanta campaign; Battle of Ruff's Station
- Other work: Clerk, newspaper editor, court stenographer

James Wood King (August 13, 1842 – October 9, 1903) was a soldier, government clerk, and newspaper editor from the state of Michigan who served in the Union Army during the American Civil War. He was resident in Tennessee for a time until he chose to leave to escape violent threats against his wife and child. He was nominated for the Medal of Honor for committing acts of conspicuous gallantry at the Battle of Missionary Ridge.

== Antebellum years ==
King was born in Fabius Township, Michigan. He was the sixth of eight children of Benjamin Montaigne and Martha (Wetherbee) King. Martha King died in 1846, and Benjamin remarried to Eliza Van Buren, a cousin of U.S. president Martin Van Buren and descendant of John Jay.

King grew up working on his father's farm. In late 1860, he fell in love with Sarah Jane Babcock, a fellow student at the local district school. She was a daughter of Darius Ambrose and Ruth (Butler) Babcock, both of whom had ancestors in the Connecticut House of Representatives during the Revolution. King and Babcock’s young romance was interrupted when the Civil War broke out and King enlisted in the 11th Michigan Volunteer Infantry Regiment, mustering in on August 24, 1861.

== Civil War service ==
King was frequently detailed to clerk and quartermaster duties, culminating in his March 1863 promotion to quartermaster sergeant, a rank that nominally precluded involvement in combat. King, however, requested and was granted permission by his brigade commander to join in battle outside his line of duty at Missionary Ridge on November 25, 1863. There, King twice charged ahead of his unit against fortified Confederate positions, entering hand-to-hand combat on the first occasion, and penetrating a gap in Alexander P. Stewart's division on the ridge summit in the second case. King was among the first to crest the ridge, and the piercing of the Confederate battle line triggered Stewart’s retreat from the heights. King was wounded in the process, suffering a gunshot wound to his right arm that inflicted a lifelong disability and nearly necessitated amputation.

After voyaging to Michigan on medical furlough, King returned to his unit despite efforts to have him transferred to the Veteran Reserve Corps due to disability. When the regiment's colonel, William L. Stoughton, suffered amputation at the Battle of Ruff's Station on July 4, 1864, he asked for King to care for him during his recovery. King later returned to the fighting near Atlanta and was wounded again on July 30, 1864, when a chance shot from a distant Confederate cannon exploded over his head and severely injured his left shoulder. That wound, which would be blamed for his death decades later, effectively spelled the end of his military career.

== Reconstruction Era ==
Physically unable to resume farming, King departed for Tennessee to work as a clerk in the Chattanooga quartermaster office of Ezra Benham Kirk in 1865, travelling back to Michigan briefly in October to marry Sarah Jane Babcock. In the following year, King partnered with the 11th Michigan’s former adjutant, Linus Truman Squire, to lease and run the cotton plantation of Jacob Critz Jr. in Thompson's Station, Tennessee. Crop failure brought financial disappointment, and led King to try his luck again at a plantation just south of Decatur, Alabama, in 1867. There, King was attacked by the Ku Klux Klan and moved back to Michigan at the end of the year to ensure the safety of his wife and toddler daughter Jennie May King.

== Career ==
After returning north, King worked as a clerk in the office of Michigan’s auditor general, William Humphrey, before leveraging his growing talent in phonography (a form of shorthand), to land a position as city editor of the Lansing Republican newspaper in 1871. King rose to the post of chief editor in 1881 and in the process became deeply involved in both state and federal politics. His stances on political issues were firmly, and at times radically, Republican, most notably in his championing of full racial equality. He retired from journalism in 1886 upon a change in the Republican’s ownership and returned to Fabius to care for his ageing parents. Reoccupying his childhood home, he secured employment as stenographer of the Fifteenth Judicial Circuit. King was elected president of the Law Stenographer’s Association of Michigan in 1898, and won reelection each year until his death.

== Medal of Honor nomination ==
In 1901 King was nominated by Senator Julius C. Burrows for the Medal of Honor for his actions at the Battle of Missionary Ridge. After significant delays in processing, this nomination was retroactively invalidated by a War Department circular of April 1903 that required nominees to be in current, active military service. This circular was overridden by an act of Congress the following year, but King did not live long enough to resume his efforts to obtain the medal.

== Family ==
The Kings had five children who survived to adulthood: Jennie May King (1867-1914), Herbert Holbrook King (1869-1950), James Guy King (1870-1919), John Willard King (1872-1931), and Henry Burr King (1876-after 1950). A sixth child, Eva Fay (1891-1894), died of Scarlet fever.

== Death ==
King died on October 9, 1903, four days before the War Department mailed out a letter announcing the rejection of his medal nomination. Testimony submitted for his wife's widow’s pension blamed his death on heart troubles that originated with his wounding at Atlanta almost forty years prior. King is buried in Riverside Cemetery in Three Rivers, Michigan.

== See also ==
- 11th Michigan Volunteer Infantry Regiment
- Michigan in the American Civil War
