= Fernando C. Beaman =

American politician (1814–1882)

Fernando Cortez Beaman
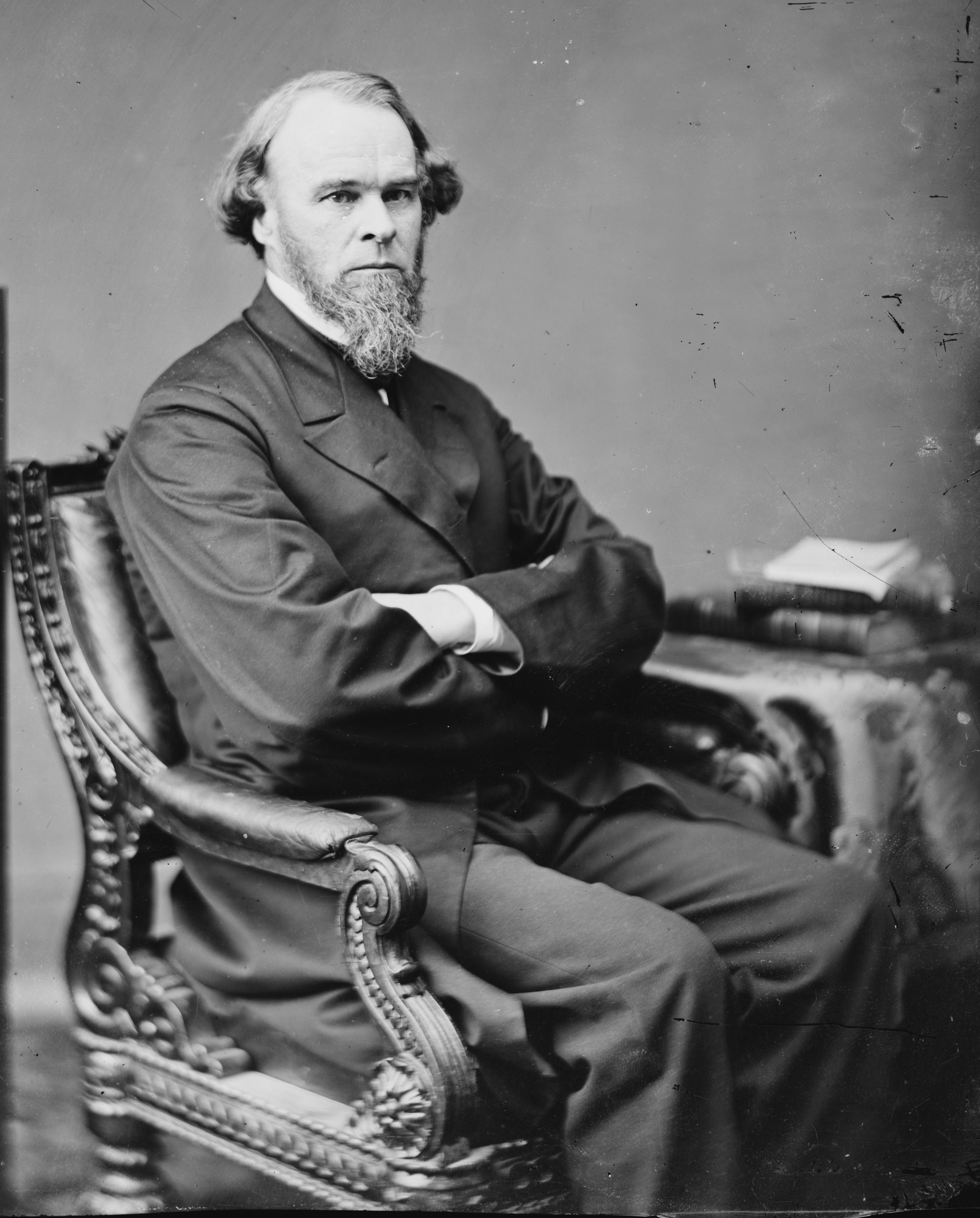

Member of the U.S. House of Representatives from Michigan
- In office March 4, 1861 – March 3, 1871
- Preceded by: Henry Waldron (2nd); Bradley F. Granger (1st)
- Succeeded by: Charles Upson (2nd); Henry Waldron (1st)
- Constituency: 2nd district (1861-63); 1st district (1863-71)

Personal details
- Born: June 28, 1814 Chester, Vermont, U.S.
- Died: September 27, 1882 (aged 68) Adrian, Michigan, U.S.
- Resting place: Oakwood Cemetery; Adrian, Michigan
- Party: Republican
- Spouse: Mary Goodrich Beaman
- Children: Mary A. Beaman; Edward C. Beaman; Roscoe W. Beaman
- Parent(s): Joshua Beaman; Hannah (Olcott) Beaman
- Education: Franklin Academy
- Profession: Teacher; Lawyer; Politician

Fernando Cortez Beaman (June 28, 1814 – September 27, 1882) was a teacher, lawyer and politician from Michigan during and after the American Civil War. He served as a member of the United States House of Representatives and as mayor of Adrian, Michigan.

== Early life ==
Beaman was born in Chester, Vermont, the son of Joshua Beaman and Hannah (Olcott) Beaman. He moved with his parents to a farm in Franklin County, New York, in 1819, and attended the district schools and Franklin Academy in Malone, New York. He taught school and moved to Rochester, New York, in 1836, where he studied law.

== Career ==
He moved to Manchester, Michigan, in 1838, where he was admitted to the bar and commenced practice in 1839. In 1841, he moved to Tecumseh to practice law, then moved to Clinton. In 1843, he moved to Adrian, having been appointed prosecuting attorney for Lenawee County. He served in that position until 1850. In Adrian, he formed a law practice with Thomas M. Cooley, future Chief Justice of the Michigan Supreme Court.

He was the city attorney of Adrian and a member of the convention that organized the Republican Party "under the oaks" at Jackson in 1854. He was a delegate to the first Republican National Convention at Philadelphia in 1856, and was also mayor of Adrian in 1856 and judge of the probate court of Lenawee County from 1856 to 1860.

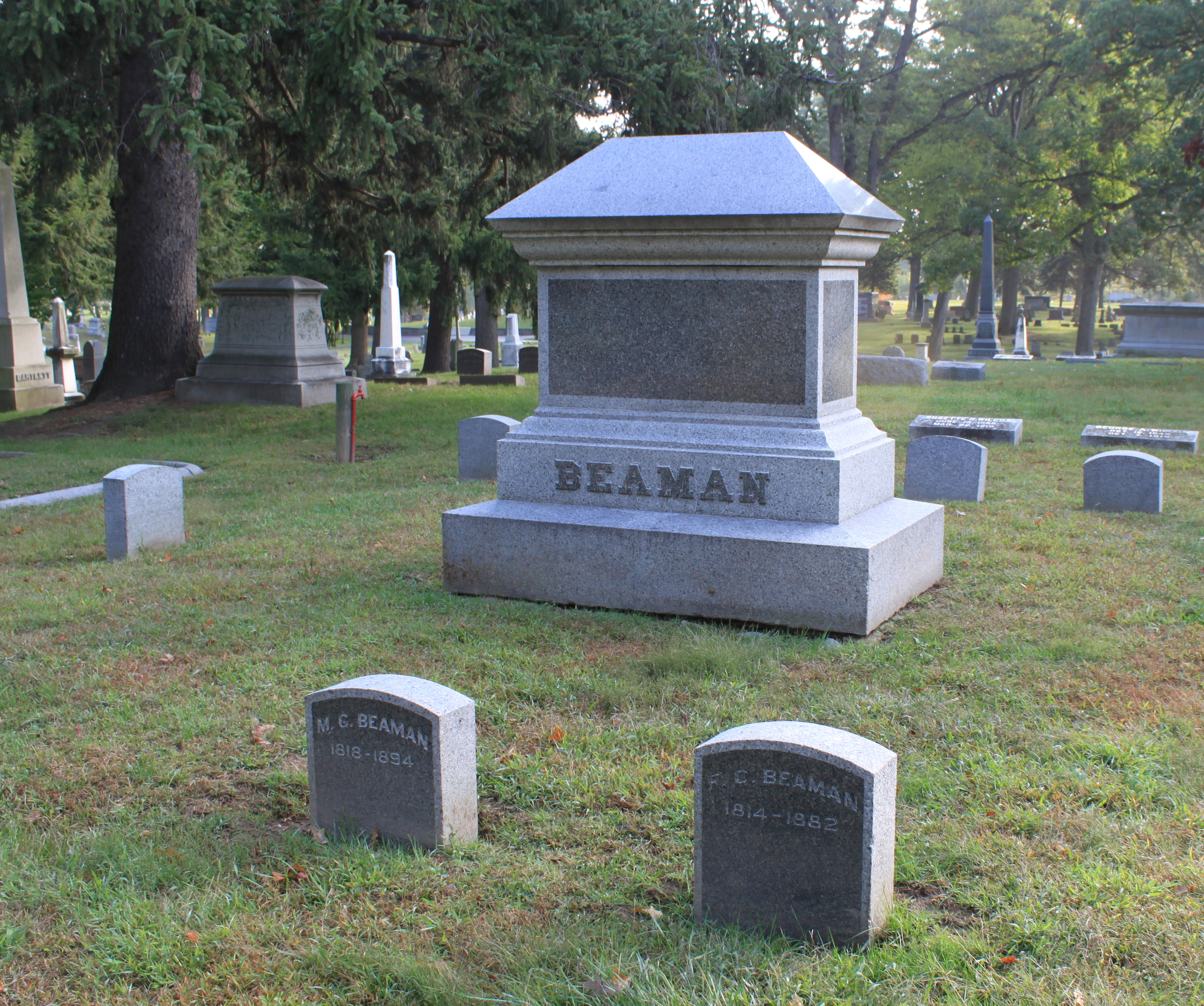
Beaman grave

Beaman was elected as a Republican candidate from Michigan's 2nd congressional district to the United States House of Representatives for the Thirty-seventh and to the four succeeding Congresses, serving from March 4, 1861, to March 3, 1871. Due to redistricting after the 1860 census, Beaman represented Michigan's 1st congressional district following the elections of 1862. During the Thirty-ninth Congress, he was chairman of the House Committee on Roads and Canals. He declined to be a candidate for renomination in 1870 and returned to Adrian where he resumed the practice of law.

Beaman was again appointed a judge of probate court of Lenawee County in 1871, and was then elected to the same position in 1872, and re-elected in 1876.

Due to ill health, Beaman declined appointment as United States Senator to fill the vacancy caused by the death of Zachariah Chandler in 1879. He also declined appointments to the Michigan Supreme Court and as United States Commissioner of Indian Affairs.

He died in Adrian on September 27, 1882, and is interred in Oakwood Cemetery there.

== Personal life ==
Beaman married Mary Goodrich on May 10, 1841, in Brockport, New York. They had three children: Mary A. Beaman, Edward C. Beaman, and Roscoe W. Beaman.

U.S. House of Representatives
Preceded by Henry Waldron	United States Representative for the 2nd congressional district of Michigan; 1861–1863	Succeeded by Charles Upson
Preceded by Bradley F. Granger	United States Representative for the 1st congressional district of Michigan; 1863–1871	Succeeded by Henry Waldron
