= Allgor–Barkalow Homestead =

- U.S. National Register of Historic Places
- New Jersey Register of Historic Places
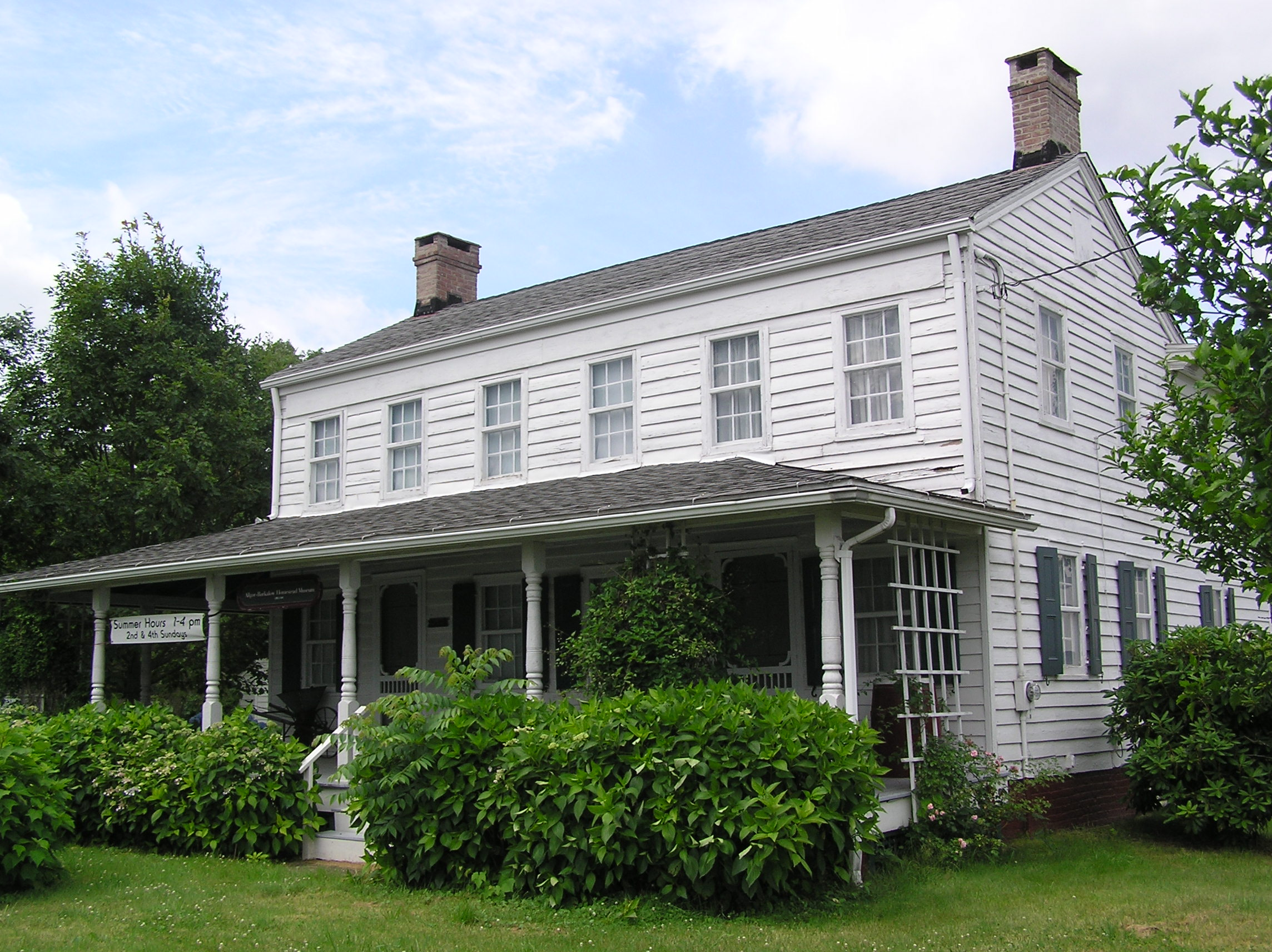

- Location within Monmouth County, New Jersey Location within New Jersey Location within the United States
- Location: New Bedford Road, Wall Township, New Jersey
- Coordinates: 40°10′30″N 74°03′52″W
- NRHP reference No.: 84002748
- NJRHP No.: 2072

Significant dates
- Added to NRHP: June 21, 1984
- Designated NJRHP: May 17, 1984

The Allgor–Barkalow Homestead is located on New Bedford Road in the New Bedford section of Wall Township in Monmouth County, New Jersey, United States. The historic farmhouse was added to the National Register of Historic Places on June 21, 1984, for its significance in agriculture, architecture, commerce, and exploration/settlement. It is now used by the Old Wall Historical Society.

== History and description ==
The house was built around 1843. One room was used as a general store by James L. Allgor (1821–1896), who purchased it from Jonathan Morris. After Allgor's death, the house was owned by Job S. Barkalow. Around 1890, the house was moved about 50 yards (46 m) south. The Barkalow family lived here until the 1960s. The Wall Township Board of Education took possession of the property in 1975.

== See also ==
- National Register of Historic Places listings in Monmouth County, New Jersey
