= William G. Whitney =

American Medal of Honor recipient (1840–1915)

William Garrett Whitney
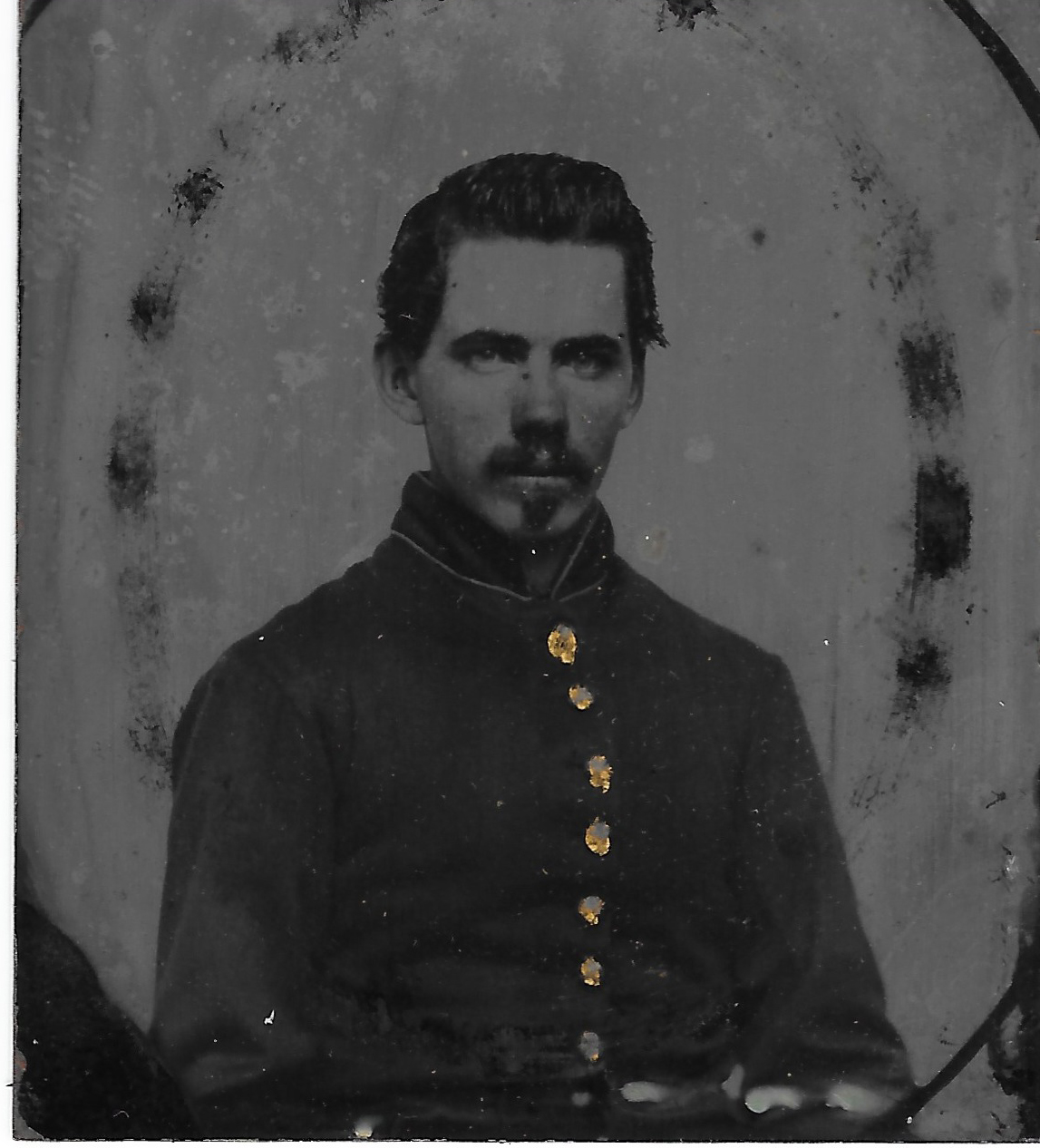
- Born: December 13, 1840; Allen, Michigan
- Died: May 7, 1915 (aged 74); Allen, Michigan
- Burial place: Allen, Michigan
- Military career
- Allegiance: United States of America
- Branch: United States Army
- Service years: 1861-1865
- Rank: Captain
- Units: Company B, 11th Michigan Infantry
- Conflicts: American Civil War
- Awards: Medal of Honor

William Garrett Whitney (December 13, 1840 – May 7, 1915) was an American Medal of Honor recipient who served in the Union Army during the American Civil War and was awarded for his actions during the Battle of Chickamauga. He served in Company B, 11th Michigan Infantry, enlisting August 24, 1861 as a sergeant. Whitney was 21 years old at the time of enlistment and was from Allen, Michigan. There were at least 53 men who served from Allen.

At the time of his enlistment he was also a student of Hillsdale College. Hillsdale College was founded in 1844 in Spring Arbor and was a strong proponent of abolitionism. Frederick Douglass even spoke on the campus of Hillsdale in January 1863.

Whitney mustered out September 16, 1865 in Nashville. He saw three promotions during his service: second lieutenant on January 7, 1863, first lieutenant on June 17, 1864, and captain on March 1, 1865.

== Biography ==
Whitney was born December 13, 1840, in Allen, Hillsdale County, Michigan. He died May 7, 1915, in Allen. He is buried in the Allen Cemetery in Allen, Michigan. He was married in 1874 to Elizabeth Hyland Marshall, who survived him after his death in 1915. The couple had four children including one boy, Frederic (born 1887).

Whitney was awarded (1895) the Medal of Honor for action on September 20, 1863, at the Battle of Chickamauga, Georgia. He was one of four Hillsdale College students to win the Medal of Honor during the American Civil War. Whitney was one of nine Union soldiers to be awarded the Medal of Honor for action at Chickamauga.

In Deeds of Valor (p. 269) Whitney tells of the action that resulted in his receiving the Medal of Honor:

"Noon of September 20, 1863, found our brigade- Stanley's-Negley's Division, Thomas' Corps, on Snodgrass Hill, a part of Missionary Ridge. We were about 120 yards east of the Snodgrass House. The brigade consisted of the Nineteenth Illinois, Eighteenth Ohio and Eleventh Michigan, about 700 men, placed in line of battle as follows: Nineteenth Illinois on the right, Eleventh Michigan on the left, and the Eighteenth Ohio in reserve. We were expected to repel the assault of Preston's and Kershaw's Divisions of Confederate infantry. Their losses alone during the afternoon were twenty per centum more than the whole number of our brigade. During a lull in the storm of battle we threw up a temporary breastwork of stone, rails and logs. About 5 P. M., after repulsing five successive charges of the enemy, we found ourselves without ammunition. The enemy were about 100 yards in our front, preparing for another charge, and their sharpshooters were firing at every man who showed his head above our light works. The dead and wounded lay in great numbers, right up to our works.

They were armed with Enfield rifles of the same calibre as our Springfield rifles. I don't know what prompted me, but I took my knife from my pocket, stepped over the works, and, while my company cheered and the rebels made a target of me, I hurriedly passed along the front, cutting off the cartridge boxes of the dead and wounded, and threw them over to my company. Thus I secured a few rounds for each of my men. The enemy made one more charge and was again repulsed. Darkness settled down on us, and ended the terrible battle of Chickamauga."

== Medal of Honor citation ==
Rank and Organization: Sergeant, Company B, 11th Michigan Infantry.

Place and Date: At Chickamauga, Georgia, September 20, 1863.

Entered service at: Quincy, Michigan

Date of issue: October 21, 1895.

Citation: As the enemy were about to charge, this officer went outside the temporary Union works among the dead and wounded enemy and at great exposure to himself cut off and removed their cartridge boxes, bringing the same within the Union lines, the ammunition being used with good effect in again repulsing the attack.

== See also ==
- List of Medal of Honor recipients
- List of American Civil War Medal of Honor recipients: T–Z
- Battle of Chickamauga
- 11th Michigan Infantry
