= George B. Cooper (politician) =

American politician

Member of the U.S. House of Representatives from Michigan's 1st district
- In office March 4, 1859 – May 15, 1860
- Preceded by: William Alanson Howard
- Succeeded by: William Alanson Howard

Personal details
- Born: June 6, 1808 Long Hill Township, New Jersey, U.S.
- Died: August 29, 1866 (aged 58) New Bedford, New Jersey, U.S.
- Party: Democratic

George Bryan Cooper (June 6, 1808 – August 29, 1866) was a politician from the U.S. state of Michigan.

== Early life ==
Cooper was born in Long Hill Township, New Jersey, where he attended the public schools. He moved to Ann Arbor, Michigan in 1830, and later to Jackson in 1835. In Jackson he engaged in mercantile pursuits and became postmaster of Jackson from 1836 to 1846.

== Political career ==
He was a member of the Michigan State Senate 4th District, 1837–1838. He established an iron foundry at Jackson in 1840 and served in the Michigan State House of Representatives in 1842. He served as State Treasurer of Michigan from March 17, 1846 to March 13, 1850. He engaged in banking at Jackson in 1851.

In 1858 he defeated incumbent Republican William Alanson Howard to be elected as a Democrat from Michigan's 1st congressional district to the Thirty-sixth Congress, serving from March 4, 1859, until May 15, 1860. Howard contested the results in the U.S. House, alleging voting irregularities in several wards. Following its investigation, the House Committee on Elections reported that the sitting member, Cooper, was not entitled to his seat and that the contestant Howard was. The House passed resolutions to that effect on May 15, 1860, at which time Howard took the oath of office.

After Cooper's removal from office, he resided at New Bedford in Wall Township, New Jersey until his death.

Political offices
Preceded by George R. Redfield	Treasurer of Michigan; 1846–1850	Succeeded by Bernard C. Whittemore
U.S. House of Representatives
Preceded by William Alanson Howard	United States Representative for the 1st congressional district of Michigan; 1859– 1860	Succeeded by William Alanson Howard
