= William Alanson Howard =

American politician (1813–1880)

William Howard
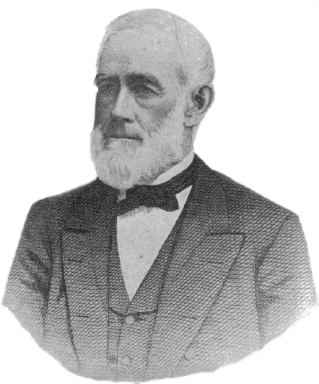

6th Governor of the Dakota Territory
- In office April 12, 1878 – April 10, 1880
- Preceded by: John L. Pennington
- Succeeded by: Nehemiah G. Ordway

Member of the U.S. House of Representatives from Michigan's 1st district
- In office May 15, 1860 – March 3, 1861
- Preceded by: George B. Cooper
- Succeeded by: Bradley F. Granger
- In office March 4, 1855 – March 3, 1859
- Preceded by: David Stuart
- Succeeded by: George B. Cooper

Personal details
- Born: William Alanson Howard; April 8, 1813 Hinesburg, Vermont, U.S.
- Died: April 10, 1880 (aged 67) Washington, D.C., U.S.
- Party: Whig (Before 1854); Republican (1854–1880)
- Education: Middlebury College (BA)

William Alanson Howard (April 8, 1813 – April 10, 1880) served as a member of the United States House of Representatives from Michigan from March 4, 1855, to March 3, 1859, and from May 15, 1860, to March 3, 1861. Howard was the sixth governor of the Dakota Territory from 1878 to 1880.

== Biography ==
William Howard was born at Hinesburg, Vermont. When he was fourteen, Howard apprenticed to a cabinet maker at Albion, New York. He graduated from Middlebury College at Middlebury, Vermont in 1839. Howard taught school before moving to Michigan for health reasons. Howard spent a year teaching mathematics at the University of Michigan. Then, Howard studied law and was admitted to the Michigan bar in 1842 before practicing law in Detroit. In 1850 he was a lead defense attorney for those accused of plotting the burning of the Michigan Central Depot in Detroit.

In 1854, Howard was elected as a Republican candidate to represent Michigan's 1st congressional district in the 34th Congress, and was re-elected two years later. He successfully contested the election in 1859 of George B. Cooper to the 36th Congress and served from May 15, 1860, until March 3, 1861; was not a candidate for renomination in 1860

After leaving Congress, he became Chairman of the Michigan Republican Party from 1862 to 1868. From 1869 to 1871, Howard served as land commissioner of the Grand Rapids and Indiana Railway. In 1871, Howard ran unsuccessfully as a Republican candidate for the United States Senate. From 1872 to 1878, Howard was the land commissioner of the North Pacific Railway.

In 1878, Howard was appointed as Governor of Dakota Territory by President Rutherford B. Hayes. The appointment was approved April 12, 1878. At the age of sixty-six, Howard came to Dakota Territory and served as Governor until the time of his death, spending the last part of his life residing in Yankton, Dakota Territory. Howard died in Washington, D.C., aged 67.

U.S. House of Representatives
Preceded by David Stuart	Member of the U.S. House of Representatives from Michigan's 1st congressional district 1855–1859	Succeeded by George Cooper
Preceded by George Cooper	Member of the U.S. House of Representatives from Michigan's 1st congressional district 1860–1861	Succeeded by Bradley F. Granger
Party political offices
Preceded by E. C. Walker	Chair of the Michigan Republican Party; 1862–1868	Succeeded by John J. Bagley
Political offices
Preceded by John L. Pennington	Governor of the Dakota Territory; 1878–1880	Succeeded by Nehemiah G. Ordway
