= Jacob Critz House =

Historic house in Tennessee, United States

- U.S. National Register of Historic Places
- Location within Tennessee Location within the United States
- Location: Evergreen Rd. 1 1/2 mi. E of Pope Chapel Rd., Thompson's Station, Tennessee
- Coordinates: 35°47′56″N 86°56′44″W
- Area: 1.7 acres (0.69 ha)
- Built: c. 1835; 191 years ago
- Architectural style: Central passage plan
- MPS: Williamson County MRA
- NRHP reference No.: 88000343
- Added to NRHP: April 13, 1988

The Jacob Critz House is a c. 1835 center-hall house in Thompson's Station, Tennessee, United States. It was listed on the National Register of Historic Places in 1988. When listed the property included one contributing building, one non-contributing building, and one non-contributing structure, on 1.7 acres (0.69 ha). The property was covered in a 1988 study of Williamson County historical resources.

The home was likely leased in 1866 by carpetbagger James Wood King in his attempt to raise cotton in the south after the American Civil War.

== See also ==
- Thomas L. Critz House, also in Thompson's Station and listed on the National Register of Historic Places
