= Henry Waldron =

American politician (1819–1880)

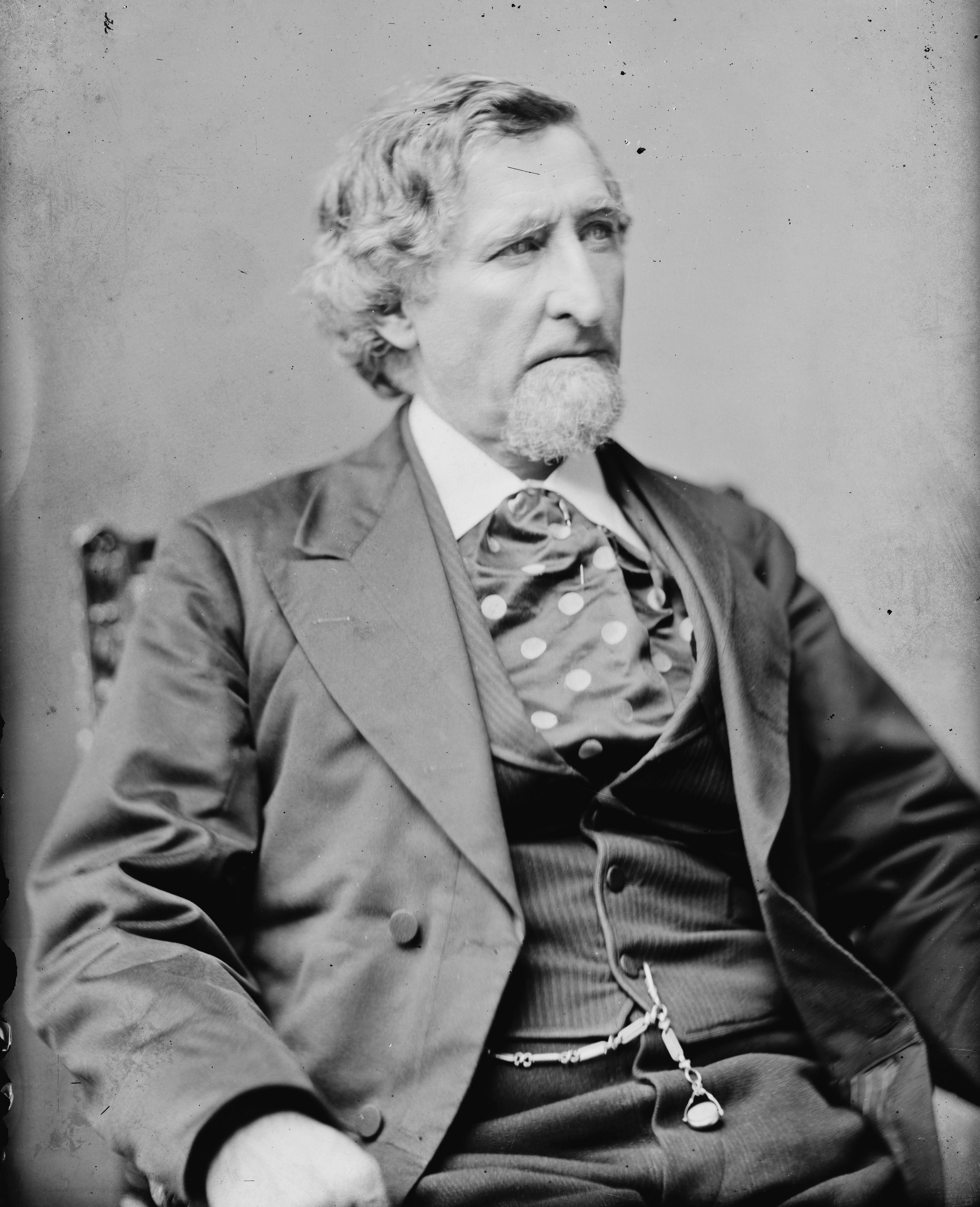

Member of the U.S. House of Representatives from Michigan
- In office March 4, 1855 – March 3, 1861
- Preceded by: David A. Noble
- Succeeded by: Fernando C. Beaman
- Constituency: 2nd district
- In office March 4, 1871 – March 3, 1877
- Preceded by: Fernando C. Beaman (1st); William L. Stoughton (2nd)
- Succeeded by: Moses W. Field (1st); Edwin Willits (2nd)
- Constituency: 1st district (1871-73); 2nd district (1873-77)

Member of the Michigan House of Representatives from the Hillsdale County district
- In office 1843

Personal details
- Born: October 11, 1819 Albany, New York, U.S.
- Died: September 13, 1880 (aged 60) Hilsdale, Hillsdale County, Michigan, U.S.
- Resting place: Oak Grove Cemetery; Hillsdale, Michigan
- Party: Republican
- Education: Rutgers College; New Brunswick, New Jersey
- Profession: Civil Engineer; Politician

Henry Waldron (October 11, 1819 – September 13, 1880) was an American politician and a United States representative from the U.S. state of Michigan.

== Early life ==
Waldron was born in Albany, New York, attended Albany Academy, and graduated from Rutgers College in New Brunswick, New Jersey in 1836. He moved to Michigan in 1837 and was employed as a civil engineer in railroad work. In 1839 Waldron settled in Hillsdale, Michigan.

== Career ==
Waldron became a member of the Michigan House of Representatives in 1843, where he represented the Hillsdale County district, and was a director of the Michigan Southern Railroad, serving from 1846 to 1848. He was active in promoting the construction of the Detroit, Hillsdale and South Western Railroad and served as its first president. He was a presidential elector on the Whig Party ticket in 1848.

In 1854, he defeated incumbent Democrat David A. Noble to be elected as a Republican from Michigan's 2nd congressional district to the Thirty-fourth Congress. He was re-elected to the Thirty-fifth and Thirty-sixth Congresses, serving from March 4, 1855, to March 3, 1861. He was chairman of the Committee on Expenditures in the Department of the Treasury in the Thirty-fourth Congress. He was not a candidate for re-nomination in 1860.

In 1870, he was elected to represent Michigan's 1st congressional district to the Forty-second Congress and subsequently re-elected to represent Michigan's 2nd district to the Forty-third and Forty-fourth Congresses, serving from March 4, 1871, to March 3, 1877. He was chairman of the Committee on Mines and Mining in the Forty-second Congress. He declined to be a candidate for re-nomination.

In 1876, Waldron was elected president of the First National Bank of Hillsdale and served until his death.

== Death and legacy ==
Waldron died in Hillsdale, Hillsdale County, Michigan, on September 13, 1880 (age 60 years, 338 days). He is interred at Oak Grove Cemetery, Hillsdale, Michigan.

The village of Waldron, Michigan is named in his honour because of his contribution to the village..

U.S. House of Representatives
Preceded by David A. Noble	United States Representative for the 2nd congressional district of Michigan; 1855–1861	Succeeded by Fernando C. Beaman
Preceded by Fernando C. Beaman	United States Representative for the 1st congressional district of Michigan; 1871–1873	Succeeded by Moses W. Field
Preceded by William L. Stoughton	United States Representative for the 2nd congressional district of Michigan; 1873–1877	Succeeded by Edwin Willits
