= Charles Upson =

American politician (1821–1885)

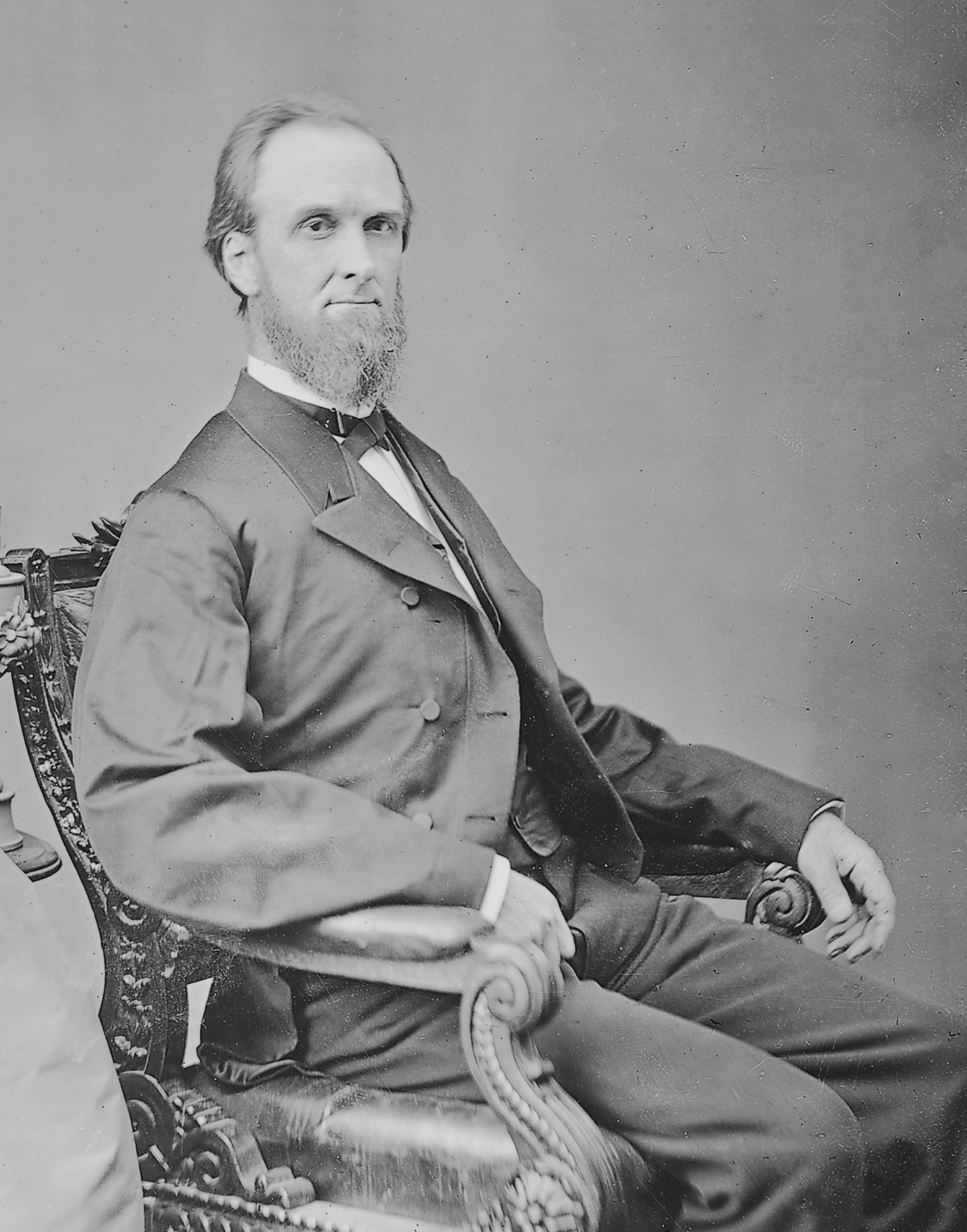
- Brady-Handy photo, National Archives and Records Administration

Member of the U.S. House of Representatives from Michigan's 2nd district
- In office March 4, 1863 – March 3, 1869
- Preceded by: Fernando C. Beaman
- Succeeded by: William L. Stoughton

Member of the Michigan Senate from the 10th district
- In office 1881–1882
- Preceded by: Edward W. Pendleton
- Succeeded by: Orlando J. Fast

Member of the Michigan Senate from the 17th district
- In office 1855–1856
- Preceded by: Edward S. Moore
- Succeeded by: Alonzo Garwood

Personal details
- Born: March 19, 1821 Southington, Connecticut, U.S.
- Died: September 5, 1885 (aged 64) Coldwater, Michigan, U.S.
- Party: Republican
- Spouse: Sophia Upham (after 1852)

Charles Upson (March 19, 1821 – September 5, 1885) was a politician from the U.S. state of Michigan.

Upson was born in Southington, Connecticut, to Lydia (Webster) Upson (1781–1861) and Asahel Upson (1783–1867). He attended the district and select schools of Southington and later taught school in Farmington from 1840 to 1842. He married Sophia Upham on August 4, 1852.

Upson studied law at the Yale Law School in 1844 and moved to Constantine, Michigan the following year. He taught school in 1846 and 1847 and became deputy county clerk of St. Joseph County in 1847. He was admitted to the bar in 1847 and commenced practice in Kalamazoo. He served as county clerk from 1848 to 1849 and prosecuting attorney from 1852 to 1854. He was a member of the Michigan Senate (17th District) from 1855 to 1856. He moved to Coldwater, Michigan in 1856 and continued the practice of law. He was a member of the State board of railroad commissioners in 1857 and served as Michigan Attorney General from 1861 to 1862.

In 1862 was elected as a Republican from Michigan's 2nd congressional district to the 38th United States Congress and was re-elected to the 39th and 40th Congresses, serving from March 4, 1863, to March 3, 1869. He served as chairman of the Committee on Expenditures in the Department of the Navy (Fortieth Congress). He was not a candidate for renomination in 1868.

In 1869, Upson was appointed judge of the Michigan fifteenth circuit court, serving until his resignation on December 31, 1872. He was a member of the commission to revise the State constitution in 1873. In 1876, he declined appointment as Commissioner of Indian Affairs. He served as mayor of the city of Coldwater in 1877. He was again a member of the Michigan Senate (10th District) serving from 1881 to 1882 and resumed the practice of his profession.

Charles Upson died in Coldwater and was interred in Oak Grove Cemetery.

Legal offices
Preceded by Jacob M. Howard	Michigan Attorney General; 1861–1862	Succeeded by Albert Williams
U.S. House of Representatives
Preceded by Fernando C. Beaman	United States Representative for the 2nd congressional district of Michigan; 1863–1869	Succeeded by William L. Stoughton
