= 11th Michigan Infantry Regiment =

- Michigan state flag
- Active: August 24, 1861 – September 30, 1864
- Disbanded: October 11, 1864
- Country: United States
- Allegiance: Union
- Type: Infantry
- Size: Regiment
- Engagements: American Civil War: Battle of Stones River; Battle of Davis's Cross Roads; Battle of Chickamauga; Battle of Missionary Ridge; Battle of Rocky Face Ridge; Battle of Resaca; Battle of Pickett's Mill; Battle of Kennesaw Mountain; Battle of Ruff's Station; Battle of Peachtree Creek; Battle of Utoy Creek

Commanders
- Colonel: William L. Stoughton
- Lt. Colonel: Melvin Mudge

The 11th Michigan Infantry Regiment, initially known as Colonel May's Independent Regiment, was a unit in the Union army during the American Civil War. The regiment fought with the Army of the Cumberland in numerous battles, including Stones River, Chickamauga, and Missionary Ridge.

== Regimental history ==
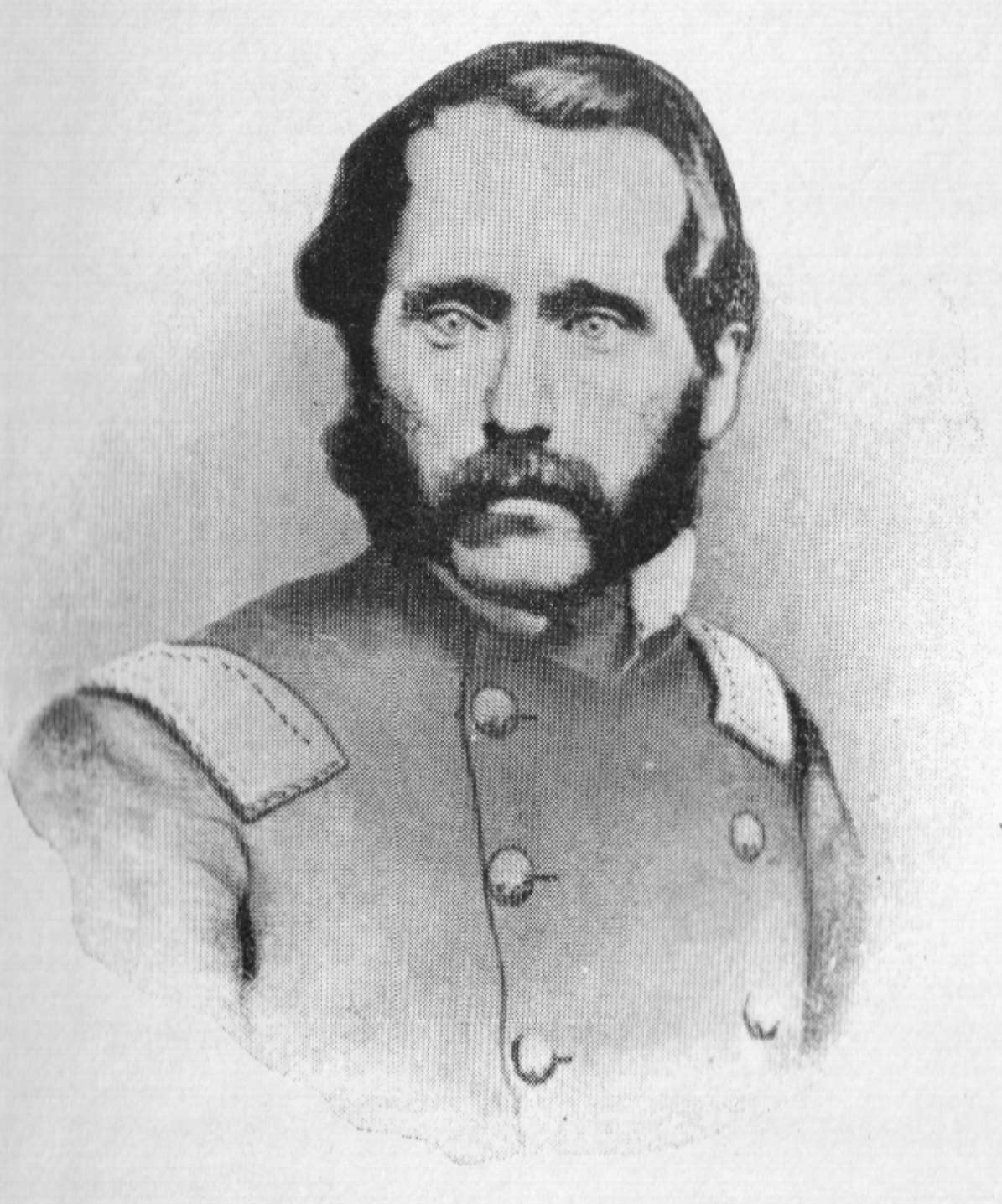
Colonel William L. Stoughton

The regiment was recruited in southern Michigan between April and September 1861, with the majority of the soldiers coming from St. Joseph County. The unit formally mustered into the Union army between August 24 and September 11. It formed independent from the state government, as allowed for by the War Department, but fell under Michigan's control when the Federal authorization for independent units was revoked. The regiment received its formal designation as the 11th regiment on October 11. The soldiers elected their officers, selecting William J. May, the former proprietor of the White Pigeon Railroad Dining Hall, as colonel. U.S. district attorney William Lewis Stoughton, a rising star in the Republican Party, was elected lieutenant colonel.

The 11th Michigan trained at White Pigeon before deploying to Kentucky on December 9, 1861, with 1,004 men and officers. Far from the front lines, the unit saw little active service, but suffered dearly from smallpox and measles at Bardstown, Kentucky that winter, losing more than seventy men to disease. Colonel May, suffering from poor health, resigned effective April 1, raising Stoughton to colonel in his place. Melvin Mudge was promoted to fill the vacancy at lieutenant colonel.

The Michiganders went on railroad guard duty in March 1862 as the Union army advanced into Tennessee following Ulysses S. Grant's captures of Forts Henry and Donelson. The regiment's first taste of active military operations came when Confederate cavalryman John Hunt Morgan launched a raid through Tennessee and Kentucky in July. The 11th regiment, in conjunction with other Federal units, was dispatched on a wild goose chase that culminated in a narrow miss at surrounding Morgan's entire force at Paris, Kentucky. The regiment, in conjunction with other units, later caught up with a detachment of Morgan's troopers at Gallatin, Tennessee, on August 13, 1862, firing the first volleys in the regiment's history. The Michiganders claimed to have inflicted numerous casualties on Morgan's force, though Morgan's subordinate Basil Duke (who was not present) later denied any Confederate losses. The Michiganders and their Federal counterparts pillaged Gallatin while there, embittering Morgan and hardening his attitude toward Union civilians.

Braxton Bragg’s Confederate invasion of Kentucky in August 1862 left the 11th Michigan among the Federal units stranded in isolation at Nashville under the command of James Scott Negley. The 11th was finally brigaded at this time, joining the 19th Illinois Infantry, the 18th Ohio Infantry, and the 69th Ohio under the command of Colonel Timothy Robbins Stanley, former commander of the 18th Ohio. Stanley's brigade was part of Negley's division of the 14th Army Corps, which came to be known as the Army of the Cumberland. The Michiganders came under fire again on October 5, 1862, when they repelled a guerrilla ambush near Fort Riley while out on a foraging expedition.

After Bragg's invasion was repulsed at Perryville, the 11th Michigan joined the Army of the Cumberland's advance under Major General William Starke Rosecrans in late December, and was heavily engaged at the Battle of Stones River. The green Michiganders fought bravely despite absorbing severe casualties (140 killed, wounded, or missing—a 32 percent loss), and helped stall Bragg's powerful opening assault shy of Rosecrans's supply artery, the Nashville Pike. The unit took part in the decisive charge across Stones River on January 2, 1863, participating in the rout of John C. Breckinridge's division.

After months of recuperation in Murfreesboro, Rosecrans advanced again in the Tullahoma Campaign on June 23, 1863, turning Bragg's army out of its position, and repeated this feat to force his retreat from Chattanooga. When Rosecrans pushed too aggressively in pursuit, Negley's division, the 11th Michigan included, was nearly cut off and captured, but fought a successful delaying action against a vastly superior Confederate force at the Battle of Davis's Cross Roads. The 11th was the most heavily engaged unit in the battle, losing 3 dead, 11 wounded, and 3 missing (the missing soldiers later perished at Andersonville). A week later, the adversaries clashed again at the Battle of Chickamauga, where the 11th Michigan on September 20, 1863, helped parry a Rebel attempt to flank George H. Thomas’s corps and cut the Union army off from its line of retreat. The Michiganders participated in the ambush of Brigadier General Daniel Weisiger Adams’s brigade, inflicting severe losses on the Confederates and capturing Adams in the process. Later that day—with Stanley wounded, Stoughton raised to brigade command, and Mudge leading the regiment—the 11th Michigan participated in the legendary defense of Snodgrass Hill (also known as Horseshoe Ridge), inflicting catastrophic casualties on the Confederate brigade of Archibald Gracie. Confederate general Joseph Kershaw, witnessing the attack, declared it “one of the heaviest assaults of the war on a single point.” Michigan sergeant William G. Whitney earned the Medal of Honor for gathering desperately needed ammunition from downed Rebels between the lines—while under fire from Rebel sharpshooters—during a brief lull in the assault. Overall casualties for the 11th Michigan at Chickamauga amounted to 66 men, with Mudge among the wounded.

The Union defeat at Chickamauga left the Army of the Cumberland virtually under siege in Chattanooga, but the arrival of reinforcements under Ulysses S. Grant turned the tables several weeks later, and the 11th Michigan joined in the Battle of Missionary Ridge on November 25, 1863. Stoughton was again in command of the brigade, and Major Benjamin G. Bennett led the regiment with Mudge still recovering from his Chickamauga wound. The Michiganders, despite having Bennett and Color Bearer John Day killed, successfully charged uphill against the entrenched Rebels of Otho F. Strahl’s brigade, with lead elements of the Michigan regiment penetrating a gap between Strahl's troops and the neighboring brigade of Randall Gibson. Quartermaster Sergeant James Wood King, who entered the battle outside his line of duty, was among the first soldiers to reach the summit and fight to pry open the breach in the Rebel line. King was later nominated for the Medal of Honor. Bragg's siege was broken by the Federal assault, and the Confederates were hurtled into a precipitous retreat. Stoughton's troops participated in the pursuit of Bragg's army the next day, launching a night assault in pitch darkness near Graysville, Georgia, and capturing the Confederate artillery battery of Thomas B. Ferguson without the loss of a single soldier.

After wintering at Rossville and Graysville, Georgia, the 11th Michigan joined in William Tecumseh Sherman’s Atlanta campaign. The Michiganders were present, but only lightly engaged, at Buzzard Roost Gap and the Battle of Resaca. At the Battle of Pickett's Mill, the unit came under artillery fire, followed by its first taste of prolonged trench warfare. With the resumption of Sherman's advance, the Michiganders again dug in, at Kennesaw Mountain, where they traded constant sniping with the Rebels but were mercifully excluded from the bloody Battle of Kennesaw Mountain on June 27. In pursuit of the subsequent Confederate retreat, the Michiganders were engaged at Battle of Ruff's Station, where Colonel Stoughton suffered a severe shell wound that necessitated the amputation of his leg. Five companies from the 11th Michigan participated in a successful but costly assault against Rebel entrenchments near the railroad, losing three dead and ten wounded.

The 11th Michigan was again lightly engaged at Peachtree Creek on July 20, where the unit rushed the length of the Union line under artillery fire to plug a gap with John Newton's 4th Corps division. In the ensuing actions against Atlanta, the regiment was again called upon to charge entrenched Rebels, this time at the Battle of Utoy Creek on August 7. The Michiganders seized the first line of Confederate trenches at the cost of fifteen dead and fifteen wounded. With the regiment's three-year enlistment period about to expire, the soldiers nearly mutinied when ordered to charge across the open field, but a timely speech by Mudge convinced the bluecoats to do their duty under fire one last time.

The regiment was relieved from front line duty on August 27, but a Rebel cavalry raid by Joseph Wheeler necessitated their involvement in another infantry-cavalry chase. After helping to drive Wheeler off, the unit finally embarked for home via railroad on September 19. Stopping at Sidney, Ohio, on the 24th, the Michiganders stumbled across Copperhead Clement L. Vallandigham and democratic vice presidential candidate George H. Pendleton, both of whom were reviled by the soldiers for their antiwar stances. Mudge narrowly restrained his soldiers from killing the politicians, who were chased off but still delivered speeches in town later that day. Upon departing Sidney, Mudge's troops made off with a cannon used by Vallandhigham's supporters to fire off salutes in his honor. The 11th Michigan returned home safely, and was mustered out on October 11, 1864.

== Total Strength and casualties ==
The 11th Michigan had a total enrollment of about 1,323 men. (Precise figures are unavailable due to lax recordkeeping, and the numbers vary by source.) Approximately 279 of the Michiganders died in the service (97 in battle). About 265 were discharged for disability.

== Commanders ==
- Colonel William J. May - resigned April 1, 1862
- Colonel William Lewis Stoughton - resigned August 1864
- Lieutenant Colonel Melvin B. Mudge - commanded at Chickamauga

== See also ==
- James Wood King - Medal of Honor nominee and quartermaster sergeant, 11th Michigan Infantry
- William G. Whitney - Medal of Honor winner and member of Company B, 11th Michigan Infantry
