= Michigan's 1st congressional district =

U.S. House district for Michigan

Coordinates: 46°09′26″N 86°26′13″W

- Interactive map of district boundaries since January 3, 2023
- Representative: Jack Bergman; R–Watersmeet
- Area: 24,875 mi^{2} (64,430 km^{2})
- Distribution: 63.42% rural; 36.58% urban
- Population (2025): 787,689
- Median household income: $67,117
- Ethnicity: 89.4% White; 4.4% Two or more races; 2.4% Native American; 2.0% Hispanic; 0.9% Black; 0.5% Asian; 0.3% other
- Cook PVI: R+11

Michigan's 1st congressional district is a United States congressional district that fully contains the 15 counties of the Upper Peninsula of Michigan and 20 counties of Northern Michigan in the Lower Peninsula. The district is currently represented by Republican Jack Bergman.

== Characteristics ==
The district is the third-largest congressional district east of the Mississippi River by land area, only behind Maine's 2nd congressional district and New York's 21st congressional district. Its boundaries contain the entire Upper Peninsula of Michigan and much of the northern part of the Lower Peninsula. Altogether, the district makes up about 44% of the land area of the state of Michigan yet contains only 7% of Michigan's population. It contains the second-longest shoreline of any district in the United States, behind Alaska's at-large congressional district.

== Counties and municipalities ==
For the 118th and successive Congresses (based on redistricting following the 2020 census), the district contains all or portions of the following counties and municipalities:

Alcona County (13)

All 13 municipalities

Alger County (10)

All 10 municipalities

Alpena County (10)

All 10 municipalities

Antrim County (20)

All 20 municipalities

Arenac County (18)

All 18 municipalities

Baraga County (7)

All 7 municipalities

Benzie County (7)

All 7 municipalities

Charlevoix County (19)

All 19 municipalities

Cheboygan County (22)

All 22 municipalities

Chippewa County (18)

All 18 municipalities

Crawford County (7)

All 7 municipalities

Delta County (17)

All 17 municipalities

Dickinson County (10)

All 10 municipalities

Emmet County (21)

All 21 municipalities

Gogebic County (9)

All 9 municipalities

Grand Traverse County (16)

All 16 municipalities

Houghton County (21)

All 21 municipalities

Iosco County (14)

All 14 municipalities

Iron County (5)

All 5 municipalities

Kalkaska County (13)

All 13 municipalities

Keweenaw County (6)

All 6 municipalities

Leelanau County (15)

All 15 municipalities

Luce County (5)

All 5 municipalities

Mackinac County (13)

All 13 municipalities

Marquette County (22)

All 22 municipalities

Menominee County (19)

All 19 municipalities

Missaukee County (17)

All 17 municipalities

Montmorency County (9)

All 9 municipalities

Ogemaw County (17)

All 17 municipalities

Ontonagon County (12)

All 12 municipalities

Oscoda County (6)

All 6 municipalities

Otsego County (11)

All 11 municipalities

Presque Isle County (18)

All 18 municipalities

Roscommon County (12)

All 12 municipalities

Schoolcraft County (9)

All 9 municipalities

Wexford County (5)

Buckley, Greenwood Township, Hanover Township, Liberty Township, Wexford Township (part; also 2nd)

== History ==
Prior to 1992, the 1st congressional district was a Detroit-based congressional district. From the election of Republican John B. Sosnowski in 1925 until 1964, the former 1st district was represented by only one non-Polish-American politician, Robert H. Clancy. Along with Sosnowski, 6 Polish-Americans served as the 1st district's representatives elected 7 times, since 1925. The other strong Polish Michigan congressional districts were the 15th district (where half of the elected were Polish-American) and the dissolved 16th district (where all three elected representatives were of Polish descent). In 1964, the 1st congressional district was drawn as a new, African-American majority district reflecting the changing demographics of Detroit, while most of the old 1st's territory was merged with the old 14th district. The old 1st's congressman, Lucien Nedzi, transferred to the reconfigured 14th, while John Conyers was elected to Congress from the new 1st district.

Conyers held the seat until 1992, when his district essentially became the 14th district. Meanwhile, the 1st was reconfigured as the Upper Peninsula and Northern Michigan district, covering most of what had been the 11th district from 1892 to 1992. The 1st from 1992 to 2002 was similar to the present district, except that it did not extend nearly as far south along Lake Michigan, while it took in Traverse City and some surrounding areas on the west side of the state.

== Recent election results from statewide races ==
Year	Office	Results
2008	President	Obama 49% - 48%
2012	President	Romney 55% - 45%
2014	Senate	Lynn Land 49% - 47%
2014	Governor	Snyder 54% - 43%
2014	Secretary of State	Johnson 58% - 38%
2014	Attorney General	Schuette 59% - 37%
2016	President	Trump 59% - 36%
2018	Senate	James 55% - 43%
2018	Governor	Schuette 54% - 43%
2018	Attorney General	Leonard 57% - 38%
2020	President	Trump 59% - 39%
2020	Senate	James 59% - 40%
2022	Governor	Dixon 54% - 44%
2022	Secretary of State	Karamo 53% - 44%
2022	Attorney General	DePerno 55% - 43%
2024	President	Trump 60% - 39%
2024	Senate	Rogers 59% - 39%

== List of members representing the district ==
Member	Party	Years	Cong ress	Electoral history	District location
District created March 4, 1843
Robert McClelland (Monroe)	Democratic	March 4, 1843 – March 3, 1849	28th 29th 30th	Elected in 1843. Re-elected in 1844. Re-elected in 1846. Retired.	1843–1853 [data missing]
Alexander W. Buel (Detroit)	Democratic	March 4, 1849 – March 3, 1851	31st	Elected in 1848. Lost re-election.	1843–1853 [data missing]
Ebenezer J. Penniman (Plymouth)	Whig	March 4, 1851 – March 3, 1853	32nd	Elected in 1850. Retired.	1843–1853 [data missing]
David Stuart (Detroit)	Democratic	March 4, 1853 – March 3, 1855	33rd	Elected in 1852. Lost re-election.	1853–1863 [data missing]
William A. Howard (Detroit)	Opposition	March 4, 1855 – March 3, 1857	34th	Elected in 1854. Re-elected in 1856. Lost re-election.	1853–1863 [data missing]
William A. Howard (Detroit)	Republican	March 4, 1857 – March 3, 1859	35th	Elected in 1854. Re-elected in 1856. Lost re-election.	1853–1863 [data missing]
George B. Cooper (Jackson)	Democratic	March 4, 1859 – May 15, 1860	36th	Elected in 1858. Lost election contest.	1853–1863 [data missing]
William A. Howard (Detroit)	Republican	May 15, 1860 – March 3, 1861	36th	Won election contest. Retired.	1853–1863 [data missing]
Bradley F. Granger (Ann Arbor)	Republican	March 4, 1861 – March 3, 1863	37th	Elected in 1860. Redistricted to the 3rd district and lost re-election as a Democrat.	1853–1863 [data missing]
Fernando C. Beaman (Adrian)	Republican	March 4, 1863 – March 3, 1871	38th 39th 40th 41st	Redistricted from the 2nd district and re-elected in 1862. Re-elected in 1864. Re-elected in 1866. Re-elected in 1868. Retired.	1863–1873 [data missing]
Henry Waldron (Hillsdale)	Republican	March 4, 1871 – March 3, 1873	42nd	Elected in 1870. Redistricted to the 2nd district.	1863–1873 [data missing]
Moses W. Field (Detroit)	Republican	March 4, 1873 – March 3, 1875	43rd	Elected in 1872. Lost re-election.	1873–1883 [data missing]
Alpheus S. Williams (Detroit)	Democratic	March 4, 1875 – December 21, 1878	44th 45th	Elected in 1874. Re-elected in 1876. Lost re-election and died before next term began.	1873–1883 [data missing]
Vacant		December 21, 1878 – March 3, 1879	45th		1873–1883 [data missing]
John S. Newberry (Detroit)	Republican	March 4, 1879 – March 3, 1881	46th	Elected in 1878. Retired.	1873–1883 [data missing]
Henry W. Lord (Detroit)	Republican	March 4, 1881 – March 3, 1883	47th	Elected in 1880. Lost re-election.	1873–1883 [data missing]
William C. Maybury (Detroit)	Democratic	March 4, 1883 – March 3, 1887	48th 49th	Elected in 1882. Re-elected in 1884. Retired.	1883–1893 [data missing]
John L. Chipman (Detroit)	Democratic	March 4, 1887 – August 17, 1893	50th 51st 52nd 53rd	Elected in 1886. Re-elected in 1888. Re-elected in 1890. Re-elected in 1892. Died.	1883–1893 [data missing]
John L. Chipman (Detroit)	Democratic	March 4, 1887 – August 17, 1893	50th 51st 52nd 53rd	Elected in 1886. Re-elected in 1888. Re-elected in 1890. Re-elected in 1892. Died.	1893–1903 [data missing]
Vacant		August 17, 1893 – November 7, 1893	53rd		1893–1903 [data missing]
Levi T. Griffin (Detroit)	Democratic	December 4, 1893 – March 3, 1895	53rd	Elected to finish Chipman's term. Lost re-election.	1893–1903 [data missing]
John B. Corliss (Detroit)	Republican	March 4, 1895 – March 3, 1903	54th 55th 56th 57th	Elected in 1894. Re-elected in 1896. Re-elected in 1898. Re-elected in 1900. Lost re-election.	1893–1903 [data missing]
Alfred Lucking (Detroit)	Democratic	March 4, 1903 – March 3, 1905	58th	Elected in 1902. Lost re-election.	1903–1913 [data missing]
Edwin C. Denby (Detroit)	Republican	March 4, 1905 – March 3, 1911	59th 60th 61st	Elected in 1904. Re-elected in 1906. Re-elected in 1908. Lost re-election.	1903–1913 [data missing]
Frank E. Doremus (Detroit)	Democratic	March 4, 1911 – March 3, 1921	62nd 63rd 64th 65th 66th	Elected in 1910. Re-elected in 1912. Re-elected in 1914. Re-elected in 1916. Re-elected in 1918. Retired.	1903–1913 [data missing]
Frank E. Doremus (Detroit)	Democratic	March 4, 1911 – March 3, 1921	62nd 63rd 64th 65th 66th	Elected in 1910. Re-elected in 1912. Re-elected in 1914. Re-elected in 1916. Re-elected in 1918. Retired.	1913–1933 [data missing]
George P. Codd (Detroit)	Republican	March 4, 1921 – March 3, 1923	67th	Elected in 1920. Retired.	1913–1933 [data missing]
Robert H. Clancy (Detroit)	Democratic	March 4, 1923 – March 3, 1925	68th	Elected in 1922. Lost re-election.	1913–1933 [data missing]
John B. Sosnowski (Detroit)	Republican	March 4, 1925 – March 3, 1927	69th	Elected in 1924. Lost renomination.	1913–1933 [data missing]
Robert H. Clancy (Detroit)	Republican	March 4, 1927 – March 3, 1933	70th 71st 72nd	Elected in 1926. Re-elected in 1928. Re-elected in 1930. Redistricted to the 14th district and lost re-election.	1913–1933 [data missing]
George G. Sadowski (Detroit)	Democratic	March 4, 1933 – January 3, 1939	73rd 74th 75th	Elected in 1932. Re-elected in 1934. Re-elected in 1936. Lost renomination.	1933–1943 [data missing]
Rudolph G. Tenerowicz (Detroit)	Democratic	January 3, 1939 – January 3, 1943	76th 77th	Elected in 1938. Re-elected in 1940. Lost renomination.	1933–1943 [data missing]
George G. Sadowski (Detroit)	Democratic	January 3, 1943 – January 3, 1951	78th 79th 80th 81st	Elected in 1942. Re-elected in 1944. Re-elected in 1946. Re-elected in 1948. Lost renomination.	1943–1953 [data missing]
Thaddeus M. Machrowicz (Hamtramck)	Democratic	January 3, 1951 – September 18, 1961	82nd 83rd 84th 85th 86th 87th	Elected in 1950. Re-elected in 1952. Re-elected in 1954. Re-elected in 1956. Re-elected in 1958. Re-elected in 1960. Resigned to become U.S. District Judge.	1943–1953 [data missing]
Thaddeus M. Machrowicz (Hamtramck)	Democratic	January 3, 1951 – September 18, 1961	82nd 83rd 84th 85th 86th 87th	Elected in 1950. Re-elected in 1952. Re-elected in 1954. Re-elected in 1956. Re-elected in 1958. Re-elected in 1960. Resigned to become U.S. District Judge.	1953–1963 [data missing]
Vacant		September 18, 1961 – November 7, 1961	87th		1953–1963 [data missing]
Lucien Nedzi (Detroit)	Democratic	November 7, 1961 – January 3, 1965	87th 88th	Elected to finish Machrowicz's term. Re-elected in 1962. Redistricted to the 14th district.	1953–1963 [data missing]
Lucien Nedzi (Detroit)	Democratic	November 7, 1961 – January 3, 1965	87th 88th	Elected to finish Machrowicz's term. Re-elected in 1962. Redistricted to the 14th district.	1963–1973 [data missing]
John Conyers (Detroit)	Democratic	January 3, 1965 – January 3, 1993	89th 90th 91st 92nd 93rd 94th 95th 96th 97th 98th 99th 100th 101st 102nd	Elected in 1964. Re-elected in 1966. Re-elected in 1968. Re-elected in 1970. Re-elected in 1972. Re-elected in 1974. Re-elected in 1976. Re-elected in 1978. Re-elected in 1980. Re-elected in 1982. Re-elected in 1984. Re-elected in 1986. Re-elected in 1988. Re-elected in 1990. Redistricted to the 14th district.	1963–1973 [data missing]
John Conyers (Detroit)	Democratic	January 3, 1965 – January 3, 1993	89th 90th 91st 92nd 93rd 94th 95th 96th 97th 98th 99th 100th 101st 102nd	Elected in 1964. Re-elected in 1966. Re-elected in 1968. Re-elected in 1970. Re-elected in 1972. Re-elected in 1974. Re-elected in 1976. Re-elected in 1978. Re-elected in 1980. Re-elected in 1982. Re-elected in 1984. Re-elected in 1986. Re-elected in 1988. Re-elected in 1990. Redistricted to the 14th district.	1973–1983 [data missing]
John Conyers (Detroit)	Democratic	January 3, 1965 – January 3, 1993	89th 90th 91st 92nd 93rd 94th 95th 96th 97th 98th 99th 100th 101st 102nd	Elected in 1964. Re-elected in 1966. Re-elected in 1968. Re-elected in 1970. Re-elected in 1972. Re-elected in 1974. Re-elected in 1976. Re-elected in 1978. Re-elected in 1980. Re-elected in 1982. Re-elected in 1984. Re-elected in 1986. Re-elected in 1988. Re-elected in 1990. Redistricted to the 14th district.	1983–1993 [data missing]
Bart Stupak (Menominee)	Democratic	January 3, 1993 – January 3, 2011	103rd 104th 105th 106th 107th 108th 109th 110th 111th	Elected in 1992. Re-elected in 1994. Re-elected in 1996. Re-elected in 1998. Re-elected in 2000. Re-elected in 2002. Re-elected in 2004. Re-elected in 2006. Re-elected in 2008. Retired.	1993–2003
Bart Stupak (Menominee)	Democratic	January 3, 1993 – January 3, 2011	103rd 104th 105th 106th 107th 108th 109th 110th 111th	Elected in 1992. Re-elected in 1994. Re-elected in 1996. Re-elected in 1998. Re-elected in 2000. Re-elected in 2002. Re-elected in 2004. Re-elected in 2006. Re-elected in 2008. Retired.	2003–2013
Dan Benishek (Crystal Falls)	Republican	January 3, 2011 – January 3, 2017	112th 113th 114th	Elected in 2010. Re-elected in 2012. Re-elected in 2014. Retired.	2003–2013
Dan Benishek (Crystal Falls)	Republican	January 3, 2011 – January 3, 2017	112th 113th 114th	Elected in 2010. Re-elected in 2012. Re-elected in 2014. Retired.	2013–2023
Jack Bergman (Watersmeet)	Republican	January 3, 2017 – present	115th 116th 117th 118th 119th	Elected in 2016. Re-elected in 2018. Re-elected in 2020. Re-elected in 2022. Re-elected in 2024. Re-elected in 2026.	2013–2023
Jack Bergman (Watersmeet)	Republican	January 3, 2017 – present	115th 116th 117th 118th 119th	Elected in 2016. Re-elected in 2018. Re-elected in 2020. Re-elected in 2022. Re-elected in 2024. Re-elected in 2026.	2023–present

== Elections ==
=== 2012 ===
Michigan's 1st congressional district, 2012
Party	Candidate	Votes	%
Republican	Dan Benishek (incumbent)	167,060	48.1
Democratic	Gary McDowell	165,179	47.6
Libertarian	Emily Salvette	10,630	3.1
Green	Ellis Boal	4,168	1.2
Total votes		347,037	100.0
Republican hold			

=== 2014 ===
Michigan's 1st congressional district, 2014
Party	Candidate	Votes	%
Republican	Dan Benishek (incumbent)	130,414	52.1
Democratic	Jerry Cannon	113,263	45.3
Libertarian	Loel Gnadt	3,823	1.5
Green	Ellis Boal	2,631	1.1
Total votes		250,131	100.0
Republican hold			

=== 2016 ===
Michigan's 1st congressional district, 2016
Party	Candidate	Votes	%
Republican	Jack Bergman	197,777	54.9
Democratic	Lon Johnson	144,334	40.1
Libertarian	Diane Bostow	13,386	3.7
Green	Ellis Boal	4,774	1.3
Total votes		360,271	100.0
Republican hold			

=== 2018 ===
Michigan's 1st congressional district, 2018
Party	Candidate	Votes	%
Republican	Jack Bergman (incumbent)	187,251	56.3
Democratic	Matt Morgan	145,246	43.7
Total votes		332,497	100.0
Republican hold			

=== 2020 ===
Michigan's 1st congressional district, 2020
Party	Candidate	Votes	%
Republican	Jack Bergman (incumbent)	256,581	61.7
Democratic	Dana Ferguson	153,328	36.8
Libertarian	Ben Boren	6,310	1.5
Total votes		416,219	100.0
Republican hold			

=== 2022 ===
Michigan's 1st congressional district, 2022
Party	Candidate	Votes	%
Republican	Jack Bergman (incumbent)	233,094	59.9
Democratic	Bob Lorinser	145,403	37.4
Working Class	Liz Hakola	5,510	1.4
Libertarian	Andrew Gale	4,592	1.1
Total votes		388,599	100.0
Republican hold			

=== 2024 ===
Michigan's 1st congressional district, 2024
Party	Candidate	Votes	%
Republican	Jack Bergman (incumbent)	282,264	59.2
Democratic	Callie Barr	180,937	37.9
Working Class	Liz Hakola	8,497	1.8
Libertarian	Andrew Gale	5,486	1.2
Total votes		477,184	100.0
Republican hold			

== See also ==
- Michigan's congressional districts
- List of United States congressional districts
- Superior (proposed state)
