= Bradley F. Granger =

American politician (1825–1882)

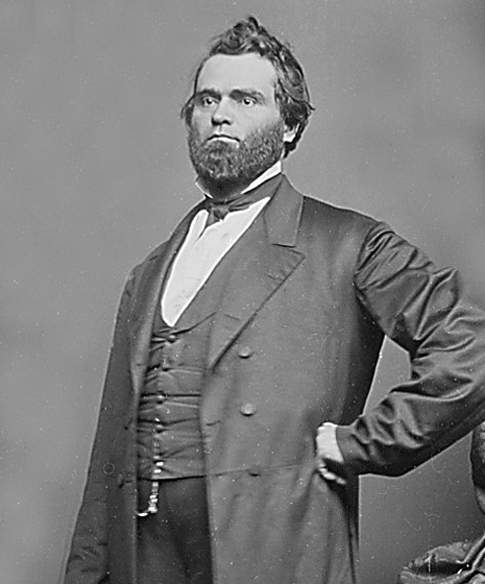
- Granger circa 1862

Member of the U.S. House of Representatives from Michigan's 1st district
- In office March 4, 1861 – March 3, 1863
- Preceded by: William Alanson Howard
- Succeeded by: Fernando C. Beaman

Personal details
- Born: Bradley Francis Granger; March 12, 1825 Lowville, New York, U.S.
- Died: November 4, 1882 (aged 57) Ann Arbor, Michigan, U.S.
- Party: Republican
- Spouse: Susan A. De Lamater (m. 1848)
- Children: 5

Bradley Francis Granger (March 12, 1825 – November 4, 1882) was an American politician and a United States representative from the U.S. state of Michigan.

== Early life ==
Granger was born in Lowville, New York and attended the public schools. At the age of fifteen he began the study of law with Stacy & Beaman, at Tecumseh, Lenawee county, Michigan, until he reached his majority and was admitted to the bar on October 12, 1847.

== Career ==
Granger commenced practice in Tecumseh, Michigan, and in the summer of 1847 he moved to Kent county, and engaged in farming and lumbering, but returned to Manchester in the spring of 1848. In the spring of 1849, he was elected Justice of the Peace, and served for four years while owning and operating a farm. He continued to practice after moving to Ann Arbor, Washtenaw County, Michigan, and served as clerk of Washtenaw county in 1852 and Judge of Probate in 1856.

Elected as a Republican from Michigan's 1st congressional district to the Thirty-seventh Congress, Granger served as United States Representative from March 4, 1861 to March 3, 1863. He continued in the practice of law until his death.

== Death ==
Granger died in Ann Arbor, Washtenaw County, Michigan, November 4, 1882.

== Family life ==
In October 1848, Granger married Susan A. De Lamater, niece of Hon. William J. Hough. The couple had five children, one of whom died in infancy.

U.S. House of Representatives
Preceded by William Alanson Howard	United States Representative for the 1st congressional district of Michigan; 1861– 1863	Succeeded by Fernando C. Beaman
