= Moses W. Field =

American politician (1828–1889)

Moses Wheelock Field
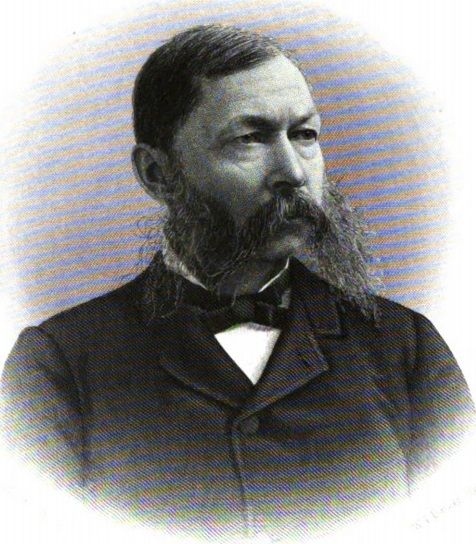
- From Volume 2 of 1889's The History of Detroit and Michigan

Member of the U.S. House of Representatives from Michigan's 1st district
- In office March 4, 1873 – March 3, 1875
- Preceded by: Henry Waldron
- Succeeded by: Alpheus S. Williams

Personal details
- Born: February 10, 1828 Watertown, New York, U.S.
- Died: March 14, 1889 (aged 61) Hamtramck Michigan, U.S.
- Resting place: Woodmere Cemetery; Detroit, Michigan, U.S.
- Party: Republican; Greenback Party
- Spouse: Mary Kercheval Field
- Children: Vincent Field; Alice Field; Mary Field
- Parent(s): William Field; Rebecca (Wheelock) Field
- Profession: Businessman; Politician

Moses Wheelock Field (February 10, 1828 – March 14, 1889) was a businessman and politician. He served as a member of the United States House of Representatives from the U.S. state of Michigan, and was instrumental in organizing the Independent Greenback Party.

== Early life and education ==
Field was born in Watertown, New York, the son of William Field and Rebecca (Wheelock) Field. He moved with his parents to Cato, New York, and attended public schools. He graduated from the academy in Victor, New York

In 1844, he moved to Detroit, Michigan, and engaged in mercantile and agricultural pursuits. Here he married Mary Kercheval whose father, Benjamin Kercheval (1793-1855), had been an officer in the War of 1812. He built a house beyond the then eastern limits of Detroit, at a location where it would be placed on Field Avenue (named for him) later, which his mother-in-law thought was too far from the center of town. He operated the Detroit Glass Works and the Detroit Hoop Manufacturing Company. In 1865, he was instrumental in establishing the Michigan State Society for the Prevention of Cruelty to Animals, and helped create state laws relating to the humane treatment of animals. He is credited with helping establish an art museum in Detroit, and helping establish public drinking fountains in Detroit in 1871. Field served as Alderman of Detroit from 1863 to 1865.

== Career ==
He was elected as a Republican candidate from Michigan's 1st congressional district to the 43rd Congress, serving from March 4, 1873, to March 3, 1875. He was an unsuccessful candidate for re-election in 1874 to the Forty-fourth Congress.

Field was instrumental in organizing the Independent Greenback Party, having called the national convention at Indianapolis, Indiana, on May 17, 1876. Governor Josiah Begole appointed him a trustee of the Eastern Asylum for the Insane in 1883.

In 1888, Field was elected to an eight-year term as Regent of the University of Michigan. He died on March 14, 1889, before completing the term.

At the time of his death, he lived on his farm, "Linden Lawn," (where Field Avenue would later be built) in the township of Hamtramck, a still largely rural area to the east of the city of Detroit. Most of that township would later be annexed into Detroit, including where Field lived. He is interred in Woodmere Cemetery.

== Personal life ==
On February 2, 1858, Field married Mary Kercheval. They had ten children, including Vincent Field, Alice Field and Mary Field. His family were members of the Swedenborgian Church.

U.S. House of Representatives
Preceded by Henry Waldron	United States Representative for the 1st congressional district of Michigan; 1873– 1875	Succeeded by Alpheus S. Williams
