= New Bedford, New Jersey =

Populated place in Monmouth County, New Jersey, US

- Unincorporated community
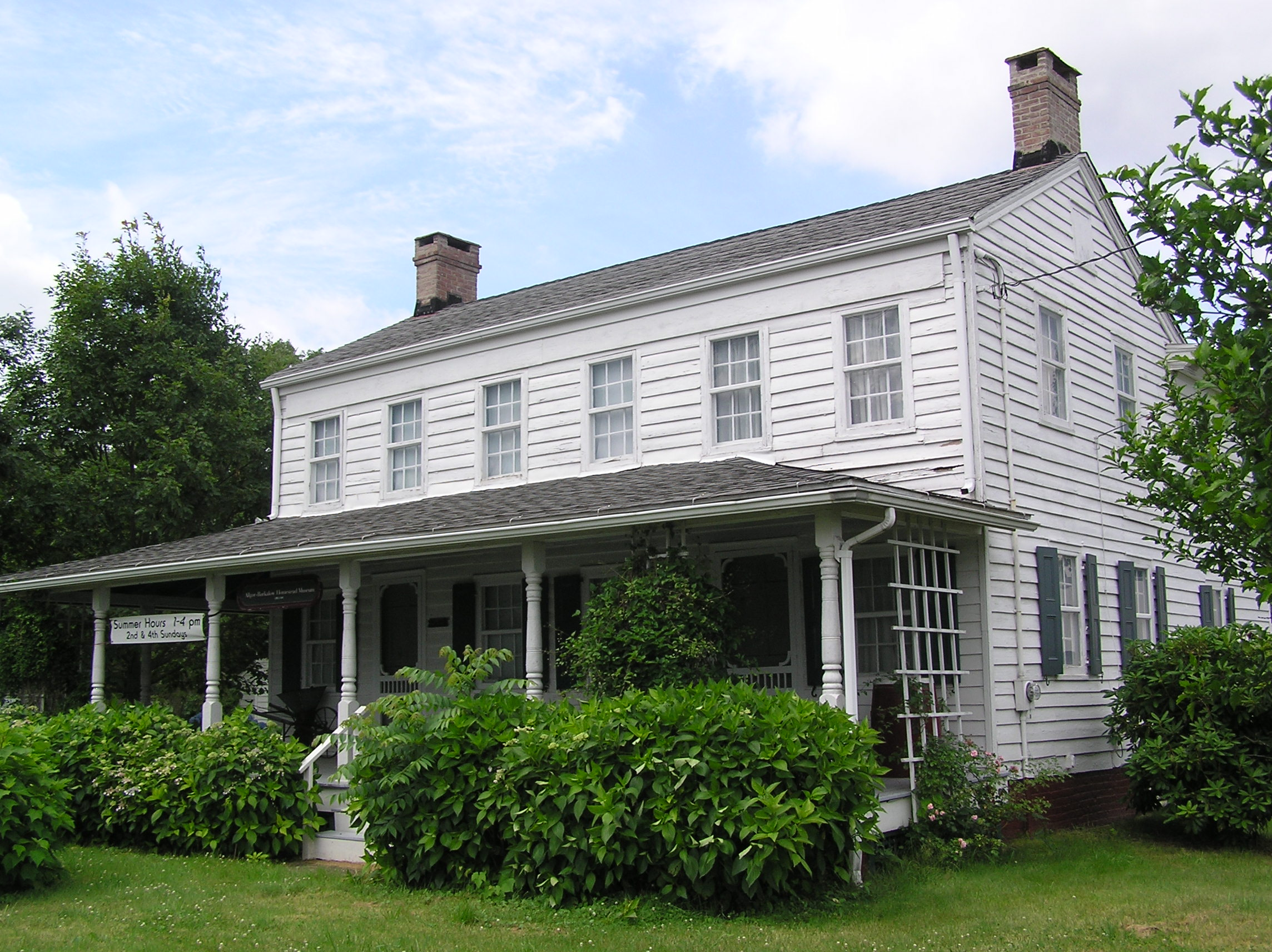
- Allgor–Barkalow Homestead, listed on the National Register of Historic Places

- Location in Monmouth County. Inset: Location of county within the state of New Jersey New Bedford (New Jersey) New Bedford (the United States)
- Coordinates: 40°10′45″N 74°03′43″W
- Country: United States
- State: New Jersey
- County: Monmouth
- Township: Wall
- Elevation: 69 ft (21 m)
- GNIS feature ID: 882298

New Bedford is an unincorporated community located within Wall Township in Monmouth County, in the U.S. state of New Jersey.

== Notable people ==
People who were born in, residents of, or otherwise closely associated with New Bedford include:

- George B. Cooper (1808–1866), politician who was elected to the United States House of Representatives in 1858, but left office after a year when Congress awarded the seat to his opponent in 1860.
