= David A. Noble =

American politician

Member of the U.S. House of Representatives from Michigan's 2nd district
- In office March 4, 1853 – March 3, 1855
- Preceded by: Charles E. Stuart
- Succeeded by: Henry Waldron

Personal details
- Born: November 9, 1802 Williamstown, Massachusetts, U.S.
- Died: October 13, 1876 (aged 73) Monroe, Michigan, U.S.
- Party: Democratic
- Education: Williams College

David Addison Noble (November 9, 1802 – October 13, 1876) was a politician and judge from the U.S. state of Michigan who served a term in Congress from 1853 to 1855.

Noble was born in Williamstown, Massachusetts. He attended a private school in Plainfield and graduated from Williams College in Williamstown in 1825. He studied law in Albany and New York City and was admitted to the bar in 1831. That same year he commenced practice in New York City and then moved to Monroe, Michigan, continuing the practice of law.

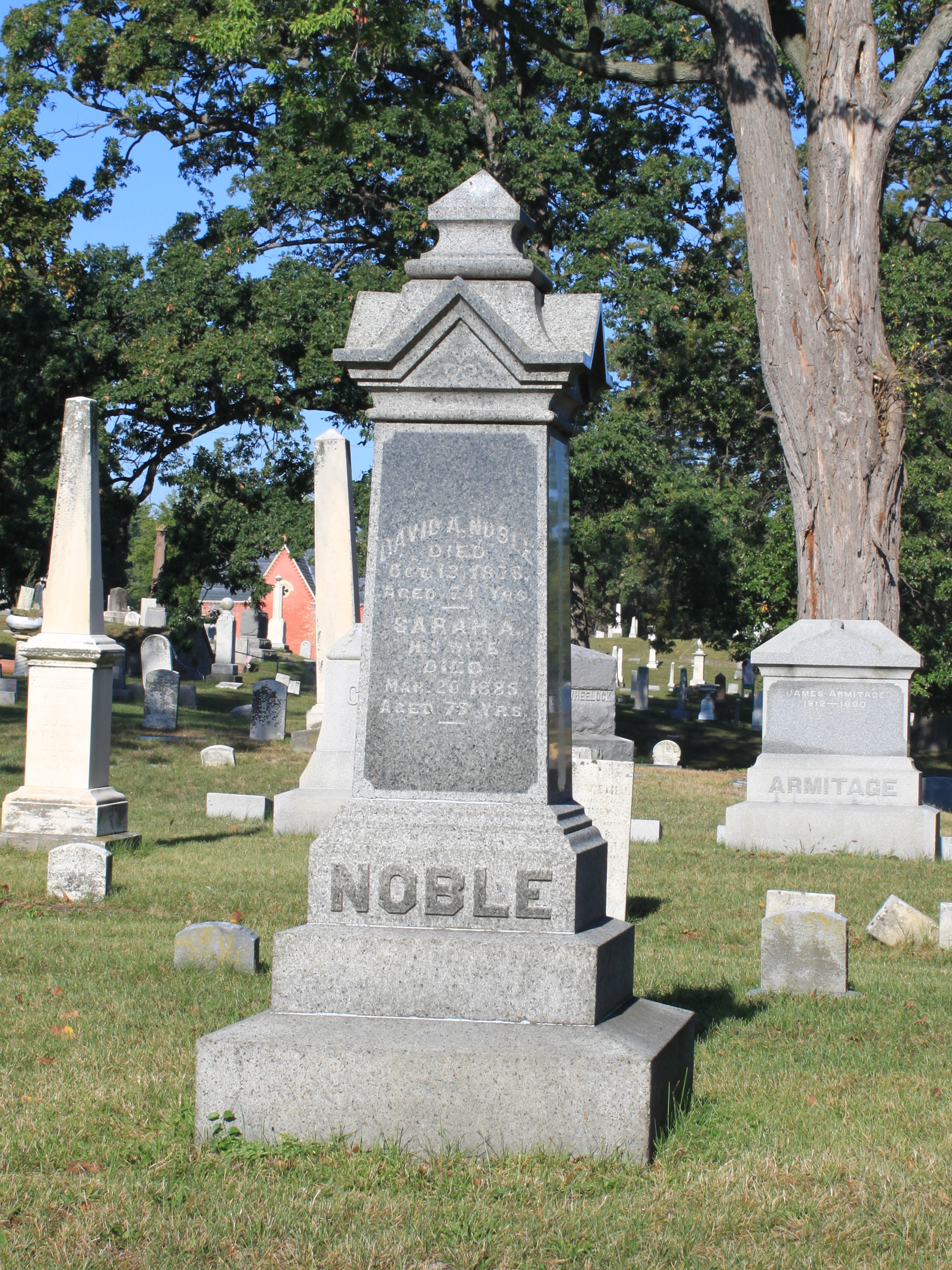
Noble grave

In Monroe, Noble served as city recorder in 1838, 1839, and 1844–1850, as mayor in 1852 and served two terms as alderman. He was a member of the Michigan House of Representatives from 1847 to 1848. He was also prosecuting attorney and probate judge of Monroe County.

In 1854, Noble was elected as a Democrat from Michigan's 2nd congressional district to the 33rd United States Congress, serving from March 4, 1853, to March 3, 1855. He was an unsuccessful candidate for re-election in 1854 to the Thirty-fourth Congress, losing to Republican Henry Waldron in the general election.

In 1858, Noble was appointed manager of the Louisville, New Albany & Chicago Railroad and served four years. He served as a delegate to the 1864 Democratic National Convention.

David A. Noble died in Monroe, Michigan, and was interred in Woodland Cemetery. He was the father of Henry Shaw Noble and John Savage Noble.

U.S. House of Representatives
| Preceded by Charles E. Stuart | United States Representative for the 2nd congressional district of Michigan; 1853– 1855 | Succeeded by Henry Waldron |
