= William L. Stoughton =

Union Army officer and politician (1827–1888)

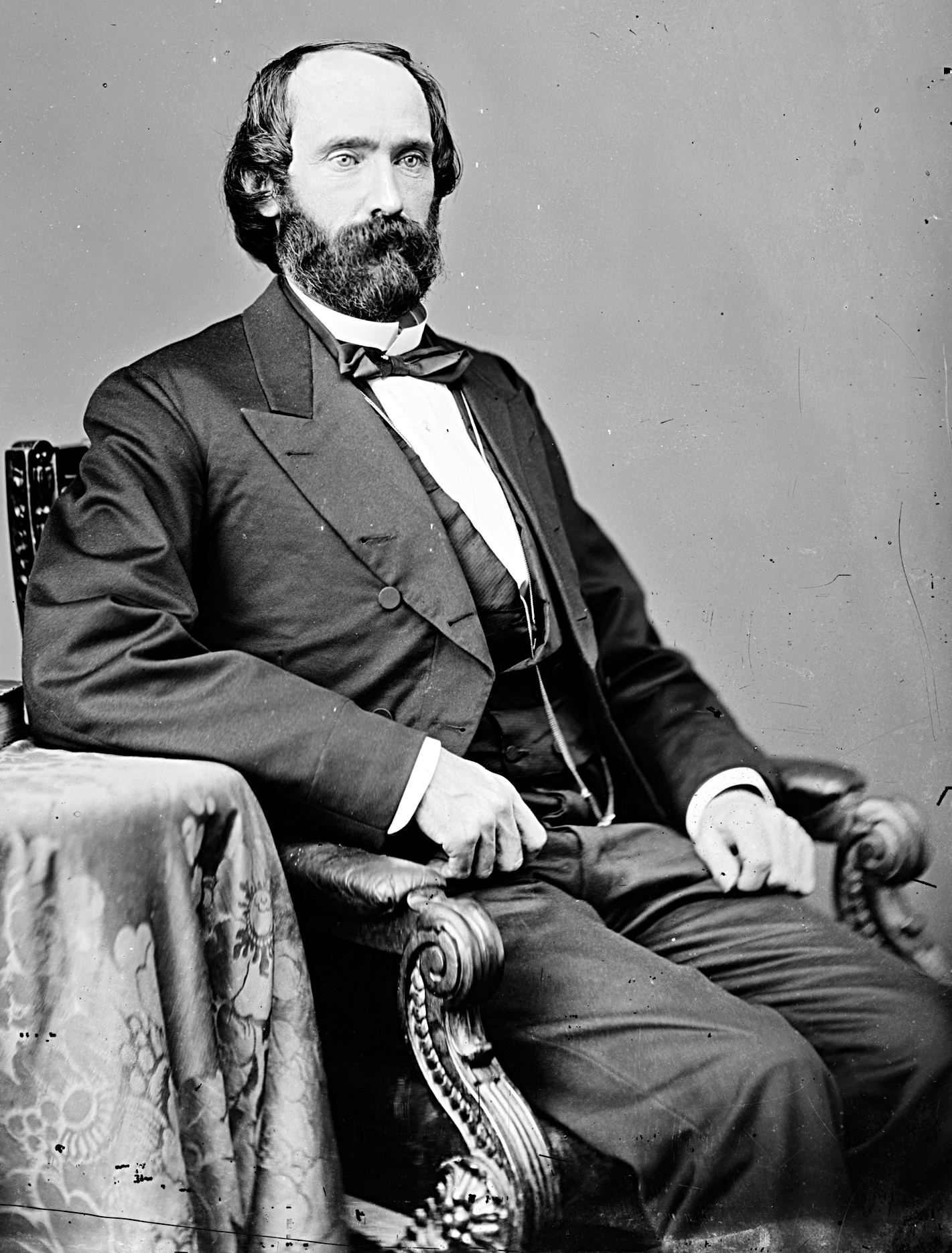
- Born: March 20, 1827; Bangor, New York, U.S.
- Died: June 6, 1888 (aged 61); Sturgis, Michigan, U.S.
- Burial place: Oaklawn Cemetery; Sturgis, Michigan
- Military career
- Allegiance: United States of America; Union
- Branch: United States Army; Union Army
- Service years: 1861–1864
- Rank: Colonel; Brevet Major General
- Commands: 11th Michigan Infantry Regiment; 2nd Brigade, 2nd Division, XIV Corps, Army of the Cumberland
- Conflicts: American Civil War; Battle of Stones River; Battle of Chickamauga; Battle of Chattanooga
- Other work: United States Congressman; lawyer

William Lewis Stoughton (March 20, 1827 – June 6, 1888) was a politician and soldier from U.S. state of Michigan who served in the United States Congress, as well as serving as an officer and brigade commander in the Union Army during the American Civil War.

== Biography ==
Stoughton was born in Bangor, New York. He attended Kirtland, Painesville, and Madison Academies in Lake County, Ohio. He studied law in Ohio, Indiana, and Michigan from 1849 to 1851 when he was admitted to the bar and commenced practice in Sturgis, Michigan.

Stoughton was a prosecuting attorney of St. Joseph County from 1855 to 1859 and a delegate to the 1860 Republican National Convention. He was appointed by President Abraham Lincoln as United States District Attorney for the District of Michigan in March 1861, but resigned a few months later to enter the Union Army following the outbreak of the Civil War.

He served as colonel of the 11th Michigan Infantry. Stoughton commanded the 2nd Brigade, 1st Division of the XIV Corps of the Army of the Cumberland at the Battle of Chattanooga. He resigned in August 1864 because of ill health and resumed the practice of his profession in Sturgis, Michigan, in 1865. On February 28, 1867, President Andrew Johnson nominated Stoughton for appointment to the grade of brevet major general of volunteers, to rank from March 13, 1865, and the United States Senate confirmed the appointment on March 2, 1867.

In 1867, Stoughton became a member of the Michigan State Constitutional convention and served as Michigan Attorney General from 1867 to 1868. He was elected as a Republican from Michigan's 2nd congressional district to the 41st and 42nd Congresses, serving from March 4, 1869 to March 3, 1873. He returned to the practice of law in 1874.

William L. Stoughton died in Sturgis and was interred in Oak Lawn Cemetery.

== See also ==
- 11th Michigan Volunteer Infantry Regiment
- List of American Civil War brevet generals (Union)

== Notes ==
Legal offices
Preceded by Albert Williams	Michigan Attorney General; 1867–1868	Succeeded by Dwight May
U.S. House of Representatives
Preceded by Charles Upson	United States Representative for the 2nd congressional district of Michigan; 1869–1873	Succeeded by Henry Waldron
