= Waldemar Kaempffert =

Journalist and museum director

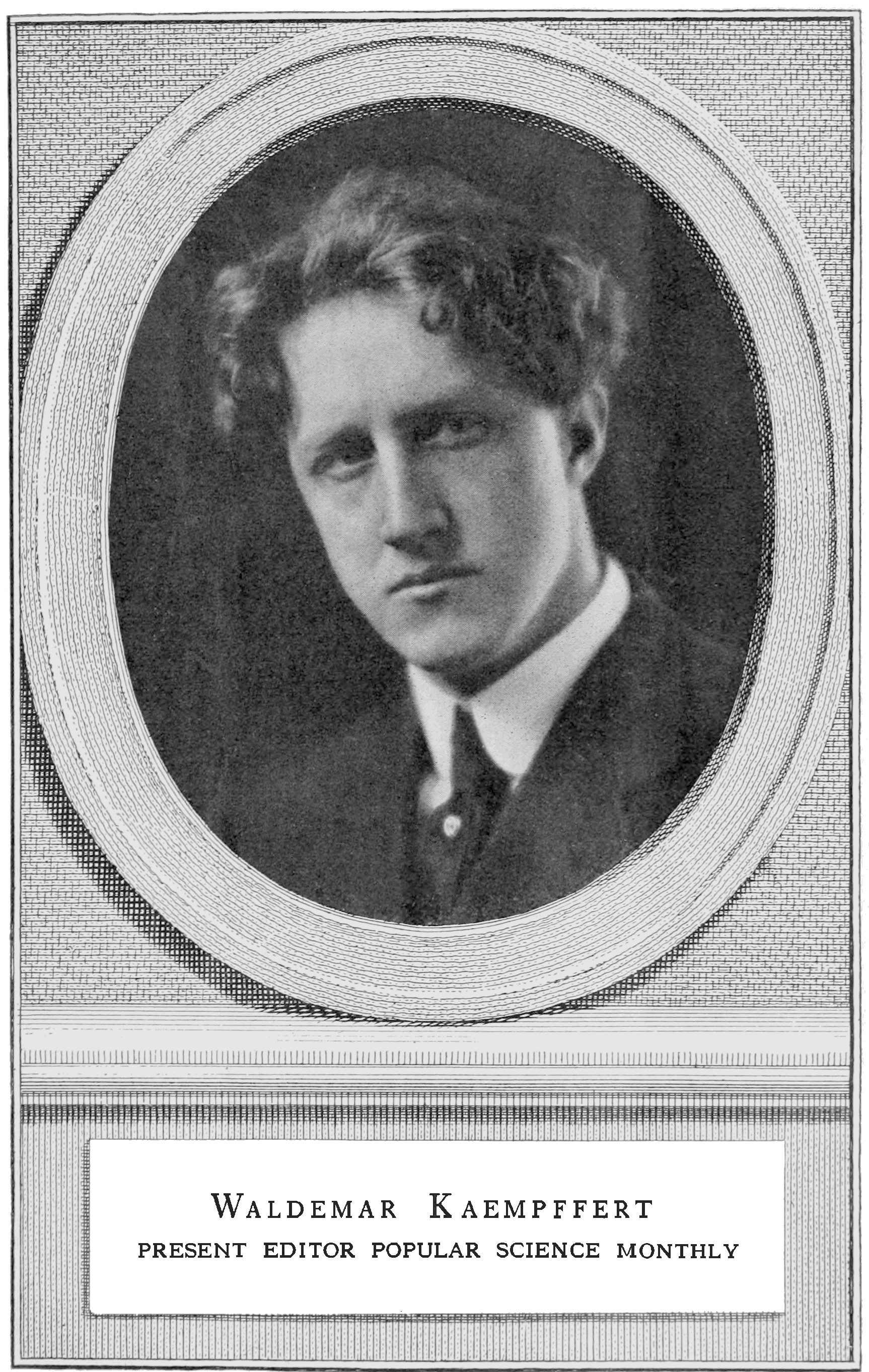
- Born: September 27, 1877; New York City, United States
- Died: November 27, 1956 (aged 79); New York City, United States
- Occupation: Science writer

Waldemar Bernhard Kaempffert (September 27, 1877 - November 27, 1956) was an American science writer and museum director.

== Career ==
Waldemar (Bernhard) Kaempffert was born in New York City to Bernhard and Juliette Kaempffert, both of German descent. He graduated Phi Beta Kappa from the City College of New York with a bachelor of science in 1897. Thereafter, he was employed by Scientific American, first as a translator (1897–1900), then as managing editor (1900–1916). He also wrote articles about science for other publications during this time, including three articles for Harper's, beginning in 1908. In 1916, he started working as the editor of Popular Science Monthly.

In 1922, he began writing essays about science for The New York Times, where he was named Editor of Science and Engineering in 1927. During the 1920s, he also wrote free-lance magazine articles. in a June 1924 essay for Forum magazine, "The Social Destiny of Radio," he addressed a non-technical audience, discussing where radio had been and how it was changing American life.

In 1928, following a nationwide search for a director, the Museum of Science and Industry Chicago asked Kaempffert to become its first director. He enthusiastically devoted himself to the work of laying out the history of the sciences and of the industries. He encouraged his curators and exhibit designers to base their exhibits on careful research in order to be as objectively truthful as possible. This devotion to objectivity, however, led to disputes with the board of directors, especially around the appointment of George Ranney, who was also a director of International Harvester. This appointment created an apparent conflict of interest in the museum, as International Harvester was contributing to an exhibit on farm tractors that claimed that an IH predecessor company was responsible for the invention of the tractor. Research by both Kaempffert and his staff showed otherwise, but he could not antagonize donors to the museum nor his board of directors.

The board also found issue with Kaempffert's cost accounting. The board, all business executives, kept careful track of every dollar spent. Kaempffert, however, was more lax in his accounting. No wrongdoing was alleged, but the board wanted greater oversight. To achieve that, the board created a new layer of management, "assistant directors," who reported not only to Kaempffert but also directly to the Board. It was this usurpation of Kaempffert's authority that led him to ask The New York Times in January 1931 if he could have his old job back which was agreed. He remained with The New York Times until his retirement in 1956. He was succeeded as science editor by William L. Laurence.

In 1956, Kaempffert reported on climate change in The New York Times. He said: “Coal and oil are still plentiful and cheap in many parts of the world, and there is every reason to believe that both will be consumed by industry so long as it pays to do so.”

Kaempffert was a member of the American Society of Mechanical Engineers, History of Science Society, National Association of Science Writers (serving as the president in 1937), and the Newcomen Society. He was also a member of the Peabody Awards Board of Jurors from 1940 to 1956.

Kaempffert was a member of the American Society for Psychical Research, an organisation dedicated to parapsychology. He was a friend of the parapsychologists James H. Hyslop and Walter Franklin Prince. Kaempffert wrote a supportive review of J. B. Rhine's book Extrasensory Perception (1934) in The New York Times. In 1916, he vigorously defended the Martian canals theory against skeptics.

His obituary in The New York Times said his death, on November 27, 1956, was the result of a stroke. He was 79. On January 7, 1911, Kaempffert married Carolyn Lydia Yeaton. She died in 1933.

== Awards ==
- Kalinga Prize (1954)
