= Seymour H. Person =

American politician (1879–1957)

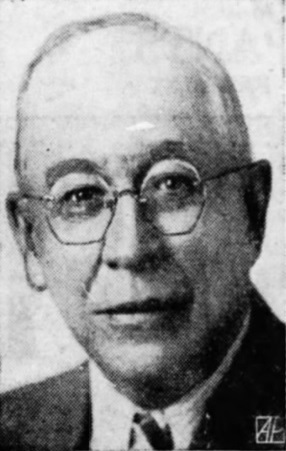

Member of the U.S. House of Representatives from Michigan's 6th district
- In office March 4, 1931 – March 3, 1933
- Preceded by: Grant M. Hudson
- Succeeded by: Claude E. Cady

Personal details
- Born: February 2, 1879 Howell, Michigan
- Died: April 7, 1957 (aged 78) Lansing, Michigan
- Party: Republican

Seymour Howe Person (February 2, 1879 – April 7, 1957) was a politician from the U.S. state of Michigan.

Person was born on a farm near Howell, Michigan and attended the district schools and the Howell public schools. He graduated from the law department of the University of Michigan at Ann Arbor in 1901. He was admitted to the bar the same year and commenced practice in Lansing and was a law partner with Patrick H. Kelley.

Person served as a member of the Michigan House of Representatives (Ingham County 1st district) from 1915 to 1921 and also served in the Michigan Senate (14th district) from 1927 to 1931. He was a delegate to all State conventions for thirty years. He was the brother-in-law of Supreme Court Justice Wiley Rutledge.

In 1930 Republican Party primary elections, Person defeated the incumbent U.S. Representative Grant M. Hudson. Person went on to win the general election to represent Michigan's 6th congressional district in the 72nd United States Congress, serving from March 4, 1931 to March 3, 1933. He was an unsuccessful candidate for reelection in 1932, losing to Democrat Claude E. Cady. He also unsuccessfully challenged incumbent William W. Blackney in the Republican primary election of 1942.

Seymour H. Person resumed the practice of his profession after leaving Congress. He died in Lansing and is interred in Deepdale Cemetery.

U.S. House of Representatives
Preceded by Grant M. Hudson	United States Representative for the 6th congressional district of Michigan; 1931 – 1933	Succeeded by Claude E. Cady
