= Kit Clardy =

American politician

Kit Francis Clardy
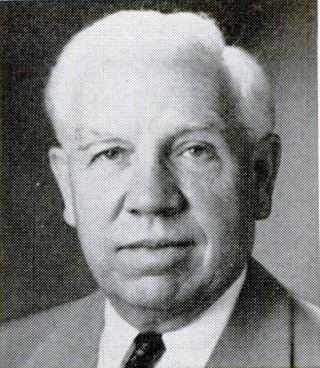

Member of the U.S. House of Representatives from Michigan's 6th district
- In office January 3, 1953 – January 3, 1955
- Preceded by: William W. Blackney
- Succeeded by: Donald Hayworth

Personal details
- Born: June 17, 1892 Butler, Missouri
- Died: September 5, 1961 (aged 69) Palos Verdes Estates, California
- Party: Republican
- Education: University of Michigan Law School
- Profession: Attorney

Kit Francis Clardy (June 17, 1892 – September 5, 1961) was an American politician from the U.S. state of Michigan. He was also known as Michigan's McCarthy, referring to his affinity for the controversial anti-communist U.S. Senator Joseph McCarthy.

== Early life ==
Clardy was born in Butler, Missouri, and afterwards moved with his family first to Kansas City, Missouri, and then in 1907 to a farm near Liberty, Missouri. He attended schools in Butler, Kansas City, and Liberty, and the William Jewell College in Liberty. He graduated from the University of Michigan Law School at Ann Arbor in 1925 and was admitted to the bar in the same year. He practiced law in Ionia, 1925–1927; served as assistant attorney general of Michigan, 1927–1931; and was a member and chairman of the Michigan Public Utilities Commission from 1931–1934. Clardy reentered the private practice of law in 1934.

== Political career ==
In 1950, Clardy lost to incumbent William W. Blackney in the Republican primary contest for the U.S. House of Representatives for Michigan's 6th congressional district. In 1952, Clardy won the Republican nomination after Blackney's retirement, and went on to defeat Democrat Donald Hayworth in the general election. He served a single term in the 83rd Congress, from January 3, 1953 until January 3, 1955.

While in Congress, Clardy shared Senator Joseph McCarthy's anti-communist sentiments and participated in House Committee on Un-American Activities (HUAC) hearings. Clardy conducted HUAC hearings in May 1954 in Lansing, Michigan, in which the committee subpoenaed University of Michigan mathematics instructor Chandler Davis, pharmacology professor Mark Nickerson, and zoology professor Clement Markert.

Also in May 1954 he conducted another HUAC hearing in Flint, Michigan, in which he reportedly "not only abused the witnesses but incited violence against them." Recalling how in 1937 college youths had thrown union organizers for the UAW-CIO into the Red Cedar River. He said, "I was proud of those kids. They should also have tossed into the river the then Governor, the late Frank Murphy." Reportedly, "Clardy's conduct of the hearing contributed to the lynch spirit which swept the city. A number of workers were dragged from their jobs in automobile plants by lynch gangs and beaten; hostile witnesses were evicted from their homes; their families had to go into hiding to escape the fury of mob hoodlums; the office of the lawyer for the witnesses was smeared with red paint."

Clardy was defeated in the general election by Hayworth in 1954. In 1956, Clardy lost the Republican primary to Charles E. Chamberlain, who went on to defeat Hayworth in the general election.

== Later life ==
In 1956 Clardy moved to Palos Verdes Estates, California, where he resided until his death there in 1961. He is interred in Forest Lawn Memorial Park, Glendale, California.

== See also ==
- List of members of the House Un-American Activities Committee

U.S. House of Representatives
Preceded by William W. Blackney	United States Representative for the 6th congressional district of Michigan; 1953 – 1955	Succeeded by Donald Hayworth
