= Mount Hope Cemetery (Lansing, Michigan) =

Cemetery in Lansing, Michigan

- Interactive map of Mount Hope Cemetery

Details
- Established: 1874
- Location: 1709 E. Mount Hope Ave, Lansing, Michigan
- Country: United States
- Coordinates: 42.71167748°N 84.52708125°W
- No. of graves: ≈24,000
- Website: https://www.lansingmi.gov/449/Mt-Hope-Cemetery
- Find a Grave: Mount Hope Cemetery

Mount Hope Cemetery is a cemetery in Lansing, Michigan.

== History ==
Mount Hope Cemetery opened as the new city cemetery for Lansing, Michigan in June 1874. It was formerly the John Miller Farm. Between 1874 and 1881, the city vacated the Lansing City Cemetery and moved about 1,000 graves to Mount Hope.

Frederick W. Higgins, superintendent of Detroit's Woodmere Cemetery, planned the drives and Henry Lee Bancroft, superintendent of the Lansing City Cemetery, developed the landscape.

A section was platted in 1874 for the State Reform School (later the Boys' Vocational School) for the remains of 61 boys who died between 1856 and 1933.

The city's Civil War Soldier's Monument, a large obelisk, was dedicated in 1878.

In 2014, a grave marker for the final victim of the 1927 Bath School bombing was dedicated.

As of 2017, there were 23,820 people buried at Mount Hope Cemetery.

== Notable burials ==
- Warren Babcock (1866–1913), postmaster
- L. Anna Ballard (1848–1934), physician
- William James Beal (1833–1924), botanist
- Willard I. Bowerman Jr. (1917–1987), state politician and mayor of Lansing
- Claude E. Cady (1878–1953), member of the U.S. House of Representatives
- Sherlock Houston Carmer (1842–1884), state politician
- John Herrmann (1900–1959), writer
- Grant M. Hudson (1868–1955), member of the U.S. House of Representatives
- Irma Theoda Jones (1845–1929), philanthropist
- Patrick H. Kelley (1867–1925), member of the U.S. House of Representatives
- John W. Longyear (1820–1875), jurist and member of the U.S. House of Representatives
- Martin V. Montgomery (1840–1898), judge
- Jack Morrissey (1876–1936), professional baseball player
- Ransom E. Olds (1864–1950), automotive industry leader
- George E. Ranney (1839–1915), Civil War surgeon and Medal of Honor recipient
- James Munroe Turner (1850–1896), state politician and mayor of Lansing
- Scott Turner (1880–1972), director of the U.S. Bureau of Mines
- Howard Wiest (1864–1945), Chief Justice of the Michigan Supreme Court
- Edward W. Sparrow (1846–1913), Lansing Developer and founder of Sparrow Hospital

== See also ==
- List of cemeteries in Michigan
