= Grant M. Hudson =

American politician (1868–1955)

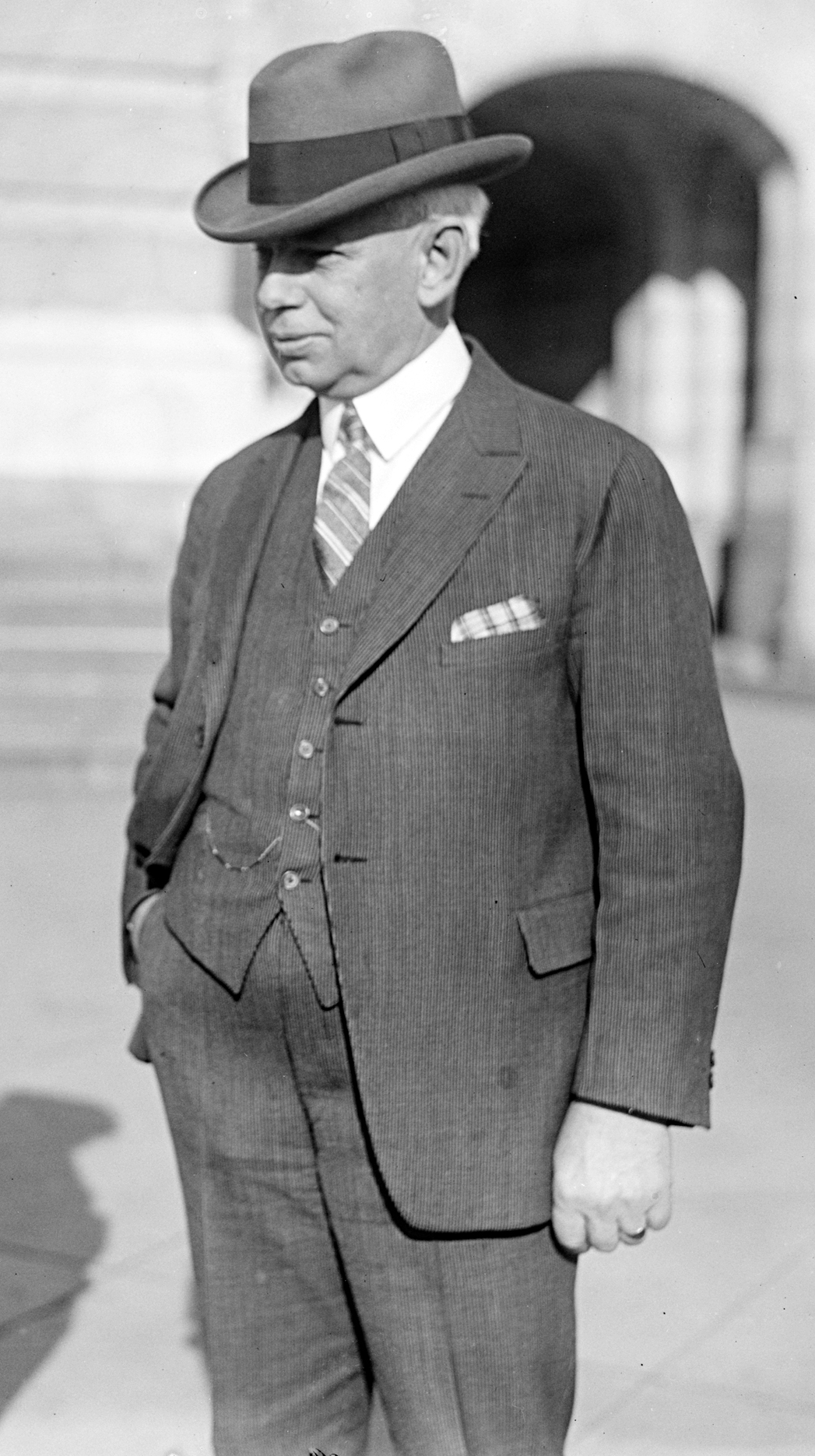

Member of the U.S. House of Representatives from Michigan's 6th district
- In office March 4, 1923 – March 3, 1931
- Preceded by: Patrick H. Kelley
- Succeeded by: Seymour H. Person

Personal details
- Born: July 23, 1868 Eaton Township, Lorain County, Ohio, U.S.
- Died: October 26, 1955 (aged 87) Kalamazoo, Michigan, U.S.
- Resting place: Mount Hope Cemetery; Lansing, Michigan, U.S.
- Party: Republican

Grant Martin Hudson (July 23, 1868 – October 26, 1955) was a politician from the U.S. state of Michigan.

Hudson was born in Eaton Township, Lorain County, Ohio. He attended the common schools and graduated from Kalamazoo College, Kalamazoo, Michigan. He also attended the University of Chicago. He was a minister at Dowagiac, Michigan, 1894–1896, and engaged in mercantile pursuits in Schoolcraft, Michigan, in 1896. He was a member of the Michigan House of Representatives, 1905–1909, and was president of the village of Schoolcraft, 1909–1911. He was a member of the State industrial accident compensation commission in 1920 and 1921.

Hudson was elected as a Republican from Michigan's 6th congressional district to the 68th United States Congress and to the three succeeding Congresses, serving from March 4, 1923 to March 3, 1931). He served as chairman, Committee on Alcoholic Liquor Traffic in the 69th Congress. He was an unsuccessful candidate for renomination in 1930, losing to Seymour H. Person in the Republican primary election.

Hudson engaged in the insurance business in Lansing, Michigan. He was State purchasing agent in 1939 and State tax commissioner in 1940. Hudson died in Kalamazoo and was interred in Mount Hope Cemetery in Lansing.

U.S. House of Representatives
| Preceded by Patrick H. Kelley | United States Representative for the 6th congressional district of Michigan; 1923–1931 | Succeeded by Seymour H. Person |
