= Sherlock Houston Carmer =

American politician (1842–1884)

Member of the Michigan House of Representatives from the Ingham County 1st district
- In office January 1, 1881 – 1882

Personal details
- Born: January 29, 1842 Portage County, Ohio, U.S.
- Died: December 30, 1884 (aged 42) Lansing, Michigan, U.S.
- Resting place: Mount Hope Cemetery; Lansing, Michigan, U.S.
- Party: Independent
- Spouse: Mary

Sherlock Houston Carmer (January 29, 1842 – December 30, 1884) was a Michigan politician. He served as a member of the Michigan House of Representatives from 1881 to 1882.

Carmer was born on January 29, 1842, in Portage County, Ohio. In 1869, he moved to Lansing, Michigan. Carmer died on December 30, 1884, aged 42, of pneumonia. He was interred in Mount Hope Cemetery in Lansing.
