= Irma Theoda Jones =

American philanthropist (1845–1929)

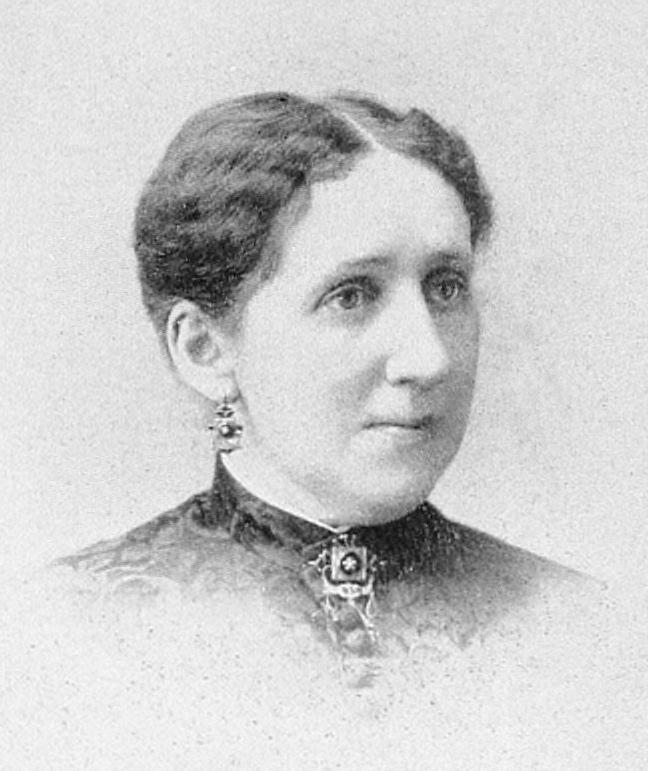
Irma Theoda Jones, "A Woman of the Century"

Irma Theoda Jones (née, Andrews; March 11, 1845 – June 1929) was a philanthropist and a pioneer resident of Lansing, Michigan. Her work was among women's clubs and the temperance union. She was also a contributor to various newspapers.

== Early life ==
Irma Theoda Andrews was born in Victory, New York, on March 11, 1845. Her ancestors were among the pioneers of western New York, with a strong mixture of German blood on the father's side. Her mother, Mrs. N. Andrews, was a woman of remarkable executive ability and was the matron of an industrial school. In 1849 her father, a physician, moved his family to Rockford, Illinois.

Anna Peck Sill had just then opened the Rockford Female Seminary (now Rockford University), to which a primary department was attached, wherein Irma Theoda Jones, five years old, began her studies. The study of languages was her specialty.

== Career ==
After teaching a year, in July 1863, Jones moved to Lansing, Michigan, where her uncle, John A. Kerr, held the position of State printer and was the publisher of the Lansing Republican.

Jones was a contributor to various newspapers, her most influential work was in connection with the Lansing Woman's Club, of which she was one of the originators and president from 1885 to 1887, and also with the Woman's Christian Temperance Union in the days following the crusade movement, with the rise of the Young Women's Christian Association and with the Lansing Industrial Aid Society, of which she was the president. The Lansing Industrial Aid Society had for its object the permanent uplifting of the poor, and maintained a weekly school for teaching sewing, cooking and practical lessons in domestic economy to the children of the needy.

She was the second president of the Michigan Federation of Women's Clubs.

She was an early member of the Plymouth Congretional church and was one of the organizers of the Pilgrim Congregational Church.

In 1892, she became editor of the literary club department of the Mid Continent, a monthly magazine published in Lansing.

== Personal life ==
On May 9, 1865, she married Nelson B. Jones, a prominent and public-spirited citizen of Lansing. They had four sons and one daughter. One daughter died in infancy.

Irma Theoda Jones died in June 1929 and is buried at Mount Hope Cemetery in Lansing.
