= Alexander Maitland (Michigan politician) =

American politician (1844–1929)

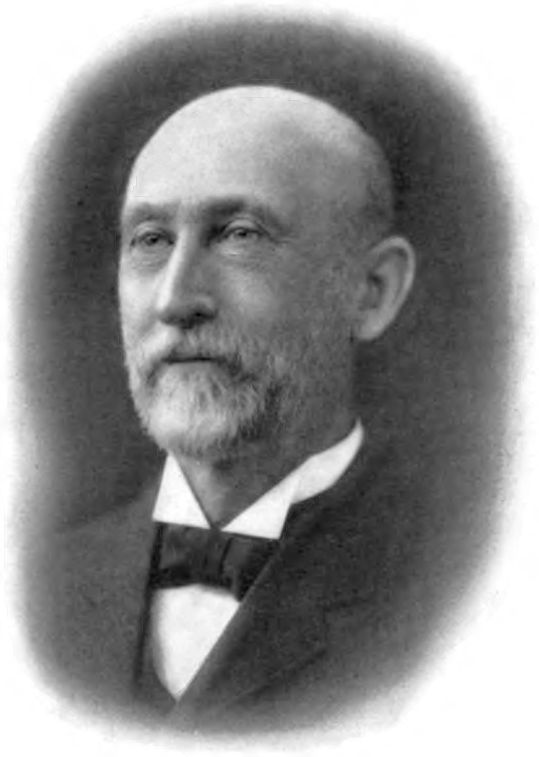
Alexander Maitland

Alexander Maitland (June 20, 1844 – January 1, 1929) was a 32nd lieutenant governor of Michigan from 1903 to 1906.

== Early and family life ==
Maitland was born in Kilmarnock, Scotland, in 1844, to James and Barbara (Kerr) Maitland. In 1856, the family moved to Hamilton, Ontario, Canada, then later to Hastings County, Ontario, where they engaged in farming. Maitland began his schooling in Scotland, and continued it while working on the family farm. In 1862, he moved to Galt, Ontario, for work, and then immigrated to the United States in 1864. He settled in Negaunee, Michigan, working for the Chicago and North Western Railway. Maitland married Caroline V. Sterling on June 10, 1874, from Utica, New York. The couple had five children: Alexander F., Katherine, Leslie M., Harvey K. and Rena. Maitland was a member of the Freemasons and his wife a member of the Order of the Eastern Star.

== Employment ==
He later served as general manager of the Iron Cliffs Mining Company and the mining division of Republic Iron and Steel Company, and supervisor for the Cambra and Lillie Mining Company. Maitland later served as president of the Black River Mining Company, the North Lake Mineral Land Company and the First National Bank of Negaunee, as well as holding stock in several other banks. He is considered one of the pioneer settlers of Michigan's Upper Peninsula.

== Public service ==
Maitland was first elected as county surveyor, where he served two terms, and then mayor of his home town, where he served three terms. In 1896, he was elected as the state senator for his district, and later won a second term. He was elected lieutenant governor in 1902, under Governor Aaron T. Bliss, and again in 1904, under Governor Fred M. Warner. Maitland and both governors with whom he served were affiliated with the Republican Party.

Political offices
Preceded by Orrin W. Robinson	Lieutenant Governor of Michigan; 1903–1907	Succeeded by Patrick H. Kelley
