= Patrick H. Kelley =

American politician (1867–1925)

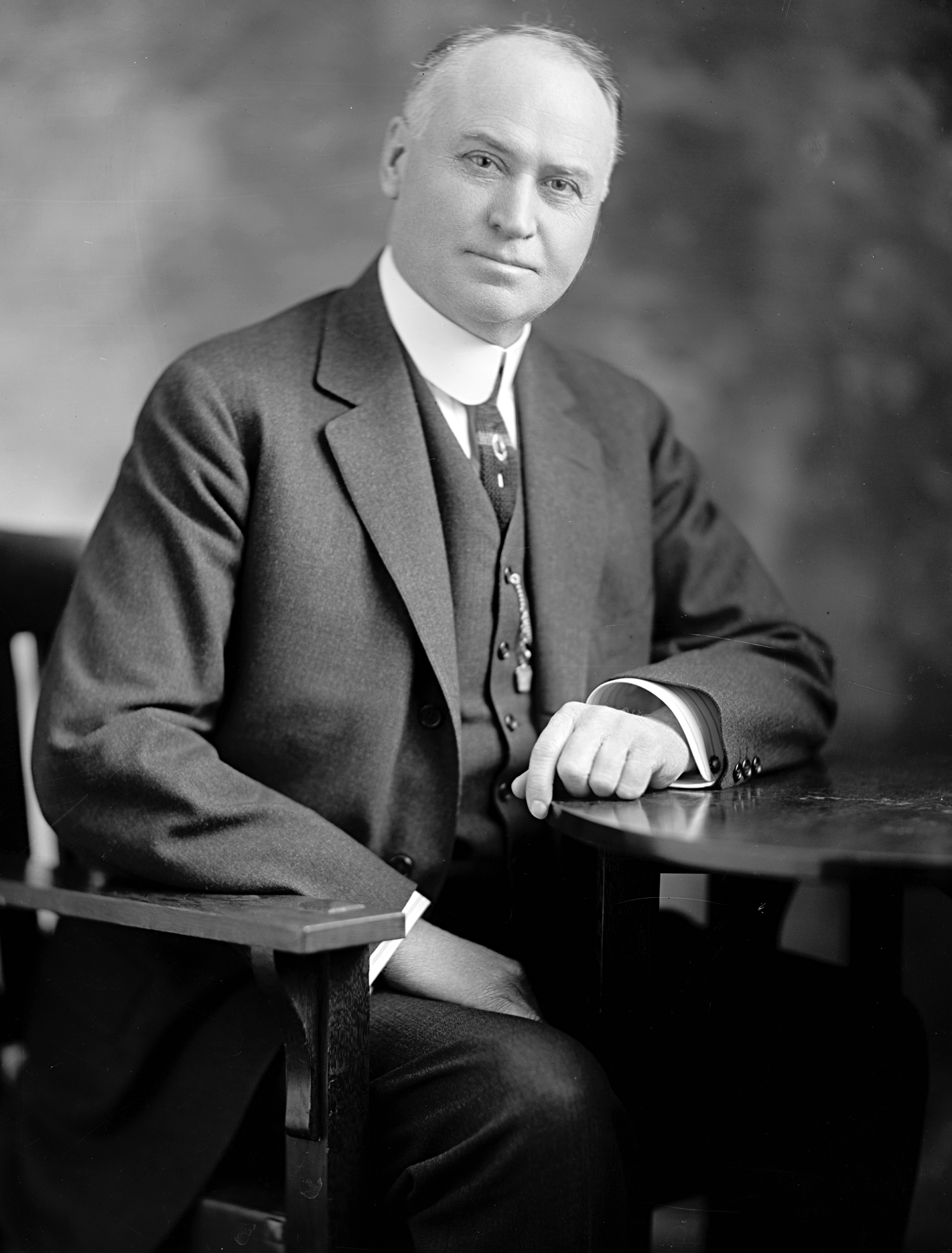

Member of the U.S. House of Representatives from Michigan
- In office March 4, 1913 – March 3, 1923
- Preceded by: District established (AL); Samuel W. Smith (6th)
- Succeeded by: District eliminated (AL); Grant M. Hudson (6th)
- Constituency: At-large district (1913-15); 6th district (1915-23)

33rd Lieutenant Governor of Michigan
- In office 1907–1911
- Governor: Fred M. Warner
- Preceded by: Alexander Maitland
- Succeeded by: John Q. Ross

Personal details
- Born: October 7, 1867 Silver Creek Township, Michigan, U.S.
- Died: September 11, 1925 (aged 57) Washington, D.C., U.S.
- Party: Republican
- Education: University of Michigan

Patrick Henry Kelley (October 7, 1867 – September 11, 1925) was a politician from the U.S. state of Michigan. He served as U.S. Representative from Michigan's 6th congressional district from 1915 to 1923.

== Biography ==
Kelley was born in Silver Creek Township, Cass County, Michigan, near Dowagiac. In 1875, he moved to Berrien County with his parents, who settled in Watervliet. He attended the district and village schools and in 1887 graduated from the Northern Indiana Normal School in Valparaiso. He taught school at Fair Plain in Berrien County for several years. He attended the Michigan State Normal School at Ypsilanti (now Eastern Michigan University) and then graduated from the law department of the University of Michigan at Ann Arbor in 1900. He was admitted to the bar the same year, commenced practice in Lansing and was a law partner with Seymour H. Person.

Kelley served as a member of the State board of education 1901–1905, as the state superintendent of public instruction 1905–1907, and as the 33rd lieutenant governor of Michigan 1907–1911 serving under Governor Fred M. Warner. In 1912, he was elected as a Republican to the Sixty-third United States Congress as an at-large candidate for an increase in Michigan's Congressional delegation as a result of the 1910 census, technically becoming the first to represent the 13th district. He was then re-elected to the four succeeding Congresses from Michigan's 6th congressional district.

In 1922, Kelley did not seek renomination, but was an unsuccessful candidate for election to the United States Senate, losing in the Republican primary to Charles E. Townsend. He resumed the practice of law in Lansing. He died while on a visit to Washington, D.C., and is interred in Mount Hope Cemetery in Lansing.

Political offices
Preceded by Alexander Maitland	Lieutenant Governor of Michigan; 1907 – 1911	Succeeded by John Q. Ross
U.S. House of Representatives
Preceded by None	United States Representative at-large (13th congressional district) of Michigan; 1913 – 1915	Succeeded by Charles Archibald Nichols
Preceded by Samuel W. Smith	United States Representative for the 6th congressional district of Michigan; 1915 – 1923	Succeeded by Grant M. Hudson
