= Warren Babcock =

American politician

Warren Babcock, Jr. (September 15, 1866 – June 3, 1913) was a Michigan politician and educator.

He was born in Ypsilanti, Michigan, son of Warren Babcock, a farmer and saloon keeper who also served as postmaster of Milan, Michigan. He married Gertrude Hanson on November 16, 1892, and they had a daughter, also named Gertrude.

He was a professor of mathematics at Michigan State Agricultural College (now Michigan State University), and lived in the small community then forming around it. In 1907, that community was incorporated as the city of East Lansing, Michigan. In 1908, he became the new city's second mayor, and served a one-year term.

As one of the few Democrats in the then-overwhelmingly Republican community, he was nominated to be East Lansing postmaster at the beginning of Woodrow Wilson's presidential administration in 1913. Similarly, his father had been appointed postmaster in Milan by the previous Democratic president, Grover Cleveland.

However, Warren, Jr., died soon after, in June 1913, and is not listed as having served as postmaster. He is buried in Mount Hope Cemetery in nearby Lansing.

His home, at 437 Abbot Road, East Lansing, Michigan, is now part of East Lansing's Oakwood Historic District.
