= John Q. Ross =

American politician

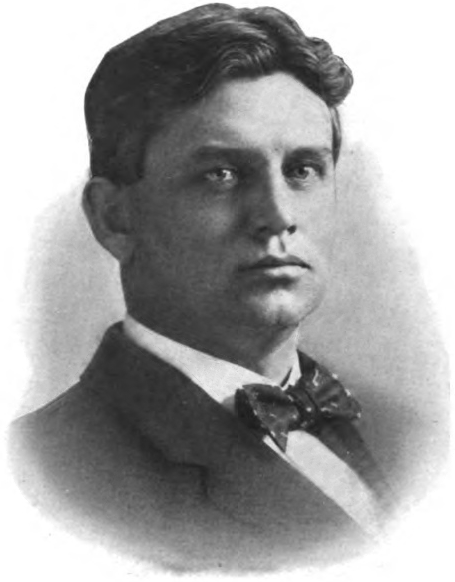

34th Lieutenant Governor of Michigan
- In office January 1, 1911 – January 1, 1915
- Governor: Chase Osborn; Woodbridge N. Ferris
- Preceded by: Patrick H. Kelley
- Succeeded by: Luren Dickinson

Personal details
- Born: June 28, 1873 Jamestown, Ohio
- Died: May 12, 1922 (aged 48) Muskegon, Michigan
- Party: Republican

John Q. Ross (June 28, 1873 – May 12, 1922) was an American politician who served as the 34th lieutenant governor of Michigan from 1911 to 1915.
