= Andrew J. Transue =

American politician (1903–1995)

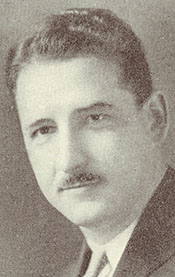

Member of the U.S. House of Representatives from Michigan's 6th district
- In office January 3, 1937 – January 3, 1939
- Preceded by: William W. Blackney
- Succeeded by: William W. Blackney

Personal details
- Born: January 12, 1903 Clarksville, Michigan
- Died: June 24, 1995 (aged 92) Flint, Michigan
- Party: Democratic

Andrew Jackson Transue (January 12, 1903 – June 24, 1995) was an American politician and attorney from the U.S. state of Michigan. He served one term in the United States House of Representatives from 1937 to 1939.

== Early life and career ==
Transue was born in Clarksville, Michigan, and attended the local schools. He graduated from the Detroit College of Law, LL.B., 1926 and J.D., 1968. He was admitted to the bar in 1926 and commenced the practice of law in Detroit in 1926 and Flint, Michigan, in 1927. He also served as prosecuting attorney of Genesee County in 1933 and 1937.

== Congress ==
In 1936, Transue defeated incumbent Republican William W. Blackney to be elected as a Democrat from Michigan's 6th congressional district to the 75th United States Congress, serving from January 3, 1937, to January 3, 1939. He was an unsuccessful candidate for reelection in 1938, losing to Blackney.

== Life after Congress ==
Transue resumed the practice of law after leaving Congress and was a resident of Flint until his death. He was the attorney for the plaintiff, and won, in the 1951–1952 U.S. Supreme Court case Morissette v. United States.

U.S. House of Representatives
| Preceded by William W. Blackney | United States Representative for the 6th congressional district of Michigan; 1937 – 1939 | Succeeded by William W. Blackney |
