= Willard I. Bowerman Jr. =

American politician (1917–1987)

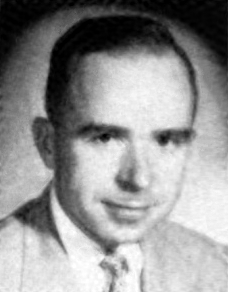

Mayor of Lansing
- In office 1961–1965
- Preceded by: Ralph Crego
- Succeeded by: Max E. Murninghan

Member of the Michigan House of Representatives from the Ingham County 1st district
- In office January 1, 1953 – December 31, 1960

Personal details
- Born: May 3, 1917 Lansing, Michigan, U.S.
- Died: September 22, 1987 (aged 70) Lansing, Michigan, U.S.
- Resting place: Mount Hope Cemetery; Lansing, Michigan, U.S.
- Party: Republican
- Spouse: Carolyn C. Hawks (m. 1947)
- Children: 5
- Education: Michigan State University; University of Michigan Law School

Willard I. Bowerman Jr. (May 3, 1917 – September 22, 1987) was a Michigan politician.

== Early life ==
Bowerman was born in Lansing, Michigan, on May 3, 1917.

== Education ==
Bowerman graduated from Lansing Central High School. Bowerman earned an AB from Michigan State University in 1939 and an LL.B. from the University of Michigan Law School in 1947.

== Career ==
Bowerman held a number of legal positions, including chief assistant prosecutor of Ingham County, assistant city attorney of Lansing, and the Ingham County and State Bar associations. Bowerman served on the Lansing city council for two terms. On November 4, 1952, Bowerman was elected to the Michigan House of Representatives as a Republican where he represented the Ingham County 1st district from January 14, 1953, to December 31, 1960. Bowerman served as mayor of Lansing from 1961 to 1965. Bowerman was not re-elected in 1965. After his mayorship, Bowerman went on to serve on the Workmen's Compensation Commission Appeal Board.

== Personal life ==
On August 25, 1947, Bowerman married Carolyn C. Hawks. Together, they had three children. Bowerman was a member of the Plymouth Congregational Church.

== Death ==
Bowerman died on September 22, 1987, in Lansing. Bowerman was interred at Mount Hope Cemetery in Lansing.
