= Claude E. Cady =

American politician (1878–1953)

Member of the U.S. House of Representatives from Michigan's 6th district
- In office March 4, 1933 – January 3, 1935
- Preceded by: Seymour H. Person
- Succeeded by: William W. Blackney

Personal details
- Born: May 28, 1878 Lansing, Michigan, U.S.
- Died: November 30, 1953 (aged 75) Lansing, Michigan, U.S.
- Resting place: Mount Hope Cemetery; Lansing, Michigan, U.S.
- Party: Democratic

Claude Ernest Cady (May 28, 1878 – November 30, 1953) was a politician and businessman from the U.S. state of Michigan.

Cady was born in Lansing, Michigan, where he attended the common schools and the high school. He engaged in the wholesale and retail grocery business from 1899 to 1913. He was active in the amusement business, being owner of three theaters in Lansing (including the Capitol and Gladmer Theaters), and also had financial interests in other Michigan cities from 1914 to 1925, He was in the wholesale candy and fountain supplies business from 1925 to 1932. Cady served as a member of the Lansing board of aldermen 1910–1917 and was a member of the Lansing Police and Fire Commission 1918–1928.

In 1932, Cady defeated Republican Seymour H. Person in the general election to be elected as a Democrat from Michigan's 6th congressional district to the U.S. House of Representatives for the 73rd Congress, serving from March 4, 1933, to January 3, 1935. He was defeated by Republican William W. Blackney in 1934.

Cady served as postmaster in Lansing 1935–1943, after which he retired from political and business life. He died in Lansing and is interred in Mount Hope Cemetery there.

U.S. House of Representatives
Preceded by Seymour H. Person	United States Representative for the 6th congressional district of Michigan; 1933–1935	Succeeded by William W. Blackney
