= Michigan's 6th congressional district =

U.S. House district for Michigan

Coordinates: 42°09′51″N 86°09′22″W

- Interactive map of district boundaries since January 3, 2023
- Representative: Debbie Dingell; D–Ann Arbor
- Population (2025): 769,431
- Median household income: $100,323
- Ethnicity: 69.1% White; 10.4% Asian; 9.9% Black; 5.0% Hispanic; 4.9% Two or more races; 0.7% other
- Cook PVI: D+12

Michigan's 6th congressional district is a United States congressional district in southeast Michigan. In 2022, the district was redrawn to be centered around Ann Arbor and Washtenaw County, as well as western and southern Wayne County, a small part of southwestern Oakland County, and the city of Milan in Monroe County. In previous redistrictings, the 6th district consisted of all of Berrien, Cass, Kalamazoo, St. Joseph, and Van Buren counties, and includes most of Allegan county.

The district is currently represented by Democrat Debbie Dingell, who previously represented the old 12th district.

== Counties and municipalities ==
For the 118th and successive Congresses (based on redistricting following the 2020 census), the district contains all or portions of the following counties, municipalities and townships:

Monroe County (1)

City of Milan (city partly located in Monroe County and partly in Washtenaw; adjacent Township of Milan, Monroe County is in Michigan's 5th congressional district)

Oakland County (3)

Northville (southern part in Wayne County), Novi (part; also 11th), Novi Township

Washtenaw County (28)

All 28 municipalities (7 cities, 1 village), townships and charter townships.

Wayne County (16)

Belleville, Brownstown Charter Township, Canton Charter Township, Flat Rock (a southwesterly portion of the city is in Monroe County and part of Michigan's 5th congressional district), Gibraltar, Grosse Ile Township, Huron Charter Township, Northville (northern part in Oakland County), Plymouth, Plymouth Charter Township, Riverview, Rockwood, Sumpter Township, Trenton, Van Buren Charter Township, Woodhaven

== Recent election results from statewide races ==
Year	Office	Results
2008	President	Obama 62% - 37%
2012	President	Obama 60% - 40%
2014	Senate	Peters 60% - 36%
2014	Governor	Snyder 49.4% - 48.9%
2014	Secretary of State	Johnson 51% - 47%
2014	Attorney General	Totten 50% - 46%
2016	President	Clinton 58% - 37%
2018	Senate	Stabenow 62% - 36%
2018	Governor	Whitmer 63% - 34%
2018	Attorney General	Nessel 60% - 36%
2020	President	Biden 63% - 36%
2020	Senate	Peters 61% - 38%
2022	Governor	Whitmer 66% - 32%
2022	Secretary of State	Benson 68% - 30%
2022	Attorney General	Nessel 65% - 33%
2024	President	Harris 60% - 37%
2024	Senate	Slotkin 60% - 36%

== History ==
Michigan's sixth congressional district was originally formed in 1862. At this time it had all the Upper Peninsula except Menominee, Delta and Mackinac counties.

The district was vaguely contiguous, in that it did not contain the Straits of Mackinac but did include Presque Isle County, which can be reached without going through another district's area. It included another 21 counties on the Lower Peninsula. The southern boundary of the district was formed by Clinton, Shiawassee, Genesee, Tuscola and Huron counties. The district had a population of 97,783.

In 1872, the sixth district was shifted southward. It retained Clinton, Shiawassee, and Genesee counties while adding Ingham, Livingston and Oakland counties. With 163,000 residents the district had 12,000 more inhabitants than the next most populous district, and 65,000 more residents than Michigan's least populous district.

In 1882, Shiawassee County was removed from the district. The new district had about 165,000 people. In 1892, Clinton County was removed but the townships of Livonia, Nankin (now Westland, Michigan and surrounding cities), Redford (including the eastern portion since annexed by Detroit), Greenfield (almost all now in Detroit, except the portion that became Highland Park, Springwells (since annexed by Detroit and Dearborn), and Dearborn in Wayne County were added, as well as the part of Detroit west of Lawton. This new district had a population of 190,539 that was 0.8% African-American.

No changes were made in the boundaries of the district in 1902. Its population had risen to 221,699.

It was not until 1932 that the boundaries of the 6th district were altered. In this year it lost its parts of Oakland and Wayne counties and was shifted to Ingham, Livingston, and Genesee Counties. These boundaries were not changed until 1964, when the district was redrawn to cover Jackson, Ingham, and Shiawassee counties.

In 1972, the district was redrawn to include Jackson, Ingham, and Livingston counties, as well as the western portion of Washtenaw County.

In 1982 the district was redrawn to Ingham, Livingston, and northwestern Oakland counties with a finger stretching all the way to Pontiac. Waterford Township was in the district, as was Auburn Hills, but Orion Township, Rochester Hills and Bloomfield Hills were all in other districts. The boundaries also included Independence Township, White Lake Township, Rose Township, Springfield Township and Highland Township. Brighton and the areas directly east of it in Livingston County were also not in this district. Most of Lansing was put in the 3rd district. In Jackson County the district covered Henrietta Township, Rives Township, and Tompkins Township. In Clinton County it included Bath Township. In Shiawassee County the district included Antrim Township, Perry Township, Perry, and Woodhull Township.

In 1992, most of the old 6th's territory became the 8th district, while the 6th was redrawn to cover most of the old 4th and a small portion of the old 3rd, ending the splitting of Kalamazoo County between two districts. There were minor changes in the districts boundaries in 2002 and 2012.

== List of members representing the district ==
Representative	Party	Term	Cong ress	Electoral history
District created March 4, 1863
John F. Driggs (East Saginaw)	Republican	March 4, 1863 – March 3, 1869	38th 39th 40th	Elected in 1862. Re-elected in 1864. Re-elected in 1866. Retired.
Randolph Strickland (St. Johns)	Republican	March 4, 1869 – March 3, 1871	41st	Elected in 1868. Lost renomination.
Jabez G. Sutherland (Saginaw)	Democratic	March 4, 1871 – March 3, 1873	42nd	Elected in 1870. Retired.
Josiah Begole (Flint)	Republican	March 4, 1873 – March 3, 1875	43rd	Elected in 1872. Lost re-election.
George H. Durand (Flint)	Democratic	March 4, 1875 – March 3, 1877	44th	Elected in 1874. Lost re-election.
Mark S. Brewer (Pontiac)	Republican	March 4, 1877 – March 3, 1881	45th 46th	Elected in 1876. Re-elected in 1878. Retired.
Oliver L. Spaulding (St. Johns)	Republican	March 4, 1881 – March 3, 1883	47th	Elected in 1880. Lost re-election.
Edwin B. Winans (Hamburg)	Democratic	March 4, 1883 – March 3, 1887	48th 49th	Elected in 1882. Re-elected in 1884. Retired.
Mark S. Brewer (Pontiac)	Republican	March 3, 1887 – March 3, 1891	50th 51st	Elected in 1886. Re-elected in 1888. Retired.
Byron G. Stout (Pontiac)	Democratic	March 3, 1891 – March 3, 1893	52nd	Elected in 1890. Lost re-election.
David D. Aitken (Flint)	Republican	March 4, 1893 – March 3, 1897	53rd 54th	Elected in 1892. Re-elected in 1894. Retired to run for Governor of Michigan.
Samuel W. Smith (Pontiac)	Republican	March 4, 1897 – March 3, 1915	55th 56th 57th 58th 59th 60th 61st 62nd 63rd	Elected in 1896. Re-elected in 1898. Re-elected in 1900. Re-elected in 1902. Re-elected in 1904..Re-elected in 1906. Re-elected in 1908. Re-elected in 1910. Re-elected in 1912. Retired.
Patrick H. Kelley (Lansing)	Republican	March 4, 1915 – March 3, 1923	64th 65th 66th 67th	Redistricted from the at-large district and re-elected in 1914. Re-elected in 1916. Re-elected in 1918. Re-elected in 1920. Retired to run for U.S. senator.
Grant M. Hudson (East Lansing)	Republican	March 4, 1923 – March 3, 1931	68th 69th 70th 71st	Elected in 1922. Re-elected in 1924. Re-elected in 1926. Re-elected in 1928. Lost renomination.
Seymour H. Person (Lansing)	Republican	March 4, 1931 – March 3, 1933	72nd	Elected in 1930. Lost re-election.
Claude E. Cady (Lansing)	Democratic	March 4, 1933 – January 3, 1935	73rd	Elected in 1932. Lost re-election.
William W. Blackney (Flint)	Republican	January 3, 1935 – January 3, 1937	74th	Elected in 1934. Lost re-election.
Andrew J. Transue (Flint)	Democratic	January 3, 1937 – January 3, 1939	75th	Elected in 1936. Lost re-election.
William W. Blackney (Flint)	Republican	January 3, 1939 – January 3, 1953	76th 77th 78th 79th 80th 81st 82nd	Elected in 1938. Re-elected in 1940. Re-elected in 1942. Re-elected in 1944. Re-elected in 1946. Re-elected in 1948. Re-elected in 1950. Retired.
Kit Clardy (East Lansing)	Republican	January 3, 1953 – January 3, 1955	83rd	Elected in 1952. Lost re-election.
Donald Hayworth (East Lansing)	Democratic	January 3, 1955 – January 3, 1957	84th	Elected in 1954. Lost re-election.
Charles E. Chamberlain (East Lansing)	Republican	January 3, 1957 – December 31, 1974	85th 86th 87th 88th 89th 90th 91st 92nd 93rd	Elected in 1956. Re-elected in 1958. Re-elected in 1960. Re-elected in 1962. Re-elected in 1964. Re-elected in 1966. Re-elected in 1968. Re-elected in 1970. Re-elected in 1972. Retired and resigned early.
Vacant		December 31, 1974 – January 3, 1975	93rd	
Bob Carr (East Lansing)	Democratic	January 3, 1975 – January 3, 1981	94th 95th 96th	Elected in 1974. Re-elected in 1976. Re-elected in 1978. Lost re-election.
Jim Dunn (East Lansing)	Republican	January 3, 1981 – January 3, 1983	97th	Elected in 1980. Lost re-election.
Bob Carr (East Lansing)	Democratic	January 3, 1983 – January 3, 1993	98th 99th 100th 101st 102nd	Elected in 1982. Re-elected in 1984. Re-elected in 1986. Re-elected in 1988. Re-elected in 1990. Redistricted to the 8th district.
Fred Upton (St. Joseph)	Republican	January 3, 1993 – January 3, 2023	103rd 104th 105th 106th 107th 108th 109th 110th 111th 112th 113th 114th 115th 116th 117th	Redistricted from the 4th district and re-elected in 1992. Re-elected in 1994. Re-elected in 1996. Re-elected in 1998. Re-elected in 2000. Re-elected in 2002. Re-elected in 2004. Re-elected in 2006. Re-elected in 2008. Re-elected in 2010. Re-elected in 2012. Re-elected in 2014. Re-elected in 2016. Re-elected in 2018. Re-elected in 2020. Redistricted to the 4th district and retired.
Debbie Dingell (Ann Arbor)	Democratic	January 3, 2023 – present	118th 119th	Redistricted from the 12th district and re-elected in 2022. Re-elected in 2024. Re-elected in 2026.

== Recent election results ==
=== 2012 ===
Michigan's 6th congressional district, 2012
Party	Candidate	Votes	%
Republican	Fred Upton (incumbent)	174,955	54.6
Democratic	Mike O'Brien	136,563	42.6
Libertarian	Christie Gelineau	6,366	2.1
Independent	Jason Gatties	2,591	0.7
Total votes		320,475	100.0
Republican hold			

=== 2014 ===
Michigan's 6th congressional district, 2014
Party	Candidate	Votes	%
Republican	Fred Upton (incumbent)	116,801	55.9
Democratic	Paul Clements	84,391	40.4
Libertarian	Erwin Haas	5,530	2.6
Green	John Lawrence	2,254	1.1
Total votes		208,976	100.0
Republican hold			

=== 2016 ===
Michigan's 6th congressional district, 2016
Party	Candidate	Votes	%
Republican	Fred Upton (incumbent)	193,259	58.6
Democratic	Paul Clements	119,980	36.5
Libertarian	Lorence Wenke	16,248	4.9
Independent	Richard Miller Overton (write-in)	78	0.0
Total votes		329,565	100.0
Republican hold			

=== 2018 ===
Michigan's 6th congressional district, 2018
Party	Candidate	Votes	%
Republican	Fred Upton (incumbent)	147,436	50.2
Democratic	Matt Longjohn	134,082	45.7
U.S. Taxpayers'	Stephen Young	11,920	4.1
Total votes		293,438	100.0
Republican hold			

=== 2020 ===
Michigan's 6th congressional district, 2020
Party	Candidate	Votes	%
Republican	Fred Upton (incumbent)	211,496	55.8
Democratic	Jon Hoadley	152,085	40.1
Libertarian	Jeff DePoy	10,399	2.7
Green	John Lawrence	4,440	1.2
Independent	Jerry Solis (write-in)	560	0.2
Total votes		378,980	100.0
Republican hold			

=== 2022 ===
Michigan's 6th congressional district, 2022
Party	Candidate	Votes	%
Democratic	Debbie Dingell (incumbent)	241,759	65.8
Republican	Whittney Williams	125,167	34.1
Write-in		1	0.0
Total votes		366,927	100.0
Democratic hold			

=== 2024 ===
Michigan's 6th congressional district, 2024
Party	Candidate	Votes	%
Democratic	Debbie Dingell (incumbent)	281,162	62.0
Republican	Heather Smiley	158,658	35.0
Green	Clyde K. Shabazz	7,963	1.8
Libertarian	Bill Krebaum	5,523	1.2
Total votes		453,306	100.0
Democratic hold			

== Historical district boundaries ==
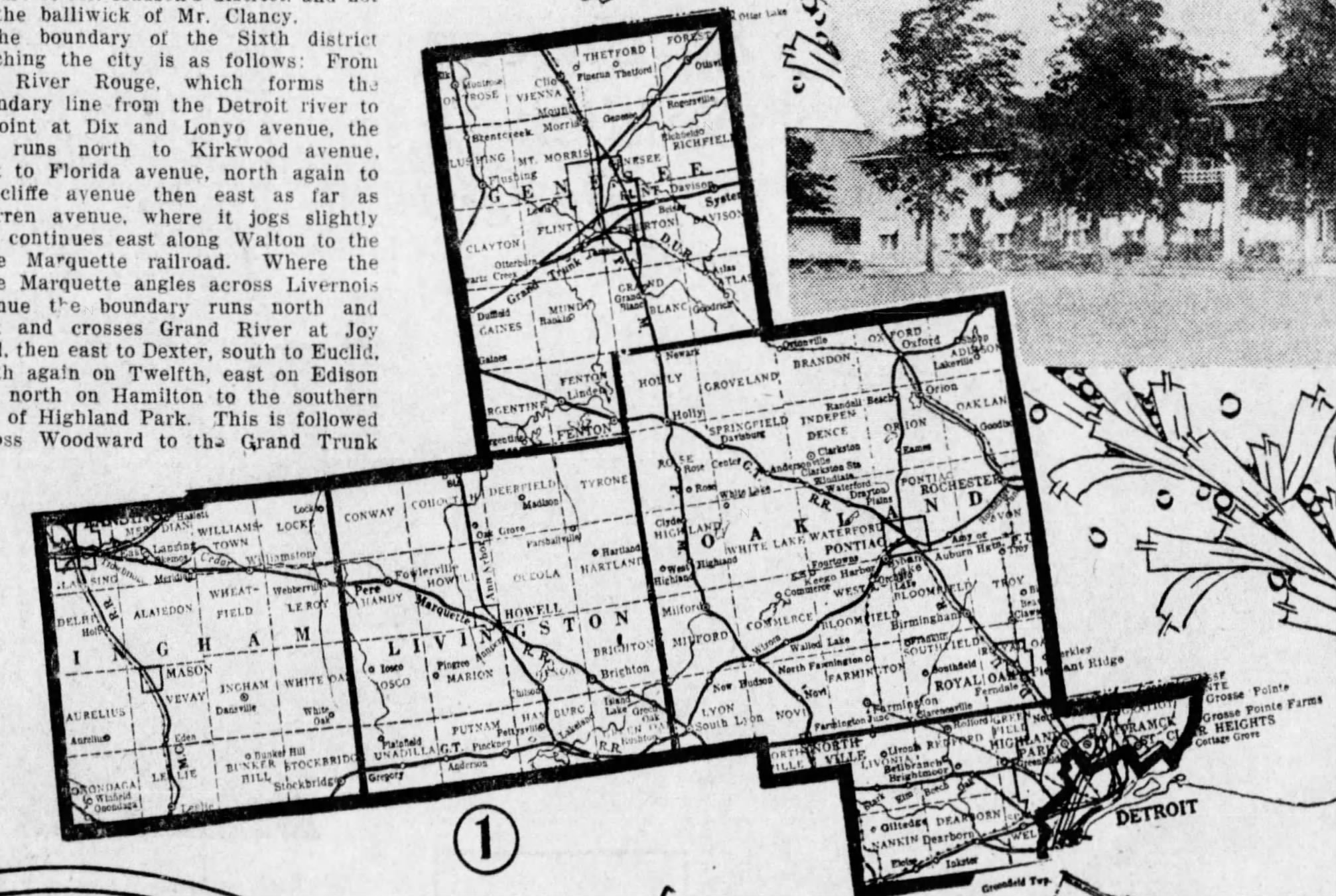
1923–1933

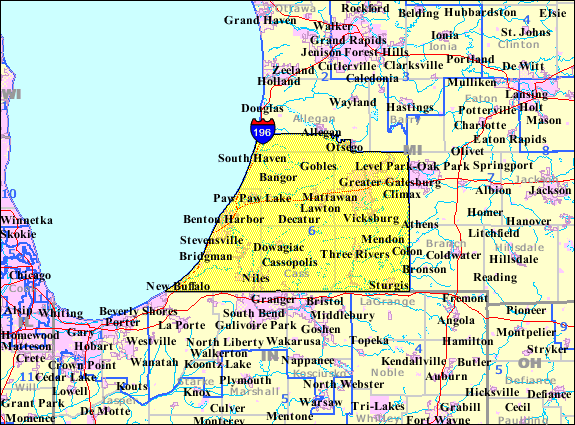
1993–2003

2003–2013

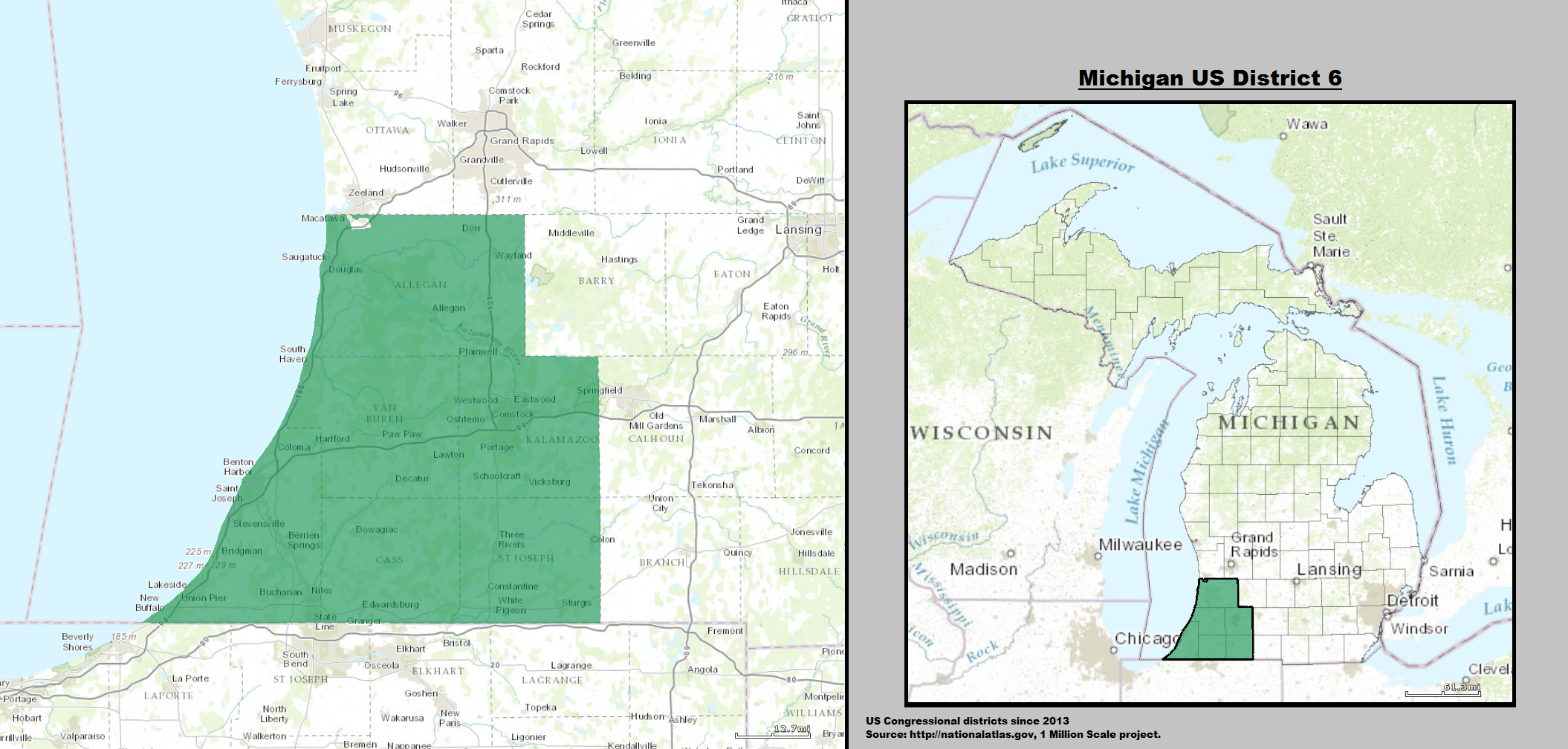
2013–2023

== See also ==
- Michigan's congressional districts
- List of United States congressional districts
