= Donald Hayworth =

American politician

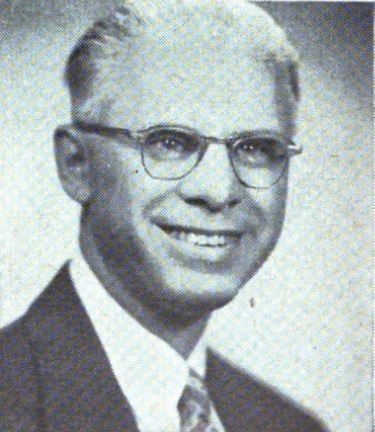

Member of the U.S. House of Representatives from Michigan's 6th district
- In office January 3, 1955 – January 3, 1957
- Preceded by: Kit Clardy
- Succeeded by: Charles E. Chamberlain

Personal details
- Born: January 13, 1898 Toledo, Iowa
- Died: February 25, 1982 (aged 84) Washington, D.C.
- Party: Democratic

Donald Hayworth (January 13, 1898 – February 25, 1982) was a politician from the U.S. state of Michigan.

Hayworth was born in Toledo, Iowa, and attended a country school in Mahaska County, Iowa, and high school in New Sharon, Iowa. He graduated from Grinnell College in 1918. During the First World War, he served as a private in the United States Army. He earned an M.A. from the University of Chicago in 1921 and a Ph.D. from the University of Wisconsin–Madison in 1929. He worked as a teacher in Oskaloosa High School in Oskaloosa, Iowa, 1921–1923 and was a professor at Penn College in Oskaloosa, 1923-1927. He then became a professor at the University of Akron in Akron, Ohio, 1928–1937, and at Michigan State College in East Lansing, Michigan, 1937-1963. He was in charge of the speakers' bureau at the Office of Civil Defense in Washington, D.C., in 1942 and 1943 and in charge of relations with the States on fuel conservation for the Department of the Interior, 1944-1946. He was the owner of the Plastics Manufacturing Co., 1950–1963

In 1952, Hayworth was an unsuccessful candidate of the Democratic Party for election to the 83rd United States Congress from Michigan's 6th congressional district, losing to Republican Kit F. Clardy. In 1954, Hayworth defeated the incumbent Clardy for election to the 84th Congress, serving from January 3, 1955 to January 3, 1957. He was an unsuccessful candidate for reelection in 1956, losing in the general election to Republican Charles E. Chamberlain. He was the Democratic Party candidate in 1958 and 1962, losing both times to Chamberlain.

Hayworth became a consultant, with the Department of Agriculture, 1963–1964, and with the Social Security Administration, 1965-1967. He was a member of Americans for Democratic Action and was a resident of Washington, D.C., until his death there. Hayworth's body was donated to the George Washington University School of Medicine & Health Sciences.

== Sources ==
- United States Congress. "Donald Hayworth (id: H000412)". Biographical Directory of the United States Congress.
- Donald Hayworth at The Political Graveyard

U.S. House of Representatives
Preceded by Kit F. Clardy	United States Representative for the 6th congressional district of Michigan; 1955 – 1957	Succeeded by Charles E. Chamberlain
