= L. Anna Ballard =

American medical physician

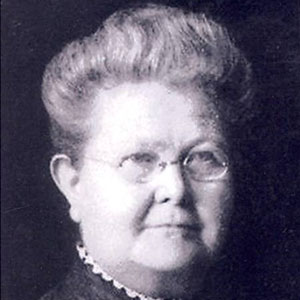
L. Anna Ballard

L. Anna Ballard (July 21, 1848 – 1934) was an American physician. After graduating from medical school, Ballard became Lansing, Michigan's first female medical physician. She also worked to change the age of consent from 10 to 14 years in Michigan. In 2012, she was inducted into the Michigan Women's Hall of Fame.

== Early life and education ==
Ballard was born in Michigan on July 21, 1848. Ballard grew up with nine other siblings, James, Sindenia, David, Henry, Eunice, Alonzo, Benjamin, Sarah, and Alice. After attended the Michigan Female College, she taught at Lansing Central High School for two years. In 1871, she became a clerk at a drug store in DeWitt, before applying to the medical department at the University of Michigan in 1873. After graduation, Ballard moved to Chicago where she worked under the supervision of Dr. Mary H. Thompson at the Chicago Hospital for Women and Children and studied at the Woman's Hospital Medical College of Chicago.

== Career ==
Upon earning her medical degree in 1878, Ballard returned home to open her own medical practice. In doing so, she became the first female medical physician in Lansing, Michigan. She was also a founding member of the Lansing Medical Society in 1882, and the Ingham County Medical Society. In 1887, she worked to change the age of consent from 10 to 14 years in Michigan. She represented the state department of social purity and advocated that the age of consent should be raised as high as 18 years old.

== Death ==
Ballard was buried at Mount Hope Cemetery in Lansing.

== Legacy ==
She was posthumously inducted into the Michigan Women's Hall of Fame in 2012.
