= William W. Blackney =

American politician (1876–1963)

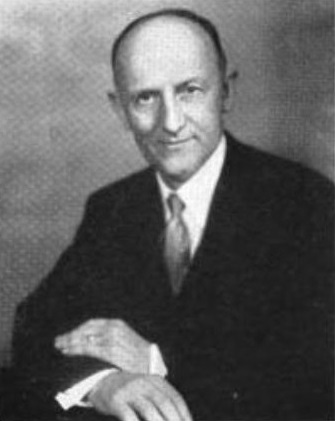

Member of the U.S. House of Representatives from Michigan's 6th district
- In office January 3, 1939 – January 3, 1953
- Preceded by: Andrew J. Transue
- Succeeded by: Kit Clardy
- In office January 3, 1935 – January 3, 1937
- Preceded by: Claude E. Cady
- Succeeded by: Andrew J. Transue

Personal details
- Born: August 28, 1876 Clio, Michigan
- Died: March 14, 1963 (aged 86) Flint, Michigan
- Party: Republican

William Wallace Blackney (August 28, 1876 – March 14, 1963) was a politician from the U.S. state of Michigan. He served eight terms in the United States House of Representatives.

== Early life and education ==
Blackney was born in Clio, Michigan, and attended the public schools there. He went to Olivet College, Olivet, Michigan, and Ferris School (now Ferris State University) in Big Rapids. He moved to Flint, in 1904 and served as county clerk of Genesee County 1905–1912. He was graduated from the law department of the University of Michigan in 1912, was admitted to the bar the same year, and commenced practice in Flint.

He served as assistant prosecuting attorney of Genesee County 1913–1917, member of the Flint School Board 1924–1934, member of the Republican State central committee 1925–1930, and instructor in the General Motors Company technical night school for sixteen years. He was a delegate to the 1932 Republican National Convention.

== Congress ==
In 1934, Blackney defeated incumbent Claude E. Cady to be elected as a Republican from Michigan's 6th congressional district to the U.S. House for the 74th Congress, serving from January 3, 1935, to January 3, 1937. He lost to Democrat Andrew J. Transue in 1936, but defeated him to be re-elected in 1938 to the 76th Congress. He was subsequently re-elected to the six succeeding Congresses, serving from January 3, 1939, to January 3, 1953.

A report created for President Harry S. Truman in September 1948 claimed that Blackney had a "reactionary record in Congress".

He was not a candidate for re-election in 1952 and retired to Flint, where he resided until his death, aged 86. He is interred in Woodlawn Cemetery in his birthplace of Clio, Michigan.

U.S. House of Representatives
| Preceded by Claude E. Cady | United States Representative for the 6th congressional district of Michigan; 1935 – 1937 | Succeeded by Andrew J. Transue |
| Preceded by Andrew J. Transue | United States Representative for the 6th congressional district of Michigan; 1939 – 1953 | Succeeded by Kit F. Clardy |
