= George E. Ranney =

American Civil War Medal of Honor recipient

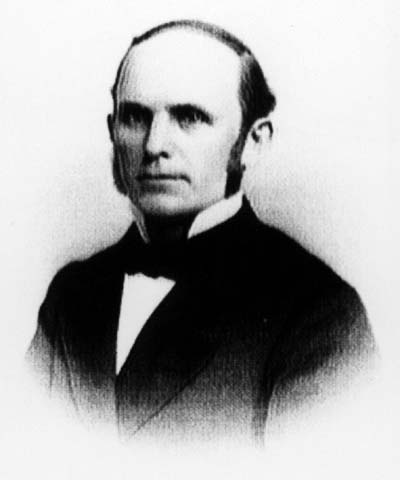
- Ranney c. 1875
- Born: June 13, 1839; Batavia, New York, U.S.
- Died: November 10, 1915 (aged 76)
- Burial place: Mount Hope Cemetery; Lansing, Michigan
- Military career
- Allegiance: United States
- Branch: United States Army; Union Army
- Rank: Assistant Surgeon
- Unit: 2nd Michigan Volunteer Cavalry Regiment
- Conflicts: Battle of Resaca
- Awards: Medal of Honor

George E. Ranney (June 13, 1839 – November 10, 1915) was an American assistant surgeon who received the Medal of Honor for valor for his service with the Union Army during the American Civil War.

== Biography ==
Ranney served in the American Civil War in the 2nd Michigan Volunteer Cavalry Regiment. He received the Medal of Honor on April 24, 1901, for his actions at the Battle of Resaca on May 14, 1864.

After the war, he became a companion of the Michigan Commandery of the Military Order of the Loyal Legion of the United States.

Ranney later gifted land to the city of Lansing, Michigan, in what would become Ranney Park that today features a skatepark, baseball diamond and a coming wetland park that is under construction as of Fall 2020.

== Medal of Honor citation ==
Citation:

At great personal risk, went to the aid of a wounded soldier, Pvt. Charles W. Baker, lying under heavy fire between the lines, and with the aid of an orderly carried him to a place of safety.

== Death ==
Ranney's grave at Mount Hope Cemetery

Ranney is buried at Mount Hope Cemetery in Lansing.

== See also ==
- List of American Civil War Medal of Honor recipients: Q-S
