= Charles E. Chamberlain =

American politician (1917–2002)

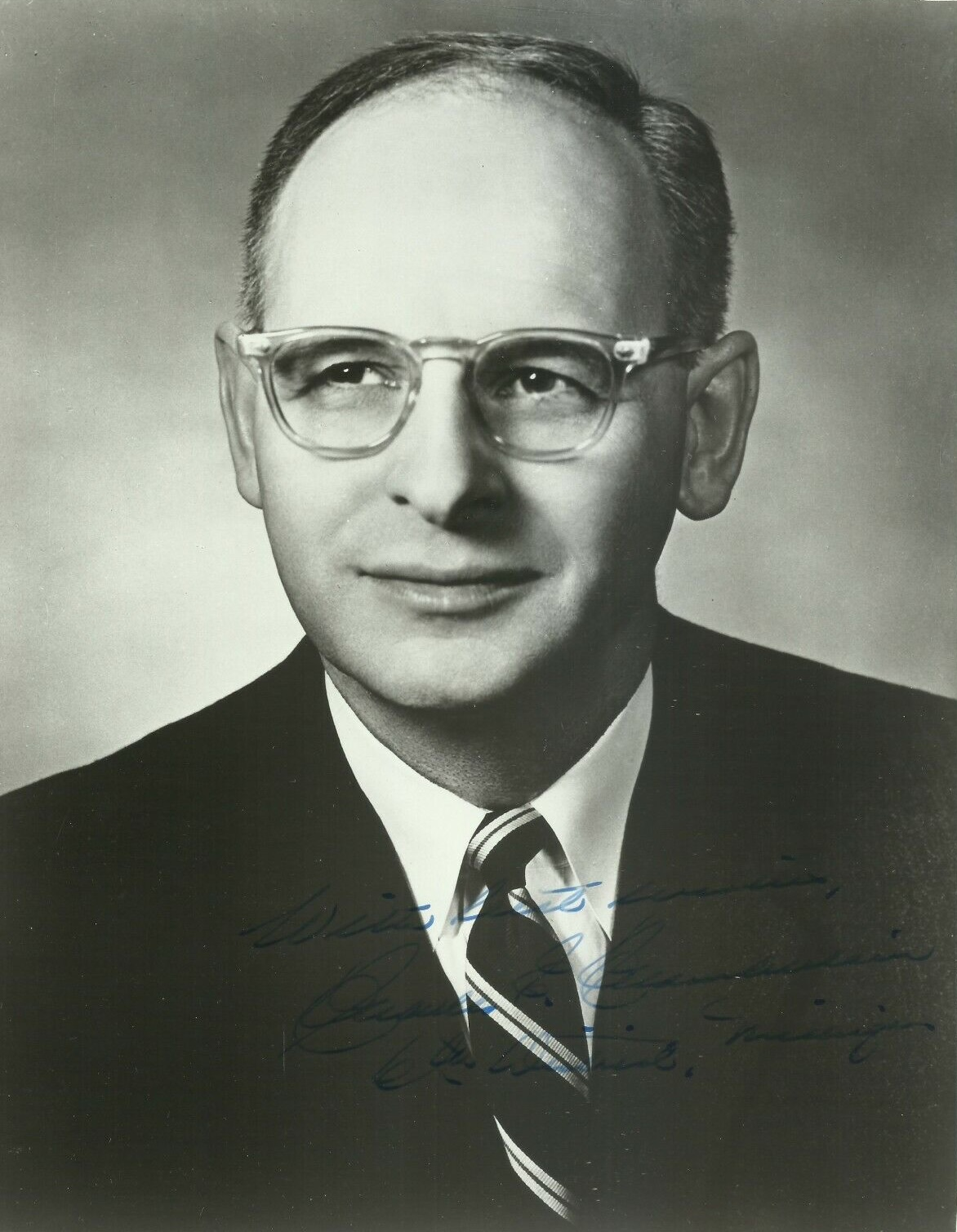

Member of the U.S. House of Representatives from Michigan's 6th district
- In office January 3, 1957 – December 31, 1974
- Preceded by: Donald Hayworth
- Succeeded by: Milton Robert Carr

Personal details
- Born: July 22, 1917 Locke Township, Michigan
- Died: November 25, 2002 (aged 85) Leesburg, Virginia
- Party: Republican

Charles Ernest Chamberlain (July 22, 1917 – November 25, 2002) was an American politician who was the U.S. representative from Michigan's 6th congressional district from 1957 to 1974.

== Life and career ==
Chamberlain was born in Locke Township, Michigan and after graduating from Lansing Central High School in Lansing, went on to earn a Bachelor of Science degree in 1941 from the University of Virginia in Charlottesville. He earned an Bachelor of Laws degree from the University of Virginia School of Law in 1949.

During World War II, Chamberlain served in the United States Coast Guard, 1942–1946, and afterward in the United States Coast Guard Reserve, 1946–1977. He worked as a lawyer in private practice and as an Internal Revenue Service agent in the United States Treasury Department, 1946–1947. He was assistant prosecutor for Ingham County, Michigan in 1950 and city attorney of East Lansing and legal counsel to the Michigan State Senate judiciary committee in 1953 and 1954. He was prosecuting attorney for Ingham County, 1955–1956.

In 1956, Chamberlain defeated the Democratic incumbent Donald Hayworth to be elected as a Republican from Michigan's 6th congressional district to the Eighty-fifth Congress. He was re-elected to the eight succeeding Congresses, serving from January 3, 1957, until December 31, 1974. He only narrowly defeated Democrat Milton Robert Carr by 97,666 votes (50.68%) to 95,029 (49.32%) in what was otherwise a strong Republican year in 1972. In 1974 he was succeeded by Carr. Chamberlain voted in favor of the Civil Rights Acts of 1957, 1960, 1964, and 1968, as well as the 24th Amendment to the U.S. Constitution and the Voting Rights Act of 1965.

Chamberlain died in Leesburg, Virginia of renal failure and congestive heart failure. He is interred in Evergreen Cemetery, Lansing, Michigan. He had been a member of the American Legion, the Society of the Cincinnati, Sons of the American Revolution, Veterans of Foreign Wars, and Kiwanis.

U.S. House of Representatives
Preceded by Donald Hayworth	United States Representative for the 6th congressional district of Michigan; 1957 – 1974	Succeeded by Bob Carr
