= 2000 United States House of Representatives elections in Michigan =

- November 7, 2000

All 16 Michigan seats to the United States House of Representatives
	Majority party	Minority party
Party	Democratic	Republican
Last election	10	6
Seats won	9	7
Seat change	▼1	▲1
Popular vote	2,177,618	1,786,980
Percentage	53.51%	43.91%
Swing	▲4.30%	▼4.27%

Democratic
50–60%
60–70%
70–80%
80–90%
Republican
40–50%
50–60%
60–70%
70–80%

The 2000 congressional elections in Michigan was held on November 7, 2000, to determine who would represent the state of Michigan in the United States House of Representatives. Michigan had sixteen seats in the House, apportioned according to the 1990 United States census. Representatives are elected for two-year terms.

The state primary elections were held on August 8.

The general election in Michigan's 8th congressional district was the closest House race in 2000.

== Overview ==
United States House of Representatives elections in Michigan, 2000
Party	Votes	Percentage	Seats before	Seats after	+/–
Democratic	2,177,618	53.51%	10	9	-1
Republican	1,786,980	43.91%	6	7	+1
Libertarian	48,100	1.18%	0	0	-
U.S. Taxpayers	18,272	0.45%	0	0	-
Natural Law	16,344	0.40%	0	0	-
Green	15,602	0.38%	0	0	-
Reform	6,709	0.16%	0	0	-
Write-ins	35	0.00%	0	0	-
Total	4,069,660	100.00%	16	16	-

== District 1 ==
2000 Michigan's 1st congressional district election
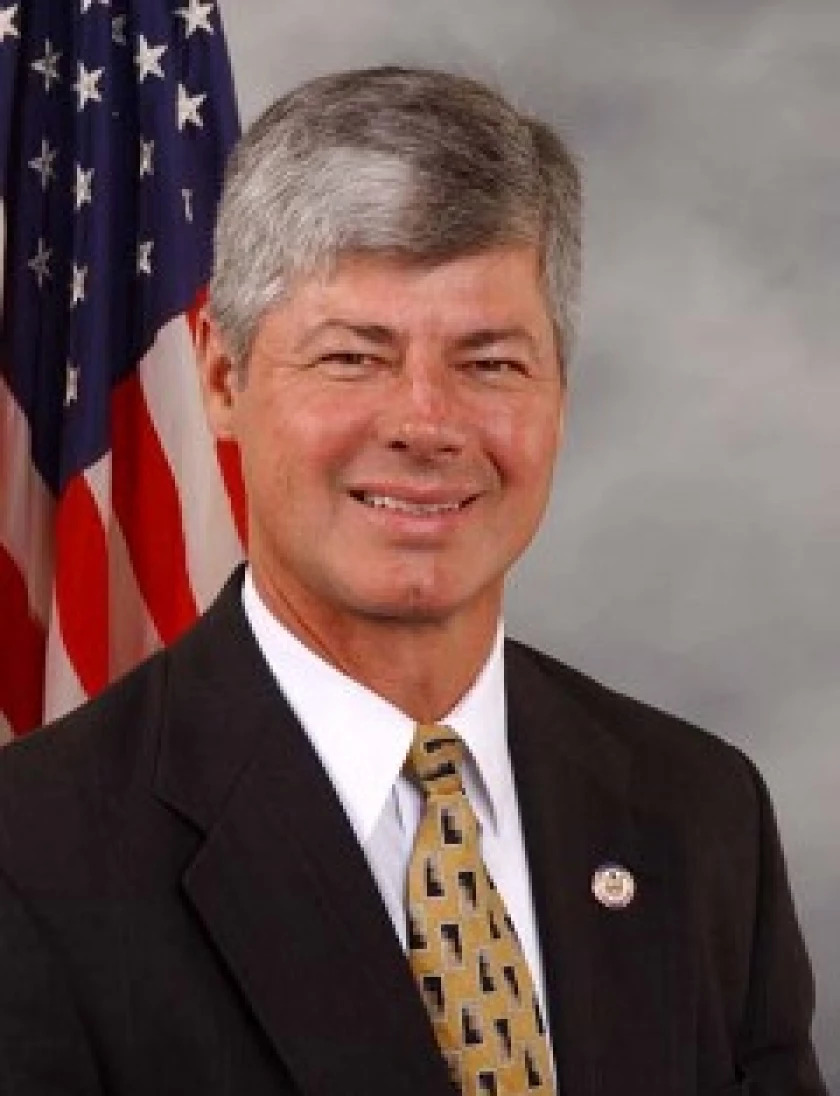

Nominee	Bart Stupak	Chuck Yob
Party	Democratic	Republican
Popular vote	169649	117300
Percentage	58.4%	40.4%
- County results Stupak: 40–50% 50–60% 60–70% Yob: 50–60%
U.S. Representative before election
Bart Stupak
Democratic
Elected U.S. Representative
Bart Stupak
Democratic

Incumbent Democrat Bart Stupak was re-elected.

=== Primaries ===
Democratic primary election
Party	Candidate	Votes	%
Democratic	Bart Stupak (incumbent)	40,601	88.93%
Democratic	Sven Johnson	5,051	11.06%
Total votes		45,652	100.0

Republican primary election
Party	Candidate	Votes	%
Republican	Chuck Yob	40,191	100.0%
Total votes		40,191	100.0

=== General election ===
2000 Michigan's 1st congressional district election
Party	Candidate	Votes	%
Democratic	Bart Stupak (incumbent)	169,649	58.38%
Republican	Chuck Yob	117,300	40.36%
Natural Law	Wendy Conway	1,839	0.63%
Libertarian	John W. Loosemore	1,757	0.60%
Write-In	Sven Johnson	24	0.00%
Total votes		290,569	100.0
Democratic hold			

== District 2 ==
2000 Michigan's 2nd congressional district election

Nominee	Peter Hoekstra	Bob Shrauger
Party	Republican	Democratic
Popular vote	186762	96370
Percentage	64.4%	33.2%
- County results Hoekstra: 40–50% 50–60% 60–70% 70–80% Shrauger: 50–60%
U.S. Representative before election
Peter Hoekstra
Republican
Elected U.S. Representative
Peter Hoekstra
Republican

Incumbent Republican Peter Hoekstra was re-elected.

=== Primaries ===
Republican primary election
Party	Candidate	Votes	%
Republican	Peter Hoekstra (incumbent)	57,170	100.0%
Total votes		57,170	100.0

Democratic primary election
Party	Candidate	Votes	%
Democratic	Bob Shrauger	12,786	100.0%
Total votes		12,786	100.0

=== General election ===
2000 Michigan's 2nd congressional district election
Party	Candidate	Votes	%
Republican	Peter Hoekstra (incumbent)	186,762	64.41%
Democratic	Bob Shrauger	96,370	33.23%
Natural Law	Susan J. Goldberg	2,705	0.93%
Libertarian	Bruce A. Smith	2,639	0.91%
U.S. Taxpayers	Ronald E. Graeser	1,449	0.49%
Total votes		289,925	100.0
Republican hold			

== District 3 ==
2000 Michigan's 3rd congressional district election
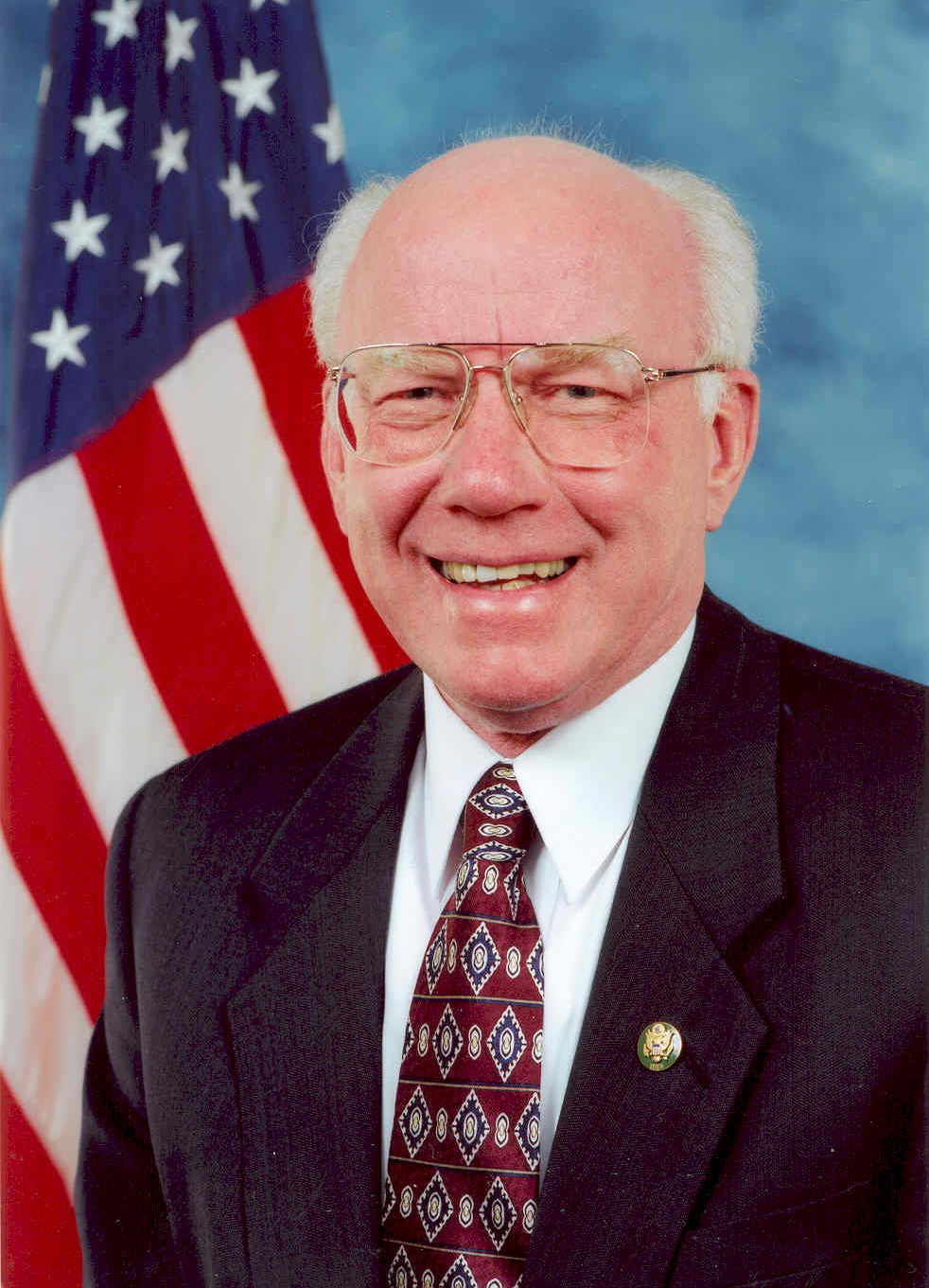

Nominee	Vernon Ehlers	Timothy W. Steele
Party	Republican	Democratic
Popular vote	179539	91309
Percentage	65.0%	33.0%
- County results Ehlers: 60–70%
U.S. Representative before election
Vernon Ehlers
Republican
Elected U.S. Representative
Vernon Ehlers
Republican

Incumbent Republican Vernon Ehlers was re-elected.

=== Primaries ===
Republican primary election
Party	Candidate	Votes	%
Republican	Vernon Ehlers (incumbent)	59,202	100.0%
Total votes		59,202	100.0

Democratic primary election
Party	Candidate	Votes	%
Democratic	Timothy W. Steele	10,743	73.48%
Democratic	Gregory Frushour	3,877	26.51%
Total votes		14,620	100.0

=== General election ===
2000 Michigan's 3rd congressional district election
Party	Candidate	Votes	%
Republican	Vernon Ehlers (incumbent)	179,539	64.98%
Democratic	Timothy W. Steele	91,309	33.05%
Libertarian	Erwin J. Haas	2,403	0.86%
U.S. Taxpayers	Tom Grego	1,093	0.39%
Reform	Kenneth L. Lowndes	1,053	0.38%
Natural Law	Jerry Berta	866	0.31%
Total votes		276,263	100.0
Republican hold			

== District 4 ==
2000 Michigan's 4th congressional district election
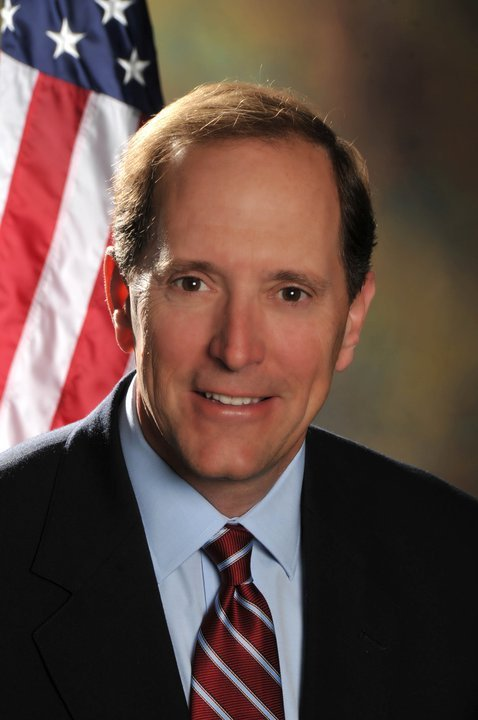

Nominee	Dave Camp	Lawrence D. Hollenbeck
Party	Republican	Democratic
Popular vote	182128	78019
Percentage	68.0%	29.1%
- County results Camp: 60–70% 70–80%
U.S. Representative before election
Dave Camp
Republican
Elected U.S. Representative
Dave Camp
Republican

Incumbent Republican Dave Camp was re-elected.

=== Primaries ===
Republican primary election
Party	Candidate	Votes	%
Republican	Dave Camp (incumbent)	51,264	100.0%
Total votes		51,264	100.0

Democratic primary election
Party	Candidate	Votes	%
Democratic	Lawrence D. Hollenbeck	15,785	100.0%
Total votes		15,785	100.0

=== General election ===
2000 Michigan's 4th congressional district election
Party	Candidate	Votes	%
Republican	Dave Camp (incumbent)	182,128	68.00%
Democratic	Lawrence D. Hollenbeck	78,019	29.13%
Green	Alan Gamble	3,790	1.41%
Libertarian	Richard Whitelock	2,112	0.78%
U.S. Taxpayers	John Emerick	978	0.36%
Natural Law	Stuart J. Goldberg	792	0.29%
Total votes		267,819	100.0
Republican hold			

== District 5 ==
2000 Michigan's 5th congressional district election
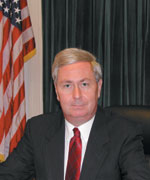

Nominee	James Barcia	Ronald G. Actis
Party	Democratic	Republican
Popular vote	184048	59274
Percentage	74.3%	23.9%
- County results Barcia: 50–60% 60–70% 70–80% 80–90%
U.S. Representative before election
James Barcia
Democratic
Elected U.S. Representative
James Barcia
Democratic

Incumbent Democrat James Barcia was re-elected.

=== Primaries ===
Democratic primary election
Party	Candidate	Votes	%
Democratic	James Barcia (incumbent)	43,120	100.0%
Total votes		43,120	100.0

Republican primary election
Party	Candidate	Votes	%
Republican	Ronald G. Actis	26,562	100.0%
Total votes		26,562	100.0

=== General election ===
2000 Michigan's 5th congressional district election
Party	Candidate	Votes	%
Democratic	James Barcia (incumbent)	184,048	74.29%
Republican	Ronald G. Actis	59,274	23.92%
Libertarian	Clint Foster	3,070	1.23%
Natural Law	Brian D. Ellison	1,345	0.54%
Total votes		247,737	100.0
Democratic hold			

== District 6 ==
2000 Michigan's 6th congressional district election
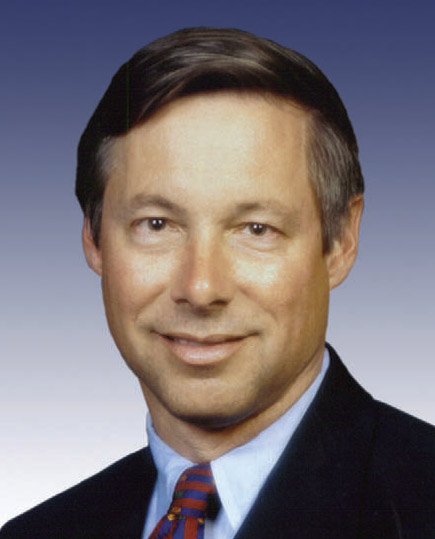

Nominee	Fred Upton	James Bupp
Party	Republican	Democratic
Popular vote	159373	68532
Percentage	67.9%	29.2%
- County results Upton: 60–70% 70–80%
U.S. Representative before election
Fred Upton
Republican
Elected U.S. Representative
Fred Upton
Republican

Incumbent Republican Fred Upton was re-elected.

=== Primaries ===
Republican primary election
Party	Candidate	Votes	%
Republican	Fred Upton (incumbent)	45,192	100.0%
Total votes		45,192	100.0

Democratic primary election
Party	Candidate	Votes	%
Democratic	James Bupp	6,386	100.0%
Total votes		6,386	100.0

=== General election ===
2000 Michigan's 6th congressional district election
Party	Candidate	Votes	%
Republican	Fred Upton (incumbent)	159,373	67.92%
Democratic	James Bupp	68,532	29.20%
Libertarian	William Bradley	3,573	1.52%
Reform	Richard M. Overton	1,872	0.79%
U.S. Taxpayers	C. Dennis James	1,290	0.54%
Total votes		234,640	100.0
Republican hold			

== District 7 ==
2000 Michigan's 7th congressional district election
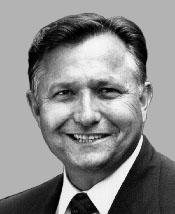

Nominee	Nick Smith	Jennie Crittendon
Party	Republican	Democratic
Popular vote	147369	86080
Percentage	61.1%	35.7%
- County results Smith: 50–60% 60–70% 70–80%
U.S. Representative before election
Nick Smith
Republican
Elected U.S. Representative
Nick Smith
Republican

Incumbent Republican Nick Smith was re-elected.

=== Primaries ===
Republican primary election
Party	Candidate	Votes	%
Republican	Nick Smith (incumbent)	37,729	100.0%
Total votes		37,729	100.0

Democratic primary election
Party	Candidate	Votes	%
Democratic	Jennie Crittendon	8,406	100.0%
Total votes		8,406	100.0

=== General election ===
2000 Michigan's 7th congressional district election
Party	Candidate	Votes	%
Republican	Nick Smith (incumbent)	147,369	61.14%
Democratic	Jennie Crittendon	86,080	35.71%
Reform	Perry Spencer	2,359	0.97%
Libertarian	Robert Broda Jr.	2,158	0.89%
U.S. Taxpayers	Steve Cousino	1,878	0.77%
Natural Law	Gail Anne Petrosoff	1,159	0.48%
Write-In	Richard Wunsch	7	0.00%
Total votes		241,010	100.0
Republican hold			

== District 8 ==
2000 Michigan's 8th congressional district election
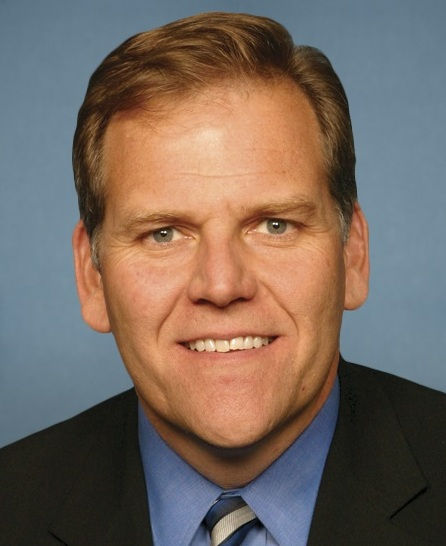

Nominee	Mike Rogers	Dianne Byrum
Party	Republican	Democratic
Popular vote	145179	145019
Percentage	48.8%	48.7%
- County results Rogers: 40–50% 50–60% 60–70% Byrum: 50–60%
U.S. Representative before election
Debbie Stabenow
Democratic
Elected U.S. Representative
Mike Rogers
Republican

Incumbent Democrat Debbie Stabenow did not run for re-election, instead running for the U.S. Senate. The race between Republican nominee Mike Rogers and Democratic nominee Dianne Byrum was the closest congressional race in the 2000 election.

=== Democratic primary ===
Democratic primary election
Party	Candidate	Votes	%
Democratic	Dianne Byrum	24,195	100.0%
Total votes		24,195	100.0

=== Republican primary ===
Republican primary election
Party	Candidate	Votes	%
Republican	Mike Rogers	30,441	100.0%
Total votes		30,441	100.0

=== General election ===
==== Polling ====
Poll source	Date(s)	Sample size	Margin of error	Mike Rogers (R)	Dianne Byrum (D)	Other / undecided (Note: Calculated by taking the difference of 100% and all other candidates combined.)
EPIC-MRA	October 24, 2000	400	—	44%	45%	11%

==== Results ====
2000 Michigan's 8th congressional district election
Party	Candidate	Votes	%
Republican	Mike Rogers	145,179	48.79%
Democratic	Dianne Byrum	145,019	48.74%
Green	Bonnie Bucqueroux	3,484	1.17%
Libertarian	James Parry Eyster	2,443	0.82%
Natural Law	Patricia Rayfield Allen	713	0.23%
U.S. Taxpayers	Francisco R. Gualdoni	695	0.23%
Total votes		297,533	100.0
Republican gain from Democratic			

== District 9 ==
2000 Michigan's 9th congressional district election
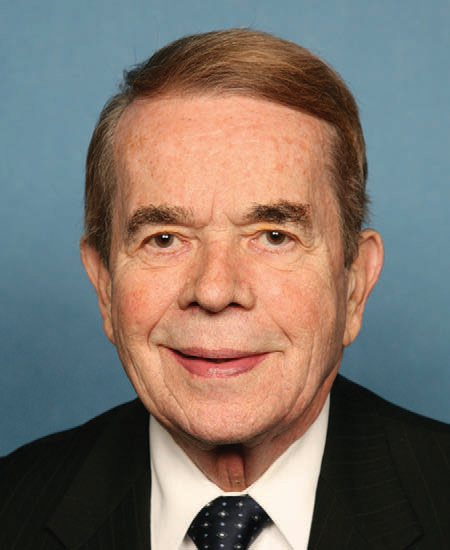

Nominee	Dale Kildee	Grant Garrett
Party	Democratic	Republican
Popular vote	158184	92926
Percentage	61.1%	35.9%
- County results Kildee: 50–60% 70–80%
U.S. Representative before election
Dale Kildee
Democratic
Elected U.S. Representative
Dale Kildee
Democratic

Incumbent Democrat Dale Kildee was re-elected.

=== Primaries ===
Democratic primary election
Party	Candidate	Votes	%
Democratic	Dale Kildee (incumbent)	27,034	100.0%
Total votes		27,034	100.0

Republican primary election
Party	Candidate	Votes	%
Republican	Grant Garrett	11,541	43.05%
Republican	John Geisler	10,965	40.90%
Republican	Carlo Iovannitti	4,297	16.03%
Total votes		26,803	100.0

=== General election ===
2000 Michigan's 9th congressional district election
Party	Candidate	Votes	%
Democratic	Dale Kildee (incumbent)	158,184	61.09%
Republican	Grant Garrett	92,926	35.88%
Libertarian	Laurie M. Martin	5,337	2.06%
U.S. Taxpayers	Terry R. Haines	1,657	0.63%
Natural Law	Alaya Bouché	824	0.31%
Total votes		258,928	100.0
Democratic hold			

== District 10 ==
2000 Michigan's 10th congressional district election
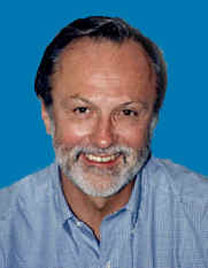

Nominee	David Bonior	Tom Turner
Party	Democratic	Republican
Popular vote	181818	93713
Percentage	64.4%	33.2%
- County results Bonior: 60–70%
U.S. Representative before election
David Bonior
Democratic
Elected U.S. Representative
David Bonior
Democratic

Incumbent Democrat David Bonior was re-elected.

=== Primaries ===
Democratic primary election
Party	Candidate	Votes	%
Democratic	David Bonior (incumbent)	31,835	89.22%
Democratic	Mario Fundaro	2,137	5.98%
Democratic	Anthony America	1,708	4.78%
Total votes		35,680	100.0

Republican primary election
Party	Candidate	Votes	%
Republican	Tom Turner	24,259	100.0%
Total votes		24,259	100.0

=== General election ===
2000 Michigan's 10th congressional district election
Party	Candidate	Votes	%
Democratic	David Bonior (incumbent)	181,818	64.41%
Republican	Tom Turner	93,713	33.19%
Libertarian	R. Friend	4,412	1.56%
U.S. Taxpayers	Joseph M. Pilchak	2,322	0.82%
Write-In	Anthony America	4	0.00%
Total votes		282,269	100.0
Democratic hold			

== District 11 ==
2000 Michigan's 11th congressional district election
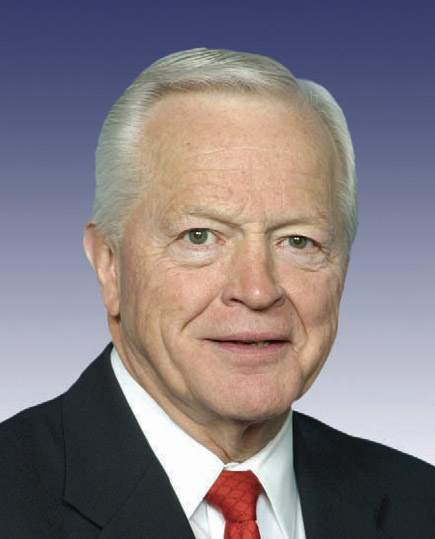

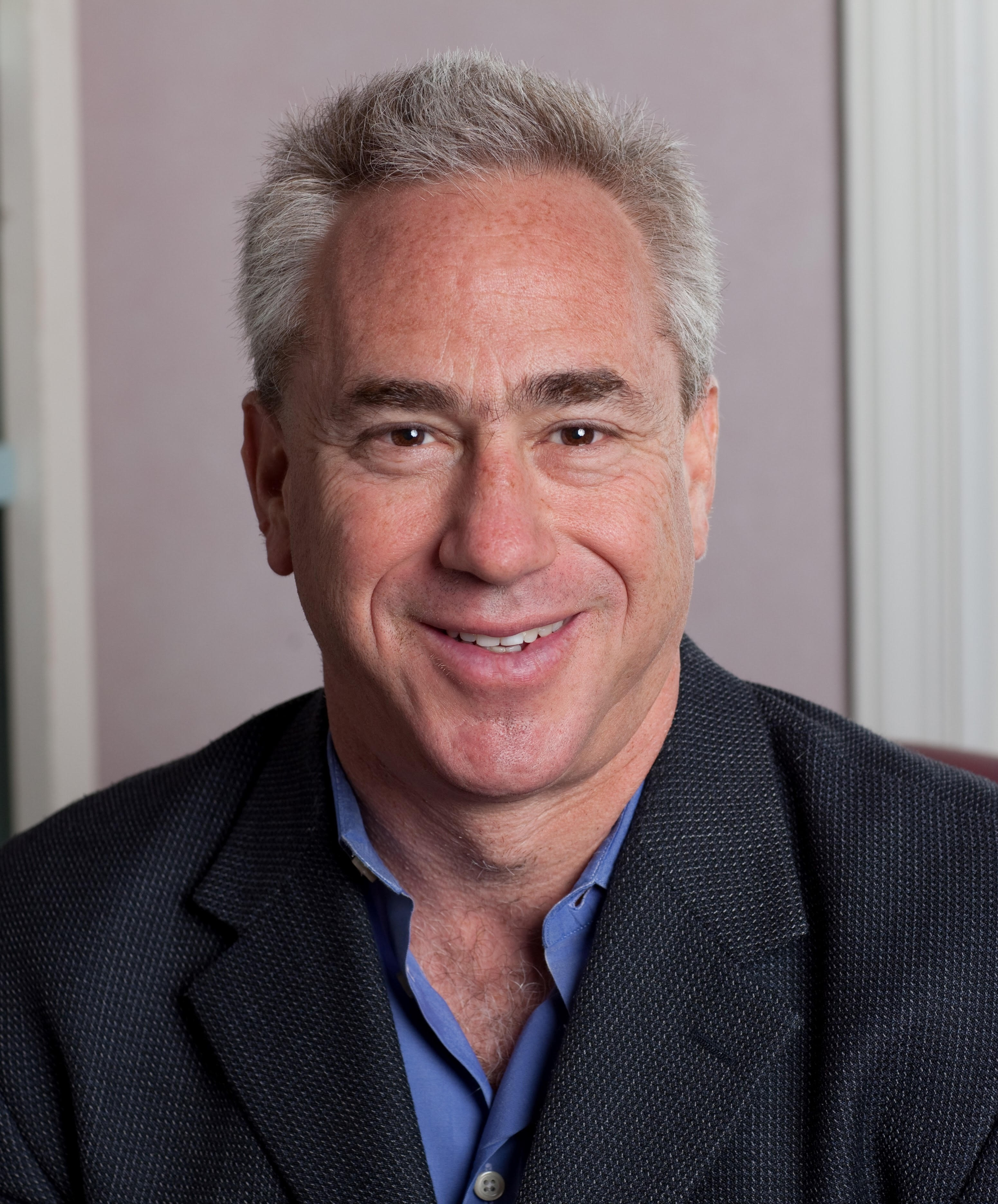
Nominee	Joe Knollenberg	Matthew Frumin
Party	Republican	Democratic
Popular vote	170790	124053
Percentage	55.8%	40.5%
- County results Knollenberg: 50–60%
U.S. Representative before election
Joe Knollenberg
Republican
Elected U.S. Representative
Joe Knollenberg
Republican

Incumbent Republican Joe Knollenberg was re-elected.

=== Primaries ===
Republican primary election
Party	Candidate	Votes	%
Republican	Joe Knollenberg (incumbent)	39,798	100.0%
Total votes		39,798	100.0

Democratic primary election
Party	Candidate	Votes	%
Democratic	Matthew Frumin	21,121	100.0%
Total votes		21,121	100.0

=== General election ===
2000 Michigan's 11th congressional district election
Party	Candidate	Votes	%
Republican	Joe Knollenberg (incumbent)	170,790	55.75%
Democratic	Matthew Frumin	124,053	40.50%
Green	Marilyn MacDermaid	4,191	1.36%
Libertarian	Dick Gach	3,371	1.10%
Reform	Joseph Andrew Ditzhazy Jr.	1,425	0.46%
U.S. Taxpayers	Daniel E. Malone	1,244	0.40%
Natural Law	Bonnie Hixson	1,228	0.40%
Total votes		306,302	100.0
Republican hold			

== District 12 ==
2000 Michigan's 12th congressional district election
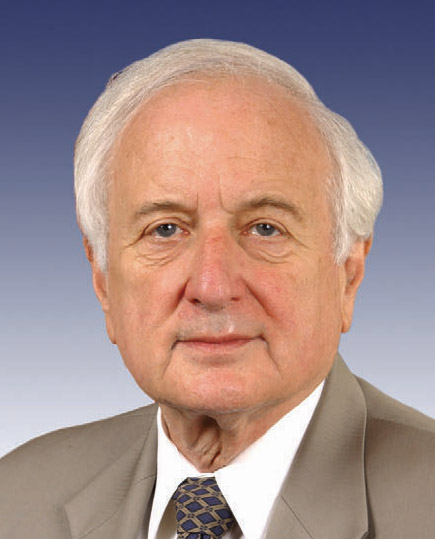

Nominee	Sander Levin	Bart Baron
Party	Democratic	Republican
Popular vote	157720	78795
Percentage	64.3%	32.1%
- County results Levin: 60–70%
U.S. Representative before election
Sander Levin
Democratic
Elected U.S. Representative
Sander Levin
Democratic

Incumbent Democrat Sander Levin was re-elected.

=== Primaries ===
Democratic primary election
Party	Candidate	Votes	%
Democratic	Sander Levin (incumbent)	25,549	100.0%
Total votes		25,549	100.0

Republican primary election
Party	Candidate	Votes	%
Republican	Bart Baron	18,154	100.0%
Total votes		18,154	100.0

=== General election ===
2000 Michigan's 12th congressional district election
Party	Candidate	Votes	%
Democratic	Sander Levin (incumbent)	157,720	64.33%
Republican	Bart Baron	78,795	32.13%
Green	Thomas Ness	4,137	1.68%
Libertarian	Andrew Le Cureaux	3,630	1.48%
Natural Law	Fred D. Rosenberg	887	0.36%
Total votes		245,169	100.0
Democratic hold			

== District 13 ==
2000 Michigan's 13th congressional district election
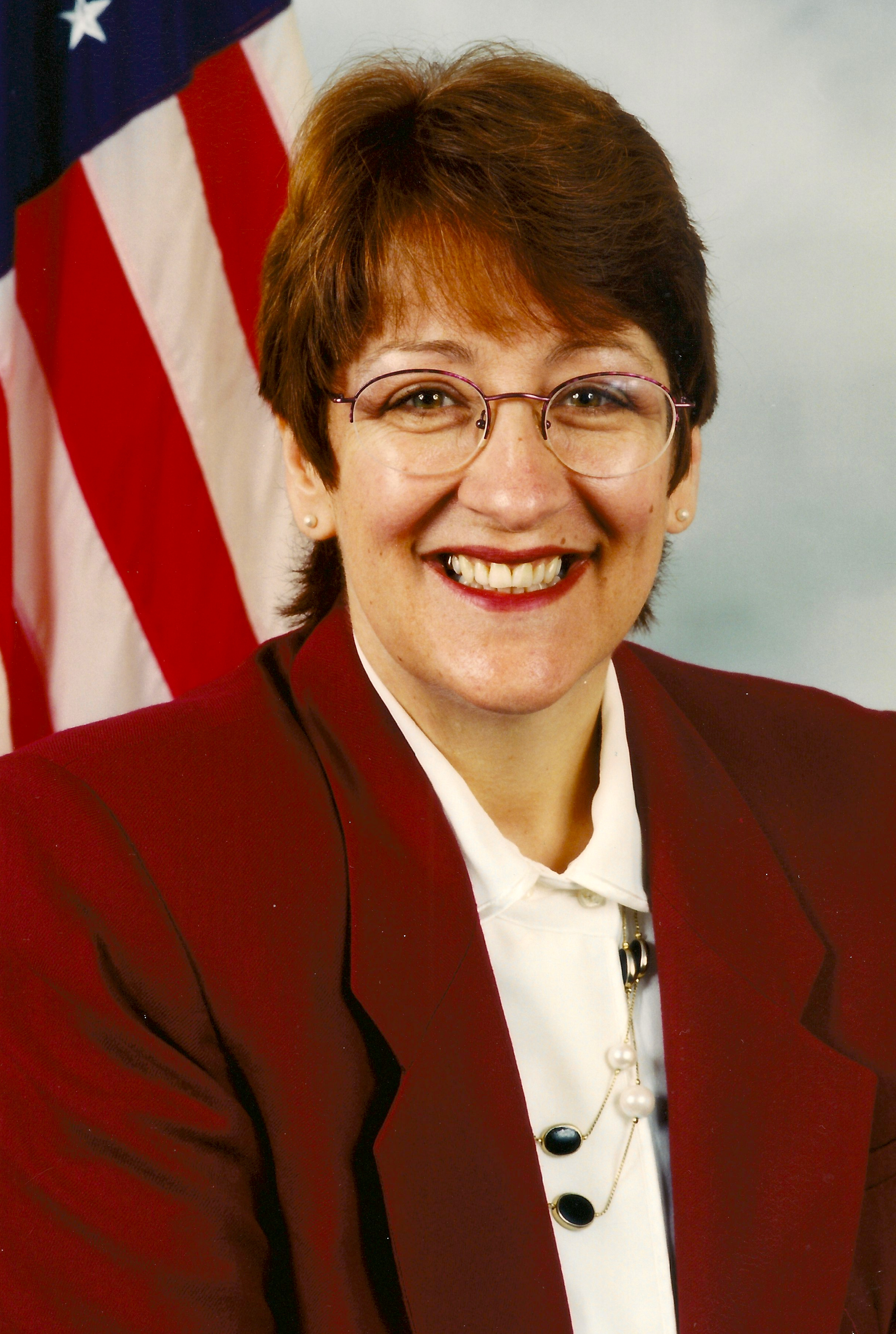

Nominee	Lynn Rivers	Carl F. Berry
Party	Democratic	Republican
Popular vote	160084	79445
Percentage	64.7%	32.1%
- County results Rivers: 50–60% 70–80%
U.S. Representative before election
Lynn Rivers
Democratic
Elected U.S. Representative
Lynn Rivers
Democratic

Incumbent Democrat Lynn Rivers was re-elected.

=== Primaries ===
Democratic primary election
Party	Candidate	Votes	%
Democratic	Lynn Rivers (incumbent)	24,469	100.0%
Total votes		24,469	100.0

Republican primary election
Party	Candidate	Votes	%
Republican	Carl F. Berry	13,363	100.0%
Total votes		13,363	100.0

=== General election ===
2000 Michigan's 13th congressional district election
Party	Candidate	Votes	%
Democratic	Lynn Rivers (incumbent)	160,084	64.67%
Republican	Carl F. Berry	79,445	32.09%
Libertarian	Karin R. Corliss	4,578	1.84%
U.S. Taxpayers	Harold H. Dunn	2,110	0.85%
Natural Law	David Arndt	1,304	0.52%
Total votes		247,521	100.0
Democratic hold			

== District 14 ==
2000 Michigan's 14th congressional district election

Nominee	John Conyers	William A. Ashe
Party	Democratic	Republican
Popular vote	168982	17582
Percentage	89.1%	9.3%
- County results John Conyers: 80–90%
U.S. Representative before election
John Conyers
Democratic
Elected U.S. Representative
John Conyers
Democratic

Incumbent Democrat John Conyers was re-elected.

=== Primaries ===
Democratic primary election
Party	Candidate	Votes	%
Democratic	John Conyers (incumbent)	48,014	100.0%
Total votes		48,014	100.0

Republican primary election
Party	Candidate	Votes	%
Republican	William A. Ashe	3,538	100.0%
Total votes		3,538	100.0

=== General election ===
2000 Michigan's 14th congressional district election
Party	Candidate	Votes	%
Democratic	John Conyers (incumbent)	168,982	89.07%
Republican	William A. Ashe	17,582	9.26%
Libertarian	Constance J. Catalfio	2,113	1.11%
Natural Law	Richard R. Miller	1,030	0.54%
Total votes		189,707	100.0
Democratic hold			

== District 15 ==
2000 Michigan's 15th congressional district election
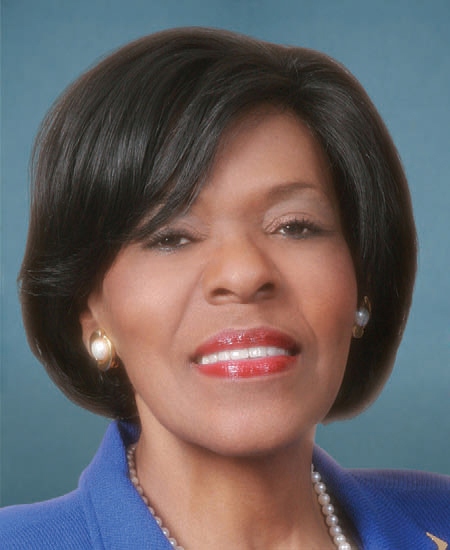

Nominee	Carolyn C. Kilpatrick	Chrysanthea D. Boyd-Fields
Party	Democratic	Republican
Popular vote	140609	14336
Percentage	88.6%	9.0%
- County results Kilpatrick: 80–90%
U.S. Representative before election
Carolyn C. Kilpatrick
Democratic
Elected U.S. Representative
Carolyn C. Kilpatrick
Democratic

Incumbent Democrat Carolyn C. Kilpatrick was re-elected.

=== Primaries ===
Democratic primary election
Party	Candidate	Votes	%
Democratic	Carolyn C. Kilpatrick (incumbent)	40,993	100.0%
Total votes		40,993	100.0

Republican primary election
Party	Candidate	Votes	%
Republican	Chrysanthea D. Boyd-Fields	2,336	100.0%
Total votes		2,336	100.0

=== General election ===
2000 Michigan's 15th congressional district election
Party	Candidate	Votes	%
Democratic	Carolyn C. Kilpatrick (incumbent)	140,609	88.57%
Republican	Chrysanthea D. Boyd-Fields	14,336	9.03%
Libertarian	Raymond H. Warner	1,690	1.06%
U.S. Taxpayers	Robert L. Thomas	1,402	0.88%
Natural Law	Gregory Frank Smith	714	0.44%
Total votes		158,751	100.0
Democratic hold			

== District 16 ==
2000 Michigan's 16th congressional district election
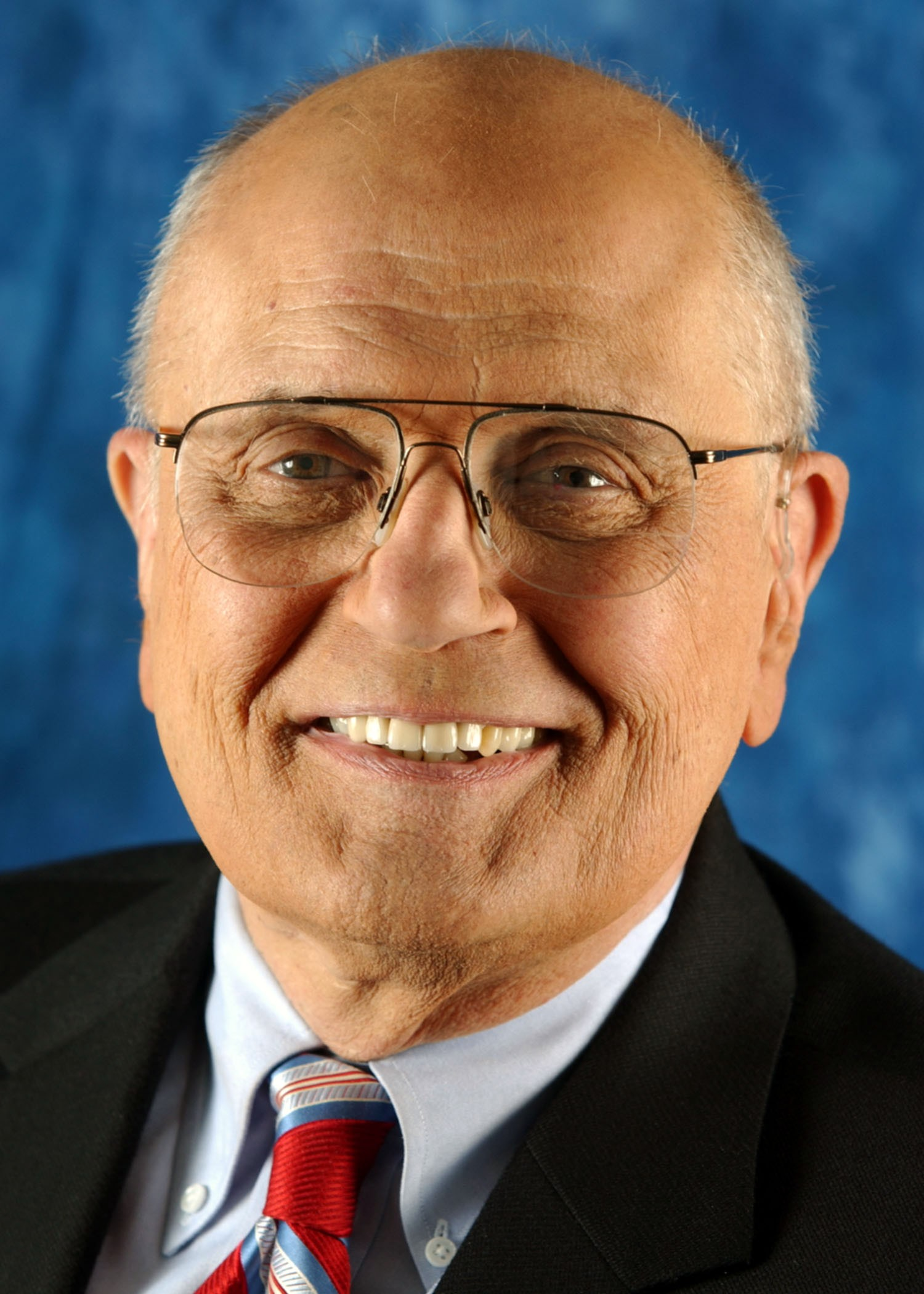

Nominee	John Dingell	William Morse
Party	Democratic	Republican
Popular vote	167142	62469
Percentage	71.0%	26.5%
- County results Dingell: 60–70% 70–80%
U.S. Representative before election
John Dingell
Democratic
Elected U.S. Representative
John Dingell
Democratic

Incumbent Democrat John Dingell was re-elected.

=== Primaries ===
Democratic primary election
Party	Candidate	Votes	%
Democratic	John Dingell (incumbent)	35,574	100.0%
Total votes		35,574	100.0

Republican primary election
Party	Candidate	Votes	%
Republican	William Morse	11,908	100.0%
Total votes		11,908	100.0

=== General election ===
2000 Michigan's 16th congressional district election
Party	Candidate	Votes	%
Democratic	John Dingell (incumbent)	167,142	70.96%
Republican	William Morse	62,469	26.52%
Libertarian	Edward Andrew Hlavac	2,814	1.19%
U.S. Taxpayers	Ken Larkin	2,154	0.91%
Natural Law	N. Fouad Hamze	938	0.39%
Total votes		235,517	100.0
Democratic hold			
