= 2002 United States House of Representatives elections in Michigan =

- November 5, 2002

All 15 Michigan seats to the United States House of Representatives
	Majority party	Minority party
Party	Republican	Democratic
Last election	7	9
Seats won	9	6
Seat change	▲2	▼3
Popular vote	1,474,178	1,507,174
Percentage	48.24%	49.32%
Swing	▲4.33%	▼4.19%

Republican
50–60%
60–70%
70–80%
80–90%
Democratic
50–60%
60–70%
70–80%
80–90%
90–100%

The 2002 congressional elections in Michigan were held on November 5, 2002, to determine who would represent the state of Michigan in the United States House of Representatives. Michigan had fifteen seats in the House, apportioned according to the 2000 United States census, causing it to lose a seat from the previous election when it had sixteen seats. Representatives are elected for two-year terms.

Michigan was one of six states in which the party that won the state's popular vote did not win a majority of seats in 2002, the other states being Connecticut, Illinois, New Mexico, Texas, and Tennessee.

== Overview ==
United States House of Representatives elections in Michigan, 2002
Party	Votes	Percentage	Seats before	Seats after	+/–
Democratic	1,507,174	49.32%	9	6	-3
Republican	1,474,178	48.24%	7	9	+2
Libertarian	51,983	1.70%	0	0	-
Green	12,939	0.42%	0	0	-
U.S. Taxpayers	5,613	0.18%	0	0	-
Reform	3,912	0.12%	0	0	-
Write-in	98	0.00%	0	0	-
Total	3,055,897	100.00%	16	15	-1

== District 1 ==
2002 Michigan's 1st congressional district election
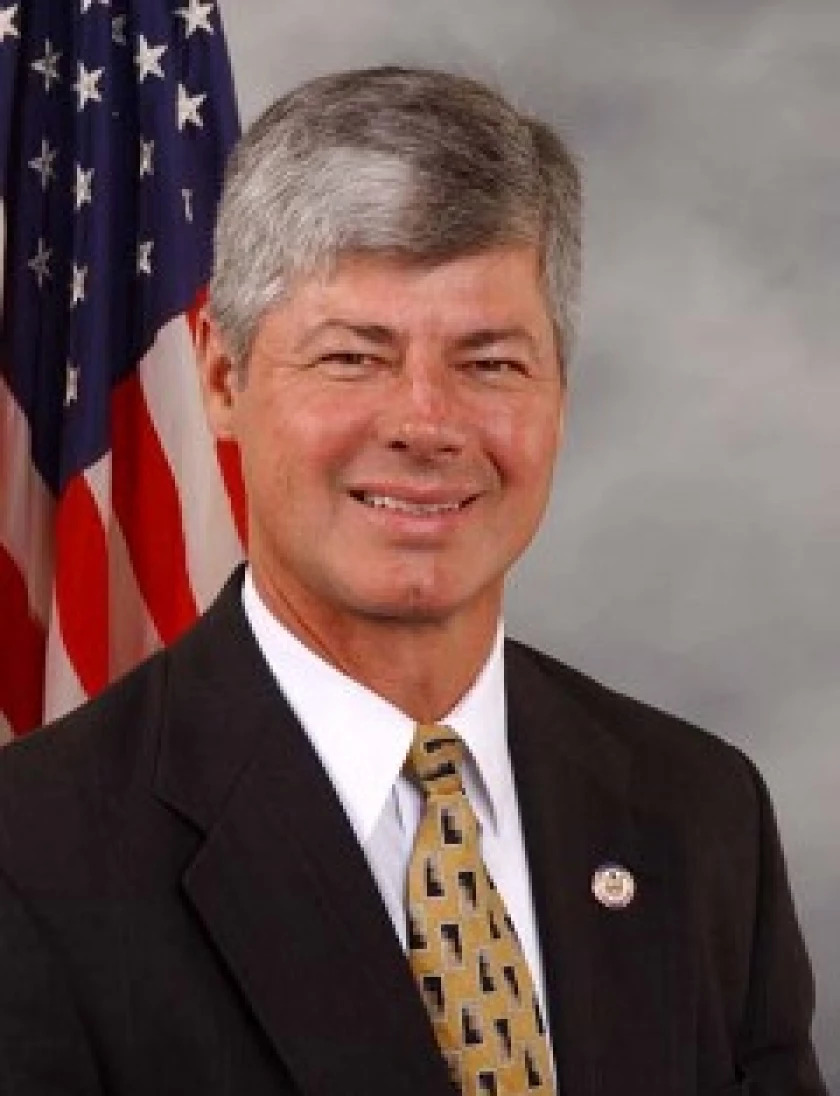

Nominee	Bart Stupak	Don Hooper
Party	Democratic	Republican
Popular vote	150,701	69,254
Percentage	67.7%	31.1%
- County results Stupak: 50–60% 60–70% 70–80%
U.S. Representative before election
Bart Stupak
Democratic
Elected U.S. Representative
Bart Stupak
Democratic

=== Predictions ===
Source	Ranking	As of
Sabato's Crystal Ball	Safe D	November 4, 2002
New York Times	Safe D	October 14, 2002

=== Results ===
2002 Michigan's 1st congressional district election
Party	Candidate	Votes	%
Democratic	Bart Stupak (incumbent)	150,701	67.67
Republican	Don Hooper	69,254	31.10
Libertarian	John Loosemore	2,732	1.23
Total votes		222,687	100.0
Democratic hold			

== District 2 ==
2002 Michigan's 2nd congressional district election

Nominee	Pete Hoekstra	Jeffrey Wrisley
Party	Republican	Democratic
Popular vote	156,937	61,749
Percentage	70.4%	27.7%
- County results Hoekstra: 50–60% 60–70% 70–80% 80–90%
U.S. Representative before election
Pete Hoekstra
Republican
Elected U.S. Representative
Pete Hoekstra
Republican

=== Predictions ===
Source	Ranking	As of
Sabato's Crystal Ball	Safe R	November 4, 2002
New York Times	Safe R	October 14, 2002

=== Results ===
2002 Michigan's 2nd congressional district election
Party	Candidate	Votes	%
Republican	Pete Hoekstra (incumbent)	156,937	70.40
Democratic	Jeffrey Wrisley	61,749	27.70
Libertarian	Laurie Aleck	2,680	1.20
U.S. Taxpayers	Ronald Graeser	1,541	0.69
Total votes		222,907	100.0
Republican hold			

== District 3 ==
2002 Michigan's 3rd congressional district election
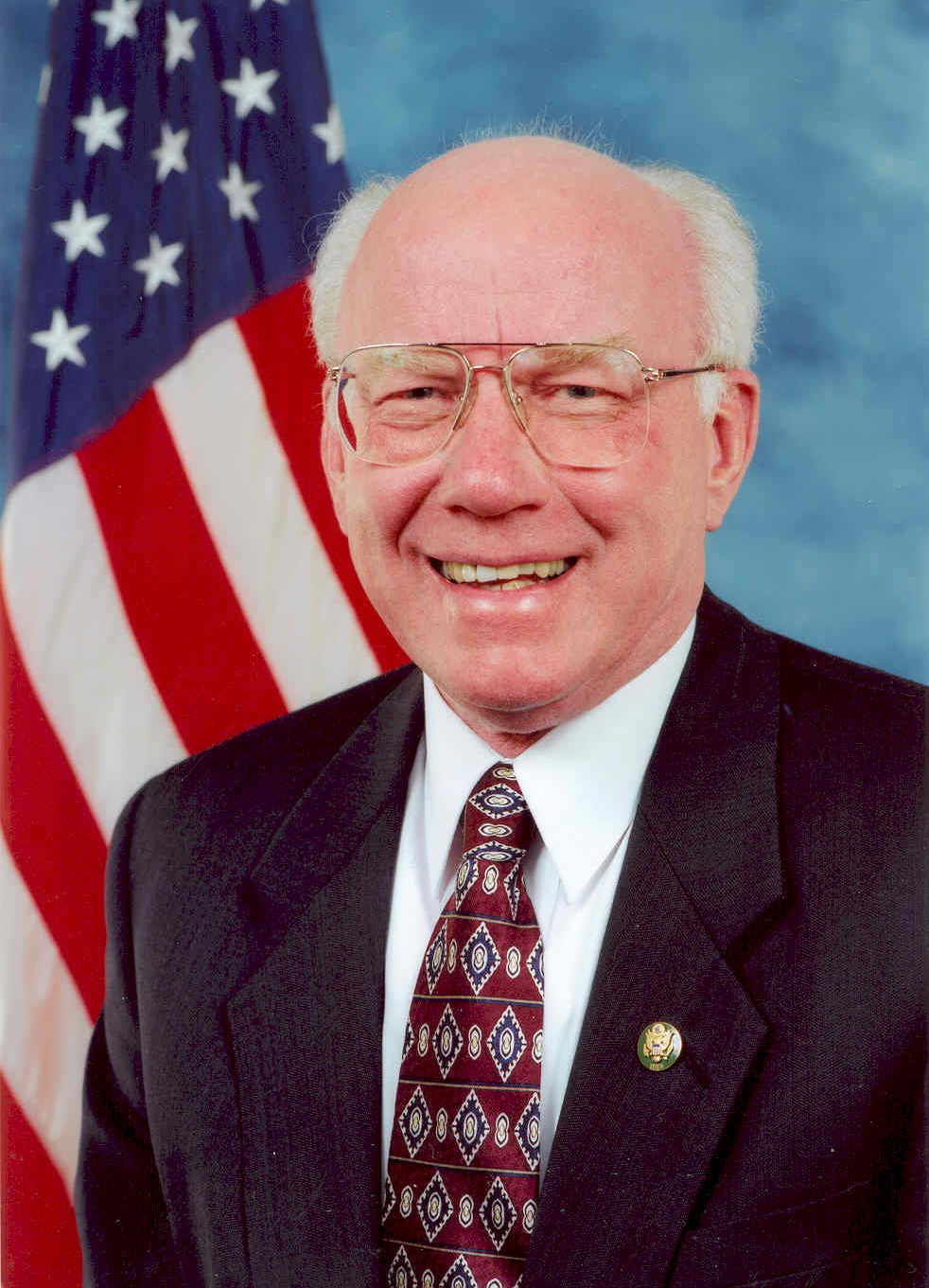

Nominee	Vern Ehlers	Kathryn Lynnes
Party	Republican	Democratic
Popular vote	153,131	61,987
Percentage	70.0%	28.3%
- County results Ehlers: 60–70% 70–80%
U.S. Representative before election
Vern Ehlers
Republican
Elected U.S. Representative
Vern Ehlers
Republican

=== Predictions ===
Source	Ranking	As of
Sabato's Crystal Ball	Safe R	November 4, 2002
New York Times	Safe R	October 14, 2002

=== Results ===
2002 Michigan's 3rd congressional district election
Party	Candidate	Votes	%
Republican	Vern Ehlers (incumbent)	153,131	69.97
Democratic	Kathryn Lynnes	61,987	28.32
Libertarian	Tom Quinn	2,613	1.19
Reform	Richard Lucey	1,124	0.51
Total votes		218,855	100.0
Republican hold			

== District 4 ==
2002 Michigan's 4th congressional district election
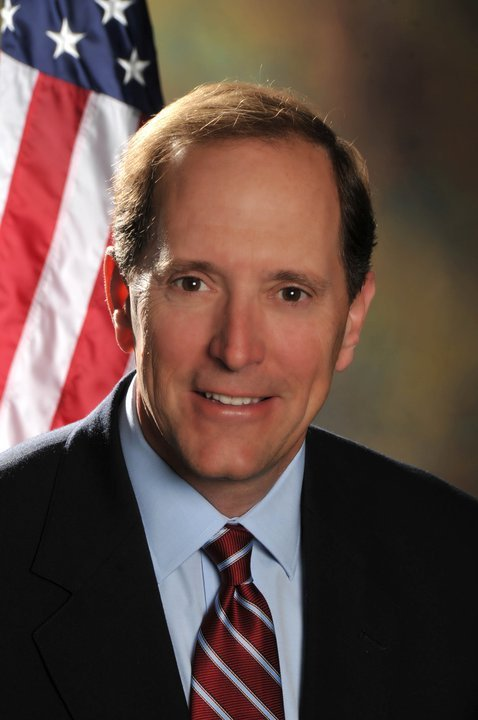

Nominee	Dave Camp	Lawrence Hollenbeck
Party	Republican	Democratic
Popular vote	149,090	65,950
Percentage	68.2%	30.2%
- County results Camp: 60–70% 70–80%
U.S. Representative before election
Dave Camp
Republican
Elected U.S. Representative
Dave Camp
Republican

=== Predictions ===
Source	Ranking	As of
Sabato's Crystal Ball	Safe R	November 4, 2002
New York Times	Safe R	October 14, 2002

=== Results ===
2002 Michigan's 4th congressional district election
Party	Candidate	Votes	%
Republican	Dave Camp (incumbent)	149,090	68.21
Democratic	Lawrence Hollenbeck	65,950	30.17
Green	Sterling Johnson	2,261	1.03
Libertarian	Al Chia Jr.	1,272	0.58
Total votes		218,573	100.0
Republican hold			

== District 5 ==
2002 Michigan's 5th congressional district election
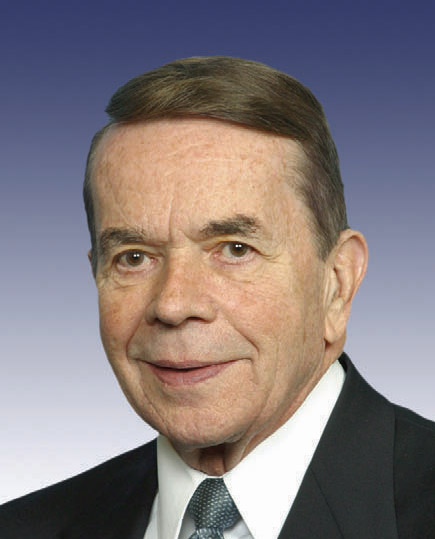

Nominee	Dale Kildee	Clint Foster
Party	Democratic	Libertarian
Popular vote	158,709	9,344
Percentage	91.6%	5.4%
- County results Kildee: 80–90% 90–100%
U.S. Representative before election
Dale Kildee
Democratic
Elected U.S. Representative
Dale Kildee
Democratic

=== Predictions ===
Source	Ranking	As of
Sabato's Crystal Ball	Safe D	November 4, 2002
New York Times	Safe D	October 14, 2002

=== Results ===
2002 Michigan's 5th congressional district election
Party	Candidate	Votes	%
Democratic	Dale Kildee (incumbent)	158,709	91.56
Libertarian	Clint Foster	9,344	5.39
Green	Harley Mikkelson	5,188	2.99
Write-In	Thom Moffitt	97	0.06
Write-In	William Fuzi	1	0.00
Total votes		173,339	100.0
Democratic hold			

== District 6 ==
2002 Michigan's 6th congressional district election
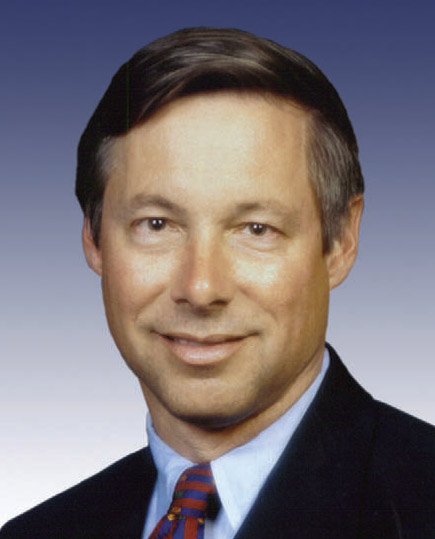

Nominee	Fred Upton	Gary Giguere Jr.
Party	Republican	Democratic
Popular vote	126,936	53,793
Percentage	69.2%	29.3%
- County results Upton: 60–70% 70–80%
U.S. Representative before election
Fred Upton
Republican
Elected U.S. Representative
Fred Upton
Republican

=== Predictions ===
Source	Ranking	As of
Sabato's Crystal Ball	Safe R	November 4, 2002
New York Times	Safe R	October 14, 2002

=== Results ===
2002 Michigan's 6th congressional district election
Party	Candidate	Votes	%
Republican	Fred Upton (incumbent)	126,936	69.17
Democratic	Gary Giguere Jr.	53,793	29.31
Reform	Richard Overton	2,788	1.52
Total votes		183,517	100.0
Republican hold			

== District 7 ==
2002 Michigan's 7th congressional district election
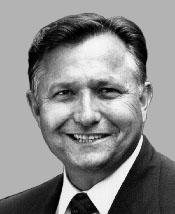

Nominee	Nick Smith	Mike Simpson
Party	Republican	Democratic
Popular vote	121,142	78,412
Percentage	59.7%	38.6%
- County results Smith: 50–60% 60–70%
U.S. Representative before election
Nick Smith
Republican
Elected U.S. Representative
Nick Smith
Republican

=== Predictions ===
Source	Ranking	As of
Sabato's Crystal Ball	Safe R	November 4, 2002
New York Times	Safe R	October 14, 2002

=== Results ===
2002 Michigan's 7th congressional district election
Party	Candidate	Votes	%
Republican	Nick Smith (incumbent)	121,142	59.66
Democratic	Mike Simpson	78,412	38.61
Libertarian	Ken Proctor	3,515	1.73
Total votes		203,069	100.0
Republican hold			

== District 8 ==
2002 Michigan's 8th congressional district election
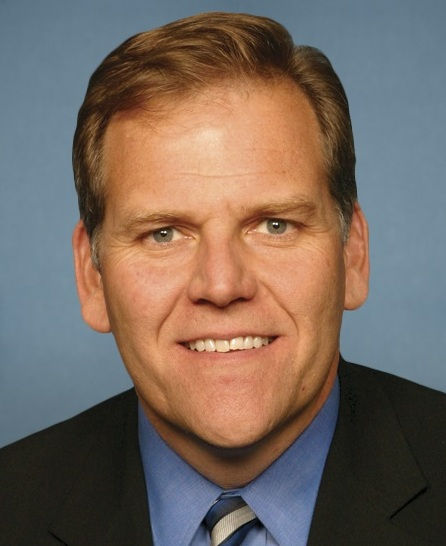

Nominee	Mike Rogers	Frank McAlpine
Party	Republican	Democratic
Popular vote	156,525	70,920
Percentage	67.9%	30.8%
- County results Rogers: 50–60% 60–70% 70–80%
U.S. Representative before election
Mike Rogers
Republican
Elected U.S. Representative
Mike Rogers
Republican

=== Predictions ===
Source	Ranking	As of
Sabato's Crystal Ball	Safe R	November 4, 2002
New York Times	Safe R	October 14, 2002

=== Results ===
2002 Michigan's 8th congressional district election
Party	Candidate	Votes	%
Republican	Mike Rogers (incumbent)	156,525	67.88
Democratic	Frank McAlpine	70,920	30.75
Libertarian	Thomas Yeutter	3,152	1.37
Total votes		230,597	100.0
Republican hold			

== District 9 ==
2002 Michigan's 9th congressional district election
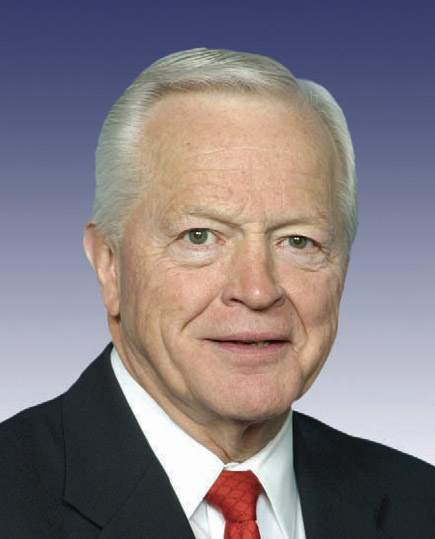

Nominee	Joe Knollenberg	David Fink
Party	Republican	Democratic
Popular vote	141,102	96,856
Percentage	58.1%	39.9%
- County results Knollenberg: 50–60%
U.S. Representative before election
Joe Knollenberg
Republican
Elected U.S. Representative
Joe Knollenberg
Republican

=== Predictions ===
Source	Ranking	As of
Sabato's Crystal Ball	Safe R	November 4, 2002
New York Times	Safe R	October 14, 2002

=== Results ===
2002 Michigan's 9th congressional district election
Party	Candidate	Votes	%
Republican	Joe Knollenberg (incumbent)	141,102	58.10
Democratic	David Fink	96,856	39.88
Libertarian	Robert Schubring	4,922	2.03
Total votes		242,880	100.0
Republican hold			

== District 10 ==
2002 Michigan's 10th congressional district election
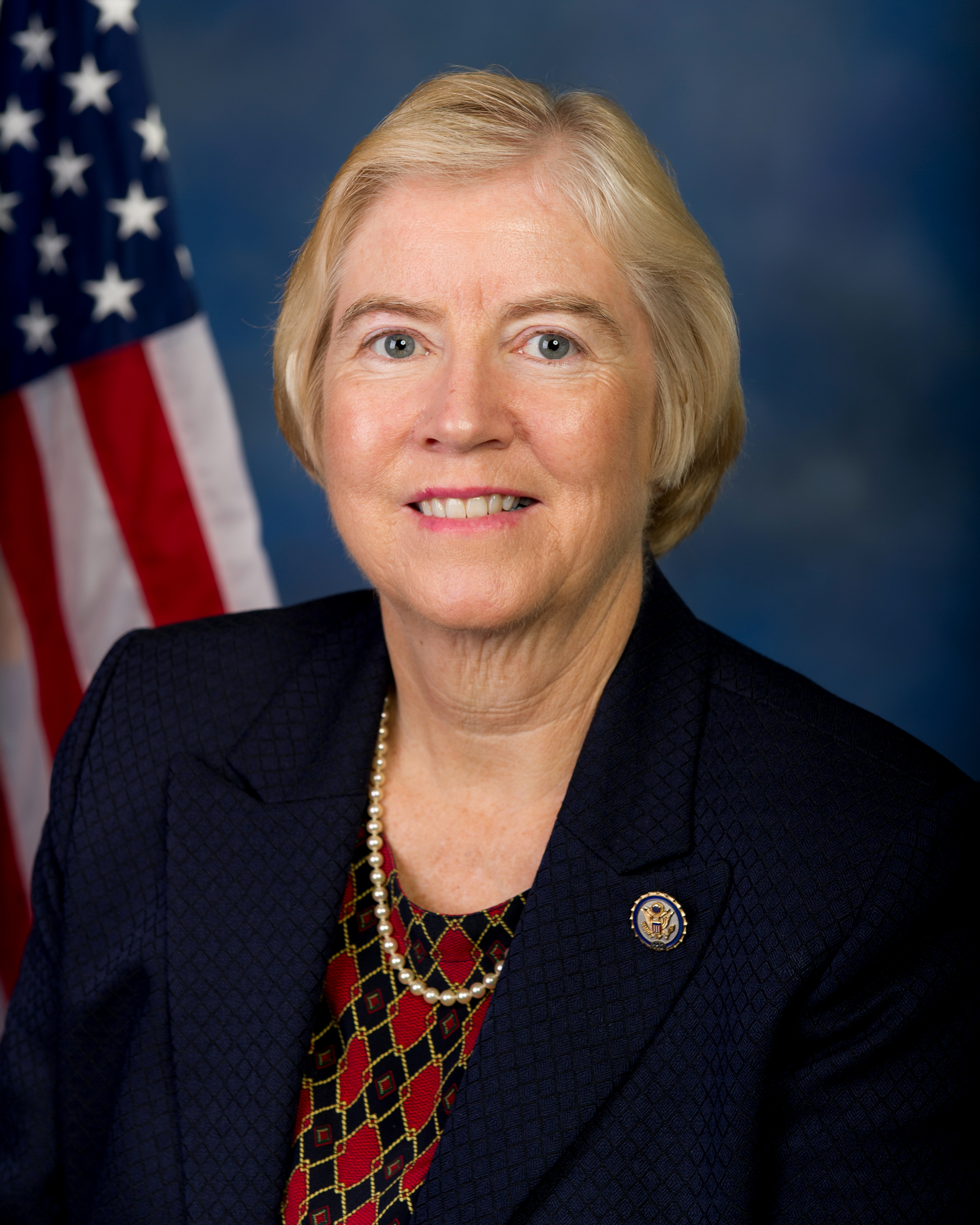

Nominee	Candice Miller	Carl Marlinga
Party	Republican	Democratic
Popular vote	137,339	77,053
Percentage	63.3%	35.5%
- County results Miller: 60–70% 70–80%
U.S. Representative before election
David Bonior
Democratic
Elected U.S. Representative
Candice Miller
Republican

=== Predictions ===
Source	Ranking	As of
Sabato's Crystal Ball	Lean R (flip)	November 4, 2002
New York Times	Safe R (flip)	October 14, 2002

=== Results ===
2002 Michigan's 10th congressional district election
Party	Candidate	Votes	%
Republican	Candice Miller	137,339	63.31
Democratic	Carl Marlinga	77,053	35.52
Libertarian	Renae Coon	2,536	1.17
Total votes		216,928	100.0
Republican win (new seat)			

== District 11 ==
2002 Michigan's 11th congressional district election
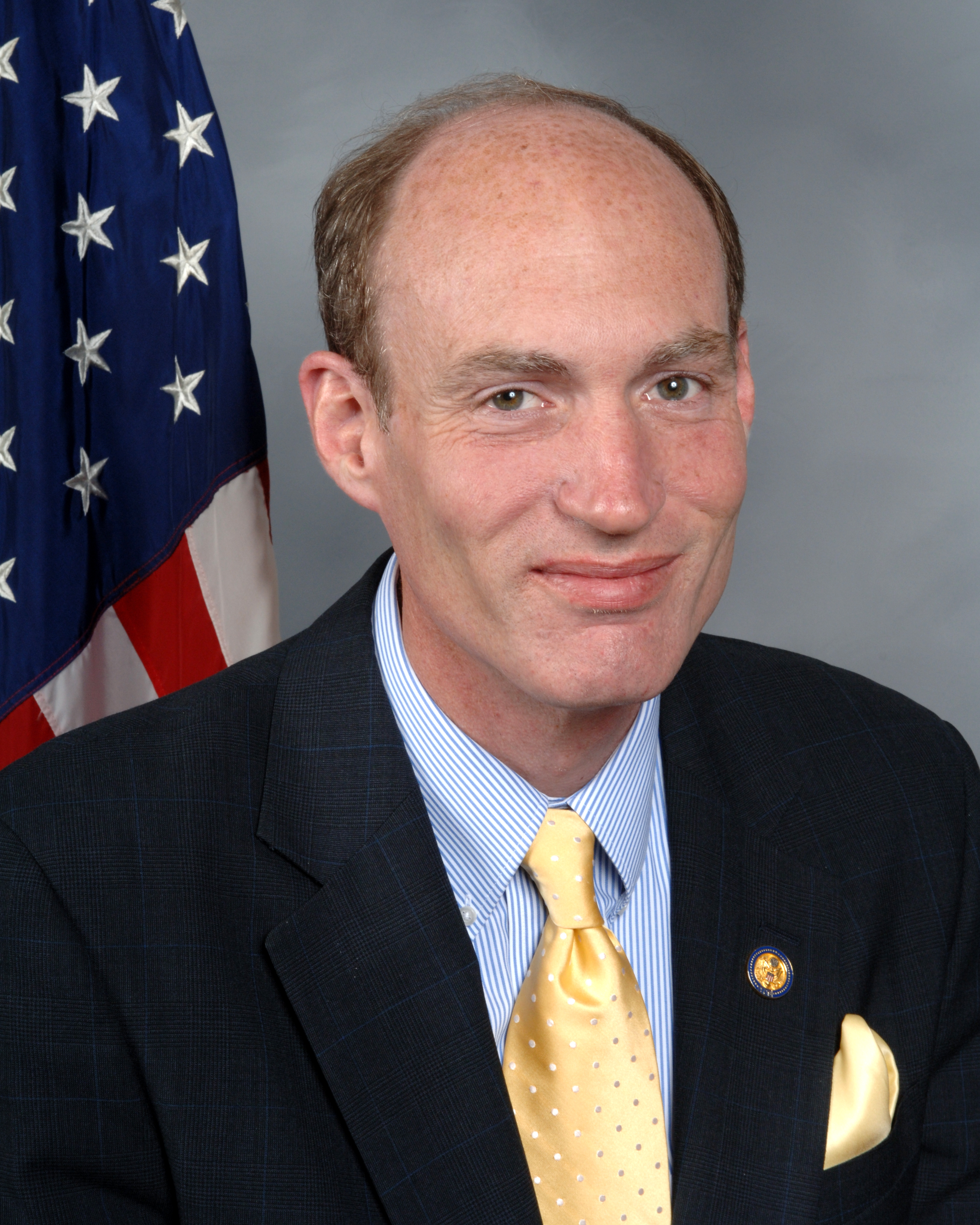

Nominee	Thaddeus McCotter	Kevin Kelley
Party	Republican	Democratic
Popular vote	126,050	87,402
Percentage	57.2%	39.7%
- County results Mccotter: 50–60% 60–70%
U.S. Representative before election
Joe Knollenberg
Republican
Elected U.S. Representative
Thaddeus McCotter
Republican

=== Predictions ===
Source	Ranking	As of
Sabato's Crystal Ball	Lean R	November 4, 2002
New York Times	Tossup	October 14, 2002

=== Results ===
2002 Michigan's 11th congressional district election
Party	Candidate	Votes	%
Republican	Thaddeus McCotter	126,050	57.19
Democratic	Kevin Kelley	87,402	39.66
Green	William Boyd	4,243	1.93
U.S. Taxpayers	Dan Malone	2,710	1.23
Total votes		220,405	100.0
Republican hold			

== District 12 ==
2002 Michigan's 12th congressional district election
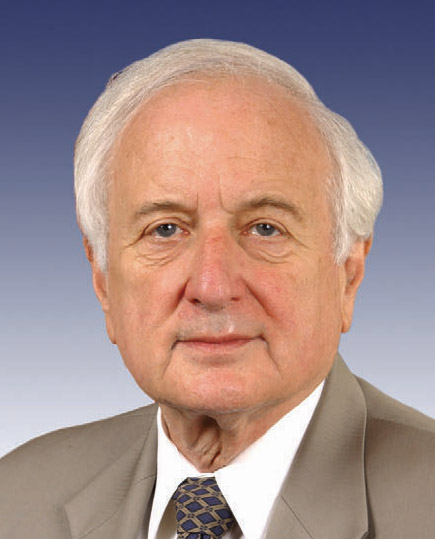

Nominee	Sander Levin	Harvey Dean
Party	Democratic	Republican
Popular vote	140,970	61,502
Percentage	68.3%	29.8%
- County results Levin: 60–70% 80–90%
U.S. Representative before election
Sander Levin
Democratic
Elected U.S. Representative
Sander Levin
Democratic

=== Predictions ===
Source	Ranking	As of
Sabato's Crystal Ball	Safe D	November 4, 2002
New York Times	Safe D	October 14, 2002

=== Results ===
2002 Michigan's 6th congressional district election
Party	Candidate	Votes	%
Democratic	Sander Levin (incumbent)	140,970	68.26
Republican	Harvey Dean	61,502	29.78
Libertarian	Dick Gach	2,694	1.30
U.S. Taxpayers	Steven Revis	1,362	0.66
Total votes		206,528	100.0
Democratic hold			

== District 13 ==
2002 Michigan's 13th congressional district election
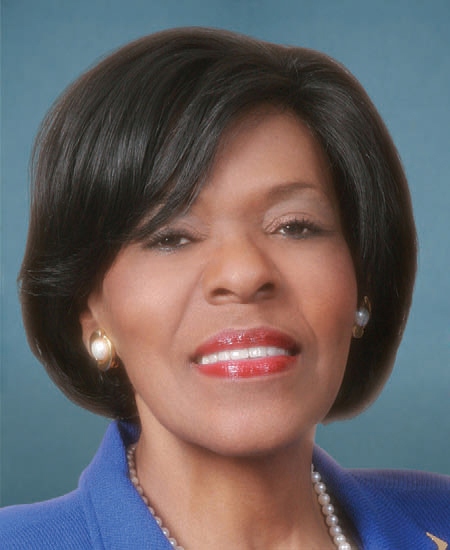

Nominee	Carolyn Kilpatrick	Raymond Warner
Party	Democratic	Libertarian
Popular vote	120,869	11,072
Percentage	91.6%	8.4%
- County results Kilpatrick: 90–100%
U.S. Representative before election
Carolyn Kilpatrick
Democratic
Elected U.S. Representative
Carolyn Kilpatrick
Democratic

=== Predictions ===
Source	Ranking	As of
Sabato's Crystal Ball	Safe D	November 4, 2002
New York Times	Safe D	October 14, 2002

=== Results ===
2002 Michigan's 13th congressional district election
Party	Candidate	Votes	%
Democratic	Carolyn Kilpatrick (incumbent)	120,869	91.61
Libertarian	Raymond Warner	11,072	8.39
Total votes		131,941	100.0
Democratic hold			

== District 14 ==
2002 Michigan's 14th congressional district election

Nominee	John Conyers	Dave Stone
Party	Democratic	Republican
Popular vote	145,285	26,544
Percentage	83.2%	15.2%
- County results Conyers: 80–90%
U.S. Representative before election
John Conyers
Democratic
Elected U.S. Representative
John Conyers
Democratic

=== Predictions ===
Source	Ranking	As of
Sabato's Crystal Ball	Safe D	November 4, 2002
New York Times	Safe D	October 14, 2002

=== Results ===
2002 Michigan's 14th congressional district election
Party	Candidate	Votes	%
Democratic	John Conyers (incumbent)	145,285	83.21
Republican	Dave Stone	26,544	15.20
Libertarian	Francis Schorr	1,532	0.88
Green	John Litle	1,247	0.71
Total votes		174,608	100.0
Democratic hold			

== District 15 ==
2002 Michigan's 15th congressional district election
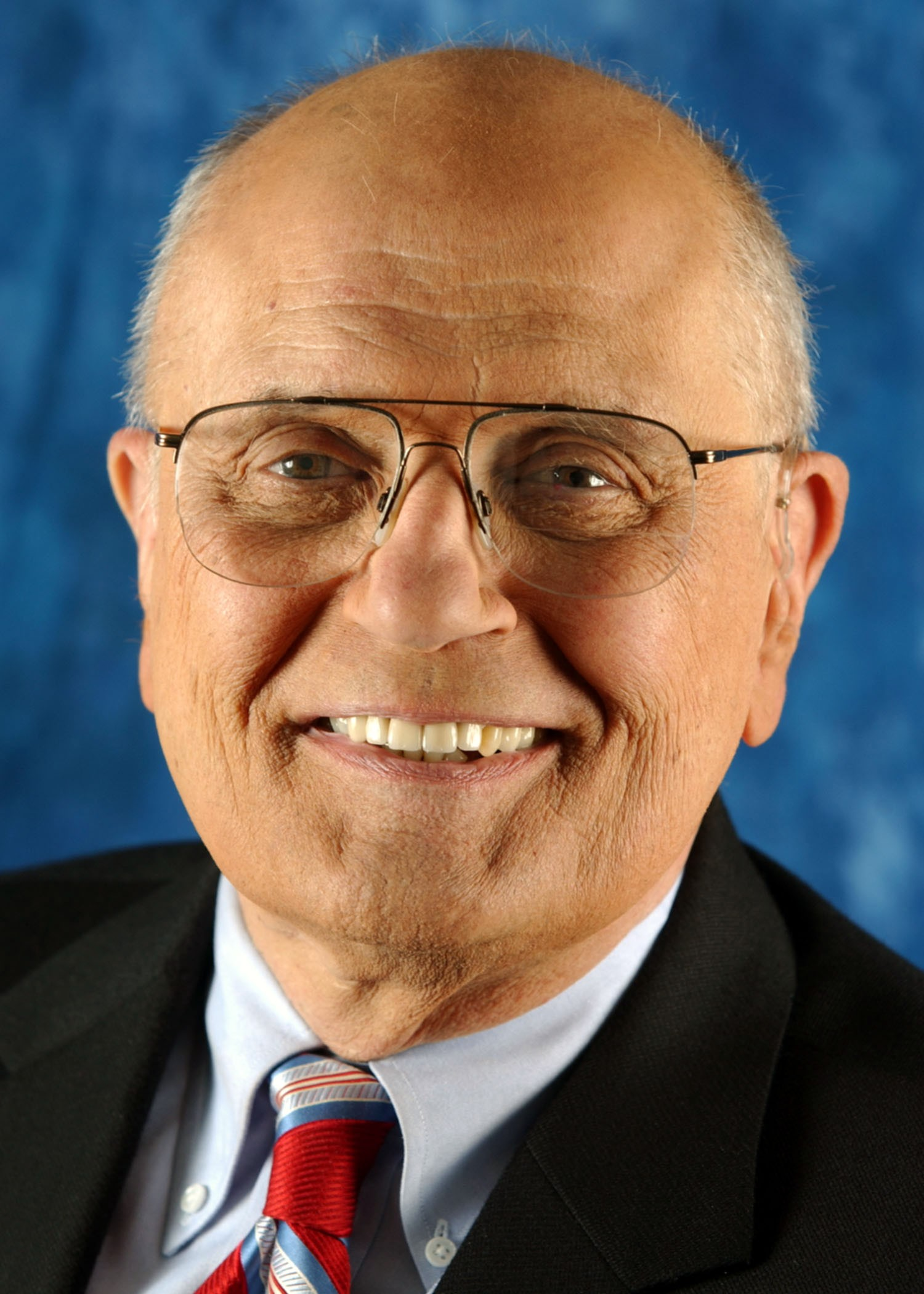

Nominee	John Dingell	Martin Kaltenbach
Party	Democratic	Republican
Popular vote	136,518	48,626
Percentage	72.2%	25.7%
- County results Dingell: 60–70% 70–80%
U.S. Representative before election
John Dingell
Democratic
Elected U.S. Representative
John Dingell
Democratic

=== Predictions ===
Source	Ranking	As of
Sabato's Crystal Ball	Safe D	November 4, 2002
New York Times	Safe D	October 14, 2002

=== Results ===
2002 Michigan's 15th congressional district election
Party	Candidate	Votes	%
Democratic	John Dingell (incumbent)	136,518	72.21
Republican	Martin Kaltenbach	48,626	25.72
Libertarian	Gregory Stempfle	3,919	2.07
Total votes		189,063	100.0
Democratic hold			
