= Michigan's 41st House of Representatives district =

American legislative district

Michigan's 41st State House of Representatives district
Representative
Julie Rogers; D–Kalamazoo
- Demographics: 60.6% White; 21.6% Black; 7.7% Hispanic; 3% Asian; 0.2% Native American; 0.3% Other; 6.6% Multiracial
- Population (2024): 89,203

Michigan's 41st House of Representatives district is a legislative district within the Michigan House of Representatives located in Kalamazoo County. The district was created in 1965, when the Michigan Supreme Court ordered the reapportionment of state legislative districts from a county-based system to a proportional one following the Supreme Court case Reynolds v. Sims. It is currently represented by Democrat Julie Rogers of Kalamazoo.

== List of representatives ==
Representative	Party	Years	Residence	Notes
Frederic J. "Bill" Marshall	Republican	1965–1968	Allen	Reapportioned from the former Hillsdale County district; died December 1968.
John P. Smeekens	Republican	1969 (Note: Elected in a 1969 special election to replace Rep. Frederic J. "Bill" Marshall, who died.)–1974	Sherwood (until around 1970); Coldwater	Previously served in the 9th Senate district.
Paul Porter	Democratic	1975–1978	Quincy	
Nick Hart Smith	Republican	1979–1982	Addison	
Michael Earl Nye	Republican	1983–1992	Litchfield	Redistricted to the 58th district.
Shirley Johnson	Republican	1993–1998	Royal Oak	Redistricted from the 68th district; term limited.
John Pappageorge	Republican	1999–2004	Troy	Term limited.
Robert M. Gosselin	Republican	2005–2006	Troy	Previously served in the 42nd district; term limited.
Marty Knollenberg	Republican	2007–2012	Troy	Term limited.
Martin Howrylak	Republican	2013–2018	Troy	Term limited.
Padma Kuppa	Democratic	2019–2022	Troy	
Julie Rogers	Democratic	2023–present	Kalamazoo	Redistricted from the 60th district.
Jen Strebs	Democratic	(Note: Member-elect.)	Kalamazoo	

== Historical district boundaries ==
Map	Description	Apportionment Plan	Notes
	Branch County; Hillsdale County; Lenawee County (part); Rollin Township (part); Woodstock Township (part)	1964 Apportionment Plan	
	Lenawee County (part): Rollin Township; Hillsdale County (part): Excluding Wright Township; St. Joseph County (part): Mendon Township; Leonidas Township; Fawn River Township	1972 Apportionment Plan	
	Branch County; Hillsdale County	1982 Apportionment Plan	
	Oakland County (part): Clawson; Royal Oak (part); Troy (part)	1992 Apportionment Plan	
	Oakland County (part): Clawson; Troy	2001 Apportionment Plan	
	Oakland County (part): Clawson; Troy	2011 Apportionment Plan	
	Kalamazoo County (part): Kalamazoo (part); Kalamazoo Township (part); Portage (part)	2021 Apportionment Plan (Note: Referred to as the Hickory plan.)	

== Recent elections ==
=== 2020s ===
2026 Michigan House of Representatives election
Party	Candidate	Votes	%
Democratic	Jen Strebs	27,715	80.59
Republican	Nicole C. Sabel	5,971	17.36
Libertarian	Rafael Wolf	702	2.04
Total votes		34,388	100
Democratic hold			

2024 Michigan House of Representatives election
Party	Candidate	Votes	%
Democratic	Julie M. Rogers (incumbent)	30,106	75.64
Republican	Terry Haines	8,725	21.92
Libertarian	Rafael Wolf	973	2.44
Total votes		39,804	100
Democratic hold			

2022 Michigan House of Representatives election
Party	Candidate	Votes	%
Democratic	Julie M. Rogers	23,214	76.98
Republican	Terry Haines	6,218	20.62
Libertarian	Rafael Wolf	725	2.4
Total votes		30,157	100
Democratic hold			

2020 Michigan House of Representatives election
Party	Candidate	Votes	%
Democratic	Padma Kuppa (incumbent)	30,601	55.04
Republican	Andrew J. Sosnowski	24,992	44.96
Total votes		55,593	100
Democratic hold			

=== 2010s ===
2018 Michigan House of Representatives election
Party	Candidate	Votes	%
Democratic	Padma Kuppa	22,320	51.32
Republican	Doug Tietz	21,170	48.68
Total votes		43,490	100
Democratic gain from Republican			

2016 Michigan House of Representatives election
Party	Candidate	Votes	%
Republican	Martin Howrylak	26,708	56.45%
Democratic	Cyndi Peltonen	20,606	43.55%
Total votes		47,314	100.00%
Republican hold			

2014 Michigan House of Representatives election
Party	Candidate	Votes	%
Republican	Martin Howrylak	18,356	55.77
Democratic	Mary Kerwin	14,555	44.23
Total votes		32,911	100.0
Republican hold			

2012 Michigan House of Representatives election
Party	Candidate	Votes	%
Republican	Martin Howrylak	23,404	50.46
Democratic	Mary Kerwin	22,977	49.54
Total votes		46,381	100.0
Republican hold			

2010 Michigan House of Representatives election
Party	Candidate	Votes	%
Republican	Marty Knollenberg	22,538	66.26
Democratic	Ed Spillers	11,477	33.74
Total votes		34,015	100.0
Republican hold			

2008 Michigan House of Representatives election
Party	Candidate	Votes	%
Republican	Marty Knollenberg	27,805	57.79
Democratic	Evan Ross Treharne	20,313	42.21
Total votes		48,118	100.0
Republican hold			
