= Padma Kuppa =

American politician (born 1965)

Member of the Michigan House of Representatives from the 41st district
- In office January 1, 2019 – December 31, 2022
- Preceded by: Martin Howrylak
- Succeeded by: Julie Rogers

Personal details
- Born: Padma Kuppa; August 10, 1965 (age 61) Bhilai, India
- Party: Democratic
- Spouse: Sudhakar Tadepalli
- Children: 2
- Education: National Institute of Technology, Warangal (1988)
- Occupation: Mechanical engineer
- Website: Campaign website

Padma Kuppa (born August 10, 1965) was a member of the Michigan House of Representatives from the 41st House District, which encompasses the cities of Troy and Clawson, from 2019 to 2022. She was the first Asian immigrant and Hindu to serve in the Michigan Legislature.

Kuppa is a mechanical engineer by trade and a community organizer. She has served as President of the Troy Historical Society, which oversees the Troy Historic Village, and is a founding member of the Troy-area Interfaith Group. She is tri-lingual in English, Hindi, and Telugu.

In 2022, Kuppa unsuccessfully ran for the Michigan Senate in the new 9th Senate District following the decennial redistricting process.

== Early life and education ==
Kuppa was born on August 10, 1965, in Bhilai, Chhattisgarh, India into a Telugu family. In 1969, her father began attending Stony Brook University on Long Island, New York, as a graduate student, and later became a post-doctoral fellow. Her mother also went back to school and eventually earned a PhD in biology from Stony Brook and was a post-doctoral fellow at MIT and Georgetown University.

In 1970, during her parents' studies in the United States, Kuppa and her family moved to Long Island where she began attending kindergarten. When she was 15 years old, Kuppa and her family returned to India, unlike most immigrants of the era. Kuppa recalled of her parents' decision: "That move was very difficult. I did not think or behave as an Indian. I was Indian on the outside and American on the inside." She has also said of this time in her life, "I didn't feel at home. I had an American accent, I had an American attitude. And so I think that it wasn't just the best age to move, to shift cultures."

Returning to India with her family in 1981, Kuppa finished high school at Stanley Girls High School and later graduated from Regional Engineering College Warangal (now National Institute of Technology, Warangal). Kuppa was the first woman to earn a degree in mechanical engineering from the university.

In 1988, Kuppa returned to the United States to attend graduate school at Stony Brook University, her parents' alma mater, as a foreign student. In 1998, Kuppa and her husband moved to Troy, Michigan.

== Career ==
Kuppa is a founding member of the Troy-area Interfaith Group, as well as the local Bharatiya Temple's Outreach Committee. She has served as a board member and advisory board member of the Women's Interfaith Solutions for Dialogue and Outreach in Detroit (WISDOM). She became board president of the Troy Historical Society, which oversees the Troy Historic Village, in October 2018.

Kuppa worked with Chrysler as a mechanical engineer and project manager for over five years. She later worked as a business analyst at Ally Financial. Kuppa served on the City of Troy's Planning Commission from 2015 to 2018, having been appointed by the mayor and confirmed by the city council. She was later elected to serve on the city's Zoning Board of Appeals from 2017 to 2018.

In 2018, Kuppa was elected to the Michigan House of Representatives. She assumed office in 2019 for the 100th Michigan Legislature, representing House District 41, which encompasses the cities of Troy and Clawson. A Democrat, Kuppa defeated Republican Doug Tietz in the general election, earning 51.3 percent of the vote versus 48.7 percent for Tietz. Kuppa's predecessor, term-limited Republican Martin Howrylak, attended her swearing-in ceremony. During her first term, Kuppa was named Assistant Whip for her caucus. She was also selected to serve on the Energy Committee and the Local Government and Municipal Finance Committee.

In 2020, Kuppa won re-election against Republican Andrew Sosnoski in the general election. She earned 55.04 percent of the vote to Sosnoski's 44.96 percent. For the 101st Michigan Legislature during her second term, Kuppa was selected to serve on the Tax Policy Committee and Rules and Competitiveness Committee, in addition to returning to serve on the Local Government and Municipal Finance Committee. She was also selected to serve as an alternate member for the Michigan Legislative Council. In 2021, Kuppa received the Michigan United Cerebral Palsy Public Policy Award for her work with the disability and business communities.

In 2022, Kuppa unsuccessfully ran for the Michigan Senate in the new 9th Senate District following the decennial redistricting process.

== Personal life ==
Kuppa resides in Troy, Michigan, with her husband, Sudhakar Tadepalli. They have two children.

Kuppa is Hindu and a member of the Bharatiya Temple of Metropolitan Detroit. She is multi-lingual and speaks English, Telugu, and Hindi; the latter of which is the most spoken minority language in the district that Kuppa represents.
