= Shirley Johnson =

American politician (1937–2021)

Member of the Michigan Senate from the 13th district
- In office March 23, 1999 – 2006
- Preceded by: Mike Bouchard
- Succeeded by: John Pappageorge

Member of the Michigan House of Representatives from the 41st district
- In office January 1, 1993 – 1998
- Preceded by: Michael Earl Nye
- Succeeded by: John Pappageorge

Member of the Michigan House of Representatives from the 68th district
- In office January 1, 1981 – 1992
- Preceded by: David L. Campbell
- Succeeded by: Dianne Byrum

Personal details
- Born: December 14, 1937
- Died: January 14, 2021 (aged 83)
- Party: Republican (until 2006)
- Spouse: Cliff
- Children: 2
- Education: Oakland Community College; Wayne State University; Michigan State University

Shirley Johnson (December 14, 1937 – January 14, 2021) was an American politician who was a member of the Michigan Senate from 1999 to 2006.

== Early life and education ==
Johnson was born on December 14, 1937. She attended Oakland Community College and Wayne State University, and graduated from Michigan State University.

== Career ==
On November 4, 1980, Johnson was elected to the Michigan House of Representatives where she represented the 68th district from January 14, 1981, to 1992. On November 3, 1992, Johnson was again elected to the Michigan House of Representatives where she represented the 41st district from January 13, 1993, to 1998. On March 16, 1999, Johnson was elected to the Michigan Senate in a special election after the resignation of Mike Bouchard. In the state senate, she represented the 13th district and served from March 23, 1999, to 2006. Johnson left the Republican Party after leaving the Michigan Legislature.

== Personal life ==
Johnson married Cliff in 1957. Together they had two children. Johnson was a Presbyterian.
