= Robert Gosselin =

American politician (1951–2023)

Member of the Michigan House of Representatives from the 41st district
- In office January 1, 2005 – December 31, 2006
- Preceded by: John Pappageorge
- Succeeded by: Marty Knollenberg

Robert Morrison Gosselin (1951-2023) was a conservative Republican politician in Oakland County, Michigan and is an Oakland County Commissioner.

== Biography ==
Gosselin was born in Berkley, Michigan and attended Berkley High School. He attended, but did not graduate from Lawrence Technological University, where he studied engineering. He is also a licensed builder, licensed realtor and licensed heating contractor.

He is married to Jan Gosselin and has three children.

== Political career ==
Gosselin was elected to the Troy City Council in 1993. He served until 1997.

In 1998, he was elected to the Michigan House of Representatives to represent the then-42nd District which included portions of Rochester Hills and Troy. He was re-elected to the same seat in 2000. In 2002, after his district was consolidated into Troy and Clawson, he ran for and lost a Michigan Senate seat against incumbent Shirley Johnson in the 13th District. In 2004, Gosselin again sat in the Michigan House, this time representing the new 41st District.

In 2006, Gosselin became a candidate for County Commissioner in the 13th District which includes the southern portion of Rochester Hills and a northern portion of Troy with a portion of Bloomfield Township. He unseated a moderate Republican incumbent, Will Molnar, in the primary. He handily won his general election bid for that seat. According to the Oakland Press: However, with Gosselin term-limited out-of-office, the younger Knollenberg became the Republican nominee for State House in 2006, defeating Mike Bosnic in the August 2006 primary. Bosnic, who also ran in 2004 in a three-way race against Gosselin, was endorsed by Gosselin in 2006. Despite Gosselin's endorsement, Knollenberg won by 7%, or roughly 700 votes, over Bosnic.

=== Political philosophy ===
Gosselin has achieved a reputation of being a conservative who appeals to the religious right as well as a strong libertarian bloc of Oakland County politics. As such, he has gained the reputation of challenging establishment mainstream, moderate, and liberal Republicans. This was the case in his 2002 bid for the State Senate as well as his 2004 House election.

Gosselin has traditionally supported a strong relationship between State Government and Judeo-Christian religion. He has sponsored various legislation to place the words "In God We Trust" and the Ten Commandments at the Michigan State Capitol in Lansing. In support of this legislation, which failed, but ultimately won by putting them in the Lansing Capital thru House Resolutions HCR 0056 of 2002 and HR 0024 of 2005. Gosselin traveled the state with fellow Republican Representative Jack Hoogendyk with the 2.6-ton granite tablets involved in the 2003 Justice Roy Moore Ten Commandments controversy. Gosselin holds the controversial belief that the U.S. Constitution does not deliberately dictate a separation between church and state and instead is a mere protection of all religious beliefs.

Consistent with his conservative philosophy, Gosselin also strongly opposes abortion. In the legislature he supported bills that would make it illegal to coerce a woman into having a legal abortion, requiring ultrasounds to be shown prior to abortions, to prohibit physicians and health facilities from accepting prepayment for abortions, and to establish a "Choose Life Fund," funded with revenue from the sale of a "Choose Life" specialty license plate.

Despite his interest in government regulation of abortion and association of government with religion, Gosselin has maintained significant support for and from libertarians. For instance, he endorsed libertarian David Eisenbacher for City Council in Troy. This is because of his strong opposition to state and local regulations, taxation and benefits. While in the legislature, he voted against every single budget citing overspending in State Government. He was the author of a package of legislation known as "Michigan Citizens First," which cut welfare benefits from illegal immigrants. He consistently favored substantial cuts to government welfare programs.

However, with Gosselin term-limited out-of-office, the younger Knollenberg became the Republican nominee for State House in 2006, defeating Mike Bosnic in the August 2006 primary. Bosnic, who also ran in 2004 in a three-way race against Gosselin, was endorsed by Gosselin in 2006. Despite Gosselin's endorsement, Knollenberg won by 7%, or roughly 700 votes, over Bosnic.

=== 2006 State Senate election ===
In 2006, Gosselin initially ran for the Michigan Senate against fellow State Representative Shelley Taub. Many state political observers were anticipating a lively free-for-all between these two. This prediction was based upon the open animus between former Senator Shirley Johnson and Gosselin. Gosselin accused Johnson, who is a moderate Republican, of accepting donations from a pro-Gay group. He also attacked her position on abortion. Johnson actively worked for Marty Knollenberg's 2004 campaign against Gosselin. A joke between many observers was that if Gosselin were to win the Republican nomination, Johnson would endorse the Democrat, and one Republican insider seriously acknowledged this possibility.

When Democrat Andy Levin, son of Congressman Sander Levin and nephew of U.S. Senator Carl Levin, entered the race, however, Republican leadership became concerned. Former Michigan Senator and fellow Troy State Representative John Pappageorge was coaxed by the Michigan Republican Party to run for the 13th District seat, as they believed he was the only one with the name recognition and fundraising ability to retain the seat in the general election. When Pappageorge entered the race, Gosselin dropped out.

Pappageorge defeated Taub in the primary in August 2006 by a two-to-one margin. He narrowly defeated Andy Levin in one of the closest and most controversial state senate races in November, by a margin less than that of the vote totals accumulated by the Green Party candidate.

=== Election history ===
Michigan House 42nd District Election Results, 1998–2000
1998 Candidate	Party	Popular votes	Vote percentage
Bob Gosselin	Republican	20,285	68%
Jacquelyn Moore	Democrat	9,712	32%
2000 Candidate	Party	Popular votes	Vote percentage
Bob Gosselin	Republican	27,104	67%
Jerry Bixby	Democrat	13,279	32%

Michigan Senate 13th District Republican Primary Election Results, 2002
2002 Candidate	Party	Popular votes	Vote percentage
Shirley Johnson	Republican	13,412	55%
Bob Gosselin	Republican	11,141	45%

Michigan House 41st District Republican Primary Election Results, 2004
2004 Candidate	Party	Popular votes	Vote percentage
Bob Gosselin	Republican	3,754	38%
Marty Knollenberg	Republican	2,851	29%
Mike Bosnic	Republican	2,734	28%
Kathleen O'Laughlin	Republican	464	5%
