= Paul Porter (Michigan politician) =

American politician

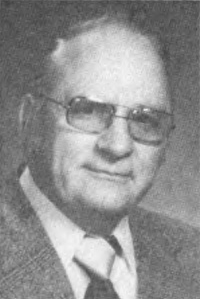

Member of the Michigan House of Representatives from the 41st district
- In office January 1, 1975 – December 31, 1978
- Preceded by: John P. Smeekens
- Succeeded by: Nick Smith

Personal details
- Born: December 23, 1907
- Died: April 22, 2002 (aged 94)
- Party: Democratic

Paul Porter (December 23, 1907 – April 22, 2002) was a Michigan politician.

== Early life ==
Porter was born on December 23, 1907.

== Career ==
Porter was an alternate delegate to the Democratic National Convention from Michigan in 1968. In 1968, 1969, and 1970, Porter ran unsuccessfully for the Michigan House of Representatives seat representing the 41st district. In 1972 and 1976, Porter was run unsuccessfully for the position of presidential elector. On November 5, 1974, Porter was elected to the Michigan House of Representatives where he represented the 41st district from January 8, 1975 to December 31, 1978. Porter ran for this position again in 1978 and 1980, but was not re-elected. Porter was a delegate to the Democratic National Convention from Michigan in 1980. In 1982, Porter ran unsuccessfully for the Michigan Senate seat representing the 19th district.

== Personal life ==
During his time in the Michigan Legislature, Porter lived in Quincy, Michigan.

== Death ==
Porter died on April 22, 2002.
