= Marty Knollenberg =

American politician (born 1963)

Member of the Michigan Senate from the 13th district
- In office January 1, 2015 – January 3, 2019
- Preceded by: John Pappageorge
- Succeeded by: Mallory McMorrow

Member of the Michigan House of Representatives from the 41st district
- In office January 1, 2007 – December 31, 2012
- Preceded by: Robert Gosselin
- Succeeded by: Martin Howrylak

Personal details
- Born: September 21, 1963 (age 63)
- Party: Republican
- Parent: Joe Knollenberg (father)

Martin "Marty" Knollenberg (born September 2, 1963) is a Republican politician from the U.S. state of Michigan who previously served in the Michigan Senate from the 13th district. He was a member of the Michigan State House of Representatives, representing the 41st District which covers the cities of Troy and Clawson in Oakland County. He is the son of former U.S. Congressman Joe Knollenberg, who represented Michigan's 9th congressional district from 1993 until 2009.

Knollenberg was elected to the State House in 2006 and re-elected in 2008 and 2010. He was term limited in 2012 and succeeded by Republican Martin Howrylak. He had previously served as an Oakland County Commissioner from 2002 to 2004 and Oakland County Parks and Recreation commissioner from 2004 to 2006. He was the subject of controversy in 2015 for stating "the non-white population" was a contributor to the failure of Michigan's worst-performing schools in a state senate education committee meeting, adding that "We can't make an African American white." He later apologized for his "clunky" choice of words.

== Education ==
Knollenberg has a bachelor's degree in history from Albion College.

== Political career ==
Knollenberg has served three terms in the Michigan State House. He pushed for legislation in 2011 that would prevent teachers from receiving pay increases while they negotiate their labor contracts. He was the chief sponsor of House Bill 4054, a controversial right-to-work law in Michigan.

During his tenure in the Michigan House, Knollenberg sat on the redistricting committee. Following his father's defeat in 2008 by Gary Peters, Knollenberg was expected to use his position to gerrymander the district. Political analyst Bill Ballenger said "I didn't think there's any question that he would love to seek revenge on behalf of his father if the circumstances are right — especially if it's against Peters."

In early 2013 Marty Knollenberg was among candidates planning to run for mayor of Troy after mayor Janice Daniels was recalled in the November 2012 election.

== Elections ==
=== 2004 election ===
Knollenberg was a candidate for election in the 2004 Republican primary for the 41st District House seat, being vacated by term-limited representative John Pappageorge. He faced former-State Representative Bob Gosselin who was running for his final term after leaving office in 2002 to run for state Senate, and upstart candidate Mike Bosnic.

Bosnic was also a subject of Knollenberg's literature. He was accused by Knollenberg of accepting an illegal $2,500 contribution from the Heroes of Public Education, which was then a new PAC subject to a smaller campaign contribution limit. Campaign finance reports later revealed that the Secretary of State required Bosnic to repay $2,000 of the donations because it exceeded campaign limits.

Despite Pappageorge's endorsement of Knollenberg, the August primary was won by Gosselin with 38% of the vote, with Knollenberg garnering 29% and Bosnic 28%.

=== 2006 election ===
In the August 2006 primary, Knollenberg faced Clawson School Board Trustee and attorney Mike Bosnic. Knollenberg won by a 53.5-46.5% margin. The contest was labeled by Michigan Information & Research Service (MIRS), a Lansing-insider political publication, as the fourth most interesting primary in Michigan.

Knollenberg defeated Democratic college student Eric Gregory in the November general election by a 58-42% margin.

=== 2008 election ===
Knollenberg was re-elected with 57.46% of the vote for his second term in November 2008, defeating opponent Evan Treharne (41.98%), a 24-year-old schoolteacher. In the campaign, Knollenberg made attacks ads about Treharne's age.

=== 2010 election ===
Knollenberg was re-elected to the Michigan House for a final time in November 2010.

=== 2012 election ===
Knollenberg was term-limited in 2012 and in 2011 formed a congressional campaign committee in anticipation of running for a seat in the US House of Representatives. He abandoned his plans after being redistricted into the same district as Thaddeus McCotter. Knollenberg ran for the office of Treasurer of Oakland County and was defeated by incumbent Andy Meisner.

=== 2013 election ===
Knollenberg ran in the special election to replace Janice Daniels as the Mayor of Troy, Michigan. He lost to Dane Slater, who was serving as interim mayor.

=== 2014 election ===
Knollenberg was elected to the Michigan Senate in 2014 after the Troy Republican survived a crowded primary GOP field of candidates that included former Reps. Chuck Moss and Andrew Raczkowski. In the general election, Knollenberg defeated Democrat Cyndi Peltonen 58 to 42 percent.

=== 2018 Election ===
Knollenberg ran for re-election to another term in the Michigan Senate. After running unopposed in the Republican primary, he was defeated in the general election by Democrat Mallory McMorrow 48 to 52 percent.

== Controversy ==
Knollenberg was the subject of controversy in 2015 for statements he made during a state senate education committee meeting that suggested failing schools could be fixed if African American students could be made white. He stated, "You mentioned why these school fail, and you mentioned the economically disadvantaged and non-white population are contributors to that. You know, we can’t fix that. We can’t make an African American white. It is what it is, and we can't fix that."
