= Martin Howrylak =

American politician

Member of the Michigan House of Representatives from the 41st district
- In office January 1, 2013 – January 3, 2019
- Preceded by: Marty Knollenberg
- Succeeded by: Padma Kuppa

Personal details
- Born: 1974 (age 51–52) Detroit, Michigan
- Party: Republican
- Education: University of Michigan

Howrylak (right) in 2007

Martin Howrylak (born 1974) is a Michigan politician who formerly served as a Republican member of the Michigan House of Representatives. He represented the 41st District covering Troy and Clawson. He was elected in 2012, succeeding Marty Knollenberg who was term-limited out of office. Previously he was a three-term city council member for Troy, Michigan. Howrylak was a member of the Libertarian Party of Michigan when elected to the Troy City Council.

Howrylak has a bachelor's degree in geological sciences and a master's in accounting, both from the University of Michigan. He is a Roman Catholic. Howrylak was born and raised in Troy.
