= John Pappageorge =

American politician (1931–2026)

Member of the Michigan Senate from the 13th district
- In office January 1, 2007 – December 31, 2014
- Preceded by: Shirley Johnson
- Succeeded by: Marty Knollenberg

Member of the Michigan House of Representatives from the 41st district
- In office January 1, 1999 – December 31, 2004
- Preceded by: Shirley Johnson
- Succeeded by: Robert Gosselin

County Commissioner, Oakland County, Michigan
- In office 1989–1992

Council Member, Policy Planning Staff
- In office 1981–1984

Personal details
- Born: John George Pappageorge; July 19, 1931 Detroit, Michigan, U.S.
- Died: June 9, 2026 (aged 94)
- Party: Republican
- Spouse(s): Helen Pappageorge (m. 1958, d. 1993); Christina Burnard (m. 1997)
- Children: 3 (1 stepchild)
- Education: United States Military Academy (BS); University of Maryland, College Park (MA); U.S. Army War College
- Profession: Army Officer; Diplomat; Business Executive; Politician
- Awards: Distinguished Service Medal, Superior Service Medal, four Legions of Merit, Bronze Star, nine Air Medals, Combat Infantryman's Badge, Vietnamese Cross of Gallantry, Ranger Tab, Parachutist Badge, Pathfinder Badge

Military service
- Branch/service: United States Army
- Years of service: 1954–1984
- Rank: Colonel
- Battles/wars: Vietnam War

John George Pappageorge (July 19, 1931 – June 9, 2026) was an American politician who was a member of the Michigan State Senate in the United States.

== Life and career ==
John Pappageorge was born to a Greek family on the east side of Detroit, Michigan, on July 19, 1931.

Pappageorge entered the United States Army after graduating from high school in Detroit, enrolling in the United States Military Academy at West Point. From West Point he received a B.S. in engineering in 1954. He later obtained a M.A. in Government and Politics from the University of Maryland in 1971 and attended the U.S. Army War College in 1973.

He served 30 years of active duty in the Infantry, including two combat tours in Vietnam. During the second tour, he served as a battalion commander. There he was highly decorated, including receiving the Distinguished Service Medal, Superior Service Medal, four Legions of Merit, the Bronze Star, nine Air Medals, the Combat Infantryman Badge, and the Vietnam Gallantry Cross. He is also Airborne, Ranger, and Pathfinder qualified.

While in the Army, Pappageorge served as Special Assistant to General Alexander Haig, who was then the Commander in Chief, U.S. European Command (CinCUSEUR) and Supreme Allied Commander Europe (SACEUR) (and later U.S. Secretary of State). Pappageorge conducted shuttle diplomacy between Greece and Turkey that returned Greek forces to NATO's integrated military structure. He spent his last four years in the Army, 1981–1984, as a member of the Secretary of State's Policy Planning Council.

Pappageorge retired as a colonel in 1984, settling in Troy, Michigan in Oakland County. After retirement from the Army, Pappageorge became Director of Business and Strategic Planning at General Dynamics Land Systems Division. From 1989 to 1992, Pappageorge served as an Oakland county commissioner. He was the Republican candidate for Congress in Michigan's 12th congressional district in 1992, 1994, and 1996. In 1995, he served as First Vice-Chair of the Republican Party of Michigan.

He was married for 35 years to his first wife, Helen. She died from pancreatic cancer in 1993. He married Cristina Burnard (now Cristina Pappageorge) in 1997. Pappageorge has a son and two daughters. His son George is an Army reserve Lieutenant Colonel who has served in Iraq in support of Operation Iraqi Freedom.

Pappageorge died on June 9, 2026, at the age of 94.

== Congressional campaigns ==
=== 1992 election ===
In 1992, Pappageorge ran for the United States House of Representatives against Sander Levin. This was the first serious Republican opposition against Levin, after his congressional district absorbed a Republican-leaning spur of Oakland County in redistricting. Levin won by 7%.

=== 1994 election ===
Pappageorge ran against Levin for the second time in 1994, this time managing to pull within 5%, despite being outspent more than 3-to-1. Pappageorge benefitted from Newt Gingrich's Contract with America and the 1994 Republican Revolution.

=== 1996 election ===
In his third consecutive run against Levin, he was not able to shore up as much support, losing 57.4%-40.5%.

== Michigan House of Representatives ==
Pappageorge served in the Michigan State House of Representatives from 1999 to 2004, when he retired due to term limits. He spent four years on the House Appropriations Committee, and served his final two years as Chair of the Joint Committee on Administrative Rules and as a member of the Employment Relations, Training and Safety Committee, the Judiciary Committee, the Senior Health, Security, and Retirement Committee, and the Veterans Affairs and Homeland Security Committee.

=== 1998 election ===
In 1998, he ran for the Michigan State House 41st District seat, which then encompassed southern Troy, Clawson and northern Royal Oak in Oakland County. He defeated Troy City Councilmember Matt Pryor in the Republican Primary. He went on to defeat Democrat David Richards in the November general election. .

=== 2000 election ===
In 2000, he was re-elected facing nominal opposition with no primary challengers.

=== 2002 election ===
Pappageorge was again re-elected again to his final term under term-limits in 2002 in the newly created 41st District (through decennial redistricting), a district which composed roughly the same area. He faced nominal opposition and no primary challengers.

=== 2004 election remarks ===
In 2004, Pappageorge was quoted in the Detroit Free Press as saying "If we do not suppress the Detroit vote, we're going to have a tough time in this election cycle." The New York Times cited this comment in an editorial on the "suppression of minority votes." Detroit's population is more than 80 percent African American, and tends to vote heavily Democratic.

== 2006 State Senate campaign ==
Pappageorge was persuaded by the Michigan Republican Party to run for the 13th District State Senate seat after Congressman Sander Levin's son, Andy Levin announced he was going to enter the race. After Pappageorge joined the race, Gosselin dropped out in order to run for County Commissioner in Troy. Pappageorge won the August Republican primary 58.5% to Taub's 41.5%.

Charges of mudslinging and dirty politics continued in the general election between Pappageorge and Levin. The race became hotly contested, with over $2 million spent by the two campaigns, and with negative television ads from each side (a rarity in State Senate races in metro-Detroit).

The Michigan Republican Party, on behalf of Pappageorge's campaign, distributed flyers alleging that Levin had stances on issues, including same-sex marriage, illegal immigration and gun control, that were too liberal for the district. They also accused Levin of being a carpetbagger, as Levin had recently moved back to Michigan after working for the AFL-CIO in Washington, D.C. Levin's campaign fired back, claiming that Pappageorge cut more than $500 million from schools in Michigan and was fired from the Bush Presidential campaign in 2004.

Pappageorge defeated Levin in November by a slim margin, 776 votes. Pappageorge's margin of victory was less than the number of votes obtained by Green Party candidate Kyle McBee, who received 3,118 votes.

== 2010 State Senate campaign ==
In the 2010 election, Pappageorge was the only incumbent in Oakland County to seek re-election. He defeated two challengers in the August 3 primary.

In the general election, Pappageorge was challenged by newcomer Aaron Bailey, a West Point graduate and Afghanistan veteran. Days before the election, Bailey received the endorsement of the Detroit Free Press.

On election day, Pappageorge defeated Bailey.
