= Chuck Yob =

American politician

Chuck Yob (born February 14, 1937) is an American politician and former Republican National Committee member from the state of Michigan, having been elected to the post in 1989. He is frequently quoted in the media as an expert on internal Republican politics and is well known for his influence on party convention campaigns. He was a candidate for Congress in Michigan's Upper peninsula in 2000, losing to Democrat Bart Stupak.

Yob's political life started in 1970 as the campaign manager for Harry Gast for State Representative. Since then he has held numerous political offices ranging from Co-Chairman of the Michigan Reagan campaign in 1980 to Co-Chairman of the George W. Bush re-election campaign. Yob has also served as a Director of the Michigan Department of Transportation, Vice Chairman of the Mackinac Island State Park Commission, and Director of the Federal Home Loan Bank Board. In early 2005 he was elected RNC Vice Chairman for the Midwest region.

On September 12, 2007, Yob announced that he would not seek re-election to the Republican National Committee.

Yob and his wife, Jackalyn, have six children and twelve grandchildren, including their son, John Yob, who is the chair of the Republican Party of the Virgin Islands.

== See also ==
- Michigan Republican Party
