= Bart Stupak =

American politician (born 1952)

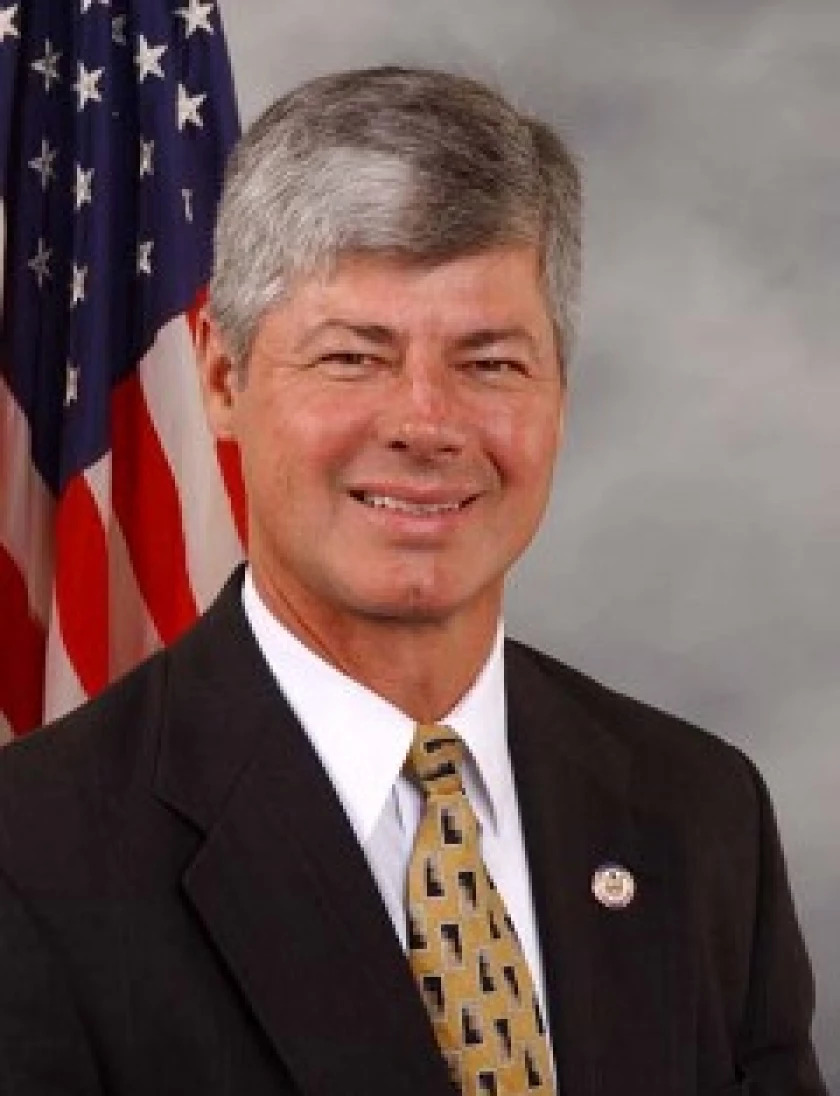

Member of the U.S. House of Representatives from Michigan's 1st district
- In office January 3, 1993 – January 3, 2011
- Preceded by: Bob Davis
- Succeeded by: Dan Benishek

Member of the Michigan House of Representatives from the 109th district
- In office January 11, 1989 – January 9, 1991
- Preceded by: Jim Connors
- Succeeded by: David Anthony

Personal details
- Born: Bartholomew Thomas Stupak; February 29, 1952 (age 74) Milwaukee, Wisconsin, U.S.
- Party: Democratic
- Spouse: Laurie Stupak
- Children: 2
- Education: Northwestern Michigan College; Saginaw Valley State University (BS); Thomas M. Cooley Law School (JD)
- Stupak's voice Stupak supporting legislation to expand the Thunder Bay National Marine Sanctuary. Recorded September 29, 2009

Bartholomew Thomas Stupak (/ˈstuːpæk/; born February 29, 1952) is an American politician and lobbyist. A member of the Democratic Party, Stupak served as the U.S. representative from Michigan's 1st congressional district from 1993 to 2011.

Stupak chose not to seek re-election in 2010. He departed Congress in January 2011, and was succeeded by Dan Benishek, a Republican from the Upper Peninsula. Stupak is now a lobbyist with Venable LLP.

== Early life, education and career ==
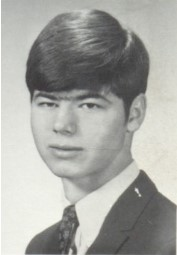
Stupak as a high school senior, 1970

Stupak was born in Milwaukee, Wisconsin, and graduated from Gladstone High School in Gladstone, Michigan in 1970. He is an Eagle Scout. He earned his Associate's degree from Northwestern Michigan College, a community college in Traverse City in 1972. He earned his bachelor's degree in criminal justice from Saginaw Valley State University in 1977, graduating magna cum laude, and he earned a J.D. degree from Thomas M. Cooley Law School in Lansing, Michigan in 1981. He worked as an Escanaba police officer in 1972. Stupak later served as a Michigan State Police Trooper from 1973 to 1984 and as a member of C-Street while in Congress. He also practiced law.

== Michigan legislature ==
In 1988, Stupak was elected a Michigan State Representative, representing Menominee, Delta, and Dickinson counties, defeating two-term Republican Jim Connors. In 1990, Stupak ran for state senator but lost a hotly contested primary to eventual general election winner Don Koivisto.

== U.S. House of Representatives ==
In 1992, Stupak ran for the House of Representatives in the 1st District, covering the Upper Peninsula and the northernmost swath of the Lower Peninsula. The district had previously been the 11th, represented by retiring seven-term incumbent Republican Robert William Davis. Stupak won the heavily contested Democratic primary, and defeated Republican Philip Ruppe, Davis' predecessor, in the general election. He was the first Democrat to represent this district since 1967, and only the third Democrat to win it in the 20th century. He was easily reelected in 1994 during a bad year for Democrats, becoming the first Democrat in 56 years to be elected to more than one term in the Northern Michigan district.

Stupak defeated Republican Don Hooper of Iron River in the 2002, 2004 and 2006 elections, and Republican Tom Casperson in 2008 elections.

On April 9, 2010, Stupak announced that he would not run for re-election, and that he would retire from Congress at the end of his then-current term.

=== Campaign funding ===
Electric utilities and health care professionals were among the top four industries contributing to his campaigns in 2006, 2008 and 2010. Of his top 20 largest contributors throughout his political career, 16 were unions and associations, two were energy companies, one was an insurance company and one was a telecommunications firm.

=== Committee assignments ===
- Committee on Energy and Commerce
  - Subcommittee on Commerce, Trade and Consumer Protection
  - Subcommittee on Communications, Technology and the Internet
  - Subcommittee on Oversight and Investigation (Chair)

=== Caucus memberships ===
- Founder and co-chair of the Law Enforcement Caucus
- Co-chair of the Congressional Northern Border Caucus
- Member, Congressional Motorcycle Safety Caucus

During his service in Congress, Stupak sponsored 36 bills, but none became law. He cosponsored 157 bills, 5 of which were enacted into law. He voted with the members of his party 96% of the time, and abstained from 5% of the votes. Because of the 1st District's extensive length of Great Lakes shoreline (over 1,600 miles), Stupak was very active on issues related to the protection of the Great Lakes, including opposing sale or diversion of Great Lakes water and drilling for oil and gas under the lakes.

== Political positions ==
=== Financial system ===
In 2009, Stupak voted against the Dodd–Frank Wall Street Reform and Consumer Protection Act, which expanded Federal regulation and oversight of the U.S. financial system in the aftermath of the U.S. financial and banking crisis of that year.

=== Social policy ===
Stupak voted for the Local Law Enforcement Hate Crimes Prevention Act of 2009, which expanded the definition of hate crimes to include crimes motivated by sexual orientation or gender identity.

=== Health care ===
Stupak expressed a desire to support the 2009 health care reform bill put forth by President Barack Obama, but wanted restrictions on coverage for abortion. Therefore, Stupak and Republican Congressman Joseph R. Pitts submitted an amendment known as the Stupak–Pitts Amendment to prohibit such payments. The Stupak–Pitts Amendment was adopted by the House of Representatives, but a similar provision was defeated in the Senate version of the legislation (known as the Patient Protection and Affordable Care Act). Stupak announced that he and several other Democratic representatives who supported health reform legislation but opposed abortion would not vote for the final version of the legislation unless the Stupak-Pitts Amendment was included. The ensuing controversy made Stupak "perhaps the single most important rank-and-file House member in passing the bill."

Abortion-rights advocates held a "Stop Stupak" rally on Capitol Hill in December 2009. In the ensuing months, Stupak publicly stated that the pressure and opposition he received in regard to his abortion stance on the health reform legislation had caused him to unplug the phone at his house due to "obscene phone calls and threats" and had made his life a "living hell." "My staff is overwhelmed and we're accosted basically wherever we go by people who disagree," Stupak added.

In March 2010, President Obama and Stupak reached an understanding whereby the President promised to sign an Executive Order barring federal funding of abortion through the Patient Protection and Affordable Care Act, and Stupak and several of his allies promised to withdraw their opposition to the bill. Anti-abortion advocates accused Stupak of betraying their movement, with the Susan B. Anthony List revoking an award it had planned to give to him and instead running $150,000 worth of radio advertisements against him. Stupak was targeted by the Tea Party movement in the wake of his compromise. In April 2010, Stupak announced his intention to retire from Congress, leading conservative groups to point to the political consequences of his compromise as a possible reason for his decision. However, Stupak himself attributed his retirement to the exertion of constant travel back and forth from Washington, D.C.

Stupak also supports a public option and single-payer healthcare.

== Apartment controversy ==
Stupak rented a room at the C Street Center, a Washington, D.C. facility of The Fellowship (also known as The Family), a Christian fraternal organization. The Fellowship has been the subject of controversy over its claimed tax status as a church, the ownership of the property and its connection to the Fellowship, and the reportedly subsidized benefits the facility provides to members of Congress.

Jeff Sharlet, author of a book about The Fellowship, said, "When I lived with The Family at Ivanwald, a house for younger men being groomed for leadership, I was told that Stupak was a regular visitor to the Cedars." The Cedars, according to the Washington Independent, is also owned by The Family and hosts weekly prayer events. Stupak has denied any affiliation with the Family and appeared to deny knowledge of the organization, stating "I don't belong to any such group" and that "I don't know what you're talking about, [The] Family and all this other stuff."

== Electoral history ==
- 1992 Democratic primary for Congress
  - Bart Stupak, 48.63%
  - Mike McElroy, 43.11%
  - Daniel Herringa, 8.27%
- 1992 general election
  - Bart Stupak (D), 53.93%
  - Philip Ruppe (R), 43.58%
  - Gerald Aydlott (L), 1.52%
  - Lyman Clark (NL), 0.96%
- 1994 general election
  - Bart Stupak (D), 56.86%
  - Gil Ziegler (R), 41.99%
  - Michael McPeak (NL), 1.12%
- 1996 general election
  - Bart Stupak (D), 70.68%
  - Bob Carr (R), 27.24%
  - Michael C. Oleniczak (L), 1.10%
  - Wendy Conway (NL), 0.96%
- 1998 general election
  - Bart Stupak (D), 58.67%
  - Michelle McManus (R), 39.51%
  - John W. Loosemore (L), 1.04%
  - Wendy Conway (NL), 0.78%
- 2000 general election
  - Bart Stupak (D), 58.39%
  - Chuck Yob (R), 40.37%
  - Wendy Conway (NL), 0.63%
  - John W. Loosemore (L), 0.61%
  - Sven Johnson (I), 0.01%
- 2002 campaign for Congress
  - Bart Stupak (D), 67.67%
  - Don Hooper (R), 31.10%
  - John W. Loosemore (L), 1.23%
- 2004 general election
  - Bart Stupak (D), 65.57%
  - Don Hooper (R), 32.76%
  - David J. Newland (G), 0.96%
  - John W. Loosemore (L), 0.71%
- 2006 general election
  - Bart Stupak (D), 69.43%
  - Don Hooper (R), 27.99%
  - Joshua J. Warren (Tax.), 0.88%
  - David J. Newland (G), 0.87%
  - Kenneth L. Proctor (L), 0.85%
- 2008 general election
  - Bart Stupak (D), 65.04%
  - Tom Casperson (R), 32.74%
  - Jean Treacy (S/G), 0.81%
  - Dan Grow (L), 0.77%
  - Joshua J. Warren (Tax.), 0.63%

== Personal life ==
Stupak lives in Menominee, Michigan, with his wife, Laurie, who is a former mayor of Menominee, and unsuccessful candidate for the Michigan House of Representatives. Laurie Stupak was defeated by Tom Casperson. In 2008 Casperson unsuccessfully challenged Bart Stupak, the incumbent for Michigan's 1st Congressional district seat in the United States House of Representatives.

The Stupaks' son Ken graduated from Pepperdine University's School of Law in 2006 and resides in California. Their other son, Bart Jr., died by suicide in May 2000. Congressman Stupak testified before the House Energy and Commerce Committee's Oversight and Investigations Subcommittee during a 2002 hearing on the safety of Accutane, an acne medication, which he believes contributed to his son's death.

U.S. House of Representatives
Preceded by John Conyers	Member of the U.S. House of Representatives from Michigan's 1st congressional district 1993–2011	Succeeded by Dan Benishek
U.S. order of precedence (ceremonial)
Preceded by Pete Hoekstra as Former U.S. Representative	Order of precedence of the United States as Former U.S. Representative	Succeeded by Larry Combest as Former U.S. Representative
