= Dale Kildee =

American politician (1929–2021)

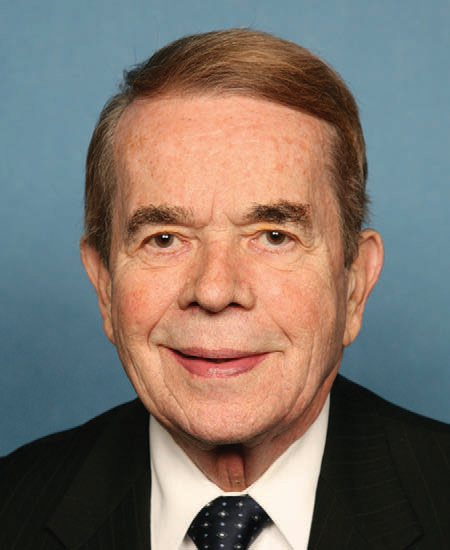

Member of the U.S. House of Representatives from Michigan
- In office January 3, 1977 – January 3, 2013
- Preceded by: Donald Riegle
- Succeeded by: Dan Kildee
- Constituency: 7th district (1977–1993); 9th district (1993–2003); 5th district (2003–2013)

Member of the Michigan Senate from the 29th district
- In office January 1975 – December 1976
- Preceded by: Garland Lane
- Succeeded by: Harold Scott

Member of the Michigan House of Representatives from the 81st district
- In office January 1965 – December 1974
- Preceded by: Constituency established
- Succeeded by: Mark Clodfelter

Personal details
- Born: Dale Edward Kildee; September 16, 1929 Flint, Michigan, U.S.
- Died: October 13, 2021 (aged 92) Arlington, Virginia, U.S.
- Party: Democratic
- Spouse: Gayle Kildee
- Children: 3
- Relatives: Dan Kildee (nephew)
- Education: Sacred Heart Major Seminary (BA); University of Detroit (GrCert); University of Peshawar; University of Michigan (MA)
- Dale Kildee's voice Dale Kildee criticizes spending cuts for public education Recorded June 30, 1995

Dale Edward Kildee (September 16, 1929 – October 13, 2021) was an American politician who served as U.S. Representative of Michigan from 1977 to 2013. He was a member of the Democratic Party.

His district included Flint, Saginaw and Bay City. In July 2011, Kildee announced he would retire after his term was up in 2012. He was succeeded by his nephew Dan Kildee.

== Early life, education, and teaching career ==
Kildee was born in Flint, Michigan on September 16, 1929 to Timothy and Norma (Ullmer) Kildee. He was the fourth of five children. In his senior year of high school, he won the American Legion Medal of Citizenship. In 1947, Kildee received his high school diploma from St. Mary's High School.

He earned his B.A. from Sacred Heart Seminary in Detroit, Michigan in 1952. He earned a teacher's certificate from the University of Detroit in 1955. He did graduate work in history and political science at the University of Peshawar in Pakistan from 1958 to 1959 under a Rotary Foundation Fellowship. He earned an M.A. from the University of Michigan in 1961. He was a teacher at the University of Detroit Jesuit High School and Academy from 1954-56. Coming back in 1956 to Flint, Kildee taught Latin until 1964.

== Michigan legislature ==
Kildee served as a member of the Michigan State House of Representatives 81st district from 1965 to 1974. He then subsequently served as a member of the Michigan State Senate from 1975 to 1976.

== U.S. House of Representatives ==
=== Elections ===
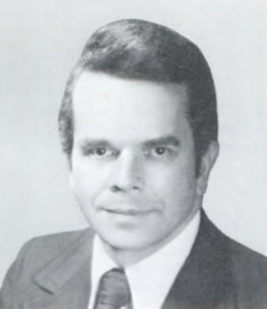
Kildee from the 1977 Congressional Pictorial Directory

In 1976, incumbent Democratic U.S. Representative Donald Riegle resigned after being appointed to fill the vacant seat in the U.S. Senate caused by the death of Philip Hart. State Senator Kildee won the general election with 70% of the vote. He won re-election 17 times, each with at least 56% of the vote except in 1992, 1994, and 2010. In 1992, he defeated Megan O'Neill with 54% of the vote. He won Genesee County with 74%, while he lost the district's other two counties: Oakland and Lapeer. In the 1994 rematch, he defeated her with just 51% of the vote, the lowest winning percentage of his career. In 2010, he defeated Republican farmer and businessman John Kupiec with 53% of the vote. Kupiec won Tuscola County with 60%, while losing the district's other three counties. Kildee won Bay (49%), Saginaw (61%), and Genesee Counties (55%).

=== Tenure ===
In 1997, Kildee founded the House's Native American Caucus to advocate Native American issues. In 2010, Kildee revealed that he would be voting for the Senate version of the Health Care reform bill without the Stupak Amendment language restricting federal abortion funding. In addition, reports surfaced that he attempted to convince anti-abortion Democrats in the Stupak coalition to vote for the bill.

=== Committee assignments ===
He was a senior member of the House Committee on Education and the Workforce and served as ranking Democrat on the Subcommittee on Education Reform and a member of the Subcommittee on Employer-Employee Relations. He was also a member of the House Committee on Resources, where he sat on the Subcommittee on National Parks and Public Lands and the Subcommittee on Forests and Forest Health. From 1993 on, he served as co-chair of the Congressional Automotive Caucus. From 1997 on, he served as co-chair of the Native American Caucus.

== Personal life ==
He met his future wife Gayle, a French teacher, while teaching at Central High School. They married in 1965 and had three children, Paul, Laura, and David. Both sons became army captains; their daughter became a commercial property manager.

In November 2011, Patrick Kildee, a second cousin of the congressman, accused Kildee of sexually abusing him more than 50 years previously when he was 12 years old. In response Kildee called the allegation untrue.

== Death ==
Kildee died on October 13, 2021, in Arlington, Virginia, at the age of 92.

Kildee was a Roman Catholic.

== Electoral history ==
Michigan's 7th congressional district: Results 1976–1990
Year	Democrat	Votes	%	Republican	Votes	%	Third Party	Party	Votes	%	Third Party	Party	Votes	%	Third Party	Party	Votes	%
1976	Dale Kildee	124,260	70%	Robin Widgery	50,301	28%	Jimmy Sabin	American Independent	1,451	1%	Max Duane	U.S. Labor	835	0%	Benjamin Hoffman	Libertarian	735	0%
1978	Dale Kildee	105,402	77%	Gale Cronk	29,958	22%	Jimmy Sabin	American Independent	2,179	2%								
1980	Dale Kildee	147,280	93%	No candidate			James Beaver	Libertarian	11,507	7%								
1982	Dale Kildee	118,538	75%	George Darrah	36,303	23%	Dennis Berry	Libertarian	1,842	1%	David Freund	Workers League	568	0%				
1984	Dale Kildee	145,070	93%	No candidate			Samuel Johnson	Independent	10,663	7%								
1986	Dale Kildee	101,225	80%	Trudie Callihan	24,848	20%	Gene Schenk	Independent	1,099	1%								
1988	Dale Kildee	150,832	76%	Kevin Cook	47,071	24%	Gary Walkowicz	Workers Against Concessions	1,174	1%								
1990	Dale Kildee	90,307	68%	David Morrill	41,759	32%												

Michigan's 9th congressional district: Results 1992–2000
Year	Democrat	Votes	%	Republican	Votes	%	Third Party	Party	Votes	%	Third Party	Party	Votes	%	Third Party	Party	Votes	%
1992	Dale Kildee	133,956	54%	Megan O'Neill	111,798	45%	Key Halverson	Natural Law	1,891	1%	Jerome White	Workers League	1,872	1%				
1994	Dale Kildee	97,096	51%	Megan O'Neill	89,148	47%	Karen Blasdell	Natural Law	3,240	2%								
1996	Dale Kildee	136,856	59%	Patrick Nowak	89,733	39%	Malcolm Johnson	Libertarian	3,472	2%	Terrence Shulman	Natural Law	1,127	0%				
1998	Dale Kildee	105,457	56%	Tom McMillin	79,062	42%	Malcolm Johnson	Libertarian	4,006	2%								
2000	Dale Kildee	158,184	61%	Grant Garrett	92,926	36%	Laurie Martin	Libertarian	5,337	2%	Terry Haines	U.S. Taxpayers	1,657	1%	Alaya Bouché	Natural Law	824	0%

Michigan's 5th congressional district: Results 2002–2010
Year	Democrat	Votes	%	Republican	Votes	%	Third Party	Party	Votes	%	Third Party	Party	Votes	%
2002	Dale Kildee	158,709	92%	No candidate			Clint Foster	Libertarian	9,344	5%	Harley Mikkelson	Green	5,188	3%
2004	Dale Kildee	208,163	67%	Myrah Kirkwood	96,934	31%	Harley Mikkelson	Green	2,468	1%	Clint Foster	Libertarian	2,350	1%
2006	Dale Kildee	176,171	73%	Eric Klammer	60,967	25%	Ken Mathenia	Green	2,294	1%	Steve Samoranski	Libertarian	2,259	1%
2008	Dale Kildee	221,841	70%	Matt Sawicki	85,017	27%	Leonard Schwartz	Libertarian	4,293	1%	Ken Mathenia	Green	4,144	1%
2010	Dale Kildee	107,286	53%	John Kupiec	89,680	44%	J. Matthew de Heus	Green	2,649	1%	Michael Moon	Libertarian	2,648	1%

U.S. House of Representatives
Preceded by Donald Riegle	Member of the U.S. House of Representatives from Michigan's 7th congressional district 1977–1993	Succeeded by Nick Smith
Preceded by Guy Vander Jagt	Member of the U.S. House of Representatives from Michigan's 9th congressional district 1993–2003	Succeeded by Joe Knollenberg
Preceded by James A. Barcia	Member of the U.S. House of Representatives from Michigan's 5th congressional district 2003–2013	Succeeded by Dan Kildee
