= Joe Knollenberg =

American politician (1933–2018)

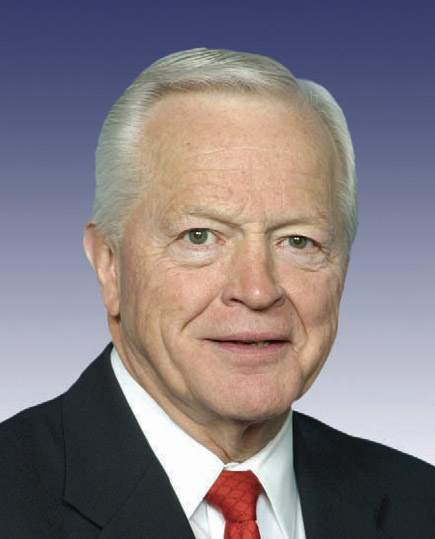

Member of the U.S. House of Representatives from Michigan
- In office January 3, 1993 – January 3, 2009
- Preceded by: William Broomfield
- Succeeded by: Gary Peters
- Constituency: 11th district (1993–2003); 9th district (2003–2009)

Personal details
- Born: Joseph Kastl Knollenberg; November 28, 1933 Mattoon, Illinois, U.S.
- Died: February 6, 2018 (aged 84) Troy, Michigan, U.S.
- Party: Republican
- Spouse: Sandie Knollenberg
- Children: 2, including Marty
- Education: Eastern Illinois University
- Occupation: Insurance agent

Military service
- Branch/service: United States Army
- Years of service: 1955–1957
- Rank: Corporal
- Joe Knollenberg's voice Knollenberg speaks on emergency funding for rebuilding Iraq and Afghanistan; Recorded October 15, 2003

Joseph Kastl Knollenberg (November 28, 1933 – February 6, 2018) was an American politician from Michigan. From 1993 to 2009, he was a Republican member of the U.S. House of Representatives, representing Michigan's 9th congressional district and Michigan's 11th congressional district.

In his congressional term, Knollenberg was known as a staunch supporter of the North American Free Trade Agreement, President George W. Bush's stance on protecting manufactured goods and for voting against expanding SCHIP in the later years of his career.

He was defeated by Gary Peters in the 2008 election by a margin of 52% to 43%.

== Early life ==
Knollenberg was born in Mattoon, Illinois, the son of Helen E. (née Kastl; 1903–1990), a teacher and William Herman Knollenberg Jr. (1902–1975), a farmer. He was raised a Catholic and grew up on a farm along with 12 siblings. He graduated from Eastern Illinois University in 1955, where he was a member of Tau Kappa Epsilon fraternity.

After graduation, he served in the United States Army from 1955 to 1957 as a corporal in Germany, where he specialized in petroleum chemistry. He then spent more than three decades as an insurance agent. Initially working for New York Life Insurance Company as an assistant manager and later for Sears, he founded his own agency, Knollenberg Agency in the late 1980s. He served as chairman of the Oakland County Republican Party from 1978 to 1982.

== Congressional career ==
In 1992, Knollenberg signed on as campaign manager for Congressman William Broomfield, who had represented most of Oakland County in Congress since 1957. However, at a meeting with Knollenberg and other advisers, Broomfield announced he would not run for a 19th term. He then asked Knollenberg to run in his place in the 11th District, which had been renumbered from the 18th District after the 1990 census.

Despite being the only candidate in the three-way Republican primary not holding elected office, Knollenberg won the nomination by over 13 points. As the 11th was one of the most Republican districts in Michigan and the nation at the time, he was virtually assured of becoming only the third person to represent the district. He was reelected six times without serious difficulty, never dropping below 55 percent of the vote.

Knollenberg was re-elected to his seventh term in 2004 with 58% of the vote. In 2006, however, Knollenberg faced a tough campaign against Democrat Nancy Skinner, a liberal talk show host in the Detroit area, ultimately winning by six points. Two years later, in a more difficult election cycle for Republican candidates, Knollenberg lost re-election to former state senator Gary Peters.

Generally, Knollenberg's voting record was conservative. He supported the North American Free Trade Agreement and led the campaign against President George W. Bush's steel tariffs. In 2002 he was awarded the Mkhitar Gosh Medal by the president of Armenia. On September 29, 2008, he voted against the Emergency Economic Stabilization Act of 2008.

=== Committee assignments ===
- Appropriations Committee:
  - Subcommittee on State, Foreign Operations, and Related Programs
  - Subcommittee on Transportation, Housing and Urban Development, and Related Agencies (Ranking Member)

=== 2006 election ===
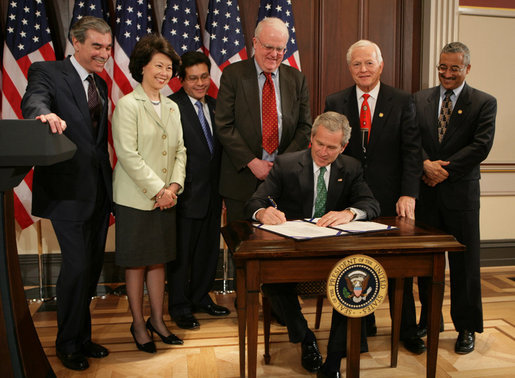
Knollenberg (second to right) witnessing President George W. Bush signing the 'Stop Counterfeiting in Manufactured Goods' Act in 2006

Knollenberg was challenged in the 2006 Republican primary by moderate Republican Patricia Godchaux. Democratic candidate Nancy Skinner, a popular former radio-talk show host in the Detroit area, was her party's nominee for the 9th district. Matthew R. Abel of the Green Party and Adam Goodman of the Libertarian Party were third-party candidates also in the race.

Prior to 2006, Knollenberg's election was widely considered to be relatively easy given the traditionally Republican leanings of Troy, the largest city in his district. The 2000s round of redistricting made Knollenberg's district much friendlier to Democrats. While the district lost heavily Democratic Southfield, it picked up equally Democratic Pontiac and lost a Republican-leaning spur of Wayne County.

In the 2006 election, Knollenberg was nearly defeated, taking only 52 percent of the vote to Skinner's 46 percent. Abel received .9%, and Goodman received 1.3%. This was the closest a Democrat had come to winning the district in 48 years; in 1958 Broomfield only won a second term by 5.5 points.

Knollenberg spent $2.7 million in his campaign.

=== 2008 election ===
In January 2006, Congressman Knollenberg announced his intent to seek re-election in 2008. The narrowness of his 2006 reelection bid, combined with his district's changing demographics led the Democratic Congressional Campaign Committee to target him for defeat. The Democratic Congressional Campaign Committee targeted Congressional Districts where Republicans garnered less than 55% of the vote.

The Democratic nominee was Gary Peters, the former state lottery commissioner. Skinner initially made plans for a rematch, but bowed out to clear the field for Peters. In March 2008, Jack Kevorkian announced that he would challenge Knollenberg as an independent candidate. The Libertarian nominee was Adam Goodman and the Green nominee was Douglas Campbell. Kevorkian, Goodman and Campbell each raised and spent less money than the mandatory reporting threshold.

On November 4, 2008, Knollenberg was defeated, garnering 43 percent of the vote to Peters' 52 percent. Knollenberg's candidacy was likely hurt by a heavy Democratic tide in the Detroit area; Barack Obama carried Oakland County by a 15-point margin, six percentage points more than Peters' margin over Knollenberg. A potential factor in Knollenberg's defeat was a series of advertisements criticizing his vote against expanding SCHIP.

== Personal life and death ==
Knollenberg had two sons, Stephen and Martin with his wife, Sandra "Sandie" Moco, whom he married in September 1962 at St Frances Cabrini Church in Allen Park, Michigan. His son, Martin, was elected in November 2006 by a 58%-42% margin to the Michigan State House of Representatives from the 41st District.

Knollenberg died on February 6, 2018, due to complications from Alzheimer's disease at a care facility in Troy, Michigan at the age of 84.

U.S. House of Representatives
Preceded by Robert W. Davis	Member of the U.S. House of Representatives from Michigan's 11th congressional district 1993–2003	Succeeded by Thaddeus McCotter
Preceded by Dale Kildee	Member of the U.S. House of Representatives from Michigan's 9th congressional district 2003–2009	Succeeded by Gary Peters
