= Nick Smith (American politician) =

American politician (born 1934)

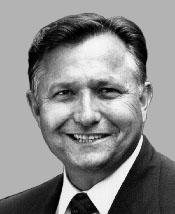

Member of the U.S. House of Representatives from Michigan's 7th district
- In office January 3, 1993 – January 3, 2005
- Preceded by: Dale Kildee
- Succeeded by: Joe Schwarz

Member of the Michigan Senate from the 19th district
- In office January 1, 1983 – December 31, 1992
- Preceded by: John Mowat
- Succeeded by: Philip E. Hoffman

Member of the Michigan House of Representatives from the 41st district
- In office January 1, 1979 – December 31, 1982
- Preceded by: Paul Porter
- Succeeded by: Michael E. Nye

Personal details
- Born: Nicholas Hart Smith; November 5, 1934 (age 91) Addison, Michigan, U.S.
- Party: Republican
- Education: Michigan State University (BA); University of Delaware (MS)

Nicholas Hart Smith (born November 5, 1934) is a retired American politician from the U.S. state of Michigan, who served as a Republican member of the United States House of Representatives from 1993 until 2005, representing the 7th District of Michigan.

== Life and career ==
Smith was born in Addison, Michigan, where he still lives. He earned a B.A. from Michigan State University in East Lansing, Michigan, in 1957 and an M.S. in economics from the University of Delaware in 1959. Smith served in the United States Air Force from 1959 to 1961 where he became a captain. He was squadron commander in the Civil Air Patrol and later an intelligence officer. He operates a dairy farm in Addison.

Smith served on the Somerset Township board of trustees, 1962 to 1968. He was township supervisor and on the Hillsdale County board of supervisors from 1966 to 1968. He then served as assistant deputy administrator and director of energy in the United States Department of Agriculture between 1972 and 1974.

Smith served as a member of the Michigan State House of Representatives from the 41st District from 1979 to 1983. He then served as a member of Michigan Senate from the 19th District from 1983 to 1993. While in the Michigan Senate, he was appointed President Pro Tempore from 1983 to 1990.

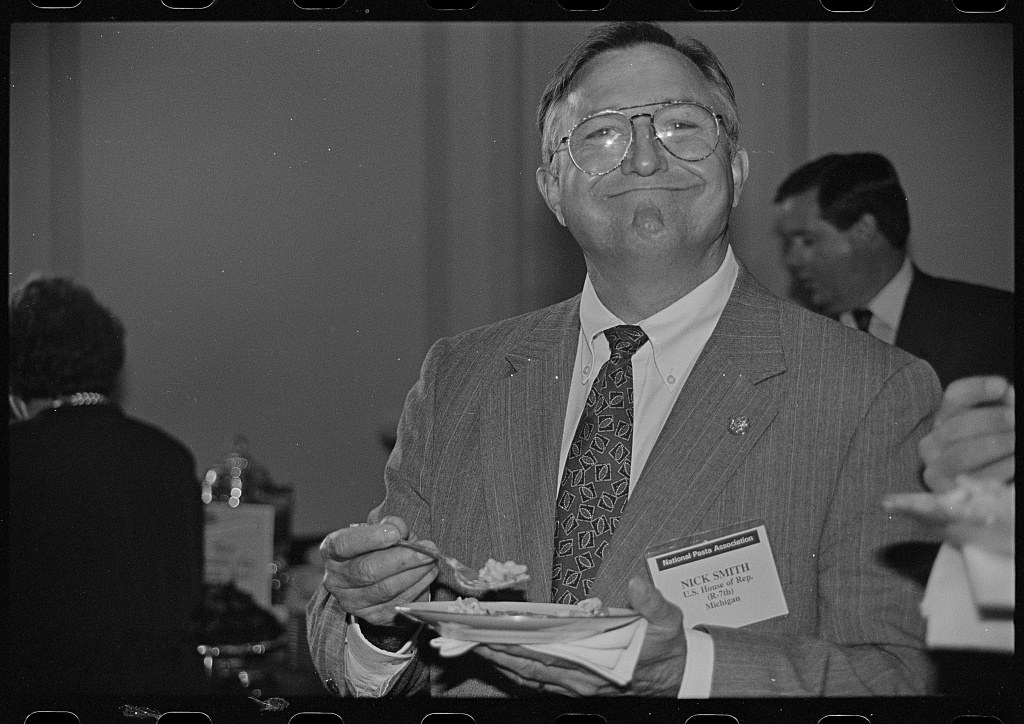
Smith at a congressional event in 1993

Smith ran for Congress in the 7th District in 1992, winning the Republican primary by seven points. His nearest opponent was fellow state senator Joe Schwarz, a considerably more moderate Republican. Smith was the major candidate from the eastern portion of the district, while Schwarz and the others were all from the western portion. The candidates from the western portion split the vote, allowing Smith to win despite getting only 37 percent of the vote. No Democrat even filed for the general election, handing the seat to Smith. He was reelected five times.

Smith was a relatively low-profile congressman for most of his career, compiling a reliably conservative voting record despite representing a fairly marginal district. However, Smith gained national attention in 2004 in the controversy over the Medicare Modernization Act. Smith had announced earlier he was not running for reelection later that year, having promised during his initial run to only serve six terms (12 years) in the House. However, he'd endorsed his son, Brad, as his successor. Smith stated that members of the House Republican leadership told him that if he voted for the Medicare bill, business interests would give $100,000 to his son's campaign. When Nick Smith refused to vote for the bill, he was told that his son would never get into Congress. Ultimately, Brad Smith was defeated in the Republican primary by Schwarz, who was elected in November.

In March 2004, the House Ethics Committee admonished fellow Representative from Michigan Candice Miller and House Majority Leader Tom DeLay for their involvement in the affair.

== See also ==
- Matt Latimer, former Congressional staffer for Smith

U.S. House of Representatives
Preceded by Dale Kildee	Member of the U.S. House of Representatives from Michigan's 7th congressional district 1993–2005	Succeeded by Joe Schwarz
U.S. order of precedence (ceremonial)
Preceded by Dennis Hertel as Former U.S. Representative	Order of precedence of the United States as Former U.S. Representative	Succeeded by Candice Miller as Former U.S. Representative
