= List of United States representatives from Michigan =

The following is an alphabetical list of United States representatives from the state of Michigan. For chronological tables of members of both houses of the United States Congress from the state (through the present day), see Michigan's congressional delegations.

== Current members ==
As of January 3, 2025

- 1st district: Jack Bergman (R) (since 2017)
- 2nd district: John Moolenaar (R) (since 2015)
- 3rd district: Hillary Scholten (D) (since 2023)
- 4th district: Bill Huizenga (R) (since 2011)
- 5th district: Tim Walberg (R) (since 2011)
- 6th district: Debbie Dingell (D) (since 2015)
- 7th district: Tom Barrett (R) (since 2025)
- 8th district: Kristen McDonald Rivet (D) (since 2025)
- 9th district: Lisa McClain (R) (since 2021)
- 10th district: John James (R) (since 2023)
- 11th district: Haley Stevens (D) (since 2019)
- 12th district: Rashida Tlaib (D) (since 2019)
- 13th district: Shri Thanedar (D) (since 2023)

== List of members ==
Representative	Years	Party	District	Notes
David D. Aitken	March 4, 1893 – March 4, 1897	Republican	6th	Elected in 1892. Retired to run for Governor of Michigan.
Donald J. Albosta	January 3, 1979 – January 3, 1985	Democratic	10th	Elected in 1978. Lost re-election to Schuette.
Edward P. Allen	March 4, 1887 – March 4, 1891	Republican	2nd	Elected in 1886. Lost re-election to Gorman.
Justin Amash	January 3, 2011 – July 4, 2019	Republican	3rd	Elected in 2010. Switched parties.
Justin Amash	July 4, 2019 – May 1, 2020	Independent	3rd	Left the Republican Party. Switched parties.
Justin Amash	May 1, 2020 – January 3, 2021	Libertarian	3rd	Joined the Libertarian Party. Retired.
Henry H. Aplin	October 15, 1901 – March 4, 1903	Republican	10th	Elected to finish Crump's term. Lost renomination to Loud.
John Avery	March 4, 1893 – March 4, 1897	Republican	11th	Elected in 1892. Retired.
Mark R. Bacon	March 4, 1917 – December 13, 1917	Republican	2nd	Elected in 1916. Lost election contest. (Note: In the election of November 7, 1916, official returns showed Mark R. Bacon had won by 49 votes. Although there was no provision in state law at that time for recounting ballots in the election of federal officials, a separate examination of votes in Jackson County revealed that Samuel W. Beakes was entitled to 87 more votes. However, the board of state canvassers and the Michigan Supreme Court refused to allow a recount. Finally, the U.S. House Committee on Elections decided to conduct a recount, which gave Beakes the victory by 132 votes. The committee unanimously reported resolutions to the full House stating that Bacon had not been elected to the seat and was not entitled to it, and that, in fact, Beakes was the elected representative of the district. The House seated Beakes on December 13, 1917.)
Augustus C. Baldwin	March 4, 1863 – March 4, 1865	Democratic	5th	Elected in 1862. Lost re-election to Trowbridge.
James A. Barcia	January 3, 1993 – January 3, 2003	Democratic	5th	Elected in 1992. Retired to run for state senator.
Tom Barrett	January 3, 2025 – present	Republican	7th	Elected in 2024. Incumbent.
Samuel Beakes	March 4, 1913 – March 4, 1917	Democratic	2nd	Elected in 1912. Lost re-election to Bacon.
Samuel Beakes	December 13, 1917 – March 4, 1919	Democratic	2nd	Won election contest. Lost re-election to Michener.
Fernando C. Beaman	March 4, 1861 – March 4, 1863	Republican	2nd	Elected in 1860. Redistricted to the 1st district.
Fernando C. Beaman	March 4, 1863 – March 4, 1871	Republican	1st	Redistricted from the 2nd district and re-elected in 1862. Retired.
Josiah Begole	March 4, 1873 – March 4, 1875	Republican	6th	Elected in 1872. Lost re-election to Durand.
Charles E. Belknap	March 4, 1889 – March 4, 1891	Republican	5th	Elected in 1888. Retired.
Charles E. Belknap	November 3, 1891 – March 4, 1893	Republican	5th	Elected to finish M. Ford's term. Lost re-election to Richardson.
Dan Benishek	January 3, 2011 – January 3, 2017	Republican	1st	Elected in 2010. Retired.
John B. Bennett	January 3, 1943 – January 3, 1945	Republican	12th	Elected in 1942. Lost re-election to Hook.
John B. Bennett	January 3, 1947 – August 9, 1964	Republican	12th	Elected in 1946. Died.
Alvin Morell Bentley	January 3, 1953 – January 3, 1961	Republican	8th	Elected in 1952. Retired to run for U.S. Senator.
Kerry Bentivolio	January 3, 2013 – January 3, 2015	Republican	11th	Elected in 2012. Lost renomination to Trott.
Jack Bergman	January 3, 2017 – present	Republican	1st	Elected in 2016. Incumbent.
Kinsley S. Bingham	March 4, 1847 – March 4, 1851	Democratic	3rd	Elected in 1846. Retired.
Mike Bishop	January 3, 2015 – January 3, 2019	Republican	8th	Elected in 2014. Lost re-election to Slotkin.
Roswell P. Bishop	March 4, 1895 – March 4, 1907	Republican	9th	Elected in 1894. Lost renomination to McLaughlin.
William W. Blackney	January 3, 1935 – January 3, 1937	Republican	6th	Elected in 1934. Lost re-election to Transue.
William W. Blackney	January 3, 1939 – January 3, 1953	Republican	6th	Elected in 1938. Retired.
Austin Blair	March 4, 1867 – March 4, 1873	Republican	3rd	Elected in 1866. Retired to run for Governor of Michigan.
James Blanchard	January 3, 1975 – January 1, 1983	Democratic	18th	Elected in 1974. Retired to run for Governor of Michigan and resigned to take office.
Aaron T. Bliss	March 4, 1889 – March 4, 1891	Republican	8th	Elected in 1888. Lost re-election to Youmans.
Frank P. Bohn	March 4, 1927 – March 4, 1933	Republican	11th	Elected in 1926. Lost re-election to P. Brown.
David E. Bonior	January 3, 1977 – January 3, 1993	Democratic	12th	Elected in 1976. Redistricted to the 10th district.
David E. Bonior	January 3, 1993 – January 3, 2003	Democratic	10th	Redistricted from the 12th district and re-elected in 1992. Retired.
Edward Bradley	March 4, 1847 – August 5, 1847	Democratic	2nd	Elected in 1846. Died.
Frederick Van Ness Bradley	January 3, 1939 – May 24, 1947	Republican	11th	Elected in 1938. Died.
Nathan B. Bradley	March 4, 1873 – March 4, 1877	Republican	8th	Elected in 1872. Retired.
Edward Breitung	March 4, 1883 – March 4, 1885	Republican	11th	Elected in 1882. Retired.
Vincent M. Brennan	March 4, 1921 – March 4, 1923	Republican	13th	Elected in 1920. Retired.
Mark S. Brewer	March 4, 1877 – March 4, 1881	Republican	6th	Elected in 1876. Retired.
Mark S. Brewer	March 4, 1887 – March 4, 1891	Republican	6th	Elected in 1886. Retired.
William M. Brodhead	January 3, 1975 – January 3, 1983	Democratic	17th	Elected in 1974. Retired.
William Broomfield	January 3, 1957 – January 3, 1973	Republican	18th	Elected in 1956. Redistricted to the 19th district.
William Broomfield	January 3, 1973 – January 3, 1983	Republican	19th	Redistricted from the 18th district and re-elected in 1972. Redistricted to the 18th district.
William Broomfield	January 3, 1983 – January 3, 1993	Republican	18th	Redistricted from the 19th district and re-elected in 1982. Retired.
Garry E. Brown	January 3, 1967 – January 3, 1979	Republican	3rd	Elected in 1966. Lost re-election to Wolpe.
Prentiss M. Brown	March 4, 1933 – November 18, 1936	Democratic	11th	Elected in 1932. Retired to run for U.S. Senator and resigned following early appointment.
Ferdinand Brucker	March 4, 1897 – March 4, 1899	Democratic	8th	Elected in 1896. Lost re-election to Fordney.
Alexander W. Buel	March 4, 1849 – March 4, 1851	Democratic	1st	Elected in 1848. Lost re-election to Penniman.
Julius C. Burrows	March 4, 1873 – March 4, 1875	Republican	4th	Elected in 1872. Lost re-election to A. Potter.
Julius C. Burrows	March 4, 1879 – March 4, 1883	Republican	4th	Elected in 1878. Lost re-election to Yaple.
Julius C. Burrows	March 4, 1885 – March 4, 1893	Republican	4th	Elected in 1884. Redistricted to the 3rd district.
Julius C. Burrows	March 4, 1893 – January 23, 1895	Republican	3rd	Redistricted from the 4th district and re-elected in 1892. Resigned when elected U.S. Senator.
Claude E. Cady	March 4, 1933 – January 3, 1935	Democratic	6th	Elected in 1932. Lost re-election to Blackney.
Dave Camp	January 3, 1991 – January 3, 1993	Republican	10th	Elected in 1990. Redistricted to the 4th district.
Dave Camp	January 3, 1993 – January 3, 2015	Republican	4th	Redistricted from the 10th district and re-elected in 1992. Retired.
Ezra C. Carleton	March 4, 1883 – March 4, 1887	Democratic	7th	Elected in 1882. Retired.
Milton Robert Carr	January 3, 1975 – January 3, 1981	Democratic	6th	Elected in 1974. Lost re-election to Dunn.
Milton Robert Carr	January 3, 1983 – January 3, 1993	Democratic	6th	Elected in 1982. Redistricted to the 8th district.
Milton Robert Carr	January 3, 1993 – January 3, 1995	Democratic	8th	Redistricted from the 6th district and re-elected in 1992. Retired to run for U.S. Senator.
Elford Albin Cederberg	January 3, 1953 – December 31, 1978	Republican	10th	Elected in 1952. Lost re-election to Albosta and resigned early.
Charles E. Chamberlain	January 3, 1957 – December 31, 1974	Republican	6th	Elected in 1956. Retired and resigned early.
John Logan Chipman	March 4, 1887 – August 17, 1893	Democratic	1st	Elected in 1886. Died.
John Smith Chipman	March 4, 1845 – March 4, 1847	Democratic	2nd	Elected in 1844. Retired.
Dick Chrysler	January 3, 1995 – January 3, 1997	Republican	8th	Elected in 1994. Lost re-election to Stabenow.
Robert H. Clancy	March 4, 1923 – March 4, 1925	Democratic	1st	Elected in 1922. Lost re-election to Sosnowski.
Robert H. Clancy	March 4, 1927 – March 4, 1933	Republican	1st	Elected in 1926. Redistricted to the 14th district and lost re-election to Weideman.
Kit Clardy	January 3, 1953 – January 3, 1955	Republican	6th	Elected in 1952. Lost re-election to Hayworth.
Hansen Clarke	January 3, 2011 – January 3, 2013	Democratic	13th	Elected in 2010. Redistricted to the 14th district and lost renomination to Peters.
Samuel Clark	March 4, 1853 – March 4, 1855	Democratic	3rd	Elected in 1852. Lost re-election to Walbridge.
Raymond F. Clevenger	January 3, 1965 – January 3, 1967	Democratic	11th	Elected in 1964. Lost re-election to Ruppe.
George P. Codd	March 4, 1921 – March 4, 1923	Republican	1st	Elected in 1920. Retired.
Howard A. Coffin	January 3, 1947 – January 3, 1949	Republican	13th	Elected in 1946. Lost re-election to O'Brien.
Barbara-Rose Collins	January 3, 1991 – January 3, 1993	Democratic	13th	Elected in 1990. Redistricted to the 15th district.
Barbara-Rose Collins	January 3, 1993 – January 3, 1997	Democratic	15th	Redistricted from the 13th district and re-elected in 1992. Lost renomination to Kilpatrick.
Charles C. Comstock	March 4, 1885 – March 4, 1887	Democratic	5th	Elected in 1884. Retired.
James L. Conger	March 4, 1851 – March 4, 1853	Whig	3rd	Elected in 1850. Retired.
Omar D. Conger	March 4, 1869 – March 4, 1873	Republican	5th	Elected in 1868. Redistricted to the 7th district.
Omar D. Conger	March 4, 1873 – March 3, 1881	Republican	7th	Redistricted from the 5th district and re-elected in 1872. Re-elected but resigned when elected U.S. Senator.
John Conyers	January 3, 1965 – January 3, 1993	Democratic	1st	Elected in 1964. Redistricted to the 14th district.
John Conyers	January 3, 1993 – January 3, 2013	Democratic	14th	Redistricted from the 1st district and re-elected in 1992. Redistricted to the 13th district.
John Conyers	January 3, 2013 – December 5, 2017	Democratic	13th	Redistricted from the 14th district and re-elected in 2012. Resigned.
George B. Cooper	March 4, 1859 – May 15, 1860	Democratic	1st	Elected in 1858. Lost election contest to W. Howard.
John Blaisdell Corliss	March 4, 1895 – March 4, 1903	Republican	1st	Elected in 1894. Lost re-election to Lucking.
Louis C. Cramton	March 4, 1913 – March 4, 1931	Republican	7th	Elected in 1912. Lost renomination to Wolcott.
Isaac E. Crary	January 26, 1837 – March 4, 1841	Democratic	At-large	Elected in 1835. Retired.
Fred L. Crawford	January 3, 1935 – January 3, 1953	Republican	8th	Elected in 1934. Lost renomination to Bentley.
George W. Crockett	November 4, 1980 – January 3, 1991	Democratic	13th	Elected to finish Diggs's term. Retired.
Rousseau Owen Crump	March 4, 1895 – May 1, 1901	Republican	10th	Elected in 1894. Died.
Gilbert A. Currie	March 4, 1917 – March 4, 1921	Republican	10th	Elected in 1916. Lost renomination to Woodruff.
David Curson	November 13, 2012 – January 3, 2013	Democratic	11th	Elected to finish McCotter's term. Retired.
Byron M. Cutcheon	March 4, 1883 – March 4, 1891	Republican	9th	Elected in 1882. Lost re-election to H. Wheeler.
Archibald B. Darragh	March 4, 1901 – March 4, 1909	Republican	11th	Elected in 1900. Retired.
Robert William Davis	January 3, 1979 – January 3, 1993	Republican	11th	Elected in 1978. Retired.
Edwin C. Denby	March 4, 1905 – March 4, 1911	Republican	1st	Elected in 1904. Lost re-election to Doremus.
Gerrit J. Diekema	March 17, 1908 – March 4, 1911	Republican	5th	Elected to finish Smith's term. Lost re-election to Sweet.
Charles Diggs	January 3, 1955 – June 3, 1980	Republican	13th	Elected in 1954. Resigned.
Debbie Dingell	January 3, 2015 – January 3, 2023	Democratic	12th	Elected in 2014. Redistricted to the 6th district.
Debbie Dingell	January 3, 2023 – present	Democratic	6th	Redistricted from the 12th district and re-elected in 2022. Incumbent.
John Dingell	December 13, 1955 – January 3, 1965	Democratic	15th	Elected to finish his father's term. Redistricted to the 16th district.
John Dingell	January 3, 1965 – January 3, 2003	Democratic	16th	Redistricted from the 15th district and re-elected in 1964. Redistricted to the 15th district.
John Dingell	January 3, 2003 – January 3, 2013	Democratic	15th	Redistricted from the 16th district and re-elected in 2002. Redistricted to the 12th district.
John Dingell	January 3, 2013 – January 3, 2015	Democratic	12th	Redistricted from the 15th district and re-elected in 2012. Retired.
John Dingell Sr.	March 4, 1933 – September 19, 1955	Democratic	15th	Elected in 1932. Died.
Francis H. Dodds	March 4, 1909 – March 4, 1913	Republican	11th	Elected in 1908. Lost renomination to Lindquist.
George Anthony Dondero	March 4, 1933 – January 3, 1953	Republican	17th	Elected in 1932. Redistricted to the 18th district.
George Anthony Dondero	January 3, 1953 – January 3, 1957	Republican	18th	Redistricted from the 17th district and re-elected in 1952. Retired.
Frank E. Doremus	March 4, 1911 – March 4, 1921	Democratic	1st	Elected in 1910. Retired.
John F. Driggs	March 4, 1863 – March 4, 1869	Republican	6th	Elected in 1862. Retired.
James Whitney Dunn	January 3, 1981 – January 3, 1983	Republican	6th	Elected in 1980. Lost re-election to Carr.
George H. Durand	March 4, 1875 – March 4, 1877	Democratic	6th	Elected in 1874. Lost re-election to Brewer.
Vern Ehlers	December 7, 1993 – January 3, 2011	Republican	3rd	Elected to finish P. Henry's term. Retired.
Nathaniel B. Eldredge	March 4, 1883 – March 4, 1887	Democratic	2nd	Elected in 1882. Retired.
Charles C. Ellsworth	March 4, 1877 – March 4, 1879	Republican	8th	Elected in 1876. Retired.
Albert J. Engel	January 3, 1935 – January 3, 1951	Republican	9th	Elected in 1934. Retired to run for Governor of Michigan.
Marvin L. Esch	January 3, 1967 – January 3, 1977	Republican	2nd	Elected in 1966. Retired to run for U.S. Senator.
Billie S. Farnum	January 3, 1965 – January 3, 1967	Democratic	19th	Elected in 1964. Lost re-election to McDonald.
Thomas W. Ferry	March 4, 1865 – March 4, 1871	Republican	4th	Elected in 1864. Re-elected but declined the seat when elected U.S. Senator.
Moses W. Field	March 4, 1873 – March 4, 1875	Republican	1st	Elected in 1872. Lost re-election to A. S. Williams.
Spencer O. Fisher	March 4, 1885 – March 4, 1889	Democratic	10th	Elected in 1884. Lost re-election to F. Wheeler.
Gerald Ford	January 3, 1949 – December 6, 1973	Republican	5th	Elected in 1948. Resigned to become U.S. Vice President.
Melbourne H. Ford	March 4, 1887 – March 4, 1889	Democratic	5th	Elected in 1886. Lost re-election to Belknap.
Melbourne H. Ford	March 4, 1891 – April 20, 1891	Democratic	5th	Elected in 1890. Died.
William D. Ford	January 3, 1965 – January 3, 1993	Democratic	15th	Elected in 1964. Redistricted to the 13th district.
William D. Ford	January 3, 1993 – January 3, 1995	Democratic	13th	Redistricted from the 15th district and re-elected in 1992. Retired.
Joseph W. Fordney	March 4, 1899 – March 4, 1923	Republican	8th	Elected in 1898. Retired.
Wilder D. Foster	December 4, 1871 – March 4, 1873	Republican	4th	Elected to finish Ferry's term. Redistricted to the 5th district.
Wilder D. Foster	March 4, 1873 – September 20, 1873	Republican	5th	Redistricted from the 4th district and re-elected in 1872. Died.
George Ernest Foulkes	March 4, 1933 – January 3, 1935	Democratic	4th	Elected in 1932. Lost re-election to Hoffman.
William H. Frankhauser	March 4, 1921 – May 9, 1921	Republican	3rd	Elected in 1920. Died.
Washington Gardner	March 4, 1899 – March 4, 1911	Republican	3rd	Elected in 1898. Lost renomination to J. Smith.
James S. Gorman	March 4, 1891 – March 4, 1895	Democratic	2nd	Elected in 1890. Retired.
Bradley F. Granger	March 4, 1861 – March 4, 1863	Republican	1st	Elected in 1860. Redistricted to the 3rd district and lost re-election to Longyear as a Democrat.
Levi T. Griffin	December 4, 1893 – March 4, 1895	Democratic	1st	Elected to finish Chipman's term. Lost re-election to Corliss.
Robert P. Griffin	January 3, 1957 – May 11, 1966	Republican	9th	Elected in 1956. Resigned when appointed U.S. Senator.
Martha Griffiths	January 3, 1955 – December 31, 1974	Democratic	17th	Elected in 1954. Retired and resigned early.
Edward L. Hamilton	March 4, 1897 – March 4, 1921	Republican	4th	Elected in 1896. Retired.
Michael J. Hart	November 3, 1931 – January 3, 1935	Democratic	8th	Elected to finish Vincent's term. Lost re-election to Crawford.
R. James Harvey	January 3, 1961 – January 31, 1974	Republican	8th	Elected in 1960. Resigned to become judge of the Eastern District of Michigan.
Herschel H. Hatch	March 4, 1883 – March 4, 1885	Republican	10th	Elected in 1882. Retired.
Donald Hayworth	January 3, 1955 – January 3, 1957	Democratic	6th	Elected in 1954. Lost re-election to Chamberlain.
Paul B. Henry	January 3, 1985 – January 3, 1993	Republican	5th	Elected in 1984. Redistricted to the 3rd district.
Paul B. Henry	January 3, 1993 – July 31, 1993	Republican	3rd	Redistricted from the 5th district and re-elected in 1992. Died.
Dennis M. Hertel	January 3, 1981 – January 3, 1993	Democratic	14th	Elected in 1980. Retired.
Pete Hoekstra	January 3, 1993 – January 3, 2011	Republican	2nd	Elected in 1992. Retired to run for Governor of Michigan.
Clare Hoffman	January 3, 1935 – January 3, 1963	Republican	4th	Elected in 1934. Retired.
Frank Eugene Hook	January 3, 1935 – January 3, 1943	Democratic	12th	Elected in 1934. Lost re-election to Bennett.
Frank Eugene Hook	January 3, 1945 – January 3, 1947	Democratic	12th	Elected in 1944. Lost re-election to Bennett.
Joseph L. Hooper	August 18, 1925 – February 22, 1934	Republican	3rd	Elected to finish A. Williams's term. Died.
Roswell G. Horr	March 4, 1879 – March 4, 1885	Republican	8th	Elected in 1878. Lost re-election to Tarsney.
Julius Houseman	March 4, 1883 – March 4, 1885	Democratic	5th	Elected in 1882. Retired.
Jacob M. Howard	March 4, 1841 – March 4, 1843	Whig	At-large	Elected in 1840. Redistricted to the 1st district and lost re-election to McClelland.
William Alanson Howard	March 4, 1855 – March 4, 1859	Republican	1st	Elected in 1854.
William Alanson Howard	March 4, 1855 – March 4, 1859	Republican	1st	Re-elected in 1856. Lost re-election to Cooper.
William Alanson Howard	May 15, 1860 – March 4, 1861	Republican	1st	Won election contest. Retired.
Jay Abel Hubbell	March 4, 1873 – March 4, 1883	Republican	9th	Elected in 1872. Retired.
Robert J. Huber	January 3, 1973 – January 3, 1975	Republican	18th	Elected in 1972. Lost re-election to Blanchard.
Grant M. Hudson	March 4, 1923 – March 4, 1931	Republican	6th	Elected in 1922. Lost renomination to Person.
Bill Huizenga	January 3, 2011 – January 3, 2023	Republican	2nd	Elected in 2010. Redistricted to the 4th district.
Bill Huizenga	January 3, 2023 – present	Republican	4th	Redistricted from the 2nd district and re-elected in 2022. Incumbent.
James B. Hunt	March 4, 1843 – March 4, 1847	Democratic	3rd	Elected in 1843. Retired.
J. Edward Hutchinson	January 3, 1963 – January 3, 1977	Republican	4th	Elected in 1962. Retired.
John James	January 3, 2023 – present	Republican	10th	Elected in 2022. Incumbent.
W. Frank James	March 4, 1915 – January 3, 1935	Republican	12th	Elected in 1914. Lost re-election to Hook.
August E. Johansen	January 3, 1955 – January 3, 1965	Republican	3rd	Elected in 1954. Lost re-election to Todd Jr.
Brenda Jones	November 29, 2018 – January 3, 2019	Democratic	13th	Elected to finish Conyers's term. Lost nomination to the next term to Tlaib.
Bartel J. Jonkman	February 19, 1940 – January 3, 1949	Republican	5th	Elected to finish Mapes's term. Lost renomination to Ford.
Edwin W. Keightley	March 4, 1877 – March 4, 1879	Republican	4th	Elected in 1876. Retired.
Patrick H. Kelley	March 4, 1913 – March 4, 1915	Republican	At-large	Elected in 1912. Redistricted to the 6th district.
Patrick H. Kelley	March 4, 1915 – March 4, 1923	Republican	6th	Redistricted from the at-large district and re-elected in 1914. Retired to run for U.S. senator.
Francis William Kellogg	March 4, 1859 – March 4, 1863	Republican	3rd	Elected in 1858. Redistricted to the 4th district.
Francis William Kellogg	March 4, 1863 – March 4, 1865	Republican	4th	Redistricted from the 3rd district and re-elected in 1862. Retired.
John C. Ketcham	March 4, 1921 – March 4, 1933	Republican	4th	Elected in 1920. Lost re-election to Foulkes.
Dale E. Kildee	January 3, 1977 – January 3, 1993	Democratic	7th	Elected in 1976. Redistricted to the 9th district.
Dale E. Kildee	January 3, 1993 – January 3, 2003	Democratic	9th	Redistricted from the 7th district and re-elected in 1992. Redistricted to the 5th district.
Dale E. Kildee	January 3, 2003 – January 3, 2013	Democratic	5th	Redistricted from the 9th district and re-elected in 2002. Retired.
Dan Kildee	January 3, 2013 – January 3, 2023	Democratic	5th	Elected in 2012. Redistricted to the 8th district.
Dan Kildee	January 3, 2023 – January 3, 2025	Democratic	8th	Redistricted from the 5th district and re-elected in 2022. Retired.
Carolyn Cheeks Kilpatrick	January 3, 1997 – January 3, 2003	Democratic	15th	Elected in 1996. Redistricted to the 13th district.
Carolyn Cheeks Kilpatrick	January 3, 2003 – January 3, 2011	Democratic	13th	Redistricted from the 15th district and re-elected in 2002. Lost renomination to Clarke.
Henry M. Kimball	January 3, 1935 – October 19, 1935	Republican	3rd	Elected in 1934. Died.
Joe Knollenberg	January 3, 1993 – January 3, 2003	Republican	11th	Elected in 1992. Redistricted to the 9th district.
Joe Knollenberg	January 3, 2003 – January 3, 2009	Republican	9th	Redistricted from the 11th district and re-elected in 2002. Lost re-election to Peters.
Victor A. Knox	January 3, 1953 – January 3, 1965	Republican	11th	Elected in 1952. Lost re-election to Clevenger.
Edward S. Lacey	March 4, 1881 – March 4, 1885	Republican	3rd	Elected in 1880. Retired.
Brenda Lawrence	January 3, 2015 – January 3, 2023	Democratic	14th	Elected in 2014. Retired.
Dewitt C. Leach	March 4, 1857 – March 4, 1861	Republican	4th	Elected in 1856. Retired.
John C. Lehr	March 4, 1933 – January 3, 1935	Democratic	2nd	Elected in 1932. Lost re-election to Michener.
John Lesinski Jr.	January 3, 1951 – January 3, 1965	Democratic	16th	Elected in 1950. Lost renomination to Dingell Jr.
John Lesinski Sr.	March 4, 1933 – May 27, 1950	Democratic	16th	Elected in 1932. Died.
Andy Levin	January 3, 2019 – January 3, 2023	Democratic	9th	Elected in 2018. Redistricted to the 11th district and lost renomination to Haley Stevens.
Sander M. Levin	January 3, 1983 – January 3, 1993	Democratic	17th	Elected in 1982. Redistricted to the 12th district.
Sander M. Levin	January 3, 1993 – January 3, 2013	Democratic	12th	Redistricted from the 17th district and re-elected in 1992. Redistricted to the 9th district.
Sander M. Levin	January 3, 2013 – January 3, 2019	Democratic	9th	Redistricted from the 12th district and re-elected in 2012. Retired.
Francis O. Lindquist	March 4, 1913 – March 4, 1915	Republican	11th	Elected in 1912. Retired.
William S. Linton	March 4, 1893 – March 4, 1897	Republican	8th	Elected in 1892. Lost re-election to Brucker.
John W. Longyear	March 4, 1863 – March 4, 1867	Republican	3rd	Elected in 1862. Retired.
Henry W. Lord	March 4, 1881 – March 4, 1883	Republican	1st	Elected in 1880. Lost re-election to Maybury.
George A. Loud	March 4, 1903 – March 4, 1913	Republican	10th	Elected in 1902. Lost re-election to Woodruff.
George A. Loud	March 4, 1915 – March 4, 1917	Republican	10th	Elected in 1914. Lost renomination to Currie.
Alfred Lucking	March 4, 1903 – March 4, 1905	Democratic	1st	Elected in 1902. Lost re-election to Denby.
John F. Luecke	January 3, 1937 – January 3, 1939	Democratic	11th	Elected in 1936. Lost re-election to F. Bradley.
Lucius Lyon	March 4, 1843 – March 4, 1845	Democratic	2nd	Elected in 1843. Retired.
William Josiah MacDonald	August 26, 1913 – March 4, 1915	Progressive	12th	Won election contest. Lost re-election to James.
Thaddeus M. Machrowicz	January 3, 1951 – September 18, 1961	Democratic	1st	Elected in 1950. Resigned to become U.S. District Judge.
John C. Mackie	January 3, 1965 – January 3, 1967	Democratic	7th	Elected in 1964. Lost re-election to Riegle.
Verner Main	December 17, 1935 – January 3, 1937	Republican	3rd	Elected to finish Kimball's term. Lost renomination to Shafer.
Carl E. Mapes	March 4, 1913 – December 12, 1939	Republican	5th	Elected in 1912. Died.
William C. Maybury	March 4, 1883 – March 4, 1887	Democratic	1st	Elected in 1882. Retired.
Lisa McClain	January 3, 2021 – January 3, 2023	Republican	10th	Elected in 2020. Redistricted to the 9th district.
Lisa McClain	January 3, 2023 – present	Republican	9th	Redistricted from the 10th district and re-elected in 2022. Incumbent.
Robert McClelland	March 4, 1843 – March 4, 1849	Democratic	1st	Elected in 1843. Retired.
Thad McCotter	January 3, 2003 – July 6, 2012	Republican	11th	Elected in 2002. Failed to qualify for renomination and resigned. (Note: McCotter had sought the nomination for Republican nomination for president, but dropped out following the Iowa Straw Poll. He then tried to qualify for the primary, however fewer than 1,000 signatures were declared valid, meaning he did not qualify to appear on the primary ballot.)
Jack H. McDonald	January 3, 1967 – January 3, 1973	Republican	19th	Elected in 1966. Lost renomination to Broomfield.
Kristen McDonald Rivet	January 3, 2025 – present	Democratic	8th	Elected in 2024. Incumbent.
Jonas H. McGowan	March 4, 1877 – March 4, 1881	Republican	3rd	Elected in 1876. Retired.
Robert J. McIntosh	January 3, 1957 – January 3, 1959	Republican	7th	Elected in 1956. Lost re-election to O'Hara.
James C. McLaughlin	March 4, 1907 – November 29, 1932	Republican	9th	Elected in 1906. Lost re-election to Musselwhite and died before next term began.
Clarence J. McLeod	November 2, 1920 – March 4, 1921	Republican	13th	Elected to finish Nichols's term. Retired.
Clarence J. McLeod	March 4, 1923 – January 3, 1937	Republican	13th	Elected in 1922. Lost re-election to O'Brien.
Clarence J. McLeod	January 3, 1939 – January 3, 1941	Republican	13th	Elected in 1938. Lost re-election to O'Brien.
Henry McMorran	March 4, 1903 – March 4, 1913	Republican	7th	Elected in 1902. Retired.
George Meader	January 3, 1951 – January 3, 1965	Republican	2nd	Elected in 1950. Lost re-election to Vivian.
Peter Meijer	January 3, 2021 – January 3, 2023	Republican	3rd	Elected in 2020. Lost renomination.
William S. Mesick	March 4, 1897 – March 4, 1901	Republican	11th	Elected in 1896. Lost renomination to Darragh.
Earl C. Michener	March 4, 1919 – March 4, 1933	Republican	2nd	Elected in 1918. Lost re-election to Lehr.
Earl C. Michener	January 3, 1935 – January 3, 1951	Republican	2nd	Elected in 1934. Retired.
Candice Miller	January 3, 2003 – December 31, 2016	Republican	10th	Elected in 2002. Retired and resigned when elected Macomb County Public Works Commissioner.
Alfred Milnes	December 2, 1895 – March 4, 1897	Republican	3rd	Elected to finish Burrows's term. Lost re-election to Todd.
Paul Mitchell	January 3, 2017 – December 14, 2020	Republican	10th	Elected in 2016. Switched parties.
Paul Mitchell	December 14, 2020 – January 3, 2021	Independent	10th	Left the Republican Party. Retired.
Seth C. Moffatt	March 4, 1885 – December 22, 1887	Republican	11th	Elected in 1884. Died.
John Moolenaar	January 3, 2015 – January 3, 2023	Republican	4th	Elected in 2014. Redistricted to the 2nd district.
John Moolenaar	January 3, 2023 – present	Republican	2nd	Redistricted from the 4th district and re-elected in 2022. Incumbent.
John W. Moon	March 4, 1893 – March 4, 1895	Republican	9th	Elected in 1892. Retired.
Harry W. Musselwhite	March 4, 1933 – January 3, 1935	Democratic	9th	Elected in 1932. Lost re-election to Engel.
Lucien N. Nedzi	November 7, 1961 – January 3, 1965	Democratic	1st	Elected to finish Machrowicz's term. Redistricted to the 14th district.
Lucien N. Nedzi	January 3, 1965 – January 3, 1981	Democratic	14th	Redistricted from the 1st district and re-elected in 1964. Retired.
John Stoughton Newberry	March 4, 1879 – March 4, 1881	Republican	1st	Elected in 1878. Retired.
Charles Archibald Nichols	March 4, 1915 – April 25, 1920	Republican	13th	Elected in 1914. Died.
David A. Noble	March 4, 1853 – March 4, 1855	Democratic	2nd	Elected in 1852. Lost re-election to Waldron.
Charles G. Oakman	January 3, 1953 – January 3, 1955	Republican	17th	Elected in 1952. Lost re-election to Griffiths.
George D. O'Brien	January 3, 1937 – January 3, 1939	Democratic	13th	Elected in 1936. Lost re-election to McLeod.
George D. O'Brien	January 3, 1941 – January 3, 1947	Democratic	13th	Elected in 1940. Lost re-election to Coffin.
George D. O'Brien	January 3, 1949 – January 3, 1955	Democratic	13th	Elected in 1948. Lost renomination to Diggs.
James O'Donnell	March 4, 1885 – March 4, 1893	Republican	3rd	Elected in 1884. Redistricted to the 2nd district and lost re-election to Gorman.
James G. O'Hara	January 3, 1959 – January 3, 1965	Democratic	7th	Elected in 1958. Redistricted to the 12th district.
James G. O'Hara	January 3, 1965 – January 3, 1977	Democratic	12th	Redistricted from the 7th district and re-elected in 1964. Retired.
George Washington Peck	March 4, 1855 – March 4, 1857	Democratic	4th	Elected in 1854. Lost re-election to Leach.
Ebenezer J. Penniman	March 4, 1851 – March 4, 1853	Whig	1st	Elected in 1850. Retired.
Seymour H. Person	March 4, 1931 – March 4, 1933	Republican	6th	Elected in 1930. Lost re-election to Cady.
Gary Peters	January 3, 2009 – January 3, 2013	Democratic	9th	Elected in 2008. Redistricted to the 14th district.
Gary Peters	January 3, 2013 – January 3, 2015	Democratic	14th	Redistricted from the 9th district and re-elected in 2012. Retired to run for U.S. Senator.
Allen Potter	March 4, 1875 – March 4, 1877	Democratic	4th	Elected in 1874. Retired.
Charles E. Potter	August 26, 1947 – November 4, 1952	Republican	11th	Elected to finish Bradley's term. Retired to run for U.S. Senator and resigned to take seat.
Carl Pursell	January 3, 1977 – January 3, 1993	Republican	2nd	Elected in 1976. Retired.
Louis C. Rabaut	January 3, 1935 – January 3, 1947	Democratic	14th	Elected in 1934. Lost re-election to Youngblood.
Louis C. Rabaut	January 3, 1949 – November 12, 1961	Democratic	14th	Elected in 1948. Died.
John T. Rich	April 5, 1881 – March 4, 1883	Republican	7th	Elected to finish Conger's term. Lost re-election to Carleton.
George F. Richardson	March 4, 1893 – March 4, 1895	Democratic	5th	Elected in 1892. (Note: With a plurality of 10 votes, Richardson received a certificate of election from the board of state canvassers. Incumbent Charles E. Belknap requested a recount in Ionia County, alleging irregularities. The Michigan Supreme Court ordered the recount on February 3, 1893, which counted a plurality of 19 votes for Belknap. The new board of state canvassers then issued a certificate of election to Belknap. The contest was brought to the U.S. House of Representatives on August 8, 1893. Following floor debate on the validity of the contestants’ credentials, the House seated Richardson, referring the matter to the Committee on Elections. Following further examination, the committee issued a report upholding Richardson’s claim to the seat.); Retired.
Donald W. Riegle Jr.	January 3, 1967 – February 27, 1973	Republican	7th	Elected in 1966. Switched parties.
Donald W. Riegle Jr.	February 27, 1973 – December 30, 1976	Democratic	7th	Joined the Democratic Party and re-elected in 1974. Retired to run for U.S. Senator and resigned following early appointment.
Lynn N. Rivers	January 3, 1995 – January 3, 2003	Democratic	13th	Elected in 1994. Redistricted to the 15th district and lost renomination to Dingell.
Mike Rogers	January 3, 2001 – January 3, 2015	Republican	8th	Elected in 2000. Retired.
Philip Ruppe	January 3, 1967 – January 3, 1979	Republican	11th	Elected in 1966. Retired.
Harold M. Ryan	February 13, 1962 – January 3, 1965	Democratic	14th	Elected to finish Rabaut's term. Lost renomination to Nedzi.
George G. Sadowski	March 4, 1933 – January 3, 1939	Democratic	1st	Elected in 1932. Lost renomination to Tenerowicz.
George G. Sadowski	January 3, 1943 – January 3, 1951	Democratic	1st	Elected in 1942. Lost renomination to Machrowicz.
Harold S. Sawyer	January 3, 1977 – January 3, 1985	Republican	5th	Elected in 1976. Retired.
Mark Schauer	January 3, 2009 – January 3, 2011	Democratic	7th	Elected in 2008. Lost re-election to Walberg.
Hillary Scholten	January 3, 2023 – present	Democratic	3rd	Elected in 2022. Incumbent.
Bill Schuette	January 3, 1985 – January 3, 1991	Republican	10th	Elected in 1984. Retired to run for U.S. Senator.
Joe Schwarz	January 3, 2005 – January 3, 2007	Republican	7th	Elected in 2004. Lost renomination to Walberg.
Frank D. Scott	March 4, 1915 – March 4, 1927	Republican	11th	Elected in 1914. Lost renomination to Bohn.
Henry W. Seymour	February 14, 1888 – March 4, 1889	Republican	11th	Elected to finish Moffatt's term. Lost renomination to Stephenson.
Paul W. Shafer	January 3, 1937 – August 17, 1954	Republican	3rd	Elected in 1936. Died.
Carlos D. Shelden	March 4, 1897 – March 4, 1903	Republican	12th	Elected in 1896. Lost renomination to Young.
Mark D. Siljander	April 21, 1981 – January 3, 1987	Republican	4th	Elected to finish Stockman's term. Lost renomination to Upton.
Elissa Slotkin	January 3, 2019 – January 3, 2023	Democratic	8th	Elected in 2018. Redistricted to the 7th district.
Elissa Slotkin	January 3, 2023 – January 3, 2025	Democratic	7th	Redistricted from the 8th district and re-elected in 2022. Retired to run for U.S. Senator.
Henry C. Smith	March 4, 1899 – March 4, 1903	Republican	2nd	Elected in 1898. Lost renomination to Townsend.
John M. C. Smith	March 4, 1911 – March 4, 1921	Republican	3rd	Elected in 1910. Retired.
John M. C. Smith	June 28, 1921 – March 30, 1923	Republican	3rd	Elected to finish Frankhauser's term. Died.
Nick Smith	January 3, 1993 – January 3, 2005	Republican	7th	Elected in 1992. Retired.
Samuel William Smith	March 4, 1897 – March 4, 1915	Republican	6th	Elected in 1896. Retired.
William Alden Smith	March 4, 1895 – February 9, 1907	Republican	5th	Elected in 1894. Re-elected but resigned when elected U.S. Senator.
Horace G. Snover	March 4, 1895 – March 4, 1899	Republican	7th	Elected in 1894. Retired.
John B. Sosnowski	March 4, 1925 – March 4, 1927	Republican	1st	Elected in 1924. Lost renomination to Clancy.
George Spalding	March 4, 1895 – March 4, 1899	Republican	2nd	Elected in 1894. Lost renomination to H. Smith.
Oliver L. Spaulding	March 4, 1881 – March 4, 1883	Republican	6th	Elected in 1880. Lost re-election to Winans.
William Sprague	March 4, 1849 – March 4, 1851	Whig	2nd	Elected in 1848. Retired.
Debbie Stabenow	January 3, 1997 – January 3, 2001	Democratic	8th	Elected in 1996. Retired to run for U.S. Senator.
Neil Staebler	January 3, 1963 – January 3, 1965	Democratic	At-large	Elected in 1962. Retired to run for Governor of Michigan.
Samuel M. Stephenson	March 4, 1889 – March 4, 1893	Republican	11th	Elected in 1888. Redistricted to the 12th district.
Samuel M. Stephenson	March 4, 1893 – March 4, 1897	Republican	12th	Redistricted from the 11th district and re-elected in 1892. Retired.
Haley Stevens	January 3, 2019 – present	Democratic	11th	Elected in 2018. Incumbent.
Hestor L. Stevens	March 4, 1853 – March 4, 1855	Democratic	4th	Elected in 1852. Retired.
David Stockman	January 3, 1977 – January 21, 1981	Republican	4th	Elected in 1976. Resigned to become Director of the Office of Management and Budget.
John W. Stone	March 4, 1877 – March 4, 1881	Republican	5th	Elected in 1876. Retired.
William L. Stoughton	March 4, 1869 – March 4, 1873	Republican	2nd	Elected in 1868. Retired.
Byron G. Stout	March 4, 1891 – March 4, 1893	Democratic	6th	Elected in 1890. Lost re-election to Aitken.
Randolph Strickland	March 4, 1869 – March 4, 1871	Republican	6th	Elected in 1868. Lost renomination to Driggs.
Charles E. Stuart	December 6, 1847 – March 4, 1849	Democratic	2nd	Elected to finish E. Bradley's term. Lost re-election to Sprague.
Charles E. Stuart	March 4, 1851 – March 4, 1853	Democratic	2nd	Elected in 1850. Retired to run for U.S. senator.
David Stuart	March 4, 1853 – March 4, 1855	Democratic	1st	Elected in 1852. Lost re-election to W. Howard.
Bart Stupak	January 3, 1993 – January 3, 2011	Democratic	1st	Elected in 1992. Retired.
Jabez G. Sutherland	March 4, 1871 – March 4, 1873	Democratic	6th	Elected in 1870. Retired.
Edwin F. Sweet	March 4, 1911 – March 4, 1913	Democratic	5th	Elected in 1910. Lost re-election to Mapes.
Timothy E. Tarsney	March 4, 1885 – March 4, 1889	Democratic	8th	Elected in 1884. Lost re-election to Bliss.
Rudolph G. Tenerowicz	January 3, 1939 – January 3, 1943	Democratic	1st	Elected in 1938. Lost renomination to Sadowski.
Shri Thanedar	January 3, 2023 – present	Democratic	13th	Elected in 2022. Incumbent.
Henry F. Thomas	March 4, 1893 – March 4, 1897	Republican	4th	Elected in 1892. Lost renomination to Hamilton.
Ruth Thompson	January 3, 1951 – January 3, 1957	Republican	9th	Elected in 1950. Lost renomination to Griffin.
Rashida Tlaib	January 3, 2019 – January 3, 2023	Democratic	13th	Elected in 2018. Redistricted to the 12th district.
Rashida Tlaib	January 3, 2023 – present	Democratic	12th	Redistricted from the 13th district and re-elected in 2022. Incumbent.
Albert M. Todd	March 4, 1897 – March 4, 1899	Democratic	3rd	Elected in 1896. Lost re-election to Gardner.
Paul H. Todd Jr.	January 3, 1965 – January 3, 1967	Democratic	3rd	Elected in 1964. Lost re-election to G. Brown.
Charles E. Townsend	March 4, 1903 – March 4, 1911	Republican	2nd	Elected in 1902. Retired to run for U.S. Senator.
Andrew J. Transue	January 3, 1937 – January 3, 1939	Democratic	6th	Elected in 1936. Lost re-election to Blackney.
J. Bob Traxler	April 23, 1974 – January 3, 1993	Democratic	8th	Elected to finish Harvey's term. Retired.
David Trott	January 3, 2015 – January 3, 2019	Republican	11th	Elected in 2014. Retired.
Rowland E. Trowbridge	March 4, 1861 – March 4, 1863	Republican	4th	Elected in 1860. Redistricted to the 5th district and lost re-election to Baldwin.
Rowland E. Trowbridge	March 4, 1865 – March 4, 1869	Republican	5th	Elected in 1864. Lost renomination to O. Conger.
Charles Upson	March 4, 1863 – March 4, 1869	Republican	2nd	Elected in 1862. Retired.
Fred Upton	January 3, 1987 – January 3, 1993	Republican	4th	Elected in 1986. Redistricted to the 6th district.
Fred Upton	January 3, 1993 – January 3, 2023	Republican	6th	Redistricted from the 4th district and re-elected in 1992. Retired.
Guy Vander Jagt	November 8, 1966 – January 3, 1993	Republican	9th	Elected to finish Griffin's term. Redistricted to the 2nd district and lost renomination to Hoekstra.
Richard VanderVeen	February 18, 1974 – January 3, 1977	Democratic	5th	Elected to finish Ford's term. Lost re-election to Sawyer.
Bird J. Vincent	March 4, 1923 – July 18, 1931	Republican	8th	Elected in 1922. Died.
Weston E. Vivian	January 3, 1965 – January 3, 1967	Democratic	2nd	Elected in 1964. Lost re-election to Esch.
Tim Walberg	January 3, 2007 – January 3, 2009	Republican	7th	Elected in 2006. Lost re-election to Schauer.
Tim Walberg	January 3, 2011 – January 3, 2023	Republican	7th	Elected in 2010. Redistricted to the 5th district.
Tim Walberg	January 3, 2023 – present	Republican	5th	Redistricted from the 7th district and re-elected in 2022. Incumbent.
David S. Walbridge	March 4, 1855 – March 4, 1859	Republican	3rd	Elected in 1854. Retired.
Henry Waldron	March 4, 1855 – March 4, 1861	Republican	2nd	Elected in 1854. Retired.
Henry Waldron	March 4, 1871 – March 4, 1873	Republican	1st	Elected in 1870. Redistricted to the 2nd district.
Henry Waldron	March 4, 1873 – March 4, 1877	Republican	2nd	Redistricted from the 1st district and re-elected in 1872. Retired.
Thomas A. E. Weadock	March 4, 1891 – March 4, 1895	Democratic	10th	Elected in 1890. Retired.
George W. Webber	March 4, 1881 – March 4, 1883	Republican	5th	Elected in 1880. Retired.
William W. Wedemeyer	March 4, 1911 – January 2, 1913	Republican	2nd	Elected in 1910. Lost re-election to Beakes and died before next term began.
Edgar Weeks	March 4, 1899 – March 4, 1903	Republican	7th	Elected in 1898. Lost renomination to McMorran.
Carl M. Weideman	March 4, 1933 – January 3, 1935	Democratic	14th	Elected in 1932. Lost renomination to Rabaut.
Frank W. Wheeler	March 4, 1889 – March 4, 1891	Republican	10th	Elected in 1888. Retired.
Harrison H. Wheeler	March 4, 1891 – March 4, 1893	Democratic	9th	Elected in 1890. Lost re-election to Moon.
Justin Rice Whiting	March 4, 1887 – March 4, 1895	Democratic	7th	Elected in 1886. Retired.
George Willard	March 4, 1873 – March 4, 1877	Republican	3rd	Elected in 1872. Retired.
Alpheus S. Williams	March 4, 1875 – December 21, 1878	Democratic	1st	Elected in 1874. Lost re-election to Newberry and died before next term began.
Arthur B. Williams	June 19, 1923 – May 1, 1925	Republican	3rd	Elected to finish J. Smith's term. Died.
William B. Williams	December 1, 1873 – March 4, 1877	Republican	5th	Elected to finish Foster's term. Retired.
Edwin Willits	March 4, 1877 – March 4, 1883	Republican	2nd	Elected in 1876. Retired.
Edwin B. Winans	March 4, 1883 – March 4, 1887	Democratic	6th	Elected in 1882. Retired.
Jesse P. Wolcott	March 4, 1931 – January 3, 1957	Republican	7th	Elected in 1930. Retired.
Howard Wolpe	January 3, 1979 – January 3, 1993	Democratic	3rd	Elected in 1978. Retired to run for Governor of Michigan.
Roy O. Woodruff	March 4, 1913 – March 4, 1915	Progressive	10th	Elected in 1912. Lost re-election to Loud.
Roy O. Woodruff	March 4, 1921 – January 3, 1953	Republican	10th	Elected in 1920. Retired.
George L. Yaple	March 4, 1883 – March 4, 1885	Democratic	4th	Elected in 1882. Lost re-election to Burrows.
Henry M. Youmans	March 4, 1891 – March 4, 1893	Democratic	8th	Elected in 1890. Lost re-election to Linton.
H. Olin Young	March 4, 1903 – May 16, 1913	Republican	12th	Elected in 1902. Resigned while a contest for the seat was pending, and lost election contest.
Harold F. Youngblood	January 3, 1947 – January 3, 1949	Republican	14th	Elected in 1946. Lost re-election to Rabaut.

== See also ==
- List of United States senators from Michigan
- Michigan's congressional delegations
- Michigan's congressional districts
