= Michigan Five Fluke Freshmen =

5 U.S. Congressmen elected as Democrats in 1964

The Michigan Five Fluke Freshmen is the name given to five members of the U.S. House of Representatives who were elected in the Democratic landslide of 1964 and were subsequently defeated just two years later by a Republican resurgence. They included Paul Todd, Raymond Clevenger, Billie Farnum, John Mackie, and Wes Vivian. All of the five were one-term congressmen.

== 1964: LBJ landslide ==
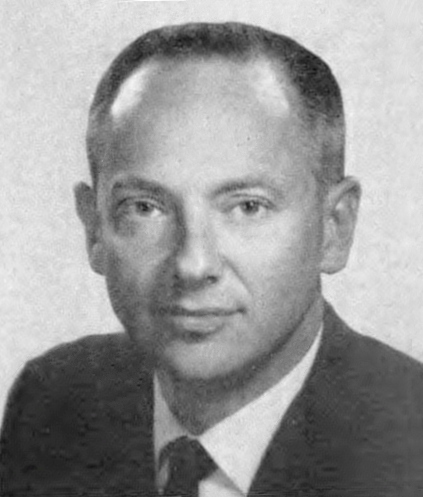
Wes Vivian of Ann Arbor

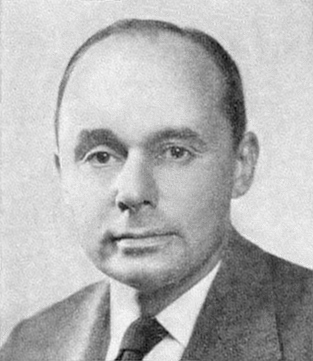
Paul Todd of Kalamazoo

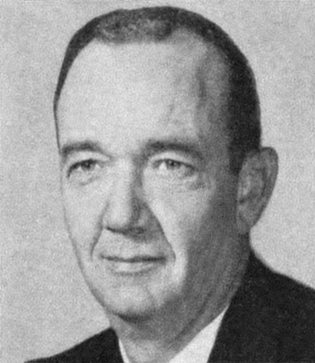
John C. Mackie of Flint

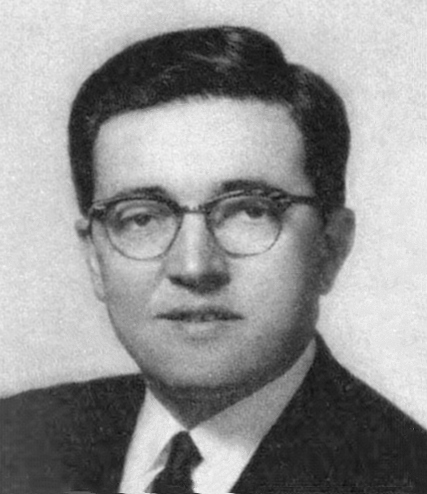
Ray Clevenger of Sault Ste. Marie

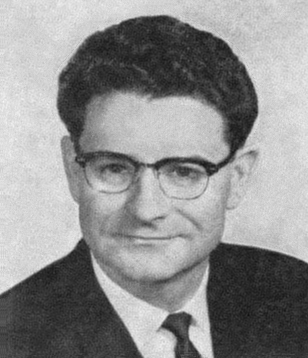
Billie Farnum of Drayton Plains

With President Lyndon B. Johnson taking over 67% of the vote in Michigan, the Democrats were able to win five districts formerly represented by Republicans, and change the Michigan Congressional delegation from 12 to 7 Republican to 12 to 7 Democratic. Three of the defeated Republicans had significant seniority. The Democratic gains took place in District 2 (based in the Ann Arbor area), District 3 (set around Kalamazoo and Battle Creek), District 7 (Flint and its surrounding region), District 11 (northern lower Michigan and the Upper Peninsula), and District 19 (suburban Detroit). Nationally Democrats gained 36 seats from the Republicans in the House.

1964 U.S. House Michigan Congressional District 2 Election
Party	Candidate	Votes	%
Democratic	Wes Vivian	77,806	50.5
Republican	George Meader (Inc)	76,280	49.5

1964 U.S. House Michigan Congressional District 3 Election
Party	Candidate	Votes	%
Democratic	Paul Todd	85,001	52.7
Republican	August Johansen (Inc)	76,350	47.3

1964 U.S. House Michigan Congressional District 7 Election
Party	Candidate	Votes	%
Democratic	John Mackie	104,115	65.7
Republican	Claude Sadler	54,307	34.3

1964 U.S. House Michigan Congressional District 11 Election
Party	Candidate	Votes	%
Democratic	Raymond Clevenger	86,557	53.3
Republican	Victor Knox (Inc)	75,955	46.7

1964 U.S. House Michigan Congressional District 19 Election
Party	Candidate	Votes	%
Democratic	Billie Farnum	88,441	53.4
Republican	Richard Kuhn	77,204	46.6

== 1966: Republican resurgence ==
Richard Nixon took an active interest in the 1966 midterm elections in Michigan, especially these five races. He personally persuaded Donald Riegle to leave academia and run against Mackie, and appeared at a fundraiser for Riegle's campaign early in the primary season. Nixon campaigned for the five Republican challengers during the whole campaign, and played them up to reporters. Political analyst Rhodes Cook wrote that "no politician had used the midterm election year more effectively than former Vice President Richard Nixon, who with his young aide-de camp, Pat Buchanan, took to the 'rubber chicken circuit' on behalf of Republican candidates across the country." None of the Democrats had run as strongly as Johnson in 1964, indicating their potential weakness.

The increasing unpopularity of President Johnson's Great Society, rising crime, radical campus protests, and racial riots coupled with the coattail effect of popular Republican Governor George W. Romney at the top of the state ticket all led to a downturn for the Democratic Party. Growing dissatisfaction with the war in Vietnam was also a factor.

The Republicans succeeded in recapturing the five districts they lost in 1964 and returned the delegation to a 12 to 7 Republican majority. Nationally the Republicans gained 47 seats from the Democrats in the House.

In 1973, Riegle switched from the Republican Party to the Democratic Party, and went on to serve three terms in the United States Senate as a Democrat.

1966 U.S. House Michigan Congressional District 2 Election.
Party	Candidate	Votes	%
Republican	Marvin Esch	65,205	51
Democratic	Wes Vivian (Inc)	62,536	49

1966 U.S. House Michigan Congressional District 3 Election.
Party	Candidate	Votes	%
Republican	Garry E. Brown	68,912	52.2
Democratic	Paul Todd (Inc)	62,984	48.8

1966 U.S. House Michigan Congressional District 7 Election.
Party	Candidate	Votes	%
Republican	Don Riegle	71,166	54
Democratic	John Mackie (Inc)	60,408	46

1966 U.S. House Michigan Congressional District 11 Election.
Party	Candidate	Votes	%
Republican	Philip Ruppe	70,820	51.8
Democratic	Raymond Clevenger (Inc)	65,875	48.2

1966 U.S. House Michigan Congressional District 19 Election.
Party	Candidate	Votes	%
Republican	Jack McDonald	76,884	57
Democratic	Billie Farnum (Inc)	57,907	43
