= Philip Ruppe =

American politician (1926–2026)

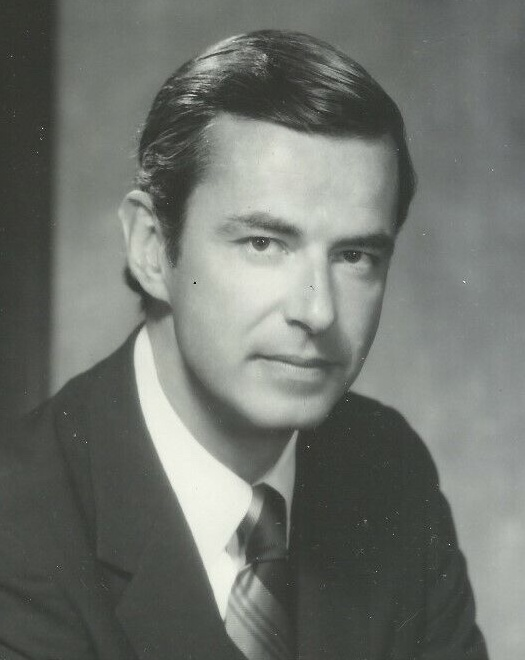
- Ruppe in 1975

Member of the U.S. House of Representatives from Michigan's 11th district
- In office January 3, 1967 – January 3, 1979
- Preceded by: Raymond F. Clevenger
- Succeeded by: Bob Davis

Personal details
- Born: Philip Edward Ruppe; September 29, 1926 Laurium, Michigan, U.S.
- Died: August 1, 2026 (aged 99) Bethesda, Maryland, U.S.
- Party: Republican
- Spouse(s): Loret Miller (m. 1957; died 1996) Ann Hammond Boutell (m. 2000; died 2022)
- Children: 5
- Education: Central Michigan University; University of Michigan; Yale University (BA)

Military service
- Branch/service: United States Navy
- Rank: Lieutenant
- Battles/wars: Korean War

Philip Edward Ruppe (/ˈruːpi/; September 29, 1926 – August 1, 2026) was an American politician and businessman who served as a member of the United States House of Representatives from Michigan's 11th congressional district for six terms from 1967 to 1979. He ran unsuccessfully for the United States Senate in 1978 and 1982.

A member of the Republican Party, he was a Korean War veteran, having served as a lieutenant in the United States Navy. After leaving the U.S. House of Representatives, Ruppe became active in business before running unsuccessfully for the U.S. House once more to represent the 1st district.

== Early life ==
Philip Edward Ruppe was born in the small town of Laurium, Michigan, on September 29, 1926. He was of Slovak and Slovenian descent. Ruppe attended the V-12 Navy College Training Program at Central Michigan University and the University of Michigan from 1944 to 1946 and graduated from Yale University in 1948.

Ruppe served in the United States Navy during the Korean War as a lieutenant. Following his military service, he served as the director of Houghton National Bank, Commercial National Bank of L'Anse and R.L. Polk & Company.

== U.S. House of Representatives ==
In 1966, Ruppe was the Republican Party candidate for the United States House of Representatives from Michigan's 11th congressional district. He defeated incumbent Democratic Party member Raymond F. Clevenger, one of the "Five Fluke Freshmen" elected to the 90th United States Congress from Michigan. His congressional campaign victory was attributed to the election of George W. Romney as governor.

During his congressional career, he was considered to be a moderate Republican. He also developed friendships with some of the congressional freshman he had been elected with such as George H. W. Bush of Texas, Robert Taft Jr. of Ohio, and Margaret Heckler of Massachusetts. Ruppe was subsequently re-elected five more times.

Ruppe was the primary sponsor of six bills that were enacted as law: a bill to amend the 1960 Great Lakes Pilotage Act, another to amend the 1936 Merchant Marine Act, two bills related to the establishment of the Father Marquette National Memorial near St. Ignace, Michigan, a bill to grant an undocumented child adopted by an unmarried U.S. citizen the same immigrant status as an undocumented child adopted by a married U.S. citizen, and a bill to permit the Department of the Interior to convey certain lands in Michigan to the Wisconsin Michigan Power Company.

During his time in the U.S. House, Ruppe was noted for his bipartisanship. He also successfully advocated for federal recognition of the Isle Royale National Park Wilderness area, Pictured Rocks National Lakeshore, and the Seney National Wildlife Refuge.

=== 1978 Senate campaign and retirement ===
In January 1978, Ruppe announced that he would not run for re-election to the 96th Congress. Ruppe was considering running for the United States Senate in 1978 following Robert P. Griffin's initial retirement announcement. However, when Governor William Milliken pressured Griffin to rescind his retirement, Griffin re-entered the race and Ruppe ended his brief Senate bid.

Republican Bob Davis from the town of St. Ignace, Michigan, won the 1978 election for his former House seat.

== Later career ==
After leaving Congress, Ruppe was an unsuccessful candidate for the U.S. Senate in 1982 against Donald Riegle.

After a decade out of politics, Ruppe sought to retake his old district, now renumbered as the 1st congressional district, in 1992. He lost to former Michigan House of Representatives member Bart Stupak.

Ruppe was a member of the American Legion, Veterans of Foreign Wars, and Rotary International. He served as president of Woodlak Company until 1986.

== Personal life and death ==
Ruppe married his first wife, Loret Miller Ruppe, in 1957. Loret was a member of the United States Electoral College for Michigan in 1980, Director of the Peace Corps from 1981 to 1989, and U.S. Ambassador to Norway from 1989 to 1993. They had five daughters.

After Miller's death on August 6, 1996, he then married his second wife, Ann Hammond Boutell of Palm Beach, Florida, in 2000. Ann Boutell Ruppe died on December 25, 2022.

Ruppe died in Bethesda, Maryland, on August 1, 2026, at the age of 99. (Note: Ruppe's death was reported three days later and erroneously said to be on August 3. His official obituary from The Washington Post corrected his death date as August 1.)

== Notes ==
U.S. House of Representatives
Preceded by Raymond F. Clevenger	Member of the U.S. House of Representatives from Michigan's 11th congressional district 1967–1979	Succeeded by Bob Davis
Party political offices
Preceded by Marvin L. Esch	Republican nominee for U.S. Senator from Michigan (Class 1); 1982	Succeeded by James Whitney Dunn
