= 1988 United States Senate election in Michigan =

Election in Michigan

- November 8, 1988
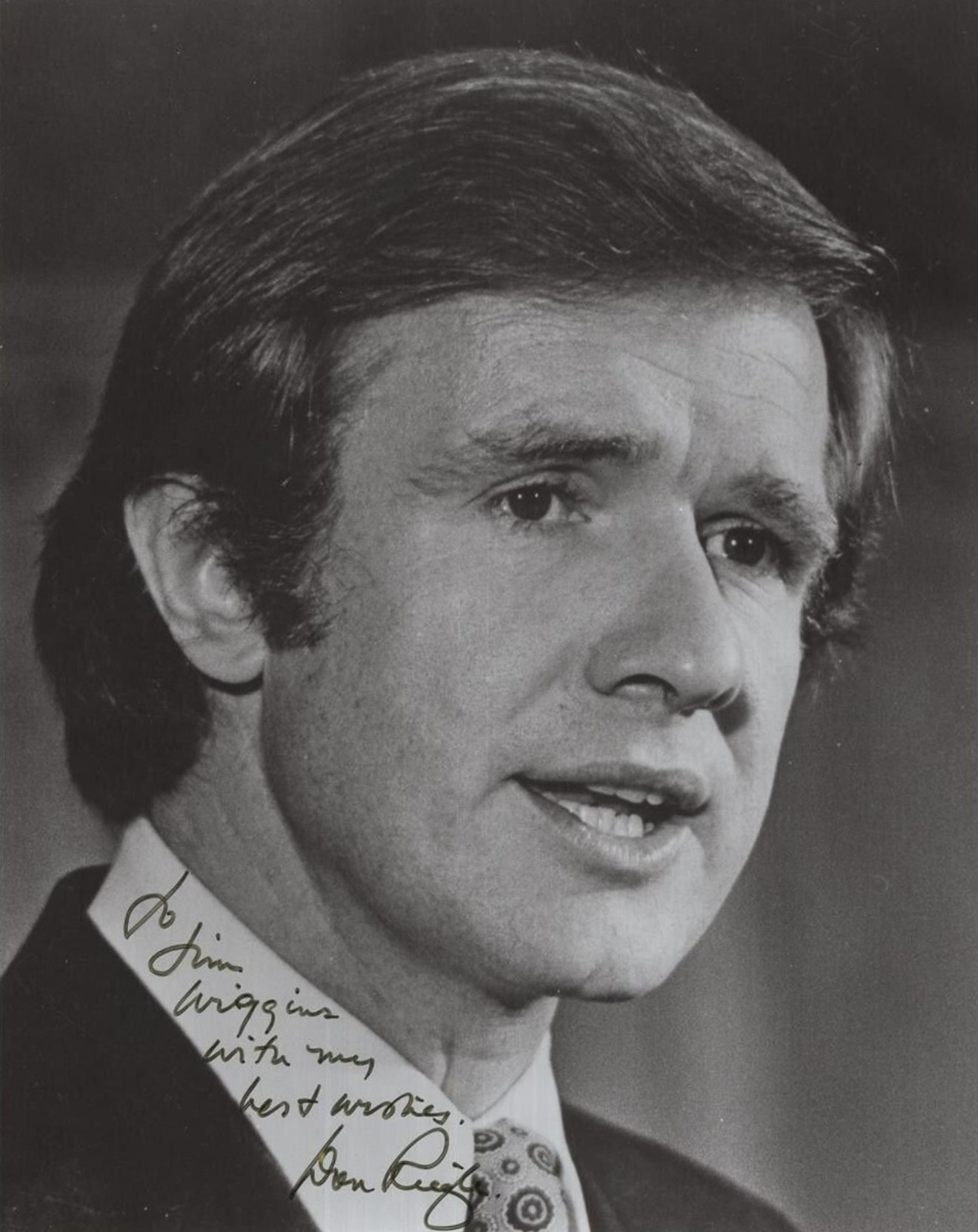

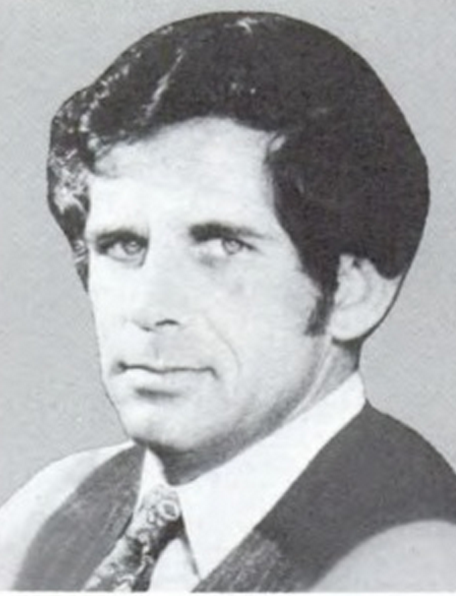
Nominee	Don Riegle	James Whitney Dunn
Party	Democratic	Republican
Popular vote	2,116,865	1,348,216
Percentage	60.38%	38.46%
- County results Riegle: 50–60% 60–70% 70–80% Dunn: 40–50% 50–60% 60–70%
U.S. senator before election
Don Riegle
Democratic
Elected U.S. Senator
Don Riegle
Democratic

The 1988 United States Senate election in Michigan was held on November 8, 1988. Incumbent Democratic U.S. Senator Don Riegle won re-election to a third term. Despite George H. W. Bush’s landslide victory in Michigan and the rest of the country, Riegle’s margin of victory increased from the previous one.

== General election ==
=== Candidates ===
- Sally Bier (Workers Against Concessions)
- James Whitney Dunn, former U.S. Representative from East Lansing (1981–83) (Republican)
- Mark Friedman (Independent)
- Dick Jacobs (Libertarian)
- Don Riegle, incumbent U.S. Senator since 1976 (Democratic)

=== Results ===
General election results
Party	Candidate	Votes	%
Democratic	Donald Riegle (incumbent)	2,116,865	60.38%
Republican	Jim Dunn	1,348,216	38.46%
Libertarian	Dick Jacobs	27,116	0.77%
Workers Against Concessions	Sally Bier	8,908	0.25%
Independent	Mark Friedman	4,821	0.14%
Total votes		3,505,926	100.00%
Democratic hold			

== See also ==
- 1988 United States Senate elections
