= Laurence Todd =

Laurence Todd (1882–1957) was an American journalist who worked as a news agency correspondent in Washington, DC. A committed radical, Todd worked as personal secretary to Socialist Congressman Meyer London from 1915 to 1916. Todd is best remembered as a correspondent for the Soviet news agency TASS for nearly three decades, a relationship about which he was interrogated in a hearing of the United States Senate in April 1956.

== Biography ==
=== Early years ===
Laurence Todd, known as "Larry" to his friends, was born in Nottawa, St. Joseph County, Michigan on December 15, 1882. His father was a civil engineer and farmer.

Todd attended primary school in the village of Colon before moving to Ann Arbor, where he attended and graduated high school.

Todd went into journalism at an early age, working as a reporter for the Kalamazoo Gazette of Kalamazoo, Michigan in 1904 and 1905. In the fall of 1905, Todd enrolled at the University of Michigan, where he studied literature. He would remain at the university for 2 1/2 years but left in 1908 without graduating.

In 1909, Todd set out for California, where he took a job as a news reporter with the San Francisco Bulletin. Todd would remain there less than a year before moving to a similar position at the San Francisco Daily News, where he would remain until 1912. Todd was made the Sacramento-based correspondent for Scripps newspapers throughout the state of California in 1912, before being sent to Washington, D.C. as a correspondent for the United Press Bureau, covering the U.S. Senate. He left this position in 1913 to join the International News Service, a post which he would hold until 1915.

=== Socialist aide and journalist ===
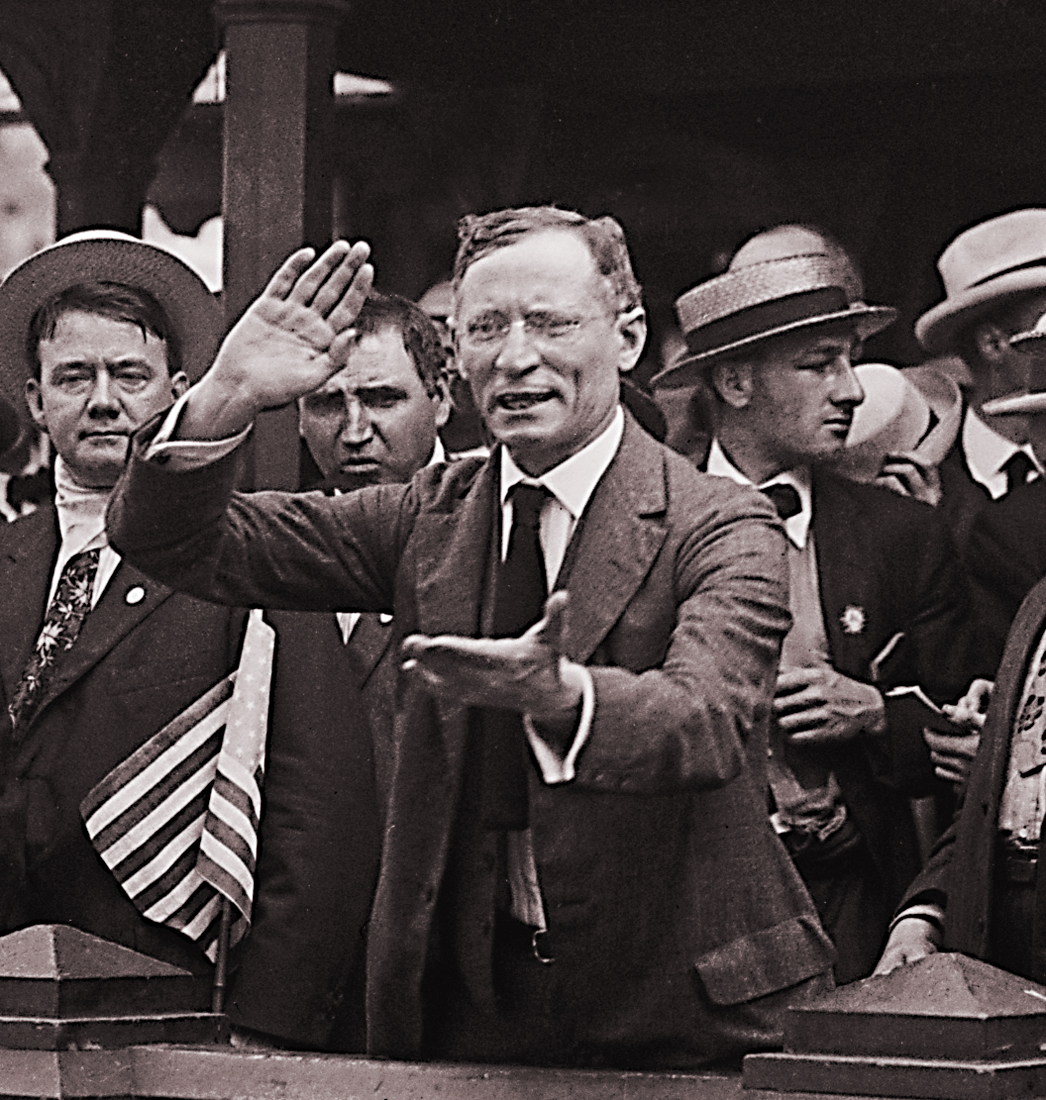
Socialist congressman Meyer London, for whom Laurence Todd served as secretary from 1915 to 1916.

In November 1914 Socialist Party candidate for Congress Meyer London won election to office from his Lower East Side 12th Congressional District of New York City. In need of a skilled journalist of radical political proclivities familiar with the intellectual landscape of the nation's capital, London tapped Todd to serve as his secretary and he would remain in this position through 1916.

With the coming of World War I Congressman London turned to support of war, in contrast to the radical opposition to the conflict of the Socialist Party leadership and rank and file. Todd left London in 1917, going to work as the Washington correspondent of the Non-Partisan Leader, newspaper of the national Non-Partisan League. Todd also reported on legislative matters for the publications of the Civil Liberties Bureau and the National Association for the Advancement of Colored People through 1919.

In 1920 Todd took a position as a staff correspondent of the Federated Press, a labor news service which would soon come to be dominated by the Communist Party. He was dispatched to Europe as a correspondent of the Federated Press in 1922, remaining there through 1923.

=== Correspondent for TASS ===
Upon his return to the United States in 1923, Todd continued to work for the Federated Press from Washington, DC for the next ten years. He also took a job working part-time for the Soviet TASS news agency, remaining a part-time employee until 1933, when he was converted to full-time status. He would remain the primary Washington, DC press correspondent for TASS until his replacement by Soviet citizen Mikhail Federov in 1949. Todd would remain on the TASS payroll as a full-time employee until his retirement in June 1952.

In April 1934, Todd briefly found himself in the national news when he was the subject of an allegation by educator William A. Wirt of Gary, Indiana that he had discovered a radical plot at a dinner party. Wirt accused Todd of likening President Franklin D. Roosevelt to ephemeral Russian leader Alexander Kerensky who would be shortly replaced by a "Stalin" in the coming revolution. This and other charges against other dinner party guests were parlayed into a Congressional hearing on a so-called "Brain Trust Revolution" chaired by conservative North Carolina Democrat Alfred L. Bulwinkle. Called to testify, Todd denied saying any such thing at the September 1933 dinner party, adding that Wirt had a "weird idea of the conversation" that transpired and had in fact monopolized the evening talking himself. The hearing fizzled and was soon forgotten.

The occupational relationship to the Soviet news agency kept Todd under close government scrutiny, culminating in a subpoena to appear before a subcommittee of the U.S. Senate Judiciary Committee on April 17, 1956. In his testimony Todd swore under oath that he had never been a member of the Communist Party at any time in his life. Moreover, Todd swore that he had "never attended any Communist meeting in my life, to the best of my knowledge."

With respect to his actual job tasks, Todd stated:

"I was in charge of a Washington report for the TASS Agency, which is located in New York. I was a correspondent here, and I gathered news and sent it. I was in charge of the local accounts of the bureau, the expense accounts, and things like that. I never employed anyone. I neither had authority to employ nor to dismiss anyone."

During his testimony, Todd declared that he "never knew" the State Department's Alger Hiss, but refused to answer according to his rights under the Fifth Amendment when asked whether he knew Nathan Gregory Silvermaster or William Ludwig Ullman, two individuals implicated in 1948 for Soviet espionage activity.

=== Death and legacy ===
Laurence Todd died November 30, 1957.

Todd's papers, including correspondence and diaries totaling one linear foot, is housed at the Bentley Historical Library of the University of Michigan in Ann Arbor. Todd also left an unpublished 670-page memoir completed in 1954 entitled Correspondent on the Left, the manuscript of which is housed at the Hoover Institution Archives at Stanford University in Stanford, California.

Laurence Todd was the nephew of Albert May Todd (1850–1931), known as "The Peppermint King of Kalamazoo," a wealthy left wing philanthropist who was an early member of the American Civil Liberties Union and founder of the Public Ownership League of America in 1916.
