= 1982 United States Senate election in Michigan =

- November 2, 1982
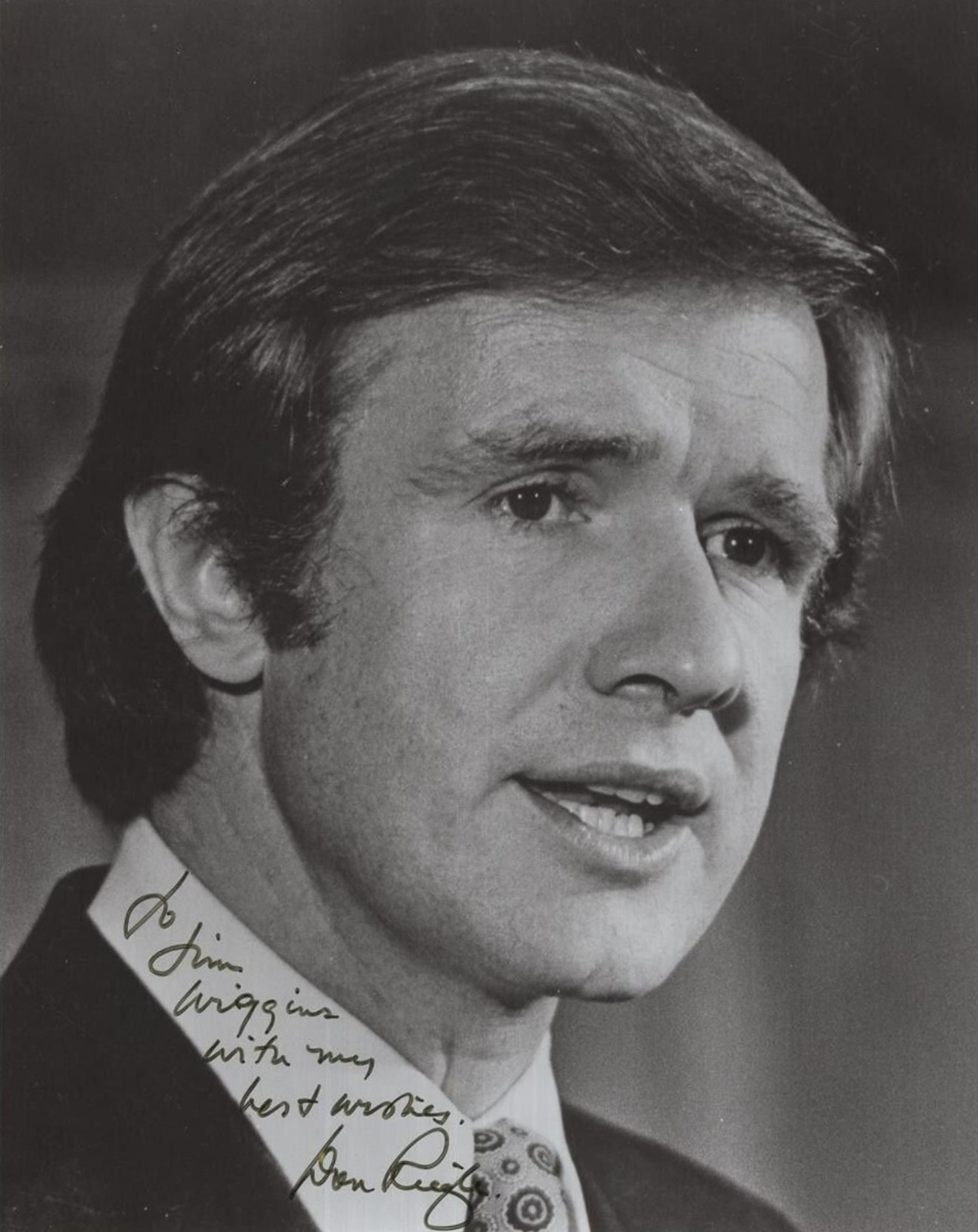

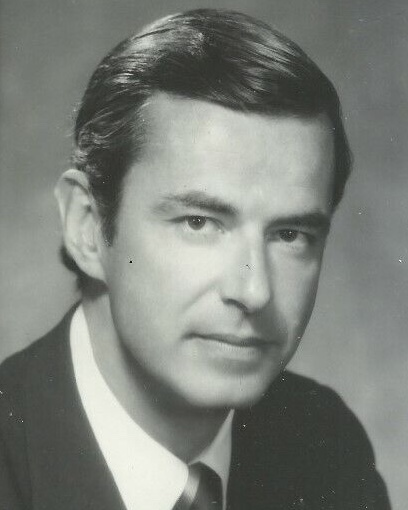
Nominee	Don Riegle	Philip Ruppe
Party	Democratic	Republican
Popular vote	1,728,793	1,223,288
Percentage	57.74%	40.85%
- County results Riegle: 50–60% 60–70% 70–80% Ruppe: 50–60% 60–70%
U.S. senator before election
Don Riegle
Democratic
Elected U.S. Senator
Don Riegle
Democratic

The 1982 United States Senate election in Michigan took place on November 2, 1982. Incumbent Democratic U.S. Senator Don Riegle was re-elected to a second term in office, defeating Republican U.S. Representative Philip Ruppe.

== Republican primary ==
=== Candidates ===
- Deane Baker, candidate for U.S. Senate in 1976
- William S. Ballenger Jr., son of Buick Motors founder William Ballenger and candidate for U.S. Representative in 1974
- Robert J. Huber, former U.S. Representative from Troy and candidate for U.S. Senate in 1970 and 1976
- Philip Ruppe, former U.S. Representative from Houghton

=== Results ===
Republican primary results
Party	Candidate	Votes	%
Republican	Philip Ruppe	253,082	45.99%
Republican	William S. Ballenger Jr.	122,523	22.27%
Republican	Robert J. Huber	102,693	18.67%
Republican	Deane Baker	71,902	13.07%
Total votes		550,200	100.00%

== General election ==
=== Results ===
1982 United States Senate election in Michigan
Party	Candidate	Votes	%	±%
Democratic	Don Riegle (incumbent)	1,728,793	57.74%	▲5.28
Republican	Philip Ruppe	1,223,288	40.85%	▼6.00
Libertarian	Bette Erwin	19,131	0.64%	▲0.39
American Independent	Daniel Eller	12,660	0.42%	N/A
Socialist Equality	Helen Halyard	6,085	0.20%	N/A
Socialist Workers	Steve Beumer	4,335	0.15%	▲0.05
Total votes		2,994,292	100.00%	
Democratic hold		Swing		

== See also ==
- 1982 United States Senate elections
