= John C. Mackie =

American politician (1920–2008)

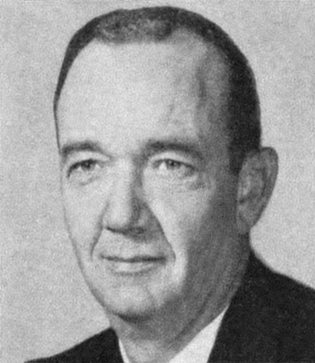

Member of the U.S. House of Representatives from Michigan's 7th district
- In office January 3, 1965 – January 3, 1967
- Preceded by: District established (redistricting)
- Succeeded by: Donald Riegle

9th Michigan State Highway Commissioner
- In office July 1, 1957 – January 4, 1965
- Governor: G. Mennen Williams; John Swainson; George W. Romney
- Preceded by: Charles M. Ziegler
- Succeeded by: Office abolished (Howard E. Hill, first MDSH Director)

Personal details
- Born: John Currie Mackie; June 1, 1920 Toronto, Ontario, Canada
- Died: March 5, 2008 (aged 87) Warrenton, Virginia
- Party: Democratic

John Currie Mackie (June 1, 1920 – March 5, 2008) was an American World War II veteran, transportation engineer, and politician from the U.S. state of Michigan. He served one term in the U.S. House of Representatives from 1965 to 1967.

== Biography ==
Mackie was born in Toronto, Ontario, and immigrated to the United States from Canada in 1924 with his parents, who settled in Detroit, Michigan. He graduated from Southeastern High School in Detroit in 1938 and attended Lawrence Institute of Technology from 1938 until 1939. He received a B.S. in Engineering from Michigan State University in 1942 and an honorary LL.D. from the same school in 1965.

He was employed on airplane engine design in Detroit, 1942 and served in the United States Army Air Corps, from 1942 to 1945. He served in the Pacific Theater until discharged as a first lieutenant.

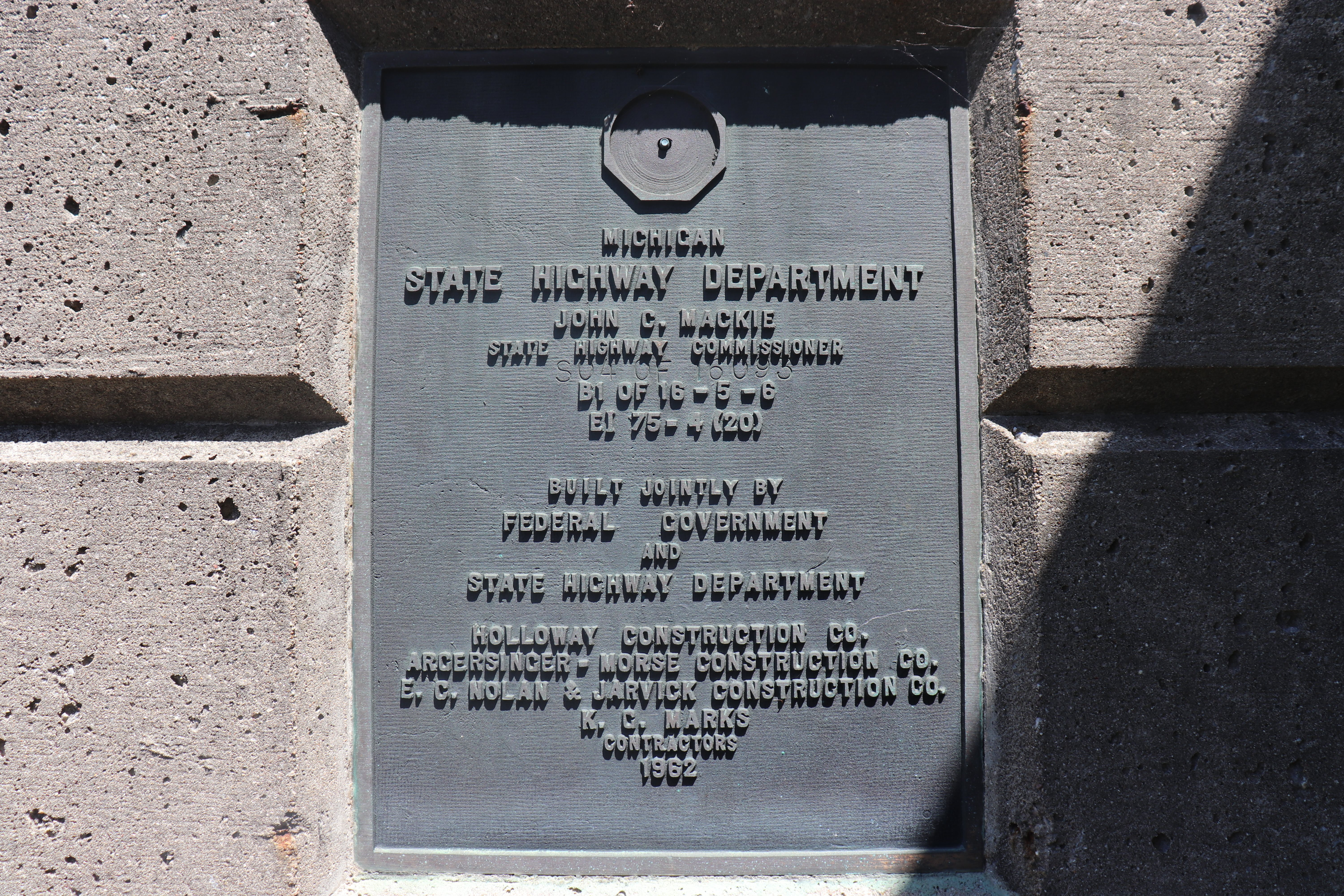
A plaque located on a bridge on Interstate 75 (I-75) near Indian River contains Mackie's name on it. All state highway bridges built during Mackie's term contain a plaque similar to this.

=== Career ===
Mackie was employed by an engineering firm in the Flint area from 1946 to 1952, and organized the Flint Surveying & Engineering Co. in 1952. He was Genesee County surveyor from 1952 until 1956 and was elected State Highway Commissioner of Michigan in 1957 and reelected in 1961 to a new four-year term. Mackie was quoted as being critical of the increasing popularity of compact cars, saying, "They may be socially desirable in some parts of the country, but I think they are a nuisance. If they really take hold—and I don't think they will—then it is inevitable that gas and weight taxes will have to go up, both for the federal and state government." He further claimed that they not only threatened tax revenues, but were also highway hazards. Mackie's criticism's were rebuked by George W. Romney, then the president of American Motors Corporation and leading proponent of compact cars in the United States. Mackie also aggressively expanded the system of freeways and expressways in Michigan. During most of his administration, Michigan led the nation in construction of its Interstate Highway System and was the first to build a cross-state Interstate freeway (I-94) He was president of the American Association of State Highway Officials in 1963.

=== Congress ===
Mackie was elected as a Democrat from Michigan's 7th congressional district to the 89th United States Congress, serving from January 4, 1965, to January 3, 1967. He was known as one of the Michigan Five Fluke Freshmen and was defeated in 1966 by Donald W. Riegle, Jr., a Republican who eventually switched to the Democrats in 1973.

=== Later career and death ===
He was subsequently a business owner and a resident of Warrenton, Virginia. Mackie died on March 5, 2008, after an extended illness.

=== Legacy ===
The welcome center located on the median of US 127 and US 10 in Clare, Michigan, is named in his honor.

== Notes ==
U.S. House of Representatives
Preceded by James G. O'Hara	United States Representative for the 7th congressional district of Michigan; 1965–1967	Succeeded by Donald Riegle
