= Albert M. Todd =

American chemist and politician

Member of the U.S. House of Representatives from Michigan's 3rd district
- In office March 4, 1897 – March 3, 1899
- Preceded by: Alfred Milnes
- Succeeded by: Washington Gardner

Personal details
- Born: Albert May Todd; June 3, 1850 St. Joseph County, Michigan, U.S.
- Died: October 6, 1931 (aged 81) Kalamazoo, Michigan, U.S.
- Party: Democratic
- Spouse: Augusta Allman Todd
- Children: 5 Restingplace = Mountain Home Cemetery in Kalamazoo
- Education: Northwestern University

Albert May Todd (June 3, 1850 – October 6, 1931), known as "The Peppermint King of Kalamazoo," was an American chemist, businessman, and politician from the state of Michigan. A philanthropist and advocate of public ownership of utilities, Todd made his fortune as the founder of the A.M. Todd Company, a world leader in the production of peppermint oil and other botanical extracts. Todd was also a renowned bibliophile. Much of his large book collection is now scattered throughout the holdings of several American universities. He served one term in the United States House of Representatives from 1897 to 1899.

== Biography ==
=== Early years ===
Albert May Todd was born June 3, 1850, near Nottawa, Michigan, in St. Joseph County, the tenth and last child of Alfred and Mary Ann Hovey Todd, who had come to Michigan from upstate New York. The Todd family were farmers of extremely modest means, supporting themselves on 45 arable acres of an 80-acre homestead.

Todd received his primary education in one-room schoolhouses before attending and graduated from Sturgis High School in the neighboring town of Sturgis. He later studied chemistry at Northwestern University in Evanston, Illinois.

=== "The Peppermint King" ===
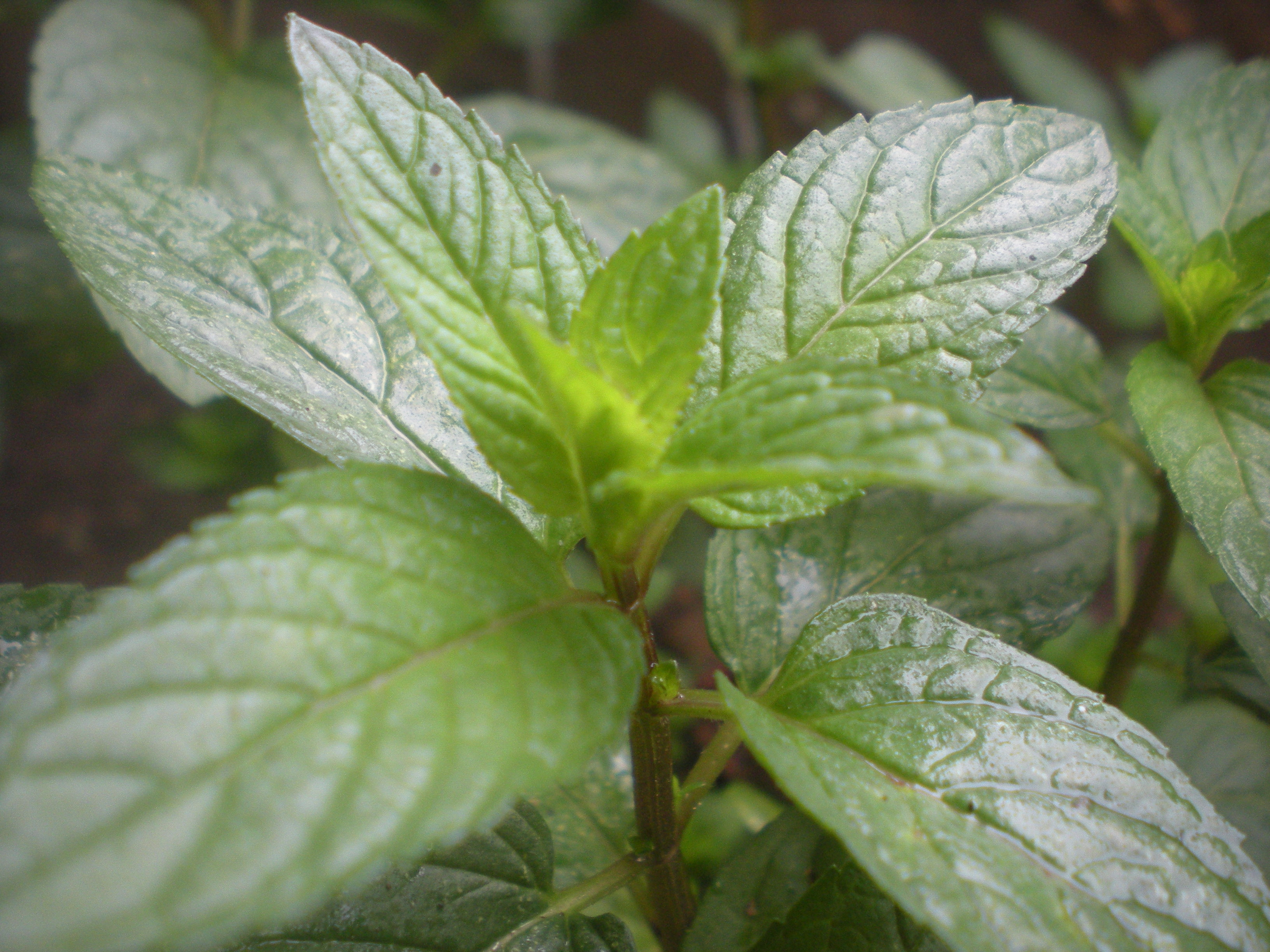
A peppermint plant.

Peppermint was an early agricultural staple in southern Michigan and Todd at an early age was fascinated by the crop, attempting to cultivate it and to distill it. Together with his brother Oliver, Albert Todd began growing mint on a small scale and working to invent and improve new methods for its distillation into peppermint oil — a process which remained crude at that date. After graduation from Northwestern, he traveled to Europe and made a study of mint cultivation on that continent, bringing home varieties of the plant which were in cultivation there.

Todd returned to southwestern Michigan where in 1869, at the age of 19, he established the A.M. Todd Company with a view to commercially extracting flavorings and essential oils from mint.

In 1875, he marketed the "Crystal White" brand of peppermint oil, with his own name featured prominently on the label as an assurance of quality. This trademarked product remains in active use into the 21st Century.

The A.M. Todd Company was moved to Kalamazoo in 1891. It is estimated that by the early 20th century, 90 percent of the world's supply of peppermint was grown within 75 miles of Kalamazoo, most of which was refined by Todd. Todd's predominance in this field earned him the popular moniker "The Peppermint King of Kalamazoo."

To provide a ready supply of raw mint for extraction, Todd established two gigantic plantations, called "Mentha" in Mentha, MI, which is now known as Pine Grove Township and "Campaignia" near Fennville. The latter was the largest mint plantation in the world at that time. In all the company would come to itself grow and harvest approximately 10,000 acres annually planted to peppermint, spearmint, and other aromatic herbs. Todd and his company developed scientific methods for testing various qualities of mint distillates which allowed a means of grading the oils and were leaders in developing disease resistant strains following the emergence of the fungal-borne verticillium wilt in 1924.

Todd returned to continue his education in the 1920s and in 1922 he graduated with a Master's degree with honors in Chemistry from the University of Michigan.

=== Political career ===
Pinback campaign button from Albert Todd's 1896 campaign for the U.S. House of Representatives.

Todd's father was a supporter of the Republican Party — during the 19th Century frequently the more liberal of the two old parties in the United States. Albert consequently cast his first vote for that political organization. The two parties began to realign in the late 1870s, however, with the Republicans coming to favor large commercial interests, high tariffs on imported goods, and strict adherence to the gold standard. Disheartened by the evolving political line of the Republican Party, Todd first shifted his allegiance to the Prohibition Party, an organization which advanced a broad reform platform beyond its desire to ban the manufacture and use of alcoholic beverages. He would remain a leading supporter of the Prohibition Party of Michigan for nearly 20 years, even running an unsuccessful campaign for Governor under that party's banner in 1894.

Todd won just under 19,000 votes in the 1894 Gubernatorial campaign, discouragingly finishing in fourth place behind the candidates of the Republican, Democratic, and People's parties. Still bitten by the political bug, Todd sought to run for Congress in a special election held in 1895 to fill a vacant Michigan seat — this time attempting to join forces between his Prohibition Party and the People's Party, with which he shared similar views on many issues. The Michigan legislature, dominated by Republicans, immediately passed legislation prohibiting such "fusion," a matter which was ultimately litigated and narrowly resolved in Todd's favor. Despite the legal victory, Todd was narrowly turned back at the polls in the 1895 campaign.

=== Congress ===
Undeterred, Todd again ran in the 1896 campaign for the 3rd Michigan Congressional District seat, winning the combined nominations of the Democratic, Prohibition, and People's Parties in the primary election. This time he would emerge victorious in November, defeating his Republican opponent by 425 votes. Todd's formal election was as a Democrat, with whom he caucused, but most of his time and effort was spent working with members and supporters of the People's Party and their agenda. Todd had since become a strong supporter of public ownership of utilities, the regulation of the railroads, an opponent of monopoly, and a loosening of the national money supply through the unlimited coinage of silver and worked on behalf of these issues as part of the Fifty-fifth Congress.

=== Defeat ===
Todd's days in Congress would prove to be limited, however, as in 1898 his bid for re-election would be narrowly defeated at the polls by an energized opposition in the predominantly Republican district. Todd dedicated his efforts to an effort to create a liberal state opposition party to the Republicans, sitting on the State Central Committee of the Michigan Union Silver Party in 1899.

=== Public utilities ===
Todd remained greatly interested in the question of public ownership of railways and utilities. He would travel to Europe in May 1912 and remain there for more than a year, visiting 13 countries to study their various approaches to the matter of public ownership and regulation of monopolies. He would attempt to propagate these ideas among the public through an organization which he established in 1916, the Public Ownership League of America — a group which he would serve as President and Honorary President until his death in 1931.

=== Collecting interests ===
Todd's travels in Europe also spurred a lifelong interest in collecting rare books and artwork. At the time of his death, he owned over 11,000 volumes, including illuminated manuscripts and clay tablets dating to the 23rd century B.C. His art collection included 228 paintings, sculptures, pottery and porcelain works from all over the world. His donations helped to establish the Kalamazoo Public Museum (now the Kalamazoo Valley Museum) in 1927.

He also established the A.M. Todd Rare Book Room at the Upjohn Library of Kalamazoo College. Later bequests to the library by Todd's surviving family members restored a significant part of Todd's original collection. Other artwork and manuscripts were placed in collections at Western Michigan University and the University of Michigan.

=== Death and legacy ===
Albert Todd died October 6, 1931, at his home in Kalamazoo. He was 81 years old at the time of his death. Todd was survived by his wife, Augusta Allman Todd, and five children. His body was interred at Mountain Home Cemetery in Kalamazoo.

The Todd family is regarded as a notable political family in the state of Michigan. Two of Albert M. Todd's sons — Albert J. Todd and Paul H. Todd — served as mayors of Kalamazoo. A grandson, Paul H. Todd, Jr., followed in his grandfather's footsteps and won a seat in the U.S. House of Representatives, in which he served from 1965 to 1966. In addition a nephew, Laurence Todd, was for 30 years the Washington correspondent of the TASS news agency of the Soviet Union, a position which twice put him in the national public spotlight as a subject of Congressional inquiry.

The A.M. Todd Company would remain in Kalamazoo and stand as a leader in the production of mint oil for more than a century, ultimately being sold in 2011 to Swiss flavoring giant Wild Flavors GmbH. Wild Flavors was in turn sold to Chicago-based agricultural behemoth Archer Daniels Midland in July 2014 for $3 billion.

== Works ==
- Federal Operation of Transportation Systems: Extracts from Hearings Before the Committee on Interstate and Foreign Commerce of the House of Representatives, Sixty-Fifth Congress, Second Session on H.R. 8172: Statement of Hon. Albert M. Todd, President of the Public Ownership League of America. Washington, DC: US Government Printing Office, 1918.
- Municipal Ownership, with a Special Survey of Municipal Gas Plants in America and Europe; Comprising a View of the General Principles of Public Ownership; Its Relation to the Public Welfare: with a Special Study of Gas Works in American and European Cities under Both Public and Private Ownership; a Comparison of Efficiency, Costs, and Rates of Charge; and the Influence of Public Ownership on General Prosperity, Good Government and Democracy. Chicago: Public Ownership League of America, 1918.
- Public Ownership of Railroads: Statement of Hon. Albert M. Todd, President of the Public Ownership League of America in the Hearings Before the Committee on Interstate Commerce, United States Senate, 65th Congress, Third Session, February 21, 1919. Washington, DC: US Government Printing Office, 1919.
- "Relation of Public Ownership to Democracy and Social Justice," Proceedings of the Academy of Political Science in the City of New York, vol. 8 (Jan. 1920), pp. 218–247.

U.S. House of Representatives
| Preceded by Alfred Milnes | United States Representative for the 3rd congressional district of Michigan; 1897 – 1899 | Succeeded by Washington Gardner |
