= Earl C. Michener =

American politician

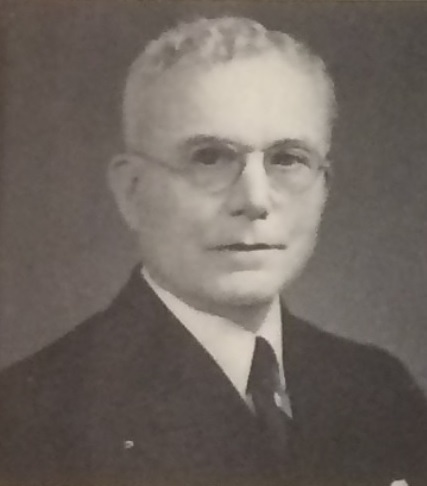
- From Pictorial Directory of the 81st Congress (1949)

Chair of the House Judiciary Committee
- In office January 3, 1947 – January 3, 1949
- Preceded by: Hatton W. Sumners
- Succeeded by: Emanuel Celler

Member of the U.S. House of Representatives from Michigan's 2nd district
- In office January 3, 1935 – January 3, 1951
- Preceded by: John C. Lehr
- Succeeded by: George Meader
- In office March 4, 1919 – March 3, 1933
- Preceded by: Samuel W. Beakes
- Succeeded by: John C. Lehr

Personal details
- Born: Earl Cory Michener; November 30, 1876 Attica, Ohio, U.S.
- Died: July 4, 1957 (aged 80) Adrian, Michigan, U.S.
- Resting place: Oakwood Cemetery; Adrian, Michigan
- Party: Republican
- Education: University of Michigan; George Washington University
- Profession: Lawyer

Military service
- Allegiance: United States
- Branch/service: United States Army
- Battles/wars: Spanish–American War

Earl Cory Michener (November 30, 1876 – July 4, 1957) was a politician from the U.S. state of Michigan.

Michener had German ancestry. He was born near Attica in Seneca County, Ohio. He moved with his parents to Adrian, Michigan, in 1889 and attended the public schools there. During the Spanish–American War, he served in the U.S. Army as a private in Company B, Thirty-first Regiment, Michigan Volunteer Infantry, from April 26, 1898, to May 17, 1899. He studied law at the University of Michigan at Ann Arbor in 1901 and 1902, and graduated from the law department of Columbian University (now George Washington University), Washington, D.C., in 1903 where he was a member of Phi Sigma Kappa fraternity. He was admitted to the bar the same year and commenced practice in Adrian. He served as assistant prosecuting attorney for Lenawee County from 1907 to 1910 and prosecuting attorney from 1911 to 1914.

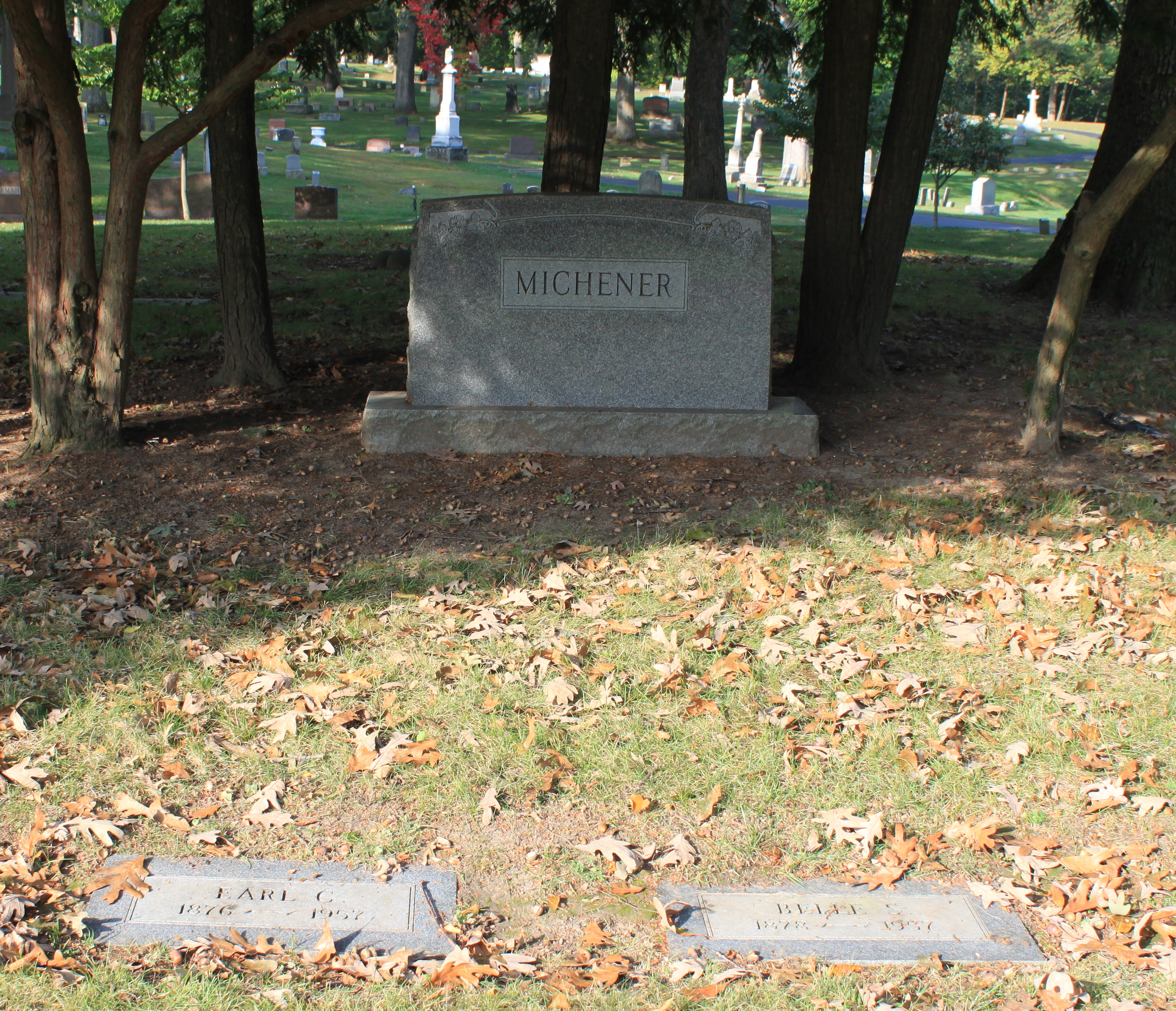
Michener grave

In 1918, Michener defeated incumbent Democrat Samuel W. Beakes to be elected as a Republican from Michigan's 2nd congressional district to the 69th United States Congress. He was subsequently re-elected to the following six Congresses, serving from March 4, 1919, to March 3, 1933. In 1926, he was one of the managers appointed by the House of Representatives to conduct the impeachment proceedings against George W. English, judge of the United States District Court for the Eastern District of Illinois.

Michener was an unsuccessful candidate for reelection in 1932, losing to Democrat John C. Lehr. Two years later he defeated Lehr, to be elected to 74th Congress and was subsequently re-elected to the seven succeeding Congresses, serving from January 3, 1935, to January 3, 1951. He served as chairman of the Committee on the Judiciary in the 80th Congress, and introduced the resolution that ultimately became the Twenty-second Amendment. He was not a candidate for re-election in 1950.

Earl C. Michener maintained law offices in Adrian, until his death there. He was interred in Oakwood Cemetery.

U.S. House of Representatives
Preceded by Samuel Beakes	United States Representative for the 2nd congressional district of Michigan; 1919–1933	Succeeded by John C. Lehr
Preceded by John C. Lehr	United States Representative for the 2nd congressional district of Michigan; 1935–1951	Succeeded by George Meader
