= Donald Riegle =

American politician (1938–2026)

Don Riegle
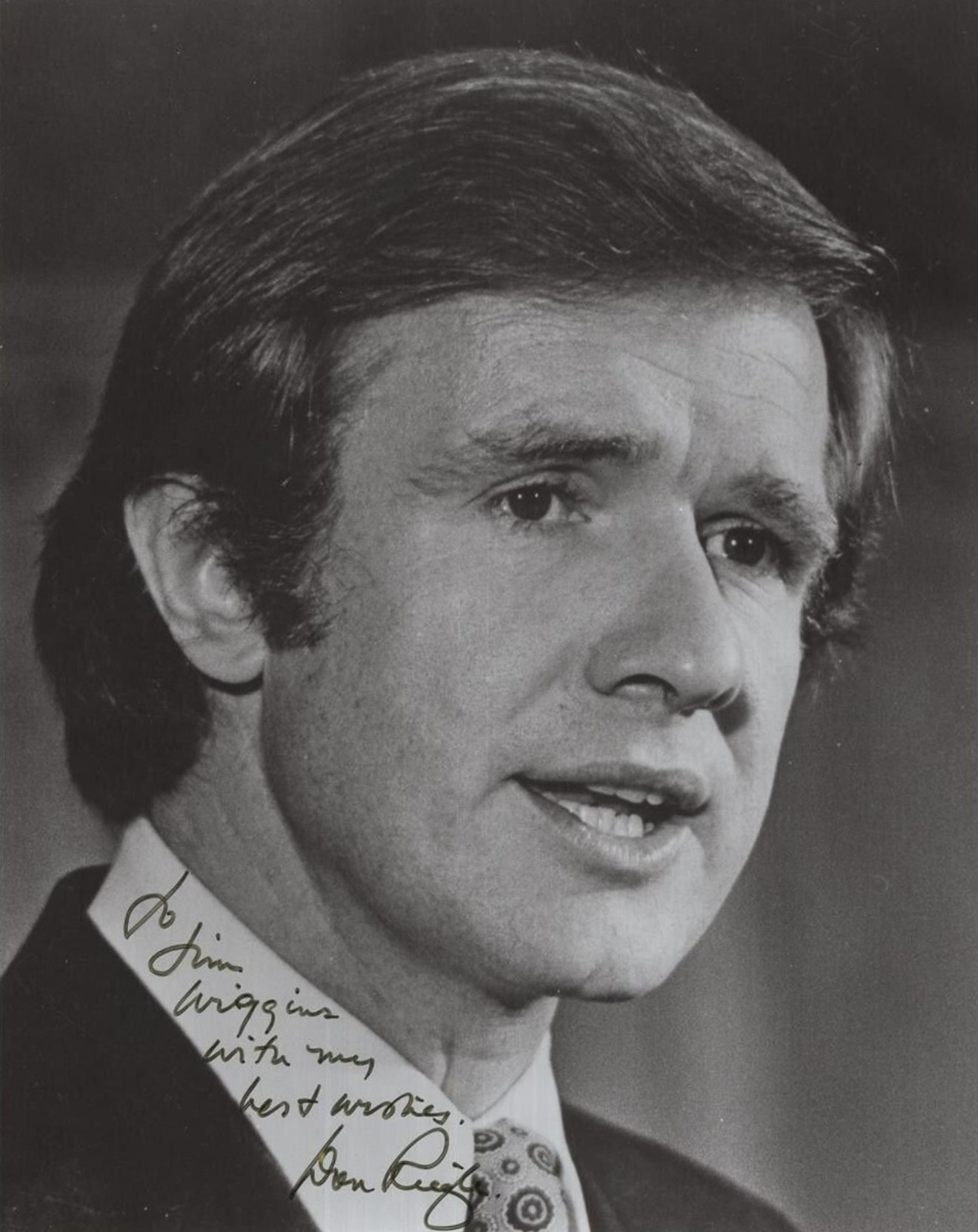

Chair of the Senate Banking Committee
- In office January 3, 1989 – January 3, 1995
- Preceded by: William Proxmire
- Succeeded by: Al D'Amato

United States Senator from Michigan
- In office December 30, 1976 – January 3, 1995
- Preceded by: Philip Hart
- Succeeded by: Spencer Abraham

Member of the U.S. House of Representatives from Michigan's 7th district
- In office January 3, 1967 – December 30, 1976
- Preceded by: John C. Mackie
- Succeeded by: Dale Kildee

Personal details
- Born: Donald Wayne Riegle Jr. February 4, 1938 Flint, Michigan, U.S.
- Died: April 24, 2026 (aged 88) San Diego, California, U.S.
- Party: Republican (before 1973); Democratic (1973–2026)
- Spouses: Nancy Brandt (m. 1957; div. 1971) Lori Hansen (m. 1978)
- Children: 5
- Relatives: Donald W. Riegle Sr. (father)
- Education: Mott Community College (attended); Western Michigan University (attended); University of Michigan, Flint (BA); Michigan State University (MBA); Harvard University (attended)

Donald Wayne Riegle Jr. (/ˈriːɡəl/ REE-gəl; February 4, 1938 – April 24, 2026) was an American politician, author, and businessman from Michigan. He served for five terms as a representative and for three terms as a senator in the U.S. Congress.

== Early life and education ==
Donald Wayne Riegle Jr. was born on February 4, 1938, in Flint, Michigan, to Donald Wayne Riegle Sr., son of John Louis Riegle, owner of the Riegle Press and future mayor of Flint, and Dorothy Grace Riegle (née Fitchett). He was a graduate of Flint Central High School

Riegle attended Flint Junior College (now Mott Community College) and Western Michigan University, graduated with a bachelor's degree in business administration and economics from the University of Michigan–Flint in 1960, and received an MBA in finance from Michigan State University in 1961. Riegle was employed by IBM as a financial analyst from 1961 to 1964. Between 1964 and 1966, he completed required course work for doctoral studies in business and government relations at Harvard Business School before he left to run for Congress. Riegle taught at Michigan State University, Boston University, the University of Southern California, and Harvard University.

== Political life ==
=== U.S. Representative ===
In 1966, Richard Nixon persuaded Riegle to return to Michigan to run for Congress. Riegle was then 28 years old and considered to be a moderate-to-liberal Republican. Nixon attended an early campaign fundraiser, and talked up Riegle's prospects to reporters.

Riegle defeated incumbent Democratic U.S. Representative John C. Mackie in an upset, to be elected from Michigan's 7th congressional district to the 90th Congress. Mackie was one of the Michigan Five Fluke Freshmen who lost their seats after a single term.

In 1973, Riegle changed party affiliation to become a Democrat because of differences with Nixon regarding the Vietnam War, civil rights and other issues.

In 1973, Riegle was one of the co-sponsors of H.R. 8163, a bill to prevent discrimination on the basis of sex or marital status in the granting of credit, also known as the Equal Credit Opportunity Act. Sponsored by Congresswoman Bella Abzug, the Equal Credit Opportunity Act was passed by the House and the Senate in 1974 and was signed into law by President Gerald Ford on October 28, 1974.

In 1972, Riegle authored a best-selling book, O Congress (LCCN 71-182842), with Trevor Armbrister. The book provides an inside look at the workings of Congress, Riegle's opposition to the Vietnam War, and his break with the Nixon White House.

=== U.S. Senator ===
Riegle did not run for reelection to the House in 1976, but announced his candidacy for the U.S. Senate to succeed retiring Senator Philip Hart and defeated Secretary of State Richard H. Austin and fellow Congressman James G. O'Hara in the Democratic primary. He defeated Republican Congressman Marvin L. Esch in the general election. On December 30, 1976, before Riegle's term was set to begin, he was appointed early by Governor William Milliken due to the death of Senator Hart for the term ending January 3, 1977. He was reelected in 1982 and 1988. Riegle's 1988 election was the largest Democratic margin of victory in the state's history until being surpassed by Carl Levin's election victory in 2008. Riegle did not seek re-election in 1994.

He served as chairman of the Senate Committee on Banking, Housing, and Urban Affairs from 1989 to 1995. Riegle also served on the Senate Finance Committee, where he served as Chairman of the Subcommittee on Health for Families and the Uninsured; the Senate Committee on Labor and Human Resources, where he served as Chairman of the Subcommittee on Alcoholism and Drug Abuse; the Senate Committee on Commerce, Science and Transportation, where he served as the Chairman of the Subcommittee on Science and Space; and was a member of the Senate Committee on Budget from 1979 to 1995.

In the area of banking reform, Riegle led the efforts to enact the Federal Deposit Insurance Corporation Improvement Act of 1991 (FDICIA), which preserved the ability of the Federal Deposit Insurance Corporation (FDIC) to protect depositors and reformed the way banks are run and regulated. The FDICIA also restricted the "too big to fail policy", strengthened regulation of foreign banks in the U.S., and expanded disclosure requirements for banks to consumers.

Riegle also led the effort to create a system of community development banks. The Riegle Community Development and Regulatory Improvement Act of 1994 established the Community Development Financial Institutions Fund to seed and support financial institutions dedicated to supporting community development. The legislation also provided increased consumer protections for high rate home equity loans, contained measures to increase credit availability to small businesses, streamline the regulation of depository institutions, and reform the National Flood Insurance Program.

The Riegle–Neal Interstate Banking and Branching Efficiency Act of 1994 eliminated restrictions on interstate banking by permitting bank holding companies to acquire banks in any state, permitted banks to merge across state lines unless states opt-out, and reduced the competitive advantages that foreign banks had in the U.S. market over U.S. banks.

In 1994, Riegle led an investigation of the illnesses being experienced by veterans of the Gulf War, using the jurisdiction of the Senate Banking Committee over "dual use" exports—materials and technology that could be converted to military use. The resulting investigative report to the Senate detailed at least three occasions on which U.S. military forces came into contact with chemical warfare agents that may have led to the development of Gulf War syndrome and that at least some of those biological agents (weapons of mass destruction) had been provided to Saddam Hussein by the U.S. Commonly referred to as the Riegle Report to the U.S. Senate, the report called for further government investigation and recourse for war veterans suffering from Gulf War syndrome.

In his first action as Chairman of the Senate Banking Committee, Riegle led the efforts to reform the savings and loan industry, which resulted in the Financial Institutions Recovery, Reform, and Enforcement Act of 1989 (FIRREA). The toughest financial reform bill in 50 years, the FIRREA ended the abuses and reformed the savings and loan industry. The FIRREA put controls on state-chartered thrifts, stopped excessive risk taking by savings and loans, limited brokered deposits, banned junk bond investments, and set new capital requirements for savings and loans.

Riegle was one of the Keating Five, a group of senators who in 1989 were accused of improperly intervening in 1987 on behalf of Charles Keating, chairman of the Lincoln Savings and Loan Association, which was the target of a regulatory investigation by the Federal Home Loan Bank Board (FHLBB). The FHLBB subsequently backed off taking action against Lincoln. Along with other members of the Keating Five, Riegle was never charged with any actual crime in connection with his involvement, but was criticized for having acted improperly.

== Later life ==
In 1995, Riegle joined Shandwick Public Affairs, in Washington, D.C. There, he was instrumental in building the company's government affairs practice and played an important part in the procurement of Powell Tate, a government affairs firm that is now owned by Weber Shandwick and still operating in Washington D.C., under its independent brand. As the company grew, he took on more responsibility and eventually served as deputy chairman. He joined public relations firm APCO Worldwide in 2001, as chairman of government relations in Washington, D.C.

He endorsed Bernie Sanders for the Democratic nomination for President of the United States in both 2016 and 2020.

== Personal life and death ==
Riegle was married three times. He was married to Nancy Brandt from 1957 to 1971. He was married to Meredith White, the niece of U.S. Supreme Court Justice Byron White, from 1972 to 1977. Both marriages ended in divorce. In 1978, he married Lori Hansen, a U.S. Senate staffer and Social Security policy specialist. They remained married for 48 years until his passing.

Riegle died from cardiac arrest at his home in San Diego, on April 24, 2026, at the age of 88.

== See also ==
- List of American politicians who switched parties in office
- List of United States representatives who switched parties

U.S. House of Representatives
Preceded by John C. Mackie	Member of the U.S. House of Representatives from Michigan's 7th congressional district 1967–1976	Succeeded by Dale Kildee
Party political offices
Preceded by Philip Hart	Democratic nominee for U.S. Senator from Michigan (Class 1); 1976, 1982, 1988	Succeeded by Milton Robert Carr
Vacant Title last held by Ted Stevens; John Rhodes	Response to the State of the Union address 1982; Served alongside: Robert Byrd, Alan Cranston, Al Gore, Gary Hart, Bennett Johnston, Ted Kennedy, Tip O'Neill, Paul Sarbanes, Jim Sasser	Succeeded by Les AuCoin, Joe Biden, Bill Bradley, Robert Byrd, Tom Daschle, Bill Hefner, Barbara B. Kennelly, George Miller, Tip O'Neill, Paul Tsongas, Tim Wirth
U.S. Senate
Preceded by Philip Hart	U.S. Senator (Class 1) from Michigan; 1976–1995; Served alongside: Robert P. Griffin, Carl Levin	Succeeded by Spencer Abraham
Preceded by Harrison A. Williams	Ranking Member of the Senate Banking Committee; 1982–1983	Succeeded by William Proxmire
Preceded by William Proxmire	Chair of the Senate Banking Committee; 1989–1995	Succeeded by Al D'Amato
