= Garry E. Brown =

American politician (1923–1998)

Garry Brown
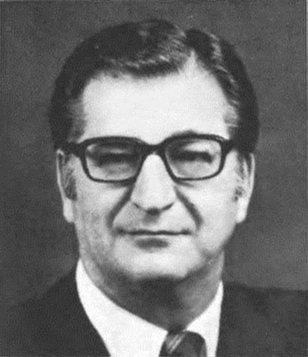

Member of the U.S. House of Representatives from Michigan's 3rd district
- In office January 3, 1967 – January 3, 1979
- Preceded by: Paul H. Todd Jr.
- Succeeded by: Howard Wolpe

Member of the Michigan Senate
- In office 1963–1966
- Preceded by: Carlton H. Morris
- Succeeded by: Anthony Stamm
- Constituency: 6th district (1963-1964); 21st district (1965-1966)

Personal details
- Born: August 12, 1923 Schoolcraft, Michigan
- Died: August 27, 1998 (aged 75) Washington, D.C.
- Party: Republican
- Spouse: Frances E. Wilkins (m. 1955)
- Children: 4 (Frances, Mollie, Amelia, Abigail)
- Education: Kalamazoo College (1951); George Washington University Law School (1954)
- Occupation: Lawyer

Military service
- Branch/service: United States Army
- Rank: Lieutenant
- Unit: 24th Infantry Regiment
- Battles/wars: World War II

Garry Eldridge Brown (August 12, 1923 – August 27, 1998) was a politician from the U.S. state of Michigan. He served six terms in the United States House of Representatives from 1967 to 1979.

== Biography ==
Brown was born in Schoolcraft, Michigan on August 12, 1923 to a family with a political background in Michigan. His great-grandfather, Ebenezer Lakin Brown, and his grandfather, Addison Makepeace Brown, both served in the Michigan State Legislature.

During World War II, Brown served in the Twenty-fourth Infantry Regiment of the United States Army as second lieutenant in Japan. After the war, he worked for the FBI, under Hoover, before earning a B.A. from Kalamazoo College in 1951 and a LL.B from George Washington University Law School in 1954. He was admitted to the bar in 1954 and commenced practice in Kalamazoo. He was commissioner of the United States District Court for the Western District of Michigan from 1957 to 1962 and was a delegate to the Michigan constitutional convention of 1961-1962.

== Political career ==
He served two terms in the Michigan State Senate from 1963 to 1966, where he was minority floor leader and chairman of the Republican senate policy committee. He represented the 6th district from 1963 to 1964 and the 21st district from 1965 to 1966.

In 1966, Brown defeated incumbent Democrat Paul H. Todd, Jr., one of the "Five Fluke Freshmen", to be elected as a Republican to the U.S. House of Representatives from Michigan's 3rd congressional district for the Ninetieth and to the five succeeding Congresses, serving from January 3, 1967 to January 3, 1979.

Brown took the lead in October 1972 in obstructing the efforts of Rep. Wright Patman, D-TX, to have the House Banking and Currency Committee investigate the flow of illegal campaign funds to the Watergate burglars. By July 1973, with the scheme unraveling in the courts and in televised Senate hearings, Brown was admitting he had been wrong to do so.

He was an unsuccessful candidate for reelection in 1978, losing to Democrat Howard E. Wolpe.

== Personal life ==
He resumed the practice of law and was a resident of Washington, D.C. until his death.

Garry Brown married Frances Wilkins in 1955, together they had four daughters, Frances, Mollie, Amelia, and Abigail. His family owned and operated a dairy farm while he was growing up in Schoolcraft, Michigan. They were one of the first to settle there, and his family still owns the original property that the Browns settled on in the 1830s.

== Death ==
Brown died on August 27, 1998 in Washington, D.C. and was laid to rest in Schoolcraft, Michigan.

U.S. House of Representatives
Preceded by Paul H. Todd, Jr.	United States Representative for the 3rd congressional district of Michigan; 1967 – 1979	Succeeded by Howard Wolpe
