= Paul H. Todd Jr. =

American politician

Paul Todd
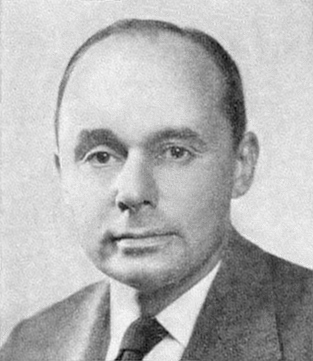

Member of the U.S. House of Representatives from Michigan's 3rd district
- In office January 3, 1965 – January 3, 1967
- Preceded by: August E. Johansen
- Succeeded by: Garry E. Brown

Personal details
- Born: Paul Harold Todd Jr. September 22, 1921 Kalamazoo, Michigan, U.S.
- Died: November 18, 2008 (aged 87)
- Spouses: Terry Todd (m. 1946; died 1997) Caroline Ham (m. 2004)
- Relations: Albert M. Todd (grandfather)
- Children: 4
- Education: Cornell University (BS)

Military service
- Branch/service: United States Army
- Unit: Signal Corps; Office of Strategic Services
- Battles/wars: World War II

Paul Harold Todd Jr. (September 22, 1921 – November 18, 2008) was an American politician, soldier, and business executive from the U.S. state of Michigan. He served one term in the U.S. House of Representatives from 1965 to 1967.

== Early life and education ==
Todd was born in Kalamazoo, Michigan, the son of Paul H. Todd, mayor of Kalamazoo in 1937, and the grandson of Albert M. Todd, former U.S. representative and the "Peppermint King" founder of the A.M. Todd Company. Todd graduated from Beverly Hills High School in 1937. He received a B.S. from Cornell University in 1943.

== Career ==
=== Military career ===
Todd served in the United States Army Signal Corps and the Office of Strategic Services from 1942 to 1945. He received a bronze star for his service during World War II. He was founder of Kalamazoo Spice Extraction Co. (now known as Kalsec) in 1958.

=== Congress ===
In 1962, he unsuccessfully challenged incumbent Republican U.S. Representative August E. Johansen in Michigan's 3rd congressional district. In 1964, Todd defeated Johansen to be elected as a Democrat to the 89th Congress, serving from January 3, 1965, to January 3, 1967. He was known as one of the Michigan Five Fluke Freshmen and in 1966, lost in the general election to Republican Garry E. Brown.

=== Later career ===
Todd later was chief executive officer of Planned Parenthood from 1967 to 1970. He was appointed to the Governor's Commission on Ethics and served from 1972 to 1976. He was an unsuccessful candidate for election to the 94th Congress in 1974. He is a former chair of the Board of Directors of Pathfinder International.

== Personal life ==
Before his death on November 18, 2008, Todd resided in Kalamazoo, Michigan. Todd was married to Terry for 51 years and together they had four children. Terry preceded him in death in 1997. Todd married Caroline Hamm, a former Kalamazoo mayor, in 2004.
