= John C. Lehr =

American politician

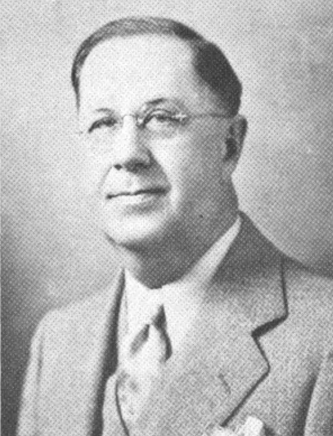
- The Michigan Alumnus magazine, May 10, 1941

Member of the U.S. House of Representatives from Michigan's 2nd district
- In office March 4, 1933 – January 3, 1935
- Preceded by: Earl C. Michener
- Succeeded by: Earl C. Michener

Personal details
- Born: November 18, 1878 Monroe, Michigan, U.S.
- Died: February 17, 1958 (aged 79) Monroe, Michigan, U.S.
- Party: Democratic
- Education: University of Michigan at Ann Arbor
- Occupation: Lawyer

John Camillus Lehr (November 18, 1878 – February 17, 1958) was a politician from the U.S. state of Michigan.

Lehr was born in Monroe, Michigan and attended St. Mary's private school and graduated from Monroe High School in 1897. He graduated from the law department of the University of Michigan at Ann Arbor in 1900. He was admitted to the bar the same year and commenced practice in Monroe. He moved to Port Huron in 1905 and continued the practice of law there. He later returned to Monroe in 1916 and served as city attorney from 1918 to 1922 and 1928 to 1930. He was a member of the board of education of Monroe 1926 to 1936 and served as its vice president from 1930 to 1936.

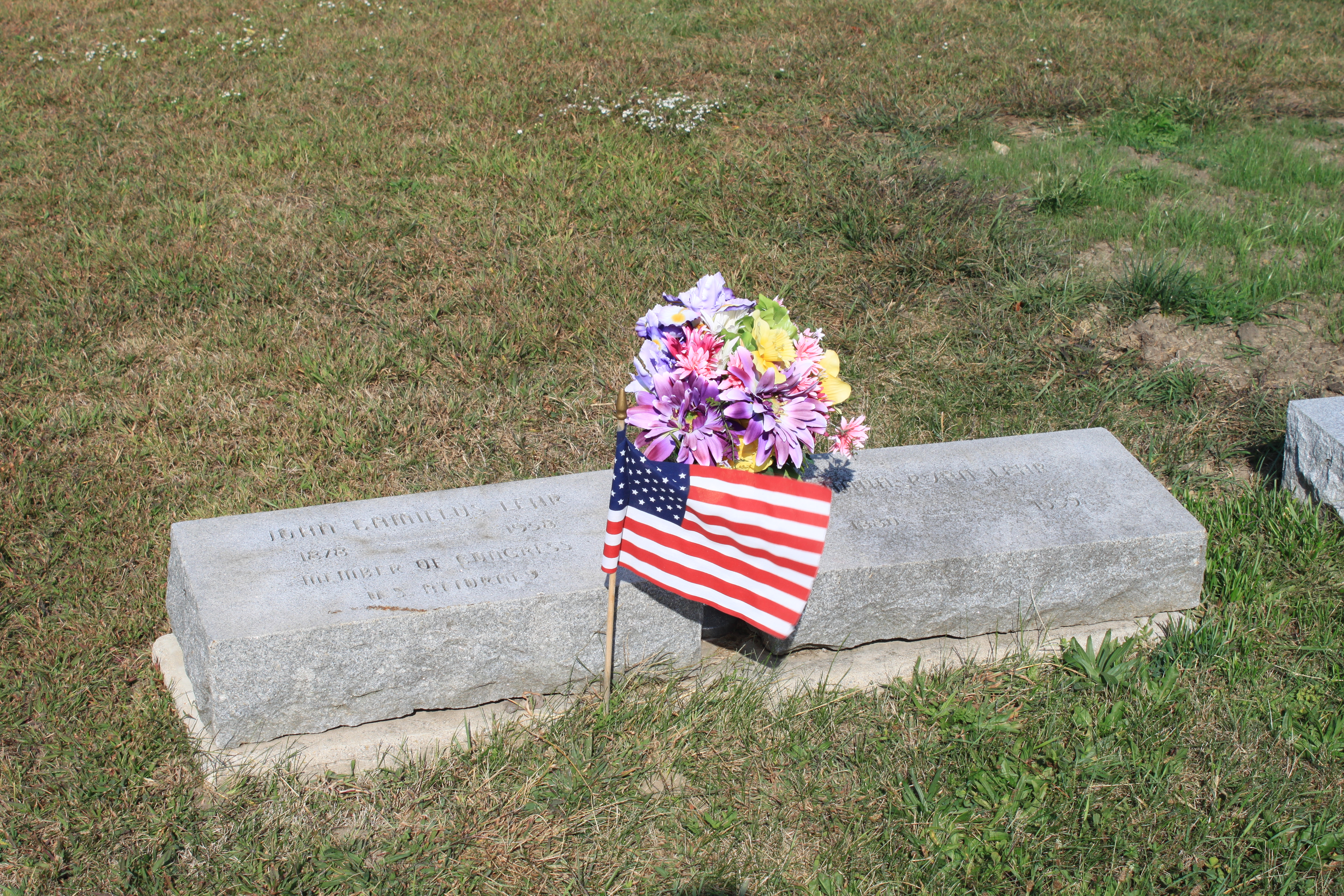
Lehr grave

In 1932, Lehr defeated seven-term Republican Earl C. Michener to be elected as a Democrat from Michigan's 2nd congressional district to the 73rd United States Congress, serving from March 4, 1933 to January 3, 1935. He was defeated by Michener in 1934.

Lehr was a delegate to the 1936 Democratic National Convention and was a member of the Monroe Port Commission from 1936 to 1942. On July 2, 1936, he was appointed by President Franklin D. Roosevelt to be United States Attorney for the Eastern District of Michigan and served in that position until September 2, 1947. He resigned to devote his time as head of a fraternal beneficiary association in Detroit (The Maccabees), and was succeeded by his chief assistant Thomas P. Thornton.

John C. Lehr died in Monroe and was interred there in St. Joseph Cemetery.

U.S. House of Representatives
Preceded by Earl C. Michener	United States Representative for the 2nd congressional district of Michigan; 1933–1935	Succeeded by Earl C. Michener
