= Bob Davis (Michigan politician) =

American politician and lobbyist

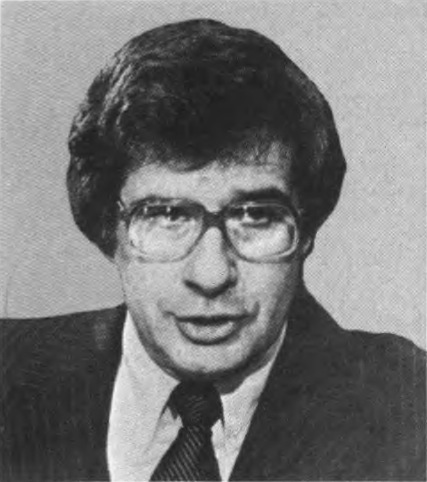

Member of the U.S. House of Representatives from Michigan's 11th district
- In office January 3, 1979 – January 3, 1993
- Preceded by: Philip Ruppe
- Succeeded by: Bart Stupak (redistricting)

Member of the Michigan Senate from the 37th district
- In office January 1, 1971 – December 31, 1978
- Preceded by: Thomas F. Schweigert
- Succeeded by: Mitch Irwin

Member of the Michigan House of Representatives from the 106th district
- In office January 1, 1967 – December 31, 1970
- Preceded by: Clayton T. Morrison
- Succeeded by: Richard Friske

Personal details
- Born: Robert William Davis; July 31, 1932 Marquette, Michigan, U.S.
- Died: October 16, 2009 (aged 77) Arlington, Virginia, U.S.
- Party: Republican
- Education: Northern Michigan University; Hillsdale College
- Occupation: Politician; funeral director; lobbyist

Robert William Davis (July 31, 1932 – October 16, 2009) was an American politician from the state of Michigan. He represented the state's 11th congressional district, which at that time included the Upper Peninsula and a large portion of Northern Michigan, in the United States House of Representatives from 1979 until 1993.

== Early life ==
Davis was born in Marquette, Michigan. His family moved to St. Ignace soon after his birth, where he attended public schools. He graduated from LaSalle High School in 1950. He attended Northern Michigan University, Hillsdale College, and the College of Mortuary Sciences at Wayne State University. Before entering politics, Davis served as Funeral Director at the Davis Funeral Home in St. Ignace.

== Political career ==
In 1966, Davis was elected as a Republican to the Michigan House of Representatives from the state's 106th District and was reelected in 1968. In 1970, Davis was elected to the Michigan State Senate from the 37th district and was reelected in 1974. He served as the Majority Whip, 1970–1974, and as Senate Republican Leader, 1974–1978. In 1978, Davis was elected to the 96th United States Congress and was subsequently re-elected to the six succeeding Congresses. Davis did not seek re-election in 1992. In Congress, Davis helped establish the Thunder Bay National Marine Sanctuary and the Keweenaw National Historical Park.

In early 1992, Davis was implicated in the House banking scandal or congressional check-kiting scandal. The Congress ran its own bank and allowed members who wished to do so to frequently write overdrawn or insufficient fund checks to their account. Davis was one of the most notorious of these, writing many overdrawn checks. There was no illegality, though, since the bank allowed members overdraft protection.

For the elections of 1992, after redistricting due to the 1990 census, most of what had been 11th congressional district became Michigan's 1st congressional district, while the 11th district was apportioned to represent a part of the Metro Detroit area. In 1992, Democrat Bart Stupak was elected from 1st district, succeeding Davis as the U.S. representative for the U.P. and Northern Michigan. Stupak, coincidentally, defeated Philip Ruppe, the man Davis replaced as congressman in 1978. Davis lived in Gaylord, Michigan.

== Post-Congressional career and life ==
He became a lobbyist for K&L Gates. He was active in the Bush campaign, having served on the Michigan Bush Committee, and was a friend and former colleague of Vice President Dick Cheney.

According to the Chicago Sun-Times of May 31, 1989, Davis revealed that he hired a woman with whom he lived for his committee staff, but he said he had not violated House rules. He acknowledged recommending that Brook Ball, 27 years old and 29 years his junior, be hired for the House Merchant Marine staff. However, in 1987 Davis was still married to his third wife, DC-based network radio and TV news anchor/journalist Marty Davis, whom he married in 1976. The couple divorced in 1989. He married Ball in 1992, who survives him, as do his four children.

Davis died at a hospice in Arlington, Virginia, at age 77 of heart and kidney failure. Robert is interred at Protestant Cemetery, Mackinac Island, Michigan, USA.

U.S. House of Representatives
Preceded by Philip Ruppe	United States Representative for the 11th congressional district of Michigan; 1979–1993	Succeeded by Bart Stupak
