= Raymond F. Clevenger =

American politician (1926–2016)

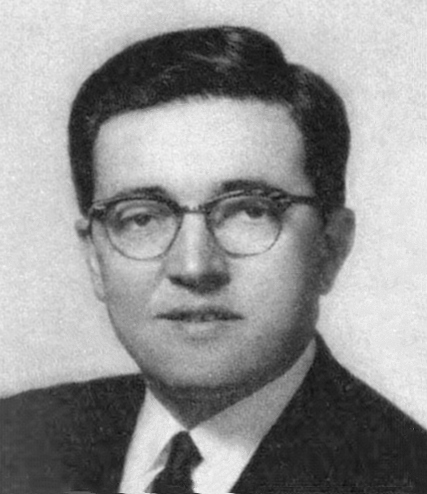

Member of the U.S. House of Representatives from Michigan's 11th district
- In office January 3, 1965 – January 3, 1967
- Preceded by: Victor A. Knox
- Succeeded by: Philip Ruppe

Personal details
- Born: Raymond Francis Clevenger; June 6, 1926 Chicago, Illinois, U.S.
- Died: March 29, 2016 (aged 89) Ann Arbor, Michigan, U.S.
- Party: Democratic
- Education: Roosevelt University; University of Michigan Law School
- Occupation: Attorney

Raymond Francis Clevenger (June 6, 1926 – March 29, 2016) was an American lawyer and politician who served one term as a U.S. representative from the state of Michigan between 1965 and 1967.

== Biography ==
Clevenger was born in Chicago and attended schools in Oak Park, Illinois, graduating from high school in 1944. He served in the United States Army Medical Corps from July 1944 to July 1946. He resumed his education and attended Roosevelt University in Chicago and the London School of Economics and Political Science. While at Roosevelt, he was elected student council president, and served alongside future Chicago mayor Harold Washington, who was the student council vice president. He graduated from Roosevelt University in 1949 and from the University of Michigan Law School in 1952.

=== Career ===
He began the practice of law in Sault Ste. Marie, Michigan in 1953. He was a delegate to Democratic State Conventions, 1954–1964 and a delegate to the 1956 Democratic National Convention. He practiced law in Illinois, as well as Michigan, and before the United States federal courts and served as Chippewa County Circuit Court Commissioner from 1958 to 1960. He was a member of the Democratic State Central Committee, 1958–1960. He was also Michigan Corporation and Securities Commissioner from 1961 to 1963.

=== Congress ===
In 1964, he defeated incumbent Republican Victor A. Knox to be elected as a Democrat from Michigan's 11th congressional district to the Eighty-ninth Congress, serving from January 3, 1965, to January 3, 1967. He was known as one of the Michigan Five Fluke Freshmen and was an unsuccessful candidate for reelection in 1966, and again in 1968, losing both times to Republican Philip Ruppe.

=== Later career and death ===
Clevenger was appointed by U.S. President Lyndon B. Johnson as chairman of the Great Lakes Basin Commission, serving from 1967 to 1968. He later resumed the practice of law and campaigned in 1989 for Mayor of Ann Arbor, Michigan, losing to Republican incumbent Gerald D. Jernigan.

He resided in Ann Arbor and died in March 2016 at the age of 89.

U.S. House of Representatives
Preceded by Victor A. Knox	United States Representative for the 11th congressional district of Michigan; 1965–1967	Succeeded by Philip E. Ruppe
