= Victor A. Knox =

American politician (1899–1976)

The Honorable Victor A. Knox
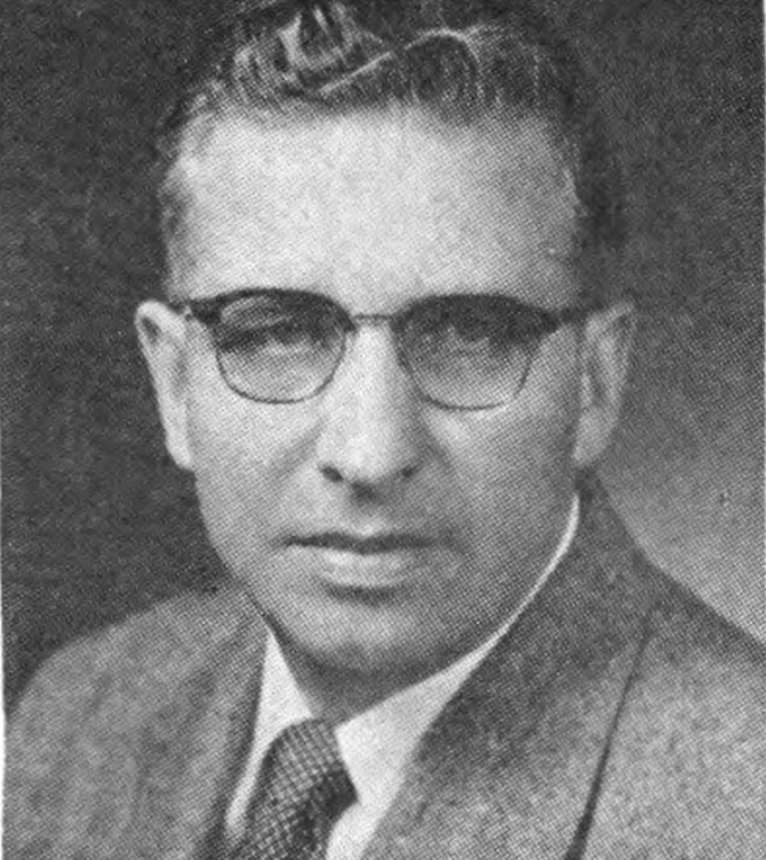

Member of the U.S. House of Representatives from Michigan's 11th district
- In office January 3, 1953 – January 3, 1965
- Preceded by: Charles E. Potter
- Succeeded by: Raymond F. Clevenger

53rd Speaker of the Michigan House of Representatives
- In office 1947–1952
- Governor: Kim Sigler; G. Mennen Williams
- Preceded by: Howard Nugent
- Succeeded by: Wade Van Valkenburg

Member of the Michigan House of Representatives from the Chippewa County district
- In office January 1, 1937 – December 31, 1952

Personal details
- Born: Victor Alfred Knox; January 13, 1899 Chippewa County, Michigan, US
- Died: December 31, 1976 (aged 77) Petoskey, Michigan, US
- Resting place: Oaklawn Chapel Gardens, Sault Ste. Marie, Michigan
- Party: Republican
- Spouse: Bertha

Victor Alfred Knox (January 13, 1899 – December 13, 1976) was a politician from the U.S. state of Michigan. He served six terms in the United States House of Representatives from 1953 to 1965.

== Early life and education ==
Knox was born on a farm in Chippewa County, Michigan, near Sault Ste. Marie; his father was from Canada. He attended the public schools and engaged in farming until 1943. He was the treasurer of Soo Township in 1923 and 1924, and Chippewa County supervisor, 1925-1931. Knox was member of the Michigan House of Representatives, 1937–1952, serving as the speaker pro tempore and Republican floor leader, 1943–1946, and as speaker, 1947-1952. He was also the manager of the Chippewa County Farm Bureau, 1943–1946 and engaged in the retail plumbing and heating business in Sault Ste. Marie in 1946. He served on the Council of State Government, the State Planning Commission, the State Crime Commission, and the Soo Locks Centennial Commission.

== Congress ==
Knox was elected as a Republican from Michigan's 11th congressional district to the 83rd United States Congress and to the five succeeding Congresses, serving from January 3, 1953 to January 3, 1965. Knox voted in favor of the Civil Rights Acts of 1957 and 1960, but voted against the Civil Rights Act of 1964, as well as the 24th Amendment to the U.S. Constitution. He was an unsuccessful candidate for reelection in 1964, losing in the general election to Democrat Raymond F. Clevenger.

== Death ==
Knox died in Petoskey, Michigan and is interred at Oaklawn Chapel Gardens, fifteen miles south of Sault Ste. Marie.

U.S. House of Representatives
Preceded by Charles E. Potter	United States Representative for the 11th congressional district of Michigan; 1953–1965	Succeeded by Raymond F. Clevenger
