= August E. Johansen =

American politician (1905–1995)

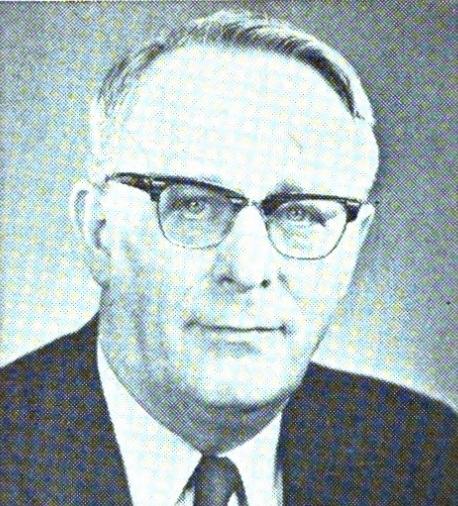
- From 1963's Pocket Congressional Directory of the Eighty-Eighty Congress

Member of the U.S. House of Representatives from Michigan's 3rd district
- In office January 3, 1955 – January 3, 1965
- Preceded by: Paul W. Shafer
- Succeeded by: Paul H. Todd Jr.

Personal details
- Born: July 21, 1905 Philadelphia, Pennsylvania, U.S.
- Died: April 16, 1995 (aged 89) Orlando, Florida, U.S.
- Party: Republican
- Education: Olivet College; Western Michigan College of Education; University of Chicago

August Edgar Johansen (July 21, 1905 – April 16, 1995) was a politician from the U.S. state of Michigan.

== Biography ==
Johansen was born in Philadelphia, Pennsylvania, and attended the public schools in Battle Creek, Michigan. He attended Olivet College in 1922 and 1923, and Western Michigan College of Education in Kalamazoo in 1923 and 1924. He graduated from the University of Chicago in 1926.

Johansen was a reporter with the Battle Creek Moon-Journal during the summers from 1922 to 1927. He served as minister of the Seventh Day Baptist Church in Chicago, Illinois, and Congregational Church in Bedford, Michigan, from 1924 to 1934. He was also manager of industrial relations of Kellogg Company in Battle Creek, from 1934 to 1944. He was an editorial writer for the Battle Creek Enquirer-News from 1944 to 1948, editor of the Lakeview News, and news editor on radio from 1944 to 1951. He was a member of the Calhoun County Tax Allocation Board in 1949 and 1950 and served as administrative assistant to U.S. Representative Paul W. Shafer from 1951 to 1954.

In 1954, after Shafer's death just two weeks after being nominated unopposed in the Republican Party primary election for Michigan's 3rd congressional district, Johansen was elected to replace Shafer in the 84th United States Congress. Johansen was subsequently re-elected to the next four Congresses, serving from January 3, 1955, to January 3, 1965. In 1964, Johansen lost in the general election to Democrat Paul H. Todd, Jr. Johansen voted against the Civil Rights Acts of 1957, 1960, and 1964, as well as the 24th Amendment to the U.S. Constitution. The Washington Post described him as one of the most consistent non-Southern opponents of civil rights legislation in his era.

Johansen later served as executive vice president of the Robert A. Taft Institute for Government from 1966 to 1967. He was a lecturer and writer. Johansen died in Orlando, Florida, of Alzheimer's disease. He was buried at Glen Haven Memorial Park and Mausoleum in Winter Park, Florida.

== Sources ==
- United States Congress. "August E. Johansen (id: J000109)". Biographical Directory of the United States Congress.
- August E. Johansen at The Political Graveyard

U.S. House of Representatives
Preceded by Paul W. Shafer	United States Representative for the 3rd congressional district of Michigan; 1955 – 1965	Succeeded by Paul H. Todd, Jr.
