= Lorenzo T. Durand =

American lawyer and politician (1849–1917)

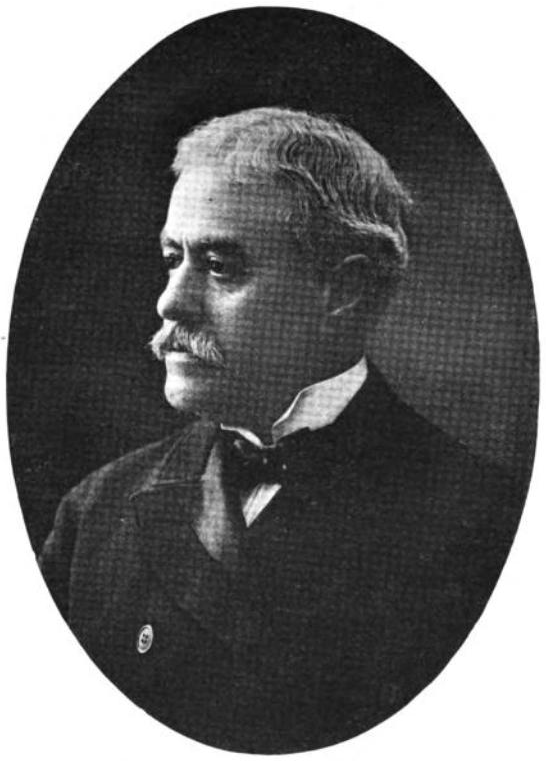
- Born: December 9, 1849; Morehouseville, New York
- Died: August 7, 1917 (aged 67); Detroit, Michigan
- Education: University of Michigan Law School
- Occupation: Lawyer
- Political party: Democratic
- Spouse: Flora C. Moore

Lorenzo Thurston Durand (December 9, 1849 – August 7, 1917) was an American lawyer and politician.

== Early life ==
Lorenzo T. Durand was born in Morehouseville, New York on December 9, 1849 to parents George H. Durand and Margret McMillan. George was of English descent and Margret was of Scottish descent. In 1858, the family moved to Genesee County, Michigan, where they settled on a farm. In the 1860s, either in 1860 or 1863, the family moved to Saginaw, Michigan.

== Law study and career ==
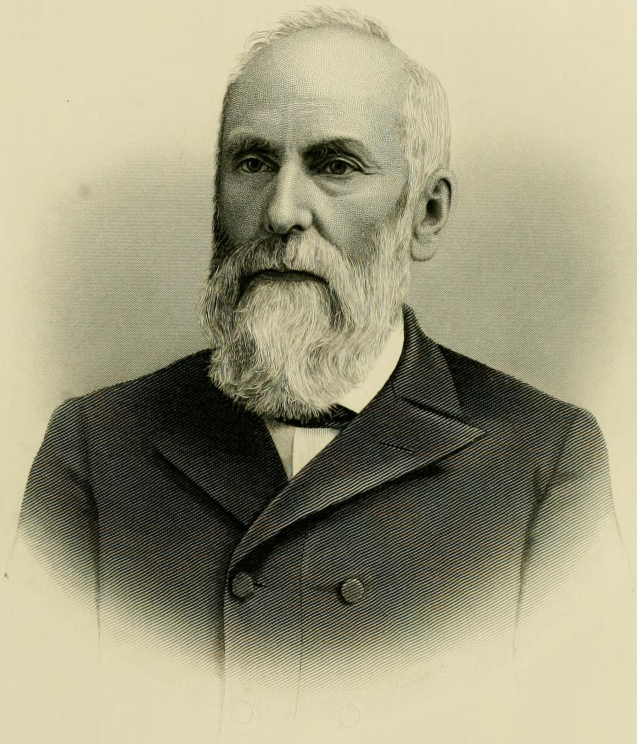
Father-in-law John Moore

Durand received up to a high school education before becoming a law student in the office of J. Brousseaer for a year. For two years after this, he studied law under the firm Webber & Smith. In 1870, Durand graduated with an LL.B from the University of Michigan Law School and was admitted to the Michigan bar that same year. Durand served as an assistant to Michigan Attorney General Dwight May for several years.

In 1870, Durand partnered with DeForrest Paine to form the law firm Durand & Paine, which lasted until around 1878, when Durand was elected Saginaw County prosecuting attorney. In this position, he served two terms, returning to private practice in 1882. As legal counsel for the Union Street Railway Company of Saginaw, Durand argued for the company's right to electrify their railways. This became a reality in 1889. By this time, Durand was president of the company. Durand later served as an attorney for the Central Bridge Company of Saginaw and as the president of the Saginaw County Savings Bank. At some point, Durand was a member of the Saginaw County Bar Association, and served as its president.

In 1897, Durand was selected as a trustee of the Union Saginaw School District, and later was elected as president of the Saginaw Board of Education. In 1902, Durand served as the Democratic nominee in the Michigan gubernatorial election. Durand was defeated by incumbent Republican governor, Aaron T. Bliss. After Bliss' death, Durand would serve as one of the executors of Bliss' will, and the chief counsel for his estate. Also in 1902, Durand was selected as a United States senatorial candidate in a complimentary way, as the senators representing Michigan at the time were both Republican. At some point, Durand was also to be nominated for the position of Michigan Attorney General, but he did not give consent to the nomination. In 1917, Durand was an unsuccessful candidate for the position of circuit judge in Michigan's 10th Circuit.

== Personal life ==
Lorenzo T. Durand was the brother of United States Representative George H. Durand. On February 15, 1872, Lorenzo married Flora Caroline Moore, daughter of John Moore. John Moore was a notable judge and lawyer in the area who, like Lorenzo, served as the Democratic gubernatorial nominee in 1868. Durand was a Freemason. Lorenzo was an Episcopalian.

== Death ==
Durand died of heart trouble on a business trip to Detroit in a Woodward train car on August 7, 1917. Durand was buried in Saginaw, Michigan.

Party political offices
Preceded by William C. Maybury	Democratic nominee for Governor of Michigan; 1902	Succeeded by Woodbridge N. Ferris
