= Thomas Dunstan =

Thomas Dunstan may refer to:

- Thomas Dunstan (Australian politician), member of the Queensland Legislative Assembly
- Thomas Dunstan (water polo), American water polo player
- Thomas B. Dunstan, American politician in Michigan
