= William C. Maybury =

American politician

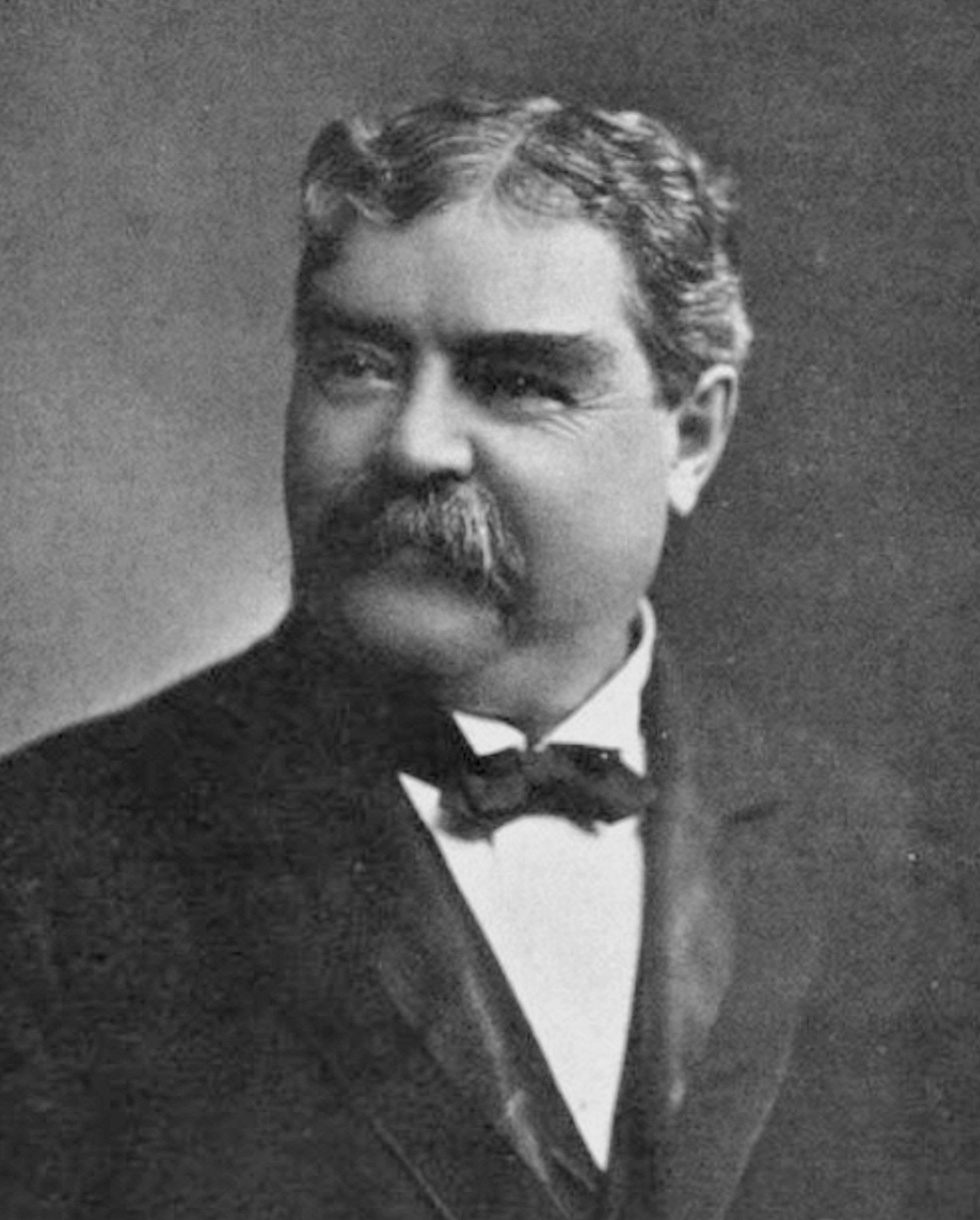

41st Mayor of Detroit
- In office 1897–1904
- Preceded by: William Richert
- Succeeded by: George P. Codd

Member of the U.S. House of Representatives from Michigan's 1st district
- In office March 4, 1883 – March 3, 1887
- Preceded by: Henry W. Lord
- Succeeded by: John L. Chipman

Personal details
- Born: November 20, 1848 Detroit, Michigan, U.S.
- Died: May 6, 1909 (aged 60) Detroit, Michigan, U.S.
- Party: Democratic
- Education: University of Michigan Law School
- Profession: Lawyer

William Cotter Maybury (November 20, 1848 – May 6, 1909) was an American politician from the U.S. state of Michigan.

== Early life ==
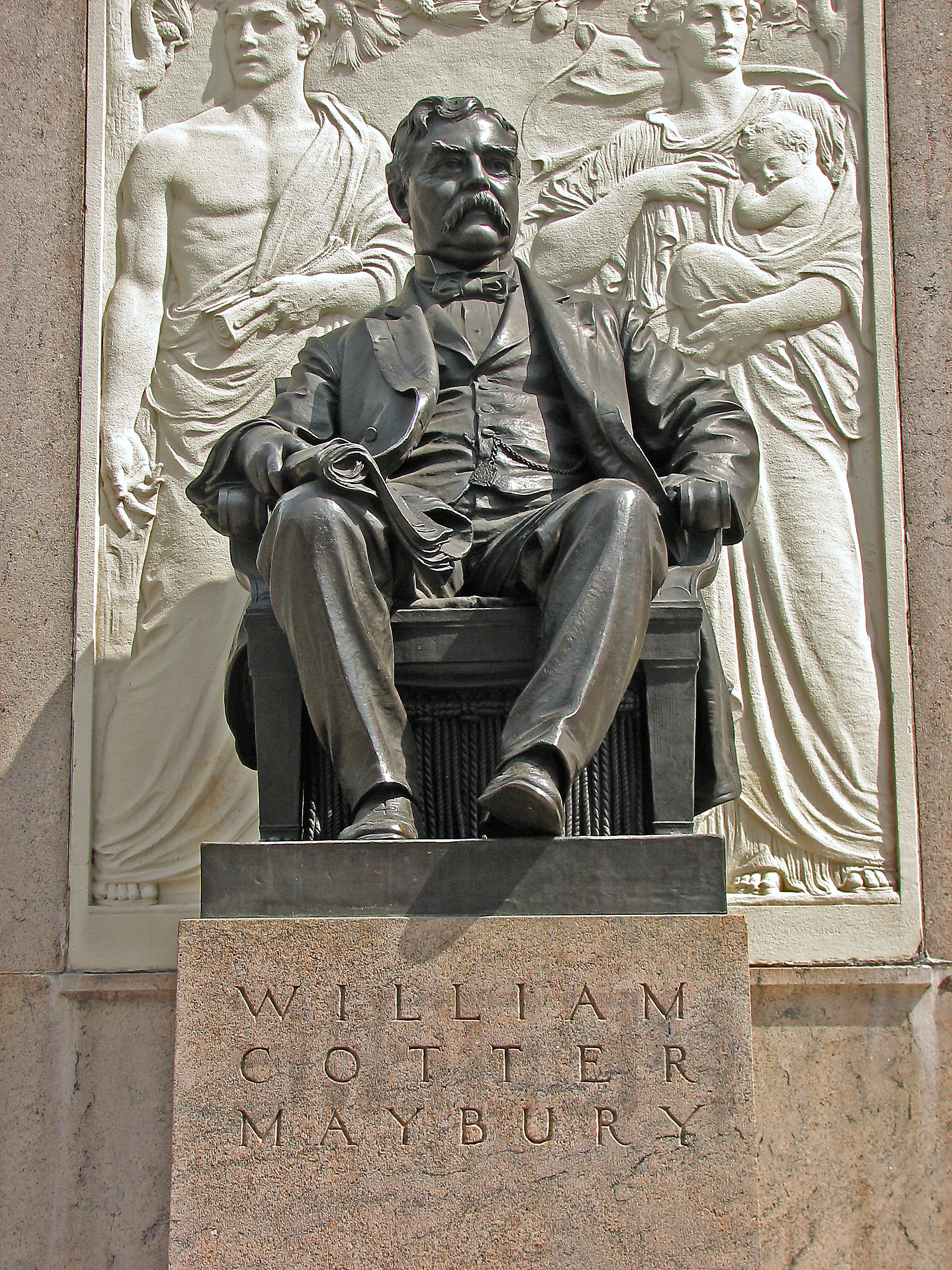
1912 statue of William C. Maybury in downtown Detroit

Maybury was born in Detroit, Michigan, on November 20, 1848, the son of Thomas Maybury. He attended public schools in Detroit, graduating in 1866. He went on to attend the University of Michigan at Ann Arbor, graduating from the academic department with a Bachelor of Arts in 1870 and from the law department with a Bachelor of Laws in 1871. He was admitted to the bar in the latter year and commenced practice in Detroit, entering into a partnership with Edward F. Conely. He was city attorney of Detroit from 1876 to 1880 and lecturer on medical jurisprudence in the Michigan College of Medicine at Detroit in 1881 and 1882.

== Politics ==
In 1880, Maybury ran as a Democrat for a seat in the U.S. House of Representatives from Michigan's 1st congressional district, losing in the general election to Republican Henry W. Lord. Maybury was elected in 1882 to the 48th and again in 1884 to the 49th congresses, serving from March 4, 1883, to March 3, 1887. He was not a candidate for re-election in 1886.

After returning from Washington, D.C., Maybury resumed the practice of law in Detroit. He was elected Mayor of Detroit in 1897, serving out the remainder of Hazen S. Pingree's term after the latter had resigned to become Governor of Michigan. He was re-elected twice more, serving as mayor until 1904. While mayor, he organized a time capsule, the Detroit Century Box, which contained the letters of 56 prominent citizens and was sealed on December 31, 1900. It was opened 100 years later, on December 31, 2000. Maybury was an unsuccessful candidate for Governor of Michigan in 1900, being defeated by Republican candidate Aaron T. Bliss.

== Later life and death ==
After Edward F. Conley's death in 1888, Maybury formed a law partnership with John D. Conely and Alfred Lucking, calling themselves Conely, Maybury, and Lucking. Conely retired in 1892 and the firm changed to Maybury & Lucking; it was later known as Maybury, Lucking, Emmons, & Helfman. Maybury also worked as counsel to the Standard Life & Accident Insurance Company.

In 1899, Maybury was one of twelve investors in Detroit Automobile Company, which was Henry Ford's first attempt at building automobiles. As with many early car ventures, the company floundered, and it was dissolved in January 1901.

Maybury remained a bachelor until the end of his life.

Maybury died in 1909 in Detroit and was interred in Elmwood Cemetery. There is a statue of Maybury in Grand Circus Park in downtown Detroit, which was completed by Adolph Alexander Weinman for $22,000 and unveiled to the public in 1912.

== See also ==
- Grand Circus Park
- Hazen S. Pingree

Party political offices
Preceded by Justin Rice Whiting	Democratic nominee for Governor of Michigan; 1900	Succeeded by Lorenzo T. Durand
U.S. House of Representatives
Preceded by Henry W. Lord	United States Representative for the 1st congressional district of Michigan; 1883–1887	Succeeded by John L. Chipman
Political offices
Preceded by William Richert	Mayor of Detroit; 1897–1904	Succeeded by George P. Codd
