= 1902 Michigan gubernatorial election =

- November 4, 1902
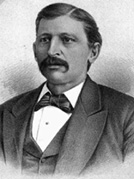

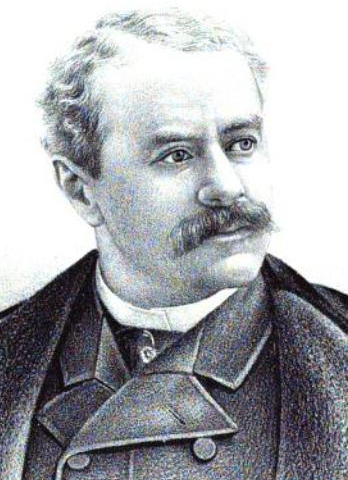
Nominee	Aaron T. Bliss	Lorenzo T. Durand
Party	Republican	Democratic
Popular vote	211,261	174,077
Percentage	52.52%	43.28%
- County results Bliss: 40–50% 50–60% 60–70% 70–80% 80–90% Durand: 40–50% 50–60%
Governor before election
Aaron T. Bliss
Republican
Elected Governor
Aaron T. Bliss
Republican

The 1902 Michigan gubernatorial election was held on November 4, 1902. Incumbent Republican Aaron T. Bliss defeated Democratic candidate Lorenzo T. Durand with 52.52% of the vote.

== Nominations ==
=== Republican Party nomination ===
Incumbent Governor Aaron T. Bliss was re-nominated with the first ballot at the 1902 Republican convention on June 26 in Detroit. Bliss received 811 votes on the ballot, Justus Smith Stearns received 214, George B. Horton received 40, and John Patton received 22.

=== Democratic Party nomination ===
Initially, during the 1902 Michigan Democratic Convention on July 31 in Detroit, George H. Durand was nominated for the gubernatorial election. Former congressman Timothy E. Tarsney was the first to nominate him. The convention was divided by the issue of bimetallism, with some Democrats supporting the policy of free silver, and some supporting the use of the gold standard. Durand supported the gold standard, but was eventually agreed upon between the factions. After four ballots, Durand was unanimously nominated by the convention, with the leader of the silver faction, State Senator James W. Helme Jr. who had competed with Durand for nomination, throwing his support behind Durand as well. Durand was not present at the convention, and had been removed from political life for around six years at the time of his nomination. Durand would go on to accept the nomination. The platform adopted by the convention focused on state issues, and criticized the Republican controlled state administration for perceived corruption and incompetency.

In early September, Durand suffered a paralyzing stroke due to a cerebral embolism. Though he initially planned to continue his gubernatorial run, by September 25, Durand's health forced him to withdraw his candidacy. Bimetallism continued to be a dividing issue in seeking a new candidate for governor. The silver faction of the party wanted to reconvene the convention to decide on another nominee, but the gold faction wanted to have the Democratic state central committee vote on a replacement. On September 30, after three hours of debate, the committee voted to fill the vacancy. Lorenzo T. Durand, the brother of George and fellow advocate of the gold standard, was selected with 14 votes on the second formal ballot. Charles R. Sligh, representing the silver faction of the party, got 10 votes on that ballot. Lorenzo's nomination was made unanimous with a third ballot.

=== Prohibitionist Party nomination ===
On August 8, Walter S. Westerman of Adrain was nominated by the 1902 Prohibitionist state convention in Detroit. His nomination was unanimous.

=== Socialist Party nomination ===
On March 1, the Socialist state convention in Flint had an attendance of nine delegates. William E. Walter of Detroit was nominated for governor.

=== Socialist Labor Party nomination ===
On July 5, the Socialist Labor state convention in Detroit nominated Shepard B. Cowles of New Lothrop for governor.

== General election ==
=== Candidates ===
Major party candidates

- Aaron T. Bliss, Republican
- Lorenzo T. Durand, Democratic

Other candidates

- Walter S. Westerman, Prohibition
- William E. Walter, Socialist
- Shepard B. Cowles, Socialist Labor

=== Results ===
1902 Michigan gubernatorial election
Party	Candidate	Votes	%	±%
Republican	Aaron T. Bliss (inc.)	211,261	52.52%	−3.22%
Democratic	Lorenzo T. Durand	174,077	43.28%	+2.01%
Prohibition	Walter S. Westerman	11,326	2.82%	+0.66%
Socialist	William E. Walter	4,271	1.06%	+0.57%
Socialist Labor	Shepard B. Cowles	1,282	0.32%	+0.14%
	Scattering	9	0.00%	
Majority		37,184	9.24%	
Total votes		402,226	100.00%	
Republican hold		Swing	-5.24%	

==== Results by county ====
Kalamazoo County voted Democratic for the first time since 1849. As a result, Bliss was the first Republican to be elected governor without carrying Kalamazoo County.

County	Aaron T. Bliss Republican		Lorenzo T. Durand Democratic		Walter S. Westerman Prohibition		William E. Walter Socialist		Shepard B. Cowles Socialist Labor		Margin		Total votes cast
County	#	%	#	%	#	%	#	%	#	%	#	%	Total votes cast
Alcona	505	80.03%	104	16.48%	18	2.85%	1	0.16%	3	0.48%	401	63.55%	631
Alger	633	69.41%	266	29.17%	7	0.77%	2	0.22%	4	0.44%	367	40.24%	912
Allegan	3,462	64.33%	1,716	31.88%	159	2.95%	19	0.35%	26	0.48%	1,746	32.44%	5,382
Alpena	1,937	55.39%	1,443	41.26%	32	0.92%	78	2.23%	7	0.20%	494	14.13%	3,497
Antrim	1,006	66.53%	451	29.83%	48	3.17%	3	0.20%	4	0.26%	555	36.71%	1,512
Arenac	709	48.59%	658	45.10%	32	2.19%	60	4.11%	0	0.00%	51	3.50%	1,459
Baraga	548	66.18%	266	32.13%	12	1.45%	1	0.12%	1	0.12%	282	34.06%	828
Barry	2,592	50.24%	2,321	44.99%	222	4.30%	13	0.25%	11	0.21%	271	5.25%	5,159
Bay	3,894	46.35%	4,223	50.26%	188	2.24%	73	0.87%	24	0.29%	-329	-3.92%	8,402
Benzie	786	56.55%	367	26.40%	227	16.33%	7	0.50%	3	0.22%	419	30.14%	1,390
Berrien	5,630	53.32%	4,575	43.33%	171	1.62%	163	1.54%	18	0.17%	1,055	9.99%	10,558 (Note: Includes 1 Scattering vote)
Branch	3,045	58.37%	1,997	38.28%	141	2.70%	14	0.27%	19	0.36%	1,048	20.09%	5,217
Calhoun	3,949	44.65%	3,990	45.11%	213	2.41%	650	7.35%	43	0.49%	-41	-0.46%	8,845
Cass	2,361	49.00%	2,283	47.38%	139	2.89%	28	0.58%	7	0.15%	78	1.62%	4,818
Charlevoix	836	69.44%	295	24.50%	52	4.32%	0	0.00%	21	1.74%	541	44.93%	1,204
Cheboygan	1,475	54.35%	1,170	43.11%	45	1.66%	13	0.48%	11	0.41%	305	11.24%	2,714
Chippewa	2,294	65.41%	1,131	32.25%	48	1.37%	13	0.37%	21	0.60%	1,163	33.16%	3,507
Clare	933	56.75%	674	41.00%	34	2.07%	2	0.12%	1	0.06%	259	15.75%	1,644
Clinton	2,380	53.81%	1,863	42.12%	164	3.71%	10	0.23%	6	0.14%	517	11.69%	4,423
Crawford	347	51.64%	303	45.09%	18	2.68%	3	0.45%	1	0.15%	44	6.55%	672
Delta	1,809	79.45%	392	17.22%	29	1.27%	25	1.10%	22	0.97%	1,417	62.23%	2,277
Dickinson	1,929	84.09%	289	12.60%	48	2.09%	11	0.48%	17	0.74%	1,640	71.49%	2,294
Eaton	3,416	53.27%	2,827	44.08%	138	2.15%	27	0.42%	0	0.00%	589	9.18%	6,413 (Note: Includes 5 Scattering votes)
Emmet	1,597	60.06%	906	34.07%	150	5.64%	5	0.19%	1	0.04%	691	25.99%	2,659
Genesee	4,276	52.04%	3,544	43.14%	259	3.15%	123	1.50%	14	0.17%	732	8.91%	8,216
Gladwin	644	69.77%	255	27.63%	18	1.95%	0	0.00%	6	0.65%	389	42.15%	923
Gogebic	1,408	65.67%	576	26.87%	117	5.46%	14	0.65%	29	1.35%	832	38.81%	2,144
Grand Traverse	1,317	64.06%	637	30.98%	92	4.47%	8	0.39%	2	0.10%	680	33.07%	2,056
Gratiot	3,268	63.28%	1,729	33.48%	147	2.85%	6	0.12%	14	0.27%	1,539	29.80%	5,164
Hillsdale	3,513	58.96%	2,149	36.07%	248	4.16%	39	0.65%	9	0.15%	1,364	22.89%	5,958
Houghton	3,874	68.05%	1,279	22.47%	234	4.11%	235	4.13%	71	1.25%	2,595	45.58%	5,693
Huron	2,583	56.91%	1,800	39.66%	116	2.56%	37	0.82%	3	0.07%	783	17.25%	4,539
Ingham	4,603	46.79%	4,790	48.69%	392	3.98%	33	0.34%	20	0.20%	-187	-1.90%	9,838
Ionia	3,697	50.17%	3,291	44.66%	253	3.43%	116	1.57%	12	0.16%	406	5.51%	7,369
Iosco	1,022	65.64%	500	32.11%	26	1.67%	4	0.26%	5	0.32%	522	33.53%	1,557
Iron	778	84.20%	132	14.29%	6	0.65%	3	0.32%	5	0.54%	646	69.91%	924
Isabella	2,027	53.98%	1,647	43.86%	67	1.78%	7	0.19%	7	0.19%	380	10.12%	3,755
Jackson	4,880	46.71%	5,276	50.50%	259	2.48%	23	0.22%	10	0.10%	-396	-3.79%	10,448
Kalamazoo	4,186	45.82%	4,605	50.41%	181	1.98%	119	1.30%	43	0.47%	-419	-4.59%	9,135
Kalkaska	567	78.42%	127	17.57%	25	3.46%	2	0.28%	2	0.28%	440	60.86%	723
Kent	9,706	51.52%	8,292	44.02%	472	2.51%	310	1.65%	58	0.31%	1,414	7.51%	18,838
Keweenaw	275	89.00%	30	9.71%	2	0.65%	0	0.00%	2	0.65%	245	79.29%	309
Lake	609	65.98%	285	30.88%	19	2.06%	10	1.08%	0	0.00%	324	35.10%	923
Lapeer	2,543	56.29%	1,747	38.67%	161	3.56%	63	1.39%	4	0.09%	796	17.62%	4,518
Leelanau	860	63.28%	453	33.33%	42	3.09%	4	0.29%	0	0.00%	407	29.95%	1,359
Lenawee	5,185	49.03%	4,230	40.00%	1,113	10.52%	32	0.30%	16	0.15%	955	9.03%	10,576
Livingston	2,325	46.76%	2,505	50.38%	133	2.67%	7	0.14%	2	0.04%	-180	-3.62%	4,972
Luce	329	65.93%	155	31.06%	13	2.61%	0	0.00%	2	0.40%	174	34.87%	499
Mackinac	782	50.85%	732	47.59%	18	1.17%	3	0.20%	3	0.20%	50	3.25%	1,538
Macomb	3,568	49.12%	3,512	48.35%	164	2.26%	15	0.21%	5	0.07%	56	0.77%	7,264
Manistee	2,030	52.51%	1,744	45.11%	73	1.89%	9	0.23%	10	0.26%	286	7.40%	3,866
Marquette	3,195	75.93%	830	19.72%	109	2.59%	30	0.71%	44	1.05%	2,365	56.20%	4,208
Mason	1,355	57.76%	874	37.25%	85	3.62%	19	0.81%	13	0.55%	481	20.50%	2,346
Mecosta	1,579	66.21%	707	29.64%	93	3.90%	3	0.13%	3	0.13%	872	36.56%	2,385
Menominee	1,784	59.51%	1,146	38.23%	34	1.13%	24	0.80%	10	0.33%	638	21.28%	2,998
Midland	1,357	56.59%	992	41.37%	34	1.42%	10	0.42%	5	0.21%	365	15.22%	2,398
Missaukee	1,129	65.22%	562	32.47%	37	2.14%	3	0.17%	0	0.00%	567	32.76%	1,731
Monroe	3,366	49.81%	3,157	46.72%	191	2.83%	33	0.49%	11	0.16%	209	3.09%	6,758
Montcalm	2,638	61.01%	1,378	31.87%	287	6.64%	5	0.12%	16	0.37%	1,260	29.14%	4,324
Montmorency	444	64.82%	238	34.74%	2	0.29%	1	0.15%	0	0.00%	206	30.07%	685
Muskegon	3,672	61.64%	1,912	32.10%	79	1.33%	261	4.38%	33	0.55%	1,760	29.55%	5,957
Newaygo	1,894	64.36%	948	32.21%	95	3.23%	1	0.03%	5	0.17%	946	32.14%	2,943
Oakland	4,976	48.88%	4,901	48.14%	251	2.47%	42	0.41%	10	0.10%	75	0.74%	10,180
Oceana	1,387	59.63%	675	29.02%	231	9.93%	22	0.95%	11	0.47%	712	30.61%	2,326
Ogemaw	842	64.03%	438	33.31%	30	2.28%	3	0.23%	2	0.15%	404	30.72%	1,315
Ontonagon	1,003	69.46%	427	29.57%	6	0.42%	5	0.35%	3	0.21%	576	39.89%	1,444
Osceola	1,524	72.64%	451	21.50%	111	5.29%	8	0.38%	4	0.19%	1,073	51.14%	2,098
Oscoda	242	77.32%	66	21.09%	5	1.60%	0	0.00%	0	0.00%	176	56.23%	313
Otsego	649	66.63%	286	29.36%	25	2.57%	8	0.82%	6	0.62%	363	37.27%	974
Ottawa	3,734	66.11%	1,680	29.75%	161	2.85%	14	0.25%	58	1.03%	2,054	36.37%	5,648
Presque Isle	1,133	65.57%	566	32.75%	12	0.69%	11	0.64%	6	0.35%	567	32.81%	1,728
Roscommon	238	52.08%	206	45.08%	5	1.09%	7	1.53%	1	0.22%	32	7.00%	457
Saginaw	6,410	44.75%	6,835	47.72%	199	1.39%	793	5.54%	87	0.61%	-425	-2.97%	14,324
Sanilac	2,196	66.12%	971	29.24%	138	4.16%	9	0.27%	7	0.21%	1,225	36.89%	3,321
Schoolcraft	819	65.31%	408	32.54%	21	1.67%	5	0.40%	1	0.08%	411	32.78%	1,254
Shiawassee	3,680	50.95%	3,127	43.29%	357	4.94%	44	0.61%	15	0.21%	553	7.66%	7,223
St. Clair	5,472	50.04%	5,172	47.29%	177	1.62%	85	0.78%	30	0.27%	300	2.74%	10,936
St. Joseph	2,335	46.23%	2,619	51.85%	75	1.48%	7	0.14%	15	0.30%	-284	-5.62%	5,051
Tuscola	3,077	59.70%	1,693	32.85%	346	6.71%	27	0.52%	11	0.21%	1,384	26.85%	5,154
Van Buren	3,710	59.45%	2,360	37.81%	132	2.12%	32	0.51%	7	0.11%	1,350	21.63%	6,241
Washtenaw	3,548	40.07%	5,054	57.08%	214	2.42%	22	0.25%	17	0.19%	-1,506	-17.01%	8,855
Wayne	21,659	39.26%	32,292	58.54%	707	1.28%	286	0.52%	221	0.40%	-10,633	-19.27%	55,165
Wexford	1,286	65.45%	574	29.21%	92	4.68%	8	0.41%	5	0.25%	712	36.23%	1,965
Total	211,261	52.52%	174,077	43.28%	11,326	2.82%	4,271	1.06%	1,282	0.32%	37,184	9.24%	402,226

===== Counties that flipped from Democratic to Republican =====
- Monroe

===== Counties that flipped from Republican to Democratic =====
- Calhoun
- Kalamazoo
- Saginaw
- Wayne
