= 1900 Michigan gubernatorial election =

- November 6, 1900
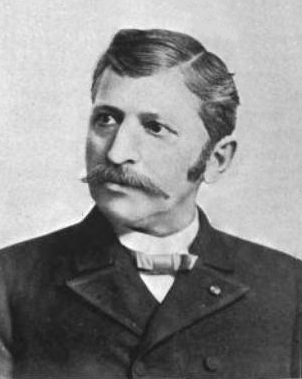

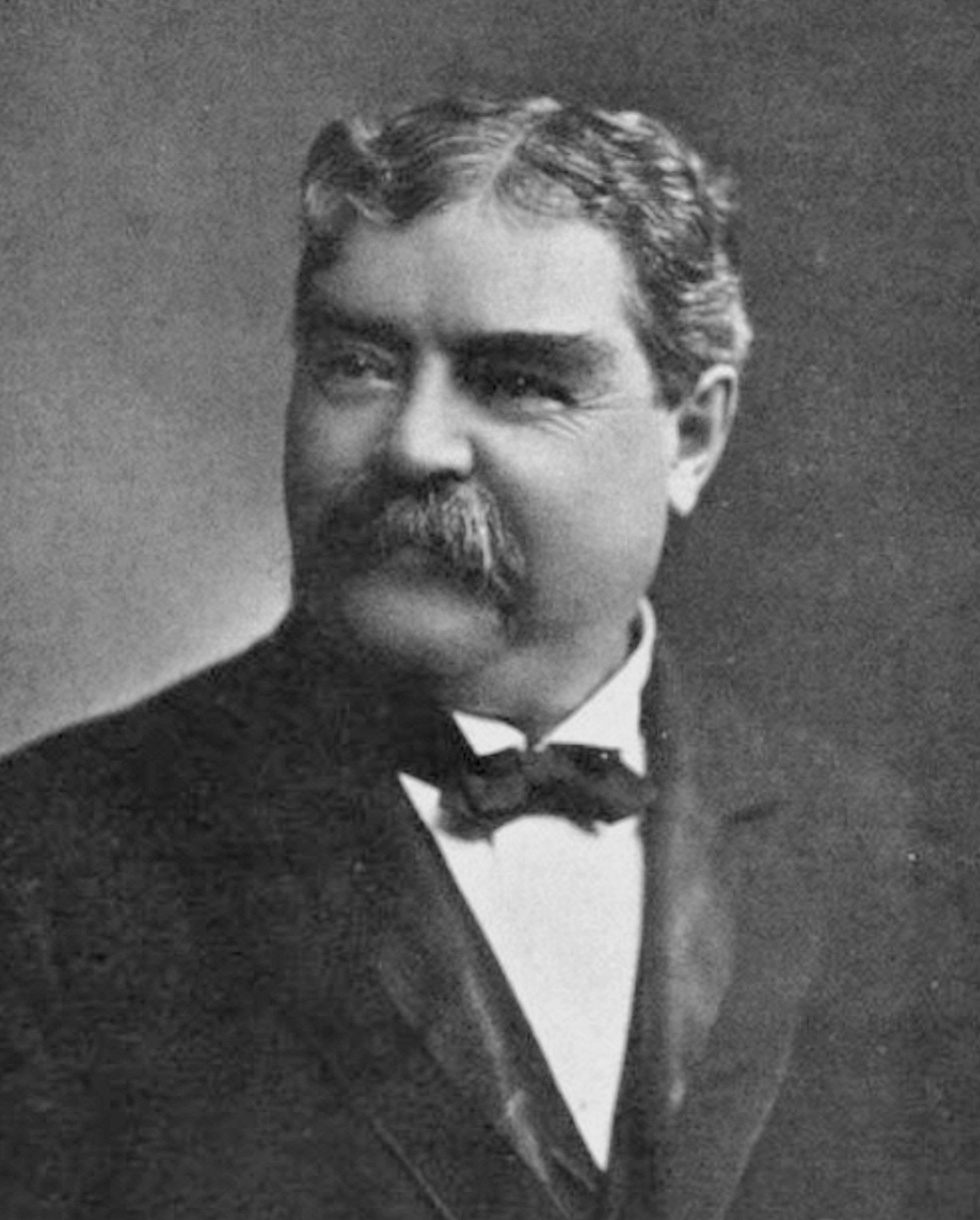
Nominee	Aaron T. Bliss	William C. Maybury
Party	Republican	Democratic
Popular vote	305,612	226,228
Percentage	55.75%	41.27%
- County results Bliss: 40–50% 50–60% 60–70% 70–80% 80–90% >90% Maybury: 40–50% 50–60%
Governor before election
Hazen S. Pingree
Republican
Elected Governor
Aaron T. Bliss
Republican

The 1900 Michigan gubernatorial election was held on November 6, 1900. Republican nominee Aaron T. Bliss defeated Democratic candidate William C. Maybury with 55.75% of the vote.

== General election ==
=== Candidates ===
Major party candidates

- Aaron T. Bliss, Republican
- William C. Maybury, Democratic

Other candidates

- Frederic S. Goodrich, Prohibition
- Henry Ramsay, Socialist Democrat
- Henry Ulbricht, Socialist Labor
- Daniel Thompson, People's

=== Results ===
1900 Michigan gubernatorial election
Party	Candidate	Votes	%	±%
Republican	Aaron T. Bliss	305,612	55.75%	−2.01%
Democratic	William C. Maybury	226,228	41.27%	+1.34%
Prohibition	Frederic S. Goodrich	11,834	2.16%	+0.50%
Social Democratic	Henry Ramsay	2,709	0.49%	
Socialist Labor	Henry Ulbricht	958	0.17%	−0.09%
Populist	Daniel Thompson	871	0.16%	−0.23%
	Scattering	2	0.00%	
Majority		79,384	14.48%	
Total votes		548,214	100.00%	
Republican hold		Swing	-3.35%	

==== Results by county ====
County	Aaron T. Bliss Republican		William C. Maybury Democratic		Frederic S. Goodrich Prohibition		Henry Ramsay Social Democratic		Henry Ulbricht Socialist Labor		Daniel Thompson Populist		Margin		Total votes cast
County	#	%	#	%	#	%	#	%	#	%	#	%	#	%	Total votes cast
Alcona	838	81.76%	171	16.68%	11	1.07%	1	0.10%	2	0.20%	2	0.20%	667	65.07%	1,025
Alger	990	67.58%	455	31.06%	13	0.89%	4	0.27%	1	0.07%	2	0.14%	535	36.52%	1,465
Allegan	5,591	60.73%	3,340	36.28%	239	2.60%	23	0.25%	1	0.01%	13	0.14%	2,251	24.45%	9,207
Alpena	2,249	57.77%	1,519	39.02%	29	0.74%	88	2.26%	5	0.13%	3	0.08%	730	18.75%	3,893
Antrim	2,548	74.09%	761	22.13%	75	2.18%	36	1.05%	7	0.20%	12	0.35%	1,787	51.96%	3,439
Arenac	938	48.60%	926	47.98%	41	2.12%	18	0.93%	0	0.00%	7	0.36%	12	0.62%	1,930
Baraga	573	60.51%	365	38.54%	6	0.63%	3	0.32%	0	0.00%	0	0.00%	208	21.96%	947
Barry	3,240	50.09%	3,005	46.45%	204	3.15%	9	0.14%	2	0.03%	9	0.14%	235	3.63%	6,469
Bay	5,893	48.60%	5,907	48.71%	264	2.18%	23	0.19%	26	0.21%	13	0.11%	-14	-0.12%	12,126
Benzie	1,459	65.40%	649	29.09%	112	5.02%	3	0.13%	1	0.04%	7	0.31%	810	36.31%	2,231
Berrien	6,593	54.70%	5,130	42.56%	192	1.59%	96	0.80%	24	0.20%	19	0.16%	1,463	12.14%	12,054
Branch	4,281	54.22%	3,482	44.10%	106	1.34%	8	0.10%	9	0.11%	9	0.11%	799	10.12%	7,895
Calhoun	6,177	49.03%	5,700	45.24%	353	2.80%	306	2.43%	36	0.29%	25	0.20%	477	3.79%	12,599 (Note: Includes 2 write-in votes for Hazen S. Pingree)
Cass	3,182	51.19%	2,875	46.25%	128	2.06%	14	0.23%	4	0.06%	13	0.21%	307	4.94%	6,216
Charlevoix	2,252	70.38%	810	25.31%	83	2.59%	47	1.47%	1	0.03%	7	0.22%	1,442	45.06%	3,200
Cheboygan	1,967	55.36%	1,535	43.20%	39	1.10%	6	0.17%	3	0.08%	3	0.08%	432	12.16%	3,553
Chippewa	2,427	68.97%	992	28.19%	84	2.39%	8	0.23%	4	0.11%	4	0.11%	1,436	40.78%	3,519
Clare	1,051	56.23%	781	41.79%	32	1.71%	2	0.11%	1	0.05%	2	0.11%	270	14.45%	1,869
Clinton	3,691	53.29%	3,074	44.38%	134	1.93%	14	0.20%	0	0.00%	13	0.19%	617	8.91%	6,926
Crawford	384	53.56%	317	44.21%	11	1.53%	3	0.42%	0	0.00%	2	0.28%	67	9.34%	717
Delta	3,087	70.40%	1,244	28.37%	27	0.62%	12	0.27%	8	0.18%	7	0.16%	1,843	42.03%	4,385
Dickinson	2,865	84.44%	455	13.41%	50	1.47%	9	0.27%	5	0.15%	9	0.27%	2,410	71.03%	3,393
Eaton	4,699	52.36%	4,046	45.08%	193	2.15%	15	0.17%	5	0.06%	17	0.19%	653	7.28%	8,975
Emmet	2,338	61.20%	1,326	34.71%	142	3.72%	6	0.16%	1	0.03%	7	0.18%	1,012	26.49%	3,820
Genesee	6,233	56.75%	4,284	39.00%	387	3.52%	53	0.48%	6	0.05%	21	0.19%	1,949	17.74%	10,984
Gladwin	934	70.44%	367	27.68%	20	1.51%	3	0.23%	2	0.15%	0	0.00%	567	42.76%	1,326
Gogebic	2,157	72.24%	708	23.71%	96	3.22%	11	0.37%	9	0.30%	5	0.17%	1,449	48.53%	2,986
Grand Traverse	3,082	66.84%	1,371	29.73%	134	2.91%	9	0.20%	4	0.09%	11	0.24%	1,711	37.11%	4,611
Gratiot	4,169	54.04%	3,25	43.10%	168	2.18%	23	0.30%	5	0.06%	25	0.32%	844	10.94%	7,715
Hillsdale	4,723	55.62%	3,458	40.73%	267	3.14%	27	0.32%	5	0.06%	11	0.13%	1,265	14.90%	8,491
Houghton	7,834	71.41%	2,633	24.00%	460	4.19%	27	0.25%	10	0.09%	6	0.05%	5,201	47.41%	10,970
Huron	3,375	56.08%	2,428	40.35%	152	2.53%	50	0.83%	3	0.05%	10	0.17%	947	15.74%	6,018
Ingham	5,122	47.61%	5,302	49.28%	279	2.59%	24	0.22%	7	0.07%	24	0.22%	-180	-1.67%	10,758
Ionia	4,969	52.69%	4,241	44.97%	188	1.99%	25	0.27%	1	0.01%	7	0.07%	728	7.72%	9,431
Iosco	1,321	62.43%	770	36.39%	18	0.85%	5	0.24%	1	0.05%	1	0.05%	551	26.04%	2,116
Iron	1,572	84.79%	260	14.02%	13	0.70%	7	0.38%	1	0.05%	1	0.05%	1,312	70.77%	1,854
Isabella	2,921	57.35%	2,068	40.60%	74	1.45%	6	0.12%	5	0.10%	19	0.37%	853	16.75%	5,093
Jackson	6,047	46.64%	6,525	50.33%	345	2.66%	25	0.19%	6	0.05%	17	0.13%	-478	-3.69%	12,965
Kalamazoo	5,848	51.47%	5,010	44.10%	263	2.31%	192	1.69%	17	0.15%	31	0.27%	838	7.38%	11,361
Kalkaska	1,282	73.34%	401	22.94%	55	3.15%	8	0.46%	1	0.06%	1	0.06%	881	50.40%	1,748
Kent	17,183	52.65%	14,509	44.46%	802	2.46%	93	0.28%	27	0.08%	20	0.06%	2,674	8.19%	32,634
Keweenaw	455	92.11%	32	6.48%	4	0.81%	1	0.20%	2	0.40%	0	0.00%	423	85.63%	494
Lake	833	67.78%	366	29.78%	15	1.22%	6	0.49%	4	0.33%	5	0.41%	467	38.00%	1,229
Lapeer	3,605	58.01%	2,348	37.79%	184	2.96%	61	0.98%	1	0.02%	15	0.24%	1,257	20.23%	6,214
Leelanau	1,462	68.13%	641	29.87%	35	1.63%	3	0.14%	2	0.09%	3	0.14%	821	38.26%	2,146
Lenawee	6,728	50.80%	6,099	46.05%	326	2.46%	27	0.20%	23	0.17%	41	0.31%	629	4.75%	13,244
Livingston	2,770	47.92%	2,838	49.09%	159	2.75%	8	0.14%	1	0.02%	5	0.09%	-68	-1.18%	5,781
Luce	382	65.30%	191	32.65%	10	1.71%	0	0.00%	1	0.17%	1	0.17%	191	32.65%	585
Mackinac	1,044	60.28%	662	38.22%	16	0.92%	9	0.52%	1	0.06%	0	0.00%	382	22.06%	1,732
Macomb	4,161	52.54%	3,614	45.63%	129	1.63%	0	0.00%	8	0.10%	8	0.10%	547	6.91%	7,920
Manistee	2,955	52.58%	2,557	45.50%	94	1.67%	9	0.16%	1	0.02%	4	0.07%	398	7.08%	5,620
Marquette	5,126	73.44%	1,620	23.21%	183	2.62%	14	0.20%	33	0.47%	4	0.06%	3,506	50.23%	6,980
Mason	2,163	60.52%	1,283	35.90%	90	2.52%	29	0.81%	7	0.20%	2	0.06%	880	24.62%	3,574
Mecosta	2,777	64.40%	1,427	33.09%	89	2.06%	9	0.21%	3	0.07%	7	0.16%	1,350	31.31%	4,312
Menominee	3,122	65.01%	1,613	33.59%	36	0.75%	13	0.27%	9	0.19%	9	0.19%	1,509	31.42%	4,802
Midland	1,621	51.82%	1,413	45.17%	52	1.66%	21	0.67%	6	0.19%	15	0.48%	208	6.65%	3,128
Missaukee	1,406	66.10%	641	30.14%	56	2.63%	18	0.85%	2	0.09%	4	0.19%	765	35.97%	2,127
Monroe	3,800	47.81%	3,957	49.79%	158	1.99%	12	0.15%	6	0.08%	15	0.19%	-157	-1.98%	7,948
Montcalm	4,774	62.15%	2,732	35.56%	145	1.89%	20	0.26%	0	0.00%	11	0.14%	2,042	26.58%	7,682
Montmorency	533	67.04%	253	31.82%	6	0.75%	2	0.25%	1	0.13%	0	0.00%	280	35.22%	795
Muskegon	5,162	62.09%	2,947	35.45%	125	1.50%	54	0.65%	18	0.22%	8	0.10%	2,215	26.64%	8,314
Newaygo	2,602	62.40%	1,435	34.41%	123	2.95%	4	0.10%	1	0.02%	5	0.12%	1,167	27.99%	4,170
Oakland	5,976	50.95%	5,274	44.97%	448	3.82%	23	0.20%	0	0.00%	8	0.07%	702	5.99%	11,729
Oceana	2,392	62.52%	1,229	32.12%	177	4.63%	13	0.34%	5	0.13%	10	0.26%	1,163	30.40%	3,826
Ogemaw	1,130	63.88%	585	33.07%	44	2.49%	3	0.17%	3	0.17%	4	0.23%	545	30.81%	1,769
Ontonagon	977	67.61%	452	31.28%	13	0.90%	0	0.00%	3	0.21%	0	0.00%	525	36.33%	1,445
Osceola	2,591	69.07%	974	25.97%	170	4.53%	8	0.21%	4	0.11%	4	0.11%	1,617	43.11%	3,751
Oscoda	254	79.13%	65	20.25%	2	0.62%	0	0.00%	0	0.00%	0	0.00%	189	58.88%	321
Otsego	988	65.26%	483	31.90%	33	2.18%	6	0.40%	1	0.07%	3	0.20%	505	33.36%	1,514
Ottawa	5,237	61.21%	3,142	36.72%	139	1.62%	25	0.29%	8	0.09%	5	0.06%	2,095	24.49%	8,556
Presque Isle	1,353	71.02%	522	27.40%	17	0.89%	5	0.26%	5	0.26%	3	0.16%	831	43.62%	1,905
Roscommon	316	61.84%	190	37.18%	5	0.98%	0	0.00%	0	0.00%	0	0.00%	126	24.66%	511
Saginaw	8,126	48.27%	7,980	47.41%	209	1.24%	392	2.33%	65	0.39%	61	0.36%	146	0.87%	16,833
Sanilac	4,127	62.86%	2,150	32.75%	258	3.93%	8	0.12%	2	0.03%	20	0.30%	1,977	30.11%	6,565
Schoolcraft	1,107	68.17%	480	29.56%	25	1.54%	7	0.43%	3	0.18%	2	0.12%	627	38.61%	1,624
Shiawassee	4,830	53.85%	3,733	41.62%	375	4.18%	12	0.13%	8	0.09%	11	0.12%	1,097	12.23%	8,969
St. Clair	7,205	59.48%	4,636	38.27%	187	1.54%	57	0.47%	17	0.14%	11	0.09%	2,569	21.21%	12,113
St. Joseph	3,134	47.55%	3,325	50.45%	99	1.50%	4	0.06%	2	0.03%	27	0.41%	-191	-2.90%	6,591
Tuscola	4,588	59.02%	2,846	36.61%	302	3.89%	15	0.19%	8	0.10%	14	0.18%	1,742	22.41%	7,773
Van Buren	4,912	58.18%	3,315	39.26%	153	1.81%	28	0.33%	5	0.06%	30	0.36%	1,597	18.92%	8,443
Washtenaw	5,027	46.72%	5,458	50.73%	221	2.05%	43	0.40%	6	0.06%	4	0.04%	-431	-4.01%	10,759
Wayne	33,310	49.14%	33,130	48.87%	515	0.76%	345	0.51%	422	0.62%	70	0.10%	180	0.27%	67,792
Wexford	2,466	66.40%	1,065	28.68%	118	3.18%	53	1.43%	5	0.13%	7	0.19%	1,401	37.72%	3,714
Total	305,612	55.75%	226,228	41.27%	11,834	2.16%	2,709	0.49%	958	0.17%	871	0.16%	79,384	14.48%	548,214

===== Counties that flipped from Democratic to Republican =====
- Lenawee

===== Counties that flipped from Republican to Democratic =====
- Bay
- Livingston
- St. Joseph
- Washtenaw
