= Charles C. Ellsworth =

American politician (1824–1899)

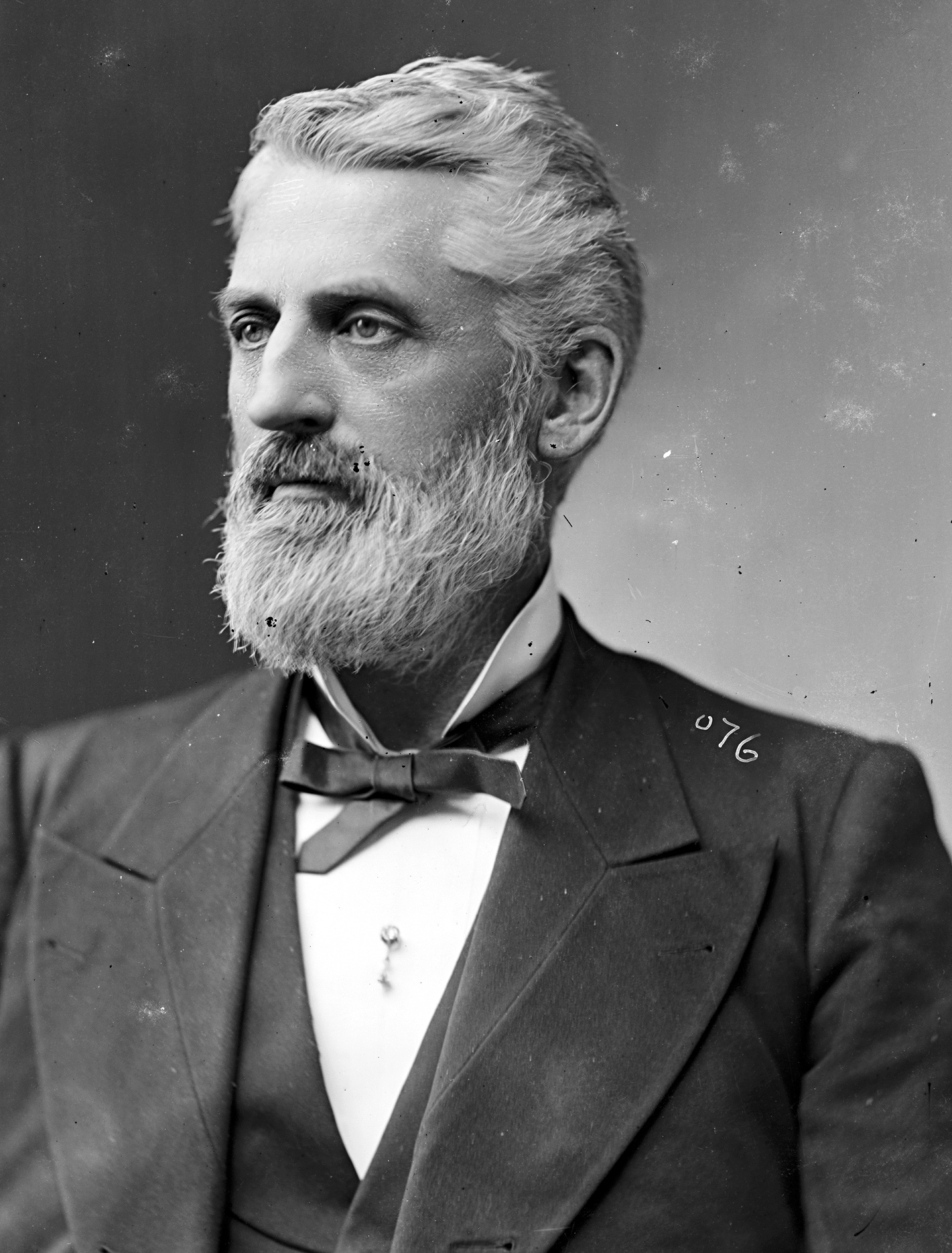
- Brady-Handy Photo collection, Library of Congress.

Member of the U.S. House of Representatives from Michigan's 8th district
- In office March 4, 1877 – March 3, 1879
- Preceded by: Nathan B. Bradley
- Succeeded by: Roswell G. Horr

Member of the Michigan House of Representatives
- In office 1852–1854

Member of the Vermont General Assembly

Personal details
- Born: January 29, 1824 Berkshire, Vermont
- Died: June 25, 1899 (aged 75) Greenville, Michigan
- Party: Republican
- Other political affiliations: Democrat
- Spouse: Elizabeth Gay Ellsworth
- Profession: Lawyer

Charles Clinton Ellsworth (January 29, 1824 – June 25, 1899) was an American politician from the state of Michigan.

== Biography ==
Ellsworth was born in the village of West Berkshire in Berkshire, Vermont. His mother, Bathama Ellsworth, died when he was two years old. His father, William C. Ellsworth, was a native of Connecticut and moved to Vermont at an early age. He was a locally eminent physician and was several times elected to the Vermont General Assembly.

Charles Ellsworth attended the common schools in West Berkshire, as well as the academy at Bakersfield. He taught school in Vermont for one winter and then moved to Howell, Michigan to study law with his brother-in-law Josiah Turner, who was then a practicing attorney and would later become a county and circuit judge and sit on the Michigan Supreme Court.

Ellsworth taught school in Howell during the winter and studied law until he was admitted to the bar in 1848. He commenced practice in Howell and, in 1849, was appointed by Michigan Governor John S. Barry as prosecuting attorney of Livingston County. He moved to Montcalm County and settled in Greenville in the spring of 1851 and became the first practicing lawyer in the area. He was elected to the Michigan House of Representatives in 1852 and served a single two-year term. He was twice elected prosecuting attorney of Montcalm County, serving from 1853 to 1857. He had been a Democrat until the Kansas-Nebraska Act in 1854 and the resulting violence that sparked the formation of the Republican Party in 1856.

In the spring of 1863, during the Civil War, Ellsworth was appointed by U.S. President Abraham Lincoln to be Paymaster of Volunteers in the Union Army, in which position he served until the end of the war with the rank of major. He was not attached to any regiment, but was assigned to the Army of the Cumberland.

After the war, Ellsworth returned to the practice of law in Greenville, where he became the first president when the village incorporated in 1867.

In 1876, Ellsworth was elected as a Republican from Michigan's 8th congressional district to the 49th Congress, serving from March 4, 1877, to March 3, 1879. He was not a candidate for renomination in 1878 and resumed the practice of law in Greenville.

Ellsworth was influential in bringing the Detroit, Lansing and Lake Michigan Railroad through Greenville. He joined the Society of Odd Fellows at Howell in 1849, and after moving to Greenville, he became a member of the Masonic Fraternity. He was active in the temperance movement, having belonged to several organizations, such as the Rechabites, Sons of Temperance, and Good Templars. He was educated as a Universalist, but during a religious revival in Howell, he joined the Methodist Church, which at the time was the only religious organization in Greenville. He later became a Congregationalist.

He was married in 1850 to Elizabeth Gay, the daughter of Edward F. and Clarissa Gay of Howell. Ellsworth died in Greenville and was interred there in Forest Home Cemetery.

U.S. House of Representatives
Preceded by Nathan B. Bradley	United States representative for the 8th congressional district of Michigan; 1877 – 1879	Succeeded by Roswell G. Horr
