= Orrin W. Robinson (politician) =

American politician (1834–1907)

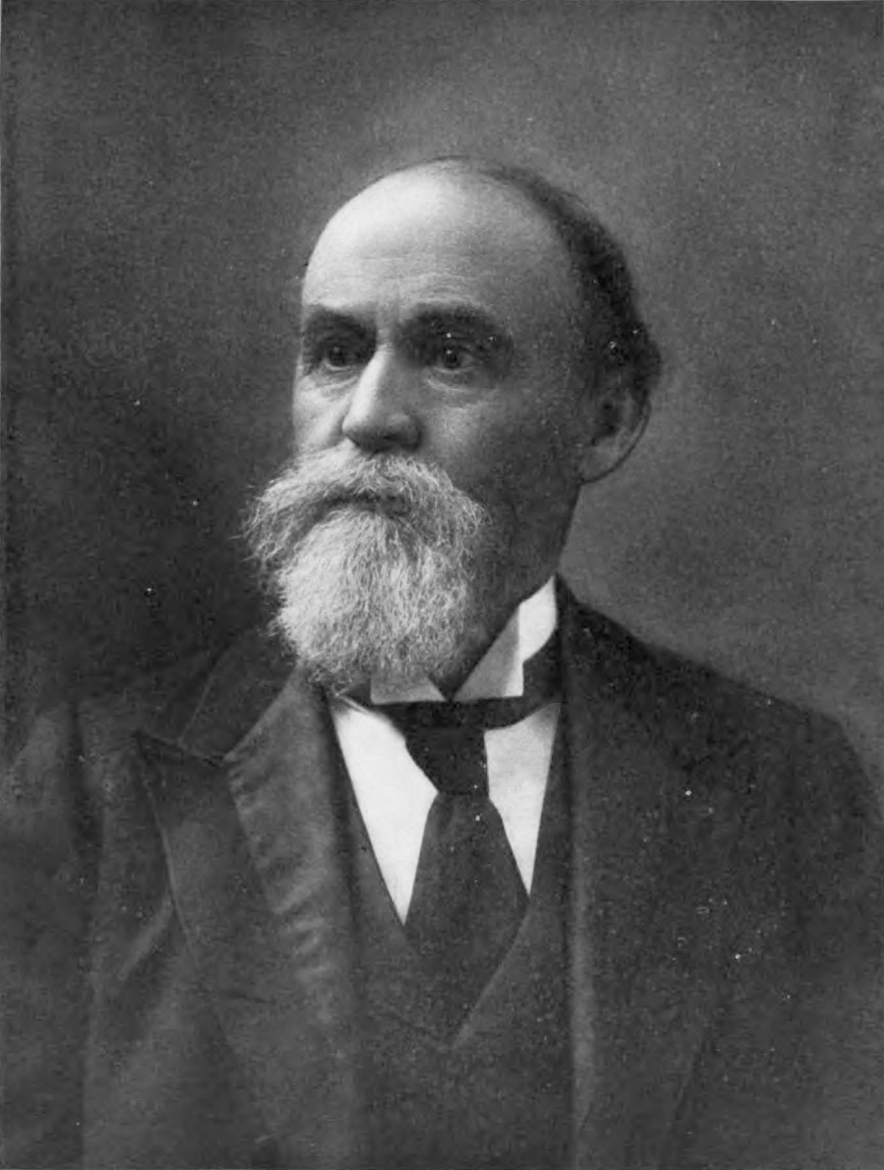
Orrin W. Robinson

Orrin Williams Robinson (August 14, 1834 – September 6, 1907) was an American politician and businessman. He ran a successful logging operation in the Upper Peninsula and was elected to serve in both houses of the Michigan Legislature and for two terms as the 31st Lieutenant Governor of Michigan, from 1899 to 1903 under Governors Hazen S. Pingree and Aaron T. Bliss.

== Early life ==
Robinson was born in Claremont, New Hampshire, to Williams Dean and Zilpah (Clement) Robinson. Orrin's great-grandfather, David Robinson, was a soldier in the Continental Army during the American Revolutionary War, reaching the rank of captain. After the war, David settled in Cornish, New Hampshire. A son, Everett Robinson, grandfather to Orrin, served in the War of 1812.

Orrin's early education was in the public schools. At the age of ten, he went to live on a neighboring farm, where he worked on the farm during the summer for his board and clothes and attended school in the winter. When he was 17, he went to work for a year at a gun factory in Windsor, Vermont. After this he spent two more years working on a farm in the summer and attending school during the winter. In 1854, at the age of 19, he borrowed fifty dollars to travel and join his uncle, S.S. Robinson, who was managing the Derby copper mine in Ontonagon County, Michigan. Arriving in June 1854, he worked for nearly two years at various mines in the area. In February 1856, he walked to Green Bay, Wisconsin, where he then proceeded by stage to Fond du Lac, then by rail to Chicago and Galena, Illinois on to Dubuque, Iowa. He then walked across the prairie to Fort Dodge, Iowa and then to Kossuth County, Iowa, where he worked as an engineer in a saw-mill. Following the Spirit Lake Massacre in March 1857, immigration into the area nearly stopped and combined with the Panic of 1857, this created greater economic hardship than usual for a frontier community. Robinson nonetheless purchased 320 acres (1.3 km^{2}) of land and lived there for about five years.

== Return to Michigan ==
In 1862, Robinson returned to Michigan and settled at the village of Hancock, where he worked as a shipping clerk in the Quincy Mine until 1873. During that time, he had acquired about 2,000 acres (8 km²) of pine timber land. In 1873, he organized the Sturgeon River Lumber Company, which built mills in Hancock.

The owners of that company also organized the Sturgeon River Boom Company in 1875, and built a channel to bring logs from the Sturgeon River to Pike Bay. In 1881, Robinson purchased the land of John Chassell, a local banker and business man, located on Pike Bay. Robinson moved into Chassell's house and later built a new house on the same lot. To accommodate further expansion, the company's mills and principal operations were moved from Hancock to Chassell in 1887-88. By that time, the Duluth, South Shore and Atlantic Railway had extended a line to the area with a stop at the growing community that Robinson named Chassell.

The new mill at Chassell, which had a capacity of twenty million board feet (47,000 m³) a year, employed over two hundred and was considered one of the largest in the state. Robinson maintained an interest in the business until 1902, when it was sold to the C. H. Wooster Lumber Company. Robinson also invested successfully in orange groves in Florida.

== Political career ==
Robinson cast his first vote in a U.S. presidential election in 1856 for John C. Frémont and was a Republican for the remainder of his life. He was a delegate from Michigan to the 1892 Republican National Convention. In November 1894, Robinson was elected to represent the 2nd district of Houghton in the Michigan State House of Representatives, and in 1896, he was elected to the Michigan Senate from the 32nd district. He was elected lieutenant governor in 1898 with Governor Hazen S. Pingree and re-elected in 1900 with Governor Aaron T. Bliss.

== Family and legacy ==
Robinson married Cornelia L. Lombard, of Weathersfield, Vermont on August 20, 1865 in Cleveland. They raised two children: M. Ethel, who graduated from Mary Institute in St. Louis, and the Boston Conservatory of Music; and Dean L., who finished a course of study at Smith Academy in St. Louis, Missouri, then entered the Phillips Exeter Academy in Exeter, New Hampshire, graduating in 1895. Dean graduated from the Literary Department of Harvard University in 1899 and Columbia Law School in 1901.

Political offices
Preceded by Thomas B. Dunstan	Lieutenant Governor of Michigan; 1899–1903	Succeeded by Alexander Maitland
