= William Richert (mayor) =

American politician (1858–1912)

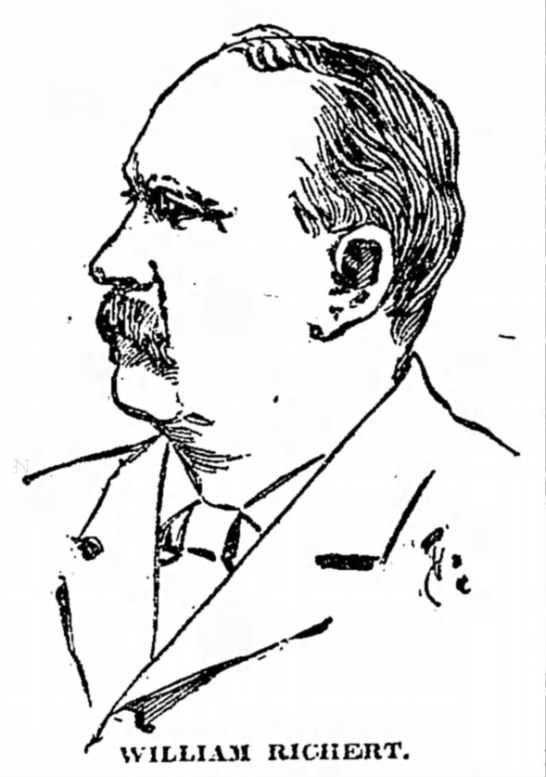

40th Mayor of Detroit
- In office 1897–1897
- Preceded by: Hazen S. Pingree
- Succeeded by: William C. Maybury

Personal details
- Born: October 28, 1858 Germany
- Died: June 16, 1912 (aged 53) Detroit, Michigan

William Richert (October 28, 1858 – June 16, 1912) served as acting Mayor of Detroit, from March 22 to April 5, 1897, following the resignation of Hazen S. Pingree.

== Biography ==
Richert's family moved from the German Empire to the United States when he was a teenager, and he became a grocer and wholesale liquor distributor. He served on the Detroit City Council as a Republican from 1890 to 1897, and as its president in 1895 and 1897. When Hazen S. Pingree was elected Governor of Michigan in 1897, Richert served as acting mayor until a special election was held. He ran unsuccessfully for state senate in 1899.

Richert later assisted a number of Germans to settle in Alameda, Saskatchewan. He also worked as a foreman for the Detroit Board of Public Works.

William Richert died in Detroit on June 16, 1912. He was buried at Elmwood Cemetery in Detroit.
