= Michigan's 8th congressional district =

U.S. House district for Michigan

Coordinates: 42°38′52″N 83°56′43″W

- Interactive map of district boundaries since January 3, 2023
- Representative: Kristen McDonald Rivet; D–Bay City
- Population (2025): 768,784
- Median household income: $67,892
- Ethnicity: 73.4% White; 14.9% Black; 5.4% Hispanic; 4.6% Two or more races; 1.1% Asian; 0.7% other
- Cook PVI: R+1

Michigan's 8th congressional district is a United States congressional district in Central Michigan. The district was first created in 1873, after redistricting following the 1870 census. From 2003 to 2013, it consisted of all of Clinton, Ingham, and Livingston counties, and included the southern portion of Shiawassee and the northern portion of Oakland counties. From 2013 to 2023, the district no longer covered Clinton or Shiawassee counties and instead covered more of Oakland County, including Rochester. In 2023, the district was redrawn to be centered on the city of Flint and the "Tri-Cities" metropolitan area around Saginaw, Midland, Bay City. The district includes all of Saginaw and Bay counties, almost all of Genesee County, and portions of Midland and Tuscola counties.

The district's current representative is Democratic incumbent Kristen McDonald Rivet. In the 2023 edition of the Cook Partisan Voting Index Michigan's 8th was rated as the median district in the country, with 217 districts rated more Democratic and 217 districts rated more Republican.

The district was one of 13 congressional districts that voted for Donald Trump in the 2024 presidential election while simultaneously electing a Democrat in the 2024 House of Representatives elections.

== Composition ==
For the 118th and successive Congresses (based on redistricting following the 2020 census), the district contains all or portions of the following counties and municipalities:

Bay County (19)

All 19 municipalities

Genesee County (33)

Argentine Township (part; also 7th; includes Argentine CDP), Atlas Township, Burton, Clayton Charter Township, Clio, Davison, Davison Township, Fenton (shared with Livingston and Oakland counties, part; also 7th), Fenton Charter Township, Flint, Flint Charter Township, Flushing, Flushing Charter Township, Forest Township, Gaines, Gaines Township, Genesee Charter Township, Goodrich, Grand Blanc, Grand Blanc Charter Township, Lennon (shared with Shiawassee County; part; also 7th), Linden, Montrose, Montrose Charter Township, Mount Morris, Mount Morris Charter Township, Mundy Charter Township, Otisville, Otter Lake (shared with Lapeer County; part; also 9th), Richfield Township, Swartz Creek, Thetford Township, Vienna Charter Township

Midland County (13)

Homer Township, Hope Township, Ingersoll Township, Jerome Township, Larkin Charter Township, Lee Township, Lincoln Township, Midland (shared with Bay County), Midland Charter Township, Mills Township, Mount Haley Township, Porter Township, Sanford

Saginaw County (36)

All 36 municipalities

Tuscola County (1)

Arbela Township (part; also 9th)

== Recent election results from statewide races ==
Year	Office	Results
2008	President	Obama 61% - 38%
2012	President	Obama 58% - 41%
2014	Senate	Peters 61% - 35%
2014	Governor	Schauer 55% - 43%
2014	Secretary of State	Dillard 51% - 46%
2014	Attorney General	Schuette 49% - 48%
2016	President	Clinton 48% - 47%
2018	Senate	Stabenow 53% - 45%
2018	Governor	Whitmer 55% - 43%
2018	Attorney General	Nessel 49% - 46%
2020	President	Biden 50% - 48%
2020	Senate	Peters 51% - 47%
2022	Governor	Whitmer 55% - 43%
2022	Secretary of State	Benson 56% - 41%
2022	Attorney General	Nessel 54% - 44%
2024	President	Trump 50% - 48%
2024	Senate	Slotkin 49% - 48%

== History ==
Prior to 1992, the 8th congressional district included the cities of Saginaw and Bay City as well as Huron, Tuscola and Sanilac Counties in the Thumb of Michigan, Arenac county north from Bay County, a total of about half the area of Saginaw County, and small northern portions of Lapeer and St. Clair counties.

This area would largely be transferred to the 5th district after the 1990 census, while most of the old 6th district became the 8th district. Unlike the old 6th district, the 8th did not include Pontiac. To make up for the loss in population, it picked up all of Lansing and Ingham County (which had previously been split between the 3rd and 6th districts). It also added the area around Brighton and portions of Washtenaw and Genesee counties.

In the 2002 redistricting, the district gained all of Clinton County about half of Shiawassee County and most of its area in Oakland County while losing its shares of Washtenaw and Genesee counties.

In the 2012 redistricting, the district dropped all of its area in Clinton and Shiawasee counties and was pushed further into Oakland County.

In the 2022 redistricting, the district was shifted to mid-Michigan to include the Tri Cities and Flint.

== List of members representing the district ==
Member	Party	Years	Cong ress	Electoral history
District created March 4, 1873
Nathan B. Bradley (Bay City)	Republican	March 4, 1873 – March 3, 1877	43rd 44th	Elected in 1872. Re-elected in 1874. Retired.
Charles C. Ellsworth (Greenville)	Republican	March 4, 1877 – March 3, 1879	45th	Elected in 1876. Retired.
Roswell G. Horr (East Saginaw)	Republican	March 4, 1879 – March 3, 1885	46th 47th 48th	Elected in 1878. Re-elected in 1880. Re-elected in 1882. Lost re-election.
Timothy E. Tarsney (East Saginaw)	Democratic (Note: Timothy E. Tarsney was elected as a fusion candidate, but was seated in Congress with the Democratic Party.)	March 4, 1885 – March 3, 1889	49th 50th	Elected in 1884. Re-elected in 1886. Lost re-election.
Aaron T. Bliss (Saginaw)	Republican	March 4, 1889 – March 3, 1891	51st	Elected in 1888. Lost re-election.
Henry M. Youmans (Saginaw)	Democratic	March 4, 1891 – March 3, 1893	52nd	Elected in 1890. Lost re-election.
William S. Linton (Saginaw)	Republican	March 4, 1893 – March 3, 1897	53rd 54th	Elected in 1892. Re-elected in 1894. Lost re-election.
Ferdinand Brucker (Saginaw)	Democratic (Note: Elected on the Democratic Peoples Union Silver ticket, a union of elements from the Democratic Party and Populist Party. They were seated as part of the Democratic Party in Congress.)	March 4, 1897 – March 3, 1899	55th	Elected in 1896. Lost re-election.
Joseph W. Fordney (Saginaw)	Republican	March 4, 1899 – March 3, 1923	56th 57th 58th 59th 60th 61st 62nd 63rd 64th 65th 66th 67th	Elected in 1898. Re-elected in 1900. Re-elected in 1902. Re-elected in 1904. Re-elected in 1906. Re-elected in 1908. Re-elected in 1910. Re-elected in 1912. Re-elected in 1914. Re-elected in 1916. Re-elected in 1918. Re-elected in 1920. Retired.
Bird J. Vincent (Saginaw)	Republican	March 4, 1923 – July 18, 1931	68th 69th 70th 71st 72nd	Elected in 1922. Re-elected in 1924. Re-elected in 1926. Re-elected in 1928. Re-elected in 1930. Died.
Vacant		July 18, 1931 – November 3, 1931	72nd	
Michael J. Hart (Saginaw)	Democratic	November 3, 1931 – January 3, 1935	72nd 73rd	Elected to finish Vincent's term. Re-elected in 1932. Lost re-election.
Fred L. Crawford (Saginaw)	Republican	January 3, 1935 – January 3, 1953	74th 75th 76th 77th 78th 79th 80th 81st 82nd	Elected in 1934. Re-elected in 1936. Re-elected in 1938. Re-elected in 1940. Re-elected in 1942. Re-elected in 1944. Re-elected in 1946. Re-elected in 1948. Re-elected in 1950. Lost renomination.
Alvin M. Bentley (Owosso)	Republican	January 3, 1953 – January 3, 1961	83rd 84th 85th 86th	Elected in 1952. Re-elected in 1954. Re-elected in 1956. Re-elected in 1958. Retired to run for U.S. Senator.
James Harvey (Saginaw)	Republican	January 3, 1961 – January 31, 1974	87th 88th 89th 90th 91st 92nd 93rd	Elected in 1960. Re-elected in 1962. Re-elected in 1964. Re-elected in 1966. Re-elected in 1968. Re-elected in 1970. Re-elected in 1972. Resigned to become judge of the Eastern District of Michigan.
Vacant		January 31, 1974 – April 23, 1974	93rd	
J. Bob Traxler (Bay City)	Democratic	April 23, 1974 – January 3, 1993	93rd 94th 95th 96th 97th 98th 99th 100th 101st 102nd	Elected to finish Harvey's term. Re-elected in 1974. Re-elected in 1976. Re-elected in 1978. Re-elected in 1980. Re-elected in 1982. Re-elected in 1984. Re-elected in 1986. Re-elected in 1988. Re-elected in 1990. Retired.
Bob Carr (East Lansing)	Democratic	January 3, 1993 – January 3, 1995	103rd	Redistricted from the 6th district and re-elected in 1992. Retired to run for U.S. Senator.
Dick Chrysler (Brighton)	Republican	January 3, 1995 – January 3, 1997	104th	Elected in 1994. Lost re-election.
Debbie Stabenow (Lansing)	Democratic	January 3, 1997 – January 3, 2001	105th 106th	Elected in 1996. Re-elected in 1998. Retired to run for U.S. Senator.
Mike Rogers (Brighton)	Republican	January 3, 2001 – January 3, 2015	107th 108th 109th 110th 111th 112th 113th	Elected in 2000. Re-elected in 2002. Re-elected in 2004. Re-elected in 2006. Re-elected in 2008. Re-elected in 2010. Re-elected in 2012. Retired.
Mike Bishop (Rochester)	Republican	January 3, 2015 – January 3, 2019	114th 115th	Elected in 2014. Re-elected in 2016. Lost re-election.
Elissa Slotkin (Holly)	Democratic	January 3, 2019 – January 3, 2023	116th 117th	Elected in 2018. Re-elected in 2020. Redistricted to the 7th district.
Dan Kildee (Flint Township)	Democratic	January 3, 2023 – January 3, 2025	118th	Redistricted from the 5th district and re-elected in 2022. Retired.
Kristen McDonald Rivet (Bay City)	Democratic	January 3, 2025 – present	119th	Elected in 2024. Re-elected in 2026.

== Recent election results ==
=== 2012 ===
Michigan's 8th congressional district, 2012
Party	Candidate	Votes	%
Republican	Mike Rogers (incumbent)	202,217	58.6
Democratic	Lance Enderle	128,657	37.3
Libertarian	Daniel Goebel	8,083	2.3
Independent	Preston Brooks	6,097	1.8
Total votes		345,054	100.0
Republican hold			

=== 2014 ===
Michigan's 8th congressional district, 2014
Party	Candidate	Votes	%
Republican	Mike Bishop	132,739	54.6
Democratic	Eric Schertzing	102,269	42.1
Libertarian	James Weeks	4,557	1.9
Green	Jim Casha	1,880	0.8
Natural Law	Jeremy Burgess	1,680	0.7
Total votes		243,125	100.0
Republican hold			

=== 2016 ===
Michigan's 8th congressional district, 2016
Party	Candidate	Votes	%
Republican	Mike Bishop (incumbent)	205,629	56.0
Democratic	Suzanna Shkreli	143,791	39.2
Libertarian	Jeff Wood	9,619	2.6
Green	Maria Green	5,679	1.6
Natural Law	Jeremy Burgess	2,250	0.6
Total votes		366,968	100.0
Republican hold			

=== 2018 ===
Michigan's 8th congressional district, 2018
Party	Candidate	Votes	%
Democratic	Elissa Slotkin	172,880	50.6
Republican	Mike Bishop (incumbent)	159,782	46.8
Libertarian	Brian Ellison	6,302	1.8
U.S. Taxpayers'	David Lillis	2,629	0.8
Total votes		341,593	100.0
Democratic gain from Republican			

=== 2020 ===
Michigan's 8th congressional district, 2020
Party	Candidate	Votes	%
Democratic	Elissa Slotkin (incumbent)	217,922	50.9
Republican	Paul Junge	202,525	47.3
Libertarian	Joe Hartman	7,897	1.8
Total votes		428,344	100.0
Democratic hold			

=== 2022 ===
Michigan's 8th congressional district, 2022
Party	Candidate	Votes	%
Democratic	Dan Kildee (incumbent)	178,322	53.1
Republican	Paul Junge	143,850	42.8
Working Class	Kathy Goodwin	9,077	2.7
Libertarian	David Canny	4,580	1.3
Total votes		335,829	100.0
Democratic hold			

=== 2024 ===
Michigan's 8th congressional district, 2024
Party	Candidate	Votes	%
Democratic	Kristen McDonald Rivet	217,490	51.3
Republican	Paul Junge	189,317	44.6
Working Class	Kathy Goodwin	8,492	2.0
Libertarian	Steve Barcelo	4,768	1.1
Constitution	James Allen Little	2,681	0.6
Green	Jim Casha	1,602	0.4
Total votes		424,350	100.0
Democratic hold			

== Historical district boundaries ==
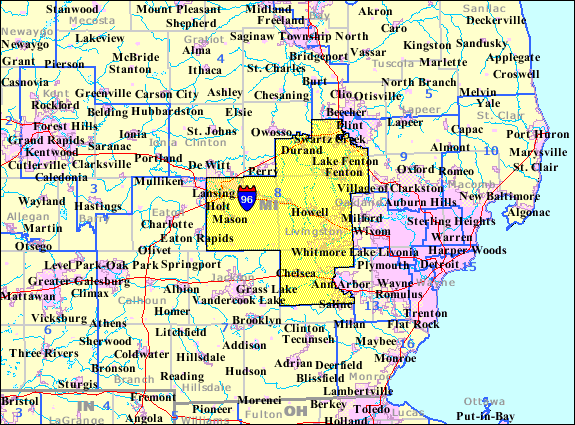
1993–2003

2003–2013

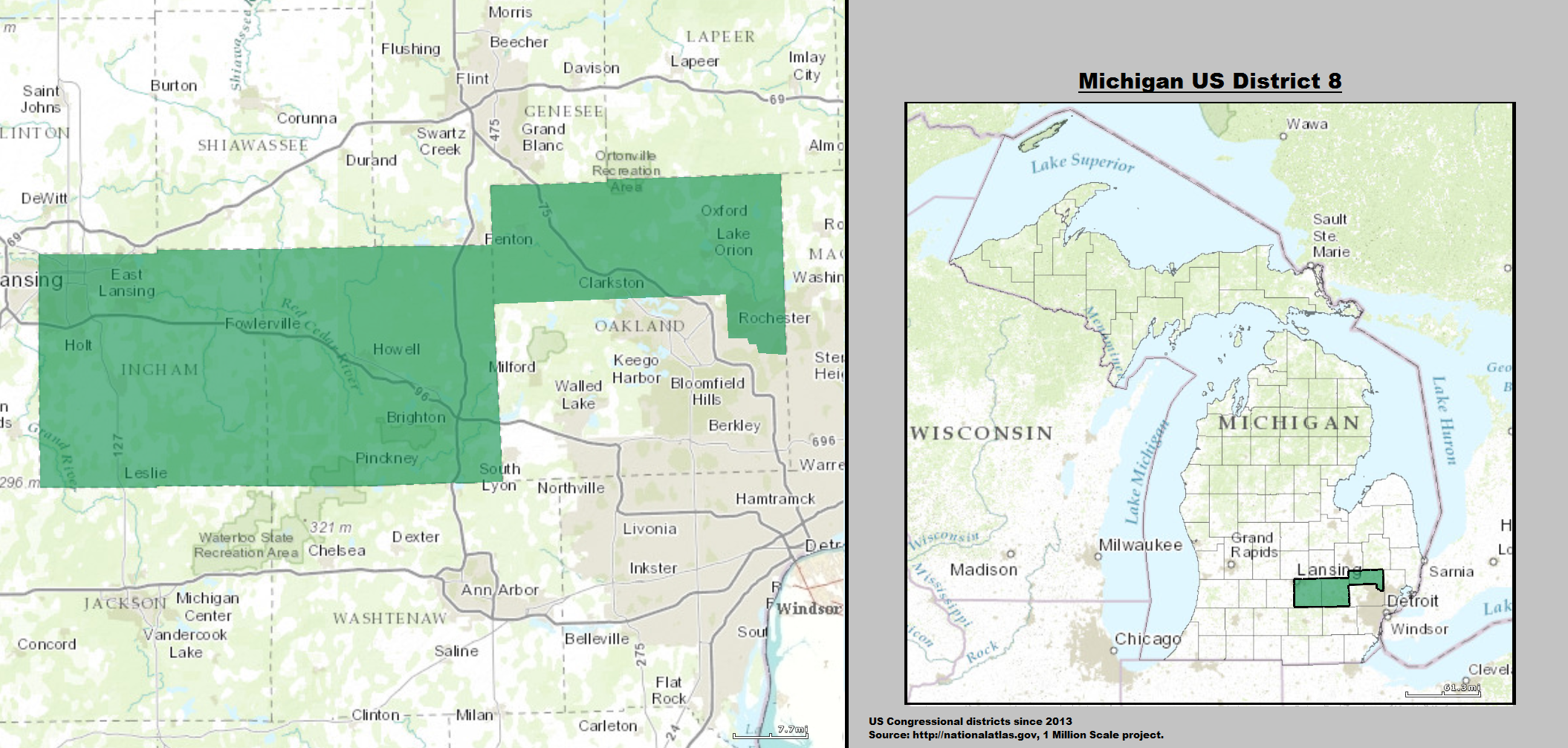
2013–2023

== See also ==
- Michigan's congressional districts
- List of United States congressional districts
