= Henry W. Lord =

American politician (1821–1891)

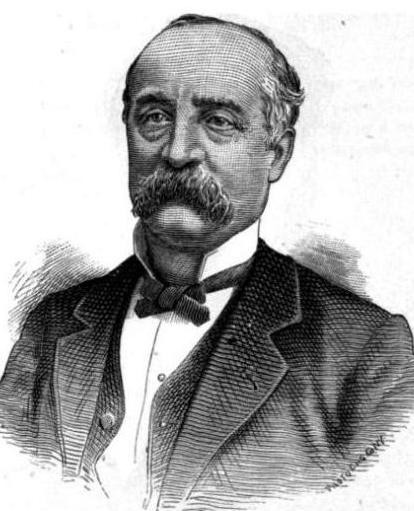

Member of the U.S. House of Representatives from Michigan's 1st district
- In office March 4, 1881 – March 3, 1883
- Preceded by: John S. Newberry
- Succeeded by: William C. Maybury

Personal details
- Born: March 8, 1821 Northampton, Massachusetts, U.S.
- Died: January 25, 1891 (aged 69) Butte, Montana, U.S.
- Resting place: Elmwood Cemetery; Detroit, Michigan
- Party: Republican
- Profession: Merchant; Diplomat; Politician

Henry William Lord (March 8, 1821 – January 25, 1891) was a merchant, diplomat and politician from the U.S. state of Michigan. He served as the United States consul to Manchester, England and as a U.S. representative from the state of Michigan.

== Early life ==
Lord was born in Northampton, Massachusetts, and received an academic education in Andover, Massachusetts. He studied law but did not practice. He moved to Detroit, Michigan, in 1839. Four years later, he went to Pontiac, Michigan, and engaged in agricultural and mercantile pursuits, and foreign service. In 1876, he returned to Detroit.

== Political career ==
In 1861, he was appointed by President Abraham Lincoln to become United States consul to Manchester, England. He served in that position until his resignation in 1867. While in that post, he developed plans that improved consular services.

He served on the Michigan board of corrections and charities from 1871 to 1882, and president of the board if trustees at Michigan Military Academy from 1878 to 1880. In 1876, he served as a Presidential elector from Michigan.

Lord was elected as a Republican candidate from Michigan's 1st congressional district to the 47th Congress, serving from March 4, 1881, to March 3, 1883. He was an unsuccessful candidate for re-election in 1882.

He was appointed by President Chester A. Arthur to become register of the United States land office at Creelsburg, North Dakota on August 1, 1883. The office was transferred to Devils Lake, North Dakota on January 17, 1884, and Lord continued as register until April 18, 1888.

== Death ==
At age 69, Lord was killed in a railroad accident near Butte, Montana, on January 25, 1891. He is interred in Elmwood Cemetery in Detroit.

U.S. House of Representatives
Preceded by John S. Newberry	United States Representative for the 1st congressional district of Michigan; 1881–1883	Succeeded by William C. Maybury
