= Nathan B. Bradley =

American politician (1831–1906)

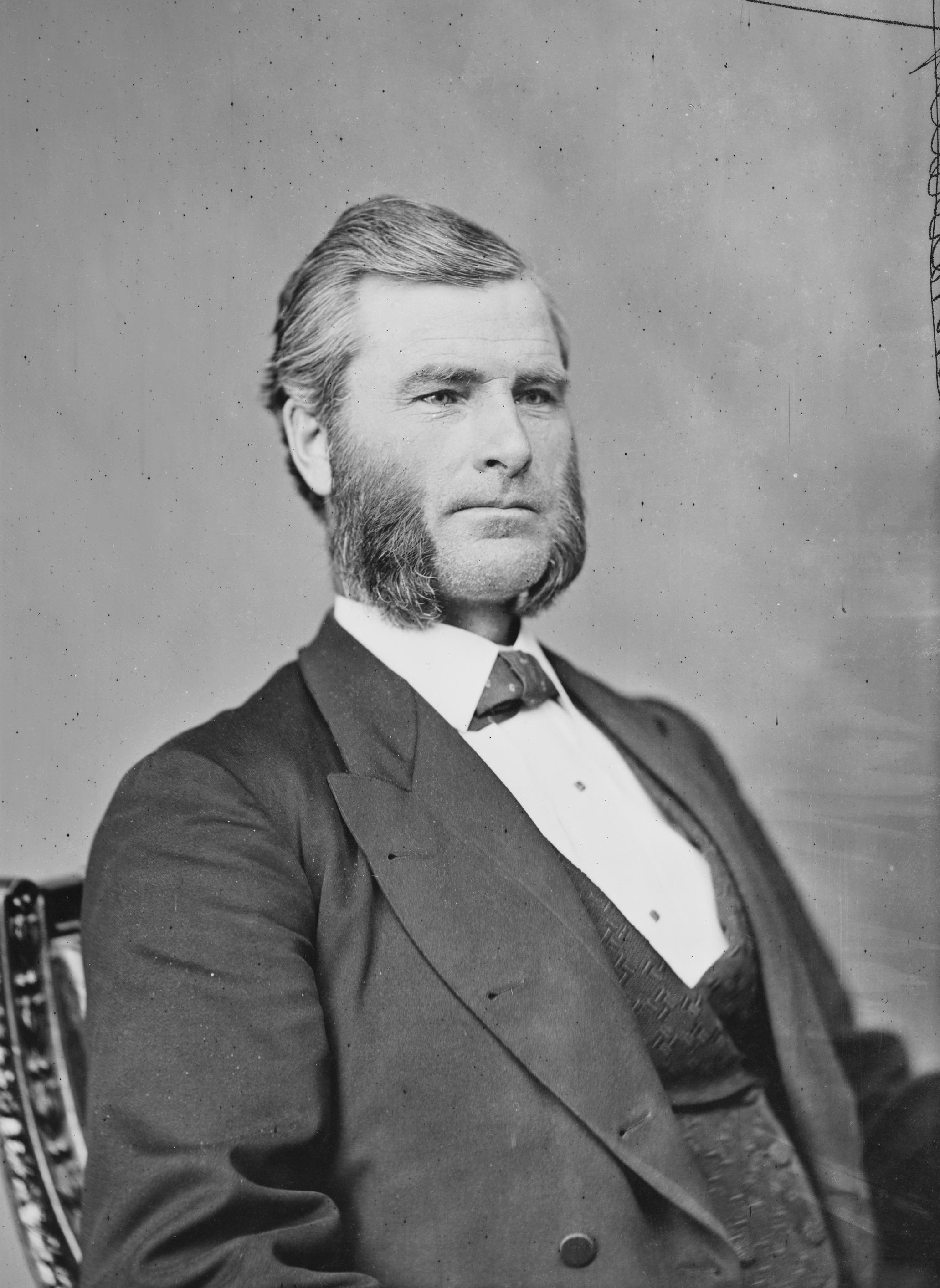

Member of the U.S. House of Representatives from Michigan's 8th district
- In office March 4, 1873 – March 3, 1877
- Preceded by: District created
- Succeeded by: Charles C. Ellsworth

Member of the Michigan Senate from the 27th district
- In office January 1, 1867 – December 31, 1868
- Preceded by: David Jerome
- Succeeded by: C. B. Mills

1st Mayor of Bay City
- In office 1865–1865
- Preceded by: City incorporated
- Succeeded by: James Watson

Personal details
- Born: May 28, 1831 Lee, Massachusetts
- Died: November 8, 1906 (aged 75) Bay City, Michigan
- Party: Republican
- Profession: Lumber manufacture

Nathan Ball Bradley (May 28, 1831 – November 8, 1906) was a politician from the U.S. state of Michigan. He served two terms in the United States House of Representatives from 1873 to 1877.

== Early life and education ==
Bradley was born in Lee, Massachusetts and moved with his parents to Lorain County, Ohio, in 1835 where he attended the common schools. He moved to Wisconsin in 1849 and was employed in a sawmill in the pine region. He returned to Ohio in 1850 and built and operated a sawmill until 1852, when he moved to Lexington, Michigan, and engaged in the manufacture of lumber.

He moved to St. Charles, in the Saginaw Valley, in 1855 and engaged in the lumber industry. He purchased a mill in Bay City, which he operated from 1858 to 1864. He also engaged in the salt industry in Bay City, where he was also justice of the peace for three terms, a supervisor one term, an alderman three terms, and the first mayor of Bay City after it obtained its charter in 1865. He was a member of the Michigan State Senate from 1866 to 1868. He also engaged in banking in 1867, becoming vice president of the First National Bank of Bay City.

== Congress ==
Bradley was elected as a Republican and the first person to represent Michigan's 8th congressional district to the 43rd and 44th Congresses, serving from March 4, 1873, to March 3, 1877. He was not a candidate for renomination in 1876.

== After Congress ==
After leaving Congress, he returned to the lumber business in Bay City and also was instrumental in establishing the first beet-sugar factory in the state. Bradley died in Bay City on November 8, 1906, and is interred in Elm Lawn Cemetery there.

Political offices
U.S. House of Representatives
Preceded by None	United States Representative for the 8th congressional district of Michigan; 1873 – 1877	Succeeded by Charles C. Ellsworth
