= Roswell G. Horr =

American politician (1830–1896)

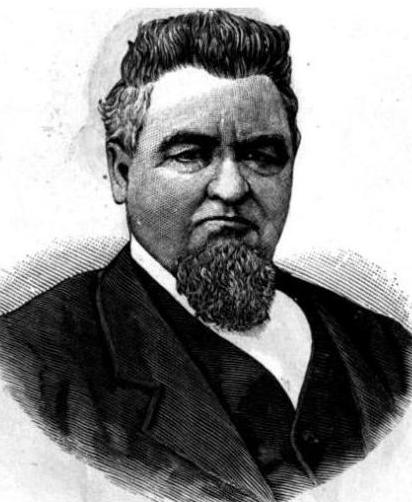
- From 1882's Public Men of To-Day, by Phineas Camp Headley.

Member of the U.S. House of Representatives from Michigan's 8th district
- In office March 4, 1879 – March 3, 1885
- Preceded by: Charles C. Ellsworth
- Succeeded by: Timothy E. Tarsney

Personal details
- Born: November 26, 1830 Waitsfield, Vermont
- Died: December 19, 1896 (aged 66) Plainfield, New Jersey
- Party: Republican
- Education: Antioch College
- Profession: Lawyer

Roswell Gilbert Horr (November 26, 1830 – December 19, 1896) was a politician from the U.S. state of Michigan.

Horr was born in Waitsfield, Vermont and moved with his parents to Lorain County, Ohio, in 1834, where he attended the public schools. He graduated from Antioch College in Yellow Springs, Ohio, in 1857 and was clerk of the court of common pleas of Lorain County from 1857 to 1862 and reelected in 1860. He studied law, was admitted to the bar in 1862, and commenced practice in Elyria, Ohio. Horr moved to southeastern Missouri in 1866, where he engaged in mining for six years before moving to East Saginaw, Michigan in 1872.

Horr was elected as a Republican from Michigan's 8th congressional district to the 46th, 47th, and 48th United States Congresses, serving from March 4, 1879 to March 3, 1885. He was an unsuccessful candidate for reelection in 1884. He was a delegate to the Republican National Convention in 1884 and was again an unsuccessful candidate for election in 1886 to the 50th U.S. Congress.

In 1890, Roswell G. Horr moved to New York City and was an associate editor on the staff of the New York Tribune until his death in Plainfield, New Jersey. He was interred in Greenwood Cemetery, in Wellington, Ohio.

U.S. House of Representatives
| Preceded by Charles C. Ellsworth | United States Representative for the 8th congressional district of Michigan; 1879 – 1885 | Succeeded by Timothy E. Tarsney |
