= John Stoughton Newberry =

American politician (1826–1887)

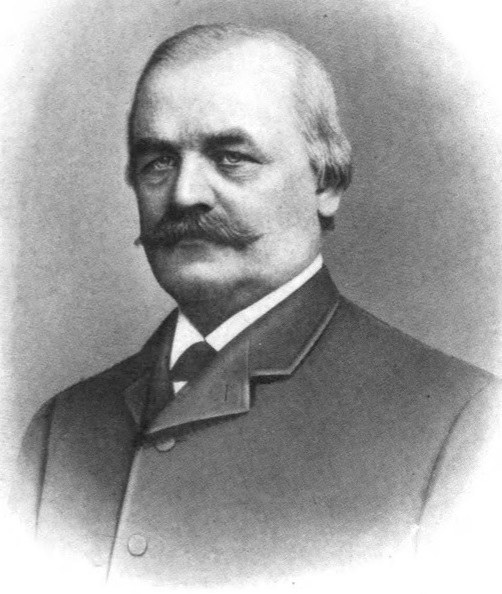
- From Volume 2 (1915) of History of Michigan by Charles Moore

Member of the U.S. House of Representatives from Michigan's 1st district
- In office March 4, 1879 – March 3, 1881
- Preceded by: Alpheus S. Williams
- Succeeded by: Henry W. Lord

Personal details
- Born: November 18, 1826 Waterville, New York, U.S.
- Died: January 2, 1887 (aged 60) Detroit, Michigan, U.S.
- Resting place: Elmwood Cemetery; Detroit, Michigan
- Party: Whig; Republican
- Spouse(s): Harriet N. Robinson; Helen P. Handy Newberry
- Relations: Walter Loomis Newberry; Henry Bourne Joy; James McMillan
- Children: Harrie R. Newberry; Truman Handy Newberry; John S. Newberry; Helen H. Newberry
- Education: University of Michigan
- Profession: Industrialist; Politician

John Stoughton Newberry (November 18, 1826 – January 2, 1887) was an American industrialist and politician. He served as the first provost marshal for the state of Michigan and as a U.S. representative from the state of Michigan.

== Early life ==
Newberry was born in Waterville, New York, the son of Elihu Newberry and Rhoda (Phelps) Newberry. He moved with his parents to Michigan when a child, residing in Detroit, Ann Arbor, and Romeo. He completed preparatory studies at Romeo Academy and graduated from the University of Michigan in 1848 as head of his class. Under the influence of his uncle, Oliver Newberry, he spent two years in civil engineering working with the Michigan Central Railroad building the line from Kalamazoo to New Buffalo. Then he takes a year off traveling mostly by steamboat throughout the Midwest including the Great Lakes, The Ohio, Missouri and Mississippi rivers. While traveling, he is shocked by the number of boat accidents due to the lack of established standards and regulations. Consequently there are a number of expensive, extensive and complicated liability suits.

Upon his return Newberry abandons any more immediate railroad work in favor of studying maritime law in the Detroit law offices of Emmons and Van Dyke. In no time he becomes the acknowledged Midwestern maritime expert, publishing Reports of Admiralty Cases in the Several District Courts of the United States. Newberry wins his first important case, defending Captain Sam Ward, owner of the Ogdenburg, in his case against the Atlantic. He proves himself as the paramount admiralty law litigator in the Midwest and establishes his own law practice in Detroit. While in Buffalo on legal matters, he meets Harriet Newell Robinson, whom he weds in 1856. A son, Harrie, is born the same year. Tragically, ten days later, his wife of less than a year dies. He moved to a downtown hotel and played with the Detroit Base Ball Club for a short time. Three years later while on business in Cleveland, Newberry meets Helen Parmelee Handy, the daughter of prominent banker, Truman Handy. Marrying in 1859, they return to Detroit. Two sons, Truman Handy and John Stoughton Jr., and one daughter, Helen Hall, are born to that union.

== Career ==
He published the first volume of admiralty reports of decisions of cases arising on western lakes and rivers. In the early 1860s, Newberry joined the railroad car manufacturing firm of Dean and Eaton, renaming it Newberry, Dean and Eaton Manufacturing Co. When James McMillan joined the firm in 1864, the company was reorganized as the Michigan Car Company. With McMillan, Newberry also established the Detroit Car Wheel Company. He was appointed the first provost marshal for the State of Michigan by U.S. President Abraham Lincoln in 1862 with the rank of captain of Cavalry. Newberry resigned in 1864 and engaged in several large manufacturing and railroad enterprises.

Newberry was elected as a Republican candidate to the 46th United States Congress, serving Michigan's 1st congressional district from March 4, 1879, to March 3, 1881. He declined to be a candidate for reelection in 1880. He served as director of The Detroit and Cleveland Steam Navigation Company, Detroit, Bay City and Alpena Railroad and the Detroit National Bank.

== Death and legacy ==
Newberry died in Detroit on January 2, 1887, and was interred in Elmwood Cemetery. His funeral was the occasion for many tributes, but the one offered by his old Romeo friend and university classmate was probably the best. Judge J. Logan Chipman eulogized, "With Mr. Newberry, as with all great men, there was indomitable will, energy, the great iron power that characterized his whole life." His estate was worth approximately $4.5 million, with investments in more than fifty different companies. To charitable organizations, he left $650,000.

The village of Newberry, Michigan, is named after Newberry, as a consequence of the congressman's business interest in the Detroit, Mackinac and Marquette Railroad. Several streets within the Village were named after members of Newberry's family.

An impressive Romanesque building was built from native fieldstone on the campus of the University of Michigan between 1888 and 1891. Nearly half of the building's cost was covered by a gift from Helen H. Newberry, and in recognition the building was named Newberry Hall in honor of her husband.

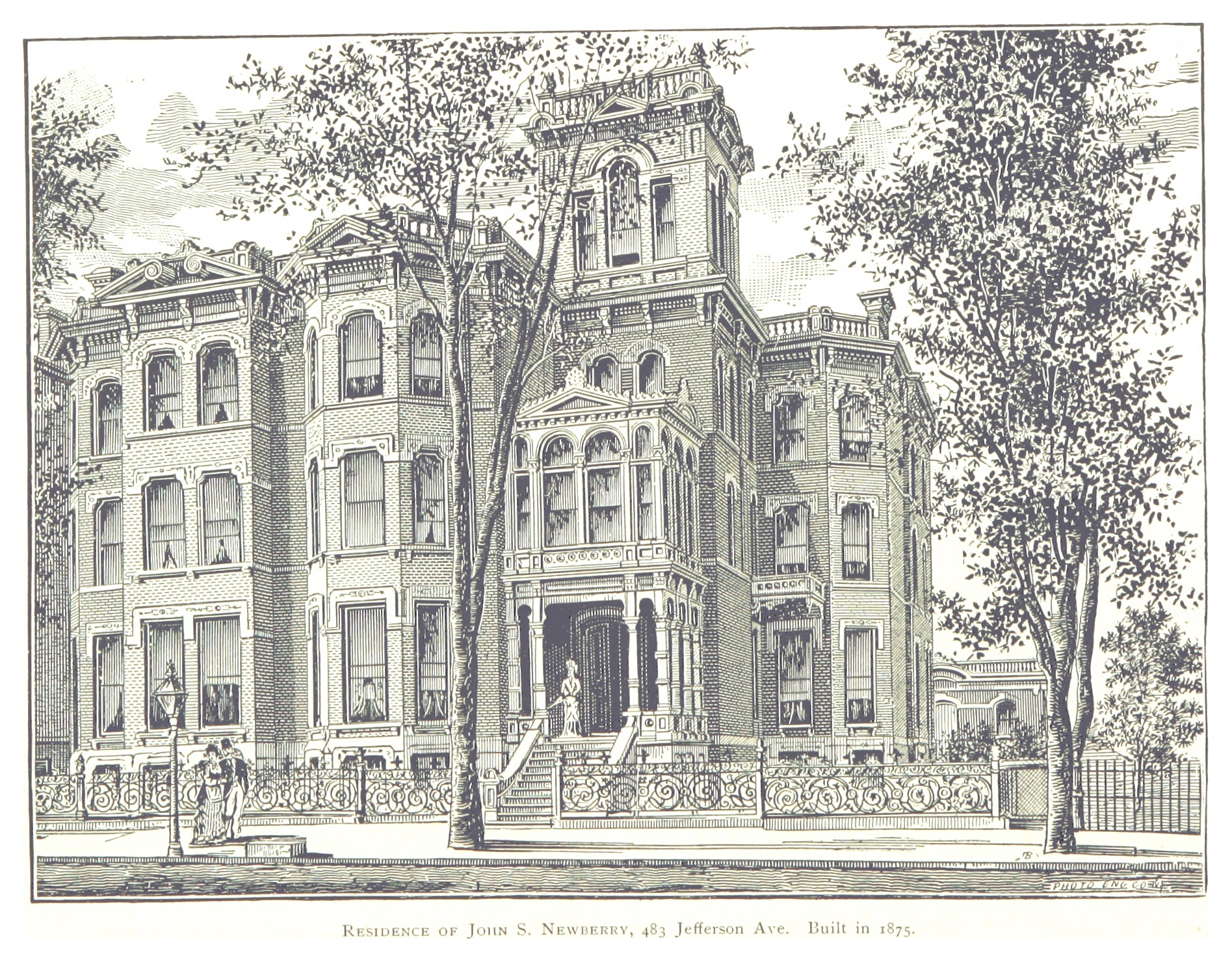
John S Newberry residence, in 1363 East Jefferson, designed by the architect Gordon W Lloyd in 1877, was demolished in 1961.

The landmark Newberry Memorial Organ was constructed in his honor at Yale University, where his son Truman graduated in 1885.

== Family life ==
Newberry was the nephew of Walter Loomis Newberry and Oliver Newberry.

Newberry was married in 1855 to Harriet N. Robinson. She died the following year, 10 days after giving birth to their son Harrie R. Newberry. On October 6, 1859, he married Helen P. Handy, the daughter of Truman P. Handy, a well-known financier and banker in Cleveland. They had three children, Truman Handy Newberry, John S. Newberry and Helen H. Newberry. His daughter was married to Henry Bourne Joy, President of the Packard Motor Car Company.

U.S. House of Representatives
| Preceded by Alpheus S. Williams | United States Representative for the 1st congressional district of Michigan; 1879–1881 | Succeeded by Henry W. Lord |
