= Thomas B. Dunstan =

American politician

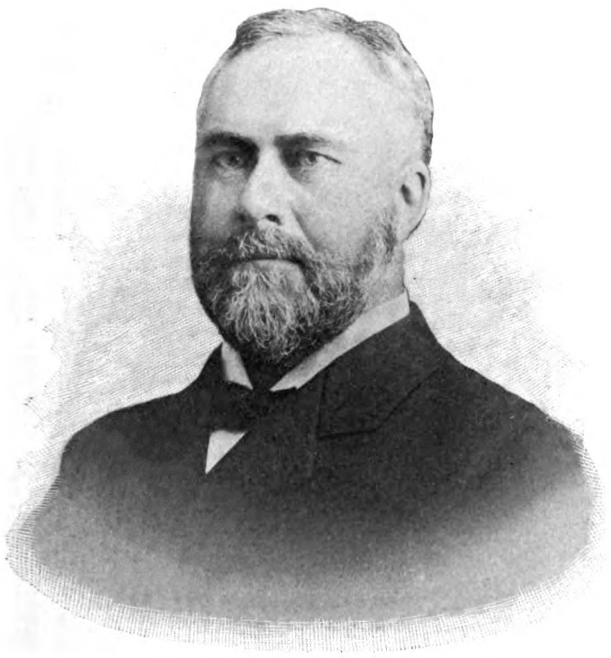

30th Lieutenant Governor of Michigan
- In office January 1, 1897 – January 1, 1899
- Governor: Hazen S. Pingree
- Preceded by: Joseph R. McLaughlin
- Succeeded by: Orrin W. Robinson

Member of the Michigan Senate from the 32nd district
- In office 1889–1890
- Preceded by: Jay Abel Hubbell
- Succeeded by: John H. D. Stevens

Member of the Michigan House of Representatives from the Ontonagon County district
- In office 1883–1884

Personal details
- Born: January 4, 1850 Camborne, Cornwall, England
- Died: May 23, 1902 (aged 52) Chicago, Illinois
- Party: Republican

Thomas B. Dunstan (January 4, 1850 – May 23, 1902) was an American politician who served as the 30th lieutenant governor of Michigan from 1897 to 1899. He previously served in the Michigan House of Representatives from the Ontonagon district from 1883 to 1884 and in the Michigan Senate from the 32nd district from 1889 to 1890. he died at age 52 in Chicago.
