= Aaron T. Bliss =

American politician (1837–1906)

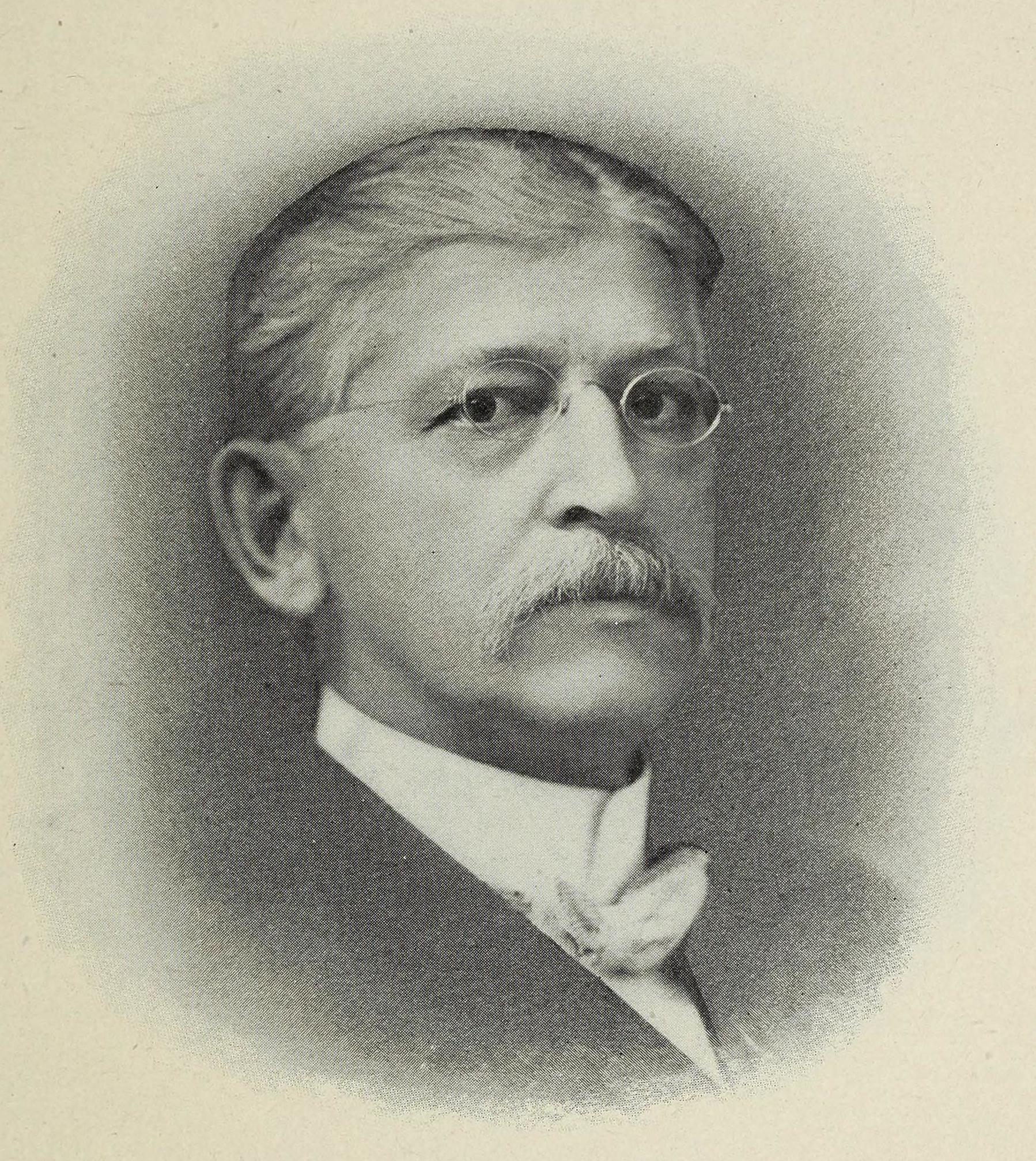

25th Governor of Michigan
- In office January 1, 1901 – January 1, 1905
- Lieutenant: Orrin W. Robinson; Alexander Maitland
- Preceded by: Hazen S. Pingree
- Succeeded by: Fred M. Warner

Member of the U.S. House of Representatives from Michigan's 8th district
- In office March 4, 1889 – March 3, 1891
- Preceded by: Timothy E. Tarsney
- Succeeded by: Henry M. Youmans

Member of the Michigan Senate from the 25th district
- In office 1883–1884
- Preceded by: Henry C. Russell
- Succeeded by: George Davenport

Personal details
- Born: May 22, 1837 Peterboro, New York, U.S.
- Died: September 16, 1906 (aged 69) Milwaukee, Wisconsin, U.S.
- Party: Republican
- Spouse: Allaseba Phelps

Aaron Thomas Bliss (May 22, 1837 – September 16, 1906) was an American politician who served as a U.S. representative and the 25th governor of Michigan, and was from Saginaw. Bliss Township was named after him.

== Early life in New York ==
Bliss was born to Lyman and Anna M. (Chaffee) Bliss in Peterboro, New York and attended the common schools. He was employed as a clerk in a store in Morrisville, New York, in 1853 and 1854 and with the $100 he made there he attended a select school in Munnsville, New York, in 1854. The following year, Bliss moved to Bouckville, a small town in Madison County, New York, where he engaged in mercantile pursuits.

== Civil War ==
During the American Civil War, Bliss enlisted as a private in the Peterman Guards of the Tenth New York Volunteer Cavalry, October 1, 1861, and reported for duty at Elmira, New York. After a quick advancement to lieutenant, his regiment formed a part of Kilpatrick's Brigade and was ordered to the front, joining the Army of the Potomac. He commanded a squadron from Washington, D.C. during the Second Battle of Bull Run and his rank advanced to captain. He also fought in the battle of Fredericksburg, the Wilderness, Petersburg, Ground Squirrel Church, Stony Creek, South Mountain, Falls Church and Warrenton. Then he was captured on General Wilson's raid near Richmond. For six months he was held at the Confederate prisons of Andersonville, Georgia, Charleston, South Carolina, Macon, Georgia, and Columbia, South Carolina, where on November 29, 1864, like the man who would later precede him as governor, Hazen S. Pingree, Bliss escaped from a Confederate prison. He walked near three weeks until he reached General Sherman's army at Savannah, Georgia, just two days before its evacuation. Bliss soon rejoined his own command at Petersburg, Virginia, where he remained until the war ended.

== Life in Michigan ==
In December 1865, he moved to Saginaw, Michigan and found employment at a shingle mill. With his brother, Lyman W. Bliss, and J. H. Jerome, he formed A. T. Bliss & Company and engaged in the manufacture of lumber and the exploitation of lands along the Tobacco River. On March 31, 1868, he married Allaseba Morey Phelps of Solsville, New York, north of the town of Madison. That same spring the brothers bought the Jerome mill at Zilwaukee, and it became A. T. Bliss & Brother. In 1880, Bliss was one of the organizers and a director of the Citizen's National Bank, which was reorganized into the Bank of Saginaw, and was president and director of the Saginaw County Savings Bank.

== Politics ==
In 1882, Bliss was elected member of the Michigan Senate from Saginaw County (25th district), and during that time helped establish a soldiers' home in Grand Rapids. He was appointed aide-de-camp on the staff of Governor Russell A. Alger in 1885, with the rank of colonel, and held the same position on the staff of the commander in chief of the Grand Army of the Republic in 1888.

=== Congress ===
In 1888, Bliss was elected as a Republican from Michigan's 8th congressional district to the 51st Congress, serving from March 4, 1889, to March 3, 1891. Among notable bills he introduced were for appropriating $100,000 for a federal building in Saginaw and $25,000 for an Indian school at Mt. Pleasant. He was an unsuccessful candidate for re-election in 1890 to the 52nd Congress, being defeated by Democrat Henry M. Youmans.

After leaving Congress, Bliss resumed the lumber business and also engaged in banking. He was department commander of the Grand Army of the Republic in Michigan in 1897.

=== Governor ===
In 1900, Bliss was elected Governor of Michigan, defeating mayor of Detroit William C. Maybury, and was re-elected in 1902, serving from 1901 through 1904. During his four years in office, the Michigan Employment Institution for the Adult Blind was established in Saginaw, a state highway department was formed, and railroad taxation was sanctioned.

== Retirement and death ==
Bliss was a patron of the Home for the Friendless, the Y.M.C.A., the Methodist Church and was also a member of the Freemasons and Knights Templar.

Bliss died less than two years after leaving office at the age of sixty-nine in Milwaukee, Wisconsin, while on a visit for medical treatment. He is interred in Forest Lawn Cemetery in Saginaw, Michigan.

== Sources ==
Mills, James Cooke (2005) [1892]. "s.v. Aaron T. Bliss". History of Saginaw County, Michigan. Saginaw, Mich.: Seemann & Peters. pp. 24–28.

- United States Congress. "Aaron T. Bliss (id: B000557)". Biographical Directory of the United States Congress. Retrieved on February 14, 2008
- The Political Graveyard
- Bliss Family History Society
- National Governors Association
- Michigan Legislative Biography

Party political offices
Preceded by Hazen S. Pingree	Republican nominee for Governor of Michigan; 1900, 1902	Succeeded by Fred M. Warner
U.S. House of Representatives
Preceded by Timothy E. Tarsney	United States Representative for the 8th congressional district of Michigan; 1889–1891	Succeeded by Henry M. Youmans
Political offices
Preceded by Hazen S. Pingree	Governor of Michigan; 1901–1905	Succeeded by Fred M. Warner
