= Timothy E. Tarsney =

American lawyer and politician

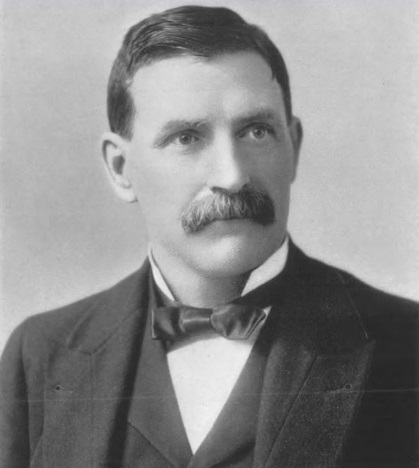
- From 1897's Bench and Bar of Michigan: A Volume of History and Biography.

Member of the U.S. House of Representatives from Michigan's 8th district
- In office March 4, 1885 – March 3, 1889
- Preceded by: Roswell G. Horr
- Succeeded by: Aaron T. Bliss

Personal details
- Born: February 4, 1849 Ransom, Michigan
- Died: June 8, 1909 (aged 60) Detroit, Michigan
- Party: Democratic Party
- Education: University of Michigan
- Profession: Lawyer

Timothy Edward Tarsney (February 4, 1849 – June 8, 1909) was an American lawyer and politician from the U.S. state of Michigan. He served two terms in the United States House of Representatives from 1885 to 1889.

== Early life and education ==
Tarsney was born in Ransom, Michigan and attended the common and high schools. He worked on the Government roads in Tennessee until the end of the Civil War. When he returned to Michigan, he settled in Saginaw, where he was employed as a sawmill engineer and became a marine engineer in 1867. He graduated from the law department of the University of Michigan at Ann Arbor in 1872 and was admitted to the bar the same year, commencing practice in East Saginaw.

He was elected justice of the peace in 1873 and city attorney from 1875 to 1878, when he resigned. His brother, John Charles Tarsney, was also a U.S. Representative from Missouri. His sister Mary E. Tarsney married Thomas A. E. Weadock who became a U.S. representative from Michigan after her death.

== Congress ==
In 1880, Tarsney was an unsuccessful candidate for election to the 47th United States Congress, losing to Roswell G. Horr. He was a delegate at-large to the Democratic National Convention in 1884. That year, he defeated Horr to be elected as a Democrat from Michigan's 8th congressional district to the 49th Congress. He defeated Horr again to be re-elected to the 50th Congress, serving from March 4, 1885 to March 3, 1889. He was an unsuccessful candidate for re-election in 1888, losing to Aaron T. Bliss.

== Career after Congress ==
Tarsney moved to Detroit in 1893 and resumed the practice of law. He served on the corporation counsel of Detroit from 1900 to 1908.

The following year, he died at the age of sixty in Detroit and is interred in Calvary Cemetery in Saginaw, Michigan.

U.S. House of Representatives
Preceded by Roswell G. Horr	United States Representative for the 8th congressional district of Michigan; 1885 – 1889	Succeeded by Aaron T. Bliss
