= Hazen S. Pingree =

American politician

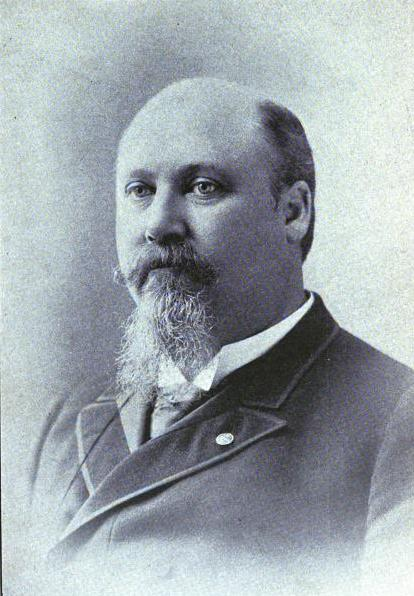

24th Governor of Michigan
- In office January 1, 1897 – January 1, 1901
- Lieutenant: Thomas B. Dunstan; Orrin W. Robinson
- Preceded by: John T. Rich
- Succeeded by: Aaron T. Bliss

43rd Mayor of Detroit
- In office 1889–1897
- Preceded by: John Pridgeon Jr.
- Succeeded by: William Richert

Personal details
- Born: August 30, 1840 Denmark, Maine, U.S.
- Died: June 18, 1901 (aged 60) London, England
- Party: Republican
- Spouse: Frances Gilbert

Hazen Stuart Pingree (August 30, 1840 – June 18, 1901) was an American politician and businessman who was the 43rd mayor of Detroit from 1889 to 1897 and the 24th governor of Michigan from 1897 to 1901. A Yankee who migrated from New England, he was a successful Republican businessman turned politician.

Pingree was elected mayor in 1889 after a colorful campaign in which his revealed his tolerance by making a circuit of saloons. Pingree added to the old stock Yankee Republican base by making large inroads into the German and Canadian elements. He was reelected in 1891, 1893 and 1895. Warning repeatedly against the dangers of monopolistic corporations, he launched nationally visible crusades against Detroit's streetcar, gas, electric, and telephone companies. He successfully forced rate reductions that won him widespread popularity. He won public approval for a citizen-owned electric light plant and became a national spokesman for municipal ownership and public regulation of utilities and street railways.

When the nationwide Panic of 1893 caused a severe depression, Pingree gained support by opening empty lots to garden farming launching Pingree's "Potato Patch Plan", initially financed by Pingree, who sold his prize horse to pay for the farming tools and seeds. Pingree was a Republican, whose policies competed for support of the Populist Party voters and labor union members. He supported the gold standard in 1896, and worked to carry Michigan for William McKinley over silverite William Jennings Bryan in the intensely competitive 1896 U.S. presidential election.

Pingree was on the ballot too, and was elected governor of Michigan. As governor, he succeeded in forcing passage of the nation's first major statewide reappraisal of railroad and corporate property, with intent on implementing taxes. That led to a rational basis for railroad regulation and other trust busting ideas launched by the Republican Party. A survey of scholars in 1985 ranked Pingree as the third-best mayor in all of American history.

== Early life in Maine and Massachusetts ==
Pingree was born in Denmark, Maine, to Jasper Pingree and Adeline (Bryant) Pingree and attended the common schools in Maine. At the age of fourteen, he moved to Saco, Maine, where he worked at a cotton factory. Two years later, he moved to Hopkinton, Massachusetts, and worked several years as a cutter in a shoe factory.

== Civil War ==
In 1862, Pingree enlisted in the Union Army to serve in the Civil War with the 1st Massachusetts Heavy Artillery Regiment (Company F). He fought on the front line during General Pope's Northern Virginia Campaign and the Second Battle of Bull Run. The regiment in which he fought was then ordered to defend Washington, D.C., until May 15, 1864, and then was sent to the front again. He fought with the Second Brigade of Tyler's Division, Second Corps, which participated in battles at Fredericksburg Road (May 18), Harris Farm (May 19), and Spotsylvania Court House (May 19–21).

His regiment was then assigned to the Second Corps, Third Division, in the Army of the Potomac and fought at North Anna (May 24–25) where he and some other men were captured by a detachment of John S. Mosby's command. Pingree was confined in Confederate prisons at Gordonsville and Lynchburg, Virginia, and at Salisbury, North Carolina. He was then taken to Andersonville prison and, while General Sherman was on his march to the sea, he was taken to Millen, Georgia, where he later escaped by pretending to be someone else during a roll call for a prisoner exchange in November 1864. Pingree rejoined his regiment, fought in many more battles, and was present at Appomattox Court House when Robert E. Lee surrendered on April 9, 1865. A few months later, on August 15, his regiment was mustered out.

== Business in Michigan ==
Pingree was a cobbler by trade and, following the war, moved to Detroit and briefly worked for Henry Porter Baldwin's shoe company. In 1866, Pingree and his accountant, Charles H. Smith, purchased Baldwin's shoe-making machinery and formed the Pingree and Smith company. In 1883, Smith retired from the firm and J. B. Howarth and Pingree's son Joe joined the partnership. By 1886, it was a $1 million company with 700 employees turning out a half-million shoes and boots a year. It was the second biggest shoe manufacturer in the U.S. In March 1887, a fire destroyed the entire plant, yet they were able to recover.

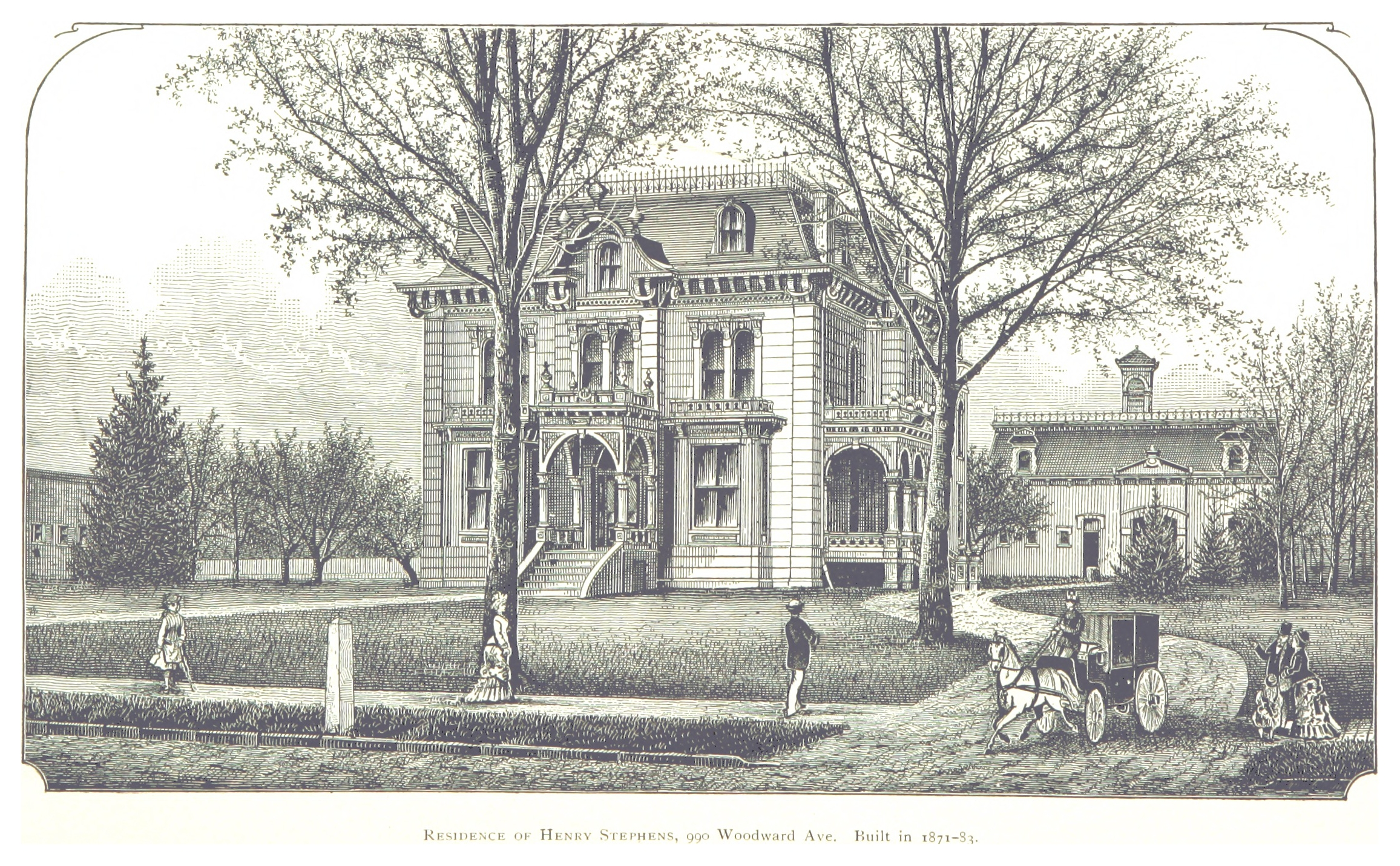
This residence in 5054 Woodward Avenue was built in 1871 for James Wallace and later sold to Henry Stephens who sold it to Hazen S Pingree in the 1890s, the house was demolished in 1919.

In 1872, Pingree married Frances A. Gilbert of Mount Clemens, Michigan. They had three children – Joe, Hazel, and Gertrude, who died in 1894 of tuberculosis at age 19.

== Mayor of Detroit ==
Pingree had never been active in politics. As a citizen reformer he was elected mayor of Detroit in 1889 on a platform of exposing and ending corruption in city paving contracts, sewer contracts, and the school board. He soon turned to fighting privately owned utility monopolies. He challenged the electric and gas monopolies through municipally owned competitors. His largest struggle, however, was with Tom L. Johnson, president of the Detroit City Railway, over lowering streetcar fares to three cents. Pingree again attempted to create a competing municipally owned company, but was barred from creating a railway by the Michigan Constitution. When the company sought a thirty-year contract with the city, Pingree opposed it, leading a major shareholder, James McMillan, to express vehement disapproval.

During the severe nationwide depression of 1893, Pingree expanded the public welfare programs, initiated public works for the unemployed, built new schools, parks, and public baths. He gained national recognition through his "potato patch plan", which allowed poor people to use 430 acres (170 ha) of vacant city land for growing food. He was also an advocate of economist Henry George's single tax.

A 1993 survey of historians, political scientists and urban experts conducted by Melvin G. Holli of the University of Illinois at Chicago saw Pingree ranked as the fourth-best mayor of a major American city to serve between the years 1820 and 1993.

== Governor of Michigan ==
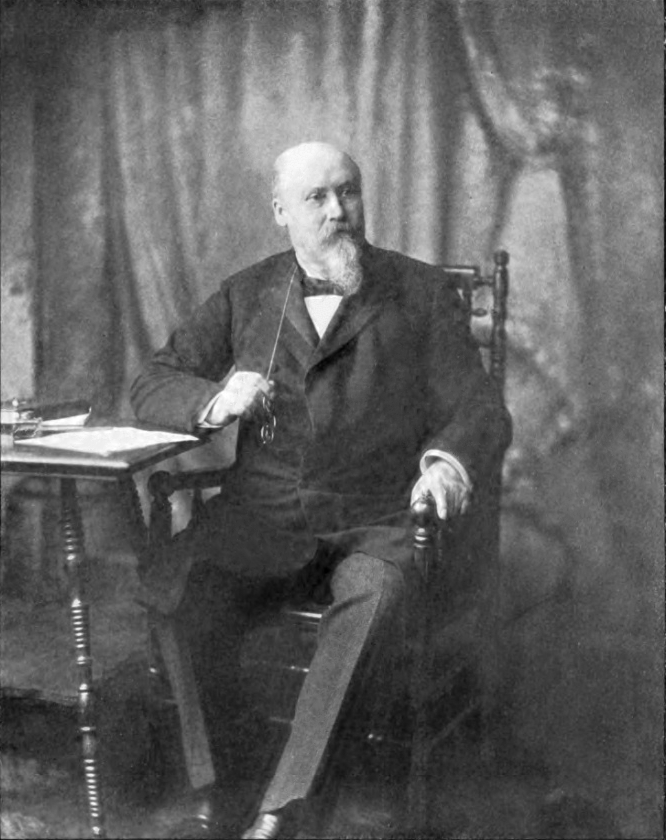
Pingree c. 1900

In 1896 Pingree was nominated as the GOP candidate for Governor of Michigan. He campaigned on a platform of pluralism, inviting the Germans and other ethnics to join a grand coalition that would bring prosperity to everyone, unlike the false prosperity promised by the silverites. He carried the state both for himself and Republican presidential candidate William McKinley.

After taking office on January 1, 1897, he intended to also fill the last year of his term as mayor of Detroit, which would have lasted until elections in November 1897. However, his right to hold the two offices simultaneously was contested, and after the Michigan Supreme Court ruled against him, Pingree resigned as mayor.

During his four years in office, Pingree promoted the regulation of railroad rates, equal taxation, and municipal ownership of public utilities. He also supported the direct election of U.S. senators; an eight-hour workday; an income tax; primary elections; the power of "referendum", the abolition of child labor, and compulsory arbitration of labor disputes. Opposition from Democrats and business-oriented Republicans blocked most of his proposals. Pingree expressed the Progressive fear of corporate power, saying, "I do not condemn corporations and rich men", he said, "but I would keep them within their proper spheres. It is not safe to entrust the government of the country to the influence of Wall Street."

== Death ==
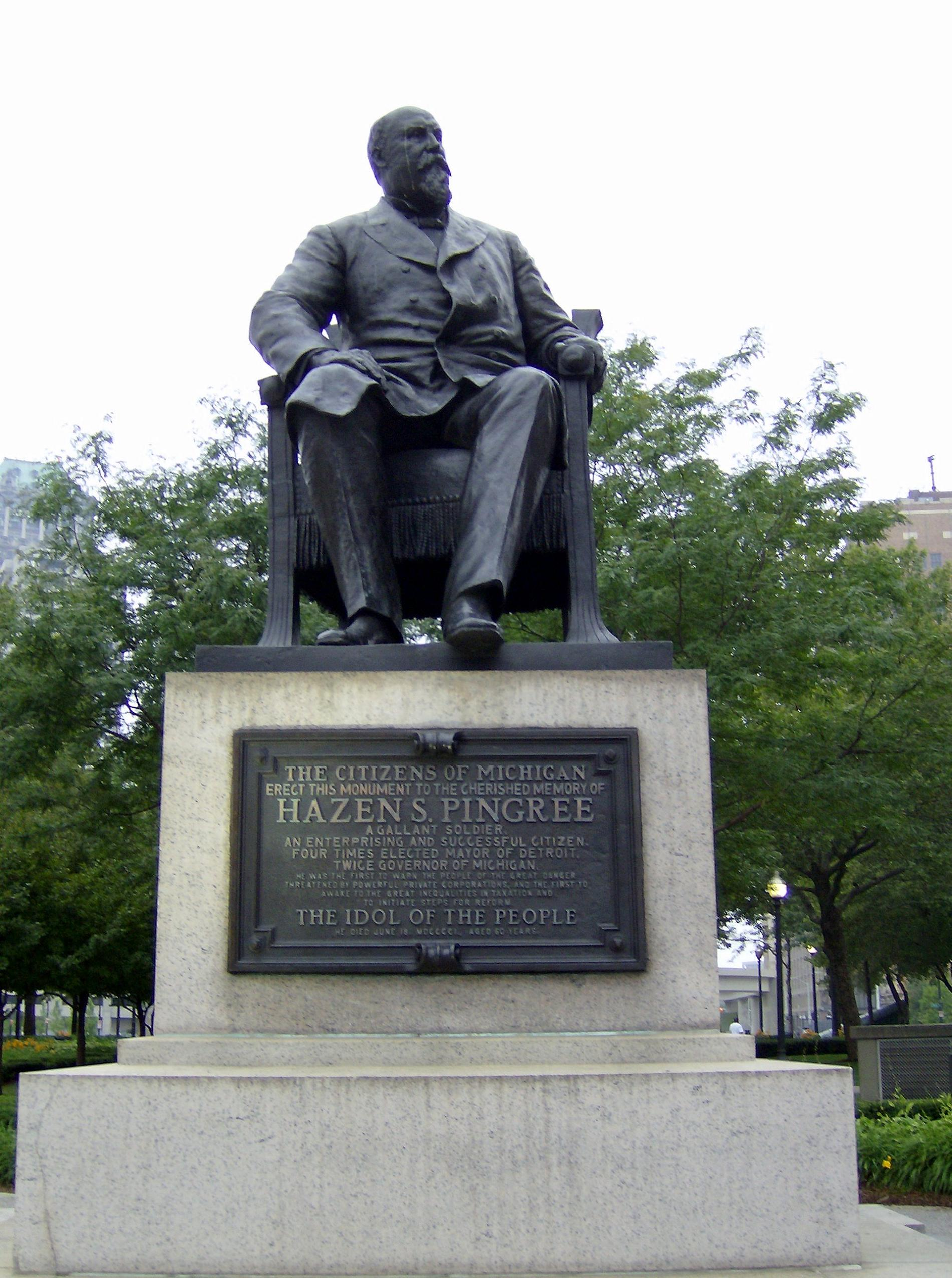
Statue of Pingree in Grand Circus Park, Detroit.

Pingree did not run for reelection in 1900. In 1901, Pingree arrived in London, England, while returning from an African safari with his son. He was stricken with peritonitis and was unable to return to the U.S. King Edward VII, Pingree's famous look alike, even sent his own physicians to London's Grand Hotel to assist in Pingree's recovery.

Pingree was interred at the Elmwood Cemetery, Detroit, Michigan, and later reinterred at the Woodlawn Cemetery in Detroit. A statue of Pingree stands in the Grand Circus Park in Detroit, commemorating him as "The Idol of the People". The sculpture was made by Austrian sculptor Rudolph Schwarz.

There is also a bronze bust of him on the thirteenth floor of the Coleman A. Young Municipal Building in Detroit.

== See also ==
- Grand Circus Park

Party political offices
Preceded by John T. Rich	Republican nominee for Governor of Michigan; 1896, 1898	Succeeded by Aaron T. Bliss
Political offices
Preceded by John Pridgeon Jr.	Mayor of Detroit; 1889–1897	Succeeded by William Richert
Preceded by John T. Rich	Governor of Michigan; 1897–1901	Succeeded by Aaron T. Bliss
