= Wild Bill Shrewsberry =

American racing driver (1938–2025)

- Born: Billy Lewis Shrewsberry; June 26, 1938; Mansfield, Ohio, U.S.
- Died: February 19, 2025 (age 86)
- Occupation: Dragster driver
- Known for: Driving stunts

Billy Lewis "Wild Bill" Shrewsberry (June 26, 1938 – February 19, 2025) was an American exhibition drag racing driver primarily active throughout the 1960s and 1970s. Originally from Mansfield, Ohio, Shrewsberry moved to Southern California in October 1962. Shrewsberry is best known as the driver of the drag racing replica of the Barris-built Batmobile from the 1966 television series and of the L.A. Dart, a series of wheelstanding Dodge Dart funny cars, each with a rear-mounted, supercharged Chrysler Hemi engine, sponsored by the Dodge and Plymouth dealers of Los Angeles and Orange Counties. The result of the rearward weight transfer caused by the engine's mounting position was a "wheelie" for the entire quarter-mile at speeds exceeding 100 miles per hour (160 km/h). Steering was accomplished by a combination of the service brake pedal activating the brake on the left wheel while a brake lever from a racing go-kart activated the right brake. So proficient was Shrewsberry at this sort of driving that he would often spin his car to face the opposite direction at the end of the track and race back to the starting line, all the while maintaining the wheelstand.

Shrewsberry rose to fame in the early 1960s as the driver of one of only six factory-built 1963 Pontiac Tempest Super Duty LeMans-badged coupes, campaigned by Mickey Thompson. These six coupes and six station wagons, with their 421 cu in (6.9 L) Pontiac Catalina engines, transmissions and rear ends replacing the Tempest's 326 cu in (5.3 L) engine, rear-mounted Corvair-based transaxle and the small diameter drive shaft often referred to as a "rope" were described as "beyond fast". Shrewsberry's Pontiac dominated the A/FX class in the 1963 Winternationals with a best time of 12.03 seconds in the quarter mile, an average of .5 seconds faster than the competition. He would later race the car in a modified configuration utilizing Pontiac's Powershift transaxle, developed specifically for the Super Duty. It was, in essence, a pair of two-speed Powerglide automatic transmissions joined together in a single four-speed unit. His car retains that setup today.

Shrewsberry also helped develop and pilot the Hurst Hemi Under Glass Plymouth Barracuda, as well as the 1969 Car Craft Magazine giveaway Dodge Dart Swinger painted by the legendary George Barris. He also participated in the development of the Dodge Little Red Wagon driven by Bill "Maverick" Golden and the Hurst Hairy Olds Oldsmobile 4-4-2 exhibition dragsters each sponsored by Hurst Performance. Like L.A. Dart, the Little Red Wagon and Hemi Under Glass were wheelstanders while the Hurst Hairy Olds had engines both front and rear, each powering an automatic transaxle from an Oldsmobile Toronado.

Shrewsberry's 1970 L.A. Dart was the subject of a 1/25-scale plastic model kit first produced by Model Products Corporation and since reissued by Model King using the original tooling. That same car, updated for the 1971 season with a 1971 front grille is still owned by Shrewsberry and is undergoing restoration at his son's home in Ridgecrest. Model kits of the Hemi Under Glass and Hurst Hairy Olds were available as well; the Plymouth was replicated by MPC and Aurora Plastics Corporation while the Olds was available as a kit from Monogram. In the late 1990s, a 1/64-scale diecast model of the L.A. Dart was issued by Johnny Lightning. Presently, die-cast model manufacturer Highway 61 produces a 1/18-scale replica of Shrewsberry's Super Duty Tempest (which Highway 61 designers used as the actual basis for the model) as well as the 1966 Hemi Under Glass and 1966 Hurst Hairy Olds. In 1979, Shrewsberry exhibited a fiberglass 1930 Ford Model A delivery truck sponsored by Knott's Berry Farm. Dubbed The Berry Wagon and painted by custom car builder Ed Roth, the hemi-powered wheelstander was capable of more than 120 miles per hour (190 km/h) in the quarter-mile, again on its rear bumper.

He maintained a small but important collection of automobiles. In addition to the 1970–71 L.A. Dart, Shrewsberry owned his 1972 L.A. Dart funny car with flip-up body, his original 1963 Super Duty Tempest (one of only four remaining), the 1965 Hemi Under Glass Barracuda, the Knott's Berry Wagon, a 1964 Mercury Comet Caliente 427 which he raced in A/FX that year with Jack Chrisman (one of only 50 built and similar to Ford's Fairlane Thunderbolt), a factory lightweight 1964 Ford Galaxie and until its sale to a collector/dealer in 2010, a 1966 Ford Mustang GT convertible. Purchased new for US$2871.00, the Mustang is a highly optioned black-on-black car with a high-performance 289 cu in (4.7 L) engine, four-speed manual transmission, manual front disc brakes, limited-slip differential, deluxe "pony" interior, styled steel wheels, center console and the "lighting group" package which added underhood and trunk lighting. It is also fitted with an extremely rare 8000 RPM Rally-Pac tachometer and clock accessory. The car is in nearly original condition, having accumulated slightly more than 74,000 miles (119,000 km) since new. This was due in large part to his relationship with Dodge the following year.

After retiring from racing, Shrewsberry maintained a relationship with the NHRA museum in Pomona and was often a keynote speaker at car club meets. He resided in the Coachella Valley where he pursued a hobby in model aviation.

Shrewsberry died on February 19, 2025 from natural causes, at the age of 86.
