= Hurst Hairy Olds =

Pair of exhibition funny cars

Hurst Hairy Olds is the name given to a pair of exhibition Top Fuel funny cars campaigned by Hurst Performance in 1966 and 1967.

Developed with help from General Motors engineer John Beltz, the Hurst Hairy Olds was built to be a showcase for the then-new chain-driven automatic transaxle of the 1966 Oldsmobile Toronado as well as a rival to the Hurst Hemi Under Glass. There were doubts in the automotive press as to the strength of such a system; the Hairy Olds was designed to dispel these doubts.

The car debuted at a meet in Bakersfield, California on March 4, 1966. Driven by Joe Schubeck, the Hurst Hairy Olds began as a fully trimmed and later upholstered Oldsmobile 442 in body in white (BIW) form. Hurst installed not one but two 425 in³ (7 L) Oldsmobile engines and Toronado transaxles both front and rear; a pair of drag parachutes were mounted in the stock taillight positions and four-wheel disc brakes were fitted as well. Two engines meant two of virtually everything in the cockpit related to the operation of the car, including two cable-operated shifters, two tachometers, two sets of oil pressure and temperature gauges and even two accelerator pedals. Additional power was provided via a Cragar Equipment-modified 6-71 GMC supercharger atop each engine. The car ran on a blend of nitromethane and alcohol. Weight was reduced through the use of aluminum body components and Plexiglas windows. The result was a 2,400 hp (2,400 PS; 1,800 kW) four wheel drive exhibition drag racer which smoked its front and rear tires down the length of the race track with elapsed times in the eleven-second range.

The Hairy Olds was on the cover of May 1965's Hot Rod.

Although the drive chains held up admirably, the car was not without its problems. The tremendous amount of power at the front wheels caused massive torque steer, resulting in difficulty in keeping the car in a straight line. The rear engine contributed to unloading of the front wheels, which in turn caused the front engine to overspeed. Visibility was poor as well due to tire smoke from both ends of the car. This coupled with engine oil spray out of the valve cover breathers because of the pressure of the superchargers.

A second Hurst Hairy Olds was built in 1967, but was wrecked during an exhibition race in Niagara, New York.

The 1967 car was the subject of one of the most popular model kits of the 1960s, a 1/24 version produced by Monogram.

The 1966 car presently resides at the R.E. Olds Transportation Museum in Lansing, Michigan; the wrecked 1967 car was shipped back to Hurst Performance and dismantled.
