= Oldsmobile Hurst/Olds =

Special-edition performance cars

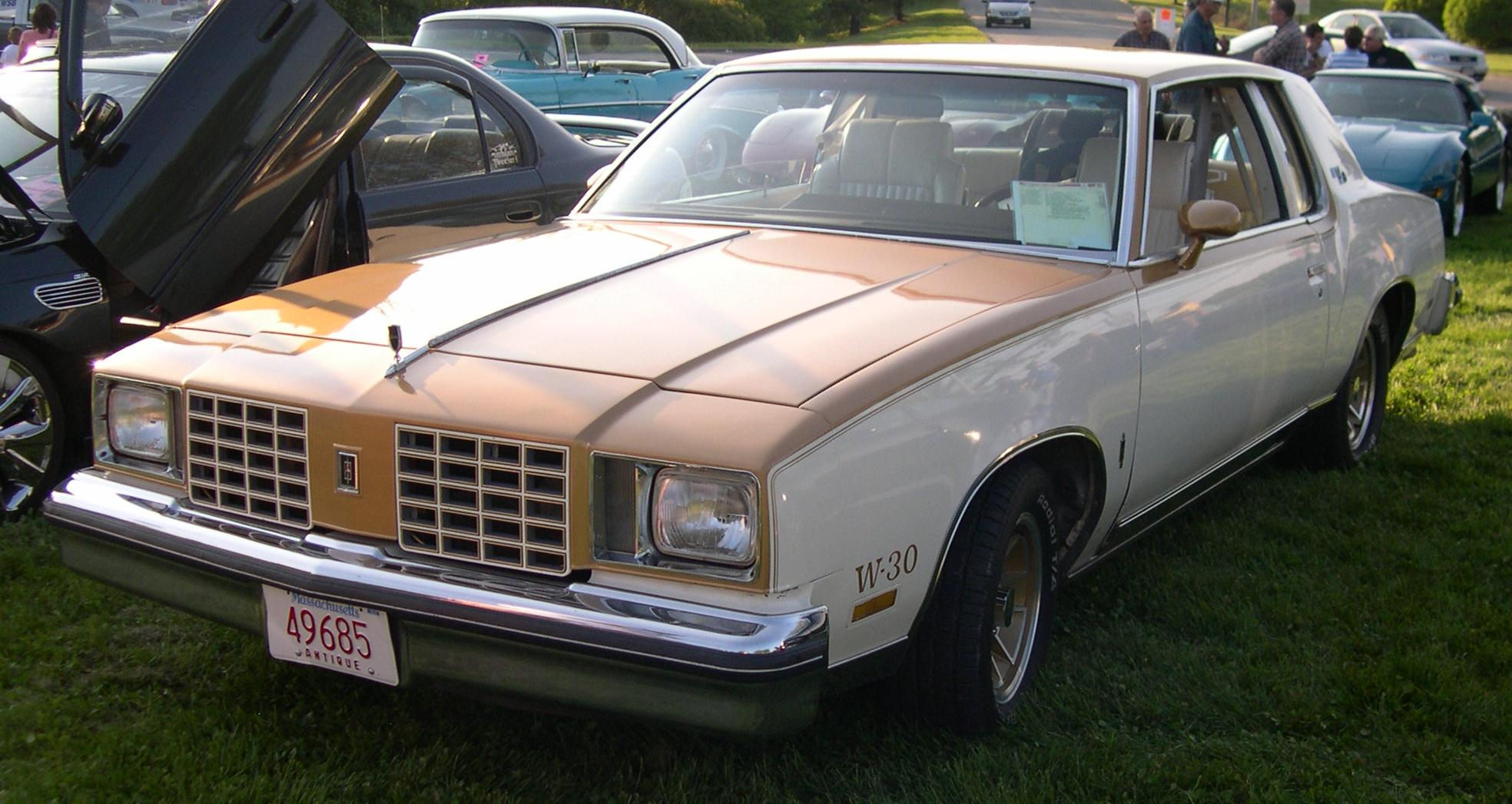
1979 Hurst/Olds W-30

Following the success of Hurst components in Oldsmobile's 442 models, Oldsmobile, in collaboration with Hurst Performance of Warminster, Pennsylvania, produced special-edition performance versions of the 442 or Cutlass Supreme, the Hurst/Olds.

== 1968 ==
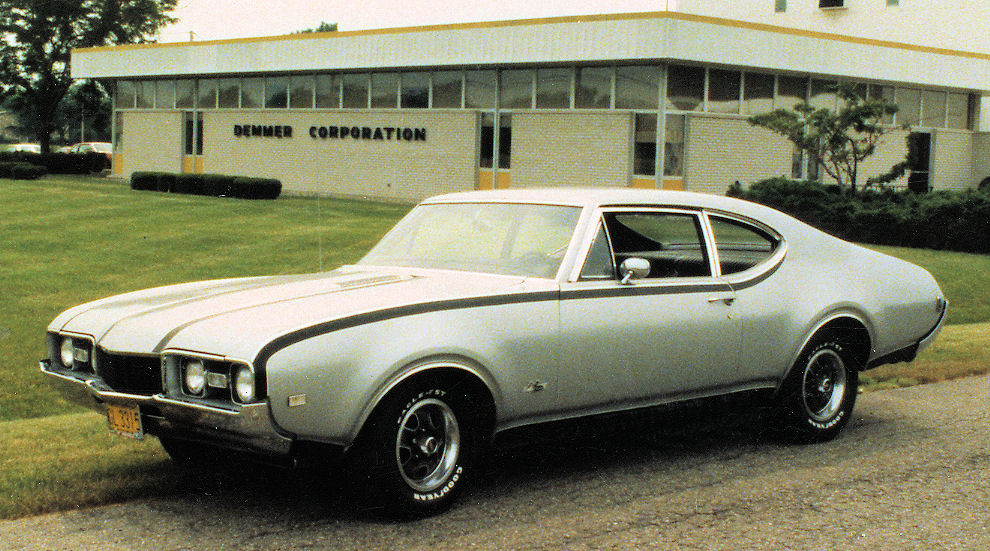
1968 Hurst/Olds Sport Coupe at Demmer

The first Hurst/Olds was the 1968 Hurst/Olds. It shared its body with the regular Oldsmobile Cutlass and 442, but had a unique Peruvian Silver and Black paint scheme. The Hurst/Olds was powered by a 390 hp (395 PS; 291 kW) @ 5000 rpm and a maximum torque of 500 lb⋅ft (678 N⋅m) @ 3200 rpm, 308° duration cam W-45 (without A/C) or 285/287° duration cam W-46 (with A/C), with a displacement of 455 cu in (7.5 L) Rocket V8, equipped with a single 4-barrel Rochester Quadrajet 4GC carburetor. This engine was similar to the 400 hp (406 PS; 298 kW) W-34 455 engine offered in the Toronado and the 390 hp (395 PS; 291 kW) W-33 455 option available on the full-sized Delta 88. The W-45 and the milder W-46 engines differed in camshaft and cylinder head selection. The 455 was mated to a code OW three-speed Turbo-Hydramatic 400 transmission with console-mounted Hurst Dual-Gate shifter that permitted automatic or manually ratcheted shifting.

515 production examples of the 1968 model were built in 2 body styles. There were 51 Sport coupes and 464 Holiday coupes manufactured.

The Hurst/Olds was the only GM intermediate-sized car to offer an engine larger than 400 cu in (6.6 L) thanks to a corporate policy at that time which prohibited the divisions from putting larger engines in cars smaller than full-sized models other than the Chevrolet Corvette. Oldsmobile got around the 400 cubic-inch limit by implying that the engines were installed by Hurst, not Olds. In fact, the special drivetrain and ram-air package (shared with the W-30 and W-31) was installed at the factory. The cars were then taken across town (Lansing, Michigan) to Demmer Engineering where the remainder of the unique Hurst components were added. This included black accent paint with hand-applied white pinstripes, real walnut dash trim, H/O emblems, and Dual Gate shifter and mini-console.

== 1969 ==
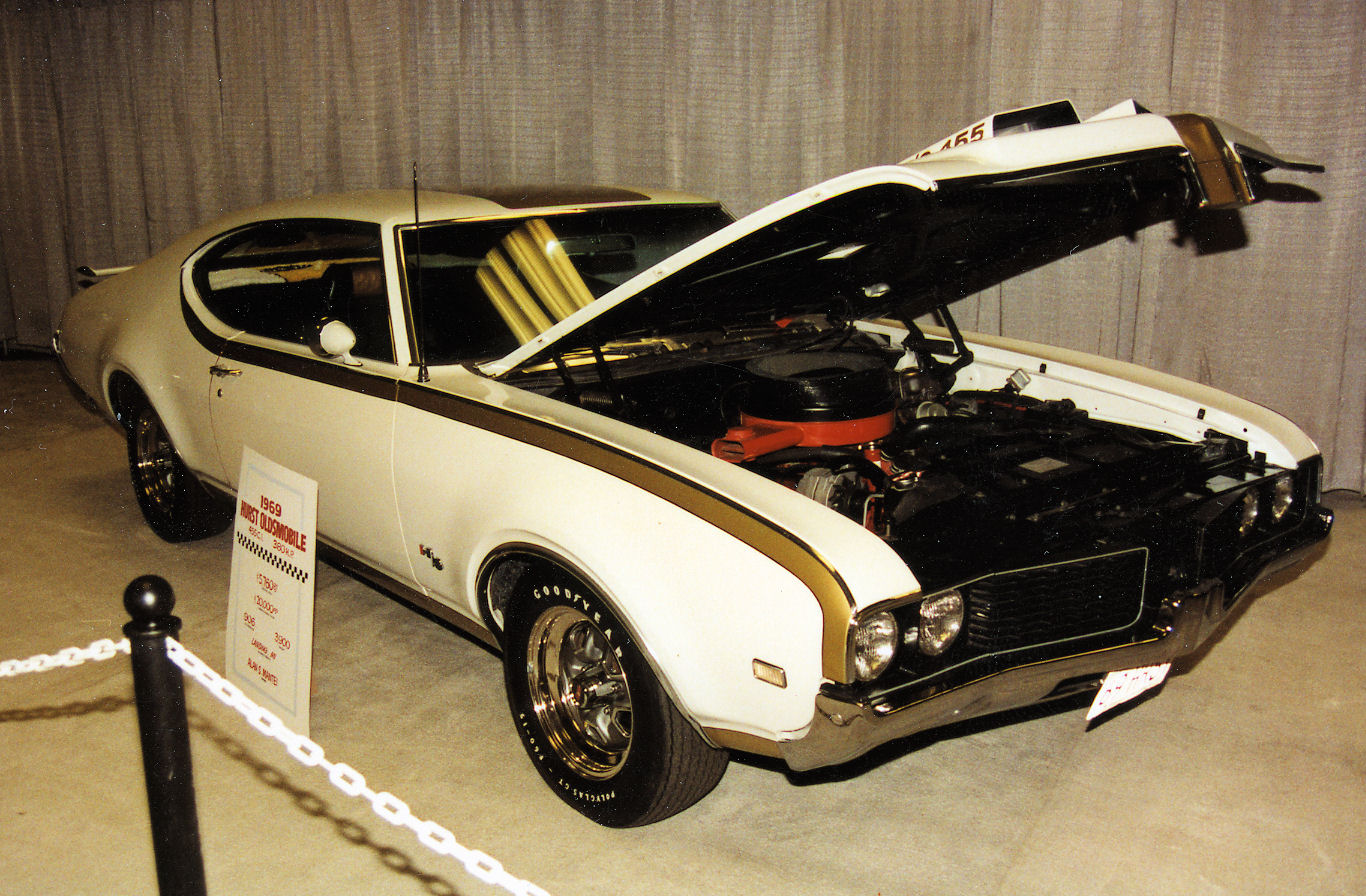
1969 Hurst/Olds

The Hurst/Olds returned for the 1969 model year. The biggest change was the switch from the silver and black paint scheme of '68 to a new Firefrost gold on white paint scheme. This would be the primary paint scheme for many Hurst/Olds models of later years. Instead of the dual ram air scoops under the front bumper that was used in '68 and other ram air '69s, the H/O received a functional "mailbox" fiberglass hood scoop with H/O 455 on each side. A spoiler was mounted on the trunk and the car sat on unique 15x7 chrome SSII rims with Goodyear F60x15 Polyglas tires. The exterior was finished off with a pair of English racing mirrors, H/O emblems on the front fenders and deck lid, blacked out 442 grilles, and black hand-applied pinstripes. All of the '68 and '69 H/Os were pinstriped by one person. Interior modifications included a different wood veneer on the mini-console, painted gold stripes on the headrests, and a Hurst/Olds emblem on the glove-box door. The non-drive train modifications were again done at Demmer Engineering. Approximately 913 cars were built including 2 convertibles for Hurst promotional use, one for East coast events and one for West coast events(a third was built after one of the original two was destroyed).

The 455 cubic-inch Rocket V8 (W46) was rated at 380 horsepower (280 kW) and 500 lb/ft of torque. This is the same engine as A/C equipped 68 Hurst Olds' and provided better drivability. The same engine was used for both A/C and non-A/C cars. The engine received a unique intake manifold, chrome steel valve covers, and a special vacuum operated air cleaner lid to allow cold air from the hood scoop into the carburetor. This was backed up by a specially calibrated code OH Turbo 400 transmission and 3.42 gears for non-A/C cars or 3.08 gears for cars with A/C. Optional 3.91 gears were available only for non-A/C cars.

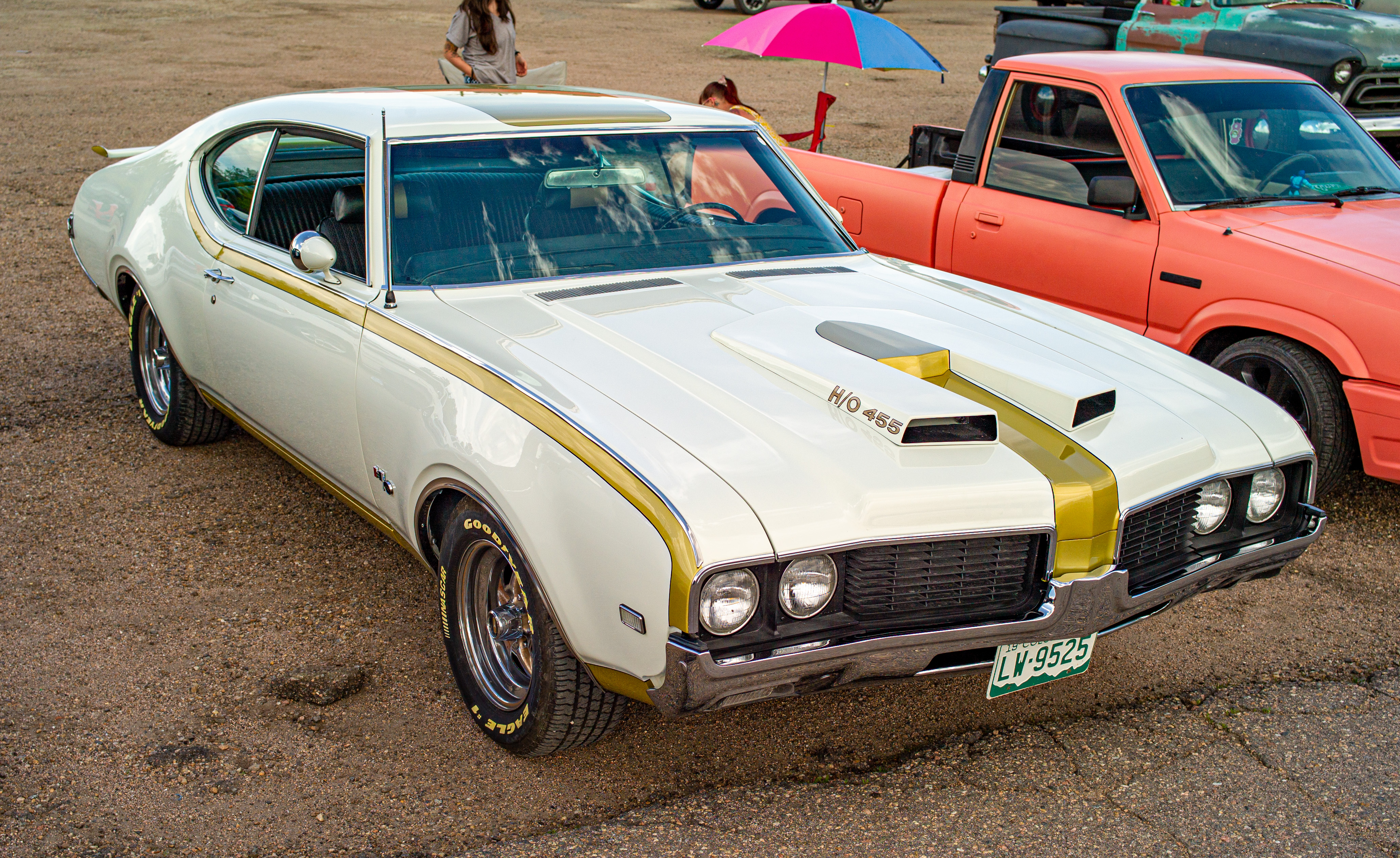
1969 Hurst Olds

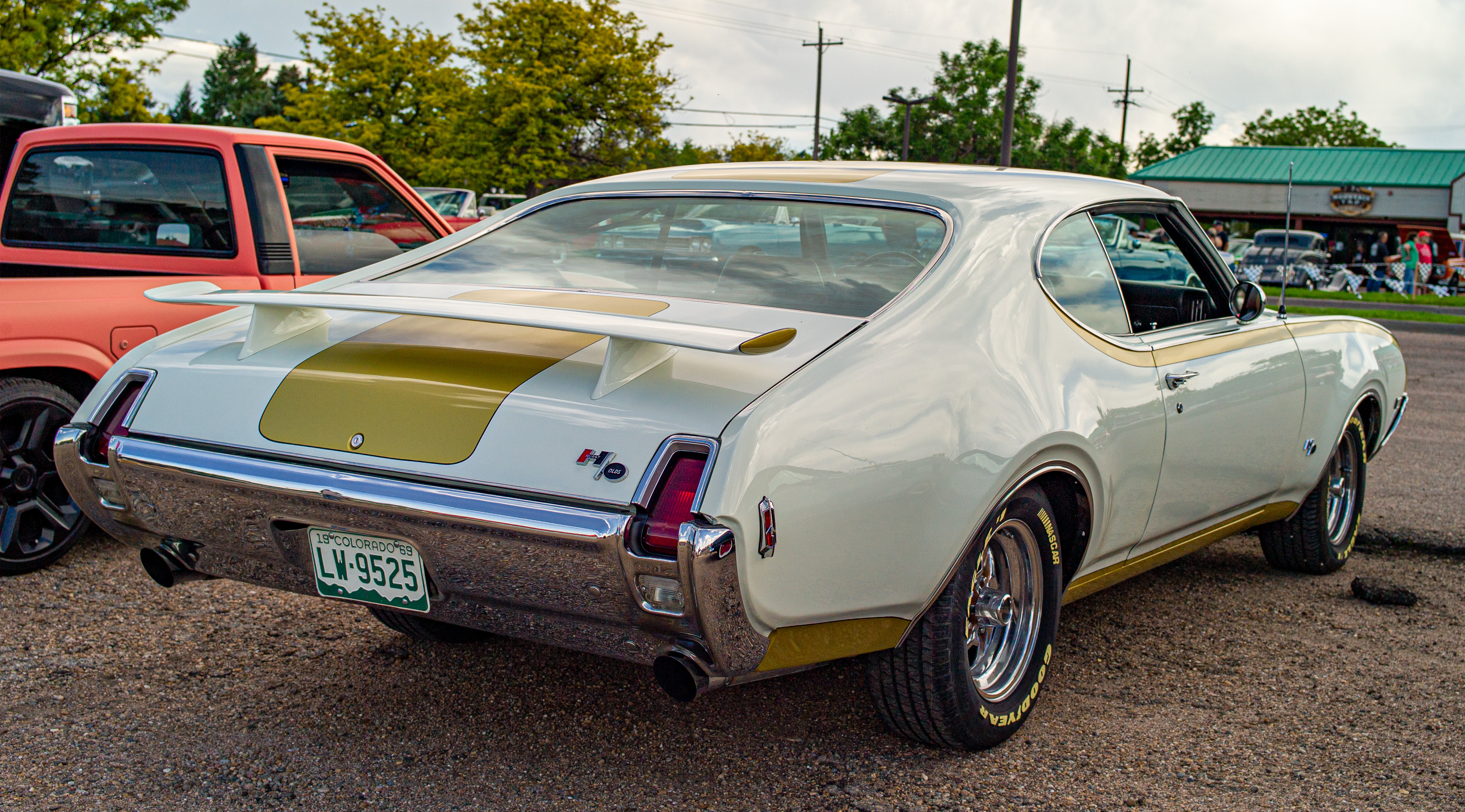
1969 Hurst Olds

The Hurst/Olds was temporarily dropped after the 1969 model year because GM dropped the 400 cubic-inch engine limit for the 1970 model year, which permitted the divisions to install larger engines in their intermediate musclecars. For 1970, the regular 442 came standard with a 365-horsepower 455 Rocket V8, or an optional 370 horsepower (280 kW) W-30 version of same engine. For 1970, Olds planned to bring back the Hurst/Olds, but as a lower-priced companion to the 442 with a smaller 350 cubic-inch V8 and special graphics. That planned '70 H/O ended up being introduced as the mid-year Rallye 350, which featured a bright yellow paint scheme for the body along with front and rear bumpers coated with matching yellow urethane. The next Hurst/Olds would be introduced as a 1972 model. The Hurst branding was used for 1970 only on the Chrysler 300 Hurst Edition

== 1972 ==
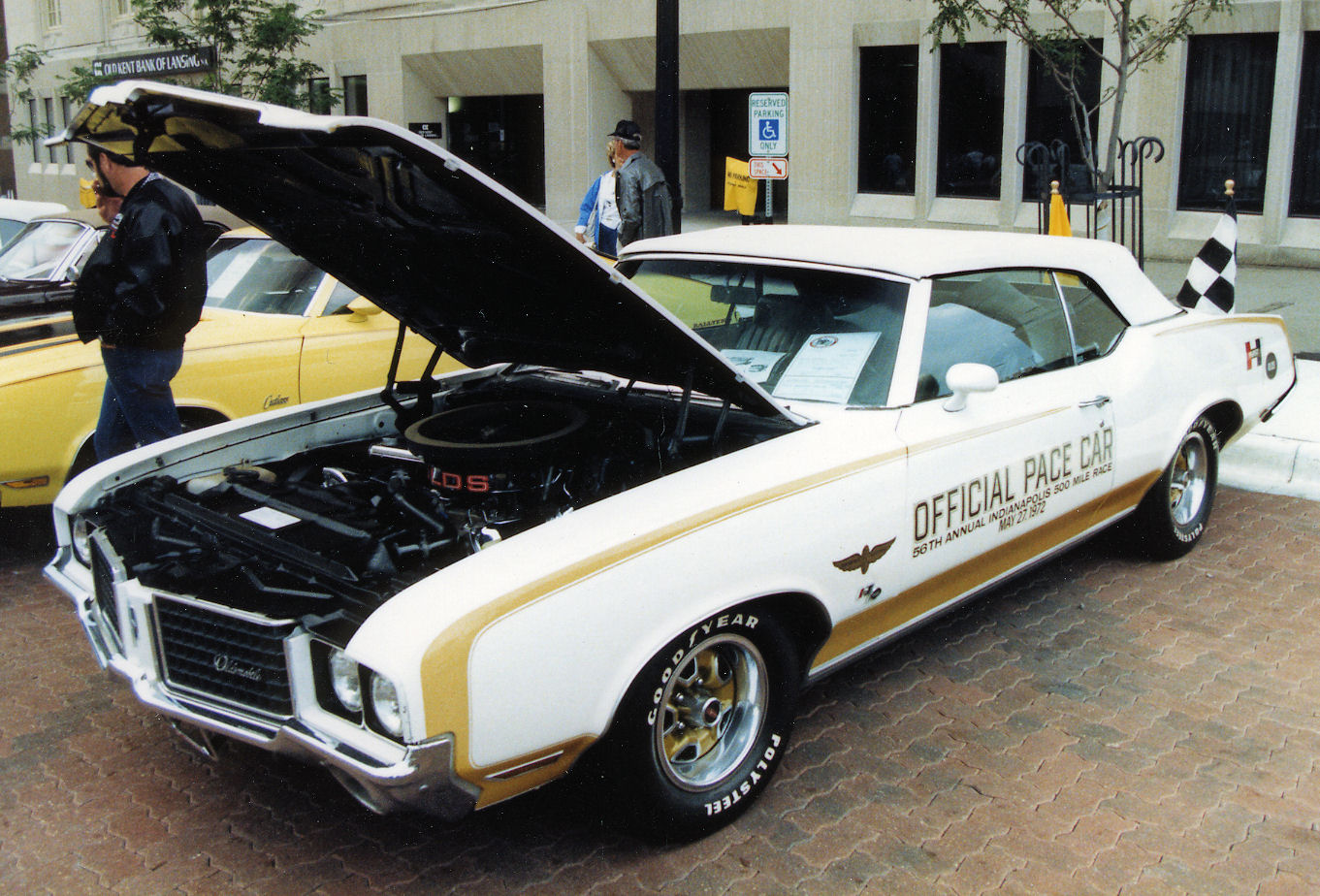
1972 Hurst/Olds Convertible Indy Pace Car

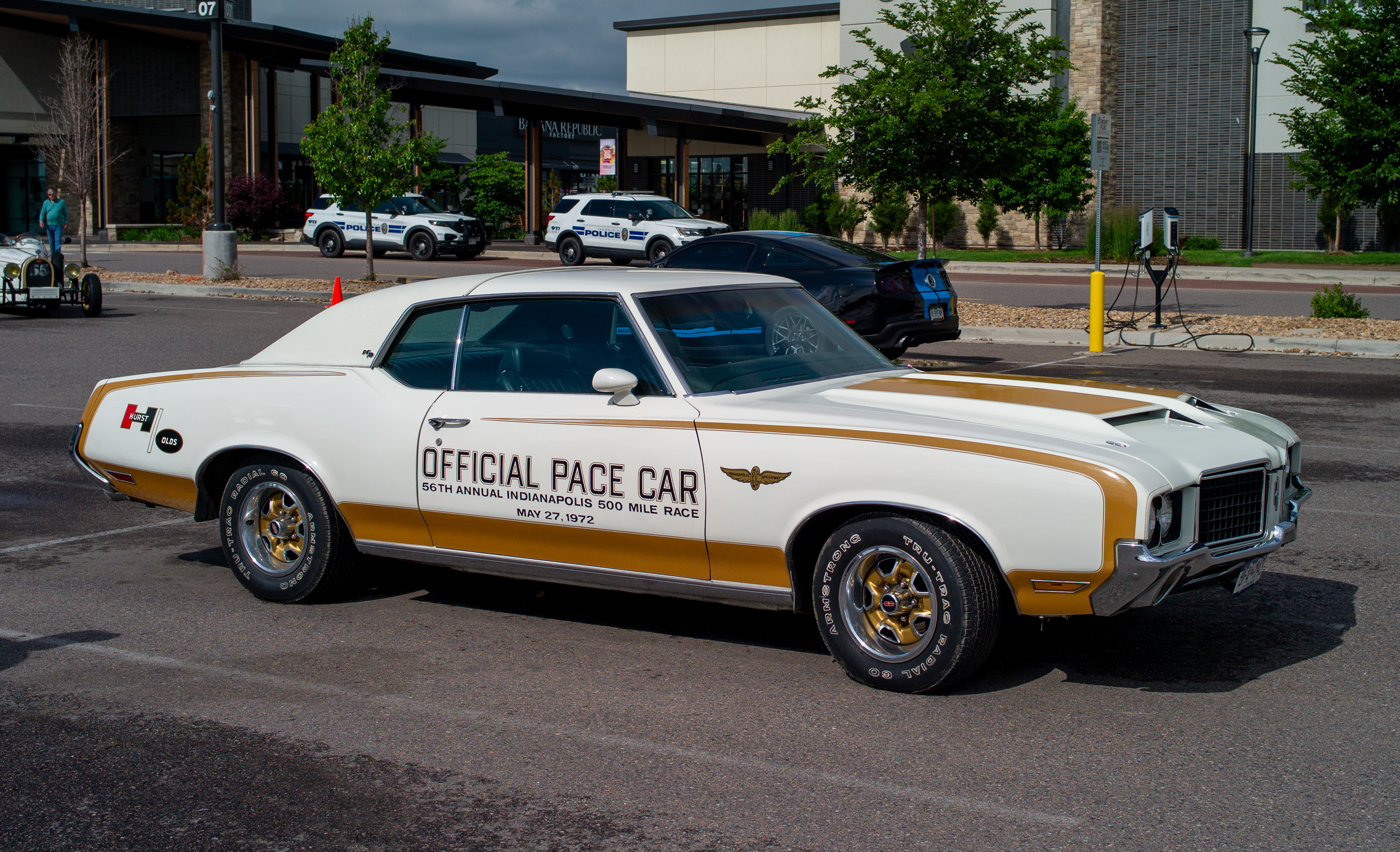

The 1972 Hurst/Olds was actually developed by Hurst Performance, and not Oldsmobile. Due to a tragic accident involving the 1971 Indy Pace car, a Dodge Challenger, the major auto manufacturers were reluctant to provide the pace car for the 1972 Indy race. Hurst Performance stepped up and volunteered to sponsor the 1972 Pace car. Oldsmobile provided the Cutlass Supreme coupe and convertible. It was the only time an Indy Pace car was sponsored by a manufacturer other than an automobile manufacturer, and first time to include a major supplier's name in the title. The 1972 edition of the Hurst/Olds had some of the lowest production numbers of any produced with a total of 629 made; 130 Convertibles, 220 hardtop with sunroof, 6 Station Wagons for Press and Ambulance use, and 279 hardtop cars. The only color available was Cameo White with reflective 3M gold stripes that were stickers, not paint. All of the cars had the W-25 Ram Air Hood and gold SS III Rally Wheels with a chrome bolt-on center cap and chrome beauty ring. The tires were Goodyear Polysteel Radials. The standard Hurst/Olds engine was the L75 455 cubic-inch Rocket V8 rated at 250 net horsepower (U in VIN). Optional at extra cost was the W-30 option with the L77 455, a blueprinted engine rated at 300 net horsepower (X in VIN). Both engines were mated to a Turbo Hydra-matic 400 transmission with console-mounted Hurst Dual-Gate shifter. All of the 1972 Hurst/Olds had the black Strato bucket interior with a center console. Special Hurst/Olds Pace Car badging adorned the glove box door and all 1972 Hurst/Olds' were identified with a W-45 Code on the cowl tag.

== 1973 ==
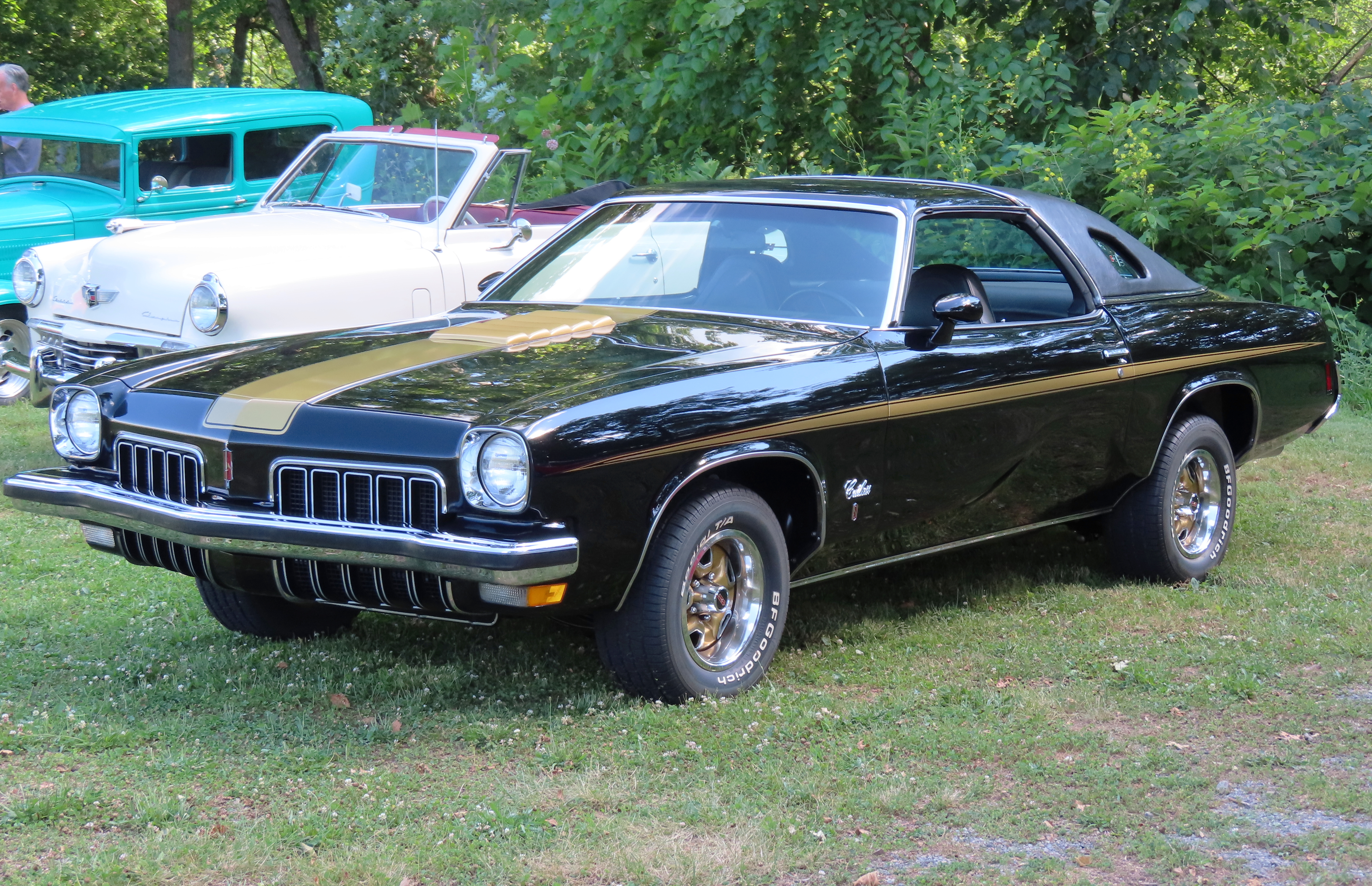
1973 Hurst/Olds in Ebony Black

The new Hurst Olds shared with all 1973 GM A body cars, the most extensive redesign in their 10-year history The chassis was as new as the bodies -Wheelbase dimensions were a sporty 112 inches for coupes and 116 inches for sedans and station wagons on an all-new sturdier perimeter frame with increased front and rear suspension travel, larger 8½ inch rear axle, wider 6-inch wheel rim width, refined rear control arm bushings and new shock absorber location, new body mounts and improved front suspension geometry - The left wheel was adjusted to have slightly more positive camber than the right which resulted in a more uniform and stable steering feel on high-crown road surfaces while maintaining excellent freeway cruise stability. Clearances for spring travel were improved for a smoother ride over all types of surfaces; the coil springs at each wheel were computer-selected to match the individual car's weight. Power brakes with front disc brake calipers were now standard on all '73 Cutlasses.

Additional new features were an acoustical double-panel roof, tighter-fitting glass, flush style outside door handles, molded full foam front and rear seat construction, flow-through power ventilation system, inside hood release, refined Delcotron generator and sealed side-terminal battery, a larger 22 gallon fuel tank, and "flush and dry" rocker panels introduced first on the redesigned 1971 full-size GM cars. Another structural improvement was a stronger design for the side door guard beams. Options included swiveling Strato-bucket seats (with console) for coupes, a power moonroof, and Turbine I urethane (backed by steel) wheels, as was the instrument gauge cluster.

The Oldsmobile Cutlass (including the Hurst/Olds and 442) changed body styles to the "Colonnade" body style, which was used until 1977. The Hurst Olds was based on the semi-fastback Cutlass S coupe and featured an interior with swiveling Strato bucket seats separated by a console with Hurst Dual-Gate shifter for the Turbo Hydra-matic 400 transmission. The sole engine offering was a 455 cubic-inch Rocket V8, with four-barrel carburetor and dual exhausts, with the 250 horsepower (190 kW) L75 U code engine. Also available was the L77 V code 455 with 270 horsepower (200 kW) available only without air conditioning. Although Pontiac's SD 455 cubic-inch engine lasted one more year with 290 horsepower (220 kW), Oldsmobile's high performance 455 engine would only last one more year culminating with the L76 optioned 455 W-30 Hurst/Olds in 1974. The '73 model was the first Hurst Olds to be offered in two color schemes-black/gold or white/gold. A grand total of 1,097 Hurst/Olds were produced for 1973 with about 60% being white/gold and about 40% being black/gold under option code W-45, unless ordered without air conditioning, which was option code W-46. Hurst-only options included a console mounted digital tachometer, air shocks, and alarm system.

== 1974 ==
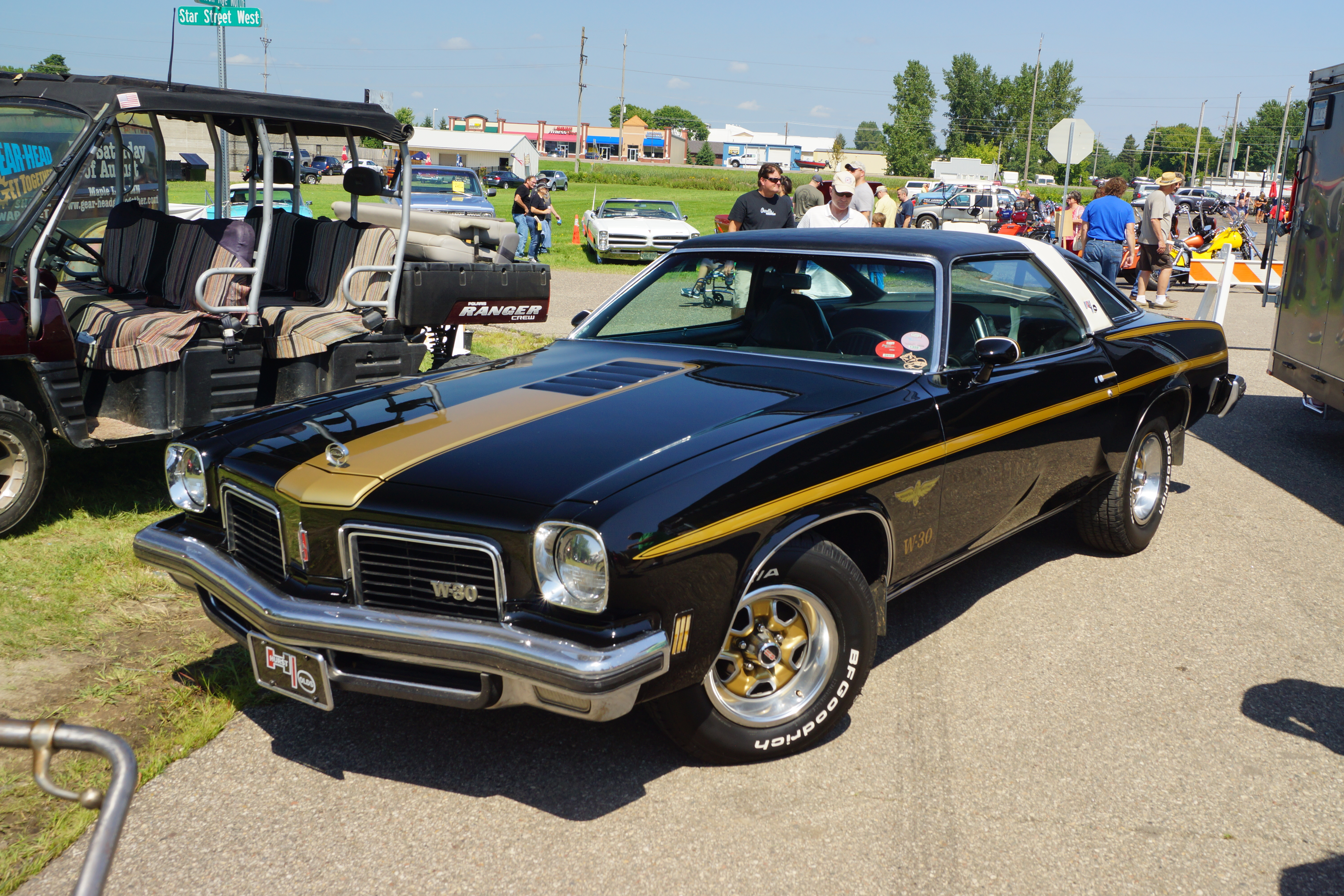
1974 Hurst/Olds W-30

The Hurst/Olds returned in 1974 with the "Colonnade" body style. This year the Hurst/Olds was also the Indianapolis 500 pace car, which was available as a graphics package option to the Hurst/Olds owner. 1800 1974 Hurst/Olds' were produced in 1974, 380 of them were the W-30 version which designated the 455 cubic-inch Rocket V8 and produced 230 net horsepower. The other 1420 had a 350 cubic-inch Rocket V8 with 180 horsepower (130 kW), which was also the only engine available for California cars. The 1974 Hurst/Olds was intended to be a pace car but because the Indy 500 track required convertibles for the parade lap cars, the Delta 88 was chosen. These cars were used as track cars to parade celebrities and guests on the track. There were a total of 92 Hurst/Olds Parade cars.

== 1975 ==
The Hurst/Olds in 1975 was the first General Motors car to have "Hurst/Hatch" removable T-Top style roof installed. The car is based on the formal-roofed Cutlass Supreme coupe rather than the semi-fastback Cutlass S used in 1973–74. The car was available in either black or white, with either a black or white half vinyl top offset by a wide aluminum band. Either a W-25, equipped with an Oldsmobile 350 engine, or a W-30, equipped with an Oldsmobile 455 engine could be had. Due to the environmental regulations at the time, this was the first year that the United States Environmental Protection Agency mandated the addition of catalytic converters mounted in the exhaust system. Due to the added expense, only single exhaust was available.

The hood from the 1974 Hurst/Olds, with the center mounted louvers, carried over. Gold stripes adorned the sides of the car, as well as the trunk, hood, and mirrors. The car also carried gold 15"x7" Super Stock III Oldsmobile rims. Interiors were similar to 1974 except for revised door panels and new reversible vinyl/velour seat cushions and backs for the all-vinyl Strato bucket seats. The most popular interior color combination on '75 Hurst/Olds was white seats and door panels, and black carpet, dashboard, steering wheel and console. Additional colors such as red and beige dashboard, carpet and seat cushions was also available. The Hurst Performance 'Dual Gate' Shifter carried on for 1975. An optional digital LED numerical readout tachometer was available and mounted on the center console by Hurst Performance.

== 1979 ==
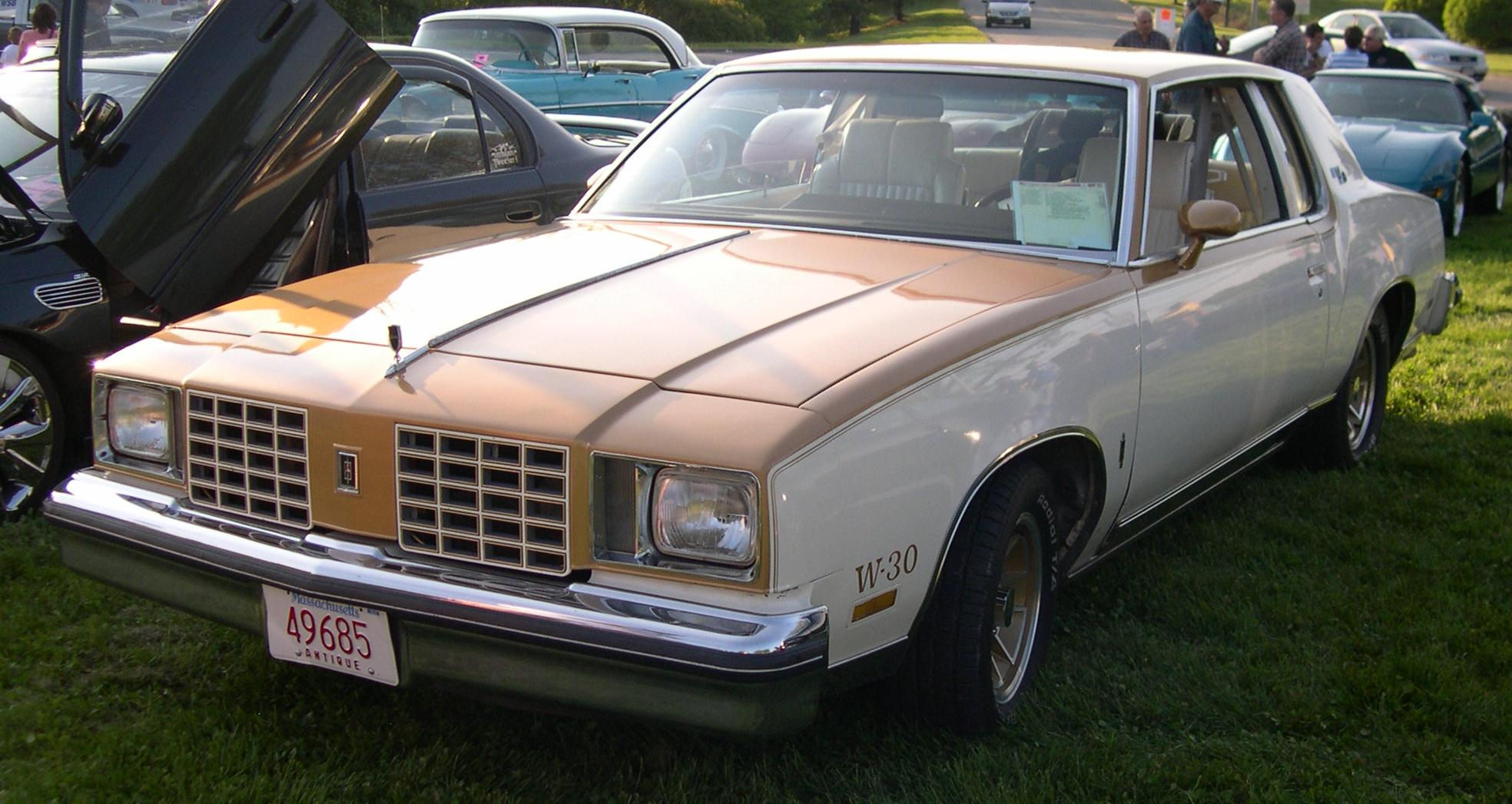
1979 Hurst/Olds W-30

Another car, now called simply the Hurst/Olds, appeared in 1979, based on the Cutlass Calais coupe. It used the L34, Oldsmobile's 5.7 L (350 in^{3}) V8 engine. A Hurst Dual Gate shifter was standard. After a three-year hiatus, the H/O returned for 1979 on GM's newly downsized Cutlass body. The first H/O to be built entirely by Oldsmobile Division, it was also the first H/O that did not offer a 455 engine. It was, however, the only GM G-body to offer a 350 V8 in 1979. It was also the first W-30 to come with the Olds 350 and not the Olds 455. White and black again were the color choices, but with a wider choice of interior trims than ever before. Gold paint covered the hood, most of the top, and the very rear of the trunk. The aluminum wheels were also painted gold, along with the grille. This H/O was built by Oldsmobile at the Lansing plant.

Known as the W-30, it was produced for the following year in the 1980 Olds 442. The only major differences between the 1979 and the 1980 were the headlights, and the 1979 also had the dual gate Hurst shifter.

== 1983–1984 ==
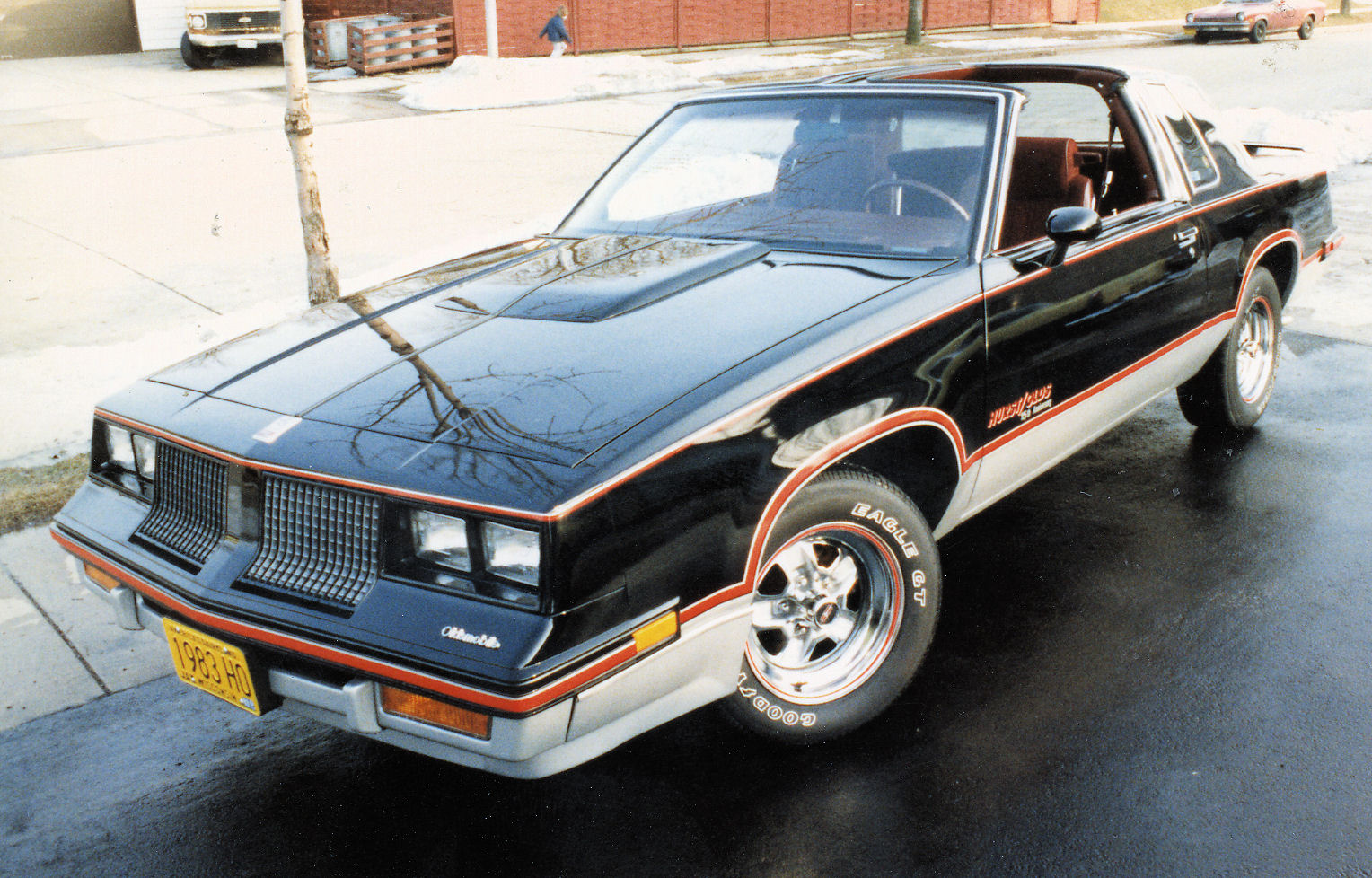
1983 Hurst/Olds T-Top

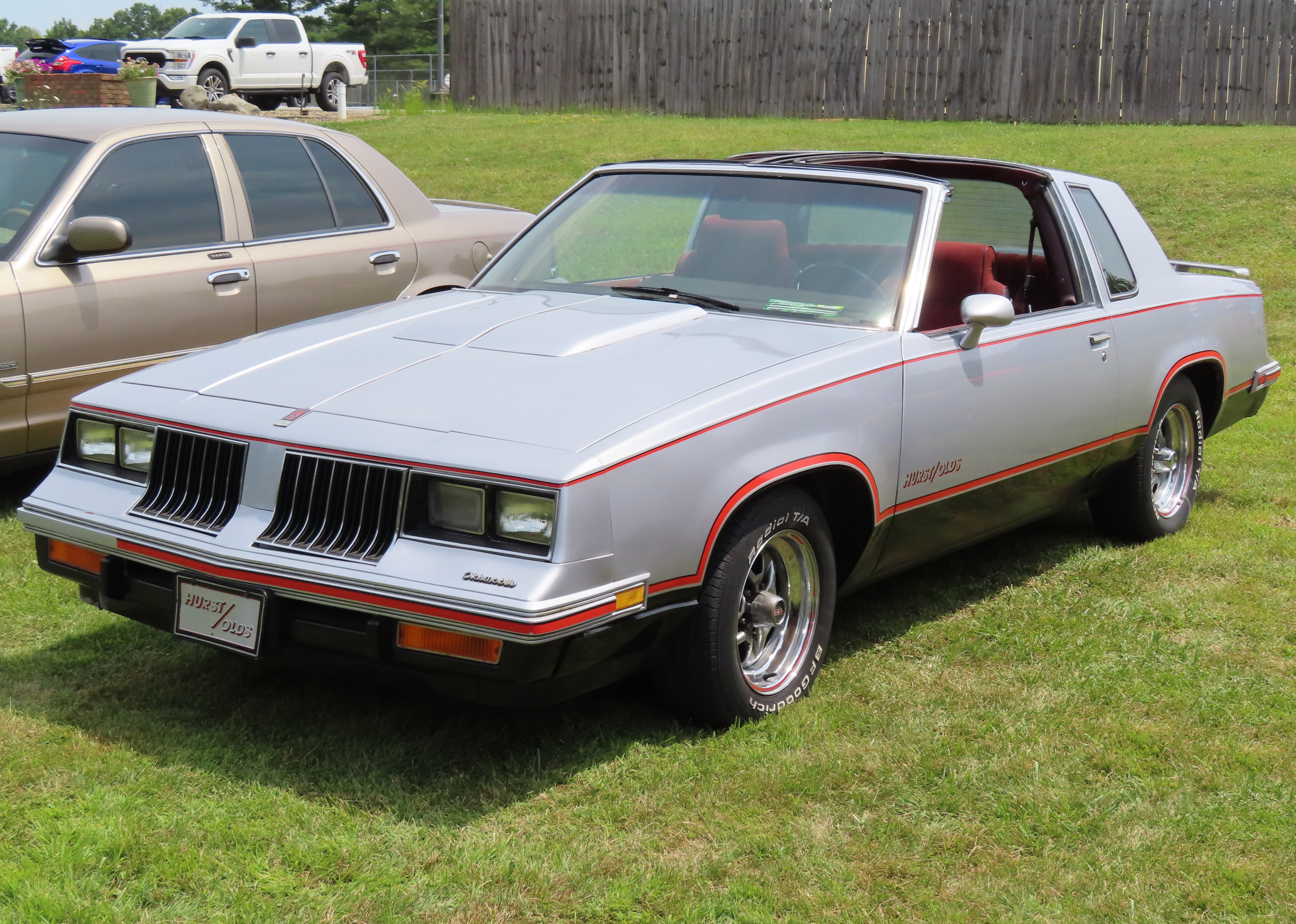
1984 Hurst/Olds Limited Edition

After the Cutlass line was split between the front-wheel drive A-body Cutlass Ciera and the rear-wheel drive G-body Cutlass Supreme in 1982, GM again offered a limited-edition Hurst/Olds - it was the 15th anniversary of the first Hurst/Olds introduced in 1968. The Hurst Lightning Rod floor shifter was introduced in the '83 H/O. For its 15th Anniversary Edition, the '83 H/O came only in black with silver rocker panels. Chrome 15" wheels fitted Goodyear Eagle GT tires, and a power bulge hood and rear spoiler gave the car a purposeful look. A modified version of Oldsmobile's 307 CID V8 was installed, along with 3.73 gears and Hurst's radical Lightning Rods shifter. Dual exhausts with rumbling mufflers meant there was no mistaking the H/O for a garden variety Cutlass. A new style "Hurst/Olds" emblem was introduced, and red and silver stripes separated the black and silver paint. Demand for the car was very strong. Originally, 2500 units were scheduled to be produced, but Olds had to up that number to 3001 because of high demand. That may have been a factor in bringing the H/O back for '84. The paint scheme was reversed, with silver being the main body color, and black on the rocker panels. In most respects, the '84 was mechanically identical to the '83. The '84 did get a stronger 8.5" rear end. 3500 units were produced in 1984.

A fully loaded 1984 H/O model cost $19,500 ($60,430 in 2025 dollars) while a base model was priced around $11,000 ($34,089 in 2025 dollars).

== Production numbers ==
1968	515
1969	906
1972	633
1973	1,097
1974	1,851
1975	2,535
1979	2,499
1983	3,001
1984	3,500
