= David J. Doyle =

American politician

David J. Doyle is an American politician from the State of Michigan.

Doyle, of Williamston, Michigan, is the president of D2 Strategy & Research, LLC. D2 is a communications and research firm. He previously was executive vice president of Marketing Resources Group, Inc. of Lansing Michigan.

Doyle served as chairman of the Michigan Republican Party from 1991 to 1995. As chairman, he served as the party's primary fund-raiser, strategist, and spokesman. In addition, he coordinated the successful campaigns of Michigan Governor John Engler, U.S. Senator of Michigan Spencer Abraham, Michigan Secretary of State Candice Miller, and numerous state House, state Senate, and congressional campaigns.

Nationally, in 1988, Doyle managed the successful Michigan campaign of U.S. Vice President George H. W. Bush; in 1996, Doyle served as the Midwest advisor to Bob Dole’s presidential campaign.

Internationally, Doyle represented the International Republican Institute on trips to Russia (1996), where he consulted with Russian political party leaders, and to Angola (1997), where he met with members of the Angolan Parliament. Doyle started his political career as the director of constituent relations for the Michigan House of Representatives. Later, he worked as the director of caucus services for the Michigan Senate. Doyle is a graduate of Oakland University and served on the Oakland University Board of Trustees. He is currently a member of the Michigan Chamber of Commerce Board of Directors.

In 2015, Doyle was one of 300 Republicans who signed an amicus brief asking the United States Supreme Court to legalize same-sex marriage nationwide.

Party political offices
| Preceded by E. Spencer Abraham | Chairman of the Michigan Republican Party; 1991– 1995 | Succeeded by Susy Heintz (Avery) |
