= James Whitney Dunn =

American politician

Jim Dunn
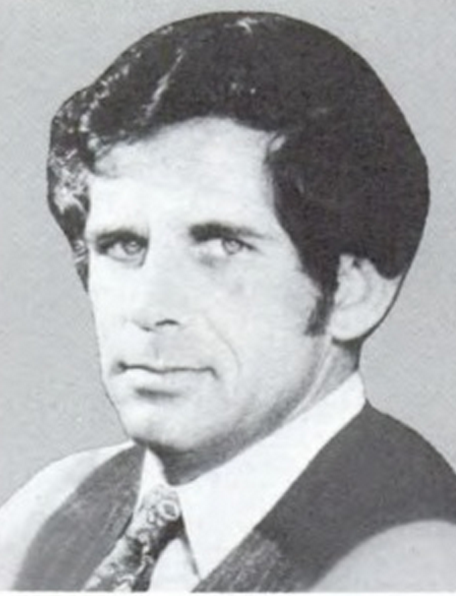

Member of the U.S. House of Representatives from Michigan's 6th district
- In office January 3, 1981 – January 3, 1983
- Preceded by: Bob Carr
- Succeeded by: Bob Carr

Personal details
- Born: James Whitney Dunn; July 21, 1943 (age 82) Detroit, Michigan, U.S.
- Party: Republican
- Education: Michigan State University (BA)

James Whitney Dunn (born July 21, 1943) is an American politician and businessman from the Michigan. He served in the U.S. House of Representatives from 1981 to 1983 before unsuccessfully seeking reelection. He ran for the Senate in 1984, losing the Republican primary to astronaut Jack R. Lousma, and in 1988, when he was defeated by Democratic incumbent Donald W. Riegle, Jr. He sought another term in the U.S. House in 1990, but lost in the Republican primary to Dave Camp, ending his electoral career.

== Biography ==
Dunn was born in Detroit, Michigan and attended the public schools. He received a B.A. from Michigan State University in 1967. He was president, Dunn & Fairmont, builder and developer. He was a delegate to the Michigan State Republican convention in 1982.

In 1980, Dunn defeated incumbent Democrat Bob Carr to be elected as a Republican from Michigan's 6th congressional district to the 97th Congress, serving from January 3, 1981 to January 3, 1983. In 1982, he was an unsuccessful candidate for reelection, losing in the general election to Carr. In 1984, Dunn made an unsuccessful run for the U.S. Senate seat held by Democrat Carl Levin, losing in the Republican primary to Jack R. Lousma. In 1986, he ran for the 6th district seat, and again lost in the general election to Bob Carr. In 1988, he won the Republican nomination to the U.S. Senate, having defeated former U.S. Representative Robert J. Huber, who had left office in 1975. Dunn then lost the general election to the Democrat Donald W. Riegle, Jr. In 1990, he ran for the U.S. House again, this time from the 10th district, but he lost the Republican primary to Dave Camp.

He is a resident of East Lansing, Michigan.

U.S. House of Representatives
Preceded by Bob Carr	Member of the U.S. House of Representatives from Michigan's 6th congressional district 1981–1983	Succeeded by Bob Carr
Party political offices
Preceded by Philip Ruppe	Republican nominee for U.S. Senator from Michigan (Class 1); 1988	Succeeded by Spencer Abraham
U.S. order of precedence (ceremonial)
Preceded by Joan Kelly Horn as Former U.S. Representative	Order of precedence of the United States as Former U.S. Representative	Succeeded by Dick Chrysler as Former U.S. Representative
