= 1994 United States Senate election in Michigan =

- November 8, 1994
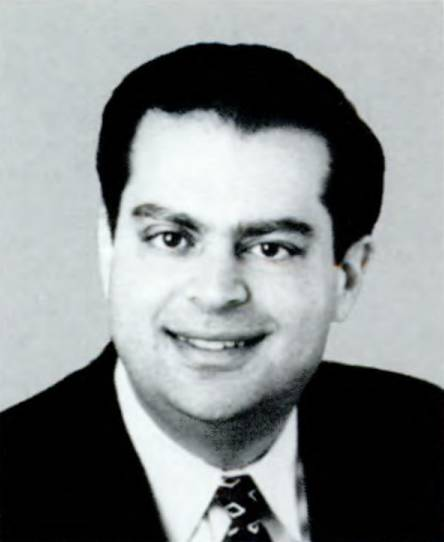

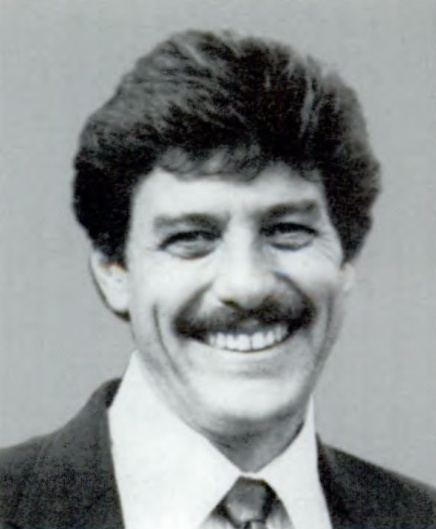
Nominee	Spencer Abraham	Bob Carr
Party	Republican	Democratic
Popular vote	1,578,770	1,300,960
Percentage	51.88%	42.75%
- County results Abraham: 40–50% 50–60% 60–70% 70–80% Carr: 40–50% 50–60%
U.S. senator before election
Don Riegle
Democratic
Elected U.S. Senator
Spencer Abraham
Republican

The 1994 United States Senate election in Michigan was held November 8, 1994. Incumbent Democratic Senator Don Riegle decided not run for re-election. Spencer Abraham won the open seat, becoming the first Republican to win a U.S. Senate race in Michigan since Robert P. Griffin in 1972 and the first to win the state's Class I seat since Charles E. Potter in 1952. As of 2026, this was the last time that a Republican was elected to a U.S. Senate seat in Michigan.

== Background ==
Riegle, a three term incumbent, was considered one of the most vulnerable Senate Democrats in the 1994 mid-term elections, due to the unpopularity of President Bill Clinton and his being involved as a member of the Keating Five, a group of five United States Senators who were accused of corruption. After months of speculation, Riegle announced he would not seek a 4th term in a speech on the Senate floor.

== Democratic primary ==
=== Candidates ===
- William Brodhead, former U.S. Representative from Detroit
- Bob Carr, U.S. Representative from East Lansing
- Joel Ferguson, businessman and member of the Democratic National Committee
- John F. Kelly, State Senator from Grosse Pointe Woods
- Carl Marlinga, Macomb County Prosecuting Attorney
- Lana Pollack, State Senator from Ann Arbor

==== Declined ====
- Donald W. Riegle, incumbent Senator since 1977

=== Results ===
1994 Democratic U.S. Senate primary
Party	Candidate	Votes	%
Democratic	Bob Carr	157,585	24.02%
Democratic	Lana Pollack	151,323	23.06%
Democratic	Joel Ferguson	130,125	19.83%
Democratic	William Brodhead	94,601	14.42%
Democratic	John F. Kelly	71,964	10.97%
Democratic	Carl Marlinga	50,329	7.67%
Write-in		271	0.04%
Total votes		656,198	100.00%

== Republican primary ==
=== Candidates ===
- Spencer Abraham, former chairman of the Michigan Republican Party
- Ronna Romney, conservative radio talk show host

=== Campaign ===
The Republican primary campaign amicably divided the Romney family. Though Ronna Romney had divorced Scott Romney two years prior, Scott's brother Mitt Romney (also a candidate for the United States Senate in Massachusetts) returned to Michigan to campaign for her. Scott and Mitt's father George W. Romney, the former Governor of Michigan, endorsed Abraham, having promised Abraham the endorsement prior to her candidacy. Her daughter, the future Chairman of the Republican National Committee Ronna Romney McDaniel, volunteered as a driver during her campaign.

=== Results ===
1994 Republican U.S. Senate primary
Party	Candidate	Votes	%
Republican	Spencer Abraham	292,399	51.95%
Republican	Ronna Romney	270,304	48.02%
Write-in		202	0.04%
Total votes		562,905	100.00%

== General election ==
=== Candidates ===
- Spencer Abraham, former chairman of the Michigan Republican Party (Republican)
- Bob Carr, U.S. Representative from East Lansing (Democratic)
- Jon Coon (Libertarian)
- William Roundtree (Workers' World)
- Chris Wege (Natural Law)

=== Results ===
1994 United States Senate election in Michigan
Party	Candidate	Votes	%
Republican	Spencer Abraham	1,578,770	51.88%
Democratic	Bob Carr	1,300,960	42.75%
Libertarian	Jon Coon	128,393	4.22%
Workers World	William Roundtree	20,010	0.66%
Natural Law	Chris Wege	14,746	0.48%
Write-in		506	0.02%
Total votes		3,043,385	100.00%
Republican gain from Democratic			

== See also ==
- Politics of the United States
- 1994 United States Senate elections
