= Dick Chrysler =

American politician (born 1942)

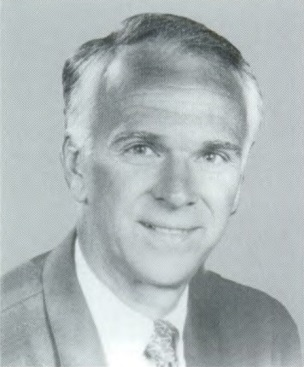

Member of the U.S. House of Representatives from Michigan's 8th district
- In office January 3, 1995 – January 3, 1997
- Preceded by: Bob Carr
- Succeeded by: Debbie Stabenow

Personal details
- Born: April 29, 1942 (age 84) Saint Paul, Minnesota, U.S.
- Party: Republican
- Spouse: Katie Tate

Chrysler greeting US President George H. W. Bush in 1992

Richard R. Chrysler (born April 29, 1942) is an American businessman and former politician who was a U.S. representative from Michigan from 1995 until 1997.

== Biography ==
Chrysler was born in Saint Paul, Minnesota, and graduated from Brighton High School in Brighton, Michigan. He became vice-president of Hurst Performance and the founder and president of Cars and Concepts (which bought out Hurst), and Richard Chrysler Industries (RCI).

In 1986, he campaigned for governor of Michigan as a Republican, but lost a hard-fought primary to Wayne County Executive William Lucas.

Chrysler lost his first campaign for the United States House of Representatives to Bob Carr in 1992, in a race described as "the most expensive Congressional race in Michigan that cycle." After Carr gave up his seat to run for Senate, however, Chrysler was elected in 1994 as a Republican member of the Amway caucus from Michigan's 8th congressional district to the 104th Congress. He served from January 3, 1995, to January 3, 1997. While in Congress, he sponsored eight bills and co-sponsored 183 more, including the Defense of Marriage Act. He supported the Contract with America, and proposed replacing the federal income tax and capital gains tax with a 15% sales tax. He was defeated by Democrat Debbie Stabenow in the 1996 election for the 105th Congress.

Following his political career, Chrysler returned to the automotive industry, exploring battery technologies for electric vehicles. "We've been getting ready for four years now," he told Crain's Detroit Business in 1996. "It's time to get going. This market is on the verge of exploding."

== Electoral history ==
- 1996 Race for U.S. House of Representatives - 8th District
  - Debbie Stabenow (D), 53.76%
  - Dick Chrysler (R) (inc.), 44.14%
  - Doug MacDonald (L), 1.45%
  - Patricia R. Allen (NL), 0.64%
- 1994 Race for U.S. House of Representatives - 8th District
  - Dick Chrysler (R), 51.61%
  - Bob Mitchell (D), 44.89%
  - Gerald R. Turcotte, Jr. (L), 2.05%
  - Susan Ilene McPeak (NL), 1.45%
- 1992 Race for U.S. House of Representatives - 8th District
  - Bob Carr (D) (inc.), 47.60%
  - Dick Chrysler (R), 46.33%
  - Frank McAlpine (I), 4.27%
  - Michael E. Marotta, (L), 1.80%
- 1986 Race for Governor (Republican Primary)
  - Bill Lucas, 44.50%
  - Dick Chrysler, 34.03%
  - Colleen Engler, 10.98%
  - Dan Murphy, 10.49%

U.S. House of Representatives
Preceded by Bob Carr	Member of the U.S. House of Representatives from Michigan's 8th congressional district 1995–1997	Succeeded by Debbie Stabenow
U.S. order of precedence (ceremonial)
Preceded by James Whitney Dunn as Former U.S. Representative	Order of precedence of the United States as Former U.S. Representative	Succeeded by Mark Schauer as Former U.S. Representative
