= Bob Carr (Michigan politician) =

American politician (1943–2024)

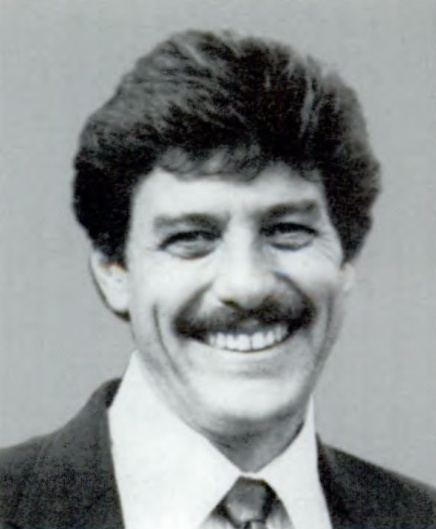

Member of the U.S. House of Representatives from Michigan
- In office January 3, 1983 – January 3, 1995
- Preceded by: James Whitney Dunn
- Succeeded by: Dick Chrysler
- Constituency: 6th district (1983–1993); 8th district (1993–1995)
- In office January 3, 1975 – January 3, 1981
- Preceded by: Charles E. Chamberlain
- Succeeded by: James Whitney Dunn
- Constituency: 6th district (1975–1981)

Personal details
- Born: Milton Robert Carr; March 27, 1943 Janesville, Wisconsin, U.S.
- Died: August 27, 2024 (aged 81) Washington, D.C., U.S.
- Party: Democratic
- Children: 1
- Education: University of Wisconsin–Madison (BS, JD)
- Profession: Lawyer

Milton Robert Carr (March 27, 1943 – August 27, 2024) was an American lawyer, academic, and politician from Michigan.

Carr served in the U.S. House of Representatives from Michigan's 6th and 8th congressional districts for eight terms and one term, respectively. Carr's career in the U.S. House had a two-year hiatus in which he had lost his seat to Jim Dunn in 1980 before being reelected to Congress in 1982.

Following his career in Congress, Carr became of counsel at a Washington, D.C.–based communications law firm in 2005. He was involved with the United States Association of Former Members of Congress, where he served on the board of directors.

== Background ==
Carr was born in Janesville, Wisconsin, on March 27, 1943. He received a B.S. from the University of Wisconsin–Madison, Madison in 1965 and a J.D. from the University of Wisconsin Law School in 1968. He did graduate work at Michigan State University in East Lansing, Michigan, and was admitted to the Wisconsin bar in 1968 and to the Michigan bar in 1969. He commenced practice in Lansing, Michigan, and served as Michigan assistant attorney general, from 1970 to 1972.

== U.S. House of Representatives ==
Carr first ran as a Democrat for Michigan's 6th congressional district in 1972, facing eight-term Republican incumbent Charles E. Chamberlain. Chamberlain narrowly defeated Carr by 97,666 votes (50.68%) to 95,029 (49.32%) in what was otherwise a strong Republican year, which persuaded Chamberlain to retire in 1974, when he was succeeded by Carr.

Carr represented the district in the U.S. House for the 94th and to the two succeeding Congresses, serving from January 3, 1975, to January 3, 1981. He was an unsuccessful candidate for re-election in 1980 to the 97th Congress, being defeated by James Whitney Dunn. Two years later, he defeated Dunn and was elected to the 98th Congress and subsequently re-elected five times. The last two years he represented Michigan's 8th congressional district after the redistricting in 1993. In 1994, he was the Democrats' nominee for United States Senate in Michigan, losing to Spencer Abraham.

Early in his Congressional career, Carr was described by a columnist for The Detroit News as "the classic angry young man." He called for the resignation of Democratic U.S. House Speaker Carl Albert on national television, but Carr later expressed regret for his early attacks on the Congressional leadership and called them "sheer, naive stupidity." After taking office in 1975 Carr was named to the House Armed Services Committee, where he focused his attention on ending U.S. involvement in the war in Southeast Asia. On March 12, 1975, with the influential help of House Democratic Caucus Chairman Phillip Burton, Carr authored a resolution that passed the Caucus by 189–49 effectively cutting off further military assistance to South Vietnam or to Cambodia in fiscal year 1975.

After losing and regaining his seat in the 1980 and 1982 elections, respectively, he was named to the House Committee on Appropriations, lowered his profile, and focused his attention on budget and spending issues. He became chairman of the Subcommittee on Transportation, where he pioneered the use of economic-based criteria and ranks to earmarks requested by members of Congress for their districts.

Carr gave up his seat in the House to run for Senate in 1994, winning the Democratic primary but losing to Republican Spencer Abraham in the general election.

== Later career ==
Carr became an adjunct professor at George Washington University's Graduate School of Political Management and a senior adviser at the Brookings Institution's Brookings Executive Education. He also assisted in the Brookings Institution Fellows program and worked as a consultant in Washington. Prior to his tenures at George Washington University and the Brookings Institution, he worked at the Dow Lohnes law firm in Washington, D.C.

Carr was a member of the board of directors of the United States Association of Former Members of Congress. Carr was also a member of the ReFormers Caucus of Issue One.

== Personal life and death ==
Carr had a daughter.

In 2006 or 2007, Carr was diagnosed with multiple myeloma. He was successfully treated with chemotherapy, bortezomib, steroids, and a stem cell transplant. He was subsequently involved in advocating for funding for cancer research and was featured in the Cancer Progress Report 2012. He was later diagnosed with esophageal cancer.

Carr died in Washington on August 27, 2024, at the age of 81.

Party political offices
Preceded by Donald Riegle	Democratic nominee for U.S. Senator from Michigan (Class 1); 1994	Succeeded by Debbie Stabenow
U.S. House of Representatives
Preceded by Charles E. Chamberlain	Member of the U.S. House of Representatives from Michigan's 6th congressional district 1975–1981	Succeeded by Jim Dunn
Preceded by Jim Dunn	Member of the U.S. House of Representatives from Michigan's 6th congressional district 1983–1993	Succeeded by Fred Upton
Preceded by Bob Traxler	Member of the U.S. House of Representatives from Michigan's 8th congressional district 1993–1995	Succeeded by Dick Chrysler
