= L.A. Dart (car) =

L.A. Dart is a series of wheelstander funny cars of the 1960s.

Driven by "Wild Bill" Shrewsberry, the Dodge Darts each had a rear-mounted, supercharged Chrysler Hemi engine. The result of the rearward weight transfer caused by the engine's mounting position was a "wheelie" for the entire quarter-mile at speeds exceeding 100 miles per hour (160 km/h). Steering was accomplished by a combination of the service brake pedal activating the brake on the left wheel while a brake lever from a racing go-kart activated the right brake. So proficient was Shrewsberry at this sort of driving that he would often spin his car to face the opposite direction at the end of the track and race back to the starting line, all the while maintaining the wheelstand.

They were sponsored by the Dodge and Plymouth dealers of Los Angeles and Orange Counties.

The 1970 iteration of L.A. Dart was the subject of a 1/25-scale plastic model kit, first produced by Model Products Corporation and since reissued by Model King using the original tooling.

In the late 1990s, a 1/64-scale diecast model L.A. Dart was issued by Johnny Lightning.

That 1970 car, updated for the 1971 season (with a 1971 front grille), is still owned by Shrewsberry and is undergoing restoration at his son's home in Ridgecrest.
