= Susy Avery =

American politician (born 1947)

Chair of the Michigan Republican Party
- In office 1995–1996
- Preceded by: David Doyle
- Succeeded by: Betsy DeVos

Personal details
- Born: Susy Heintz; October 30, 1947 (age 78)
- Party: Republican
- Spouse: Lance Avery
- Education: University of Michigan–Dearborn (B.A.)

Susy (Heintz) Avery (born October 30, 1947) is an American politician from the state of Michigan. She was Chairman of the Michigan Republican Party from 1995 to 1996 and the Party's 1996 nominee to represent Michigan's 10th congressional district in the United States House of Representatives.

== Biography ==
A native of Kalamazoo, Susy Heintz graduated from the University of Michigan–Dearborn, where she earned a Bachelor of Arts degree in political science and served on the Alumni Board of Governors. In 1995, she was recognized as the Distinguished Alumna of the Year by the university's Dearborn Alumni Society.

In 1995, Avery became the chairman of Michigan Republican Party until 1996.

In the course of her political career, Heintz has served as vice chair of the Wayne County Commission; was elected supervisor, clerk and trustee of the charter township of Northville; and held the office of the executive director of the Conference of Western Wayne. She has been a member of the Michigan Commission on Intergovernmental Relations, the Detroit Water Board and the board of directors of Blue Cross/Blue Shield of Michigan and was appointed to the Southeastern Michigan Transportation Authority, where she served on the board of directors and executive committee of the Southeast Michigan Council of Governments.

In November 1996, after serving as the Republican Party's State Chairman, Susy Heintz mounted a strong challenge to the 10th district's veteran Democratic Representative, David Bonior, the House Minority Whip, who had represented the district since his election in 1976. On Election Day, Heintz received 106,444 votes to Bonior's 132,829. Following her defeat, she was appointed by Republican Governor John Engler in August 1997 as the director of his Southeastern Michigan office. She held the job until January 1999, when she was appointed to become the new director of the state's tourism agency Travel Michigan.

Governor Engler appointed Susy Avery to be Director of Public Affairs for the Office of the Governor. Another of her appointments was to the Michigan Capitol Committee, a position in which she advised and made recommendations on the implementation of all permanent physical changes to be made in or on the Capitol building, or its grounds. The term expired January 24, 2003.

Gov. Rick Snyder appointed her executive director of the Michigan Women's Commission, a post from which she retired in 2016.

In 2017, Susy Avery became the new co-director of the Michigan Political Leadership Program, Michigan State University's training program for up-and-coming leaders.

== Personal life ==
On January 9, 1999, Avery married Lance Avery.

Party political offices
Preceded by David J. Doyle	Chairman of the Michigan Republican Party; 1995 – 1996	Succeeded by Betsy DeVos
