= Spencer Abraham =

American politician (born 1952)

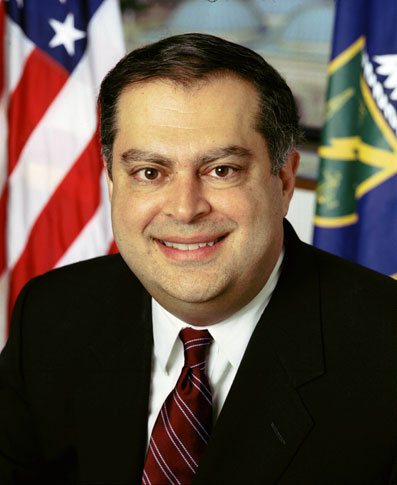
- Official portrait, 2001

10th United States Secretary of Energy
- In office January 20, 2001 – January 31, 2005
- President: George W. Bush
- Preceded by: Bill Richardson
- Succeeded by: Samuel Bodman

United States Senator from Michigan
- In office January 3, 1995 – January 3, 2001
- Preceded by: Donald Riegle
- Succeeded by: Debbie Stabenow

Chair of the Michigan Republican Party
- In office 1983–1991
- Preceded by: Melvin L. Larsen
- Succeeded by: David J. Doyle

Personal details
- Born: Edward Spencer Abraham; June 12, 1952 (age 74) East Lansing, Michigan, U.S.
- Party: Republican
- Spouse: Jane Abraham
- Education: Michigan State University (BA); Harvard University (JD)
- Awards: Lebanese National Order of the Cedar (Commander Class)

Edward Spencer Abraham (born June 12, 1952) is an American attorney, author, and politician who served as the 10th United States secretary of energy from 2001 to 2005, under President George W. Bush. A member of the Republican Party, he previously served as a United States senator from Michigan from 1995 to 2001. Abraham is one of the founders of the Federalist Society, and a co-founder of the Harvard Journal of Law & Public Policy. As of 2026, he is the last Republican to have served as a U.S. senator from Michigan.

== Education and family ==
Abraham was born in East Lansing, Michigan, the son of Juliette Elizabeth (Sear), a member of the Michigan Republican State Central Committee, and Eddie Joseph Abraham. He is a graduate of East Lansing High School. Of Lebanese descent, Abraham is married to Jane Abraham, chair of the Susan B. Anthony List. They have three children. He holds a Juris Doctor (J.D.) degree from Harvard University, and is a 1974 Honors College graduate of Michigan State University. In 1978, while at Harvard Law School, Abraham helped found the Harvard Journal of Law & Public Policy, which became one of the official journals of the Federalist Society, which was founded in 1982.

== Political career ==
Before his election to the Senate, Abraham was a law professor at Thomas M. Cooley Law School.

=== Republican Party service ===
He was elected chairman of the Michigan Republican Party from 1983 to 1990. He was deputy chief of staff for Vice President Dan Quayle from 1990 to 1991. He later served as co-chairman of the National Republican Congressional Committee (NRCC) from 1991 to 1993 and ran for chairman of the Republican National Committee in 1993, coming second to Haley Barbour.

=== United States Senate ===
Abraham was elected to represent Michigan in the United States Senate in 1994, and he served until 2001 after being defeated for reelection in 2000 by Debbie Stabenow. He was the only Lebanese American in the chamber. According to The New York Times, state Republicans attributed his loss to "scathing advertisements by a wide range of special interest groups, including advertisements that criticized Mr. Abraham's support for a relaxation of some immigration restrictions". During the campaign, the Federation for American Immigration Reform, an anti-immigration advocacy group with ties to white nationalism, ran ads asking: "Why is Senator Spencer Abraham trying to make it easier for terrorists like Osama bin Laden to export their war of terror to any city street in America?" The media denounced these commercials as "vengeful". In 1996, when President Bill Clinton endorsed Representative Barbara Jordan's proposed cuts to legal immigration, Abraham played a leading role in blocking the cuts. Another factor in his defeat was his vote to convict Clinton in his 1999 impeachment trial. The next year he received the "Defender of the Melting Pot" award from the National Council of La Raza for his efforts on immigration.

=== Committee service and legislation ===
Abraham served on the Budget, Commerce, Science and Transportation, Judiciary, and Small Business Committees. He also chaired two subcommittees: Manufacturing and Competitiveness, and Immigration. Abraham authored the H1B Visa in Global and National Commerce Act, establishing a federal framework for online contracts and signatures; the Government Paperwork Elimination Act, and the Anti-Cybersquatting Consumer Protection Act, which protects Internet domain names for businesses and persons against copyright and trademark infringements. In 1999, Abraham co-sponsored S.896, a bill to abolish the U.S. Department of Energy, which would have transferred control of the Strategic Petroleum Reserve in large part to the Defense Department.

=== U.S. Secretary of Energy ===
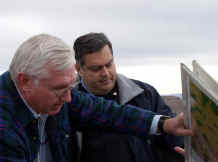
Abraham working as the Secretary of Energy near Yucca Mountain

In 2001, George W. Bush appointed Abraham Secretary of Energy. On November 15, 2004, Abraham announced that he would resign from this position, effective with the swearing-in of his successor, Samuel W. Bodman, on February 1, 2005.

In 2004, Lebanese Ambassador Farid Abboud awarded Abraham the National Order of the Cedar.

=== Hoover Institution ===
From 2005 to 2007, Abraham was a Distinguished Visiting Fellow at the Hoover Institution, a think tank based at Stanford University. After leaving office, he opened The Abraham Group, a Washington DC–based international strategic consulting firm, of which he is chairman and CEO.

=== Fred Thompson presidential campaign ===
On July 24, 2007, Abraham was announced as an "ambassador to official Washington" for Fred Thompson's 2008 presidential campaign.

== Later career ==
In 2006, Abraham was appointed Non-Executive Chairman of the Board of AREVA Inc., the American arm of the French nuclear company Areva, which is planning to build EPR nuclear power plants in the United States and is building the mixed oxide fuel (MOX) manufacturing plant at the Savannah River Site to convert legacy weapons-grade plutonium into power station fuel.

With William Tucker, Abraham wrote Lights Out!: Ten Myths About (and Real Solutions to) America's Energy Crisis (2010).

In 2016, Abraham was elected to the board of trustees of the California Institute of Technology.

Former Energy Secretary Abraham has maintained a significant foothold in the nuclear energy and uranium sectors. He serves as chairman of the board for Uranium Energy Corp. and he stands for office again in July 2026. His messaging centers on U.S. energy independence and infrastructure security.

== Electoral history ==
Michigan U.S. Senate Election 2000
| Party | Candidate | Votes | % | ±% |
|---|---|---|---|---|
| Democratic | Debbie Stabenow | 2,061,952 | 49.5 | |
| Republican | Spencer Abraham (Incumbent) | 1,994,693 | 47.9 | |

Michigan U.S. Senate Election 1994
| Party | Candidate | Votes | % | ±% |
|---|---|---|---|---|
| Republican | Spencer Abraham | 1,577,865 | 52 | |
| Democratic | Bob Carr | 1,298,726 | 43 | |
| Libertarian | Jon Coon | 127,783 | 4 | |

== Book ==
- Abraham, Spencer (with William Tucker). (2010) Lights Out!: Ten Myths About (and Real Solutions to) America's Energy Crisis. New York: St. Martin's Press. ISBN 978-0-312-57021-7

== See also ==
- List of Arab and Middle-Eastern Americans in the United States Congress
- List of Harvard University politicians

Party political offices
| Preceded by Melvin L. Larsen | Chair of the Michigan Republican Party; 1983–1991 | Succeeded by David J. Doyle |
| Preceded by James Whitney Dunn | Republican nominee for U.S. Senator from Michigan (Class 1); 1994, 2000 | Succeeded by Mike Bouchard |
U.S. Senate
| Preceded by Donald W. Riegle Jr. | U.S. Senator (Class 1) from Michigan; 1995–2001; Served alongside: Carl Levin | Succeeded by Debbie Stabenow |
Political offices
| Preceded by Bill Richardson | United States Secretary of Energy; 2001–2005 | Succeeded by Samuel Bodman |
U.S. order of precedence (ceremonial)
| Preceded by Donald Evans as Former U.S. Cabinet Member | Order of precedence of the United States as Former U.S. Cabinet Member | Succeeded by Anthony Principi as Former U.S. Cabinet Member |
