= Rally-Pac =

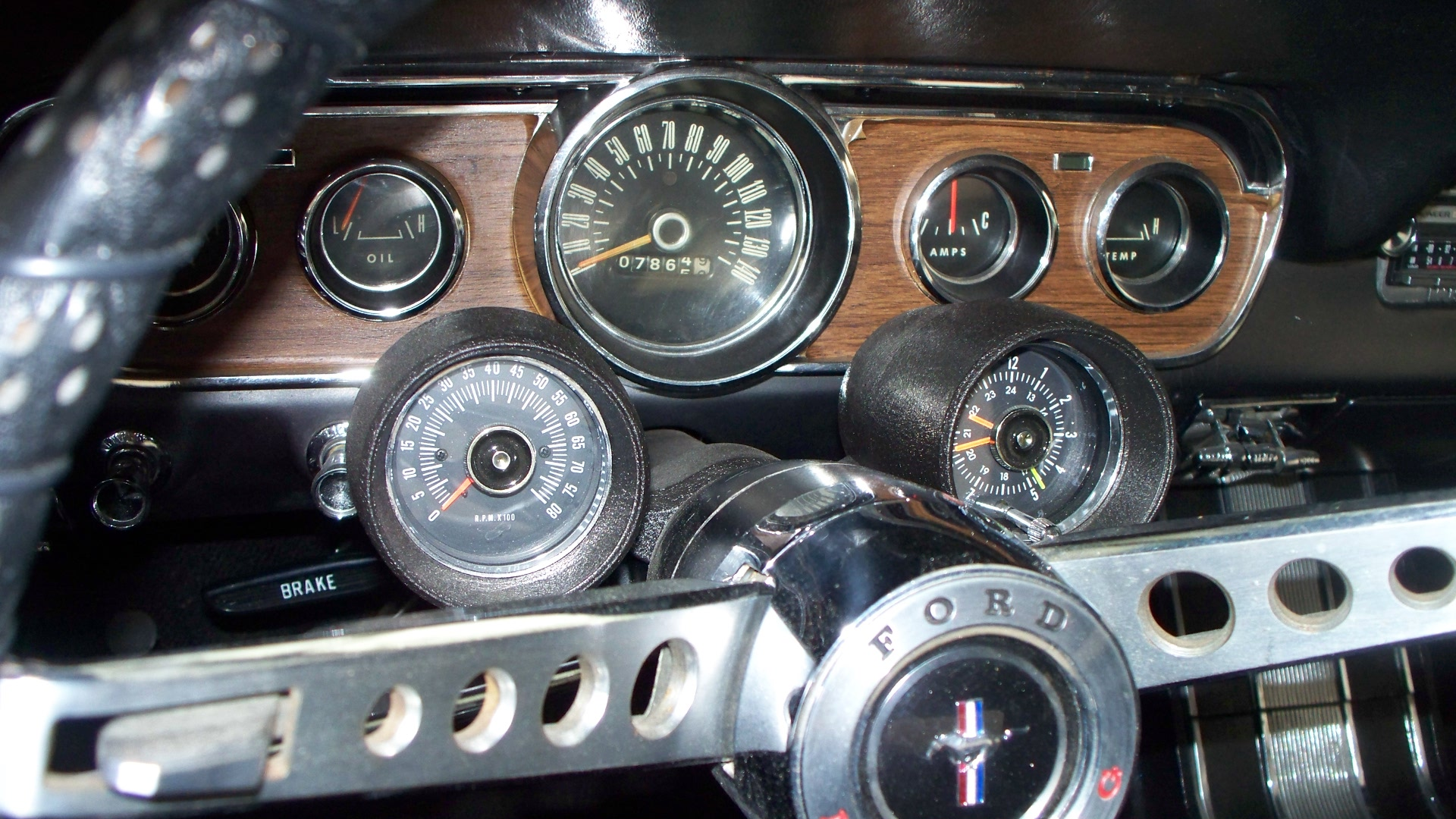
Rare, high-performance 8000 RPM Rally-Pac as factory installed on a low-mileage 1966 Mustang GT convertible

Rally-Pac is the name given to an optional tachometer and clock fitted to certain car models built by the Ford Motor Company in the mid-1960s.

The steering column-mounted accessory was introduced in 1963 soon after Ford's successful participation in that year's Monte Carlo Rally, hence the name. It would go on to be fitted to the so-called "1964 1/2" Mustang, 1964 Fairlane and 1964 Falcon. Several versions were produced, depending on the application and whether or not the Rally-Pac was to be a factory installation or dealer installation. Early versions fitted to cars with the Falcon's horizontal speedometer and warning light cluster (such as the Mustang) featured the clock and tachometer pods fitted slightly higher from centerline than versions fitted to cars with round speedometers and gauges, such as those equipped with the GT performance and trim package. The tachometer on versions intended for use on cars with six-cylinder engines or base model V8 engines registered to 6000 RPM; a rare 8000 RPM version was primarily fitted to vehicles equipped with Ford's 289ci (4.7l) high performance, solid lifter V8 which redlined at 6500 RPM. By comparison, the base 1965 "Challenger 289" with its hydraulic valve lifters redlined at only 4800 RPM.

When fitted as a factory-installed item, the Rally-Pac cost US$69.30. A dealer-installed Rally-Pac cost US$75.95, a considerable sum in 1964. The accessory's usefulness combined with its rarity make original units highly collectable among Ford enthusiasts. Reproduction Rally-Pacs are available from a number of Mustang restoration sources as well.

The Rally-Pac was discontinued at the end of the 1966 model year.
