= Hurst Hemi Under Glass =

Series of exhibition drag racing cars

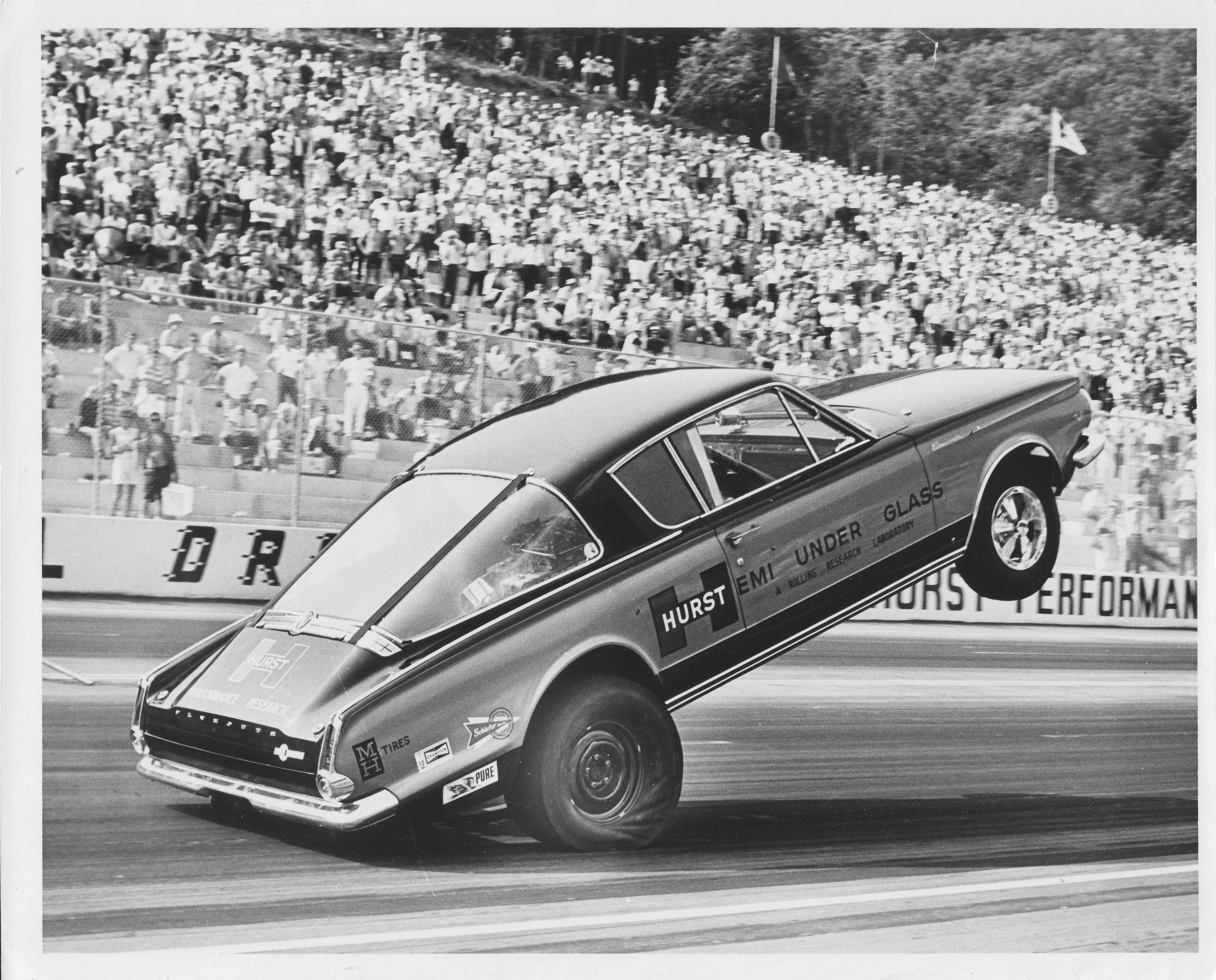
A Hemi Under Glass on two wheels

Hurst Hemi Under Glass is the name given to a series of exhibition drag racing cars campaigned by Hurst Performance between 1965 and 1970 across North America and ended with the '68 model year.

Each wheelstander was based on the current Plymouth Barracuda for the corresponding model year. The car was so named because the fuel injected Chrysler Hemi engine was placed under the Barracuda's exceptionally large rear window. The result of the rearward weight transfer was a "wheelie" down the length of the drag strip.

The Hemi Under Glass was developed by Hurst Corporation to showcase their products in the A/FX class - precursor to funny cars. In 1965, George Hurst hired Wild Bill Shrewsberry of Mansfield, OH, an accomplished drag racer who had raced for both Mickey Thompson and Jack Chrisman. After helping to pioneer it into the first wheelstanding exhibition car, Shrewsberry left at the end of the season to pursue his own project.

For the 1966 season, Bob Riggle, who was also from Mansfield, OH and was involved with Hurst as a mechanic and fabricator became the second driver of the Hurst Hemi Under Glass car and campaigned the cars with Hurst as the sponsor until later years when the Hurst Company was sold to Sunbeam. At that point, the car ran without the Hurst logo and was simply known as the "Hemi Under Glass." Riggle's career ended in 1975 with a devastating accident at US 30 Dragway in Gary, Indiana.

Popular model kits of the car were produced in 1/32 scale by Aurora Plastics Corporation and in 1/25 scale by Model Products Corporation. A limited edition 1/18 scale diecast model of the 1966 car is currently available from Highway 61.

Riggle returned to exhibition racing in 1992 with a 1966 injected version of the car and a 1968 supercharged version of the car. The original 1965 car was stripped for its power train and parts in 1967 for the new Barracuda chassis/body style and no longer exists.

While taping the June 26, 2016 episode of Jay Leno's Garage, Riggle, with Leno riding in the passenger seat, rolled a newly constructed '69 version of the Hemi Under Glass after turning sharply at the end of a wheelie run. Neither of the men were hurt, but the car sustained significant damage. Leno was riding along to fulfill another item on his 'Bucket List.'

July, 2016, Mike Mantel of New Braunfels, TX was named as the new driver of the Hemi Under Glass. Mantel took over the '68 car which has the longest performing history of any Hemi Under Glass ever constructed and becomes the third official driver in the brand's 50+ year history. Mantel was only 6 years old when the Hemi Under Glass first took to the track. He has a wide range of driving experience from drag cars, road race, and movie cars. Mantel's original hometown is the city of Hawthorne, CA.
