= Hurst Performance =

American automobile parts company (1958–1970)

Hurst Performance, Inc.
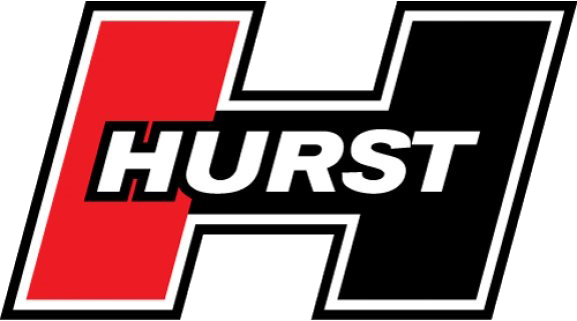
- Formerly: Hurst-Campbell
- Industry: Automotive
- Founded: 1958
- Defunct: 1970; 56 years ago
- Fate: Company defunct, brand purchased by Sunbeam Products in 1970
- Headquarters: Warminster Township, Pennsylvania, United States
- Key people: George Hurst; William Campbell
- Products: Aftermarket parts
- Owner: Sunbeam Products (1970–1987); Mr. Gasket Company (1987–2007); B&M Racing and Performance Products (2007–present)

Hurst Performance, Inc. was an American manufacturer and marketer of automobile performance parts, most notably for muscle cars. It began as a maker of motor mounts for engine swaps and floor-shifters. The product line expanded through the 1960s to include wheels and gloves among other items, and later acquired Airheart Brakes and Schiefer Manufacturing, which made clutches and other driveline components.

After a public stock offering in 1968, Hurst was taken over by Sunbeam Products in 1970. After completing the Hurst Rescue Tool project the founder left the company. After Sunbeam was bought out by Allegheny International in 1981, Hurst was purchased Cars and Concepts in 1982. Hurst was acquired by Mr. Gasket in the mid-1980s, then bought by Echlin in the 1990s, and B&M purchased the business in 2007.

== History ==
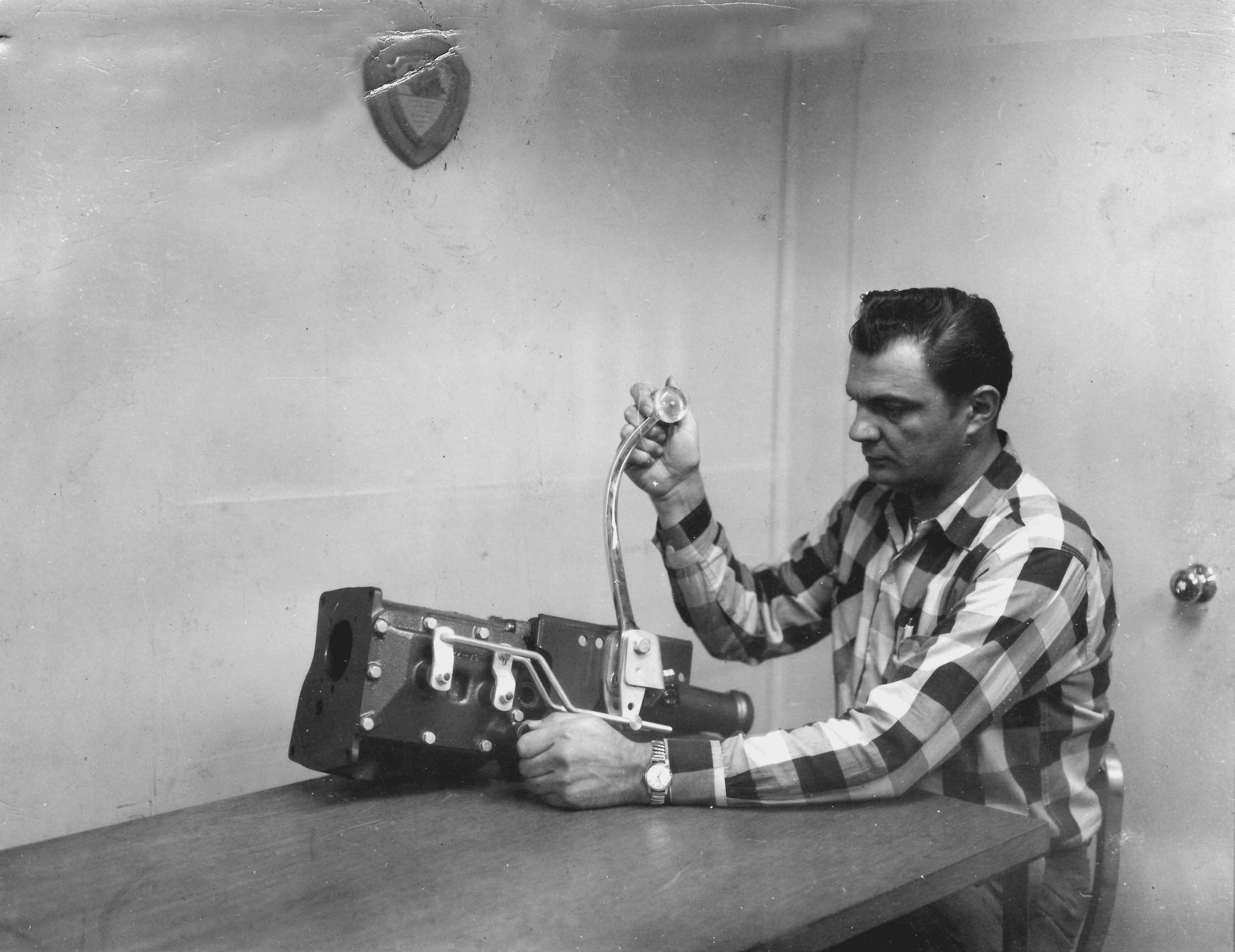
George Hurst demonstrating his new shifter c. 1953

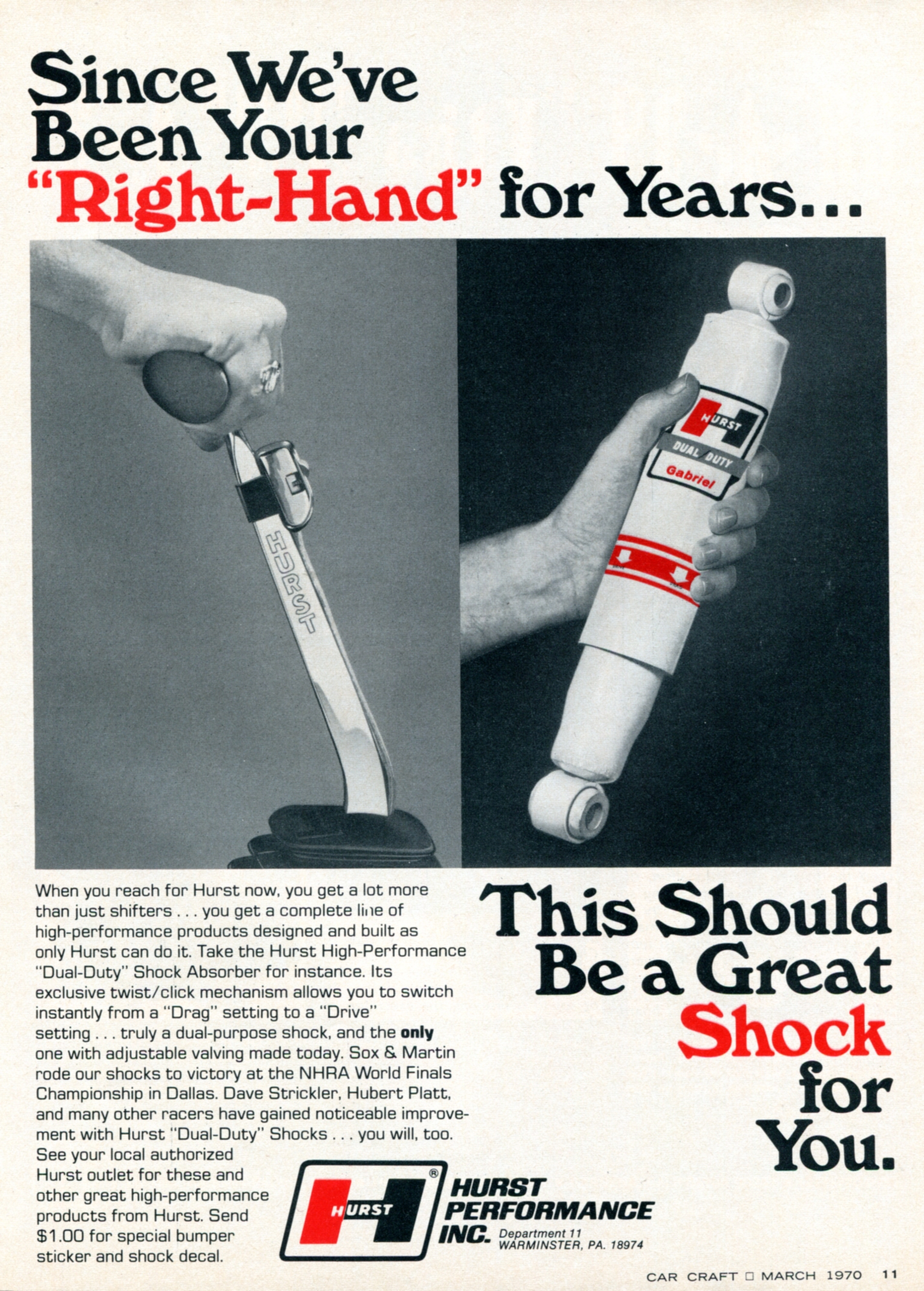
1970 ad for Hurst shock absorbers

Hurst Performance was originally named "Hurst-Campbell". The company was established in 1958 as an auto repair shop by George Hurst and Bill Campbell, both young men at the time. The original shop was located on Glenside Avenue in Glenside, Pennsylvania. They later moved to a large building on the corner of Street Road and Jacksonville Road in Warminster, PA. An older man named Lawrence Greenwald (who is credited, among other things, as one of the inventors of stretch nylon hosiery)) had his cars from his collection repaired at Hurst's shop. Greenwald saw promise in Hurst and Campbell and decided to finance them in a venture to manufacture large aftermarket, bolt-on tubular bumpers for pre-1958 Volkswagen Type 2 microbuses and trucks.

When Volkswagen began manufacturing its own bumper guards for the vehicles, Hurst-Campbell branched out into the piston-driven gearshift business. They also manufactured, at various times, engine mounts, wheels, and shift knobs in addition to their line of gearshift mechanisms.

The company's research department developed and invented the Jaws of Life. The product was spun off and sold separately when Dick Chrysler owned it.

By the early 1960s, Hurst transmission shifters and other products had become legendary in auto racing, particularly in drag racing, and among custom car makers. Automobile enthusiasts replaced the factory-standard floor or column-mounted gear sticks with custom Hurst floor shifters to obtain better control of gear selection, particularly for competitive driving.

As automotive historian Mike Mueller noted, the aura of a Hurst brand shifter became so great that "If you didn't have a Hurst shifter in your supercar, you were a mild-mannered loser." General Motors' official policy up to that time had prohibited the use of the names of outside vendors on GM products. The 1964 Pontiac GTO included a Hurst shifter. Division manager Elliot "Pete" Estes convinced GM that having the Hurst name on its cars' shifters would be an effective sales tool. The cobranding began in 1965, and Hurst teamed up with each of the domestic automakers: General Motors (GM), Ford, Chrysler, and American Motors (AMC)).

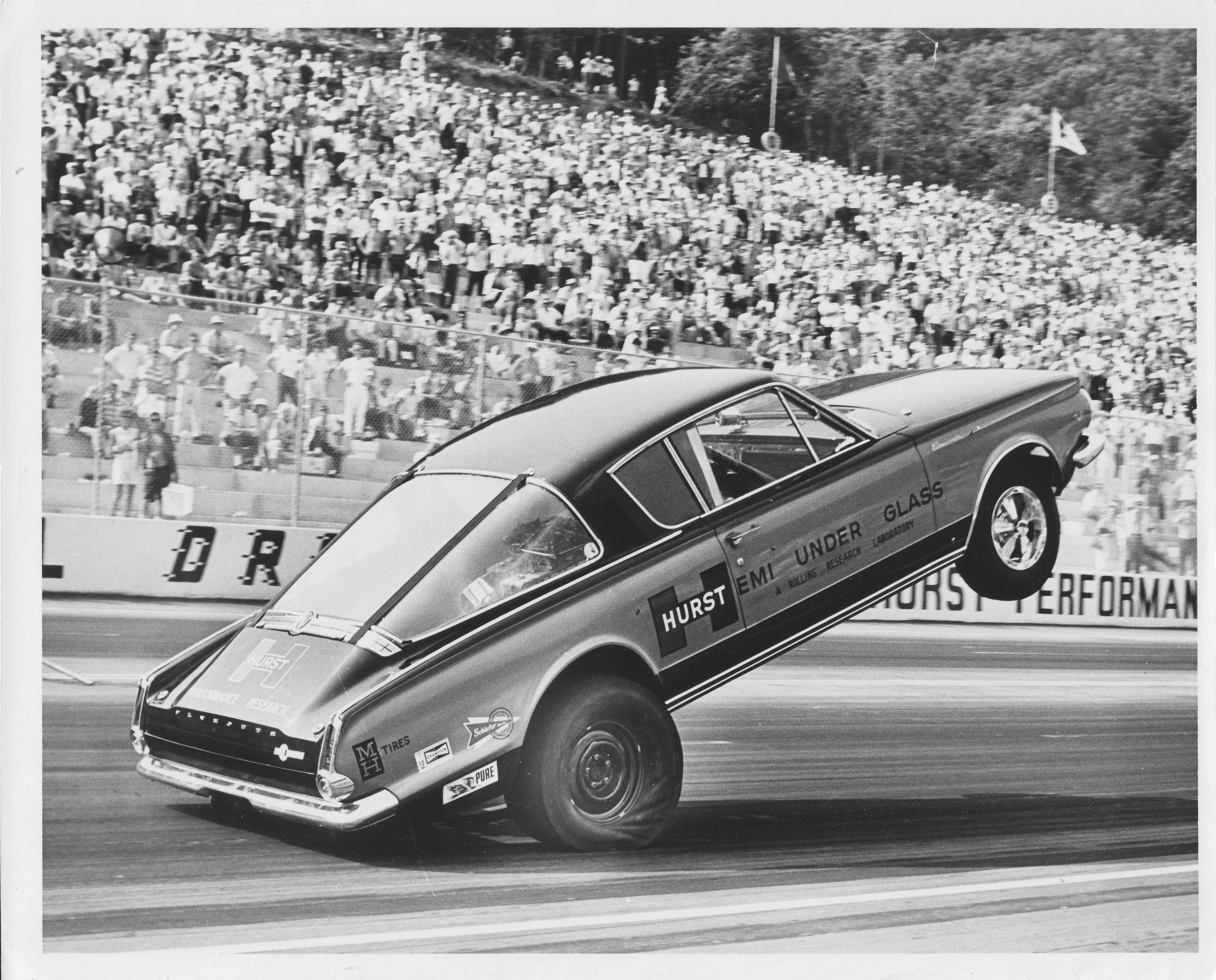
The Hemi Under Glass, a Hurst-shifter equipped 1965 Plymouth Barracuda with a 426 Hemi mounted in the rear seat, a drag strip attraction

George Hurst expanded into other specialty performance products during the 1960s by acquiring Schiefer Manufacturing, a manufacturer of clutches, and Airheart, which manufactured brake systems.

In 1968, Greenwald and Hurst took the company public in an IPO. The company was acquired in 1970 by Sunbeam Products, a manufacturer of small appliances. Hurst was promised an executive position and a seat on the board of directors as part of the buyout. However, Sunbeam did not follow through. (According to one variation of this account, Sunbeam specifically informed Mr. Greenwald and Mr. Hurst that they would no longer be affiliated with the company.) Greenwald fully retired at age 67.

George Hurst died in 1986. Lawrence Greenwald died of natural causes in 1986.

In 1977, Hurst operations were sold by Sunbeam to Richard Chrysler and became part of his Cars and Concepts Inc. operation in Brighton, Michigan. Hurst Products was later sold to the Mr. Gasket Company.

In 2007, B&M Racing and Performance Products bought the Hurst brand.

A subsidiary, called Hurst Performance Vehicles, was established in 2008 to create new renditions of Hurst vehicles, including the Hurst Challenger, Hurst Viper, and Hurst Camaro.

== Products ==
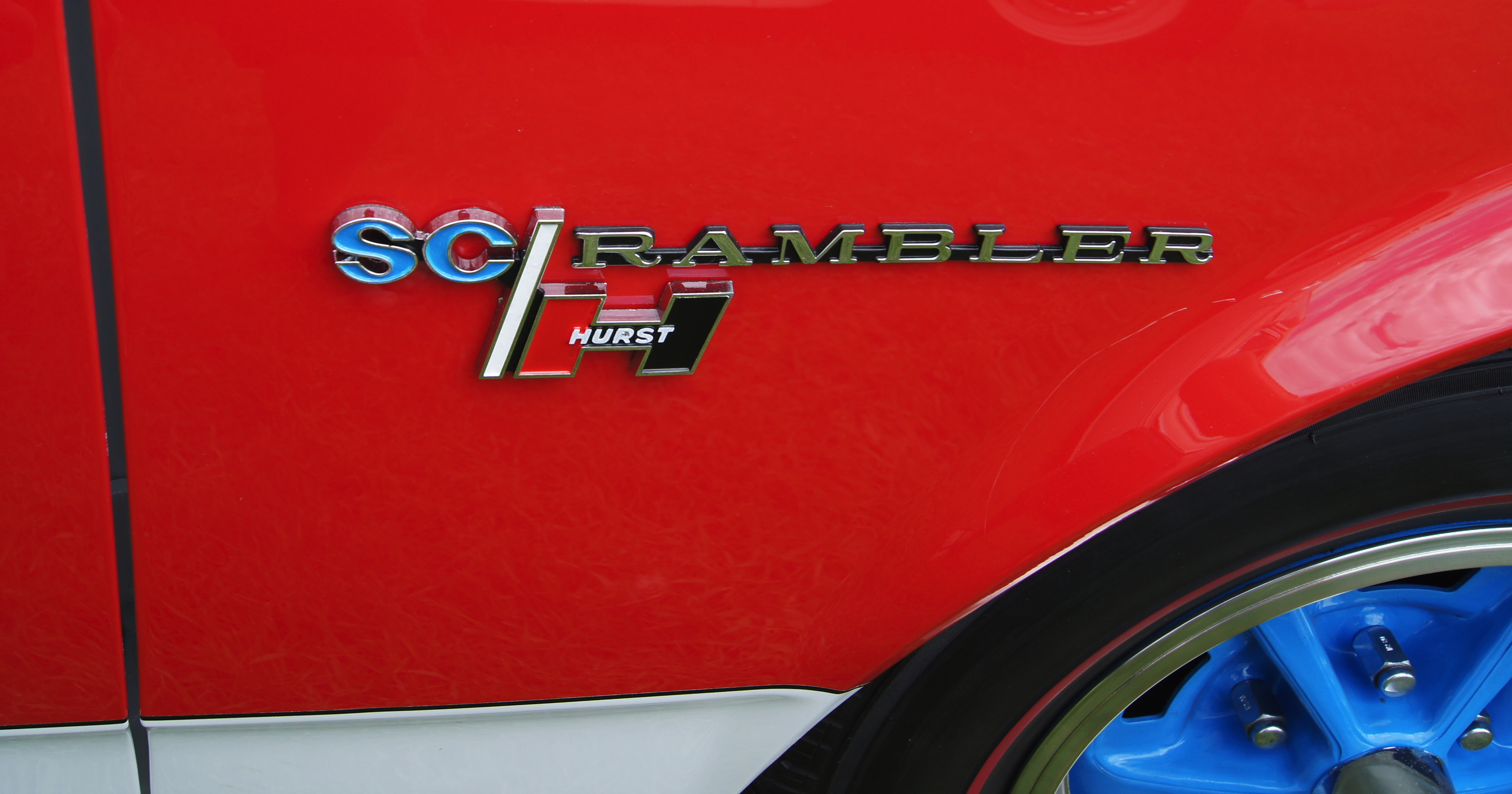
Hurst collaborated with AMC to produce the 1969 Hurst SC/Rambler, a street model made and promoted for a specific drag racing class

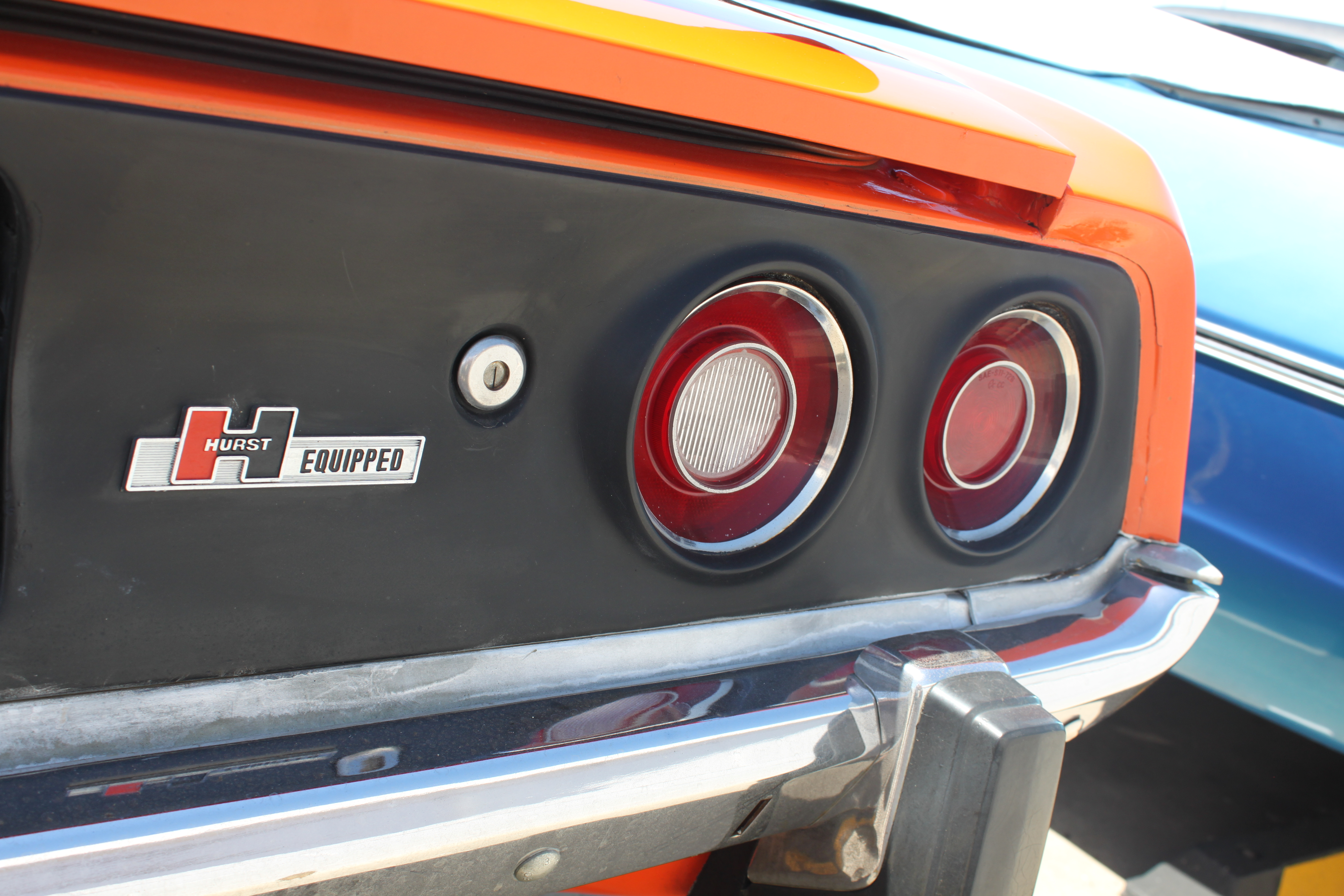
Hurst Performance logo on a 1973 Plymouth Barracuda

Hurst produced aftermarket replacement manual transmission shifters and other automobile performance-enhancing parts.

Lacking industry standards, many aftermarket road wheels were poorly engineered and built, making them prone to failure due to metal fatigue. Hurst developed a high-performance wheel with a double-dropped forged aluminum center and a heavy-duty steel rim to ensure safety.

Hurst was also an original equipment manufacturer (OEM) for automakers, providing services and components for numerous muscle car models made by AMC, Ford, Chrysler, and GM. Their products were included as standard equipment in specialty models such as AMC's The Machine (also known as the Rebel Machine), and in optional performance versions of AMC AMXs and Javelins, Chevrolet Camaros, Pontiac Firebirds, Pontiac GTOs, Oldsmobile 442s, Boss 302 and Boss 429 Mustangs, as well as Dodge Chargers, Plymouth Barracudas, and Plymouth Superbirds.

Specialty automobile models produced in cooperation with automakers that incorporated the Hurst logo or name included:

- 1969 AMC SC/Rambler
- 1970 Chrysler Hurst 300
- 1971 Hurst Jeepster
- 1971-1972 Pontiac Grand Prix SSJ
- 1972 Hurst Oldsmobile Pace Car (made by Hurst for Indy Race Day, copied at Oldsmobile dealerships)
- Several Oldsmobile Hurst/Olds models

The 1983 Hurst/Oldsmobile models included "Hurst Lightning Rods" mounted in the center console. Instead of a single shifter, three side-by-side unequal-length chrome shafts were designed to "simplify" straight-line acceleration. The Hurst/Olds was marketed for two model years, but aftermarket conversions were available for the THM200-R4 transmission, and offered for Buick, Chevrolet, and Pontiac performance cars.

Hurst Performance was also the inventor of the "Jaws of Life—a hydraulic rescue tool. It designed a complete Hurst Rescue System in the early 1970s, a specialty Emergency Medical Services (EMS) apparatus. Based on the AMC Gremlin, it served as a quicker and more compact emergency vehicle compared to the traditional heavy rescue vehicles used at motorsport race tracks and as a companion vehicle to highway emergency systems.

== See also ==
- Linda Vaughn, "Miss Hurst Golden Shifter"
