= Federal Correctional Complex, Petersburg =

United States federal prison complex for male inmates in Petersburg, Virginia

Coordinates: 37.296787°N 77.348468°W

- Interactive map of Federal Correctional Complex, Petersburg
- Location: Prince George County, near Hopewell, Virginia
- Status: Operational
- Security class: Low and medium-security (with minimum-security prison camp)
- Population: 3,400 (1,111 at Low; 1,595 at Medium; and 293 at minimum-security camp)
- Managed by: Federal Bureau of Prisons

The Federal Correctional Complex, Petersburg (FCC Petersburg) is a United States federal prison complex for male inmates in Petersburg, Virginia. It is operated by the Federal Bureau of Prisons, a division of the United States Department of Justice.

The complex consists of two facilities:

- Federal Correctional Institution, Petersburg Low: a low-security facility with an adjacent satellite prison camp for minimum-security inmates.
- Federal Correctional Institution, Petersburg Medium: a medium-security facility.

FCC Petersburg is located 25 miles southeast of Richmond, Virginia, the state capital. It lies in the northwesternmost part of Prince George County, just west of Hopewell, Virginia.

FCC Petersburg is located in Prince George County, 25 miles southeast of Richmond, Virginia, the state capital. It lies just west of the independent city of Hopewell, Virginia.

== Facility and programs ==
FCI Petersburg offers numerous educational opportunities, including a GED Program, English as-a-Second Language, Occupational Education, Post-Secondary Education, Adult Continuing Education, as well as Parenting Classes and Release Preparation. The facility also has a Law Library which compliant inmates may use periodically.

FCI Petersburg is one of several federal prison facilities which offer sex offender treatment programs. The Sex Offender Management Program (SOMP) at FCI Petersburg was established to assist in effectively managing the Bureau of Prisons' population of offenders with sex offense histories. The program consists of assessment/evaluation, treatment, and monitoring/managing components. The assessment/evaluation component of SOMP is non-voluntary because it assists correctional staff in determining whether the inmate is likely to engage in risk relevant behavior while incarcerated. The remaining elements of the program are voluntary.

FCC Petersburg facilities
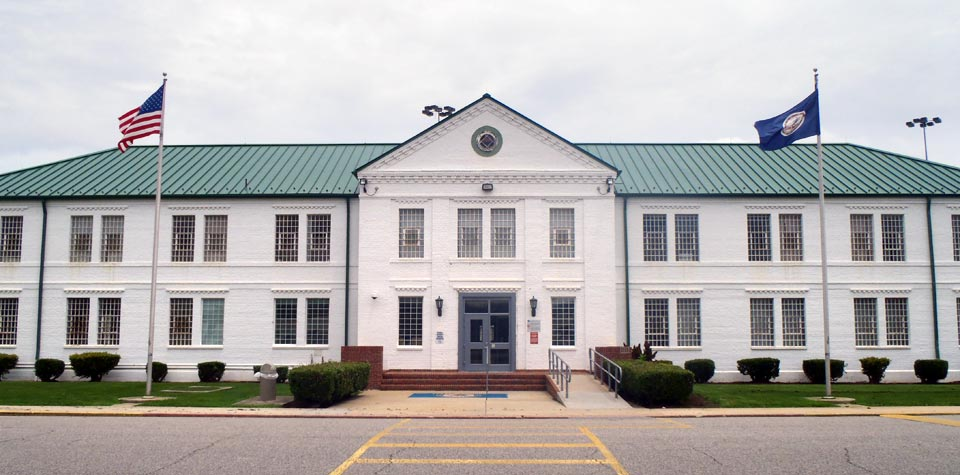
FCI Petersburg Low

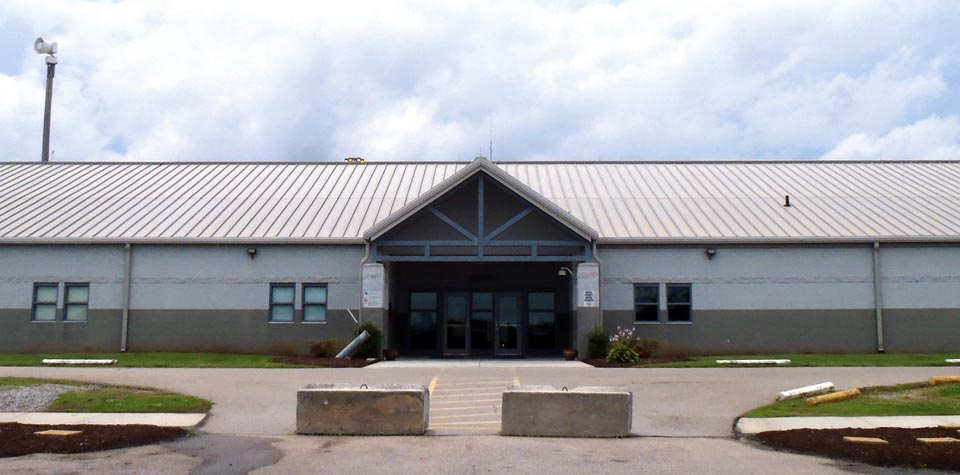
FCI Petersburg Medium

== Notable incidents ==
In 2008, a joint investigation conducted by the FBI and the Bureau of Prisons found that an inmate at FCI Petersburg, John Leighnor, was coordinating an ongoing identity-theft scheme from the facility. Leighnor was already serving a 7-year-sentence dating from a conviction in 2003 for another identity-theft scheme. Armed with the names of his victims, Leighnor drafted correspondence to be sent by mail to various governmental agencies and other organizations to obtain official documentation for his targets. In connection with each mailing, Leighnor either claimed that he was the person he was victimizing or that he was a lawyer, advocate, or other designated representative for a targeted victim. He requested the victim's personal documentation, such as birth certificates, family information, undergraduate transcripts, enrollment applications, and death certificates. Leighnor directed that all return correspondence be sent to his attention at various addresses, including: "Dept. 14375-077, P.O. Box 1000, Petersburg, Virginia 23804." He concealed the fact that the correspondence would be delivered to him at FCI Petersburg and that "14375-077" was his federal prisoner identification number.

Upon receiving the victim's identifying information, Leighnor planned to obtain passports, birth certificates, driver's licenses, and other identification documents for himself in the victims' names, to be used in traveling and obtaining funds from financial institutions and individuals. Leighnor also possessed documents and made statements to other inmates at FCI Petersburg about his plans to file claims with the Claims Resolution Tribunal (the entity charged with handling claims on Swiss bank accounts believed to have been abandoned by victims of Nazi persecution during World War II), in order to gain control of abandoned funds in the Swiss bank accounts connected to Holocaust victims.

In 2009, Leighnor was sentenced to an additional 8 years in prison for mail fraud and identity theft related to the FCI Petersburg scheme. He was held at the Federal Correctional Institution, Fort Dix, a low-security facility in New Jersey. He was released in 2016 after completing his sentence.

A joint investigation conducted by the FBI and the Department of Justice Inspector General found that a correction officer at FCC Petersburg, Keif Jackson, conspired with inmate Walter Brooks to smuggle heroin inside the facility. In 2008, Brooks recruited Jackson to smuggle heroin to him in the prison. At Brooks' request, Officer Jackson contacted acquaintances of Brooks. He met with them on several occasions to obtain heroin, and smuggled the drugs into the prison. After Brooks was released from FCC Petersburg in 2010, Brooks began supplying heroin to Jackson to smuggle into the prison. Approximately one year later, on Oct. 10, 2011, Jackson was stopped by the police on his way to work. Upon searching his vehicle, officers recovered a package containing heroin.

Jackson entered a guilty plea to conspiracy to distribute heroin in March 2012 and was sentenced to 12 months in prison.

In September 2012, a federal jury convicted Brooks, 57, of conspiracy to provide contraband to inmates, conspiracy to distribute heroin, five counts of providing contraband to inmates, and three counts of use of a communication facility to commit a felony.

On June 18, 2022, four inmates were discovered missing from the FCC Petersburg satellite campus. Authorities notified United States Marshals Service, Federal Bureau of Investigation, and other law enforcement agencies. The inmates were named as

- Corey Branch, age 41, was serving a sentence for a conviction in the United States District Court for the Eastern District of Virginia for possession with intent to distribute fentanyl and for possessing a firearm as a felon.
- Tavares Lajuane Graham, age 44, was serving a sentence for a conviction in the United States District Court for the Eastern District of North Carolina for possession of cocaine and cocaine base with intent to sell, as well as possession of a firearm in furtherance of a drug trafficking crime. His original residence was Hope Mills, North Carolina
- Lamonte Rashawn Willis, age 30, was serving a sentence for a conviction in the Eastern District of Virginia for possessing and concealing a stolen firearm and possession of a firearm by a convicted felon. His original residence was Suffolk, Virginia.
- Kareem Allen Shaw, age 46, was serving a sentence for a conviction in the United States District Court for the Western District of Virginia for conspiracy to possess with intent to distribute a measurable quantity of heroin. His original residence was Harrisonburg, Virginia.

== Notable inmates (current and former) ==
=== Medium Security ===
Inmate Name	Register Number	Photo	Status	Details
Eric Justin Toth	32508-016		Now at FCI Fort Dix. Scheduled for release in 2034.	Former Washington, D.C. elementary school teacher and FBI Ten Most Wanted fugitive; apprehended in Nicaragua in 2013 after five years on the run; pleaded guilty in 2013 to production of child pornography.
Roger Loughry Sr.	43691-037		Now at FCI Butner. Scheduled for release in 2034.	Administrator of "The Cache," an online bulletin board where hundreds of child pornographers from around the world shared images and videos of children being molested; convicted in 2013 of advertising and distributing child pornography.
Richard Chandler	44076-074		Serving a 35-year sentence, scheduled for release in 2032.	Former Tennessee police officer; arrested in the largest child pornography prosecution in US history; pleaded guilty in 2012 to contributing to "Dreamboard," a website whose members produced and traded images and videos of adults molesting children.
David A. Kaye	71353-083		Released from custody in 2016 after serving 6 years.	Jewish rabbi; convicted in 2006 of coercion and traveling with intent to engage in illicit sexual conduct for trying to solicit sex from a 13-year-old boy over the Internet in 2005; featured on the Dateline NBC series To Catch a Predator.
Michael Sarno	01042-424		Currently serving a 25-year sentence, scheduled for release in 2031. Now at MCFP Springfield.	Italian-American mobster, who is a powerful captain in the Chicago Outfit who leads the Cicero crew.
Thomas Sweatt	38792-037		Scheduled for release in 2095.	Serial arsonist. Plead guilty to various counts including first-degree and second-degree murder.

=== Minimum Security ===
Inmate Name	Register Number	Photo	Status	Details
Chad Arrington	64760-037		Serving two years and six months, released in March 2023.	Rapper sentenced after pleading guilty to conspiracy to commit wire fraud after using his employer's company card to make $4.1 million in unauthorized purchases to boost his career.
Sharpe James	28791-050		Released from custody in 2010 after serving 18 months.	Mayor of Newark, New Jersey from 1986 to 2006; convicted of fraud in 2008 for selling city properties to his girlfriend, Tamika Riley, for a fraction of their actual cost.
Sabri Benkahla	46867-083		Served a 10-year sentence; released in May 2016.	Member of the Virginia jihad network; convicted in 2007 of perjury and obstruction of justice for lying to FBI agents and a grand jury investigating a training camp run by Lashkar-e-Taiba, a Pakistani terrorist organization with ties to al-Qaeda.
Juelz Santana	71438-050		Served a 27 month prison sentence, released February 21, 2021	American Rapper who bought a loaded handgun and Oxycodone at the Newark Liberty International Airport.
Mark Siljander	20611-045		Released on January 13, 2013 after serving a 1-year sentence.	Michigan Congressman from 1981 to 1987; pleaded guilty in 2010 to obstruction of justice and acting as an unregistered foreign agent related to his work for the Islamic American Relief Agency, a charity with ties to Al-Qaeda and the Taliban.
Tarik Shah	53145-054		Released on June 22, 2018 after serving a 15-year sentence.	Jazz musician and karate master; pleaded guilty in 2007 to conspiracy to provide material support to al-Qaeda for agreeing to provide martial arts and hand-to-hand combat training to al-Qaeda members.
Deric Lostutter	21103-032		Spent a brief time in Medium Security, before being transferred to minimum. Released on September 11, 2018 from Residential Reentry Management housing in Cincinnati.	Anonymous activist who arranged the hacking of the Big Red website in connection with the Steubenville High School rape case.
Noah McHugh	21049-032		Released on November 7, 2017 from federal Residential Reentry Management housing in Baltimore.	Hacker who carried out the aforementioned hack on behalf of Deric Lostutter.
Marion Barry	14856-016		Served 6 months, released in 1992 from FCI Loretto.	Convicted in 1991 of perjury and drug possession.

== See also ==
- List of U.S. federal prisons
- Federal Bureau of Prisons
- Incarceration in the United States
