= 2006 United States House of Representatives elections in Michigan =

- November 7, 2006

All 15 Michigan seats to the United States House of Representatives
	Majority party	Minority party
Party	Republican	Democratic
Last election	9	6
Seats won	9	6
Seat change	Steady	Steady
Popular vote	1,624,865	1,923,485
Percentage	44.56%	52.75%
Swing	▼4.85%	▲4.33%

Republican
40–50%
50–60%
60–70%
70–80%
Democratic
40–50%
50–60%
60–70%
70–80%
80–90%
>90%

The 2006 congressional elections in Michigan was held on November 7, 2006, to determine who would represent the state of Michigan in the United States House of Representatives. Michigan had fifteen seats in the House, apportioned according to the 2000 United States census. Representatives are elected for two-year terms. All fifteen incumbents ran for re-election, and all of them were re-elected except Joe Schwarz, who lost his primary.

Michigan was one of seven states in which the party that won the state's popular vote did not win a majority of seats in 2006, the other states being Indiana, New Mexico, Nevada, Ohio, Iowa, and Wisconsin.

== Overview ==
United States House of Representatives elections in Michigan, 2006
Party	Votes	Percentage	Seats before	Seats after	+/–
Democratic	1,923,485	52.75%	6	6	-
Republican	1,624,865	44.56%	9	9	-
Libertarian	45,435	1.25%	0	0	-
Green	25,047	0.69%	0	0	-
U.S. Taxpayers	23,102	0.63%	0	0	-
Write-in	2,630	0.07%	0	0	-
Independent	1,862	0.05%	0	0	-
Total	3,646,426	100.00%	15	15	—

=== Match-up summary ===
District	Incumbent	2006 Result	Democratic	Republican	Libertarian	Green	Constitution	Other
1	Bart Stupak	Re-elected	Bart Stupak	Don Hooper	Ken Proctor	David Newland	Josh Warren	
2	Pete Hoekstra	Re-elected	Kimon Kotos	Pete Hoekstra	Steven Van Til		Ronald Graeser	
3	Vern Ehlers	Re-elected	James Rinck	Vern Ehlers	Jeff Steinport	Roger Gurk		
4	David Lee Camp	Re-elected	Mike Huckleberry	David Lee Camp	Allitta Hren		John Emerick	
5	Dale Kildee	Re-elected	Dale Kildee	Eric Klammer	Steve Samoranski	Ken Mathenia		
6	Fred Upton	Re-elected	Kim Clark	Fred Upton	Ken Howe			
7	Joe Schwarz	Lost primary	Sharon Renier	Tim Walberg	Robert Hutchinson		David Horn	
8	Mike Rogers	Re-elected	Jim Marcinkowski	Mike Rogers	Dick Gach	Aaron Stuttman		
9	Joe Knollenberg	Re-elected	Nancy Skinner	Joe Knollenberg	Adam Goodman	Matthew Abel		
10	Candice Miller	Re-elected	Robert Denison	Candice Miller	Mark Byrne	Candace Caveny	F Gualdoni	
11	Thad McCotter	Re-elected	Tony Trupiano	Thad McCotter	John Tatar		Charles Tackett	
12	Sander M. Levin	Re-elected	Sander M. Levin	Randell Shafer	Andy Lecureaux	Art Myatt	Les Townsend	Jerome White (I)
13	Carolyn Cheeks Kilpatrick	Re-elected unopposed	Carolyn Cheeks Kilpatrick					
14	John Conyers	Re-elected	John Conyers	Chad Miles				
15	John Dingell	Re-elected	John Dingell		Greg Stempfle	Aimee Smith	Robert Czak	

== District 1 ==
2006 Michigan's 1st congressional district election
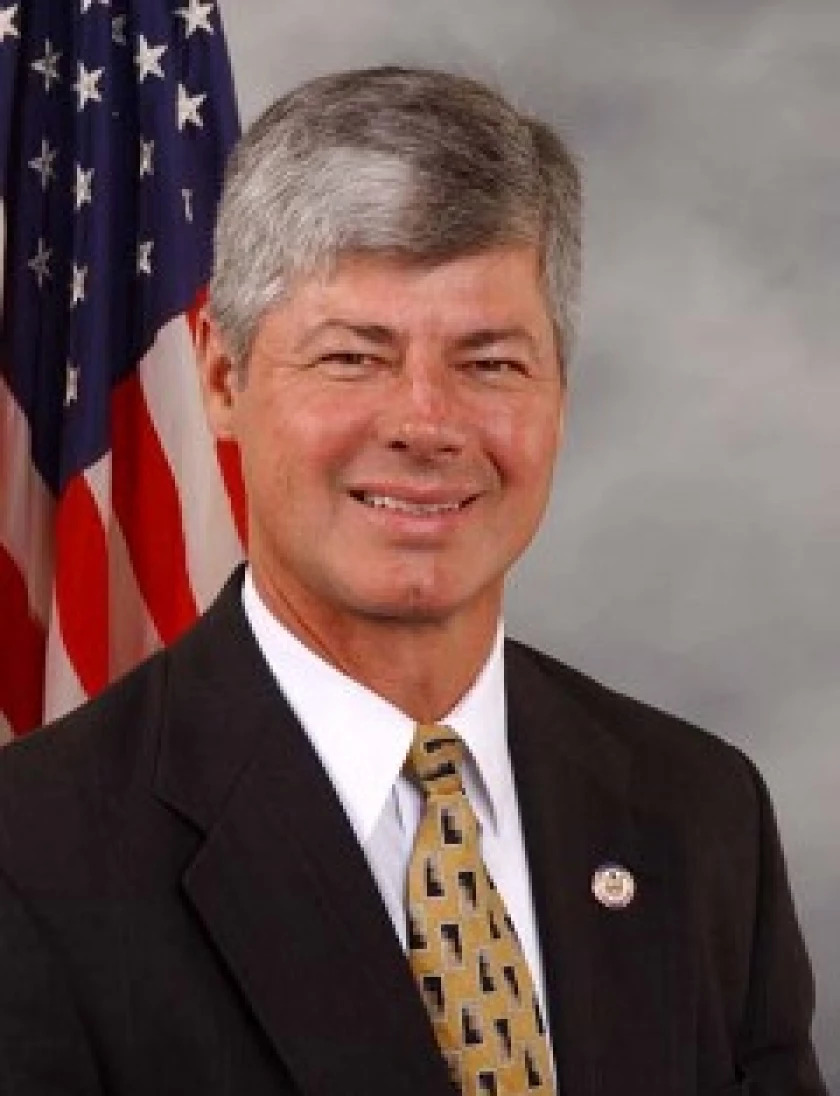

Nominee	Bart Stupak	Don Hooper
Party	Democratic	Republican
Popular vote	180,448	72,753
Percentage	69.4%	28.0%
- County results Stupak 50–60% 60–70% 70–80%
U.S. Representative before election
Bart Stupak
Democratic
Elected U.S. Representative
Bart Stupak
Democratic

Incumbent Democrat Bart Stupak won re-election to an eighth term.

=== Predictions ===
Source	Ranking	As of
The Cook Political Report	Safe D	November 6, 2006
Rothenberg	Safe D	November 6, 2006
Sabato's Crystal Ball	Safe D	November 6, 2006
Real Clear Politics	Safe D	November 7, 2006
CQ Politics	Safe D	November 7, 2006

General election results
Party	Candidate	Votes	%
Democratic	Bart Stupak (incumbent)	180,448	69.4%
Republican	Don Hooper	72,753	28.0%
Constitution	Josh Warren	2,278	0.9%
Green	David Newland	2,252	0.9%
Libertarian	Ken Proctor	2,196	0.8%

== District 2 ==
2006 Michigan's 2nd congressional district election
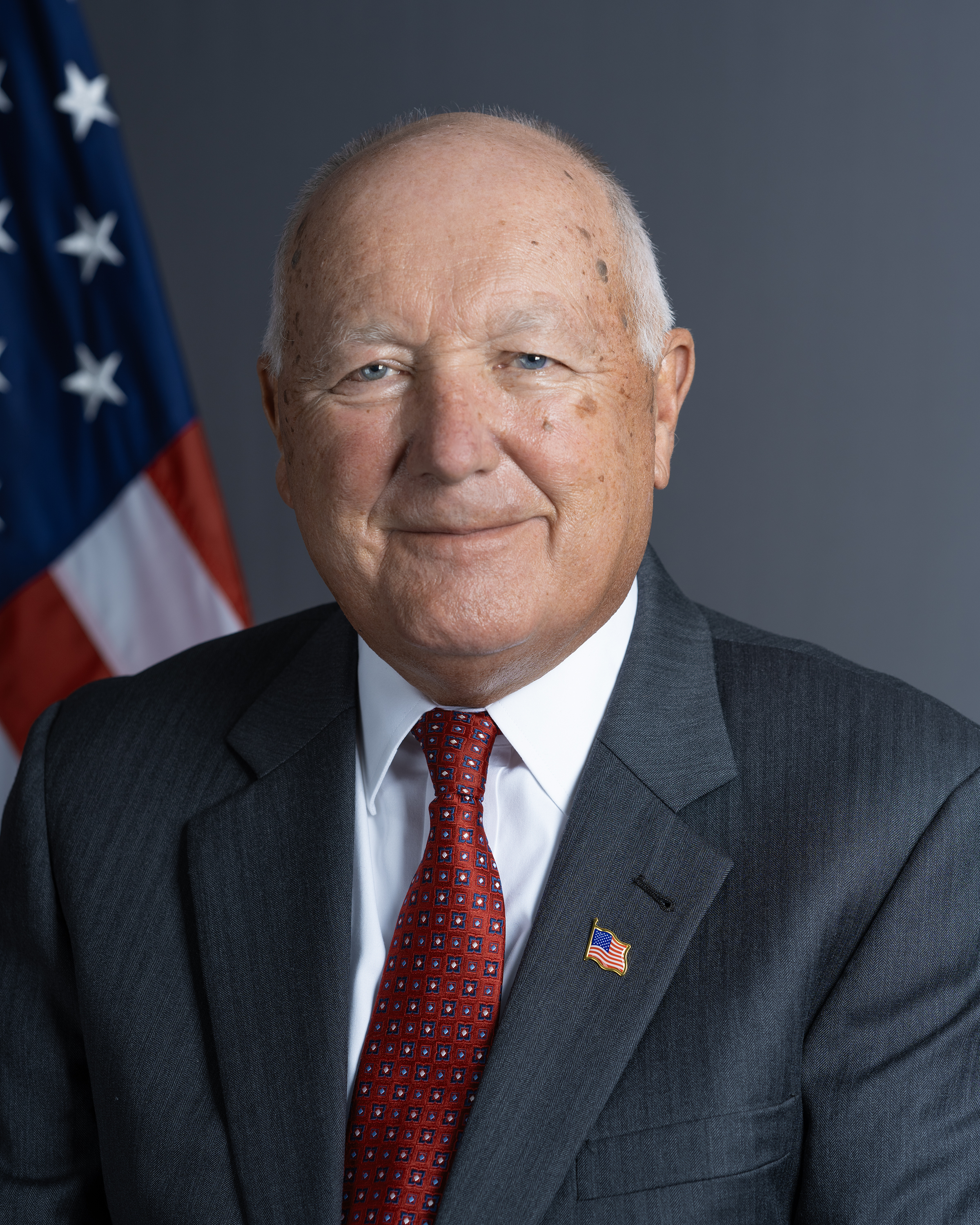

Nominee	Pete Hoekstra	Kimon Kotos
Party	Republican	Democratic
Popular vote	182,879	86,803
Percentage	66.0%	32.0%
- County results Hoekstra: 50–60% 60–70% 70–80%
U.S. Representative before election
Pete Hoekstra
Republican
Elected U.S. Representative
incumbent
Republican

Incumbent Republican Pete Hoekstra won re-election to an eighth term.

=== Predictions ===
Source	Ranking	As of
The Cook Political Report	Safe R	November 6, 2006
Rothenberg	Safe R	November 6, 2006
Sabato's Crystal Ball	Safe R	November 6, 2006
Real Clear Politics	Safe R	November 7, 2006
CQ Politics	Safe R	November 7, 2006

General election results
Republican	Pete Hoekstra (incumbent)	182,879	66
Democratic	Kimon Kotos	86,803	32
Constitution	Ronald Graeser	2,721	1
Libertarian	Steven Van Til	2,716	1
Party	Candidate	Votes	%

== District 3 ==
2006 Michigan's 3rd congressional district election
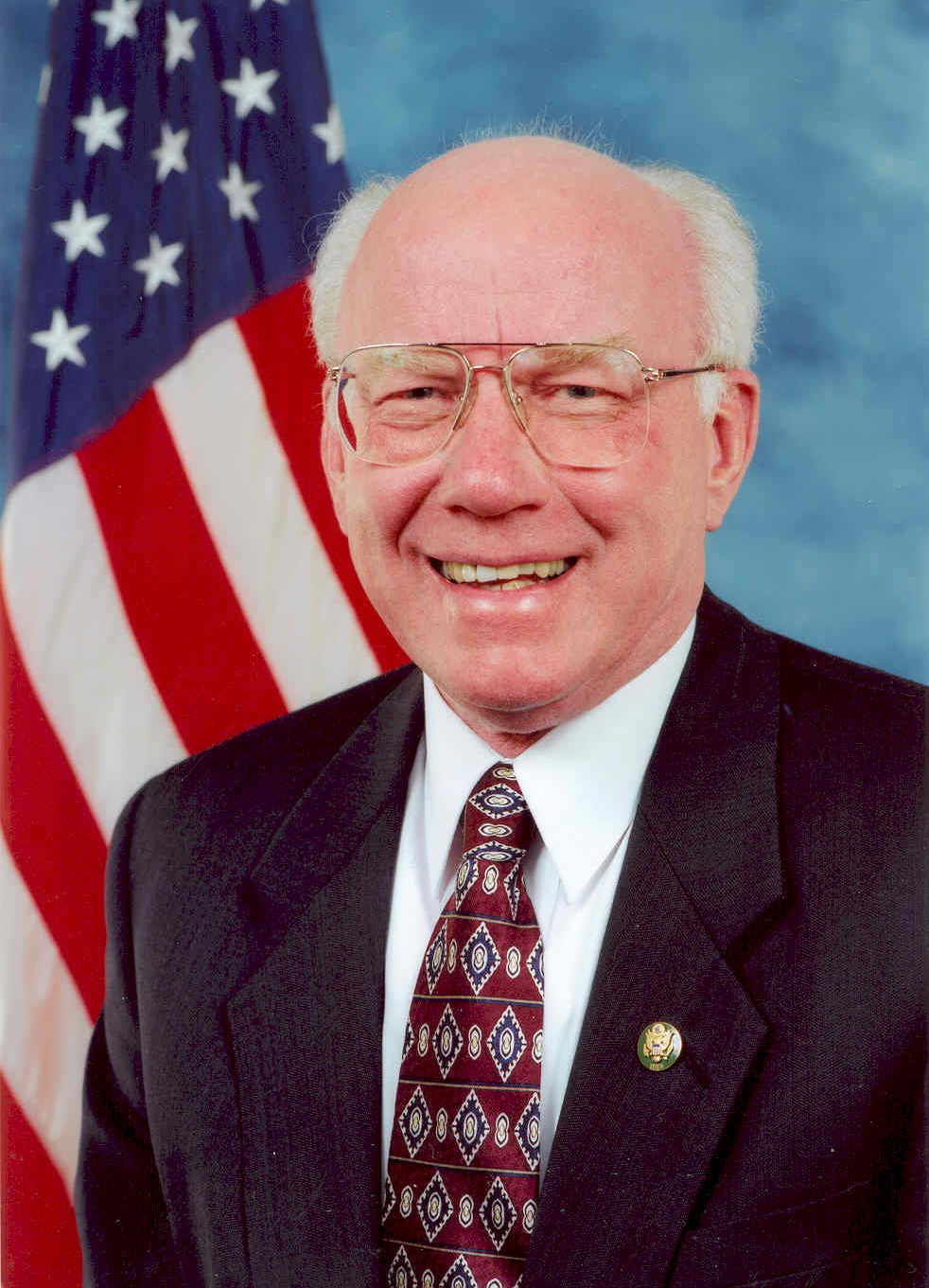

Nominee	Vern Ehlers	James Rinck
Party	Republican	Democratic
Popular vote	171,182	93,850
Percentage	63.0%	35.0%
- County results Ehlers: 60–70%
U.S. Representative before election
Vern Ehlers
Republican
Elected U.S. Representative
incumbent
Republican

Incumbent Republican Vern Ehlers won re-election to an eighth term.

=== Predictions ===
Source	Ranking	As of
The Cook Political Report	Safe R	November 6, 2006
Rothenberg	Safe R	November 6, 2006
Sabato's Crystal Ball	Safe R	November 6, 2006
Real Clear Politics	Safe R	November 7, 2006
CQ Politics	Safe R	November 7, 2006

General election results
Party	Candidate	Votes	%
Republican	Vern Ehlers (incumbent)	171,182	63
Democratic	James Rinck	93,850	35
Libertarian	Jeff Steinport	3,702	1
Green	Roger Gurk	2,593	1

== District 4 ==
2006 Michigan's 4th congressional district election
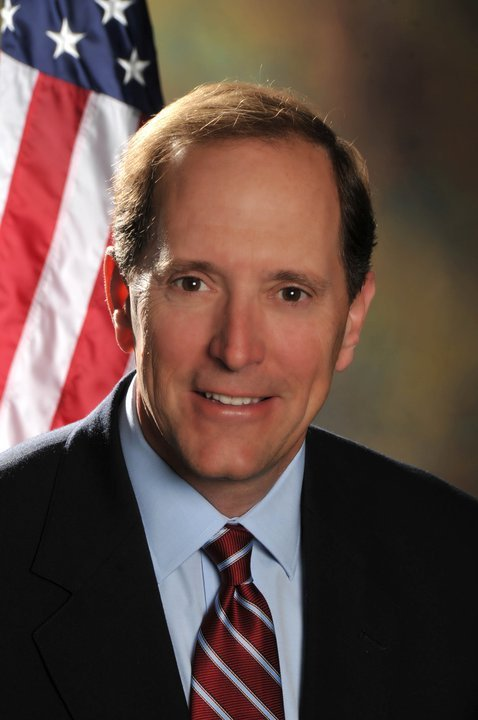

Nominee	Dave Camp	Mike Huckleberry
Party	Republican	Democratic
Popular vote	160,767	100,679
Percentage	60.0%	38.0%
- County results Camp: 50–60% 60–70% 70–80%
U.S. Representative before election
David Lee Camp
Republican
Elected U.S. Representative
David Lee Camp
Republican

Incumbent Republican David Lee Camp won re-election to a ninth term.

=== Predictions ===
Source	Ranking	As of
The Cook Political Report	Safe R	November 6, 2006
Rothenberg	Safe R	November 6, 2006
Sabato's Crystal Ball	Safe R	November 6, 2006
Real Clear Politics	Safe R	November 7, 2006
CQ Politics	Safe R	November 7, 2006

General election results
Party	Candidate	Votes	%
Republican	Dave Camp (incumbent)	160,767	60
Democratic	Mike Huckleberry	100,679	38
Constitution	John Emerick	2,007	1
Libertarian	Allitta Hrren	1,940	1

== District 5 ==
2006 Michigan's 5th congressional district election
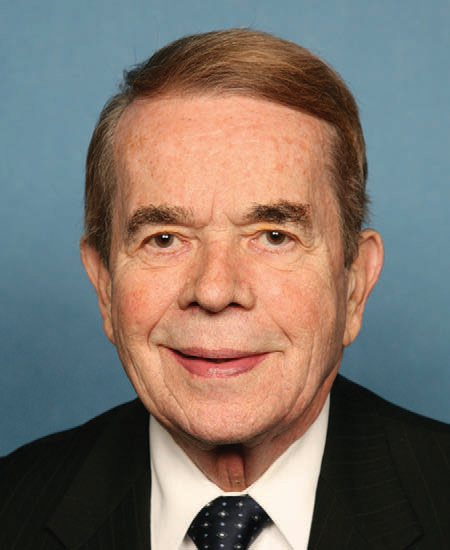

Nominee	Dale Kildee	Eric Klammer
Party	Democratic	Republican
Popular vote	176,144	60,957
Percentage	73.0%	25.0%
- County results Kildee 60–70% 70–80%
U.S. Representative before election
Dale Kildee
Democratic
Elected U.S. Representative
Dale Kildee
Democratic

Incumbent Democratic Dale Kildee won re-election to a thirteenth term.

=== Predictions ===
Source	Ranking	As of
The Cook Political Report	Safe D	November 6, 2006
Rothenberg	Safe D	November 6, 2006
Sabato's Crystal Ball	Safe D	November 6, 2006
Real Clear Politics	Safe D	November 7, 2006
CQ Politics	Safe D	November 7, 2006

General election results
Party	Candidate	Votes	%
Democratic	Dale Kildee (incumbent)	176,144	73
Republican	Eric Klammer	60,957	25
Green	Ken Mathenia	2,293	1
Libertarian	Steve Samoranski	2,259	1

== District 6 ==
2006 Michigan's 6th congressional district election
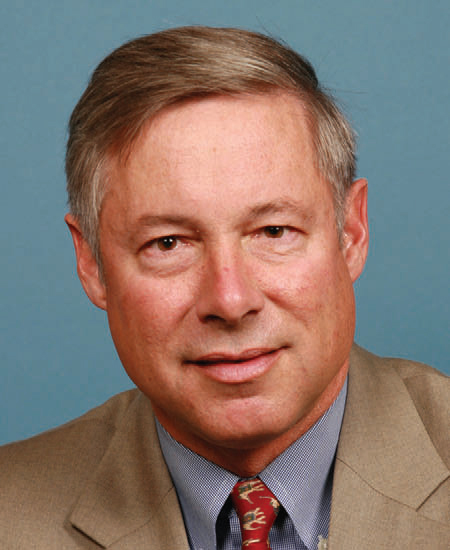

Nominee	Fred Upton	Kim Clarke
Party	Republican	Democratic
Popular vote	142,015	88,976
Percentage	61.0%	38.0%
- County results Upton: 50–60% 60–70%
U.S. Representative before election
Fred Upton
Republican
Elected U.S. Representative
incumbent
Republican

Incumbent Republican Fred Upton won re-election to an eleventh term.

=== Predictions ===
Source	Ranking	As of
The Cook Political Report	Safe R	November 6, 2006
Rothenberg	Safe R	November 6, 2006
Sabato's Crystal Ball	Safe R	November 6, 2006
Real Clear Politics	Safe R	November 7, 2006
CQ Politics	Safe R	November 7, 2006

General election results
Party	Candidate	Votes	%
Republican	Fred Upton (incumbent)	142,015	61
Democratic	Kim Clarke	88,976	38
Libertarian	Ken Howe	3,480	1

== District 7 ==
2006 Michigan's 7th congressional district election
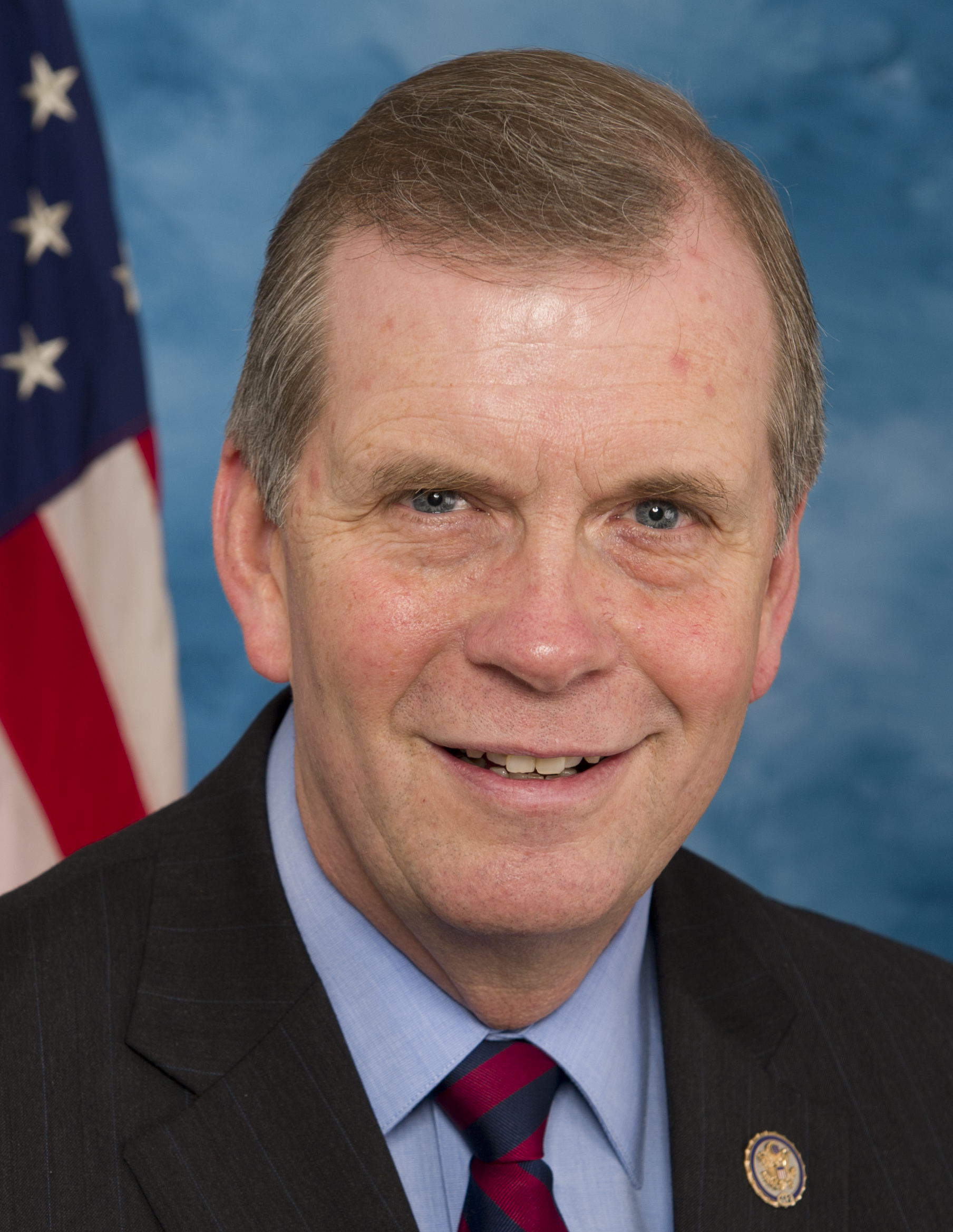

Nominee	Tim Walberg	Sharon Renier
Party	Republican	Democratic
Popular vote	122,640	112,623
Percentage	51.0%	46.0%
- County results Walberg: 50–60% 60–70% Renier: 40–50%
U.S. Representative before election
Joe Schwarz
Republican
Elected U.S. Representative
Tim Walberg
Republican

Republican Tim Walberg defeated the incumbent in the primary, and won the general election.

=== Predictions ===
Source	Ranking	As of
The Cook Political Report	Likely R	November 6, 2006
Rothenberg	Safe R	November 6, 2006
Sabato's Crystal Ball	Likely R	November 6, 2006
Real Clear Politics	Safe R	November 7, 2006
CQ Politics	Likely R	November 7, 2006

General election results
Party	Candidate	Votes	%
Republican	Tim Walberg	122,640	51
Democratic	Sharon Renier	112,623	46
Libertarian	Robert Hutchinson	3,787	2
Constitution	David Horn	3,664	1

== District 8 ==
2006 Michigan's 8th congressional district election

Nominee	Mike Rogers	Jim Marcinkowski
Party	Republican	Democratic
Popular vote	156,414	121,576
Percentage	55.2%	42.9%
U.S. Representative before election
Mike Rogers
Republican
Elected U.S. Representative
incumbent
Republican

Incumbent Republican Mike Rogers won re-election to a fourth term.

=== Predictions ===
Source	Ranking	As of
The Cook Political Report	Safe R	November 6, 2006
Rothenberg	Safe R	November 6, 2006
Sabato's Crystal Ball	Safe R	November 6, 2006
Real Clear Politics	Safe R	November 7, 2006
CQ Politics	Likely R	November 7, 2006

General election results
Party	Candidate	Votes	%
Republican	Mike Rogers (incumbent)	156,414	55.2%
Democratic	Jim Marcinkowski	121,576	42.9%
Libertarian	Dick Gach	2,756	1.0%
Green	Aaron Stuttman	2,349	0.8%

== District 9 ==
2006 Michigan's 9th congressional district election
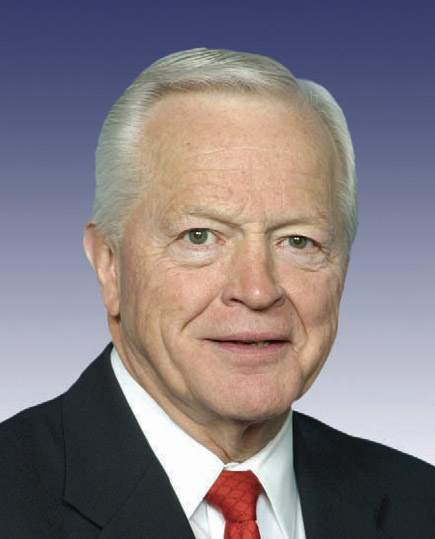

Nominee	Joe Knollenberg	Nancy Skinner
Party	Republican	Democratic
Popular vote	142,279	127,651
Percentage	52.0%	46.0%
- County results Knollenberg: 50–60%
U.S. Representative before election
Joe Knollenberg
Republican
Elected U.S. Representative
incumbent
Republican

Incumbent Republican Joe Knollenberg won re-election to an eighth term.

=== Predictions ===
Source	Ranking	As of
The Cook Political Report	Safe R	November 6, 2006
Rothenberg	Safe R	November 6, 2006
Sabato's Crystal Ball	Safe R	November 6, 2006
Real Clear Politics	Safe R	November 7, 2006
CQ Politics	Safe R	November 7, 2006

General election results
Party	Candidate	Votes	%
Republican	Joe Knollenberg (incumbent)	142,279	52
Democratic	Nancy Skinner	127,651	46
Libertarian	Adam Goodman	3,698	1
Green	Matthew Abel	2,466	1

== District 10 ==
2006 Michigan's 10th congressional district election
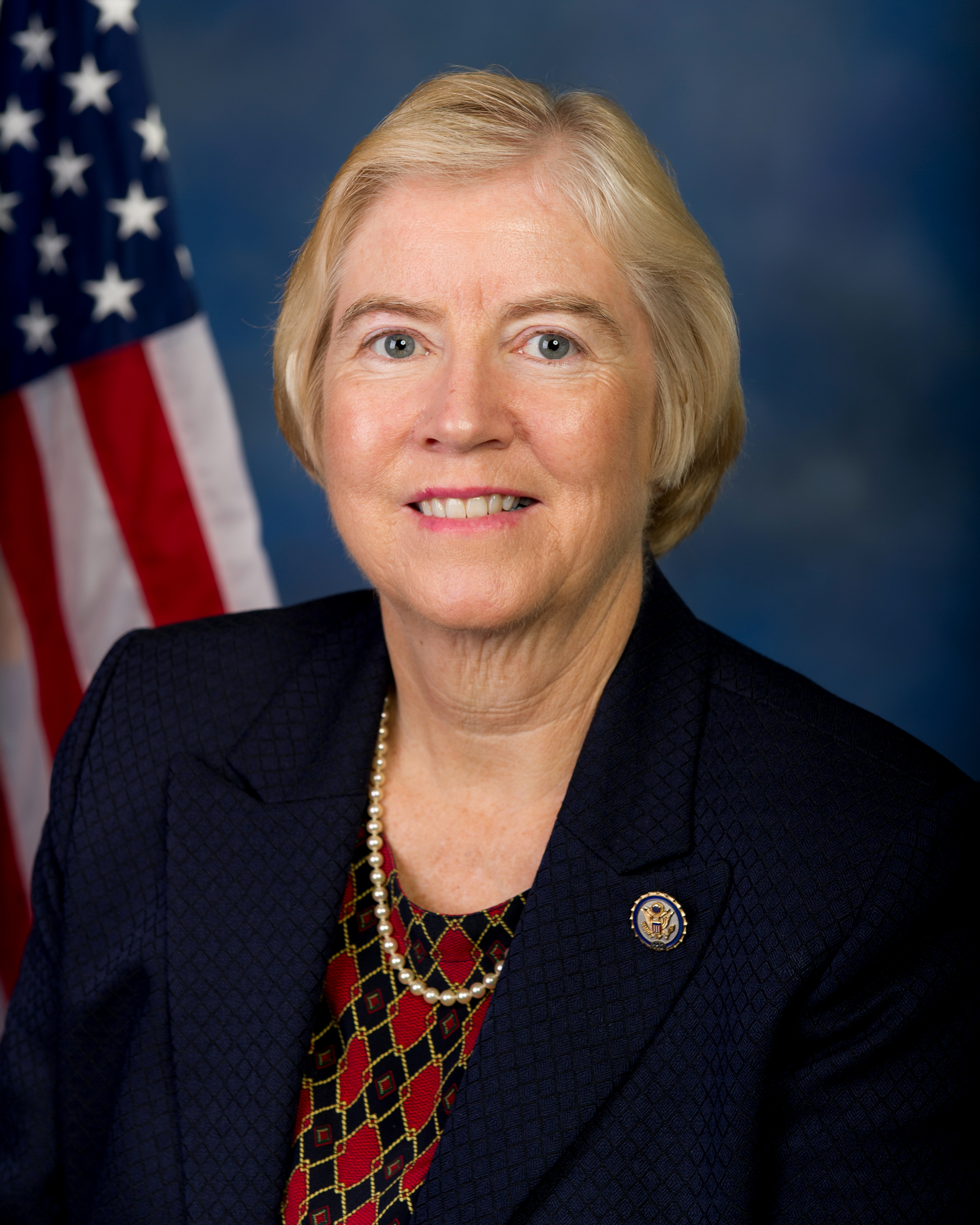

Nominee	Candice Miller	Robert Denison
Party	Republican	Democratic
Popular vote	178,843	84,574
Percentage	66.2%	31.2%
- County results Miller: 60–70% 70–80%
U.S. Representative before election
Candice Miller
Republican
Elected U.S. Representative
incumbent
Republican

Incumbent Republican Candice Miller won re-election to a third term.

=== Predictions ===
Source	Ranking	As of
The Cook Political Report	Safe R	November 6, 2006
Rothenberg	Safe R	November 6, 2006
Sabato's Crystal Ball	Safe R	November 6, 2006
Real Clear Politics	Safe R	November 7, 2006
CQ Politics	Safe R	November 7, 2006

General election results
Party	Candidate	Votes	%
Republican	Candice Miller (incumbent)	178,843	66.2
Democratic	Robert Denison	84,574	31.2
Libertarian	Mark Byrne	2,867	1.1
Green	Candace Caveny	1,895	0.7
Constitution	F Gualdoni	1,894	0.7

== District 11 ==
2006 Michigan's 11th congressional district election
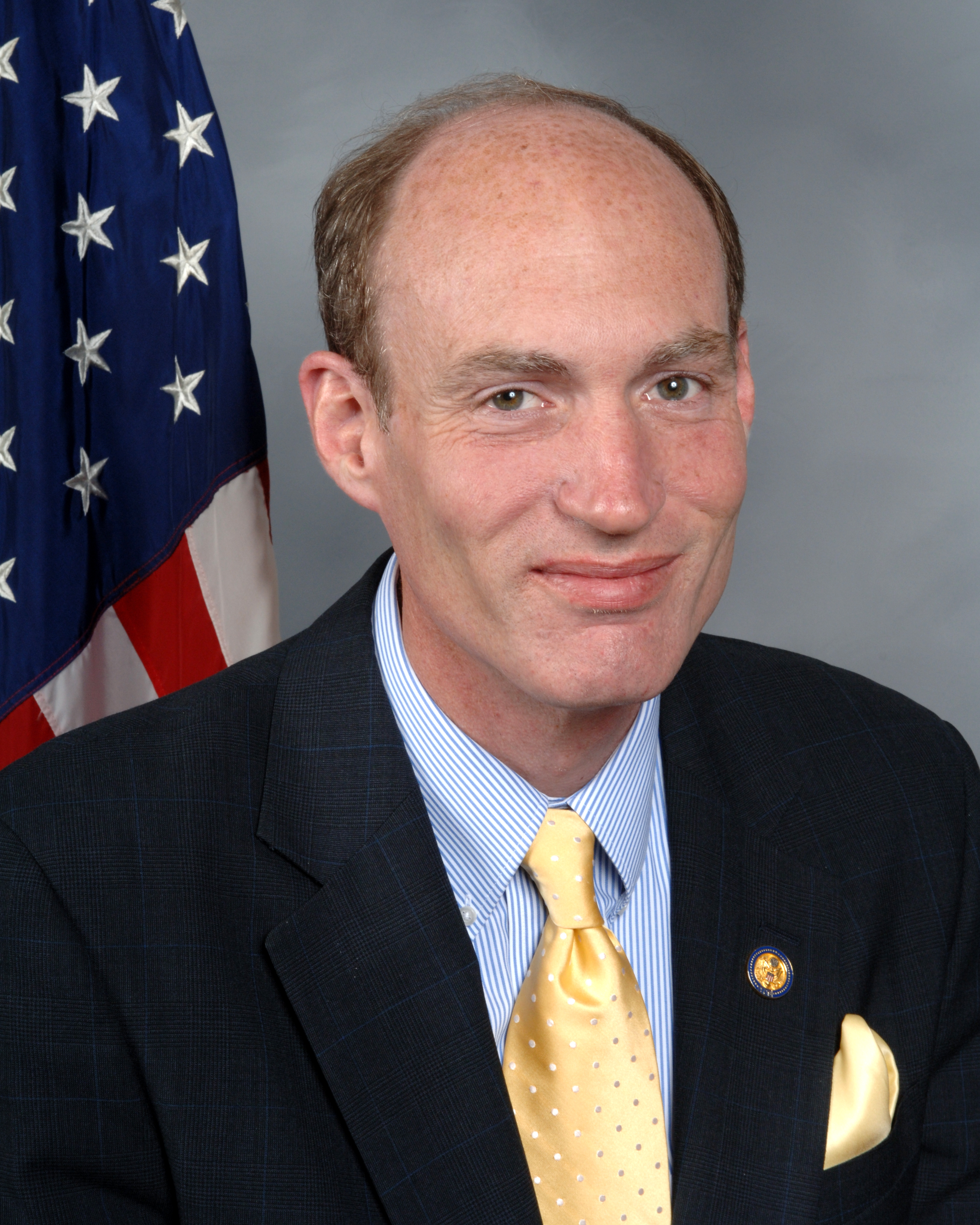

Nominee	Thad McCotter	Tony Trupiano
Party	Republican	Democratic
Popular vote	145,292	115,106
Percentage	54.0%	43.0%
U.S. Representative before election
Thad McCotter
Republican
Elected U.S. Representative
incumbent
Republican

Incumbent Republican Thad McCotter won re-election to a third term.

=== Predictions ===
Source	Ranking	As of
The Cook Political Report	Safe R	November 6, 2006
Rothenberg	Safe R	November 6, 2006
Sabato's Crystal Ball	Safe R	November 6, 2006
Real Clear Politics	Safe R	November 7, 2006
CQ Politics	Safe R	November 7, 2006

General election results
Party	Candidate	Votes	%
Republican	Thad McCotter (incumbent)	145,292	54
Democratic	Tony Trupiano	115,106	43
Libertarian	John Tatar	4,380	2
Constitution	Charles Tackett	3,552	1

== District 12 ==
2006 Michigan's 12th congressional district election
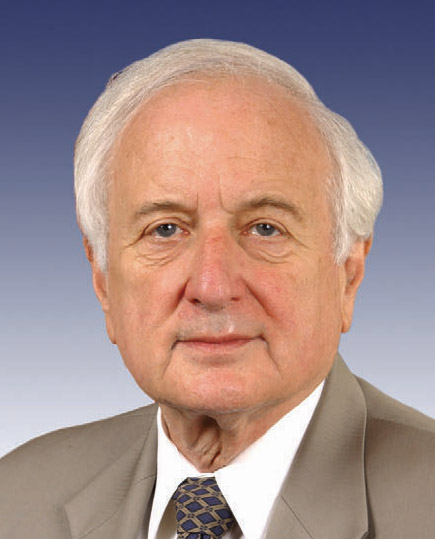

Nominee	Sander Levin	Randall Shafer
Party	Democratic	Republican
Popular vote	168,501	62,688
Percentage	70.0%	26.0%
- County results Levin: 60–70% 80–90%
U.S. Representative before election
Sander Levin
Democratic
Elected U.S. Representative
incumbent
Democratic

Incumbent Democrat Sander Levin won re-election to a thirteenth term.

=== Predictions ===
Source	Ranking	As of
The Cook Political Report	Safe D	November 6, 2006
Rothenberg	Safe D	November 6, 2006
Sabato's Crystal Ball	Safe D	November 6, 2006
Real Clear Politics	Safe D	November 7, 2006
CQ Politics	Safe D	November 7, 2006

General election results
Party	Candidate	Votes	%
Democratic	Sander Levin (incumbent)	168,501	70
Republican	Randall Shafer	62,688	26
Libertarian	Andy Lecureaux	3,259	1
Constitution	Les Townsend	2,076	1
Independent	Jerome White	1,863	1
Green	Art Myatt	1,735	1

== District 13 ==
2006 Michigan's 13th congressional district election
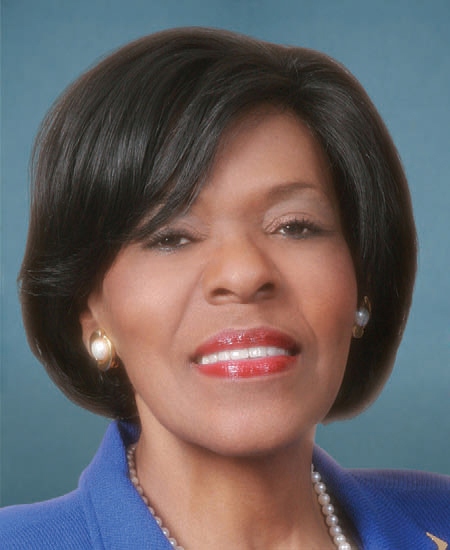
Nominee	Carolyn Cheeks Kilpatrick
Party	Democratic
Popular vote	126,308
Percentage	100.0%
U.S. Representative before election
Carolyn Cheeks Kilpatrick
Democratic
Elected U.S. Representative
Carolyn Cheeks Kilpatrick
Democratic

Incumbent Democrat Carolyn Cheeks Kilpatrick won re-election, unopposed, to a sixth term.

=== Predictions ===
Source	Ranking	As of
The Cook Political Report	Safe D	November 6, 2006
Rothenberg	Safe D	November 6, 2006
Sabato's Crystal Ball	Safe D	November 6, 2006
Real Clear Politics	Safe D	November 7, 2006
CQ Politics	Safe D	November 7, 2006

Results

Michigan's 13th congressional district election, 2006
Party	Candidate	Votes	%
Democratic	Carolyn Cheeks Kilpatrick	126,308	99.99%
Write-in	Write-ins	15	0.01%
Total votes		126,323	100.00%

== District 14 ==
2006 Michigan's 14th congressional district election
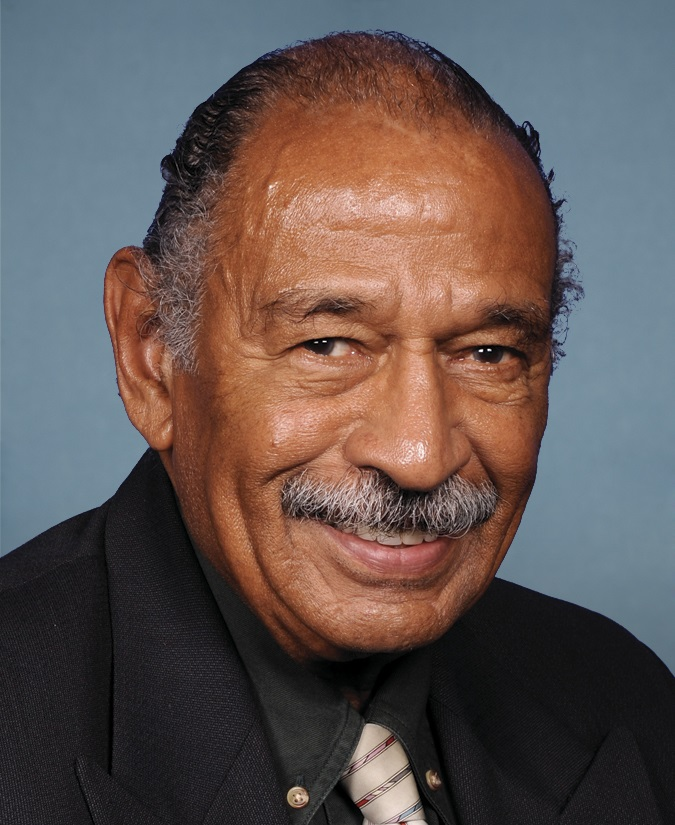

Nominee	John Conyers	Chad Miles
Party	Democratic	Republican
Popular vote	158,755	27,367
Percentage	85.0%	15.3%
- County results Conyers: 80–90%
U.S. Representative before election
John Conyers
Democratic
Elected U.S. Representative
incumbent
Democratic

Incumbent Democrat John Conyers won re-election.

=== Predictions ===
Source	Ranking	As of
The Cook Political Report	Safe D	November 6, 2006
Rothenberg	Safe D	November 6, 2006
Sabato's Crystal Ball	Safe D	November 6, 2006
Real Clear Politics	Safe D	November 7, 2006
CQ Politics	Safe D	November 7, 2006

General election results
Party	Candidate	Votes	%
Democratic	John Conyers (incumbent)	158,755	85
Republican	Chad Miles	27,367	15.34

== District 15 ==
2006 Michigan's 15th congressional district election
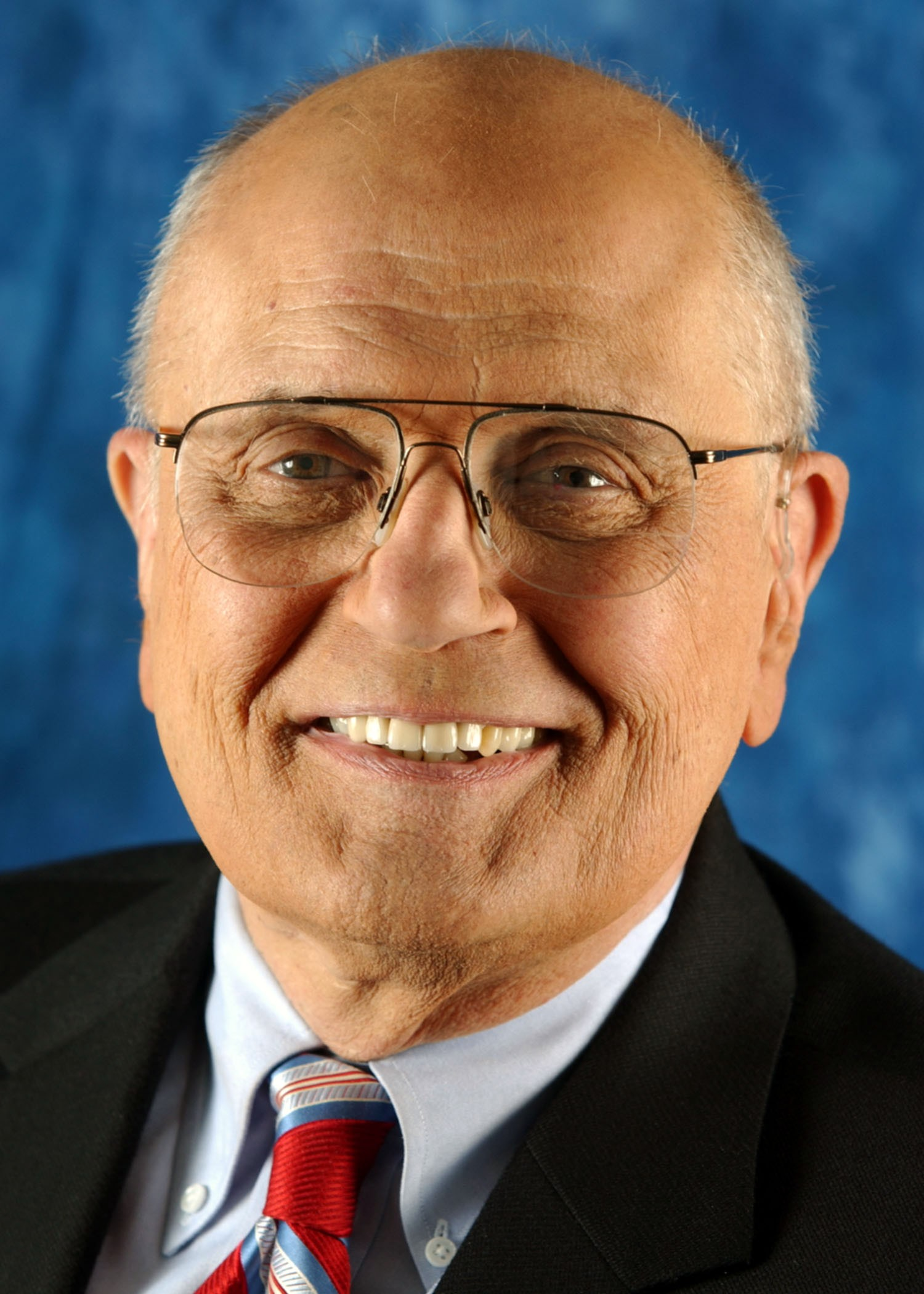

Nominee	John Dingell	Aimee Smith
Party	Democratic	Green
Popular vote	179,401	9,379
Percentage	88.0%	5.0%
U.S. Representative before election
John Dingell
Democratic
Elected U.S. Representative
incumbent
Democratic

Incumbent Democrat John Dingell won re-election to a twenty-seventh term.

=== Predictions ===
Source	Ranking	As of
The Cook Political Report	Safe D	November 6, 2006
Rothenberg	Safe D	November 6, 2006
Sabato's Crystal Ball	Safe D	November 6, 2006
Real Clear Politics	Safe D	November 7, 2006
CQ Politics	Safe D	November 7, 2006

General election results
Party	Candidate	Votes	%
Democratic	John Dingell (incumbent)	179,401	88
Green	Aimee Smith	9,379	5
Libertarian	Greg Stempfle	8,367	4
Constitution	Robert Czak	6,917	3
