= Sweatt =

Sweatt may refer to:

== People ==
- Bill Sweatt (born 1988), American ice hockey player
- George Sweatt (1893–1983), American baseball player
- Heman Marion Sweatt (1912–1982), American civil rights activist
- Joseph S. G. Sweatt (1843–1914), American Civil War soldier
- Lee Sweatt (born 1985), American ice hockey player
- Thomas Sweatt, American serial arsonist
- W. R. Sweatt (1866–1937), American industrialist

== Places ==
- Mount Sweatt, a mountain in Antarctica

== Other ==
- Sweatt v. Painter, U.S. Supreme Court case on racial segregation
