= Acorn Theater =

Acorn Theater may refer to:

- Acorn Theater, Three Oaks, Michigan, created by Kim Clark (candidate)
- Acorn Theatre, on Theatre Row in New York City
