= Energy Tax Prevention Act =

Proposed US legislation

- Long title: Energy Tax Prevention Act of 2011

Codification
- Acts amended: Clean Air Act

Legislative history
- Introduced in the House by Fred Upton (R–MI) on March 3, 2011; Committee consideration by Energy and Commerce; Passed the House on April 7, 2011 (255-172)

United States Supreme Court cases
- Massachusetts v. Environmental Protection Agency

Energy Tax Prevention Act, also known as H.R. 910, was a 2011 bill in the United States House of Representatives to prohibit the United States Environmental Protection Agency (EPA) from regulating greenhouse gases to address climate change. On April 7, 2011, the bill passed the House by a vote of 255 to 172. The bill died in January 2013 with the ending of the Congressional session.

The House vote on the Energy Tax Prevention Act of 2011 was one of five key votes on climate in the House, and one of ten in Congress, from the period 2003 through 2011, according to the Union of Concerned Scientists and the League of Conservation Voters.

== Context ==
In 2003, the United States Environmental Protection Agency (EPA) determined that the EPA lacked authority under the Clean Air Act (CAA) to regulate carbon dioxide and other greenhouse gases to address climate change. Twelve US states as well as US territories, major cities, environmental groups, and others petitioned in federal court to overrule the EPA decision. On April 2, 2007, the Supreme Court of the United States in Massachusetts v. Environmental Protection Agency said the CAA authorized the EPA to regulate greenhouse gases as air pollutants. In December, 2009 the EPA issued its "Endangerment Finding," which found that greenhouse gases threaten health and welfare. In January, 2011 the EPA implemented permitting for sources of greenhouse gases.

On February 9, 2011, in a hearing before the United States House Committee on Energy and Commerce Republican Congressmen said the science underpinning the EPA's regulatory effort was a hoax, questioned the EPA's interpretation of Massachusetts v. Environmental Protection Agency, and said the Obama administration would cost American jobs. EPA Administrator Lisa P. Jackson said cleaning up the environment would improve health and create jobs.

== Proposed changes ==
If passed, this bill would have amended several core components of the Clean Air Act (CAA). Title III of the CAA would have been amended to have the term “greenhouse gas” include: water vapor, carbon dioxide, methane, nitrous oxide, sulfur hexafluoride, hydrofluorocarbons, perfluorocarbons and any other substance subject to, or proposed to be subject to, regulation, action, or consideration under this Act to address climate change.

The Act said that the Administrator of the EPA may take no action involving the consideration of greenhouse gases as pollutants or contributing factors to climate change. It also said that “[nothing] shall cause a greenhouse gas to be subject to part C of title I …or considered an air pollutant for purposes of title V...” This means that, as greenhouse gases would no longer be considered to degrade the quality of air, sources would not be required to obtain a permit to emit. These permits require sources of pollution to complete a registration process in order to lawfully be able to emit anything considered to be a pollutant. Going along with this, it would no longer be required to report emissions of greenhouse gases." The Act also listed a number of prior agency actions that would have been "...repealed and shall have no legal effect." Essentially this Act would have reversed the decision rendered by the Supreme Court of the United States in Massachusetts v. Environmental Protection Agency, which gave the EPA the power to regulate carbon dioxide.

== Legislative history ==
The House bill was sponsored by Representatives Fred Upton (R–6th MI) and Ed Whitfield (R–1st KY). Co-sponsors included Representatives Steve Scalise (R–1st LA), Cathy McMorris Rodgers (R–5th WA), and Greg Walden (R–2nd OR). The bill was introduced on March 3, 2011. An identically worded bill was authored and introduced into the United States Senate by Senator Jim Inhofe (R–OK) and cosponsored by Senators Thad Cochran and Roger Wicker (R–MS) and Marco Rubio (R–FL).

On March 8, 2011, in a hearing before the Subcommittee on Energy of the House Committee on Energy and Commerce, Democratic Congressmen presented five eminent academic climatologists who defended the scientific consensus that global warming is largely the result of human activities like the burning of fossil fuels. Republican Congressmen presented two witnesses who said that the reasons for global warming were unclear. On March 10 the Act advanced out of the subcommittee on a voice vote. On March 15 the Act advanced out of the House Committee on Energy and Commerce on a 34 to 19 vote. All Republican committee members voted in favor, along with three Democrats: John Barrow (D–12th GA), Jim Matheson (D–2nd UT), and Mike Ross (D–4th AR).

On March 30 the Congressional Budget Office (CBO) released a cost estimate that said “enacting this legislation would save $57 million in 2012 and about $250 million over the 2012-2016 period, assuming that appropriations in those years were reduced accordingly.” This savings is calculated by taking into consideration the amount of money spent by the EPA in its effort to regulate GHG emissions. However, “Republicans on the committee's Energy and Power Subcommittee argued that trying to limit carbon emissions would cost US businesses $300-400 billion/year and discourage hiring of new employees.”

In response to this, Lisa P. Jackson, the acting Administrator for the EPA, argued that the EPA's implementation of the Clean Air Act has stimulated the US environmental technologies industry has led to an increase in revenue. "In 2008, that industry generated nearly $300 billion in revenue and $44 billion in exports.” She continued on saying, “Yesterday, the University of Massachusetts and Ceres released an analysis finding that two of the updated CAA standards EPA is preparing to establish … will create nearly 1.5 million jobs over the next 5 years." She also brought attention to the effects that the CAA has on society by stating, "in 2010 alone, EPA's implementation of the CAA saved more than 160,000 US lives, avoided more than 100,000 hospital visits; prevented millions of cases of respiratory illness, including bronchitis and asthma; enhanced US productivity by preventing millions of lost workdays; and kept US children healthy and in school." Supplementing this, on March 1, 2011, the EPA released a report that estimated, “…the direct benefits from the 1990 Clean Air Act Amendments are estimated to reach almost $2 trillion for the year 2020, a figure that dwarfs the direct costs of implementation ($65 billion).” The saving reported here are mainly due to the estimated reduction of early deaths caused by pollution. These findings are based upon already observed trends.

On April 5 US President Barack Obama said he would veto any bill that prevented the EPA from regulating greenhouse gases.

On April 6 in House floor debate Upton summarized his intentions for introducing this bill saying, "The only environmental impact may be to ship our jobs to countries with no environmental protections at all, so, ... at the end of the day the EPA climate regime is all economic pain and no environmental gain." Henry Waxman (D–4th CA), Ranking Member in the House Committee on Energy and Commerce said "...climate change is real. It is caused by pollution, and it is a serious threat to our health and welfare. We need to confront these realities, not put our heads in the sands." On April 7, 2011, the bill passed the House by a vote of 255 to 172. No Republican opposed it; 19 Democrats supported it. The next day it was received by the Senate and referred to the Committee on Environment and Public Works. The bill died with the ending of the two-year Congressional session, in January 2013.
