= Chad Focus =

American singer

- Born: Chad Arrington; Baltimore. Maryland, United States
- Genres: R&B
- Website: chadfocus.com

Chad Arrington, known professionally as Chad Focus, is an American musician.

== Career ==
Arrington took up classical piano lessons at a young age. After graduating from college, he started the record label Focus Music Entertainment.

In August 2017, BET released music video "Get to the Money". He released the single "Dance with Me", which was produced by J. Oliver, featuring and written by Raeliss.

=== Legal issues ===
In June 2019, federal prosecutors announced Arrington had been indicted on charges of conspiracy, wire fraud and aggravated identity theft. They alleged he used his employer-issued credit card to make $4.1 million in unauthorized purchases. Much of that money, prosecutors say, was spent promoting his music venture, including buying likes and shares on social media, inflating his play counts on streaming platforms and paying for billboard space.

In February 2020, Arrington pleaded guilty to conspiracy to commit wire fraud. In May 2021, a federal judge sentenced him to two years and six months in prison. At his sentencing hearing, Arrington claimed amphetamine use and an undiagnosed mental illness helped lead to his offenses.

He was held in the low-security wing of Federal Correctional Complex, Petersburg in Petersburg, Virginia and later transferred to a reentry program. He was released March 21, 2023.

== Discography ==
=== Charted singles ===
Title	Year	Peak chart positions	Album
Title	Year	US Club	Album
"Dance with Me"	2018	35	Non-album single

- Note: As of the week of April 14, 2018, moved up from the debut at number 47 the week of April 7, 2018.
