= North American Energy Infrastructure Act =

- Long title: To require approval for the construction, connection, operation, or maintenance of oil or natural gas pipelines or electric transmission facilities at the national boundary of the United States for the import or export of oil, natural gas, or electricity to or from Canada or Mexico, and for other purposes.
- Announced in: the 113th United States Congress
- Sponsored by: Rep. Fred Upton (R, MI-6)
- Number of co-sponsors: 15

Codification
- Acts affected: Federal Power Act, Natural Gas Act, Public Utility Regulatory Policies Act of 1978, National Environmental Policy Act of 1969
- U.S.C. sections affected: 3 U.S.C. § 301, 16 U.S.C. § 824a, 16 U.S.C. § 824o, 16 U.S.C. § 796, 16 U.S.C. § 824a–4, and others.
- Agencies affected: Federal Energy Regulatory Commission, United States Congress, United States Department of Energy, United States Department of Commerce

Legislative history
- Introduced in the House as H.R. 3301 by Rep. Fred Upton (R, MI-6) on October 22, 2013; Committee consideration by United States House Committee on Energy and Commerce, United States House Committee on Transportation and Infrastructure, United States House Committee on Natural Resources, United States House Energy Subcommittee on Energy and Power, United States House Transportation Subcommittee on Railroads, Pipelines, and Hazardous Materials, United States House Natural Resources Subcommittee on Public Lands and Environmental Regulation; Passed the House on June 24, 2014 (Roll Call Vote 354: 238-173)

The North American Energy Infrastructure Act (H.R. 3301) is a bill that would make changes to permitting requirements for pipelines and other energy infrastructure at international borders. Instead of obtaining a Presidential permit, sponsors of oil pipelines and electric transmission projects that cross international borders would be required to obtain a certificate of crossing from either the United States Secretary of State or the United States Secretary of Energy.

The bill was introduced and passed in the United States House of Representatives during the 113th United States Congress.

== Provisions of the bill ==
This summary is based largely on the summary provided by the Congressional Research Service, a public domain source.

The North American Energy Infrastructure Act would prohibit any person from constructing, connecting, operating, or maintaining an oil or natural gas pipeline or electric transmission facility at the national boundary of the United States for the import or export of oil, natural gas, or electricity to or from Canada or Mexico without obtaining approval under this Act.

The bill would require the United States Secretary of Commerce, with respect to oil pipelines, the Federal Energy Regulatory Commission (FERC), with respect to natural gas pipelines, or the United States Secretary of Energy (DOE), with respect to electric transmission facilities, to approve a request for approval of construction, connection, operation, or maintenance unless it is not in U.S. national security interests.

The bill would declare that such an approval shall not be construed to constitute a major federal action for purposes of environmental review under the National Environmental Policy Act of 1969 (NEPA).

The bill would make conforming amendments to the Natural Gas Act and the Federal Power Act.

== Congressional Budget Office report ==
This summary is based largely on the summary provided by the Congressional Budget Office, as ordered reported by the House Committee on Energy and Commerce on May 8, 2014. This is a public domain source.

H.R. 3301 would make changes to permitting requirements for pipelines and other energy infrastructure at international borders. In particular, the bill would eliminate the existing requirement on sponsors of such infrastructure to obtain a Presidential permit. Instead, H.R. 3301 would require sponsors of oil pipelines and electric transmission projects that cross international borders to obtain a certificate of crossing from either the Secretary of State or the Secretary of Energy. Under H.R. 3301, sponsors of natural gas pipelines would not be required to obtain a certificate of crossing.

The Congressional Budget Office (CBO) estimates that implementing H.R. 3301 would have no significant net effect on the federal budget. Relative to current law, we expect that any changes to administrative costs incurred by agencies responsible for regulating energy infrastructure would not exceed $500,000 in any year, assuming the availability of appropriated funds. Enacting H.R. 3301 would not affect direct spending or revenues; therefore, pay-as-you-go procedures do not apply.

H.R. 3301 contains no intergovernmental or private-sector mandates as defined in the Unfunded Mandates Reform Act and would impose no costs on state, local, or tribal governments.

== Procedural history ==
The North American Energy Infrastructure Act was introduced into the United States House of Representatives on October 22, 2013, by Rep. Fred Upton (R, MI-6). It was referred to the United States House Committee on Energy and Commerce, the United States House Committee on Transportation and Infrastructure, the United States House Committee on Natural Resources, the United States House Energy Subcommittee on Energy and Power, the United States House Transportation Subcommittee on Railroads, Pipelines, and Hazardous Materials, and the United States House Natural Resources Subcommittee on Public Lands and Environmental Regulation. On June 19, 2014, the bill was reported (amended) by the Committee on Energy and Commerce alongside House Report 113-482 part 1. On June 24, 2014, the House voted in Roll Call Vote 354 to pass the bill 238–173.

== Debate and discussion ==
One of the effect of the legislation, if it were to pass, is that it would no longer be the President of the United States' responsibility to approve cross-border pipelines similar to the Keystone Pipeline, but the approval process for the Keystone Pipeline would not be changed.

President Barack Obama released a statement saying that the bill "would impose an unreasonable deadline that would curtail the thorough consideration of the issues involved, which could result in serious security, safety, foreign policy, environmental, economic, and other ramifications." Obama threatened to veto the bill.

The bill's supporters indicated that they were very frustrated with the lengthy, over five years long process that the Obama administration was using to consider the Keystone Pipeline. Energy and Commerce Committee Chairman Fred Upton (R-MI) said that the bill "is a sincere effort to focus a targeted solution to lessons learned from the Keystone pipeline... No one can rightly argue that the current presidential permit process as the State Department is not broken, no matter what side of the climate debate you're on." Upton also argued that "we're creating a fair and transparent approval process for cross-border energy projects, putting them all on a level playing field for the benefit of North American energy security, lower energy prices, and jobs."

The United States Chamber of Commerce released a statement that they "strongly support" the bill because it would "be an important step in reforming this country's broken federal regulatory process, in order to create jobs and strengthen the economy."

== See also ==
- List of bills in the 113th United States Congress
