= Mark D. Siljander =

American politician

Mark Siljander
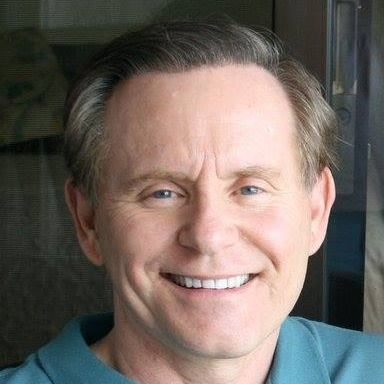

Alternative U.S. Representative to the United Nations General Assembly
- In office 1987–1988
- Appointed by: Ronald Reagan

Member of the U.S. House of Representatives from Michigan's 4th district
- In office April 21, 1981 – January 3, 1987
- Preceded by: David Stockman
- Succeeded by: Fred Upton

Member of the Michigan House of Representatives from the 42nd district
- In office 1977–1981
- Preceded by: DeForrest Strang
- Succeeded by: Harmon G. Cropsey

Personal details
- Born: Mark Deli Siljander; June 11, 1951 (age 75) Chicago, Illinois, U.S.
- Party: Republican
- Education: Western Michigan University (BS, MA)

Mark Deli Siljander (born June 11, 1951) is an American author and politician who served as a Republican U.S. representative from the state of Michigan. He authored the book A Deadly Misunderstanding: A Congressman's Quest to Bridge the Muslim-Christian Divide.

In 2008, Siljander was indicted on charges of money laundering, conspiracy and obstruction of justice. In 2010, he pleaded guilty to obstruction of justice and acting as an unregistered foreign agent. In 2020, President Donald Trump pardoned Siljander.

== Early life, education, and early career ==
Siljander was born in Chicago and graduated from Oak Park and River Forest High School in 1969. He received a Bachelor of Science and Master of Arts from Western Michigan University in Kalamazoo, Michigan.

== Career ==
He served as a trustee on Fabius Township Board in St. Joseph County, Michigan, from 1972 to 1976 and also worked as a real estate broker.

=== U.S. House of Representatives ===
Siljander served as a U.S. Representative from the Michigan's 4th congressional district from April 21, 1981, to January 3, 1987. He served on the House Foreign Affairs Committee. At the time of Siljander's election, Michigan's 4th congressional district covered southwestern Michigan and included Three Rivers and Kalamazoo. Time magazine noted that the district was predominantly conservative, having elected only one Democrat in [the twentieth] century, in 1932.

Siljander was known as a dogmatic social conservative. He criticized President Ronald Reagan's appointment of Sandra Day O'Connor to the Supreme Court, viewing her track record as insufficiently conservative. Time described him as a fundamentalist Christian. During his race, Siljander expressed opposition to the Equal Rights Amendment, pornography, abortion, school busing and "big spending", as well as support for the neutron bomb, the MX missile and prayer in public schools. In Congress, Siljander's voting record was generally consistent with most other Republicans, although he became known for his firebrand conservative rhetoric; for example, he denounced "secular humanists" as having a "perverted" philosophy.

1981

On January 27, 1981, incumbent Congressman David Stockman resigned to serve as the director of the Office of Management and Budget in the Reagan administration. In the following special Republican primary, Siljander ranked first in a seven-candidate field with a plurality of 37%. He defeated Stockman-endorsed tax attorney John Globensky (36%) and State Senator John Mowat (22%). In the April 1981 special general election, he defeated Democratic Cass County Commissioner Johnie Rodebush 69%-29%. In 1981, Congress enacted an amendment, named after Representative Mark Siljander, to the FY1982 Foreign Assistance and Related Programs Appropriations Act specifying that no U.S. funds may be used to lobby for abortion. Congress subsequently modified the amendment to state that funds may not be used to "lobby for or against abortion"

1982

Siljander was challenged in the next Republican primary by attorney Harold Schuitmaker and defeated him 56%-44%. In the general election, he won re-election to a full term with 60% of the vote.

1984

Siljander was challenged again in the Republican primary, and defeated Tim Horan 58%-42%. In the general election, he won re-election to a second full term with 67% of the vote.

In 1984, Siljander sponsored a single-sentence amendment which read, "For the purposes of this Act, the term 'person' shall include unborn children from the moment of conception." Alexander Cockburn referred to the Siljander Amendment as "the most far-reaching of all the measures dreamed up by the conservative right to undercut Roe v. Wade." It failed 186–219.

Siljander travelled with Christian Watch International to Romania in response to the growing concerns over religious minority persecution.

1985

Siljander proposed legislation which would deny most favored nation status to countries that discriminate on cultural, ethnic or religious grounds.

1986

Once again Siljander was challenged in the Republican primary, this time by Fred Upton, a staffer to Stockman. Upton defeated Siljander 55%-45%, becoming the only Republican to unseat an incumbent in a primary that year. A key to his defeat was believed to be a tape sent to fundamentalist Christians in his district asking them to "break the back of Satan" by defeating Upton.

=== Later career ===
Siljander was appointed by President Reagan as an alternate representative to the United Nations General Assembly, serving from September 1987 to September 1988. He was an unsuccessful candidate in 1992 for nomination to the 103rd Congress from Virginia. He stated then his message was, "not religious values as much as it's common-sense American traditional values." He campaigned on a budget freeze, a ten percent flat tax and a line-item veto. In the Republican primary, Siljander came in second to Henry N. Butler, a law professor at George Mason University.

Siljander co-founded the Alliance Defending Freedom (ADF); ADF lawyers later wrote the model for Mississippi's anti-abortion legislation, leading to the Supreme Court decision in Dobbs v. Jackson Women's Health Organization to overrule Roe v. Wade in 2022.

Siljander is the president of Bridges to Common Ground. He also founded Trac5, with the stated goal to implement faith-based diplomacy in real-world conflicts

Siljander's book, A Deadly Misunderstanding: A Congressman's Quest to Bridge the Muslim-Christian Divide was a 2009 Nautilus Silver Award Winner, and has a foreword written by UN Secretary-General Ban Ki-moon, with whom Siljander worked closely to resolve the humanitarian disaster in Darfur.

In Ban Ki-moon's book published in 2021 in a chapter titled "The Breakthrough", Moon recounts Siljander's involvement in resolving the Darfur crisis stating, "...Siljander prayed aloud, passionately for peace in Sudan. That night Siljander convinced President Omar al-Bashir to work closely with the United Nations."

Siljander was featured in the 2019 Netflix miniseries The Family, which details the history and activities of The Fellowship, a secretive Christian organization with ties to politicians and world leaders. In the series, Siljander recounts his efforts to engage Muammar Gaddafi and help bring the Pan Am Flight 103 Lockerbie bombing terror suspects to justice.

In 2020, Pro-life Members of Congress led by Senator Lankford used the Siljander Amendment to Prevent US from Funding Abortions, Abortion Advocacy Abroad.

In 2025, Mark Siljander was featured on the Jordan Peterson podcast which covered topics ranging from Islam, linguistic studies of the Aramaic language of Jesus, and its application in international peacemaking.

=== Criminal conviction and pardon ===
December 2020 pardon granted by Donald Trump

On January 16, 2008, Siljander was indicted in the federal district court in the Western District of Missouri on five counts including money laundering, conspiracy and obstruction of justice. Siljander initially pleaded not guilty, but on July 7, 2010, as part of a plea agreement, Siljander pleaded guilty to obstruction of justice and acting as an unregistered foreign agent. On January 12, 2012, he was sentenced to a year and a day in prison.

The group for which Siljander worked as an unregistered foreign agent was the Islamic American Relief Agency, a Columbus, Missouri-based charity, which hired Siljander in early 2004 to lobby to get IARA removed from a Senate Finance Committee list of charities suspected of funding international terrorism. IARA closed in October 2004 after it was added to the Treasury Department's list of global terrorist organizations.

During Siljander's sentencing, U.S. District Judge Nanette Kay Laughrey stated that: ..."[U]nder the circumstances of this case there was no specific harm by the lobbying efforts that you undertook... The truth is, when you look at this objectively, this is not a case about somebody aiding a terrorist, it just isn't, and it would be wrong of me to, in fact, try to make it out to be that."

In December 2020, President Donald Trump pardoned Siljander, praising his pro-life record while a congressman and his post-prison work abroad. Trump's decision to pardon Siljander was criticized by Republican Congressman Fred Upton, who succeeded Siljander after defeating him in the 1986 Republican primary. His pardon was supported by Edwin Meese, Newt Gingrich, Mike Huckabee, Robert Aderholt, and Andrew Brunson.

U.S. House of Representatives
Preceded by David Stockman	Member of the U.S. House of Representatives from Michigan's 4th congressional district 1981–1987	Succeeded by Fred Upton
U.S. order of precedence (ceremonial)
Preceded by Ed Bethune as Former U.S. Representative	Order of precedence of the United States as Former U.S. Representative	Succeeded by Bill Schuette as Former U.S. Representative
