= Fred Upton =

American politician (born 1953)

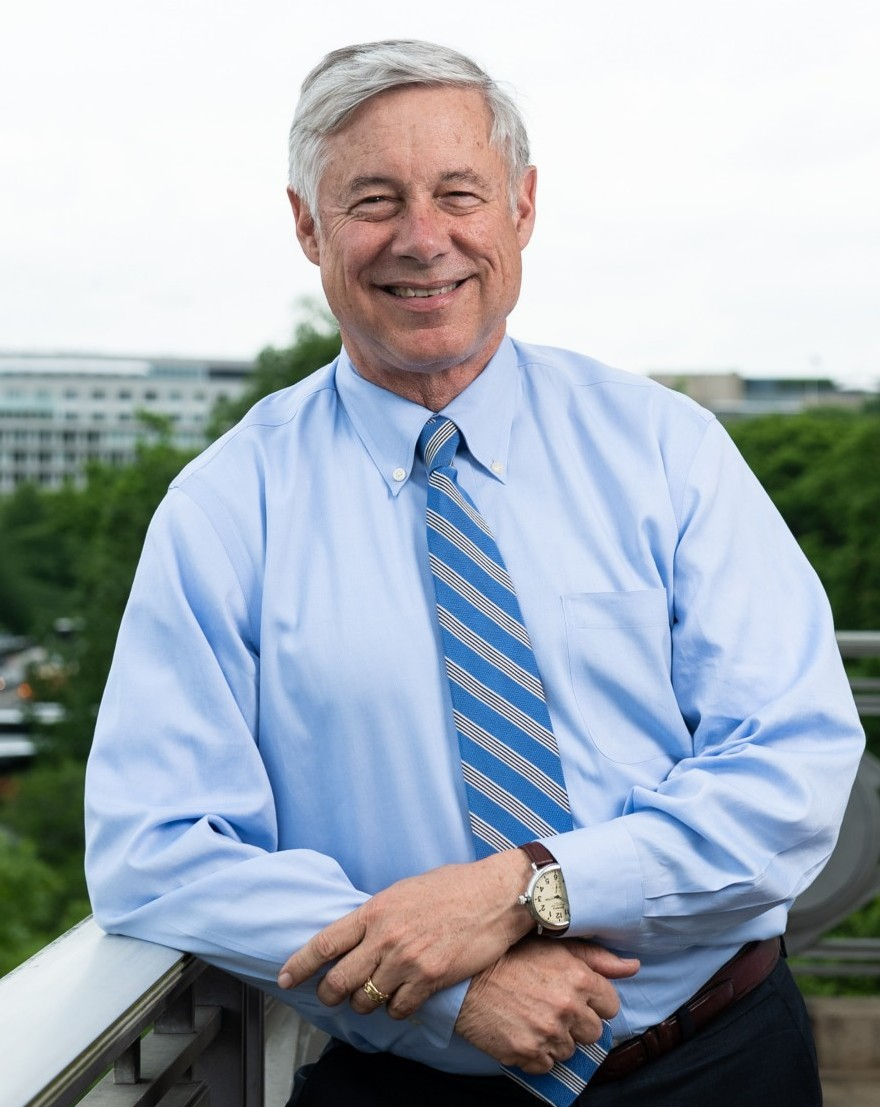
- Official portrait, 2019

Chair of the House Energy and Commerce Committee
- In office January 3, 2011 – January 3, 2017
- Preceded by: Henry Waxman
- Succeeded by: Greg Walden

Member of the U.S. House of Representatives from Michigan
- In office January 3, 1987 – January 3, 2023
- Preceded by: Mark D. Siljander
- Succeeded by: Bill Huizenga (redistricted)
- Constituency: 4th district (1987–1993); 6th district (1993–2023)

Personal details
- Born: Frederick Stephen Upton; April 23, 1953 (age 73) St. Joseph, Michigan, U.S.
- Party: Republican
- Spouse: Amey Rulon-Miller (m. 1983)
- Children: 2
- Relatives: Emory Upton (2x great grand-uncle); Louis Upton (grand-uncle); Kate Upton (niece)
- Education: University of Michigan (BA)
- Upton's voice Upton supporting the STELA Reauthorization Act of 2014. Recorded November 19, 2014

Frederick Stephen Upton (born April 23, 1953) is an American politician who served as a U.S. representative from Michigan from 1987 to 2023. A member of the Republican Party, he represented Kalamazoo and much of southwestern Michigan for 18 terms before retiring in 2023.

A former chairman of the Committee on Energy and Commerce, Upton has played a major role in shaping post-Obamacare health care legislation. He is the only person in American history to vote to impeach two presidents; he voted for the impeachment of Bill Clinton in 1998 and the second impeachment of Donald Trump in 2021, as one of ten Republicans who voted to impeach Trump. After Sander Levin retired at the end of the 115th Congress, Upton became the dean of Michigan's congressional delegation.

== Early life, education, and early political career ==
Upton was born in St. Joseph, Michigan, the son of Elizabeth B. (née Vial) and Stephen Edward Upton (1924–2022). He attended Shattuck-Saint Mary's, graduating in 1971. He earned a B.A. in journalism from the University of Michigan in 1975. He was a member of the Alpha Delta Phi fraternity, Peninsular Chapter, and became a sports editor at The Michigan Daily and thought he might someday cover the Chicago Cubs. He served on the congressional staff of U.S. Representative David Stockman from 1976 to 1980. He was in the Office of Management and Budget (OMB) under Ronald Reagan from 1981 to 1985, while Stockman served as OMB Director.

== U.S. House of Representatives ==
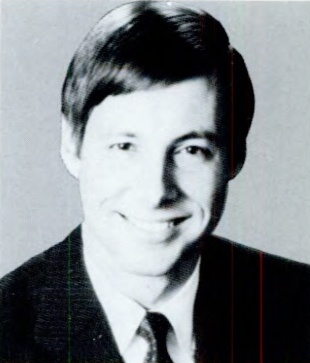
Upton during the 100th Congress

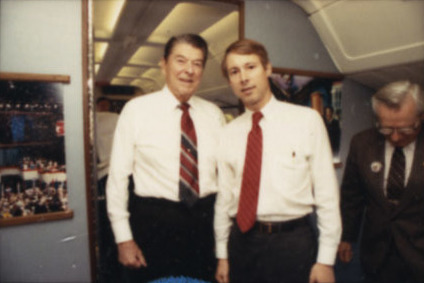
Upton with President Ronald Reagan in 1988

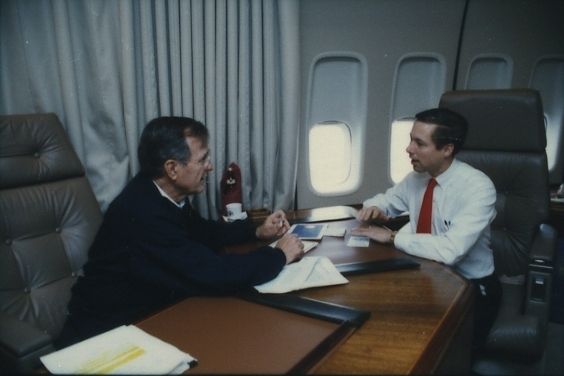
Upton with President George H. W. Bush in 1991

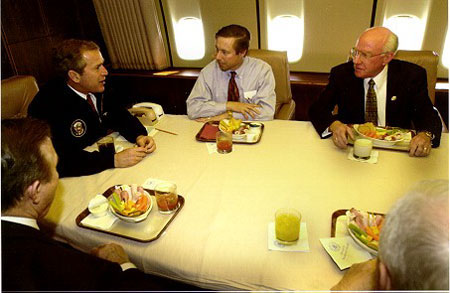
Upton with President George W. Bush in 2001

=== Elections ===
==== 1986 ====
Upton ran in Michigan's 4th congressional district against incumbent Mark Siljander, Stockman's successor. Upton won the Republican primary 55%–45% and the general election with 62% of the vote.

==== 1988 ====
Upton won reelection to a second term with 71% of the vote.

==== 1990 ====
Upton defeated Ed Fredricks in the Republican primary, 63%–37%. In the general election, he was reelected to a third term with 58% of the vote.

==== 1992 ====
After redistricting, Upton's district was renumbered as the 6th district. It absorbed a large slice of the Kalamazoo-based 3rd district, represented by Democrat Howard Wolpe. While Kalamazoo was the largest city in the reconfigured district, it was geographically more Upton's district than Wolpe's, prompting Volpe to retire.

Upton won reelection to a fourth term with 62% of the vote.

==== 2002 ====
After redistricting, Upton faced a primary challenge from State Senator Dale Shugars. Upton defeated Shugars 66%–32%. He won the general election with 69% of the vote.

==== 2004 ====
Upton defeated Democratic nominee Scott Elliott, an art gallery owner, 65%–32%.

==== 2006 ====
Upton defeated Democratic nominee Kim Clark, 61%–38%.

==== 2008 ====
Upton defeated Democratic nominee Don Cooney, a Kalamazoo City Commissioner, 59%–39%.

==== 2010 ====
Upton defeated former State Representative Jack Hoogendyk in the Republican primary, 57%–43%. In the general election, he defeated Cooney, 62%–34%.

==== 2012 ====
In 2011, Hoogendyk met with the Club for Growth, a conservative 501(c)4 organization, about running against Upton again. Upton had been criticized for not being conservative enough by Rush Limbaugh, Glenn Beck, FreedomWorks, Right to Life of Michigan, and the Southwest Michigan Tea Party Patriots. On January 17, 2012, Hoogendyk announced that he would challenge Upton in the primary, the winner of which would face the Democratic nominee, former marine and businessman Mike O'Brien.

Initial polls showed Upton with a sizable lead over O'Brien, but an October poll showed Upton and O'Brien in a dead heat heading into the final stretch of the campaign.

==== 2014 ====
Upton won with 55.9% of the vote, defeating Democrat Paul Clements, Libertarian Erwin Haas, and Green Party candidate John Lawrence.

==== 2016 ====
Upton was reelected, defeating Democratic nominee Paul Clements, a political science professor at Western Michigan University, 58.5%–36.4%.

==== 2018 ====
Upton was reelected with 50.2% of the vote against Democratic nominee Matt Longjohn (45.75%) and U.S. Taxpayers Party candidate Stephen Young (4.1%).

==== 2020 ====
Upton was reelected with 55.9% of the vote against Democratic nominee Jon Hoadley (40.2%), Libertarian Party nominee Jeff Depoy (2.75%), and Green Party candidate John Lawrence (1.2%).

==== 2022 ====
Michigan's congressional map was significantly redrawn after the 2020 census. Upton's district was renumbered as the 4th district, and picked up the remainder of Allegan County that hadn't been in the old 6th, as well as Holland (which Upton had represented for his first three terms) and Battle Creek.

The new territory included the home of fellow Republican Bill Huizenga, who had represented the neighboring 2nd district. Huizenga filed for reelection in the 4th, even though it was geographically more Upton's district. On April 4, 2022, Upton announced on the floor of the House that he would not run for a 19th term.

=== Tenure ===
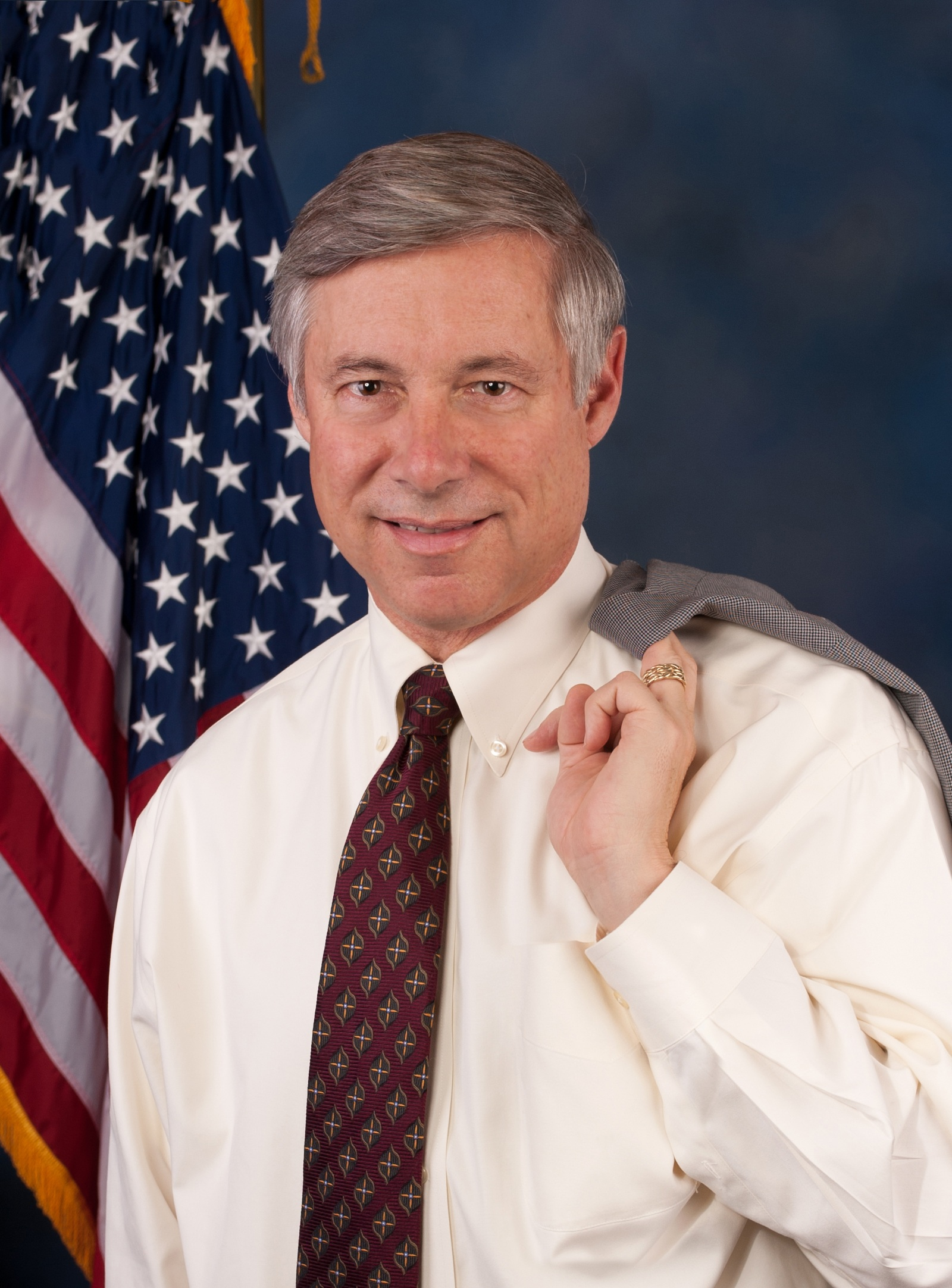
Upton during the 113th Congress

Upton has been a member of moderate Republican factions The Tuesday Group and the Republican Main Street Partnership. On February 4, 2021, he joined 10 other Republican House members voting with all voting Democrats to strip Marjorie Taylor Greene of her House Education and Labor Committee and House Budget Committee assignments in response to controversial political statements she had made.

==== Health care ====
Upton voted against passage of the Affordable Care Act (ACA) and has since voted in favor of its complete repeal. In November 2013, in response to Americans losing their health insurance coverage because of the ACA, Upton proposed a bill that would allow them to retain it. The essence of his bill was to allow insurance companies to maintain their individual insurance market policies according to state insurance rules that were in effect as of 2013. In 2017, Upton played an important role advancing Republican Party efforts to repeal the ACA.

In 2013, Upton introduced a bill that would grant the Food and Drug Administration more power to regulate drug compounding in the wake of the New England Compounding Center meningitis outbreak. In 2016, Obama signed the 21st Century Cures Act into law, a bill Upton co-sponsored. The act establishes funds for biomedical research and to develop and implement a strategic plan for biomedical research. In 2018, Upton and Representative Debbie Dingell worked together on legislation designed to combat opioid addiction. Among other things, it would allocate funding for research into new, non-addictive pain relievers.

==== Environment and energy ====
In 2007 Upton co-sponsored the Energy Independence and Security Act of 2007, which, among other things, mandated phased-in energy efficiency standards for most light bulbs. At the time, he noted that the legislation, ultimately signed into law by President George W. Bush, would "help preserve energy resources and reduce harmful emissions, all while saving American families billions of dollars on their electric bills." Glenn Beck called Upton "all socialist" for supporting the bill.

In April 2009, Upton said that "climate change is a serious problem that necessitates serious solutions. Everything must be on the table." He would later be criticized for moderating his position on carbon emissions, leading a failed effort to stop the Obama administration from enforcing the new energy standards.

Upton's website once stated: "I strongly believe that everything must be on the table as we seek to reduce carbon emissions." In late 2010, he co-authored a Wall Street Journal opinion piece saying he was "not convinced" that "carbon is a problem in need of regulation" and urging Congress to overturn Massachusetts v. Environmental Protection Agency.

Upton and Ed Whitfield co-sponsored H.R. 910, the Energy Tax Prevention Act of 2011. Due to his environmental policies, The Los Angeles Times wrote in 2011 that Upton "represents one of the biggest threats to planet Earth on planet Earth."

In 2012, Upton, as chair of the House Energy and Commerce Committee, said that Congress's refusal to set greenhouse gas limits "constituted a decision and that lawmakers should act now to reverse the EPA emissions rules." Carbon regulation, he said, "threatens to drive energy prices higher, destroy jobs and hamstring our economic recovery."

On October 22, 2013, Upton introduced the North American Energy Infrastructure Act (H.R. 3301; 113th Congress), a bill that would make changes to permitting requirements for pipelines and other energy infrastructure at international borders. He said the bill "is a sincere effort to focus a targeted solution to lessons learned from the Keystone Pipeline... No one can rightly argue that the current presidential permit process as the State Department is not broken, no matter what side of the climate debate you're on." Upton added, "we're creating a fair and transparent approval process for cross-border energy projects, putting them all on a level playing field for the benefit of North American energy security, lower energy prices, and jobs."

As of 2017, Upton has received more than $2 million in campaign donations from oil and gas companies and electric utilities over the course of his political career. In 2018, he joined the Climate Solutions Caucus.

==== Technology and infrastructure ====
Upton introduced legislation to reverse the FCC's ruling on net neutrality in 2015. On November 5, 2021, Upton was one of 13 House Republicans to break with their party and vote with a majority of Democrats in favor of the Infrastructure Investment and Jobs Act.

==== Guns ====
In 2019, Upton supported a bill that requires background checks for private firearm sales. He has called for Congress to pass a bipartisan red flag law.

In March 2021, Upton was one of eight Republicans to join the House majority in passing the Bipartisan Background Checks Act of 2021.

==== LGBT rights ====
In 2004 and 2006, Upton voted for a constitutional amendment banning same-sex marriage. In 2019, he voted against the Equality Act, which would extend existing civil rights legislation to protect LGBT individuals from discrimination.

In 2013, Upton condemned controversial anti-gay remarks by Republican National Committeeman David Agema.

In 2021, Upton was one of 29 Republicans to vote to reauthorize the Violence Against Women Act. This bill expanded legal protections for transgender people, and contained provisions allowing transgender women to use women's shelters and serve time in prisons matching their gender identity.

In 2021, Upton was one of 33 Republicans to vote for the LGBTQ Business Equal Credit Enforcement and Investment Act.

In 2021, Upton co-sponsored the Fairness for All Act, the Republican alternative to the Equality Act. The bill would prohibit discrimination on the basis of sex, sexual orientation, and gender identity, and protect the free exercise of religion.

On July 19, 2022, Upton and 46 other Republican Representatives voted for the Respect for Marriage Act, which would codify the right to same-sex marriage in federal law.

==== Economy ====
In 2019, during the 116th Congress, Upton broke with his party, one of seven Republicans to side with Democrats by voting for legislation that would fund government services and end a shutdown.

In February 2021, Upton voted against a $1.9 trillion COVID relief bill that provided $10 billion in federal aid to Michigan.

==== Donald Trump ====
During Trump's presidency, Upton voted in line with Trump's stated position 78.6% of the time.

In July 2019, Upton was one of four Republican House members to vote in support of a motion to condemn comments Trump made on Twitter calling on four Democratic Congresswomen, three of whom were born in the U.S., to "go back and help fix the totally broken and crime infested places from which they came."

On December 18, 2019, Upton voted against both articles of impeachment against Trump.

On January 12, 2021, Upton announced he would vote to impeach Trump in the pending vote on a second impeachment, claiming Trump incited the January 6 United States Capitol attack, becoming the fourth House Republican to say they would vote to impeach. He ultimately did so alongside nine other Republicans on January 13. On January 21, 2021, the Allegan County Republican Party censured Upton for his vote to impeach Trump. He was later censured by the Cass County Republican Party for voting to remove Marjorie Taylor Greene from the House Education Committee.

On May 19, 2021, Upton was one of 35 Republicans who joined all Democrats in voting to approve legislation to establish the January 6 commission meant to investigate the Capitol attack. Before the vote, he was one of few Republican lawmakers to openly express support for the commission.

In October 2024, Upton endorsed Kamala Harris in the 2024 presidential election, calling Trump "unfit to serve".

==== Iraq ====
In June 2021, Upton was one of 49 House Republicans to vote to repeal the AUMF against Iraq.

==== Steve Bannon ====
On October 21, 2021, Upton was one of nine House Republicans who voted to hold Steve Bannon in contempt of Congress.

==== Immigration ====
Upton supports DACA.

Upton voted for the Further Consolidated Appropriations Act of 2020 which authorizes DHS to nearly double the available H-2B visas for the remainder of FY 2020.

Upton voted for the Consolidated Appropriations Act (H.R. 1158), which effectively prohibits ICE from cooperating with Health and Human Services to detain or remove illegal alien sponsors of unaccompanied alien children (UACs).

==== Abortion ====
Upton was one of three Republicans to vote for H.R. 8297: Ensuring Access to Abortion Act of 2022.

Upton voted for H.R. 8373: The Right to Contraception Act. This bill was designed to protect access to contraceptives and health care providers' ability to provide contraceptives and information related to contraception. The bill would also fund Planned Parenthood.

==== Big Tech ====
In 2022, Upton was one of 39 Republicans to vote for the Merger Filing Fee Modernization Act of 2022, an antitrust package that would crack down on corporations for anti-competitive behavior.

=== Committee assignments ===
- Committee on Energy and Commerce

=== Caucus memberships ===
- Congressional Automotive Caucus (Co-Vice Chair)
- Congressional Competitiveness Caucus
- Congressional Travel and Tourism Caucus
- Diabetes Caucus
- India Caucus
- Indian-Americans Caucus
- United States Congressional International Conservation Caucus
- Sportsmen's Caucus
- Bipartisan Climate Solutions Caucus
- House Baltic Caucus
- Congressional Arts Caucus
- Republican Governance Group
- Problem Solvers Caucus
- Republican Main Street Partnership

== Personal life ==
Upton's grandfather and eponym, Frederick Upton, served as vice-president of appliance manufacturer and marketer Whirlpool Corporation, headquartered in Benton Harbor, which was founded by his great-uncle Louis Upton. He and his wife have two children. Upton's niece is supermodel Kate Upton. Open Secrets reported that Upton had a net worth of $78 million in 2018, making him one of Congress's richest members.

Upton is a supporter of Michigan Wolverines athletics, as well as an enthusiastic Chicago Cubs baseball fan. He is a member of the Emil Verban Society.

Upton is a Congregationalist.

== Electoral history ==
Michigan's 4th congressional district: Results 1986–1990
Year	Republican	Votes	%	Democratic	Votes	%	Third Party	Party	Votes	%
1986	Fred Upton	70,331	62%	Dan Roche	41,624	37%	Richard Gillmor	Independent	1,649	1%
1988	Fred Upton	132,270	71%	Norman Rivers	54,428	29%				
1990	Fred Upton	75,850	58%	JoAnne McFarland	55,449	42%				

Michigan's 6th congressional district: Results 1992–2020
Year	Republican	Votes	%	Democratic	Votes	%	Third Party	Party	Votes	%	Third Party	Party	Votes	%	Third Party	Party	Votes	%
1992	Fred Upton	144,083	62%	Andy Davis	89,020	38%												
1994	Fred Upton	121,932	73%	David Taylor	42,348	26%	E. A. Berker	Natural Law	1,667	1%								
1996	Fred Upton	146,170	68%	Clarence Annen	66,243	31%	Scott Beavers	Libertarian	3,370	2%								
1998	Fred Upton	113,292	70%	Clarence Annen	45,358	28%	Glenn Whitt	Libertarian	1,833	1%	Ken Asmus	Natural Law	1,091	1%				
2000	Fred Upton	159,373	68%	James Bupp	68,532	29%	William Bradley	Libertarian	3,573	2%	Richard Overton	Reform	1,872	1%	C. Dennis James	USTPM	1,290	1%
2002	Fred Upton	126,936	69%	Gary Giguere	53,793	29%	Richard Overton	Reform	2,788	2%								
2004	Fred Upton	197,425	65%	Scott Elliott	97,978	32%	Randall MacPhee	Green	2,311	1%	Erwin Haas	Libertarian	2,275	1%	W. Dennis FitzSimons	USTPM	2,169	1%
2006	Fred Upton	142,125	61%	Kim Clark	88,978	38%	Kenneth Howe	Libertarian	3,480	1%								
2008	Fred Upton	188,157	59%	Don Cooney	123,257	39%	Greg Merle	Libertarian	4,720	1%	Edward Pinkney	Green	3,512	1%				
2010	Fred Upton	123,142	62%	Don Cooney	66,729	34%	Melvin Valkner	USTPM	3,672	2%	Fred Strand	Libertarian	3,369	2%	Pat Foster	Green	1,784	1%
2012	Fred Upton	174,955	55%	Mike O'Brien	136,563	43%	Christie Gelineau	Libertarian	6,366	2%	Jason Gatties	USTPM	2,591	1%				
2014	Fred Upton	116,801	56%	Paul Clements	84,391	40%	Erwin Haas	Libertarian	5,530	3%	John Lawrence	Green	2,254	1%				
2016	Fred Upton	193,246	58%	Paul Clements	119,975	36%	Lorence Wenke	Libertarian	16,249	5%								
2018	Fred Upton	147,436	50%	Matt Longjohn	134,082	46%	Stephen J. Young	USTPM	11,920	4%								
2020	Fred Upton	211,496	56%	Jon Hoadley	152,085	40%	Jeff Depoy	Libertarian	10,399	3%	John Lawrence	Green	4,440	1%				

== See also ==
U.S. House of Representatives
Preceded by Mark Siljander	Member of the U.S. House of Representatives from Michigan's 4th congressional district 1987–1993	Succeeded by Dave Camp
Preceded by Bob Carr	Member of the U.S. House of Representatives from Michigan's 6th congressional district 1993–2023	Succeeded by Debbie Dingell
Preceded by Henry Waxman	Chair of the House Energy and Commerce Committee; 2011–2017	Succeeded by Greg Walden
Party political offices
New office	Chair of the Tuesday Group; 1995–2005; Served alongside: Mike Castle, Nancy Johnson	Succeeded by Charles Bass; Mark Kirk
Preceded by John Katko; Elise Stefanik	Chair of the Republican Governance Group; Tuesday Group: 2019–2020; 2019–2021; Served alongside: Susan Brooks, John Katko	Succeeded by John Katko
U.S. order of precedence (ceremonial)
Preceded by Sander Levin as Former U.S. Representative	Order of precedence of the United States as Former U.S. Representative	Succeeded by Peter DeFazio as Former U.S. Representative
