= Sabri Benkahla =

American criminal

- Born: Virginia, U.S.
- Education: George Mason University; Johns Hopkins University
- Occupations: Muslim theologian and lecturer of Islamic Studies
- Criminal charges: 1 count of charges of obstruction of justice 1 count of making a false statement to agents of the Federal Bureau of Investigation
- Penalty: 10 years

Sabri Benkahla is an American Muslim theologian and lecturer of Islamic Studies. He was convicted on February 5, 2007, of two counts before a grand jury. The first count was for obstruction of justice and the second for making a false statement to agents of the Federal Bureau of Investigation (FBI). This conviction qualified for sentencing enhancement pursuant to 3A1.4, Application Note 2. The sentence he received was 10 years.

== Early life and education ==
Benkahla was born in Virginia, and is a United States citizen of Arab descent. He attended a Catholic elementary school in Falls Church, Virginia, and a public high school in Fairfax County, Virginia. He graduated from the George Mason University in Fairfax County with honors in international relations and comparative religion. After graduating from George Mason University, he studied Arabic and Islamic sciences in Cairo, Egypt, Damascus, Syria, and Amman, Jordan. Benkahla also obtained an M.A. from Johns Hopkins University in Baltimore, and Islamic Law and Jurisprudence at the Medina University.

== Case history ==
In the summer of 1999, he was accused of traveling to England and then buying tickets to Pakistan. It was said that he crossed the Af-Pak border into the Islamic Emirate of Afghanistan to train in a Lashkar-e-Tayba (LeT) training camp. It was said it was there that he learned to fire a Kalashnikov assault rifle (AK47 or AKM) and rocket propelled grenade launcher (RPG). He was charged with, "supplying services to the Taliban and using a firearm in furtherance of a crime of violence".

=== Arrest ===
In 2003, Benkahla was seized in Saudi Arabia. His detention was associated with Ahmed Omar Abu Ali. Benkahla had completed the Islamic law curriculum and was set to graduate from Medina University. He was also taken on the night before his wedding. He was, "arrested, blindfolded, handcuffed, shackled and held in horrific conditions at behest of the FBI" and held, "incommunicado in 8 x 8 foot concrete cell while his dumbfounded family wondered why he failed to appear at his own wedding". He was then rendered back to the US by agents from the FBI while, "forced to wear opaque goggles with duct tape, shackled in a painful position, and left in a sealed pod for approximately seventeen hours".

=== Indictment ===
In June 2003, Benkahla was indicted with ten others as part of the Virginia paintball trials. These investigations accused Ali Al-Timimi of encouraging a number of people including Benkahla to go to Pakistan and join the Taliban. The group were said to have used paintball as a form of military training. Many of them were arrested and accused of supporting the Taliban or training with LeT in Pakistan.

=== Charge ===
In September 2003, Benkahla was charged with supplying services to the Taliban and using a firearm in furtherance of that offence. There was a motion to sever the case from that of the other co-defendants which was successful.

On April 4, 2005, Al-Timimi was charged with aiding, inciting, and abetting 'the terrorist network' and received 70 years without a chance for parole.

In March 2004, Benkahla went on a one-day bench trial. He was acquitted by Judge Leonie M. Brinkema, who said, "The uncontested evidence again is the defendant had been held under conditions which would not be acceptable for a United States-based defendant...". He also called his arrest and transfer to American authorities "a Kafkaesque situation".

There was a lack of evidence to show he had trained in Afghanistan or helped the Taliban.

In August and November 2004, Benkahla was subpoenaed to speak before a grand jury. Agents from the FBI were still investigating who had gone to the training camps and also military people connected to Dar al-Aqam. The FBI had also thought that Benkahla had attended the camps without checking if this is true, which meant, "over the next few months, the government compelled Benkahla to testify before each of the grand juries and to meet with the FBI several times in ancillary proceedings, with immunity from criminal prosecution for truthful testimony" about him being part of military training camps and fighting in Afghanistan and Pakistan in 1999. He was also asked about the people he knew who had also gone to the military training camps, including those from Dar Al-Arqam, "global terrorists' and people the officials from the US government think are helping Al-Qaeda. Many of the people who were connected to Dar Al-Arqam were said to have gone to military camps. It was also said that Benkahla had told the grand jury incorrect information about the people he met on the said 1999 trip to a LeT camp.

=== Perjury ===
On February 9, 2006, an indictment was filed against Benkahla on two counts. The first was for perjury, contending that, on August 26, he "unlawfully and knowingly made a false declaration", but what actually happened was not made clear; and that he had said that he did not see anyone in Pakistan firing any weapons, he never fired an AK-47 or used an RPG, he was not sure he was going to Pakistan when he left London and that he only decided to go because an Abdella in London said he would show him around Pakistan.

The second count was for obstruction of justice because the prosecution people said that between August and November 2004 Benkahla, "unlawfully, willfully, and knowingly did corruptly influence, obstruct and impede, and endeavor to corruptly influence, obstruct and impede the due administration of justice by knowingly and wilfully testifying falsely and evasively" at two grand juries; that what he said, "obstructed and impeded the grand jury's ability to ascertain who had participated in a jihad training camp or combat... the grand jury's ability to ascertain who had helped arrange Benkhala's participation..." and that agents from the FBI asked Benkahla about Ibrahim Buisir and Manaf Kasmuri, who have been put on a list of "Specially Designated Global Terrorists", Ahmed Abu Ali, his friend at Medina University, and someone the FBI agents thought was Malik al-Tunisi. There was an attempt made to get the charges thrown out on collateral estoppel reasons. Evan Kohlman and others were also brought to talk in court.

=== Raid ===
A week before Sabri's case agents from the FBI raided his father's medicine business, put his brother behind bars and sister in hospital.

=== Trial ===
From January to February 2007 the perjury case went to trial.

==== Enhanced sentencing ====
At sentencing, people from the U.S. government said that Benkahla should get his sentenced boosted up enhanced sentencing. From the district court a case can only be for 'enhanced sentencing' if it (1) "seeks specific information regarding terrorism offenses" and meets motivational requirement (Book 64); (2) must show actual obstruction of investigation. The district court then said that Benkahla's case meets these rules in these books specifically on page 75.

This increased Benkahla's offence level from 26 to 32 and put him in the criminal history category for I to VI. But officials in the court granted downward departure of sentencing and so reduced it to 121 months, from the original which was between 210–262 months. There was an even a letter given in by Congressman Moran supporting Benkahla. Benkahla told the judge that "I'm shocked at what has happened and feel betrayed" by the rulings that led to such a stiff sentence. "They still felt they had to get Mr. Benkahla in some way, and this was the way to do it," attorney John Keats said.

==== Appeal ====
On April 11, 2008, Benkahla appealed. He put forward for the Fourth Circuit to consider whether the:

1. second prosecution violated Double Jeopardy clause of 5th Amendment
2. court "admitted irrelevant or unduly prejudicial evidence regarding radical Islamic terrorism"
3. application of Section 3A1.4 violated Sixth Amendment
4. court really had sufficient evidence to corroborate Benkahla's admissions and support the verdict

And on June 23, 2008, his appeal was decided and he lost on all counts.

=== Terre Haute ===
Benkahla was taken to communications management unit (CMU) in Terre Haute, Indiana. In June 2010, the American Civil Liberties Union (ACLU) decided that they will fight Benkahla's being in the CMU.

== Notable elements of case ==
Below are a number of points that make the case interesting.

=== Procedural improprieties ===
==== Double jeopardy ====
As shown by the defence in the Court of Appeals Benkahla was put in double jeopardy, and left the question whether the second trial broke the principle of collateral estoppel. For example, if Benkahla was found not guilty of going to military camps in the Islamic Emirate of Afghanistan, how could it have been said that he denied attending these camps? There was no new evidence that came out after the first trial. And so he had not been found guilty in the first trial on the same evidence that was used to try to get him in the second.

==== Prejudicial evidence ====
The trail brought in 'evidence' that was not balanced and not concerning Benkahla's case. This was what Evan Kohlmann brought. He talked about radical Islam and jihad in a wide way and also spoke about the Taliban, "Benkahla takes special note of a passage in which Kohlmann remarked that, for Osama bin Laden and al Qaeda, "Americans, no matter where they are on earth, whether they're civilian or military, are considered to be a target. There are no innocent civilians."". There was also the testimony of Sarah Linden, an FBI agent. Linden's testimony included video, photographs and a taped confession of Abu Ali. And on top of there were things said about the September 11 attacks, Osama bin Laden, and terrorist activities. It got so bad that,

"The Judge himself had to reprimand the prosecutors on several occasions for overstepping the very loose boundaries he set. The tactics used by the prosecution were effective in confusing and scaring the jury into a guilty verdict."

There was evidences which was not allowed in one place but allowed in another. And example of this being that Benkahla not being found guilty in the first place was not allowed but people from the prosecution were allowed to bring the evidence used in that previous case which did not give the jury the whole picture.

==== Appeal ====
Benkahla was resentenced on appeal to 10 years:

"United States v. Benkahla: Illustrating the Need for Reform – the Fourth Circuit's Unprecedented Application of the United States Sentencing Guideline Terrorism Enhancement to an Obstruction of Justice Conviction" was "overzealous use of Section 3A1.4, Note 2 in Benkahla indicates that the United States Sentencing Commission needs to reevaluate the obstruction of justice terrorism enhancement." because it "makes it much, much easier for government to prove that obstruction of justice convictions justify use of terrorism enhancement: in other words, "defendants who are not convicted of crimes that directly involve terrorism and are unaware that their testimony is obstructing a terrorism investigation can receive a sentence of up to 262 months of imprisonment". In sum, "The district court even declared that ― Sabri Benkahla is not a terrorist... Thus, applying the terrorism enhancement to make Benkahla's sentence eighty months longer than the maximum sentence for a non-terrorism-related obstruction of justice conviction violates principles of fundamental fairness and sharply contradicts the intent of the Guidelines, which were designed to promote uniformity and proportionality in sentencing" and upheld in the District court's statement:

"Sabri Benkahla is not a terrorist. He does not have the same characteristics of a terrorist, and share the same characteristics or the conduct of a terrorist and in turn does not share the same likelihood of recidivism, the difficulty of rehabilitation, or the need of incapacitation…Defendant has not committed any other criminal acts and there is no reason to believe he would ever commit another crime after his release from his imprisonment. Defendant has engaged in model citizenry, receiving a Master's Degree from Johns Hopkins University, volunteering as a national elections officer in local, state, and national elections. It is clear that, in the case of the instant defendant, his likelihood of ever committing another crime is infinitesimal…In fact the court received more letters on Sabri's behalf than any other defendant in twenty five years, all attesting to his honor, integrity, moral character, opposition to extremism, and devotion to civic duty."

== Prison conditions ==
Benkahla is in an isolation unit even though he has been classified as a minimum security prisoner. In June 2010 the ACLU and their Indiana branch filed a complaint challenging his confinement in (CMU) Terre Haute. The conditions he is suffering are:

- No contact with any visitors
- Limited visits: Prisoners in CMU only allowed 2 visits each month of 2 hours each
- Limited phone calls: "only one 15 minute non-legal call per week to a single line"
- Segregation: no contact with non CMU prisoners etc.

== See also ==
- List of Muslim theologians
