= Thomas Sweatt =

American serial arsonist

Thomas Anthony Sweatt is a convicted serial arsonist. He set over 350 fires in and around Washington, D.C. most of which occurred in 2003 and 2004, making him one of the most prolific serial arsonists in American history. Following his arrest in April 2005, Sweatt admitted to setting fires for more than 30 years. As of May 2023, he was serving his sentence at the Federal Correctional Institution Petersburg Medium in Hopewell, Virginia. Two of his fires killed two elderly women, Annie Brown in 2002 and Lou Edna Jones in 2003, while a third, set in 1985, killed a man named Roy Picott and his wife, Bessie Mae Duncan.

== Arsons ==
Starting in 2003, Washington, D.C. and Prince George's County, Maryland became the scene of a series of arson fires. Sweatt was a fry cook and later the manager of a Washington fast food restaurant. He was linked to the fires through DNA evidence found at two scenes where skin cells on marine pants, some skin cells on a wick and a single hair all matched his genetic profile. Sweatt was captured after a Marine Corps security camera identified his vehicle at the scene of a car fire by a barrack. Sweatt was obsessed with the Marines, both as self-identification and as part of a sexual fascination with men in uniform. He had been rejected by the United States Navy in the 1970s. In his guilty plea, Sweatt confessed to nearly 400 fires, several of them fatal.

== Arrest and charges ==
On August 4, 2005, two fatal arson cases in the District of Columbia were closed with the arrest of 50-year-old Thomas Sweatt of the 500 blocks in Lebaum Street SE. He was formally charged in both cases with second-degree murder while armed.

The first offense occurred at approximately 4:05 am on February 5, 2002. Members of the Fifth District received a radio assignment for a house fire at 1208 Montello Avenue NE. Once on the scene, officers located 93-year-old Annie Brown of the Montello Avenue address. DC Fire and Emergency Medical Services personnel responded to the scene and transported the victim to the George Washington University Hospital, where she was admitted in serious condition. On February 14, 2002, Brown was pronounced dead. An autopsy performed by the DC Office of the Chief Medical Examiner determined the cause of death to be smoke inhalation and the manner of death to be a homicide.

The second incident occurred at approximately 4:30 am on June 5, 2003. DC Fire and EMS personnel responded to 2800 Evarts Street NE for the report of a house fire. Upon extinguishing the blaze on the first floor of the residence, firefighters located 85-year-old Lou Edna Jones of the Evarts Street address inside. She was transported to the Washington Hospital Center's MedSTAR Unit, where she was pronounced dead.

The story of Sweatt and his capture was featured on truTV and Investigation Discovery Channels and as part of the Forensic Files series. During the Forensic Files episode, it was said that Sweatt revealed the motive for his crimes to the police but, in exchange for his confession, he asked that the motive remained secret. The only things that were revealed in the episode were that he set the fires to silence "voices" that he heard and to "relieve stress".

== Guilty plea and sentencing ==
Sweatt pleaded guilty before U.S. District Court Judge Deborah K. Chasanow to various counts: possession of destructive devices; destruction of buildings by fire resulting in personal injury; possession of destructive devices in furtherance of a crime of violence; and in the criminal information originally filed in the District of Columbia, first-degree premeditated murder (felony murder) and second-degree murder, resulting in a mandatory life sentence before the same judge on September 12, 2005.

== Later admission ==
On January 11, 1985, Sweatt finished his late shift as a cook and followed a male stranger in his 30s to his house. Wanting to see the stranger again, Sweatt went home and returned to his house with a two-liter soda bottle filled with gasoline. From the front porch of the stranger's house, he poured the gasoline under the front door and lit it. On the second floor of the house, the stranger (Roy Picott), his wife (Bessie Mae Duncan), daughter, and stepdaughter were all sleeping. His son and stepson were asleep in the basement and were unharmed. The others suffered severe burn injuries; Bessie Mae Duncan died at the scene and Picott died from his injuries two months later. The official fire report at the time mistakenly blamed a dropped cigarette for the reason the fire started.

Investigators closed 353 cases with Sweatt's confession.

== See also ==
- List of serial killers in the United States
