= Islamic American Relief Agency =

American non-profit organization (established 1985)

The Islamic American Relief Agency (IARA-USA) was an "American non-profit organization established in 1985 and dedicated to the empowerment of disadvantaged people everywhere through relief and participatory development programs emphasizing human dignity, self-reliance, and social justice." It has been under scrutiny by the FBI and Joint Terrorism Task Force since October 2004, when its offices were raided and its operations shut down.

On March 8, 2007, the organization and five of its leaders were charged in the 33-count indictment, handed down by a grand jury in U.S. District Court for the Western District of Missouri for sending $1.4 million to Iraq during the sanctions that took place from 1990 to 2003.

== Early history ==
IARA-USA was founded in Columbia, Missouri, by a group of concerned Sudanese residents in the United States as a response to the humanitarian emergency in Sudan and other parts of Africa. As the time went on, the organization has helped many people in many parts of the world, including the Middle East, Southeast Asia, and the United States. Although they were all Muslims, they served to help the needy around the world, no matter what nationality their recipients may be.

== Orphan sponsorship ==
Of all its programs, IARA-USA was very successful in its Orphan Sponsorship program, where donors could sponsor an orphan in another country for $1 per day. This amount provided food, clothing, medical care, education, and other necessities to the orphan in the time he/she was sponsored. Every sponsor received a photo and biographical information for each child he/she sponsored. The IARA-USA Orphan Sponsorship program served orphans in Afghanistan, Albania, Azerbaijan, Bangladesh, Chad, Ethiopia, Jordan, Kenya, Lebanon, Mali, Pakistan, Somalia, Uganda, and Yemen.

== Health clinics ==
IARA-USA was also concerned with poor health care in areas of conflicts around the world. They addressed the need for adequate health care (particularly for children and pregnant women) by providing primary health care, immunizations, nutrition counseling, and supplementation, prenatal care, infectious disease prevention, and sanitary water supplies. IARA-USA also helped to establish medical and therapeutic facilities for rape victims, and to train medical personnel at those facilities. These projects have been especially strong in Mali, Bangladesh, Somalia, and the Balkans.

== Education and training facilities ==
Education and vocational training was a vital part of all IARA-USA’s development initiatives. It sponsored educational projects supporting elementary and secondary schools as well as community education services. Many of IARA-USA’s development projects involved vocational training in sewing, welding, carpentry, and other areas. Health education programs were implemented in coordination with their medical projects.

=== Djindjini-Koire Community School in Mali ===
The Djindjini-Koire Community School in Mali served 123 boys and 92 girls. It was built as part of IARA-USA’s Community Education, Water, and Income Generation Project, under which a number of similar educational initiatives were being implemented. These efforts included helping local people to organize their own educational systems, train their own teachers, and construct more schools. The goal of the project was to establish a self-sufficient, quality educational infrastructure in the Circle of Timbuktu through the active participation of the local communities.

=== Anwar Educational Center in Bosnia ===
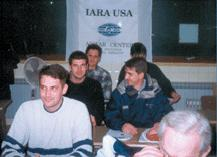
Anwar Educational Center in Bosnia

The Anwar Educational Center in Bosnia was established in 1996 to address the post-war recovery needs of the inhabitants of Bosnia, especially the young women and demobilized soldiers. The Anwar Center provided computer and language training, the purpose of which was to help the target groups overcome the economic and social difficulties arising from the war by helping them get jobs and attain economic self-sufficiency and a sense of personal confidence.

== Treasury designation and criminal prosecution ==
In October 2004, the Treasury Department's Office of Foreign Assets Control designated the Sudan-based Islamic African Relief Agency and five of its senior officials as “Specially Designated Global Terrorists” for supporting Osama bin Laden, al-Qaeda, and the Taliban.

In March 2007, the Department of Justice charged IARA-US, along with five officers, employees and associates, in a 33-count indictment for illegally transferring funds to Iraq in violation of federal sanctions. In January 2008, the Department of Justice brought a superseding indictment with additional charges against IARA-US and its officers, along with new charges against Mark Deli Siljander, a former U.S. Representative from Michigan, for money laundering, conspiracy, and obstruction of justice.

On April 6, 2010, Ali Mohamed Bagegni, a member of IARA-US's board of directors, pleaded guilty to conspiring to violate federal law prohibiting the transfer of money to Iraq. On June 25, Mubarak Hamed, IARA-US's executive director, pleaded guilty to conspiring to illegally transfer more than $1 million to Iraq in violation of federal sanctions, and to obstructing the administration of the laws governing tax-exempt charities. On July 7, Siljander pleaded guilty to obstruction of justice and acting as an unregistered foreign agent, and Abdel Azim El-Siddig, formerly a part-time fundraiser for IARA-US, pleaded guilty to conspiring to hire Siljander to lobby for IARA-US's removal from the U.S. Senate Finance Committee's list of organizations supporting terrorism. Judge Nanette Laughery noted that the defendants had not been accused of supporting terrorist organizations or threatening the U.S. The cases were brought by Anthony Gonzalez and Steven Mohlhenrich from the U.S. Attorney’s Office for the Western District of Missouri, and Paul Casey and Joseph Moreno from the National Security Division of the Department of Justice.

On July 20, 2016, IARA-US itself pleaded guilty to transferring nearly $1.4 million to Iraq in violation of federal sanctions. As a condition of its plea, IARA-US agreed dissolve itself as a corporation for all time, and its board of directors agreed that it would not form a new corporation to conduct the activities that IARA-US formerly conducted.
