= Joseph S. G. Sweatt =

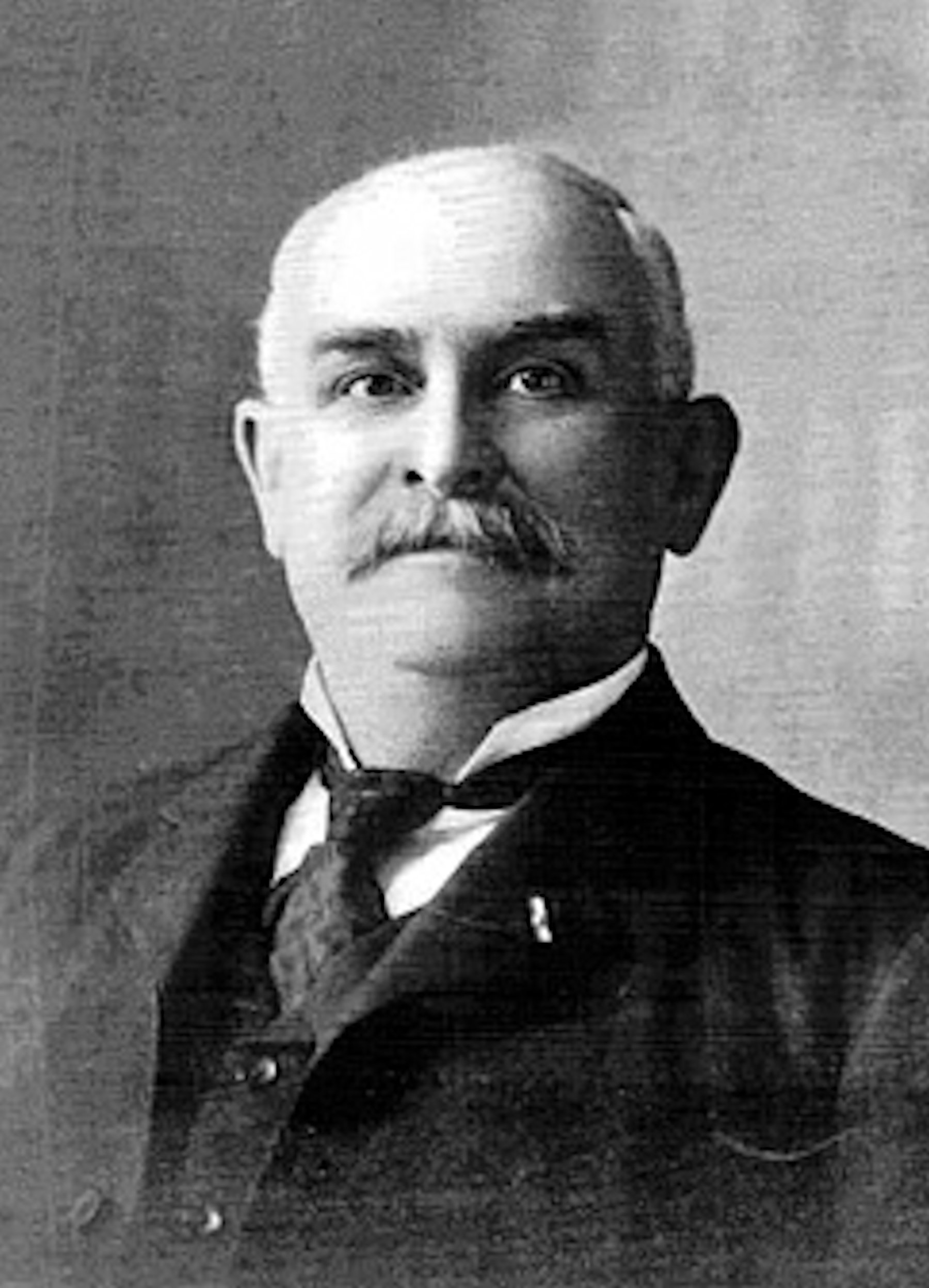
Joseph Sewell-Gerrish GAR 1913

Joseph Sewell Gerrish Sweatt (October 23, 1843 - February 14, 1914) was an American soldier during the American Civil War. He was awarded his medal of honor for actions at Carrsville, Virginia, on May 15, 1863.

== Biography ==
Born in Boscawen, New Hampshire, on October 23, 1843, he served as a private in Company C of the 6th Massachusetts Infantry. First enlisting in May 1861 into the 2nd Massachusetts Infantry, he was discharged after the death of his mother but soon reenlisted in September 1862 after her death. He earned his medal at Carrsville on May 15, 1863, when he attempted with the aid of David Goodhue to rescue the wounded George Fox. Goodhue was killed and Sweatt and Fox were taken prisoner and held in Libby Prison, where Fox later died.

Prior to the war, Sweatt was a brass worker. He worked in Charlestown after the war at the navy yard and as a fireman. He made his own firm, Sweatt & Chase, and retired in 1901. He died in East Billerica on February 14, 1914, and is now buried in Medford's Oak Grove Cemetery. He was married to Sarah Hume and had five children with her. A loyal member of the G.A.R, he was buried at two o'clock pm on February 18, 1914.

== Medal of Honor Citation ==
When ordered to retreat this soldier turned and rushed back to the front, in the face of heavy fire of the enemy, in an endeavor to rescue his wounded comrades, remaining by them until overpowered and taken prisoner.

Date Issued: March 22, 1892
