= Kim Clark (candidate) =

American politician (born 1959)

Kim Clark (born April 6, 1959) was a creative professional active in film, television, and live performance. He was a businessman and community leader in Three Oaks, Michigan and Chicago, Illinois where he had lived for the past 15 years with his partner David Fink. Their Michigan-based creative efforts having been featured in The New York Times. Clark is also an ethicist who specializes in poverty and documentary filmmaking, an expert pipe organ builder, and full-time teacher at DePaul University. Kim died on April 19, 2018.

== Education ==
Clark received a Bachelor of Science degree in applied psychology from Loyola University Chicago and a diploma in Christian education from the Moody Bible Institute,

== Career ==
Clark began his professional career in banking and marketing. Over the course of several years, Clark served as Assistant Vice President at Chicago Cosmopolitan Bank, Executive Vice President of the consulting firm Telestudies, Associate Creative Director at Young & Rubicam and as a partner in Lakeside Management, Inc.

Clark has held simultaneous offices in New York, Chicago, and Los Angeles. His longtime writing partner Steve Zacharias wrote the definitive comedy Revenge of the Nerds. Together, he and Clark have written and produced new works while fostering young writers in screenwriting careers.

=== Education ===
For several years, Clark crafted, and later headed, the writing program for The Second City Training Center. Students and educating colleagues includes well-known jo writer Joe Kelly, Conan O'Brien staff writer Brian Stack, Daily Show writer Allison Sliverman, Kevin Dorff, Seth Meyers, Horatio Sanz, Amy Poehler and many others.

While teaching and developing the program, Clark's collaborative and writing partner was Second City improv guru Martin de Maat. Their work in New York, Los Angeles and Chicago redefined teaching, comedic ethical value, tone and manner for a generation of students. Among de Maat's most notable quotes were "no one will follow you down the road if you are holding a banner that reads 'onward toward mediocrity'" and "You are pure potential."

Clark was a featured speaker at the Chicago Tribune's Printer's Row Book Fair (2001) along with Sheldon Patinkin and Saturday Night Live cast member Tim Kazurinsky. The trio were described by the Chicago Sun Times columnist Bill Zwecker as "Second City Improv Comedy Legends."

From 2001-2003, Clark served as Artistic Director and Educational Director at the Chicago Center for Performing Arts. While there, he contributed to the Players Workshop masters classes, teaching Writing, Directing, On-Camera Technique and other classes.

An avid traveller for much of his life, Clark held a longtime interest in the Galapagos Islands, culminating in a residency on San Cristobal Island beginning in the summer of 2005. Invited by the Galapagos Marine Ecology team at the University of Arizona, Clark, along with a group of 12 secondary and post-secondary teachers, worked with residents of several island communities to teach English to local school children. Clark and Karen Ford-Manza Tompson, former Executive Director of the National Alliance for the Mentally Ill in Kansas and current Executive Director at Arizona Family Planning Council, co-authored a work regarding tectonic plate movement which was later reviewed by Rice University Staff (Linked below) The paper was entitled "The Geology and Vulcanology of the Galapagos Islands".

=== Professorship at DePaul University ===
For several years, Clark taught screenwriting and ethics part-time at DePaul University's School of Cinema and Digital Media before accepting a full-time position with the university's College of Communications. There, he teaches Documentary Production, Ethics in Cinema and Gaming, and Media Ethics. As a faculty member, he created and sponsored an extra-curricular creative writing workshop for students called Acting Out. The workshop's goal was to create and polish scripts that could then be optioned for free by the school's production-focused students.

In 2010, Clark partnered with Patricia Werhane, formerly the Ruffin Professor of Business Ethics at Darden, to plan a new venture. She now holds a joint appointment at Darden and at DePaul University, where she is Wicklander Chair in Business Ethics and Director of the Institute for Business and Professional Ethics. Her latest book is Alleviating Poverty Through Profitable Partnerships with Routledge. This team is creating global poverty awareness and preparing to send a team to produce and direct documentary film projects to raise public awareness of micro-lending in Bangladesh. The Bangladesh segment of the project begins with IIRD (Institute of Integrated Rural Development), an NGO with a stated mission to create a model of rural development that can be replicated in any area of the Bangladesh - one that will facilitate the creation of the strong society.

The project's success thus far has led to an expansion of the project into other topics and locations, such as wage theft, the effects on families for incarcerating parents for non-violent crimes, and examinations of other international models of poverty solution in Tanzania and Haiti.

Clark is also a frequent speaker at international ethics conferences. Recent presentations include: "Video and Pedagogy" for the International Society of Business, Economics and Ethics, in Warsaw, Poland, "The Many Facets of Trust" with Patricia Werhane, Laura Hartman, and David Bevan for the European Business Ethics Network in Trento, Italy, and "Documenting Solutions to World Poverty" at the 10th EABIS Colloquium (hosted by the Graduate School of Management, St. Petersburg University).

=== Fellowships and chairs ===
Clark is the president of Harbor Arts, a Michigan Not-for-profit which has been responsible for dozens of public performances every year, and has featured new artists as well as some of the most popular performers in the world. Baritone Nathan Gunn, arguably the most in demand male singer in the world (Newsweek) sang under the Harbor Arts organization in 2008. In Spring 2009 they featured New York Metropolitan Opera mezzo-soprano Isola Jones, who has often been paired with Luciano Pavarotti and Plácido Domingo.

Clark serves on the Board of Writers in the Heartland— a residency program in Central Illinois founded to nurture emerging and established writers. Their mission is to provide a tranquil environment conductive to artistic production and intellectual exchange. Using retreats, sabbaticals and paid stays, candidates may be selected to complete work of merit at little or no cost to themselves. Writers in the Heartland is currently funding scholarships to develop the work of talented writers on an annual basis.

Clark is also a member of the Advisory Board for Southwest Michigan College, which is active in the development of a new degree program in contemporary Theater and Performing Arts Technology. As planned, the school has announced that the degree will begin in 2011.

In 2010, Clark was awarded the Wicklander Fellowship, which is given to full-time DePaul faculty for the application of professional ethics as the topics relate a particular field of research.

== Writing and directing ==
=== Screenwriting ===
Clark has written two plays, Binding Arbitration and Girl Talk, both of which have been produced. In 2000, Clark premiered the original stage play "Girl Talk" at the Other Side Stage Festival on a co-bill with young monologist David Sedaris. The premiere fell in the same week Sedaris' book "Naked" hit the New York Times best seller list for the first time.

He has created numerous comedic shorts with the Second City team, co-writing and directing with many contributors including director Gail Mancuso whose recent webisodes featuring "30 Rock" star Jane Krakowski feature a modern take on two of Hollywood's most iconic romance films — Gone with the Wind and King Kong. Gail's direction includes on-camera comment as a part of the comedic fun.

=== Stage directing ===
In 2005 Clark directed Tops or Bottoms, a play by Todd Logan featuring Judy Blue and Richard Shavzin. This new work went on the explore the interchanges of marriage and love over years if tune.

Conceptually the play examined certain experiences "we all go through ... Logan does what good artists do best: he doesn't tell us about these experiences or why they're important, he dramatizes them.

— Windy City Times

Logan has filled his script with a wealth of great lines ... Clark. . . allows us to hear them well.

— Skyline/Lerner News

I loved the show .... Tops or Bottoms is alive with humanity. Todd Logan's piece brought us in the character's world with powerful and endearing humor. His words speak in such a familiar way that all generations can identify.

— ChicagoCritic.com

Clark/Logan have an abundance of wry wit . . . interesting and thought provoking

— Chicago Reader

In 2004–05 Clark directed a presentation of Washington Irving's classic American Folk Tale, The Legend of Sleepy Hollow.

This musical comedy was written by Judy Freed, music by Elizabeth Doyle and lyrics by Owen Kalt. This production included two full casts performing the same show at the same time (one visually on stage with puppetry, and one as a Greek chorus orally interpreting the script, with full orchestra.) The production used a novel combination of puppetry traditions- Clark used bunraku, a Japanese form of puppetry, elements of Balinese shadow puppetry, traditional stick puppets, and live actors to tell Washington Irving's classic tale of the scheming schoolmaster and the restless ghost.

Once you get a chest full
of our air, so sweet and restful,
You'll hardly even mind the walking dead!

— Lyrics sung by the Residents of the Village of Sleepy Hollow

=== Producing ===
Clark was producer of the Emmy Award-nominated television series Oh, Grow Up (1999), and executive producer of the film All Good Things (2002).

In 2003 Clark produced and developed The Grouch (based on Menander's The Dys kolos) with the creators of Urinetown, winner 2002 Tony Award for Best Original Score and Best Director, and nominee for Best Musical. Later renamed Wild Goat, composer Mark Hollmann and Chicago playwright Jack Helbig (both alumni of Musical Theatre Writers' Workshop at the Theatre Building Chicago) collaborated on the new musical set on the outskirts of ancient Athens, Greece. In Wild Goat, sparks fly when romance inflames two of the most dysfunctional families this side of the Oedipus clan. Composer Mark Hollman had previously won the 2002 Tony Award, the 2001 Obie Award and received two Drama Desk nominations for his music and lyrics to Urinetown and has helped to create some of Chicago's favorite musical theatre, such as Jack the Chipper, I Think I Can and KABOOOOOM!

For more than ten years, Clark and his partner David Fink have executive produced the Chicago Improv Festival only revealing their financial support in 2007 at the annual CIF Masters Award Ceremony. The Chicago Improv Festival was co-founded by Frances Callier and Jonathan Pitts in 1998 as an educational forum. Over the years it has given voice to performers around the world, including writer/performers Tina Fey and Rachel Dratch (performing Dratch and Fey), Seth Meyers, Frances Callier and scores of other new creative comedy voices. The festival continues and grows annually.

Brooklyn Charmers performing at the Acorn Theater, September, 2026

=== Acorn Theater ===
I simply love the Acorn Theater . . . the spirit there, the setting, the graciousness yet unpretentiousness, harkens back to the time when music (particularly Folk Music) was shared so intimately that by the time an evening of song ended you not only had hope for the future, but you felt that all the people who were there to experience the music with you were folks you could trust, and who you could call friends. The kind of magic provided much of the spirit that evolved during the decades of the 60's and 70's. How fortunate we are to have a performance space, the Acorn Theater, which brings us together as if we were family and can quite naturally find a place of commonality. A place that fairly vibrates with the sincerity, exquisite taste and generosity of its creators. My newest favorite place to play.

— Peter Yarrow

In 2000, Clark and his partner David Fink purchased the old Featherbone factory in Three Oaks, Michigan, which once produced corset stays, and renovated it to house the Acorn Theatre. The name Featherbone stems from the Warren Featherbone Company—a turn of the century American family owned corporation that has far reaching effect on American culture, nature and arts.

The theater is a 300-set multi-disciplinary performing space that features approximately 50 show per year, as well as regular weekly featured events. The theater contains a full Barton theater organ, bar, wine shop, and guest rooms for performers.

Since that time, Clark has acted as artistic director and has worked to revitalize downtown Three Oaks. In addition to the action on stage, the Acorn Theater has been a proving ground for writers, dancers and directors including the American stage director David Cromer . Mr. Cromer is now one of the country's top Broadway theater directors and was recently awarded a MacArthur Fellowship.

These efforts have helped Three Oaks to be designated part of Gov. Jennifer Granholm's Cool Cities Initiative in Michigan. What began as a summer arts project, evolved into a Theater District with local Art House Cinema the Vicker's Theatre, a converted turn of the century livery building that now boasts a balcony, hardwood flooring and hand crafted practical arts to rival any venue in the hemisphere. First run programming brings foreign and independent cinema to the small-town of Three Oaks Michigan. Clark and Vickers teamed up to create the Sounds of Silents Film Festival, a silent film series intended to reinvigorate the history and relevance of early 16-fps frame rate films. These screenings featured original contemporary scores and were performed both in- and out-doors. Early in the series, a screening of The Battleship Potemkin was very favorably reviewed by Roger Ebert, who wrote, "It was the music, I think, along with the unusual setting, that was able to break through my long familiarity with Battleship Potemkin and make me understand, better than ever before, why this movie was long considered dangerous."

=== Notable performers ===
Over the past few years, the Acorn has presented many musicians, acts and troupes, including: Sheena Easton, John Waite, Tiffany, Los Lobos, Peter Yarrow, The Ides Of March, Steve Earle, Nathan Gunn (Preeminent Baritone/ Barahunk - latest CD "Just Before Sunrise"), Jefferson Airplane (beginning their "Woodstock Reunion Tour"), Mavis Staples, Dan Tyminski (Grammy winner, of Alison Krauss, Union Station, and O Brother, Where Art Thou?), Judith Owen (Comedic Songstress - latest CD - Mopping Up Karma), Cowboy Junkies (Alternative – Double Platinum Albums include The Trinity Session – Natural Born Killers), Todd Snider ("Todd Snider's compressed story-songs are so vivid and knowing that they seem completely plausible" - Rolling Stone), Anne Harris , Cracker, Steve Evans, Bela Fleck , The BoDeans, Autumn Defense, Richie Havens, Poi Dog Pondering, The Guitars of Spain, Pacifica Quartet, Tom Wopat, Howard Levy, Tom Dreesen, and many others.

=== Profile in The New York Times ===
The New York Times authored a full-page profile of Clark and his longtime partner David Fink in a story entitled "A Getaway That Happens to Include a Theater" (Published: December 21, 2007). When asked about creating a small, influential theater project that has now set world class innovation standards, Clark said "It's like the first time you fall in love. You flip, through fear that you're doing it wrong, and confidence that no one else has had this feeling before in real life." Once in a lifetime lightning does strike twice in the same place, as they were profiled again in a second article entitled "Our Town Stage for the Creative Set" also written by the New York Times. (Article referenced below.) "We're living our dream life," he said. "It is just impossible anywhere else."

The Chicago Tribune featured Clark and Fink in a story entitled "From the ground up at The Acorn Theater, big-city acts thrive in small-town Michigan" on November 2, 2008. . The pair have been featured in Rick Kogan's popular weekly column in the Chicago Tribune Sidewalks, which has since been collected in two hardcover books. Clark and Fink are also frequent guests on Kogan's Sunday morning WGN-AM radio show, The Sunday Papers.

The Acorn Theater itself was also profiled on HGTV show Building Character', as well as two of the network's other programs, Rezoned and Offbeat America.

== 2006 congressional campaign ==
On April 5, 2006, Clark announced his candidacy for Michigan's 6th congressional district, running as the Democratic challenger to Republican Congressman Fred Upton of St. Joseph, Michigan. Clark focused his campaign on improving education and jobs in southwest Michigan, as well as calling for a responsible withdrawal of troops from Iraq. In the general election, Clark lost to Upton, earning 39 percent of the vote.

== Renaissance Weekend ==
In 2012, Clark and his partner David Fink were invited to speak and participate at the five-day Renaissance Weekend held at the Aspen Institute in Aspen, Colorado.

Renaissance Weekends are structured to encourage the transcendence of political, economic, and religious differences by bringing together distinguished participants from a wide range of fields, including CEOs, entrepreneurs, Nobel laureates, and prime ministers. Past participants include Hillary Clinton, Al Franken, Stephen Colbert, and Ruth Bader Ginsburg. The Weekends are geared towards the establishment of an environment free of partisanship and commercialism, where "civility prevails." Membership is by invitation only.
