= Edwin W. Keightley =

American politician

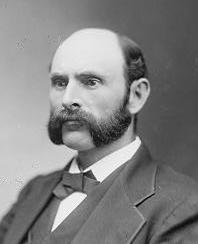
- Brady-Handy Collection, Library of Congress. Circa 1877.

Member of the U.S. House of Representatives from Michigan's 4th district
- In office March 4, 1877 – March 3, 1879
- Preceded by: Allen Potter
- Succeeded by: Julius C. Burrows

Personal details
- Born: August 7, 1843 Scott, Indiana, U.S.
- Died: May 4, 1926 (aged 82) Constantine, Michigan, U.S.
- Party: Republican
- Spouse: Mary C. Coffinberry (after 1868)
- Education: University of Michigan

Edwin William Keightley (August 7, 1843 – May 4, 1926) was a politician from the U.S. state of Michigan.

Keightley was born on a farm near Scott in Lagrange County, Indiana. His parents, Peter L. and Elizabeth (Winter) Keightly, emigrated from Lincolnshire, England; the former in 1831, and the latter in 1828. They settled on the farm in Van Buren township in 1836, and soon after they were married. Keightley attended the local common schools, Lagrange Academy, and Valparaiso Collegiate Institute. He was graduated from the law department of the University of Michigan at Ann Arbor in 1865 and was admitted to the bar. He commenced practice at White Pigeon, Michigan, several miles northwest of his family home in Scott. While practicing law, he was also editor of the White Pigeon Republican, a staunch advocate of Republican Party views and policy.

In 1867, Keightley moved to Constantine, Michigan, and entered into a law partnership with Judge S. C. Coffinberry, which ended in 1869, on amicable terms. He was married on July 14, 1868, to Mary Mitchell, the daughter of Thomas Mitchell, a long-time resident of Constantine, and closely identified with its manufacturing and material interests.

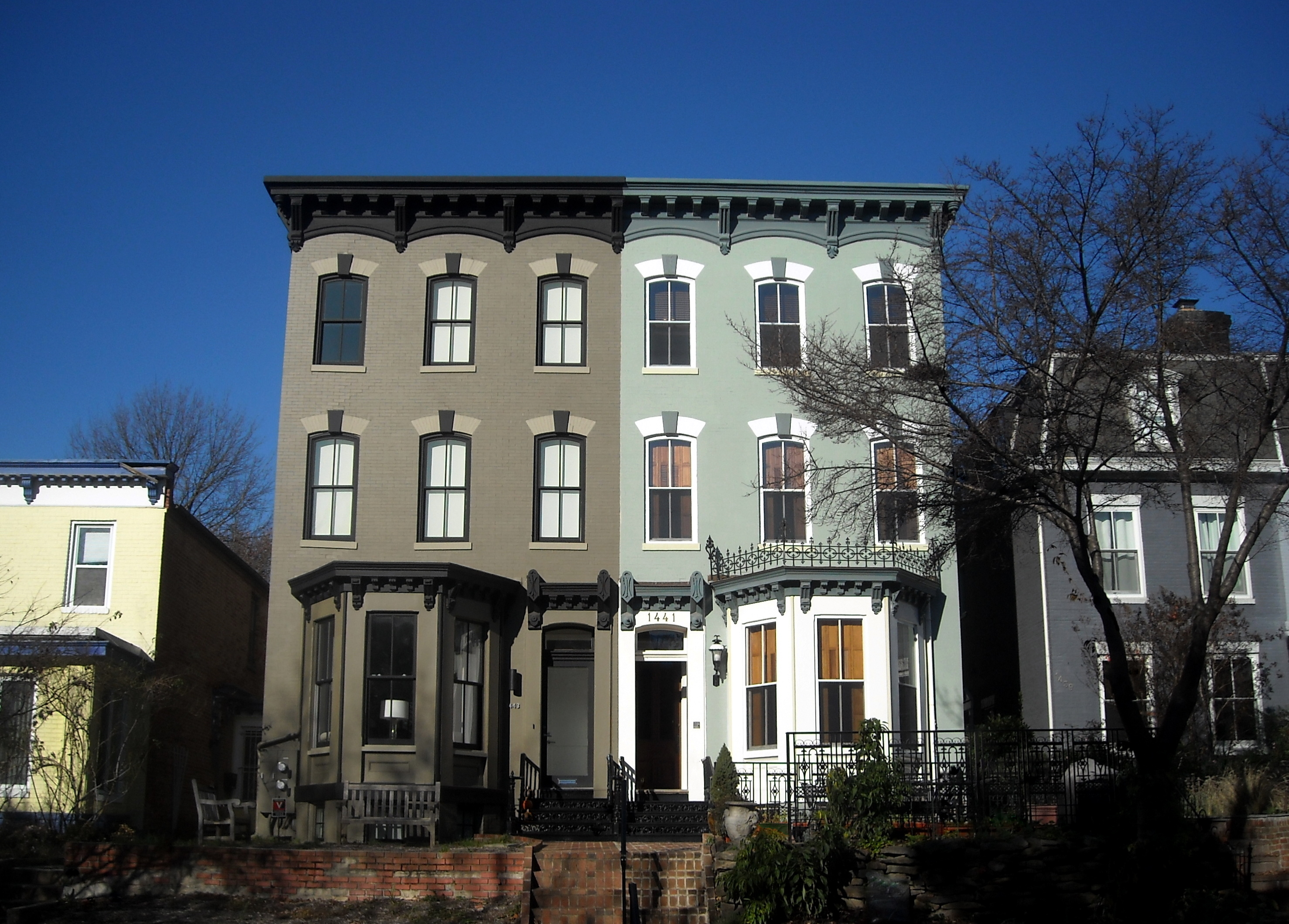
Keightley's former residence (left), located in the Logan Circle neighborhood of Washington, D.C.

In 1872, he was elected prosecuting attorney of St. Joseph County, serving until January 21, 1874, when he was appointed by Michigan Governor John J. Bagley to be judge of the 15th circuit court of Michigan, comprising the counties of St. Joseph and Branch County. He was elected to the position in the spring of 1875.

In 1876, he was elected as a Republican from Michigan's 4th congressional district to the 45th United States Congress, serving from March 4, 1877, to March 3, 1879.

Keightley was appointed by U.S. President Rutherford B. Hayes as the Third Auditor of the United States Treasury Department and served from April 30, 1879, to April 30, 1885, when he resigned. He resumed the practice of his profession in Chicago, Illinois. He moved to Constantine, Michigan, in 1899 and engaged in agricultural pursuits until his death there. He was interred in Constantine Cemetery.

U.S. House of Representatives
Preceded by Allen Potter	United States Representative for the 4th congressional district of Michigan; 1877 – 1879	Succeeded by Julius C. Burrows
