= Valparai (disambiguation) =

Valparai is a Taluk and hill station in the Coimbatore district of Tamil Nadu, India.

Valparai may also refer to:

- Valparai taluk
- Valparai (state assembly constituency)

== See also ==
- Valparaiso (disambiguation)
