= Valparaiso (disambiguation) =

Valparaíso is a city in Chile.

Valparaiso may also refer to:

== Places ==
=== Brazil ===
- Valparaíso, São Paulo
- Valparaíso de Goiás

=== Canada ===
- Valparaiso, Saskatchewan

=== Chile ===
- Valparaíso
- Valparaíso Region
- Valparaíso Province
- Greater Valparaíso

=== Colombia ===
- Valparaíso, Antioquia
- Valparaíso, Caquetá

=== Mexico ===
- Valparaíso, Zacatecas

=== Spain ===
- Valparaíso de Arriba, Cuenca
- Historic name for the district of Sacromonte, Granada

=== United States ===
- Valparaiso, Florida
- Valparaiso, Indiana
  - Valparaiso Collegiate Institute
  - Valparaiso High School
  - Valparaiso University
    - Valparaiso Beacons, this university's athletic program
    - Valparaiso University School of Law, the university's now-defunct law school
- Valparaiso, Nebraska

== Other uses ==
- Valparaiso (play), a stage play by Don DeLillo that was first performed in 1999
- "Valparaiso", a 1996 song by Sting from Mercury Falling
- "Valparaiso", a 1998 song by Anggun from Snow on the Sahara (1998)
- Valparaiso Moraine is a geographic feature from the Wisconsin Glaciation, 14,000 years before present
- Battle of Valparaiso in the War of 1812

== See also ==
- Valpo (disambiguation)
