= Michigan's 4th congressional district =

U.S. House district for Michigan

Coordinates: 43°43′54″N 84°45′01″W

- Interactive map of district boundaries since January 3, 2023
- Representative: Bill Huizenga; R–Holland
- Distribution: 63.33% rural; 36.67% urban
- Population (2025): 793,679
- Median household income: $77,889
- Ethnicity: 75.0% White; 8.6% Hispanic; 8.3% Black; 4.8% Two or more races; 2.5% Asian; 0.8% other
- Cook PVI: R+3

Michigan's 4th congressional district is a United States congressional district located in the state of Michigan. The current 4th district contains much of Michigan's old 6th district, and includes all of Allegan and Van Buren counties, as well as portions of Ottawa, Kalamazoo, Calhoun, and Berrien counties. In 2022, the district was redrawn to start in St. Joseph Township and extend north to Port Sheldon Township. The 4th is currently represented by Republican Bill Huizenga, who previously represented the old 2nd district.

== Composition ==
For the 118th and successive Congresses (based on redistricting following the 2020 census), the district contains all or portions of the following counties and municipalities:

Allegan County (35)

All 35 municipalities

Berrien County (12)

Bainbridge Township, Benton Charter Township, Benton Harbor, Coloma, Coloma Charter Township, Hagar Township, Lincoln Charter Township (part; also 5th), Shoreham, St. Joseph, St. Joseph Charter Township, Watervliet, Watervliet Charter Township

Calhoun County (5)

Battle Creek, Bedford Charter Township, Emmett Charter Township, Pennfield Charter Township, Springfield

Kalamazoo County (18)

Alamo Township, Augusta, Charleston Township, Climax, Climax Township, Comstock Charter Township, Cooper Charter Township, Galesburg, Kalamazoo, Kalamazoo Charter Township, Oshtemo Charter Township, Parchment, Pavilion Charter Township, Portage, Richland, Richland Township, Ross Township, Texas Charter Township

Ottawa County (11)

Blendon Township, Georgetown Charter Township (part; also 3rd; includes part of Allendale CDP and Jenison), Holland (shared with Allegan County), Holland Charter Township, Hudsonville, Jamestown Charter Township, Olive Township, Park Township, Port Sheldon Township, Zeeland, Zeeland Charter Township

Van Buren County (29)

All 29 municipalities

== Recent election results from statewide races ==
Year	Office	Results
2008	President	Obama 50% - 48%
2012	President	Romney 53% - 47%
2014	Senate	Lynn Land 51% - 44%
2014	Governor	Snyder 60% - 38%
2014	Secretary of State	Johnson 61% - 35%
2014	Attorney General	Schuette 59% - 36%
2016	President	Trump 52% - 42%
2018	Senate	James 52% - 46%
2018	Governor	Schuette 49% - 47%
2018	Attorney General	Leonard 52% - 43%
2020	President	Trump 51% - 47%
2020	Senate	James 54% - 44%
2022	Governor	Whitmer 50% - 49%
2022	Secretary of State	Benson 51% - 47%
2022	Attorney General	DePerno 49% - 48%
2024	President	Trump 52% - 46%
2024	Senate	Rogers 52% - 46%

== History ==
Michigan's 4th congressional district was first formed in 1852. At this time It covered everywhere from Macomb County to the western end of the Upper Peninsula. Ingham County was not in the district, and then the boundary turned northward after Eaton County only going west again Midland County was reached. It went west again along Midland and subsequent counties southern lines and then headed north again on the east side of Muskegon County, with Manistee being its southern county that bordered Lake Michigan.

In 1863 it gained the areas around Grand Rapids and Muskegon but lost everything east of Ionia County and most of the Upper Peninsula. In 1872 it was redrawn to cover Berrien, Cass, Kalamazoo, Van Buren and St. Joseph Counties. In 1892 these boundaries were altered by the addition of Allegan and Barry Counties but the subtraction of Kalamazoo County. This remained the district boundaries for the next 72 years.

In 1964 the 4th district was redrawn. Barry County was subtracted from the district while Branch and Hillsdale Counties were added. In 1972 the district boundaries were altered by adding small sections of Calhoun County and subtracting small portions of Hillsdale and St. Joseph Counties.

The 1982 redistricting removed from the district all of Hillsdale County and the portion of Calhoun County that was in the district. Quincy and Butler Townships in Branch County were also removed. In Kalamazoo County Schoolcraft Township and most of Portage were added to the district. The southern and western portions of Allegan County and most of western Ottawa County including Holland, Michigan were also in the district.

In the renumbering of 1992 this district essentially became the 6th, while the old 10th became the new 4th.

=== The old 10th and 1990s 4th ===
The old 10th included most of Grand Traverse and all of Kalkaska County which were lost to the new 1st (old 11th) in the 1992 redistricting. It also included Wexford County that was moved to the new 2nd (old 9th) in the 1992 redistricting. The only other areas lost were small parts of Antrim and Iosco Counties and a portion of Shiawasee County consisting of Durand and Vernon Township.

The new 4th gained Montcalm county from the old 9th district. It gained the Clinton and most of the Shiawasee portions of the old 6th district and the northern half of Oscoda County. It also gained a portion of south-west Saginaw County and the portion of Midland County that had not been in the old 10th.

In 2002 Leelaunau County and a small section of north-west Grand Traverse County were the only areas gerrymandered from the 1st and other districts into the 4th that had not been in the old 10th.

== List of members representing the district ==
Member	Party	Years	Cong ress	Electoral history	District location
District created March 4, 1853
Hestor L. Stevens (Pontiac)	Democratic	March 4, 1853 – March 3, 1855	33rd	Elected in 1852. Retired.	
George Washington Peck (Lansing)	Democratic	March 4, 1855 – March 3, 1857	34th	Elected in 1854. Lost re-election.	
De Witt C. Leach (Lansing)	Republican	March 4, 1857 – March 3, 1861	35th 36th	Elected in 1856. Re-elected in 1858. Retired.	
Rowland E. Trowbridge (Birmingham)	Republican	March 4, 1861 – March 3, 1863	37th	Elected in 1860. Redistricted to the 5th district and lost re-election.	
Francis William Kellogg (Grand Rapids)	Republican	March 4, 1863 – March 3, 1865	38th	Redistricted from the 3rd district and re-elected in 1862. Retired.	
Thomas W. Ferry (Grand Haven)	Republican	March 4, 1865 – March 3, 1871	39th 40th 41st	Elected in 1864. Re-elected in 1866. Re-elected in 1868. Re-elected in 1870 but declined the seat when elected U.S. Senator.	
Vacant		March 4, 1871 – December 4, 1871	42nd		
Wilder D. Foster (Grand Rapids)	Republican	April 4, 1871 – March 3, 1873	42nd	Elected April 4, 1871 to finish Ferry's term and seated December 4, 1871. Redistricted to the 5th district.	
Julius C. Burrows (Kalamazoo)	Republican	March 4, 1873 – March 3, 1875	43rd	Elected in 1872. Lost re-election.	
Allen Potter (Kalamazoo)	Democratic	March 4, 1875 – March 3, 1877	44th	Elected in 1874. Retired.	
Edwin W. Keightley (Constantine)	Republican	March 4, 1877 – March 3, 1879	45th	Elected in 1876. Retired.	
Julius C. Burrows (Kalamazoo)	Republican	March 4, 1879 – March 3, 1883	46th 47th	Elected in 1878. Re-elected in 1880. Lost re-election.	
George L. Yaple (Mendon)	Democratic (Note: George L. Yaple was elected as a fusion candidate, but was seated in Congress with the Democrats.)	March 4, 1883 – March 3, 1885	48th	Elected in 1882. Lost re-election.	
Julius C. Burrows (Kalamazoo)	Republican	March 4, 1885 – March 3, 1893	49th 50th 51st 52nd	Elected in 1884. Re-elected in 1886. Re-elected in 1888. Re-elected in 1890. Redistricted to the 3rd district.	
Henry F. Thomas (Allegan)	Republican	March 4, 1893 – March 3, 1897	53rd 54th	Elected in 1892. Re-elected in 1894. Lost renomination.	
Edward L. Hamilton (Niles)	Republican	March 4, 1897 – March 3, 1921	55th 56th 57th 58th 59th 60th 61st 62nd 63rd 64th 65th 66th	Elected in 1896. Re-elected in 1898. Re-elected in 1900. Re-elected in 1902. Re-elected in 1904. Re-elected in 1906. Re-elected in 1908. Re-elected in 1910. Re-elected in 1912. Re-elected in 1914. Re-elected in 1916. Re-elected in 1918. Retired.	
John C. Ketcham (Hastings)	Republican	March 4, 1921 – March 3, 1933	67th 68th 69th 70th 71st 72nd	Elected in 1920. Re-elected in 1922. Re-elected in 1924. Re-elected in 1926. Re-elected in 1928. Re-elected in 1930. Lost re-election.	
George E. Foulkes (Hartford)	Democratic	March 4, 1933 – January 3, 1935	73rd	Elected in 1932. Lost re-election.	
Clare Hoffman (Allegan)	Republican	January 3, 1935 – January 3, 1963	74th 75th 76th 77th 78th 79th 80th 81st 82nd 83rd 84th 85th 86th 87th	Elected in 1934. Re-elected in 1936. Re-elected in 1938. Re-elected in 1940. Re-elected in 1942. Re-elected in 1944. Re-elected in 1946. Re-elected in 1948. Re-elected in 1950. Re-elected in 1952. Re-elected in 1954. Re-elected in 1956. Re-elected in 1958. Re-elected in 1960. Retired.	
Edward Hutchinson (St. Joseph)	Republican	January 3, 1963 – January 3, 1977	88th 89th 90th 91st 92nd 93rd 94th	Elected in 1962. Re-elected in 1964. Re-elected in 1966. Re-elected in 1968. Re-elected in 1970. Re-elected in 1972. Re-elected in 1974. Retired.	
David Stockman (St. Joseph)	Republican	January 3, 1977 – January 21, 1981	95th 96th 97th	Elected in 1976. Re-elected in 1978. Re-elected in 1980. Resigned to become Director of the Office of Management and Budget.	
Vacant		January 21, 1981 – April 21, 1981	97th		
Mark Siljander (Three Rivers)	Republican	April 21, 1981 – January 3, 1987	97th 98th 99th	Elected to finish Stockman's term. Re-elected in 1982. Re-elected in 1984. Lost renomination.	
Fred Upton (St. Joseph)	Republican	January 3, 1987 – January 3, 1993	100th 101st 102nd	Elected in 1986. Re-elected in 1988. Re-elected in 1990. Redistricted to the 6th district.	
Dave Camp (Midland)	Republican	January 3, 1993 – January 3, 2015	103rd 104th 105th 106th 107th 108th 109th 110th 111th 112th 113th	Redistricted from the 10th district and re-elected in 1992. Re-elected in 1994. Re-elected in 1996. Re-elected in 1998. Re-elected in 2000. Re-elected in 2002. Re-elected in 2004. Re-elected in 2006. Re-elected in 2008. Re-elected in 2010. Re-elected in 2012. Retired.	1993–2003
Dave Camp (Midland)	Republican	January 3, 1993 – January 3, 2015	103rd 104th 105th 106th 107th 108th 109th 110th 111th 112th 113th	Redistricted from the 10th district and re-elected in 1992. Re-elected in 1994. Re-elected in 1996. Re-elected in 1998. Re-elected in 2000. Re-elected in 2002. Re-elected in 2004. Re-elected in 2006. Re-elected in 2008. Re-elected in 2010. Re-elected in 2012. Retired.	2003–2013
Dave Camp (Midland)	Republican	January 3, 1993 – January 3, 2015	103rd 104th 105th 106th 107th 108th 109th 110th 111th 112th 113th	Redistricted from the 10th district and re-elected in 1992. Re-elected in 1994. Re-elected in 1996. Re-elected in 1998. Re-elected in 2000. Re-elected in 2002. Re-elected in 2004. Re-elected in 2006. Re-elected in 2008. Re-elected in 2010. Re-elected in 2012. Retired.	2013–2023
John Moolenaar (Midland)	Republican	January 3, 2015 – January 3, 2023	114th 115th 116th 117th	Elected in 2014. Re-elected in 2016. Re-elected in 2018. Re-elected in 2020. Redistricted to the 2nd district.	2013–2023
Bill Huizenga (Holland)	Republican	January 3, 2023 – present	118th 119th	Redistricted from the 2nd district and re-elected in 2022. Re-elected in 2024. Lost re-election.	2023–present
Sean McCann (Kalamazoo)	Democratic	Assuming office on January 3, 2027		Elected in 2026.	2023–present

== Recent election results ==
=== 2012 ===
Michigan's 4th congressional district, 2012
Party	Candidate	Votes	%
Republican	Dave Camp (incumbent)	197,386	63.1
Democratic	Debra Freidell Wirth	104,996	33.6
Libertarian	John Gelineau	4,285	1.4
U.S. Taxpayers'	George Zimmer	3,506	1.1
Green	Pat Timmons	2,776	0.9
Total votes		312,949	100.0
Republican hold			

=== 2014 ===
Michigan's 4th congressional district, 2014
Party	Candidate	Votes	%
Republican	John Moolenaar	123,962	56.5
Democratic	Jeff Holmes	85,777	39.1
U.S. Taxpayers'	George Zimmer	4,990	2.3
Libertarian	Will White	4,694	2.1
Total votes		219,423	100.0
Republican hold			

=== 2016 ===
Michigan's 4th congressional district, 2016
Party	Candidate	Votes	%
Republican	John Moolenaar (incumbent)	194,572	61.6
Democratic	Debra Wirth	101,277	32.1
Libertarian	Leonard Schwartz	8,516	2.7
U.S. Taxpayers'	George M. Zimmer	5,595	1.8
Green	Jordan Salvi	3,953	1.2
Natural Law	Keith Butkovich	1,838	0.6
Total votes		315,751	100.0
Republican hold			

=== 2018 ===
Michigan's 4th congressional district, 2018
Party	Candidate	Votes	%
Republican	John Moolenaar (incumbent)	178,510	62.6
Democratic	Jerry Hilliard	106,540	37.4
Total votes		285,050	100.0
Republican hold			

=== 2020 ===
Michigan's 4th congressional district, 2020
Party	Candidate	Votes	%
Republican	John Moolenaar (incumbent)	242,621	65.0
Democratic	Jerry Hilliard	120,802	32.4
Libertarian	David Canny	5,374	1.4
Green	Amy Slepr	4,448	1.2
Total votes		373,245	100.0
Republican hold			

=== 2022 ===
Michigan's 4th congressional district, 2022
Party	Candidate	Votes	%
Republican	Bill Huizenga (incumbent)	183,936	54.3
Democratic	Joseph Alfonso	143,690	42.4
Libertarian	Lorence Wenke	8,478	2.5
U.S. Taxpayers'	Curtis Michael Clark	2,244	0.6
Total votes		338,348	100.0
Republican hold			

=== 2024 ===
Michigan's 4th congressional district, 2024
Party	Candidate	Votes	%
Republican	Bill Huizenga (incumbent)	234,489	55.1
Democratic	Jessica Swartz	184,641	43.4
Constitution	Curtis Clark	6,687	1.6
Total votes		425,817	100.0
Republican hold			

== See also ==
- Michigan's congressional districts
- List of United States congressional districts
