= Scott, Indiana =

- Unincorporated community
- Location within Indiana Location within the United States
- Coordinates: 41°44′34″N 85°33′28″W
- Country: United States
- State: Indiana
- County: LaGrange
- Township: Van Buren
- Elevation: 840 ft (260 m)
- ZIP code: 46565
- FIPS code: 18-68418
- GNIS feature ID: 2830438

Scott is a small unincorporated community in Van Buren Township, LaGrange County, Indiana.

== History ==
Scott, originally called Van Buren, was platted in 1833. A post office called Scott opened in 1837, and remained in operation until it was discontinued in 1905.

== Geography ==
Scott is located on the Pigeon River near the Indiana Toll Road, just about a mile south of the state border with Michigan.

== Demographics ==
Historical population
Census	Pop.	Note	%±
2023 (est.)	98

The United States Census Bureau defined Scott as a census designated place in the 2022 American Community Survey.

== Notable people ==
- Edwin W. Keightley (1843–1926), U.S. representative from Michigan
