= Clare Hoffman =

American politician (1875–1967)

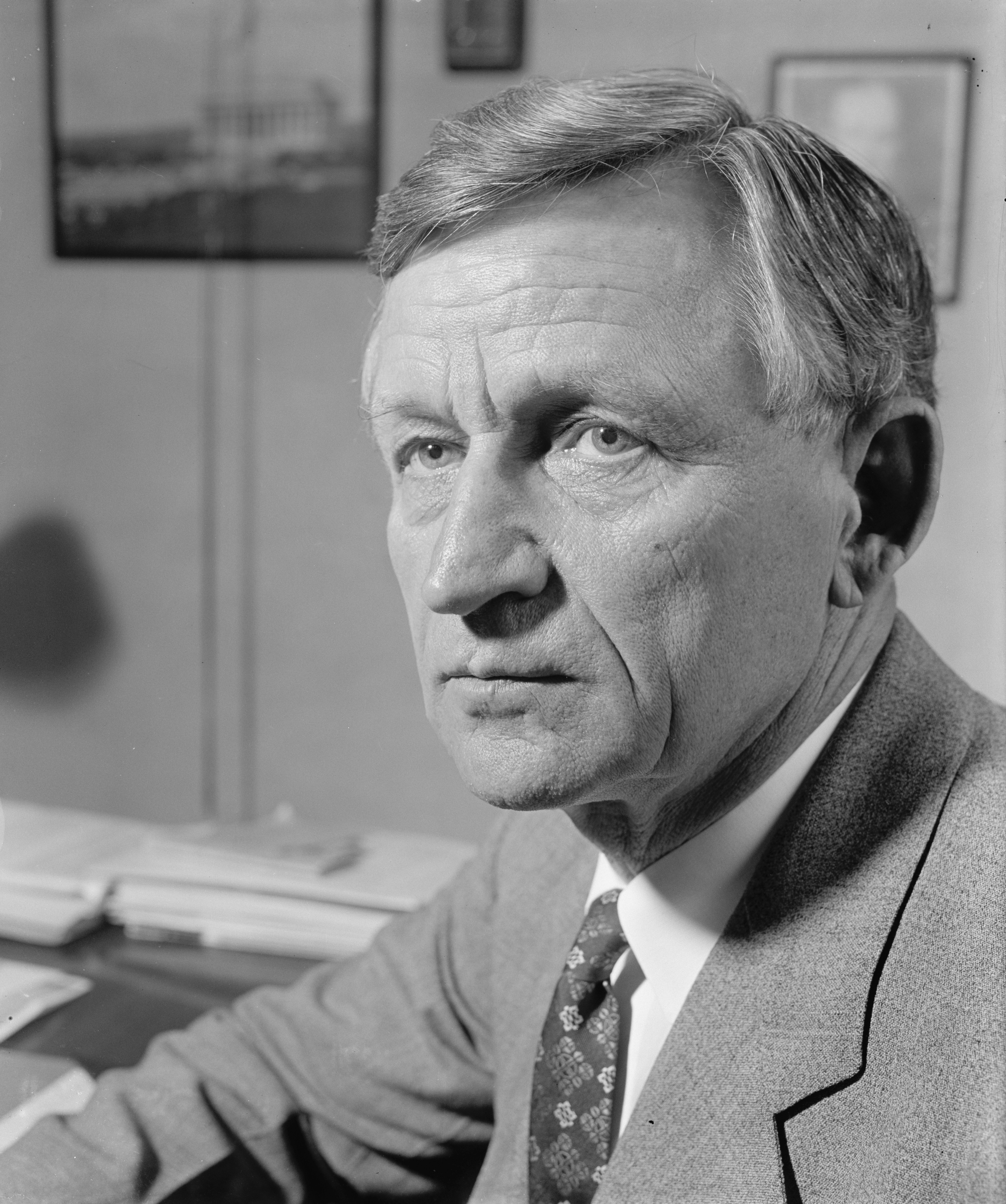

Member of the U.S. House of Representatives from Michigan's 4th district
- In office January 3, 1935 – January 3, 1963
- Preceded by: George E. Foulkes
- Succeeded by: Edward Hutchinson

Personal details
- Born: Clare Eugene Hoffman; September 10, 1875 Vicksburg, Union County, Pennsylvania, U.S.
- Died: November 3, 1967 (aged 92) Allegan, Michigan, U.S.
- Party: Republican
- Education: Northwestern University
- Profession: Attorney

Clare Eugene Hoffman (September 10, 1875 – November 3, 1967) was a United States representative from Michigan's 4th congressional district.

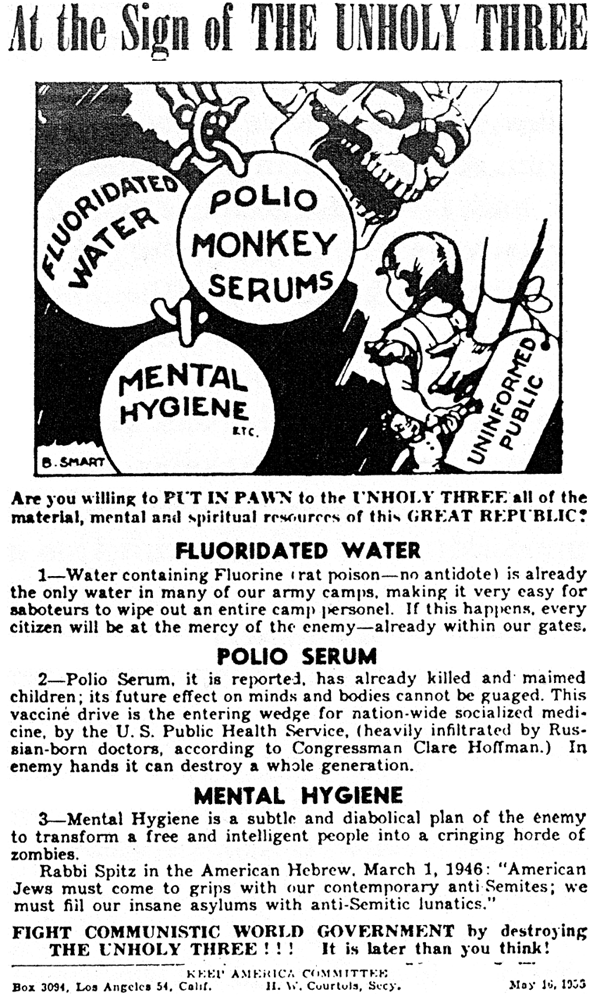
Anti-public health flier which uses Clare Hoffman as a source. Issued in May 1955 by the Keep America Committee, alleging a conspiracy theory that water fluoridation is a communist plot.

== Background ==
Hoffman was born in Vicksburg, Union County, Pennsylvania, where he attended the public schools. He graduated from the law department of Northwestern University in Evanston, Illinois, in 1895.

== Career ==
Hoffman was admitted to the Michigan Bar in 1896 and commenced practice in Allegan, Michigan, where he also became prosecuting attorney for the county from 1904–1910.

In 1934, Hoffman ran as the Republican candidate for Michigan's 4th congressional district, defeating incumbent Democrat George Ernest Foulkes. Hoffman was elected to the Seventy-fourth United States Congress and was re-elected to the thirteen succeeding Congresses, serving from January 3, 1935, until January 3, 1963. He was seen as "a bitter lone wolf" during much of his time in office, unable to work with either the Democrats or the Republicans. Hoffman voted against the Civil Rights Acts of 1957 and 1960, as well as the 24th Amendment to the U.S. Constitution.

Hoffman was a vocal opponent of the National Polio Immunization Program, claiming that the U.S. Public Health Service had been heavily infiltrated by Russian-born doctors. In addition, he was known as an anti-Semite with fascist sympathies, even speaking at rallies held for the far-right America First Party (1943).

He was chairman, Committee on Expenditures in the Executive Departments (Eightieth Congress) and the Committee on Government Operations (Eighty-third Congress). He was not a candidate for renomination in 1962 to the Eighty-eighth Congress.

Hoffman retired to his home in Allegan, Michigan. He was survived by his wife, the former Florence Wasson and sons Carl and Leo.

== Personal and death ==
Hoffman died at home, age 92. He was interred at Oakwood Cemetery in Allegan.

== Bibliography ==
Walker, Donald Edwin. "The Congressional Career of Clare E. Hoffman, 1935-63." Ph.D. diss., Michigan State University, 1982.

== Sources ==
- United States Congress. "Clare Hoffman (id: H000683)". Biographical Directory of the United States Congress.
- The Political Graveyard

U.S. House of Representatives
Preceded by George E. Foulkes	United States Representative for the 4th congressional district of Michigan; 1935–1963	Succeeded by Edward Hutchinson
