= John C. Ketcham =

American politician (1873–1941)

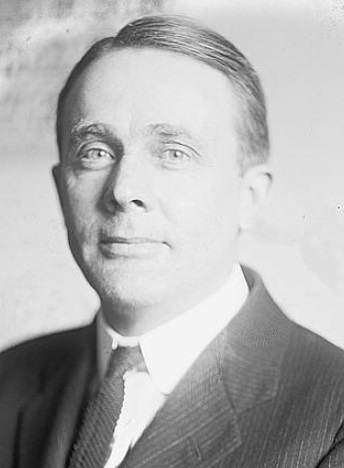
- National Photo Company Collection, Library of Congress

Member of the U.S. House of Representatives from Michigan's 4th district
- In office March 4, 1921 – March 3, 1933
- Preceded by: Edward L. Hamilton
- Succeeded by: George E. Foulkes

Personal details
- Born: January 1, 1873 Toledo, Ohio, U.S.
- Died: December 4, 1941 (aged 68) Hastings, Michigan, U.S.
- Party: Republican

John Clark Ketcham (January 1, 1873 – December 4, 1941) was a politician from the U.S. state of Michigan.

Ketcham was born in Toledo, Ohio, and moved with his parents to Maple Grove, Michigan near Nashville, the same year. He attended the common schools of Barry County and high school at Nashville. He taught in rural and high schools from 1890 to 1899. Ketcham was county commissioner of schools for Barry County, 1899–1907, and chairman of the Republican county committee, 1902–1908. He was postmaster of Hastings, 1907–1914; master of the Michigan State Grange, 1912–1920; and lecturer of the National Grange, 1917–1921.

Ketcham was elected as a Republican from Michigan's 4th congressional district to the 67th United States Congress and to the five succeeding Congresses, serving from March 4, 1921, to March 3, 1933. He was an unsuccessful candidate for reelection in 1932, losing in the general election to Democrat George E. Foulkes.

Ketcham was president of the National Bank of Hastings, 1933–1937; State commissioner of insurance, 1935–1937; and counsel for the Michigan Chain Store Bureau, 1938–1941. He died in Hastings and was interred there in Riverside Cemetery.

He was the son-in-law, of Samuel Azariah Shelton, U.S. Representative from Missouri's 16th congressional district, 1921–1923.

U.S. House of Representatives
Preceded by Edward L. Hamilton	United States Representative for the 4th congressional district of Michigan; 1921 – 1933	Succeeded by George E. Foulkes
