= Art Engstrom =

American football player (1898–1953)

Profile
- Position: Guard

Personal information
- Born: August 23, 1898; Duluth, Minnesota, U.S.
- Died: April 10, 1953 (aged 54); Duluth, Minnesota, U.S.
- Listed height: 5 ft 9 in (1.75 m)
- Listed weight: 185 lb (84 kg)

Career information
- High school: Valparaiso (IN)
- College: Chicago

Career history
- Duluth Kelleys (1924)

Career statistics
- Games played: 1
- Games started: 1
- Stats at Pro Football Reference

Arthur Edward Engstrom (August 23, 1898 – April 10, 1953) was an American football guard who played one season in the National Football League (NFL) for the Duluth Kelleys. He played college football for Chicago.

== Early life and career ==
Engstrom was born on August 23, 1898, in Duluth, Minnesota. He attended Valparaiso High School in Indiana, before playing college football for Chicago. After graduating from Chicago, Engstrom played for the Duluth Kelleys of the National Football League (NFL) in 1924.

He appeared in two games. The first was an exhibition tie against the Ironwood Legion, in which he was starting left guard. He also started in the first game of the regular season, a 6–3 win over the Green Bay Packers. He did not play for the rest of the season, and was not on a team in the next year, finishing his career with just one game at the professional level.

== Death ==
Engstrom died on April 10, 1953, in Duluth, at the age of 54.
