= Valparaiso High School =

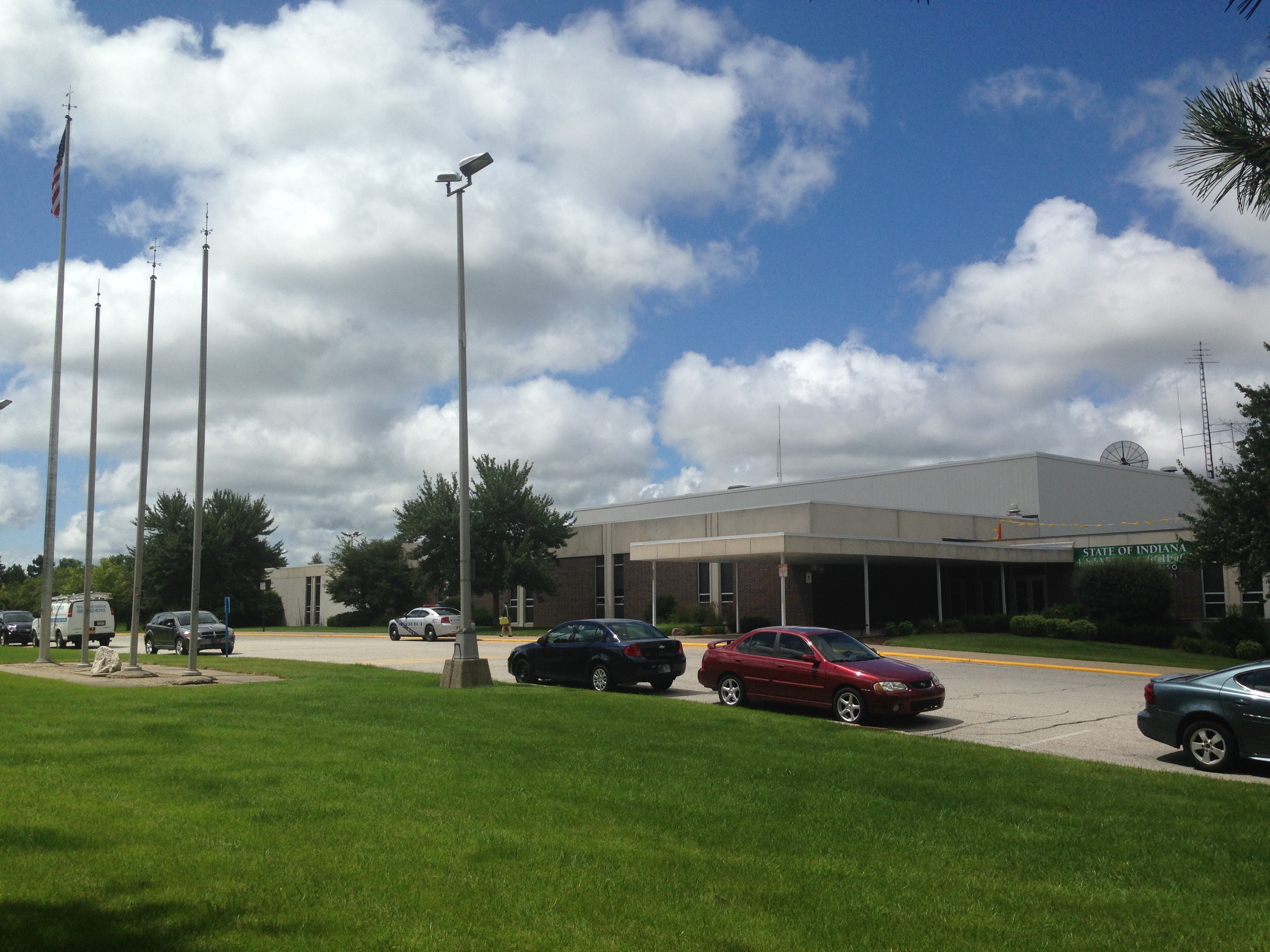

Location
- 2727 North Campbell Street; Valparaiso, Indiana 46385; United States; 41.4931°N 87.0674°W

Information
- Type: Public
- Motto: "A Tradition of Excellence"
- Established: 1871
- School district: Valparaiso Community Schools
- Principal: Veronica Tobon
- Teaching staff: 113.00 (FTE)
- Grades: 9–12
- Enrollment: 2,089 (2024–25)
- Student to teacher ratio: 18.49
- Colors: Green and white
- Athletics conference: Duneland Athletic Conference
- Team name: Vikings
- Newspaper: The Viking Press
- Website: valparaisohigh.valpo.k12.in.us

Valparaiso High School is a public high school in Valparaiso, Indiana, United States. Established in 1871, it is the only high school in Valparaiso and the Valparaiso Community Schools. As of the 2024–25 school year, it has approximately 2,100 students in grades 9 through 12. School colors are green and white and athletic teams are known as the Valparaiso Vikings. They compete in the Indiana High School Athletic Association as members of the Duneland Athletic Conference.

== History ==
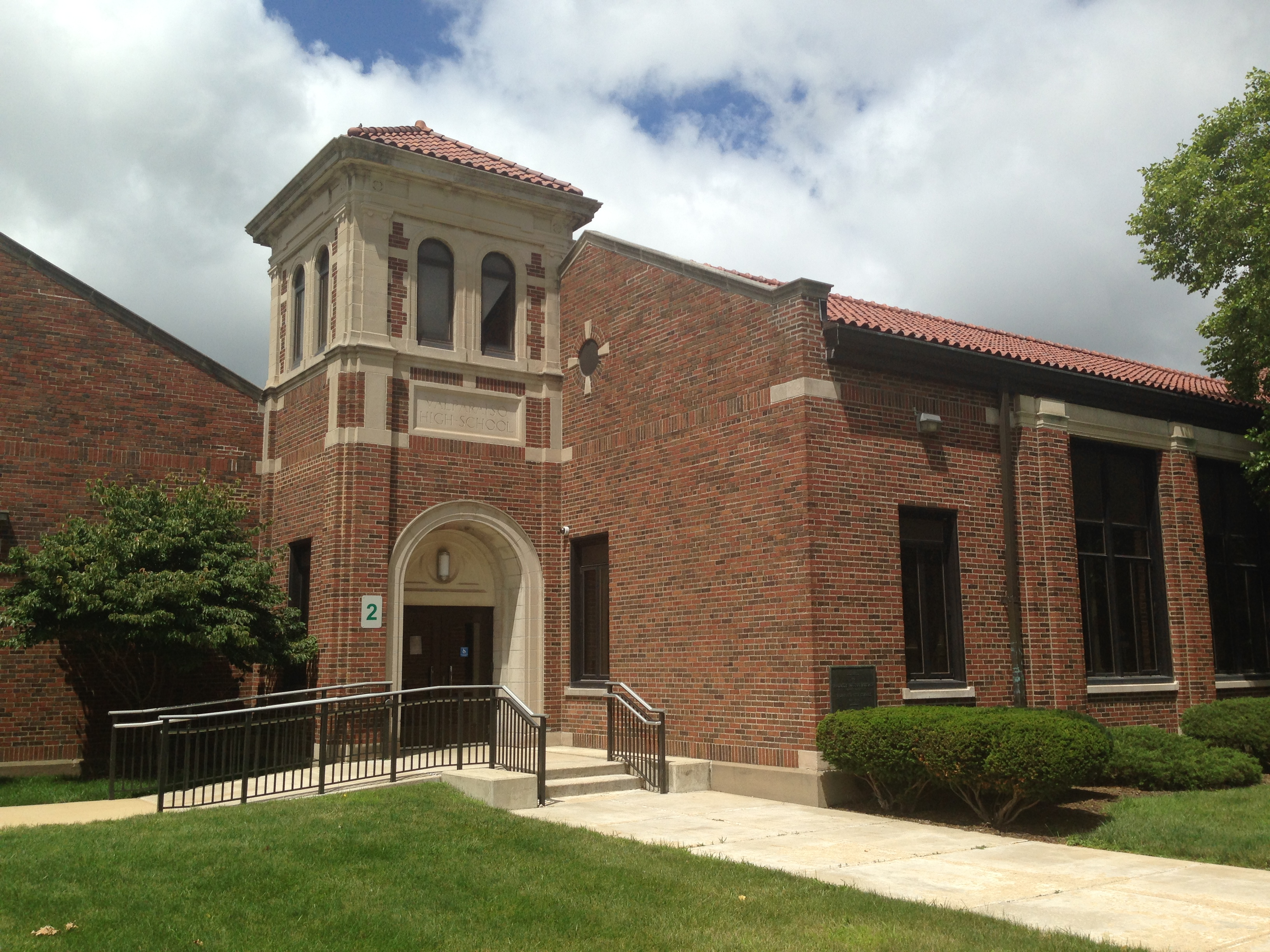
Previous home of Valparaiso High School from 1927 to 1972. It now serves as Benjamin Franklin Middle School

Valparaiso High School opened in 1871 as Valparaiso City Public Graded School in a facility that had been built in 1861 by the local Presbyterian members as the Valparaiso Collegiate Institute on the site of the current Central Elementary School. The Institute closed by 1869 and the building was purchased that year by the city of Valparaiso for $10,069. A third story was added to the original building and an addition which doubled the available classroom space. In the first year, there were 400 students and 10 teachers. Three years later in 1874, the first graduation ceremonies were held for Valparaiso High School. As the community continued to grow in population, overcrowding became a common problem. In 1903, the building was condemned and demolished and replaced with a new building on the same site. During the period before the new facility was completed, classes were held at other locations in town, including the Armory. The new building cost around $80,000 and was designed by Charles Lembke, a local architect. The school faced towards the east and to allow for more attic space, was constructed with a Mansard roof, and also featured large chimneys and a tiered fountain. Although some sources report that the school included all grades, it was most likely used only as a high school.

Enrollment continued to rise so that by the 1920s, a construction of a new school was necessary. A new high school opened in 1927 at 605 North Campbell Street, with a gymnasium finished the following year. This building served as the high school until 1972, and continues to be used as Benjamin Franklin Middle School. The current high school building at 2727 North Campbell Street opened in 1972. In 1988 a field house was added to the west of the original building. A major renovation came in 1993, with a $19 million project adding classrooms to the north section of the building, a new and expanded kitchen and student cafeteria, and renovated administrative and guidance areas. In 1997 a roof was added and in 2004 work began on renovating the football stadium. In 2016, a major renovation was announced, with work to the exterior, classrooms, the auditorium, as well as a new engineering wing and natatorium.

On Wednesday, November 24, 2004, at approximately 7:50 a.m., five students were attacked in a classroom by a 15-year-old student who was armed with a machete and a tree saw. None of the students involved suffered major injuries, and all but one were treated and released from the hospital the same day.

In 2006 and again in 2014, Valparaiso Community Schools signed memoranda of understanding with the Department of Justice to improve race relations in the school.

== Academics ==
In 2004, Valparaiso High School was one of 30 schools chosen nationwide as a model school by an initiative of the Council of Chief State School Officers, the International Center for Leadership in Education and the Bill & Melinda Gates Foundation. The initiative recognizes schools that are successful at providing quality education to all students. The high school's history of continuous improvement on benchmarks, service learning initiative commitments, as well as having offered diverse extracurricular programs were all cited in its achievement. The school also promotes leadership, a model of civility, and a connection to the greater Valparaiso community.

Valparaiso High School has offered the IB Diploma Program since August 1995. Students at VHS usually take IB exams in May. In the last session, students completed the following exams: Biology, Chemistry, Economics, English, French, German, History, Information Technology in Global Society, Mathematics, Music, Physics, Spanish, Theory of Knowledge and Visual Arts.

== Athletics ==
Athletic teams at Valparaiso High School play under the nickname "Vikings" and compete in the Duneland Athletic Conference. The Vikings have won 31 Indiana High School Athletic Association (IHSAA) Championships, tied at 5th most of any Indiana high school.

Sport	State titles	Year(s)
Baseball	1	2025
Boys cross country	6	1966, 1983, 1985, 1986, 1997, 2000
Girls cross country	5	1999, 2000, 2002, 2003, 2004
Football	2	1975, 2022
Girls gymnastics	14	1981, 1991, 1994, 1997, 1998, 2008, 2009, 2010, 2011, 2014, 2015, 2017, 2021, 2023
Boys soccer	1	2004
Unified track and field	2	2019, 2021

=== Mental Attitude Award Winners ===
The "Mental Attitude Award" in the IHSAA, recognizes student-athletes who demonstrate exceptional character, sportsmanship, and a positive mental approach, both on and off the "field".

Valparaiso Mental Attitude Award Winners
Year	Winner
1967	Dan Vandrey
1976	Tom Smith
1976	Carol Bartholomew
1978	Mark Harbold
1979	Gary Krueger
1980	Craig McCarron
1982	Cindy Willis
1984	Scott Schroer
1987	Brett Polizotto
1992	Gina Massuda
1993	Kirsten Johnson
1994	Bryce Drew
1996	Sarah Stricklett
2002	Matt Handlon
2002	Jason Cook
2004	Rebekah Porter
2012	Ahmad Aljobeh
2014	Harley Dubsky
2020	Josh Fedorchak
2021	Sabrina Falk
2023	Connor McCall
2024	Adian Gutierrez
2025	Jonah Lee
2025	Ione Skafish
2025	Drayden Wilcox

== Notable alumni ==
- Mark Blane – American actor and director
- Beulah Bondi – Oscar-nominated and Emmy Award-winning actress; appeared in It's a Wonderful Life and Mr. Smith Goes to Washington
- Mark N. Brown – former NASA astronaut and retired Colonel in the United States Air Force
- Maria Astrologes Combs – professional golfer in the LPGA
- Jon Costas – mayor of the city of Valparaiso, 2003–2020, 2024-
- Jim Crowell – professional baseball player in Major League Baseball (MLB)
- Fred Doelling – professional football player in the National Football League (NFL)
- Bryce Drew – professional basketball player in the National Basketball Association (NBA), college basketball head coach
- Art Engstrom - professional football player in the NFL
- Sam Ficken - professional football player in the NFL
- Chad Fortune - monster truck driver, football tight end, and professional wrestler
- Carl Gioia - football placekicker
- Robbie Hummel – professional basketball player in the NBA and Lega Basket Serie A, college basketball analyst for Big Ten Network and ESPN
- Patricia Ireland – former president of the National Organization for Women (NOW) and prominent women's rights activist
- David Lebryk, former US Fiscal Assistant Secretary of the Treasury
- Joan Leitzel, former president of the University of New Hampshire
- S.S. McClure – publisher and influential person in the creation of investigative journalism
- Mike Price – jazz trumpet player
- Everett Ruess – poet and traveler
- Jeff Samardzija – professional baseball player in MLB

== See also ==
- List of high schools in Indiana
