= Fred Doelling =

American football player (born 1938)

No. 34
- Position: Safety

Personal information
- Born: September 27, 1938 (age 88); Valparaiso, Indiana, U.S.
- Listed height: 5 ft 10 in (1.78 m)
- Listed weight: 190 lb (86 kg)

Career information
- High school: Valparaiso
- College: Penn
- NFL draft: 1960: undrafted

Career history
- Dallas Cowboys (1960)

Awards and highlights
- All-Ivy (1959); All-East (1959); Second-team All-ECAC (1959); University of Pennsylvania Hall of Fame (2003)

Career NFL statistics
- Games played: 2
- Stats at Pro Football Reference

Fred Frank Doelling (born September 27, 1938, in Valparaiso, Indiana) is an American former professional football player who was a safety for the Dallas Cowboys of the National Football League (NFL). He played college football for the Penn Quakers. He was inducted into the Penn Athletics Hall of Fame as part of the 2003 class.

== Early life ==
Doelling attended Valparaiso High School. He accepted a football scholarship from the University of Pennsylvania.

He was a two-way player, who also played on special teams. Known for his speed, he was a starter and the leading team rusher in three consecutive seasons. As a sophomore, he recorded 97 carries for 511 yards and one touchdown.

As a junior, he was limited with leg injuries, recording 78 carries for 340 rushing yards and 3 touchdowns.

As a senior, he tallied 133 carries for 707 yards (5.3-yard avg.) and 7 touchdowns. He registered 3 interceptions on defense, while helping lead his school to its first-ever Ivy League title. He ended his college eligibility with school records of 1,558 rushing yards on 305 carries for an average of 5 yards per carry. He played in the Chicago College All-Star Game.

In 2003, he was inducted into the Penn Athletics Hall of Fame.

== Professional career ==
Doelling was signed as an undrafted free agent by the Dallas Cowboys after the 1960 NFL draft in May. He was a part of the franchise's inaugural season and played in 2 games (2 starts) at safety. He was waived on November 7.
