= Valpo =

Valpo may refer to:

- Valparaíso, Chile
- Valparaiso, Indiana, United States
  - Valparaiso University
  - Valparaiso Beacons, the school's athletic program
- ValPo or Valtiollinen poliisi, predecessor of the Finnish Security Intelligence Service

== See also ==
- Valparaiso (disambiguation)
