= George Ernest Foulkes =

American politician (1878–1960)

George Foulkes
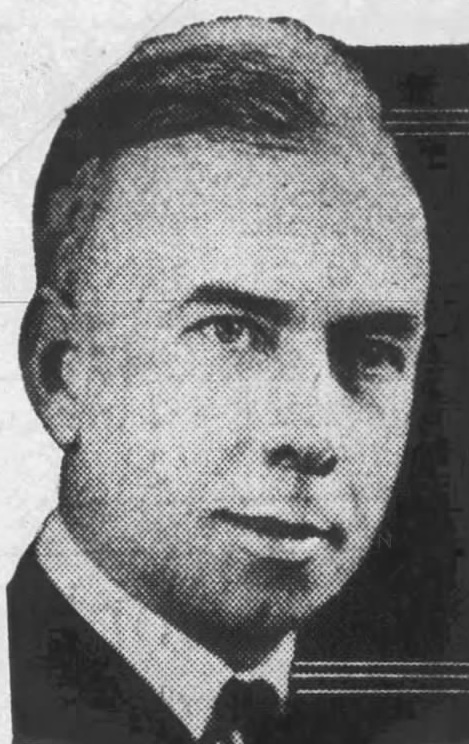

Member of the U.S. House of Representatives from Michigan's 4th district
- In office March 4, 1933 – January 3, 1935
- Preceded by: John C. Ketcham
- Succeeded by: Clare Hoffman

Personal details
- Born: George Ernest Foulkes; December 25, 1878 Chicago, Illinois, U.S.
- Died: December 13, 1960 (aged 81) Hartford, Michigan, U.S.
- Party: Democratic
- Other political affiliations: Farmer-Labor
- Education: Lake Forest College (LLB)

George Ernest Foulkes (December 25, 1878 – December 13, 1960) was a United States representative from Michigan.

Foulkes was born in Chicago and attended the public schools of Chicago. He graduated from the law department of Lake Forest University, Chicago, in 1900. He was admitted to the bar the same year and commenced practice in the United States Treasury Department. He was special agent of the U.S. Treasury Department in charge of field service at New York City, El Paso, Texas, St. Paul, Minnesota, and Minneapolis, Minnesota, 1900–19. He moved to Hartford, Michigan, in 1920 and engaged in agricultural pursuits. He was a delegate to the Democratic state conventions in 1924, 1926, and 1928.

In 1932, Foulkes defeated incumbent Republican John C. Ketcham to be elected as a Democrat from Michigan's 4th congressional district to the United States House of Representatives for the 73rd Congress, serving from March 4, 1933, to January 3, 1935. He was nominated for Governor of Michigan by the Farmer–Labor Party in 1934, but declined. He was an unsuccessful candidate for reelection in 1934 to the 74th Congress.

In 1935, Foulkes was convicted of receiving illegal political contributions from postmasters and sentenced to eighteen months in prison and to pay $1,000 fine.

He resumed agricultural pursuits and engaged as an author and in farm-organization work. He died in Hartford and is interred in Hartford Cemetery.

U.S. House of Representatives
Preceded by John C. Ketcham	Member of the U.S. House of Representatives from Michigan's 4th congressional district 1933–1935	Succeeded by Clare Hoffman
