= Edward L. Hamilton =

American politician (1857–1923)

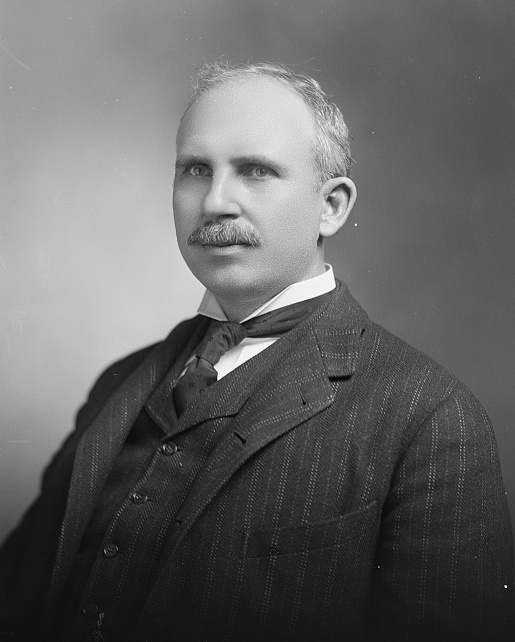
- Hamilton, 1905–1906

Member of the U.S. House of Representatives from Michigan's 4th district
- In office March 4, 1897 – March 3, 1921
- Preceded by: Henry F. Thomas
- Succeeded by: John C. Ketcham

Personal details
- Born: December 9, 1857 Niles Township, Michigan, U.S.
- Died: November 2, 1923 (aged 65) St. Joseph, Michigan, U.S.
- Party: Republican

Edward La Rue Hamilton (December 9, 1857 – November 2, 1923) was a politician from the U.S. state of Michigan.

Hamilton was born in Niles Township, Michigan, where he attended grade school and graduated from the Niles High School in 1876. He studied law, was admitted to the bar in 1884, and commenced practice in Niles, Michigan.

Hamilton was elected as a Republican from Michigan's 4th congressional district to the 55th United States Congress and subsequently re-elected to the eleven succeeding Congresses, serving from March 4, 1897 to March 3, 1921. He was chairman of the Committee on Territories in the 58th through 61st Congresses. He was not a candidate for renomination in 1920.

He engaged in the practice of law until his death in St. Joseph, Michigan in 1923. He was interred in Silverbrook Cemetery in Niles, Michigan.

U.S. House of Representatives
Preceded by Henry F. Thomas	United States Representative for the 4th congressional district of Michigan; 1897 – 1921	Succeeded by John C. Ketcham
