= Julius C. Burrows =

American politician (1837–1915)

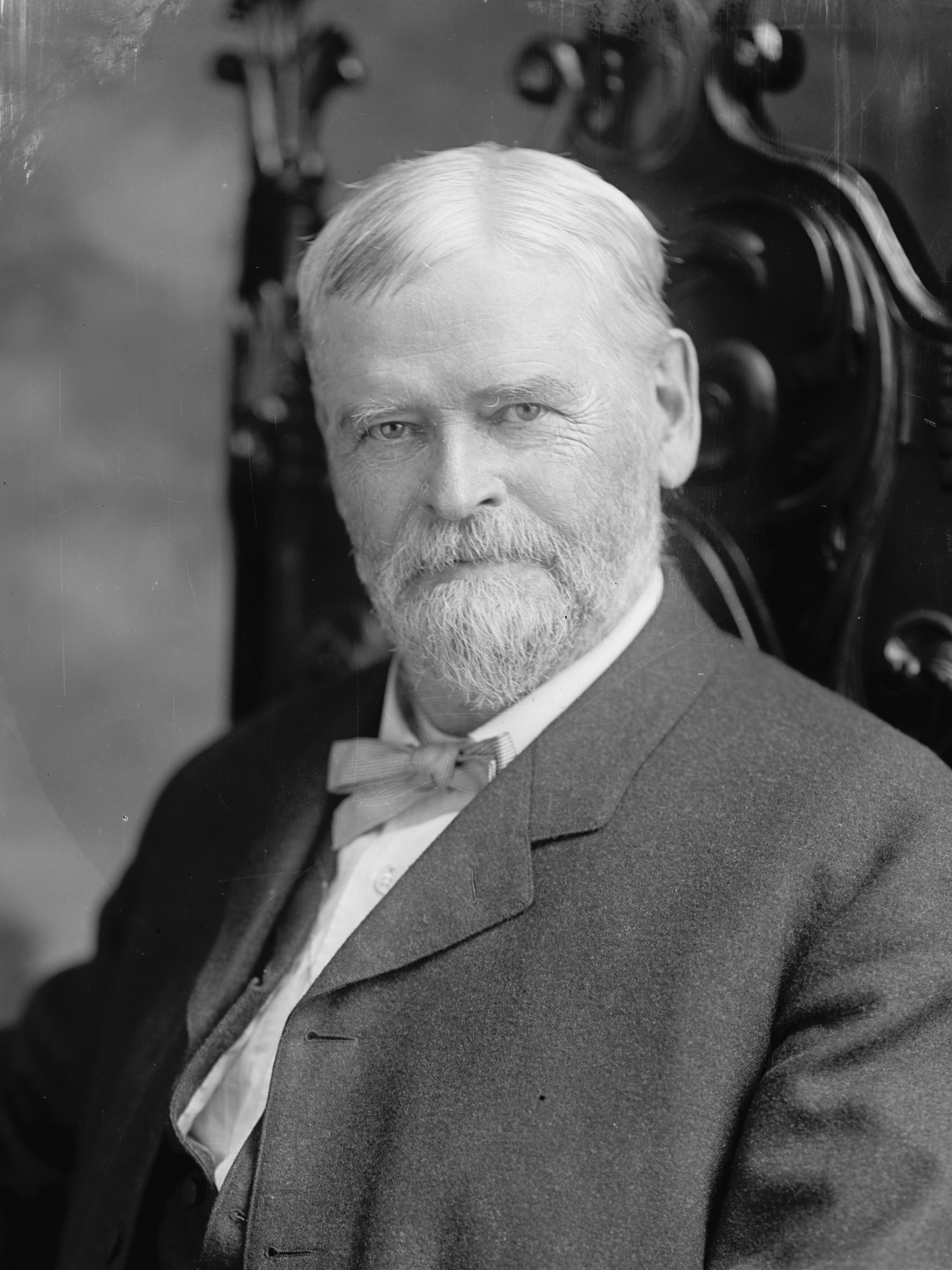

United States Senator from Michigan
- In office January 24, 1895 – March 3, 1911
- Preceded by: John Patton, Jr.
- Succeeded by: Charles E. Townsend

Member of the U.S. House of Representatives from Michigan
- In office March 4, 1873 – March 3, 1875
- Preceded by: Wilder D. Foster
- Succeeded by: Allen Potter
- Constituency: 4th district
- In office March 4, 1879 – March 3, 1883
- Preceded by: Edwin W. Keightley
- Succeeded by: George L. Yaple
- Constituency: 4th district
- In office March 4, 1885 – January 23, 1895
- Preceded by: George L. Yaple
- Succeeded by: Alfred Milnes
- Constituency: 4th district (1885–93); 3rd district (1893–95)

Personal details
- Born: January 9, 1837 North East, Pennsylvania
- Died: November 16, 1915 (aged 78) Kalamazoo, Michigan
- Party: Republican
- Profession: Lawyer

Julius Caesar Burrows (January 9, 1837 – November 16, 1915) was an American politician who served as a U.S. representative and a U.S. senator from Michigan.

== Early life and education ==
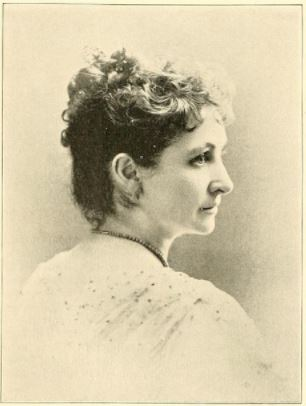
Mrs Julius C. Burrows

Burrows was born in North East, Pennsylvania, and moved then with his parents to Ashtabula County, Ohio. He attended district school, Kingsville Academy, and Grand River Institute in Austinburg, Ohio. 1853 - 1854 found him teaching at the Madison Seminary. He studied law and was admitted to the bar at Jefferson, Ohio, in 1859. He moved to Richland, Michigan, in 1860. He was principal of the Richland Seminary and commenced the practice of law in nearby Kalamazoo in 1861.

== Military and legal careers ==
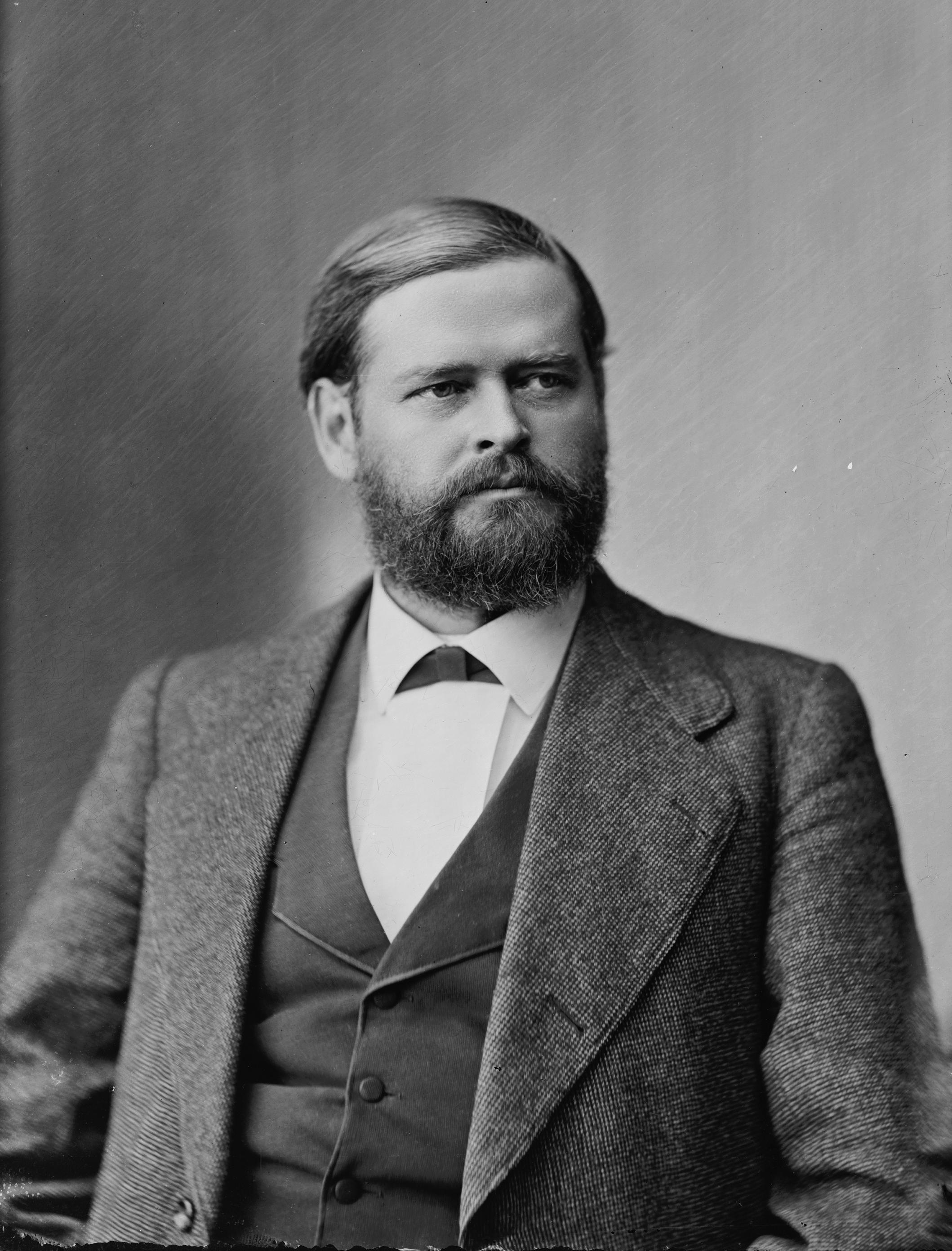
Julius C. Burrows as a younger congressman

Burrows raised an infantry company in 1862 to fight in the American Civil War, becoming a part of the 17th Michigan Infantry Regiment and serving as its captain until the fall of 1863. He was elected circuit court commissioner in 1864 and was prosecuting attorney for Kalamazoo County 1866-1870. He declined appointment as supervisor of internal revenue for Michigan and Wisconsin in 1868.

== Political life ==
In 1872, Burrows was elected as a Republican from Michigan's 4th congressional district to the U.S. House of Representatives for the 43rd Congress, serving from March 4, 1873, to March 3, 1875. He was chairman of the Committee on Expenditures in the Department of the Navy.

Burrows was an unsuccessful candidate for reelection in 1874, but was subsequently elected to the 46th and 47th Congresses, serving from March 4, 1879, to March 3, 1883. He was chairman of the Committee on Territories in the 47th Congress.

Burrows is sometimes cited as a contributing factor in why New Mexico was delayed in achieving statehood. In an 1876 debate, Burrows, an admired orator, spoke forcefully in favor of a bill intended to protect the civil rights of freed black slaves. Stephen B. Elkins, the New Mexico Territory Delegate to Congress, arrived late, just as Burrows was finishing. Unaware of the full import of Burrows' speech, Elkins shook his colleague's hand in congratulations, a gesture that many southern congressmen interpreted as support for the civil rights legislation. As a result, Elkin's handshake with Burrows is blamed for costing New Mexico several Southern Democratic votes which had been needed to achieve statehood. While Colorado achieved statehood in 1876, New Mexico remained a territory for another 36 years.

Burrows was an unsuccessful candidate for reelection in 1882. He won re-election in 1884 to the 49th Congress, and subsequently to the five succeeding Congresses. He represented Michigan's 4th district from March 4, 1885, until March 3, 1893, and the 3rd district from March 4, 1893, until his resignation on January 23, 1895, having been elected U.S. Senator. He was chairman of the Committee on Levees and Improvements of Mississippi River in the 51st Congress.

Burrows was elected as a Republican to the United States Senate to fill the vacancy caused by the death of Francis B. Stockbridge and was reelected in 1899 and 1905, serving from January 24, 1895, to March 3, 1911.

He was an unsuccessful candidate for renomination in 1910. He was chairman of the Committee on Revision of the Laws of the United States in the 54th through 56th Congresses and of the Committee on Privileges and Elections in the 57th through 61st Congresses. He also served on the Lodge Committee which investigated war crimes in the Philippine–American War. He was on the imperialist faction led by Henry Cabot Lodge in support of the Philippine–American War. He was also a member of the National Monetary Commission and its vice chairman 1908-1912.

After this, Burrows retired from active business pursuits and political life. He died in Kalamazoo and is interred in Mountain Home Cemetery there.

== Bibliography ==
- American National Biography
- Dictionary of American Biography
- Holsinger, M. Paul. "J.C. Burrows and the Fight Against Mormonism from 1903 to 1907." Michigan History 52 (Fall 1968): 181-95
- Orcutt, Dana. Burrows of Michigan and the Republican Party. New York: Longmans, Green and Company, 1917. vols I & II

== Footnotes ==
U.S. House of Representatives
Preceded by Wilder D. Foster	United States Representative for the 4th congressional district of Michigan; 1873–1875	Succeeded by Allen Potter
Preceded by Edwin W. Keightley	United States Representative for the 4th congressional district of Michigan; 1879–1883	Succeeded by George L. Yaple
Preceded by George L. Yaple	United States Representative for the 4th congressional district of Michigan; 1885–1893	Succeeded by Henry F. Thomas
Preceded by James O'Donnell	United States Representative for the 3rd congressional district of Michigan; 1893–1895	Succeeded by Alfred Milnes
U.S. Senate
Preceded by John Patton, Jr.	U.S. Senator (Class 1) from Michigan; 1895–1911	Succeeded by Charles E. Townsend
