= Don Cooney =

American politician

Kalamazoo City Commissioner
- In office 1997–2019

Personal details
- Born: 1936 or 1937 (age 88–89) Philadelphia, Pennsylvania; United States
- Spouse: Kathleen Cooney
- Children: Nathaniel Hoffman
- Education: Mary Immaculate Seminary (Bachelor of Arts and Master of Divinity), Fordham University (MA), Bryn Mawr College (Ph.D.)
- Occupation: Professor in the School of Social Work at Western Michigan University

Donald F. Cooney is a professor and former elected official. He was a Kalamazoo City Commissioner from 1997 to 2019 and from 2021 to 2025. He is a professor at Western Michigan University's School of Social Work.

== Early life and education ==
Cooney was born in 1936 or 1937 in Philadelphia. At the age of 14, he joined a seminary in New Jersey. After being ordained as a minister, he went to Brooklyn in 1964, where he taught high school. He volunteered for Operation Breadbasket to promote economic opportunities for African Americans.

He received a bachelor's degree and a Master of Divinity degree from Mary Immaculate Seminary, and a master's degree from Fordham University.

Cooney received a PhD from Bryn Mawr College. He later taught there and was a community organizer in the area.

In 1997, Cooney moved to Kalamazoo to teach at Western Michigan University (WMU). He helped found the South Africa Solidarity Organization and persuaded WMU to be the sixth university in the country to divest from South Africa to protest apartheid.

Cooney unsuccessfully ran for Kalamazoo City Commission in 1981 and 1983.

== Kalamazoo commissioner ==
Cooney was first elected to the Kalamazoo City Commission in 1997. He served from 1997 until he chose not to run in 2019. In 2021, he ran again and served two terms until 2025.

== 2008 Congressional elections ==
Cooney filed for the August 5, 2008, Democratic primary election for the United States Representative of Michigan's 6th congressional district on May 12, 2008, in which he was unopposed. He faced Republican Fred Upton in the November 4, 2008 general election.

Cooney's campaign largely focused on differences in economic and energy policy with Upton during the campaign, calling for a new, New Deal to rebuild America's human and physical infrastructure. He has also been a vocal critic of the war in Iraq. Cooney has large popularity in Kalamazoo.

== 2010 Congressional elections ==
Cooney was the Democratic nominee for the United States Representative of Michigan's 6th congressional district in 2010 as well, stressing similar themes as in his 2008 run.
