= Allen Potter =

American politician (1818–1885)

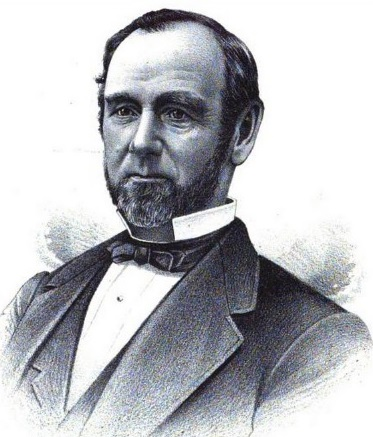
- From 1892's Portrait and Biographical Record of Kalamazoo, Allegan and Van Buren Counties, Michigan

Member of the U.S. House of Representatives from Michigan's 4th district
- In office March 4, 1875 – March 3, 1877
- Preceded by: Julius C. Burrows
- Succeeded by: Edwin W. Keightley

Personal details
- Born: October 2, 1818 Galway, New York, U.S.
- Died: May 8, 1885 (aged 66)
- Party: Democratic

Allen Potter (October 2, 1818 – May 8, 1885) was a politician from the U.S. state of Michigan.

Potter was born in Galloway (now Galway, New York) and attended the common schools. He moved to Adrian, Michigan, in 1830 and to Jonesville, Michigan, in 1838 where he learned the trade of tinsmith. He moved to Kalamazoo in 1845 and engaged in the retail hardware business until 1858, when he engaged in banking and in the manufacture of gas.

Potter was a member of the Michigan House of Representatives in 1857. He also served as president of the village council in 1859, 1863, 1870, and again in 1872. He was elected a member of the board of education in 1867, 1869, and 1871, serving as president in 1869. He was also a member of the board of water commissioners in 1872 and an unsuccessful Liberal Republican candidate for election to the 43rd United States Congress that same year.

Potter was elected as a Democrat from Michigan's 4th congressional district to the 44th Congress, serving from March 4, 1875, to March 3, 1877. He was not a candidate for reelection in 1876 and resumed banking activities as well as being financially interested in railroads and Colorado mining enterprises.

Allen Potter served as member of the sewer commission from 1880 to 1883 and was elected as the first mayor of Kalamazoo in 1884. He also served as treasurer of the State asylum for the insane. He died in Kalamazoo and is interred there in the City Cemetery.

U.S. House of Representatives
Preceded by Julius C. Burrows	United States Representative for the 4th congressional district of Michigan; 1875 – 1877	Succeeded by Edwin W. Keightley
