= Henry F. Thomas =

American physician and politician (1843–1912)

Henry Franklin Thomas
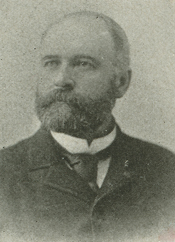

Member of the U.S. House of Representatives from Michigan's 4th district
- In office March 4, 1893 – March 3, 1897
- Preceded by: Julius C. Burrows
- Succeeded by: Edward L. Hamilton

Member of the Michigan Senate from the 14th district
- In office 1875–1876
- Preceded by: Mark D. Wilber
- Succeeded by: Wilson C. Edsell

Member of the Michigan House of Representatives from the Allegan County 1st district
- In office 1873–1874
- Preceded by: Richard Ferris
- Succeeded by: James Eggleston

Personal details
- Born: December 17, 1843 Tompkins Township, Michigan
- Died: April 16, 1912 (aged 68) Allegan, Michigan
- Party: Republican
- Education: Albion College; Ypsilanti Normal School; University of Michigan
- Occupation: Physician

Henry Franklin Thomas (December 17, 1843 – April 16, 1912) was an American physician and politician from the U.S. state of Michigan. He served two terms in the United States House of Representatives from 1893 to 1897

== Early life and education ==
Thomas was born in Tompkins Township, Michigan and attended the common schools and Albion College of Albion, Michigan in 1859. He enlisted in 1862 during the American Civil War as a private in the Seventh Regiment, Michigan Volunteer Cavalry. He was promoted to first sergeant of Company D, and in July 1864 to second lieutenant. He renewed his studies in the Ypsilanti Normal School, (now Eastern Michigan University) and graduated from the medical department of University of Michigan at Ann Arbor in 1868 and commenced practice in Constantine. In 1870, he moved to Allegan, Michigan.

== Political career ==
Thomas served as a member of the Michigan House of Representatives from Allegan County's 1st district in 1873 and 1874 and then served in the Michigan Senate, 14th district, in 1875 and 1876. He was a delegate to the Republican National Convention in 1884. Eight years later, he was elected as a Republican from Michigan's 4th congressional district to the 53rd United States Congress. He was reelected to the 54th Congress, serving from March 4, 1893 to March 3, 1897. He served as chairman of the Committee on Expenditures in the Department of the Navy in the 54th Congress. He was an unsuccessful candidate for re-nomination in 1896.

== After Congress ==
Henry F. Thomas became a surgeon in the Michigan Soldiers' Home in 1907 and 1908 and a member of the Michigan pardon board in 1909 and 1910. He died in Allegan and is interred in Oak Hill Cemetery in Ann Arbor.

U.S. House of Representatives
Preceded by Julius C. Burrows	United States Representative for the 4th congressional district of Michigan; March 4, 1893 – March 3, 1897	Succeeded by Edward L. Hamilton
