= 2008 United States House of Representatives elections in Michigan =

- November 4, 2008

All 15 Michigan seats to the United States House of Representatives
| | Majority party | Minority party |
|---|---|---|
| Party | Democratic | Republican |
| Last election | 6 | 9 |
| Seats won | 8 | 7 |
| Seat change | ▲2 | ▼2 |
| Popular vote | 2,516,640 | 2,114,293 |
| Percentage | 52.31% | 43.95% |
| Swing | ▼0.44% | ▼0.61% |

Democratic
40–50%
50–60%
60–70%
70–80%
>90%
Republican
40–50%
50–60%
60–70%
70–80%

The 2008 congressional elections in Michigan were held on November 4, 2008, to determine who would represent the state of Michigan in the United States House of Representatives. Michigan had fifteen seats in the House, apportioned according to the 2000 United States census. Representatives are elected for two-year terms; those elected will serve in the 111th Congress from January 3, 2009, until January 3, 2011. The election coincided with the 2008 U.S. presidential election.

The 7th and 9th district seats were considered to be competitive. Both seats were occupied by Republicans who lost to Democratic opponents.

The makeup of the Michigan congressional delegation in 2008 consisted of nine Republicans and six Democrats. As a result of the 2008 election, the delegation in 2009/2010 consists of eight Democrats and seven Republicans. The two Democratic Party gains came in the 7th and 9th districts.

== Overview ==
United States House of Representatives elections in Michigan, 2008
| Party | Votes | Percentage | Seats | +/– |
|---|---|---|---|---|
| Democratic | 2,516,640 | 52.31% | 8 | +2 |
| Republican | 2,114,293 | 43.95% | 7 | -2 |
| Libertarian | 83,424 | 1.73% | 0 | - |
| Green | 66,162 | 1.38% | 0 | - |
| U.S. Taxpayers | 21,057 | 0.44% | 0 | - |
| Independents | 8,987 | 0.19% | 0 | — |
| Write-ins | 127 | 0.00% | 0 | — |
| Totals | 4,810,690 | 100.00% | 15 | — |

== District 1 ==
2008 Michigan's 1st congressional district election
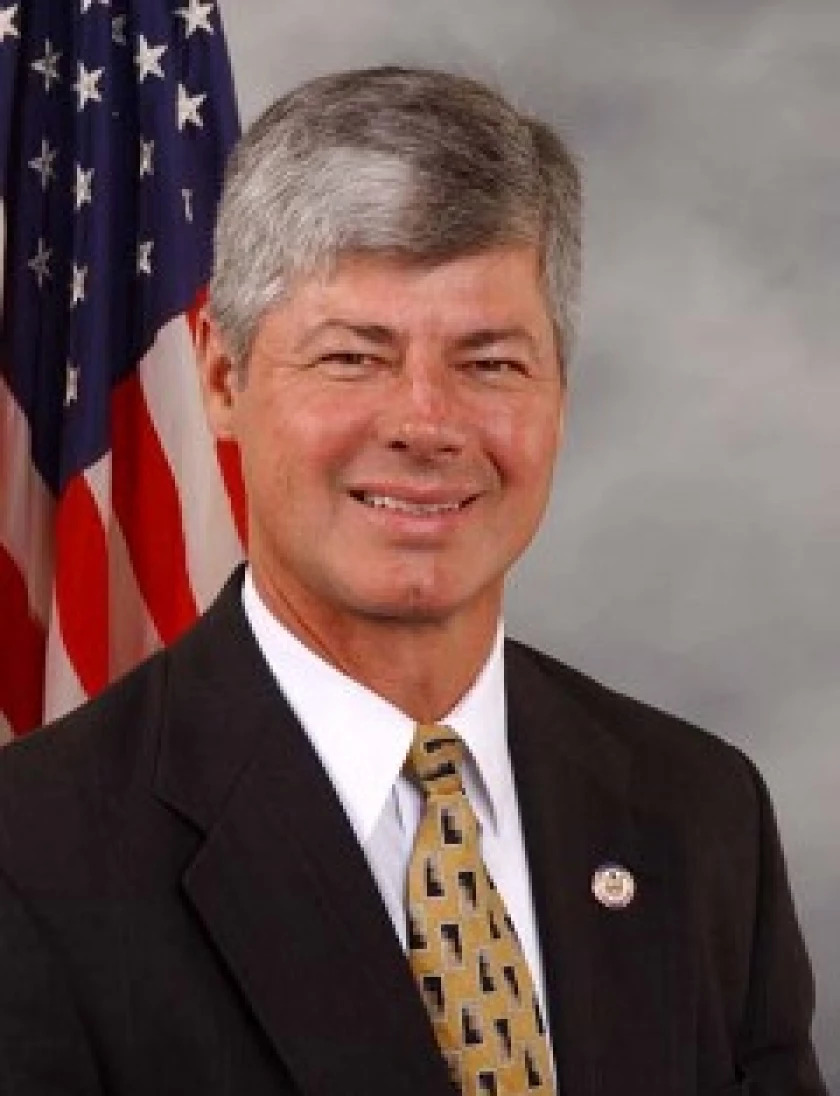

| Nominee | Bart Stupak | Tom Casperson |
| Party | Democratic | Republican |
| Popular vote | 213,216 | 107,340 |
| Percentage | 65.0% | 32.7% |
- County results Stupak 50–60% 60–70% 70–80%
U.S. Representative before election
Bart Stupak
Democratic
Elected U.S. Representative
Bart Stupak
Democratic

Popular incumbent Bart Stupak was unopposed in the Democratic primary. Conservative state Representative Tom Casperson, from Escanaba, won the Republican primary election over Linda Goldthorpe and Don Hooper. The Libertarian Party nominated Daniel Grow; the U.S. Taxpayers Party nominated Joshua Warren and the Green Party nominated Socialist Jean Treacy. The 1st District is generally socially conservative and strongly pro-union. It covers the entire Upper Peninsula and the northern part of the Lower Peninsula, and is the largest congressional district east of the Mississippi River.

=== Predictions ===
| Source | Ranking | As of |
|---|---|---|
| The Cook Political Report | Safe D | November 6, 2008 |
| Rothenberg | Safe D | November 2, 2008 |
| Sabato's Crystal Ball | Safe D | November 6, 2008 |
| Real Clear Politics | Safe D | November 7, 2008 |
| CQ Politics | Safe D | November 6, 2008 |

Michigan's 1st congressional district election, 2008
| Party | Candidate | Votes | % |
|---|---|---|---|
| Democratic | Bart Stupak (inc.) | 213,216 | 65.04 |
| Republican | Tom Casperson | 107,340 | 32.74 |
| Green | Jean Treacy | 2,669 | 0.81 |
| Libertarian | Daniel W. Grow | 2,533 | 0.77 |
| Constitution | Joshua J. Warren | 2,070 | 0.63 |
| Total votes | | 327,836 | 100.00 |
| Democratic hold | | | |

== District 2 ==
2008 Michigan's 2nd congressional district election

| Nominee | Pete Hoekstra | Fred Johnson |
| Party | Republican | Democratic |
| Popular vote | 214,100 | 119,506 |
| Percentage | 62.4% | 34.8% |
- County Results; Hoekstra: 50–60% 60–70% 70–80% Johnson: 50–60%
U.S. Representative before election
Pete Hoekstra (inc.)
Republican
Elected U.S. Representative
Pete Hoekstra
Republican

Pete Hoekstra, a conservative incumbent and ranking Republican on the House Intelligence Committee, was challenged by Democrat Fred Johnson, Libertarian Dan Johnson (campaign website) and U.S. Taxpayers Party candidate Ronald Graeser. The district is centered on Michigan's West Shoreline and includes the cities of Muskegon and Holland.

=== Predictions ===
| Source | Ranking | As of |
|---|---|---|
| The Cook Political Report | Safe R | November 6, 2008 |
| Rothenberg | Safe R | November 2, 2008 |
| Sabato's Crystal Ball | Safe R | November 6, 2008 |
| Real Clear Politics | Safe R | November 7, 2008 |
| CQ Politics | Safe R | November 6, 2008 |

Michigan's 2nd congressional district election, 2008
| Party | Candidate | Votes | % |
|---|---|---|---|
| Republican | Pete Hoekstra (inc.) | 214,100 | 62.36 |
| Democratic | Fred Johnson | 119,506 | 34.81 |
| Libertarian | Dan Johnson | 5,496 | 1.60 |
| Constitution | Ronald E. Graeser | 4,200 | 1.22 |
| Total votes | | 343,309 | 100.00 |
| Republican hold | | | |

== District 3 ==
2008 Michigan's 3rd congressional district election
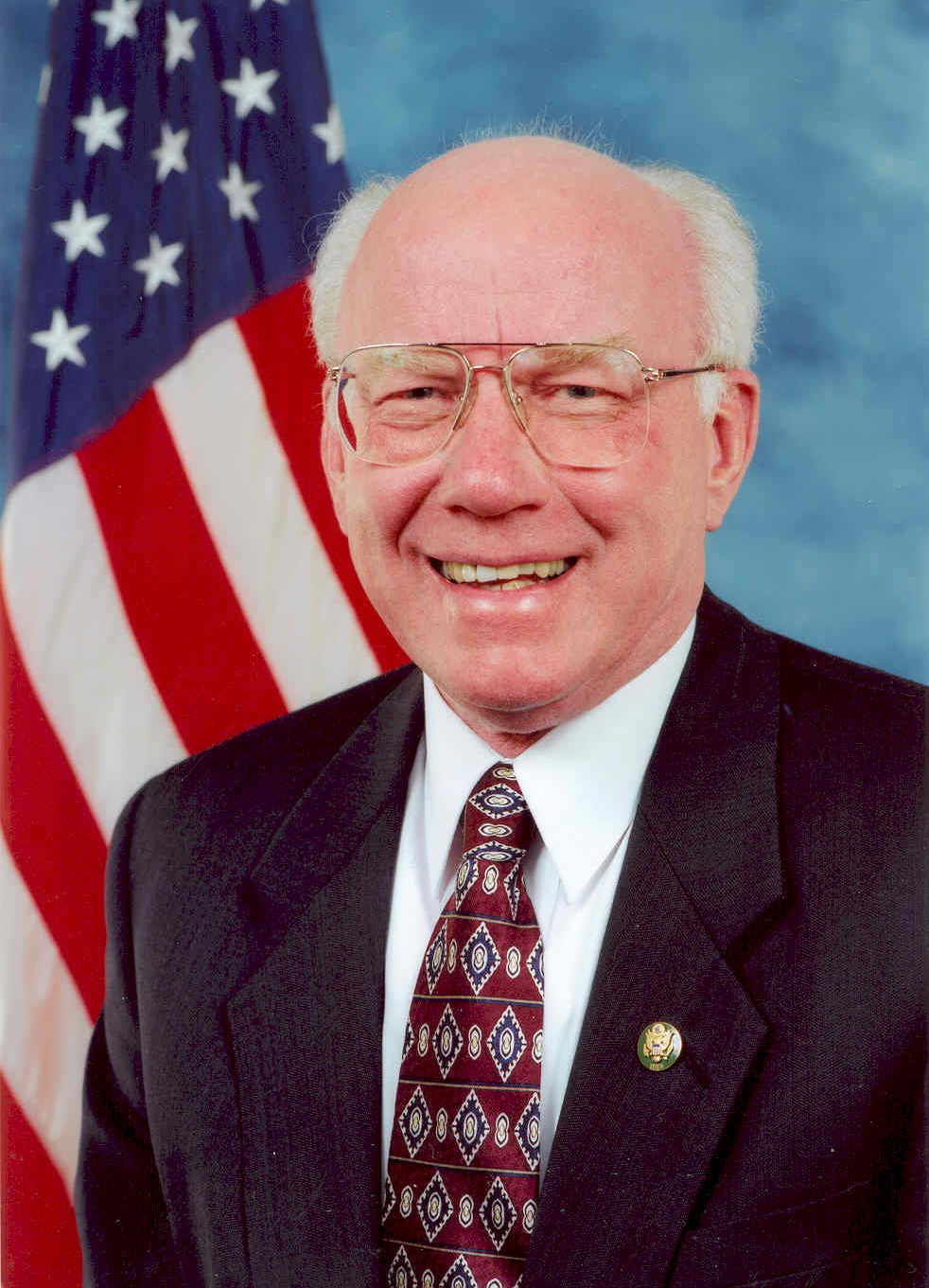

| Nominee | Vern Ehlers | Henry Sanchez |
| Party | Republican | Democratic |
| Popular vote | 203,799 | 117,961 |
| Percentage | 61.1% | 35.4% |
- County Results; Ehlers: 60–70%
U.S. Representative before election
Vern Ehlers (inc.)
Republican
Elected U.S. Representative
Vern Ehlers
Republican

Incumbent Vern Ehlers was re-elected. The district trends Republican and is centered on Grand Rapids. Ehlers was challenged by Democrat Henry Sanchez and Libertarian Erwin Haas.

=== Predictions ===
| Source | Ranking | As of |
|---|---|---|
| The Cook Political Report | Safe R | November 6, 2008 |
| Rothenberg | Safe R | November 2, 2008 |
| Sabato's Crystal Ball | Safe R | November 6, 2008 |
| Real Clear Politics | Safe R | November 7, 2008 |
| CQ Politics | Safe R | November 6, 2008 |

Michigan's 3rd congressional district election, 2008
| Party | Candidate | Votes | % |
|---|---|---|---|
| Republican | Vern Ehlers (inc.) | 203,799 | 61.11 |
| Democratic | Henry Sanchez | 117,961 | 35.37 |
| Libertarian | Erwin J. Haas | 11,758 | 3.53 |
| Total votes | | 333,518 | 100.00 |
| Republican hold | | | |

== District 4 ==
2008 Michigan's 4th congressional district election
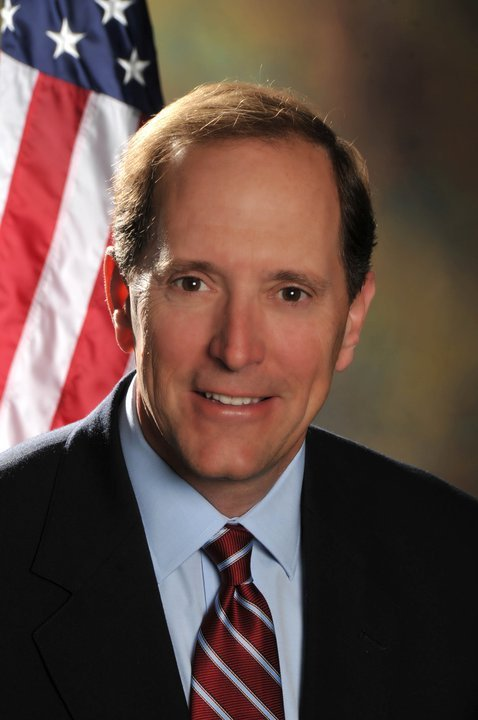

| Nominee | Dave Camp | Andrew D. Concannon |
| Party | Republican | Democratic |
| Popular vote | 204,259 | 117,665 |
| Percentage | 61.9% | 35.7% |
- County Results; Camp: 50–60% 60–70% 70–80%
U.S. Representative before election
Dave Camp (inc.)
Republican
Elected U.S. Representative
Dave Camp
Republican

Republican David Lee Camp was reelected. He was by challenged by Democrat Andrew Concannon, Libertarian Allitta Hren, and U.S. Taxpayer Party candidate John Emerick. This large district stretches from Owosso in the east central part of the state to Traverse City to the extreme northwest part of the Lower Peninsula.

=== Predictions ===
| Source | Ranking | As of |
|---|---|---|
| The Cook Political Report | Safe R | November 6, 2008 |
| Rothenberg | Safe R | November 2, 2008 |
| Sabato's Crystal Ball | Safe R | November 6, 2008 |
| Real Clear Politics | Safe R | November 7, 2008 |
| CQ Politics | Safe R | November 6, 2008 |

Michigan's 4th congressional district election, 2008
| Party | Candidate | Votes | % |
|---|---|---|---|
| Republican | Dave Camp (inc.) | 204,259 | 61.94 |
| Democratic | Andrew D. Concannon | 117,665 | 35.68 |
| Constitution | John Emerick | 4,055 | 1.23 |
| Libertarian | Allitta Hren | 3,785 | 1.15 |
| Total votes | | 329,764 | 100.00 |
| Republican hold | | | |

== District 5 ==
2008 Michigan's 5th congressional district election
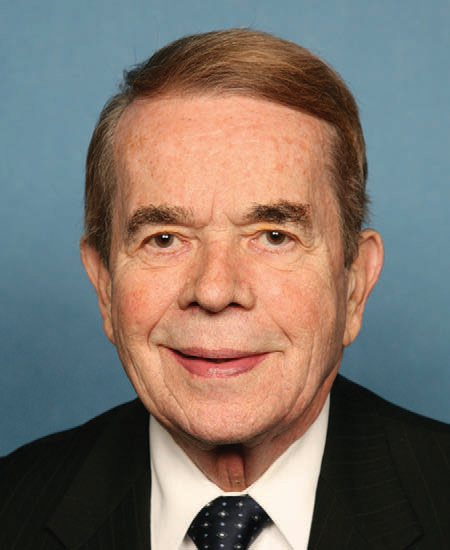

| Nominee | Dale Kildee | Matt Sawicki |
| Party | Democratic | Republican |
| Popular vote | 221,841 | 85,017 |
| Percentage | 70.4% | 27.0% |
- County results Kildee: 50–60% 60–70% 70–80%
U.S. Representative before election
Dale Kildee (inc.)
Democratic
Elected U.S. Representative
Dale Kildee
Democratic

Democrat Dale Kildee ran for re-election in 2008. The Flint area congressman has served for over 30 years. His district (covering Flint, Saginaw, Bay City and part of the western part of The Thumb) is strongly Democratic. Petitions were circulated for Democratic state senator John Gleason to challenge Kildee, but Gleason decided not to run. Kildee is challenged on by Republican candidate by Matt Sawicki of Bay City, Libertarian candidate Leonard Schwartz and Green Party candidate Ken Mathenia of Grand Blanc.

=== Predictions ===
| Source | Ranking | As of |
|---|---|---|
| The Cook Political Report | Safe D | November 6, 2008 |
| Rothenberg | Safe D | November 2, 2008 |
| Sabato's Crystal Ball | Safe D | November 6, 2008 |
| Real Clear Politics | Safe D | November 7, 2008 |
| CQ Politics | Safe D | November 6, 2008 |

Michigan's 5th congressional district election, 2008
| Party | Candidate | Votes | % |
|---|---|---|---|
| Democratic | Dale Kildee (inc.) | 221,841 | 70.36 |
| Republican | Matt Sawicki | 85,017 | 26.96 |
| Libertarian | Leonard Schwartz | 4,293 | 1.36 |
| Green | Ken Mathenia | 4,144 | 1.31 |
| Total votes | | 315,295 | 100.00 |
| Democratic hold | | | |

== District 6 ==
2008 Michigan's 6th congressional district election
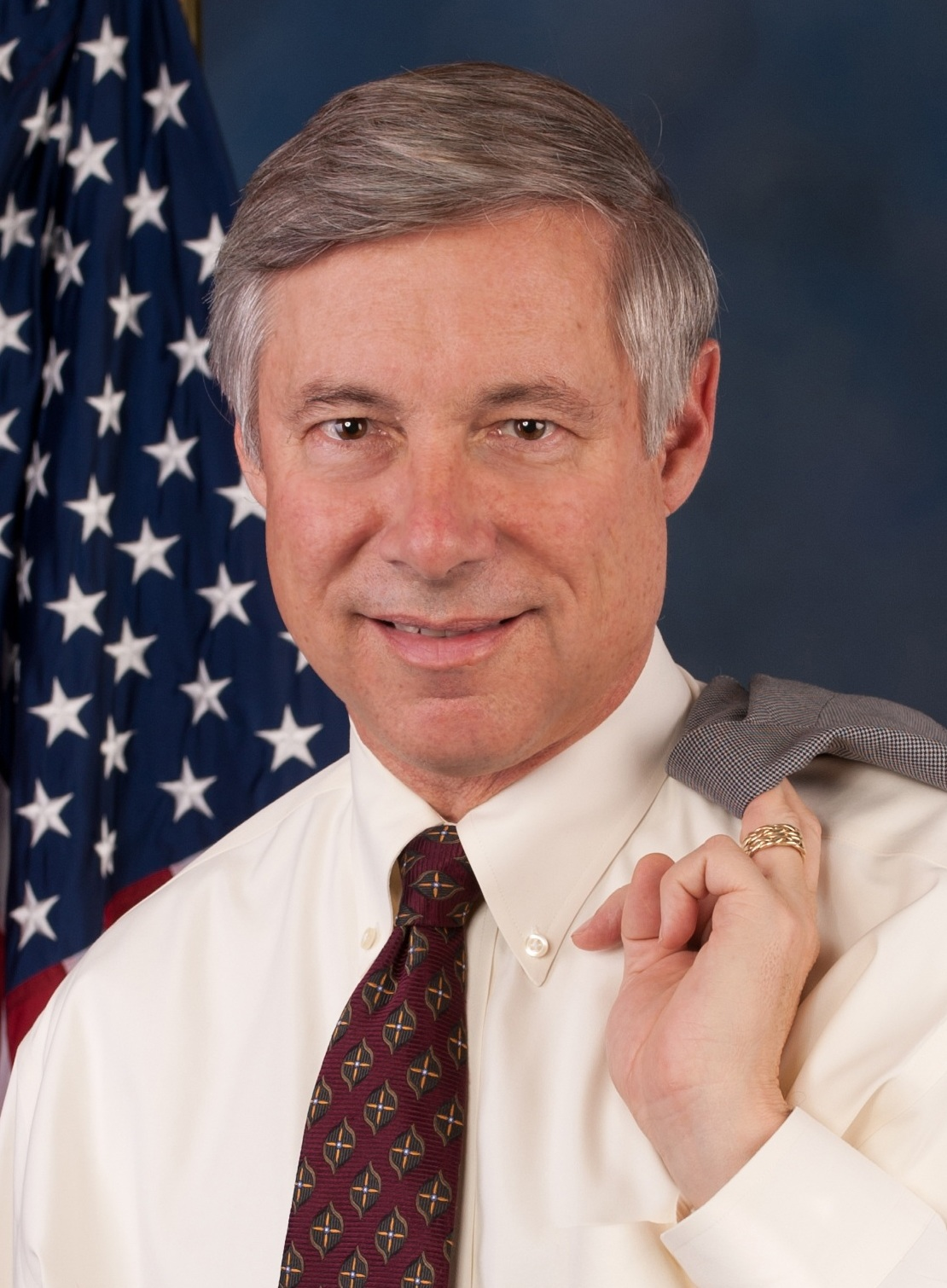

| Nominee | Fred Upton | Don Cooney |
| Party | Republican | Democratic |
| Popular vote | 188,157 | 123,257 |
| Percentage | 58.9% | 38.6% |
- County Results; Upton: 50–60% 60–70% 70–80%
U.S. Representative before election
Fred Upton (inc.)
Republican
Elected U.S. Representative
Fred Upton
Republican

Republican Fred Upton had three opponents, Democrat Don Cooney, Green Edward Pinkney and Libertarian Greg Merle. The sixth district covers the southwest corner of lower Michigan.

=== Predictions ===
| Source | Ranking | As of |
|---|---|---|
| The Cook Political Report | Safe R | November 6, 2008 |
| Rothenberg | Safe R | November 2, 2008 |
| Sabato's Crystal Ball | Safe R | November 6, 2008 |
| Real Clear Politics | Safe R | November 7, 2008 |
| CQ Politics | Safe R | November 6, 2008 |

Michigan's 6th congressional district election, 2008
| Party | Candidate | Votes | % |
|---|---|---|---|
| Republican | Fred Upton (inc.) | 188,157 | 58.86 |
| Democratic | Don Cooney | 123,257 | 38.56 |
| Libertarian | Greg Merle | 4,720 | 1.48 |
| Green | Edward Pinkney | 3,512 | 1.10 |
| Total votes | | 319,646 | 100.00 |
| Republican hold | | | |

== District 7 ==
2008 Michigan's 7th congressional district election
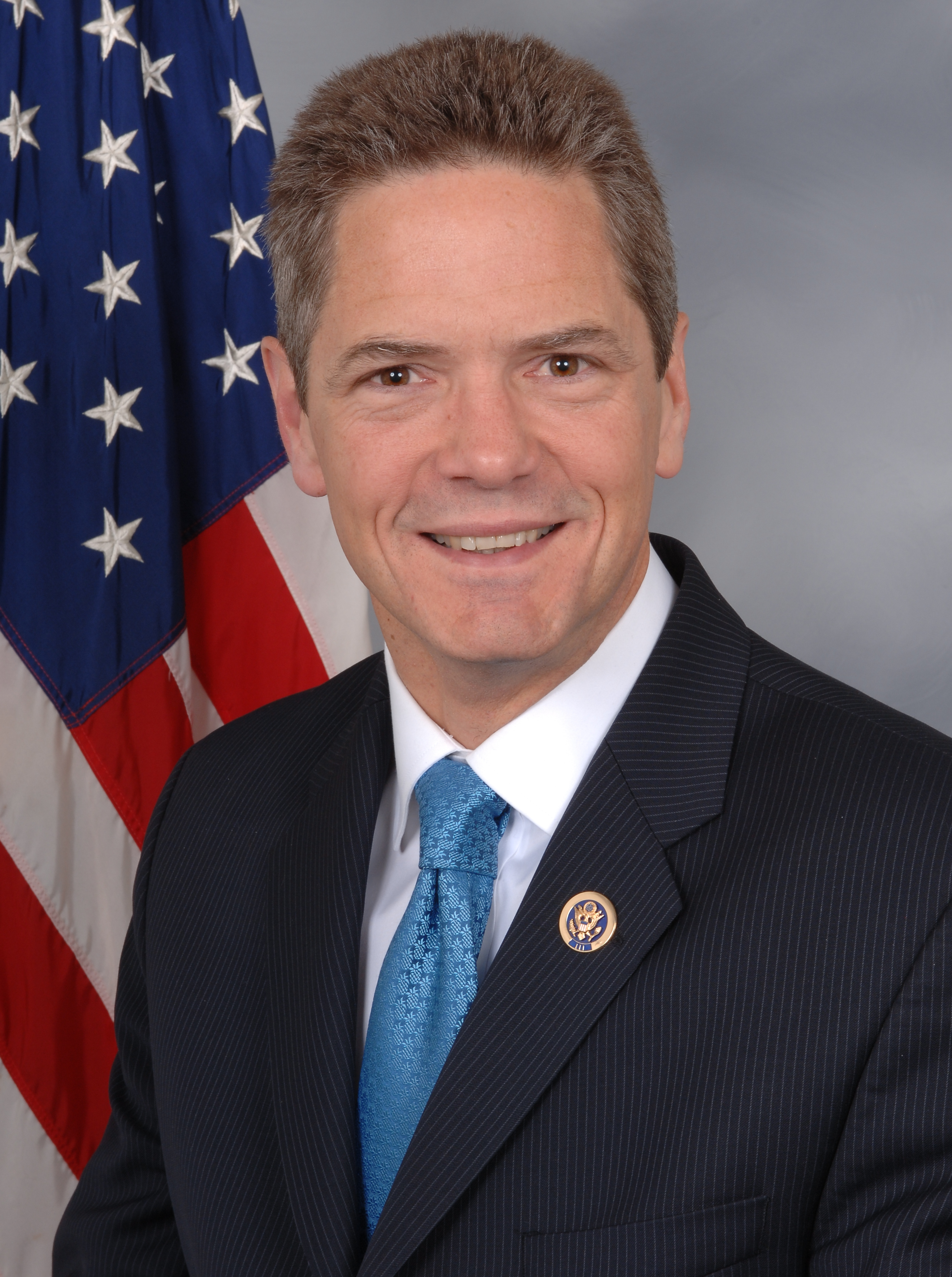

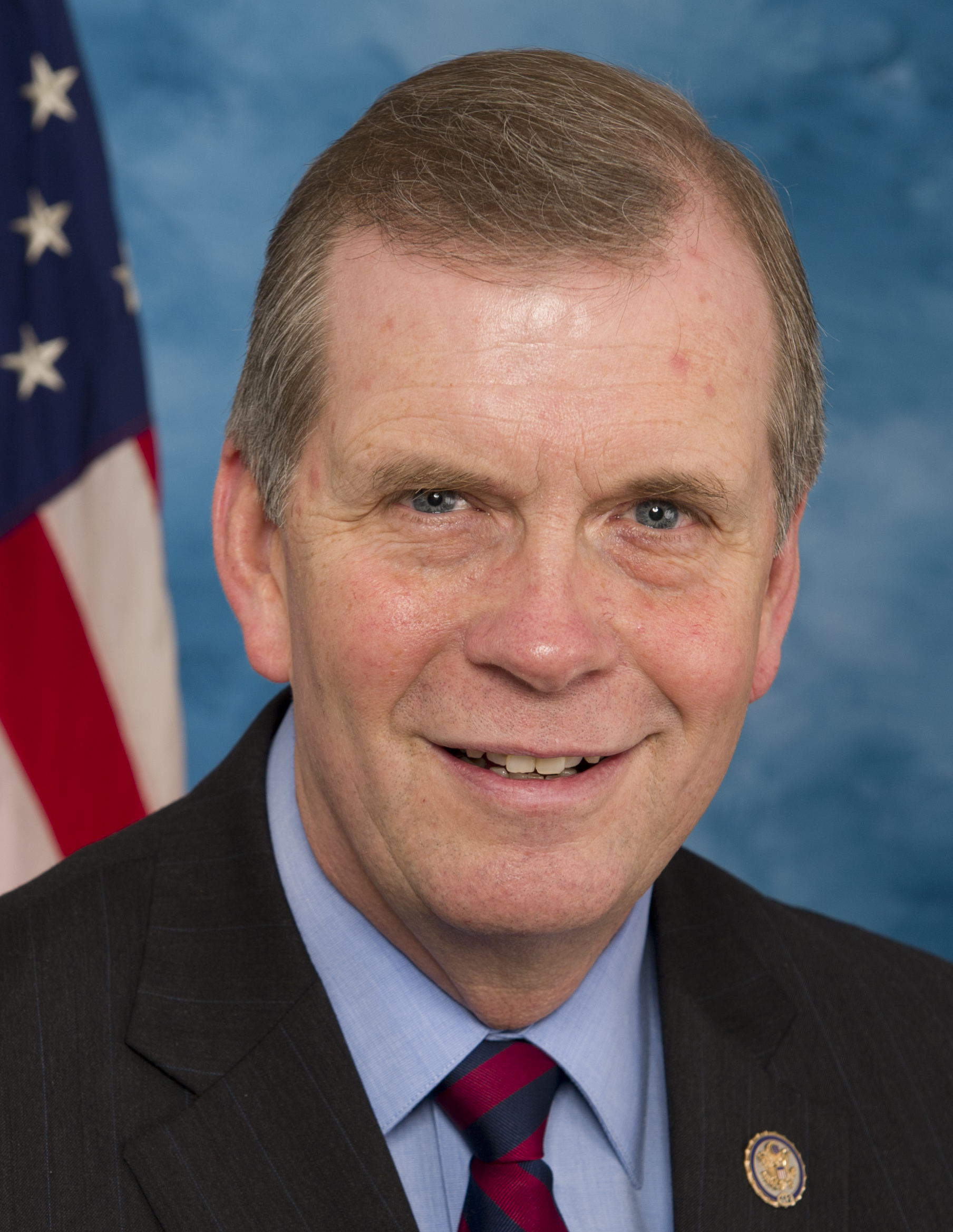
| Nominee | Mark Schauer | Tim Walberg |
| Party | Democratic | Republican |
| Popular vote | 157,213 | 149,781 |
| Percentage | 48.8% | 46.5% |
- County Results; Schauer: 40–50% 50–60% Walberg: 40–50% 50–60% 60–70%
U.S. Representative before election
Tim Walberg (inc.)
Republican
Elected U.S. Representative
Mark Schauer
Democratic

The seventh district covers the middle part of southern lower Michigan. Republican incumbent Tim Walberg faced State Senate Minority Leader and Democratic nominee Mark Schauer, Libertarian Ken Proctor, Green Lynn Meadows and independent Sharon Reiner.

Walberg was elected in 2006 with a surprisingly thin 49.9% of the vote, despite outspending Democratic opponent Sharon Reiner 20:1. This made Walberg a top target for defeat in 2008 by the Democratic Congressional Campaign Committee. Schauer defeated Renier in the August 5 primary, after which Renier ran in the general election as a write-in candidate with no party affiliation.

=== Predictions ===
| Source | Ranking | As of |
|---|---|---|
| The Cook Political Report | Tossup | November 6, 2008 |
| Rothenberg | Tossup | November 2, 2008 |
| Sabato's Crystal Ball | Lean D (flip) | November 6, 2008 |
| Real Clear Politics | Tossup | November 7, 2008 |
| CQ Politics | Tossup | November 6, 2008 |

Michigan's 7th congressional district election, 2008
| Party | Candidate | Votes | % |
|---|---|---|---|
| Democratic | Mark Schauer | 157,213 | 48.78 |
| Republican | Tim Walberg (inc.) | 149,781 | 46.47 |
| Green | Lynn Meadows | 9,528 | 2.96 |
| Libertarian | Ken Proctor | 5,675 | 1.76 |
| Write-ins | | 89 | 0.03 |
| Total votes | | 322,286 | 100.00 |
| Democratic gain from Republican | | | |

== District 8 ==
2008 Michigan's 8th congressional district election
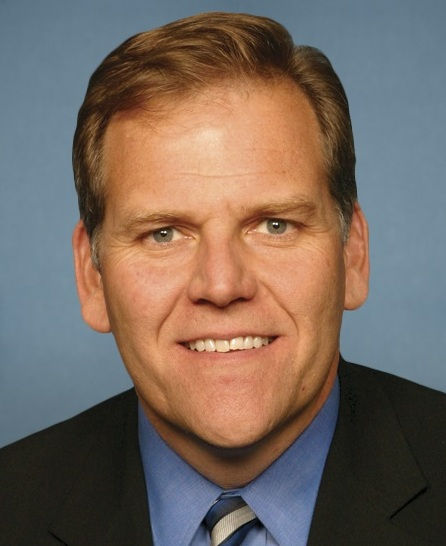

| Nominee | Mike Rogers | Robert D. Alexander |
| Party | Republican | Democratic |
| Popular vote | 204,408 | 145,491 |
| Percentage | 56.5% | 40.2% |
- County Results; Rogers: 50–60% 60–70% Alexander: 50–60%
U.S. Representative before election
Mike Rogers (inc.)
Republican
Elected U.S. Representative
Mike Rogers
Republican

Incumbent Republican Mike Rogers was re-elected in 2006 with 55.3% of the vote compared to 42.9% for his Democratic opponent. East Lansing Democratic activist Bob Alexander (who lost in 2004 to Rogers) announced that he is running again. Aaron Stuttman is running for the Green Party, Will Tyler White for the Libertarian Party, and George Zimmer for the U.S. Taxpayers Party. This district stretches from the western Detroit suburbs to the Lansing area.

=== Predictions ===
| Source | Ranking | As of |
|---|---|---|
| The Cook Political Report | Likely R | November 6, 2008 |
| Rothenberg | Safe R | November 2, 2008 |
| Sabato's Crystal Ball | Safe R | November 6, 2008 |
| Real Clear Politics | Safe R | November 7, 2008 |
| CQ Politics | Safe R | November 6, 2008 |

Michigan's 8th congressional district election, 2008
| Party | Candidate | Votes | % |
|---|---|---|---|
| Republican | Mike Rogers (inc.) | 204,408 | 56.53 |
| Democratic | Robert D. Alexander | 145,491 | 40.23 |
| Libertarian | Will Tyler White | 4,373 | 1.21 |
| Green | Aaron Stuttman | 3,836 | 1.06 |
| Constitution | George M. Zimmer | 3,499 | 0.97 |
| Total votes | | 361,607 | 100.00 |
| Republican hold | | | |

== District 9 ==
2008 Michigan's 9th congressional district election

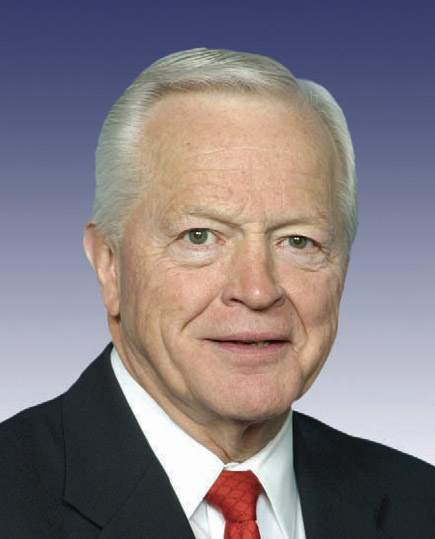
| Nominee | Gary Peters | Joe Knollenberg |
| Party | Democratic | Republican |
| Popular vote | 183,311 | 150,035 |
| Percentage | 52.1% | 42.6% |
- County Results; Peters: 50–60%
U.S. Representative before election
Joe Knollenberg (inc.)
Republican
Elected U.S. Representative
Gary Peters
Democratic

This district covers parts of Oakland County. Republican incumbent Joe Knollenberg was challenged by former Michigan Lottery commissioner and military veteran, Democratic nominee Gary Peters. Libertarian Adam Goodman, Green Party Douglas Campbell and Independent Dr. Jack Kevorkian were also running. Knollenberg was targeted by the Democratic Congressional Campaign Committee after his surprisingly narrow margin of victory in the 2006 election, receiving 51.5% of the vote compared with 46.2% for his Democratic opponent.

=== Predictions ===
| Source | Ranking | As of |
|---|---|---|
| The Cook Political Report | Tossup | November 6, 2008 |
| Rothenberg | Lean D (flip) | November 2, 2008 |
| Sabato's Crystal Ball | Lean D (flip) | November 6, 2008 |
| Real Clear Politics | Tossup | November 7, 2008 |
| CQ Politics | Lean D (flip) | November 6, 2008 |

Michigan's 9th congressional district election, 2008
| Party | Candidate | Votes | % |
|---|---|---|---|
| Democratic | Gary Peters | 183,311 | 52.08 |
| Republican | Joe Knollenberg (inc.) | 150,035 | 42.63 |
| Independent | Jack Kevorkian | 8,987 | 2.55 |
| Libertarian | Adam Goodman | 4,893 | 1.39 |
| Green | Douglas Campbell | 4,737 | 1.19 |
| Total votes | | 351,963 | 100.00 |
| Democratic gain from Republican | | | |

== District 10 ==
2008 Michigan's 10th congressional district election
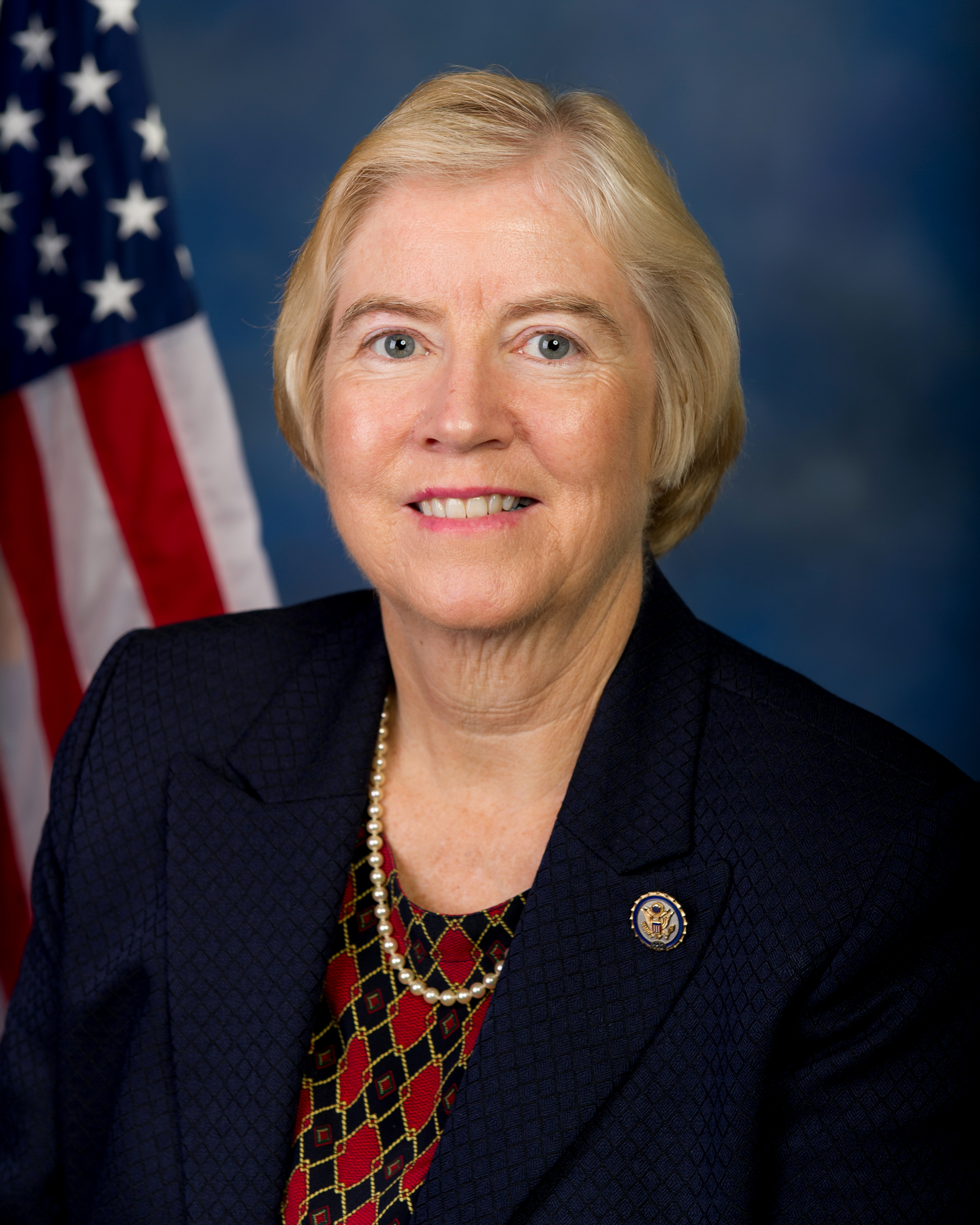

| Nominee | Candice Miller | Robert Denison |
| Party | Republican | Democratic |
| Popular vote | 230,471 | 108,354 |
| Percentage | 66.3% | 31.2% |
- County Results; Miller: 60–70% 70–80%
U.S. Representative before election
Candice Miller (inc.)
Republican
Elected U.S. Representative
Candice Miller
Republican

Republican incumbent Candice Miller was challenged by Democratic nominee Robert Denison, Libertarian Neil Kiernan Stephenson, and Green Candace Caveny. This district stretches from the northeast Detroit suburbs up to most of The Thumb.

=== Predictions ===
| Source | Ranking | As of |
|---|---|---|
| The Cook Political Report | Safe R | November 6, 2008 |
| Rothenberg | Safe R | November 2, 2008 |
| Sabato's Crystal Ball | Safe R | November 6, 2008 |
| Real Clear Politics | Safe R | November 7, 2008 |
| CQ Politics | Safe R | November 6, 2008 |

Michigan's 10th congressional district election, 2008
| Party | Candidate | Votes | % |
|---|---|---|---|
| Republican | Candice Miller (inc.) | 230,471 | 66.30 |
| Democratic | Robert Denison | 108,354 | 31.17 |
| Libertarian | Neil Stephenson | 4,632 | 1.33 |
| Green | Candace R. Caveny | 4,146 | 1.19 |
| Total votes | | 347,603 | 100.00 |
| Republican hold | | | |

== District 11 ==
2008 Michigan's 11th congressional district election
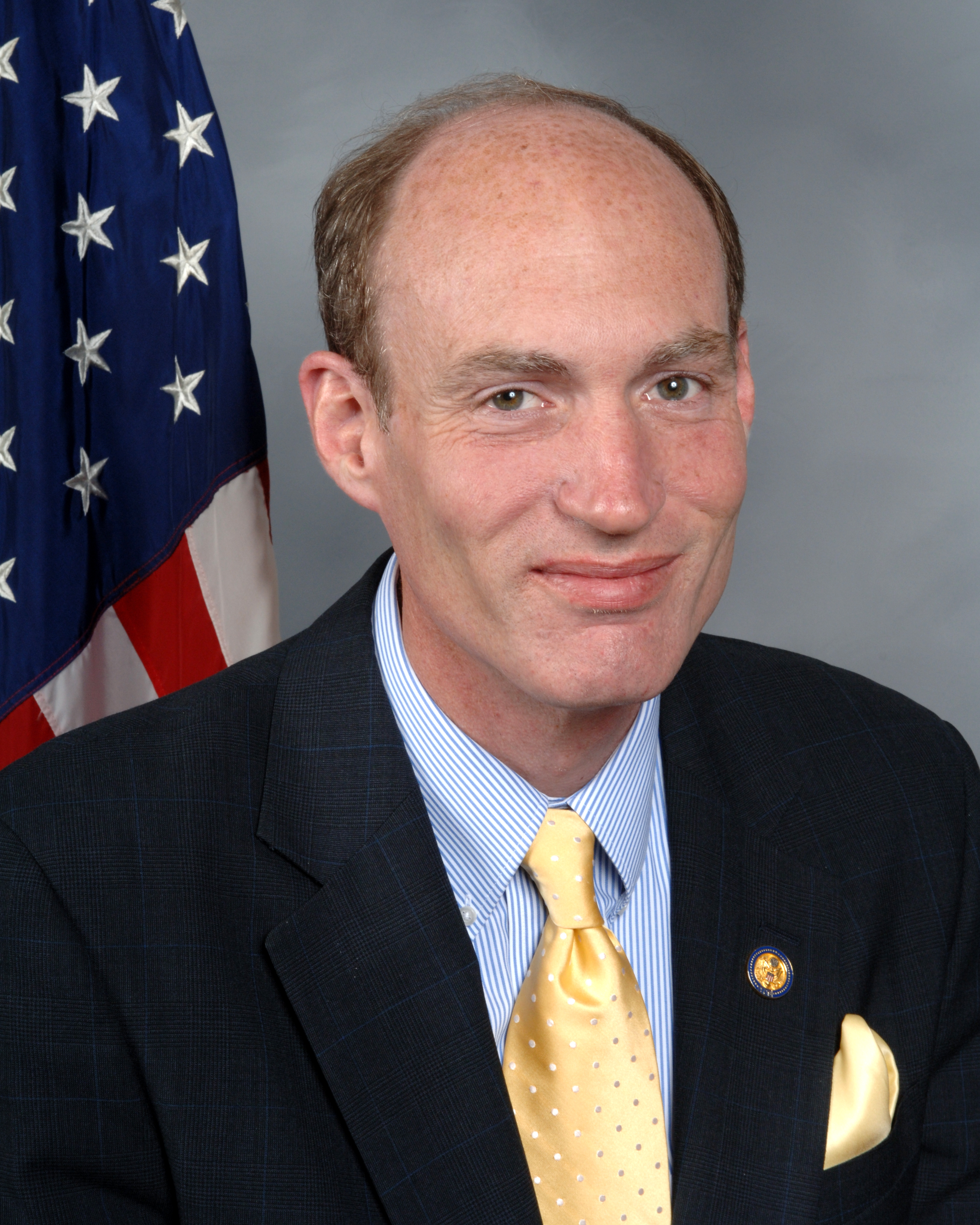

| Nominee | Thaddeus McCotter | Joseph Larkin |
| Party | Republican | Democratic |
| Popular vote | 177,461 | 156,624 |
| Percentage | 51.4% | 45.4% |
- County Results; McCotter: 50–60% Larkin: 40–50%
U.S. Representative before election
Thaddeus McCotter (inc.)
Republican
Elected U.S. Representative
Thaddeus McCotter
Republican

Incumbent Republican Thad McCotter was challenged by Democrat Joseph Larkin who defeated Edward Kriewall in the August 5 party primary. Also running were Libertarian John Tatar and Green Erik Shelley. This district covers part of Detroit's western suburbs.

=== Predictions ===
| Source | Ranking | As of |
|---|---|---|
| The Cook Political Report | Likely R | November 6, 2008 |
| Rothenberg | Safe R | November 2, 2008 |
| Sabato's Crystal Ball | Safe R | November 6, 2008 |
| Real Clear Politics | Safe R | November 7, 2008 |
| CQ Politics | Safe R | November 6, 2008 |

Michigan's 11th congressional district election, 2008
| Party | Candidate | Votes | % |
|---|---|---|---|
| Republican | Thaddeus McCotter (inc.) | 177,461 | 51.41 |
| Democratic | Joseph Larkin | 156,624 | 45.37 |
| Libertarian | John J. Tatar | 6,001 | 1.74 |
| Green | Erik Shelley | 5,072 | 1.47 |
| Write-ins | | 23 | 0.01 |
| Total votes | | 345,182 | 100.00 |
| Republican hold | | | |

== District 12 ==
2008 Michigan's 12th congressional district election
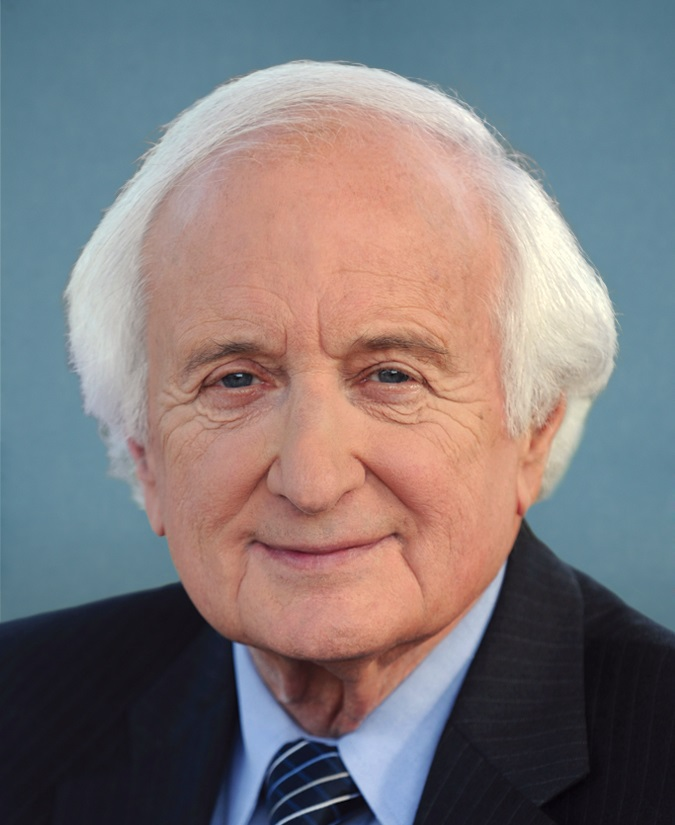

| Nominee | Sander Levin | Bert Copple |
| Party | Democratic | Republican |
| Popular vote | 225,094 | 74,565 |
| Percentage | 72.1% | 23.9% |
- County Results; Levin: 60–70% 80–90%
U.S. Representative before election
Sander Levin (inc.)
Democratic
Elected U.S. Representative
Sander Levin
Democratic

12-term Democrat Sander M. Levin was challenged by Republican Bert Copple, Libertarian John Vico, Green William J. O'Palicky and U.S. Taxpayers' Lester Townsend. This district covers part of Detroit's northern suburbs.

=== Predictions ===
| Source | Ranking | As of |
|---|---|---|
| The Cook Political Report | Safe D | November 6, 2008 |
| Rothenberg | Safe D | November 2, 2008 |
| Sabato's Crystal Ball | Safe D | November 6, 2008 |
| Real Clear Politics | Safe D | November 7, 2008 |
| CQ Politics | Safe D | November 6, 2008 |

Michigan's 12th congressional district election, 2008
| Party | Candidate | Votes | % |
|---|---|---|---|
| Democratic | Sander Levin (inc.) | 225,094 | 72.07 |
| Republican | Bert Copple | 74,565 | 23.87 |
| Libertarian | John Vico | 4,767 | 1.53 |
| Constitution | Les Townsend | 4,076 | 1.30 |
| Green | William J. Opalicky | 3,842 | 1.23 |
| Total votes | | 312,344 | 100.00 |
| Democratic hold | | | |

== District 13 ==
2008 Michigan's 13th congressional district election
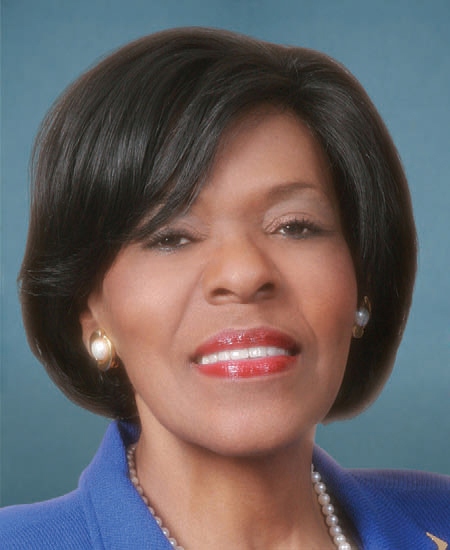

| Nominee | Carolyn Cheeks Kilpatrick | Edward J. Gubics |
| Party | Democratic | Republican |
| Popular vote | 167,481 | 43,098 |
| Percentage | 74.1% | 19.1% |
- County Results; Kilpatrick: 70–80%
U.S. Representative before election
Carolyn Cheeks Kilpatrick (inc.)
Democratic
Elected U.S. Representative
Carolyn Cheeks Kilpatrick
Democratic

Incumbent Democrat Carolyn Cheeks Kilpatrick narrowly survived the August 5 party primary. She faced complications due to the legal troubles facing her son, Detroit mayor Kwame Kilpatrick. Cheeks Kilpatrick won with 39.1% of the vote over former state representative Mary Waters with 36% of the vote and state senator Martha Scott with 24.9% of the vote. A televised debate between the three candidates developed into a shouting match. Cheeks Kilpatrick faced Republican candidate Edward Gubics, Libertarian candidate Greg Creswell and Green Party candidate George Cosetti in the general election. This district covers the east side of Detroit and its eastern and Downriver suburbs.

=== Predictions ===
| Source | Ranking | As of |
|---|---|---|
| The Cook Political Report | Safe D | November 6, 2008 |
| Rothenberg | Safe D | November 2, 2008 |
| Sabato's Crystal Ball | Safe D | November 6, 2008 |
| Real Clear Politics | Safe D | November 7, 2008 |
| CQ Politics | Safe D | November 6, 2008 |

Michigan's 13th congressional district election, 2008
| Party | Candidate | Votes | % |
|---|---|---|---|
| Democratic | Carolyn Cheeks Kilpatrick (inc.) | 167,481 | 74.13 |
| Republican | Edward J. Gubics | 43,098 | 19.08 |
| Green | George L. Corsetti | 9,579 | 4.24 |
| Libertarian | Gregory Creswell | 5,764 | 2.55 |
| Total votes | | 225,922 | 100.00 |
| Democratic hold | | | |

== District 14 ==
2008 Michigan's 14th congressional district election
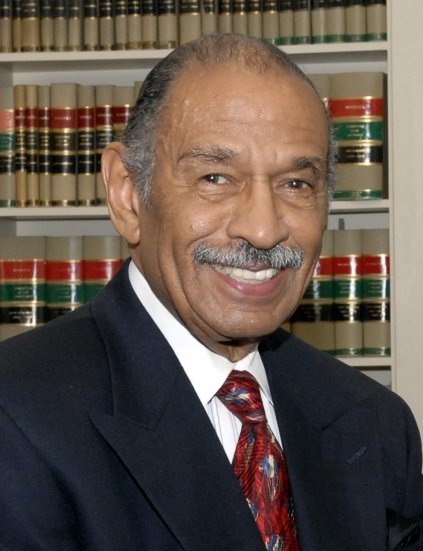

| Nominee | John Conyers | Richard J. Secula |
| Party | Democratic | Libertarian |
| Popular vote | 227,841 | 10,732 |
| Percentage | 92.4% | 4.3% |
- County Results; Conyers: >90%
U.S. Representative before election
John Conyers (inc.)
Democratic
Elected U.S. Representative
John Conyers
Democratic

Powerful incumbent Democrat John Conyers, chairman of the House Judiciary Committee, had one Democratic opponent in the primary, Detroit pastor Rev. Horace Sheffield, but Sheffield's campaign was short lived because he withdrew his name and announced his support for Conyers. Conyers faced Libertarian Rick Secula and Green Party Clyde Shabazz in the general election. This district covers the west side of Detroit and some inner western and downriver suburbs.

=== Predictions ===
| Source | Ranking | As of |
|---|---|---|
| The Cook Political Report | Safe D | November 6, 2008 |
| Rothenberg | Safe D | November 2, 2008 |
| Sabato's Crystal Ball | Safe D | November 6, 2008 |
| Real Clear Politics | Safe D | November 7, 2008 |
| CQ Politics | Safe D | November 6, 2008 |

Michigan's 13th congressional district election, 2008
| Party | Candidate | Votes | % |
|---|---|---|---|
| Democratic | John Conyers (inc.) | 227,841 | 92.40 |
| Libertarian | Richard J. Secula | 10,732 | 4.35 |
| Green | Clyde K. Shabazz | 8,015 | 3.25 |
| Total votes | | 246,588 | 100.00 |
| Democratic hold | | | |

== District 15 ==
2008 Michigan's 15th congressional district election
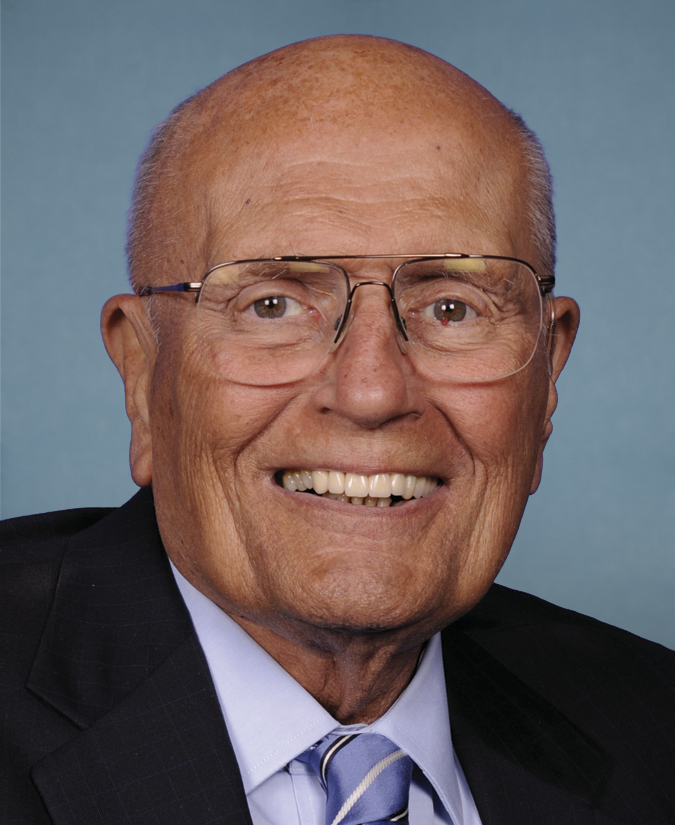

| Nominee | John Dingell | John J. Lynch |
| Party | Democratic | Republican |
| Popular vote | 231,784 | 81,802 |
| Percentage | 70.7% | 24.9% |
- County Results; Dingell: 60–70% 70–80%
U.S. Representative before election
John Dingell (inc.)
Democratic
Elected U.S. Representative
John Dingell
Democratic

55-year Congressional veteran Democrat John Dingell is the Dean of the House and chairman of the House Energy and Commerce Committee. He was challenged by Republican Jack Lynch, Libertarian Gregory Scott Stempfle, Green Aimee Smith and U.S. Taxpayers Party candidate James Wagner. The 15th district includes Ann Arbor, Ypsilanti, Monroe, the downriver suburbs of Detroit and the semi-rural southeastern corner of Michigan.

=== Predictions ===
| Source | Ranking | As of |
|---|---|---|
| The Cook Political Report | Safe D | November 6, 2008 |
| Rothenberg | Safe D | November 2, 2008 |
| Sabato's Crystal Ball | Safe D | November 6, 2008 |
| Real Clear Politics | Safe D | November 7, 2008 |
| CQ Politics | Safe D | November 6, 2008 |

Michigan's 15th congressional district election, 2008
| Party | Candidate | Votes | % |
|---|---|---|---|
| Democratic | John Dingell (inc.) | 231,784 | 70.70 |
| Republican | John J. Lynch | 81,802 | 24.95 |
| Green | Aimee Smith | 7,082 | 2.16 |
| Libertarian | Gregory Stempfle | 4,002 | 1.22 |
| Constitution | James H. Wagner | 3,157 | 0.96 |
| Total votes | | 327,827 | 100.00 |
| Democratic hold | | | |
