= Valparaiso Collegiate Institute =

Educational institution in Indiana, US

Coordinates: 41.47108906°N 87.06008057°W

Valparaiso Collegiate Institute was an institution of secondary education in Valparaiso, Indiana. It was opened in 1861 by the Presbyterians in the community after the Methodists on September 21, 1859, had opened the Valparaiso Male and Female College, the forerunner to Valparaiso University of the Lutheran University Association.

The Collegiate Institute was located on the lot where the city's Central Elementary School now stands. The Institute was a two-story building with four large rooms. When a system of public schools was organized in 1871, the trustees purchased the Institute and used the building as a public school. The original building was expanded by adding a third story, and also by building an exact replica just to the north and connecting the two structures, producing a sixteen large rooms and a chapel. The structure was torn down in 1903.

== Education in Valparaiso ==
Beginning in 1818, the Indiana legislature provided for the creation of county seminaries for the education of the children. A county could establish a seminary and begin applying the allotted revenues from a specific set of court fees assessed within the county. Once the fund reached $400, construction of a building could begin. In 1838, a trustee system was created to administer a counties program. Unlike many counties, Porter County's seminary fund was a little over $2,000 in 1849. Porter County opened its seminary in 1851 with 120 students. The Indiana Legislature had repealed the law just as Porter County's seminary began functioning. The trustees began the process of closing it down, and in July 1853 the building was sold the new Valparaiso School trustees and would reopen as Union School of Valparaiso that fall.

The fire that destroyed the Union School in 1857 saw the start of a series of new schools in Valparaiso. While the city schools built a replacement building, the churches began looking into their own schools. In the spring of 1859, the Methodist opened the Valparaiso Male and Female College. In April 1861, the Presbyterians opened the Valparaiso Collegiate Institute. St. Paul's Catholic Parish school opened in 1863. As German immigrants began to settle in Valparaiso, the Lutheran church opened its own school in 1865. All these schools were initially secondary schools serving the people of Center Township. The Methodist Male and Female College's location away from town led to a continuing struggle to remain solvent. All of these school remain (as of 2021). The Male and Female College transformed into the Northern Indiana Normal and finally into Valparaiso University.
