= 1998 United States House of Representatives elections in Michigan =

- November 3, 1998

All 16 Michigan seats to the United States House of Representatives
	Majority party	Minority party
Party	Democratic	Republican
Last election	10	6
Seats won	10	6
Seat change	Steady	Steady
Popular vote	1,469,111	1,438,283
Percentage	49.21%	48.17%

The 1998 congressional elections in Michigan was held on November 3, to determine who would represent the state of Michigan in the United States House of Representatives. Michigan had sixteen seats in the House, apportioned according to the 1990 United States census. Representatives are elected for two-year terms.

Only 3 of the 16 congressional districts saw contested primary elections on August 4.

In the general elections, all incumbents were re-elected.

== Overview ==
United States House of Representatives elections in Michigan, 1998
Party	Votes	Percentage	Seats before	Seats after	+/–
Democratic	1,469,111	49.21%	10	10	-
Republican	1,438,283	48.17%	6	6	-
Libertarian	51,589	1.72%	0	0	-
Natural Law	20,705	0.69%	0	0	-
Reform	4,654	0.15%	0	0	-
Independent	808	0.02%	0	0	-
Write-ins	83	0.00%	0	0	-
Total	2,985,233	100.00%	16	16	-

== District 1 ==
Michelle McManus was a term-limited state representative who sought the Republican congressional nomination. Her nomination petition signatures required for her to appear on the August primary ballot were challenged by Democrats, as well as a Republican primary competitor Bob Carr. (Note: Bob Carr was the 1996 Republican nominee for U.S. House in the first district, not be confused with Democratic Congressman Bob Carr.) Some of her nominating petitions had the wrong primary election date on them. She was further accused of using under-aged teenagers to circulate some of the petitions. State Democratic Chair Mark Brewer accused McManus of election fraud. The state board of canvassers ruled on June 2, disqualifying some of McManus's signatures, but ultimately allowing enough of them for her to qualify to appear on the primary ballot.

In the general, incumbent Democrat Bart Stupak was re-elected.

=== Primary elections ===
Democratic primary election
Party	Candidate	Votes	%
Democratic	Bart Stupak (incumbent)	45,691	100.0
Total votes		45,691	100.0

Republican primary election
Party	Candidate	Votes	%
Republican	Michelle McManus	28,428	63.83%
Republican	Bob Carr	13,019	29.23%
Republican	Tom Schoech	3,087	6.93%
Total votes		44,534	100.0

=== General election ===
1998 Michigan's 1st congressional district election
Party	Candidate	Votes	%
Democratic	Bart Stupak (incumbent)	130,129	58.67%
Republican	Michelle McManus	87,630	39.50%
Libertarian	John Loosemore	2,306	1.03%
Natural Law	Wendy Conway	1,731	0.78%
Total votes		221,796	100.0
Democratic hold			

== District 2 ==
On May 15, the sole Democrat who qualified to compete in the primary election, Daniel L. Frein, withdrew from the race. On June 24, retired attorney Bob Shrauger announced his candidacy. Shrauger ran a write-in campaign in the Democratic primary election. The Grand Rapids Press described Shrauger's campaign as "last minute". Shrauger won enough write-in votes in the primary to qualify to appear on the general ballot, winning more than twice the vote requirement.

The general election was won by incumbent Republican Pete Hoekstra.

=== Primary elections ===
Republican primary election
Party	Candidate	Votes	%
Republican	Pete Hoekstra (incumbent)	42,435	100.0
Total votes		42,435	100.0

Democratic primary election
Party	Candidate	Votes	%
Write-In	Bob Shrauger	2,509	100.0
Total votes		2,509	100.0

=== General election ===
1998 Michigan's 2nd congressional district election
Party	Candidate	Votes	%
Republican	Pete Hoekstra (incumbent)	146,854	68.74%
Democratic	Bob Shrauger	63,573	29.75%
Libertarian	Bruce Smith	2,062	0.96%
Natural Law	Tom Russell	1,133	0.53%
Total votes		213,622	100.0
Republican hold			

== District 3 ==
The general election was won by incumbent Republican Vern Ehlers.

=== Primary elections ===
Republican primary election
Party	Candidate	Votes	%
Republican	Vern Ehlers (incumbent)	36,774	100.0
Total votes		36,774	100.0

Democratic primary election
Party	Candidate	Votes	%
Democratic	John Ferguson Jr.	16,707	100.0
Total votes		16,707	100.0

=== General election ===
1998 Michigan's 3rd congressional district election
Party	Candidate	Votes	%
Republican	Vern Ehlers (incumbent)	146,364	73.09%
Democratic	John Ferguson Jr.	49,489	24.71%
Libertarian	Erwin Haas	2,537	1.26%
Natural Law	Lucille Wiggins	1,861	0.92
Total votes		200,251	100.0
Republican hold			

== District 4 ==
Thomas Rundquist was the sole Democrat attempting to run for Congress in the 4th district. Prior to the primary election, the state board of canvassers rejected enough of his nominating petitions to prevent his name from appearing on the primary ballot. After this, he ran a write-in campaign in the Democratic primary. He did not receive enough votes in the Democratic primary to appear on the November general ballot. He then ran a write-in campaign in the general election.

The general election was won by Republican incumbent Dave Camp.

=== Primary elections ===
Republican primary election
Party	Candidate	Votes	%
Republican	Dave Camp (incumbent)	43,143	100.0
Total votes		43,143	100.0

Democratic primary election
Party	Candidate	Votes	%
Write-In	Thomas Rundquist	59	100.0
Total votes		59	100.0

=== General election ===
1998 Michigan's 4th congressional district election
Party	Candidate	Votes	%
Republican	Dave Camp (incumbent)	155,343	91.31%
Libertarian	Dan Marsh	10,404	6.11%
Natural Law	Stuart Goldberg	4,332	2.54%
Write-In	Thomas Rundquist	30	0.01%
Total votes		170,109	100.0
Republican hold			

== District 5 ==
The general election was won by incumbent Democrat James Barcia.

=== Primary elections ===
Democratic primary election
Party	Candidate	Votes	%
Democratic	James Barcia (incumbent)	37,364	100.0
Total votes		37,364	100.0

Republican primary election
Party	Candidate	Votes	%
Republican	Donald Brewster	20,066	100.0
Total votes		20,066	100.0

=== General election ===
1998 Michigan's 5th congressional district election
Party	Candidate	Votes	%
Democratic	James Barcia (incumbent)	135,254	71.19%
Republican	Donald Brewster	51,442	27.07%
Libertarian	Clint Foster	2,179	1.14%
Natural Law	Brian Ellison	1,096	0.57%
Total votes		189,971	100.0
Democratic hold			

== District 6 ==
The general election was won by incumbent Republican Fred Upton.

=== Primary elections ===
Republican primary election
Party	Candidate	Votes	%
Republican	Fred Upton (incumbent)	43,881	100.0
Total votes		43,881	100.0

Democratic primary election
Party	Candidate	Votes	%
Democratic	Clarence Annen	9,382	100.0
Total votes		9,382	100.0

=== General election ===
1998 Michigan's 6th congressional district election
Party	Candidate	Votes	%
Republican	Fred Upton (incumbent)	113,292	70.09%
Democratic	Clarence Annen	45,358	28.06%
Libertarian	Glenn Whitt Jr.	1,833	1.13%
Natural Law	Ken Asmus	1,091	0.67%
Write-In	Richard Overton	53	0.03%
Total votes		161,627	100.0
Republican hold			

== District 7 ==
The general election was won by incumbent Republican Nick Smith.

=== Primary elections ===
Republican primary election
Party	Candidate	Votes	%
Republican	Nick Smith (incumbent)	29,916	100.0
Total votes		29,916	100.0

Democratic primary election
Party	Candidate	Votes	%
Democratic	Jim Berryman	18,557	100.0
Total votes		18,557	100.0

=== General election ===
1998 Michigan's 7th congressional district election
Party	Candidate	Votes	%
Republican	Nick Smith (incumbent)	104,656	57.46%
Democratic	Jim Berryman	72,998	40.08%
Libertarian	Kenneth Proctor	2,684	1.47%
Natural Law	Lynnea Ellison	1,789	0.98%
Total votes		182,127	100.0
Republican hold			

== District 8 ==
The general election was won by incumbent Democrat Debbie Stabenow.

=== Primary elections ===
Democratic primary election
Party	Candidate	Votes	%
Democratic	Debbie Stabenow (incumbent)	34,935	100.0
Total votes		34,935	100.0

Republican primary election
Party	Candidate	Votes	%
Republican	Susan Munsell	22,067	100.0
Total votes		22,067	100.0

Reform primary election
Party	Candidate	Votes	%
Reform	John Mangopoulos	52	100.0
Total votes		52	100.0

=== General election ===
1998 Michigan's 8th congressional district election
Party	Candidate	Votes	%
Democratic	Debbie Stabenow (incumbent)	125,169	57.40%
Republican	Susan Munsell	84,254	38.64%
Reform	John Mangopoulos	4,654	2.13%
Libertarian	Ben Steele III	2,750	1.26%
Natural Law	Patricia Allen	1,213	0.55%
Total votes		218,040	100.0
Democratic hold			

== District 9 ==
The general election was won by incumbent Democrat Dale Kildee.

=== Primary elections ===
Democratic primary election
Party	Candidate	Votes	%
Democratic	Dale Kildee (incumbent)	37,898	100.0
Total votes		37,898	100.0

Republican primary election
Party	Candidate	Votes	%
Republican	Tom McMillin	27,560	100.0
Total votes		27,560	100.0

=== General election ===
1998 Michigan's 9th congressional district election
Party	Candidate	Votes	%
Democratic	Dale Kildee (incumbent)	105,457	55.93%
Republican	Tom McMillin	79,062	41.93%
Libertarian	Malcolm Johnson	4,006	2.12%
Total votes		188,525	100.0
Democratic hold			

== District 10 ==
The general election was won by incumbent Democrat David Bonior. According the Associated Press, the seat was thought by Republicans to be potentially vulnerable, and the party allocated a notable amount of funds to the campaign against Bonior. While the district voted to re-elect Republican Governor John Engler, it also re-elected the Democrat Levin.

=== Primary elections ===
Democratic primary election
Party	Candidate	Votes	%
Democratic	David Bonior (incumbent)	42,011	100.0
Total votes		42,011	100.0

Republican primary election
Party	Candidate	Votes	%
Republican	Brian Palmer	23,575	
Republican	Donald Lobsinger	11,703	
Total votes		35,278	100.0

=== General election ===
1998 Michigan's 10th congressional district election
Party	Candidate	Votes	%
Democratic	David Bonior (incumbent)	108,770	52.41%
Republican	Brian Palmer	94,027	45.30%
Libertarian	R. Friend	3,396	1.63%
Natural Law	Henry Clark	1,331	0.64%
Total votes		207,524	100.0
Democratic hold			

== District 11 ==
The general election was won by incumbent Republican Joe Knollenberg.

=== Primary elections ===
Republican primary election
Party	Candidate	Votes	%
Republican	Joe Knollenberg (incumbent)	45,030	100.0
Total votes		45,030	100.0

Democratic primary election
Party	Candidate	Votes	%
Democratic	Travis Reeds	35,044	100.0
Total votes		35,044	100.0

=== General election ===
1998 Michigan's 11th congressional district election
Party	Candidate	Votes	%
Republican	Joe Knollenberg (incumbent)	144,264	63.88%
Democratic	Travis Reeds	76,107	33.70%
Libertarian	Dick Gach	5,433	2.40%
Total votes		225,804	100.0
Republican hold			

== District 12 ==
The general election was won by incumbent Democrat Sander Levin. According the Associated Press, the seat was thought by Republicans to be potentially vulnerable, and the party allocated a notable amount of funds to the campaign against Levin. While the district voted to re-elect Republican Governor John Engler, it also re-elected the Democrat Levin.

=== Primary elections ===
Democratic primary election
Party	Candidate	Votes	%
Democratic	Sander Levin (incumbent)	43,441	100.0
Total votes		43,441	100.0

Republican primary election
Party	Candidate	Votes	%
Republican	Leslie Touma	22,419	100.0
Total votes		22,419	100.0

=== General election ===
1998 Michigan's 12th congressional district election
Party	Candidate	Votes	%
Democratic	Sander Levin (incumbent)	105,824	55.86%
Republican	Leslie Touma	79,619	42.03%
Libertarian	Albert Titran	2,813	1.48%
Natural Law	Fred Rosenberg	1,172	0.61%
Total votes		189,428	100.0
Democratic hold			

== District 13 ==
The general election was won by incumbent Democrat Lynn Rivers. According the Associated Press, the seat was thought by Republicans to be potentially vulnerable, and the party allocated a notable amount of funds to the campaign against Rivers.

=== Primary elections ===
Democratic primary election
Party	Candidate	Votes	%
Democratic	Lynn Rivers (incumbent)	36,822	100.0
Total votes		36,822	100.0

Republican primary election
Party	Candidate	Votes	%
Republican	Tom Hickey	18,414	100.0
Total votes		18,414	100.0

=== General election ===
1998 Michigan's 13th congressional district election
Party	Candidate	Votes	%
Democratic	Lynn Rivers (incumbent)	99,935	58.13%
Republican	Tom Hickey	68,328	39.75%
Libertarian	Dean Hutyra	2,873	1.67%
Natural Law	Samir Makarem	751	0.43%
Total votes		171,887	100.0
Democratic hold			

== District 14 ==
The general election was won by incumbent Democrat John Conyers.

=== Primary elections ===
Democratic primary election
Party	Candidate	Votes	%
Democratic	John Conyers (incumbent)	90,178	100.0
Total votes		90,178	100.0

Republican primary election
Party	Candidate	Votes	%
Republican	Vendella Collins	5,202	100.0
Total votes		5,202	100.0

=== General election ===
1998 Michigan's 14th congressional district election
Party	Candidate	Votes	%
Democratic	John Conyers (incumbent)	126,321	86.93%
Republican	Vendella Collins	16,140	11.10%
Libertarian	Michael Freyman	1,764	1.21%
Natural Law	Richard Miller	1,080	0.74%
Total votes		145,305	100.0
Democratic hold			

== District 15 ==
The general election was won by incumbent Democrat Carolyn Cheeks Kilpatrick.

=== Primary elections ===
Democratic primary election
Party	Candidate	Votes	%
Democratic	Carolyn Cheeks Kilpatrick (incumbent)	72,860	89.44%
Democratic	Godfrey Dillard	8,600	10.55%
Total votes		81,460	100.0

Republican primary election
Party	Candidate	Votes	%
Republican	Chrysanthea Boyd-Fields	3,646	100.0
Total votes		3,646	100.0

=== General election ===
1998 Michigan's 15th congressional district election
Party	Candidate	Votes	%
Democratic	Carolyn Cheeks Kilpatrick (incumbent)	108,582	86.96%
Republican	Chrysanthea Boyd-Fields	12,887	10.32%
Libertarian	Linda Willey	1,485	1.18%
Natural Law	Gregory Smith	1,098	0.87%
Independent	Holly Harkness	808	0.64%
Write-In	Kenneth Embree	0	0.00%
Total votes		124,860	100.0
Democratic hold			

== District 16 ==
The general election was won by incumbent Democrat John Dingell.

=== Primary elections ===
Democratic primary election
Party	Candidate	Votes	%
Democratic	John Dingell (incumbent)	44,300	100.0
Total votes		44,300	100.0

Republican primary election
Party	Candidate	Votes	%
Republican	William Morse	16,465	100.0
Total votes		16,465	100.0

=== General election ===
1998 Michigan's 16th congressional district election
Party	Candidate	Votes	%
Democratic	John Dingell (incumbent)	116,145	66.61%
Republican	William Morse	54,121	31.04%
Libertarian	Edward Hlavac	3,064	1.75%
Natural Law	Noha Hamze	1,027	0.58%
Total votes		174,357	100.0
Democratic hold			
