= Christopher D. Dingell =

American politician (born 1957)

Christopher Dingell

Member of the Michigan Senate from the 7th district
- In office 1987–2003
- Preceded by: James R. DeSana
- Succeeded by: Bruce Patterson

Personal details
- Born: Christopher Dennis Dingell; February 23, 1957 (age 69) Washington, D.C., U.S.
- Party: Democratic
- Relations: John Dingell (father); John Dingell Sr. (grandfather); Debbie Dingell (stepmother)
- Education: University of Michigan, Detroit College of Law
- Occupation: Judge, lawyer

Christopher Dennis Dingell (born February 23, 1957) is an American former politician and current judge.

== Background ==
From Trenton, Michigan, Dingell studied materials and metallurgical engineering at the University of Michigan. He then received his bachelor's degree from University of Michigan in 1978 and his J.D. degree from Detroit College of Law in 1986. He served in the Michigan State Senate from 1987 to 2003 and was a Democrat. A third-generation politician, his grandfather John Dingell Sr., father John Dingell Jr., and stepmother Debbie Dingell have successively represented suburban Detroit in the United States House of Representatives since 1932. Dingell then began working as a Michigan Circuit Court judge, now as member of 3rd Circuit for Wayne County.

Dingell is of Polish descent, through his great-grandparents who were immigrants from Bączal Górny.
