= Baltimore Affair =

The Baltimore affair may refer to:

- The Baltimore crisis, an 1891 diplomatic incident between Chile and the United States
- The events surrounding allegations of research misconduct against immunologist Thereza Imanishi-Kari
