= 1955 Michigan's 15th congressional district special election =

On December 13, 1955, voters in Michigan's 15th congressional district elected Democrat John Dingell to the U.S. House of Representatives. His father, John Dingell Sr., was the incumbent and died September 19, 1955. The younger Dingell went on to become the longest-serving member in Congress in American History and went on to elect twenty-nine full terms until he retired in 2014.

== Results ==
Unofficial returns
| Party | Candidate | Votes | % |
|---|---|---|---|
| Democratic | John Dingell | 19,624 | 76.09% |
| Republican | Thomas E. Brennan | 6,108 | 23.68% |
| Socialist Labor | Charles Schwartz | 58 | 0.002% |
| Democratic hold | | | |
| Turnout | | | <17% |

== See also ==
- 1954 United States House of Representatives elections
