= John Lesinski Jr. =

American politician

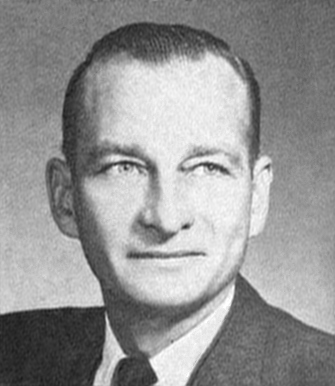

Member of the U.S. House of Representatives from Michigan's 16th district
- In office January 3, 1951 – January 3, 1965
- Preceded by: John Lesinski Sr.
- Succeeded by: John Dingell

Personal details
- Born: December 28, 1914 Detroit, Michigan, U.S.
- Died: October 21, 2005 (aged 90) Dearborn, Michigan, U.S.
- Party: Democratic
- Relatives: John Lesinski Sr. (father)

Military service
- Allegiance: United States
- Branch/service: United States Navy
- Years of service: 1933-1937
- Battles/wars: World War II

John Lesinski Jr. (December 28, 1914 – October 21, 2005) was a U.S. congressman for seven terms from the state of Michigan. He was the son of John Lesinski Sr. He was of Polish descent.

== Life and career ==
Lesinski was born in Detroit. At the age of eleven years, he moved with his parents to Dearborn. He attended parochial schools, SS. Cyril and Methodius Seminary in Orchard Lake, and graduated from Fordson High School in Dearborn. At the age of eighteen years, he enlisted in the United States Navy as an apprentice seaman and served from 1933 to 1937.

He was called to active duty again in February 1941, and served during World War II until October 1945. He was awarded the Navy and Marine Corps Medal and Purple Heart Medal. He was vice president of Hamtramck Lumber Company from 1939 to 1943 and again from 1951 to 1954, as well as president of Dearborn Properties.

Lesinski's father, John Lesinski Sr., died in May 1950, leaving his seat in Congress vacant. In November 1950, Lesinski Jr. was elected as a Democrat from Michigan's 16th congressional district to the 82nd United States Congress and to the six succeeding Congresses, serving from January 3, 1951, to January 3, 1965.

He was an unsuccessful candidate for renomination to the 89th Congress in 1964, losing to fellow Democrat John Dingell. Lesinski was one of the few Northern Democrats to oppose the Civil Rights Act of 1964. Dingell was the incumbent U.S. Representative from Michigan's 15th congressional district, but portions of the 16th and the 15th districts were combined into a redrawn 16th district for the 1964 elections.

He was a member of the board of commissioners of Wayne County from 1968 to 1973.

He died on October 21, 2005, in Dearborn, MI.

U.S. House of Representatives
Preceded by John Lesinski Sr.	United States Representative for the 16th congressional district of Michigan; 1951–1965	Succeeded by John Dingell Jr.
