= John Lesinski Sr. =

American politician

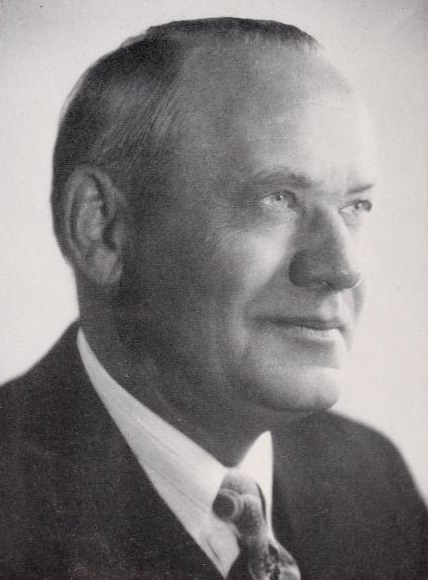
- Frontispiece of 1951's John Lesinski, Late a Representative from Michigan

Member of the U.S. House of Representatives from Michigan's 16th district
- In office March 4, 1933 – May 27, 1950
- Preceded by: None (District created)
- Succeeded by: John Lesinski Jr.

Personal details
- Born: John Lesinski; January 3, 1885 Erie, Pennsylvania
- Died: May 27, 1950 (aged 65) Dearborn, Michigan
- Party: Democratic
- Spouse: 3
- Children: 9 (including John Lesinski Jr.)
- Education: Detroit Business University
- Occupation: Lumber and building supply Home building

John Lesinski Sr. (January 3, 1885 – May 27, 1950) was a politician from the U.S. state of Michigan. He was the father of John Lesinski Jr., who succeeded him in the United States House of Representatives.

== Early life ==
Lesinski was born in Erie, Pennsylvania on January 3, 1885, and his parents moved their family to Detroit, Michigan three months later. He attended the school of St. Albertus Roman Catholic Church, SS. Cyril and Methodius Seminary in Orchard Lake, and Detroit Business University.

== Start of career ==
He engaged extensively in the building and real estate business in Detroit; established lumber and supply companies in Hamtramck and Dearborn areas of Detroit. He was president of the Polish Citizens' Committee of Detroit from 1919 to 1932, and was credited with recruiting thousands of Polish-Americans and Polish-Canadians to join the military and fight against the Axis during World War I. In addition, he was state commissioner in charge of the sale of bonds which raised funds for rebuilding Poland when the country was re-formed following World War I, for which he was awarded the Polonia Restituta by the Polish Government. He was a delegate to the Democratic National Conventions in 1936, 1940, and 1944. He was also a delegate to the Democratic State conventions in 1936, 1940, and 1944.

== Congress ==
In 1932, Lesinski was elected as a Democrat and the first person to represent Michigan's 16th congressional district to the 73rd United States Congress, and was reelected to the eight succeeding Congresses, serving in the U.S. House from March 4, 1933, until his death.

He served as chairman of the Committee on Invalid Pensions in the 74th through 79th Congresses; of the Committee on Immigration and Naturalization in the 79th Congress, and of the Committee on Education and Labor in the 81st Congress.

Lesinski died in Dearborn, Michigan on May 27, 1950, and was interred in Mount Olivet Cemetery in Detroit, Michigan.

== Family ==
Lesinski was married three times. His first wife, Stella died in 1919, and his second wife, Barbara, died in 1937. His third wife Estelle Geisinger, survived him.

Lesinski was the father of nine children, seven of whom survived to adulthood—Joan, John, Maxine, Delphine, Raymond, Beverly, and Edwin.

== See also ==
- List of members of the United States Congress who died in office (1950–1999)

== Sources ==
=== Books ===
- John Lesinski, Late a Representative from Michigan. Washington, DC: US Government Printing Office. 1951.

=== Newspapers ===
"Rites Set For Lesinski Wednesday". Detroit Free Press. Detroit, MI. May 28, 1950 – via Newspapers.com.

U.S. House of Representatives
Preceded by None	United States Representative for the 16th Congressional District of Michigan; 1933 – 1950	Succeeded by John Lesinski Jr.
