= Michael D. MacDonald =

American politician

Michael D. MacDonald Dr. Senator

Member of the Michigan Senate from the 10th district
- In office January 1, 2019 – January 1, 2023
- Preceded by: Tory Rocca
- Succeeded by: Paul Wojno

Personal details
- Party: Republican
- Spouse: Lauraanne
- Children: Evelyn Michelle
- Education: Macomb Community College; Western Michigan University; Oakland University
- Website: Elect Mike MacDonald

Michael D. MacDonald is an American politician who served as a Republican member of the Michigan Senate, representing the 10th district from January 1, 2019, to January 1, 2023.

== Career ==
Before being elected to the state senate, Dr. MacDonald worked in the health care field as an exercise physiologist and personal trainer for nearly 10 years prior to obtaining a Doctoral Degree in Health Care Administration in 2015.

After redistricting in 2022, MacDonald was placed into the 11th Senate district. There, MacDonald was defeated by Democratic nominee Veronica Klinefelt in the 2022 general election.
