= Michigan's 16th congressional district =

Former U.S. House district from 1933 to 2003

Coordinates: 42°0′N 83°30′W

- Obsolete district
- Created: 1930
- Eliminated: 2000
- Years active: 1933–2003

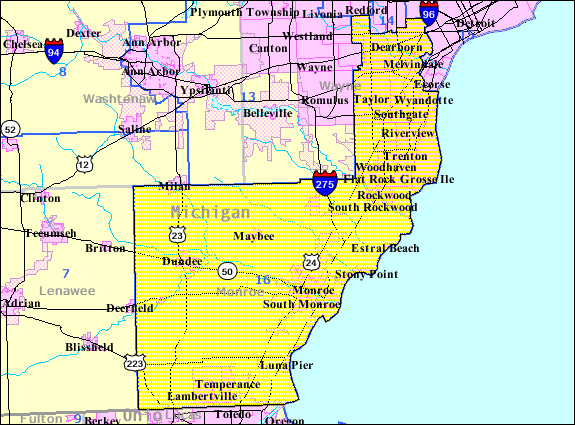
The 16th district boundaries for the 106th Congress, prior to being eliminated after redistricting in 2002

Michigan's 16th congressional district is an obsolete United States congressional district in Michigan. It covered the communities of Dearborn, Downriver and Monroe County.

The first Representative to Congress elected from the 16th district, John Lesinski, Sr., took office in 1933, after reapportionment due to the 1930 census. The district was dissolved following the 2000 census. The last Representative elected from the district, John Dingell, was subsequently elected from the 15th district. The only other Representative elected from the 16th district in its 70 years of existence was John Lesinski, Jr. It could be called a Polish district, because all three district's representatives were Polish-Americans.

== Voting ==
Election results from presidential races
Year	Office	Results
2000	President	Gore 51 - 47%
1996	President	Clinton 54 - 34%
1992	President	Clinton 43 - 36%

== List of members representing the district ==
Representative	Party	Term	Cong ress	Electoral history
District created March 4, 1933
John Lesinski Sr. (Dearborn)	Democratic	March 4, 1933– May 27, 1950	73rd 74th 75th 76th 77th 78th 79th 80th 81st	Elected in 1932. Re-elected in 1934. Re-elected in 1936; Re-elected in 1938. Re-elected in 1940. Re-elected in 1942. Re-elected in 1944. Re-elected in 1946. Re-elected in 1948. Died.
Vacant		May 27, 1950– January 3, 1951	81st	
John Lesinski Jr. (Dearborn)	Democratic	January 3, 1951– January 3, 1965	82nd 83rd 84th 85th 86th 87th 88th	Elected in 1950. Re-elected in 1952. Re-elected in 1954. Re-elected in 1956. Re-elected in 1958. Re-elected in 1960. Re-elected in 1962. Lost renomination.
John Dingell (Dearborn)	Democratic	January 3, 1965– January 3, 2003	89th 90th 91st 92nd 93rd 94th 95th 96th 97th 98th 99th 100th 101st 102nd 103rd 104th 105th 106th 107th	Redistricted from the 15th district and re-elected in 1964. Re-elected in 1966. Re-elected in 1968. Re-elected in 1970. Re-elected in 1972. Re-elected in 1974. Re-elected in 1976. Re-elected in 1978. Re-elected in 1980. Re-elected in 1982. Re-elected in 1984. Re-elected in 1986. Re-elected in 1988. Re-elected in 1990. Re-elected in 1992. Re-elected in 1994. Re-elected in 1996. Re-elected in 1998. Re-elected in 2000. Redistricted to the 15th district.
District eliminated January 3, 2003

== Elections ==
1964 election
Party	Candidate	Votes	%	±%
Democratic	John Dingell	112,763	73%	
Republican	John Lesinski Jr. (Incumbent)	40,673	27%	

1966 election
Party	Candidate	Votes	%	±%
Democratic	John Dingell (Incumbent)	71,787	63%	
Republican	John T. Dempsey	42,738	37%	

1968 election
Party	Candidate	Votes	%	±%
Democratic	John Dingell (Incumbent)	105,690	74%	
Republican	Monte Bona	37,000	26%	

1970 election
Party	Candidate	Votes	%	±%
Democratic	John Dingell (Incumbent)	90,540	79%	
Republican	William Rostrom	23,867	21%	

1972 election
Party	Candidate	Votes	%	±%
Democratic	John Dingell (Incumbent)	110,715	70%	
Republican	William Rostrom	48,414	30%	

1974 election
Party	Candidate	Votes	%	±%
Democratic	John Dingell (Incumbent)	95,834	78%	
Republican	Wallace English	25,248	22%	

1976 election
Party	Candidate	Votes	%	±%
Democratic	John Dingell (Incumbent)	121,682	76%	
Republican	William Rostrom	36,378	24%	

1978 election
Party	Candidate	Votes	%	±%
Democratic	John Dingell (Incumbent)	93,387	70%	
Republican	Melvin Heuer	26,827	30%	

1980 election
Party	Candidate	Votes	%	±%
Democratic	John Dingell (Incumbent)	105,844	70%	
Republican	Pamella Seay	42,735	30%	

1982 election
Party	Candidate	Votes	%	±%
Democratic	John Dingell (Incumbent)	114,006	74%	
Republican	David K. Haskins	39,227	26%	

1984 election
Party	Candidate	Votes	%	±%
Democratic	John Dingell (Incumbent)	121,463	64%	
Republican	Frank Grzywacki	68,116	36%	

1986 election
Party	Candidate	Votes	%	±%
Democratic	John Dingell (Incumbent)	101,659	78%	
Republican	Frank Grzywacki	28,791	22%	

1988 election
Party	Candidate	Votes	%	±%
Democratic	John Dingell (Incumbent)	132,775	100%	

1990 election
Party	Candidate	Votes	%	±%
Democratic	John Dingell (Incumbent)	88,962	67%	
Republican	William T. Morse	42,469	33%	

1992 election
Party	Candidate	Votes	%	±%
Democratic	John Dingell (Incumbent)	156,964	65%	
Republican	Frank Beaumont	75,694	35%	

1994 election
Party	Candidate	Votes	%	±%
Democratic	John Dingell (Incumbent)	105,846	60%	
Republican	Ken Larkin	71,159	40%	

1996 election
Party	Candidate	Votes	%	±%
Democratic	John Dingell (Incumbent)	136,854	64%	
Republican	James Deshauna	78,723	36%	

1998 election
Party	Candidate	Votes	%	±%
Democratic	John Dingell (Incumbent)	116,145	67%	
Republican	William T. Morse	54,121	33%	

2000 election
Party	Candidate	Votes	%	±%
Democratic	John Dingell (Incumbent)	167,142	72%	
Republican	William T. Morse	62,469	28%	
