= John Dingell Sr. =

American politician (1894–1955)

John D. Dingell
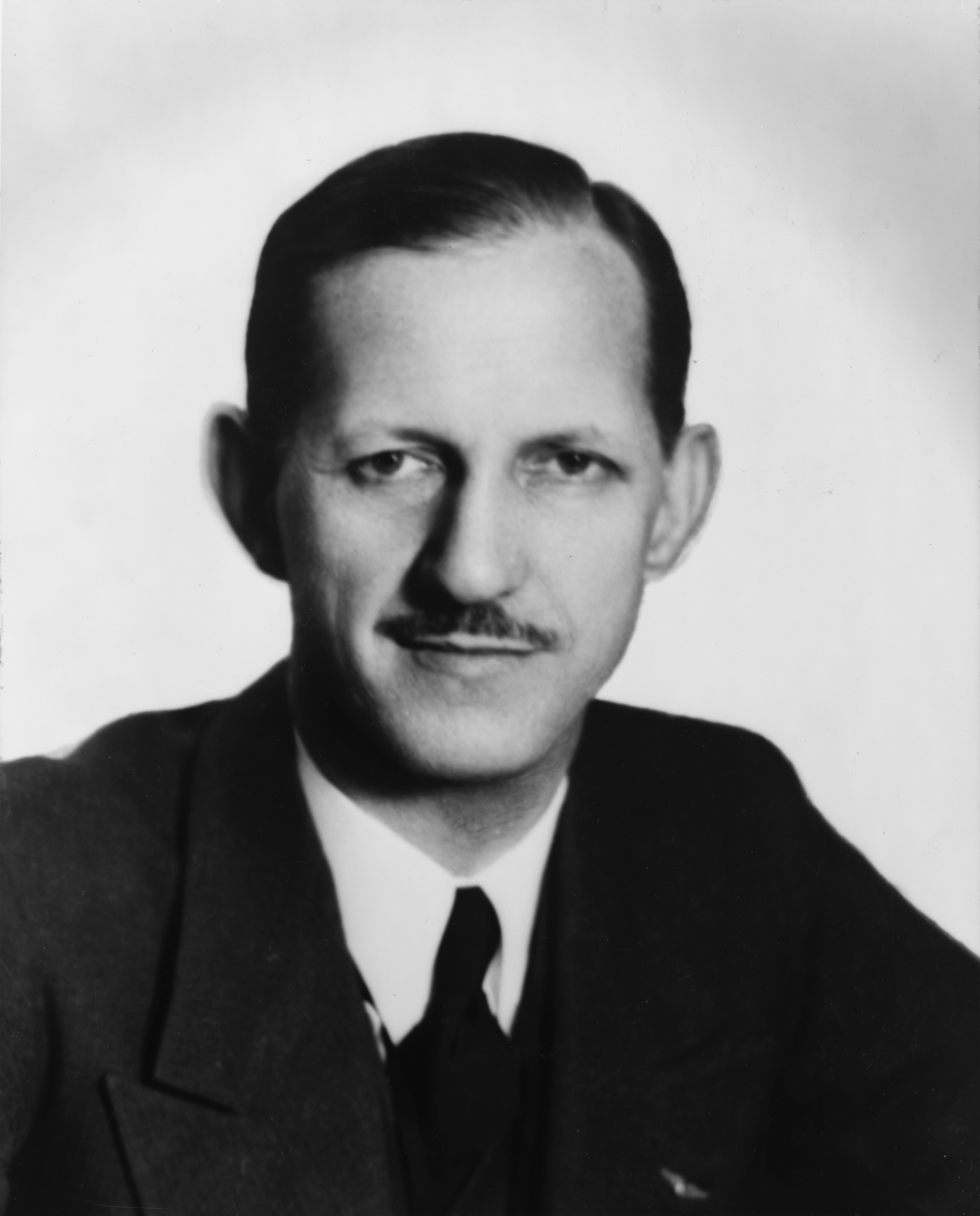

Member of the U.S. House of Representatives from Michigan's 15th district
- In office March 4, 1933 – September 19, 1955
- Preceded by: District established
- Succeeded by: John Dingell Jr.

Personal details
- Born: John David Dingell; February 2, 1894 Detroit, Michigan, U.S.
- Died: September 19, 1955 (aged 61) Washington, D.C., U.S.
- Party: Democratic
- Spouse: Grace Blossom Bigler
- Children: 4, including John
- Relatives: Christopher Dingell (grandson); Debbie Dingell (daughter-in-law)

John David Dingell Sr. (/ˈdɪŋɡəl/ DING-gəl; February 2, 1894 – September 19, 1955) was an American politician who represented Michigan's 15th congressional district from 1933 to 1955. He was a member of the Democratic Party. He was the father of the longest-serving member of Congress, U.S. Representative John Dingell Jr.

== Early life ==
Dingell was born in Detroit, Michigan, the son of Marie Ciesielski Opalewska and Joseph A. Dzięglewicz, who were Polish immigrants from Bączal Górny. The family's surname ended up being anglicized to 'Dingell'. A graduate of St. Casimir's Parochial School in Detroit, he worked as a newsboy, printer and newspaperman. He had also engaged in the construction of natural gas pipelines, was a wholesale dealer in beef and pork products and an organizer and trustee of Colorado Springs Labor College.

Dingell married Grace Blossom Bigler (1894–1962) and had four children: John Jr., Patricia Ann, James, and Julè. Patricia Ann, known as Patsy, died shortly after her first birthday. Dingell established his family in Detroit, where he was employed as a printer at the Detroit Free Press and actively participated in labor union organizing. Dingell suffered from asthma and tuberculosis, which caused the family to briefly relocate to Colorado Springs to seek treatment there. There, John Jr. was born in 1926.

== Political career ==
Dingell first ran for office in 1924 when he ran for a seat in the Colorado House of Representatives from El Paso County but was defeated.

Following the 1930 U.S. Census, Michigan gained four new seats in the U.S. House of Representatives. In 1932, Dingell was elected as a Democrat from the newly formed 15th District in western Detroit over former Mayor of Detroit Charles Bowles. He was reelected eleven times and served until his death at Walter Reed Army Hospital in Washington, D.C., at the age of 61. He is interred at the Holy Sepulchre Cemetery in Southfield, Michigan.

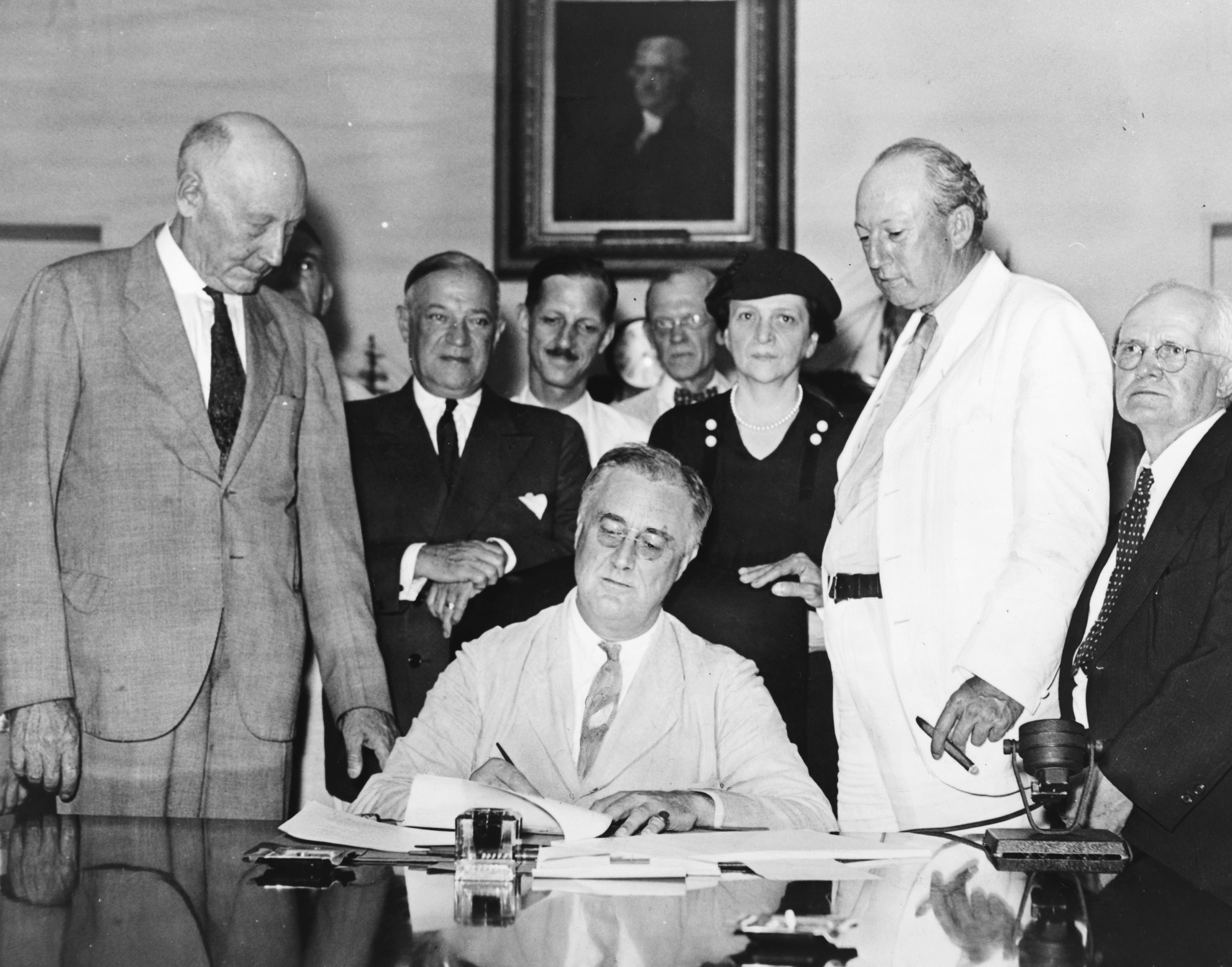
Franklin Roosevelt signing the Social Security Act. Dingell is 3rd from left

At the outset of his Congressional career, Dingell was a "New Deal stalwart." Reflecting the prevailing prejudices of the period, a memorable letter from Dingell to President Franklin D. Roosevelt on August 18, 1941, suggested that ten thousand Japanese-Hawaiian Americans be incarcerated in order to ensure "good behavior" from Japan. Following the Japanese attack on Pearl Harbor on December 7, 1941, Dingell demanded that Admiral Husband E. Kimmel and General Walter Short be court-martialed.

== Legacy ==
After the September 19, 1955, death of the elder John Dingell, a special election called to fill the remainder of Dingell's term was won by his son, John Jr., who took his father's place in Congress on December 13, 1955. John Dingell Jr. retired from the House of Representatives as the longest-serving member of Congress in history at 59 years and 21 days and its longest serving Dean at 20 years on January 3, 2015, and his wife Debbie Dingell was elected to succeed him. As of 2025, the three Dingells had represented the southeastern Michigan area for 92 consecutive years.

A hallmark of their service has been a proposal for a national health insurance system, first introduced by John Sr. in 1933 and re-introduced since at every Congress by the father and then the son.

Dingell's grandson, Christopher D. Dingell, has also taken to politics, having been elected to the Michigan State Senate in 1986.

== See also ==
- List of members of the United States Congress who died in office (1950–1999)

U.S. House of Representatives
Preceded by None	United States Representative for the 15th congressional district of Michigan; 1933 – 1955	Succeeded by John Dingell Jr.
