= Norm Shinkle =

American politician (born 1950)

Norman D. Shinkle

Member of the Michigan Senate from the 11th district
- In office January 1, 1983 – December 31, 1990
- Preceded by: James R. DeSana
- Succeeded by: Jim Berryman

Personal details
- Born: 1950 (age 75–76)
- Party: Republican
- Education: University of Toledo (J.D.); Michigan State University

Norman D. "Norm" Shinkle (born 1950) is an American Republican politician from the U.S. state of Michigan and was a member of the Michigan Board of Canvassers.

== Biography ==
Shinkle holds a BA from Michigan State University and a JD from the University of Toledo. Admitted to the State Bar of Michigan, his practice is located in Williamston.

Shinkle was elected to three offices in Monroe County, Michigan including Monroe County Commissioner, Bedford Township Supervisor, and finally the Michigan State Senate. After serving in Senate Leadership, Shinkle was appointed by Governor John Engler, a Republican, to serve as chief judge of the Michigan Tax Tribunal. After leaving the tax tribunal Shinkle ran for other judicial offices, but was not elected. He is deputy chairman of the Michigan Republican Party and a member of the Michigan Republican State Committee.

On April 26, 2012, Shinkle, serving on the state elections Board of Canvassers, along with co-Republican Jeffrey Timmer, voted to reject almost a quarter million voter signatures for a ballot initiative to repeal the Michigan Public Act 4 — Michigan's Emergency Manager law. The two Republicans rejected the petitions, saying that the "font size was not 14 point", despite testimony from the printer that it was. The Republicans ruled that the font size of the letter "N" was smaller than required by state law, thereby invalidating the signatures.

On June 21, 2022, Shinkle resigned from the state elections Board of Canvassers, citing a time-consuming campaign for a seat in the Michigan House of Representatives.

== 2020 election denial ==
On November 23, 2020, as a member of the four-member Michigan Board of Canvassers, Shinkle abstained from certifying the state's 2020 presidential election results, despite the fact that Joe Biden won Michigan by more than 154,000 votes, all 83 counties in Michigan had certified their results, and there was no evidence of wrong-doing.

Shinkle's decision to abstain from certifying Michigan’s election results came after Donald Trump made false claims of fraud in the 2020 election, and efforts were made by Trump allies to get Republican election officials to not certify the results in key states Trump lost. Tim Alberta of Politico described Shinkle's decision to abstain as "a cowardly abdication of duty."

Norm Shinkle’s wife, Mary Shinkle, supported legal efforts to overturn Michigan’s election result. She filed an affidavit in support of a Trump campaign lawsuit alleging voter irregularities in Wayne County, including that poll workers had been “rude” and didn’t allow her to look over their shoulders as they processed ballots. The lawsuit was dropped in late November 2022.

A fellow Republican on the Board of Canvassers, Aaron Van Langeveld, ultimately gave the decisive vote to certify Michigan’s election results. Joe Biden was inaugurated on January 20, 2021.
