= Secretariat on the Responsible Conduct of Research =

Canadian government agency

The Secretariat on the Responsible Conduct of Research (SRCR) is an agency of Canada's federal government that provides ethical oversight in scientific research. The agency was established in 2011 and contains two volunteer panels. It is the successor to a research integrity group established in 1994 and adopted its framework. As of 2019, it has investigated 274 cases, which has resulted in 133 researchers being disciplined for academic misconduct. The organization determines consequences such as funding bans. It mostly relies on affiliated universities to report suspected violations and to do their own internal investigations. Formal complaints are not required for the organization to get involved. The organization has limited transparency and does not release information about the cases it investigates, even where there is police involvement, due to privacy implications. In 2024, when researching the Prince Albert School Study, scientist Janice Parente was told by the organization that it does not oversee privately funded research, which accounts for 85% of research conducted in Canada, and that these research subjects should instead seek recourse through the court system.

== See also ==
- Education in Canada
- United States Office of Research Integrity
