= Roswell B. Rexford =

American politician

Member of the Michigan Senate from the 11th district
- In office January 3, 1855 – December 31, 1856
- Preceded by: Alfred Paddock
- Succeeded by: Perley Bills

Personal details
- Born: Roswell Burrows Rexford; November 29, 1842 Johnsburg, New York
- Died: February 7, 1913 (aged 70) Grand Rapids, Michigan

Roswell Burrows Rexford (November 29, 1842 – February 7, 1913) was an American politician in Michigan.

On November 8, 1854, Rexford was elected to the Michigan Senate where he represented the 11th district from January 3, 1855, to December 31, 1856. During his term in the legislature, he served on the Militia committee and the State Prison committee. Rexford lived in Napoleon, Michigan.
