= James DeSana Sr. =

American politician

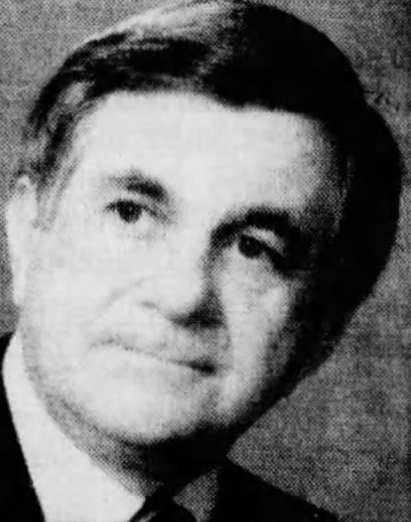
- DeSana in 1987

Mayor of Wyandotte, Michigan
- In office 1961–1968
- In office 1987–1997
- In office 2006–2009

Member of the Michigan Senate from the 11th district
- In office 1976–1983
- Preceded by: John E. McCauley
- Succeeded by: Norm Shinkle

Member of the Michigan Senate from the 7th district
- In office 1983–1986
- Preceded by: Jack Faxon
- Succeeded by: Christopher D. Dingell

Personal details
- Born: October 6, 1930 (age 95) Wyandotte, Michigan, U.S.
- Party: Republican; Democratic
- Children: 5; including James Jr.
- Education: University of Detroit Mercy; Walsh College

James DeSana Sr. (born October 6, 1930), also known as James R. DeSana, is an American politician. A member of the Republican Party and the Democratic Party, he served as mayor of Wyandotte, Michigan from 1961 to 1968, from 1987 to 1997 and from 2006 to 2009 and in the Michigan Senate from 1976 to 1986.

== Life and career ==
DeSana was born in Wyandotte, Michigan. He attended the University of Detroit Mercy, earning his Bachelor of Science degree in business administration and management. He also attended Walsh College, earning his associate's degree.

DeSana served as mayor of Wyandotte, Michigan from 1961 to 1968. After his service as mayor, he served in the Michigan Senate from 1976 to 1986, which after his service in the Senate, he served as mayor again of Wyandotte, from 1987 to 1997, and again from 2005 to 2009.
