= Bączal Górny =

- Village
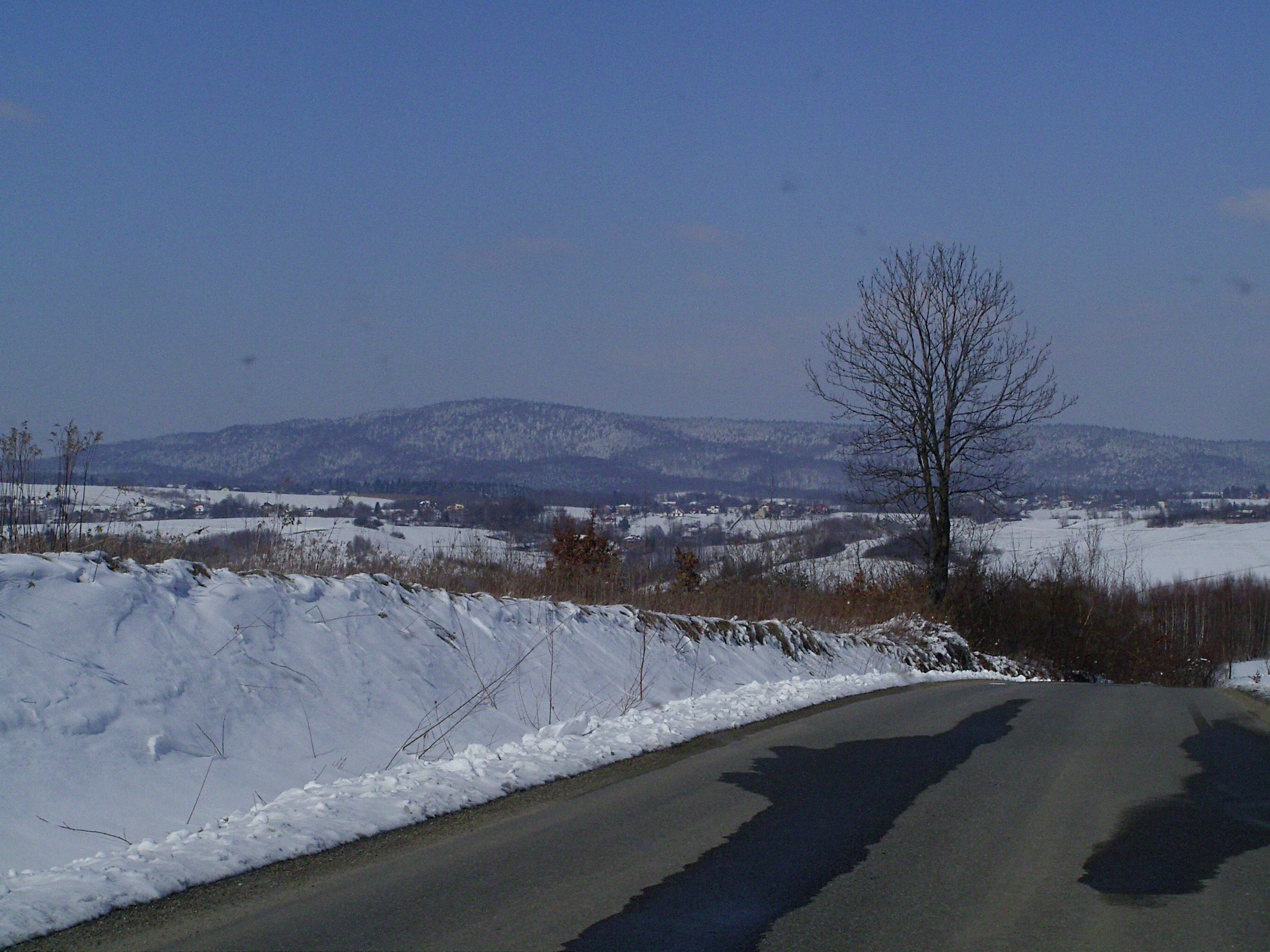
- Bączal Górny and mountain Liwocz

- Location within Poland
- Coordinates: 49°47′N 21°22′E
- Country: Poland
- Voivodeship: Subcarpathian
- County: Jasło
- Gmina: Skołyszyn
- Population: 640

Bączal Górny [ˈbɔnt͡ʂal ˈɡurnɨ] is a village in the administrative district of Gmina Skołyszyn, within Jasło County, Subcarpathian Voivodeship, in south-eastern Poland.

Bączal Górny is the birthplace of Joseph Dzieglewicz, father of John Dingell Sr, and grandfather of John Dingell, both of whom served in the United States Congress.

== Points of interest ==
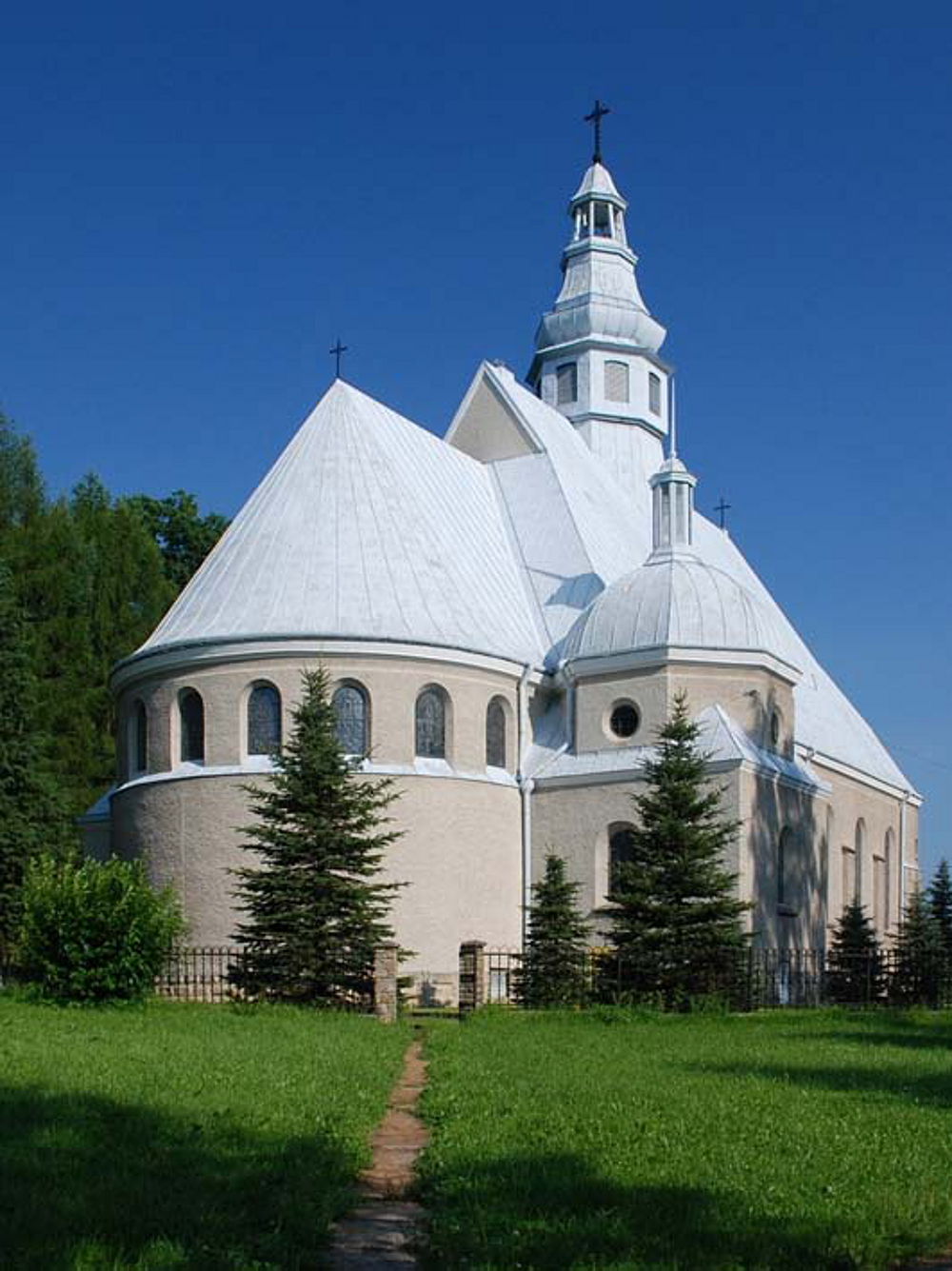
Parish Church of Mary in Bączal Dolny (Lower Bączal), bordering Bączal Górny (Upper Bączal)

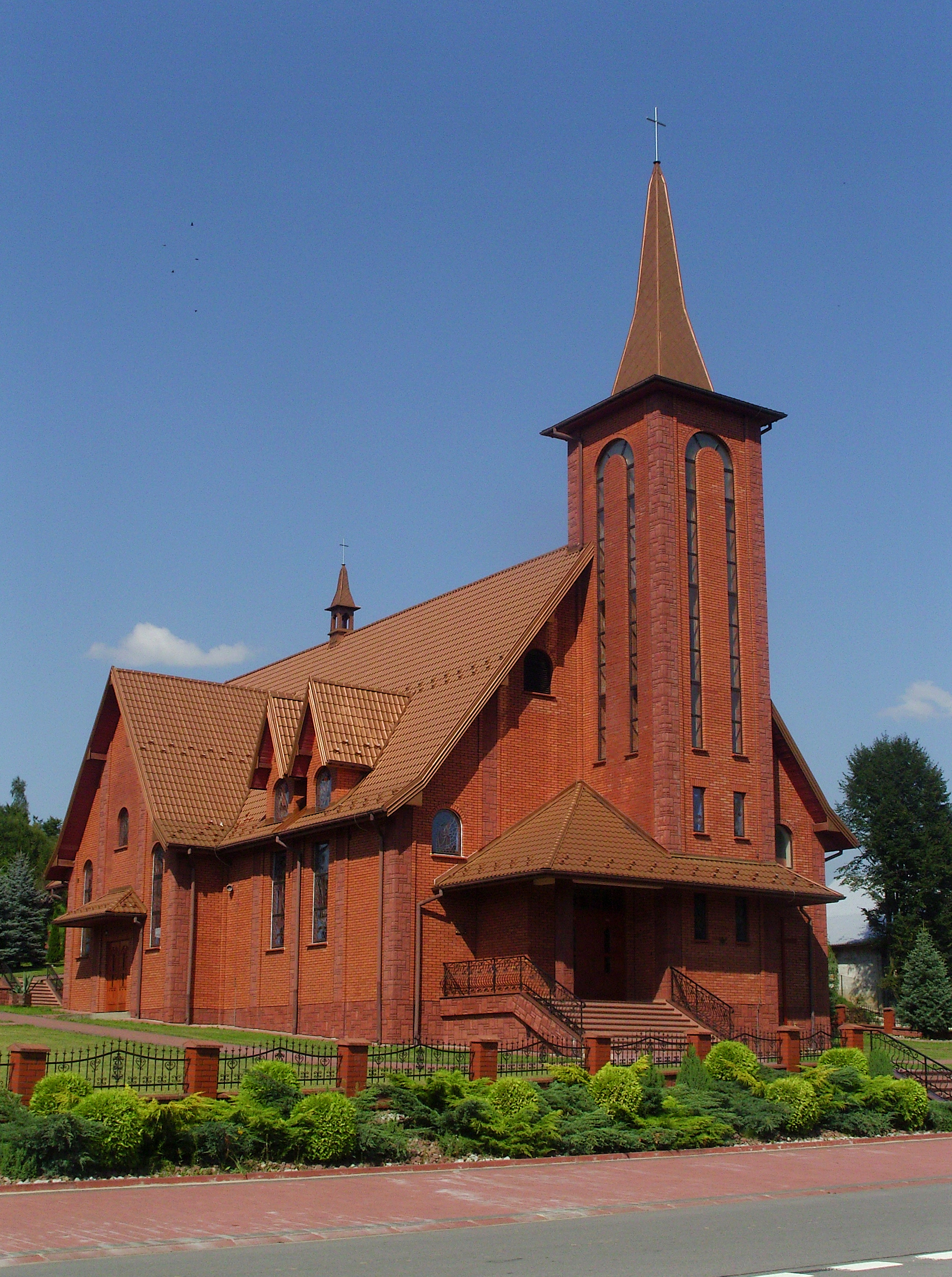
Church of the Virgin Mary administratively in Bączal Dolny until 2003, now part of Jabłonica
