= United States Office of Research Integrity =

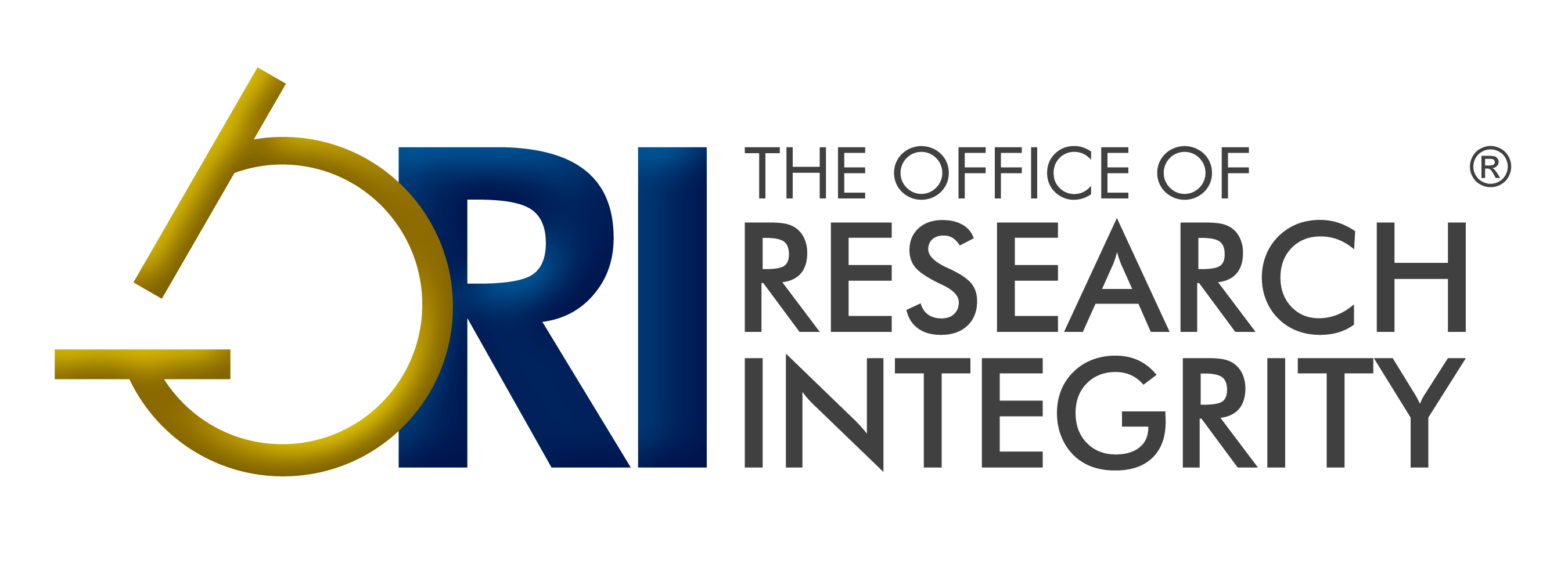

The Office of Research Integrity (ORI) is a U.S. government agency that focuses on research integrity, especially in health. It was created when the Office of Scientific Integrity (OSI) in the National Institutes of Health (NIH) and the Office of Scientific Integrity Review (OSIR) in the Office of the Assistant Secretary for Health merged in May 1992. The Office of Research Integrity oversees and directs Public Health Service (PHS) research integrity activities on behalf of the Secretary of Health and Human Services, except for the regulatory research integrity activities of the Food and Drug Administration. Organizationally, ORI is located within the Office of the Assistant Secretary for Health (OASH) within the Office of the Secretary of Health and Human Services (OS), in the Department of Health and Human Services (HHS).

== Activities ==
ORI carries out its responsibility by:

- Developing policies, procedures and regulations related to the detection, investigation, and prevention of research misconduct and the responsible conduct of research;
- Reviewing and monitoring research misconduct investigations conducted by applicant and awardee institutions, intramural research programs, and the Office of Inspector General in the Department of Health and Human Services (HHS);
- Recommending research misconduct findings and administrative actions to the Assistant Secretary for Health for decision, subject to appeal;
- Assisting the Office of the General Counsel (OGC) to present cases before the HHS Departmental Appeals Board;
- Providing technical assistance to institutions that respond to allegations of research misconduct;
- Implementing activities and programs to teach the responsible conduct of research, promote research integrity, prevent research misconduct, and improve the handling of allegations of research misconduct;
- Conducting policy analyses, evaluations and research to build the knowledge base in research misconduct, research integrity, and prevention and to improve HHS research integrity policies and procedures;
- Administering programs for: maintaining institutional assurances, responding to allegations of retaliation against whistleblowers, approving intramural and extramural policies and procedures, and responding to Freedom of Information Act and Privacy Act of 1974 requests.

In FY 2004, the PHS provided at least $30 billion for health research and development, primarily in the biomedical and behavioral sciences through its extramural and intramural programs. (Extramural programs provide funding to research institutions that are not part of the Federal government of the United States - medical schools, universities, colleges, hospitals, research institutes. Intramural programs provide funding for research conducted within Federal government facilities.)

== Scientific fraud hearings of late 1980s-early 1990s ==
The Office of Scientific Integrity conducted a number of investigations of scientists and researchers in the late 1980s-early 1990s; the result of concerns about scientific misconduct in the early 1980s. This also caught the attention of John Dingell, at the time a high-ranking member of the United States House of Representatives; culminating in a "Scientific McCarthyism" against perceived cases of fraud. After new NIH head Bernadine Healy was questioned in these hearings, a review process was created to improve due process for the accused. Canadian journalist Malcolm Gladwell, at the time a reporter for The Washington Post, revisited the news coverage and propriety of the investigations in 2018, via two episodes of Season 3 of the Revisionist History podcast.

== See also ==
- EASE Guidelines for Authors and Translators of Scientific Articles, including a publication ethics checklist for authors (for routine use during manuscript submission to a journal)
- David Baltimore and Thereza Imanishi-Kari: prominent researchers targeted in the OSI/Dingell hearings, cleared later in the 1990s.
- Secretariat on the Responsible Conduct of Research, Canada
