= Michigan's 11th Senate district =

American legislative district

Michigan's 11th State Senate district
Senator
Veronica Klinefelt; D–Eastpointe
- Demographics: 67.4% White; 21.6% Black; 2.7% Hispanic; 2.8% Asian; 0.1% Native American; 0.3% Other; 5% Multiracial
- Population (2024): 259,330

Michigan's 11th Senate district is one of 38 districts in the Michigan Senate. The 11th district was created by the 1850 Michigan Constitution, as the 1835 constitution only permitted a maximum of eight senate districts. It has been represented by Democrat Veronica Klinefelt since 2023, succeeding fellow Democrat Jeremy Moss.

== Geography ==
District 11 encompasses parts of Macomb and Wayne counties.

=== 2011 Apportionment Plan ===
District 11, as dictated by the 2011 Apportionment Plan, covered the inner suburbs of Detroit in Oakland County, including Southfield, Farmington Hills, Oak Park, Ferndale, Madison Heights, Farmington, Lathrup Village, Huntington Woods, Hazel Park, Pleasant Ridge, and Royal Oak Township.

The district was largely located within Michigan's 14th congressional district, also extending into the 9th and 11th districts. It overlapped with the 26th, 27th, 35th, and 37th districts of the Michigan House of Representatives.

== List of senators ==
Senator	Party	Dates	Residence	Notes
Alfred Paddock	Whig	1853–1854	Concord	
Roswell B. Rexford	Republican	1855–1856	Napoleon	
Perley Bills	Republican	1857–1858	Tecumseh	
Joel Carpenter	Republican	1859–1862	Blissfield	
Thomas F. Moore	Republican	1863–1864	Adrian	
Andrew Howell	Republican	1865–1866	Adrian	
Victory P. Collier	Republican	1867–1868	Battle Creek	
John C. Fitzgerald	Republican	1869–1870	Marshall	
Philip H. Emerson	Republican	1871–1872	Battle Creek	
Abraham C. Prutzman	Republican	1873–1874	Three Rivers	
Matthew T. Garvey	Republican	1875–1876	Cassopolis	
Gilbert E. Read	Republican	1877–1878	Richland	
Ebenezer Lakin Brown	Republican	1879–1880	Schoolcraft	
Enos T. Lovell	Republican	1881–1882	Climax	
Lawson A. Duncan	Republican	1883–1884	Niles	
Harvey C. Sherwood	Democratic	1885–1886	Watervliet	
George N. Potter	Republican	1887–1888	Potterville	
Philip T. Colgrove	Republican	1889–1890	Hastings	
William Miller	Democratic	1891–1892	Eaton Rapids	
Robert E. French	Republican	1893–1896	Fort Gratiot	
Charles H. Westcott	Republican	1897–1898	St. Clair	
George W. Moore	Republican	1899–1902	Port Huron	
George N. Jones	Republican	1903–1906	Marine City	
Burt D. Cady	Republican	1907–1908	Port Huron	
James E. Weter	Republican	1909–1912	Richmond	
David A. Fitzgibbon	Republican	1913–1916	Port Huron	
Lyman A. Holmes	Republican	1917–1920	Romeo	
John W. Smith	Republican	1921–1924	Port Huron	
Charles E. Greene	Republican	1925–1928	Richmond	
Alexander Cowan	Republican	1929–1932	Port Huron	
Theodore C. Ruff	Democratic	1933–1934	St. Clair	
Christian F. Matthews	Republican	1935–1938	Mount Clemens	
Gilbert H. Isbister	Republican	1939–1942	Port Huron	
Ivan A. Johnston	Republican	1943–1946	Mount Clemens	
Bruce F. Clothier	Republican	1947–1950	North Branch	
Frank D. Beadle	Republican	1951–1954	St. Clair	
Fred Nicholson	Democratic	1955–1956	Warren	
George C. Steeh	Democratic	1957–1962	Mount Clemens	
John T. Bowman	Democratic	1963–1964	Roseville	
John E. McCauley	Democratic	1965–1975	Wyandotte	Died in office.
James R. DeSana	Democratic	1976–1982	Wyandotte	
Norm Shinkle	Republican	1983–1990	Lambertville	
Jim Berryman	Democratic	1991–1994	Adrian	
Ken DeBeaussaert	Democratic	1995–2002	Chesterfield Township	
Alan Sanborn	Republican	2003–2010	Richmond	
Jack Brandenburg	Republican	2011–2014	Harrison Township	
Vincent Gregory	Democratic	2015–2018	Southfield	
Jeremy Moss	Democratic	2019–2022	Southfield	
Veronica Klinefelt	Democratic	2023–present	Eastpointe	

== Recent election results ==
=== 2020s ===
2026 Michigan Senate election
Primary election
Party	Candidate	Votes	%
Democratic	Veronica Klinefelt (incumbent)	17,636	56.62
Democratic	Alysha Johnson	10,090	32.39
Democratic	Joseph Michael Hunt	3,423	10.99
Total votes		31,149	100
Republican	Johnnie S. Townsend	14,476	100
Total votes		14,476	100
General election
Democratic	Veronica Klinefelt (incumbent)	68,242	61.7
Republican	Johnnie S. Townsend	42,368	38.3
Total votes		110,610	100
Democratic hold			

2022 Michigan Senate election, District 11
Primary election
Party	Candidate	Votes	%
Democratic	Veronica Klinefelt	13,414	62.5
Democratic	Monique Owens	8,056	37.5
Total votes		21,470	100
General election
Democratic	Veronica Klinefelt	56,119	52.7
Republican	Mike MacDonald (incumbent)	50,395	47.3
Total votes		106,514	100
Democratic hold			

=== 2018 ===
2018 Michigan Senate election, District 11
Primary election
Party	Candidate	Votes	%
Democratic	Jeremy Moss	26,447	51.7
Democratic	Crystal Bailey	10,839	21.2
Democratic	Vanessa Moss	9,446	18.5
Democratic	James Turner	4,375	8.6
Total votes		51,107	100
General election
Democratic	Jeremy Moss	99,916	76.7
Republican	Boris Tuman	27,157	20.8
Libertarian	James Young	3,180	2.4
Total votes		130,253	100
Democratic hold			

=== 2014 ===
2014 Michigan Senate election, District 11
Primary election
Party	Candidate	Votes	%
Democratic	Vincent Gregory (incumbent)	10,286	34.7
Democratic	Vicki Barnett	10,168	34.3
Democratic	Ellen Lipton	9,204	31.0
Total votes		29,658	100
General election
Democratic	Vincent Gregory (incumbent)	70,862	73.3
Republican	Boris Tuman	22,846	23.6
Libertarian	James Young	2,994	3.1
Total votes		96,702	100
Democratic hold			

=== Federal and statewide results ===
Year	Office	Results
2020	President	Biden 74.0 – 24.7%
2018	Senate	Stabenow 74.6 – 23.7%
2018	Governor	Whitmer 75.8 – 22.1%
2016	President	Clinton 71.5 – 24.6%
2014	Senate	Peters 75.2 – 22.1%
2014	Governor	Schauer 64.6 – 34.0%
2012	President	Obama 73.5 – 25.8%
2012	Senate	Stabenow 76.1 – 21.3%

== Historical district boundaries ==
Map	Description	Apportionment Plan	Notes
	Monroe County; Wayne County (part); Brownstown Township; Gibraltar; Grosse Ile Township; Riverview (part); Rockwood; Sumpter Township; Taylor Township (part); Trenton; Wyandotte	1964 Apportionment Plan	
	Monroe County; Washtenaw County (part); Milan (part); Wayne County (part); Brownstown Township; Flat Rock; Gibraltar; Grosse Ile Township; Huron Township; Riverview; Rockwood; Trenton; Woodhaven; Wyandotte (part)	1972 Apportionment Plan	
	Lenawee County; Monroe County; Wayne County (part); Saline Township	1982 Apportionment Plan	
	Macomb County (part); Chesterfield Township; Clinton Township; Harrison Township; Lake Township; Lenox Township; Mount Clemens; New Baltimore; Richmond; St. Clair Shores	1992 Apportionment Plan	
	Macomb County (part); Armada Township; Bruce Township; Chesterfield Township; Harrison Township; Lenox Township; Macomb Township; Memphis (part); Mount Clemens; New Baltimore; Ray Township; Richmond (part); Richmond Township; Shelby Township; Washington Township	2001 Apportionment Plan	
	Oakland County (part); Farmington; Farmington Hills; Ferndale; Hazel Park; Huntington Woods; Lathrup Village; Madison Heights; Oak Park; Pleasant Ridge; Royal Oak Township; Southfield	2011 Apportionment Plan	
