= Veronica Klinefelt =

American politician (born 1964)

Member of the Michigan Senate from the 11th district
- Incumbent
- Assumed office January 1, 2023
- Preceded by: Jeremy Moss (redistricting)

Macomb County Commissioner from the 3rd district
- In office 2013–2022

Personal details
- Born: January 15, 1964 (age 62) Lawrence, Kansas
- Party: Democratic
- Spouse: Randy
- Children: 4
- Education: Wayne State University; Macomb Community College
- Website: https://senatedems.com/klinefelt/

Veronica Klinefelt (born January 15, 1964) is an American politician who is the state senator representing Michigan's 11th Senate district, following the 2022 Michigan Senate election. She is a member of the Democratic Party.

== Political career ==
Klinefelt began her political career as a member of the East Detroit School Board, serving for six years. She then served on the Eastpointe City Council for eight years, which included terms as Mayor Pro Tem. She served on the Macomb County Board of Commissioners for ten years.

=== Michigan Senate ===
In 2022, Klinefelt ran against Michael D. MacDonald (who was the incumbent in Michigan's 10th Senate district) in Michigan's 11th Senate district. MacDonald was redistricted to the 11th Senate district following the 2020 United States redistricting cycle. Klinefelt defeated MacDonald in the general election with 52.69% of the vote, due to strong support in her native Eastpointe as well as in the Wayne County portion of her district.

== Electoral history ==
2022 Michigan's 11th Senate district election
Party	Candidate	Votes	%
Democratic	Veronica Klinefelt	56,119	52.69%
Republican	Mike MacDonald (incumbent)	50,395	47.31%
Total votes		106,514	100%
