= Thereza Imanishi-Kari =

Brazilian associate professor of pathology (born 1943)

- Born: 1943 (age 82–83); Indaiatuba, Brazil
- Occupation: Associate Professor of Pathology
- Years active: 1981-Present
- Known for: Research on autoimmune diseases

Thereza Imanishi-Kari is an associate professor of pathology at Tufts University. Her research focuses on the origins of autoimmune diseases, particularly systemic lupus erythematosus, studied using mice as model organisms. Previously she had been a faculty member at the Massachusetts Institute of Technology. She is notable for her role in what became known as the "Baltimore affair", in which a 1986 paper she co-authored with David Baltimore was the subject of research misconduct allegations. Following a series of investigations, she was eventually exonerated of the charges in 1996.

== Early life and education ==
A native of Brazil, Thereza Imanishi-Kari earned a BS degree in biology from the University of São Paulo near her home town of Indaiatuba, Brazil. Subsequently, she studied at Kyoto University, in Kyoto, Japan, and the University of Helsinki in Finland, which awarded her a PhD in the field of immunogenetics.

== Research ==
Imanishi-Kari's research focuses on immunology, particularly on understanding the molecular and cell biology underlying the development of autoimmune disease. She studies systemic lupus erythematosus using mouse models and has been funded for this work by the Lupus Research Institute and the National Institutes of Health. Her interest in immunology was motivated in part by her sister's death due to lupus.

== Investigation and exoneration ==
In 1986, Imanishi-Kari co-authored a scientific paper on immunology with David Baltimore. The paper, published in the scientific journal Cell, showed unexpected results on how the immune system rearranges its genes to produce antibodies against antigens it encounters for the first time. Margot O'Toole, a researcher in Imanishi-Kari's lab, claimed she could not reproduce some of the experiments in the paper and accused Imanishi-Kari of fabricating the data. Since the research had been funded by the U.S. federal government through the National Institutes of Health (NIH), the matter was taken up by the United States Congress, where it was aggressively pursued by, among others, Representative John Dingell. Largely on the basis of these findings, NIH's fraud unit, then called the Office of Scientific Integrity, accused Dr. Imanishi-Kari in 1991 of falsifying data and recommended she be barred from receiving research grants for 10 years.

In 1996, a newly constituted U.S. Department of Health and Human Services (HHS) appeals panel reviewed the case again and dismissed all charges against Imanishi-Kari. In August 1996 she gained an official position as an assistant professor in the pathology department of the Tufts University School of Medicine. There was widespread criticism of the government's system for dealing with allegations of misconduct, and calls for review of the oversight procedures dealing with the integrity of biomedical research. The case of alleged scientific misconduct and her exoneration was reported in Scientific American. A New York Times editorial at the time described the final result of the ten-year investigation as "embarrassment for the Federal Government and belated vindication for the accused scientist".

The high profile of the case resulted in a great deal of published commentary on the matter. The New York Times published an account of the medical establishment's treatment of O’Toole on March 22, 1991. Mathematician Serge Lang discussed the case in an article published in the journal Ethics and Behavior in January 1993. Several books, including The Baltimore Case (1998) by Daniel Kevles of Yale University and The Great Betrayal: Fraud in Science by science historian Horace Freeland Judson, also covered the Baltimore affair.
