= Carolyn Cheeks Kilpatrick =

American politician (1945–2025)

Carolyn Kilpatrick
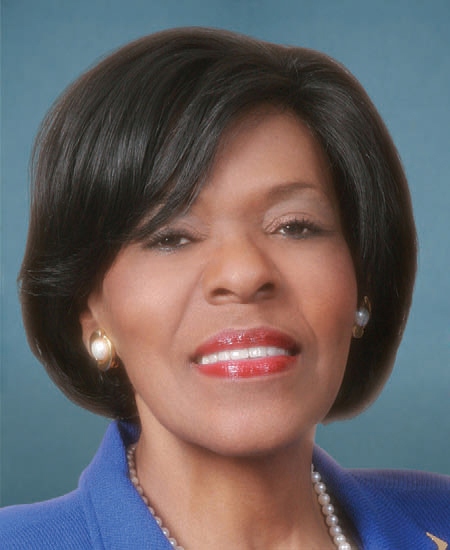
- Official portrait, c. 2009

Member of the U.S. House of Representatives from Michigan
- In office January 3, 1997 – January 3, 2011
- Preceded by: Barbara-Rose Collins
- Succeeded by: Hansen Clarke
- Constituency: 15th district (1997–2003); 13th district (2003–2011)

Member of the Michigan House of Representatives
- In office January 1, 1979 – January 1, 1997
- Preceded by: Jackie Vaughn III
- Succeeded by: Kwame Kilpatrick
- Constituency: 18th district (1979–1982); 8th district (1983–1992); 9th district (1993–1996)

Personal details
- Born: Carolyn Jean Cheeks; June 25, 1945 Detroit, Michigan, U.S.
- Died: October 7, 2025 (aged 80) Fayetteville, Georgia, U.S.
- Party: Democratic
- Spouse: Bernard Kilpatrick (m. 1968; div. 1981)
- Children: 2, including Kwame
- Education: Ferris State University (attended); Western Michigan University (BS); University of Michigan (MS)

Carolyn Jean Cheeks Kilpatrick (June 25, 1945 – October 7, 2025) was an American politician who was a U.S. representative from 1997 to 2011, first for Michigan's 15th congressional district and then for Michigan's 13th congressional district. She was a member of the Democratic Party. In August 2010 she lost the Democratic primary election to Hansen Clarke, who replaced her in January 2011 after winning the 2010 general election. Kilpatrick was also the mother of former Detroit Mayor Kwame Kilpatrick.

== Early life, education and career ==
Born Carolyn Jean Cheeks in Detroit on June 25, 1945, she graduated from Detroit High School of Commerce. She then attended Ferris State University in Big Rapids from 1968 to 1970 and earned a B.S. from Western Michigan University (Kalamazoo) in 1972. She earned a M.S. from the University of Michigan in 1977. She worked as a high school teacher and was later a member of the Michigan House of Representatives from 1979 to 1996. While serving in the Michigan House, she became the first African-American woman to serve on the Michigan House Appropriations Committee.

== U.S. House of Representatives ==
=== Committee assignments ===
- Committee on Appropriations
  - Subcommittee on Transportation, Housing and Urban Development, and Related Agencies

=== Caucus and other membership ===
- Canada-United States Inter-Parliamentary Group
- Congressional Black Caucus
- Congressional Progressive Caucus

She was one of the 31 House Democrats who voted not to count the 20 electoral votes from Ohio in the 2004 presidential election. Republican President George Bush won the state by 118,457 votes.

The Congressional Black Caucus unanimously chose Kilpatrick as its chairwoman for the 110th Congress (2007-09).

On September 29, 2008, she voted against the Emergency Economic Stabilization Act of 2008.

== Political campaigns ==
In 1996, Kilpatrick challenged three-term incumbent Barbara-Rose Collins in the 1996 Democratic primary for what was then the 15th District. She defeated Collins by a shocking margin, taking 51.6 percent of the vote to Collins' 30.6 percent. This was tantamount to election in this heavily Democratic, black-majority district. She was reelected six times, never dropping below 80 percent of the vote. Her district was renumbered as the 13th District after the 2000 Census. She faced no major-party opposition in 2004 and was completely unopposed in 2006.

=== 2008 ===
Her first serious opposition came during the 2008 primary—the real contest in this district—when she was challenged by both former State Representative Mary D. Waters and State Senator Martha Scott in the Democratic primary. Kilpatrick's campaign was plagued by the controversy surrounding her son and his involvement in a text messaging sex scandal. On the August 5 primary election, Kilpatrick won with 39.1 percent of the vote, compared to Waters' 36 percent and Scott's 24 percent.

=== 2010 ===
In 2010, she was again challenged in the Democratic primary. Unlike in 2008, her opposition coalesced around State Senator Hansen Clarke, who defeated her in the August 3 primary. “This is the final curtain: the ending of the Kilpatrick dynasty,” said Detroit political consultant Eric Foster of Foster, McCollum, White and Assoc. NPR and CBS News both noted that throughout her re-election campaign, she was dogged by questions about her son, Kwame Kilpatrick, who is in prison on numerous corruption charges. Michigan Live reported that her election defeat could in part be attributed to the Kwame Kilpatrick scandals.

== Personal life and death ==
Kilpatrick was a member of the Detroit Substance Abuse Advisory Council, and was a member of Delta Sigma Theta sorority.

Kilpatrick was married to Bernard Nathaniel Kilpatrick from 1968 until divorcing in 1981. The couple had two children, daughter Ayanna and son Kwame Kilpatrick, a former Mayor of Detroit. She had six grandsons including two sets of twins and two granddaughters. Both her former husband and son were on trial, under an 89-page felony indictment. On March 11, 2013, her son was found guilty on 24 of 30 federal charges and her former spouse was found guilty on 1 of 4 federal charges.

Kilpatrick lived in Metro Atlanta in her later years, and died from Alzheimer's disease at her daughter's home in Fayetteville, Georgia, on October 7, 2025, at the age of 80.

== Electoral history ==
Michigan's 13th congressional district general election, 2008
Party	Candidate	Votes	%
Democratic	Carolyn Cheeks Kilpatrick (inc.)	167,481	74.13
Republican	Edward J. Gubics	43,098	19.08
Green	George L. Corsetti	9,579	4.24
Libertarian	Gregory Creswell	5,764	2.55
Total votes		225,922	100.00

Michigan's 13th district Democratic primary, August 3, 2010
Party	Candidate	Votes	%
Democratic	Hansen Clarke	22,573	47.32
Democratic	Carolyn Cheeks Kilpatrick (incumbent)	19,507	40.89
Democratic	Glenn Plummer	2,038	4.27
Democratic	John Broad	1,872	3.92
Democratic	Vincent Brown	893	1.87
Democratic	Stephen Hume	820	1.72
Total votes		47,703	100.00

== See also ==
- List of African-American United States representatives
- Women in the United States House of Representatives

U.S. House of Representatives
Preceded by Barbara-Rose Collins	Member of the U.S. House of Representatives from Michigan's 15th congressional district 1997–2003	Succeeded by John Dingell
Preceded by Lynn Rivers	Member of the U.S. House of Representatives from Michigan's 13th congressional district 2003–2011	Succeeded by Hansen Clarke
Preceded by Mel Watt	Chair of the Congressional Black Caucus; 2007–2009	Succeeded by Barbara Lee
