= Jim Berryman =

American politician

Mayor of Adrian, Michigan
- In office 1985–1990
- In office 2013–2017

Member of the Michigan Senate
- In office 1991–1998
- Preceded by: Norm Shinkle
- Succeeded by: Beverly S. Hammerstrom
- Constituency: 11th district (1991–1994); 17th district (1995–1998)

Personal details
- Born: February 17, 1947 (age 79)
- Party: Democratic
- Education: Adrian College

Jim Berryman (born February 17, 1947) is a politician from the U.S. state of Michigan. He is the former mayor of Adrian, Michigan. He previously served as a member of the Michigan Senate, where he represented the 11th district from 1991 to 1994, and the 17th district from 1995 to 1998. He served as mayor of Adrian, Michigan, from 1985 to 1990. He is a Democrat and was the first one ever to be elected to the Michigan Senate from Lenawee County. Again, in 2013 Berryman was elected mayor of Adrian (2013-2017).

== Early life ==
Berryman was born on February 17, 1947, and attended Adrian College from 1965 to 1969.

== 2012 Michigan House of Representatives campaign ==
On January 6, 2012, Berryman announced his candidacy for the 57th district seat in the Michigan House of Representatives. He ran against the incumbent, Republican Nancy Jenkins. On August 7, 2012, Berryman defeated Harvey Schmidt in the Democratic Party 57th district primary.

In the election on November 6, 2012, Berryman was defeated by Nancy Jenkins.

== Personal ==
Berryman lives in Adrian with his wife Susan. They have three children. His granddaughter, Olivia Berryman, graduated Summa Cum Laude from Pepperdine University in Malibu, CA. He is also a member and former president of the Adrian Rotary Club.
