= Michigan's 15th congressional district =

Former U.S. House district from 1933 to 2013

Coordinates: 42°0′N 83°30′W

- Obsolete district
- Created: 1930
- Eliminated: 2010
- Years active: 1933–2013

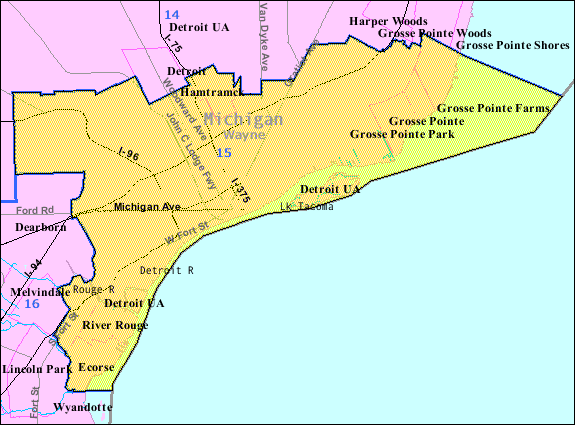
The district from 1993 to 2003

The district from 2003 to 2013

Michigan's 15th congressional district is an obsolete congressional district in the state of Michigan.

Historically, the district's politics have been dominated by the Dingell family since its creation after the 1930 United States census. Its first congressman, John D. Dingell Sr., was elected in 1932 and served until his death in 1955. His son, John Jr. won a special election to succeed him; upon Dingell Jr.'s own retirement in 2015, his wife Debbie Dingell won his seat and is now the incumbent. As such, the district (even after it was absorbed by the 12th district in 2013) has been represented continuously by a Dingell for the past 92 years.

The 15th district historically had left-of-center voting tendencies. Its last Cook PVI rating was D+13, meaning it supported Democratic candidates at a rate of 13 percentage points greater than the national average.

This district became obsolete for the 113th Congress in 2013 as congressional district lines were redrawn to accommodate the loss of the seat due to reapportionment as a result of the 2010 census. Most of the district's territory, including Ann Arbor and Dingell's home in Dearborn, became part of the new 12th district, which had previously been based in Oakland, and Macomb Counties.

Along with the 1st district and the now-defunct 16th district, the 15th has been historically frequently represented by politicians of Polish descent. Three of the district's six elected representatives (Dingell Jr. served here twice and in between he was a representative from the 16th district, which was later dissolved) have been Polish-Americans.

== Major cities from 2003 to 2013 ==
- Ann Arbor
- Dearborn
- Taylor
- Dearborn Heights
- Inkster
- Romulus
- Ypsilanti
- Monroe

== Voting ==
Election results from presidential races
Year	Office	Results
2008	President	Obama 66 – 33%
2004	President	Kerry 62 – 38%
2000	President	Gore 60 – 38%
1996	President	Clinton 87 – 10%
1992	President	Clinton 82 – 13%

== List of representatives ==
Representative	Party	Tenure	Cong ress	Election history
District created March 4, 1933
John Dingell Sr. (Detroit)	Democratic	March 4, 1933 – September 19, 1955	73rd 74th 75th 76th 77th 78th 79th 80th 81st 82nd 83rd 84th	Elected in 1932. Re-elected in 1934. Re-elected in 1936; Re-elected in 1938. Re-elected in 1940. Re-elected in 1942. Re-elected in 1944. Re-elected in 1946. Re-elected in 1948. Re-elected in 1950. Re-elected in 1952. Re-elected in 1954. Died.
Vacant		September 19, 1955 – December 13, 1955	84th	
John Dingell (Detroit)	Democratic	December 13, 1955 – January 3, 1965	84th 85th 86th 87th 88th	Elected to finish his father's term. Re-elected in 1956. Re-elected in 1958. Re-elected in 1960. Re-elected in 1962. Redistricted to the 16th district.
William D. Ford (Taylor)	Democratic	January 3, 1965 – January 3, 1993	89th 90th 91st 92nd 93rd 94th 95th 96th 97th 98th 99th 100th 101st 102nd	Elected in 1964. Re-elected in 1966. Re-elected in 1968. Re-elected in 1970. Re-elected in 1972. Re-elected in 1974. Re-elected in 1976. Re-elected in 1978. Re-elected in 1980. Re-elected in 1982. Re-elected in 1984. Re-elected in 1986. Re-elected in 1988. Re-elected in 1990. Redistricted to the 13th district.
Barbara-Rose Collins (Detroit)	Democratic	January 3, 1993 – January 3, 1997	103rd 104th	Redistricted from the 13th district and re-elected in 1992. Re-elected in 1994. Lost renomination.
Carolyn Cheeks Kilpatrick (Detroit)	Democratic	January 3, 1997 – January 3, 2003	105th 106th 107th	Elected in 1996. Re-elected in 1998. Re-elected in 2000. Redistricted to the 13th district.
John Dingell (Dearborn)	Democratic	January 3, 2003 – January 3, 2013	108th 109th 110th 111th 112th	Redistricted from the 16th district and re-elected in 2002. Re-elected in 2004. Re-elected in 2006. Re-elected in 2008. Re-elected in 2010. Redistricted to the 12th district.
District eliminated January 3, 2013
