= John Dingell =

American politician (1926–2019)

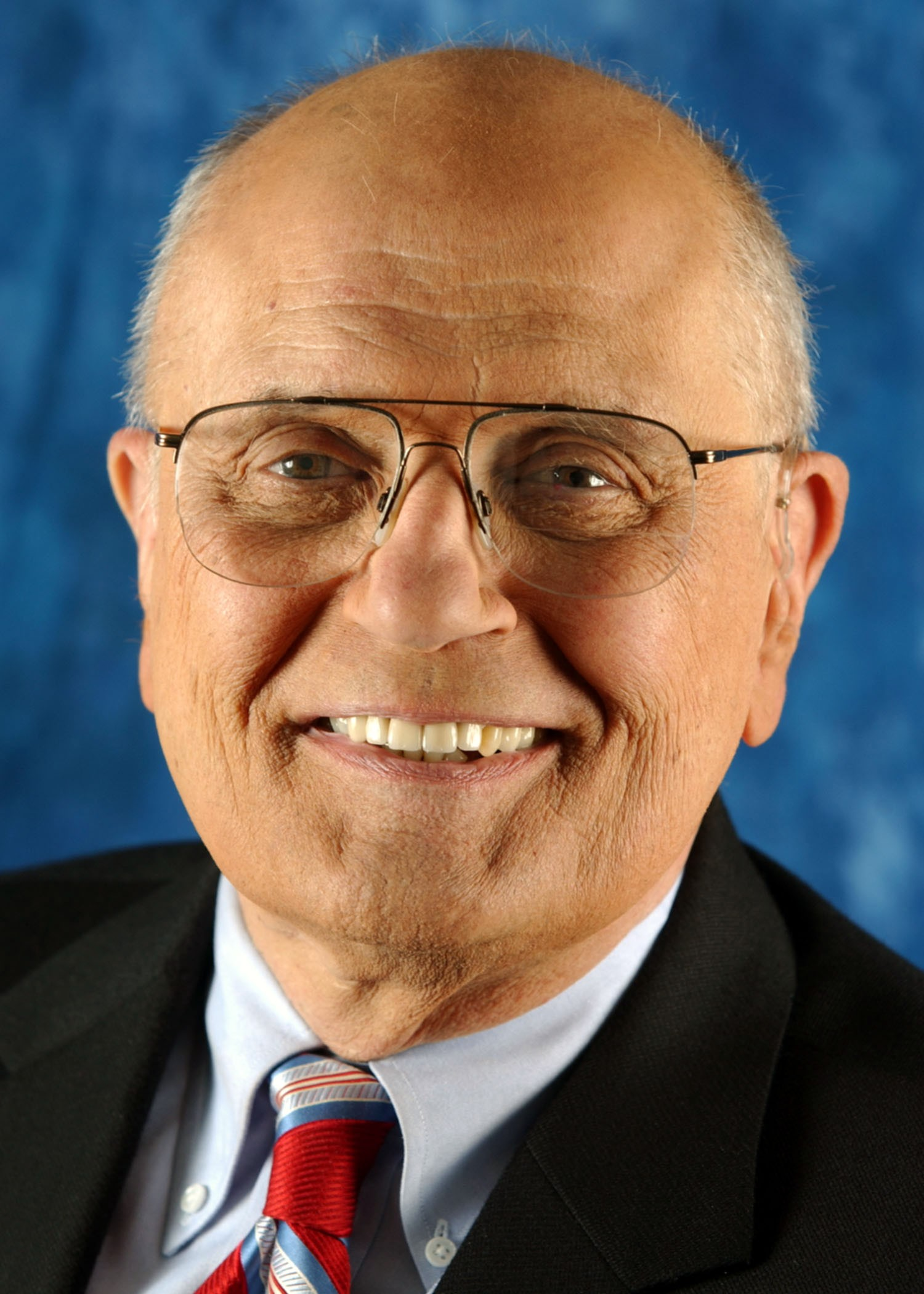
- Official portrait, 2009

43rd Dean of the United States House of Representatives
- In office January 3, 1995 – January 3, 2015
- Preceded by: Jamie Whitten
- Succeeded by: John Conyers

Member of the U.S. House of Representatives from Michigan
- In office December 13, 1955 – January 3, 2015
- Preceded by: John Dingell Sr.
- Succeeded by: Debbie Dingell
- Constituency: 15th district (1955–1965; 2003–2013); 16th district (1965–2003); 12th district (2013–2015)

Chair of the House Energy and Commerce Committee
- In office January 3, 2007 – January 3, 2009
- Preceded by: Joe Barton
- Succeeded by: Henry Waxman
- In office January 3, 1981 – January 3, 1995
- Preceded by: Harley Orrin Staggers
- Succeeded by: Thomas J. Bliley Jr.

Personal details
- Born: John David Dingell Jr. July 8, 1926 Colorado Springs, Colorado, US
- Died: February 7, 2019 (aged 92) Dearborn, Michigan, US
- Resting place: Arlington National Cemetery
- Party: Democratic
- Spouses: Helen Henebry (m. 1952; div. 1972) Debbie Insley (m. 1981)
- Children: 4, including Christopher
- Parent: John Dingell Sr. (father)
- Education: Georgetown University (BS, JD)

Military service
- Branch/service: United States Army
- Years of service: 1944–1946
- Rank: Second lieutenant
- Battles/wars: World War II
- John Dingell's voice Dingell, as chair of the House Energy and Commerce Committee, opens debate on the Clean Air Act Amendments of 1990; Recorded May 21, 1990

John David Dingell Jr. (/ˈdɪŋɡəl/ DING-gəl; July 8, 1926 – February 7, 2019) was an American politician from the state of Michigan who served as a member of the United States House of Representatives from 1955 until 2015. A member of the Democratic Party, Dingell holds the record as the longest-serving member of Congress in American history.

Born in Colorado Springs, Colorado, Dingell attended Georgetown University, where he earned a Bachelor of Science in chemistry in 1949 and a Juris Doctor in 1952. Dingell began his congressional career by succeeding his father, John Dingell Sr., as representative for Michigan's 15th congressional district on December 13, 1955. A longtime member of the House Energy and Commerce Committee, Dingell chaired the committee from 1981 to 1995 and from 2007 to 2009. He was Dean of the House of Representatives from 1995 to 2015. Dingell was instrumental in the passage of the Medicare Act, the Water Quality Act of 1965, the Clean Water Act of 1972, the Endangered Species Act of 1973, the Clean Air Act of 1990, and the Affordable Care Act, among other laws. He also helped to pass the Civil Rights Act of 1964. Dingell was one of the final two World War II veterans to have served in Congress; the other was Texas Representative Ralph Hall.

Dingell announced on February 24, 2014, that he would not seek reelection to a 31st term in Congress. His wife, Debbie Dingell, successfully ran to succeed him in the 2014 election. President Barack Obama awarded Dingell the Presidential Medal of Freedom in 2014. Dingell left office on January 3, 2015.

== Early life, education, and early career ==
Dingell was born on July 8, 1926, in Colorado Springs, Colorado, the son of Grace (née Bigler) and John Dingell Sr. (1894–1955). His father was the son of Polish immigrants, and his mother had Swiss and Scots-Irish ancestry. The Dingells were in Colorado in search of a cure for Dingell Sr.'s tuberculosis. The Dingell surname had been Dzięglewicz, and was Americanized by John Dingell Sr.'s father.

The family moved back to Michigan, and in 1932, Dingell Sr. was elected the first representative of Michigan's newly created 15th District. In Washington, D.C., John Jr. attended Georgetown Preparatory School and then the House Page School when he served as a page for the U.S. House of Representatives from 1938 to 1943. He was on the floor of the House when President Franklin D. Roosevelt gave his famous speech after the bombing of Pearl Harbor. In 1944, at the age of 18, Dingell joined the United States Army. He rose to the rank of second lieutenant and received orders to take part in the first wave of a planned invasion of Japan in November 1945; the Congressman said that President Harry S. Truman's decision to use the atomic bomb to end the war saved his life.

Dingell attended Georgetown University in Washington, D.C., receiving a Bachelor of Science in chemistry in 1949 and a Juris Doctor in 1952. He was a lawyer in private practice, a research assistant to U.S. District Court judge Theodore Levin, a congressional employee, a forest ranger, and assistant prosecuting attorney for Wayne County until 1955.

== U.S. House of Representatives ==
=== Tenure ===
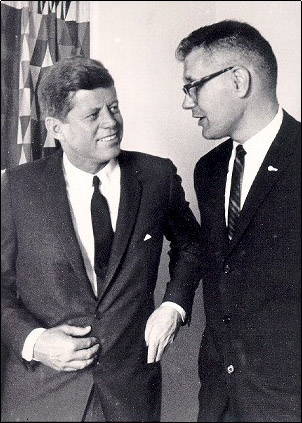
Rep. Dingell with President John F. Kennedy

Dingell was sworn in as a member of the U.S. House of Representatives on December 13, 1955.

Dingell was instrumental in the passage of the Medicare Act, the Water Quality Act of 1965, the Clean Water Act of 1972, the Endangered Species Act of 1973, the Clean Air Act of 1990, and the Affordable Care Act, among others. He also helped to pass the Civil Rights Act of 1964. During his tenure in Congress, he voted in favor of the 1957 Civil Rights Act, the Civil Rights Act of 1960, the Civil Rights Act of 1964, and the Civil Rights Act of 1968. He voted as well for the 24th Amendment to the U.S. Constitution and the Voting Rights Act of 1965.

Dingell was generally classified as a moderately liberal member of the Democratic Party. Throughout his career he was a leading congressional supporter of organized labor, social welfare measures and traditional progressive policies. At the beginning of every Congress, Dingell introduced a bill providing for a national health insurance system, the same bill that his father proposed while he was in Congress. Dingell also strongly supported Bill Clinton's managed-care proposal early in his administration. In October 1998, President Clinton began a Roosevelt Room appearance "by thanking Senator Jay Rockefeller of West Virginia and Congressman Dingell for their steadfast support of Medicare and their participation in our Medicare Commission."

On some issues, though, Dingell reflected the values of his largely Catholic and working-class district. He supported the Vietnam War until 1971. While he supported all of the civil rights bills, he opposed expanding school desegregation to Detroit suburbs via mandatory busing. He took a fairly moderate position on abortion. He worked to balance clean air legislation with the need to protect manufacturing jobs. As well, in the early 1980s, he was a prominent politician who used "Japan bashing", blaming "little yellow men" for domestic automakers' misfortune, further fostering anti-Japanese racism in Detroit and contributing to the environment that led to the Killing of Vincent Chin, an American man of Chinese descent killed in the Detroit suburbs by two autoworkers who mistakenly thought he was Japanese.

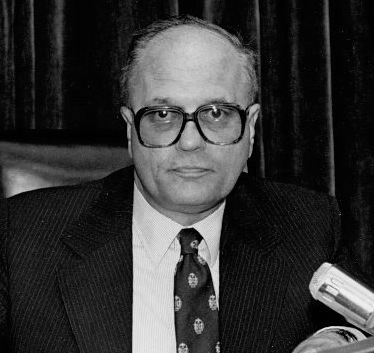
Dingell in the 80s

An avid sportsman and hunter, he strongly opposed gun control, and was a former board member of the National Rifle Association of America. For many years, Dingell received an A+ rating from the NRA. Dingell helped make firearms exempt from the 1972 Consumer Product Safety Act so that the Consumer Product Safety Commission had no authority to recall defective guns. Dingell's wife, Representative Debbie Dingell, introduced legislation in 2018 to remove this exemption from the law.

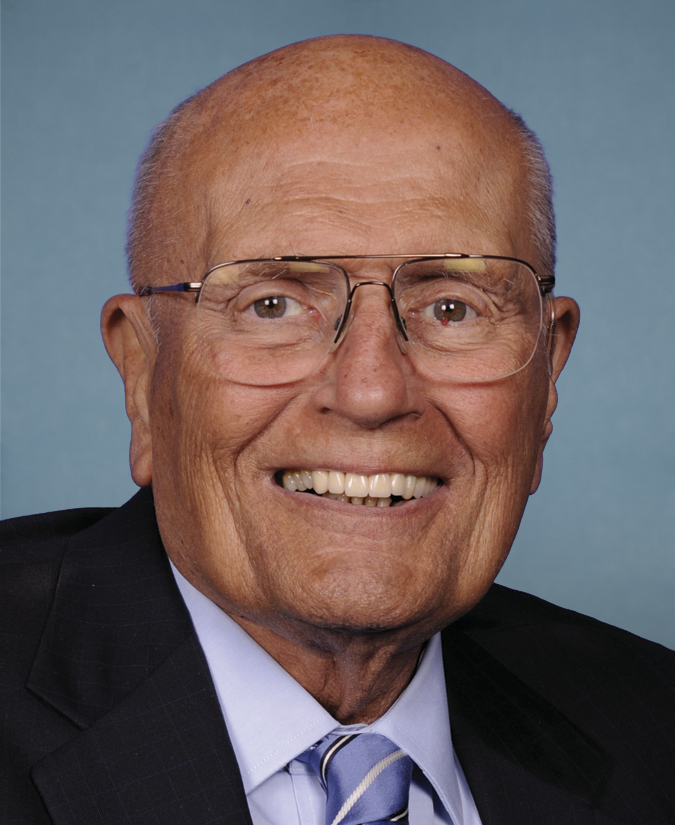
Dingell in 2010

Michael Barone wrote of Dingell in 2002:

There is something grand about the range of Dingell's experience and about his adherence to his philosophy over a very long career. He is an old-fashioned social Democrat who knows that most voters don't agree with his goals of a single-payer national health insurance plan but presses forward toward that goal as far as he can. "It's hard to believe that there was once no Social Security or Medicare," he says. "The Dingell family helped change that. My father worked on Social Security and for national health insurance, and I sat in the chair and presided over the House as Medicare passed (in 1965). I went with Lyndon Johnson for the signing of Medicare at the Harry S. Truman Library, and I have successfully fought efforts to privatize Social Security and Medicare." Whether you agree or disagree, the social Democratic tradition is one of the great traditions in our history, and John Dingell has fought for it for a very long time.

Dingell was Dean of the House of Representatives from 1995 to 2015.

On December 15, 2005, on the floor of the House, Dingell read a poem sharply critical of, among other things, Fox News, Bill O'Reilly, and the so-called "War on Christmas". Along with John Conyers, in April 2006, Dingell brought an action against George W. Bush and others alleging violations of the Constitution in the passing of the Deficit Reduction Act of 2005. The case (Conyers v. Bush) was ultimately dismissed for lack of standing.

After winning re-election in 2008 for his 28th consecutive term, Dingell surpassed the record for having the longest tenure in the history of the House of Representatives on February 11, 2009. In honor of the record, Michigan Governor Jennifer Granholm declared February 11, 2009, to be John Dingell Day.

Dingell was one of the final two World War II veterans to have served in Congress; the other was Texas Representative Ralph Hall.

Dingell left office on January 3, 2015. As of that date, Dingell had served with 2,453 different U.S. Representatives in his career. Dingell served in Congress for more than 59 years, retiring as the longest-tenured member of Congress in the history of the United States. His wife, Debbie Dingell, successfully ran to succeed him in the 2014 election.

==== Energy and Commerce chairman ====
A longtime member of the House Energy and Commerce Committee, Dingell chaired the committee from 1981 to 1995 and from 2007 to 2009.

Dingell was well known for his approach to congressional oversight of the executive branch. He subpoenaed numerous government officials to testify before the committee and grilled them for hours. He insisted that all who testified before his committee do so under oath, thus exposing them to perjury charges if they did not tell the truth. He and his committee uncovered numerous instances of corruption and waste, such as the use of $600 toilet seats at the Pentagon. He also claimed that the committee's work led to resignations of many Environmental Protection Agency officials, and uncovered information that led to legal proceedings that sent many Food and Drug Administration officials to jail.

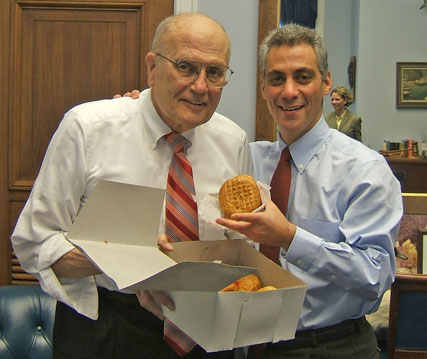
Dingell and Rahm Emanuel with pączki in 2006

After serving as the committee's ranking Democratic member for 12 years, Dingell regained the chairmanship in 2007. According to Newsweek, he had wanted to investigate the George W. Bush Administration's handling of port security, the Medicare prescription drug program and Dick Cheney's energy task force. Time magazine has stated that he had intended to oversee legislation that addresses global warming and climate change caused by carbon emissions from automobiles, energy companies and industry.

Dingell lost the chairmanship for the 111th Congress to Congressman Henry Waxman of California in a Democratic caucus meeting on November 20, 2008. Waxman mounted a challenge against Dingell on grounds that Dingell was stalling certain environmental legislation, which would have tightened vehicle emissions standards—something that could be detrimental to the Big Three automobile manufacturers that constitute a major source of employment in Dingell's district. Dingell was given the title of Chairman Emeritus in a token of appreciation of his years of service on the committee, and a portrait of him is in the House collection.

==== Baltimore case ====
In the 1980s, Dingell led a series of congressional hearings to pursue alleged scientific fraud by Thereza Imanishi-Kari and Nobel Prize-winner David Baltimore. The National Institutes of Health's fraud unit, then called the Office of Scientific Integrity, charged Imanishi-Kari in 1991 of falsifying data and recommended that she be barred from receiving research grants for 10 years. She appealed the decision and the Department of Health and Human Services appeals panel dismissed the charges against Imanishi-Kari and cleared her to receive grants. The findings and negative publicity surrounding them made David Baltimore decide to resign as president of Rockefeller University (after Imanishi-Kari was cleared he became president of the California Institute of Technology). The story of the case is described in Daniel Kevles' 1998 book The Baltimore Case, in a chapter of Horace Freeland Judson's 2004 book The Great Betrayal: Fraud In Science, in a 1993 study by Serge Lang, updated and reprinted in his book Challenges, and in Kevan Mackay's 2025 documentary 17 Pages.

==== Robert Gallo claims ====
From 1991 to 1995 Dingell's staff investigated claims that Robert Gallo had used samples supplied to him by Luc Montagnier to fraudulently claim to have discovered the AIDS virus. The report concluded that Gallo had engaged in fraud and that the NIH covered up his misappropriation of work by the French team at the Institut Pasteur. The report contended that:

The real inventors of the HIV blood test were the (Pasteur) scientists. Even more important, the CDC data, together with the extensive data already accumulated by the (Pasteur) scientists, showed that the (Pasteur) virus—discovered long before the putative LTCB virus—was the cause of AIDS.

The report was never formally published as a subcommittee report because of the 1995 change in control of the House from Democratic to Republican. Other accusations against Gallo were dropped, and while Montagnier's group is considered to be the first to isolate the virus, Gallo's has been recognized as first to prove that this virus was the cause of AIDS.

==== Environment ====
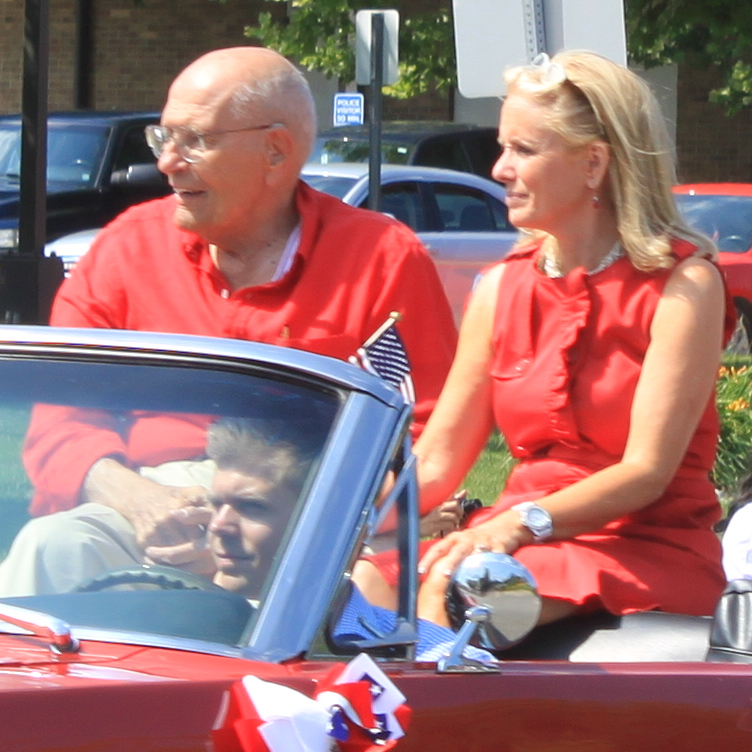
John and Debbie Dingell at the 2011 Ypsilanti Independence Day Parade

Dingell was a member of the Congressional Wildlife Refuge Caucus.

Dingell opposed raising mandatory automobile fuel efficiency standards, which he helped to write in the 1970s. Instead, he indicated that he intended to pursue a regulatory structure that takes greenhouse gas emissions and oil consumption into account. In a July 2007 interview with The Hill, he said "I have made it very plain that I intend to see to it that CAFE is increased" and pointed out that his plan would have Corporate Average Fuel Economy (CAFE) standards increased tantamount to those in the Senate bill recently passed. In November 2007, working with House Speaker Nancy Pelosi, Dingell helped draft an energy bill that would mandate 40% increase in fuel efficiency standards.

In June 1999, Dingell released a report in which the General Accounting Office cited concurrent design and construction was the reason for production of high levels of explosive benzene gas. In a statement, Dingell asserted that "mismanagement by the United States Department of Energy and Westinghouse led to an extraordinary, and pathetic, waste of taxpayer money. All we have to show for $500 million is a 20-year delay and the opportunity to risk another $1 billion to make a problematic process work."

In July 2007, Dingell indicated he planned to introduce a new tax on carbon usage in order to curtail greenhouse gas emissions. The policy has been criticized by some, as polling numbers show voters may be unwilling to pay for the changes. A Wall Street Journal editorial claimed that vehicle emissions standards that he supported will not yield any substantial greenhouse gas emissions savings.

As one of his final votes, Dingell voted against the Keystone XL pipeline on November 13, 2014.

==== Private sector ties ====
Dingell was closely tied to the automotive industry, as he represented Metro Detroit, where the Big Three automakers of General Motors, Chrysler, and the Ford Motor Company, are headquartered. Dingell encouraged the companies to improve fuel efficiency. During the automotive industry crisis of 2008–10, Dingell advocated for the bailout the companies received. During the electoral span of 1989 through 2006, intermediaries for the aforementioned corporations contributed more than $600,000 to Dingell's campaigns. Dingell also held an unknown quantity, more than $1 million in 2005, in assets through General Motors stock options and savings-stock purchase programs; his wife, Debbie Dingell, is a descendant of one of the Fisher brothers, founders of Fisher Body, a constituent part of General Motors. She worked as a lobbyist for the corporation until they married. She then moved to an administrative position there.

=== Committee assignments ===
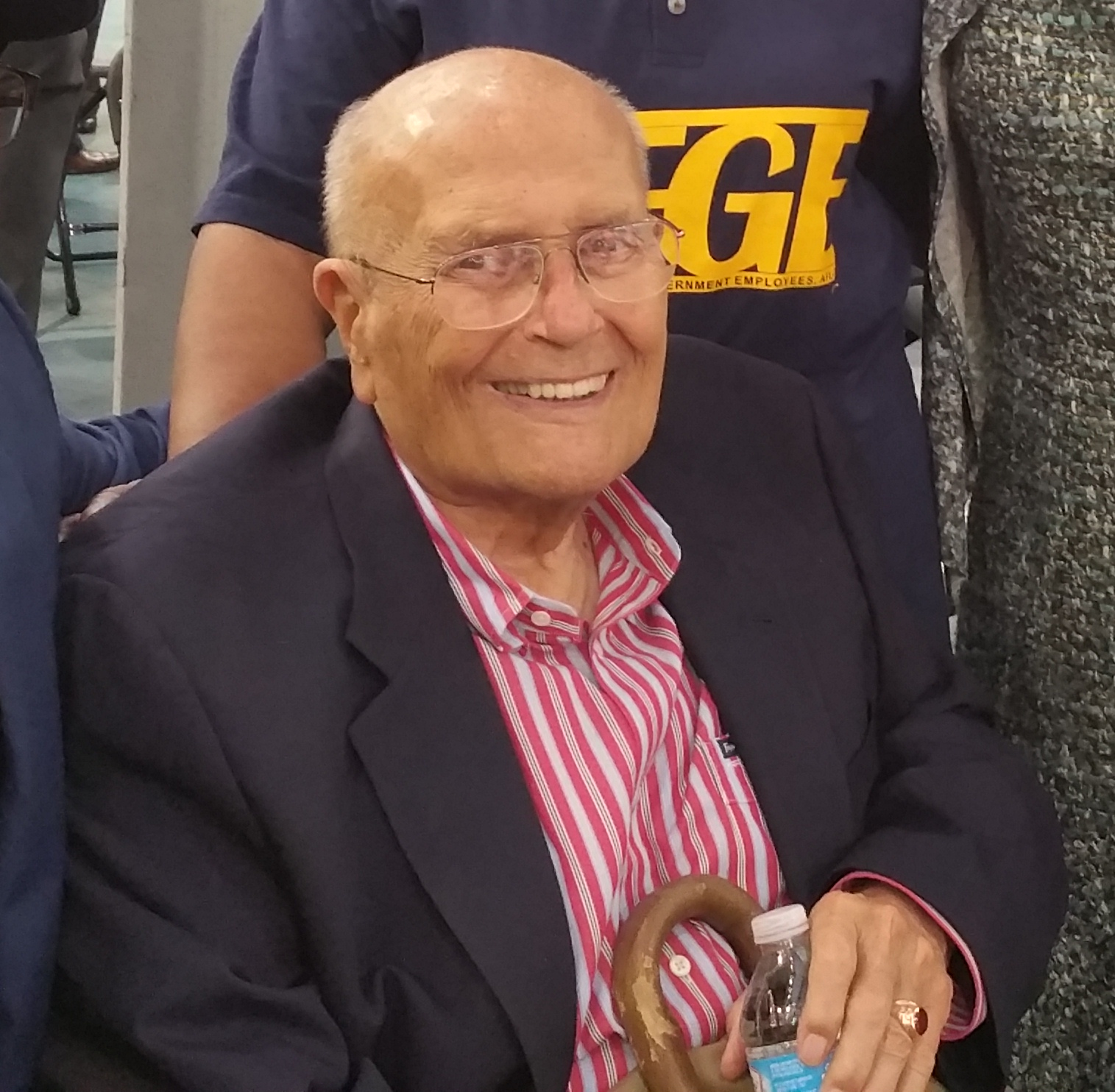
Dingell in October 2016, campaigning in support of Hillary Clinton's presidential bid

- Committee on Energy and Commerce
  - Subcommittee on Commerce, Manufacturing and Trade
  - Subcommittee on Communications and Technology
  - Subcommittee on Energy and Power (ex officio)
  - Subcommittee on Environment and Economy
  - Subcommittee on Health
  - Subcommittee on Oversight and Investigations (ex officio)

== Electoral history ==
=== Election summary ===
In 1955, Dingell's father, John Dingell Sr., died. Dingell, a Democrat, won a special election to succeed him. He won a full term in 1956 and was re-elected 29 times, including runs in 1988 and 2006 with no Republican opponent. Dingell received less than 62% of the vote on only two occasions. In 1994 when the Republican Revolution swept the Republicans into the majority in the House of Representatives for the first time since 1954, Dingell received 59% of the vote. In 2010 when the Republicans re-took control of the House of Representatives, Dingell received 57% of the vote. Between them, he and his father represented the southeastern Michigan area for 80 years. His district was numbered as the 15th District from 1955 to 1965, when redistricting merged it into the Dearborn-based 16th District; in the primary that year, he defeated 16th District incumbent John Lesinski Jr.

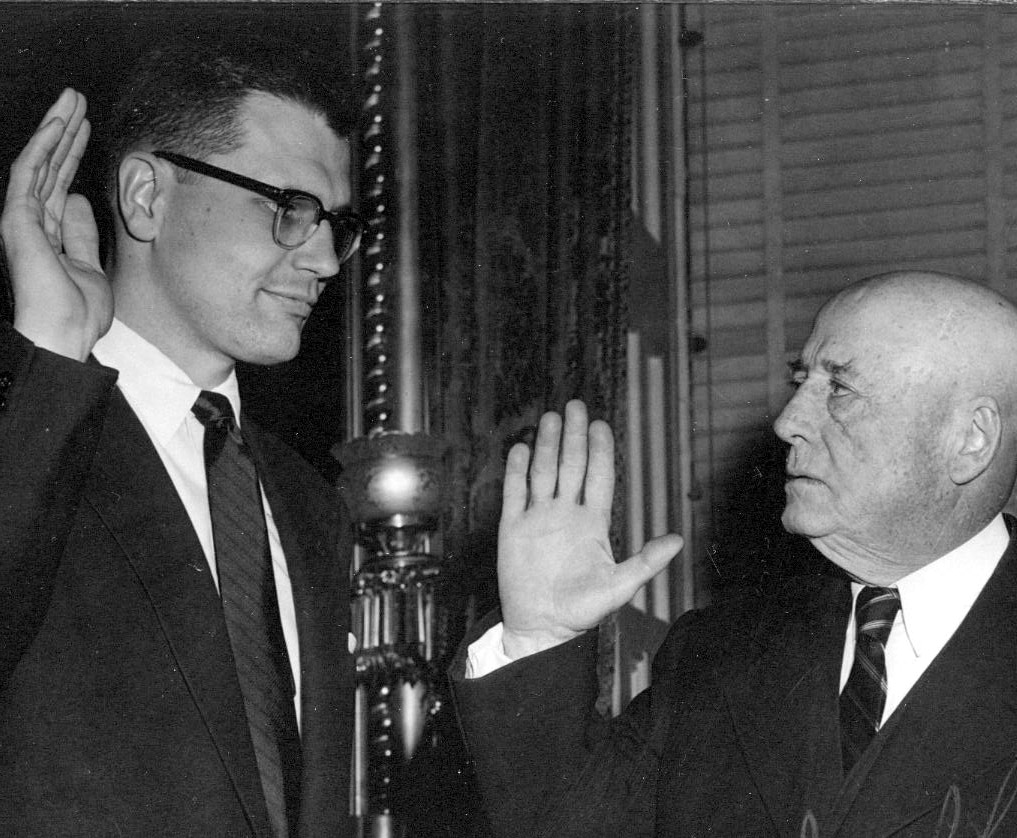
Dingell sworn in by Speaker Sam Rayburn in 1955

In 2002, redistricting merged Dingell's 16th District with the Washtenaw County and western Wayne County–based 13th District, represented by fellow Democratic Representative Lynn Rivers, whom Dingell also bested in the Democratic primary. The 15th District for the 109th Congress included Wayne County suburbs generally southwest of Detroit, the Ann Arbor and Ypsilanti areas in Washtenaw County, and all of Monroe County. For many years, Dingell represented much of western Detroit itself, though Detroit's declining population and the growth of its suburbs pushed all of Detroit into the districts of fellow Democratic representatives, including John Conyers. Dingell always won re-election by double-digit margins.

Dingell announced on February 24, 2014, that he would not seek re-election to a 31st term in Congress.

Michigan's 15th congressional district: Results 1956–1962
| Year | Democrat | Votes | % | Republican | Votes | % | Third Party | Party | Votes | % | Third Party | Party | Votes | % |
|---|---|---|---|---|---|---|---|---|---|---|---|---|---|---|
| 1956 | John Dingell | 111,827 | 77% | Larry Middleton | 33,973 | 23% | Roxann Higgs | Prohibition | 206 | 0% | | | | |
| 1958 | John Dingell | 79,216 | 78% | Austin Curtis | 21,414 | 21% | Charles Aranoff | Socialist Labor | 199 | 0% | Estelle Tripp | Prohibition | 98 | 0% |
| 1960 | John Dingell | 111,671 | 79% | Robert Robbins | 28,532 | 20% | Hiram Coffman | Prohibition | 207 | 0% | Joseph Koss | Socialist Labor | 114 | 0% |
| 1962 | John Dingell | 94,197 | 83% | Ernest Richard | 19,258 | 17% | | | | | | | | |

Michigan's 16th congressional district: Results 1964–2000
| Year | Democrat | Votes | % | Republican | Votes | % | Third Party | Party | Votes | % | Third Party | Party | Votes | % | Third Party | Party | Votes | % |
|---|---|---|---|---|---|---|---|---|---|---|---|---|---|---|---|---|---|---|
| 1964 | John Dingell | 112,763 | 73% | Monte Bona | 40,673 | 26% | Henry Austin | Socialist Workers | 189 | 0% | | | | | | | | |
| 1966 | John Dingell | 71,787 | 63% | John Dempsey | 42,738 | 37% | | | | | | | | | | | | |
| 1968 | John Dingell | 105,690 | 74% | Monte Bona | 37,000 | 26% | Henry Austin | Socialist Workers | 369 | 0% | | | | | | | | |
| 1970 | John Dingell | 90,540 | 79% | William Rostrom | 23,867 | 21% | | | | | | | | | | | | |
| 1972 | John Dingell | 110,715 | 68% | William Rostrom | 48,414 | 30% | Peter Gayner | American Independent | 3,554 | 2% | | | | | | | | |
| 1974 | John Dingell | 95,834 | 78% | Wallace English | 25,248 | 20% | Virginia Crawford | American Independent | 1,605 | 1% | Donald Bechler | Socialist Workers | 365 | 0% | Lewis Steinhardt | U.S. Labor | 232 | 0% |
| 1976 | John Dingell | 121,682 | 76% | William Rostron | 36,378 | 23% | Buck Slayter | American Independent | 1,009 | 1% | Samuel Hancock | Libertarian | 484 | 0% | Susan Dalto | U.S. Labor | 463 | 0% |
| 1978 | John Dingell | 93,387 | 70% | Melvin Heuer | 26,827 | 22% | Harry Hengy | American Independent | 1,889 | 2% | | | | | | | | |
| 1980 | John Dingell | 105,844 | 70% | Pamella Seay | 42,735 | 28% | R. Scott Davidson | Libertarian | 1,810 | 1% | Ronald Slote | American Independent | 1,069 | 1% | | | | |
| 1982 | John Dingell | 114,006 | 74% | David Haskins | 39,227 | 25% | Susan Apstein | Socialist Workers | 1,071 | 1% | Paul Scherrer | Workers League | 450 | 0% | | | | |
| 1984 | John Dingell | 121,463 | 64% | Frank Grzywacki | 68,116 | 36% | Donald Kostyu | Libertarian | 1,042 | 1% | | | | | | | | |
| 1986 | John Dingell | 101,659 | 78% | Frank Grzywacki | 28,971 | 22% | | | | | | | | | | | | |
| 1988 | John Dingell | 132,775 | 97% | No candidate | | | Russell Leone | Workers Against Concessions | 3,561 | 3% | | | | | | | | |
| 1990 | John Dingell | 88,962 | 67% | William Morse | 42,469 | 32% | Roger Pope | Libertarian | 2,019 | 2% | | | | | | | | |
| 1992 | John Dingell | 156,964 | 65% | Frank Beaumont | 75,694 | 31% | Max Siegle | Tisch Independent Citizens | 4,048 | 2% | Jeff Hampton | Libertarian | 1,842 | 1% | Martin McLaughlin | Workers League | 1,842 | 1% |
| 1994 | John Dingell | 105,846 | 59% | Ken Larkin | 71,159 | 40% | Noha Hamze | Natural Law | 1,968 | 1% | | | | | | | | |
| 1996 | John Dingell | 136,854 | 62% | James Desana | 78,723 | 36% | Bruce Cain | Libertarian | 3,155 | 1% | Noha Hamze | Natural Law | 1,018 | 0% | David Sole | Workers World | 842 | 0% |
| 1998 | John Dingell | 116,145 | 67% | William Morse | 54,121 | 31% | Edward Hlavac | Libertarian | 3,064 | 2% | Noha Hamze | Natural Law | 1,027 | 1% | | | | |
| 2000 | John Dingell | 167,142 | 71% | William Morse | 62,469 | 27% | Edward Hlavac | Libertarian | 2,814 | 1% | Ken Larkin | U.S. Taxpayers | 2,154 | 1% | Noha Hamze | Natural Law | 938 | 0% |

Michigan's 15th congressional district: Results 2002–2010
| Year | Democrat | Votes | % | Republican | Votes | % | Third Party | Party | Votes | % | Third Party | Party | Votes | % | Third Party | Party | Votes | % |
|---|---|---|---|---|---|---|---|---|---|---|---|---|---|---|---|---|---|---|
| 2002 | John Dingell | 136,518 | 72% | Martin Kaltenbach | 48,626 | 26% | Gregory Stempfle | Libertarian | 3,919 | 2% | | | | | | | | |
| 2004 | John Dingell | 218,409 | 71% | Dawn Reamer | 81,828 | 27% | Gregory Stempfle | Libertarian | 3,400 | 1% | Mike Eller | U.S. Taxpayers | 2,508 | 1% | Jerome White | NPA | 1,818 | 1% |
| 2006 | John Dingell | 181,946 | 88% | No candidate | | | Aimee Smith | Green | 9,447 | 5% | Gregory Stempfle | Libertarian | 8,410 | 4% | Robert Czak | U.S. Taxpayers | 7,064 | 3% |
| 2008 | John Dingell | 231,784 | 71% | John Lynch | 81,802 | 25% | Aimee Smith | Green | 7,082 | 2% | Gregory Stempfle | Libertarian | 4,002 | 1% | James Wagner | U.S. Taxpayers | 3,157 | 1% |
| 2010 | John Dingell | 116,293 | 57% | Rob Steele | 71,108 | 40% | Aimee Smith | Green | 2,686 | 1% | Kerry Morgan | Libertarian | 1,969 | 1% | Matthew Furman | U.S. Taxpayers | 1,821 | 1% |

Michigan's 12th congressional district: 2012 Results
| Year | Democrat | Votes | % | Republican | Votes | % | Third Party | Party | Votes | % |
|---|---|---|---|---|---|---|---|---|---|---|
| 2012 | John Dingell | 216,884 | 68% | Cynthia Kallgren | 92,472 | 29% | Richard Secula | Libertarian | 9,867 | 3% |

== Personal life ==
Dingell was Catholic. He had four children from his first marriage to Helen Henebry, a flight attendant. They married in 1952 and divorced in 1972. Dingell's son, Christopher D. Dingell, served in the Michigan State Senate and has served as a judge on the Michigan Third Circuit Court.

In 1981, Dingell married Deborah "Debbie" Insley, who was 27 years his junior. In November 2014, Debbie Dingell won the election to succeed her husband as U.S. Representative for Michigan's 12th congressional district. She took office in January 2015. She is the first non-widowed woman to immediately succeed her husband in Congress.

Dingell had surgery in 2014 to correct an abnormal heart rhythm, and the next year had surgery to install a pacemaker. He was hospitalized after a fall in 2017. On September 17, 2018, Dingell suffered an apparent heart attack and was hospitalized at Henry Ford Hospital in Detroit.

In his later years, Dingell became an active Twitter user, and earned over 250,000 followers for his witty and sarcastic posts attacking Republicans, particularly Donald Trump. He earned the nickname "the Dean of Twitter".

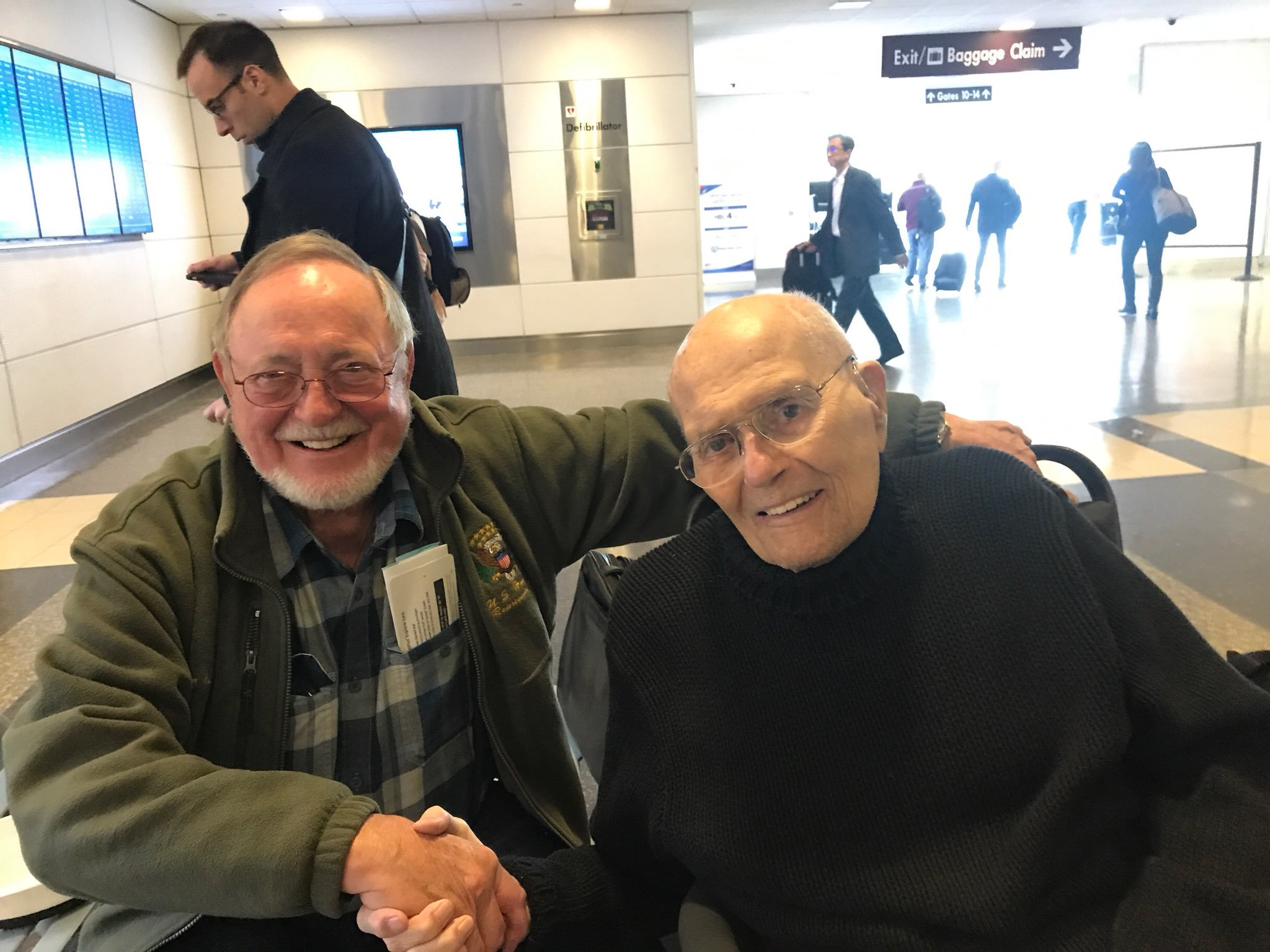
John Dingell with fellow Dean of the House Don Young in 2018.

In 2018, Dingell was diagnosed with prostate cancer, which had metastasized. He chose to forgo treatment, and entered hospice care. Dingell died on February 7, 2019, at his home in Dearborn, Michigan. On the day of his death, Dingell authored a column discussing his "last words" for the country; the column was published in The Washington Post.

== Legacy ==
Dingell received the Walter P. Reuther Humanitarian Award from Wayne State University in 2006.

President Barack Obama awarded Dingell the Presidential Medal of Freedom in 2014.

The John D. Dingell Jr. Conservation, Management, and Recreation Act, named in his honor and signed into law on March 12, 2019, permanently reauthorized the Land and Water Conservation Fund and established multiple areas of land protection.

On December 18, 2019, a day after Dingell's wife Rep. Debbie Dingell, who succeeded her husband as the member of the House of Representatives for Michigan's 12th district, voted yes to both articles of Donald Trump's first impeachment, Trump attacked John Dingell at a rally. Recounting a phone call with Dingell's widow in which she thanked the President for his support for a military flyover of her husband's funeral, Trump claimed Rep. Debbie Dingell told him, "'John would be so thrilled. He's looking down. He would be so thrilled. Thank you so much sir'". Trump continued to the rally attendees, "I said that's okay, don't worry about it. Maybe he's looking up, I don't know. I don't know, maybe. Maybe. But let's assume he's looking down", the implication being that the president suspected John Dingell was in Hell. This drew a strong criticism from several Democratic and some Republican politicians, several of whom offered praise for John Dingell's legacy. Politicians from both sides offered support to his widow and some Republican lawmakers apologized for the president's comments.

== See also ==
- List of members of the United States Congress by longevity of service

U.S. House of Representatives
| Preceded by John Dingell Sr. | Member of the U.S. House of Representatives from Michigan's 15th congressional district 1955–1965 | Succeeded by William Ford |
| Preceded by John Lesinski Jr. | Member of the U.S. House of Representatives from Michigan's 16th congressional district 1965–2003 | Constituency abolished |
| Preceded by Carolyn Cheeks Kilpatrick | Member of the U.S. House of Representatives from Michigan's 15th congressional district 2003–2013 | Constituency abolished |
| Preceded by Sander Levin | Member of the U.S. House of Representatives from Michigan's 12th congressional district 2013–2015 | Succeeded by Debbie Dingell |
| Preceded by Harley Orrin Staggers | Chair of the House Energy and Commerce Committee; 1981–1995 | Succeeded by Thomas J. Bliley Jr. |
| Preceded by Carlos Moorhead | Ranking Member of the House Energy and Commerce Committee; 1995–2007 | Succeeded by Joe Barton |
| Preceded by Joe Barton | Chair of the House Energy and Commerce Committee; 2007–2009 | Succeeded by Henry Waxman |
Honorary titles
| Preceded by Kenneth Gray | Baby of the House; 1955–1959 | Succeeded by Dan Rostenkowski |
| Preceded by Jamie Whitten | Dean of the United States House of Representatives; 1995–2015 | Succeeded by John Conyers |
| Preceded by Jamie Whitten | Most senior Democrat in the U.S. House of Representatives; 1995–2015 | Succeeded by John Conyers |
| Preceded by Melvin Laird | Most Senior Living U.S. Representative; Sitting or Former; 2016–2019 | Succeeded by William Broomfield; Merwin Coad; Hal Haskell |
