= 2010 United States House of Representatives elections in Michigan =

- November 2, 2010

All 15 Michigan seats to the United States House of Representatives
	Majority party	Minority party
Party	Republican	Democratic
Last election	7	8
Seats won	9	6
Seat change	▲2	▼2
Popular vote	1,671,707	1,415,212
Percentage	52.32%	44.30%
Swing	▲8.37%	▼8.01%

Republican
40–50%
50–60%
60–70%
70–80%
Democratic
40–50%
50–60%
60–70%
70–80%

Elections were held on November 2, 2010, to determine Michigan's 15 members of the United States House of Representatives. Representatives were elected for two-year terms to serve in the 112th United States Congress from January 3, 2011, until January 3, 2013. Primary elections were held on August 3, 2010.

Of the 15 elections, the 1st, 7th and 9th districts were rated as competitive by Sabato's Crystal Ball, CQ Politics and The Rothenberg Political Report, while The Cook Political Report rated the 1st, 3rd, 7th and 9th districts as competitive.

Three of Michigan's fifteen incumbents (Bart Stupak of the 1st district, Pete Hoekstra of the 2nd district and Vern Ehlers of the 3rd district) did not seek re-election. Of the twelve who did, one (Carolyn Cheeks Kilpatrick of the 13th district) was not renominated by her party, and one (Mark Schauer of the 7th district) was unsuccessful in the general election.

In total, nine Republicans and six Democrats were elected. A total of 3,194,901 votes were cast, of which 1,671,707 (52 percent) were for Republicans, 1,415,212 (44 percent) were for Democrats, 43,279 (1 percent) were for Libertarian Party candidates, 27,273 (1 percent) were for U.S. Taxpayers Party candidates, 25,739 (1 percent) were for Green Party candidates, 11,238 (0.4 percent) were for independent candidates, 409 (0.01 percent) were for a Natural Law Party candidate and 44 (0.001 percent) were for write-in candidates.

== Overview ==
Results of the 2010 United States House of Representatives elections in Michigan by district:

District	Republican		Democratic		Others		Total		Result
District	Votes	%	Votes	%	Votes	%	Votes	%	Result
District 1	120,523	51.94%	94,824	40.86%	16,690	7.19%	232,037	100.00%	Republican gain
District 2	148,864	65.27%	72,118	31.62%	7,096	3.11%	228,078	100.00%	Republican hold
District 3	133,714	59.68%	83,953	37.47%	6,396	2.85%	224,063	100.00%	Republican hold
District 4	148,531	66.21%	68,458	30.51%	7,365	3.28%	224,354	100.00%	Republican hold
District 5	89,680	44.34%	107,286	53.04%	5,297	2.62%	202,263	100.00%	Democratic hold
District 6	123,142	61.98%	66,729	33.58%	8,825	4.44%	198,696	100.00%	Republican hold
District 7	113,185	50.16%	102,402	45.38%	10,082	4.47%	225,669	100.00%	Republican gain
District 8	156,931	64.08%	84,069	34.33%	3,894	1.59%	244,894	100.00%	Republican hold
District 9	119,325	47.23%	125,730	49.76%	7,595	3.01%	252,650	100.00%	Democratic hold
District 10	168,364	71.97%	58,530	25.02%	7,036	3.01%	233,930	100.00%	Republican hold
District 11	141,224	59.27%	91,710	38.49%	5,353	2.25%	238,287	100.00%	Republican hold
District 12	71,372	34.97%	124,671	61.08%	8,074	3.95%	204,117	100.00%	Democratic hold
District 13	23,462	18.46%	100,885	79.39%	2,729	2.15%	127,076	100.00%	Democratic hold
District 14	29,902	19.87%	115,511	76.76%	5,065	3.37%	150,478	100.00%	Democratic hold
District 15	83,488	40.08%	118,336	56.81%	6,485	3.11%	208,309	100.00%	Democratic hold
Total	1,671,707	52.32%	1,415,212	44.30%	107,982	3.38%	3,194,901	100.00%	

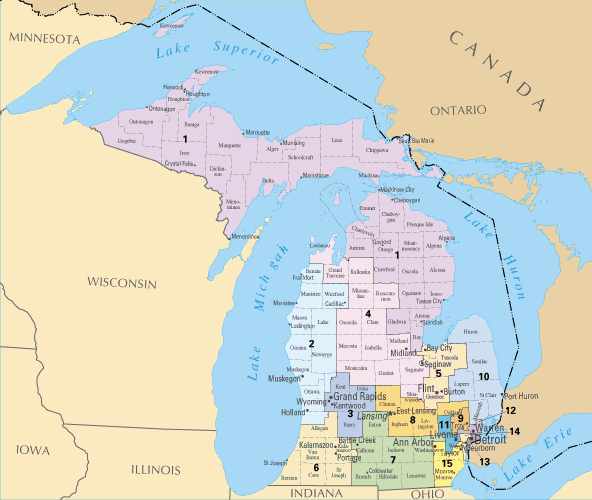
Michigan's congressional districts in 2010

== District 1 ==
2010 Michigan's 1st congressional district election
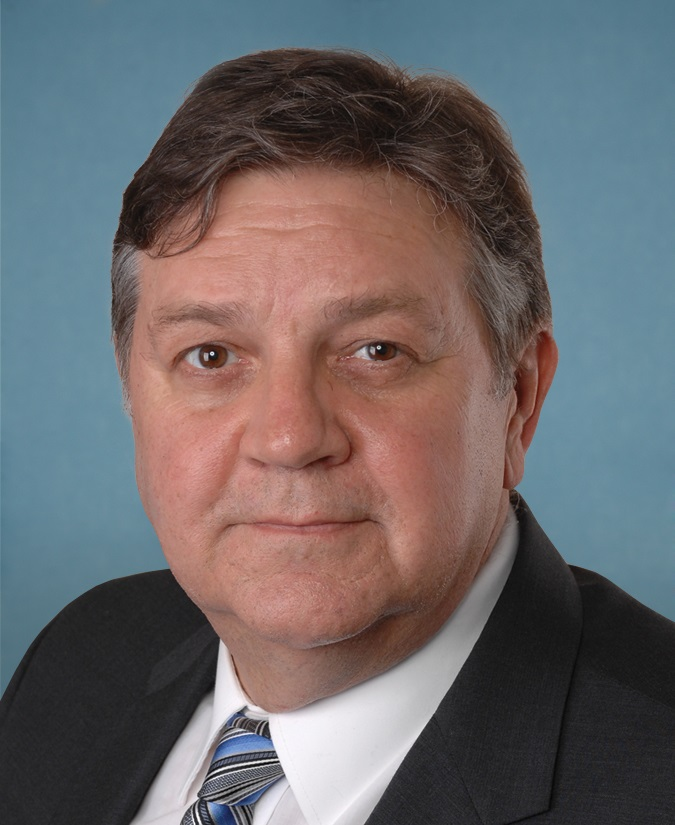

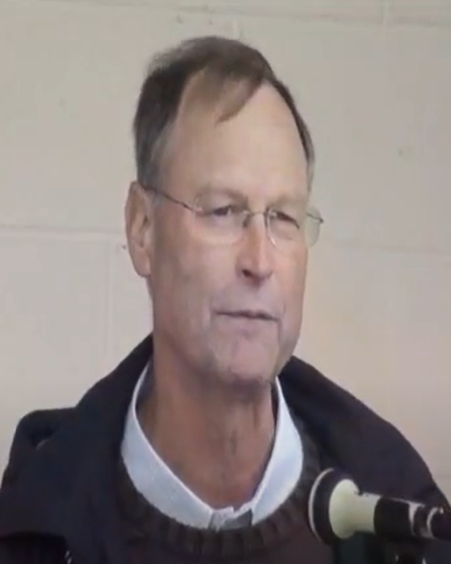
Nominee	Dan Benishek	Gary McDowell
Party	Republican	Democratic
Popular vote	120,523	94,824
Percentage	51.9%	40.9%
- County results Benishek: 40–50% 50–60% Mcdowell: 40–50% 50–60%
U.S. Representative before election
Bart Stupak
Democratic
Elected U.S. Representative
Dan Benishek
Republican

Michigan's 1st congressional district in 2010

In 2010, the 1st district included Marquette and Sault Ste. Marie. The district's population was 93 percent white (see Race and ethnicity in the United States census); 88 percent were high school graduates and 18 percent had received a bachelor's degree or higher. Its median income was $40,243. In the 2008 presidential election the district gave 50 percent of its vote to Democratic nominee Barack Obama and 48 percent to Republican nominee John McCain.

Democrat Bart Stupak, who took office in 1993, was the incumbent. Stupak was re-elected in 2008 with 65 percent of the vote. In 2010 Stupak retired rather than seeking re-election. The candidates in the general election were Democratic nominee Gary McDowell, a member of the Michigan House of Representatives; Republican nominee Dan Benishek, a physician; Green Party nominee Ellis Boal, a former Charlevoix County commissioner and prosecutor; U.S. Taxpayers Party nominee Patrick Lambert, a shift supervisor at Kalitta Air; Libertarian Party nominee Keith Shelton, a sports reporter; and independent candidate Glenn Wilson, the owner of an Internet service provider. Lonnie Lee Snyder had intended to run as a Tea Party candidate, but was found ineligible to do so in August 2010.

McDowell ran unopposed in the Democratic primary, as Mike Prusi, a member of the Michigan Senate, announced in April 2010 that he would not run; and Matt Gillard, a former member of the state House of Representatives; Connie Saltonstall, a former county official; and Joel Sheltrown, a member of the state House of Representatives, ended their campaigns in May 2010. Jason Allen, a member of the state Senate; Patrick Donlon, a businessman; Don Hooper, the owner of a trucking business; and Tom Stillings, a steel industry sales representative, also sought the Republican nomination. Linda Goldthorpe, a lawyer, suspended her campaign in July 2010; however her name remained on the Republican primary ballot. Dennis Lennox, the Cheboygan County drain commissioner, ended his campaign for the Republican nomination in March 2010. Jim Barcia, a former U.S. Representative; and Kevin Elsenheimer, the leader of the Republican Party in the state House of Representatives, both said in April 2010 they would not run. A poll conducted by Practical Political Consulting and released in July 2010, with a sample size of 140, found Benishek leading with 21 percent followed by Allen with 19 percent; Donlon, Goldthorpe, Hooper and Stillings each had the support of less than 2 percent of respondents, while around 55 percent were undecided.

McDowell raised $838,208 and spent $838,160. Benishek raised $1,379,311 and spent $1,343,624. Wilson raised $127,237 and spent $118,276. Allen raised $379,899 and spent $379,979. Goldthorpe raised $9,244 and spent $5,410.

A poll of 1,016 registered voters, conducted in August 2010 by We Ask America, found Benishek leading with 45 percent to McDowell's 29 percent, while 27 percent chose "Other/Unsure". In a poll of 406 likely voters by TargetPoint Consulting, conducted for Benishek's campaign between August 31 and September 1, 2010, Benishek led McDowell by 39 percent to 25 percent when the names of Wilson and Snyder were also given, and by 54 percent to 31 percent when Benishek and McDowell were the only names offered. A poll of 400 likely voters conducted by Hill Research Associates for the National Republican Congressional Committee between September 19 and September 21, 2010, found Benishek leading with 40 percent to McDowell's 24 percent. In a poll by Greenberg Quinlan Rosner for McDowell's campaign, conducted on September 21 and 22, 2010, with a sample size of 505 likely voters, Benishek led with 41 percent while McDowell received 38 percent, Wilson received 12 percent and 9 percent were undecided. A poll of 401 likely voters published by The Hill, conducted between October 2 and 7, 2010, 42 percent of respondents supported Benishek while 39 percent favored McDowell and 18 percent were undecided. In a poll of 400 likely voters by EPIC/MRA, conducted on October 17 and 18, 2010, Benishek led with 42 percent to McDowell's 40 percent. Though Benishek won the Republican primary by a margin of only 15 votes, Allen, who placed second, chose not to seek a recount.

Prior to the election FiveThirtyEight's forecast gave Benishek an 88 percent chance of winning, and projected that he would receive 52 percent of the vote to McDowell's 45 percent. On election day Benishek was elected with 52 percent of the vote to McDowell's 41 percent. Benishek was re-elected in 2012, again against McDowell, and in 2014.

=== Republican primary results ===
Michigan's 1st congressional district Republican primary, August 3, 2010
Party	Candidate	Votes	%
Republican	Dan Benishek	27,077	38.14
Republican	Jason Allen	27,062	38.12
Republican	Tom Stillings	5,418	7.63
Republican	Linda Goldthorpe	4,980	7.01
Republican	Don Hooper	3,969	5.59
Republican	Patrick Donlon	2,490	3.51
Total votes		70,996	100.00

==== Predictions ====
Source	Ranking	As of
The Cook Political Report	Lean R (flip)	November 1, 2010
Rothenberg	Tilt R (flip)	November 1, 2010
Sabato's Crystal Ball	Lean R (flip)	November 1, 2010
RCP	Lean R (flip)	November 1, 2010
CQ Politics	Lean R (flip)	October 28, 2010
New York Times	Lean R (flip)	November 1, 2010
FiveThirtyEight	Likely R (flip)	November 1, 2010

=== General election results ===
Michigan's 1st congressional district general election, November 2, 2010
Party	Candidate	Votes	%
Republican	Dan Benishek	120,523	51.94
Democratic	Gary McDowell	94,824	40.87
Independent	Glenn Wilson	7,847	3.38
U.S. Taxpayers'	Patrick Lambert	4,200	1.81
Libertarian	Keith Shelton	2,571	1.11
Green	Ellis Boal	2,072	0.89
Total votes		232,037	100.00

=== External links ===
- "Jason Allen campaign website". Archived from the original on August 6, 2010.
- "Dan Benishek campaign website". Archived from the original on October 28, 2010.
- "Ellis Boal campaign website". Archived from the original on October 28, 2010.
- "Patrick Donlon campaign website". Archived from the original on October 28, 2010.
- "Matt Gillard campaign website". Archived from the original on July 13, 2010.
- "Linda Goldthorpe campaign website". Archived from the original on September 10, 2010.
- "Don Hooper campaign website". Archived from the original on July 22, 2010.
- "Patrick Lambert campaign website". Archived from the original on October 28, 2010.
- "Gary McDowell campaign website". Archived from the original on October 29, 2010.
- "Keith Shelton campaign website". Archived from the original on October 28, 2010.
- "Tom Stillings campaign website". Archived from the original on March 28, 2010.
- "Glenn Wilson campaign website". Archived from the original on November 4, 2010.

== District 2 ==
2010 Michigan's 2nd congressional district election

Nominee	Bill Huizenga	Fred Johnson
Party	Republican	Democratic
Popular vote	148,864	72,118
Percentage	65.3%	31.6%
- County results Huizenga: 40–50% 50–60% 60–70% 70–80%
U.S. Representative before election
Pete Hoekstra
Republican
Elected U.S. Representative
Bill Huizenga
Republican

Michigan's 2nd congressional district in 2010

The 2nd district included Holland, Muskegon and Norton Shores. The district's population was 86 percent white and 6 percent Hispanic (see Race and ethnicity in the United States census); 88 percent were high school graduates and 21 percent had received a bachelor's degree or higher. Its median income was $47,736. In the 2008 presidential election, the district gave 51 percent of its vote to Republican nominee John McCain and 47 percent to Democratic nominee Barack Obama.

Republican Pete Hoekstra, who took office in 1993, was the incumbent. Hoekstra was re-elected in 2008 with 62 percent of the vote. In 2010, Hoekstra ran for Governor of Michigan rather than seeking re-election. The candidates in the general election were Republican nominee Bill Huizenga, a member of the Michigan House of Representatives; Democratic nominee Fred Johnson, an associate professor of history at Hope College; Green Party nominee Lloyd Clarke, a former United Auto Workers representative; Libertarian Party nominee Joseph Gillotte, the founder and owner of Presort Services Inc.; and U.S. Taxpayers Party nominee Ronald Graeser, a Doctor of Osteopathic Medicine.

Bill Cooper, a small business owner; Wayne Kuipers, a member of the Michigan Senate; Chris Larson, a member of the Ferrysburg city council; Field Reichardt, the president of the Organic Olive Oil Co., Jay Riemersma, a former American football player; and Ted Schendel, a retired police officer, also sought the Republican nomination. Jeff Wincel, the owner of a consulting firm, sought the Republican nomination but ended his campaign in April 2010. In a poll of 335 likely Republican voters, conducted between July 26 and 28, 2010, by The Grand Rapids Press, 25 percent of respondents favored Riemersma, while 15 percent favored Cooper, the same percentage favored Huizenga, 13 percent favored Kuipers, and 30 percent were undecided. After the primary Huizenga led Riemersma by less than 700 votes; however Riemersma released a statement saying he would not seek a recount. Nicolette McClure, a Lake County commissioner, also sought the Democratic nomination.

Huizenga raised $684,347 and spent $634,952. Johnson raised $125,474 and spent $119,305. Cooper raised $310,497 and spent the same amount. Kuipers raised $232,223 and spent the same amount. Reichardt raised $151,160 and spent $151,064. Riemersma raised $917,362 and spent $915,037. Schendel raised $6,451 and spent $6,651. Wincel raised $14,185 and spent $14,044. McClure raised $20,856 and spent $19,429.

Prior to the election, FiveThirtyEight's forecast gave Huizenga a 100 percent chance of winning, and projected that he would receive 63 percent of the vote to Johnson's 34 percent. On election day Huizenga was elected with 65 percent of the vote to Johnson's 32 percent. Huizenga was re-elected in 2012 and 2014.

=== Republican primary results ===
Michigan's 2nd district Republican primary, August 3, 2010
Party	Candidate	Votes	%
Republican	Bill Huizenga	27,041	25.40
Republican	Jay Riemersma	26,378	24.77
Republican	Wayne Kuipers	23,226	21.81
Republican	Bill Cooper	20,584	19.33
Republican	Field Reichardt	4,517	4.24
Republican	Ted Schendel	2,401	2.25
Republican	Chris Larson	2,332	2.19
Total votes		106,479	100.00

=== Democratic primary results ===
Michigan's 2nd district Democratic primary, August 3, 2010
Party	Candidate	Votes	%
Democratic	Fred Johnson	12,375	59.94
Democratic	Nicolette McClure	8,272	40.06
Total votes		20,647	100.00

==== Predictions ====
Source	Ranking	As of
The Cook Political Report	Safe R	November 1, 2010
Rothenberg	Safe R	November 1, 2010
Sabato's Crystal Ball	Safe R	November 1, 2010
RCP	Safe R	November 1, 2010
CQ Politics	Safe R	October 28, 2010
New York Times	Safe R	November 1, 2010
FiveThirtyEight	Safe R	November 1, 2010

=== General election results ===
Michigan's 2nd congressional district general election, November 2, 2010
Party	Candidate	Votes	%
Republican	Bill Huizenga	148,864	65.27
Democratic	Fred Johnson	72,118	31.62
Libertarian	Joseph Gillotte	2,701	1.18
U.S. Taxpayers'	Ronald Graeser	2,379	1.04
Green	Lloyd Clarke	2,016	0.88
Total votes		228,078	100.00

=== External links ===
- "Lloyd Clarke campaign website". Archived from the original on October 28, 2010.
- "Bill Cooper campaign website". Archived from the original on September 1, 2010.
- "Joseph Gillotte campaign website". Archived from the original on June 8, 2011.
- "Bill Huizenga campaign website". Archived from the original on November 4, 2010.
- "Fred Johnson campaign website". Archived from the original on October 29, 2010.
- "Wayne Kuipers campaign website". Archived from the original on August 6, 2010.
- "Chris Larson campaign website". Archived from the original on August 9, 2010.
- "Nicolette McClure campaign website". Archived from the original on August 5, 2010.
- "Jay Riemersma campaign website". Archived from the original on October 22, 2010.
- "Ted Schendel campaign website". Archived from the original on July 31, 2010.

== District 3 ==
2010 Michigan's 3rd congressional district election
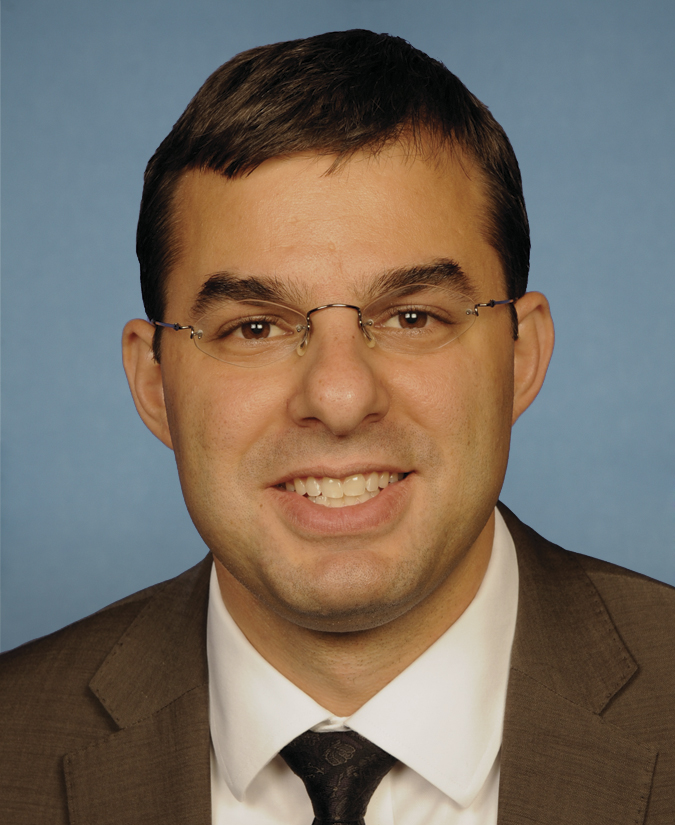

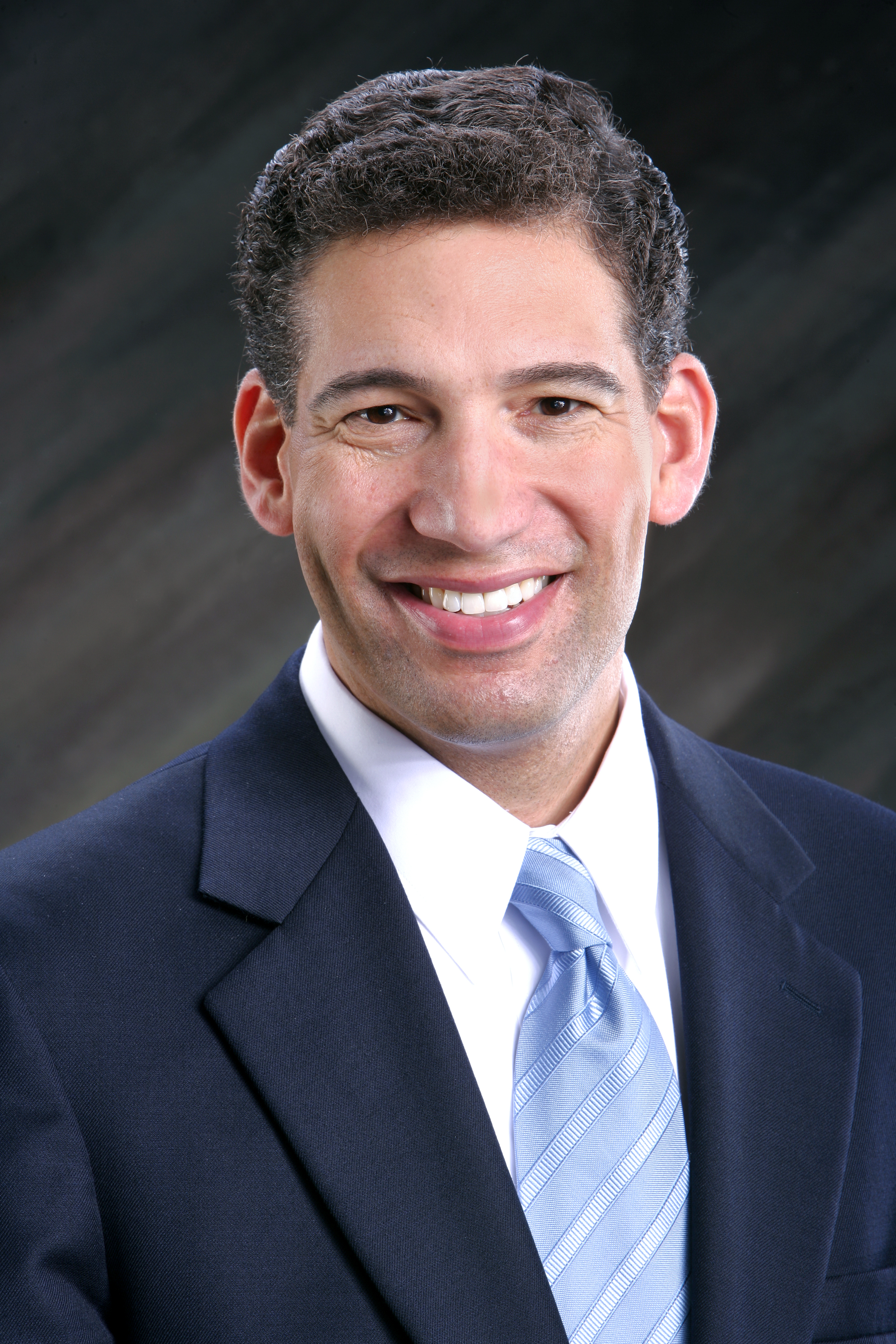
Nominee	Justin Amash	Patrick Miles Jr.
Party	Republican	Democratic
Popular vote	133,714	83,953
Percentage	59.7%	37.5%
- County results Amash: 50–60% 60–70%
U.S. Representative before election
Vern Ehlers
Republican
Elected U.S. Representative
Justin Amash
Republican

Michigan's 3rd district

The 3rd district included Grand Rapids and Wyoming. The district's population was 80 percent white, 8 percent Hispanic and 8 percent black (see Race and ethnicity in the United States census); 88 percent were high school graduates and 28 percent had received a bachelor's degree or higher. Its median income was $51,386. In the 2008 presidential election, Republican nominee John McCain and Democratic nominee Barack Obama each received 49 percent of the vote in the district.

Republican Vern Ehlers, who took office in 1993, was the incumbent. Ehlers was re-elected in 2008 with 61 percent of the vote. In 2010 Ehlers retired rather than seeking re-election. The candidates in the general election were Republican nominee Justin Amash, a member of the Michigan House of Representatives; Democratic nominee Patrick Miles Jr., a lawyer; U.S. Taxpayers Party nominee Ted Gerrard, an electrician; Libertarian Party nominee James Rogers, a technical consultant in the fields of renewable energy and HVAC; and Green Party nominee Charlie Shick, an employee in the field of warehouse inventory control.

Bill Hardiman, a member of the Michigan Senate; Steve Heacock, a former Kent County commissioner; Louise "Ellie" Johnson, an attorney; and Bob Overbeek, a United States Air Force veteran, also sought the Republican nomination. Terri Lynn Land, the Secretary of State of Michigan; and Dick Posthumus, a former Lieutenant Governor of Michigan; both said in February 2010 that they would not seek the Republican nomination. In a poll of 485 likely voters, conducted by The Grand Rapids Press between July 26 and 30, 2010, 28 percent of respondents favored Amash, while 23 percent supported Hardiman, 17 percent backed Heacock, and 26 percent were undecided. Paul Mayhue, a former Kent County commissioner, also sought the Democratic nomination.

Amash raised $1,103,513 and spent $1,093,007. Miles raised $990,599 and spent $988,091. Gerrard raised $1,405 and spent $2,082. Rogers raised $7,920 and spent $8,611. Hardiman raised $209,236 and spent $202,459. Heacock raised $393,212 and spent the same amount. Overbeek raised $9,213 and spent $6,789. Mayhue raised $11,636 and spent $9,773.

In a poll of 1,006 registered voters, conducted by We Ask America in August 2010, 51 percent of respondents supported Amash while 30 percent favored Miles and 19 percent chose "Other/Unsure". A poll of 400 likely voters, conducted by EPIC/MRA between October 16 and 19, 2010, found Amash leading with 46 percent to Miles's 37 percent, while 8 percent supported other candidates and 9 percent were undecided. A poll of 400 likely voters, conducted by Public Opinion Strategies on October 19 and 20, 2010, found Amash leading with 49 percent to Miles's 30 percent.

Prior to the election FiveThirtyEight's forecast gave Amash a 99 percent chance of winning, and projected that he would receive 59 percent of the vote to Miles's 38 percent. On election day Amash was elected with 60 percent of the vote to Miles's 37 percent. In July 2012 Miles was confirmed as the United States Attorney for the Western District of Michigan. Amash was re-elected in November of that year and in 2014.

=== Republican primary results ===
Michigan's 3rd district Republican primary, August 3, 2010
Party	Candidate	Votes	%
Republican	Justin Amash	38,569	40.35
Republican	Steve Heacock	25,157	26.32
Republican	Bill Hardiman	22,715	23.76
Republican	Bob Overbeek	5,133	5.37
Republican	Louise Johnson	4,020	4.21
Total votes		95,594	100.00

=== Democratic primary results ===
Michigan's 3rd district Democratic primary, August 3, 2010
Party	Candidate	Votes	%
Democratic	Patrick Miles Jr.	14,114	68.53
Democratic	Paul Mayhue	6,480	31.47
Total votes		20,594	100.00

==== Predictions ====
Source	Ranking	As of
The Cook Political Report	Safe R	November 1, 2010
Rothenberg	Safe R	November 1, 2010
Sabato's Crystal Ball	Safe R	November 1, 2010
RCP	Safe R	November 1, 2010
CQ Politics	Safe R	October 28, 2010
New York Times	Safe R	November 1, 2010
FiveThirtyEight	Safe R	November 1, 2010

=== General election results ===
Michigan's 3rd congressional district general election, November 2, 2010
Party	Candidate	Votes	%
Republican	Justin Amash	133,714	59.68
Democratic	Patrick Miles Jr.	83,953	37.47
Libertarian	James Rogers	2,677	1.19
U.S. Taxpayers'	Ted Gerrard	2,144	0.96
Green	Charlie Shick	1,575	0.70
Total votes		224,063	100.00

=== External links ===
- "Justin Amash campaign website". Archived from the original on October 29, 2010.
- "Ted Gerrard campaign website". Archived from the original on October 28, 2010.
- "Bill Hardiman campaign website". Archived from the original on March 28, 2010.
- "Steve Heacock campaign website". Archived from the original on May 23, 2010.
- "Louise Johnson campaign website". Archived from the original on May 23, 2010.
- "Paul Mayhue campaign website". Archived from the original on August 30, 2010.
- "Patrick Miles Jr. campaign website". Archived from the original on October 29, 2010.
- "Bob Overbeek campaign website". Archived from the original on April 10, 2010.
- "James Rogers campaign website". Archived from the original on October 28, 2010.
- "Charlie Shick campaign website". Archived from the original on October 28, 2010.

== District 4 ==
2010 Michigan's 4th congressional district election
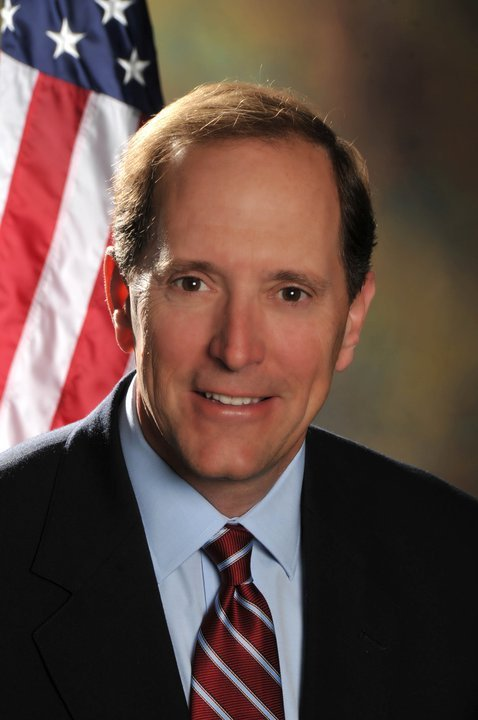

Nominee	Dave Camp	Jerry Campbell
Party	Republican	Democratic
Popular vote	148,531	68,458
Percentage	66.2%	30.5%
- County results Camp: 60–70% 70–80%
U.S. Representative before election
Dave Camp
Republican
Elected U.S. Representative
Dave Camp
Republican

Michigan's 4th congressional district in 2010

The 4th district included Mount Pleasant and part of Midland. The district's population was 91 percent white (see Race and ethnicity in the United States census); 88 percent were high school graduates and 21 percent had received a bachelor's degree or higher. Its median income was $43,605. In the 2008 presidential election the district gave 50 percent of its vote to Democratic nominee Barack Obama and 48 percent to Republican nominee John McCain.

Republican Dave Camp, who took office in 1991, was the incumbent. Camp was re-elected in 2008 with 62 percent of the vote. In 2010, Camp's opponent in the general election was Democratic nominee Jerry M. Campbell, a former supervisor of Richfield Township, Roscommon County. Libertarian Party nominee John Emerick and U.S. Taxpayers Party nominee Clint Foster, a home remodeling sales representative, also ran. Both Camp and Campbell were unopposed in their party primaries.

Camp raised $3,051,808 and spent $2,148,515. Campbell raised $15,881 and spent $15,880. Prior to the election FiveThirtyEight's forecast gave Camp a 100 percent chance of winning, and projected that he would receive 66 percent of the vote to Campbell's 31 percent. On election day Camp was re-elected with 66 percent of the vote to Campbell's 31 percent. Camp was again re-elected in 2012 and retired rather than seeking re-election in 2014. He was succeeded by Republican John Moolenaar.

=== Predictions ===
Source	Ranking	As of
The Cook Political Report	Safe R	November 1, 2010
Rothenberg	Safe R	November 1, 2010
Sabato's Crystal Ball	Safe R	November 1, 2010
RCP	Safe R	November 1, 2010
CQ Politics	Safe R	October 28, 2010
New York Times	Safe R	November 1, 2010
FiveThirtyEight	Safe R	November 1, 2010

=== General election results ===
Michigan's 4th district general election, November 2, 2010
Party	Candidate	Votes	%
Republican	Dave Camp (incumbent)	148,531	66.20
Democratic	Jerry Campbell	68,458	30.51
U.S. Taxpayers'	John Emerick	3,861	1.72
Libertarian	Clint Foster	3,504	1.56
Total votes		224,354	100.00

=== External links ===
- "Dave Camp campaign website". Archived from the original on November 1, 2010.
- "Jerry Campbell campaign website". Archived from the original on October 29, 2010.

== District 5 ==
2010 Michigan's 5th congressional district election
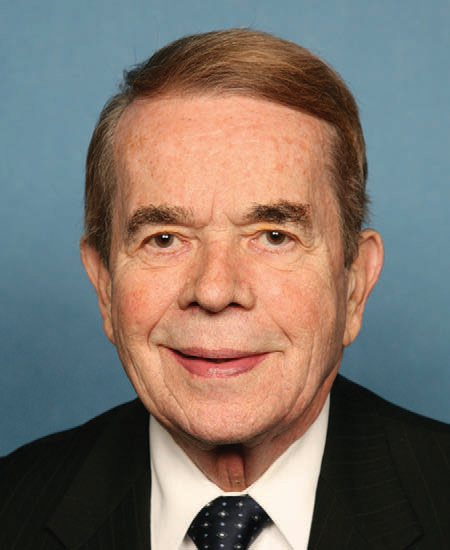

Nominee	Dale Kildee	John Kupiec
Party	Democratic	Republican
Popular vote	107,286	89,680
Percentage	53.0%	44.3%
- County results Kildee: 40–50% 50–60% 60–70% Kupiec: 60–70%
U.S. Representative before election
Dale Kildee
Democratic
Elected U.S. Representative
Dale Kildee
Democratic

Michigan's 5th district

The 5th district included Bay City, Burton, Flint and Saginaw. The district's population was 76 percent white and 18 percent black (see Race and ethnicity in the United States census); 87 percent were high school graduates and 18 percent had received a bachelor's degree or higher. Its median income was $42,578. In the 2008 presidential election the district gave 64 percent of its vote to Democratic nominee Barack Obama and 35 percent to Republican nominee John McCain.

Democrat Dale Kildee, who took office in 1977, was the incumbent. Kildee was re-elected with 70 percent of the vote in 2008. In 2010, Kildee's opponent in the general election was Republican nominee John Kupiec, a businessman. Green Party nominee J. Matthew de Heus, an instructor at Delta College, also ran. Libertarian Party nominee Michael J. Moon, a technician at XO Communications, withdrew from the race in October 2010. Rick Wilson, a former supervisor for General Motors, also sought the Republican nomination. Scott Withers, the owner of Withers Media and a former vice president of the Auction Network, also sought the Democratic nomination.

Kildee raised $622,561 and spent $1,207,958. Kupiec raised $356,589 and spent $356,390. Wilson raised $71,073 and spent $70,114. Withers raised $14,628 and spent $13,660.

Prior to the election FiveThirtyEight's forecast gave Kildee a 100 percent chance of winning, and projected that he would receive 63 percent of the vote to Kupiec's 34 percent. In October 2010 John Fund of The Wall Street Journal named the race as one of "five districts that could deliver upset victories", citing the possibility that Michigan's straight-ticket voting system would result in Rick Snyder's successful gubernatorial campaign affecting the results of congressional races. On election day Kildee was re-elected with 53 percent of the vote to Kupiec's 44 percent. Kildee retired rather than seeking re-election in 2012 and was succeeded by his nephew Dan Kildee.

=== Democratic primary results ===
Michigan's 5th district Democratic primary, August 3, 2010
Party	Candidate	Votes	%
Democratic	Dale Kildee (incumbent)	34,902	78.43
Democratic	Scott Withers	9,596	21.57
Total votes		44,498	100.00

=== Republican primary results ===
Michigan's 5th district Republican primary, August 3, 2010
Party	Candidate	Votes	%
Republican	John Kupiec	22,177	55.69
Republican	Rick Wilson	17,643	44.31
Total votes		39,820	100.00

==== Predictions ====
Source	Ranking	As of
The Cook Political Report	Safe D	November 1, 2010
Rothenberg	Safe D	November 1, 2010
Sabato's Crystal Ball	Safe D	November 1, 2010
RCP	Safe D	November 1, 2010
CQ Politics	Safe D	October 28, 2010
New York Times	Safe D	November 1, 2010
FiveThirtyEight	Safe D	November 1, 2010

=== General election results ===
Michigan's 5th district general election, November 2, 2010
Party	Candidate	Votes	%
Democratic	Dale Kildee (incumbent)	107,286	53.04
Republican	John Kupiec	89,680	44.34
Green	J. de Heus	2,649	1.31
Libertarian	Michael Moon	2,648	1.31
Total votes		202,263	100.00

=== External links ===
- "J. Matthew de Heus campaign website". Archived from the original on October 28, 2010.
- "Dale Kildee campaign website". Archived from the original on October 29, 2010.
- "John Kupiec campaign website". Archived from the original on October 29, 2010.
- "Rick Wilson campaign website". Archived from the original on August 3, 2010.

== District 6 ==
2010 Michigan's 6th congressional district election
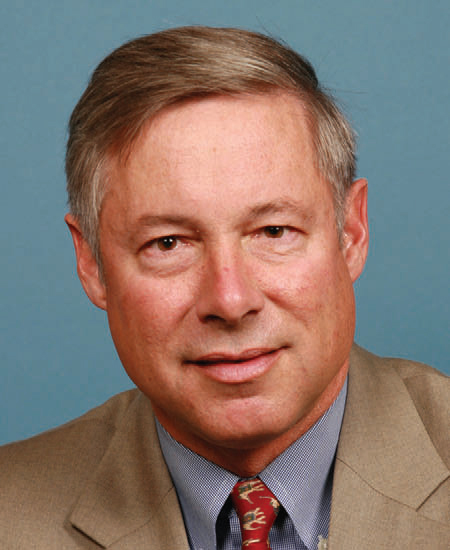

Nominee	Fred Upton	Don Cooney
Party	Republican	Democratic
Popular vote	123,142	66,729
Percentage	62.0%	33.6%
- County results Upton: 50–60% 60–70% 70–80%
U.S. Representative before election
Fred Upton
Republican
Elected U.S. Representative
Fred Upton
Republican

Michigan's 6th congressional district in 2010

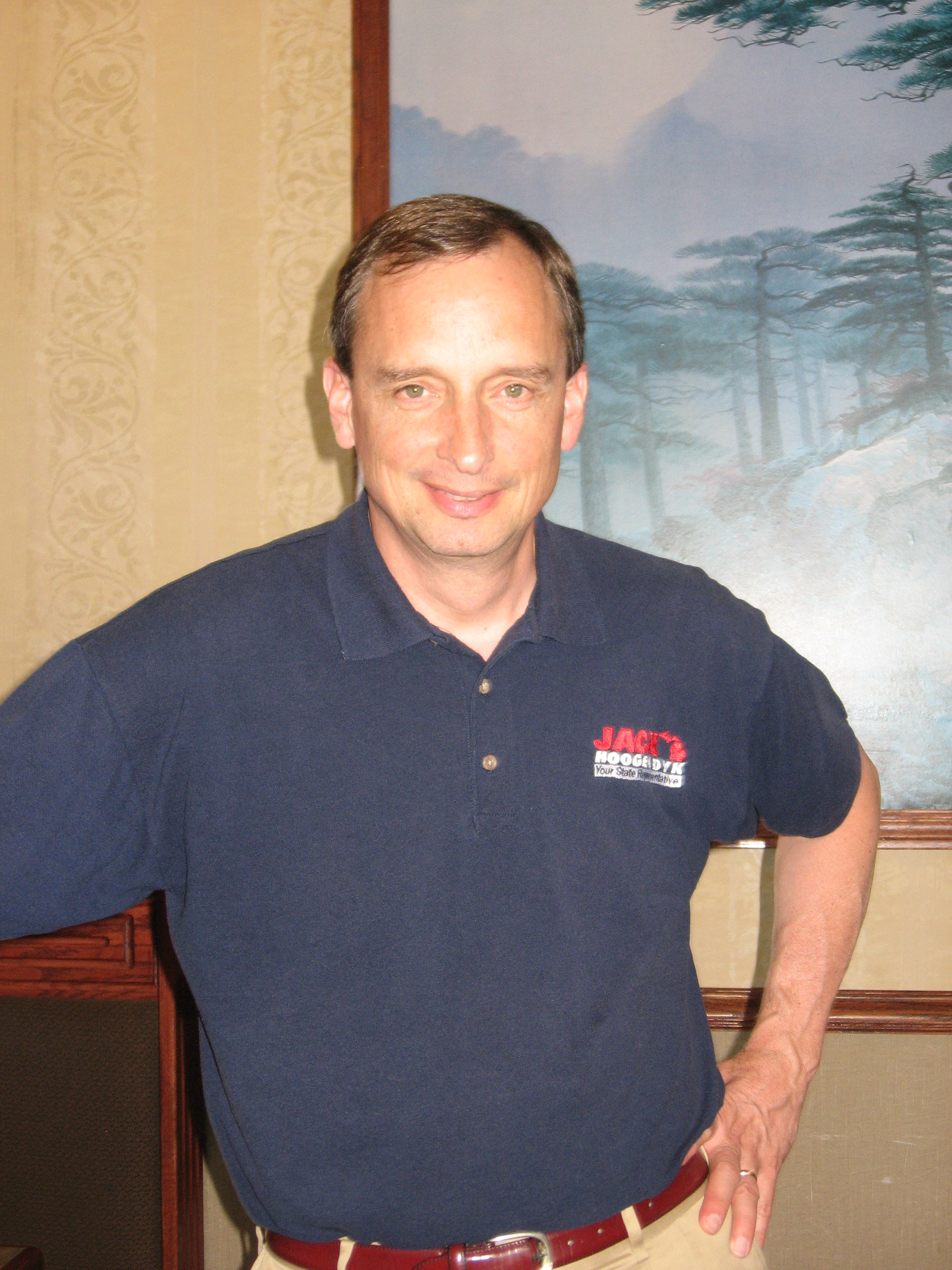
Jack Hoogendyk, who also ran in the Republican primary in the 6th district

The 6th district included Kalamazoo, Niles, Portage and Sturgis. The district's population was 83 percent white, 8 percent black and 5 percent Hispanic (see Race and ethnicity in the United States census); 88 percent were high school graduates and 24 percent had received a bachelor's degree or higher. Its median income was $45,661. In the 2008 presidential election the district gave 54 percent of its vote to Democratic nominee Barack Obama and 44 percent to Republican nominee John McCain.

Republican Fred Upton, who took office in 1987, was the incumbent. In 2008 Upton was re-elected with 59 percent of the vote. In 2010, Upton's opponent in the general election was Democratic nominee Don Cooney, a Kalamazoo city commissioner and professor of social work. Green Party nominee Pat Foster, an accountant; Libertarian Party nominee Fred Strand, a restaurant owner and retired airline pilot; and U.S. Taxpayers Party nominee Mel Valkner, a business owner and accountant, also ran. Jack Hoogendyk, a former member of the Michigan House of Representatives, also sought the Republican nomination. Cooney was unopposed in the Democratic primary.

Upton raised $2,014,321 and spent $2,083,790. Cooney raised $62,447 and spent $61,614. Hoogendyk raised $67,817 and spent $66,644.

Prior to the election FiveThirtyEight's forecast gave Upton a 100 percent chance of winning, and projected that he would receive 63 percent of the vote to Cooney's 34 percent. On election day Upton was re-elected with 62 percent of the vote to Cooney's 34 percent. Upton was again re-elected in 2012 and 2014, while in 2013 Cooney ran for re-election as city commissioner.

=== Republican primary results ===
Michigan's 6th district Republican primary, August 3, 2010
Party	Candidate	Votes	%
Republican	Fred Upton (incumbent)	42,182	57.12
Republican	Jack Hoogendyk	31,660	42.88
Total votes		73,842	100.00

==== Predictions ====
Source	Ranking	As of
The Cook Political Report	Safe R	November 1, 2010
Rothenberg	Safe R	November 1, 2010
Sabato's Crystal Ball	Safe R	November 1, 2010
RCP	Safe R	November 1, 2010
CQ Politics	Safe R	October 28, 2010
New York Times	Safe R	November 1, 2010
FiveThirtyEight	Safe R	November 1, 2010

=== General election results ===
Michigan's 6th district general election, November 6, 2010
Party	Candidate	Votes	%
Republican	Fred Upton (incumbent)	123,142	61.98
Democratic	Don Cooney	66,729	33.58
U.S. Taxpayers'	Melvin Valkner	3,672	1.85
Libertarian	Fred Strand	3,369	1.70
Green	Pat Foster	1,784	0.90
Total votes		198,696	100.00

=== External links ===
- "Don Cooney campaign website". Archived from the original on November 4, 2010.
- "Jack Hoogendyk campaign website". Archived from the original on September 24, 2010.
- "Fred Strand campaign website". Archived from the original on October 31, 2010.
- "Fred Upton campaign website". Archived from the original on January 2, 2014.
- "Melvin Valkner campaign website". Archived from the original on October 30, 2010.

== District 7 ==
2010 Michigan's 7th congressional district election
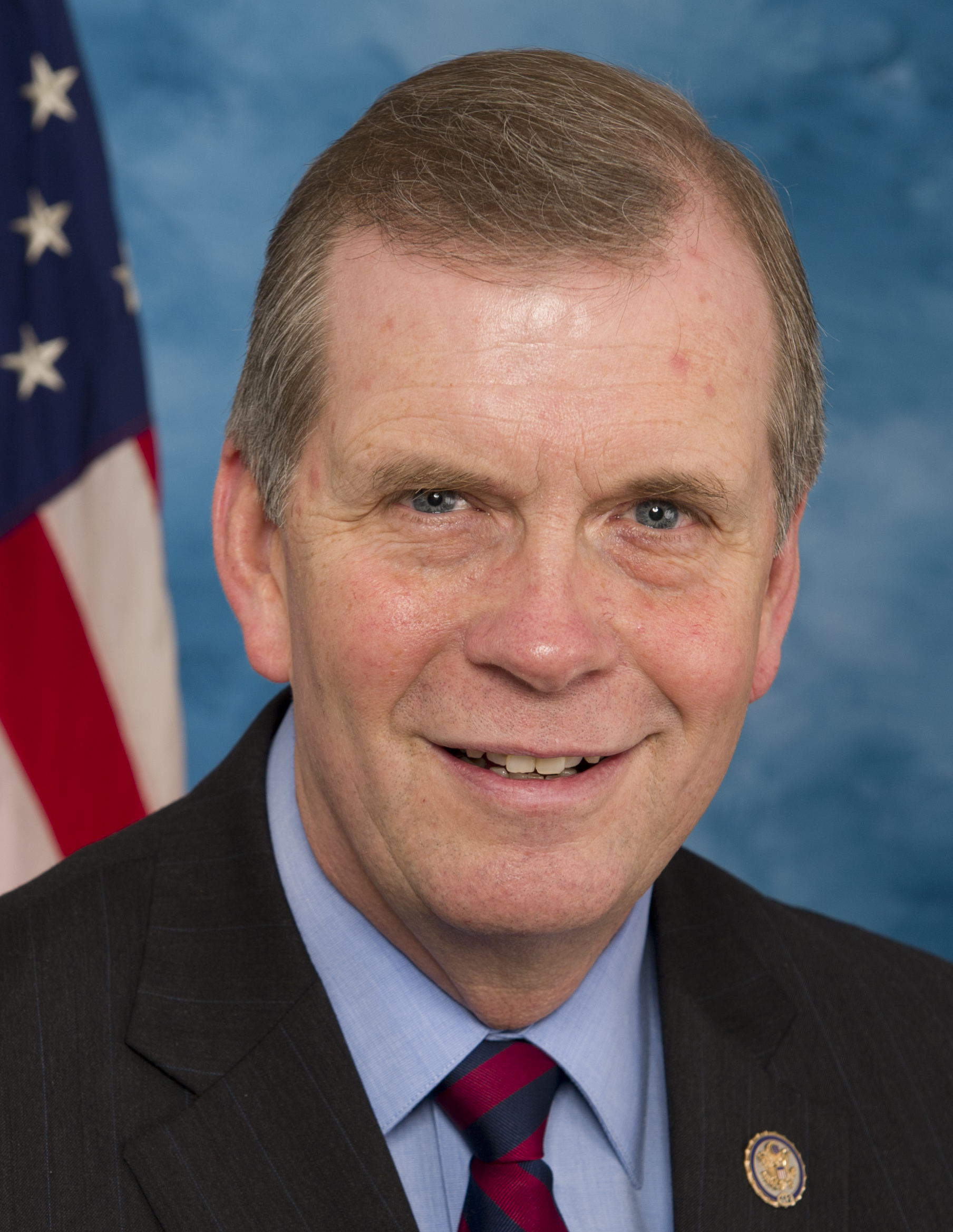

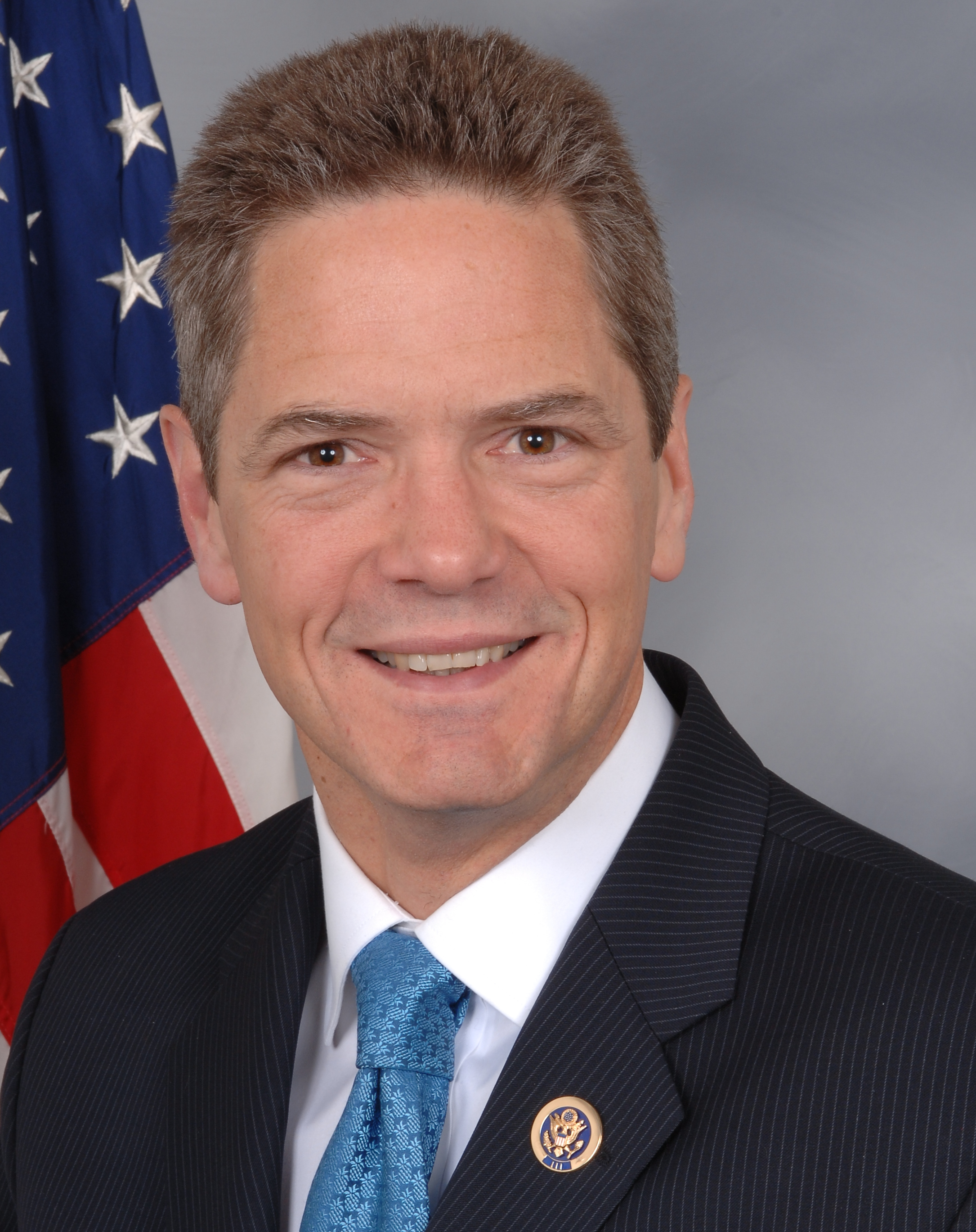
Nominee	Tim Walberg	Mark Schauer
Party	Republican	Democratic
Popular vote	113,185	102,402
Percentage	50.2%	45.4%
- County results Walberg: 40–50% 50–60% 60–70% Schauer: 40–50% 50–60%
U.S. Representative before election
Mark Schauer
Democratic
Elected U.S. Representative
Tim Walberg
Republican

Michigan's 7th congressional district in 2010

The 7th district included Battle Creek and Jackson. The district's population was 88 percent white and 6 percent black (see Race and ethnicity in the United States census); 89 percent were high school graduates and 22 percent had received a bachelor's degree or higher. Its median income was $50,824. In the 2008 presidential election the district gave 52 percent of its vote to Democratic nominee Barack Obama and 46 percent to Republican Party nominee John McCain.

Democrat Mark Schauer, who took office in 2009, was the incumbent. Schauer was elected in 2008 with 49 percent of the vote. In 2010, Schauer's opponent in the general election was Republican nominee Tim Walberg, a former U.S. Representative. U.S. Taxpayers Party nominee Scott Eugene Aughney, a sales and marketing agent in the food industry; write-in candidate Dan Davis; Libertarian Party nominee Greg Merle, an insurance salesman; and Green Party nominee Richard E. Wunsch, a taxi driver and bookstore owner, also ran. Davis, a former police officer, had intended to run as a Tea Party candidate in the general election but was removed from the ballot in August 2010.

Schauer ran unopposed in the Democratic primary. Marvin Carlson, a businessman; and Iraq War veteran Brian Rooney also sought the Republican nomination. Mike Stahly also briefly ran in the Republican primary, but ended his campaign due to fundraising difficulties. Former U.S. Representative Joe Schwarz, a Republican, said in April 2009 that he would not run again. In a poll of the Republican primary, released by Inside Michigan Politics in July 2010, 48 percent of respondents supported Walberg while 16 percent favored Rooney and 30 percent were undecided.

Schauer raised $3,255,382 and spent $3,261,651. Walberg raised $1,678,049 and spent $1,647,379. Aughney raised $723 and spent $715. Carlson raised $42,180 and spent $42,798. Rooney raised $777,205 and spent $767,104.

In a poll of 300 likely voters conducted by National Research Inc. for Walberg's campaign, the results of which were published in January 2010, 46 percent of respondents supported Walberg while 37 percent favored Schauer. Among the same sample Schauer led Rooney by 39 percent to 31 percent. A poll of 1,008 likely voters conducted by We Ask America on August 4, 2010, found Walberg leading with 45 percent to Schauer's 37 percent while 18 percent were undecided. In a poll of 400 likely voters, conducted by Republican pollster Whit Ayres between August 16 and 18, 2010, that informed respondents of Schauer's support for the Patient Protection and Affordable Care Act, Walberg led with 50 percent to Schauer's 40 percent. A poll by Rossman Group and Team TelCom, conducted on September 20, 2010, with a sample size of 300 likely voters, found Walberg leading with 42 percent to Schauer's 38 percent. An internal poll for Schauer's campaign by Myers Research & Strategic Services, published on September 23, 2010, found Schauer leading in a two-candidate race with 49 percent to Walberg's 45 percent, and in a multi-candidate race with 45 percent to Walberg's 43 percent while third-party candidates collectively received 5 percent. In a poll of 404 likely voters conducted between September 25 and 27, 2010, and published by The Hill Schauer and Walberg received the support of 41 percent of respondents each, while 13 percent remained undecided. In a poll of 500 likely voters, conducted by Myers Research & Strategic Services on October 3 and 4, 2010, Schauer led with 44 percent to Walberg's 40 percent, while 7 percent supported third-party candidates. An EPIC/MRA poll of 400 people, conducted on October 16 and 17, found Schauer leading with 45 percent to Walberg's 39 percent. In a poll conducted for 6 News with a margin of error of plus or minus 5 percent, the results of which were published on October 27, 2010, 50 percent of respondents supported Schauer, while 43 percent favored Walberg, 3 percent chose Wunsch, Aughney and Merle received the support of 1 percent apiece, and 2 percent were undecided. An internal poll with a margin of error of 5.6 percent, conducted by National Research Inc. for Walberg's campaign and published on October 28, 2010, found Walberg leading Schauer by 13 percentage points.

Prior to the election FiveThirtyEight's forecast gave Walberg a 59 percent chance of winning and projected that he would receive 49 percent of the vote to Schauer's 48 percent. On election day, Walberg was elected with 50 percent of the vote to Schauer's 45 percent. Walberg was again re-elected in 2012 and 2014. Schauer unsuccessfully ran for Governor of Michigan in 2014.

=== Republican primary results ===
Michigan's 7th district Republican primary, August 3, 2010
Party	Candidate	Votes	%
Republican	Tim Walberg	41,784	57.47
Republican	Brian Rooney	23,505	32.33
Republican	Marvin Carlson	7,413	10.20
Total votes		72,702	100.00

==== Predictions ====
Source	Ranking	As of
The Cook Political Report	Tossup	November 1, 2010
Rothenberg	Tossup	November 1, 2010
Sabato's Crystal Ball	Lean R (flip)	November 1, 2010
RCP	Tossup	November 1, 2010
CQ Politics	Tossup	October 28, 2010
New York Times	Tossup	November 1, 2010
FiveThirtyEight	Tossup	November 1, 2010

=== General election results ===
Michigan's 7th district general election, November 2, 2010
Party	Candidate	Votes	%
Republican	Tim Walberg	113,185	50.16
Democratic	Mark Schauer (incumbent)	102,402	45.38
U.S. Taxpayers'	Scott Aughney	3,705	1.64
Libertarian	Greg Merle	3,239	1.44
Green	Richard Wunsch	3,117	1.38
Write-In	Danny Davis	21	0.01
Total votes		225,669	100.00

=== External links ===
- "Scott Aughney campaign website". Archived from the original on October 28, 2010.
- "Marvin Carlson campaign website". Archived from the original on October 1, 2009.
- "Dan Davis campaign website". Archived from the original on August 21, 2010.
- "Greg Merle campaign website". Archived from the original on October 28, 2010.
- "Brian Rooney campaign website". Archived from the original on July 22, 2010.
- "Mark Schauer campaign website". Archived from the original on October 29, 2010.
- "Tim Walberg campaign website". Archived from the original on October 28, 2010.
- "Richard Wunsch campaign website". Archived from the original on October 28, 2010.

== District 8 ==
2010 Michigan's 8th congressional district election
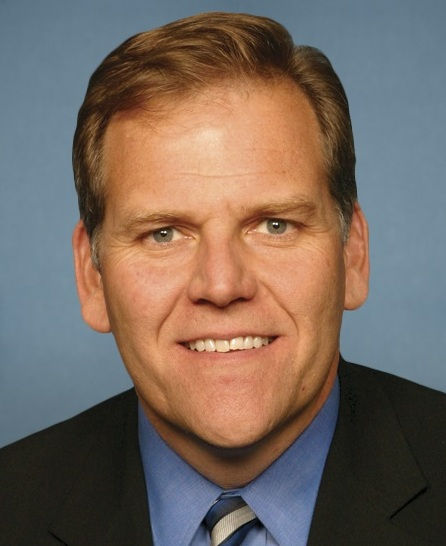

Nominee	Mike Rogers	Lance Enderle
Party	Republican	Democratic
Popular vote	156,931	84,069
Percentage	64.1%	34.3%
- County results Rogers: 50–60% 60–70% 70–80%
U.S. Representative before election
Mike Rogers
Republican
Elected U.S. Representative
Mike Rogers
Republican

Michigan's 8th district

The 8th district included East Lansing, Holt and part of Lansing. The district's population was 87 percent white and 5 percent black (see Race and ethnicity in the United States census); 92 percent were high school graduates and 32 percent had received a bachelor's degree or higher. Its median income was $59,508. In the 2008 presidential election the district gave 53 percent of its vote to Democratic nominee Barack Obama and 46 percent to Republican nominee John McCain.

Republican Mike Rogers, who took office in 2001, was the incumbent. Rogers was re-elected in 2008 with 57 percent of the vote. Rogers announced in February 2009 that he would not run for Governor of Michigan in 2010. Rogers's opponent in 2010 was Democratic nominee Lance Enderle, who ran Leslie's alternative education program. Libertarian Party nominee Bhagwan Dashairya, the president and chief executive officer of Dashairya & Associates, also ran. Rogers ran unopposed in the Republican primary. Enderle ran unopposed as a write-in candidate in the Democratic primary after health care analyst Kande Ngalamulume suspended his campaign after the withdrawal deadline.

Rogers raised $1,778,687 and spent $861,244. Enderle raised $12,339 and spent $12,169. Ngalamulume raised $27,036 and spent the same amount.

Prior to the election FiveThirtyEight's forecast gave Rogers a 100 percent chance of winning and projected that he would receive 63 percent of the vote to Enderle's 34 percent. On election day Rogers was re-elected with 64 percent of the vote to Enderle's 34 percent. Rogers and Enderle both ran again in 2012, when Rogers was again re-elected; Rogers retired rather than seeking re-election in 2014 and was succeeded by Republican Mike Bishop.

=== Predictions ===
Source	Ranking	As of
The Cook Political Report	Safe R	November 1, 2010
Rothenberg	Safe R	November 1, 2010
Sabato's Crystal Ball	Safe R	November 1, 2010
RCP	Safe R	November 1, 2010
CQ Politics	Safe R	October 28, 2010
New York Times	Safe R	November 1, 2010
FiveThirtyEight	Safe R	November 1, 2010

=== General election results ===
Michigan's 8th district general election, November 2, 2010
Party	Candidate	Votes	%
Republican	Mike Rogers (incumbent)	156,931	64.08
Democratic	Lance Enderle	84,069	34.33
Libertarian	Bhagwan Dashairya	3,881	1.58
Write-In	Katherine Houston	11	0.00
Write-In	Eric Harvey	2	0.00
Total votes		244,894	100.00

=== External links ===
- "Bhagwan Dashairya campaign website". Archived from the original on October 28, 2010.
- "Lance Enderle campaign website". Archived from the original on October 3, 2010.
- "Kande Ngalamulume campaign website". Archived from the original on October 9, 2010.
- "Mike Rogers campaign website". Archived from the original on October 28, 2010.

== District 9 ==
2010 Michigan's 9th congressional district election

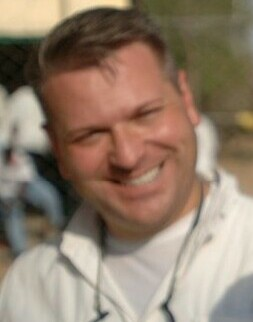
Nominee	Gary Peters	Rocky Raczkowski
Party	Democratic	Republican
Popular vote	125,730	119,325
Percentage	49.8%	47.2%
- County results Peters: 40–50%
U.S. Representative before election
Gary Peters
Democratic
Elected U.S. Representative
Gary Peters
Democratic

The 9th district included Auburn Hills, Farmington Hills, Pontiac, Rochester Hills, Troy and parts of Royal Oak and Waterford. The district's population was 77 percent white, 10 percent black and 7 percent Asian (see Race and ethnicity in the United States census); 93 percent were high school graduates and 48 percent had received a bachelor's degree or higher. Its median income was $72,774. In the 2008 presidential election the district gave 56 percent of its vote to Democratic nominee Barack Obama and 43 percent to Republican nominee John McCain.

Democrat Gary Peters, who took office in 2009, was the incumbent. Peters was elected in 2008 with 52 percent of the vote. In January 2010 Peters said he would not run for Governor of Michigan that year. Peters's opponent in 2010 was Republican nominee Rocky Raczkowski, a former member of the Michigan Legislature. Green Party nominee Douglas Campbell, an engineer; and independent candidate Matthew Kuofie, a professor at institutions including the University of Michigan, also ran. Libertarian Party nominee Adam Goodman, a district manager for Ovations Dining; and independent candidate Bob Gray, an educator and former member of the executive board of the Michigan Republican Party, both of whose names appeared on the ballot, ended their campaigns prior to the election.

Peters ran unopposed in the Democratic primary. Anna Janek, a beauty consultant; Richard Kuhn, a former circuit court judge; and Paul Welday, a businessman, also sought the Republican nomination. Gene Goodman, a manufacturer, ran as a Republican but ended his campaign in May 2010. A poll of 120 likely Republican voters, conducted by Mitchell Research & Communication for Welday's campaign on March 31 and April 1, 2010, and on April 4 and 5, 2010, found Welday leading with 25 percent to Raczkowski's 17 percent, while Goodman received 2 percent. In a poll of 900 likely Republican voters, conducted by Strategic National for Raczkowski's campaign on April 29, 2010, 26 percent of respondents favored Raczkowski while 15 percent supported Welday and 59 percent were undecided.

Peters raised $3,284,646 and spent $3,236,452. Raczkowski raised $2,038,244 and spent $1,995,898. Kuhn raised $51,378 and spent the same amount. Welday raised $561,897 and spent $560,794. Goodman raised $16,118 and spent the same amount.

In a poll conducted by The Rossman Group and Team TelCom, the results of which were published in September 2010, 45 percent of the 300 respondents intended to vote for Raczkowski while 41 percent supported Peters and 10 percent were undecided. A poll of 400 people, conducted by EPIC/MRA on October 16 and 17, 2010, found Peters leading with 48 percent to Raczkowski's 43 percent. In a poll by Great Lakes Strategies, published later in October 2010 and with a sample size of 700, Raczkowski led with 48 percent to Peters's 43 percent.

Prior to the election FiveThirtyEight's forecast gave Peters a 76 percent chance of winning and projected that he would receive 51 percent of the vote to Raczkowski's 47 percent. On election day Peters was re-elected with 50 percent of the vote to Raczkowski's 47 percent. Peters was re-elected in the new 14th district in 2012; and elected to the U.S. Senate in 2014.

=== Republican primary results ===
Michigan's 9th district Republican primary, August 3, 2010
Party	Candidate	Votes	%
Republican	Rocky Raczkowski	33,459	41.97
Republican	Paul Welday	22,298	27.97
Republican	Richard Kuhn	15,949	20.01
Republican	Anna Janek	8,006	10.04
Total votes		79,712	100.00

==== Predictions ====
Source	Ranking	As of
The Cook Political Report	Lean D	November 1, 2010
Rothenberg	Lean D	November 1, 2010
Sabato's Crystal Ball	Lean D	November 1, 2010
RCP	Tossup	November 1, 2010
CQ Politics	Likely D	October 28, 2010
New York Times	Lean D	November 1, 2010
FiveThirtyEight	Likely D	November 1, 2010

=== General election results ===
Michigan's 9th district general election, November 2, 2010
Party	Candidate	Votes	%
Democratic	Gary Peters (incumbent)	125,730	49.76
Republican	Rocky Raczkowski	119,325	47.23
Libertarian	Adam Goodman	2,601	1.03
Green	Douglas Campbell	2,484	0.98
Independent	Bob Gray	1,866	0.74
Independent	Matthew Kuofie	644	0.25
Total votes		252,650	100.00

=== See also ===
- Electoral history of Gary Peters

=== External links ===
- "Adam Goodman campaign website". Archived from the original on October 29, 2010.
- "Bob Gray campaign website". Archived from the original on October 31, 2010.
- "Anna Janek campaign website". Archived from the original on April 10, 2010.
- "Matthew Kuofie campaign website". Archived from the original on October 28, 2010.
- "Gary Peters campaign website". Archived from the original on October 29, 2010.
- "Rocky Raczkowski campaign website". Archived from the original on November 1, 2010.
- "Paul Welday campaign website". Archived from the original on June 9, 2010.

== District 10 ==
2010 Michigan's 10th congressional district election
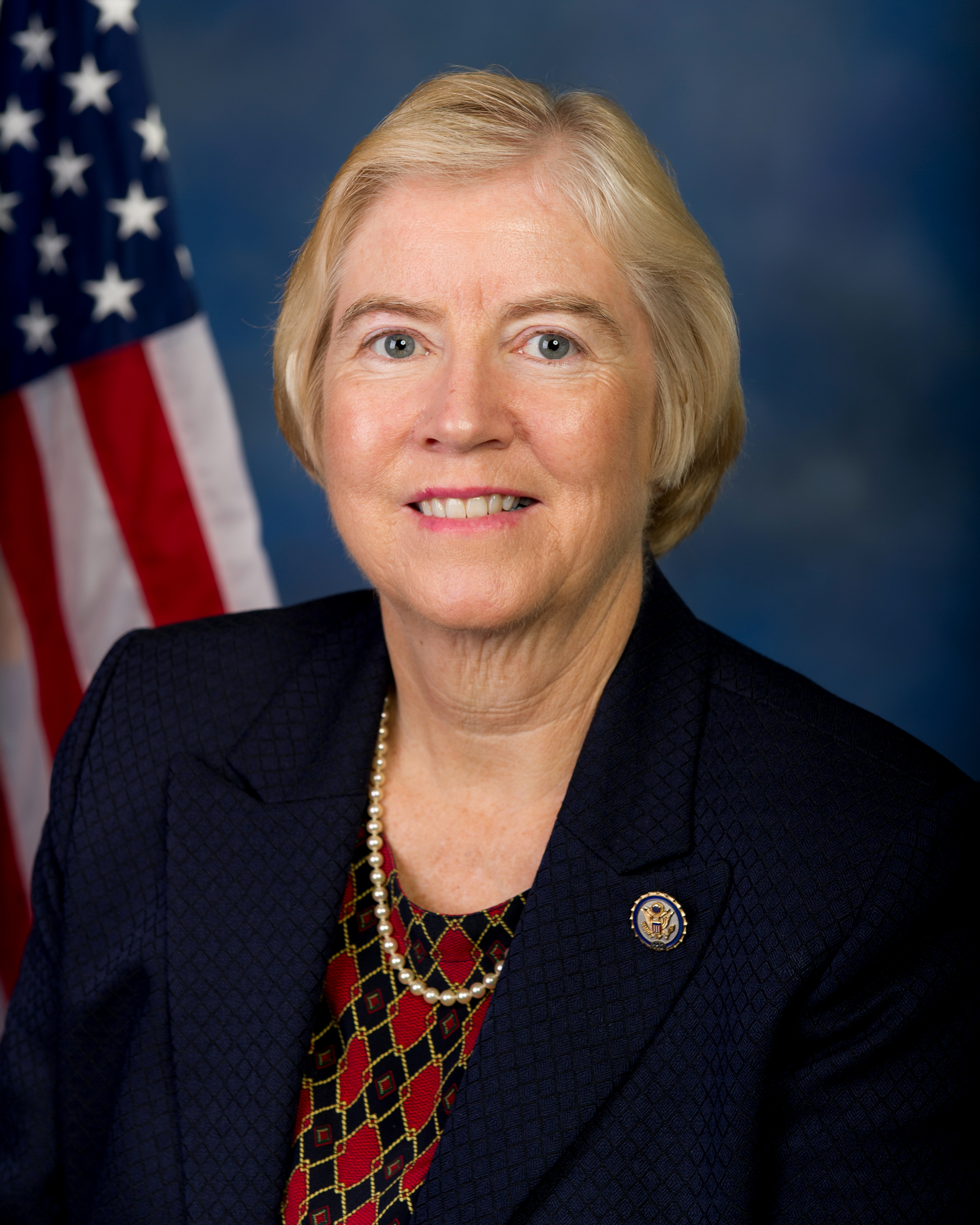

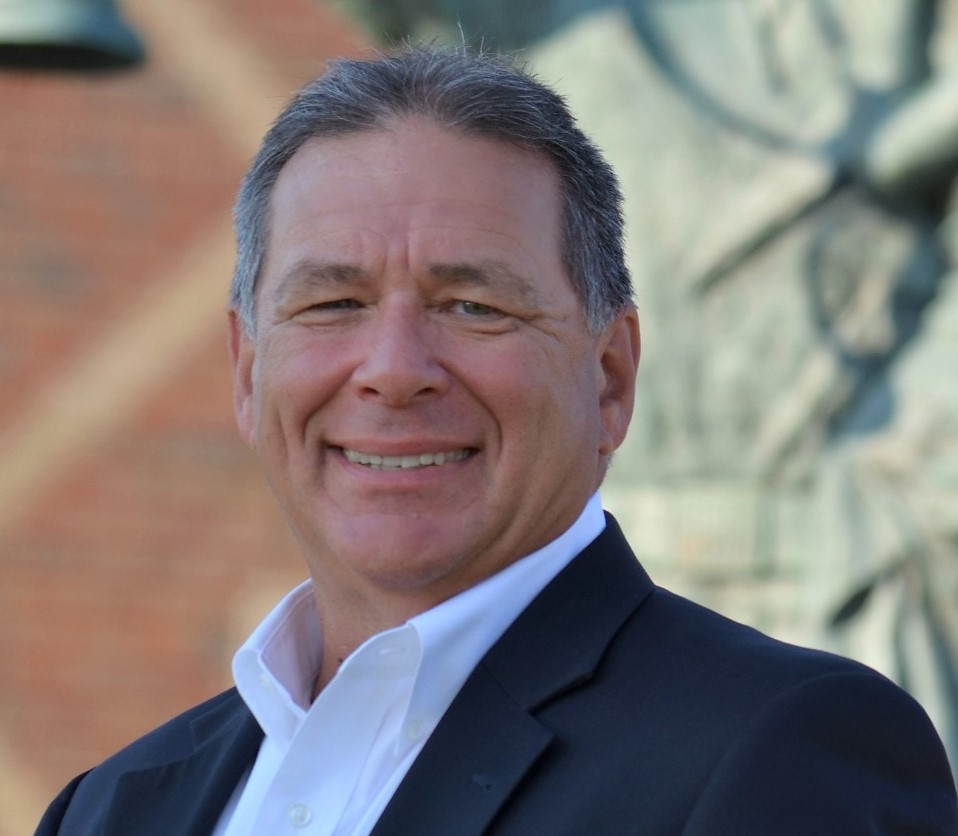
Nominee	Candice Miller	Henry Yanez
Party	Republican	Democratic
Popular vote	168,364	58,530
Percentage	72.0%	25.0%
- County results Miller: 60–70% 70–80%
U.S. Representative before election
Candice Miller
Republican
Elected U.S. Representative
Candice Miller
Republican

Michigan's 10th congressional district in 2010

The 10th district included Port Huron, Shelby and part of Sterling Heights. The district's population was 92 percent white (see Race and ethnicity in the United States census); 88 percent were high school graduates and 21 percent had received a bachelor's degree or higher. Its median income was $58,791. In the 2008 presidential election the district gave 50 percent of its vote to Republican nominee John McCain and 48 percent to Democratic nominee Barack Obama.

Republican Candice Miller, who took office in 2003, was the incumbent. Miller was re-elected in 2008 with 66 percent of the vote. In 2010 her opponent in the general election was Democratic nominee Henry Yanez, a firefighter and paramedic. Libertarian Party nominee Claude Beavers, a private practice attorney; and Green Party nominee Candace R. Caveny, a retired Doctor of Osteopathic Medicine, also ran. Both Miller and Yanez ran unopposed in their respective party primaries.

Miller raised $761,649 and spent $846,119. Prior to the election FiveThirtyEight's forecast gave Miller a 100 percent chance of winning and projected that she would receive 69 percent of the vote to Yanez's 29 percent. On election day Miller was re-elected with 72 percent of the vote to Yanez's 25 percent. Miller was again re-elected in 2012 and 2014.

=== Predictions ===
Source	Ranking	As of
The Cook Political Report	Safe R	November 1, 2010
Rothenberg	Safe R	November 1, 2010
Sabato's Crystal Ball	Safe R	November 1, 2010
RCP	Safe R	November 1, 2010
CQ Politics	Safe R	October 28, 2010
New York Times	Safe R	November 1, 2010
FiveThirtyEight	Safe R	November 1, 2010

=== General election results ===
Michigan's 10th district general election, November 2, 2010
Party	Candidate	Votes	%
Republican	Candice Miller (incumbent)	168,364	71.97
Democratic	Henry Yanez	58,530	25.02
Libertarian	Claude Beavers	3,750	1.60
Green	Candace Caveny	3,286	1.40
Total votes		233,930	100.00

=== External links ===
- "Claude Beavers campaign website". Archived from the original on October 28, 2010.
- "Candace Caveny campaign website". Archived from the original on October 29, 2010.
- "Candice Miller campaign website". Archived from the original on October 29, 2010.
- "Henry Yanez campaign website". Archived from the original on November 1, 2010.

== District 11 ==
2010 Michigan's 11th congressional district election
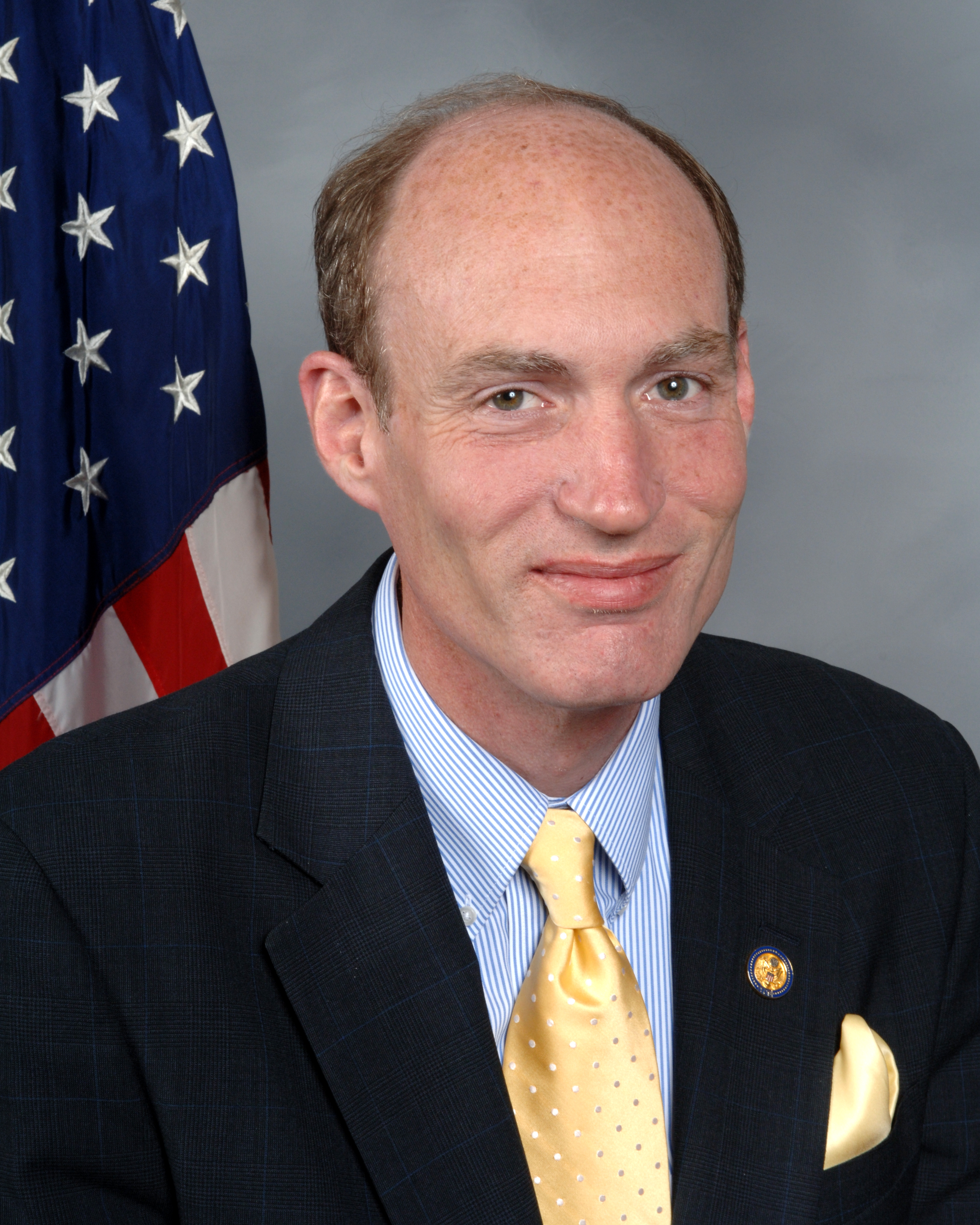

Nominee	Thaddeus McCotter	Natalie Mosher
Party	Republican	Democratic
Popular vote	141,224	91,710
Percentage	59.3%	38.5%
- County results Mccotter: 50–60% 60–70%
U.S. Representative before election
Thaddeus McCotter
Republican
Elected U.S. Representative
Thaddeus McCotter
Republican

Michigan's 11th congressional district in 2010

The 11th district included Canton, Garden City, Livonia, Novi, Redford and Westland. The district's population was 83 percent white, 7 percent black and 5 percent Asian (see Race and ethnicity in the United States census); 91 percent were high school graduates and 33 percent had received a bachelor's degree or higher. Its median income was $66,868. In the 2008 presidential election the district gave 54 percent of its vote to Democratic nominee Barack Obama and 45 percent to Republican nominee John McCain.

Republican Thaddeus McCotter, who took office in 2003, was the incumbent. McCotter was re-elected in 2008 with 51 percent of the vote. In 2010 McCotter's opponent in the general election was Democratic nominee Natalie Mosher, a nonprofit consultant. Libertarian Party nominee John J. Tatar, the owner of a construction company, also ran. McCotter and Mosher were unopposed in their respective party primaries. Andy Dillon, the speaker of the Michigan House of Representatives, said in March 2009 that he would not seek the Democratic nomination.

McCotter raised $1,195,301 and spent $870,514. Mosher raised $307,081 and spent the same amount. Prior to the election FiveThirtyEight's forecast gave McCotter a 99 percent chance of winning and projected that he would receive 58 percent of the vote to Mosher's 39 percent. On election day McCotter was re-elected with 59 percent of the vote to Mosher's 38 percent.

In July 2011, McCotter announced he would run for president in 2012. McCotter ended his campaign in September 2011 and resigned as a U.S. Representative in June 2012 after failing to qualify for the primary ballot. He was succeeded by Democrat David Curson. In 2014 Mosher unsuccessfully sought the Democratic nomination in the Michigan House of Representatives's 21st district.

=== Predictions ===
Source	Ranking	As of
The Cook Political Report	Safe R	November 1, 2010
Rothenberg	Safe R	November 1, 2010
Sabato's Crystal Ball	Safe R	November 1, 2010
RCP	Safe R	November 1, 2010
CQ Politics	Safe R	October 28, 2010
New York Times	Safe R	November 1, 2010
FiveThirtyEight	Safe R	November 1, 2010

=== General election results ===
Michigan's 11th district general election, November 2, 2010
Party	Candidate	Votes	%
Republican	Thaddeus McCotter (incumbent)	141,224	59.27
Democratic	Natalie Mosher	91,710	38.49
Libertarian	John Tatar	5,353	2.25
Total votes		238,287	100.00

=== External links ===
- "Thaddeus McCotter campaign website". Archived from the original on October 28, 2010.
- "Natalie Mosher campaign website". Archived from the original on October 30, 2010.
- "John Tatar campaign website". Archived from the original on October 28, 2010.

== District 12 ==
2010 Michigan's 12th congressional district election
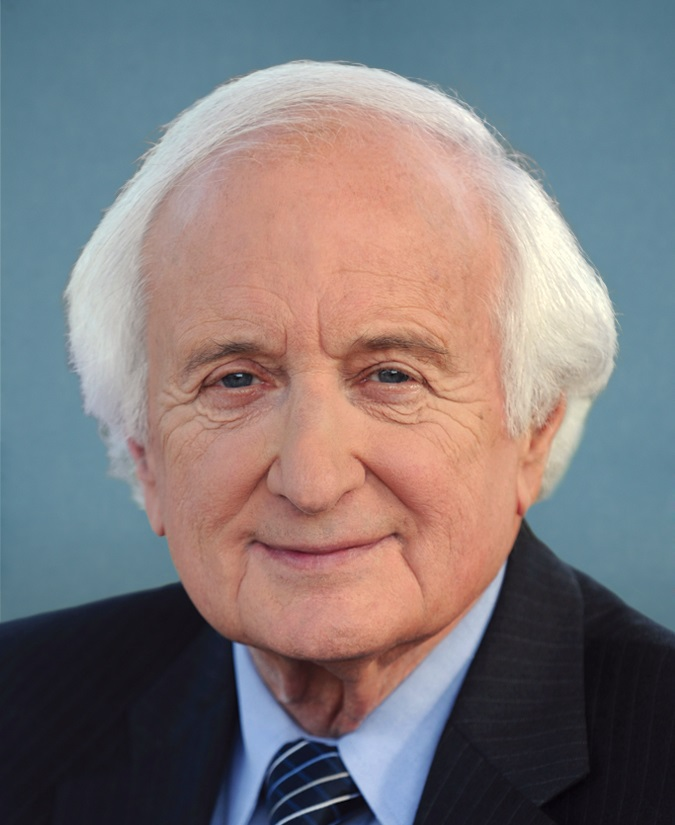

Nominee	Sander Levin	Don Volaric
Party	Democratic	Republican
Popular vote	124,671	71,372
Percentage	61.1%	35.0%
- County results Levin: 50–60% 70–80%
U.S. Representative before election
Sander Levin
Democratic
Elected U.S. Representative
Sander Levin
Democratic

Michigan's 12th congressional district in 2010

The 12th district included Clinton, Roseville, Southfield, St. Clair Shores, Warren and part of Sterling Heights. The district's population was 75 percent white and 18 percent black (see Race and ethnicity in the United States census); 86 percent were high school graduates and 21 percent had received a bachelor's degree or higher. Its median income was $49,559. In the 2008 presidential election the district gave 65 percent of its vote to Democratic nominee Barack Obama and 33 percent to Republican nominee John McCain.

Democrat Sander Levin, who took office in 1983, was the incumbent. He was re-elected in 2008 with 72 percent of the vote. In 2010 his opponent in the general election was Republican nominee Don Volaric, the owner of a health insurance agency. Natural Law Party nominee Alan Jacquemotte; Libertarian Party nominee Leonard Schwartz, a lawyer and former professor of business law; U.S. Taxpayers Party nominee Les Townsend, a former officer of the Internal Revenue Service; and Green Party nominee Julia Williams, a critical care and emergency room nurse, also ran.

Michael Switalski, a member of the Michigan Senate, also sought the Democratic nomination. In a poll of 400 likely Democratic primary voters, taken on March 17 and 18, 2010 by the Mellmann Group for Levin's campaign, 62 percent of respondents favored Levin while 14 percent supported Switalski and 24 percent were undecided. Volaric was unopposed in the Republican primary.

Levin raised $2,345,155 and spent $2,392,309. Volaric raised $62,174 and spent $57,383. Switalski raised $51,553 and spent $46,450.

Prior to the election FiveThirtyEight's forecast gave Levin a 100 percent chance of winning and projected that he would receive 67 percent of the vote to Volaric's 30 percent. On election day Levin was re-elected with 61 percent of the vote to Volaric's 35 percent. Levin was re-elected in 2012, again against Volaric, and in 2014.

=== Democratic primary results ===
Michigan's 12th district Democratic primary, August 3, 2010
Party	Candidate	Votes	%
Democratic	Sander Levin (incumbent)	42,732	75.86
Democratic	Michael Switalski	13,480	24.14
Total votes		55,852	100.00

==== Predictions ====
Source	Ranking	As of
The Cook Political Report	Safe D	November 1, 2010
Rothenberg	Safe D	November 1, 2010
Sabato's Crystal Ball	Safe D	November 1, 2010
RCP	Safe D	November 1, 2010
CQ Politics	Safe D	October 28, 2010
New York Times	Safe D	November 1, 2010
FiveThirtyEight	Safe D	November 1, 2010

=== General election results ===
Michigan's 12th district general election, November 2, 2010
Party	Candidate	Votes	%
Democratic	Sander Levin (incumbent)	124,671	61.08
Republican	Don Volaric	71,372	34.97
Green	Julia Williams	3,038	1.49
Libertarian	Leonard Schwartz	2,342	1.15
U.S. Taxpayers'	Les Townsend	2,285	1.12
Natural Law	Alan Jacquemotte	409	0.20
Total votes		204,117	100.00

=== External links ===
- "Carl Levin campaign website". Archived from the original on October 28, 2010.
- "Leonard Schwartz campaign website". Archived from the original on January 10, 2014.
- "Michael Switalski campaign website". Archived from the original on September 25, 2009.
- "Les Townsend campaign website". Archived from the original on November 1, 2010.
- "Don Volaric campaign website". Archived from the original on October 28, 2010.
- "Julia Williams campaign website". Archived from the original on October 28, 2010.

== District 13 ==
2010 Michigan's 13th congressional district election
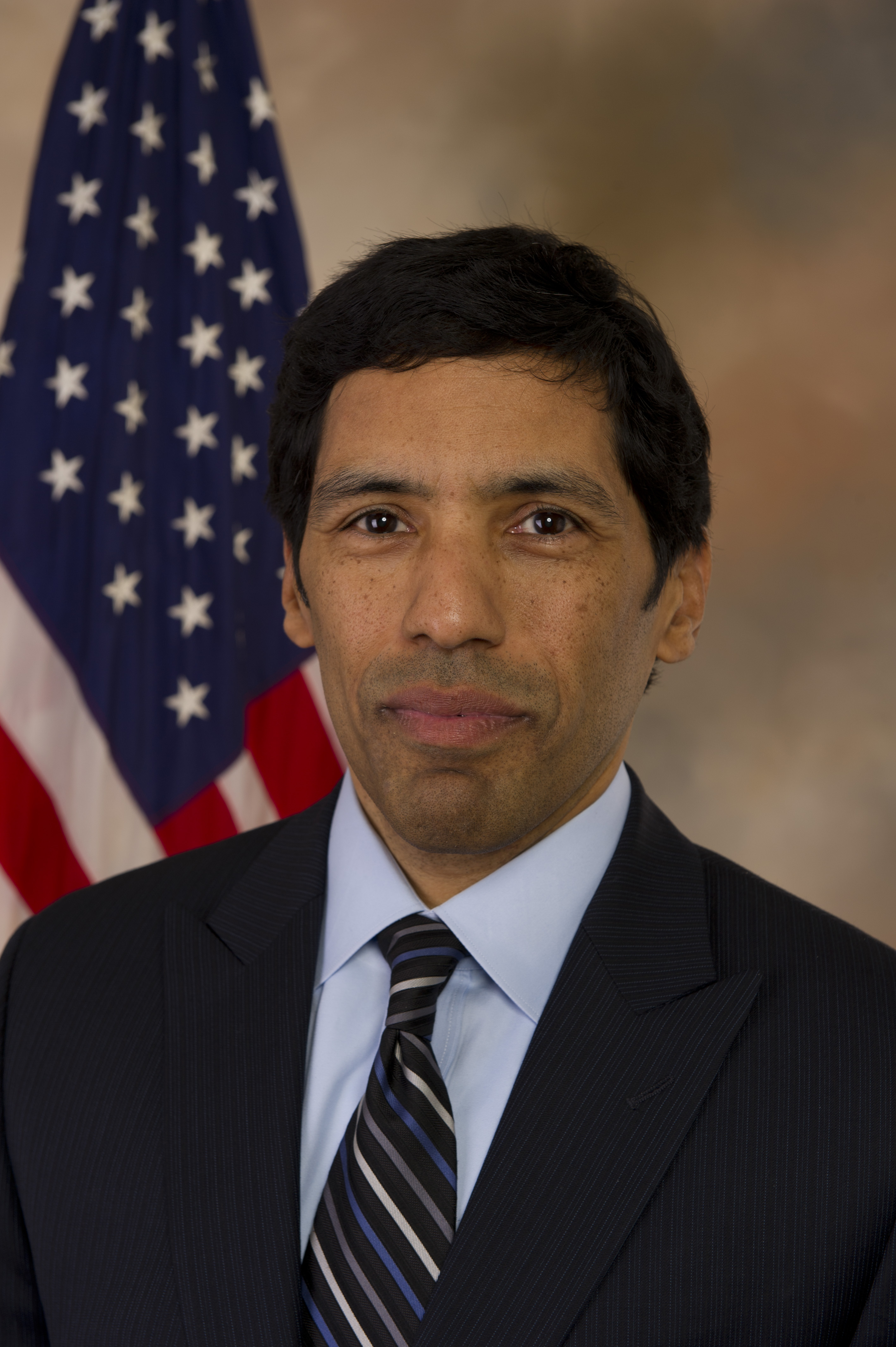

Nominee	Hansen Clarke	John Hauler
Party	Democratic	Republican
Popular vote	100,885	23,462
Percentage	79.4%	18.5%
- County results Clarke: 70–80%
U.S. Representative before election
Carolyn Cheeks Kilpatrick
Democratic
Elected U.S. Representative
Hansen Clarke
Democratic

Michigan's 13th congressional district in 2010

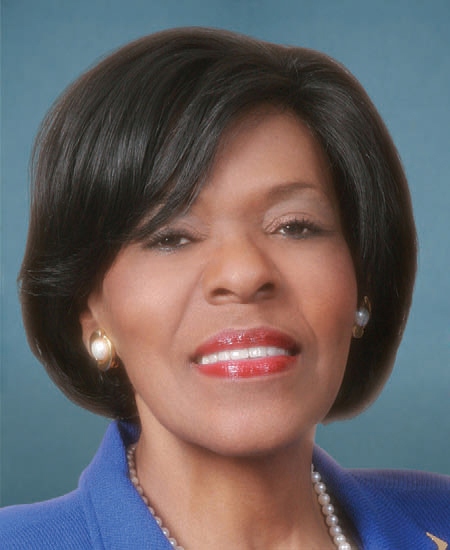
Carolyn Cheeks Kilpatrick, who unsuccessfully sought re-election in the 13th district

The 13th district included parts of Detroit and Lincoln Park. The district's population was 59 percent black, 28 percent white and 10 percent Hispanic (see Race and ethnicity in the United States census); 76 percent were high school graduates and 15 percent had received a bachelor's degree or higher. Its median income was $32,212. In the 2008 presidential election the district gave 85 percent of its vote to Democratic nominee Barack Obama and 14 percent to Republican nominee John McCain.

Democrat Carolyn Cheeks Kilpatrick, who took office in 1997, was the incumbent. Kilpatrick was re-elected in 2008 with 74 percent of the vote. In 2010 Hansen Clarke, a member of the Michigan Senate, successfully challenged Kilpatrick in the Democratic primary. In the general election Clarke faced Republican nominee John Hauler, a military contractor and the founder of the Metro Detroit Freedom Coalition; Green Party nominee George Corsetti, a criminal defense attorney; independent candidate Duane Montgomery, an information system consultant; and Libertarian Party nominee Heidi Peterson, an actress and model. John W. Broad, the president of Crime Stoppers of Michigan; Vincent T. Brown, a community organizer with Clean Water Action; Stephen Hume, a boat yard operator; and Glenn Plummer, the founder and chair of the Christian Television Network, also sought the Democratic nomination. Hauler ran unopposed in the Republican primary.

In a poll with a sample size of 137, conducted by Practical Political Consulting and Inside Michigan Politics and released in June 2010, Clarke led with 27 percent to Kilpatrick's 19 percent. A poll of 400 likely voters conducted by EPIC/MRA on July 6 and 7, 2010, found Clarke leading with 44 percent to Kilpatrick's 31 percent, while Broad, Brown, Hume and Plummer collectively received 9 percent. In a poll conducted by The Detroit News and WDIV, released on July 16, 2010, 38 percent of respondents supported Clarke while 30 percent favored Kilpatrick.

Kilpatrick raised $640,991 and spent $784,219. Clarke raised $578,399 and spent $346,510. Hauler raised $33,160 and spent $16,855. Broad raised $228,690 and spent $133,148. Plummer raised $55,113 and spent $53,401.

Prior to the election FiveThirtyEight's forecast gave Clarke a 100 percent chance of winning and projected that he would receive 68 percent of the vote to Hauler's 29 percent. On election day Clarke was elected with 79 percent of the vote to Hauler's 18 percent. Clarke ran unsuccessfully in the Democratic primary in the redrawn 14th district in 2012, when Hauler was again unsuccessful as the Republican nominee; and in 2014.

=== Democratic primary results ===
Michigan's 13th district Democratic primary, August 3, 2010
Party	Candidate	Votes	%
Democratic	Hansen Clarke	22,573	47.32
Democratic	Carolyn Cheeks Kilpatrick (incumbent)	19,507	40.89
Democratic	Glenn Plummer	2,038	4.27
Democratic	John Broad	1,872	3.92
Democratic	Vincent Brown	893	1.87
Democratic	Stephen Hume	820	1.72
Total votes		47,703	100.00

==== Predictions ====
Source	Ranking	As of
The Cook Political Report	Safe D	November 1, 2010
Rothenberg	Safe D	November 1, 2010
Sabato's Crystal Ball	Safe D	November 1, 2010
RCP	Safe D	November 1, 2010
CQ Politics	Safe D	October 28, 2010
New York Times	Safe D	November 1, 2010
FiveThirtyEight	Safe D	November 1, 2010

=== General election results ===
Michigan's 13th district general election, November 2, 2010
Party	Candidate	Votes	%
Democratic	Hansen Clarke	100,885	79.39
Republican	John Hauler	23,462	18.46
Green	George Corsetti	1,032	0.81
Independent	Duane Montgomery	881	0.69
Libertarian	Heidi Peterson	815	0.64
Write-In	James Casha	1	0.00
Total votes		127,076	100.00

=== See also ===
- Electoral history of Hansen Clarke

=== External links ===
- "Hansen Clarke campaign website". Archived from the original on October 28, 2010.
- "George Corsetti campaign website". Archived from the original on October 28, 2010.
- "John Hauler campaign website". Archived from the original on October 29, 2010.
- "Carolyn Cheeks Kilpatrick campaign website". Archived from the original on July 17, 2010.
- "Duane Montgomery campaign website". Archived from the original on October 28, 2010.
- "Heidi Peterson campaign website". Archived from the original on October 28, 2010.

== District 14 ==
2010 Michigan's 14th congressional district election
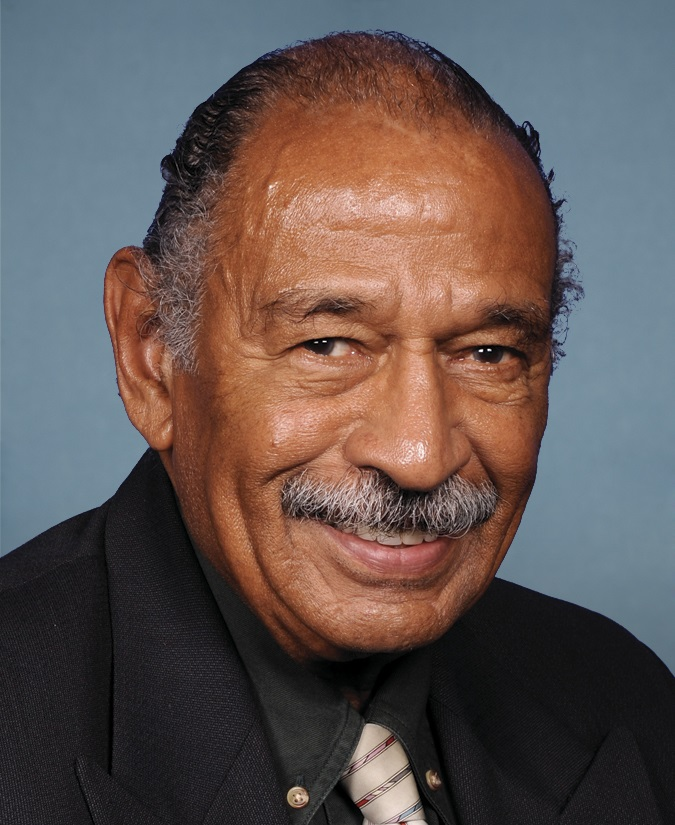

Nominee	John Conyers	Don Ukrainec
Party	Democratic	Republican
Popular vote	115,511	29,902
Percentage	76.8%	19.9%
- County results Conyers: 70–80%
U.S. Representative before election
John Conyers
Democratic
Elected U.S. Representative
John Conyers
Democratic

Michigan's 14th congressional district in 2010

The 14th district included Allen Park, Hamtramck, Southgate and parts of Dearborn and Detroit. The district's population was 60 percent black and 34 percent white (see Race and ethnicity in the United States census); 81 percent were high school graduates and 16 percent had received a bachelor's degree or higher. Its median income was $37,323. In the 2008 presidential election the district gave 86 percent of its vote to Democratic nominee Barack Obama and 13 percent to Republican nominee John McCain.

Democrat John Conyers, who took office in 1965, was the incumbent. Conyers was re-elected in 2008 with 92 percent of the vote. In 2010 his opponent in the general election was Republican nominee Don Ukrainec, an instructor in the Riverview Community School District. Libertarian Party nominee Richard J. Secula, a former skilled tradesman; and U.S. Taxpayers Party nominee Marc J. Sosnowski, a property manager, also ran. Conyers was unopposed in the Democratic primary. Pauline Montie, the owner of Montie's Shell, Montie's Service and Al's Garage, also sought the Republican nomination.

Conyers raised $1,137,010 and spent $1,127,587. Ukrainec raised $16,506 and raised the same amount. Prior to the election FiveThirtyEight's forecast gave Conyers a 100 percent chance of winning and projected that he would receive 77 percent of the vote to Ukrainec's 21 percent. On election day Conyers was re-elected with 77 percent of the vote to Ukrainec's 20 percent. Conyers was again re-elected in 2012 and 2014.

=== Republican primary results ===
Michigan's 14th district Republican primary, August 2, 2010
Party	Candidate	Votes	%
Republican	Don Ukrainec	7,435	55.43
Republican	Pauline Montie	5,978	44.57
Total votes		13,413	100.00

==== Predictions ====
Source	Ranking	As of
The Cook Political Report	Safe D	November 1, 2010
Rothenberg	Safe D	November 1, 2010
Sabato's Crystal Ball	Safe D	November 1, 2010
RCP	Safe D	November 1, 2010
CQ Politics	Safe D	October 28, 2010
New York Times	Safe D	November 1, 2010
FiveThirtyEight	Safe D	November 1, 2010

=== General election results ===
Michigan's 14th district general election, November 2, 2010
Party	Candidate	Votes	%
Democratic	John Conyers (incumbent)	115,511	76.76
Republican	Don Ukrainec	29,902	19.87
U.S. Taxpayers'	Marc Sosnowski	3,206	2.13
Libertarian	Richard Secula	1,859	1.24
Total votes		150,478	100.00

=== See also ===
- Electoral history of John Conyers

=== External links ===
- "John Conyers campaign website". Archived from the original on October 29, 2010.
- "Pauline Montie campaign website". Archived from the original on July 24, 2010.
- "Rick Secula campaign website". Archived from the original on October 28, 2010.
- "Marc J. Sosnowski campaign website". Archived from the original on October 28, 2010.
- "Don Ukrainec campaign website". Archived from the original on October 29, 2010.

== District 15 ==
2010 Michigan's 15th congressional district election
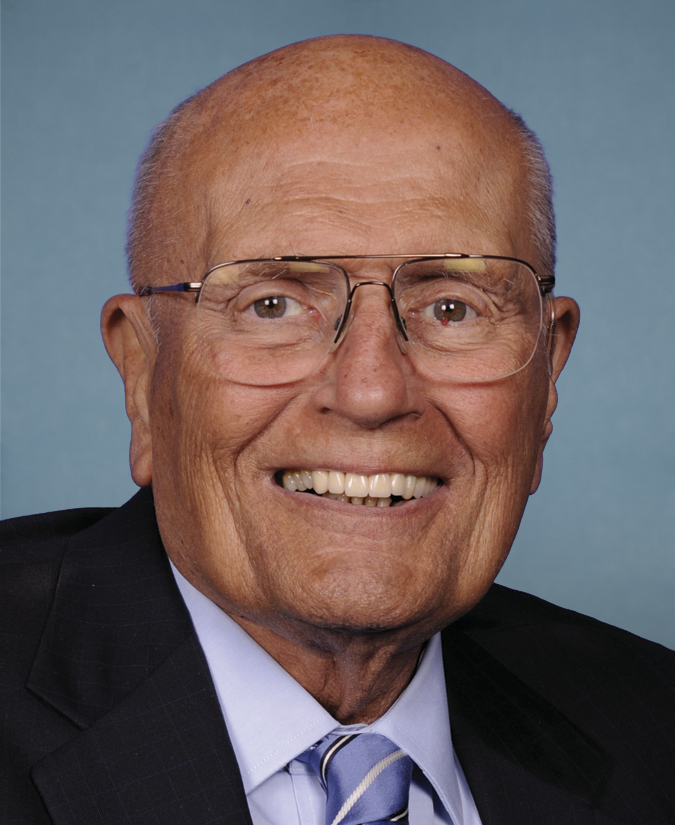

Nominee	John Dingell	Rob Steele
Party	Democratic	Republican
Popular vote	118,336	83,488
Percentage	56.8%	40.1%
- County results Dingell: 50–60% 60–70% Steele: 50–60%
U.S. Representative before election
John Dingell
Democratic
Elected U.S. Representative
John Dingell
Democratic

Michigan's 15th congressional district in 2010

The 15th district included Inkster, Monroe, Romulus, Taylor and parts of Ann Arbor, Dearborn and Dearborn Heights. The district's population was 77 percent white, 13 percent black and 5 percent Asian (see Race and ethnicity in the United States census); 88 percent were high school graduates and 29 percent had received a bachelor's degree or higher. Its median income was $54,013. In the 2008 presidential election the district gave 66 percent its vote to Democratic nominee Barack Obama and 33 percent to Republican nominee John McCain.

Democrat John Dingell, who took office in 1955, was the incumbent. Dingell was re-elected in 2008 with 71 percent of the vote. In 2010 Dingell's opponent in the general election was Republican nominee Rob Steele, a cardiologist. U.S. Taxpayers Party nominee Matthew Lawrence Furman, who formerly worked in equipment repair and maintenance at the University of Michigan; Libertarian Party nominee Kerry L. Morgan, an attorney; and Green Party nominee Aimee Smith, the vice chair of the Green Party of Michigan, also ran. Dingell was unopposed in the Democratic primary. Tony Amorose, a teacher with Dearborn Public Schools; John J. "Jack" Lynch, a database systems project manager with the Eaton Corporation; and Majed A. Moughni, an attorney, also sought the Republican nomination.

Dingell raised $1,960,195 and spent $2,790,616. Steele raised $1,059,929 and spent the same amount. Amorose raised $6,475 and spent $6,370. Lynch raised $17,750 and spent $17,971.

In a poll of 400 likely voters, conducted in the week preceding September 20, 2010, by Glengariff Group Inc., 49 percent of respondents supported Dingell while 30 percent favored Steele. A poll with a sample size of 300, conducted by the Rossman Group and Team TelCom on October 4, 2010, found Steele leading with 44 percent to Dingell's 40 percent while 11 percent were undecided. In a poll of 400 likely voters, conducted by EPIC/MRA between October 16 and 19, 2010, Dingell led with 53 percent to Steele's 36 percent.

Prior to the election FiveThirtyEight's forecast gave Dingell a 100 percent chance of winning and projected that he would receive 59 percent of the vote to Steele's 38 percent. On election day Dingell was re-elected with 57 percent of the vote to Steele's 40 percent. Dingell was again re-elected in 2012, and in 2014 retired rather than seeking re-election. He was succeeded by his wife Deborah Dingell.

=== Republican primary results ===
Michigan's 15th district Republican primary, August 3, 2010
Party	Candidate	Votes	%
Republican	Rob Steele	18,358	50.76
Republican	John Lynch	11,946	33.03
Republican	Tony Amorose	4,488	12.41
Republican	Majed Moughni	1,374	3.80
Total votes		36,166	100.00

==== Predictions ====
Source	Ranking	As of
The Cook Political Report	Safe D	November 1, 2010
Rothenberg	Safe D	November 1, 2010
Sabato's Crystal Ball	Safe D	November 1, 2010
RCP	Lean D	November 1, 2010
CQ Politics	Safe D	October 28, 2010
New York Times	Lean D	November 1, 2010
FiveThirtyEight	Safe D	November 1, 2010

=== General election results ===
Michigan's 15th district general election, November 2, 2010
Party	Candidate	Votes	%
Democratic	John Dingell (incumbent)	118,336	56.81
Republican	Rob Steele	83,488	40.08
Green	Aimee Smith	2,686	1.29
Libertarian	Kerry Morgan	1,969	0.95
U.S. Taxpayers'	Matthew Furman	1,821	0.87
Write-In	Louis Czako	9	0.00
Total votes		208,309	100.00

=== See also ===
- Electoral history of John Dingell

=== External links ===
- "John Dingell campaign website". Archived from the original on October 28, 2010.
- "Matt Furman campaign website". Archived from the original on October 28, 2010.
- "Kerry Morgan campaign website". Archived from the original on October 28, 2010.
- "Rob Steele campaign website". Archived from the original on October 29, 2010.

== See also ==
- List of United States representatives from Michigan
- Michigan's congressional delegations
