= Electoral history of John Conyers =

List of elections featuring John Conyers as a candidate

This is the electoral history of John Conyers, the most senior member of the United States House of Representatives from 2015 to 2017. He was first elected in 1964, and re-elected in every subsequent election.

== Almanac ==
United States Congressional service
Dates	Congress	Chamber	Majority	President	District
1965–1967	89th	U.S. House	Democratic	Lyndon Johnson	District 1
1967–1969	90th	U.S. House	Democratic	Lyndon Johnson	District 1
1969–1971	91st	U.S. House	Democratic	Richard Nixon	District 1
1971–1973	92nd	U.S. House	Democratic	Richard Nixon	District 1
1973–1975	93rd	U.S. House	Democratic	Richard Nixon; Gerald Ford	District 1
1975–1977	94th	U.S. House	Democratic	Gerald Ford	District 1
1977–1979	95th	U.S. House	Democratic	Jimmy Carter	District 1
1979–1981	96th	U.S. House	Democratic	Jimmy Carter	District 1
1981–1983	97th	U.S. House	Democratic	Ronald Reagan	District 1
1983–1985	98th	U.S. House	Democratic	Ronald Reagan	District 1
1985–1987	99th	U.S. House	Democratic	Ronald Reagan	District 1
1987–1989	100th	U.S. House	Democratic	Ronald Reagan	District 1
1989–1991	101st	U.S. House	Democratic	George H. W. Bush	District 1
1991–1993	102nd	U.S. House	Democratic	George H. W. Bush	District 1
1993–1995	103rd	U.S. House	Democratic	Bill Clinton	District 14
1995–1997	104th	U.S. House	Republican	Bill Clinton	District 14
1997–1999	105th	U.S. House	Republican	Bill Clinton	District 14
1999–2001	106th	U.S. House	Republican	Bill Clinton	District 14
2001–2003	107th	U.S. House	Republican	George W. Bush	District 14
2003–2005	108th	U.S. House	Republican	George W. Bush	District 14
2005–2007	109th	U.S. House	Republican	George W. Bush	District 14
2007–2009	110th	U.S. House	Democratic	George W. Bush	District 14
2009–2011	111th	U.S. House	Democratic	Barack Obama	District 14
2011–2013	112th	U.S. House	Republican	Barack Obama	District 14
2013–2015	113th	U.S. House	Republican	Barack Obama	District 13
2015–2017	114th	U.S. House	Republican	Barack Obama	District 13
2017	115th	U.S. House	Republican	Donald Trump	District 13

== Election results ==
Michigan's 1st congressional district: Results 1964–1990
Year	Democrat	Votes	%	Republican	Votes	%	Third Party	Party	Votes	%	Third Party	Party	Votes	%	Third Party	Party	Votes	%
1964	John Conyers	138,589	84%	Robert Blackwell	25,735	16%	Milton Henry	Freedom Now	1,504	1%								
1966	John Conyers	89,808	84%	Reecha Ross	16,853	16%												
1968	John Conyers	127,847	100%	No candidate														
1970	John Conyers	93,075	88%	Howard Johnson	11,876	11%	Jacqueline Rice	Socialist Workers	617	1%								
1972	John Conyers	131,353	88%	Walter Girardot	16,096	11%	Nina Hubbard	American Independent	817	1%	Maceo Dixon	Socialist Workers	337	0%				
1974	John Conyers	97,620	91%	Walter Girardot	9,358	9%	Hattie McCutcheon	Socialist Workers	419	0%	Lewis Steinhardt	U.S. Labor	176	0%				
1976	John Conyers	126,161	92%	Isaac Hood	8,927	7%	Hector McGregor	American Independent	727	1%	B.R. Washington	Socialist Workers	306	0%	Thomas Jones	Libertarian	245	0%
1978	John Conyers	89,646	93%	Robert Arnold	6,878	7%												
1980	John Conyers	123,286	95%	William Bell	6,244	5%	Thomas Jones	Libertarian	699	1%								
1982	John Conyers	125,517	97%	No candidate			Bill Krebaum	Libertarian	3,188	2%	Eddie Benjamin	Workers League	1,140	1%				
1984	John Conyers	152,432	89%	Edward Mack	17,393	10%	Andrew Pulley	Socialist Workers	685	0%								
1986	John Conyers	94,307	89%	Bill Ashe	10,407	10%	Peter Bowen	Independent	539	1%	Andrew Pulley	Independent	529	1%				
1988	John Conyers	127,800	91%	Bill Ashe	10,979	8%	Jonathan Flint	Libertarian	744	1%	Sam Johnson	Workers Against Concessions	615	0%				
1990	John Conyers	76,556	89%	Ray Shoulders	7,298	9%	Robert Mays	NPA	1,134	1%	Jonathan Flint	Libertarian	764	1%				

Michigan's 14th congressional district: Results 1992–2010
Year	Democrat	Votes	%	Republican	Votes	%	Third Party	Party	Votes	%	Third Party	Party	Votes	%	Third Party	Party	Votes	%
1992	John Conyers	165,496	82%	John Gordon	32,036	16%	Richard Miller	Natural Law	2,043	1%	D'Artagnan Collier	Workers League	1,296	1%				
1994	John Conyers	128,463	81%	Richard Fournier	26,215	17%	Richard Miller	Natural Law	2,953	2%								
1996	John Conyers	157,722	85%	William Ashe	22,152	12%	Scott Boman	Libertarian	2,953	2%	Richard Miller	Natural Law	736	0%	Willie Reid	NPA	717	0%
1998	John Conyers	126,321	87%	Vendella Collins	16,140	11%	Michael Freyman	Libertarian	1,764	1%	Richard Miller	Natural Law	1,080	1%				
2000	John Conyers	168,982	89%	William Ashe	17,582	9%	Constance Catalfio	Libertarian	2,113	1%	Richard Miller	Natural Law	1,030	1%				
2002	John Conyers	145,285	83%	Dave Stone	26,544	15%	Francis Schorr	Libertarian	1,532	1%	John Litle	Green	1,247	1%				
2004	John Conyers	213,681	84%	Veronica Pedraza	35,089	14%	Michael Donahue	Libertarian	2,278	1%	Lisa Weltman	Green	2,224	1%	Wilbert Sears	U.S. Taxpayers	1,307	1%
2006	John Conyers	158,755	85%	Chad Miles	27,367	15%												
2008	John Conyers	227,841	92%	No candidate			Richard Secula	Libertarian	10,732	4%	Clyde Shabazz	Green	8,015	3%				
2010	John Conyers	115,511	77%	Don Ukrainec	29,902	20%	Marc Sosnowski	U.S. Taxpayers	3,206	2%	Richard Secula	Libertarian	1,859	1%				

Michigan's 13th congressional district: Results 2012–2016
Year	Democrat	Votes	%	Republican	Votes	%	Third Party	Party	Votes	%	Third Party	Party	Votes	%
2012	John Conyers	235,336	83%	Harry Sawicki	38,769	14%	Chris Sharer	Libertarian	6,076	2%	Martin Gray	U.S. Taxpayers	4,089	1%
2014	John Conyers	132,710	79%	Jeff Gorman	27,234	16%	Chris Sharer	Libertarian	3,537	2%	Sam Johnson	NPA	3,466	2%
2016	John Conyers	198,771	77%	Jeff Gorman	40,541	15%	Tiffany Hayden	Libertarian	9,648	3%	Sam Johnson	Working Class	8,835	3%
