= Electoral history of John Dingell =

List of elections featuring John Dingell as a candidate

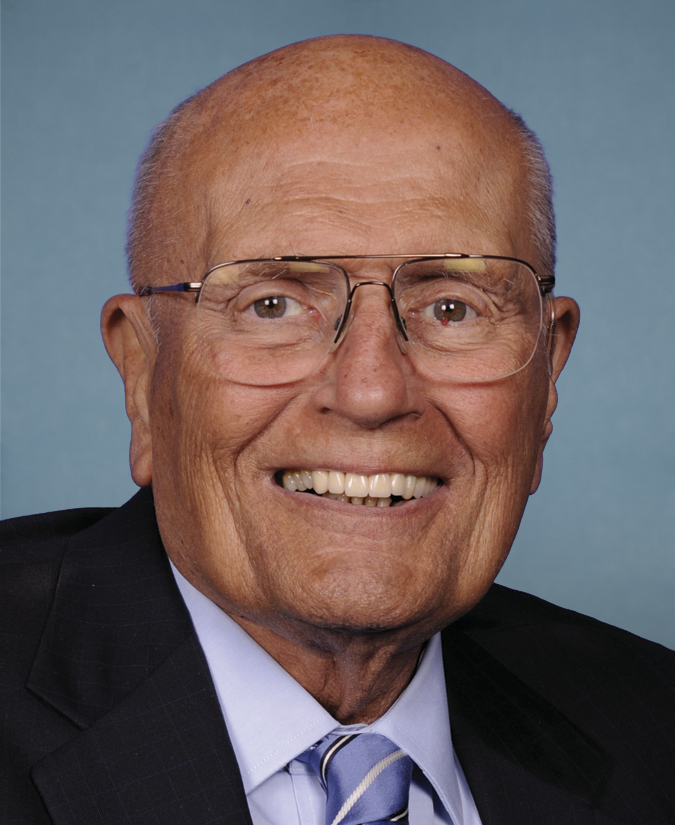
Representative John Dingell during the 112th United States Congress

This is the electoral history of John Dingell, a former Democratic Representative from Detroit who represented the 15th, 16th, and 12th districts. Dingell was first elected in a 1955 special election to replace his late father, John Dingell Sr. and was re-elected in every subsequent election until his retirement in 2014 where he was succeeded by his wife, Debbie Dingell. He was the longest serving member of the United States House of Representatives, and the United States Congress overall.

== Almanac ==
United States Congressional service
| Dates | Congress | Chamber | Majority | President | District |
|---|---|---|---|---|---|
| 1955-57 | 84th | U.S. House | Democratic | Dwight D. Eisenhower | District 15 |
| 1957-59 | 85th | U.S. House | Democratic | Dwight D. Eisenhower | District 15 |
| 1959-61 | 86th | U.S. House | Democratic | Dwight D. Eisenhower | District 15 |
| 1961-63 | 87th | U.S. House | Democratic | John F. Kennedy | District 15 |
| 1963-65 | 88th | U.S. House | Democratic | John F. Kennedy | District 15 |
| 1963-65 | 88th | U.S. House | Democratic | Lyndon B. Johnson | District 15 |
| 1965-67 | 89th | U.S. House | Democratic | Lyndon B. Johnson | District 16 |
| 1967-69 | 90th | U.S. House | Democratic | Lyndon B. Johnson | District 16 |
| 1969-71 | 91st | U.S. House | Democratic | Richard Nixon | District 16 |
| 1971-73 | 92nd | U.S. House | Democratic | Richard Nixon | District 16 |
| 1973-75 | 93rd | U.S. House | Democratic | Richard Nixon | District 16 |
| 1973-75 | 93rd | U.S. House | Democratic | Gerald Ford | District 16 |
| 1975-77 | 94th | U.S. House | Democratic | Gerald Ford | District 16 |
| 1977-79 | 95th | U.S. House | Democratic | Jimmy Carter | District 16 |
| 1979-81 | 96th | U.S. House | Democratic | Jimmy Carter | District 16 |
| 1981-83 | 97th | U.S. House | Democratic | Ronald Reagan | District 16 |
| 1983-85 | 98th | U.S. House | Democratic | Ronald Reagan | District 16 |
| 1985-87 | 99th | U.S. House | Democratic | Ronald Reagan | District 16 |
| 1987-89 | 100th | U.S. House | Democratic | Ronald Reagan | District 16 |
| 1989-91 | 101st | U.S. House | Democratic | George H. W. Bush | District 16 |
| 1991-93 | 102nd | U.S. House | Democratic | George H. W. Bush | District 16 |
| 1993-95 | 103rd | U.S. House | Democratic | Bill Clinton | District 16 |
| 1995-97 | 104th | U.S. House | Republican | Bill Clinton | District 16 |
| 1997-99 | 105th | U.S. House | Republican | Bill Clinton | District 16 |
| 1999-2001 | 106th | U.S. House | Republican | Bill Clinton | District 16 |
| 2001-03 | 107th | U.S. House | Republican | George W. Bush | District 16 |
| 2003-05 | 108th | U.S. House | Republican | George W. Bush | District 15 |
| 2005-07 | 109th | U.S. House | Republican | George W. Bush | District 15 |
| 2007-09 | 110th | U.S. House | Democratic | George W. Bush | District 15 |
| 2009-11 | 111th | U.S. House | Democratic | Barack Obama | District 15 |
| 2011-13 | 112th | U.S. House | Republican | Barack Obama | District 12 |
| 2013-15 | 113th | U.S. House | Republican | Barack Obama | District 12 |

== Election results ==
Michigan's 15th congressional district: Results 1956–1962
| Year | Democrat | Votes | % | Republican | Votes | % | Third Party | Party | Votes | % | Third Party | Party | Votes | % |
|---|---|---|---|---|---|---|---|---|---|---|---|---|---|---|
| 1956 | John Dingell | 111,827 | 77% | Larry Middleton | 33,973 | 23% | Roxann Higgs | Prohibition | 206 | 0% | | | | |
| 1958 | John Dingell | 79,216 | 78% | Austin Curtis | 21,414 | 21% | Charles Aranoff | Socialist Labor | 199 | 0% | Estelle Tripp | Prohibition | 98 | 0% |
| 1960 | John Dingell | 111,671 | 79% | Robert Robbins | 28,532 | 20% | Hiram Coffman | Prohibition | 207 | 0% | Joseph Koss | Socialist Labor | 114 | 0% |
| 1962 | John Dingell | 94,197 | 83% | Ernest Richard | 19,258 | 17% | | | | | | | | |

Michigan's 16th congressional district: Results 1964–2000
| Year | Democrat | Votes | % | Republican | Votes | % | Third Party | Party | Votes | % | Third Party | Party | Votes | % | Third Party | Party | Votes | % |
|---|---|---|---|---|---|---|---|---|---|---|---|---|---|---|---|---|---|---|
| 1964 | John Dingell | 112,763 | 73% | Monte Bona | 40,673 | 26% | Henry Austin | Socialist Workers | 189 | 0% | | | | | | | | |
| 1966 | John Dingell | 71,787 | 63% | John Dempsey | 42,738 | 37% | | | | | | | | | | | | |
| 1968 | John Dingell | 105,690 | 74% | Monte Bona | 37,000 | 26% | Henry Austin | Socialist Workers | 369 | 0% | | | | | | | | |
| 1970 | John Dingell | 90,540 | 79% | William Rostrom | 23,867 | 21% | | | | | | | | | | | | |
| 1972 | John Dingell | 110,715 | 68% | William Rostrom | 48,414 | 30% | Peter Gayner | American Independent | 3,554 | 2% | | | | | | | | |
| 1974 | John Dingell | 95,834 | 78% | Wallace English | 25,248 | 20% | Virginia Crawford | American Independent | 1,605 | 1% | Donald Bechler | Socialist Workers | 365 | 0% | Lewis Steinhardt | U.S. Labor | 232 | 0% |
| 1976 | John Dingell | 121,682 | 76% | William Rostron | 36,378 | 23% | Buck Slayter | American Independent | 1,009 | 1% | Samuel Hancock | Libertarian | 484 | 0% | Susan Dalto | U.S. Labor | 463 | 0% |
| 1978 | John Dingell | 93,387 | 70% | Melvin Heuer | 26,827 | 22% | Harry Hengy | American Independent | 1,889 | 2% | | | | | | | | |
| 1980 | John Dingell | 105,844 | 70% | Pamella Seay | 42,735 | 28% | R. Scott Davidson | Libertarian | 1,810 | 1% | Ronald Slote | American Independent | 1,069 | 1% | | | | |
| 1982 | John Dingell | 114,006 | 74% | David Haskins | 39,227 | 25% | Susan Apstein | Socialist Workers | 1,071 | 1% | Paul Scherrer | Workers League | 450 | 0% | | | | |
| 1984 | John Dingell | 121,463 | 64% | Frank Grzywacki | 68,116 | 36% | Donald Kostyu | Libertarian | 1,042 | 1% | | | | | | | | |
| 1986 | John Dingell | 101,659 | 78% | Frank Grzywacki | 28,971 | 22% | | | | | | | | | | | | |
| 1988 | John Dingell | 132,775 | 97% | No candidate | | | Russell Leone | Workers Against Concessions | 3,561 | 3% | | | | | | | | |
| 1990 | John Dingell | 88,962 | 67% | William Morse | 42,469 | 32% | Roger Pope | Libertarian | 2,019 | 2% | | | | | | | | |
| 1992 | John Dingell | 156,964 | 65% | Frank Beaumont | 75,694 | 31% | Max Siegle | Tisch Independent Citizens | 4,048 | 2% | Jeff Hampton | Libertarian | 1,842 | 1% | Martin McLaughlin | Workers League | 1,842 | 1% |
| 1994 | John Dingell | 105,846 | 59% | Ken Larkin | 71,159 | 40% | Noha Hamze | Natural Law | 1,968 | 1% | | | | | | | | |
| 1996 | John Dingell | 136,854 | 62% | James Desana | 78,723 | 36% | Bruce Cain | Libertarian | 3,155 | 1% | Noha Hamze | Natural Law | 1,018 | 0% | David Sole | Workers World | 842 | 0% |
| 1998 | John Dingell | 116,145 | 67% | William Morse | 54,121 | 31% | Edward Hlavac | Libertarian | 3,064 | 2% | Noha Hamze | Natural Law | 1,027 | 1% | | | | |
| 2000 | John Dingell | 167,142 | 71% | William Morse | 62,469 | 27% | Edward Hlavac | Libertarian | 2,814 | 1% | Ken Larkin | U.S. Taxpayers | 2,154 | 1% | Noha Hamze | Natural Law | 938 | 0% |

Michigan's 15th congressional district: Results 2002–2010
| Year | Democrat | Votes | % | Republican | Votes | % | Third Party | Party | Votes | % | Third Party | Party | Votes | % | Third Party | Party | Votes | % |
|---|---|---|---|---|---|---|---|---|---|---|---|---|---|---|---|---|---|---|
| 2002 | John Dingell | 136,518 | 72% | Martin Kaltenbach | 48,626 | 26% | Gregory Stempfle | Libertarian | 3,919 | 2% | | | | | | | | |
| 2004 | John Dingell | 218,409 | 71% | Dawn Reamer | 81,828 | 27% | Gregory Stempfle | Libertarian | 3,400 | 1% | Mike Eller | U.S. Taxpayers | 2,508 | 1% | Jerome White | NPA | 1,818 | 1% |
| 2006 | John Dingell | 181,946 | 88% | No candidate | | | Aimee Smith | Green | 9,447 | 5% | Gregory Stempfle | Libertarian | 8,410 | 4% | Robert Czak | U.S. Taxpayers | 7,064 | 3% |
| 2008 | John Dingell | 231,784 | 71% | John Lynch | 81,802 | 25% | Aimee Smith | Green | 7,082 | 2% | Gregory Stempfle | Libertarian | 4,002 | 1% | James Wagner | U.S. Taxpayers | 3,157 | 1% |
| 2010 | John Dingell | 116,293 | 57% | Rob Steele | 71,108 | 40% | Aimee Smith | Green | 2,686 | 1% | Kerry Morgan | Libertarian | 1,969 | 1% | Matthew Furman | U.S. Taxpayers | 1,821 | 1% |

Michigan's 12th congressional district: 2012 Results
| Year | Democrat | Votes | % | Republican | Votes | % | Third Party | Party | Votes | % |
|---|---|---|---|---|---|---|---|---|---|---|
| 2012 | John Dingell | 216,884 | 68% | Cynthia Kallgren | 92,472 | 29% | Richard Secula | Libertarian | 9,867 | 3% |
