= Auction Network =

Auction Network is a 24-hour Internet and cable television channel that offers virtual bidding services in live auctions of items. When it was released in 2007, items included automobiles, collectibles, million dollar thoroughbreds, art, wine collections, and sports and celebrity memorabilia, among other things. A portion of proceeds were occasionally being donated to charity.

== History ==
The network launched October 28, 2007 as an Internet television network with streaming video, interactive bidding capability, Video On Demand and gaming content. The cable and satellite television platforms was launched in 2008.
