= Electoral history of Gary Peters =

Elections featuring American politician

This is the electoral history of Gary Peters. Peters is a member of the Democratic Party and was elected to the United States Senate in November 2014 after serving three terms in the United States House of Representatives. He is a former member of the Michigan Senate, a former Michigan Lottery Commissioner and was the Democratic Nominee for Michigan Attorney General in 2002.

1998 General Election - Michigan's 14th State Senate District
Party	Candidate	Votes	%	±%
Democratic	Gary Peters (incumbent)	53,497	65.5%	N/A
Republican	Mike Christie Jr.	28,201	34.5%	N/A

2002 General Election - Michigan Attorney General
Party	Candidate	Votes	%	±%
Republican	Mike Cox	1,499,066	48.9%	+1.0%
Democratic	Gary Peters	1,493,866	48.7%	−3.4%
Green	Jerry Kaufman	47,894	1.6%	N/A
Constitution	Gerald Van Sickle	27,186	0.9%	N/A
Republican gain from Democratic		Swing		

2008 General Election - Michigan's 9th Congressional District
Party	Candidate	Votes	%	±%
Democratic	Gary Peters	183,311	52.1%	+5.9%
Republican	Joe Knollenberg (incumbent)	150,035	42.6%	−9.0%
Independent	Jack Kevorkian	8,987	2.6%	N/A
Libertarian	Adam Goodman	4,893	1.4%	−0.1%
Green	Douglas Campbell	4737	1.3%	+0.4%
Democratic gain from Republican		Swing		

2010 General Election - Michigan's 9th Congressional District
Party	Candidate	Votes	%	±%
Democratic	Gary Peters (incumbent)	125,730	49.8%	−2.3%
Republican	Rocky Raczkowski	119,325	47.2%	+4.6%
Libertarian	Adam Goodman	2,601	1.0%	+0.4%
Green	Douglas Campbell	2,484	1.0%	+0.3%
Independent	Bob Gray	1,866	0.7%	N/A
Independent	Matthew Kuofie	644	0.3%	N/A

2012 Democratic Primary - Michigan's 14th Congressional District
Party	Candidate	Votes	%	±%
Democratic	Gary Peters (incumbent)	41,233	47.0%	N/A
Democratic	Hansen Clarke	30,848	35.2%	N/A
Democratic	Brenda L. Lawrence	11,650	13.3%	N/A
Democratic	Mary Waters	2,920	3.3%	N/A
Democratic	Bob Costello	1,027	1.2%	N/A

2012 General Election - Michigan's 14th Congressional District
Party	Candidate	Votes	%	±%
Democratic	Gary Peters	270,450	82.3%	+5.5%
Republican	John Hauler	51,395	15.6%	−3.6%
Libertarian	Leonard Schwartz	3,968	1.2%	0%
Green	Douglas Campbell	2,979	0.9%	N/A

United States Senate election in Michigan, 2014
Party	Candidate	Votes	%	±%
Democratic	Gary Peters	1,704,936	54.6%	−8.1%
Republican	Terri Lynn Land	1,290,199	41.3%	+7.5%
Libertarian	Jim Fulner	62,897	2.0%	+0.4%
Green	Chris Wahmhoff	26,137	0.9%	0%
U.S. Taxpayers	Richard Matkin	37,529	1.2%	+.6%
	Write-Ins	77	0.0%	0%
Majority		414,737		
Turnout		3,121,775		
Democratic hold				

United States Senate election in Michigan, 2020
Party	Candidate	Votes	%	±%
Democratic	Gary Peters (incumbent)	2,734,568	49.90%	−4.71%
Republican	John James	2,642,233	48.22%	+6.89%
Constitution	Valerie Willis	50,597	0.92%	−0.28%
Green	Marcia Squier	39,217	0.72%	−0.12%
Natural Law	Doug Dern	13,093	0.24%	N/A
Write-in		12	0.00%	±0.00%
Majority		92,355	1.68%	−4.7%
Total votes		5,479,720	100.0%	
Democratic hold				
