= List of Michigan State Historic Sites in St. Joseph County =

Location of St. Joseph County in Michigan

The following is a list of Michigan State Historic Sites in St. Joseph County, Michigan. Sites marked with a dagger (†) are also listed on the National Register of Historic Places in St. Joseph County, Michigan.

== Current listings ==
Name	Image	Location	City	Listing date
General Harry Hill Bandholtz House		325 South Washington Street and Third Street	Constantine	September 25, 1956
Governor John S. Barry House†		280 North Washington Street	Constantine	September 25, 1956
Lyman Bishop House	Lyman Bishop House	1062 M-60	Leonidas	July 26, 1973
George Brissette-Charles Wheeler House		208 North Main Street	Three Rivers	May 15, 1987
Harvey Cady House		135 West Burr Oak Street	Centreville	July 26, 1973
Leverett and Amanda Clapp House†		324 West Main Street	Centreville	2009
Colon / Harry Blackstone Informational Designation		Corner of Blackstone and Main	Colon	April 15, 1977
Colon Public Library		128 South Blackstone Avenue	Colon	September 25, 1985
Colon Seminary - Lamb Knit Goods Company Building		Corner of Blackstone and Elm Street	Colon	July 20, 1984
Constantine Methodist Episcopal Church		285 White Pigeon Street	Constantine	September 24, 1984
Downtown Three Rivers Commercial Historic District†		North Main Street, Michigan and Portage avenues (Marker - 66 N. Main Street)	Three Rivers	May 8, 1986
Exchange Hotel		149 East Main Street	Centreville	February 19, 1987
Farrand Hall†		58522 Farrand Road	Colon vicinity	December 10, 1971
Fawn River District No. 3 Schoolhouse		31165 Fawn River Road (County Road 132)	Fawn River	January 8, 1981
First Presbyterian Church		107 East Chicago Road	White Pigeon	October 2, 1980
First Protestant Reformed Dutch Church of Centreville		235 South Dean Street	Centreville	June 23, 1983
Flowerfield Mills (Extant burned)		Northwest corner of Main and Mill streets on Flowerfield Creek	Flowerfield	November 3, 1976
Richard Fulcher House		322 East Street	Three Rivers	November 26, 1985
Samuel Gorton House	Samuel Gorton House	31465 Colon Road (County Road 124)	Colon	July 26, 1973
William Heywood House		180 East Third Street	Constantine	June 23, 1983
Klinger's Mill and Mill Pond		11152 River Road	Constantine	March 5, 1998
Lakeside District No. 2 School		Northwest corner of Arthur L. Jones and South Corey Lake roads	Fabius	September 10, 1979
Langley Covered Bridge		3 miles north of Centreville on Covered Bridge Road	Centreville	August 31, 1965
Marantette Bridge†		Buckner Road and Railroad Street at St. Joseph River	Mendon	November 16, 1989
Patrick Marantette House†	Patrick Marantette House	25538 Simpson Road	Mendon vicinity	December 10, 1971
Mendon Township Library		314 West Main Street	Mendon	October 2, 1980
Messiah Lutheran Church		185 West Fifth Street	Constantine	February 21, 1991
Morse-Scoville House†		685 Washington	Constantine	April 18, 1996
Mottville Bridge†		Old US-12 across the St. Joseph River	Mottville	April 10, 1986
New York Central Railroad Depot		101 S. Jefferson	Sturgis	June 18, 1976
Nottawa District No. 3 Schoolhouse†		East of Nottawa at the junction of Sturgis and Filmore Roads (M-86)	Nottawa vicinity	August 13, 1971
George Palmer-Dr. Oscar Young House		285 South Washington	Constantine	February 25, 1988
St. Joseph County Courthouse†		125 West Main Street	Centreville	March 20, 1984
Arthur Silliman House†		116 South Main Street	Three Rivers	May 14, 1975
Stewart House	Daniel and Alexander Stewart House	M-86 and Holtom Road	Centreville	July 26, 1973
Sturges-Jones Auditorium		201 N. Nottawa St.	Sturgis	March 26, 2006
Judge John Sturgis House		26415 West Chicago Rd.	Sturgis	July 26, 1973
Three Rivers Informational Designation		Scidmore Park on M-60 (West Michigan Avenue)	Three Rivers	April 30, 1957
Three Rivers Public Library		107 North Main Street	Three Rivers	November 16, 1982
White Pigeon General Land Office†		113 West Chicago Road (US-12)	White Pigeon	December 19, 1984
Albert G. Wade Estate		301 West Chicago Road (US-12)	White Pigeon	April 24, 1981
Chief Wahbememe Burial Site†		Northwest corner of US-12 and US-131	White Pigeon	May 17, 1988
Wells-Bryan House		260 South Washington Street	Constantine	December 8, 1977
White Pigeon		White Pigeon Village	White Pigeon	September 17, 1957
Zion Evangelical Church / West Mendon United Methodist Church		Portage Lake Road at Lakehead Drive	Mendon	January 25, 1985

== See also ==
- National Register of Historic Places listings in St. Joseph County, Michigan

== Sources ==
- Historic Sites Online – "St. Joseph" County. Michigan State Housing Developmental Authority. Accessed June 1, 2011.
- Historic Sites Online – "Saint Joseph" County. Michigan State Housing Developmental Authority. Accessed June 1, 2011.
