= National Register of Historic Places listings in St. Joseph County, Michigan =

Location of St. Joseph County in Michigan

This is a list of the National Register of Historic Places listings in St. Joseph County, Michigan.

This is intended to be a complete list of the properties and districts on the National Register of Historic Places in St. Joseph County, Michigan, United States. Latitude and longitude coordinates are provided for many National Register properties and districts; these locations may be seen together in a map.

There are 16 properties and districts listed on the National Register in the county.

This National Park Service list is complete through NPS recent listings posted January 9, 2026.

== Current listings ==
	Name on the Register	Image	Date listed	Location	City or town	Description
1	Art Gallery Building	Art Gallery Building	May 9, 1980 (#80004070)	156 S. Washington St. 41°50′29″N 85°40′08″W	Constantine	
2	Gov. John S. Barry House	Gov. John S. Barry House	March 16, 1972 (#72001308)	280 N. Washington St. 41°50′44″N 85°40′19″W	Constantine	
3	Leverett A. and Amanda (Hampson) Clapp House	Leverett A. and Amanda (Hampson) Clapp House	July 1, 2009 (#09000476)	324 W. Main St. 41°55′26″N 85°31′50″W	Centreville	
4	Constantine Historic Commercial District	Constantine Historic Commercial District	September 17, 1985 (#85002444)	Washington St. between 2nd and Water, and Water St. between White Pigeon and 125 W. Water; 41°50′31″N 85°40′08″W	Constantine	
5	Downtown Three Rivers Commercial Historic District	Downtown Three Rivers Commercial Historic District	April 29, 1982 (#82004472)	N. Main St., Michigan and Portage Aves. 41°56′42″N 85°38′01″W	Three Rivers	
6	Farrand Hall	Farrand Hall	August 25, 1972 (#72001307)	451 Farrand Rd. 41°56′54″N 85°20′33″W	Colon	
7	Marantette Bridge	Marantette Bridge	June 25, 2001 (#01000708)	Railroad St., Buckner Rd. over the St. Joseph River; 41°59′56″N 85°27′30″W	Mendon	
8	Marantette House	Marantette House	April 11, 1973 (#73001947)	25538 Simpson Rd. 42°00′00″N 85°27′19″W	Mendon	
9	Morse–Scoville House	Morse–Scoville House	July 25, 1996 (#96000801)	685 S. Washington; 41°50′13″N 85°39′53″W	Constantine	
10	Nettleton-Cond House	Nettleton-Cond House	July 26, 2021 (#100006782)	260 South Washington St. 41°50′26″N 85°40′05″W	Constantine	
11	Nottawa Stone School	Nottawa Stone School	January 13, 1972 (#72001309)	East of Nottawa at the junction of Sturgis and Filmore Rds. 41°55′10″N 85°26′25″W	Nottawa	
12	Arthur Silliman House	Arthur Silliman House	November 20, 1979 (#79002662)	116 S. Main St. 41°56′37″N 85°37′55″W	Three Rivers	
13	St. Joseph County Courthouse	St. Joseph County Courthouse	September 16, 1993 (#93000984)	125 W. Main St. 41°55′22″N 85°31′41″W	Centreville	
14	US 12 St. Joseph River Bridge	US 12 St. Joseph River Bridge	April 5, 1991 (#91000388)	U. S. Route 12 over the St. Joseph River, Mottville Township; 41°48′00″N 85°45′25″W	Mottville	
15	Old US Government Land Office Building	Old US Government Land Office Building	February 7, 1989 (#88003234)	113 W. Chicago Rd. 41°47′52″N 85°38′38″W	White Pigeon	
16	Wahbememe Burial Site and Monument	Wahbememe Burial Site and Monument	July 21, 1995 (#95000867)	Junction of U.S. Routes 12 and 131, Mottville Township; 41°47′51″N 85°39′47″W	White Pigeon	

== Listings Formerly Located in St. Joseph County ==
The following listings were located in St. Joseph County at the time they were placed on the Register, but have since moved to other locations.

	Name on the Register	Image	Date listed	Current Location	Location when Listed	Description
1	M-86–Prairie River Bridge	M-86–Prairie River Bridge	February 4, 2000 (#00000044)	Crystal Springs Street over the Dowagiac River, Pokagon Township, Michigan; 41°55′31″N 86°12′22″W	M-86 over the Prairie River 41°55'08"N 85°28'54"W	This camelback truss bridge, constructed in 1923, was originally located on Telegraph Road over the Rouge River. It was moved to the M-86 location in St. Joseph County in 1938/39 and was in place for nearly 80 years. In 2016/2017, it was moved again, 50 miles away to Crystal Springs Street over the Dowagiac River in Cass County.

== See also ==
- List of Michigan State Historic Sites in St. Joseph County, Michigan
- List of National Historic Landmarks in Michigan
- National Register of Historic Places listings in Michigan
- Listings in neighboring counties: Branch, Calhoun, Cass, Elkhart (IN), Kalamazoo, LaGrange (IN), Van Buren
