= Nottawa Stone School =

- U.S. National Register of Historic Places
- Michigan State Historic Site
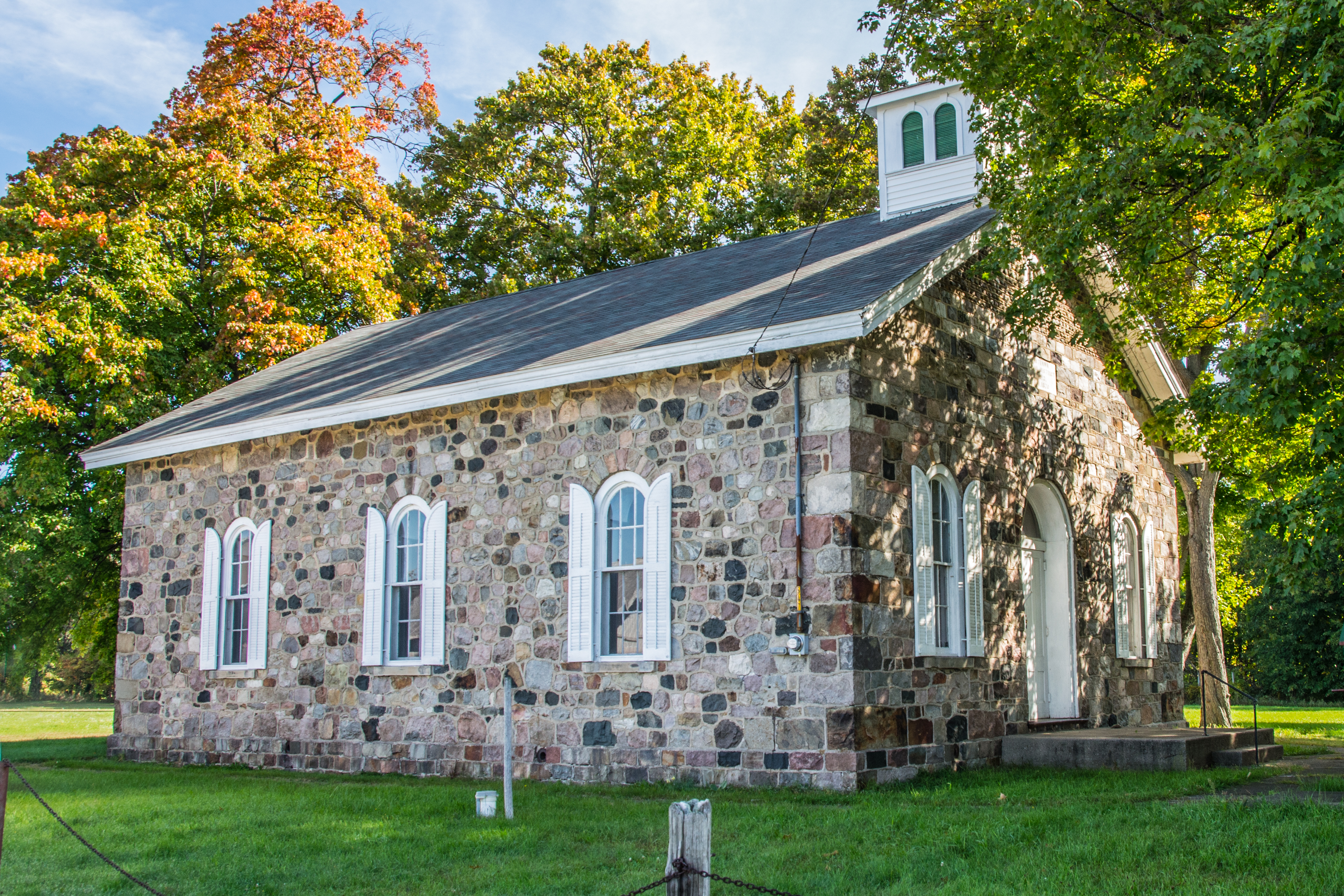

- Location within Michigan Location within the United States
- Interactive map
- Location: 26456 M-86, Nottawa, Michigan
- Coordinates: 41.91931°N 85.43969°W
- Area: 1 acre (0.40 ha)
- Built: 1870
- NRHP reference No.: 72001309
- Added to NRHP: January 13, 1972

The Nottawa Stone School is a schoolhouse located at 26456 M-86 (at Filmore Road) near Nottawa, Michigan. It was listed on the National Register of Historic Places in 1972.

== History ==
In 1870, the previous frame structure serving the local Nottawa school district was deemed too dilapidated to continue service. The director of the district at the time was John W. Schermerhorn; it is believed that Schermerhorn designed the school building after the school he attended as a boy in Schenectady, New York. The school was completed in 1870 for a cost of about $3000. Although originally designed to seat 150 pupils, it probably served around 50 when it first opened. Larger desks were soon installed, reducing the capacity to about 70 students. In the lat 1880s, a second room was added, bringing the total capacity up to about 130 students.

The school remained in use until the late 1950s. In 1967, the Kalamazoo Valley Intermediate School System (now the St. Joseph County Intermediate School District) refurbished the school to allow school classes to use the building for a day to re-enact how school was held in the 1870s. As of 2017, this program is still operating.

== Description ==
The Nottawa Stone School is a single-story building containing two sections connected together in an L-shape and a small rear addition. Both main sections were originally built to house a single classroom, and the addition to house restrooms and storage. The original section of the school is built from fieldstone and measures 48 feet by 34 feet. The second portion is built from brick and measures 35 feet by 22 feet. The stone section is gable-roofed and has rounded, arched door and windows.

On the interior of the original section, a c. 1870 rural school is set up. It contains slate blackboards, a raised platform for the teacher, wainscoting on the walls, and an oiled wood floor. The later brick portion contains a country store display.

== See also ==
- National Register of Historic Places listings in St. Joseph County, Michigan
