= M86 =

M86 or M-86 may refer to:

== Ships ==
- HMAS Diamantina (M 86), a Huon-class minehunter in the Royal Australian Navy
- INS Malpe (M86), an Indian Naval minesweeper ship

== Transportation ==
- M86 (Johannesburg), a short metropolitan route in South Africa
- M86 (New York City bus), a bus route in Manhattan, U.S.
- M86 expressway (Hungary)
- M-86 (Michigan highway), U.S.
- M-86-Prairie River Bridge, now the Crystal Springs Street–Dowagiac River Bridge, near Sumnerville, Michigan, U.S.

== Weapons and munitions ==
- M86 pursuit deterrent munition, a U.S. anti-personnel landmine
- M86 sniper rifle, a 7.62mm sniper rifle employed by the U.S. military
- Valmet Sniper M86, a Finnish sniper rifle
- Zastava M86, a variant of the Zastava M84 machine gun

== Other uses ==
- M86 Security, an American Internet threat protection company
- M86 Swimming Center, Madrid, Spain
- Messier 86, or M86, a lenticular galaxy in the Virgo Cluster
- Tumansky M-86, a variant of the Gnome-Rhône Mistral Major aircraft engine
