= Nottawa Township, Michigan =

Nottawa Township is the name of some places in the U.S. state of Michigan:

- Nottawa Township, Isabella County, Michigan
- Nottawa Township, St. Joseph County, Michigan
