= Crystal Springs Street–Dowagiac River Bridge =

- M-86–Prairie River Bridge
- U.S. National Register of Historic Places
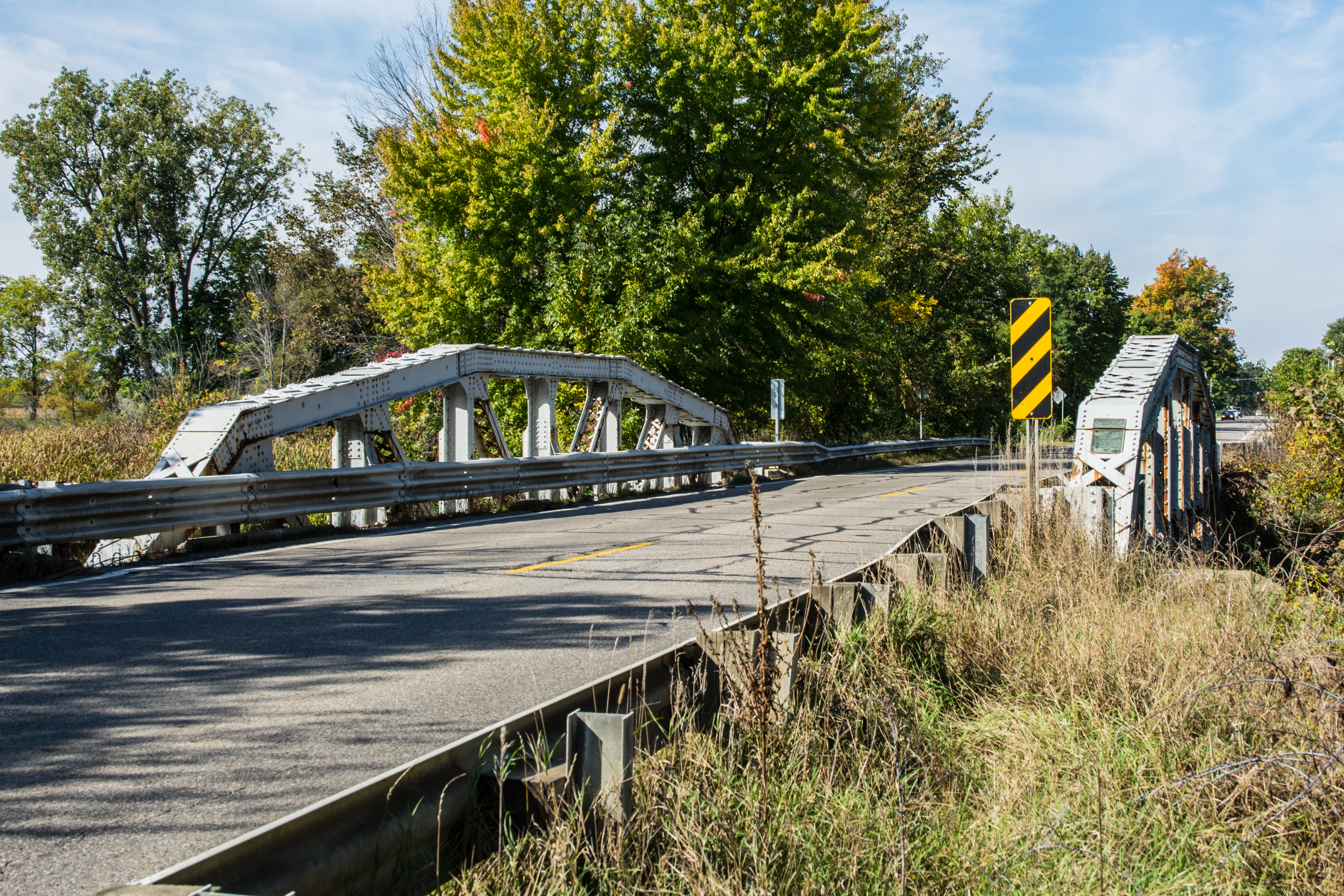
- Photo from 2014 from the M-86–Prairie River location

- Location within Michigan Location within the United States
- Interactive map
- Location: Crystal Springs Street over the Dowagiac River, Pokagon Township, Michigan
- Coordinates: 41°55′31″N 86°12′22″W
- Area: less than one acre
- Built: 1923
- Built by: Michigan State Highway Department
- Architect: Ira Lyons
- Architectural style: Camelback pony truss
- MPS: Highway Bridges of Michigan MPS
- NRHP reference No.: 00000044
- Added to NRHP: February 4, 2000

The Crystal Springs Street–Dowagiac River Bridge is a road bridge that carries Crystal Springs Street over the Dowagiac River near Sumnerville, Michigan. It was installed in that location in 2017. Between 1938 and 2016, the bridge was located approximately 50 miles away, and carried M-86 over the Prairie River near Nottawa, Michigan, and was known then as the M-86–Prairie River Bridge. The bridge was listed on the National Register of Historic Places in 2000, and is the last remaining camelback pony truss bridge used on the state trunkline system in Michigan.

== History ==
This bridge was designed by the Michigan State Highway Department in 1923, and was constructed by contractor Ira Lyons. It was originally located on Telegraph Road over the Rouge River. In 1938/39, the bridge was moved to span the Prairie River near Nottawa, and rebuilt as part of a Public Works Administration federal relief work project, replacing a pin-connected through-truss span bridge. Contractor L. W. Lamb oversaw the reconstruction. The bridge was rebuilt to the original plans, save for the elimination of two sidewalks which had been previously cantilevered outside the trusses.

In 2016, the Michigan Department of Transportation removed the bridge and replaced it with a wider structure. This bridge was restored and moved to Crystal Springs Street over the Dowagiac River in Pokagon Township, Cass County in 2017.

== Description ==
The bridge is a riveted steel eight-panel single span camelback pony truss bridge on a rural section of M-86. The bridge is 90 feet long, with a 32.8-foot-wide concrete deck and a 27 feet wide roadway. Five I-beams support the floor. The upper chord is constructed with back-to-back channels with lattice, while the lower chord and verticals are constructed from two pairs of angles with a plate in the middle. A metal guard rail serves as a railing. The bridge is supported with concrete abutments, and U-shaped concrete wing walls line the approach on each side.

== See also ==
- National Register of Historic Places listings in Cass County, Michigan
- National Register of Historic Places listings in St. Joseph County, Michigan
