= Governor John S. Barry House =

- Gov. John S. Barry House
- U.S. National Register of Historic Places
- Michigan State Historic Site
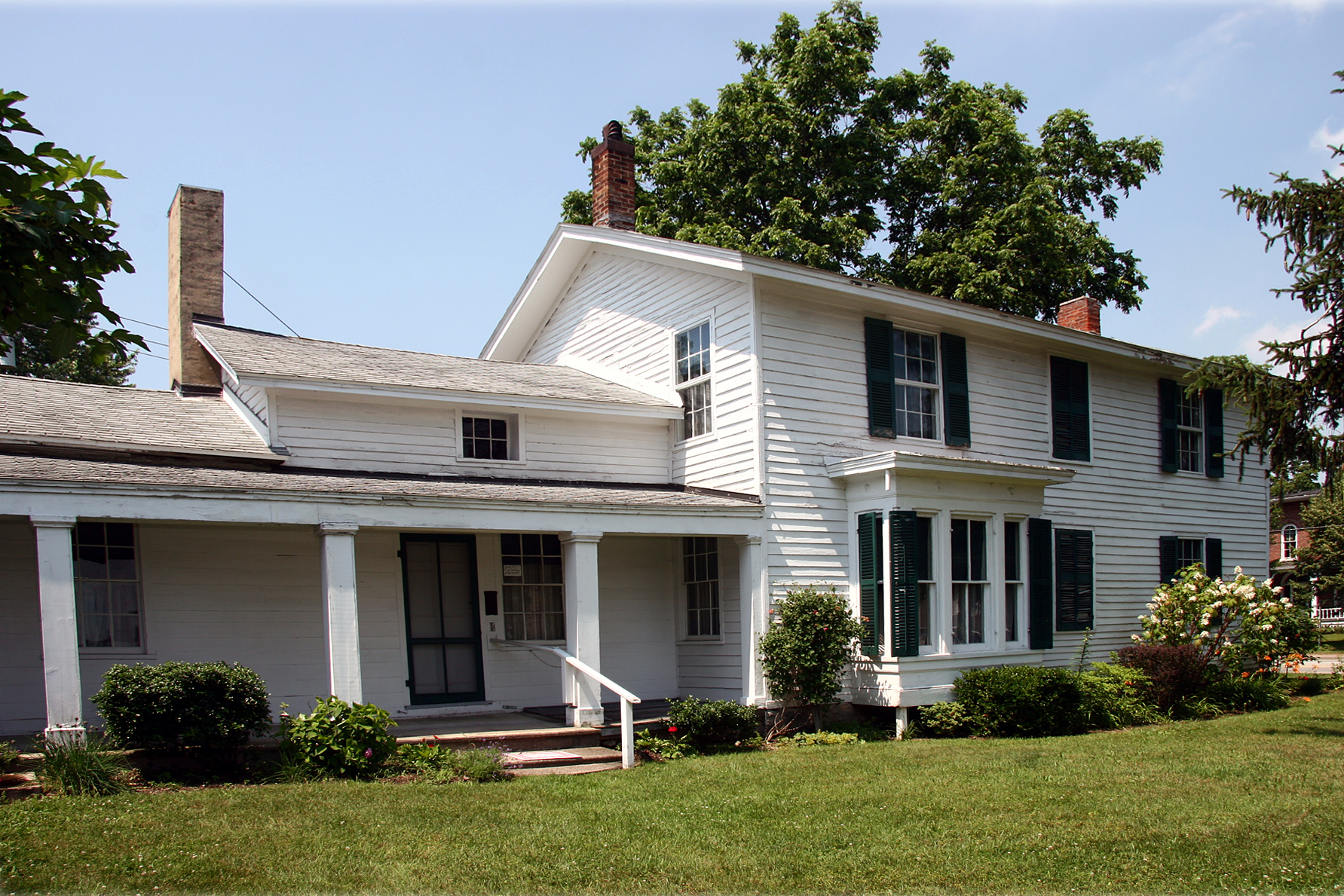

- Location within Michigan Location within the United States
- Interactive map
- Location: 280 N. Washington St., Constantine, Michigan
- Coordinates: 41°50′44″N 85°40′19″W
- Area: 1 acre (0.40 ha)
- Built: 1835
- NRHP reference No.: 72001308
- Added to NRHP: March 16, 1972

The Governor John S. Barry House is a private house located at 280 N. Washington Street in Constantine, Michigan. It was listed on the National Register of Historic Places in 1972. It currently houses the Governor John S. Barry Museum.

== History ==
John S. Barry was born and educated in New England in 1802. While there, he was a member of Vermont's governor's staff and a captain in the militia, as well as practicing law privately. In 1831, he moved to White Pigeon, Michigan; three years later he moved to Constantine. In 1835 he purchased this property and constructed a house on it. While living in Constantine, he served as a member of the Constitutional Convention in 1835, as a state senator in 1837, and as governor from 1841–44 and 1849-50. He retired from politics in 1852, and operated a large store. Barry sold this house in 1847.

The house passed through a number of owners, but by the mid-20th century was vacant and deteriorating. The Governor Barry Historical Society purchased the house in the late 1960s and transformed it into a museum. As of 2017, the building still houses the Governor John S. Barry Museum.

== Description ==
The Barry House is a two-story, white-painted wood frame structure with a solid stone foundation, measuring approximately 24 feet by 76 feet. The windows are double-hung six over six lights with green shutters. The entry door has sidelights and opens into a large hall. There are seven rooms on the first floor, including two large parlors, and five rooms on the second floor.

== See also ==
- National Register of Historic Places in St. Joseph County, Michigan
