= Constantine Public Schools =

School district in Michigan, United States

Address
- 1 Falcon Drive Constantine, St. Joseph County, Michigan, 49042; United States

District information
- Grades: Pre-Kindergarten-12
- Superintendent: Pat Breen
- Schools: 5
- Budget: $18,558,000 2022-2023 expenditures
- NCES District ID: 2610750

Students and staff
- Students: 1,247 (2024-2025)
- Teachers: 77.65 (on an FTE basis) (2024-2025)
- Staff: 145.76 FTE (2024-2025)
- Student–teacher ratio: 16.06 (2024-2025)

Other information
- Website: www.homeofthefalcons.org

Constantine Public Schools is a public school district in southwest Michigan. In St. Joseph County, it serves Constantine and parts of the townships of Constantine, Fabius, Florence, and Mottville. In Cass County, it serves parts of the townships of Mason, Newberg, and Porter.

== History ==
Constantine's first school began in 1830 in a crude cellar room with split logs for seats. A dedicated schoolhouse was erected in 1832, and subsequent schoolhouses replaced it over the years. The site of the current middle school has been used as a school since 1867, when a three-story brick school was built. The first high school class graduated in 1872.

The upper floor of the 1867 schoolhouse burned on April 8, 1894. The school was rebuilt but burned twice more, the last time in 1926. Its school bell is prominently displayed in the current high school.

On the same site, the Canaris Street School was built in 1927 as a K-12 building, and it became the high school after grade schools were built in Constantine. A section housing the auditorium, gymnasium and band room was built around 1957. Ultimately the district's middle school, it closed in summer 2005, when the middle school moved to the former high school.

The current Constantine High School opened for classes on January 3, 2005 and the previous high school, built in 1966, became the district's middle school. The construction of Riverside Elementary was funded by the same bond issue that built the 1966 high school.

== Schools ==
Schools in Constantine Public Schools district
School	Address	Notes
Constantine High School	1 Falcon Drive, Constantine	Grades 9–12. Built 2005.
Constantine Middle School	260 W 6th Street, Constantine	Grades 6–8. Built 1957, expanded 1966.
Riverside Elementary	600 W 6th Street, Constantine	Grades 3–5
Eastside Elementary	935 White Pigeon Road, Constantine	Grades PreK-2
Constantine Tech/Adult Education	300 Peachtree Street, Constantine	Alternative high school
