= Farrand Hall =

- U.S. National Register of Historic Places
- Michigan State Historic Site
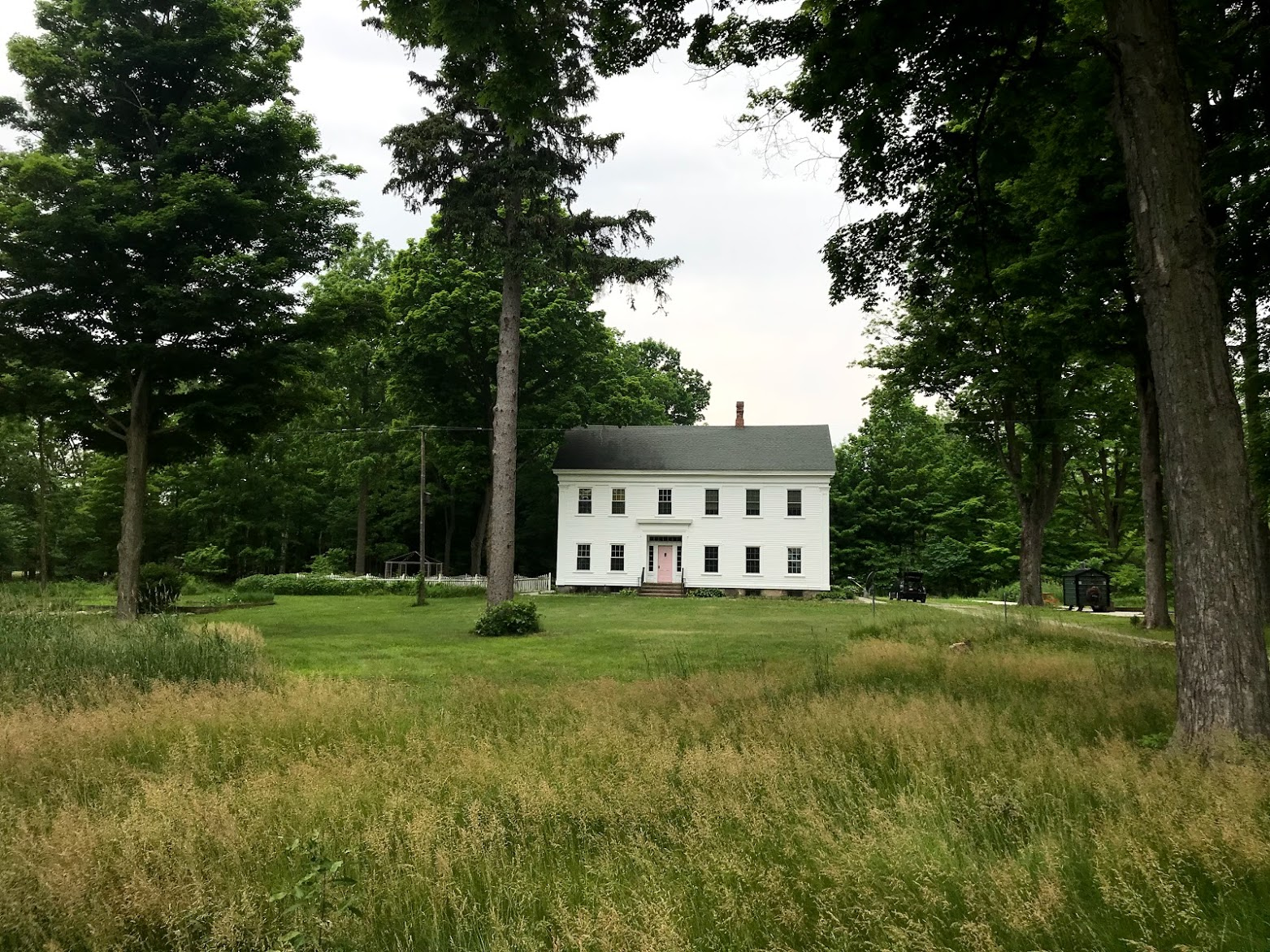

- Location within Michigan Location within the United States
- Interactive map
- Location: 451 Farrand Rd., Colon, Michigan
- Coordinates: 41°56′54″N 85°20′33″W
- Area: 1 acre (0.40 ha)
- Built: 1854
- Architectural style: Greek Revival
- NRHP reference No.: 72001307
- Added to NRHP: August 25, 1972

Farrand Hall is a private house located at 58522 Farrand Road in Colon, Michigan, United States. It was listed on the National Register of Historic Places in 1972.

== History ==
Henry K. Farrand moved from New York, to Colon Township in 1836 and settled on a 200-acre parcel at this location. He was accompanied by his aunt, Maria Farrand. Farrand settled in and began farming, and soon married and built a log house. He soon gained a reputation for raising livestock, and added another 600 acres to his farm.

In 1854, Farrand built this house for his family; it reportedly resembled his Aunt Maria's birthplace in Philadelphia. Farrand's wife died in 1855, leaving him with four young children. Farrand continued to live and farm here, and served as township supervisor from 1872 to 1883. He died in 1887. The farmland passed on to Farrand's descendants, who farmed the land until at least the early 1970s. Farrand Hall passed to Farrand's daughter Margaret. After her death in about 1930, the house was sold to Mr. and Mrs. Schultz of Chicago. In 1952 the house was sold to Blanche Price Burgess, Henry Farrand's great-granddaughter, who restored the house and lived in it until her death in 1965. The house was later sold to Robert La Valle.

== Description ==
Farrand Hall is a large two-story Greek Revival frame house with clapboard siding and a gable roof. Pilasters decorate the eaves and the corners of the house, and flank the front door. A single story addition is located at the rear. The windows have six over six lights, with slightly smaller windows in the rear, and eyebrow windows in the rear addition.

== Gallery ==
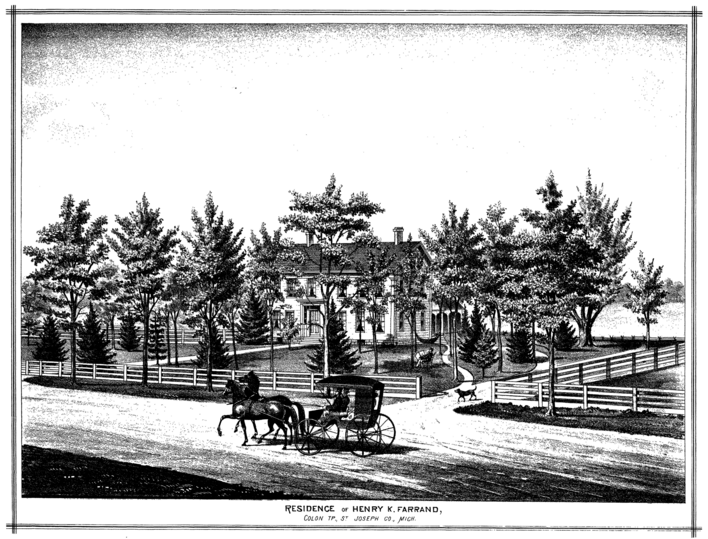
Farrand Hall, 1877

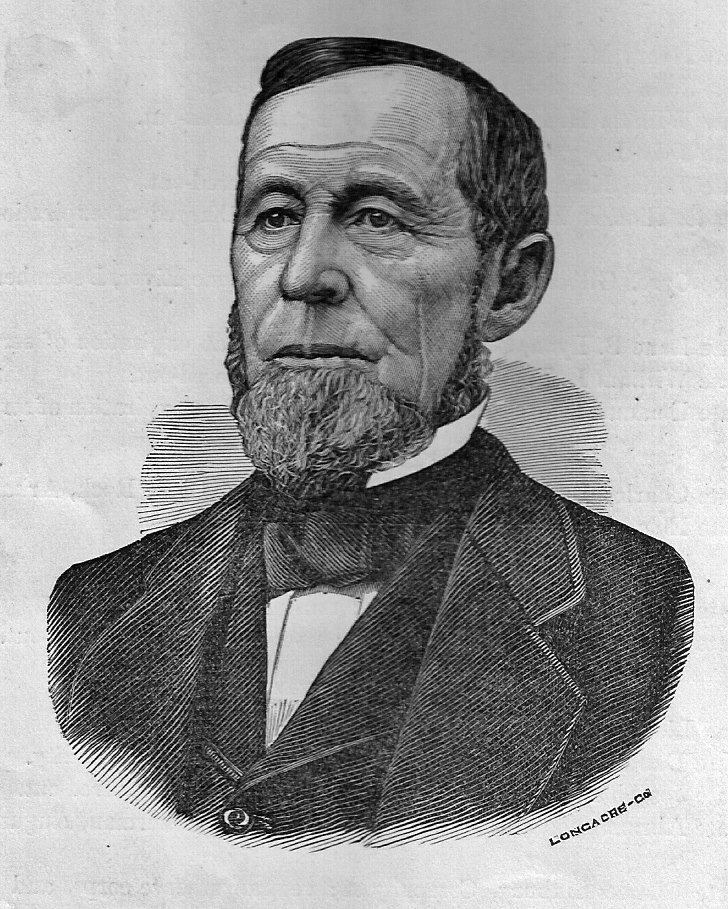
Henry K. Farrand

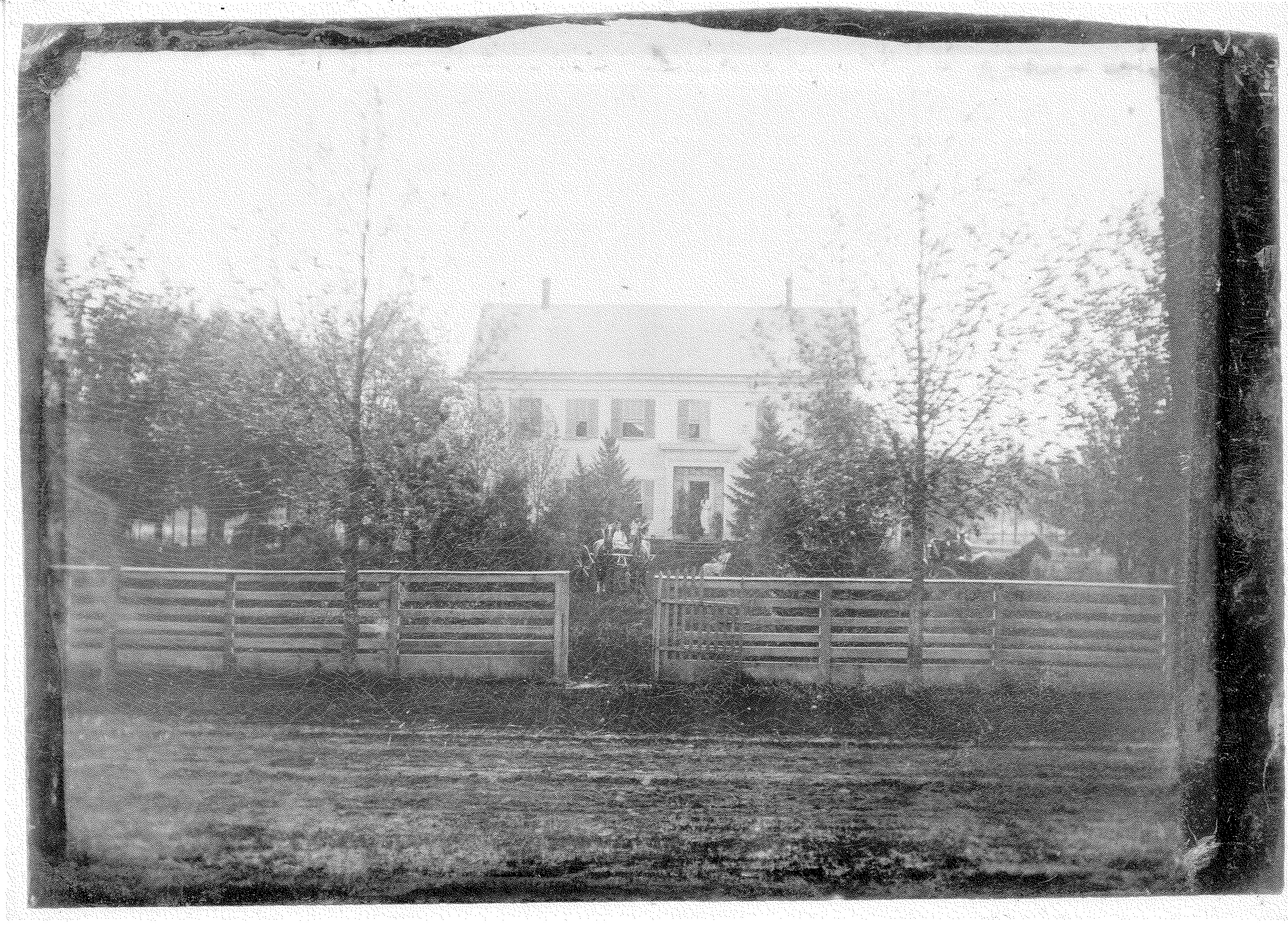

== See also ==
- National Register of Historic Places in St. Joseph County, Michigan
