= Nettleton-Cond House =

Historic house in Michigan, United States

- U.S. National Register of Historic Places
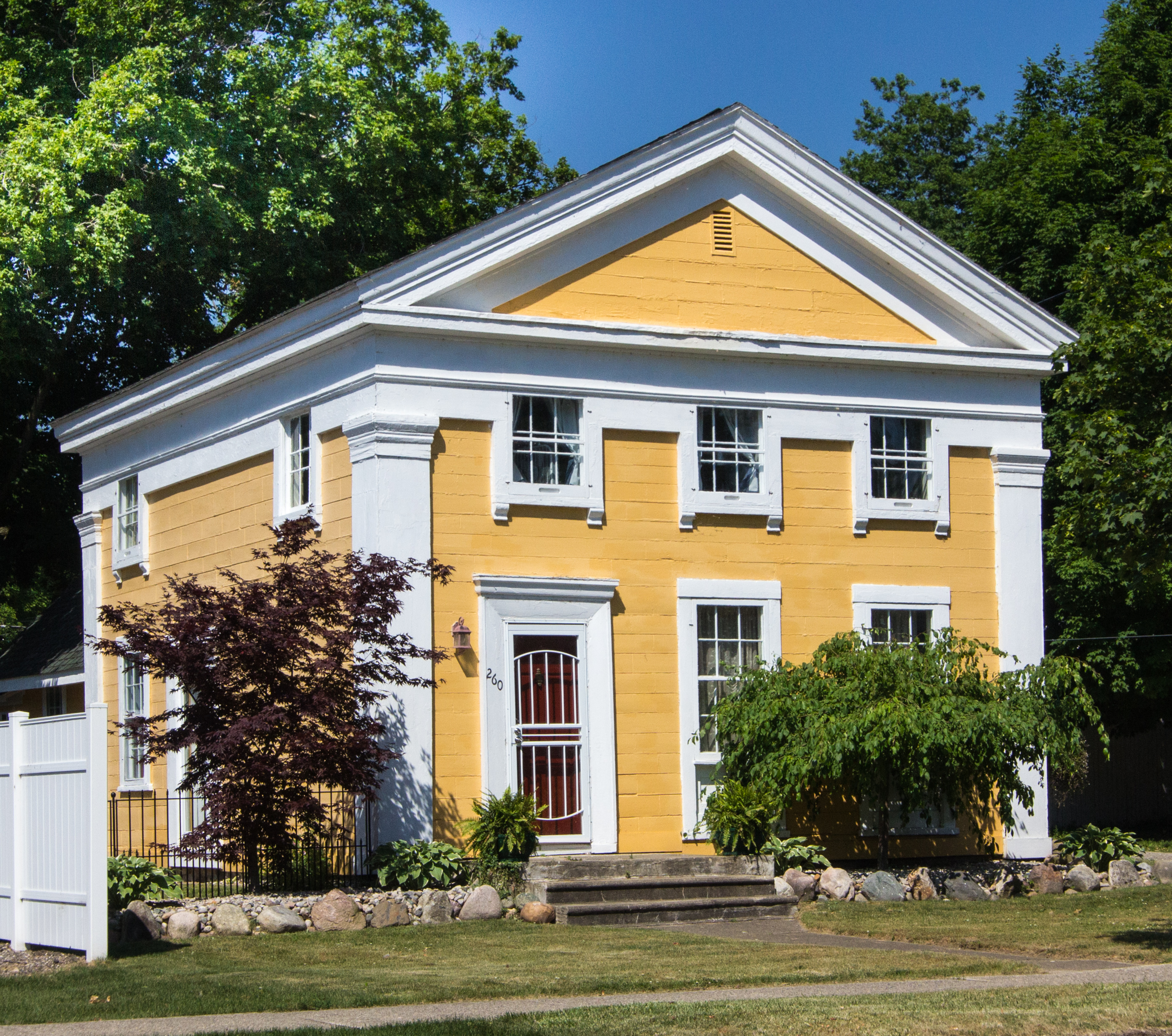
- Interactive map
- Location: 260 South Washington St., Constantine, Michigan
- Coordinates: 41°50′26″N 85°40′05″W
- Built: 1847
- Architectural style: Greek Revival
- NRHP reference No.: 100006782
- Added to NRHP: July 26, 2021

The Nettleton-Cond House, also known as the Wells-Bryan House, is a single family home located at 260 South Washington Street in Constantine, Michigan. It was listed in the National Register of Historic Places in 2021.

== History ==
This house was constructed in 1847 by Zelus Nettleton, at a location one lot south of its present location. Nettleton sold the house to John M. Wells in 1849, who lived there until 1853. In 1867, Charles Cond purchased the house and the lot adjacent (where the house stands now). At some point between 1874 and 1884m he moved the house to its present location. Cond willed the house to his son Louis after his death, who passed it on to his wife Katherine. In 1913, Katherine Cond sold the house.

The house changed hands frequently in the subsequent years, until 1972, when it was sold to Robert and Janet Miller. The Millers ran an antique store in the house into the 1980s. In 1977, the house was listed in the Michigan State Register of Historic Sites as the "Wells-Bryan House." David and Angela Beegle purchased the property in 1997, living there until 2020. In 2021, it was sold to Arthur and Jenni Roberts.

== Description ==
The original part of the Nettleton-Cond House is a one-and-one-half story wood frame Greek Revival structure measuring 24 feet by 30 feet. Two one-story additions at the rear were constructed later in the 19th century. The façade of the house is three bays wide and asymmetrical, with the main entrance in the southernmost bay, reached by a small porch. The other two bays contain identical windows, with additional windows in the second floor above the first floor door and windows.

The corners of the house have wide wooden pilasters. Above the second floor is a cornice, with frieze and pediment above. The roof is shallow.

== See also ==
- National Register of Historic Places listings in St. Joseph County, Michigan
