= Morse–Scoville House =

- U.S. National Register of Historic Places
- Michigan State Historic Site
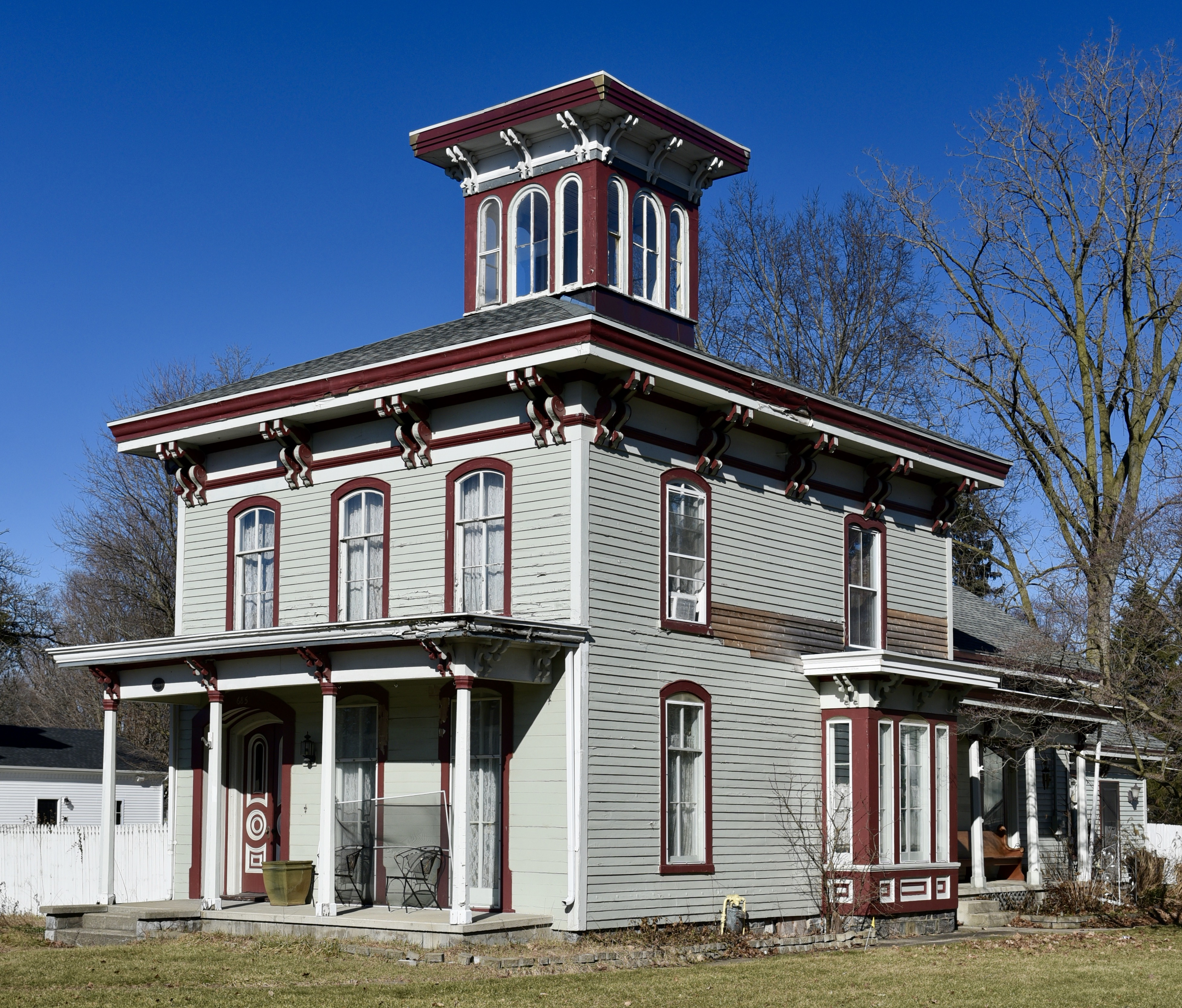

- Location within Michigan Location within the United States
- Interactive map
- Location: 685 S. Washington, Constantine, Michigan
- Coordinates: 41°50′13″N 85°39′53″W
- Area: less than one acre
- Built: 1865
- Architectural style: Italianate
- NRHP reference No.: 96000801
- Added to NRHP: July 25, 1996

The Morse–Scoville House, also known as the Bela and Jennie Hutchinson Scoville House, is a private house located at 685 South Washington Street in Constantine, Michigan. It was listed on the National Register of Historic Places in 1996.

== History ==
Dr. Francis J . Morse was one of a string of doctors who owned a drugstore in Constantine. He was active in village affairs, being a school trustee in 1859-62, and helping organize the First State Bank in 1864. In 1864, he purchased the lots on which this house stands, and had it constructed in about 1864/65. Morse deeded the property to Mary E. Eacker in 1878, who then deeded it to Jennie H. Scoville in 1881. Jennie Scoville was the wife of Dr. Bela P. Scoville, a Civil War veteran who had completed medical school at the University of Michigan in 1868. Scoville set up a medical practice in Mottville after graduation, and there married Jennie Hutchinson in 1880.

After their marriage, Bela and Jennie Hutchinson Scoville moved to Constantine into this house. They lived here until their deaths: Bela in 1917 and Jennie in 1936. The Scovilles had one son, Charles T. Scoville. The house remained in the Scoville family until 1974.

== Description ==
The Morse–Scoville House is an L-shaped two-story Italianate structure with a hipped roof and a single story, gable roofed rear addition. The exterior is clad in weatherboard, and a square cupola sits atop the roof. A single-story porch runs across the width of the front facade. The windows are tall and arched, with two-over-four panes.

== See also ==
- National Register of Historic Places listings in St. Joseph County, Michigan
