= Downtown Three Rivers Commercial Historic District =

Historic district in Michigan, United States

- U.S. National Register of Historic Places
- U.S. Historic district
- Michigan State Historic Site
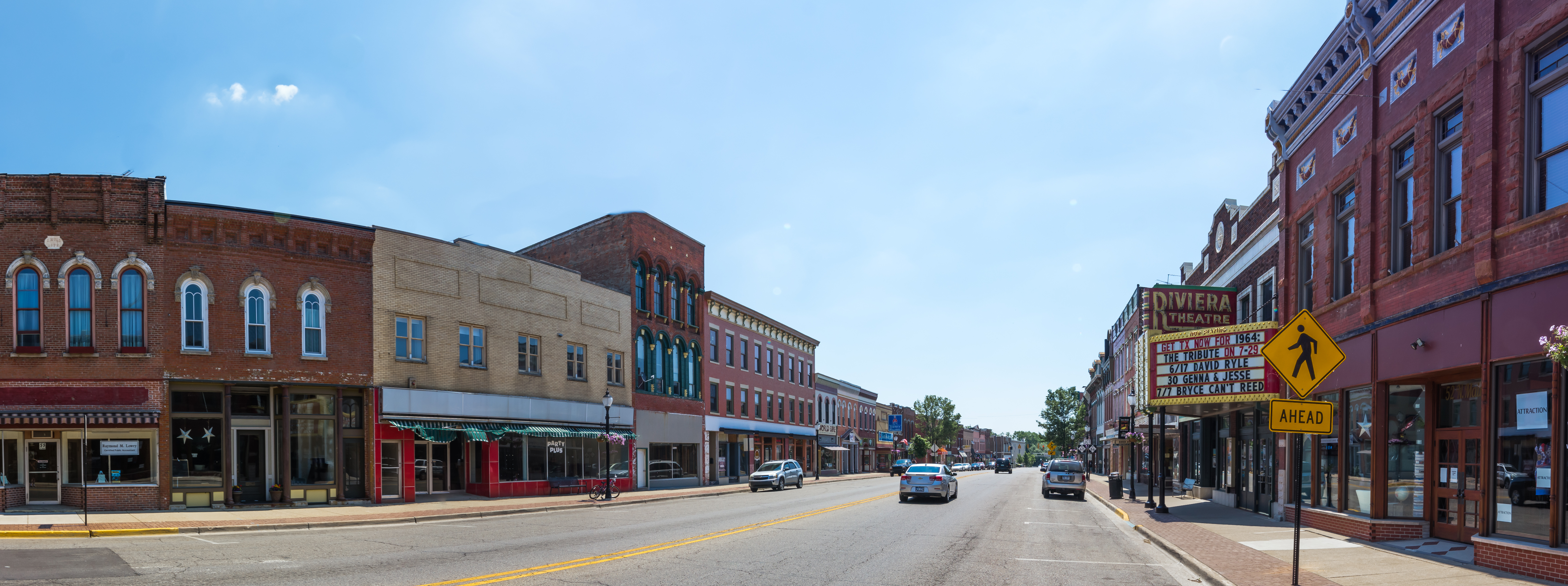
- Downtown, 2017

- Location within Michigan Location within the United States
- Interactive map
- Location: N. Main St., Michigan and Portage Aves., Three Rivers, Michigan
- Coordinates: 41°56′42″N 85°38′01″W
- Area: 5 acres (2.0 ha)
- Architectural style: Italianate
- NRHP reference No.: 82004472
- Added to NRHP: April 29, 1982

The Downtown Three Rivers Commercial Historic District is a commercial historic district located along North Main Street, between Michigan and Portage Avenues, in Three Rivers, Michigan. It was listed on the National Register of Historic Places in 1982.

== History ==
The original section of Three Rivers, including what is now the downtown and some surrounding residential areas, was platted in 1836 by John H. Bowman. This location immediately began to serve as the commercial center of the settlement, with modest wooden buildings constructed along what is now Main Street as early as the 1830s. A number of mills were constructed in the area in the 1830s and 1840s, and in 1851 the Lockport Hydraulic Company was formed to dam the river and construct a power canal. This was followed in 1853 by the construction of a railroad line through the village. As a result, Three Rivers boomed in the latter half of the 19th century, with a wave of new construction starting in the 1850s.

The oldest extant buildings in the district are the Kelsey block at 39-43 N. Main (built in 1854), the Whitesell and McMurtrie block at 109 Portage (built in 1859), and the 1861 block at 18 N. Main. Further construction filled the downtown in the 1860s, 70s, and 80s. These buildings were constructed almost exclusively by local investors, primarily merchants. Seven of the commercial blocks, however, were built by farmer Isaac Null over the period of 1863-1886. In 1884, Null also built his house, located within the district at 105 W. Michigan. The downtown area remains one of the most intact nineteenth and early twentieth-century downtowns in southwest Michigan

== Description ==
The Downtown Three Rivers Commercial Historic District contains all the structures remaining from Three Rivers' late 19th century commercial center. The district contains 48 structures, including one residence, the former public library, and 46 one- to three-story commercial buildings. The commercial buildings are predominantly Commercial Italianate structures, and are set side by side and directly on the sidewalk. The visually unified and harmonious Late Victorian streetscape gives the district its character.

Significant buildings include:

- Prutzman Block (22-24 North Main), a lavishly detailed two story, seven bay Italianate structure.
- Three blocks (34, 36 and 38 North Main) with mansard roofs constructed in the 1870s.
- 52-56 North Main, a broad commercial block constructed in 1890.
- Riviera Theatre (50 N. Main), a classical theatre with a projecting Art Moderne marquee, constructed in the 1920s in the shell of an 1860s block.
- Three Rivers Savings and Loan "south building" (101 S. Main), a single story buff brick Neo-Classical building trimmed with terra cotta, constructed in 1916.
- Public Library (107 N. Main), a 2-1/2 story cross-gable building constructed of rubble stone with shingled gables. It was built in 1904, and designed by A.W. Rush & Co. of Grand Rapids.

== Gallery ==
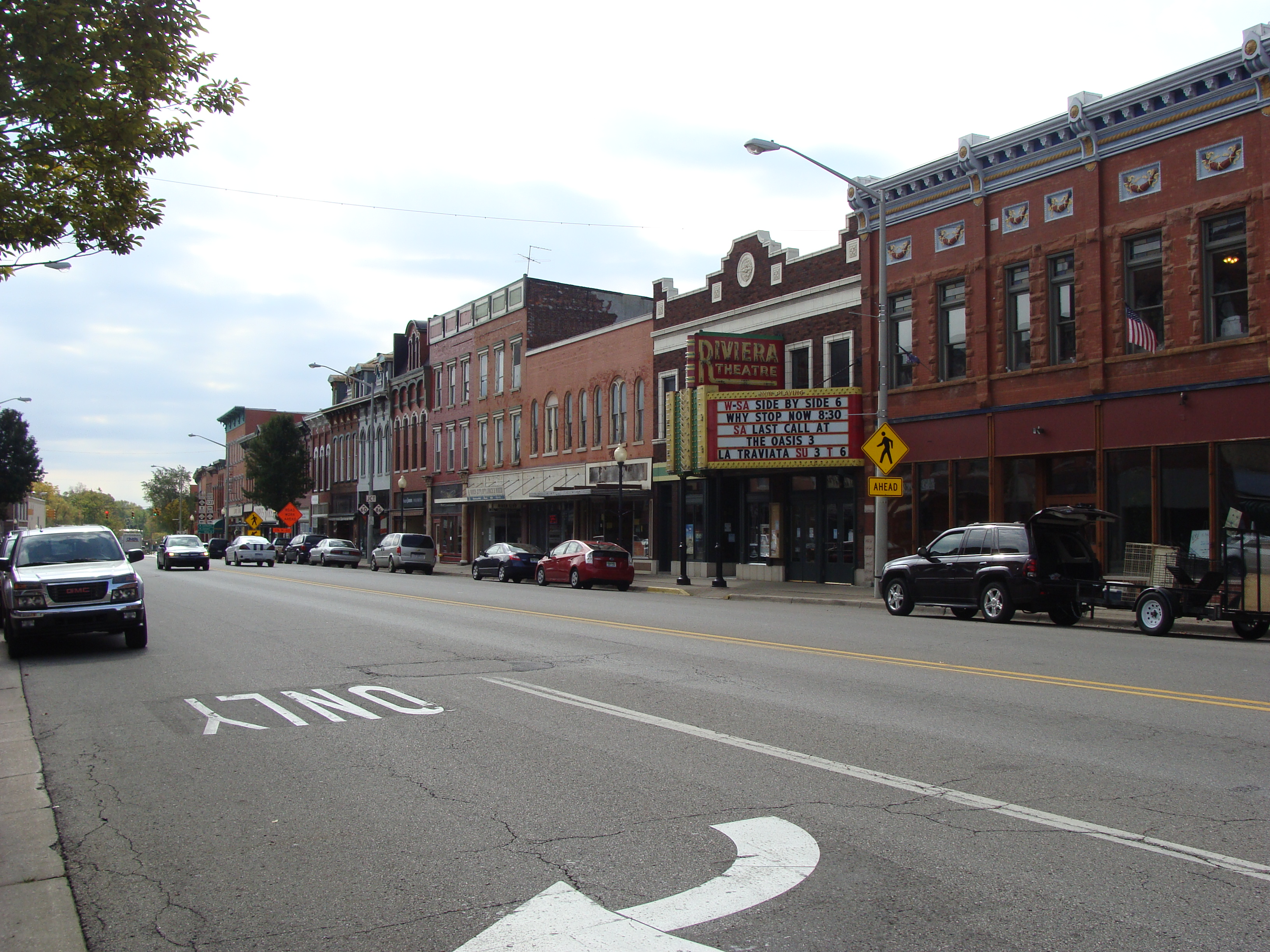
Downtown Streetscape, 2012

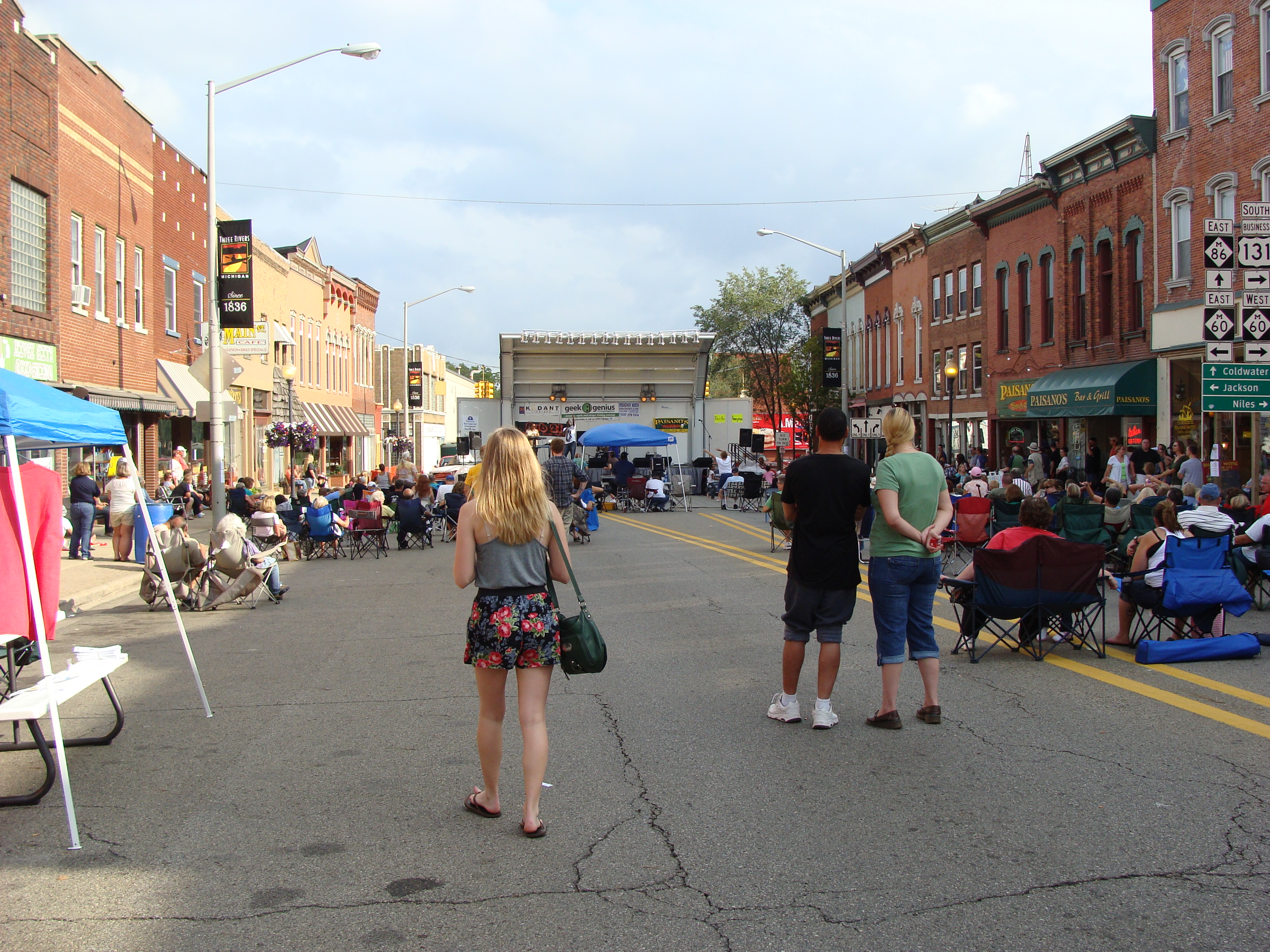
Downtown Streetscape during Harmont Fest, 2012

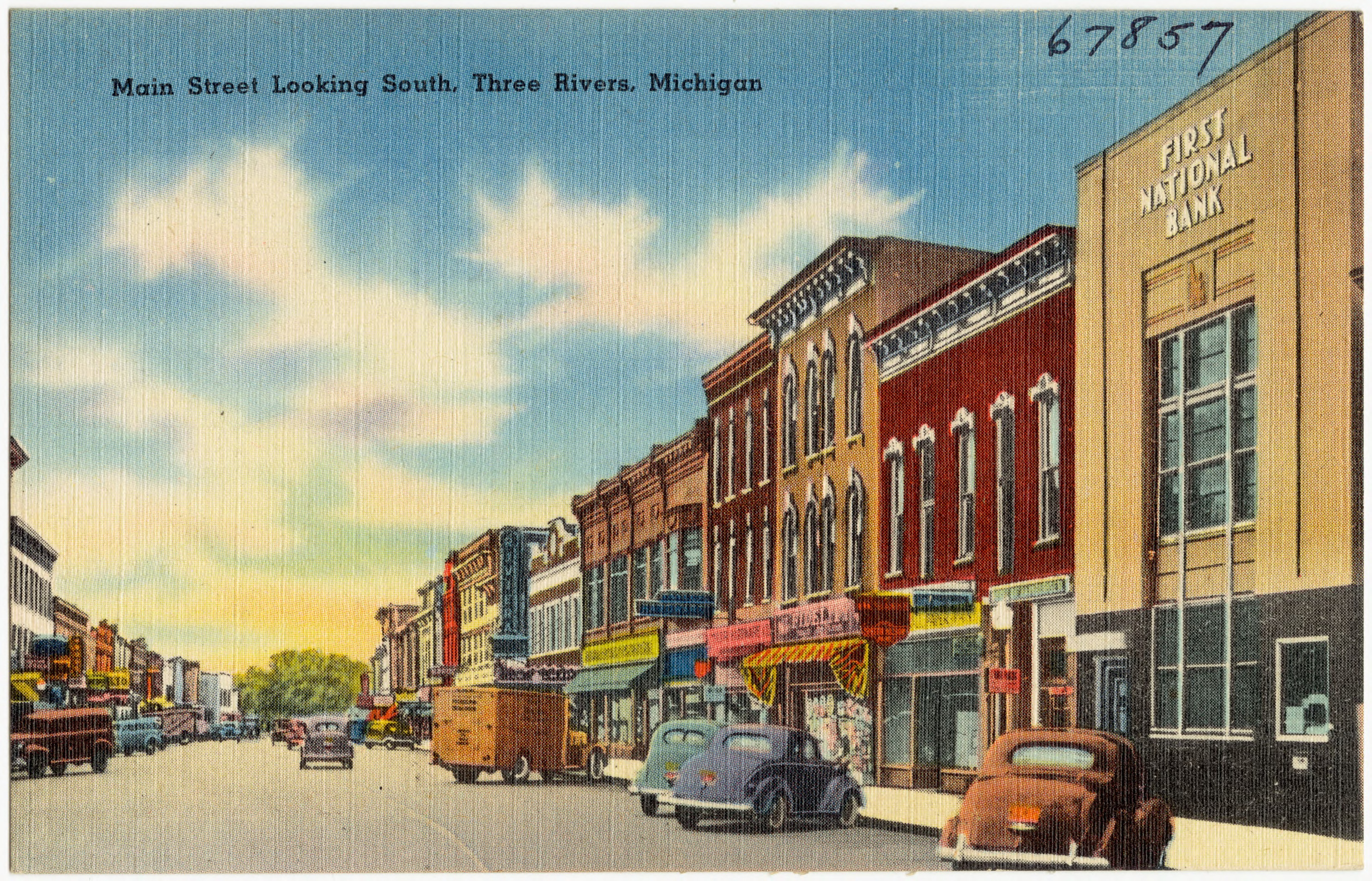
Main Street looking south, c. 1940

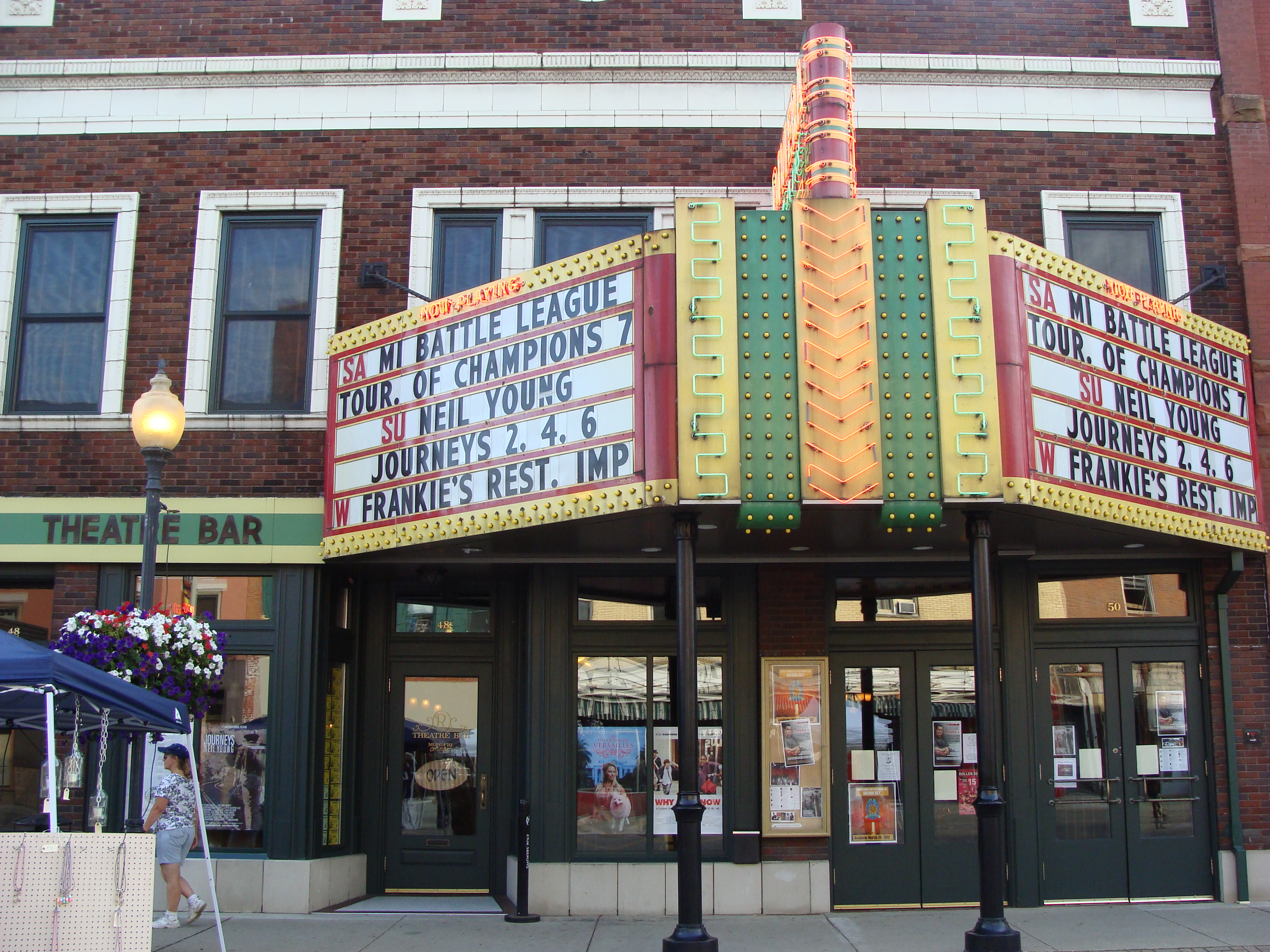
The Rivera Theater and Bar

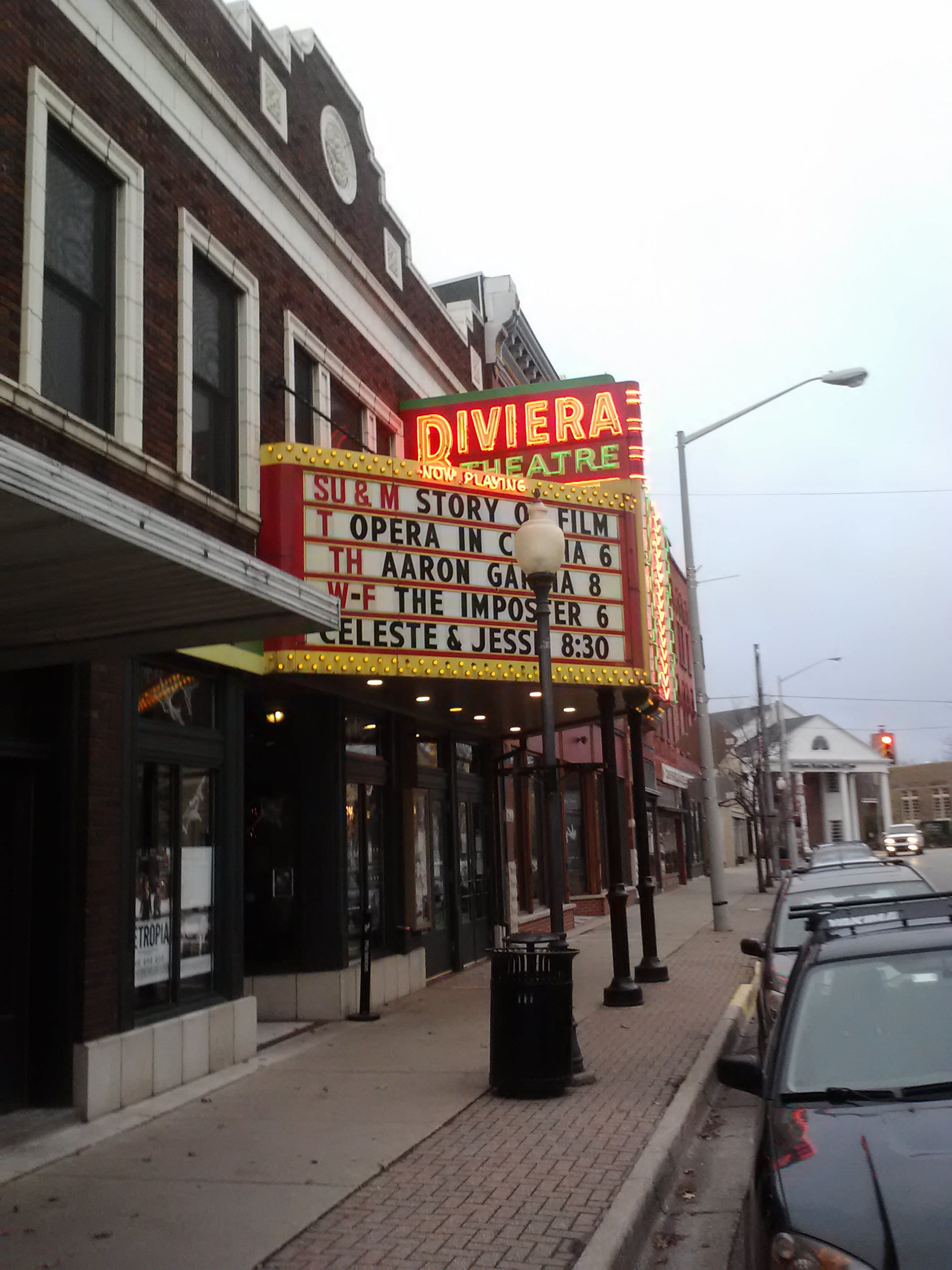
The Riviera Theatre

== See also ==
- National Register of Historic Places in St. Joseph County, Michigan
