= Wahbememe Burial Site and Monument =

Historic place in St. Joseph County, Michigan, US

- U.S. National Register of Historic Places
- Michigan State Historic Site

- Location within Michigan Location within the United States
- Interactive map
- Nearest city: White Pigeon, Michigan
- Coordinates: 41°47′52″N 85°39′46″W
- Area: 1.2 acres (0.49 ha)
- Built: 1909
- NRHP reference No.: 95000867
- Added to NRHP: July 21, 1995

The Wahbememe Burial Site and Monument, also known as the Chief White Pigeon Monument, is a monument located at the junction of U.S. Routes 12 and 131 near White Pigeon, Michigan. It is the burial place of Potawatomi chief Wahbememe (White Pigeon), who died sometime after 1833, as he was mentioned in the proceedings of the Treaty of Chicago. It was placed on the National Register of Historic Places in 1995. The location is now the Wahbememe Memorial Park.

== Description ==
The burial site of Wahbememe is on a low rise, located in a small park. It shares the park with memorials honoring fallen soldiers.

The monument is eight feet tall, and consists of a granite boulder supported by a concrete base. The base is three blocks high, with a slanting cap transitioning from a wider, two-block high lower section to an upper section a single block high. One side of the boulder is smoothed, and carries the inscription:

IN
MEMORY OF
WAHBEMEME
CHIEF WHITE PIGEON
WHO ABOUT 1830 GAVE
HIS LIFE TO SAVE THE
SETTLEMENT AT THIS
PLACE

The base below carries the additional inscription:

GREATER LOVE HATH NO MAN THAN THIS
THAT A MAN LAY DOWN HIS LIFE FOR HIS FRIENDS

== History ==
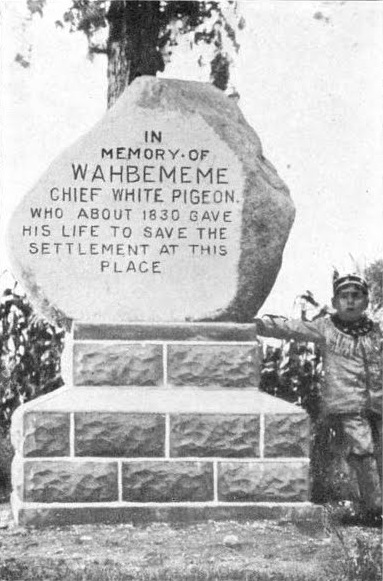
Burial Site in 1909, with Willie White Pigeon

In the late 18th and early 19th centuries, the Potawatomi controlled a large territory around the southern portion of Lake Michigan, including this area. Around the turn of the century, Wahbememe (White Pigeon) was the chief of a village located west of here, near the St. Joseph River, and was one of the signers of the 1795 Treaty of Greenville. During the War of 1812, when the Potawatomi allied with the British, Wahbememe reportedly served as a messenger between local Potawatomi bands and Main Poc and Tecumseh. He was captured by American forces in 1815. Nothing more is known about Wahbememe, save that he died some time before the first European settlers arrived in the White Pigeon area in 1827.

White Pigeon was the first permanent settlement in southern Michigan outside of Wayne and Washtenaw counties. The first settlers arrived in 1827, and White Pigeon Township was organized in 1829. That same year, a Mr. Earl claimed the lot of land on which this site is located, and was told by the Potawatomi that Wahbememe was buried there. Earl built a house at the location, and the Potawatomi promptly burned it leading Earl to build elsewhere and mark the spot with a poplar tree.

Although the grave was a well-known landmark to the earliest settlers (indeed, the May 29, 1839, White Pigeon Republican contained a short story on the gravesite), a tradition arose that in about 1830 Wahbememe attended a council in the Detroit area, and, learning of a planned Indian attack on the White Pigeon settlement, ran straight to White Pigeon to warn the settlers. After arriving in time, he then collapsed and died. This story, although commemorated on the monument, is unlikely to be true, as Wahbememe's grave existed when White Pigeon was first settled.

By 1877, the local populace considered erecting a monument at the grave site. Although there was some talk of doing so, nothing concrete occurred until 1909, when the Alba Columba Club, a White Pigeon women's club, raised funds to construct a monument. A boulder was hauled to the site, and the monument was unveiled on August 10, 1909, by six-year old Willie White Pigeon, a direct descendant of Wahbememe, in front of a crowd of over 4000 people.

The monument, however, still stood on private property. In 1922, the owners, Albert G. and Claudia E. Wade, conveyed an easement on a small parcel to the St. Joseph County Board of Road Commissioners to create a park. The county created what is now the Wahbememe Memorial Park at the site. In 1986, the farm which the site was part of was parceled out to make an industrial park, and the new owners deeded the park property to the St. Joseph County Historical Society. The monument was rededicated on July 11, 1987.

== See also ==
- National Register of Historic Places listings in St. Joseph County, Michigan
