= Arthur Silliman House =

- U.S. National Register of Historic Places
- Michigan State Historic Site
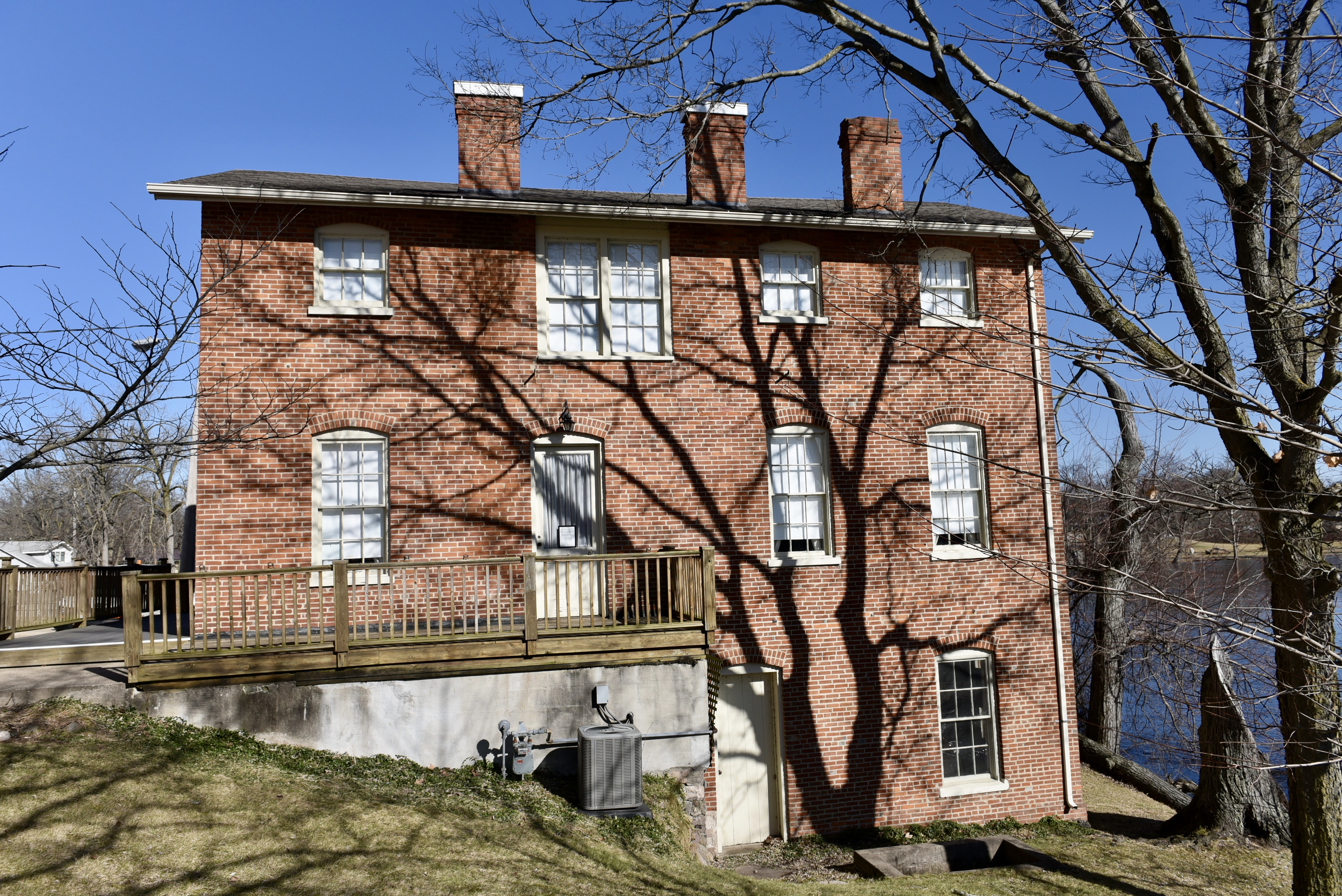

- Location within Michigan Location within the United States
- Interactive map
- Location: 116 S. Main St., Three Rivers, Michigan
- Coordinates: 41°56′37″N 85°37′55″W
- Area: less than one acre
- Built: 1868
- NRHP reference No.: 79002662
- Added to NRHP: November 20, 1979

The Arthur Silliman House is a private house located at 116 South Main Street in Three Rivers, Michigan. It was listed on the National Register of Historic Places in 1979, and now houses The Historic Silliman Home and Blacksmith Shop.

== History ==
Arthur Silliman was born in 1831 in White Deer Valley, Pennsylvania to Alexander Silliman. In 1845, Samuel Silliman, one of Arthur's brothers, moved to St. Joseph County and sent back glowing reports. Inspired by his son's success, Alexander Silliman moved his family to the same area in 1847. Arthur Silliman went into the blacksmith trade in the 1850s, first renting a building on Portage Avenue in Three Rivers. In 1864 he purchased two lots at the corner of Michigan and Main streets near this site, and constructed his own shop.

In 1867 Silliman sold his shop and purchased this plot of land next to the St. Joseph River. He likely constructed this house soon afterward, in about 1868. The building served both as the Silliman family home and as Arthur Silliman's blacksmith and wagon-building shop. He used the house for a number of years, and in 1903 deeded it to his daughter, Sue I. Silliman. Sue Silliman was a librarian and state historian for the Michigan Daughters of the American Revolution. Her love of history prompted her to donate the house too the city of Three Rivers just before her death in 1945.

However, the city soon sold the house to the Three Rivers World War Veterans Home Association, and it was subsequently refurbished to provide a home for the local American Legion post. In 1976 the house was sold to the General Telephone Company of Michigan. The company proposed to donate the house to the local chapter of the Daughters of the American Revolution on the condition that funds were raised for its restoration. The funds were raised, and in 1980 restoration work was begun. The restoration was completed the next year, and the house was deeded to the DAR. The house was opened to the public as a museum, and continues to operate as The Historic Silliman Home and Blacksmith Shop.

== Description ==
The Arthur Silliman House is located on a sloped, narrow lot on the bank of the St. Joseph River, very close to the river itself. The house is a three-story rectangular flank-gable brick structure on a fieldstone foundation measuring 40 feet by 24 feet. Because of the slope of the lot, the lowest story is exposed on the river side, but underground on the opposite side. The windows are six-over-six lights with brick, segmental arch heads.

The house as originally built contained a blacksmith's shop on the first floor, living quarters (a hall, kitchen, dining room, living room, and two bedrooms) on the second, and open storage space on the third. There were no internal staircases connecting the floors, only exterior stairs.

== See also ==
- National Register of Historic Places listings in St. Joseph County, Michigan
