= General Land Office (White Pigeon, Michigan) =

- General Land Office Building
- U.S. National Register of Historic Places
- Michigan State Historic Site
- The Old Land Office Building in 2019

- Location within Michigan Location within the United States
- Interactive map
- Location: 113 West Chicago Road (US-12), White Pigeon, MI
- Coordinates: 41°47′53″N 85°38′38″W
- Area: 0.1 acres (0.040 ha)
- Built: 1830
- Architectural style: Greek Revival
- NRHP reference No.: 88003234

Significant dates
- Added to NRHP: February 7, 1989
- Designated MSHS: April 10, 1986

The White Pigeon Prairie Land Office in White Pigeon, Michigan is the oldest surviving land office in Michigan and was in business 1831–1834. It is designated as a Michigan State Historic Site. The United States land offices were the federal government agency that was primarily responsible for the sale and of public land to individual purchasers. Michigan's first land office was established in Detroit in 1804. The US Land office in White Pigeon was the third office to open in Michigan and was created on the Sauk Trail (today U.S. 12) as pioneers were moving west in search of viable land..,

The White Pigeon land office's location on the Chicago Road (Sauk Trail), which linked Chicago and Detroit was chosen as it was the largest village west of Jackson, MI. . The first settler in Kent County, Michigan bought land from the office was Louis Campau in October 1833.

The U.S. started issuing land in Michigan after the 1821 Treaty of Chicago, in which the Potawatomi and other tribes turned over their land, was signed in 1821. The White Pigeon land office operated for 4 years from 1831 to 1834. During that time over a quarter million acres of land were sold from this office at a rate of $1.25 per acre. In 1834, the White Pigeon register Abraham S. Edwards and receiver, Thomas C. Sheldon moved to the newly created land office in Bronson-now Kalamazoo.

The land office was listed on the National Register of Historic Places on February 7, 1989.

The White Pigeon land office is the oldest building in Southwest Michigan and one of the oldest in the state.

== Design ==
The land office was built in the Greek Revival architectural style which was a prevalent style during this time period. It is located in downtown White Pigeon, MI. The site was renovated in 2019 and features displays and exhibits relating to surveying, land purchase and the history of the area.

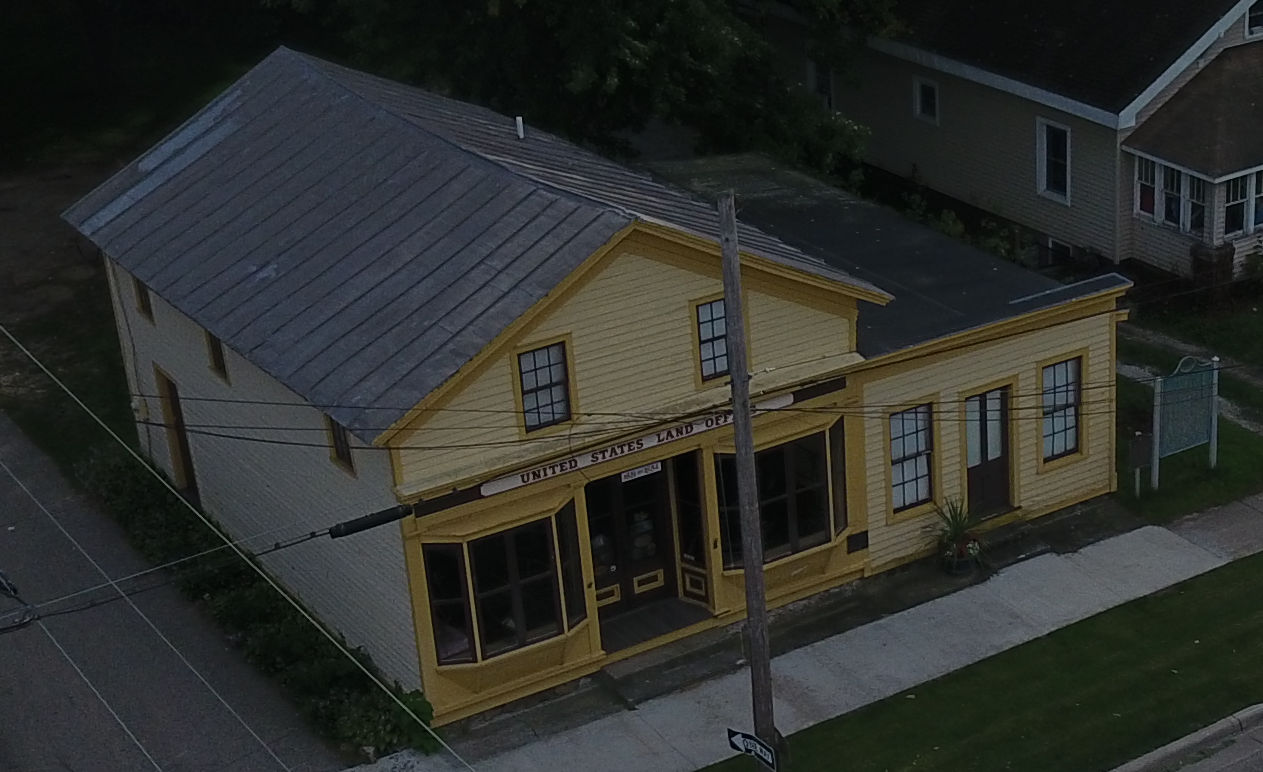
Aerial photo of front of the Old US Government Land Office Building

== See also ==
- National Register of Historic Places listings in St. Joseph County, Michigan
