= Leverett and Amanda Clapp House =

Historic house in Michigan, United States

- Leverett A. and Amanda (Hampson) Clapp House
- U.S. National Register of Historic Places
- Michigan State Historic Site
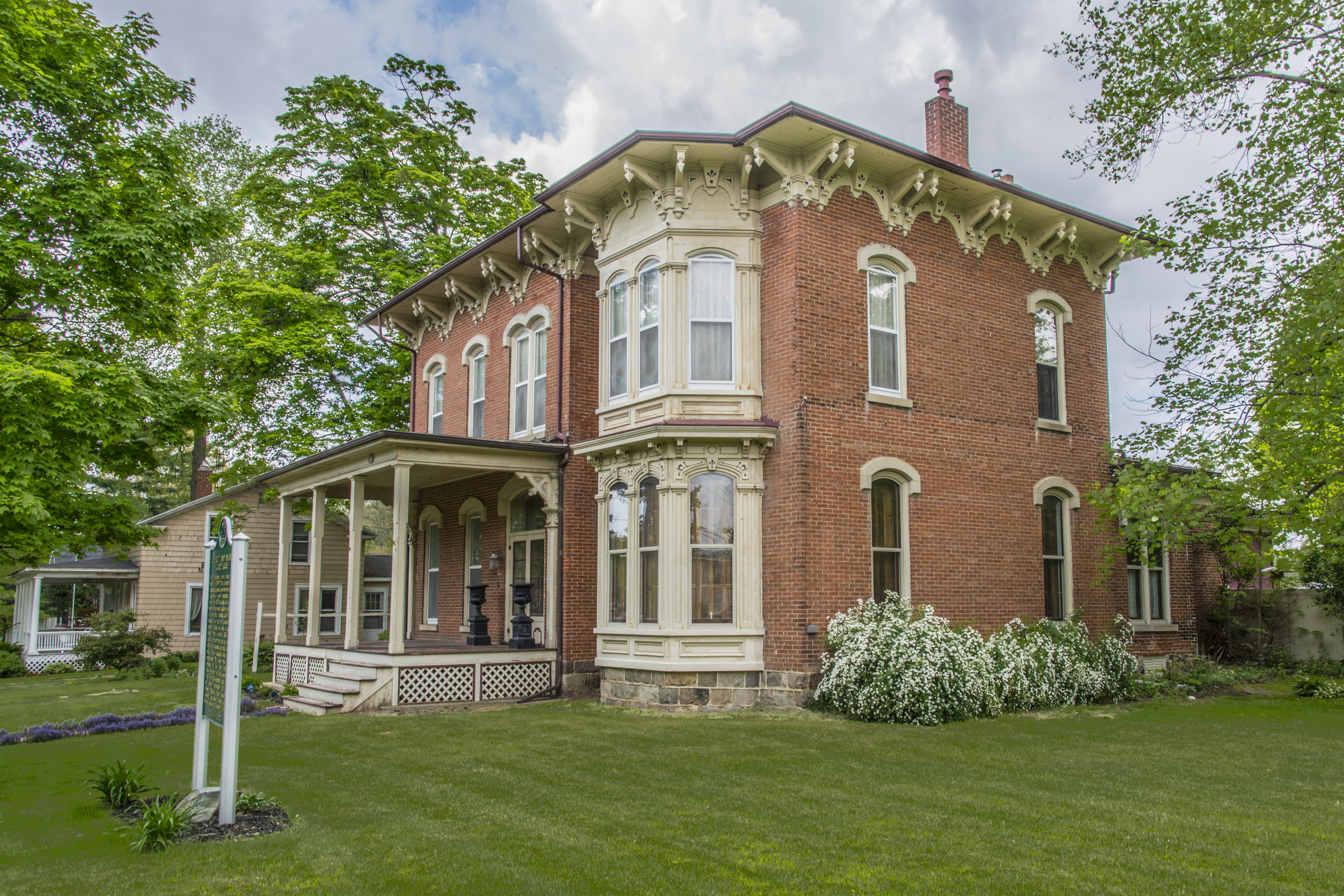
- Leverett A. and Amanda (Hampson) Clapp House

- Location within Michigan Location within the United States
- Interactive map
- Location: 324 W. Main St., Centreville, Michigan
- Coordinates: 41.9239°N 85.5305°W
- Built: 1880
- Architectural style: Italianate
- NRHP reference No.: 09000476

Significant dates
- Added to NRHP: July 1, 2009
- Designated MSHS: 2009

The Leverett and Amanda Clapp House is a historic house located in Centreville, Michigan. The building was built in 1879–80 for Leverett and Amanda Hampson Clapp. The brick building has two stories and was built in the Italianate style.

In 2009, the house was listed on the National Register of Historic Places and listed as a Michigan State Historic Site.

== History ==
Leverett A. Clapp was born in Mottville, Michigan in 1837 to Asahel and Charlotte (May) Clapp. He was a direct descendant of Captain Roger Clapp, who captained a Puritan ship which arrived in New England in 1630. In 1856, Asahel Clapp was elected as the St. Joseph County register of deeds, and Leverett Clapp worked for him until 1864 when he was elected in his own right. He served as Nottawa Township Clerk from 1868 to 1870, and in 1872 he was elected as the Michigan State Land Commissioner. Clapp also served as secretary of the Farmers' Mutual Fire Insurance Company and was president of the First National Bank of Centreville.

Leverett Clapp married Amanda E. Hampson on December 6, 1864. The couple had a single child, Edwin Lacey Clapp, born September 24, 1865. In 1879, Amanda Clapp's mother deeded her a lot on this site, and the Clapps obtained a second lot next door. In 1880, the Clapps built this house at the site and moved into it. In 1894, Edwin Clapp married and moved his wife into the house. In 1900, the Clapps sold the home to Seth W. Keasey, and built another home a few blocks away where they lived until both died. Leverett Clapp died in 1929.

Seth W. Keasey lived in this house until his death. After his wife dies, the house passed to their son, Floyd W. Keasey and his wife, Genevieve. When they died, the house passed to their daughter, Frances. IN 1959, Frances sold it to John and Virginia Browne. Over the next few decades, the house was sold to Marion Kastner, then her daughter, Joan Berger, then Joseph and Gloria Hittler and then David and Rene Daniels. In 2004, the Daniels sold it to Richard and Elizabeth Campbell.

== Description ==
The Clapp House is an asymmetrical two-story brick Italianate structure with a low-pitch hip roof having wide eaves with paired brackets underneath. The front facade has a two-story slant-sided bay window at one end with deep front entry porch at the other, which runs from the corner of the house to the central entrance. There is a single story hip roof rear ell.

On the interior, the central entry leads to a foyer, which opens onto an east and west parlor, and a stairway upward. Beneath the stair, another door leads to the dining room and breakfast room. The first floor also contains a kitchen and a small bathroom. The formal rooms on the first floor all have twelve foot ceilings, and have broad and elaborately molded dark stained wood trim. The second floor contains a sitting area at the top of the stair, two bedrooms, a bathroom, and servant's quarters.

== See also ==
- National Register of Historic Places listings in St. Joseph County, Michigan
