= Colon Township, Michigan =

- Township
- Location within the state of Michigan Colon Township, Michigan (the United States)
- Coordinates: 41°56′53″N 85°19′54″W
- Country: United States
- State: Michigan
- County: St. Joseph

Area
  - Total: 36.4 sq mi (94.2 km^{2})
  - Land: 34.6 sq mi (89.5 km^{2})
  - Water: 1.8 sq mi (4.6 km^{2})
- Elevation: 879 ft (268 m)

Population (2020)
  - Total: 3,325
  - Density: 96.2/sq mi (37.2/km^{2})
- Time zone: UTC-5 (Eastern (EST))
  - Summer (DST): UTC-4 (EDT)
- FIPS code: 26-17370
- GNIS feature ID: 1626118
- Website: https://www.colontownship.org/

Colon Township is a civil township of St. Joseph County, Michigan. The population was 3,325 at the time of the 2020 census. The village of Colon is located within the township.

== Geography ==
According to the United States Census Bureau, the township has a total area of 36.4 square miles (94 km^{2}), of which 34.6 square miles (90 km^{2}) is land and 1.8 square miles (4.7 km^{2}) (4.95%) is water.

== Demographics ==
As of the census of 2000, there were 3,405 people, 1,332 households, and 943 families residing in the township. The population density was 98.5 inhabitants per square mile (38.0/km^{2}). There were 1,759 housing units at an average density of 50.9 per square mile (19.7/km^{2}). The racial makeup of the township was 97.71% White, 0.50% African American, 0.23% Native American, 0.23% Asian, 0.12% from other races, and 1.20% from two or more races. Hispanic or Latino of any race were 0.68% of the population.

There were 1,332 households, out of which 31.7% had children under the age of 18 living with them, 56.0% were married couples living together, 10.1% had a female householder with no husband present, and 29.2% were non-families. 24.6% of all households were made up of individuals, and 11.9% had someone living alone who was 65 years of age or older. The average household size was 2.55 and the average family size was 3.03.

In the township the population was spread out, with 26.6% under the age of 18, 8.2% from 18 to 24, 26.2% from 25 to 44, 24.1% from 45 to 64, and 14.9% who were 65 years of age or older. The median age was 37 years. For every 100 females, there were 99.7 males. For every 100 females age 18 and over, there were 96.5 males.

The median income for a household in the township was $34,890, and the median income for a family was $40,972. Males had a median income of $32,593 versus $21,827 for females. The per capita income for the township was $16,904. About 7.1% of families and 10.4% of the population were below the poverty line, including 14.8% of those under age 18 and 6.5% of those age 65 or over.
