= Fabius Township, Michigan =

Township in Michigan, United States

- Township
- Location within the state of Michigan Fabius Township, Michigan (the United States)
- Coordinates: 41°56′23″N 85°42′0″W
- Country: United States
- State: Michigan
- County: St. Joseph

Area
  - Total: 35.3 sq mi (91.5 km^{2})
  - Land: 32.4 sq mi (83.8 km^{2})
  - Water: 3.0 sq mi (7.7 km^{2})
- Elevation: 863 ft (263 m)

Population (2020)
  - Total: 3,311
  - Density: 102/sq mi (39.5/km^{2})
- Time zone: UTC-5 (Eastern (EST))
  - Summer (DST): UTC-4 (EDT)
- FIPS code: 26-26920
- GNIS feature ID: 1626262
- Website: Township website

Fabius Township is a civil township of St. Joseph County in the U.S. state of Michigan. The population was 3,311 at the 2020 census.

== History ==
Fabius Township was originally established in 1829 with the name of Bucks Township and was renamed to its current name in 1840.

== Geography ==
According to the United States Census Bureau, the township has a total area of 35.3 square miles (91 km^{2}), of which 32.3 square miles (84 km^{2}) is land and 3.0 square miles (7.8 km^{2}) (8.43%) is water.

== Demographics ==
As of the census of 2000, there were 3,285 people, 1,304 households, and 984 families residing in the township. The population density was 101.6 inhabitants per square mile (39.2/km^{2}). There were 1,721 housing units at an average density of 53.2 per square mile (20.5/km^{2}). The racial makeup of the township was 96.74% White, 0.94% African American, 0.40% Native American, 0.55% Asian, 0.30% from other races, and 1.07% from two or more races. Hispanic or Latino of any race were 1.04% of the population.

There were 1,304 households, out of which 27.3% had children under the age of 18 living with them, 67.3% were married couples living together, 5.3% had a female householder with no husband present, and 24.5% were non-families. 20.1% of all households were made up of individuals, and 8.0% had someone living alone who was 65 years of age or older. The average household size was 2.51 and the average family size was 2.86.

In the township the population was spread out, with 22.7% under the age of 18, 6.1% from 18 to 24, 25.4% from 25 to 44, 30.6% from 45 to 64, and 15.3% who were 65 years of age or older. The median age was 42 years. For every 100 females, there were 102.4 males. For every 100 females age 18 and over, there were 102.7 males.

The median income for a household in the township was $50,888, and the median income for a family was $58,023. Males had a median income of $40,671 versus $26,004 for females. The per capita income for the township was $23,474. About 3.1% of families and 3.6% of the population were below the poverty line, including 2.9% of those under age 18 and 6.1% of those age 65 or over.
