= White Pigeon, Michigan =

- Village
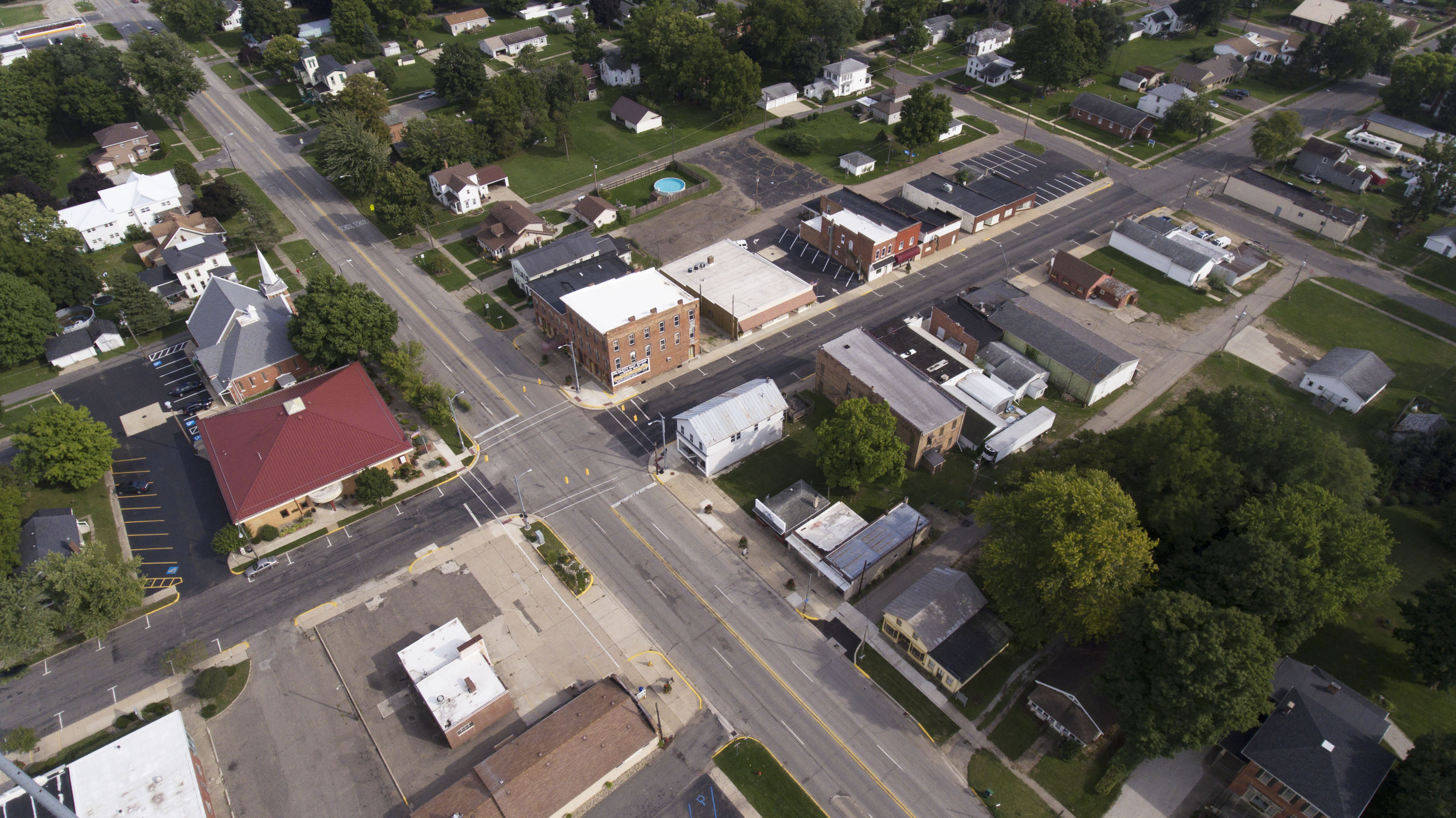
- Aerial photo of White Pigeon facing South East

- Location of White Pigeon, Michigan
- Coordinates: 41°47′51″N 85°38′35″W
- Country: United States
- State: Michigan
- County: St. Joseph

Area
  - Total: 1.42 sq mi (3.69 km^{2})
  - Land: 1.41 sq mi (3.65 km^{2})
  - Water: 0.015 sq mi (0.04 km^{2})
- Elevation: 817 ft (249 m)

Population (2020)
  - Total: 1,718
  - Density: 1,219.2/sq mi (470.72/km^{2})
- Time zone: UTC-5 (Eastern (EST))
  - Summer (DST): UTC-4 (EDT)
- FIPS code: 26-86920
- GNIS feature ID: 1625017
- Website: Village website

White Pigeon is a village in St. Joseph County in the U.S. state of Michigan. The population was 1,718 at the 2020 census. The village is located within White Pigeon Township. Its also located along Michigan's border with Indiana.

== Geography ==
According to the United States Census Bureau, the village has a total area of 1.41 square miles (3.65 km^{2}), of which 1.39 square miles (3.60 km^{2}) is land and 0.02 square miles (0.05 km^{2}) is water. The Pigeon River flows through the south end of town, emptying into the St. Joseph River that flows to Lake Michigan.

== Transportation ==
=== Major highways ===
- US 12
- US 131

=== Railroad ===
White Pigeon is served by Michigan Southern Railroad, which has its main yard complex in town, and Grand Elk Railroad to the west of town.

== History ==
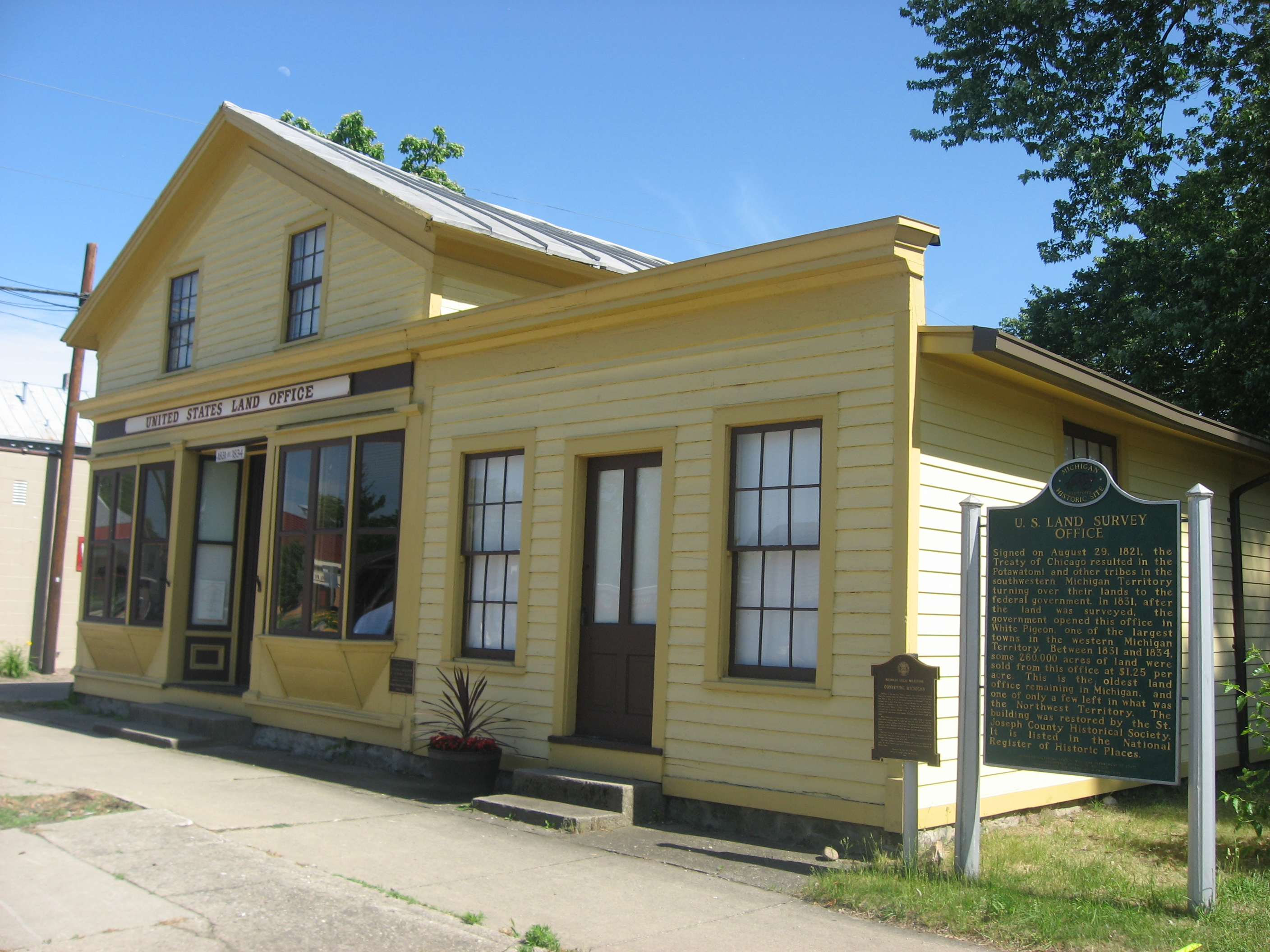
White Pigeon land office, May 2012

White Pigeon was incorporated by European Americans in 1837. The United States Land Office, located in downtown White Pigeon, is the oldest surviving U.S. Land office in the state of Michigan. Following the cession of Native American lands in this area by leaders of regional tribes, the U.S. government sold more than 250,000 acres of land in Michigan for $1.25 an acre in the 1830s to settlers of Western Michigan.

The town was named after the local Potawatomi chief Wahbememe, which means White Pigeon. He was buried near the town, with a memorial stone marking the gravesite. This gravesite is now listed on the National Register of Historic Places.

According to legend, while he was at the gathering of the chiefs in Detroit, Wahbememe heard plans to attack the settlement which is now White Pigeon. The chief was a friend to the white settlers and did not want to see harm come to them, so he set out on foot and ran almost 150 miles to the settlement to warn the people. After running that long distance and giving his warning, he collapsed and soon died from exhaustion.

In 1861, the 11th Regiment of Michigan Volunteer Infantry together with Church's Battery, nearly a thousand men, formed at a training ground near the railyard. A monument was originally placed in 1915 and rededicated in 2014 at Depot Park.

== Demographics ==
Historical population
Census	Pop.	Note	%±
1860	959		—
1870	922		−3.9%
1880	1,021		10.7%
1890	961		−5.9%
1900	705		−26.6%
1910	667		−5.4%
1920	887		33.0%
1930	966		8.9%
1940	1,017		5.3%
1950	1,113		9.4%
1960	1,399		25.7%
1970	1,455		4.0%
1980	1,478		1.6%
1990	1,458		−1.4%
2000	1,627		11.6%
2010	1,522		−6.5%
2020	1,718		12.9%
U.S. Decennial Census

=== 2020 census ===
As of the 2020 census, White Pigeon had a population of 1,718. The median age was 35.3 years. 27.8% of residents were under the age of 18 and 14.7% of residents were 65 years of age or older. For every 100 females there were 96.3 males, and for every 100 females age 18 and over there were 89.9 males age 18 and over.

0.0% of residents lived in urban areas, while 100.0% lived in rural areas.

There were 669 households in White Pigeon, of which 33.6% had children under the age of 18 living in them. Of all households, 42.8% were married-couple households, 17.0% were households with a male householder and no spouse or partner present, and 28.3% were households with a female householder and no spouse or partner present. About 28.1% of all households were made up of individuals and 11.7% had someone living alone who was 65 years of age or older.

There were 726 housing units, of which 7.9% were vacant. The homeowner vacancy rate was 1.2% and the rental vacancy rate was 10.1%.

Racial composition as of the 2020 census
Race	Number	Percent
White	1,511	88.0%
Black or African American	14	0.8%
American Indian and Alaska Native	16	0.9%
Asian	11	0.6%
Native Hawaiian and Other Pacific Islander	0	0.0%
Some other race	57	3.3%
Two or more races	109	6.3%
Hispanic or Latino (of any race)	123	7.2%

=== 2010 census ===
As of the census of 2010, there were 1,522 people, 621 households, and 383 families residing in the village. The population density was 1,095.0 inhabitants per square mile (422.8/km^{2}). There were 724 housing units at an average density of 520.9 per square mile (201.1/km^{2}). The racial makeup of the village was 93.3% White, 0.3% African American, 0.9% Native American, 0.5% Asian, 2.6% from other races, and 2.4% from two or more races. Hispanic or Latino of any race were 5.2% of the population.

There were 621 households, of which 34.5% had children under the age of 18 living with them, 40.4% were married couples living together, 14.0% had a female householder with no husband present, 7.2% had a male householder with no wife present, and 38.3% were non-families. 29.3% of all households were made up of individuals, and 12.2% had someone living alone who was 65 years of age or older. The average household size was 2.45 and the average family size was 3.02.

The median age in the village was 37.1 years. 27.1% of residents were under the age of 18; 7.3% were between the ages of 18 and 24; 24.9% were from 25 to 44; 25.5% were from 45 to 64; and 15.2% were 65 years of age or older. The gender makeup of the village was 47.0% male and 53.0% female.

=== 2000 census ===
As of the census of 2000, there were 1,627 people, 602 households, and 431 families residing in the village. The population density was 1,157.8 inhabitants per square mile (447.0/km^{2}). There were 640 housing units at an average density of 455.4 per square mile (175.8/km^{2}). The racial makeup of the village was 94.59% White, 0.18% African American, 1.11% Native American, 0.55% Asian, 0.06% Pacific Islander, 2.03% from other races, and 1.48% from two or more races. Hispanic or Latino of any race were 2.58% of the population.

There were 602 households, out of which 35.4% had children under the age of 18 living with them, 51.2% were married couples living together, 15.4% had a female householder with no husband present, and 28.4% were non-families. 21.8% of all households were made up of individuals, and 6.8% had someone living alone who was 65 years of age or older. The average household size was 2.70 and the average family size was 3.13.

In the village, the population was spread out, with 29.1% under the age of 18, 9.6% from 18 to 24, 29.6% from 25 to 44, 21.5% from 45 to 64, and 10.2% who were 65 years of age or older. The median age was 33 years. For every 100 females there were 85.3 males. For every 100 females age 18 and over, there were 85.2 males.

The median income for a household in the village was $41,292, and the median income for a family was $43,182. Males had a median income of $32,470 versus $21,327 for females. The per capita income for the village was $16,895. About 10.5% of families and 13.1% of the population were below the poverty line, including 20.1% of those under age 18 and 1.8% of those age 65 or over.

== Notable people ==
- Scott Bales (born 1956), former Chief Justice of the Arizona Supreme Court grew up in White Pigeon.
- John S. Barry, fourth Governor of Michigan, lived in White Pigeon.
- Orris Pratt, farmer and member of the Wisconsin State Assembly, was born in White Pigeon.
- Samuel Pratt, farmer and member of the Wisconsin State Assembly and the Wisconsin State Senate, lived for a time in White Pigeon, where his son Orris Pratt (above) was born.
- Albert G. Wade, founder in 1909 of the Wade Advertising Agency in Chicago and a notable pioneer of radio advertising, lived in White Pigeon as a young man, where he printed the weekly newspaper and later retired to the village. A park in the Village memorializes his family.

== See also ==
- List of villages in Michigan
