= M-86 (Michigan highway) =

State highway in St. Joseph and Branch counties in Michigan, United States

M-86
- M-86 highlighted in red

Route information
- Maintained by MDOT
- Length: 34.059 mi (54.813 km)
- Existed: 1940–present

Major junctions
- West end: Bus. US 131 / M-60 in Three Rivers
- M-66 near Nottawa
- East end: US 12 near Coldwater

Location
- Country: United States
- State: Michigan
- Counties: St. Joseph, Branch

Highway system
- Michigan State Trunkline Highway System; Interstate; US; State; Byways
← M-85	→ M-87
← M-6	M-7	→ US 8

M-86 is an east–west state trunkline highway in the US state of Michigan in the southern portion of the Lower Peninsula. The highway starts at Business US Highway 131 (Bus. US 131) and M-60 in Three Rivers and ends at US Highway 12 (US 12) near Coldwater. In between, it crosses farm country and runs along a section of the Prairie River. Following a highway originally numbered M-7, the roadway was renumbered M-86 in 1940. It has been a part of the state highway system at least since 1927. Two other roadways carried the M-86 designation in the 1920s. Two bridges along the road are eligible for inclusion on the National Register of Historic Places (NRHP).

== Route description ==
M-86 begins in Three Rivers at a junction with Bus. US 131 and M-60. From there the road travels south out of town on Main Street and across the St. Joseph River. After crossing the river, the highway runs through a residential area of town and turns eastward into rural farm lands. M-86 crosses the Prairie River and follows Burr Oak Street into the community of Centreville. The highway switches to follow Main Street through downtown Centreville; east of downtown, Main Street curves along a bend in the river, and it runs parallel to the river out of town. As part of its support of the state highway system, the Michigan Department of Transportation (MDOT) tracks the traffic levels along the roads it maintains. These traffic counts are expressed in terms of average annual daily traffic (AADT), a calculation of the vehicles using a segment of roadway on a typical day of the year. In 2009, MDOT measured 7,642 vehicles including 138 trucks along M-86 in Centreville, the highest traffic levels along the whole highway. As the highway leaves town, it passes by the north side of Lake Templene, and Sand Lake near Nottawa before meeting M-66.

From the junction, M-86 and M-66 run concurrently to the north for about 1.5 miles (2.4 km), at which point M-86 branches off to the east while M-66 continues on a northerly route. M-86 continues east through agricultural land into the village of Colon. The highway follows South Street and turns north on Blackstone Avenue between Sturgeon and Palmer lakes. Turning to follow State Street, the trunkline heads out of the village to the southeast. It continues eastward along Colon Road, passing north of Matteson Lake near Matteson and through Batavia Center. In Coldwater Township, M-86 experienced its lowest traffic level in 2009 at 1,872 vehicles and 129 trucks AADT. The highway terminates at US 12 west of Coldwater near the Branch County Memorial Airport and Messenger Lake. No segment of M-86 has been listed on the National Highway System, a system of roads important to the nation's economy, defense, and mobility.

== History ==
=== Previous designations ===
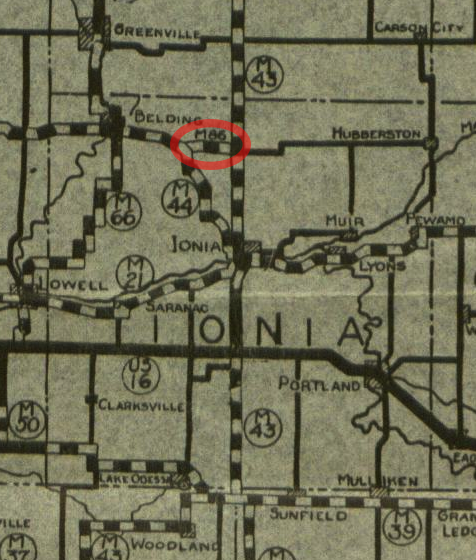
December 1, 1927 state highway map showing M-86

Upon its inception in 1921, a very different M-86 was routed along a portion of present-day M-66 from M-46 at Six Lakes northward to Remus, ending at M-24 (modern M-20). A few years later in 1924–25, M-66 was extended north to Remus, supplanting the contemporary M-86. At the same time, the M-86 designation was relocated to Ionia County to run from M-44 in Orleans to M-43 (present day M-66) just east of there. In late 1929, M-44 was extended east from Orleans to junction with M-43, once again, causing M-86 to be supplanted and removed from the highway system.

=== Current designation ===
M-7
- Location: Three Rivers – Coldwater
- Length: 34.059 mi (54.813 km)
- Existed: 1927–1940

By the end of 1927, the Michigan State Highway Department (MSHD) had designated a highway numbered M-7 between Three Rivers and Centreville. This highway was extended east by the middle of 1936. The route connected US 131 in downtown Three Rivers to US 112 outside Coldwater. At the time of the extension, all of M-7 was a gravel road. Later that year, the original segment between Three Rivers and Colon was paved, and the state extended the hard-surface route as far as Nottawa in 1937.

In 1940, at the same time all single-digit highway numbers were renumbered in the state, the M-86 designation replaced M-7. This incarnation of M-86 followed its present-day routing. Near Nottawa, M-86 ran concurrently with the contemporary M-78 north and east to Colon. In late 1948 or early 1949, the last section of highway was paved in Branch County, hard-surfacing all of M-86 for the first time. A change related to M-66 and M-78 altered M-86 in 1965. South of Battle Creek, M-66 replaced M-78. Rather than follow M-78 between Colon and Athens, M-66 used a different series of roads. The net result was that along M-86, the M-78 concurrency was replaced by a shorter M-66 concurrency. The routing has remain unchanged since.

=== Historic bridges ===
M-86 currently uses one bridge eligible for listing on the NRHP. The span over the St. Joseph River in Three Rivers was built in 1903. It is a five-span concrete arch bridge constructed to look as though created from stacked masonry blocks. The current railings were added in 1952 by the MSHD during a repair project.

The second historic structure was the bridge over the Prairie River in Centreville. This camelback pony truss span was moved to that location in 1938–39, although it was originally built on an unknown location in 1923. In the move, two sidewalks, one on either side of the trusses, were eliminated from the structure. This project was part of Public Works Administration relief work in the area. The structure was moved to Crystal Springs Road in Cass County's Pokagon Township in 2016.

== Major intersections ==
County	Location	mi	km	Destinations	Notes
St. Joseph	Three Rivers	0.000	0.000	Bus. US 131 / M-60 – Niles, Kalamazoo, Jackson	
St. Joseph	Nottawa–Colon township line	12.684	20.413	M-66 south – Sturgis	Southern end of M-66 concurrency
St. Joseph	Nottawa–Colon township line	14.425– 14.546	23.215– 23.410	M-66 north – Battle Creek	Northern end of M-66 concurrency
Branch	Coldwater Township	34.059	54.813	US 12 – Sturgis, Coldwater	
1.000 mi = 1.609 km; 1.000 km = 0.621 mi: Concurrency terminus
