= Nottawa Township, St. Joseph County, Michigan =

Nottawa Township, Michigan
- Township
- Location within the state of Michigan Nottawa Township, Michigan (the United States)
- Coordinates: 41°55′52″N 85°28′48″W
- Country: United States
- State: Michigan
- County: St. Joseph

Area
  - Total: 37.6 sq mi (97.4 km^{2})
  - Land: 35.8 sq mi (92.7 km^{2})
  - Water: 1.8 sq mi (4.7 km^{2})
- Elevation: 833 ft (254 m)

Population (2020)
  - Total: 3,685
  - Density: 103/sq mi (39.8/km^{2})
- Time zone: UTC-5 (Eastern (EST))
  - Summer (DST): UTC-4 (EDT)
- FIPS code: 26-59400
- GNIS feature ID: 1626827
- Website: Township website

Nottawa Township is a civil township of St. Joseph County in the U.S. state of Michigan. The population was 3,685 at the 2020 census. The township is named after the Nottawaseppi Huron Band of Potawatomi.

== History ==
Nottawa Township was the center of the Notawasepe Potawatamie Reservation which was the home of the ancestors of the Nottawasippi Potawatamies starting in 1821.

== Communities ==
- Centreville is a village on the western edge of the township, partially within adjacent Lockport Township.
- Nottawa is an unincorporated community in the southwest of the township on M-86, about two miles west of M-66 and four miles east of Centreville.
- Wasepi is an unincorporated community near the center of the township.

== Geography ==
According to the United States Census Bureau, the township has a total area of 37.6 square miles (97.4 km^{2}), of which 35.8 square miles (92.7 km^{2}) is land and 1.8 square miles (4.7 km^{2}) (4.81%) is water.

== Demographics ==
As of the census of 2000, there were 3,999 people, 1,325 households, and 1,004 families residing in the township. The population density was 111.7 inhabitants per square mile (43.1/km^{2}). There were 1,521 housing units at an average density of 42.5 per square mile (16.4/km^{2}). The racial makeup of the township was 96.77% White, 1.15% African American, 0.25% Native American, 0.53% Asian, 0.25% from other races, and 1.05% from two or more races. Hispanic or Latino of any race were 1.08% of the population.

There were 1,325 households, out of which 36.6% had children under the age of 18 living with them, 62.6% were married couples living together, 9.4% had a female householder with no husband present, and 24.2% were non-families. 20.2% of all households were made up of individuals, and 8.8% had someone living alone who was 65 years of age or older. The average household size was 2.83 and the average family size was 3.26.

In the township the population was spread out, with 28.7% under the age of 18, 9.8% from 18 to 24, 25.9% from 25 to 44, 22.7% from 45 to 64, and 13.0% who were 65 years of age or older. The median age was 35 years. For every 100 females, there were 98.9 males. For every 100 females age 18 and over, there were 101.5 males.

The median income for a household in the township was $41,875, and the median income for a family was $48,724. Males had a median income of $36,448 versus $23,750 for females. The per capita income for the township was $16,814. About 7.3% of families and 10.1% of the population were below the poverty line, including 14.4% of those under age 18 and 7.2% of those age 65 or over.
