= Constantine, Michigan =

- Village
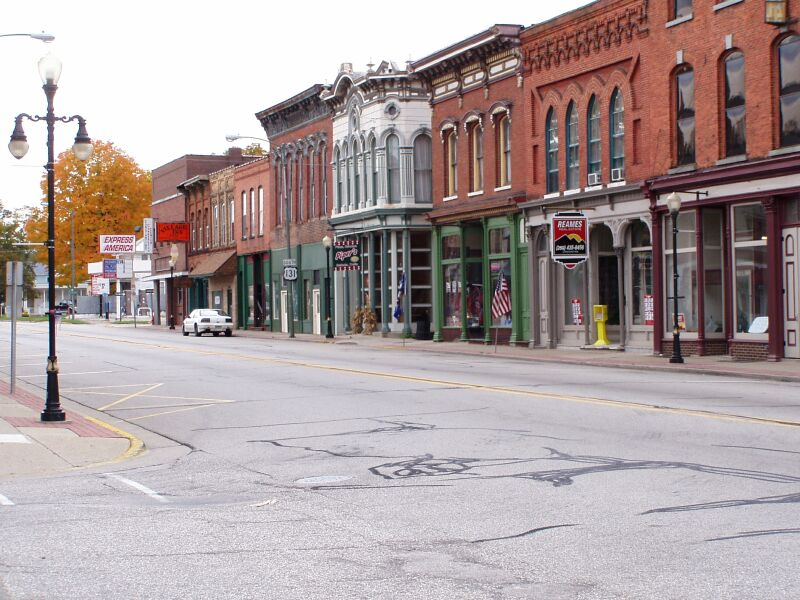
- Main Street, Old U.S. 131 through town

- Location of Constantine, Michigan
- Coordinates: 41°50′23″N 85°39′53″W
- Country: United States
- State: Michigan
- County: St. Joseph

Area
  - Total: 1.78 sq mi (4.61 km^{2})
  - Land: 1.64 sq mi (4.24 km^{2})
  - Water: 0.14 sq mi (0.37 km^{2})
- Elevation: 790 ft (240 m)

Population (2020)
  - Total: 1,947
  - Density: 1,190/sq mi (459.6/km^{2})
- Time zone: UTC-5 (Eastern (EST))
  - Summer (DST): UTC-4 (EDT)
- FIPS code: 26-17840
- GNIS feature ID: 1624472
- Website: Village website

Constantine is a village in St. Joseph County in the U.S. state of Michigan. As of the 2020 census, Constantine had a population of 1,947. The village is located within Constantine Township. U.S. Highway 131 (Main Street in the village) leads to Kalamazoo to the north and to the Indiana Toll Road six miles to the south. The St. Joseph River, navigable from source to outlet, passes through the village, emptying in Lake Michigan to the west.

The telephone provider is Verizon and the electric provider is AEP Indiana Michigan Power. Located in an agricultural area, Constantine is known as the Seed Corn Capital of the World, as both Monsanto and Pioneer having their biggest facilities located here.

Constantine is the birthplace of Harry Hill Bandholtz, a US brigadier general in World War I and head of the US Military Mission to Hungary.

Constantine is served by Constantine Public Schools.

== History ==
The Potawatomi and related Native Americans historically had villages along the St. Joseph River and other waterways. Several of their leaders signed the Treaty of Chicago, agreeing to cede much of their land in southwestern Michigan, Indiana and Ohio country.

The village was platted in 1831 at the Fawn River's confluence with the St. Joseph River, where three European-American families had settled. A gristmill, the first in the county to run by water, had been built here in 1830.

It was first named Meeks Mill after Johnathon Meeks, who built the first grain mill. A Yankee from New York or New England, he moved to several other frontier areas, each time having a town named after him. When using names of classical figures later came into vogue, the village was renamed for the Roman emperor Constantine the Great.

The Main Street of town is a historic center with richly detailed, two-story commercial buildings of the late 19th century. It is designated US 131 through the village and connected to newer roads outside.

== Geography ==
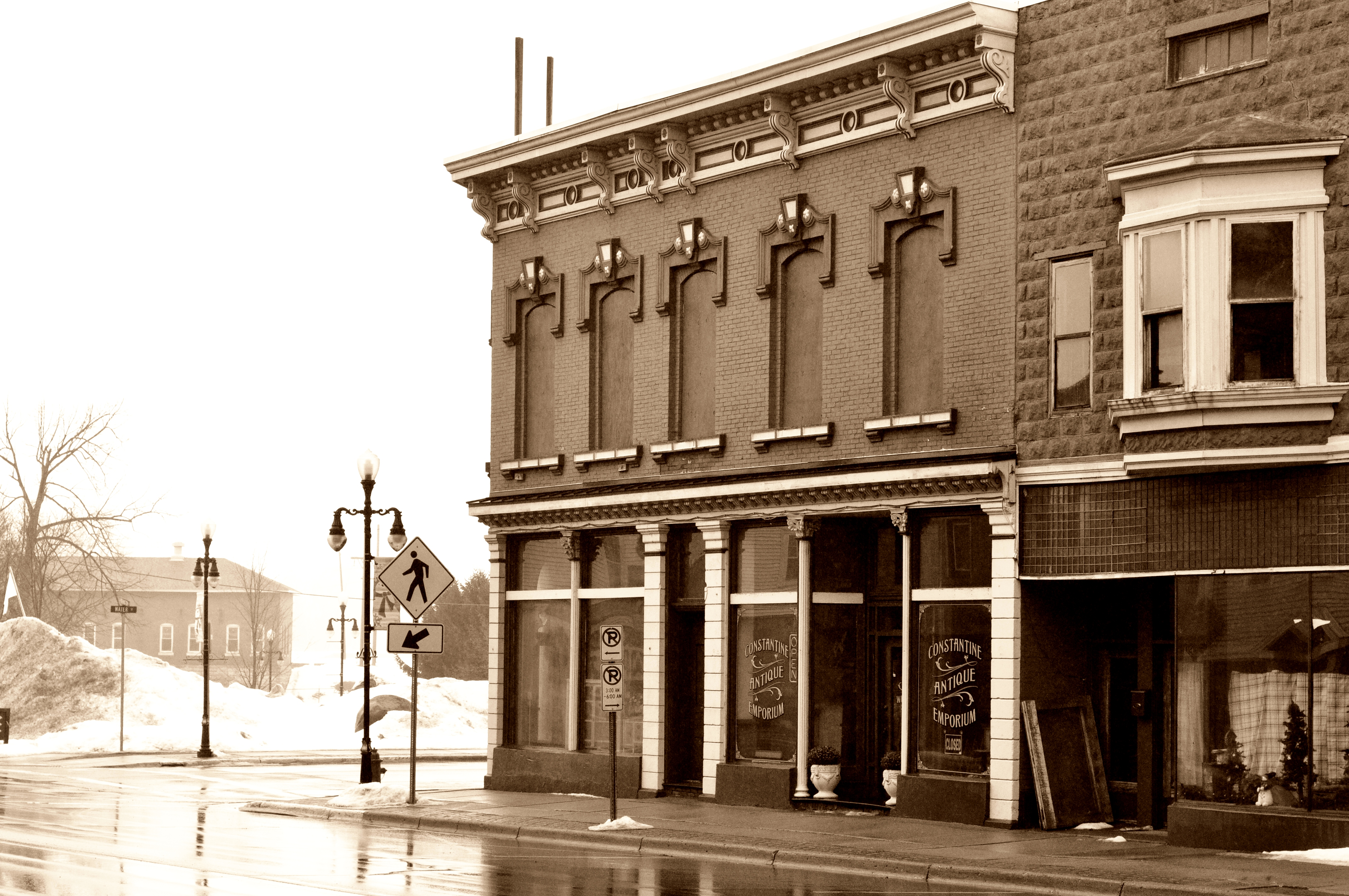
Constantine, MI, USA.

According to the United States Census Bureau, the village has a total area of 1.77 square miles (4.58 km^{2}), of which 1.61 square miles (4.17 km^{2}) is land and 0.16 square miles (0.41 km^{2}) is water.

== Demographics ==
Historical population
Census	Pop.	Note	%±
1850	760		—
1860	879		15.7%
1870	1,290		46.8%
1880	1,405		8.9%
1890	1,346		−4.2%
1900	1,226		−8.9%
1910	1,244		1.5%
1920	1,277		2.7%
1930	1,259		−1.4%
1940	1,384		9.9%
1950	1,514		9.4%
1960	1,710		12.9%
1970	1,733		1.3%
1980	1,680		−3.1%
1990	2,032		21.0%
2000	2,095		3.1%
2010	2,076		−0.9%
2020	1,947		−6.2%
U.S. Decennial Census

=== 2020 census ===
As of the 2020 census, Constantine had a population of 1,947. The median age was 34.7 years. 29.5% of residents were under the age of 18 and 11.0% of residents were 65 years of age or older. For every 100 females there were 96.7 males, and for every 100 females age 18 and over there were 95.4 males age 18 and over.

0.0% of residents lived in urban areas, while 100.0% lived in rural areas.

There were 744 households in Constantine, of which 37.4% had children under the age of 18 living in them. Of all households, 43.4% were married-couple households, 19.2% were households with a male householder and no spouse or partner present, and 28.0% were households with a female householder and no spouse or partner present. About 25.0% of all households were made up of individuals and 9.2% had someone living alone who was 65 years of age or older.

There were 799 housing units, of which 6.9% were vacant. The homeowner vacancy rate was 1.5% and the rental vacancy rate was 5.7%.

Racial composition as of the 2020 census
Race	Number	Percent
White	1,705	87.6%
Black or African American	18	0.9%
American Indian and Alaska Native	8	0.4%
Asian	11	0.6%
Native Hawaiian and Other Pacific Islander	0	0.0%
Some other race	90	4.6%
Two or more races	115	5.9%
Hispanic or Latino (of any race)	156	8.0%

=== 2010 census ===
As of the census of 2010, there were 2,076 people, 728 households, and 522 families living in the village. The population density was 1,289.4 inhabitants per square mile (497.8/km^{2}). There were 829 housing units at an average density of 514.9 per square mile (198.8/km^{2}). The racial makeup of the village was 91.5% White, 1.8% African American, 0.9% Native American, 0.5% Asian, 2.4% from other races, and 3.0% from two or more races. Hispanic or Latino of any race were 3.3% of the population.

There were 728 households, of which 45.1% had children under the age of 18 living with them, 47.5% were married couples living together, 18.8% had a female householder with no husband present, 5.4% had a male householder with no wife present, and 28.3% were non-families. 22.7% of all households were made up of individuals, and 7.7% had someone living alone who was 65 years of age or older. The average household size was 2.85 and the average family size was 3.27.

The median age in the village was 31.2 years. 31.6% of residents were under the age of 18; 9.3% were between the ages of 18 and 24; 28.2% were from 25 to 44; 22% were from 45 to 64; and 8.9% were 65 years of age or older. The gender makeup of the village was 49.2% male and 50.8% female.

=== 2000 census ===
As of the census of 2000, there were 2,095 people, 763 households, and 557 families living in the village. The population density was 1,291.9 inhabitants per square mile (498.8/km^{2}). There were 836 housing units at an average density of 515.5 per square mile (199.0/km^{2}). The racial makeup of the village was 95.42% White, 0.62% African American, 0.14% Native American, 0.86% Asian, 0.48% from other races, and 2.48% from two or more races. Hispanic or Latino of any race were 1.43% of the population.

There were 763 households, out of which 43.5% had children under the age of 18 living with them, 49.9% were married couples living together, 15.2% had a female householder with no husband present, and 26.9% were non-families. 22.5% of all households were made up of individuals, and 11.0% had someone living alone who was 65 years of age or older. The average household size was 2.75 and the average family size was 3.12.

In the village, the population was spread out, with 32.0% under the age of 18, 9.9% from 18 to 24, 29.7% from 25 to 44, 18.1% from 45 to 64, and 10.3% who were 65 years of age or older. The median age was 30 years. For every 100 females, there were 96.5 males. For every 100 females age 18 and over, there were 91.4 males.

The median income for a household in the village was $40,428, and the median income for a family was $44,236. Males had a median income of $35,469 versus $23,152 for females. The per capita income for the village was $15,542. About 14.1% of families and 15.5% of the population were below the poverty line, including 20.9% of those under age 18 and 8.2% of those age 65 or over.

== Arts and culture ==
=== Tourism ===
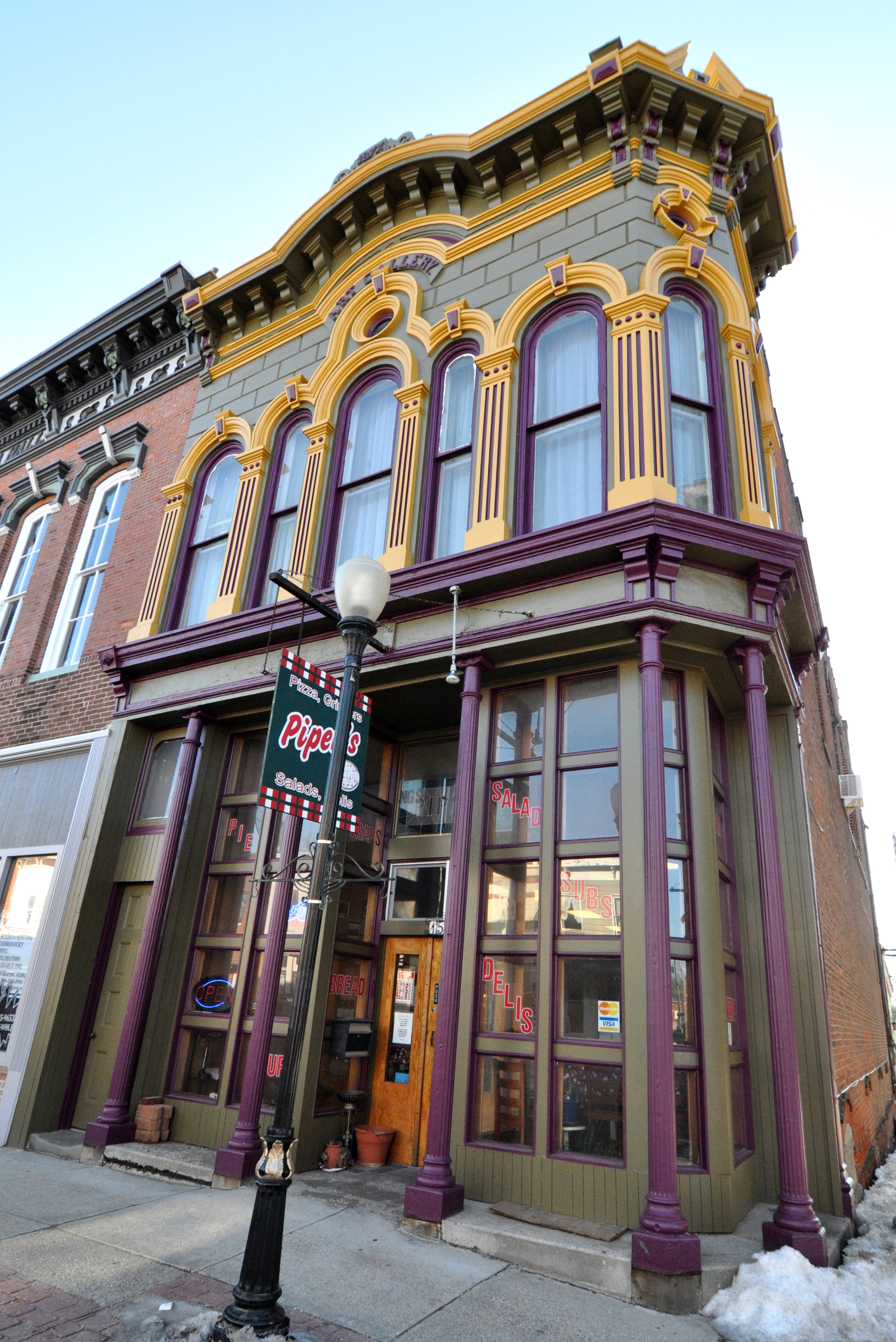
Old pharmacy built in 1877, Constantine, MI, USA.

John S. Barry, the fourth and eighth governor of Michigan resided in Constantine. Barry's home, the Governor John S. Barry House, is on the National Register of Historic Places since 1972.

== Fire department ==
The Constantine fire department was founded in 1883. Currently the fire department is a combination fire department. The fire department provides firefighting service along with medical first responder (MFR) services to the village and township of Constantine as well as the western half of Florence township. The department is also called station 4. This is because of the fire department numbering system in Saint Joseph county making them station #4.

=== Staffing ===
Monday through Friday from 8am to 5pm the station is staffed with a single firefighter to respond to calls. When the station is not staffed paid on-call firefighters staff the department from home. There are currently 16 firefighters on the department of that 1 is part time, 2 are part time / paid on call, and the rest are paid on-call firefighters.

=== Apparatus ===
The fire department currently has seven apparatus.

Engine 411 - This is a 3000-gallon pumper tanker that is used for structural fires. It was needs this large amount of water due to the lack of hydrants within the townships.

Engine 421 - Is a 1000-gallon rescue pumper. It is used for car accidents mostly and provides a second out pumper.

Tanker 416 - The tanker hold 3000 gallons of water and a small pump. Owing to the townships having no hydrants, it is a needed piece of equipment as structure fires need large volumes of water.

Brush 415 and 425 - With a large majority of the fire departments coverage area being rural also including the Three Rivers state game area wild land fires our a common occurrence. This requires the need of a 4x4 vehicle that can gain access to the woods and fields to extinguish the fires. Both of these units are based on pick up trucks and carry 250 gallons of water. They are both lifted and have 4 wheel drive to allow access to normally inaccessible areas for the larger fire trucks.

Rescue 413 - This truck is the main truck for physical type rescues. It is a rolling tool box. Its most common response is to car accidents as the unit carries the Jaws of Life.

Rescue 423 - This unit is used for medical responses. The truck is the most used in the department as medical type calls are the largest percentage of the call base. This unit responds along with an ambulance. As no ambulance is based in Constantine the fire department can normal be on scene long before an ambulance can be and start to provide aid to a sick or injured person. This truck also carries ice rescue equipment.

== Education ==
Public education is provided by the Constantine Public Schools.

== Notable people ==
- Harry Hill Bandholtz, US brigadier general in World War I and head of the US Military Mission to Hungary, was born here.
- John S. Barry (1802–1870), fourth and eighth governor of Michigan
- Elisha Newton Dimick (1849–1919), Florida legislator and first mayor of Palm Beach, Florida, born in Constantine.
- Edwin W. Keightley (1843–1926), U.S. representative from Michigan
- George J. Sweetland (1872–1954) physician, athletic administrator and college coach
- Joseph R. Williams (1808–1861), first President of Michigan Agricultural College, later to become Michigan State University. He was also the 14th Lt. Governor of Michigan in 1861.
