= Sturgis Dam =

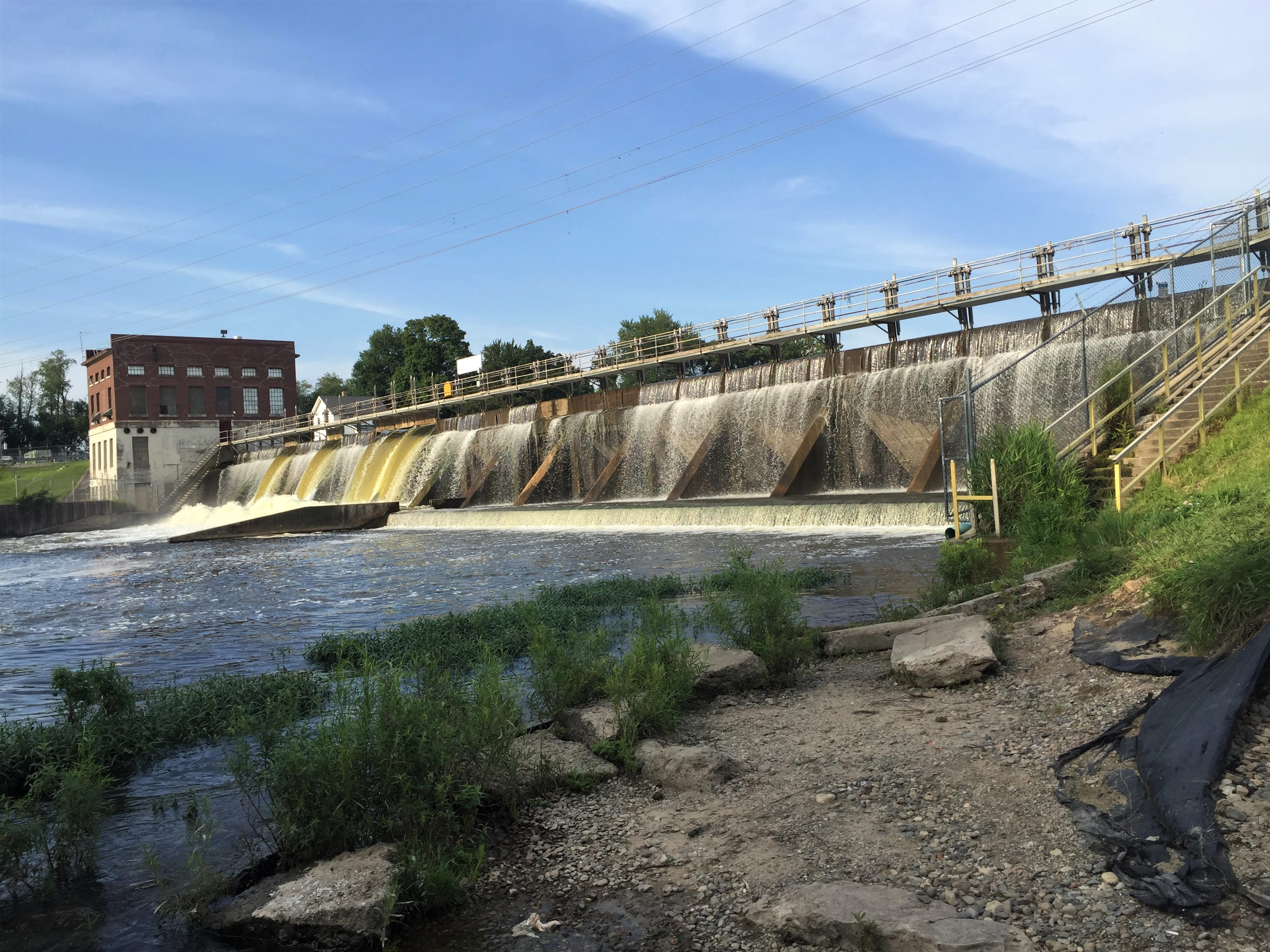
- Interactive map of Sturgis Dam
- Official name: Sturgis Dam
- Country: United States
- Location: Lockport Township, St. Joseph County, Michigan; Near Centreville, Michigan
- Coordinates: 41.969905°N 85.538569°W
- Purpose: Power
- Status: Operational
- Construction began: 1909
- Opening date: 1911
- Construction cost: $190,000
- Owner: Sturgis, Michigan

Dam and spillways
- Type of dam: Embankment, earth-fill
- Impounds: St. Joseph River
- Height: 24 ft (7 m)
- Length: 308 ft (94 m)
- Width (crest): 22 ft (7 m)
- Width (base): 800 ft (244 m)

Reservoir
- Creates: Sturgis Reservoir

Power Station
- Operator: City of Sturgis
- Commission date: 1909
- Turbines: 2 x 550kw Allis-Chalmers Vertical Shaft Units, 2 x 750kw Allis-Chalmers Horizontal Tube Units

Sturgis Dam is a dam with a hydroelectric power station on the St. Joseph River in Michigan.

== Background ==
The Sturgis Dam was the first municipal water power plant built in Michigan. It is currently named after the city who owns it and paid for its construction. The dam is about 17 miles (27 km) away from the city of Sturgis which owns and operates the plant. The citizens of Sturgis passed a bond for a cost of $190,000 (equivalent to $4.73 million in 2024) for the construction of the dam by a vote of 779 to 47. Construction for the dam started in 1909 and the dam started producing power on September 3, 1911. Today the plant produces less than 4% of the city's electrical needs. It has been estimated that the city's operation of the plant has saved the city $56.6 million by reducing or eliminating the need to buy power from Indiana Michigan Power.

== History ==
When the dam was being voted on local municipalities had just been given the right to use eminent domain for construction of projects like this. However, the use of eminent domain was not used to secure the necessary right. At the time there were no other dams upstream of the Sturgis Dam. The original design of the dam had four floors in the powerhouse. When first constructed, there was the 2,300-volt oil switches and 23,000-volt lightning arresters on the switchroom floor. The lowest floor held six 200-kW oil-cooled transformers. The original transmission line out was a 17-mile (27 km) three-phase line of No. 4 B & S hard drawn copper. The bond that was approved was for $175,000 however the cost came to $250,000. When the dam was constructed it caused the Langley Covered Bridge to be raised eight feet (2.4 m).

The general contractor for the spillway and powerhouse was Carpenter & Anderson of Allis-Chalmers. The entire engineering work including preliminary surveys, and estimates was under the supervision of Gardner S. Williams of M. Am. Soc. C.E. Consulting engineer.

In 1930s the St. Joseph County Fish and Game Commission built two fish hatching ponds to stock the river. However, those ponds are now gone and overgrown.

In 1982 a second powerhouse was added with two Allis-Chalmers horizontal tube units.

During the 2011 Dam Days celebration a large boulder and plaque were placed on the grounds recognizing the dams centennial year of operation.

== Operation ==
This hydro-electric dam is capable of producing 2,600 kilowatts. The original two Allis-Chalmers Vertical Shaft units produce 550 kilowatts each for a total of 1,100 kilowatts. The 1982 second powerhouse and two new units allow for an additional 750 kilowatts each, providing another 1,500 kilowatts. There are 33 gates that hold back the St. Joseph River and creating the Sturgis Reservoir.

In July 2016, the City of Sturgis notified residents and land owners along the river that would be doing an emergency drawdown of the Sturgis Reservoir to make emergency repairs to the earth embankment of the dam. To perform the repairs the reservoir was drawn down three feet (0.91 m). The emergency drawdown of the reservoir in the middle of a heat wave caused concern from local farms that irrigation intakes were now left above the water line of the river.

== See also ==
- List of dams and reservoirs in Michigan
