= Langley Covered Bridge =

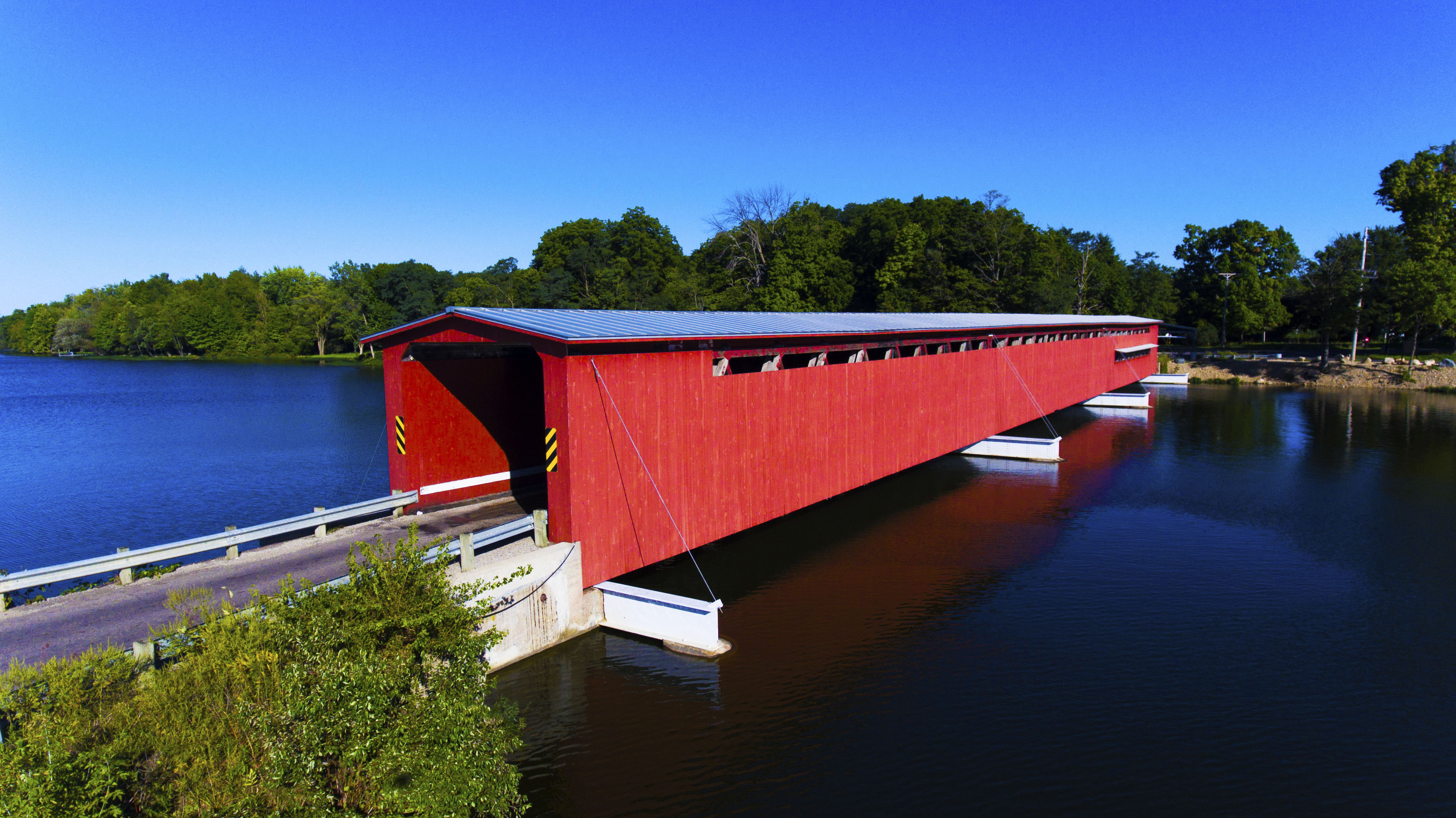
- Langley Covered Bridge—September 2016
- Coordinates: 41°58′02″N 085°31′41″W
- Carries: Covered Bridge Road
- Crosses: St. Joseph River
- Locale: Centreville, Michigan
- Maintained by: St. Joseph County Road Commission

Characteristics
- Design: Howe truss
- Total length: 282 ft (86 m)
- No. of spans: 3
- Load limit: 3 short tons (2.7 t)
- Clearance above: 7 ft (2.1 m)

History
- Construction end: 1887

Michigan State Historic Site
- Designated: August 31, 1965

Location
- Interactive map of Langley Covered Bridge

Langley Covered Bridge is the longest remaining wooden covered bridge in the U.S. state of Michigan. It is located in Lockport Township, three miles north of Centreville, the seat of St. Joseph County. The road to get to the bridge borders on the east line of Lockport and Nottawa townships. The bridge crosses the St. Joseph River. The current bridge and causeway opened in 1887. The bridge and causeway make up Covered Bridge Road.

== History ==
The bridge is not the first bridge to span this section of the St. Joseph River. In 1887 a swollen St. Joseph River swept away a bridge that was about two blocks from the current bridge location. The current bridge was constructed in 1887 by nearby Parkville builder Pierce Bodmer. Both Lockport and Nottawa Township commissioned the bridge which cost about $3,000. The bridge is named for Thomas W. Langley and family, pioneers who helped establish the village of Centreville in the mid-19th century. Langley was the very first settler in Centreville.

=== Restoration work ===
In the 1940s, as motor vehicle traffic started to replace the horse and buggy and foot traffic, the added weight and vibration began causing damage to the bridge and abutments and required repair. "The road commission was flooded with requests from all parts of the state and surrounding states to do everything possible to keep the covered bridge intact." The Elkhart Bridge and Iron Works was awarded the contract to fix the bridge. The 1950-51 project was to give the bridge a new under structure at a cost of $35,885. In September 1950 the bridge was closed to traffic so work could begin and did not reopen till August 1951. During the closure "All the load carrying elements of the bridge were changed from wood to steel or concrete. The old flooring was replaced with two by fours creosoted."

When the bridge was again in need of major repair, the St. Joseph County Road Commission hired Anlaan Corporation to perform the restoration work. All of the siding was removed from the bridge and the roof was replaced. The asphalt that had been added to road decking was removed and returned to wood planking. The cost of the 2008-09 repair was almost $1 million. During this Restoration project two Height Restrictor portal frames and signs were added.

In 2023, St. Joseph County planned to replace all the steel underpinnings of the bridge. The bridge reopened to traffic on Jan. 12, 2024.

=== Replacement ===
In 1964 the bridge became the center of controversy when the then county road official wanted to widen the road between Centreville and Vicksburg.

== Tourism ==
Many of the covered bridges in Michigan and other states no longer exist, and the Langley Covered Bridge is consequently considered a historic site and tourist attraction. For almost 130 years the covered bridge has been a scenic point for travelers, and for artists and photographers hoping to capture the changing shadows of the bridge. The bridge draws history and bridge buffs to see the longest covered bridge in Michigan. People also come to fish from inside the bridge.

== Facts and figures ==
The bridge spans 282 feet (86 m) across the river, it is made up of three spans and is made of the Howe truss construction. Its frame and timbers are constructed of White pine. The original bridge section are made from three 94-foot (29 m) sections which are joined together to form the 282-foot (86 m) length of the bridge. They measure 19 feet (5.8 m) wide by 16 feet (4.9 m) high. The original bridge's planking and decking rests on 40 beams that measure 8 inches (20 cm) by 12 inches (30 cm) by 19 feet (5.8 m) long. It is estimated on average that 1,700 vehicles a day use the bridge. During the 2008–09 project on the bridge, two Height Restrictor portal frames and signs were add at the cost of $20,000 each for a total $40,000 to help protect the bridge.

When the Sturgis Dam was installed the bridge had to be raised eight feet (two point four metres). In a two-year period, 1950–51, the St. Joseph County Road commission undertook work to help preserve the bridge for use by future generations. To accomplish this the old foundation timbers had to be replaced by wood reinforced with steel beams. The cost of the repair was almost $36,000 (equivalent to $357000 in 2025).

There are three main restrictions on the bridge. There is a three-short-ton (two-point-seven-tonne) weight limitation, a seven-foot (2.1 m) height restriction, and there is a limit on how wide vehicles can be. There are many warning signs leading up to the bridge to warn of the restrictions. The Saint Joseph County Road Commission has attempted some creative ways to stop people from damaging the bridge. Despite the signs, people have hit the metal sign and damaged it beyond repair in 2016. The sign was replaced.

== Other events ==
The bridge has been a symbol of the village of Centreville for a century. Since 1975 the village's annual summer festival has been called Covered Bridge Days. A local newspaper that operated in 1960 used the sketch of the bridge as its logo at different times.

The Three Rivers Chamber of Commerce hosted what was billed a once-in-a-lifetime event, in which the bridge was closed to host a charity dinner. The event was done in coordination with the county road commission that had some planned deck work on the bridge.

== Photo gallery ==
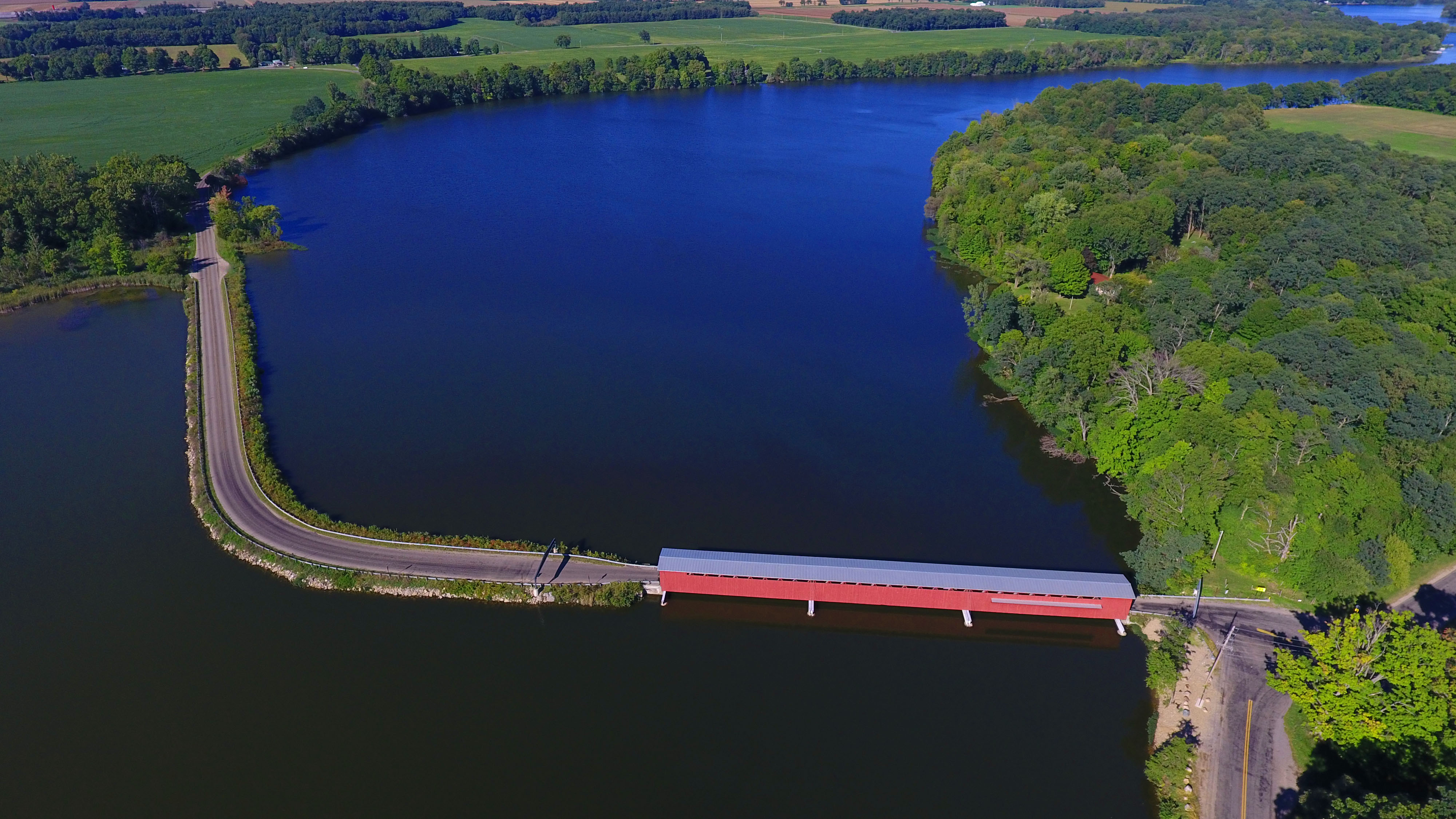
Aerial photo taken from drone

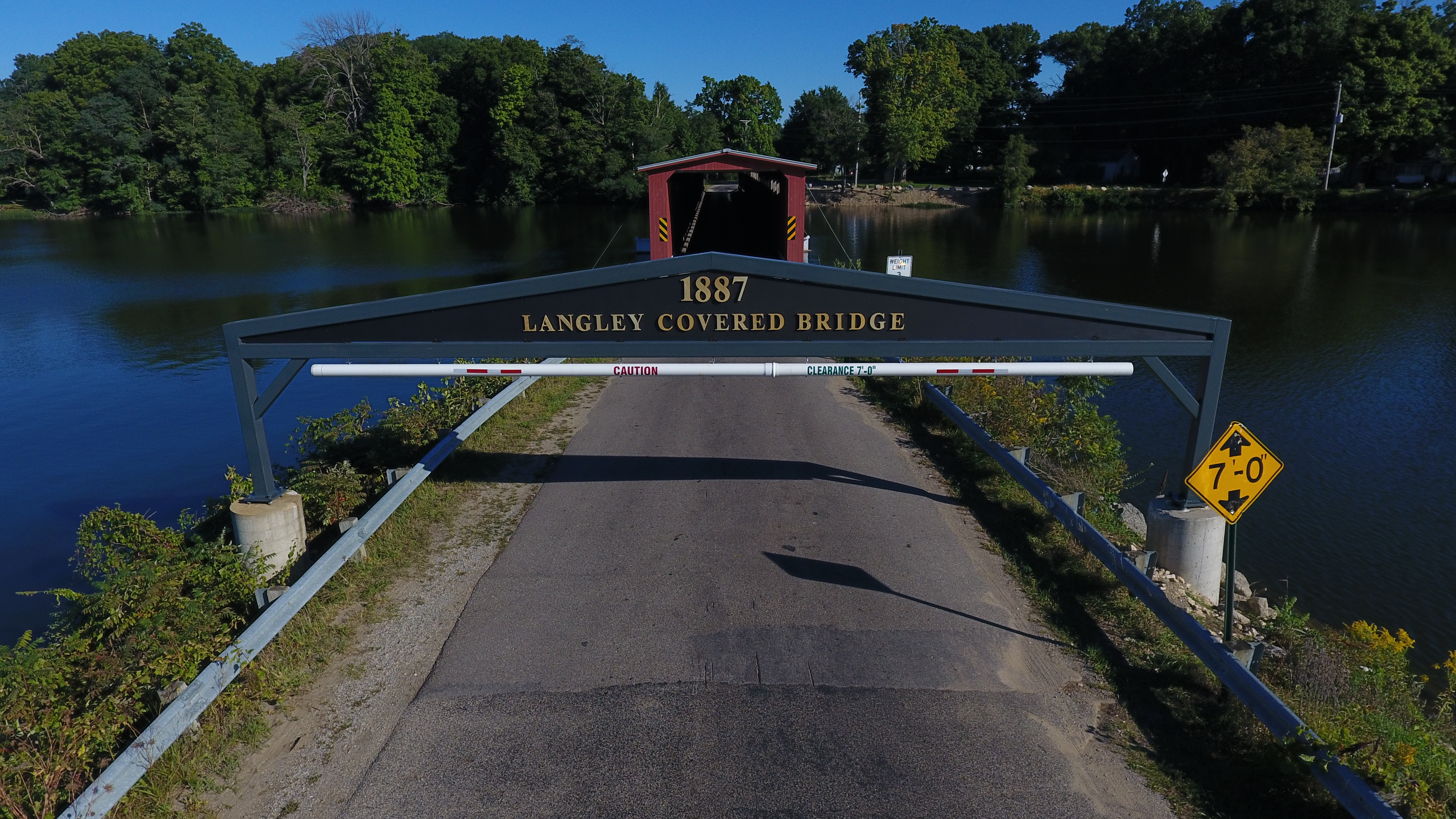
Aerial photo taken from drone of sign protecting bridge from oversize vehicles

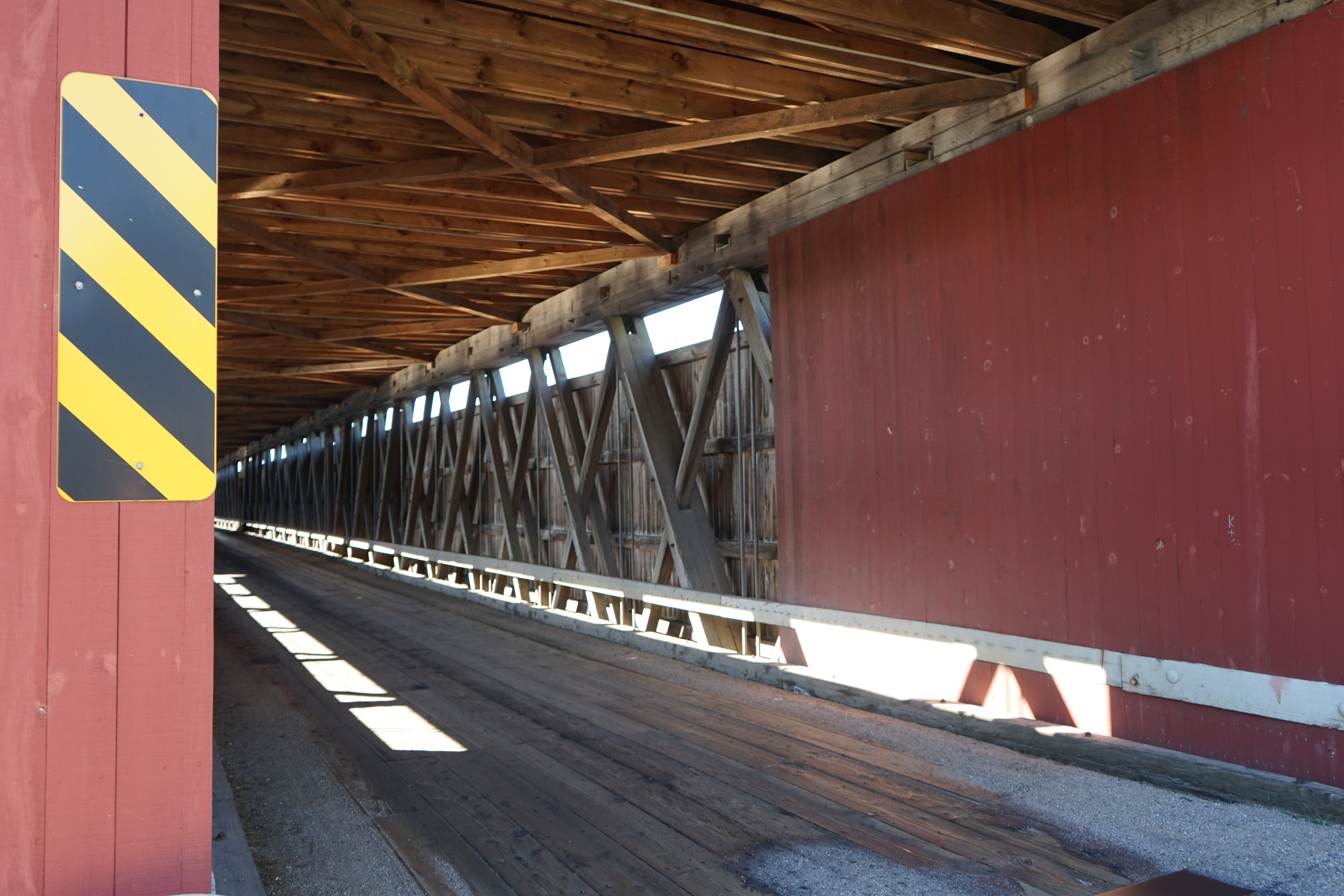
A picture showing the inside of the covered bridge from an angle to show decking and road bed

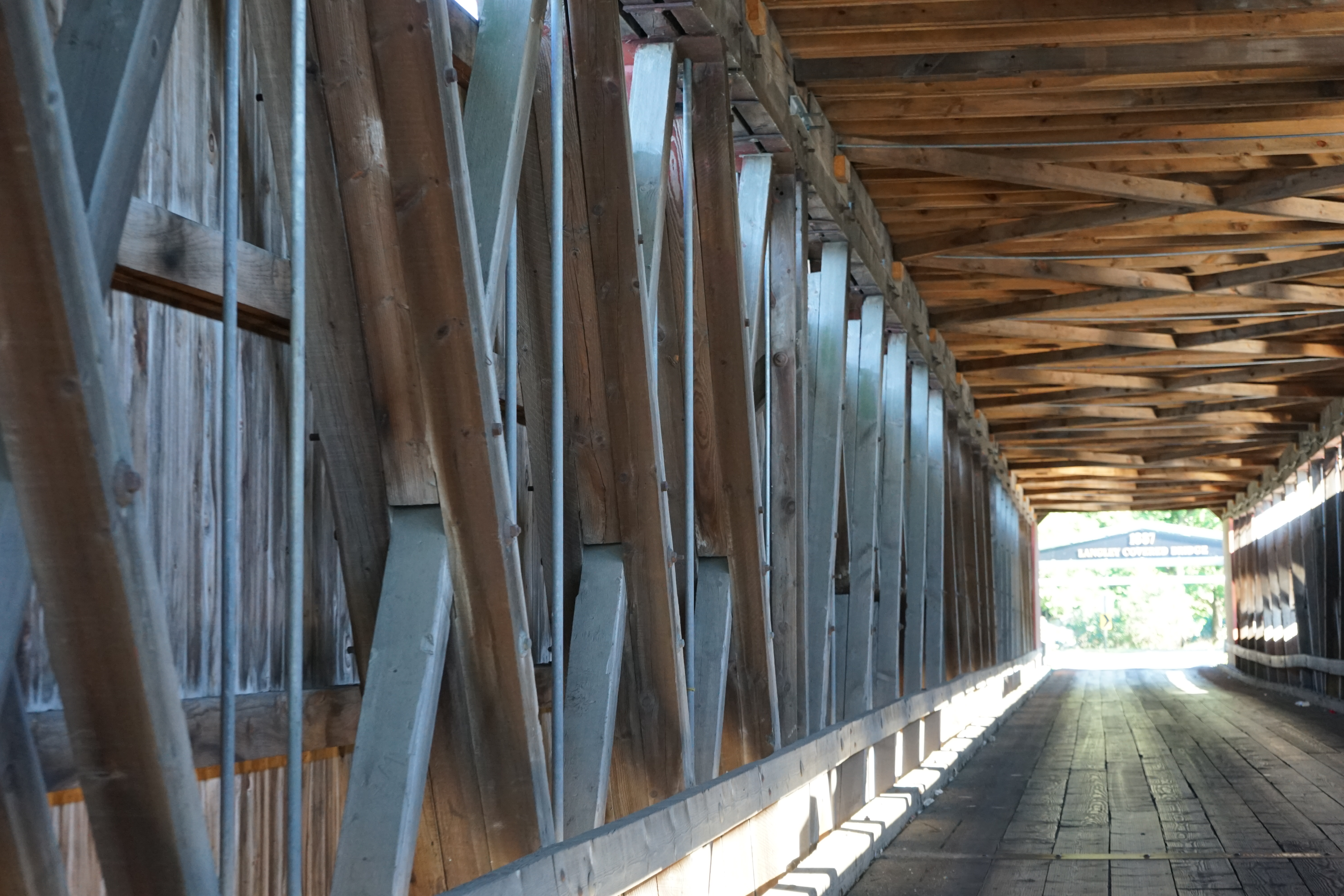
A view of the Howe Truss System spanning the 282 feet (86 m) of the bridge

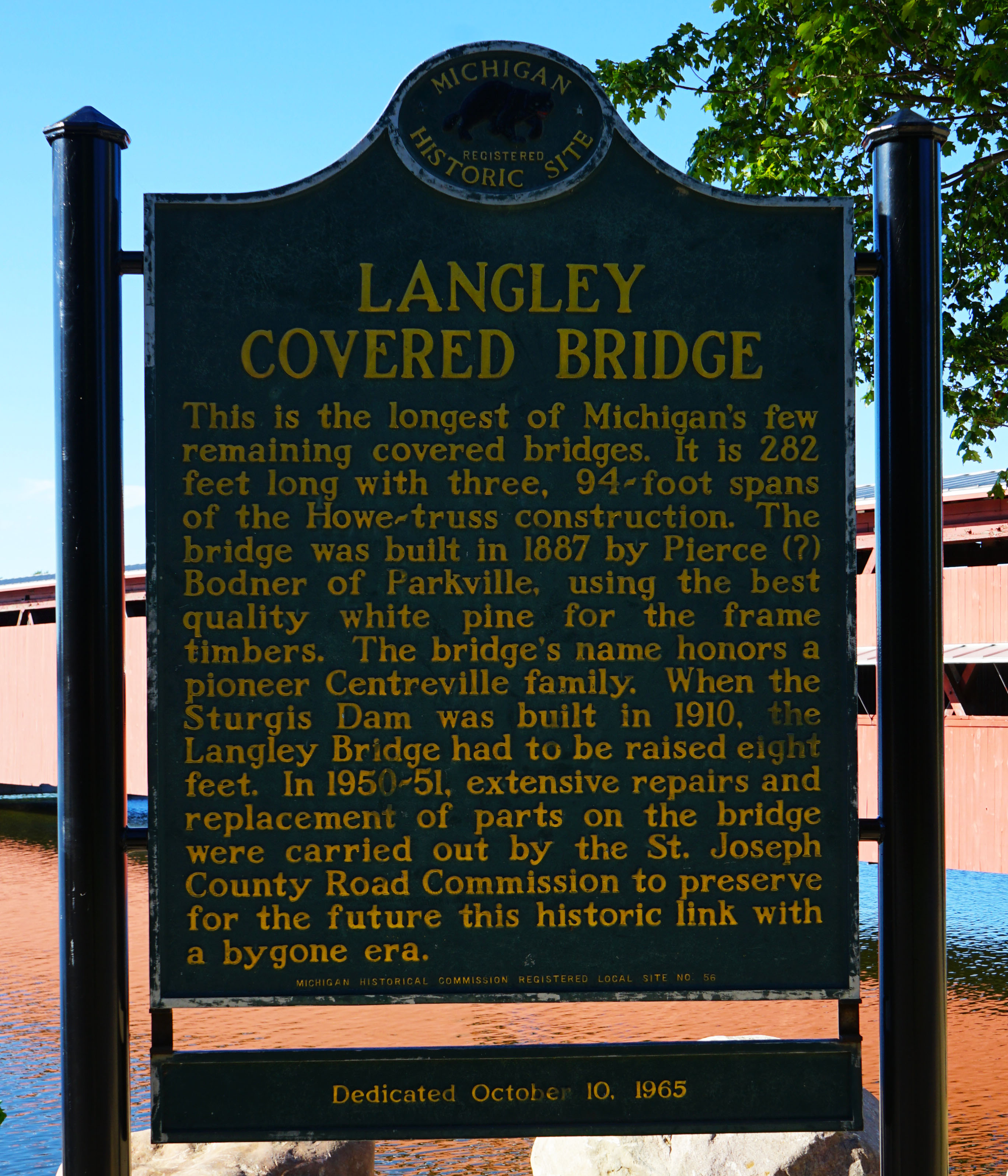
A photo of the Michigan Historical Marker placed on the bridge
