= La Salle Street Bridge =

La Salle Street Bridge may refer to:

- La Salle Street Bridge (Chicago)
- La Salle Street Bridge (South Bend, Indiana), a site on the U.S. National Register of Historic Places
