= Horatio Chapin House =

Historic house in Indiana, United States

- U.S. National Register of Historic Places
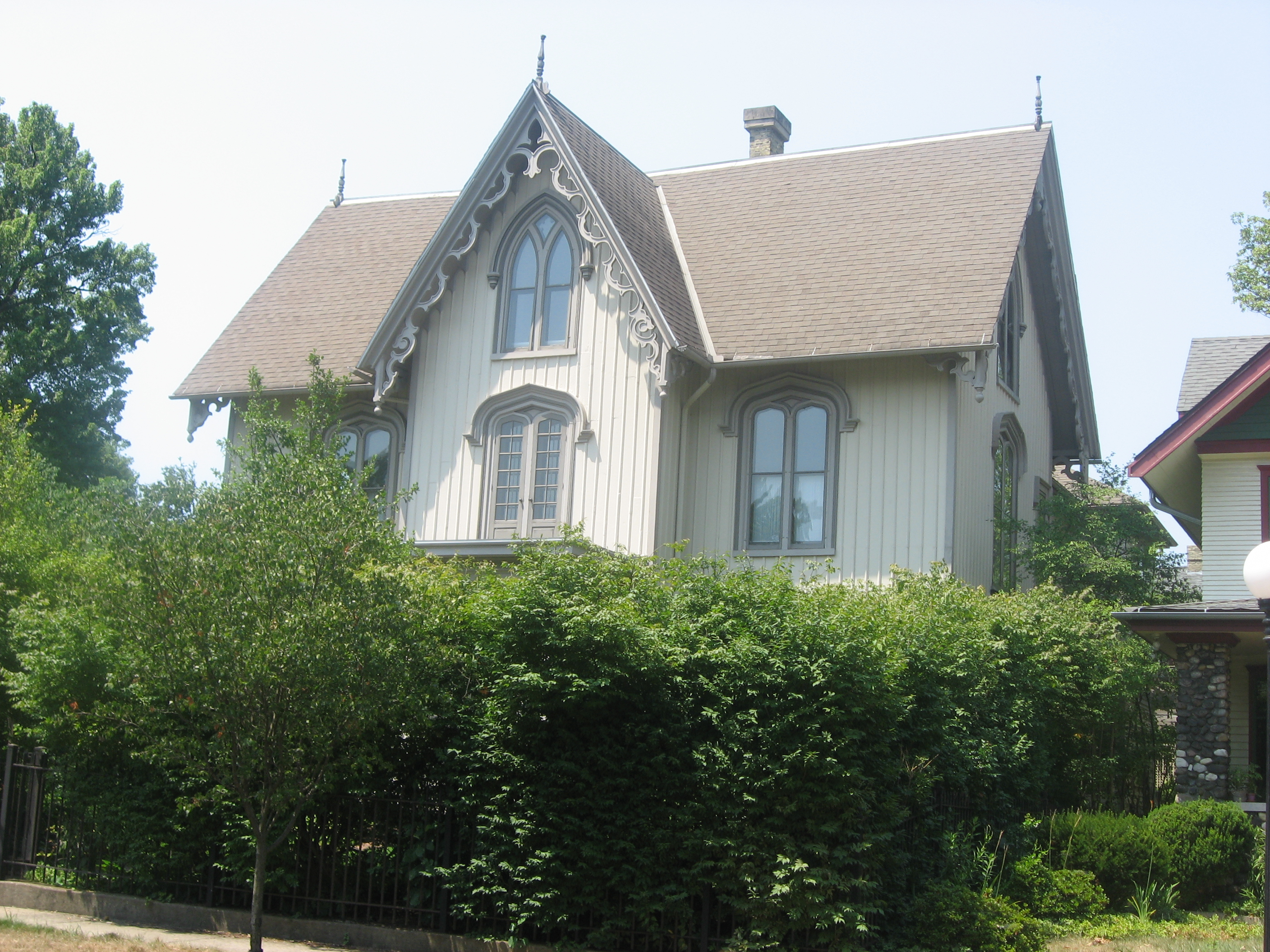
- Horatio Chapin House, July 2012

- Location within Indiana Location within the United States
- Location: 601 Park Ave., South Bend, Indiana
- Coordinates: 41°41′0″N 86°15′19″W
- Area: less than one acre
- Built: 1857
- Built by: Chapin, Horatio
- Architectural style: Gothic Revival
- NRHP reference No.: 80000064
- Added to NRHP: August 11, 1980

The Horatio Chapin House, or simply, the Chapin House, is a historic home located at South Bend, Indiana. It was built between 1855 and 1857 by Horatio Chapin, one of the early settlers of South Bend and the first president of the board of town trustees. The house consists of a 2 1/2-story, cross-plan, Gothic Revival style frame dwelling, a rare example of its kind in the region. It's considered an outstanding example of Gothic Revival architecture influenced by architect Andrew Jackson Downing. It is sheathed in board and batten siding and features lancet windows and a steeply pitched cross-gable roof with an elaborately carved bargeboard. The Chapin House is widely recognized as one of the most significant homes in the state of Indiana, and in 1980 it was listed on the National Register of Historic Places.

Horatio Chapin was an American pioneer and a pioneer settler of South Bend, Indiana. A native of Massachusetts, his family moved to Detroit, Michigan in 1822. In 1831, Chapin travelled by pony along Native American trails to reach a trading post known then simply as the "south bend" in the St. Joseph River of northern Indiana. He set up the first general store of the region, and also helped establish the first church and Sunday school for residents. With the incorporation of the town of South Bend in 1835, he became the first president of the board of town trustees. A businessman and later banker in both South Bend and Chicago, Chapin became one of the wealthier members of the town. In 1855, he began to develop an estate just north of the city center, which eventually developed into the Chapin Park National Historic District, where his imposing Gothic Revival mansion, now known as the Horatio Chapin House, is located. In 1867 Chapin served as the founding president of the St Joseph County Historical Society.

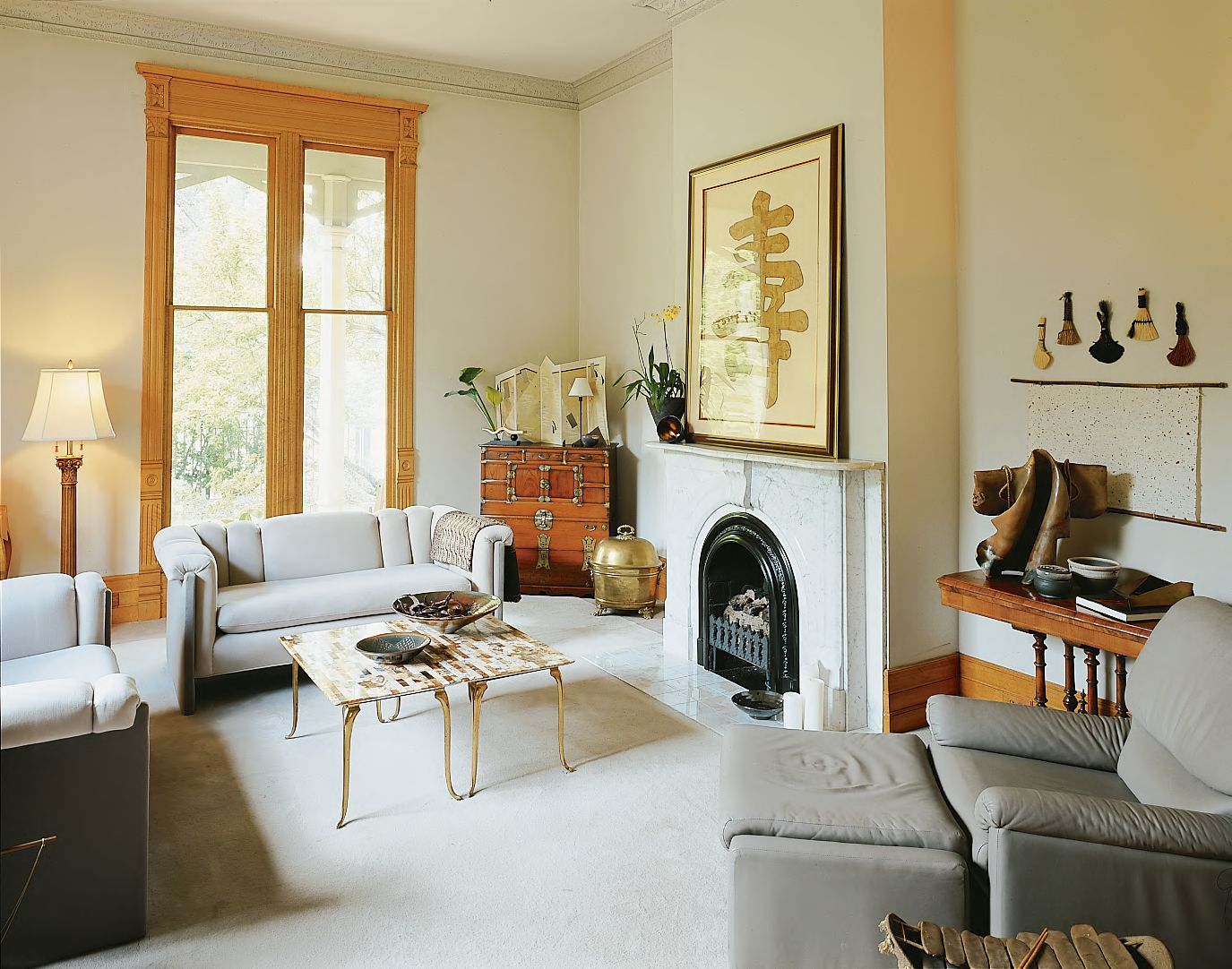
Horatio Chapin House Interior in 2000

At the time of construction, the Chapin House was located just outside the city on land that became known as Chapin's Park or Chapin's Grove. The estate extended from present-day Navarre street to the St Joseph River. Chapin had lived in the house only five years when, in 1862, he moved to Chicago to become a manager of the private banking house of Chapin, Wheeler & Company. He retired two years later, then returned to his Gothic residence in South Bend, where he lived until his death in 1871. Following Chapin's death, the property was divided between two children along the estate's old carriage road, which became Park Avenue. Chapin's children further divided their respective properties, contributing to the development of a neighborhood along Park Avenue. In 1888, the Chapin House was purchased by a local businessman and building contractor, Christopher Fassnacht. Fassnacht moved the Chapin house a half block to the east and south of its original location, and divided the remaining property of the estate into lots for a neighborhood. When Fassnacht moved the house, he turned it 9O degrees so that the front facade, which originally faced Navarre Street(at that time known as Perry Street), now faced Park Avenue. In addition, he remodeled the house, rebuilt the kitchen wing on the west side, and in 1910, added a glass-enclosed carport. He also added Queen Anne style shingle and clapboard siding on the first level. Fassnacht died in 1936. Today, this neighborhood comprises the core of the Chapin Park Historic District. Several homes in the district are connected to the Chapin House, including three homes built by relatives of Horatio Chapin, as well as two homes built for children of Christopher Fassnacht, all of which are still standing.
