= Bridge Street Bridge (Elkhart, Indiana) =

- U.S. National Register of Historic Places
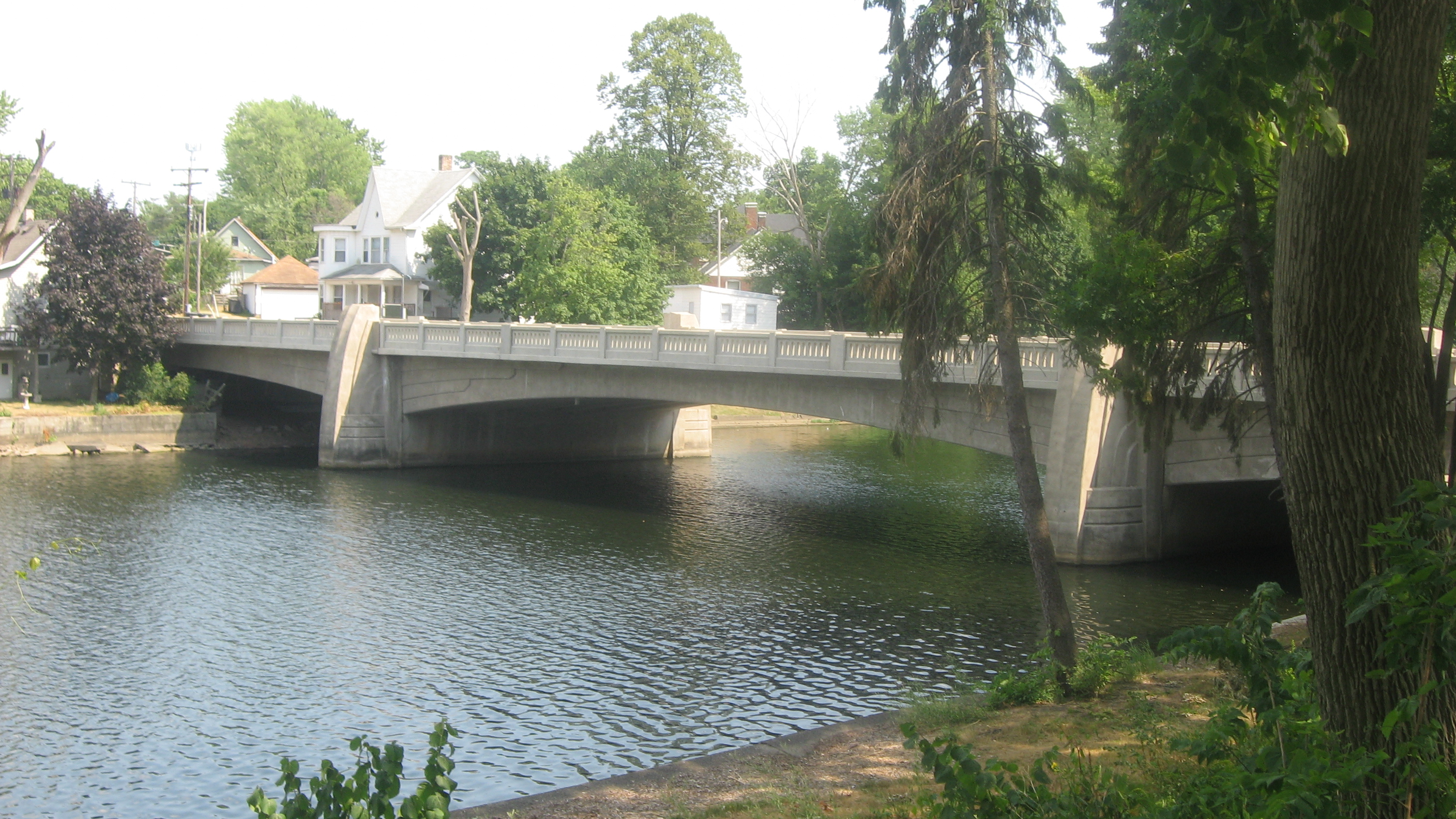
- Bridge Street Bridge, July 2012

- Location within Indiana Location within the United States
- Location: Bridge St. aver St. Joseph R., Elkhart, Indiana
- Coordinates: 41°40′37″N 85°59′27″W
- Area: less than one acre
- Built: 1939
- Built by: Moore, William S.; Maddocks, H.L.
- Architectural style: Reinforced Concrete Beam
- NRHP reference No.: 09000755
- Added to NRHP: September 24, 2009

Bridge Street Bridge, also known as the County Bridge #387, is a historic reinforced concrete bridge located at Elkhart, Indiana. It was built in 1939 and spans the St. Joseph River. The bridge measures 272 feet long and consists of a 116 foot long center span, flanked by 67 foot long spans to the east and west. It measures 52 feet wide, with a 40-foot roadway and 6 foot sidewalks on either side.

It was added to the National Register of Historic Places in 2009.
