= Twin Branch Dam (Indiana) =

- Interactive map of Twin Branch Dam
- Official name: Twin Branch Dam
- Country: United States
- Location: St. Joseph County, Indiana
- Coordinates: 41.665887°N 86.13272°W
- Purpose: Power
- Status: Operational
- Opening date: 1903
- Construction cost: $2,000,000
- Owner: Indiana & Michigan Power Company

Dam and spillways
- Type of dam: Gravity, Timber Crib, Earth
- Impounds: St. Joseph River
- Height: 41 ft (12 m)
- Length: 946 ft (288 m)

Power Station
- Operators: Indiana & Michigan Power Company
- Commission date: 1900

Twin Branch Dam is the tallest dam with a hydroelectric power station on the St. Joseph River in Indiana. When it was first commissioned, it was called the Hen Island Dam. Power was first produced on December 16, 1903.

The name Twin Branch Dam comes from the Twin Branch Creek which empties into the St. Joseph River just above the dam. The prior name for the dam, "Hen Island Dam," came from an island that used to be just below the dam where a riverboat resident used the island to raise geese and chickens. There were two islands, one named "Hen Island" and the other "Goose Island". Both islands were taken by the river by the 1950s.

== Prior dam attempt ==
In 1835 was the first attempt to build a dam on the St. Joseph River near the Twin Branch Dam it was commissioned by the St. Joseph Iron Works. The attempt was abandoned in 1837.

== Planning and legal battle ==
The dam was built by the Sanderson & Porter, company of New York City. The dam was commissioned on February 26, 1900. The company that commissioned the dam was the St. Joseph and Elkhart Power Company. It was incorporated on February 28, 1900, with a first issue of capital stock for $50,000. The company took over the Home Electric Light and Power Company.

They acquired the rights to over a thousand acres of land that would be flooded. Because of the size of the dam and the view that it would impact the planned project upstream by the Indiana Power Company, litigation between the two companies was filed. The case was Indiana Power Company vs. St. Joseph and Elkhart Power Company St. Joseph C.C. The planned project for the Hen Island Dam was successful in the Circuit Court, the Indiana Supreme Court, and the United States Supreme Court refused to hear the case. The legal battle took over two years and was settled between the two companies.

The St. Joseph and Elkhart Power company was also sued by the St. Joseph Navigation Company in Federal Court, seeking an injunction to stop the dam. The case was filed because the dam would block navigation up the river.

The original plan was for the plant to have six alternating three-phase generators of 800 kilowatts each, with thirty large turbine wheels connected in tandem.

== Construction ==
There were 30 arc lights that had been installed to allow construction to take place at night on the project. Over 2.5 million feet of lumber was used to construct the dam. The lumber was used to build cribbing and drive piles 20 feet into the river. There were over 2,000 piles driven into the river bed. They were filled with gravel and stone. The dam when it was built housed four horizontal turbine wheels that measured 51-inch.

In 1922 the dam was in need of repair Indiana & Michigan constructed a concert cover over a steel frame. In the 1922 upgrades the power plant finally got the two new generators to bring the dam's generators to the planned six. In 1957, the dam only generated 7,200 kilowatts of power.

== History ==
When the Hen Island Dam was in the process of being built it was billed as "The Great Dam Now Under Construction at Hen Island is a Stupendous Feat of Engineering. Interesting Legal Battle." In late 1903, the power plant was connected to the Elkhart Power Company and power was first produced while the dam was still under the control of Sanderson & Porter.

In 1904, Charles A Chapin, purchased the interest that South Bend Electric Co had in the dam for over $1,000,000. St. Joseph and Elkhart Power company merged with the Indiana & Michigan company in 1907.

A $3.4 million upgrade was made to the power plant in 1989, with two generators replaced as part of the upgrade. The generators were replaced after a period of nine-years being out of service, one was out of service because of shaft failure, the other was broken down in 1979, performing only at 60% operation.

== Operation ==
This hydro-electric dam is capable of producing 2,600 kilowatts. The dam has been owned and operated by American Electric Power/Indiana Michigan Power since 1922.

== See also ==
- List of dams and reservoirs in Indiana
