= Water Street/Darden Road Bridge =

- U.S. National Register of Historic Places
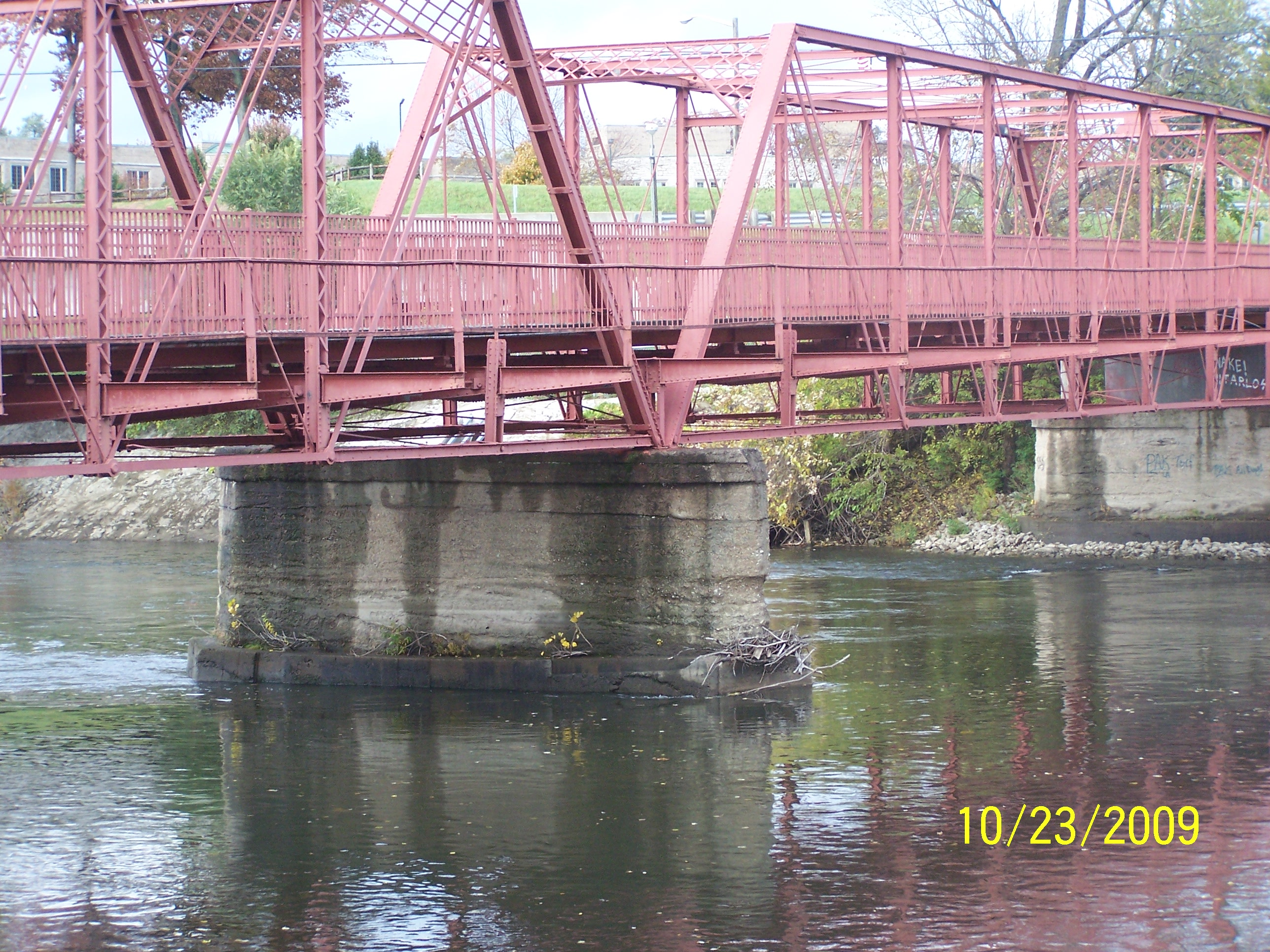
- Darden Bridge, October 2009

- Location within Indiana Location within the United States
- Location: Over the St. Joseph River at Darden Rd., South Bend, Indiana
- Coordinates: 41°43′49″N 86°16′7″W
- Area: less than one acre
- Built: 1885
- Built by: Chicago Bridge & Iron Co.; Lane, P.E.
- Architectural style: Pratt through truss
- NRHP reference No.: 85000599
- Added to NRHP: March 21, 1985

Water Street/Darden Road Bridge is a historic Pratt through truss bridge bridge located in Clay Township, St. Joseph County, Indiana. It was built in 1885 by the Chicago Bridge & Iron Company, and is a double-span steel bridge. It measures 328 feet long and 20 feet wide. It was originally located at Water Street (now LaSalle Street) in nearby South Bend, and moved to its present location in 1906 on Darden Road, where it crosses the St. Joseph River. The bridge has experienced multiple closures since being moved, the last in 1970; it remains closed to vehicular traffic. Darden Road now crosses the river on a bridge opened in 1999. The Water Street/Darden Road Bridge lies along the Darden Road Trail, part of the larger Indiana–Michigan River Valley Trail.

It was listed on the National Register of Historic Places in 1985.
