= French Paper Company =

American paper company

- Industry: Paper Manufacturing
- Founded: 1871
- Founder: J. W. French
- Headquarters: Niles, Michigan
- Area served: North America
- Key people: Shane Fenske
- Products: Uncoated Paper
- Owner: Finch Paper Holdings
- Number of employees: 50-100
- Website: http://www.frenchpaper.com/

French Paper Company is an American paper mill based in Niles, Michigan. It has been family owned since it was founded in 1871. The company produces premium specialty uncoated colored paper, colored envelopes and custom paper for graphic arts, printing, specialty, gifts and more.

The company is located along the St. Joseph River and since 1922 it has sourced its electricity from its own renewable hydroelectric power plant at the Niles, Michigan dam.

French Paper is well known amongst the graphic design industry due largely in part to its long standing relationship with CSA Design and the promotional materials it creates.
