= Fort Miami (Michigan) =

Coordinates: 42°6.655′N 86°28.939′W

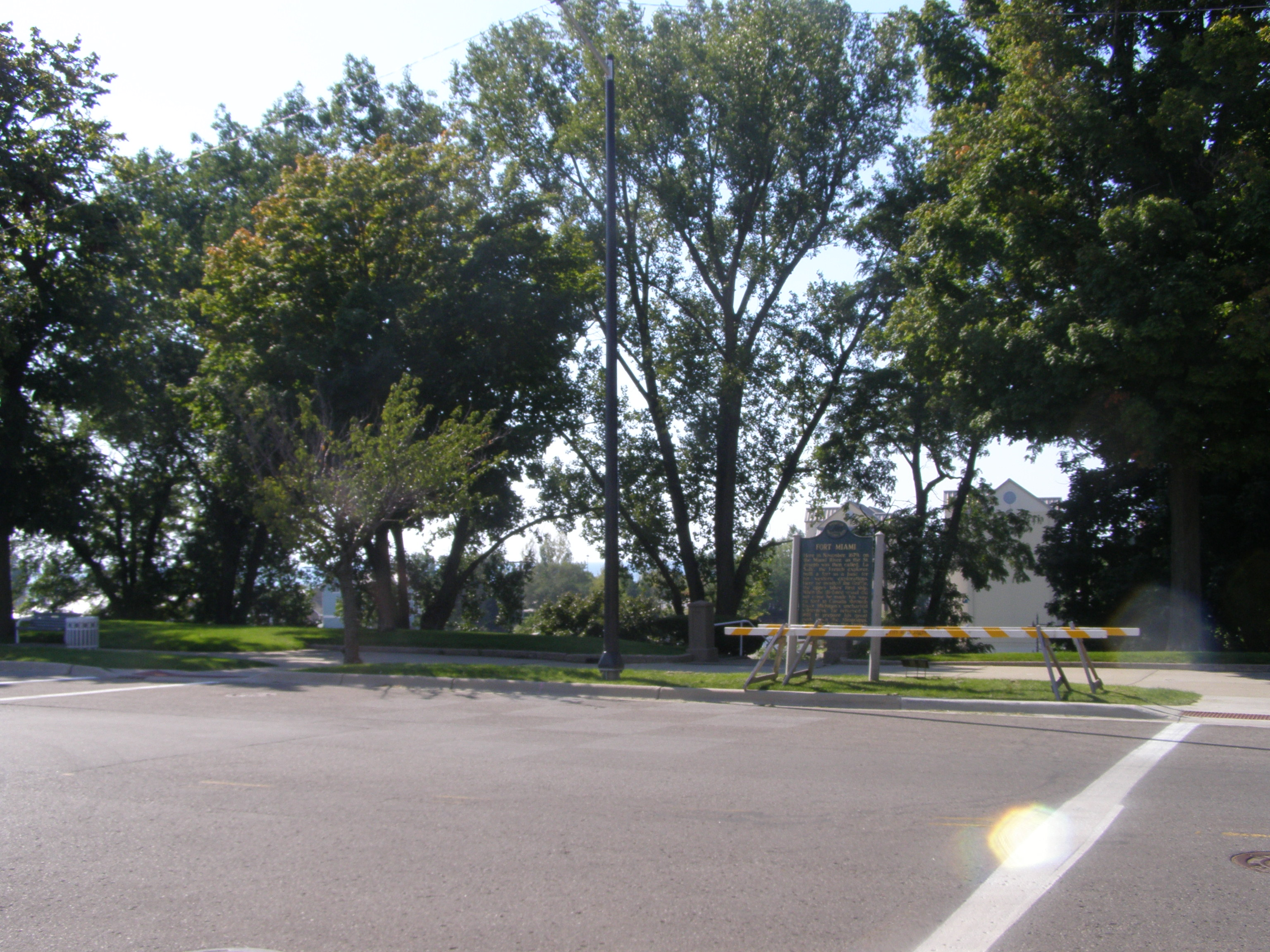

Fort Miami was a fort on the bank of the St. Joseph River at the site of the present-day city of St. Joseph, Michigan, in the United States.

It was established in November 1679 by a band of French explorers led by René Robert Cavelier, Sieur de La Salle on the banks of what was then called the River Miami as a mission and Indian trading outpost. His soldiers destroyed it the next year. It was rebuilt in winter 1680–81.

In 1700, a second fort was erected by a visiting Jesuit mission and remained in French possession until the French and Indian War (1754-1763), at which point it was conquered by the British.

It came under the command of Colonel John, who with a handful of soldiers resisted regular attacks by surrounding indigenous tribes. It fell to a raiding party during Pontiac's Rebellion in 1763 until quickly returning to British rule at the end of the same year.
