= St. Joseph River (Lake Michigan) =

River in Michigan and Indiana, U.S.

Saint Joseph River La Rivière des Miamis (River of the Miamis)
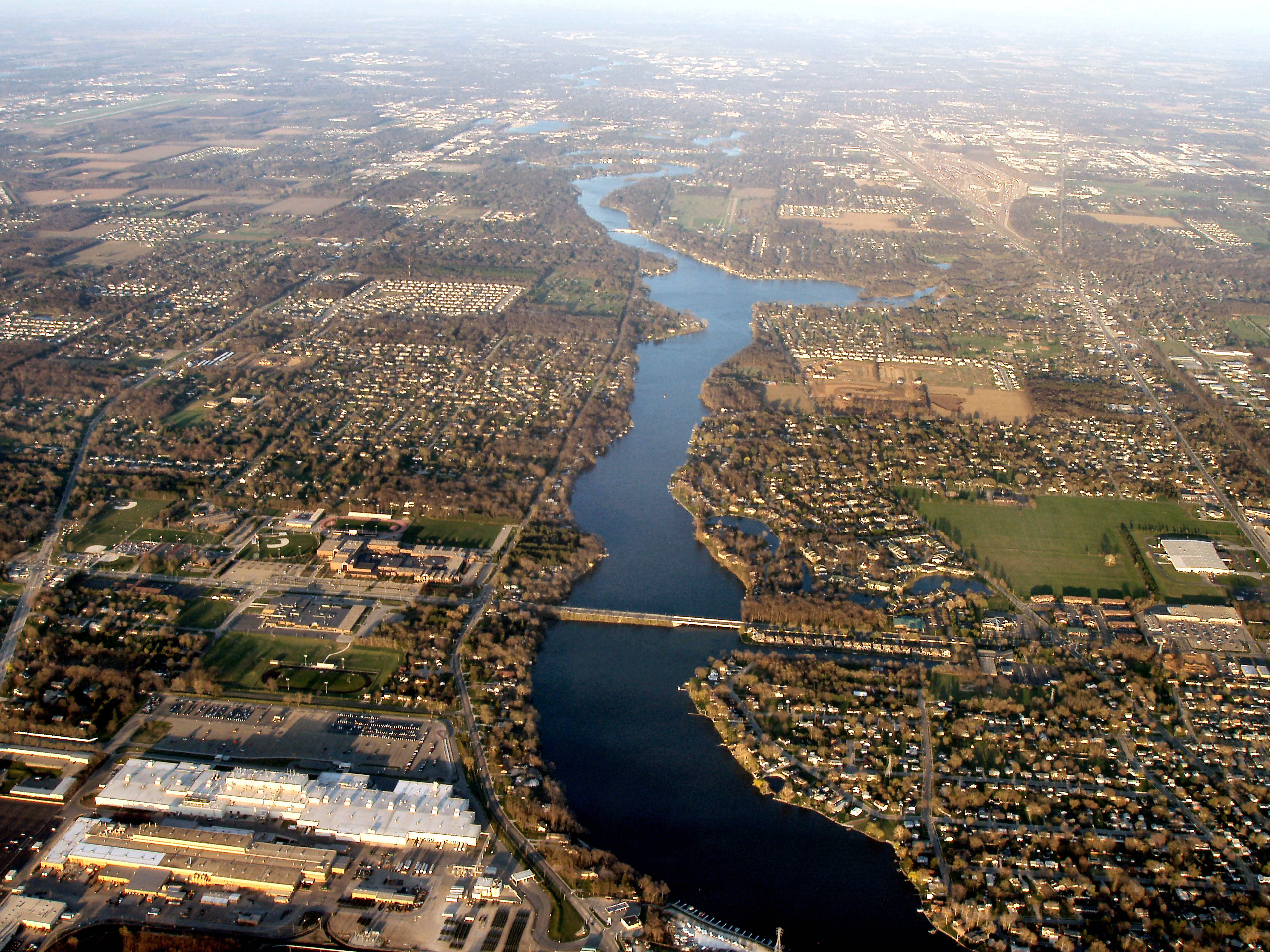
- St. Joseph River flowing west from Elkhart (top) through Osceola (middle) and into Mishawaka (bottom).

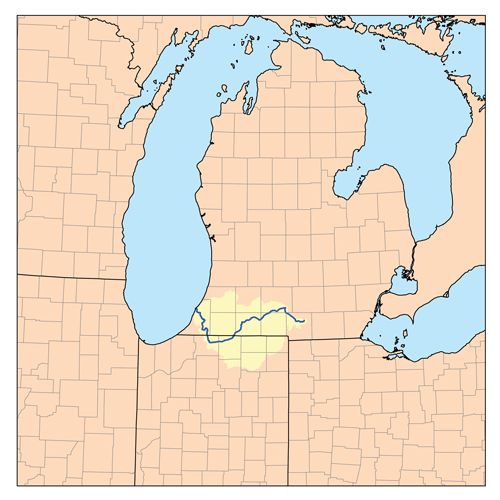
- Native name: Sakiwäsipi (Miami-Illinois)

Location
- Country: United States
- State: Michigan, Indiana

Physical characteristics
- Source: Baw Beese Lake
  - location: Hillsdale, Michigan
  - coordinates: 41°54′18″N 084°36′57″W
  - elevation: 1,096 ft (334 m)
- Mouth: Lake Michigan
  - location: St. Joseph, Michigan
  - coordinates: 42°06′51″N 086°29′18″W
  - elevation: 581 ft (177 m)
- Length: 210 mi (340 km)
- Discharge
  - location: mouth
  - average: 5,022.45 cu ft/s (142.220 m^{3}/s) (estimate)

Basin features
- Tributaries
  - left: Coldwater River, Swan Creek, Prairie River, Fawn River, Pigeon River, Elkhart River, Little Elkhart River
  - right: Nottawa Creek, Portage River, Rocky River, Dowagiac River, Paw Paw River
- GNIS ID: 1624891

The Saint Joseph River (known locally as the Saint Joe) is a 210-mile-long (340 km) river that flows in a generally westerly direction through southern Michigan and northern Indiana, United States, before emptying into Lake Michigan. The Saint Joseph River drainage basin covers 4,685 square miles (12,130 km^{2}), and is the third largest watershed draining to Lake Michigan. The land within its bounds is primarily used for agriculture. The river and its tributaries provide a variety of paddling and fishing environments. Historically, the river served as an important canoe transportation route for various Native American tribes, and for French Canadian Voyageurs.

== Description of the watershed ==
The Saint Joseph River watershed drains 4,685 square miles (12,130 km^{2}) from 15 counties: Berrien, Branch, Calhoun, Cass, Hillsdale, Kalamazoo, Saint Joseph and Van Buren in Michigan and DeKalb, Elkhart, Kosciusko, LaGrange, Noble, Saint Joseph and Steuben in Indiana. The watershed includes 3,742 river miles (6,022 km) and flows through and near the Kalamazoo-Portage, Elkhart-Goshen, Mishawaka-South Bend, and Saint Joseph/Benton Harbor metropolitan areas. The St. Joseph River main stem is 206 miles (332 km) long, rising in southern Michigan in Hillsdale County flowing from Baw Beese Lake, within 5 miles (8 km) of the headwaters of the other Saint Joseph River of the eastward-flowing Maumee River watershed. Baw Beese Lake was historically named for the Potawatomi Chief Baw Beese.

The river follows a zigzag route generally westward across southern Michigan, dipping into northern Indiana. From its headwaters, it flows initially northwest past Hillsdale into southeastern Calhoun County, then turns abruptly southwest to flow past Tekonsha, Union City, Sherwood, and Mendon. At Three Rivers it is joined from the north by the Rocky and Portage rivers, and by the Prairie River from the east, after making an abrupt turn south. At Constantine it receives the Fawn River from the east. Next, after returning to a southwest course, it receives the Pigeon River from the east, near the Michigan–Indiana state line. In northern Indiana, the river flows west-southwest through Elkhart, Mishawaka, and South Bend, where it turns abruptly north to re-enter southwestern Michigan in southeastern Berrien County. In southwestern Michigan, it follows a wide meandering route generally northwest through Niles and past Berrien Springs. Just North of Niles it receives the Dowagiac River. It divides St. Joseph and Benton Harbor, receiving the Paw Paw River from the north approximately 1 mile (1.6 km) from its mouth in St. Joseph on Lake Michigan.

There are 190 dams in the Saint Joseph River watershed, and 17 on the river mainstem. Most of these dams block fish passage, although fish ladders constructed on the lower dams allow salmonine passage as far as the Twin Branch Dam in Mishawaka, Indiana. But, the fish ladders are not adequate for many native species, such as sturgeon, and the dams tend to be built on the higher gradient portions of the river, which are the most critical river habitats for fish spawning.

== History ==
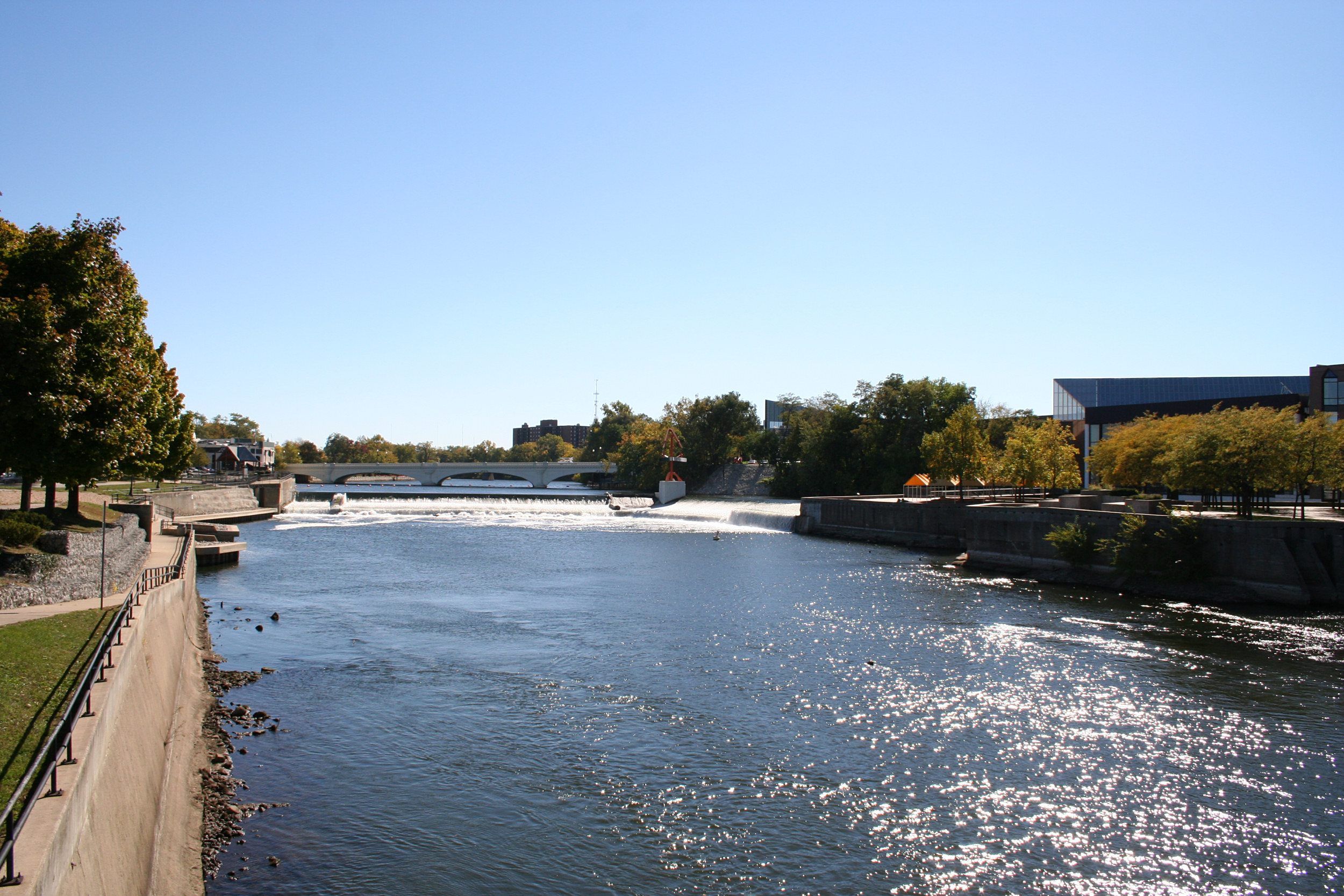
The Saint Joseph River flows through downtown South Bend, Indiana. The abrupt turn of the river gives the city its name.

saakiiweesiipiiwi (Outlet River, also historically spelt Sakiwasipi), as it was called by the Miami people, was inhabited for thousands of years by various indigenous tribes as it served an essential trade avenue in the Great Lakes region. The most recent indigenous inhabitants of the area were the Miami and Potawatomi peoples. Two different portages allowed nearly continuous travel by canoe among different watersheds of the region. The first major transfer point was at the headwaters in southwestern Michigan, where travelers could make a portage to the Saint Joseph River of the Maumee River watershed, which drained into Lake Erie. The second major transfer point was at South Bend, Indiana, where a short portage to the nearby Kankakee River allowed access to the Illinois River and subsequently to the Mississippi. Another major access point along river was at Niles, Michigan, where the Old Sauk Trail, a major east-west Indian trail, crossed the river.

The indigenous trade and navigation networks in the area allowed for extensive trade and movement of people, which allowed early Europeans access to the area in 1675 when Père Jacques Marquette was guided up the Mississippi River via the Illinois River, then to the Kankakee River and portaged to Sakiwasipi and then down to Lake Michigan. On November 1, 1679 René Robert Cavelier, Sieur de La Salle sailed southeast across Lake Michigan and built Fort Miami at the mouth of the river. La Salle named the river La Rivière des Miamis (River of the Miamis).

At the end of 1679, La Salle followed indigenous trade routes in the opposite direction of that taken by Marquette; heading up the St. Joseph River and portaging to the Kankakee River, getting as far west on the Illinois River as modern-day Peoria, Illinois, before returning to Fort Miami. After giving up on the return of his ship, Le Griffon, in April 1680, he became the first European to walk the well traveled indigenous routes east across the Lower Peninsula of Michigan back to the Detroit River and Canada. The French established Fort St. Joseph at the crossroads of Old Sauk Trail and this well-established east–west trail in 1691.

The watershed was later used as canoe route by early French fur trappers in the Illinois Country. European American settlement of the St. Joseph river basin area began to increase in earnest after southwestern Michigan was surveyed in 1829. From the early 1830s until 1846, the river bore various commodities from upstream to a busy port at St. Joseph, where they were loaded onto lake boats for shipment to Chicago and elsewhere.

On April 11, 1893, a Lake Michigan seiche (a phenomenon similar to an ocean tsunami) pushed a wall of water, 3 to 5 feet (0.91 to 1.52 m) high, up the river at St. Joseph and Benton Harbor. This raised the level of the river by 4 to 5 feet (1.2 to 1.5 m). The cause of the seiche was unknown, but has been attributed to a sudden squall or change in atmospheric pressure.

=== South Bend Race Canals ===
Factories located in South Bend because of access to the river and hydro-power created in the East and West Races. The water rights to what would become the East and West Races were claimed by Alexis Coquillard and Lathrop Taylor in 1831, when the city of South Bend was founded. Although the idea of digging a mill race (man-made canal) was put forth in 1835, a dam and the East and West Races were not constructed until 1843. The construction was done by the South Bend Manufacturing Company, incorporated in December 1842 for this very purpose. The South Bend Manufacturing Company thus became owner of the water power rights on the West Race canal, while Samuel L. Cottrell purchased the water rights along the East Race canal.

In 1867 the South Bend Hydraulic Company purchased the rights to the East Race canal for $100. In 1903 the ownership of stock, property rights, and property of the South Bend Manufacturing Company on the West Race canal passed to the Oliver Chilled Plow Works. Over the next two years the Oliver Chilled Plow Works constructed a hydro-electric power plant on the waterway to supply electricity for light, heat, and power to the Oliver Opera House, Oliver Hotel, South Bend factories, and other Oliver buildings.

Other sources of energy and changes in technology resulted in the canals no longer being used for industrial purposes. In the late 1940s the Indiana and Michigan Electric Company purchased the rights along the East Race canal. They began filling it in around 1954 for re-use for other purposes. In 1973 the Oliver Chilled Plow Works hydro-electric plant was demolished to make room for construction of the Century Center, which was completed in 1977. The West Race still exists as a canal North of Jefferson Boulevard and South of Colfax Avenue on the banks of Century Center, between Pier Park and Island Park.

In the early 1980s, the East Race canal was re-excavated. It was converted to a man-made whitewater kayaking course, now known as the East Race Waterway.

==== East Race Waterway ====
41.676°N 86.245°W

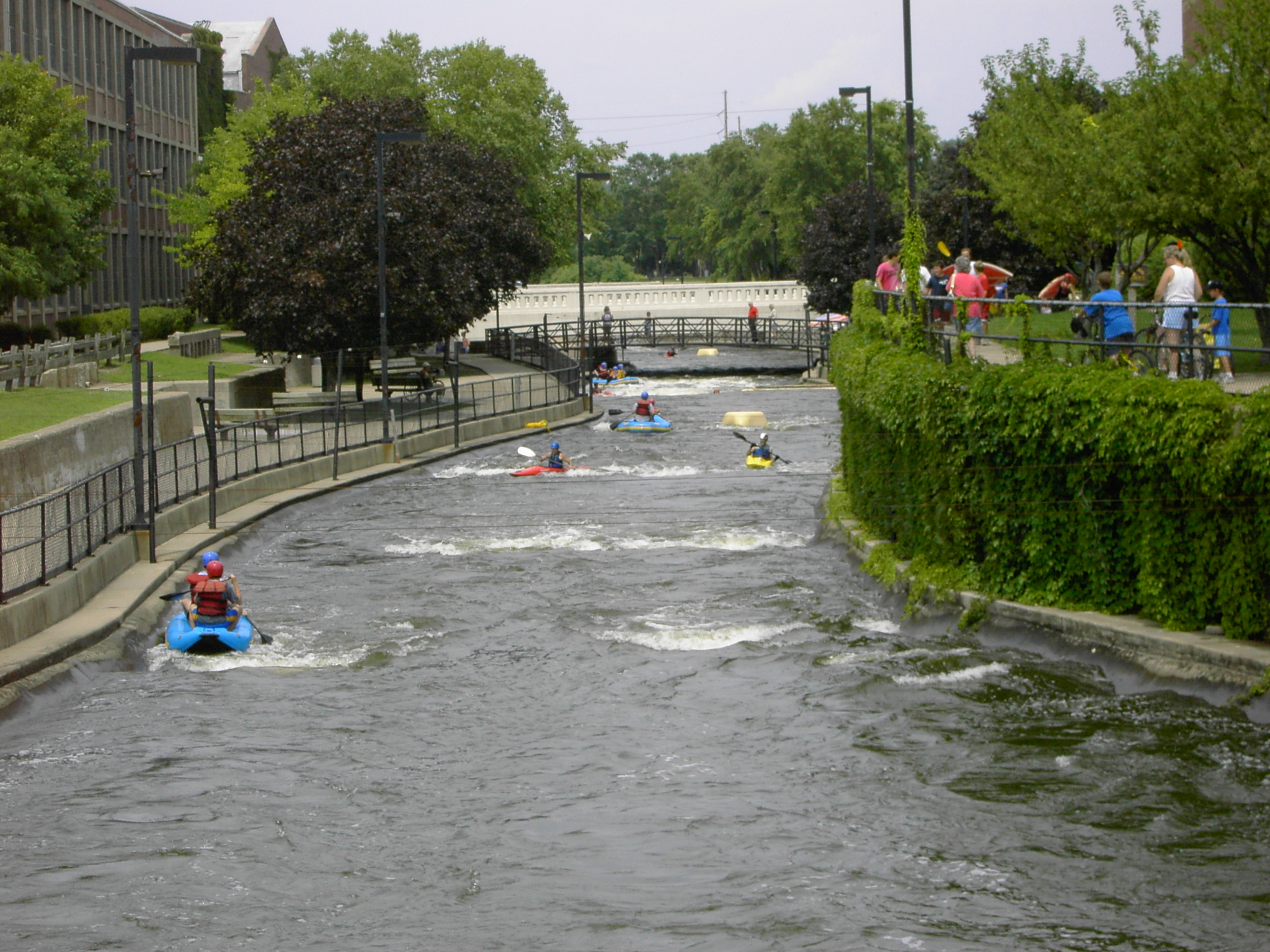
East Race Waterway

In 1984, the abandoned East Race canal in South Bend, whose outlets were both at the river, was converted into the East Race Waterway, North America's first artificial whitewater waterway and the first of four in the United States. Locals first proposed in 1973 that the 19th-century waterway be reopened; construction began in August 1982 and the East Race reopened on June 29, 1984. Through the use of movable barriers and obstacles, the East Race can be configured to provide a whitewater course for recreational and competitive canoeing, kayaking and rafting. In 2021, the East Race was temporarily closed for construction. The City of South Bend is building a hydroelectric dam on the waterway. The project was funded by the University of Notre Dame.

=== Historic sites ===
Two sites in the river basin, Moccasin Bluff and Fort Saint Joseph, are listed on the U.S. National Register of Historic Places. Carey Mission, Fort Miami, and Burnett Trading Post are listed as State Registered Historic Sites.

== Ecology and conservation ==
Before European settlement, the watershed was dominated by deciduous forests consisting of maple, ash, oak, elm, walnut, and beech species, along with pockets of white, red and jack pine species. There were also prairies up to several miles across, which were grazed by elk (Cervus canadensis), white-tailed deer (Odocoileus virginianus), moose (Alces alces), and bison (Bison bison). By 1900 the virgin forests were mostly logged, and the prairies largely converted to agricultural use, as were many drained wetlands.

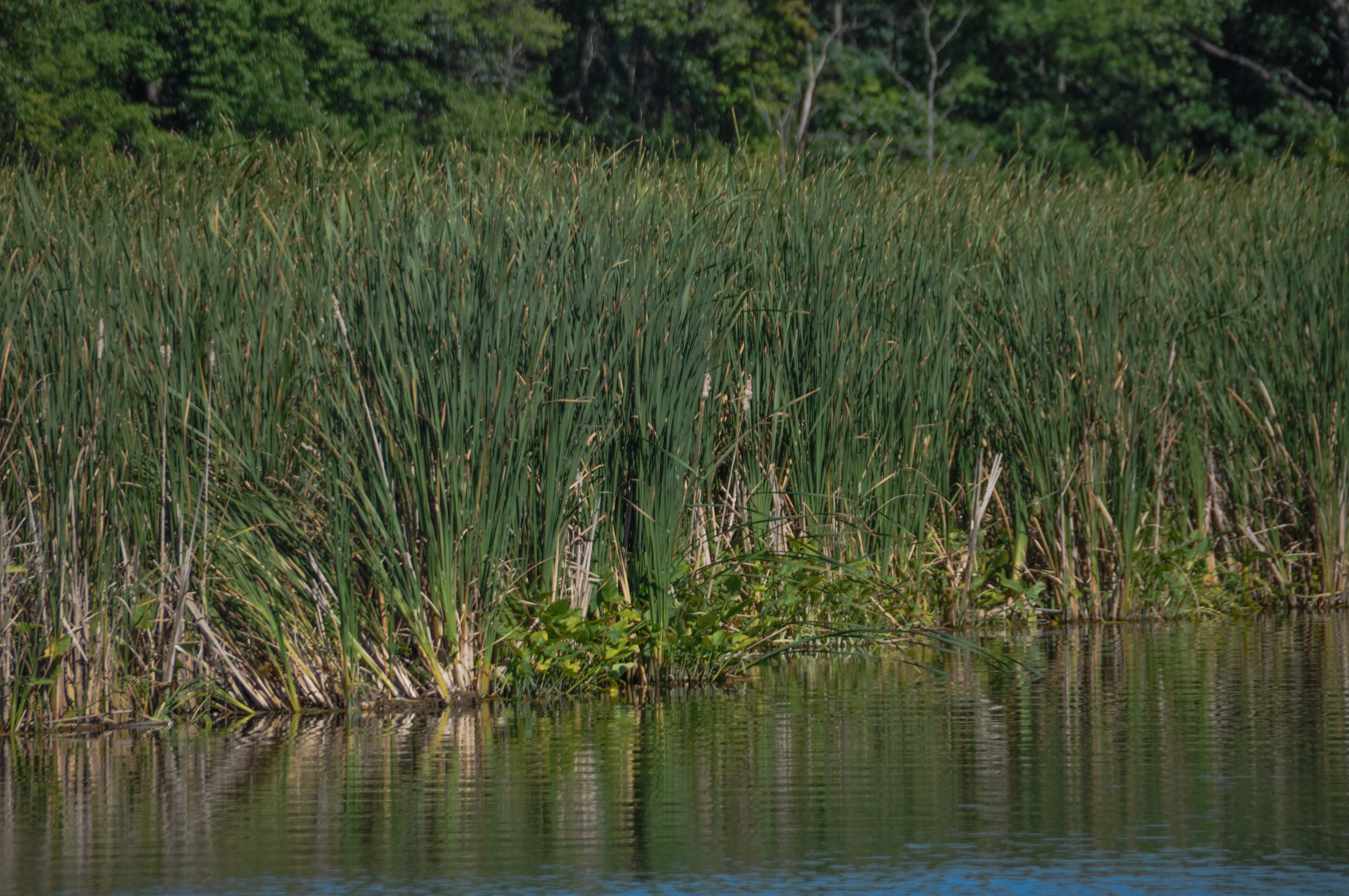
Flora along the St. Joseph River bank plants at Union City, Michigan, in August 2023

Among the unique natural features that remain in the watershed are prairie fens, coastal plain marshes, bogs, floodplain forests, hardwood swamps, and moist hardwood forests. Rare plants include prairie dropseed (Sporobolus heterolepis), rosinweed, tall beak rush, and umbrella grass.

The wetlands and floodplain forests provide habitat to nearly half of all migratory birds in Indiana and Michigan and are a vital habitat for resident species as well, such as wild turkey (Meleagris gallopavo), coyote (Canis latrans), fox, beaver (Castor canadensis), mink (Neogale vison), Indiana bat (Myotis sodalis), eastern box turtle (Terrapene carolina carolina), and the rare spotted turtle (Clemmys guttata) and northern redbelly snake (Storeria occipitomaculata occipitomaculata), both protected by the state of Michigan. The lower Pigeon River is home to the federally endangered Indiana Bat.

In 1969, the Michigan Department of Natural Resources began stocking the lower 23 miles (37 km) of the river for steelhead trout (Oncorhynchus mykiss), Chinook salmon (Oncorhynchus tshawytscha) and coho salmon (Oncorhynchus kisutch). In 1975, Michigan constructed a fish ladder at the Berrien Springs Dam to enable the salmonids to run an additional 10 miles (16 km) upstream to the Buchanan Dam. In 1980 the Michigan Department of Natural Resources, Indiana Department of Natural Resources and United States Fish and Wildlife Service signed the "St. Joseph River Interstate Cooperative Salmonid Management Plan", which led to construction of fish ladders at the Buchanan, Niles, South Bend and Mishawaka dams. By 1992 the salmonid runs were extended to the Twin Branch Dam in Indiana, a distance of 63 miles (101 km) from Lake Michigan. This enabled the trout and salmon to spawn in coldwater tributaries such as McCoy Creek.

Although completion of fish ladders on the lowest five mainstem dams in 1992 allowed salmonine passage as far as Twin Branch Dam in Mishawaka, Indiana, 94% of the fish that pass are salmon and trout, as the ladders were not designed to permit passage of migrating native fish. Historically, the migrating native species included lake sturgeon (Acipenser fulvescens), bass (smallmouth and largemouth), redhorse (silver, golden, shorthead, river, and greater) (Moxostoma ssp.), walleye (Sander vitreus), lake trout (Salvelinus namaycush), lake whitefish (Coregonus clupeaformis), northern pike (Esox lucius) and American pickerel (E. americanus vermiculatus). Every spring the Potawatomi and early settlers used spears, seines and dip nets to catch their annual supply of fish. The abundance of lake sturgeon made the area around Niles famous in the mid-to late-1800s. Fish up to 12 feet (3.7 m) long and 300 pounds (140 kg) were taken by anglers, and their roe was exported to Russia as caviar. Sturgeon used to migrate as far as Hillsdale County, Michigan, and Sturgeon Lake near Colon, Michigan, still bears the name of this mighty fish. Now the spawning sturgeon rarely reach Niles, as they are impeded by the dam at Berrien Springs, reducing the length of the river used by them for spawning by 155 miles (249 km). Historically, ninety-seven species of fish were native to the Saint Joseph River Basin.

In 1994, the Friends of the Saint Joe River (FotSJR), a non-profit conservation organization, was founded by Athens, Michigan, residents Al and Margaret Smith, to organize the river communities to clean and restore the river. In 2002 FotSJR developed the St. Joseph River Watershed Management Plan, with grant support from the Michigan Department of Environmental Quality. The river delivers significant pollutants to Lake Michigan - including sewage overflows from riverside communities, sediments and toxic substances such as mercury and polychlorinated biphenyl (PCB). When the plan was developed, the river carried the greatest portion of atrazine into Lake Michigan. It is an agricultural herbicide associated with cancer even at low levels and is a very common contaminant of drinking water.

== Recreation ==
The Saint Joseph River is a trout and salmon sport fishery, encompassing 47 miles (76 km) of river in Michigan and 16 miles (26 km) in Indiana. The economic benefits to local Michigan and Indiana communities are estimated at several million dollars annually.

Canoeists can travel the entire length of the main stem, if they are prepared to portage. Many of the larger tributaries offer opportunities for paddling, hiking, hunting, and fishing.

== Cities, towns, and villages along the St. Joseph River ==
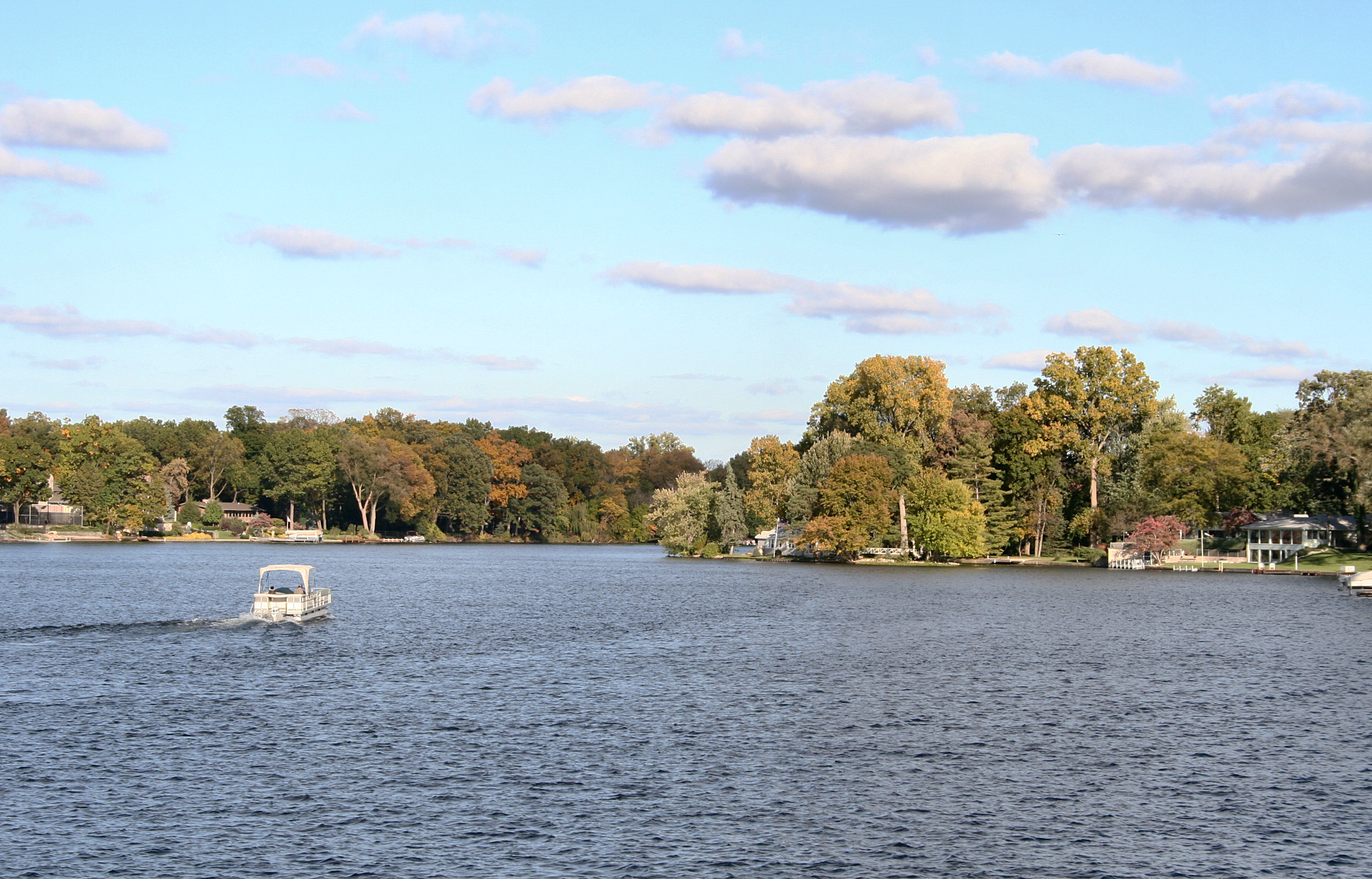
The Saint Joseph River at Elkhart, Indiana

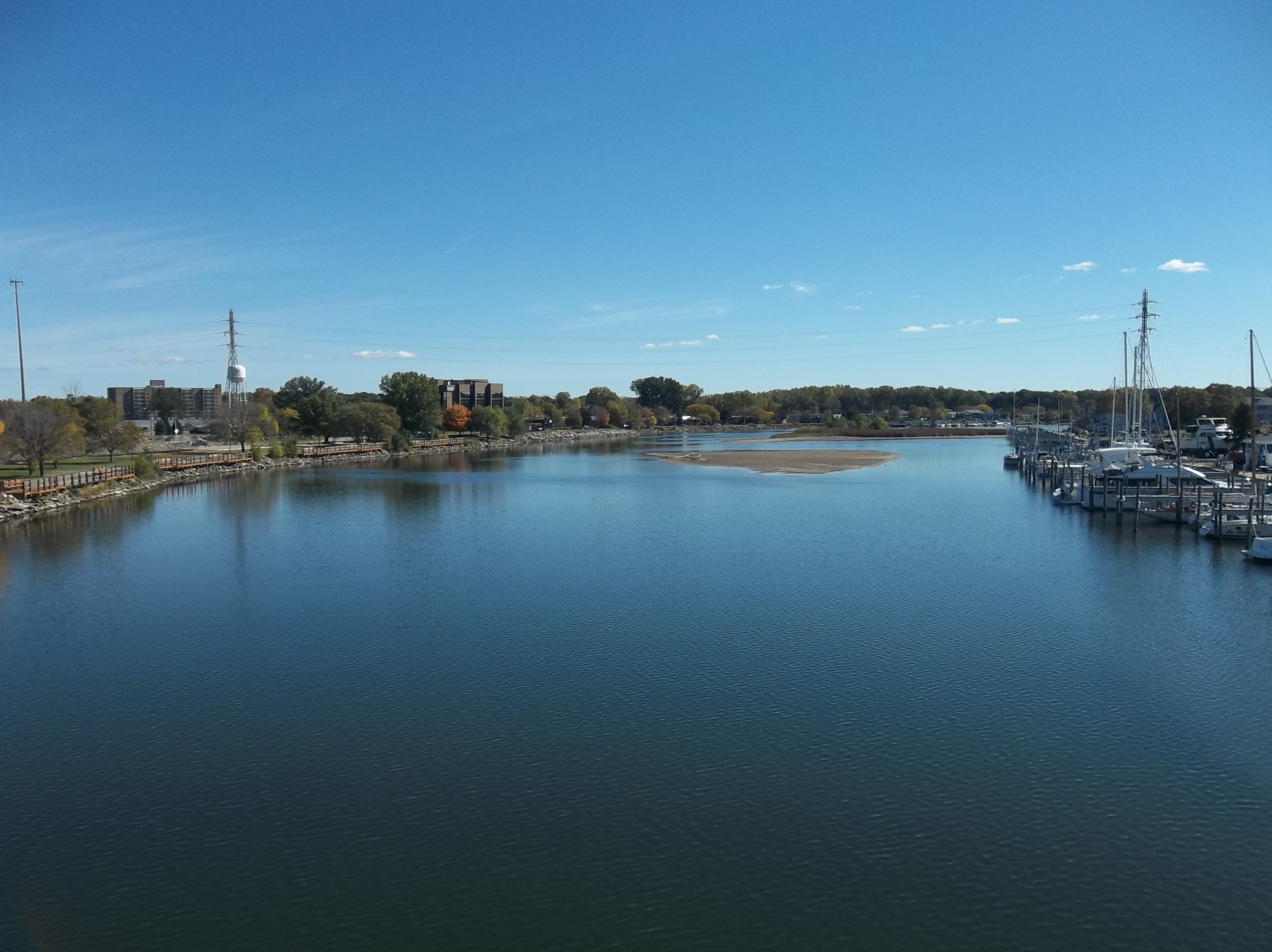
The Saint Joseph River between Benton Harbor and Saint Joseph near Lake Michigan

- Saint Joseph, Michigan
- Benton Harbor, Michigan
- Fair Plain, Michigan
- Berrien Springs, Michigan
- Buchanan, Michigan
- Niles, Michigan
- South Bend, Indiana
- Mishawaka, Indiana
- Osceola, Indiana
- Elkhart, Indiana
- Bristol, Indiana
- Constantine, Michigan
- Three Rivers, Michigan
- Mendon, Michigan
- Union City, Michigan
- Burlington, Michigan
- Tekonsha, Michigan
- Litchfield, Michigan
- Jonesville, Michigan
- Hillsdale, Michigan

== Dams ==
A list of dams on the Saint Joseph River.

| Name | State Located | Height | Purpose | Type | Capacity (MW) | Year | Owner Name | Size of Storage (Acre Ft) | Coordinates | Comments |
|---|---|---|---|---|---|---|---|---|---|---|
| A H Randal Milling Dam | Michigan | 7.17' | Other | Unknown | | 1836 | Randal Food Products | 56 | 42°05'18.0"N 84°59'12.0"W | |
| Ball Band Dam (In-Channel) | Indiana | 10' | Other | Concrete | 2.201917 | 1834 | Edgewater LLC | 291 | 41°39'47.2"N 86°10'38.2"W | |
| Baw Beese Lake Dame | Michigan | 6.2' | Recreation | Concrete | | 1979 | Hillsdale County Drain Commissioner | 1,950 | 41°54'36.0"N 84°36'57.0"W | |
| Berrien Springs Dam | Michigan | 36' | Hydroelectric | Gravity, Earth | 7.2 | 1908 | American Electric Power | 6,400 | 41°56'39.0"N 86°19'41.5"W | |
| Buchanan Dam | Michigan | 23' | Hydroelectric | Gravity, Earth | 4.4 | 1895 | Indiana & Michigan Power Company | 3,895 | 41°50'20.7"N 86°21'04.5"W | |
| Constantine Dam | Michigan | 30' | Hydroelectric | Gravity, Earth | 1.2 | 1873 | Indiana & Michigan Power Company | 5,750 | 41°50′49.90″N 85°40′5.96″W | |
| Elkhart Dam | Indiana | | | | 3.4 | 1913 | American Electric Power | | | |
| French Hydro | Michigan | 13' | Hydroelectric | Arch, Earth | 1.3 | 1914 | French Hydro, LLC | 1,600 | 41°49'03.4"N 86°15'32.8"W | |
| French Paper Company AKA Niles Dam | Michigan | 22' | Hydroelectric | Gravity, Earth | | 1887 | French Paper Company | 1,600 | 41°49'03.6"N 86°15'32.9"W | |
| Hillsdale Millpond Dam | Michigan | 14' | Recreation | Earth | | 1837 | City of Hillsdale | 100 | 41°54'54.6"N 84°37'30.8"W | |
| Jonesville Millpond Dam | Michigan | 9' | Recreation | Gravity, Earth | | 1872 | Private Ownership, Jack Mosley | 170 | 41°58'24.0"N 84°39'36.0"W | |
| Litchfield Dam | Michigan | 8' | Other | Earth | | 1846 | Memorial Mile Club, Inc | 52 | 42°02'05.6"N 84°44'10.1"W | |
| Lamberson Dam | Michigan | 16' | Retired Hydro | | | | Village of Colon | | | |
| Mottville Dam | Michigan | 23' | Hydroelectric, Recreation | Gravity, Earth | 1.68 | 1920 | Indiana & Michigan Power Company | 4,256 | 41°48'20.0"N 85°44'59.8"W | |
| Riley Dam AKA Union City Dam | Michigan | 20.3' | Hydroelectric | Gravity, Earth | .417 | 1923 | Village of Union City | 5,000 | 42°02'39.3"N 85°12'10.8"W | |
| South Bend Dam | Indiana | | Hydroelectric | | 2.5 | 1859 | | | | |
| Sturgis Dam | Michigan | 25' | Hydroelectric | Buttress, Earth | 2.2 | 1913 | City of Sturgis | 9,300 | 41°58'15.2"N 85°32'18.1"W | |
| Three Rivers Dam AKA Fairbanks Morse Dam | Michigan | 16' | Hydroelectric | Gravity, Earth | .9 | 1917 | Grande Pointe Power | 902 | 41°56'27.0"N 85°37'29.8"W | |
| Twin Branch Dam | Indiana | 41' | Hydroelectric | Gravity, Timber Crib, Earth | 4.8 | 1903 | Indiana & Michigan Power Company | 10,000 | 41°39′56.98″N 86°7′58.03″W | |

== Crossings ==
Saint Joseph River crossings are located in towns or cities within seven counties of two states.

List of Crossings
| Name | Type | City | County | State | Location |
|---|---|---|---|---|---|
| CSX Grand Rapids Subdivision | Railroad | St. Joseph | Berrien | Michigan | |
| M-63 (Blossomland Bridge) | Michigan Highway | St. Joseph | Berrien | Michigan | 42°6′44.44″N 86°28′40.39″W |
| BL I-94 | Interstate business loop | St. Joseph/Benton Harbor border | Berrien | Michigan | |
| Napier Avenue | City Street | St. Joseph/St. Joseph Charter Township border | Berrien | Michigan | |
| I-94 | Interstate Highway | Royalton Township/Benton Charter Township border | Berrien | Michigan | |
| M-139 | Michigan highway | Royalton Township/Benton Charter Township border | Berrien | Michigan | |
| US 31 | US Route | Sodus Township/Oronoko Charter Township border | Berrien | Michigan | |
| M-139 (East Ferry Street) | Michigan highway | Berrien Springs | Berrien | Michigan | 42°3′29.18″N 86°26′18.35″W |
| US 31 | US Route | Oronoko Charter Township/Berrien Township border | Berrien | Michigan | 41°59′8.93″N 86°22′16.64″W |
| Walton Road | County Road | Buchanan/Buchanan Township border | Berrien | Michigan | |
| US 31 | US Route | Niles Charter Township | Berrien | Michigan | |
| Amtrak Michigan Line | Railroad | Niles | Berrien | Michigan | |
| M-139 | Michigan Highway | Niles | Berrien | Michigan | |
| US 12 (Pulaski Highway) | US Route | Niles Charter Township/Bertrand Township border | Berrien | Michigan | |
| West Bertrand Road | County road | Niles Charter Township/Bertrand Township border | Berrien | Michigan | 41°46′28.13″N 86°16′1.93″W |
| Auten Road | County road | German Township/Clay Township border | St. Joseph | Indiana | |
| Darden Road | County road | German Township/Clay Township border | St. Joseph | Indiana | |
| US 31 Bus. (Cleveland Road) | City street | Clay Township/South Bend border | St. Joseph | Indiana | |
| I-80/ I-90 (Indiana Toll Road) | Interstate Highway | South Bend | St. Joseph | Indiana | |
| Coal Line Trail rail trail | Former railroad | South Bend | St. Joseph | Indiana | |
| West Angela Boulevard | City Street | South Bend | St. Joseph | Indiana | |
| SR 933 / US 31 Bus. (Michigan Street) | City street | South Bend | St. Joseph | Indiana | |
| East LaSalle Street | City Street | South Bend | St. Joseph | Indiana | |
| East Colfax Avenue | City Street | South Bend | St. Joseph | Indiana | |
| East Jefferson Boulevard | City Street | South Bend | St. Joseph | Indiana | |
| SR 23 (South Eddy Street) | City Street | South Bend | St. Joseph | Indiana | |
| East Sample Street | City Street | South Bend | St. Joseph | Indiana | |
| Railroad | Railroad | South Bend | St. Joseph | Indiana | |
| Twyckenham Drive | City Street | South Bend | St. Joseph | Indiana | |
| South Ironwood Drive | City Street | Mishawaka | St. Joseph | Indiana | |
| Logan Street | City Street | Mishawaka | St. Joseph | Indiana | |
| North Main Street | City Street | Mishawaka | St. Joseph | Indiana | |
| North Cedar Street | City Street | Mishawaka | St. Joseph | Indiana | |
| East Mishawaka Avenue | City Street | | St. Joseph | Indiana | |
| SR 331 (Capital Avenue) | City Street | | St. Joseph | Indiana | |
| North Bittersweet Road | City Street | | St. Joseph | Indiana | |
| Ash Road (former SR 219) | City Street | | St. Joseph County/Elkhart County border | Indiana | |
| SR 19 (South Nappanee Street) | City Street | Elkhart | Elkhart | Indiana | |
| Bridge Street | City Street | Elkhart | Elkhart | Indiana | |
| West Lexington Avenue | City Street | Elkhart | Elkhart | Indiana | |
| Sherman Street | City Street | Elkhart | Elkhart | Indiana | |
| Main Street | City Street | Elkhart | Elkhart | Indiana | |
| Island Park access | Trail | Elkhart | Elkhart | Indiana | |
| | Railroad | Elkhart | Elkhart | Indiana | |
| Johnson Street | City Street | Elkhart | Elkhart | Indiana | |
| CR 17 | County Road | Concord Township/Osolo Township/Washington Township border | Elkhart | Indiana | |
| SR 15 (North Division Street) | City Street | Bristol | Elkhart | Indiana | |
| I-80/ I-90 (Indiana Toll Road) | Interstate Highway | | Elkhart | Indiana | |
| US 12 | US Route | Mottville | St. Joseph | Michigan | 41°48′0″N 85°45′24.84″W |
| Camelback bridge (Old US 12) | Pedestrian bridge | Mottville | St. Joseph | Michigan | 41°48′0″N 85°45′24.84″W |
| US 131 | US Route | Constantine Township | St. Joseph | Michigan | 41°50′3.09″N 85°40′42.47″W |
| Bus. US 131 (North Washington Street) | City Street | Constantine | St. Joseph | Michigan | 41°50′34.39″N 85°40′10.72″W |
| Withers Road | County Road | | St. Joseph | Michigan | |
| Constantine Road | County Road | | St. Joseph | Michigan | |
| M-86 | Michigan Highway | Three Rivers | St. Joseph | Michigan | 41°56′39″N 85°37′56″W |
| Sixth Street | City Street | Three Rivers | St. Joseph | Michigan | |
| Langley Covered Bridge (Covered Bridge Road) | County Road | Lockport Township | St. Joseph | Michigan | 41°58′02″N 085°31′41″W |
| S. Nottawa Street | County Road | Mendon | St. Joseph | Michigan | 42°0′18.3″N 85°26′58.3″W |
| M-66 | Michigan Highway | Mendon Township/Leonidas Township border | St. Joseph | Michigan | 42°0′27.58″N 85°24′40.38″W |
| South Broadway Street | City Street | Union City | Branch County | Michigan | |
| 11 Mile Road | County Road | Burlington | Calhoun County | Michigan | 42°6′17″N 85°4′43″W |
| I-69 | Interstate Highway | Tekonsha | Calhoun County | Michigan | 42°5′16.13″N 84°59′53.45″W |
| M-49 (S. Chicago Street) | Michigan Highway | Litchfield | Hillsdale County | Michigan | 42°02′35″N 84°45′25″W |
| US 12/ M-99 (W. Chicago Street) | US Route/Michigan Highway | Jonesville | Hillsdale County | Michigan | 41°58′52″N 84°39′59″W |

== See also ==
- List of Indiana rivers
- List of Michigan rivers
