= Chapin Park Historic District =

Historic district in Indiana, United States

- U.S. National Register of Historic Places
- U.S. Historic district
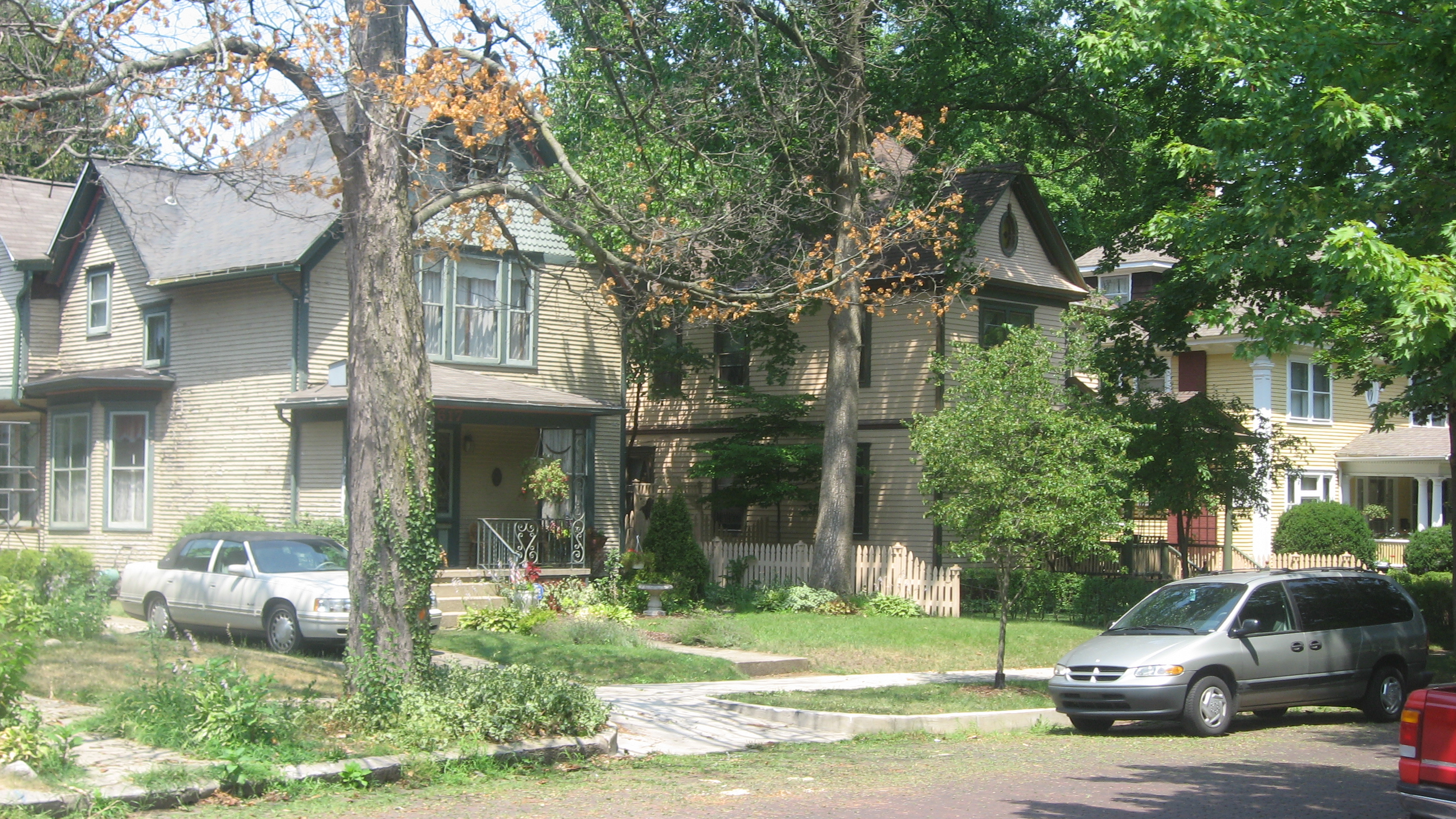
- Park Avenue in Chapin Park, July 2012

- Location within Indiana Location within the United States
- Location: Roughly bounded by St. Joseph River, Main, Madison, Rex, Lindsey and William Sts., Leland and Portage Aves., South Bend, Indiana
- Coordinates: 41°41′06″N 86°15′19″W
- Area: 87 acres (35 ha)
- Architectural style: Second Empire, Queen Anne, Gothic Revival
- NRHP reference No.: 82000073
- Added to NRHP: February 4, 1982

Chapin Park Historic District is a national historic district located at South Bend, Indiana. It encompasses 260 contributing buildings and three contributing sites immediately north of downtown South Bend. Most of its development occurred between about 1890 and 1910 on land formerly comprising the estate of Horatio Chapin, an early settler of South Bend. The neighborhood includes examples of Second Empire, Queen Anne, and Gothic Revival style architecture. Notable buildings include the Horatio Chapin House (1857, 1891), Judge Andrew Anderson House (1875, 1905), Hodson's Castle (1888), South Bend Civic Theater (1898), YMCA (1928), and Christian Science Church (1916).

It was listed on the National Register of Historic Places in 1982.
