= La Salle Street Bridge (South Bend, Indiana) =

- U.S. National Register of Historic Places
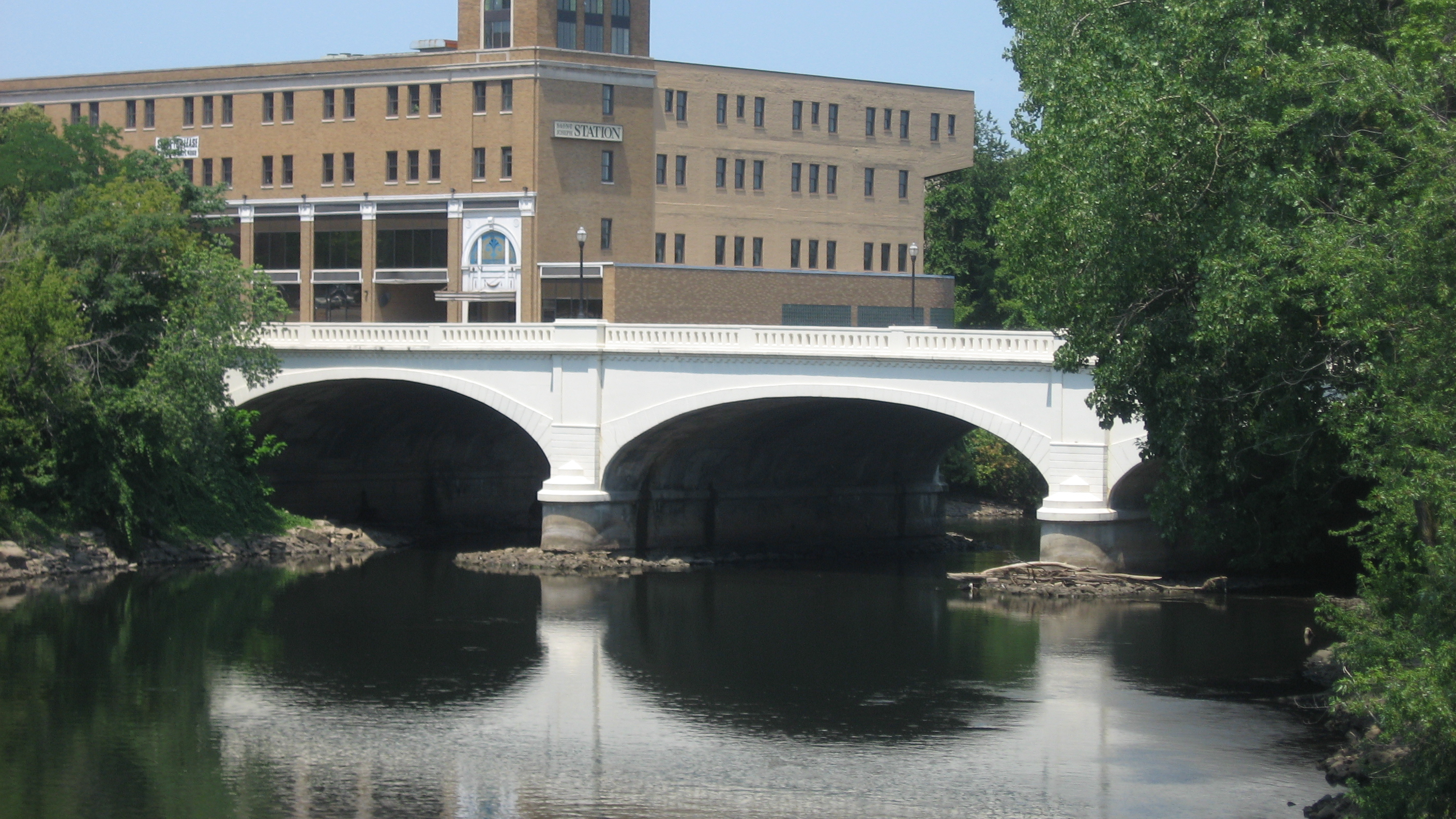
- La Salle Street Bridge, July 2012

- Location within Indiana Location within the United States
- Location: La Salle St., over the St. Joseph R., South Bend, Indiana
- Coordinates: 41°40′45″N 86°14′56″W
- Area: less than one acre
- Built: 1907
- Architect: Hammond, A.J.
- Architectural style: Filled Spandrel Arch
- MPS: East Bank MPS
- NRHP reference No.: 99000181
- Added to NRHP: February 18, 1999

La Salle Street Bridge is a historic Spandrel Arch bridge located at South Bend, Indiana. It was built in 1907, and is a three-span, reinforced concrete bridge that crosses the St. Joseph River. It measures 279 feet long and 51 feet wide.

It was listed on the National Register of Historic Places in 1999. The previous bridge at this location is also listed on the register.
