= Centreville, Michigan =

- Village
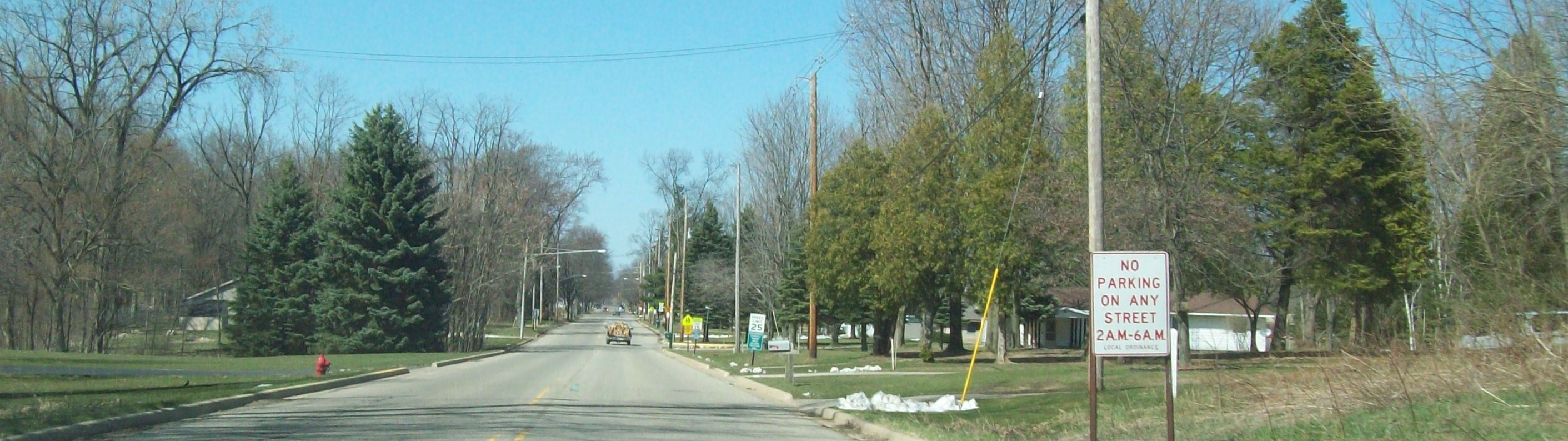
- Streets of Centreville

- Location of Centreville, Michigan
- Coordinates: 41°55′23″N 85°31′39″W
- Country: United States
- State: Michigan
- County: St. Joseph

Area
  - Total: 1.49 sq mi (3.87 km^{2})
  - Land: 1.48 sq mi (3.84 km^{2})
  - Water: 0.012 sq mi (0.03 km^{2})
- Elevation: 820 ft (250 m)

Population (2020)
  - Total: 1,319
  - Density: 890/sq mi (343.8/km^{2})
- Time zone: UTC-5 (Eastern (EST))
  - Summer (DST): UTC-4 (EDT)
- Zip Code: 49032
- Area code: 269
- FIPS code: 26-14460
- GNIS feature ID: 1624448
- Website: Village website

Centreville is a village in the U.S. state of Michigan and the county seat of St. Joseph County. As of the 2020 census, Centreville had a population of 1,319.

== History ==
Centreville developed around a tavern founded there in 1831 by European-American settler, Thomas W. Langley. It was incorporated as a village in 1837. The St. Joseph County Courthouse was built in 1842.

An Amish community, formed in 1910, is now the largest in the state.

Centreville is the location of the Langley Covered Bridge and the Leverett and Amanda Clapp House, historic landmarks.

== Geography ==
According to the United States Census Bureau, the village has a total area of 1.50 square miles (3.88 km^{2}), of which 1.49 square miles (3.86 km^{2}) is land and 0.01 square miles (0.03 km^{2}) is water.

=== Highways ===
- M-86

== Demographics ==
Historical population
Census	Pop.	Note	%±
1860	473		—
1870	749		58.4%
1880	705		−5.9%
1890	775		9.9%
1900	645		−16.8%
1910	613		−5.0%
1920	701		14.4%
1930	820		17.0%
1940	812		−1.0%
1950	879		8.3%
1960	971		10.5%
1970	1,044		7.5%
1980	1,202		15.1%
1990	1,516		26.1%
2000	1,579		4.2%
2010	1,425		−9.8%
2020	1,319		−7.4%
U.S. Decennial Census

=== 2010 census ===
As of the census of 2010, there were 1,425 people, 459 households, and 320 families living in the village. The population density was 956.4 inhabitants per square mile (369.3/km^{2}). There were 526 housing units at an average density of 353.0 per square mile (136.3/km^{2}). The racial makeup of the village was 93.7% White, 2.9% African American, 0.1% Native American, 0.4% Asian, 0.3% from other races, and 2.6% from two or more races. Hispanic or Latino of any race were 1.5% of the population.

There were 459 households, of which 38.1% had children under the age of 18 living with them, 48.1% were married couples living together, 15.9% had a female householder with no husband present, 5.7% had a male householder with no wife present, and 30.3% were non-families. 26.4% of all households were made up of individuals, and 12.9% had someone living alone who was 65 years of age or older. The average household size was 2.56 and the average family size was 3.08.

The median age in the village was 36.5 years. 23.6% of residents were under the age of 18; 9.8% were between the ages of 18 and 24; 28.7% were from 25 to 44; 23% were from 45 to 64; and 15.1% were 65 years of age or older. The gender makeup of the village was 50.5% male and 49.5% female.

=== 2000 census ===
As of the census of 2000, there were 1,579 people, 490 households, and 351 families living in the village. The population density was 1,116.9 inhabitants per square mile (431.2/km^{2}). There were 541 housing units at an average density of 382.7 per square mile (147.8/km^{2}). The racial makeup of the village was 94.74% White, 2.47% African American, 0.51% Native American, 0.25% Asian, 0.63% from other races, and 1.39% from two or more races. Hispanic or Latino of any race were 1.58% of the population.

There were 490 households, out of which 40.2% had children under the age of 18 living with them, 53.5% were married couples living together, 14.1% had a female householder with no husband present, and 28.2% were non-families. 24.3% of all households were made up of individuals, and 12.2% had someone living alone who was 65 years of age or older. The average household size was 2.73 and the average family size was 3.23.

In the village, the population was spread out, with 28.1% under the age of 18, 10.4% from 18 to 24, 30.9% from 25 to 44, 17.0% from 45 to 64, and 13.7% who were 65 years of age or older. The median age was 34 years. For every 100 females, there were 105.1 males. For every 100 females age 18 and over, there were 105.4 males.

The median income for a household in the village was $33,929, and the median income for a family was $42,955. Males had a median income of $32,692 versus $22,200 for females. The per capita income for the village was $15,472. About 8.0% of families and 7.9% of the population were below the poverty line, including 5.9% of those under age 18 and 8.6% of those age 65 or over.

== Schools ==
- Centreville High School, who won their first ever Michigan high school football championship in 2021

== Notable people ==
- Charles J. Beerstecher, delegate to California's Second Constitutional Convention and member of the California Railroad Commission; practiced law in Centreville
- Matt Thornton, pitcher with five Major League Baseball teams.
- Verne Troyer, actor (Mini-Me in the Austin Powers franchise); grew up in Centreville

== Pop culture ==
Centreville, Michigan is featured in the Season 8 premiere of Supernatural, however, the show misspells it as "Centerville". In the episode the main characters, Sam and Dean, fight demons at a fictional state college set in Centreville.
