= Lockport Township, Michigan =

- Township
- Location within the state of Michigan Lockport Township, Michigan (the United States)
- Coordinates: 41°56′44″N 85°35′12″W
- Country: United States
- State: Michigan
- County: St. Joseph

Area
  - Total: 31.3 sq mi (81.0 km^{2})
  - Land: 29.6 sq mi (76.7 km^{2})
  - Water: 1.7 sq mi (4.3 km^{2})
- Elevation: 817 ft (249 m)

Population (2020)
  - Total: 3,729
  - Density: 126/sq mi (48.6/km^{2})
- Time zone: UTC-5 (Eastern (EST))
  - Summer (DST): UTC-4 (EDT)
- FIPS code: 26-49060
- GNIS feature ID: 1626635
- Website: https://lockporttwp.com/

Lockport Township is a civil township of St. Joseph County in the U.S. state of Michigan. The population was 3,729 at the 2020 census.

== History ==
Lockport Township was established in 1840 by the division of what is now Fabius Township.

== Geography ==
According to the United States Census Bureau, the township has a total area of 31.3 square miles (81 km^{2}), of which 29.6 square miles (77 km^{2}) is land and 1.7 square miles (4.4 km^{2}) (5.31%) is water.

== Demographics ==
At the 2000 census, there were 3,814 people, 1,451 households and 1,067 families residing in the township. The population density was 128.8 people per square mile (49.7 people/km^{2}). There were 1,618 housing units at an average density of 54.7 units per square mile (21.1 units/km^{2}). The racial make-up of the township was 85.92% White, 10.38% African American, 0.42% Native American, 0.58% Asian, 0.89% from other races and 1.81% from two or more races. Hispanic or Latino of any race were 2.23% of the population.

There were 1,451 households, of which 36.0% had children under the age of 18 living with them, 58.0% were married couples living together, 11.3% had a female householder with no husband present and 26.4% were non-families. 21.4% of all households were made up of individuals, and 9.2% had someone living alone who was 65 years of age or older. The average household size was 2.63 and the average family size was 3.04.

28.7% of the population were under the age of 18, 7.8% from 18 to 24, 28.9% from 25 to 44, 23.3% from 45 to 64 and 11.3% who were 65 years of age or older. The median age was 35 years. For every 100 females, there were 97.5 males. For every 100 females age 18 and over, there were 93.2 males.

The median household income was $43,931 and the median family income was $52,760. Males had a median income of $38,143 and females $27,196. The per capita income was $21,184. About 8.5% of families and 9.9% of the population were below the poverty line, including 12.5% of those under age 18 and 7.6% of those age 65 or over.
