= Fun (disambiguation) =

Fun generally refers to recreation or entertainment.

Fun may also refer to:

== Arts, entertainment, and media ==
=== Music ===
- Fun (band), an American indie pop band

==== Albums ====
- Fun (Daniel Johnston album), 1994
- Fun (Garth Brooks album), 2020
- Fun?, by the Candyskins, 1993

==== Songs ====
- "Fun" (Blondie song), 2017
- "Fun" (Coldplay song), 2015
- "Fun" (Da Mob song), 1998
- "Fun" (Pitbull song), 2015
- "Fun" (Selena Gomez song), 2020
- "Fun" (Xu Weizhou song), 2016
- "Fun", by Little Sis Nora, 2020
- "Fun", by Smash Mouth from Get the Picture?, 2003
- "Fun!", by Fromis 9, 2019
- "F.U.N. Fun Fanaa", by Ali Zafar, 2011
- "Ffun", by Con Funk Shun, 1977
- "Fun", by Brick, from their eponymous album, 1977
- "FUN!"by More More Jump,2025

=== Other uses in arts, entertainment, and media ===
- "F.U.N." (SpongeBob SquarePants), an episode
- Fun Channel, a Middle Eastern TV channel
- ProSieben Fun, a German pay television channel
- Fun (film), a 1994 Canadian film
- Fun – Can Be Dangerous Sometimes, 2005 Indian film
- Fun (magazine), 1861-1901
- Fun Radio (disambiguation)
- Little Miss Fun, in the Little Miss books

== Brands and enterprises ==
- Six Flags Entertainment Corporation, stock symbol FUN, an American amusement park operator
- Fun Cinemas, a cinema chain in India
- Fun Publications, an American comic book publisher
- FUN Technologies, an online game company

== Transportation ==
- Air Creation Fun, a series of ultralight aircraft
- Fun 23, a French sailboat design
- Funafuti International Airport, in Tuvalu

== Other uses ==
- Field with one element (F_{un})
- Fulniô language
- Function (computer science)
- France Université Numérique, an MOOC provider
- Future University Hakodate, a public university in Hokkaido, Japan
- Proposed denomination of Japanese Meiji period coinage

== See also ==
- Faun (disambiguation)
- Fawn (disambiguation)
- Fon (disambiguation)
