= Fawn River =

Fawn River may refer to the following places:

In Canada:

- Fawn River (Ontario)

In the United States:

- Fawn River (Michigan)
- Fawn River Township, Michigan

== See also ==
- Fawn (disambiguation)
