= Fawn (disambiguation) =

A fawn is a young deer.

Fawn may also refer to:

== Places ==
=== Canada ===
- Fawn Island
- Fawn Lake, Alberta, a locality
- Fawn River (Ontario), Kenora District, Northwestern Ontario

=== United States ===
- Fawn, Missouri
- Fawn Grove, Pennsylvania
- Fawn Lake (New York)
- Fawn Lake Township, Minnesota
- Fawn Pond (Massachusetts)
- Fawn River (Michigan)
- Fawn River Township, Michigan
- Fawn Township, Allegheny County, Pennsylvania
- Fawn Township, York County, Pennsylvania
- Rising Fawn, Georgia

== Other uses ==
- Fawn River State Fish Hatchery, a historic hatchery near Orland, Indiana
- Fawn (colour)
- Fairey Fawn, a British single-engine light bomber of the 1920s
- Fleet Fawn, a single-engine, two-seat training aircraft produced in the 1930s
- HMS Fawn, the name of several ships in the British Navy
- The Fawn (album), by The Sea and Cake
- Parasitaster, or The Fawn, a 1604 play by John Marston
- USS Fawn, American Civil War steamer
- Fawn, a Disney Fairies franchise character
- Florida Automated Weather Network, established in 1998
- Fawning, a physiological reaction in the fight-flight-freeze-or-fawn model

== People with the name ==
- Fawn (given name)
- James Fawn (1847–1923), British music hall comic entertainer

== See also ==
- Faun (disambiguation)
- Fon (disambiguation)
- Phon, a unit of loudness
