= Lake James (Indiana) =

Lake in Indiana, United States

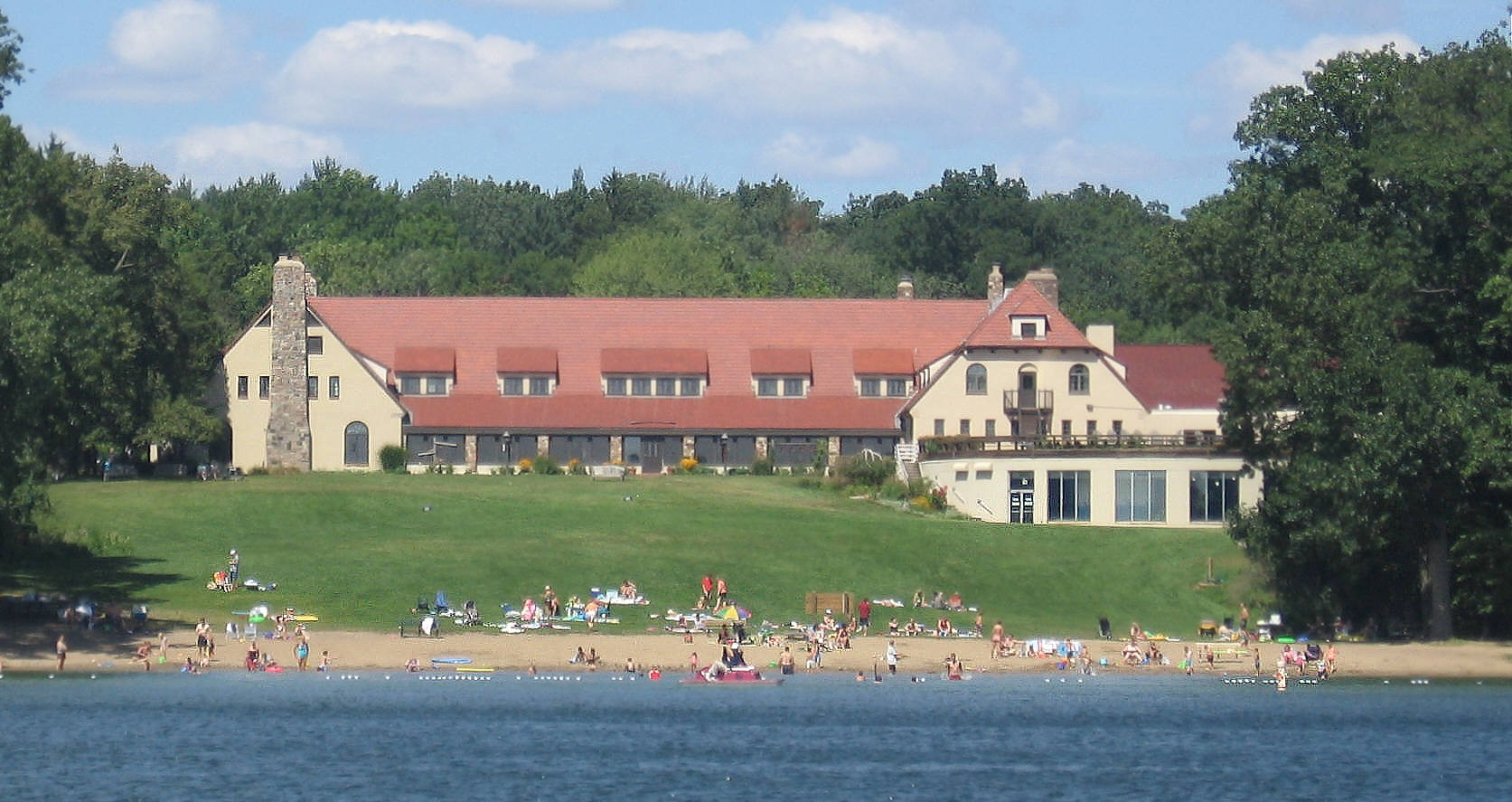
- Pokagon State Park's Potawatomi Inn on the First Basin of Lake James

- Location within Indiana Location within the United States
- Location: Steuben County, Indiana
- Coordinates: 41°42′00″N 85°02′20″W
- Type: mesotrophic glacial lake
- Primary inflows: 3 creeks (largest is Croxton Ditch) plus minor tributaries
- Primary outflows: Jimmerson Creek, located between Lake James and Jimmerson Lake
- Catchment area: 4,322 acres (1,749 ha)
- Basin countries: United States
- Max. length: 2 mi (3.2 km)
- Max. width: 1 mi (1.6 km)
- Surface area: 1,228.56 acres (497.18 ha)
- Average depth: 27 ft (8.2 m)
- Max. depth: 88 ft (27 m)
- Water volume: 33,171.22 acre⋅ft (40,916,100 m^{3})
- Residence time: 312 days
- Shore length^{1}: 17.5 mi (28.2 km)
- Surface elevation: 965 ft (294 m)
- Islands: Kemery Island
- References: Lake Diagnostic Study
- ^{1} Shore length is not a well-defined measure.

Lake James is a natural lake located in the northeast corner of the state of Indiana in the United States. It is popular as a place for boating and fishing and has a wide variety of wildlife. As the state's fourth-largest natural lake, it has over 1,200 acres (490 ha) of surface water, and consists of three basins. Its water quality is ranked among the best in Indiana lakes. The lake is the largest of a group of lakes known as the James Lake Chain. These lakes are located mostly in Steuben County, Indiana, but also extend into southern Michigan.

During the 1700s the lake was part of a huge swamp that was the hunting grounds for the Potawatomi Indians. As European fur traders made wild game scarce, the Indians were persuaded to sell their land and move west. Pokagon State Park, located along all three of the lake's basins, is named in honor of two Potawatomi leaders: Simon Pokagon and his father Leopold. The park, with grounds of more than 1,200 acres (490 ha), is open all year. Camping sites are available, and the park features hiking trails, a toboggan, and two beaches. The park's Potawatomi Inn faces the north side of the lake's lower basin.

Lake James was named by surveyor James Watson Riley. It was first surveyed in 1831 by E. H. Lytle, and settlement began shortly thereafter. Settlement around the lake was initially slow, as there were no roads that provided access. The construction of a small railroad between the city of Angola and the lake's southern tip spurred development, as visitors could ride a train to Angola and connect to the lake. After arriving at the lake by train, many of the original cottage owners took a boat to their cottage. With the exception of Pokagon State Park and a private campground, nearly all of the lake's shoreline is now developed. Much of the development consists of cottages and homes, which began over 100 years ago. Two additional lakes of significant size, Jimmerson Lake and Snow Lake, are connected to Lake James. Water from these lakes flows west, and eventually reaches Lake Michigan.

== Description ==
Lake James is a glacial lake located in the northeastern corner of the state of Indiana. The lake occupies an area west of Interstate highway 69 in Indiana's Steuben County, which borders Michigan and Ohio. The city of Angola is located about 3 miles (5 km) southeast of the lake's southern tip. The northern half of Lake James is in the county's Jamestown Township, while the southern half is located in Pleasant Township. The lake consists of three sections called the First, Second, and Third Basin, where the First Basin is the southernmost and the Third Basin is the northernmost of the three. (Note: First, Second, and Third are the basin names used in a state report from 1915. Those names were also used by lake residents in their book on the history of the lake. A 2006 study commissioned by three local associations describes the basins as Upper, Middle, and Lower, where the Lower Basin is the southernmost (First) basin.) Snow Lake lies on the north side of the Third (northern) Basin. Although a separate lake today, it was described as one of "four portions" of Lake James in a report from the early 20th century. Vegetation effectively separated Snow Lake from Lake James around the end of the 19th century. Lake James is also the name of an unincorporated community situated on the western side of the lake. The town established a post office in 1851 but was discontinued that same year.

As Indiana's fourth largest natural lake, Lake James is large enough to be the site of a state park and multiple boat ramps. The lake has a surface area of 1,229 acres (497 ha), and about 17.5 miles (28.2 kilometres) of shoreline. Its elevation is 965 feet (294 m). The lake's mean depth is 27 feet (8.2 m). All three basins are deepest in their center, and the deepest part of the lake is 88 feet (27 m). All three basins also have sunken islands, and an island in the First Basin remains above the water level.

The island located in the First Basin is about 200 feet (61 metres) from the shore on the south side of the lake. During the early 20th century it was known as Kemery Island. It has one cottage, a pier, and several trees. (Note: Miles describes the location of this island, but misspells its name as "Kimery". Somers and Cupp show a map from the 1934 Indiana Official Lake Guide that uses the spelling "Kemery". They also say the island was purchased in 1899 by George Kemery. This island can be seen from the Lake James Association webcam. The first view is of the First Basin, and the island can be seen in the left half of the picture.) Lake James has two other islands that might be more appropriately described as an islet and a tidal island. A small islet can be found near what was Bledsoe's Beach on the west side of the Second Basin near Jimmerson Creek. This tiny island is unofficially known as Goat Island. The small piece of land was not originally an island but became one as erosion created a channel on its west side. Beginning in 1969, and continuing into the 1970s, goats were left on the island during the summer to "mow" the vegetation. The practice of using goats to groom the island was discontinued later in the 1970s, but locals still call the tiny piece of land "Goat Island". The lake's Third Basin has a residential subdivision known as Eagle Island. This tidal island is located on the north side of the Third Basin and is connected to the mainland by wetlands and marshes. A group of about 10 cottages on the island are accessed via a causeway.

== History ==
Most of the native Potawatomi Indians left the region in 1830. Lake James and the surrounding area were originally surveyed in 1831 by E. H. Lytle. The lake was named by another surveyor, James Riley. It is not certain if Riley was Captain James Riley or his son, James Watson Riley—both were surveyors. James Watson Riley also had a son, James Watson Riley Jr. It is not known why the lake was named Lake James, but a logical assumption is that the name honors one (or more) of the three James Riley men.

=== First inhabitants ===
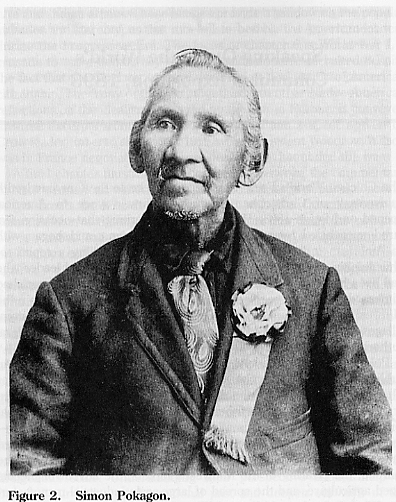
Simon Pokagon

The oldest known people with sustained civilizations in Indiana are the Woodland Indians. These mound builders lived in what would become Indiana from approximately 1,000 BC to 900 AD. These Native American tribes disappeared, and were replaced by other tribes during the 1700s. In future northeast Indiana, the new tribes were the Miami and Potawatomi Indians. The Lake James area was the hunting grounds of the Potawatomi Indians, who managed the land and wildlife with periodic controlled burns.

Following an 1830 treaty, most of the Potawatomi moved west, although the Pokagon Band of Potawatomi Indians, led by Leopold Pokagon, negotiated an agreement that enabled them to stay in southern Michigan. Pokagon State Park, located on Lake James, is named in honor of chief Leopold Pokagon and his son Simon. The park's size is 1,260 acres (510 ha) and is adjacent to all three basins of Lake James—and Lake Snow. The park has two beaches with swimming areas on Lake James. One beach is located in front of the park's Potawatomi Inn, which faces the north side of the lake's First (or Lower) Basin. The other beach (and bath house) can be found on the southeastern shore of the lake's Third (or Upper) Basin.

=== Settlement ===
Settlement of the area started after the surveys of the 1830s, but the population growth was slow because access roads were limited. The nearby community of Jamestown had a population of only 779 by 1870. In 1875 Lake James was described as "remarkably clear and free from mineral matter" with water having a "pleasant taste" and "neutral to litmus paper". By that time, the lake was well known for good fishing. Cottages began appearing on Lake James during the end of the 19th century. A portion of Spring Point, located on the west side of the lake where the First and Second basins meet, was platted in 1895. Settlement accelerated when an electric railway connected the city of Angola with the southernmost shore of the lake's First Basin, known as Paltytown.

=== Railway ===
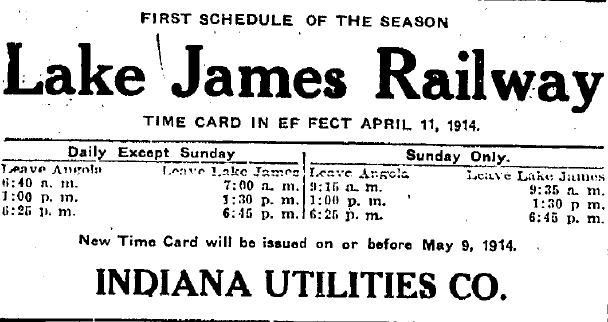
Train schedule from 1914

The Ohio & Indiana Railway Company was incorporated in 1903. During the same year, a 3-mile (4.8 km) line was built from the New York Central Railroad station in the nearby city of Angola to the southern tip of Lake James. Following difficulties in acquiring rolling stock, additional financial backers joined the company and renamed it the Angola Railway and Power Company—although the railroad was always known as the Lake James Electric Railway. Rolling stock totaled only three pieces of equipment: two electric passenger cars and an open trailer.

Regular passenger service began on July 14, 1904. The railroad closed during the winter months and typically provided service from April until November. The line was lengthened by 0.75 miles (1.21 km) in 1904, connecting Angola's New York Central station with the heart of the business district. The company also built a dance hall, hotel, and amusement park at Paltytown.

By 1914 Paltytown was described as "several cottages, a supply store, a photo gallery and dancing pavilion, and the Lake James Hotel." Two piers were located at the beach, and boats were available for rent. In many cases, people reached their cottages on the lake by taking a train to Angola and then taking the electric railway to the lake. From Paltytown, they could reach their cottage by boat.

The Lake James Electric Railway was rarely profitable and never expanded after the 1904 extension. A reorganized version of the company was renamed Indiana Utilities Company in 1912. The last regularly scheduled trip made by the railroad was on October 15, 1918. The railroad was dismantled and its properties sold in 1919. The Paltytown properties were sold in 1922. Better roads and the automobile made the railroad obsolete, but it played a key role in the lake's development. In 1928 another group agreed to purchase the Paltytown properties, and the former resort became the Lake James Christian Assembly.

=== Mail ===
In 1927 the United States Postal Service announced that it would provide mail delivery service to lakefront residents of Lake James using boats. Delivery by boat was provided all summer, six days per week. By the 1950s, Lake James was thought to be the only "fresh-water delivery route on an inland lake in the United States with a cottage-to-cottage delivery by speedboat." Summer service was provided from June 1 through September 15 to lakefront properties with mailboxes at the end of their piers. About 200 residences received letters, packages, and newspapers. Stamps were sold directly from the boat. During peak times, delivery could take as long as four hours using a boat powered by a 25-horsepower motor.

=== Bledsoe's Beach ===
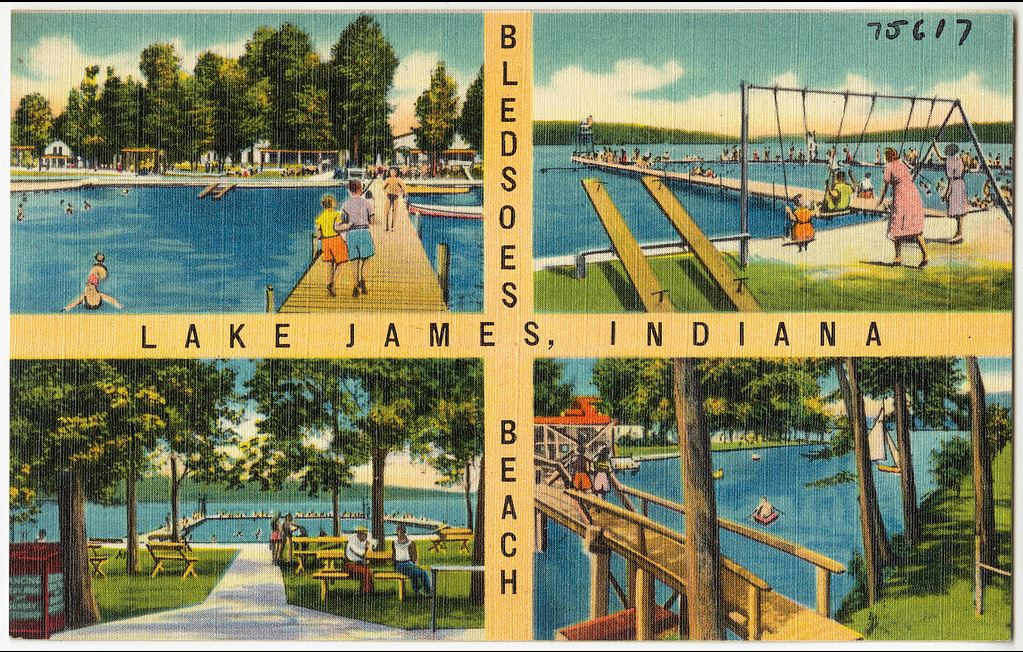
Postcard for Bledsoe's Beach circa 1930–45. Part of Boston Public Library's Tichnor Brothers Collection

Bledsoe's Beach, located on Lake James near its intersection with Jimmerson Lake, became a popular nightspot during the 20th century. The resort eventually included a dance hall, a cocktail lounge, a hotel, a pier and swimming area, a golf course, and a recreational vehicle park. Beginning in the 1960s, Bledsoe's Beach was also the summer home of the Hoosier Basketball Camp, which was originally directed by Indiana University basketball coach Branch McCracken. In 1938, advertisements for Bledsoe's Beach proclaimed "dancing every Saturday Night". Ten years later, advertisements were proclaiming dancing every night except Monday. During the early 1960s Bledsoe's Beach was described as "the Midwest's Favorite Fun Spot", with live music and record hops featuring disc jockeys from radio station WOWO, one of the most powerful radio stations in the Midwest. In 2011 the property was sold at auction. A restaurant opened on the site in 2013 with lake views and dock space for customers arriving by boat.

=== Major accidents ===
Lake James has been the site of a plane crash and a rare hang gliding fatality. (Note: Although numerous injuries occur from hang gliding, deaths are infrequent. For example, four deaths were reported to the United States Hang Gliding Association in 1994 for at least 50,000 participants.) In 1971 a Piper Tri-Pacer crashed into Lake James, killing the pilot. The plane was flying at low altitude when a wing hit the water about 500 feet (150 m) from the shore. The wing was torn off, and the plane plunged into water about 85 feet (26 m) deep. Another fatality happened in 1972, when a hang-glider was killed. The kite was being pulled by a boat when the flyer lost control, causing the kite (and flyer) to plummet about 60 feet (18 m) before striking the surface of the lake. The lake has also been the site of accidents involving thin ice. An example transpired in January 1985 when four snowmobiles broke through thin ice, and three people drowned.

== Watershed ==
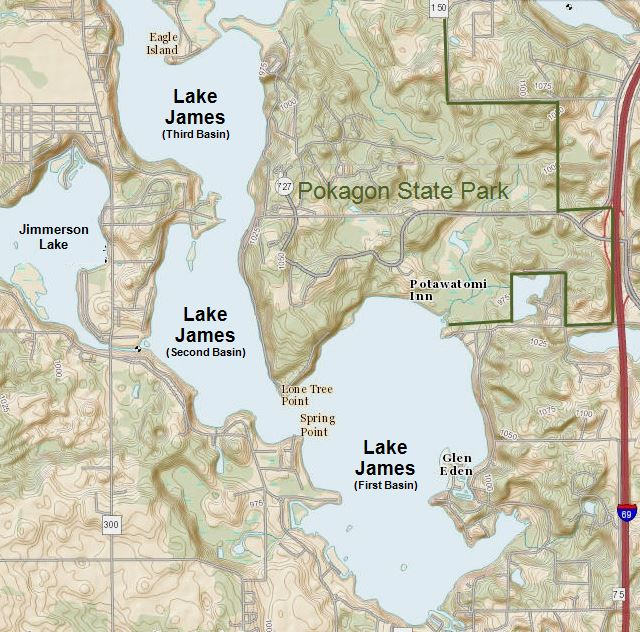
The three basins of Lake James and the east side of Jimmerson Lake

Lake James and other lakes nearby were formed by glaciers approximately 10,000 years ago near the end of the Pleistocene era. Many northern Indiana lakes were formed as pieces of large glaciers broke off and became buried in the land as the main glaciers retreated north. Eventually, these large pieces of ice melted and filled the depressions in the land they originally occupied, creating numerous lakes and marshes.

Lake James has a catchment area of 4,322 acres (1,749 ha). Its primary tributaries are Croxton Ditch, the Sowles Bay inlet, and the Whisper Bay inlet. Croxton Ditch is the largest, and flows into the First Basin from the south side at a rate of 61.74 cubic feet per minute (1.748 m^{3}/min). The Sowles Bay and Whisper Bay inlets also flow into the Lower Basin, entering from the southeast and west sides, respectively. The Whisper Bay inlet flows at 26.61 cubic feet per minute (0.754 m^{3}/min), while the inlet at Sowles Bay flows at 4.17 cubic feet per minute (0.118 m^{3}/min). The primary inflow for the Third Basin is a short channel from Snow Lake on the basin's north side. Water from the First and Third basins flows to the Second Basin, where it exits the lake on the west side through a short channel named Jimmerson Creek that enters Jimmerson Lake. The lake's mean hydraulic retention time is 312 days.

=== James chain ===
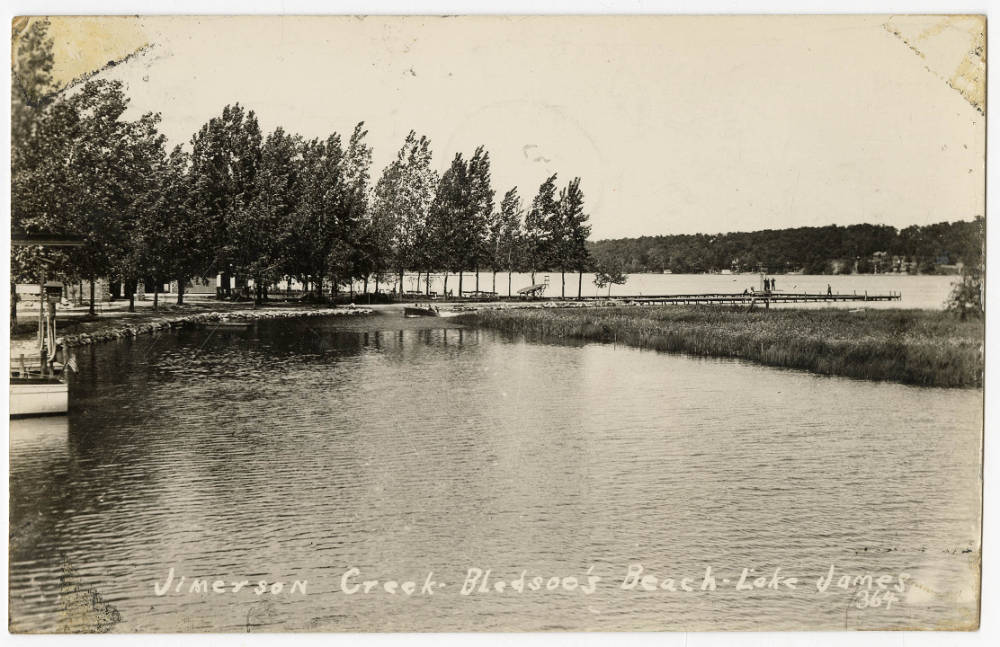
Jimerson Creek, Bledsoe's Beach, Lake James in 1936

Lake James is part of the James Lake Chain which consists of a group of glacial lakes located in the northeastern corner of Indiana and part of Michigan. Lake James is the largest lake in this group of lakes, and also the fourth largest natural lake in Indiana. (Note: Other major lakes in this chain are Lake George, Snow Lake, Big Otter Lake, Little Otter Lake, Hyuck Lake, Walter's Lakes, and Fish Lake. The watershed for this group of lakes also contains additional smaller lakes.) The drainage basin for this chain of lakes is 26,290 acres (10,640 ha). The northern boundary of this region is the community of Kinderhook, Michigan, and the southern boundary is just north of Angola, Indiana. The eastern boundary is on the east side of Fremont, Indiana, and the western side is just west of Lake James. Most of this region is within Indiana's Steuben County. The James Lake Chain watershed drains westward through the Middle Basin of Lake James into Jimmerson Lake, which is part of another watershed. Water from Jimmerson Lake continues westward over a dam at Nevada Mills, forming Crooked Creek. This creek flows northwest, becoming the Fawn River. Eventually, the Fawn River joins the St. Joseph River, which empties into Lake Michigan near the city of Constantine, Michigan.

== Water quality ==
The U.S. Environmental Protection Agency (EPA) classified Lake James as a mesotrophic lake in 1973, meaning that it had an intermediate level of nutrient enrichment. The EPA sampled the lake's water in May, August, and October of that year. Water temperature for Lake James ranged from 46.4 to 78.4 °F (8.0 to 25.8 °C) in early August, and averaged 62.2 °F (16.8 °C) for all of the samples taken that day. The lake's pH ranged between 7.3 and 8.5, with an average of 7.8. Dissolved oxygen is necessary for fish and other water organisms, and most fish need 3 to 5 milligrams per liter. The concentration of dissolved oxygen in Lake James ranged from 0.0 to 8.8 milligrams per liter for various depths during early August, and averaged 4.6.

Nutrients such as phosphorus and forms of nitrogen are essential for plants, yet excess amounts can result in lower dissolved oxygen. The EPA found the phosphorus concentration in Lake James ranged from 0.013 to 0.219 milligrams per liter, and averaged 0.040. Total concentration of nitrogen in the lake's waters ranged from 0.540 to 1.890 milligrams per liter, with a mean of 1.007. The concentration of ammonia ranged from 0.040 to 1.22 milligrams per liter and had a mean average of 0.250. Another measure of water quality is Secchi Disk Transparency. This measure is the depth at which a Secchi disk can be seen, and the depth is reduced by particles in the water such as algae and sediment. The Sechhi depth of the lake averaged 2.7 metres (8.9 ft) in August, although the depth was deeper in May and October. The overall water quality for Lake James ranked 3rd best of the 27 Indiana lakes tested by the EPA that year.

The mesotrophic classification was confirmed in 2005 by additional studies. (Note: Indiana uses a water quality measurement called the Indiana Trophic State Index. Lake James scored 46 on this index in 2005, putting it in the upper level of the mesotrophic category—meaning that it had an intermediate level of nutrient enrichment. However, the major reason the lake scored in the upper level was algae. Because of improvements in algae measurements compared to when the index was developed, the firm analyzing the study believes the lake nutrient level is probably rated too high—and should have a better (lower nutrient) score.) During the ten years prior to 2006, a new waste water plant was constructed, connecting nearly all the homes on Lake James to off-site waste treatment facilities. This removes a significant portion of nutrient loading in the lake and should have a positive impact on future water quality.

== Climate ==
Historical weather data is available for Angola, Indiana, which is about 3 miles (5 km) from Lake James. Angola averages about 7.5 days when the high temperature is 90 °F (32 °C) or higher. It also typically has about 13.3 days when the low temperature is 0 °F (−18 °C) or lower. The record high temperature is 106 °F (41 °C), which was recorded in 1936. The record low temperature is −27 °F (−33 °C), which happened in 1981.

Climate data for Angola, Indiana (3 miles from Lake James)
Month	Jan	Feb	Mar	Apr	May	Jun	Jul	Aug	Sep	Oct	Nov	Dec	Year
Mean daily maximum °F (°C)	30 (−1)	34 (1)	45 (7)	58 (14)	69 (21)	78 (26)	82 (28)	80 (27)	73 (23)	61 (16)	48 (9)	34 (1)	58 (14)
Mean daily minimum °F (°C)	15 (−9)	17 (−8)	25 (−4)	36 (2)	47 (8)	57 (14)	61 (16)	59 (15)	50 (10)	39 (4)	30 (−1)	20 (−7)	38 (3)
Average precipitation inches (mm)	2.28 (58)	2.21 (56)	2.61 (66)	3.37 (86)	4.37 (111)	3.88 (99)	4.00 (102)	4.14 (105)	3.37 (86)	2.95 (75)	3.15 (80)	2.74 (70)	39.07 (994)
Source: The Weather Channel

Northern Indiana lakes freeze during the winter, usually for periods between November 15 and March 15. In a study of Lake James conducted during the 1940s, Lake James was covered by ice from December 15, 1947, to March 21, 1948. The ice reached a maximum thickness of 16 inches (41 cm) at that time. During the study's previous two winters, ice reached a maximum thickness of 8 and 12 inches (20 and 30 cm).

== Plants and animals ==
=== Around the lake ===
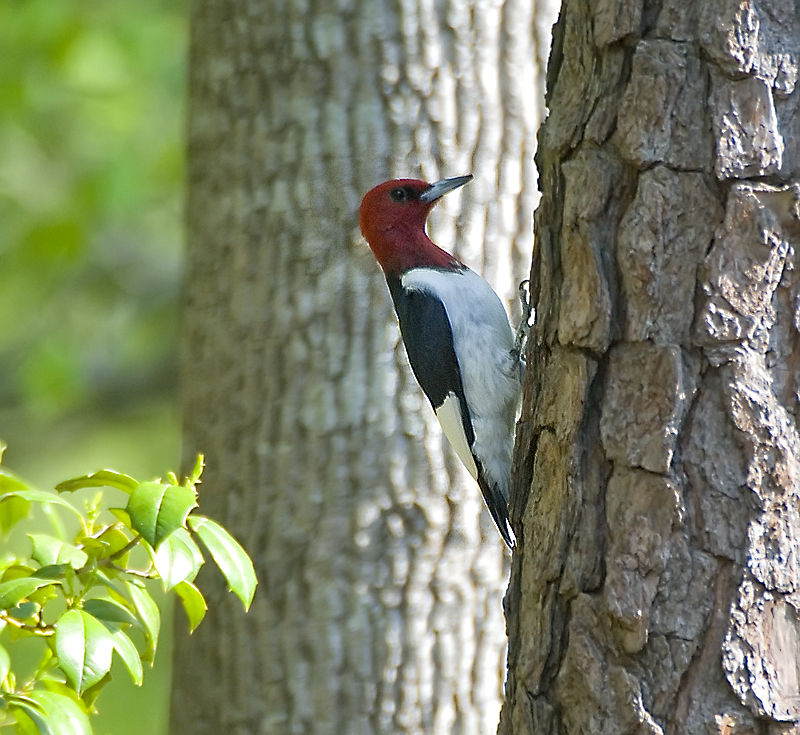
Red-headed woodpecker

Lake James supports a variety of plants and animals, as it has woodlands and wetlands adjacent to its waters. Pokagon State Park, originally named Lake James State Park when it was proposed in 1925, is located by the lake. As of 2003, the park's forest consists of sugar and red maple trees, and has an average density of 155 trees per 1 acre (0.40 ha). The park has its own swamps and marshes - many are spring-fed. A variety of animals can be found in the park and surrounding area. A partial list of animals found locally includes Blanding's turtles, northern leopard frogs, massasauga rattle-snakes, and the star-nosed mole. White-tailed deer and raccoons have high enough populations that they have to be managed. Beavers, coyotes, and foxes can also be found.

Lake James and the surrounding lakes are the home for a variety of birds. Common birds such as ducks, geese, gulls, and purple martins can be found when the lake is not frozen. Migrating birds such as loons, grebes, and double-crested cormorants can also be observed, typically during autumn. Hawks and red-headed woodpeckers can be seen year around, as can barred and great horned owls. Several bald eagles were sighted on the lake in 2006. Other birds that can be observed, especially around Pokagon State Park, include brown creepers, veeries, several types of warblers, bluebirds, Carolina wrens, Baltimore orioles, and pileated woodpeckers.

=== In the lake ===
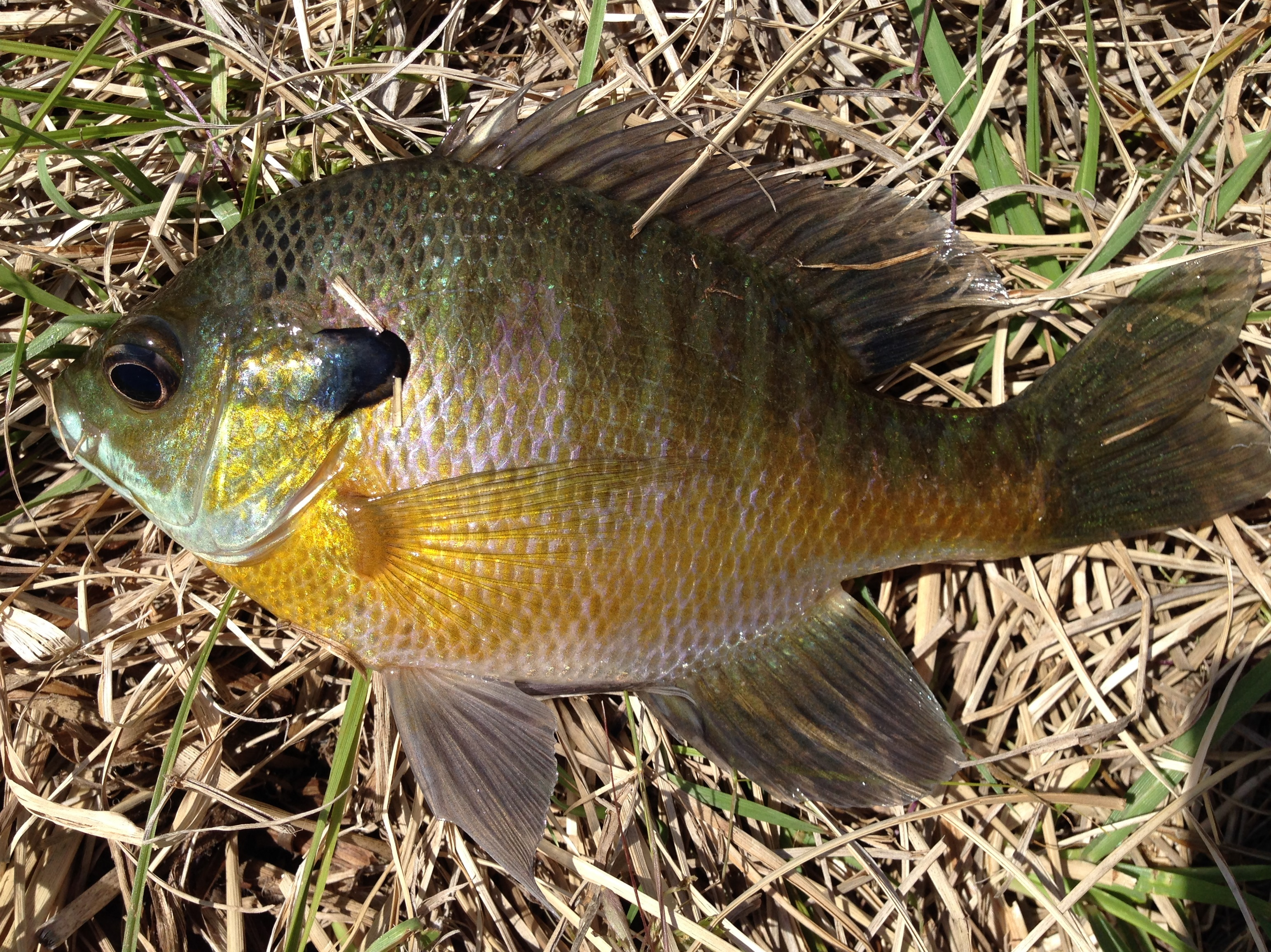
Bluegill

Fishing is popular at Lake James during all seasons. According to surveys conducted by the Indiana Department of Natural Resources in 1975, 1989, and 2000, the lake has about 20 species of fish. Excluding the small minnow brook silversides, bluegill is the most common species of fish, followed by largemouth bass and rock bass. Yellow bullheads, yellow perch, and redear sunfish can also be found. Northern pike, though not as plentiful as the other species listed above, also live in Lake James.

Lake James has over 20 types of aquatic plants. In a survey conducted by the Indiana Department of Natural Resources during 2005, 23 types of submersed plants were found—plus two types of floating plants. The type of plant found is generally dependent upon the water depth. Most plants are found at depths of 4.5 feet (1.4 metres) to 12 feet (3.7 metres). At depths of 1.5 feet (0.46 metres) to 4.5 feet (1.4 metres), the dominant vegetation is chara, a plant-like type of algae. Beyond depths of 4.5 feet (1.4 metres) but less than 7 feet (2.1 metres), Illinois pondweed, Vallisneria, and Sago pondweed tend to be the dominant plants. Variable watermilfoil are the plants typically found at depths of 7 feet (2.1 metres) to 15 feet (4.6 metres). Beyond 15 feet (4.6 metres), chara is usually the only vegetation, and it has been found growing as deep as 36.5 feet (11.1 metres). Most plants found in the lake are native species that are useful for providing food and habitat for fish and waterfowl.

== Recreation ==
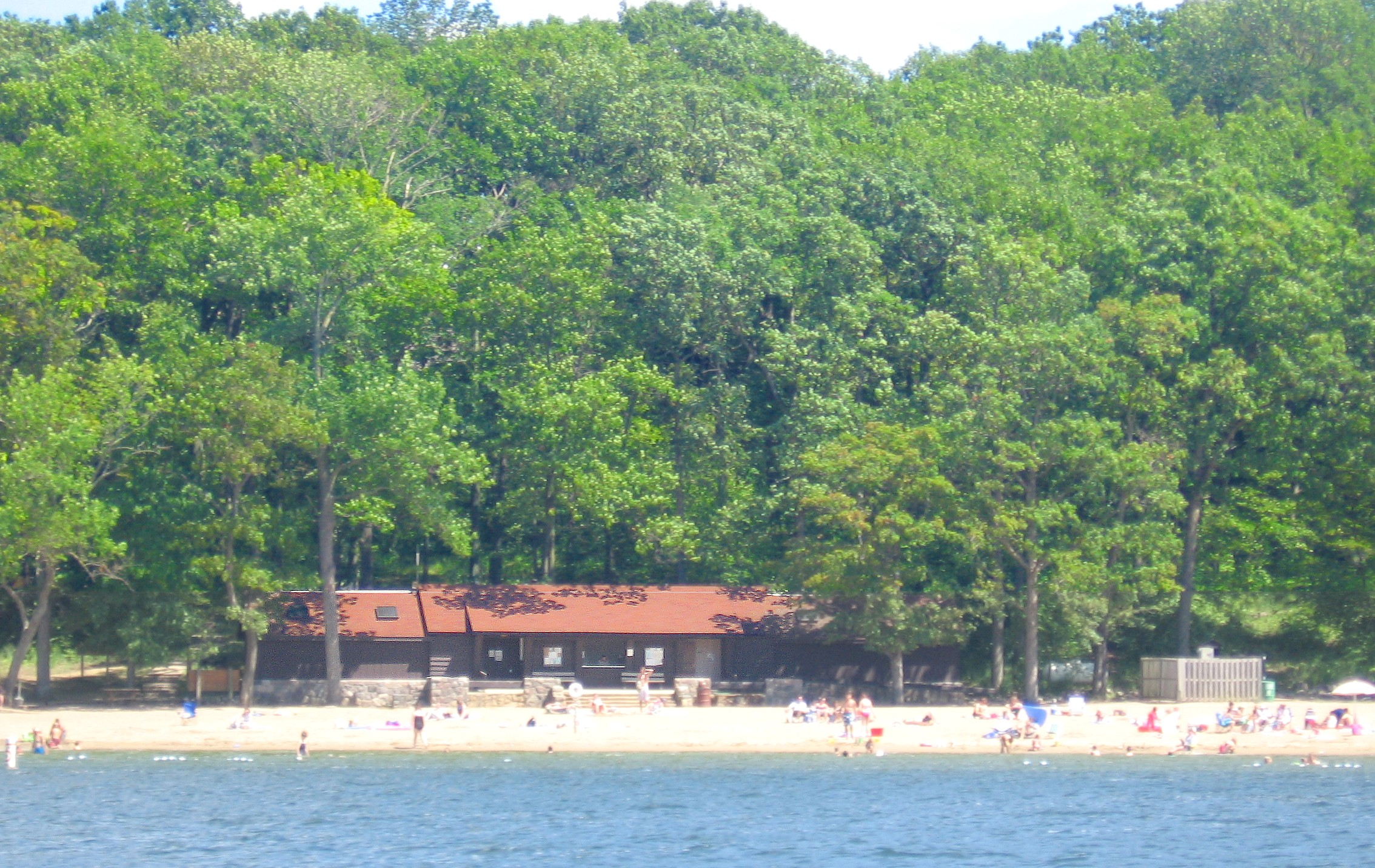
Pokagon State Park's Beach house on the Third Basin of Lake James

In addition to being the home of Pokagon State Park and the Lake James Christian Assembly, Lake James is known for boating and fishing. A sandbar in the First Basin, not far from the Potawatomi Inn, has been a popular boat gathering place. In a survey conducted in 2005, over 60 percent of the lake's residents who participated in the survey listed fishing, fast boating, and water skiing as their preferred activities. Boating has become so popular that some residents have become concerned about overcrowding during the summer weekends. During August 2005 the number of boats docked on the lake totaled about 2,000. Ski boats, cabin cruisers, deck boats, and fishing boats accounted for 36 percent of the total. Pontoon boats accounted for 22 percent of the total, and personal water crafts were another 17 percent. The remaining watercraft were sailboats, canoes, kayaks, row boats and any boats that did not fit in a category.

Nearly all of the lake's shoreline, with the exception of Pokagon State Park, has been developed. Many residents have owned property on the lake for over 20 years. Lakefront properties are available for purchase, with a wide variety of styles and prices—including homes valued above $1 million. Residents and visitors can participate in weekly sailboat races sponsored by the Lake James Yacht Club. The lake is also the site of special events. The 4th of July is celebrated with a boat parade followed by fireworks. Each September, the Seaplane Pilots Association sponsors a Seaplane Splash-In in the lower basin not far from the Potawatomi Inn.

== See also ==
- List of lakes in Indiana
