= Jimmerson Lake, Indiana =

- Census-designated place
- Location within Indiana Location within the United States
- Coordinates: 41°42′28″N 85°03′48″W
- Country: United States
- State: Indiana
- County: Steuben
- Townships: Jamestown, Pleasant

Area
  - Total: 2.25 sq mi (5.8 km^{2})
  - Land: 1.72 sq mi (4.5 km^{2})
  - Water: 0.53 sq mi (1.4 km^{2})
- Elevation: 965 ft (294 m)
- Time zone: UTC-5 (Eastern (EST))
  - Summer (DST): UTC-4 (EDT)
- ZIP codes: 46703 (Angola); 46737 (Fremont)
- Area code: 260
- FIPS code: 18-38547
- GNIS feature ID: 2830544

Jimmerson Lake is an unincorporated community and census-designated place (CDP) in Steuben County, Indiana, United States.

== Geography ==
The community is in northern Steuben County, surrounding Jimmerson Lake, one of a chain of lakes. It is 7 miles (11 km) northwest of Angola, the county seat, and 5 miles (8 km) southeast of Orland.

According to the U.S. Census Bureau, the Jimmerson Lake CDP has a total area of 2.25 square miles (5.83 km^{2}), of which 1.72 square miles (4.45 km^{2}) are land and 0.53 square miles (1.37 km^{2}), or 23.60%, are water. Its southeast end receives water via a short channel from Lake James, while its outlet is at its northwest end, into Crooked Creek, which flows west to the Fawn River, a west-flowing tributary of the St. Joseph River leading to Lake Michigan.

== Demographics ==
The United States Census Bureau delineated Jimmerson Lake as a census designated place in the 2022 American Community Survey.
