= Future University =

Future University may refer to:

- Future University Hakodate, Japan
- Future University in Egypt
- The Future University (Sudan)

== See also ==
- Tower Hamlets Summer University, London, England, known as Futureversity
