= Prairie River (Michigan) =

River in Michigan, United States

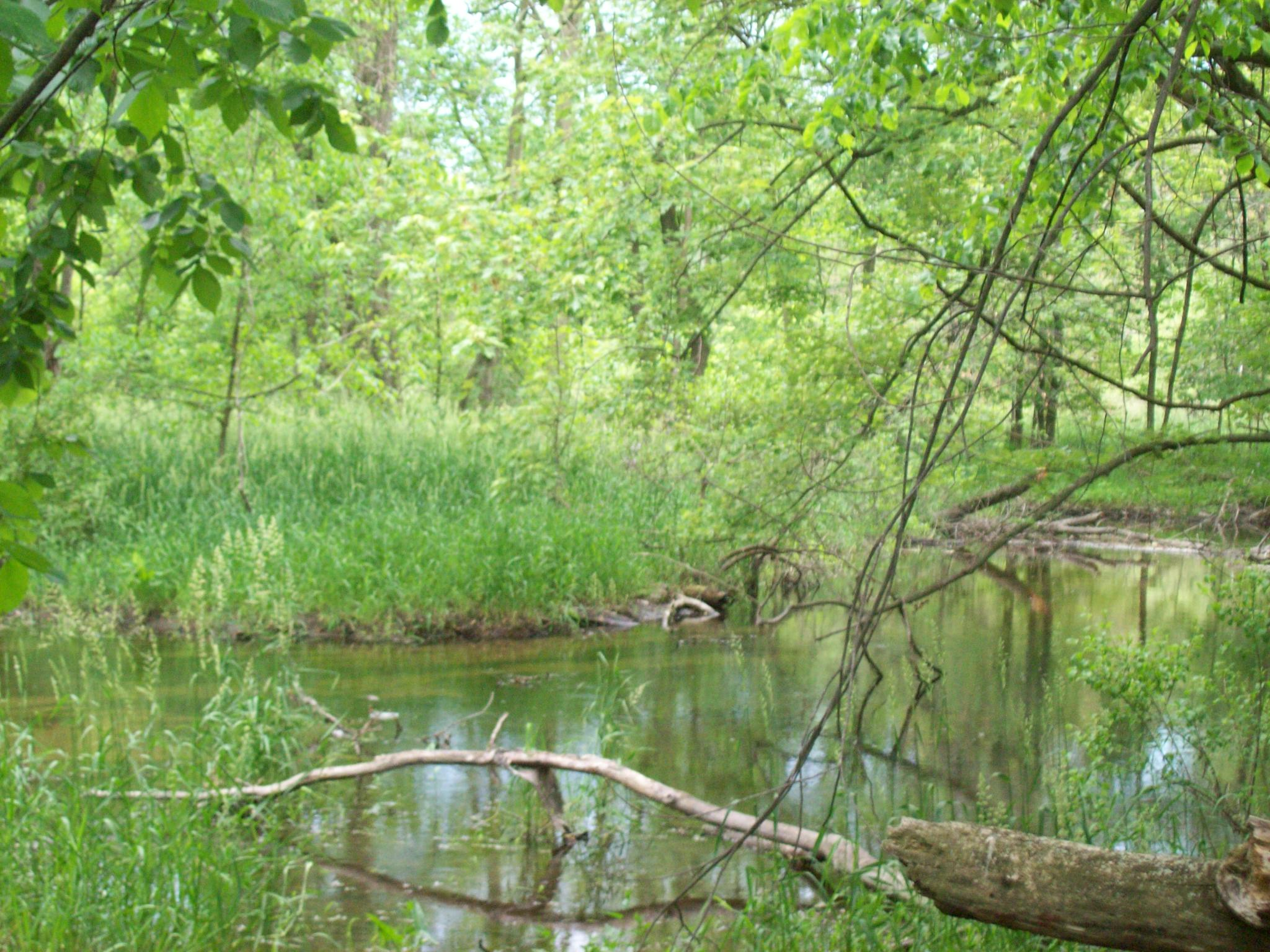

Location
- Country: United States

Physical characteristics
- Source
  - location: Lake Templene
- Mouth
  - location: St. Joseph River at Three Rivers, Michigan
- Length: 54 mi (87 km)
- Discharge
  - location: mouth
  - average: 182.09 cu ft/s (5.156 m^{3}/s) (estimate)

The Prairie River is a small river that flows 54 miles (87 km) through Branch and St. Joseph counties in Michigan. The river rises at 41°48′20″N 85°00′54″W in northern Kinderhook Township in Branch County, and flows west-northwest into the St. Joseph River at 41°54′45″N 85°38′21″W just south of the city of Three Rivers, Michigan.

== Drainage basin ==
The Prairie River drains all or portions of the following:

- Branch County, Michigan
  - Bethel Township
  - Bronson Township
  - Gilead Township
  - Kinderhook Township
  - Noble Township
  - Ovid Township
- St. Joseph County
  - Burr Oak Township
  - Colon Township
  - Fawn River Township
  - Lockport Township
  - Nottawa Township
  - Sherman Township
- Steuben County, Indiana
  - Jamestown Township
  - Millgrove Township

== Tributaries ==
(from the mouth)

- (right) Spring Creek
  - Nottawa Ditch
  - Colon Ditch
    - Washburn Lake
  - Beaver Drain
    - Beaver Lake
- Lake Templene is formed by an impoundment on the river
- (right) outflow from Bryant Lake
- (left) outflow from Perrin Lake
- Prairie River Lake, a natural lake on the river
- (left) outflow from Fish Lake
  - outflow from Hawkins Lake
    - outflow from Eight Foot Lake
      - outflow from Grey Lake
        - outflow from Omena Lake
- (left) Stewart Lake Drain
  - Stewart Lake
- (left) outflow from Lake Pleasant
  - outflow from Lake Michiana (Hog Lake)
- (left) outflow from Dragon Lake,
