= Faun (disambiguation) =

A faun is a half-human, half-goat creature in Roman mythology.

Faun may also refer to:

- Tadano Faun GmbH, a German engineering firm
- Faun (band), a German pagan folk / medieval band
- Faunis, a genus of Asian butterflies commonly referred to as the fauns
- Faun (film), a Hungarian silent film directed by Alexander Korda
- The Faun, a sculpture
- The Faun, ballet composed by Dora Bright
- The Faun, play by Edward Knoblock

== See also ==
- Fawn (disambiguation)
- Fun (disambiguation)
- Fon (disambiguation)
