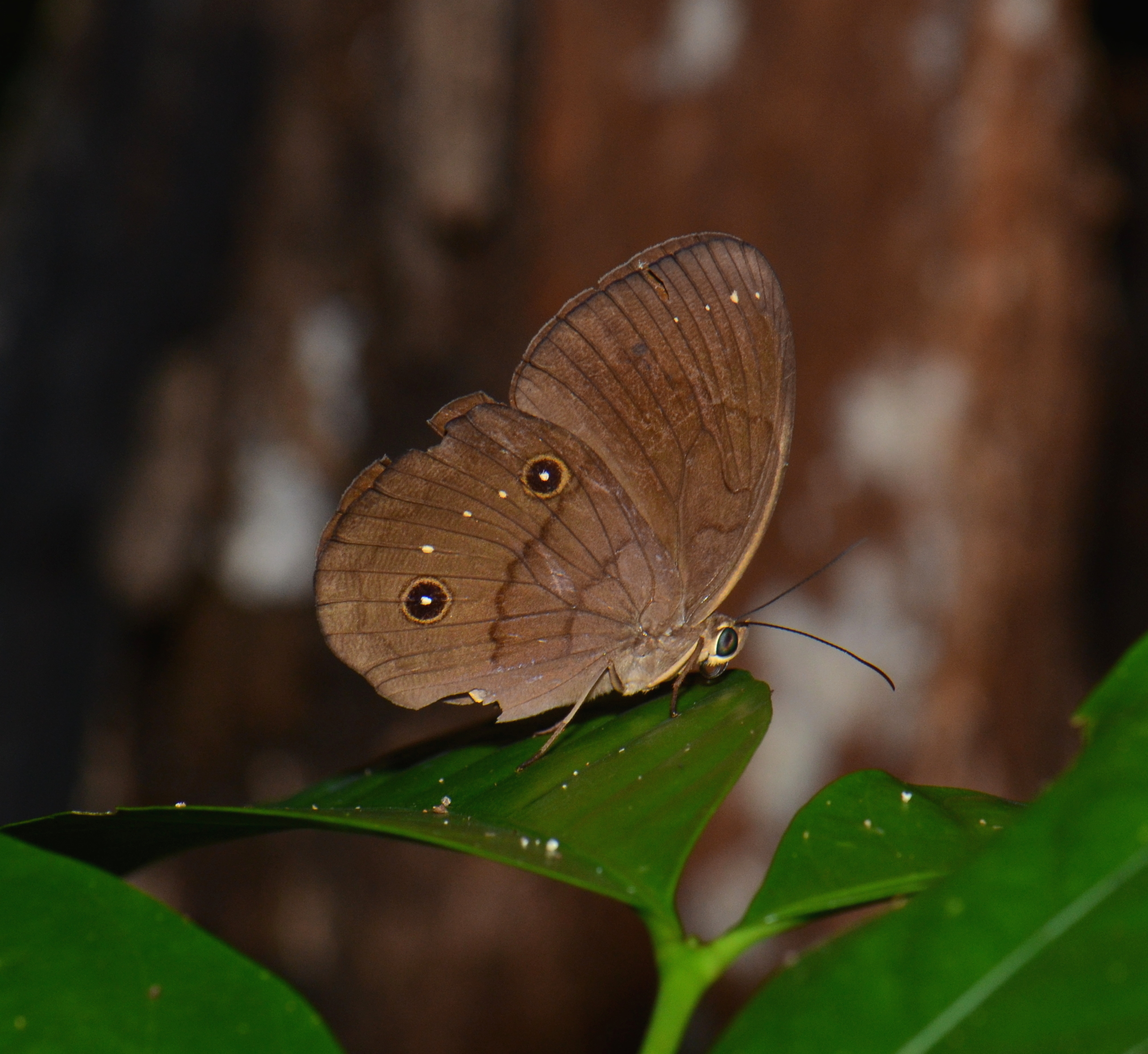

Scientific classification
- Domain: Eukaryota
- Kingdom: Animalia
- Phylum: Arthropoda
- Class: Insecta
- Order: Lepidoptera
- Family: Nymphalidae
- Genus: Faunis
- Species: F. gracilis

Binomial name
- Faunis gracilis (Butler, 1867)

Synonyms
- Clerome gracilis Butler, 1867; adamsi Brooks, 1933

= Faunis gracilis =

Species of butterfly

Faunis gracilis, the narrow striped faun, is a butterfly in the family Nymphalidae. It was described by Arthur Gardiner Butler in 1867. It is found in Sumatra and Malaya in the Indomalayan realm.
