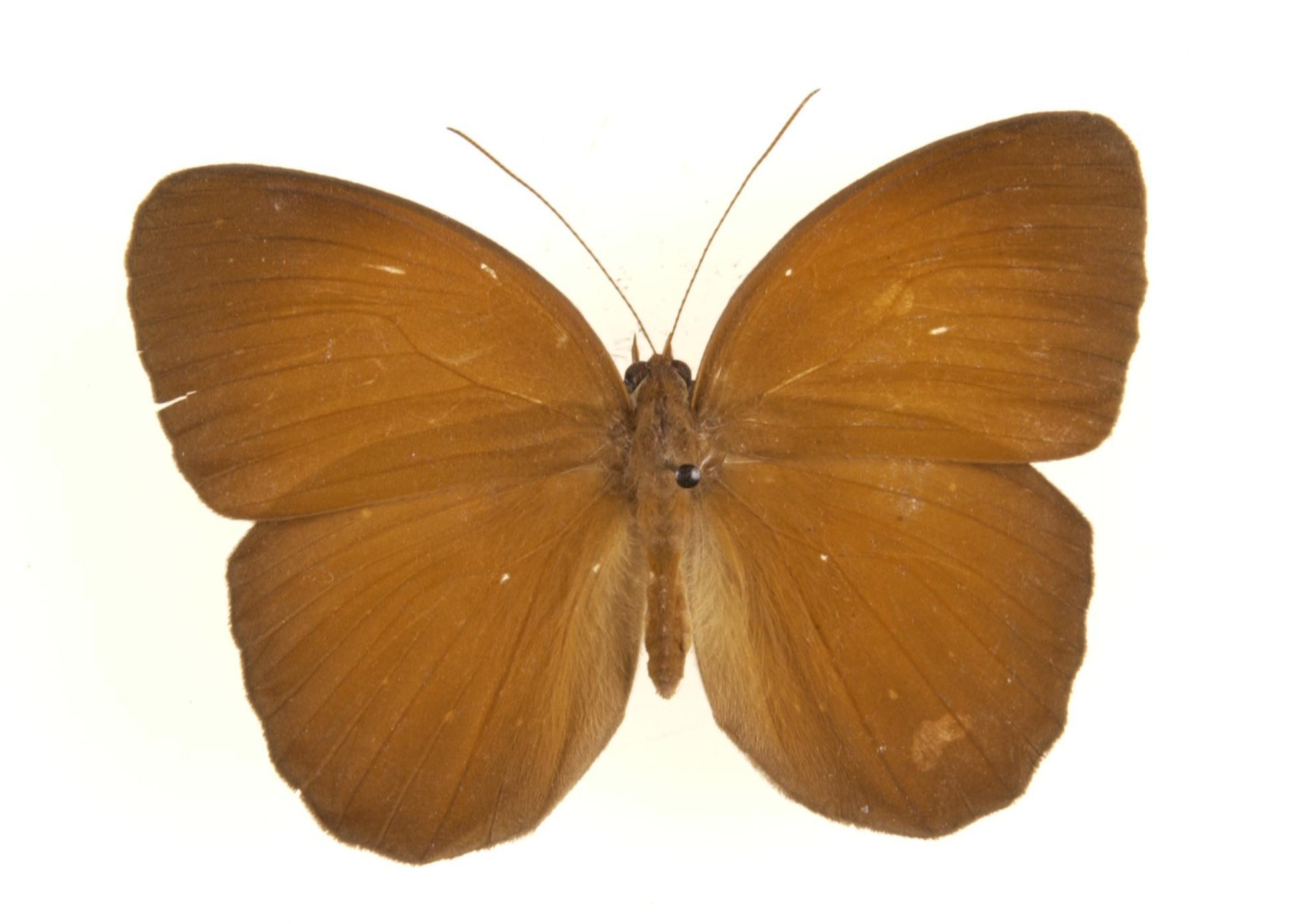
- Faunis canens arcesilaus Stichel, 1933, from Malaya
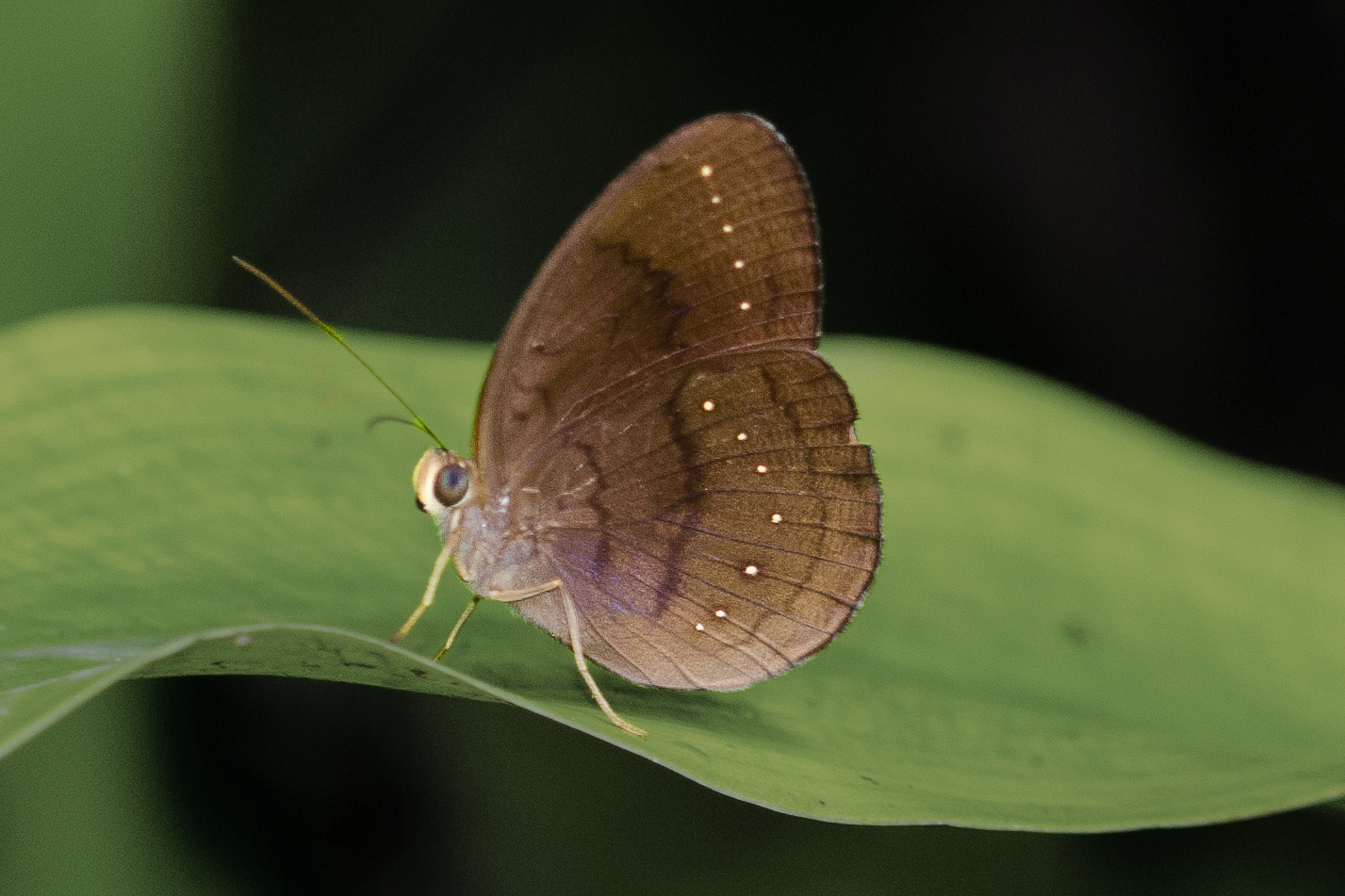

Scientific classification
- Kingdom: Animalia
- Phylum: Arthropoda
- Class: Insecta
- Order: Lepidoptera
- Family: Nymphalidae
- Genus: Faunis
- Species: F. canens

Binomial name
- Faunis canens Hübner, 1826

Synonyms
- See text

= Faunis canens =

Species of butterfly

Faunis canens, the common faun, is a butterfly from South and South East Asia that belongs to the Morphinae, a subfamily of the brush-footed butterflies. This species may include the Indian faun, Faunis arcesilaus.

The common faun ranges from Sikkim to Assam and Myanmar and through Thailand, peninsular Malaya, Singapore to southern Yunnan and the western islands of the Indonesian archipelago. The larva feeds on Musa.
