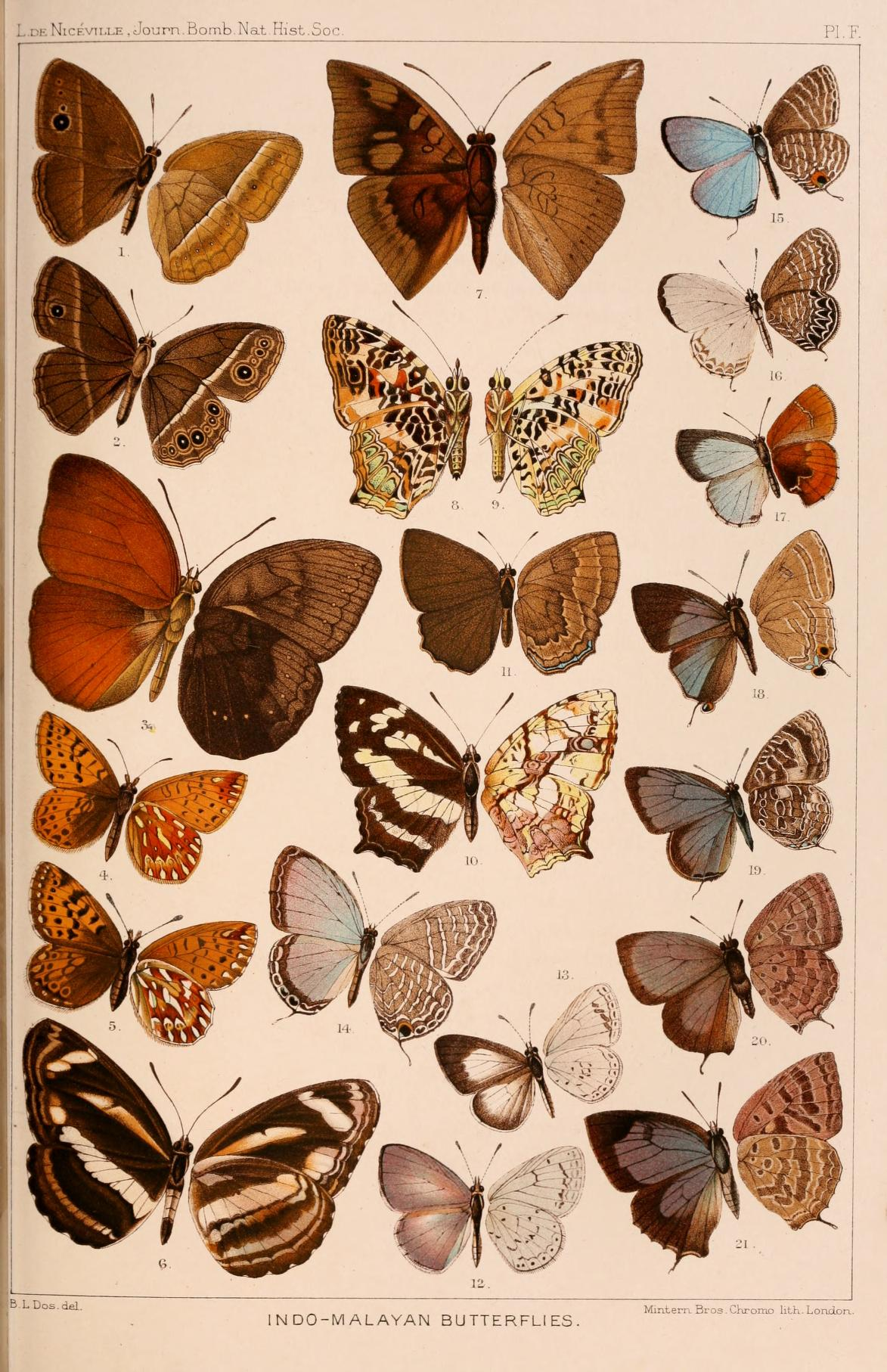
- Figure 3 in de Nicéville's 1891 "On New and Little-Known Butterflies from the Indo-Malayan Region"

Scientific classification
- Domain: Eukaryota
- Kingdom: Animalia
- Phylum: Arthropoda
- Class: Insecta
- Order: Lepidoptera
- Family: Nymphalidae
- Genus: Faunis
- Species: F. kirata

Binomial name
- Faunis kirata de Nicéville, 1891

Synonyms
- Clerome kirata de Nicéville, 1891

= Faunis kirata =

Species of butterfly

Faunis kirata, the broad striped faun, is a butterfly in the family Nymphalidae. It was described by Lionel de Nicéville in 1891. It is found in Peninsular Malaya, Sumatra and Borneo in the Indomalayan realm.
