= Lake Templene =

- Location within the state of Michigan
- Location: St. Joseph County, Michigan
- Coordinates: 41°53′43″N 85°28′03″W
- Type: Reservoir
- Primary inflows: Prairie River
- Primary outflows: Prairie River
- Basin countries: United States
- Surface area: 900 acres (360 ha)
- Surface elevation: 827 ft (252 m)

Lake Templene is a 900-acre (360 ha) artificial lake in St. Joseph County, Michigan. It was created in the early 1970s by damming the Prairie River.

== History ==
In the late 1960s Floyd Templin pursued the idea to dam the Prairie River to create a lake to build houses around. He gathered some investors and proceeded to build a dam.

The lake became popular for fishing tournaments, and this caused a conflict between residents and non-resident fishermen. The Nottawa Township Board of Trustees brokered a compromise. The compromise called for a limit of 25 fishing tournaments per year and the creation of an official public boat launch.

== See also ==
- List of lakes in Michigan
