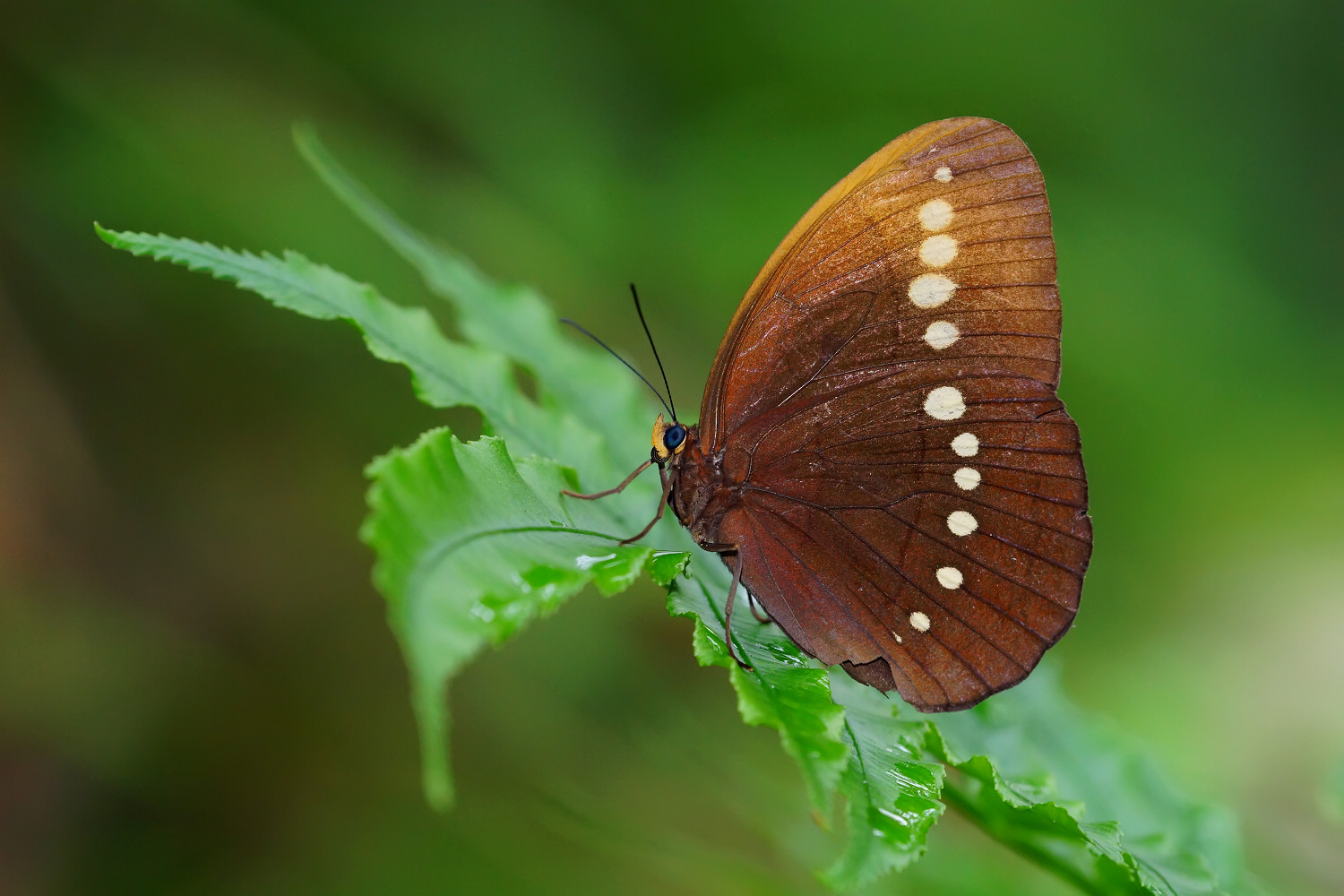

Scientific classification
- Kingdom: Animalia
- Phylum: Arthropoda
- Class: Insecta
- Order: Lepidoptera
- Family: Nymphalidae
- Genus: Faunis
- Species: F. eumeus

Binomial name
- Faunis eumeus (Drury, 1773)

= Faunis eumeus =

Species of butterfly

Faunis eumeus, the large faun, is a butterfly found in South and South East Asia that belongs to the Morphinae subfamily of the brush-footed butterfly family.

The assama subspecies of the large faun is now considered to be a separate species, Faunis assama (Westwood, 1858).

== Distribution ==
The large faun ranges from Assam to the Shan States and Burma.

== Description ==
Upperside of males and females: forewing maroon, with a very broad, oblique, preapical, somewhat diffuse, bright ochraceous band extending from costa to termen and along latter almost to the tornus; this band broader in the female than in the male. Hindwing brown, shading to dark maroon anteriorly. Underside maroon brown; apex of forewing broadly paler, dorsal margin of same dull brown; subbasal, discal and postdiscal dark, sinuous, continuous lines crossing both wings; between the latter two a series of prominent round white spots, five or six on the forewing (straight in the male, slightly incurved in the female), six or seven on the hindwing, arched in both sexes. Antennae, head, thorax and abdomen brown.

== Status ==
The subspecies incerta from the Shan States is reported by William Harry Evans as very rare.
