= Noble Township, Michigan =

- Civil township
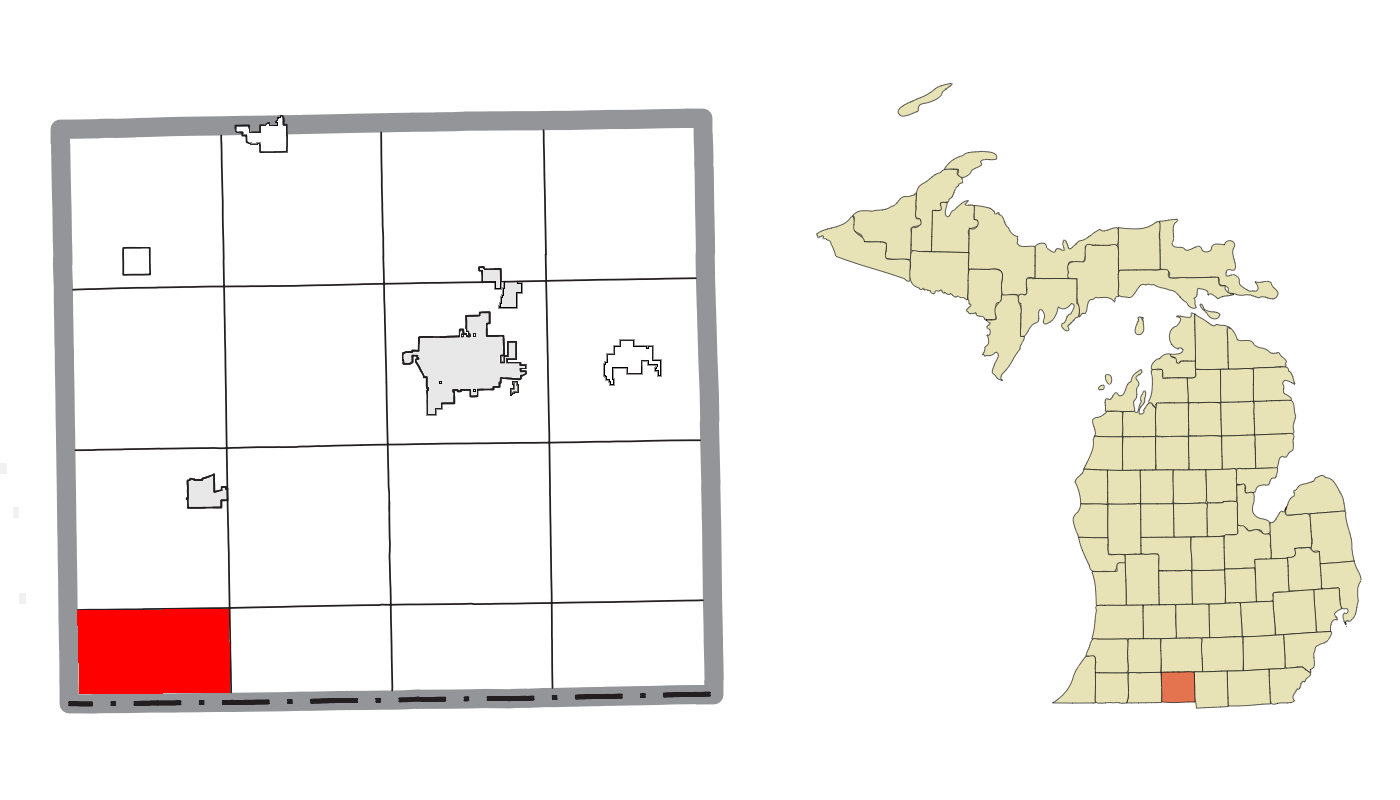
- Location within Branch County

- Location within the state of Michigan Location within the United States
- Coordinates: 41°47′08″N 85°14′44″W
- Country: United States
- State: Michigan
- County: Branch

Area
  - Total: 21.4 sq mi (55.3 km^{2})
  - Land: 21.0 sq mi (54.3 km^{2})
  - Water: 0.39 sq mi (1.0 km^{2})
- Elevation: 925 ft (282 m)

Population (2020)
  - Total: 458
  - Density: 21.8/sq mi (8.43/km^{2})
- Time zone: UTC-5 (Eastern (EST))
  - Summer (DST): UTC-4 (EDT)
- FIPS code: 26-57860
- GNIS feature ID: 1626808

Noble Township is a civil township of Branch County in the U.S. state of Michigan. The population was 458 at the 2020 census.

There are no incorporated municipalities in the primarily agricultural township. There are no named settlements or unincorporated communities.

== Geography ==
There are a series of small lakes in the east side of the township that drain into the Fawn River, which crosses the southeast corner. The Prairie River drains a portion on the north side.

According to the United States Census Bureau, the township has a total area of 21.4 square miles (55.3 km^{2}), of which 20.2 square miles (52.3 km^{2}) is land and 0.39 square miles (1.0 km^{2}), or 1.74%, is water.

== Demographics ==
Historical population
Census	Pop.	Note	%±
2000	518		—
2010	520		0.4%
2020	458		−11.9%

As of the census of 2000, there were 518 people, 170 households, and 146 families residing in the township. The population density was 24.7 per square mile (9.5/km^{2}). There were 185 housing units at an average density of 8.8 per square mile (3.4/km^{2}). The racial makeup of the township was 96.72% White, 0.58% Native American, 0.19% Asian, 1.54% from other races, and 0.97% from two or more races. Hispanic or Latino of any race were 2.12% of the population.

There were 170 households, out of which 38.2% had children under the age of 18 living with them, 70.6% were married couples living together, 7.6% had a female householder with no husband present, and 14.1% were non-families. 11.8% of all households were made up of individuals, and 5.9% had someone living alone who was 65 years of age or older. The average household size was 3.05 and the average family size was 3.30.

In the township the population was spread out, with 29.5% under the age of 18, 8.9% from 18 to 24, 28.0% from 25 to 44, 22.0% from 45 to 64, and 11.6% who were 65 years of age or older. The median age was 34 years. For every 100 females, there were 101.6 males. For every 100 females age 18 and over, there were 103.9 males.

The median income for a household in the township was $40,625, and the median income for a family was $42,917. Males had a median income of $31,094 versus $20,179 for females. The per capita income for the township was $14,885. About 11.3% of families and 15.8% of the population were below the poverty line, including 26.4% of those under age 18 and none of those age 65 or over.
