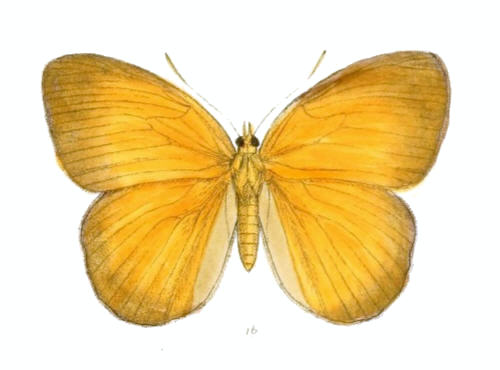

Scientific classification
- Domain: Eukaryota
- Kingdom: Animalia
- Phylum: Arthropoda
- Class: Insecta
- Order: Lepidoptera
- Family: Nymphalidae
- Genus: Faunis
- Species: F. arcesilaus

Binomial name
- Faunis arcesilaus (Fabricius, 1787)

= Faunis arcesilaus =

Species of butterfly

Faunis arcesilaus, the Indian faun, is a butterfly found in South Asia that belongs to the Morphinae subfamily of the brush-footed butterfly family.

This butterfly may be conspecific with Faunis canens.

== Distribution ==
The Indian faun ranges from Sikkim to Assam and Myanmar.

== Description ==
The upperside of both the male and female is ochraceous, uniform in male. Apex of forewing and termen in forewings and hindwings in female slightly darker. Underside slightly ochraceous brown; subbasal and discal narrow dark fasciae crossing both forewing and hindwing, strongly curved on the latter; followed by a postdiscal line of minute yellow spots, six. on the forewing, seven on the hindwing, on the latter posteriorly abruptly curved; lastly, a sub terminal dark sinuous line. Antennae, head, thorax and abdomen concolorous with the upperside of the wings.

== Status ==
In 1957, Mark Alexander Wynter-Blyth described the species as being common.

== See also ==
- List of butterflies of India
- List of butterflies of India (Morphinae)
- List of butterflies of India (Nymphalidae)
