= Fon =

Fon or FON may refer to:

== Terms ==
- Fon (title), a traditional title for a ruler in Cameroon
- Fiber-optic network
- Freedom of navigation
- The chemistry mnemonic "FON", used for determining which elements hydrogen forms hydrogen bonds with.
- Fon language, spoken by the Fon people
- Funding Opportunity Number, assigned by United States federal agencies to available grants

== Organizations ==
- Fon (company), a Wi-Fi provider
- Federation of Ontario Naturalists, now Ontario Nature, a Canadian environmental organization
- FON University, university in Macedonia
- University of Belgrade Faculty of Organizational Sciences, faculty in Serbia
- Fundusz Obrony Narodowej, or Fund for National Defense, a collection attempt in Poland prior to World War II
- Sprint Corporation

== People ==
- Fon people, a major West African ethnic and linguistic group
- Bryn Fôn (born 1954), Welsh actor and musician

== Places ==
- Fonfjord, a fjord in eastern Greenland
- Fon, Norway, a village in Tønsberg Municipality in Vestfold, Norway

== Other ==
- Fish On Next, a video game

== See also ==
- Fun (disambiguation)
- Fawn (disambiguation)
- Faun (disambiguation)
- Phon (disambiguation)
