= Phon (disambiguation) =

A phon is a unit of loudness.

Phon may also refer to:

- Phon district, Khon Kaen Province, Thailand
- Pauline Hanson's One Nation, an Australian political party

== People with the given name ==
- Phon Sangsingkeo (1907–1980), Thai doctor
- Chheng Phon (1930–2016), Cambodian artist
- Pauline Dy Phon (1933–2010), Cambodian botanist
- Phon Martdee (born 1958), Thai-born Australian Muay Thai instructor

== See also ==
- Fon (disambiguation)
- Phone (disambiguation)
- Phons O'Mara (1887–1958), Irish politician and businessman
