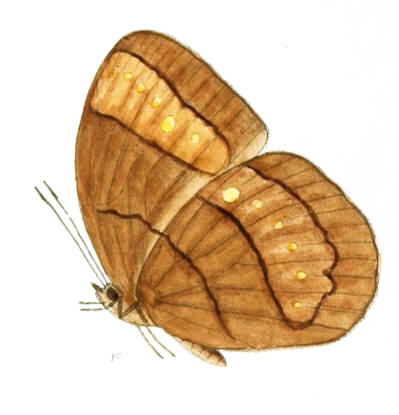

Scientific classification
- Domain: Eukaryota
- Kingdom: Animalia
- Phylum: Arthropoda
- Class: Insecta
- Order: Lepidoptera
- Family: Nymphalidae
- Genus: Faunis
- Species: F. assama

Binomial name
- Faunis assama (Westwood, 1858)

= Faunis assama =

Species of butterfly

Faunis assama, the Assam faun, is a butterfly found in South Asia that belongs to the Morphinae subfamily of the brush-footed butterfly family.

This butterfly was earlier considered to be a subspecies of the large faun (Faunis eumeus (Drury, 1773)).

== Distribution ==
The Assam faun ranges from the Khasi and Jaintia Hills of Meghalaya to northern Myanmar.

== Description ==
The species closely resembles Faunis eumeus but is larger; the ground colour on the upperside in the male uniform ochraceous, without a preapical oblique band on the forewing; the female is more ochraceous brown than maroon, with a preapical bright ochraceous oblique band on the forewing, broader and more diffuse than in F. eumeus. Underside similar to the underside in F. eumeus, with the sinuous transverse dark lines and spots much as in that form, but the ground colour is slightly darker and more uniform.

== Status ==
The species is considered rare.
