= Florence Township, Michigan =

- Township
- Location within the state of Michigan Florence Township, Michigan (the United States)
- Coordinates: 41°51′51″N 85°35′58″W
- Country: United States
- State: Michigan
- County: St. Joseph

Area
  - Total: 33.7 sq mi (87.4 km^{2})
  - Land: 33.6 sq mi (86.9 km^{2})
  - Water: 0.19 sq mi (0.5 km^{2})
- Elevation: 814 ft (248 m)

Population (2020)
  - Total: 1,153
  - Density: 34.4/sq mi (13.3/km^{2})
- Time zone: UTC-5 (Eastern (EST))
  - Summer (DST): UTC-4 (EDT)
- FIPS code: 26-29060
- GNIS feature ID: 1626287
- Website: http://www.florencetownship.org/

Florence Township is a civil township of St. Joseph County in the U.S. state of Michigan. The population was 1,153 at the 2020 census. It was organized in 1837.

== Geography ==
According to the United States Census Bureau, the township has a total area of 33.8 square miles (88 km^{2}), of which 33.6 square miles (87 km^{2}) is land and 0.2 square miles (0.52 km^{2}) (0.56%) is water.

== Demographics ==
As of the census of 2000, there were 1,436 people, 502 households, and 383 families residing in the township. The population density was 42.8 inhabitants per square mile (16.5/km^{2}). There were 530 housing units at an average density of 15.8 per square mile (6.1/km^{2}). The racial makeup of the township was 96.17% White, 0.91% African American, 0.35% Native American, 0.14% Asian, 0.56% from other races, and 1.88% from two or more races. Hispanic or Latino of any race were 3.76% of the population.

There were 502 households, out of which 37.1% had children under the age of 18 living with them, 64.5% were married couples living together, 7.6% had a female householder with no husband present, and 23.7% were non-families. 17.1% of all households were made up of individuals, and 7.4% had someone living alone who was 65 years of age or older. The average household size was 2.83 and the average family size was 3.17.

In the township the population was spread out, with 29.0% under the age of 18, 7.3% from 18 to 24, 30.3% from 25 to 44, 24.7% from 45 to 64, and 8.8% who were 65 years of age or older. The median age was 36 years. For every 100 females, there were 107.5 males. For every 100 females age 18 and over, there were 102.4 males.

The median income for a household in the township was $45,288, and the median income for a family was $47,500. Males had a median income of $33,125 versus $22,419 for females. The per capita income for the township was $19,086. About 5.4% of families and 9.6% of the population were below the poverty line, including 10.0% of those under age 18 and 12.3% of those age 65 or over.
