= Kinderhook Township, Michigan =

- Civil township
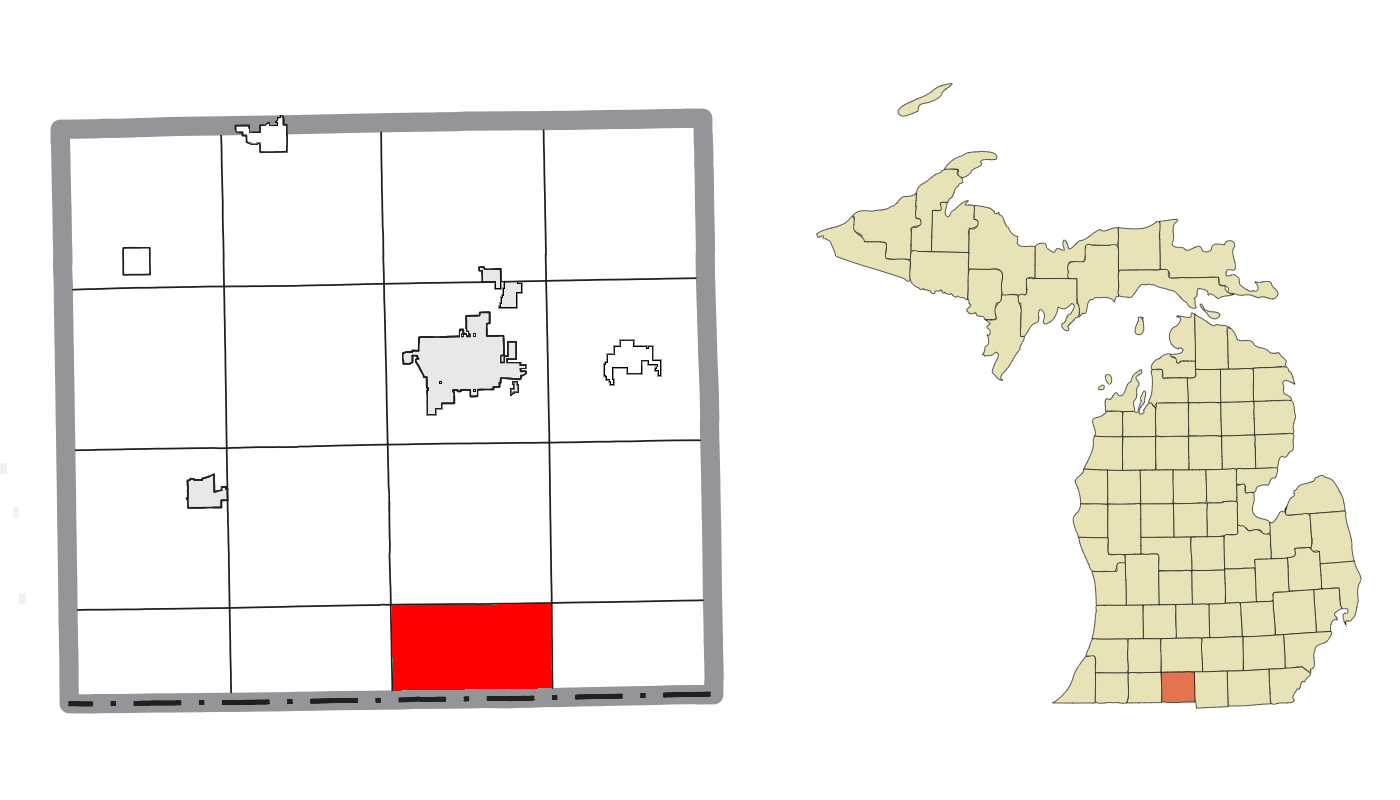
- Location within Branch County

- Location within the state of Michigan Location within the United States
- Coordinates: 41°47′10″N 85°00′21″W
- Country: United States
- State: Michigan
- County: Branch

Area
  - Total: 21.4 sq mi (55.3 km^{2})
  - Land: 19.5 sq mi (50.4 km^{2})
  - Water: 1.9 sq mi (4.9 km^{2})
- Elevation: 1,010 ft (308 m)

Population (2020)
  - Total: 1,427
  - Density: 73.3/sq mi (28.3/km^{2})
- Time zone: UTC-5 (Eastern (EST))
  - Summer (DST): UTC-4 (EDT)
- FIPS code: 26-43260
- GNIS feature ID: 1626560
- Website: Official website

Kinderhook Township is a civil township of Branch County in the U.S. state of Michigan. As of the 2020 census, the township population was 1,427.

== Communities ==
There are no incorporated municipalities within the primarily agricultural township. There are settlements in three communities:

- Canada Shores is on the southeast side of Coldwater Lake at 41°48′28″N 84°57′45″W.
- Kinderhook is just west of exit 3 on I-69 at 41°47′48″N 85°00′19″W.
- West Kinderhook is at 41°46′55″N 85°03′15″W.

== Geography ==
There are several lakes in the township. Those in the west drain into the Prairie River, while those in the south drain into the Fawn River. Coldwater Lake, located in the northeast of the township, drains into the Coldwater River.

According to the United States Census Bureau, the township has a total area of 21.4 square miles (55.3 km^{2}), of which 19.5 square miles (50.4 km^{2}) is land and 1.9 square miles (4.9 km^{2}), or 8.82%, is water.

== Demographics ==
Historical population
Census	Pop.	Note	%±
2000	1,614		—
2010	1,497		−7.2%
2020	1,427		−4.7%

As of the census of 2000, there were 1,614 people, 643 households, and 500 families residing in the township. The population density was 82.9 inhabitants per square mile (32.0/km^{2}). There were 1,184 housing units at an average density of 60.8 per square mile (23.5/km^{2}). The racial makeup of the township was 96.72% White, 0.31% African American, 0.62% Native American, 0.06% Asian, 0.06% Pacific Islander, 1.18% from other races, and 1.05% from two or more races. Hispanic or Latino of any race were 1.49% of the population.

There were 643 households, out of which 30.5% had children under the age of 18 living with them, 68.7% were married couples living together, 5.1% had a female householder with no husband present, and 22.2% were non-families. 18.0% of all households were made up of individuals, and 7.6% had someone living alone who was 65 years of age or older. The average household size was 2.51 and the average family size was 2.83.

In the township the population was spread out, with 23.2% under the age of 18, 6.2% from 18 to 24, 27.0% from 25 to 44, 27.8% from 45 to 64, and 15.7% who were 65 years of age or older. The median age was 42 years. For every 100 females, there were 103.3 males. For every 100 females age 18 and over, there were 103.1 males.

The median income for a household in the township was $45,903, and the median income for a family was $50,474. Males had a median income of $33,922 versus $24,583 for females. The per capita income for the township was $21,801. About 3.9% of families and 5.1% of the population were below the poverty line, including 6.6% of those under age 18 and 3.8% of those age 65 or over.
