= Fun Radio =

Fun Radio may refer to:

- Fun Radio (France), a major radio station in France
- Fun Radio (Belgium), a radio station in Belgium
- Fun Rádio, a Slovak commercial radio station
- Fun Kids, British children's digital radio station earlier known as Fun Radio
