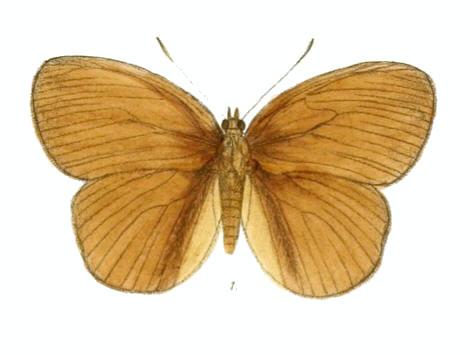
- Faunis arcesilaus

Scientific classification
- Domain: Eukaryota
- Kingdom: Animalia
- Phylum: Arthropoda
- Class: Insecta
- Order: Lepidoptera
- Family: Nymphalidae
- Subfamily: Morphinae
- Tribe: Amathusiini
- Genus: Faunis; Hübner, [1819]

Type species
- Papilio eumeus Drury, [1773]

Species
- About 14 species, including: Faunis arcesilaus - Indian faun; Faunis assama - Asam faun; Faunis canens - common faun; Faunis eumeus - large faun; Faunis stomphax; See species list in text.

Synonyms
- Clerome Westwood, [1850]

= Faunis =

Genus of brush-footed butterflies

Faunis is a genus of Asian butterflies in the family Nymphalidae. They are among the butterflies commonly known as fauns. They are relatively small-sized amathusiins, subtly colored in soft browns and violets, and range from China to the Philippines and Sulawesi.

Larvae are found on Musa, Smilax, and Pandanus host plants.

Many forms, whether species or subspecies, are restricted to islands and are probably vulnerable.

== Species list ==
Based on Markku Savela's Lepidoptera and Some Other Life Forms. Years given are the actual publication dates where known.

- Faunis Hübner, 1819 (= Clerome Westwood, 1850)
  - Faunis aerope (Leech, 1890)
    - Faunis aerope aerope (Leech, 1890)
    - Faunis aerope excelsa Fruhstorfer, 1911
    - Faunis aerope masseyeffi Brooks, 1949
    - Faunis aerope longpoensis Huang, 2001
  - Faunis arcesilaus (Fabricius, 1787) originally Papilio arcesilaus Fabricius, 1787
  - Faunis assama (Westwood, 1858)
  - Faunis canens Hübner, 1826
    - Faunis canens canens Hübner, 1826
    - Faunis canens arcesilas Stichel, 1933
    - Faunis canens borneensis Fruhstorfer
    - Faunis canens pallidior Hagan
    - Faunis canens samadhi Fruhstorfer
    - Faunis canens niasana Fruhstorfer
  - Faunis eumeus (Drury, 1773) originally Papilio eumeus Drury, 1773
    - Faunis eumeus eumeus (Drury, 1773)
    - Faunis eumeus incerta Staudinger
  - Faunis gracilis (Butler, 1867) originally Clerome gracilis Butler, 1867
  - Faunis kirata (de Nicéville, 1891) originally Clerome kirata de Nicéville, 1891
  - Faunis menado (Hewitson, 1863)
    - Faunis menado menado (Hewitson, 1863)
    - Faunis menado pleonasma Röber
    - Faunis menado chitone Hewitson
    - Faunis menado intermedia Röber
    - Faunis menado syllus Fruhstorfer
    - Faunis menado suluana Fruhstorfer
  - Faunis phaon Erichson, 1834
    - Faunis phaon leucis (Felder & Felder, 1861)
    - Faunis phaon phaon Erichson, 1834
    - Faunis phaon lurida Felder
    - Faunis phaon ikonion Fruhstorfer
    - Faunis phaon sibuyanensis Yamaguchi & Aoki
  - Faunis sappho Semper, 1878
    - Faunis sappho sappho Semper, 1878
    - Faunis sappho kleis Semper
    - Faunis sappho ameinokleia Fruhstorfer
  - Faunis stomphax (Westwood, 1858)
    - Faunis stomphax stomphax (Westwood, 1858)
    - Faunis stomphax plateni Staudinger

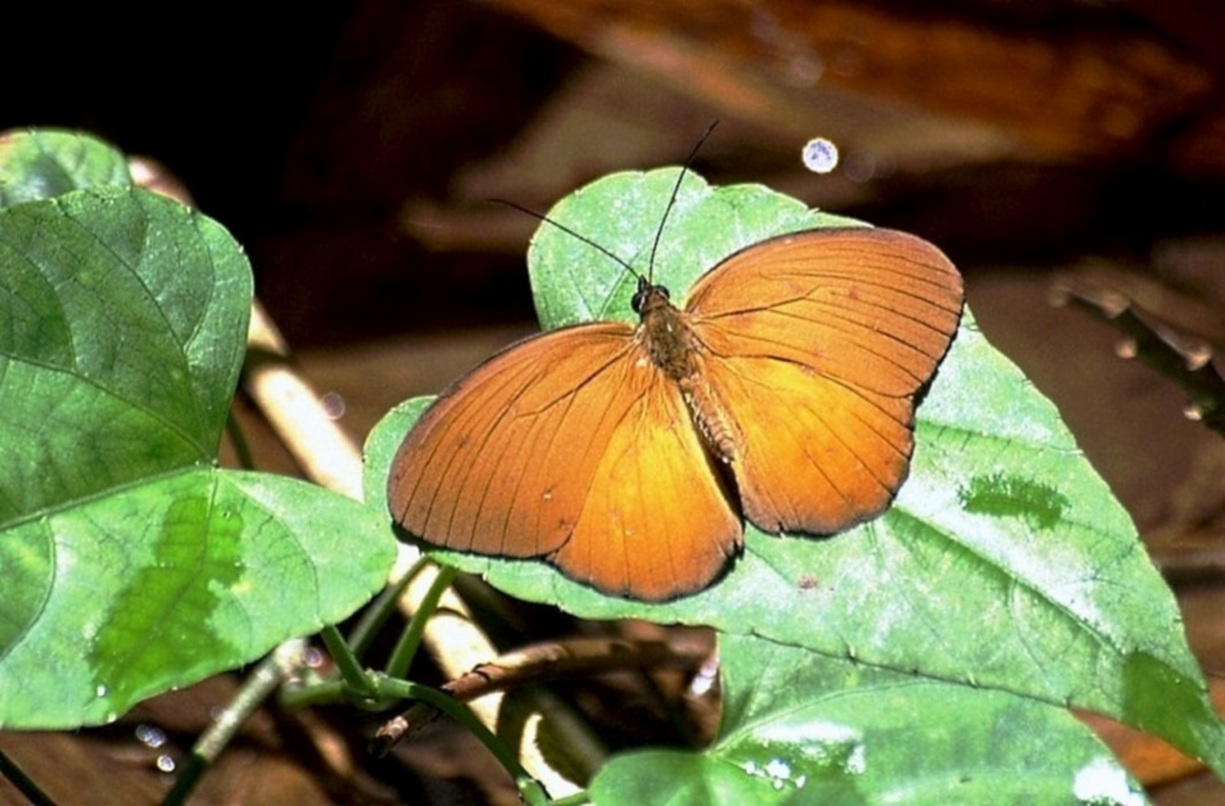
Faunis canens
