= Fawn Island =

Island in Canada

- Location within Ontario

Geography
- Location: St. Clair River
- Coordinates: 42.6996°N 82.4907°W

Administration
- Canada
- Province: Ontario
- County: Lambton

Additional information
- Official website: http://www.fawnisland.com/

Fawn Island is a small Canadian island located in the St. Clair River between Sombra, Ontario and Marine City, Michigan. The island is approximately 50 miles (80 km) northeast of Detroit, Michigan and Windsor, Ontario. There are over 50 cottages on the island, all accessible via the island's two canals. The canals divide the island into three islets, joined by two small bridges.

== History ==
Queen Victoria granted the island to Captain Whitley, who built a summer hotel on the north end of the island. The island was frequented by tourists who would enjoy the hotel, dancing, and picnics, but it was eventually abandoned. When the island came to be known as Fawn Island is unknown. In 1955, J.L Thompson, the mayor of Wallaceburg, Ontario, began developing the item as a summer resort community, eventually owning most of the island. The existing streets were changed into the canals of today.
