= USS Fawn =

Gunboat of the United States Navy (1863–1865)

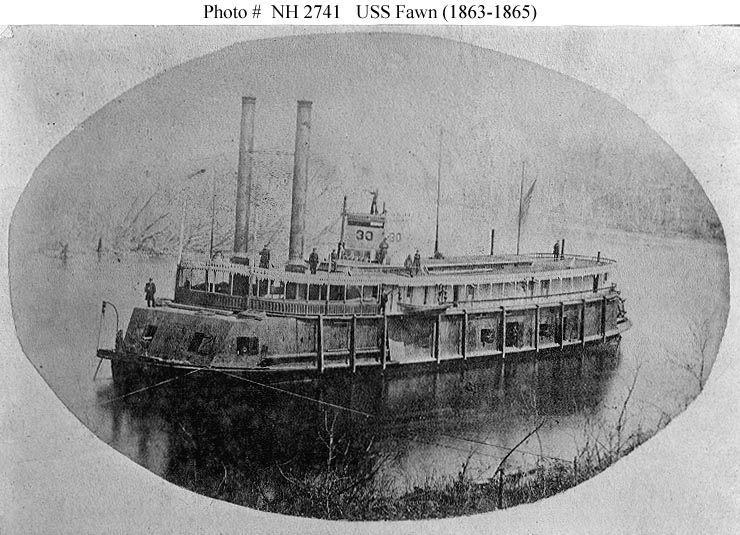
- USS Fawn (1863–1865), tied up to the river bank, on one of the Western Rivers during the Civil War

History

United States
- Name: USS Fawn
- Ordered: as Fanny Barker
- Laid down: date unknown
- Launched: 1863
- Acquired: 13 May 1863
- Commissioned: 11 May 1863
- Decommissioned: 30 June 1865
- Fate: Sold, 17 August 1865

General characteristics
- Displacement: 174 tons
- Length: 158 ft 8 in (48.36 m)
- Beam: 30 ft 5 in (9.27 m)
- Draught: 3 ft 6 in (1.07 m)
- Propulsion: steam engine; stern wheel-propelled
- Speed: 4 mph
- Complement: not known
- Armament: six 24-pounder howitzers

The USS Fawn was a steamer purchased by the Union Navy during the American Civil War. She was used by the Union Navy as a patrol and escort vessel, operating in Confederate waterways.

Fawn, a stern wheel steamer, was launched in 1863 at Cincinnati, Ohio, as Fanny Barker. She was commissioned 11 May 1863 and purchased by the Navy 13 May 1863, Acting Master J. R. Grace in command. She was renamed Fawn 19 June 1863.

== Supporting operations ==
Throughout the remainder of the Civil War, Fawn patrolled the Mississippi, Tennessee, White and Arkansas Rivers, also convoying Union Army transports, ferrying troops across rivers, carrying Army payrolls, and often engaging Confederate batteries, cavalry, and foot soldiers ashore.

For much of her career, she served in the White River, convoying transports and shelling Confederate positions that threatened Union troop concentrations.

== Holed by a hit at Clarendon, Arkansas ==
From March through June 1864, aside from a brief repair period at Memphis, Tennessee, she supported Army operations against Clarendon, Arkansas, receiving one hit from a shore battery there.

== Final operations and decommissioning ==
From March to May 1865, Fawn patrolled the Mississippi between the White and St. Francis Rivers, then sailed up river to Mound City, Illinois, where she was decommissioned 30 June 1865 and sold 17 August 1865.
