= Fawn (given name) =

Feminine given name

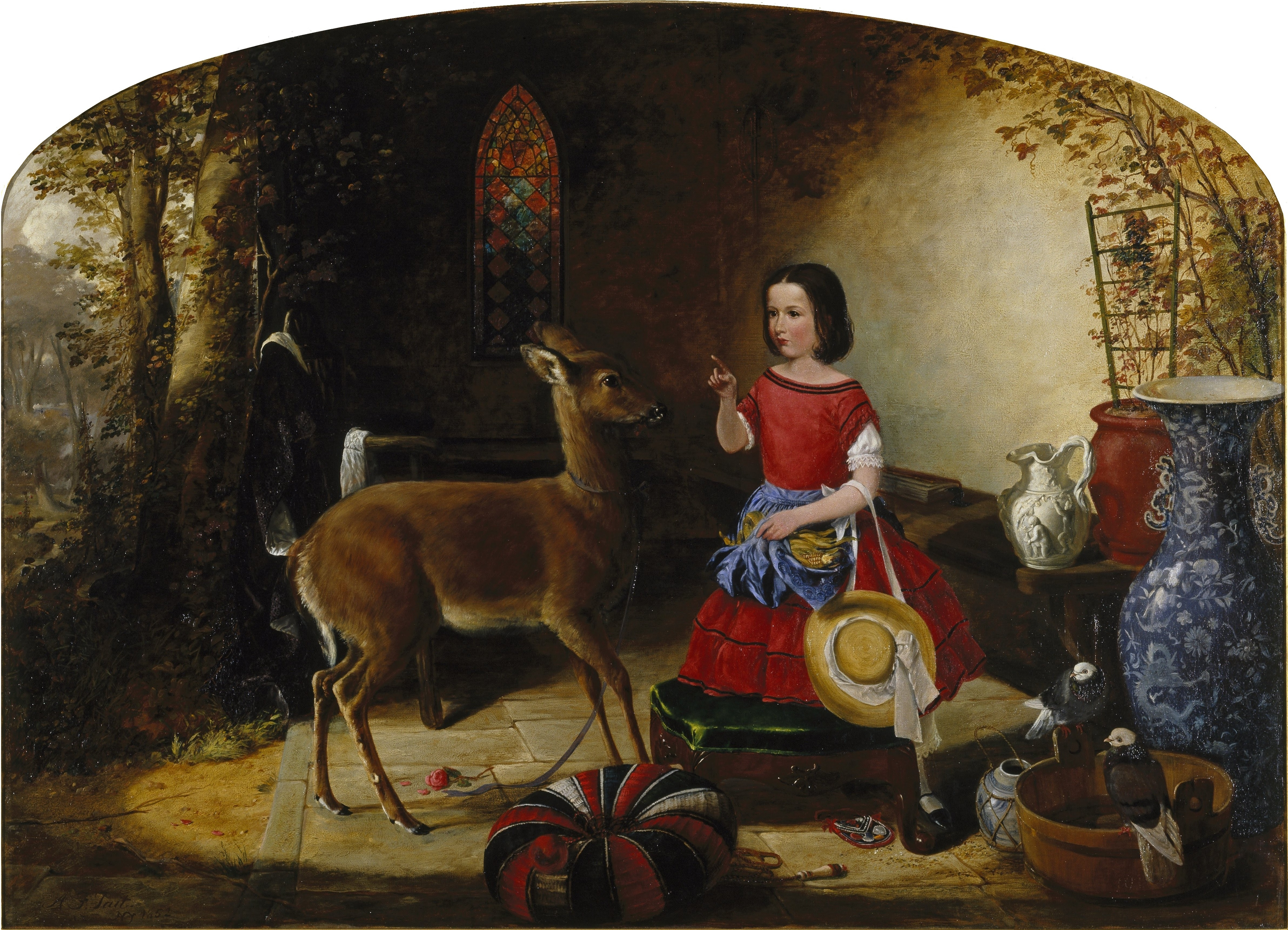
- The Reprimand. Ah! You Naughty Fawn, You Have Been Eating the Flowers Again by Arthur Fitzwilliam Tait, 1852.
- Gender: Feminine
- Language: English

Origin
- Meaning: "Fawn" or "Fawn-colored”
- Region of origin: Anglosphere

Other names
- Related names: Fawna, Fawne, Fawnia

Fawn is a feminine given name derived from the English name for a juvenile deer and the color. "Fawn" is also an English word meaning "to court favor from" or "to show affection." Fawne is a spelling variant. Fawna and Fawnia are other variants of the name. The name has been in use in the Anglosphere since the 18th century. It was among the top 1,000 names for newborn girls in the United States between 1960 and 1966 and again between 1973 and 1983. It has since declined in use.

== Women named Fawn ==
- Fawn M. Brodie (1915–1981), American biographer and college history professor
- Fawn Girard (born 1978), American archer
- Fawn Hall (born 1959), American civil servant
- Fawn Johnson, American journalist
- Fawn Krieger (born 1975), American interdisciplinary artist
- Fawn Parker, Canadian writer
- Fawn Sharp (born 1970), American Quinault politician, attorney, and policy advocate
- Fawn Silver, American actress
- Fawn Veerasunthorn, Thai film director and animator
- Fawn Weaver (born 1976), American entrepreneur and author
- Fawn Wood, Canadian Cree and Salish musician
- Fawn Yacker, American filmmaker, producer, and cinematographer
