= Future University Hakodate =

Public university in Hakodate, Hokkaidō, Japan

Coordinates: 41°50′30.5″N 140°46′1.2″E

- 公立はこだて未来大学
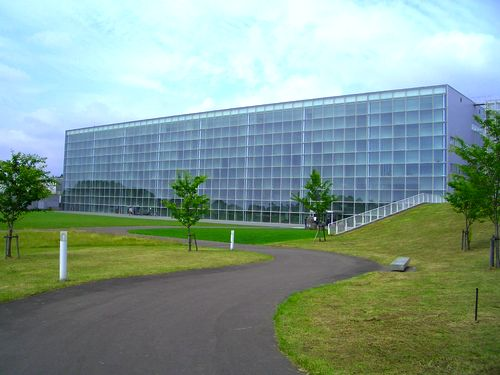
- Type: Public
- Established: 2000
- President: Yasuhiro Katagiri
- Students: 1,243
- Undergraduates: 1,155
- Postgraduates: 88
- Location: Hakodate, Hokkaidō, Japan
- Website: Official site

Future University Hakodate (公立はこだて未来大学, Kōritsu Hakodate Mirai Daigaku) is a public university in the city of Hakodate, Hokkaidō, Japan, established in 2000. The university's School of Systems Information Science is separated into two departments: the Department of Media Architecture and the Department of Complex and Intelligent Systems.
