= Fawn River Township, Michigan =

- Township
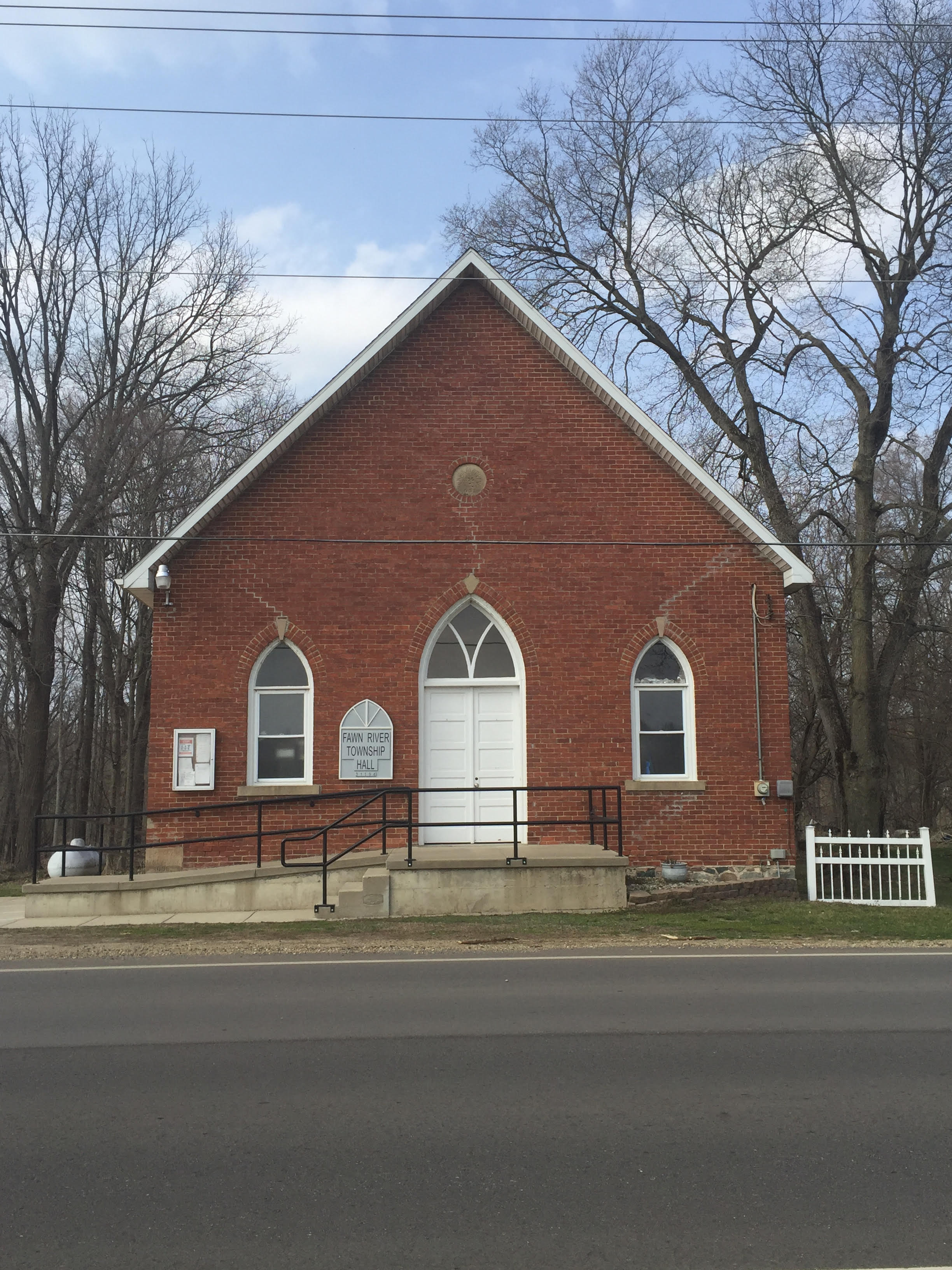
- Town hall

- Location within the state of Michigan Fawn River Township, Michigan (the United States)
- Coordinates: 41°47′4″N 85°21′50″W
- Country: United States
- State: Michigan
- County: St. Joseph

Area
  - Total: 19.9 sq mi (51.5 km^{2})
  - Land: 19.5 sq mi (50.5 km^{2})
  - Water: 0.35 sq mi (0.9 km^{2})
- Elevation: 879 ft (268 m)

Population (2020)
  - Total: 1,587
  - Density: 81.4/sq mi (31.4/km^{2})
- Time zone: UTC-5 (Eastern (EST))
  - Summer (DST): UTC-4 (EDT)
- FIPS code: 26-27540
- GNIS feature ID: 1626271
- Website: https://www.fawnrivertownship.org/

Fawn River Township is a civil township of St. Joseph County in the U.S. state of Michigan. The population was 1,587 at the 2020 census. The township is named for the Fawn River.

== Geography ==
According to the United States Census Bureau, the township has a total area of 19.9 square miles (52 km^{2}), of which 19.5 square miles (51 km^{2}) is land and 0.4 square miles (1.0 km^{2}) (1.86%) is water.

== Demographics ==
As of the census of 2000, there were 1,648 people, 597 households, and 450 families residing in the township. The population density was 84.5 inhabitants per square mile (32.6/km^{2}). There were 651 housing units at an average density of 33.4 per square mile (12.9/km^{2}). The racial makeup of the township was 97.33% White, 0.61% African American, 0.06% Native American, 0.42% Asian, 1.15% from other races, and 0.42% from two or more races. Hispanic or Latino of any race were 2.73% of the population.

There were 597 households, out of which 36.7% had children under the age of 18 living with them, 62.5% were married couples living together, 8.5% had a female householder with no husband present, and 24.5% were non-families. 19.8% of all households were made up of individuals, and 7.2% had someone living alone who was 65 years of age or older. The average household size was 2.76 and the average family size was 3.15.

In the township the population was spread out, with 27.7% under the age of 18, 7.4% from 18 to 24, 30.7% from 25 to 44, 24.9% from 45 to 64, and 9.3% who were 65 years of age or older. The median age was 35 years. For every 100 females, there were 100.7 males. For every 100 females age 18 and over, there were 104.5 males.

The median income for a household in the township was $41,852, and the median income for a family was $46,985. Males had a median income of $30,865 versus $22,841 for females. The per capita income for the township was $17,533. About 4.6% of families and 7.3% of the population were below the poverty line, including 9.2% of those under age 18 and 5.3% of those age 65 or over.
