= Fawn River (Michigan) =

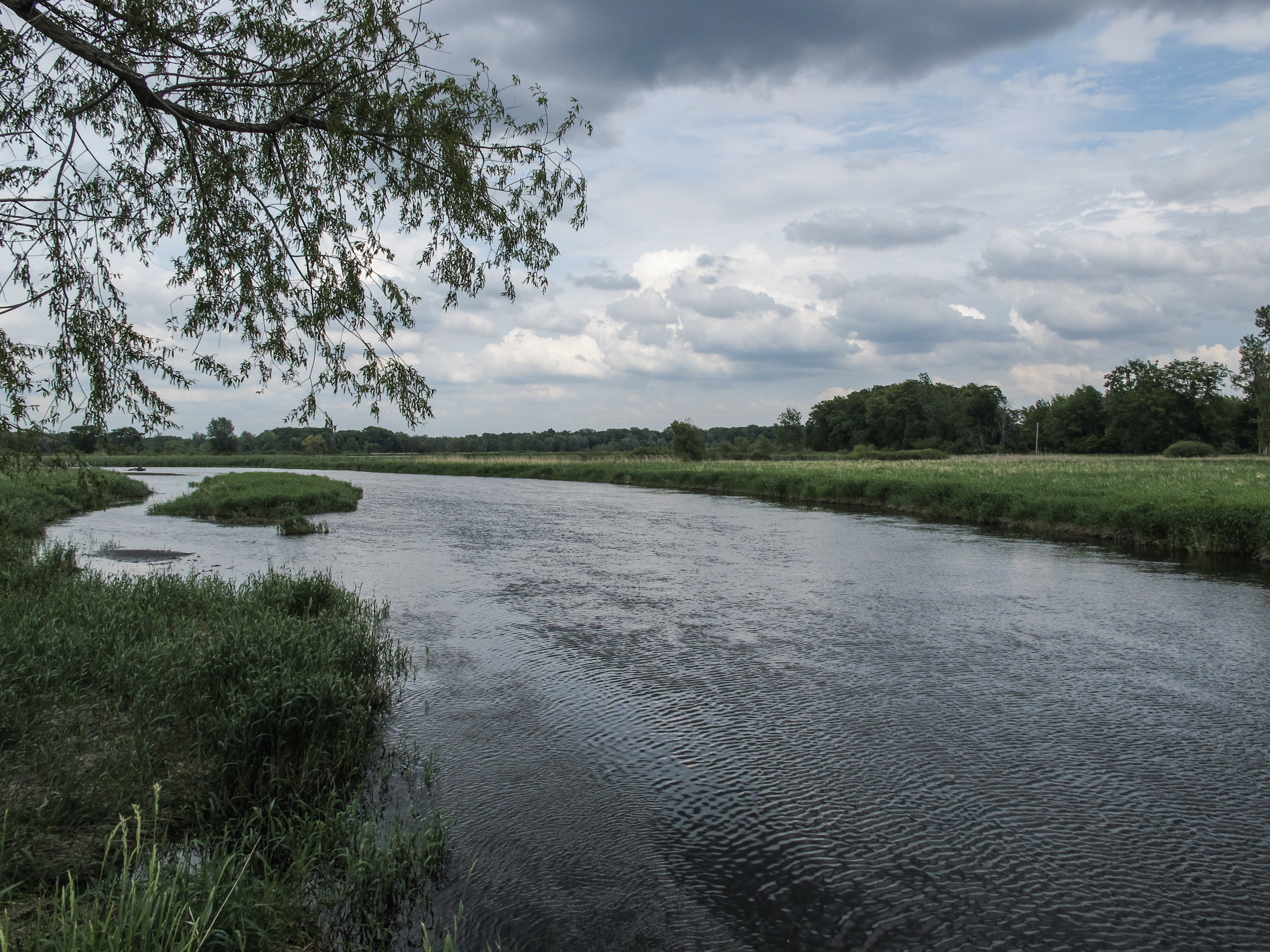
- The Fawn River in Florence Township, Michigan

Location
- Country: United States

Physical characteristics
- Source
  - location: Steuben County north of Orland, Indiana
  - coordinates: 41°44′19″N 85°10′01″W
  - elevation: 939 ft (286 m)
- Mouth
  - location: Confluence with the St. Joseph River at Constantine, Michigan
  - coordinates: 41°50′45″N 85°40′02″W
  - elevation: 774 ft (236 m)
- Length: 55 mi (89 km)

Basin features
- Progression: Fawn River → St. Joseph River → Lake Michigan → Great Lakes → St. Lawrence River → Gulf of St. Lawrence
- GNIS ID: 452598

The Fawn River is a 55.4-mile-long (89.2 km) river in southwest Michigan and northeast Indiana in the United States. It flows into the St. Joseph River in the city of Constantine, Michigan. The headwaters rise in a series of lakes and marshes in northern Steuben County, Indiana near Pokagon State Park, where it is known as "Crooked Creek" and "Little Fawn River". It flows west-northwest across the northeast corner of LaGrange County, Indiana and then over the state line across the southeast corner of Branch County, Michigan before entering St. Joseph County, Michigan. Passing to the south of Sturgis, Michigan, the river meanders across the state line a few more times before flowing north into Constantine. Except for Constantine, the river does not flow through any large communities, although it passes near Fremont, Indiana, Orland, Indiana, Sturgis, Howe, Indiana, and White Pigeon, Michigan.

Fawn River Township, Michigan is named after the river.

== Drainage basin ==
The drainage basin for the Fawn River and tributaries includes all or portions of the following:

- Steuben County, Indiana
  - Fremont Township
  - Jamestown Township
  - Millgrove Township
- LaGrange County, Indiana
  - Greenfield Township
  - Lima Township
  - Van Buren Township
- Branch County, Michigan
  - California Township
  - Gilead Township (portion of southwest corner drains into Anderson Lake
  - Kinderhook Township
  - Noble Township
- St. Joseph County, Michigan
  - Constantine Township
  - Fawn River Township
  - Florence Township
  - Sherman Township
  - Sturgis Township
  - White Pigeon Township

== Tributaries ==
(from the mouth)

- (left) Fawn River Drain
- (left) Klinger Lake
  - Tamarack Lake
    - Thompson Lake
- (left) Pickerel Lake
  - Aldrich Lake
- (right) Wenger Ditch
- (left) Nye Drain
- (right) outflow from Cedar Lake
  - Meteer Lake
  - Duff Lake
- (left) outflow from Lee Lake
  - Williams Lake
    - Baker Lake
    - Dark Lake (Nigar Lake/Lake Johnson)
      - Cade Lake
        - Sweet Lake
- (left) Himebaugh Drain
- (left) outflow from Long Noble Lake
  - Royer Lake
    - Mallow Lake
      - Fish Lake
        - Honey Lake
- (left) outflow from Lime Lake
  - Anderson Lake

Becomes the Crooked Creek

- (right) outflow from Tamarack Lake
  - Warner Lake
  - Chair Factory Lake
    - Rhodes Lake
    - Lime Lake
      - Lake Gage
        - Crooked Lake
          - Loon Lake
          - Center Lake
- (right) outflow from Bell Lake
- Jimmerson Lake
- Lake James
- Snow Lake
  - Follette Creek
    - Big Otter Lake
      - outflow from Walters Lake
      - Little Otter Lake
        - outflow from Green Lake
        - Marsh Lake
          - Seven Sisters Lakes
          - Lake Minfenokee
  - Lake George
    - Silver Lake
      - Huyck Lake
        - Little Fawn River
          - Fish Lake

== See also ==
- List of rivers of Indiana
