= Burr Oak =

Burr Oak may refer to:

- Bur oak or Burr oak (Quercus macrocarpa), a species of North American oak tree
- Burr Oak, Marshall County, Indiana
- Burr Oak, Noble County, Indiana
- Burr Oak, Iowa
- Burr Oak, Kansas
- Burr Oak, Michigan
- Burr Oak Township, Michigan
- Burr Oak, Missouri
- Burr Oak, Ohio
- Burr Oak, Wisconsin
- Burr Oak Cemetery, a cemetery in Alsip, Illinois
- Burr Oak Creek (disambiguation)
- Burr Oak State Park, a park in Ohio
