= Sturgis Public Schools =

School district in Michigan

Address
- 107 W. West St. Sturgis, St. Joseph County, Michigan, 49091; United States

District information
- Grades: Pre-Kindergarten-12
- Superintendent: Dr. Art Ebert
- Schools: 6
- Budget: $45,924,000 2022-2023 expenditures
- NCES District ID: 2633090

Students and staff
- Students: 2,773 (2024-2025)
- Teachers: 165.35 (on an FTE basis) (2024-2025)
- Staff: 356.03 FTE (2024-2025)
- Student–teacher ratio: 16.77 (2024-2025)

Other information
- Website: www.sturgisps.org

Sturgis Public Schools is a public school district in St. Joseph County, Michigan. It serves Sturgis, Fawn River Township, Sturgis Township, and parts of Burr Oak Township and Sherman Township.

== History ==
The first public school in Sturgis opened in 1830. Central Commons, once known as Central School, is located where Union School was built in 1862. In 1874, the first high school class graduated from Union School.

Central School was built in 1917, and Union School was demolished. Central School housed the high school until the current high school opened in the fall of 1962. Central School then became the district's middle school. The high school gym was dedicated on November 1, 1962 in a celebration that included Cab Calloway as master of ceremonies and the Harlem Globetrotters performing basketball tricks. The high school underwent a major expansion in 1969.

With the opening of the current middle school in 2005, Central School (then known as Sturgis Middle School) became Central Commons, a preschool and administration building.

== Schools ==
Schools in Sturgis Public Schools district
School	Address	Notes
Sturgis Central Commons	107 W. West St., Sturgis	Preschool and administration building. Built 1917. Formerly district's high school and middle school.
Congress School	421 E. Congress St., Sturgis	Grades K-2. Built 1925.
Wall School	702 E. Lafayette St., Sturgis	Grades K-2. Built 1955.
Wenzel School	403 S. Parks St., Sturgis	Grades K-2. Built 1928.
Eastwood School	909 S. Franks Ave., Sturgis	Grades 3-5. Built 1994.
Sturgis Middle School	1400 E. Lafayette St., Sturgis	Grades 6-8. Opened fall 2005.
Sturgis High School	216 Vinewood Ave., Sturgis	Grades 9-12. Built 1962.
