= Klingers, Michigan =

Unincorporated community in the state of Michigan, United States

- Unincorporated community
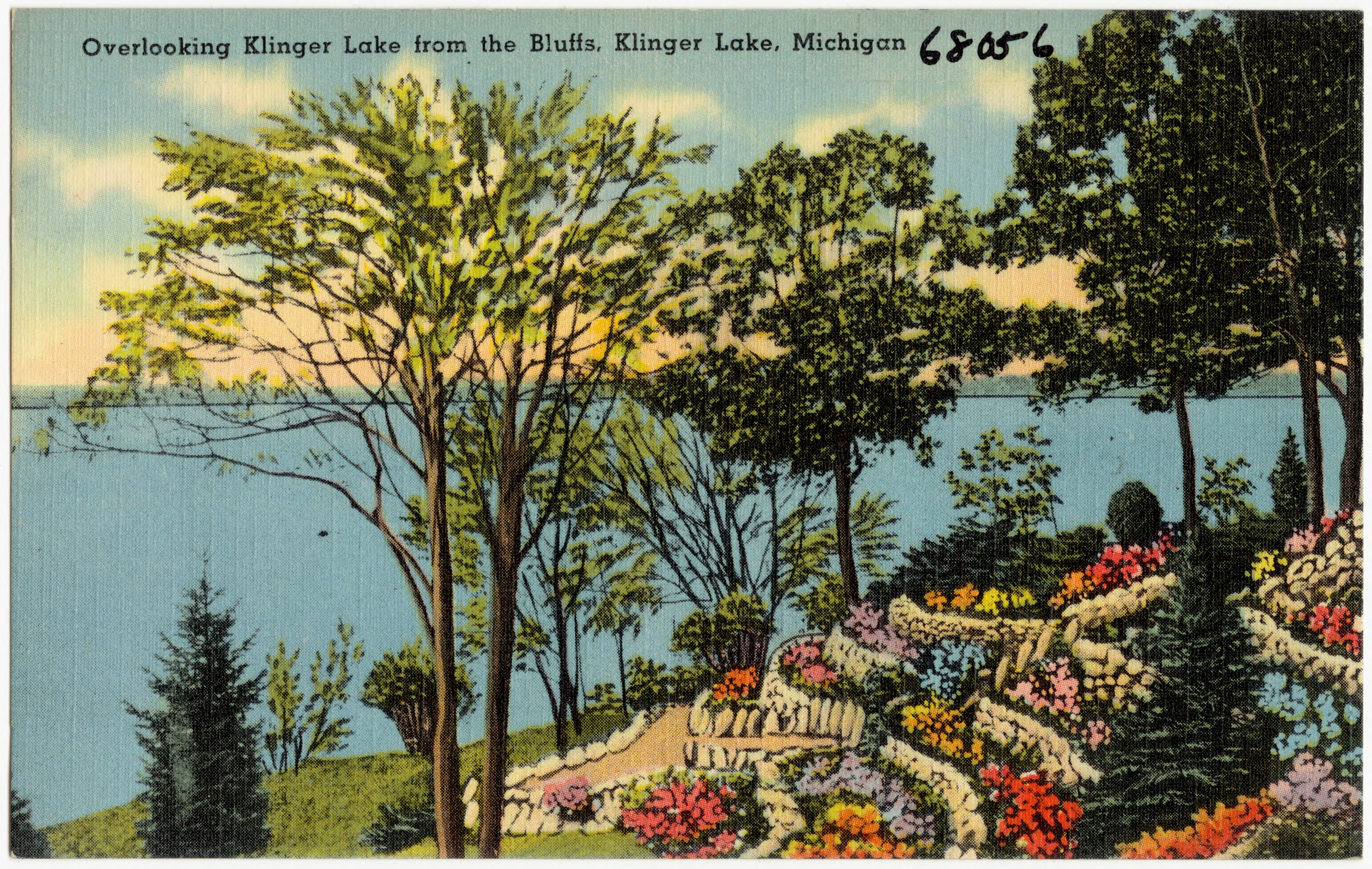
- Klinger Lake

- Location within the state of Michigan
- Coordinates: 41°47′35″N 85°31′34″W
- Country: United States
- State: Michigan
- County: St. Joseph
- Township: Sturgis, White Pigeon
- Elevation: 860 ft (260 m)
- Time zone: UTC-5 (Eastern (EST))
  - Summer (DST): UTC-4 (EDT)
- Area code: 269
- GNIS feature ID: 1624650

Klingers is an unincorporated community based around the nearby Klinger Lake located inside St. Joseph County in the southwest region of the U.S. state of Michigan.

== Geography ==
The community is situated at the junction of U.S. Highway 12 and County Road 133 (Klinger Lake Road) at 41°47′35″N 85°31′34″W. It is on the boundary approximately midway between Sturgis Township to the east and White Pigeon Township to the west.

Klinger Lake is nearby to the northwest within White Pigeon Township. The lake empties into the Fawn River via the Sherman Mill Creek, which also drains Tamarack Lake and Thompson Lake to the northeast.

== History ==
The community began with a station named "Douglas" on the Michigan Southern Railroad, later part of the Lake Shore and Michigan Southern Railway. When a post office with the name "Klinger's Lake" opened September 26, 1879, with Erastus P. Moon as the first postmaster, the station name was also changed. The name changed to "Klingers" on October 5, 1895, and was discontinued on May 31, 1937. The lake and community were named for Peter Klinger who had settled nearby in 1827. The name appears on various maps as Klinger, Klingers, or Klinger's Lake. Klinger Lake County Club is located nearby.
