= Parkville =

Parkville may refer to:

== Places ==
=== Australia ===
- Parkville, Victoria, an inner suburb of Melbourne, Victoria
- Parkville, New South Wales, a small town near Scone, New South Wales

=== United States ===
- Parkville, Hartford, Connecticut, a neighborhood
- Parkville, Maryland
- Parkville, Michigan
- Parkville, Missouri, a suburb of Kansas City
- Parkville, Pennsylvania

== Transportation ==
- Parkville railway station, in Melbourne, Victoria, Australia
- Parkville station (Connecticut), in Hartford, Connecticut, United States

== See also ==
- Parkeville, Indiana
- Parksville (disambiguation)
