= Mendon Township, Michigan =

- Township
- Location within the state of Michigan Mendon Township, Michigan (the United States)
- Coordinates: 42°0′58″N 85°28′26″W
- Country: United States
- State: Michigan
- County: St. Joseph

Area
  - Total: 36.2 sq mi (93.8 km^{2})
  - Land: 35.0 sq mi (90.6 km^{2})
  - Water: 1.2 sq mi (3.2 km^{2})
- Elevation: 883 ft (269 m)

Population (2020)
  - Total: 2,581
  - Density: 73.8/sq mi (28.5/km^{2})
- Time zone: UTC-5 (Eastern (EST))
  - Summer (DST): UTC-4 (EDT)
- FIPS code: 26-53000
- GNIS feature ID: 1626722
- Website: https://mendontwp.com/

Mendon Township is a civil township of St. Joseph County in the U.S. state of Michigan. The population was 2,581 at the 2020 census. The Village of Mendon is located within the township.

== Geography ==
According to the United States Census Bureau, the township has a total area of 36.2 square miles (94 km^{2}), of which 35.0 square miles (91 km^{2}) is land and 1.2 square miles (3.1 km^{2}) (3.42%) is water. Portage Lake is located within the township.

== Demographics ==
As of the census of 2000, there were 2,775 people, 1,062 households, and 786 families residing in the township. The population density was 79.3 inhabitants per square mile (30.6/km^{2}). There were 1,291 housing units at an average density of 36.9 per square mile (14.2/km^{2}). The racial makeup of the township was 96.50% White, 1.01% African American, 0.54% Native American, 0.11% Asian, 0.18% Pacific Islander, 0.47% from other races, and 1.19% from two or more races. Hispanic or Latino of any race were 1.69% of the population.

There were 1,062 households, out of which 32.5% had children under the age of 18 living with them, 61.9% were married couples living together, 8.2% had a female householder with no husband present, and 25.9% were non-families. 21.4% of all households were made up of individuals, and 9.3% had someone living alone who was 65 years of age or older. The average household size was 2.60 and the average family size was 3.01.

In the township the population was spread out, with 27.3% under the age of 18, 6.5% from 18 to 24, 28.1% from 25 to 44, 22.9% from 45 to 64, and 15.2% who were 65 years of age or older. The median age was 38 years. For every 100 females, there were 100.7 males. For every 100 females age 18 and over, there were 96.1 males.

The median income for a household in the township was $41,324, and the median income for a family was $45,577. Males had a median income of $36,743 versus $23,482 for females. The per capita income for the township was $17,600. About 5.1% of families and 8.2% of the population were below the poverty line, including 12.9% of those under age 18 and 6.8% of those age 65 or over.
