= Portage River (Kalamazoo–St. Joseph counties) =

River that crosses Kalamazoo–St. Joseph counties

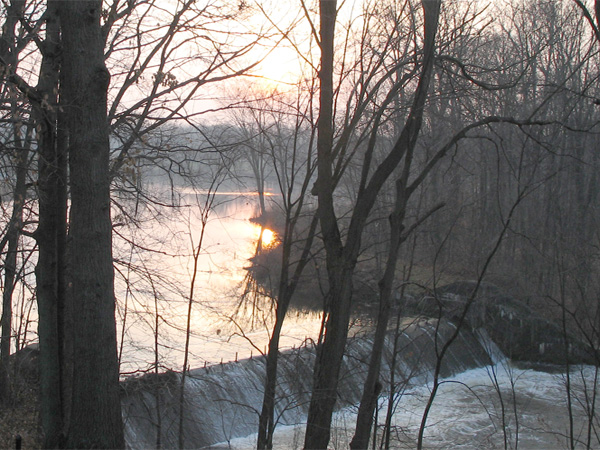
- Boys Dam and Hoffman Pond

Physical characteristics
- Source
  - location: Portage Lake, Kalamazoo County, Michigan
  - coordinates: 42.25532°N 85.35582°W
- Mouth
  - location: St. Joseph River, Michigan
  - coordinates: 41.94393°N 85.6311°W
- Length: 38.6 mi (62.1 km)
- Discharge
  - location: mouth
  - average: 210.37 cu ft/s (5.957 m^{3}/s) (estimate)

Portage River is a 38.6-mile-long (62.1 km) river that flows southward through Kalamazoo County and St. Joseph County, Michigan. Its headwaters are 8 miles (13 km) east of the city of Kalamazoo at Portage Lake, and the river flows southwest to its mouth within the city limits of Three Rivers, where it drains into the St. Joseph River.

== Origin of name ==
Portage, the French word for "carry", refers to transporting a canoe overland, either between waterways or around an obstacle. The French word is used, although the river was used by the Potawattomi and other Native Americans for trade and transportation before the French arrived. The Portage River and a major tributary, Portage Creek, form a key water link between the drainage basins of the Kalamazoo River and the St. Joseph River. Tributaries of the two rivers run within 1.25 miles (2.0 km) of each other within what is now the large Kalamazoo suburb of Portage. From the high ground of this suburb, two creeks, both named Portage Creek, run north and south toward their respective drainage basins. The suburban city, creeks, and river are all named after this portage or carrying-place for birch bark and dugout canoes, a key link in the Native American infrastructure of what was to become the state of Michigan.

== Impact of glaciation ==
The Wisconsin glaciation period left behind a large number of kettles, ponds, and bogs. The headwaters and upper reaches of the Portage River once contained countless examples of post-glacial wetlands. Farmers built drainage ditches to dry out many of the wetter flatlands for arable cropland, and significant population growth south of Kalamazoo has led to further alterations in the landscape. Many of the larger glacial lakes remain:

- Austin Lake, in Portage, is the largest lake in the Portage River drainage.
- Gourdneck Lake, near Portage, is so called because its unusual shape is said to resemble a mature gourd.
- Indian Lake is the site of a longtime campsite of the Potawatomi tribe of Native Americans.
- Portage Lake in St. Joseph County (not the source lake in Kalamazoo County with the same name) covers 510 acres (2.1 km^{2}).

== History of river ==
The Portage River was an early trade route for the Pottawatomi, Ojibwa, Ottawa, and French traders. A pow-wow is held annually in Three Rivers to celebrate this history, along with a reenactor camp of French traders. A famous battle between the Pottawatomi and the Shawnee under Chief Elkhart took place on the banks of the Portage River in 1802, and is commemorated by a plaque in Three Rivers.

Portage Creek (the south-flowing Portage Creek, part of the Portage River drainage) drops 8 feet (2.4 m) at what is now the town of Vicksburg. In 1831 John Vickers spied this power source and built a gristmill on the creek, thereby flooding Sunset Lake and founding the town that would be named after him.

Dutch and Low German farmers with experience in wetlands horticulture took charge of the river region's wetlands during the decades after the American Civil War. The southern Kalamazoo region was one of the first locations in the United States where celery for salads was grown. (Traditional English and American popular cooking traditions of that time demanded that all vegetables be boiled or otherwise cooked before being served.) For several generations the Portage River area led the nation in celery production. Other specialty crops grown on Portage River "muckland" included peppermint and spearmint. On the Portage River's high sandy banks further south, strawberries were cultivated. The best known strawberry farm was R. M. Kellogg's in Three Rivers, founded in 1896. The R. M. Kellogg farms also maintained a popular tourist attraction, the Kellogg Gardens, elaborate gardens with many unusual structures, next to the Portage River in the city of Three Rivers.

Although the river today is used almost exclusively for recreation, up until the early 1900s it served as a corridor for transportation and commerce. Frank Dentler of Parkville operated a paddle wheel steamboat for the transportation of goods to the railroad lines, down river to Three Rivers and up river to the Portage Station near Portage Lake (St. Joseph County.)

== The river today ==
Much of the Portage River remains wet and wooded today. Trees have been allowed to re-grow along the river's banks, which are unsuited for agriculture. The river is enjoyed by canoeists and kayakers. Fishing is excellent and includes largemouth bass, smallmouth bass, and walleye, but check the State of Michigan Department of Health's fish advisory before eating any river or lake fish.

The Portage River's banks form a riparian wetland ecosystem, rich in characteristic species such as painted turtles, wood ducks, and bullfrogs, as well as many rare and unusual native plants and plant communities. The Southwest Michigan Land Conservancy maintains the Hidden Marsh Sanctuary, a wilderness preserve and walking trail along the Portage River just north of the city of Three Rivers. One of the river's headwater bogs remains in conservancy status, namely Bishop's Bog in Portage, Michigan.

== Dams ==
Dams along the Portage River include the historic Cook's Mill Dam in Kalamazoo County, Parkville Dam and mill site near Parkville, and the Hoffman Street Dam and the Boy's Dam from Hoffman Pond in Three Rivers.
