= Harvey Alfred Miller =

American botanist (1928–2020)

Harvey Alfred Miller (October 19, 1928, Sturgis, Michigan – January 7, 2020, Palm Bay, Florida) was an American botanist, specializing in Pacific Islands bryophytes.

== Biography ==
After graduating from Sturgis High School in 1946, Miller matriculated at the University of Michigan, where he graduated in 1950 with a B.S. in botany. He graduated in botany in 1952 from the University of Hawaiʻi with an M.S. and in 1957 from Stanford University with a Ph.D. in philosophy and a focus in biology. As a postdoc he was an instructor at the University of Massachusetts. During the 1950s and until 1967 he was on the faculty of Ohio's Miami University, where he achieved the rank of associate professor. In 1968 he was a professor at Washington State University, where he became chair of the botany department. He later became professor and chair at Florida Technological University (which in 1978 was renamed the University of Central Florida). He held visiting professorships at the University of Guam and the University of Illinois. He was an adjunct professor at the University of West Alabama, Seminole State College of Florida, and Miami University (in Ohio). He was the author or coauthor of over 100 research articles. Miller was a licensed private plane pilot and had his first flying lessons when he was 14 years old.

His botanical travels have taken him to all fifty states including Alaska, the Aleutians and Hawaii, plus Canada, England, Wales, France, Netherlands, Switzerland, Germany, Denmark, Sweden, Soviet Union, Micronesia, Philippines, Japan, Fiji, Vanuatu, New Caledonia, Loyalty Islands, Indonesia, New Guinea, Australia, New Zealand, Puerto Rico, Virgin Islands, Costa Rica and Guadalupe Island Mexico.

He collected the first carbon samples that helped establish the carbon-14 dates for human migration across the Bering Straits to North America during the 1949-50 University of Michigan Expedition to the Aleutian Islands. ... He was Leader of the Miami University–Collegiate Rebel Expedition to Micronesia, and the University of Central Florida—ORSTOM Expedition to Vanuatu ... He was environmental consultant for Freeport-McMoRan Indonesia in New Guinea’s Puncak Jaya Mountains ...

Miller was a 1958 Guggenheim Fellow, a fellow of the American Association for the Advancement of Science, and served as president of the American Bryological and Lichenological Society (1964–1965) and president of the Florida Academy of Sciences (1981).

== Selected publications ==
=== Articles ===
- Miller, Harvey Alfred (1953). "Notes on Hawaiian Hepaticae: Frullaniaceae". The Bryologist. 56 (1): 40–48. doi:10.2307/3240230. JSTOR 3240230. 1953
- Crum, Howard; Miller, Harvey A. (1956). "Bryophytes from Guadalupe Island, Baja California". The Southwestern Naturalist. 1 (3): 116–120. doi:10.2307/3669133. JSTOR 3669133. 1956
- Scott, E. B.; Miller, Harvey A. (1958). "Notes on Hawaiian Hepaticae. II. Ricciaceae". The Bryologist. 61 (4): 367–370. doi:10.2307/3240169. JSTOR 3240169. 1958
- Scott, E. B.; Miller, Harvey A. (1959). "Notes on Hawaiian Hepaticae. IV. Herberta herpocladioides sp. nov". The Bryologist. 62 (2): 116–118. doi:10.2307/3240029. JSTOR 3240029. 1959
- Miller, Harvey A. (1960). "The Bryological Foray of the Ninth International Botanical Congress". The Bryologist. 63 (1): 53–59. doi:10.2307/3241173. JSTOR 3241173. 1960
- Miller, Harvey A. (1960). "A Preliminary List of Micronesian Bryophytes". The Bryologist. 63 (2): 116–125. doi:10.2307/3240888. JSTOR 3240888. 1960
- Bonner, C. E. B.; Miller, H. A. (1960). "Studies in Lejeuneaceae. I. The Typification of Lejeunea". The Bryologist. 63 (4): 217–225. doi:10.2307/3240558. JSTOR 3240558. 1960
- Miller, Harvey A. (1968). "The Herbaria of Miami University (MU) and Oberlin College (OC) Combined". Taxon. 17 (1): 57–60. doi:10.2307/1216154. JSTOR 1216154. 1968
- Miller, H. A.; Smith, Douglas R. (1968). "Mosses from Truk, Caroline Islands" (PDF). Micronesica. 4 (2): 213–237.
- Miller, H. A. (1971). "Bryophytes and environmental science". Plant Sciences Bulletin. 17 (4). Botanical Society of America: 34–37.
- Miller, H. A. (1982). "Bryophyte evolution and geography". Biological Journal of the Linnean Society. 18 (2): 145–196. doi:10.1111/j.1095-8312.1982.tb02036.x.
- Miller, Harvey A. (1988). "Pacific Bryophytes: 4. Epipterygium in Southern Melanesia". Systematic Botany. 13 (1): 133–137. doi:10.2307/2419249. JSTOR 2419249. 1988
- Miller, H. A.; Whittier, H. O. (1990). "Bryophyte floras of tropical Pacific islands". Tropical Bryology. 2: 167–175. doi:10.11646/BDE.2.1.15. S2CID 128266532.

=== Books and monographs ===
- Miller, Harvey Alfred (1956). A Phytogeographical Study of Hawaiian Hepaticae.
- Miller, Harvey Alfred (1971). Bryological Bibliography of the Tropical Pacific Islands, Especially Polynesia and Micronesia: Compiled for the Subcommittee for Bryophytes and Lichens of the Standing Committee on Pacific Botany of the Pacific Science Association.
- Miller, Harvey A.; Whittier, Henry O.; Whittier, Barbara A. (1978). Prodromus Florae Muscorum Polynesiae: With a Key to Genera. J. Cramer. ISBN 9783768211154.
