= White Pigeon Township, Michigan =

- Township
- Location within the state of Michigan White Pigeon Township, Michigan (the United States)
- Coordinates: 41°47′48″N 85°36′44″W
- Country: United States
- State: Michigan
- County: St. Joseph

Area
  - Total: 27.6 sq mi (71.4 km^{2})
  - Land: 25.5 sq mi (66.1 km^{2})
  - Water: 2.0 sq mi (5.3 km^{2})
- Elevation: 814 ft (248 m)

Population (2020)
  - Total: 3,762
  - Density: 147/sq mi (56.9/km^{2})
- Time zone: UTC-5 (Eastern (EST))
  - Summer (DST): UTC-4 (EDT)
- FIPS code: 26-86940
- GNIS feature ID: 1627266
- Website: Township website

White Pigeon Township is a civil township of St. Joseph County in the U.S. state of Michigan. The population was 3,762 at the 2020 census. The village of White Pigeon is located within the township.

== Geography ==
According to the United States Census Bureau, the township has a total area of 27.6 square miles (71 km^{2}), of which 25.5 square miles (66 km^{2}) is land and 2.0 square miles (5.2 km^{2}) (7.36%) is water. Klinger Lake is located in the northeast of the township, north of US-12. Nearby, the unincorporated community of Klingers straddles the eastern boundary of the township.

== Demographics ==
Historical population
Census	Pop.	Note	%±
1990	3,672		—
2000	3,847		4.8%
2010	3,755		−2.4%
2020	3,759		0.1%
2024 (est.)	3,893		3.6%
US Census:

As of the census of 2000, there were 3,847 people, 1,505 households, and 1,071 families residing in the township. The population density was 150.6 inhabitants per square mile (58.1/km^{2}). There were 1,845 housing units at an average density of 72.2 per square mile (27.9/km^{2}). The racial makeup of the township was 96.46% White, 0.18% African American, 0.60% Native American, 0.68% Asian, 0.08% Pacific Islander, 1.01% from other races, and 0.99% from two or more races. Hispanic or Latino of any race were 1.64% of the population.

There were 1,505 households, out of which 30.2% had children under the age of 18 living with them, 57.8% were married couples living together, 9.2% had a female householder with no husband present, and 28.8% were non-families. 22.9% of all households were made up of individuals, and 8.6% had someone living alone who was 65 years of age or older. The average household size was 2.55 and the average family size was 2.99.

In the township the population was spread out, with 25.4% under the age of 18, 7.9% from 18 to 24, 27.2% from 25 to 44, 26.9% from 45 to 64, and 12.7% who were 65 years of age or older. The median age was 38 years. For every 100 females, there were 93.7 males. For every 100 females age 18 and over, there were 92.6 males.

The median income for a household in the township was $42,908, and the median income for a family was $49,155. Males had a median income of $36,054 versus $21,690 for females. The per capita income for the township was $22,441. About 9.4% of families and 11.6% of the population were below the poverty line, including 19.0% of those under age 18 and 4.4% of those age 65 or over.
