= Portage Lake (St. Joseph County, Michigan) =

Lake in Michigan, United States

Coordinates: 42°2′55″N 85°30′42″W

Portage Lake is a 510-acre lake located near Mendon in the Michigan county of St. Joseph. A glacial-origin lake, it is fed and drained by the Portage River. The lake is variously reported as 37 feet and as 60 feet in maximum depth.

The lake was surveyed by the Michigan Department of Natural Resources in 1998. The survey uncovered significant sport fishery resources in the form of bluegill, yellow perch, black crappie, largemouth bass, and northern pike. Traps set by naturalists caught many turtles, including map turtles and painted turtles.
