= Leonidas Township, Michigan =

- Township
- Location within the state of Michigan Leonidas Township, Michigan (the United States)
- Coordinates: 42°1′17″N 85°21′10″W https://www.zipdatamaps.com/49066
- Country: United States
- State: Michigan
- County: St. Joseph

Area
  - Total: 36.2 sq mi (93.8 km^{2})
  - Land: 35.7 sq mi (92.5 km^{2})
  - Water: 0.50 sq mi (1.3 km^{2})
- Elevation: 866 ft (264 m)

Population (2020)
  - Total: 1,161
  - Density: 32.5/sq mi (12.6/km^{2})
- Time zone: UTC-5 (Eastern (EST))
  - Summer (DST): UTC-4 (EDT)
- ZIP code: 49066
- Area code: 269
- FIPS code: 26-47020
- GNIS feature ID: 1626606
- Website: Official website

Leonidas Township is a civil township of St. Joseph County in the U.S. state of Michigan. The population was 1,161 at the 2020 census.

== History ==
Settlers from New York came here in 1831. James and Robert Cowen built a mill along Nottawa Creek in this township in 1832 at a site called Cowen's Mills. The village of Leonidas was platted in 1846.

Another place called Factoryville was established around a sawmill on Nottawa Creek in 1839. A woolen factory was added to this site in 1842. It had a post office from 1888 until 1907.

== Geography ==
According to the United States Census Bureau, the township has a total area of 36.2 square miles (94 km^{2}), of which 35.7 square miles (92 km^{2}) is land and 0.5 square miles (1.3 km^{2}) (1.38%) is water.

== Demographics ==
As of the census of 2000, there were 1,239 people, 407 households, and 326 families residing in the township. The population density was 34.7 inhabitants per square mile (13.4/km^{2}). There were 432 housing units at an average density of 12.1 units per square mile (4.7 units/km^{2}). The racial makeup of the township was 97.50% White, 0.48% African American, 0.48% Native American, 0.24% from other races, and 1.29% from two or more races. Hispanic or Latino of any race were 0.48% of the population.

There were 407 households, out of which 37.1% had children under the age of 18 living with them, 67.8% were married couples living together, 8.6% had a female householder with no husband present, and 19.9% were non-families. 15.5% of all households were made up of individuals, and 7.4% had someone living alone who was 65 years of age or older. The average household size was 3.04 and the average family size was 3.41.

In the township the population was spread out, with 31.9% under the age of 18, 7.4% from 18 to 24, 25.3% from 25 to 44, 24.1% from 45 to 64, and 11.3% who were 65 years of age or older. The median age was 34 years. For every 100 females, there were 97.3 males. For every 100 females age 18 and over, there were 93.1 males.

The median income for a household in the township was $42,417, and the median income for a family was $47,321. Males had a median income of $32,500 versus $21,488 for females. The per capita income for the township was $14,983. About 8.6% of families and 9.6% of the population were below the poverty line, including 14.1% of those under age 18 and 3.1% of those age 65 or over.
