= Burr Oak Creek =

Burr Oak Creek may refer to:

- Burr Oak Creek (Little Blue River), a stream in Missouri
- Burr Oak Creek (Nodaway River tributary), a stream in Missouri
