= Mattie A. Freeman =

American freethinker and lecturer

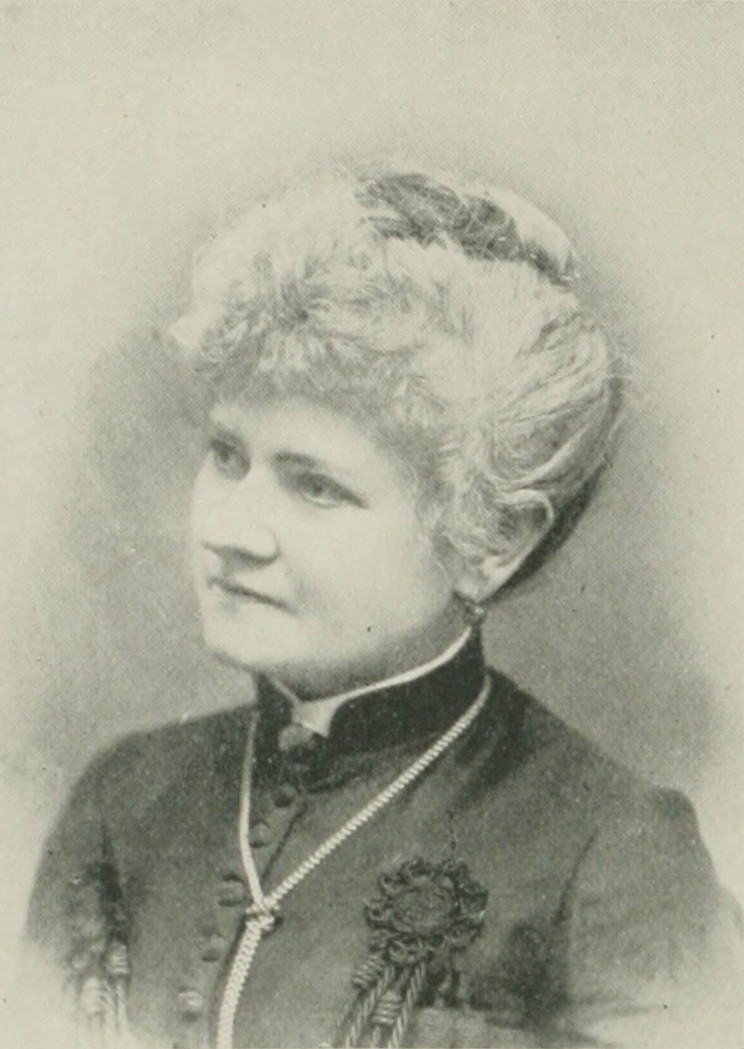
- "A Woman of the Century"
- Born: August 9, 1839; Sturgis, Michigan
- Died: September 7, 1901 (aged 62); Chicago, Illinois
- Occupations: Freethinker, abolitionist, writer, lecturer
- Organization(s): Chicago Secular Union; American Secular Union
- Movement: Freethought

Mattie A. Freeman (9 August 1839 – 7 September 1901) was an American freethinker, abolitionist, writer, and lecturer. She became well known as a secularist speaker, was corresponding secretary of the American Secular Union, and was described by a correspondent of The Truth Seeker as a "feminine Ingersoll".

== Early life ==
Mattie A. Freeman was born in Sturgis, Michigan on 9 August 1839. Her ancestors were French and German, Americanized by generations. Her father was a freethinker (described as a "Thomas Paine Infidel"), while her mother was a Baptist. Her maternal grandmother, whose maiden name was Elizabeth Ann Harris, was cousin to John Quincy Adams. Though her mother tried to keep the children from what she considered the contamination of infidelity - bringing them to revivals and other Baptist experiences - Mattie became a freethinker in her early youth.

An intelligent child, Freeman devoted herself to the study of science fiction, literature, and philosophy. Her first public discussion was at the age of fourteen, after an associate editor of a weekly newspaper had written an article on the inferiority of women. Using a pen-name, the schoolgirl responded, the controversy enduring across several issues.

At fifteen, she taught her first school. It was a failure, with the older students refusing to obey her, and she abandoned the venture after six weeks. Around that time she heard reformer and abolitionist Abby Kelley Foster speak on abolition, inspiring her own hatred of slavery. Soon after, invited to speak publicly, she delivered a radical anti-slavery speech. Later, Freeman was hired to take charge of a winter school, receiving 1/3 of the pay that had been given to the male teachers, but praised for her work. Soon after the war, in a city in Illinois, she heard a prominent minister preach a scathing sermon against women. Indignant, a committee of the suffrage association asked Freeman to reply. She consented, giving a well-received response, and went on to deliver many public lectures. M.M. Trumbull of Chicago later wrote:

I am always delighted and instructed when I hear Mrs Freeman lecture. Mrs Freeman's voice should be heard in the largest halls in the city, aye, and beyond the city too, for I believe I am quite within bounds when I say there is not in this whole country three women of equal genius.

After the Great Chicago Fire OF 1871, Freeman devoted herself to literary work, writing for four years for a Chicago paper. She also authored a number of serials, short stories and sketches, including Somebody's Ned (1850) - a story of prison reform.

== Secularism ==
At that time, Freeman began working for the Chicago Secular Union. She gave the first lecture on Henry George's Progress and Poverty ever delivered in Chicago. She was interested in the reform movement, and especially in woman's emancipation, convinced it underpinned all other questions. In 1891, she published the Chicago Liberal, a freethought paper with an additional focus on women's issues.

At the thirteenth annual congress of the American Secular Union held in Chicago, Freeman was elected chairman of the finance committee, and in 1891 corresponding secretary. In an 1887 article published in The Truth Seeker, Secretary of the American Secular Union E.A. Stevens wrote that:

Mrs Freeman's lectures bristle with profound logic, bravely and beautifully expressed in choicest language. For one hour, without manuscript and without a flaw, she held her auditors in that stillness that allows no word to be lost. If years of unpaid incessant unselfish devotion of talents of the highest order for the upbuilding of the Secular cause entitle anyone to our thanks, that person is the bright, brave little moral heroine who has enduring fame in literature as well as on the rostrum and of whom we of Chicago are justly proud, Mrs M.A. Freeman, chairman of the finance committee of the American Secular Union.

Mattie A. Freeman died on 7 September 1901. A funeral address was given by Judge Charles Burlingame Waite, who described Freeman as:

a very talented woman; a remarkable woman, in some respects. She was a logical thinker, a good writer, and had a wonderful gift of oratory. As а speaker she occupied a very high position in the society of which she was an officer, and among Freethinkers and Liberals throughout the country... Performing her duty as she understood it in this life, and doing what good she could in this world, she troubled herself not about another life or another world. To any one endeavoring to draw out her opinions on such matters, her invariable response was: "That is something we know nothing about."
