= Sturgis High School =

Location
- 216 Vinewood Ave; Sturgis, MI 49091; United States
- Coordinates: 41.797256°N 85.400593°W

Information
- Type: Public
- Motto: "We are for you."
- School district: Sturgis Public Schools
- Principal: Nick Herblet
- Teaching staff: 48.25 (FTE)
- Grades: 9-12
- Enrollment: 973 (2023-2024)
- Student to teacher ratio: 20.17
- Colors: Orange and black
- Mascot: Trojans
- Rival: Three Rivers High School
- Website: https://shs.sturgisps.org/

Sturgis High School is located in Sturgis, Michigan and is part of the Sturgis Public Schools school district.

== Demographics ==
The demographic breakdown of the 955 students enrolled in the 2018–19 school year was:

- Male - 50.1%
- Female - 49.9%
- Asian - 1.4%
- Black - 1.8%
- Hispanic - 36.3%
- Native Hawaiian/Pacific Islander - 0.1%
- White - 58.3%
- Multiracial - 2.1%

In addition, 52.1% of students were eligible for reduced-price or free lunch.

== Notable people ==
- Tom Bodett (born 1955), American author, voice actor, radio host, and spokesman for Motel 6
- Harvey Alfred Miller (1928–2020), American botanist
- John Ray (1926–2007), Sturgis High football coach
- Albert M. Todd (1850–1931), United States Representative from Michigan
- Asher Wojciechowski (born 1988), professional baseball player
