= Wolf Lake, Indiana =

- Unincorporated community
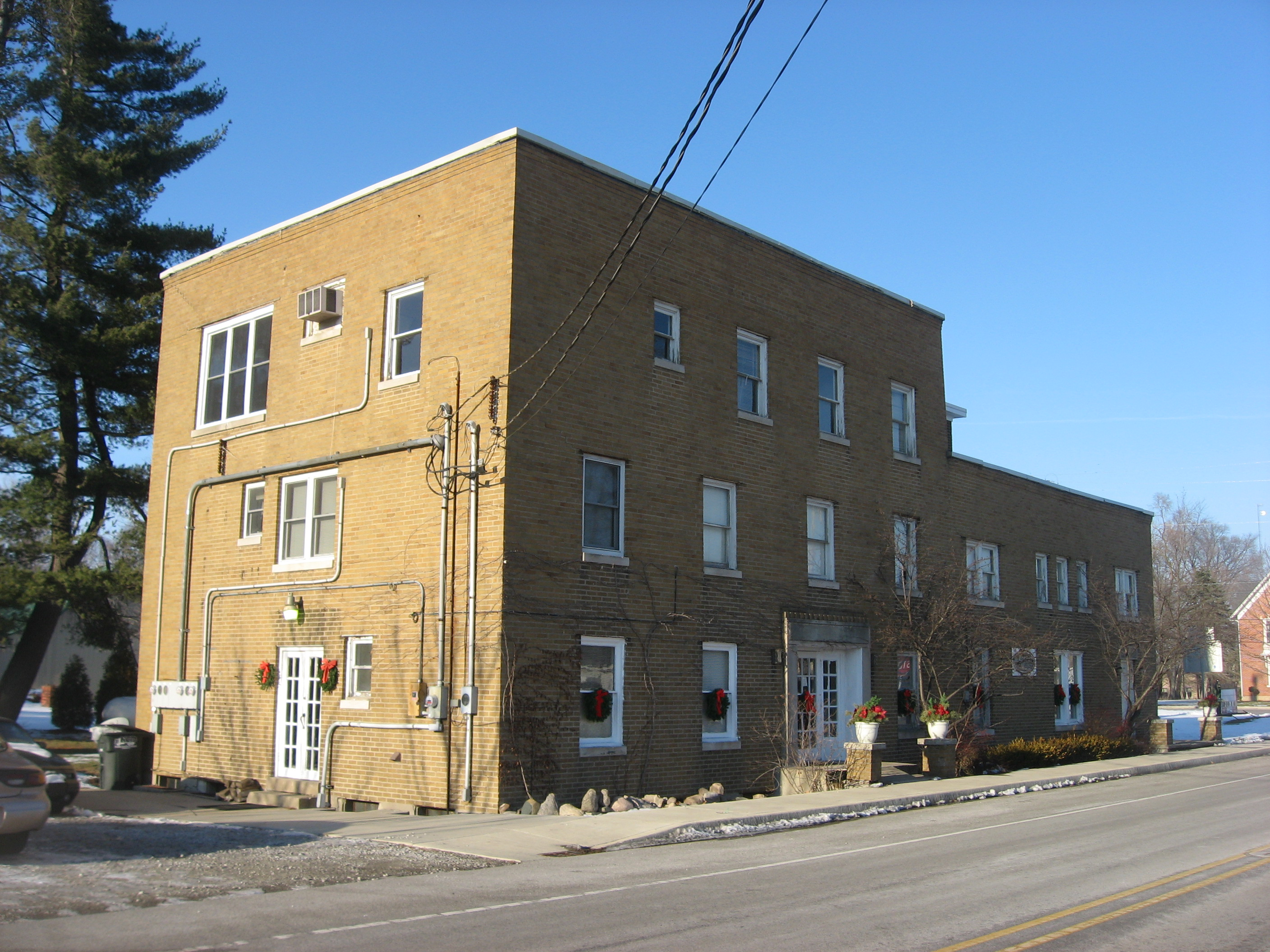
- Luckey Hospital, a historic site in the community

- Location within Indiana Location within the United States
- Coordinates: 41°20′06″N 85°29′45″W
- Country: United States
- State: Indiana
- County: Noble
- Township: Noble
- Elevation: 915 ft (279 m)
- Time zone: UTC-5 (Eastern (EST))
  - Summer (DST): UTC-4 (EDT)
- ZIP code: 46701
- Area code: 260
- FIPS code: 18-85130
- GNIS feature ID: 450614

Wolf Lake is an unincorporated community in Noble Township, Noble County, in the U.S. state of Indiana.

== History ==
Wolf Lake was platted in 1836, taking its name from the nearby eponymous lake. A post office has been in operation at Wolf Lake since 1834.

The former Luckey Hospital was listed on the National Register of Historic Places in 2013.

== Education ==
Wolf Lake High School made their mark on the Indiana basketball map by winning the regional title in 1942. The Wolf Lake Wolves, with an enrollment of 123 students, beat Fort Wayne Central High School, moving on to the semi-state where they lost to Muncie Burris High School. The small school from northeast Indiana is the smallest school from this part of the state to make it to the semi-state round of the state basketball tournament. The Wolves were led by a senior class of Art Keister, Paul Keister, Roger Stangland and Delbert Hartman. Beginning their high school careers in 1939–40, this class led their team to three Noble County championships, 50 straight regular season wins and a 70–5 record over three years.

== Festivals ==
Each August, citizens celebrate their heritage with the Onion Days Festival.

== Demographics ==
Historical population
Census	Pop.	Note	%±
2023 (est.)	337

The United States Census Bureau defined Wolf Lake (the census used Wolflake) as a census designated place in the 2022 American Community Survey.
