= Parksville =

Parksville may refer to:

- Parksville, British Columbia, a city in Canada
  - Parksville Junction, British Columbia, an unincorporated community in the city
- Parksville, Kentucky, a town in the United States
- Parksville, South Carolina, a town in the United States
- Parksville, New York, United States
- Parksville, Tennessee, United States

== See also ==
- Nanaimo-Parksville
- Parkville (disambiguation)
