= Noble Township, Noble County, Indiana =

Noble Township
- Township
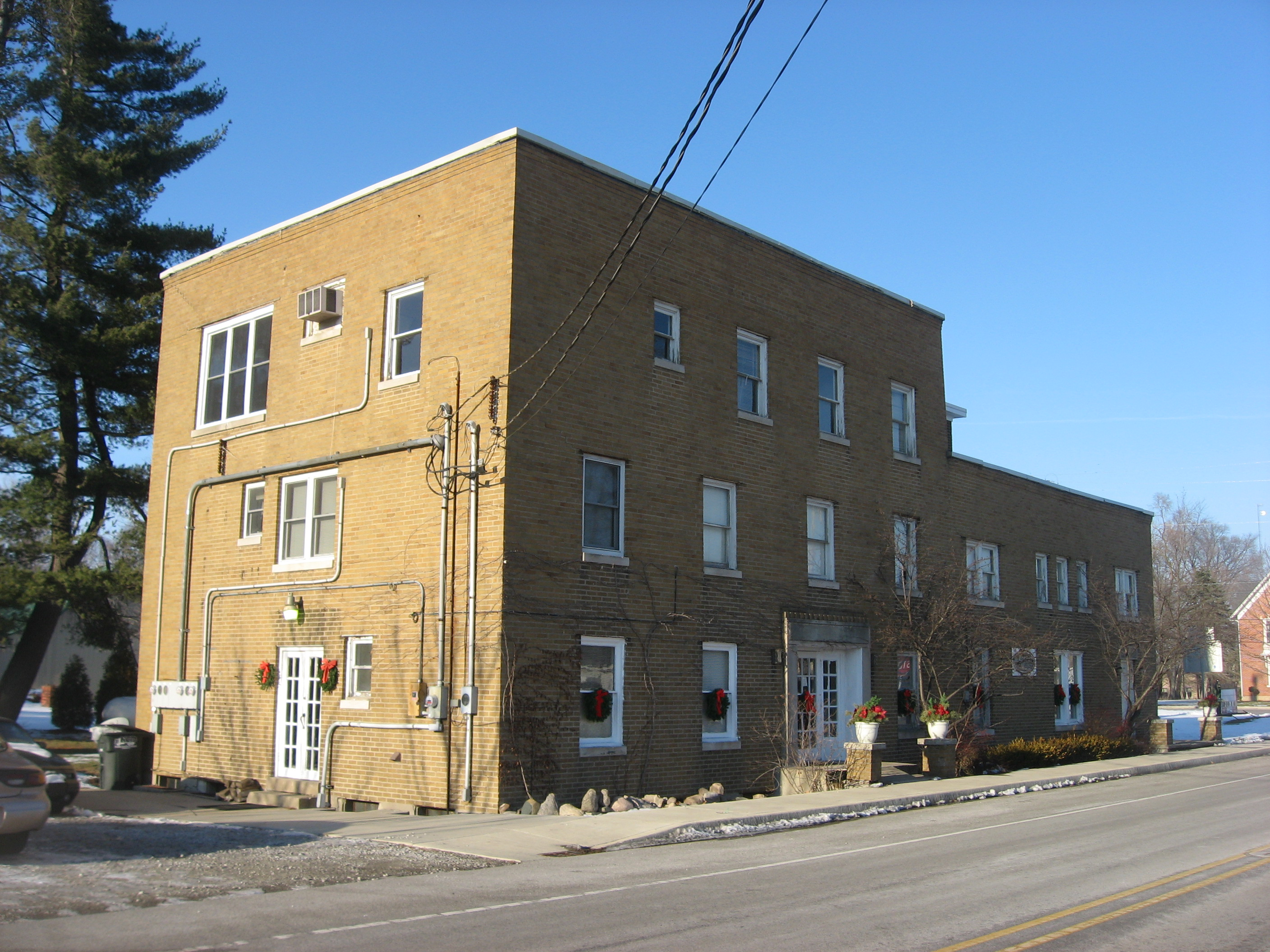
- The Luckey Hospital in Wolf Lake

- Coordinates: 41°18′48″N 85°28′41″W
- Country: United States
- State: Indiana
- County: Noble

Government
  - Type: Indiana township

Area
  - Total: 35.15 sq mi (91.0 km^{2})
  - Land: 33.78 sq mi (87.5 km^{2})
  - Water: 1.37 sq mi (3.5 km^{2})
- Elevation: 912 ft (278 m)

Population (2020)
  - Total: 3,011
  - Density: 91.6/sq mi (35.4/km^{2})
- Time zone: UTC-5 (Eastern (EST))
  - Summer (DST): UTC-4 (EDT)
- Area code: 260
- FIPS code: 18-54108
- GNIS feature ID: 453672

Noble Township is one of thirteen townships in Noble County, Indiana. As of the 2020 census, its population was 3,011 (down from 3,094 at 2010) and it contained 1,501 housing units.

== History ==
The former Luckey Hospital was listed on the National Register of Historic Places in 2013.

== Geography ==
According to the 2010 census, the township has a total area of 35.15 square miles (91.0 km^{2}), of which 33.78 square miles (87.5 km^{2}) (or 96.10%) is land and 1.37 square miles (3.5 km^{2}) (or 3.90%) is water.

=== Unincorporated towns ===
- Bear Lake at 41.3225017°N 85.5183691°W
- Burr Oak at 41.3231034°N 85.4330352°W
- Merriam at 41.2872696°N 85.4344239°W
- Wolf Lake at 41.3350476°N 85.4958146°W

(This list is based on USGS data and may include former settlements.)
