= Merriam, Indiana =

- Unincorporated community and Census designated place
- Location within Indiana Location within the United States
- Coordinates: 41°17′13″N 85°26′00″W
- Country: United States
- State: Indiana
- County: Noble
- Township: Noble
- Elevation: 938 ft (286 m)
- Time zone: UTC-5 (Eastern (EST))
  - Summer (DST): UTC-4 (EDT)
- ZIP code: 46701
- Area code: 260
- FIPS code: 18-48510
- GNIS feature ID: 2830482

Merriam is an unincorporated community in Noble Township, Noble County, in the U.S. state of Indiana.

== History ==
A post office was established at Merriam in 1853, and remained in operation until it was discontinued in 1907. According to Ronald L. Baker, the name may honor Mason M. Merriam or a member of his family. Mason M. Merriam operated a local store in the 1840s.

== Demographics ==
The United States Census Bureau defined Merriam as a census designated place in the 2022 American Community Survey.
