= Luckey Hospital =

- U.S. National Register of Historic Places
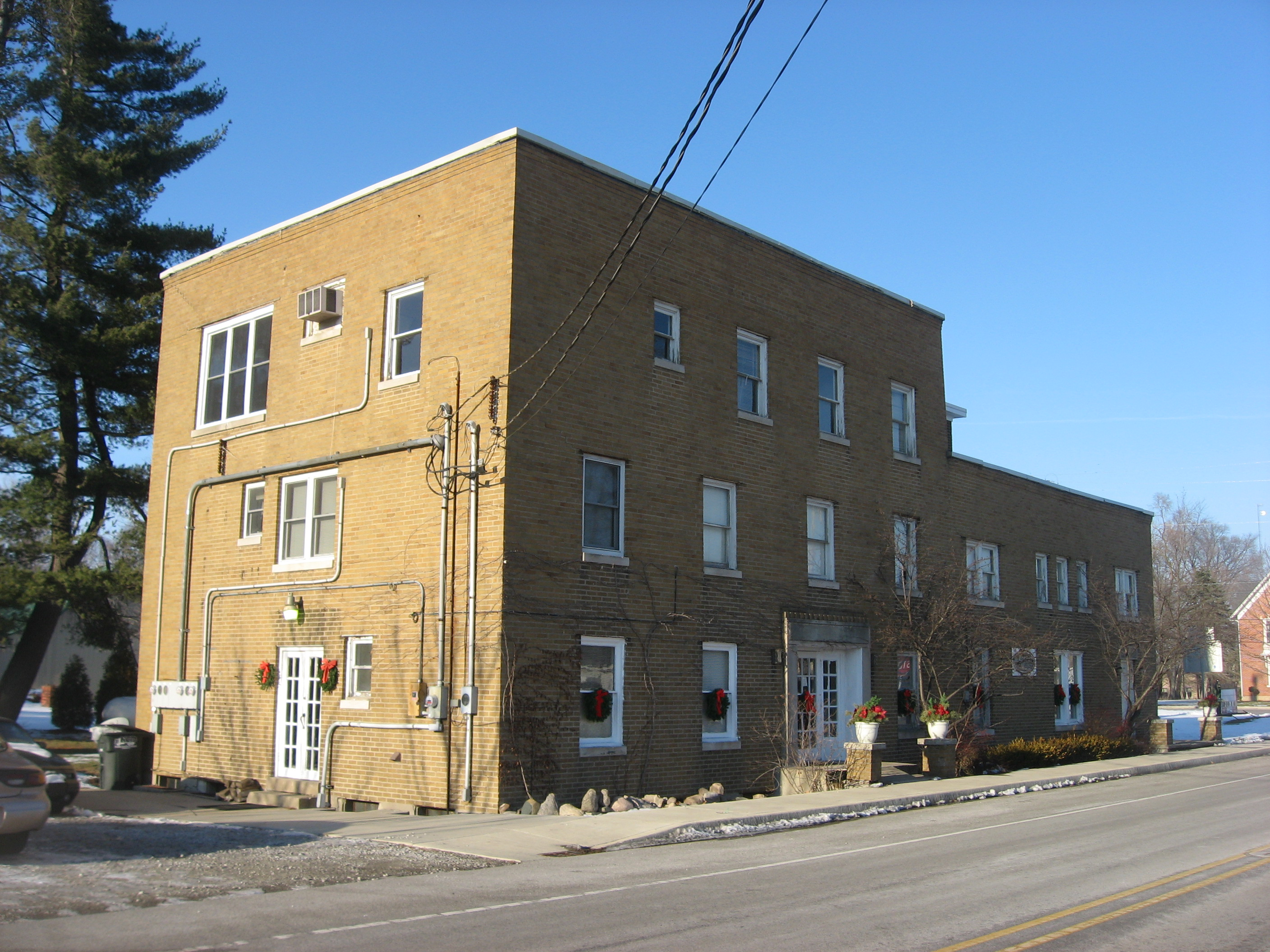
- Luckey Hospital, January 2013

- Location within Indiana Location within the United States
- Location: Junction of U.S. Route 33 and State Road 109 at Wolf Lake, Indiana
- Coordinates: 41°20′00″N 85°29′39″W
- Area: Less than 1 acre (0.40 ha)
- Built: 1929
- Built by: Hiatt Brothers
- Architect: Luckey, Harold
- NRHP reference No.: 13000090
- Added to NRHP: March 20, 2013

Luckey Hospital is a historic hospital building located in Noble Township, Noble County, Indiana. It was built in 1929, and is a three-story, tall brick building with an attached two-story section. It has a tall parapet and rests on a full basement. The building housed a private medical facility until 1961 and now houses a museum.

It was listed on the National Register of Historic Places in 2013.
