= Burr Oak, Michigan =

- Village
- Location of Burr Oak with St. Joseph County, Michigan
- Coordinates: 41°50′50″N 85°19′16″W
- Country: United States
- State: Michigan
- County: St. Joseph

Area
  - Total: 1.01 sq mi (2.61 km^{2})
  - Land: 1.00 sq mi (2.60 km^{2})
  - Water: 0 sq mi (0.00 km^{2})
- Elevation: 879 ft (268 m)

Population (2020)
  - Total: 753
  - Density: 748.7/sq mi (289.07/km^{2})
- Time zone: UTC-5 (Eastern (EST))
  - Summer (DST): UTC-4 (EDT)
- Zip Code: 49030
- Area code: 269
- FIPS code: 26-11920
- GNIS feature ID: 2397505

Burr Oak is a village in St. Joseph County in the U.S. state of Michigan. As of the 2020 census, Burr Oak had a population of 753. The village is located within Burr Oak Township.

== History ==
The area, in southeastern St. Joseph County, was first settled in 1835. The first post office was built in 1837. The village was platted in 1851. In 1852, land for a railroad station was donated by William Lock, on the condition that the town be renamed "Lock's Station," which it was. Five years later, however, by popular demand the town assumed its original name, and was officially incorporated into a village in 1859.

== Geography ==
According to the United States Census Bureau, the village has a total area of 1.00 square mile (2.59 km^{2}), all land.

== Demographics ==
Historical population
| Census | Pop. | Note | %± |
|---|---|---|---|
| 1860 | 666 | | — |
| 1870 | 724 | | 8.7% |
| 1880 | 721 | | −0.4% |
| 1890 | 687 | | −4.7% |
| 1900 | 744 | | 8.3% |
| 1910 | 752 | | 1.1% |
| 1920 | 589 | | −21.7% |
| 1930 | 680 | | 15.4% |
| 1940 | 706 | | 3.8% |
| 1950 | 814 | | 15.3% |
| 1960 | 867 | | 6.5% |
| 1970 | 873 | | 0.7% |
| 1980 | 853 | | −2.3% |
| 1990 | 882 | | 3.4% |
| 2000 | 797 | | −9.6% |
| 2010 | 828 | | 3.9% |
| 2020 | 753 | | −9.1% |
U.S. Decennial Census

=== 2010 census ===
As of the census of 2010, there were 828 people, 285 households, and 201 families residing in the village. The population density was 828.0 inhabitants per square mile (319.7/km^{2}). There were 327 housing units at an average density of 327.0 per square mile (126.3/km^{2}). The racial makeup of the village was 96.0% White, 0.5% African American, 0.5% Native American, 0.7% Asian, 0.6% from other races, and 1.7% from two or more races. Hispanic or Latino of any race were 3.3% of the population.

There were 285 households, of which 39.6% had children under the age of 18 living with them, 46.3% were married couples living together, 15.8% had a female householder with no husband present, 8.4% had a male householder with no wife present, and 29.5% were non-families. 22.5% of all households were made up of individuals, and 9.2% had someone living alone who was 65 years of age or older. The average household size was 2.91 and the average family size was 3.40.

The median age in the village was 33.1 years. 29.3% of residents were under the age of 18; 8.6% were between the ages of 18 and 24; 26.2% were from 25 to 44; 24.9% were from 45 to 64; and 10.7% were 65 years of age or older. The gender makeup of the village was 50.4% male and 49.6% female.

=== 2000 census ===
As of the census of 2000, there were 797 people, 303 households, and 199 families residing in the village. The population density was 794.4 inhabitants per square mile (306.7/km^{2}). There were 322 housing units at an average density of 321.0 per square mile (123.9/km^{2}). The racial makeup of the village was 97.87% White, 0.63% African American, 0.38% Native American, 0.25% Asian, 0.75% from other races, and 0.13% from two or more races. Hispanic or Latino of any race were 1.51% of the population.

There were 303 households, out of which 28.7% had children under the age of 18 living with them, 49.8% were married couples living together, 10.2% had a female householder with no husband present, and 34.0% were non-families. 27.1% of all households were made up of individuals, and 15.2% had someone living alone who was 65 years of age or older. The average household size was 2.63 and the average family size was 3.17.

In the village, the population was spread out, with 26.9% under the age of 18, 9.0% from 18 to 24, 30.4% from 25 to 44, 19.9% from 45 to 64, and 13.8% who were 65 years of age or older. The median age was 35 years. For every 100 females, there were 97.8 males. For every 100 females age 18 and over, there were 91.1 males.

The village's median household income was $34,792, while the median family income stood at $37,969. Males had a median income of $31,442 versus $21,364 for females. The per capita income for the village was $17,463. About 5.5% of families and 8.5% of the population were below the poverty line, including 9.7% of those under age 18 and 4.1% of those age 65 or over.
