= Parkville, Michigan =

- Unincorporated community
- Location within the state of Michigan
- Coordinates: 42°00′57″N 85°32′52″W
- Country: United States
- State: Michigan
- County: St. Joseph
- Township: Park
- Elevation: 830 ft (250 m)
- Time zone: UTC-5 (Eastern (EST))
  - Summer (DST): UTC-4 (EDT)
- Area code: 269
- GNIS feature ID: 1624812

Parkville is an unincorporated community in St. Joseph County in the U.S. state of Michigan. It is in Park Township on the banks of the Portage River at 42°00′57″N 85°32′52″W.

== History ==
Park Township was organized in 1838, and Parkville was laid out in 1851 by Luther Carlton and surveyed by James Hutchinson. The first lot was purchased by Mary King for ten dollars. A mill pond and races on the Portage River provided power for a woolens factory built in 1851, a saw mill, and a grist mill built in 1853. In 1877 it had the mills and factory, three churches, two blacksmiths, a tavern, and a school. The churches were Seventh-day Adventist, Presbyterian, and Methodist Episcopal.

The dedication of the Seventh-day Adventist meeting house in Parkville was on January 12, 1861, and was attended by Ellen G. White. She reportedly had a vision at that time of a "terrible war", this was three months before the firing on Ft. Sumter that began the US Civil War. (Reported in the book "Divine Predictions", by F.C.Gilbert, pages 214–222.) The Adventist church was later purchased for the Parkville Grange Hall, and the Presbyterian Church became the town hall. The Parkville Adventist church was moved in the 1990s to Battle Creek, MI, where it was restored to become a part of the Adventist Historical Village. The brick Methodist church still stands, although it is no longer a church. (Recently Demolished)

Frank Dentler of Parkville invented the Dentler Bagger, one of the first automated pieces of farm equipment, for weighing and measuring the output of a threshing machine. He also operated a paddle wheel steamboat which carried goods from the factory and mills of Parkville to railroad stations on the Portage River.
