= Burr Oak, Missouri =

Extinct hamlet in Missouri, U.S.

Coordinates: 39°03′33″N 90°45′50″W

Burr Oak is an extinct town in Lincoln County, in the U.S. state of Missouri.

Variant names were "Burr Oak Valley" and "Burroak". A post office called Burr Oak Valley was established in 1875, the name was changed to Burroak in 1895, the name was changed again to Burr Oak in 1899, and the post office closed in 1905. The community was named for a grove of burr oak trees near the original town site. The names are descriptive of the trees in the vicinity, an American oak whose acorns have large cups with burs on them. It was also called Robinson's Mill in honor of the George Robinson lumber mill there.

Some locals refer Burr Oak township as a city, however, it is not officially a city, or a town, it's a township.
