= Burr Oak, Noble County, Indiana =

Burr Oak
- Unincorporated community
- Location within Indiana Location within the United States
- Coordinates: 41°19′23″N 85°25′59″W
- Country: United States
- State: Indiana
- County: Noble
- Township: Noble
- Elevation: 915 ft (279 m)
- Time zone: UTC-5 (Eastern (EST))
  - Summer (DST): UTC-4 (EDT)
- ZIP code: 46701
- Area code: 260
- GNIS feature ID: 450522

Burr Oak is an unincorporated community in Noble Township, Noble County, in the U.S. state of Indiana.

== History ==
A post office was established at Burr Oak in 1848, but was soon discontinued, in 1850. The community probably took its name from the nearby Burr Oak Schoolhouse, built in 1840.

== Geography ==
Burr Oak is located at 41°19′23″N 85°25′59″W.
