= Burr Oak Creek (Little Blue River tributary) =

Stream in Jackson County, Missouri, USA

Coordinates: 39.0881°N 94.3097°W

Burr Oak Creek is a stream in Jackson County in the U.S. state of Missouri. It is a tributary of Little Blue River.

Burr Oak Creek was named for the burr oak timber along its course.

== See also ==
- List of rivers of Missouri
