= Sturgis, Michigan =

- City
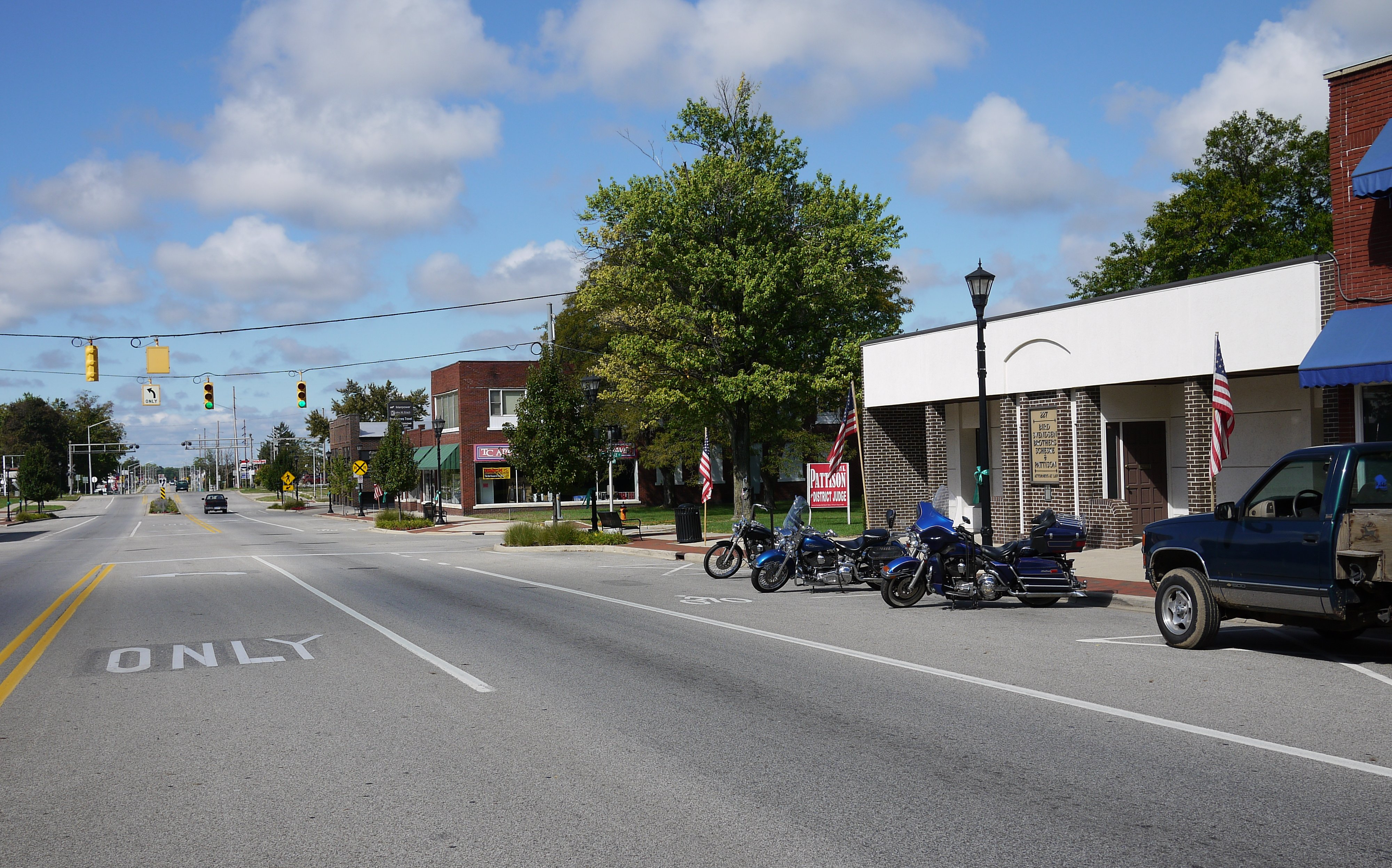

- Seal

- Location of Sturgis, Michigan
- Coordinates: 41°47′57″N 85°25′9″W
- Country: United States
- State: Michigan
- County: St. Joseph

Area
  - Total: 6.78 sq mi (17.57 km^{2})
  - Land: 6.78 sq mi (17.57 km^{2})
  - Water: 0 sq mi (0.00 km^{2})
- Elevation: 915 ft (279 m)

Population (2020)
  - Total: 11,082
  - Density: 1,633.9/sq mi (630.84/km^{2})
- Time zone: UTC-5 (Eastern (EST))
  - Summer (DST): UTC-4 (EDT)
- FIPS code: 26-76960
- GNIS feature ID: 1624965
- Website: https://www.sturgismi.gov/

Sturgis is a city in St. Joseph County in the U.S. state of Michigan. The population was 11,082 at the 2020 census. The city is located at the northeast corner of Sturgis Township and at the intersection of US 12 and M-66. Sturgis is just north of the Michigan–Indiana border and the I-80/90 Indiana Toll Road.

Sturgis has been assigned a ZIP code of 49091.

== Geography ==
Sturgis is located at 41°47′57″N 85°25′09″W. According to the United States Census Bureau, the city has a total area of 6.49 square miles (16.81 km^{2}), all land.

== Transportation ==
=== Major highways ===
- US 12 runs east and west through the city.
- M-66 runs north and south through the city.
- I-80 / I-90 / Indiana Toll Road has an exit within three miles of Sturgis.

=== Airport ===
The City owns and operates Kirsch Municipal Airport (KIRS), which is located in the northwest corner of the city. Kirsch Municipal is a general aviation airport and features two runways; the primary runway is 5,200 feet (1,600 m) long with a secondary, crosswind runway 3,457 feet (1,054 m) long.

=== Railroad ===
Sturgis is served by Michigan Southern Railroad Company for commercial rail service.

The historic Sturgis Train Depot, built in 1895, is one of the oldest train depots in West Michigan. In 2014, it was moved across town and is now being renovated to become the home of the Sturgis Historical Museum.

== History ==
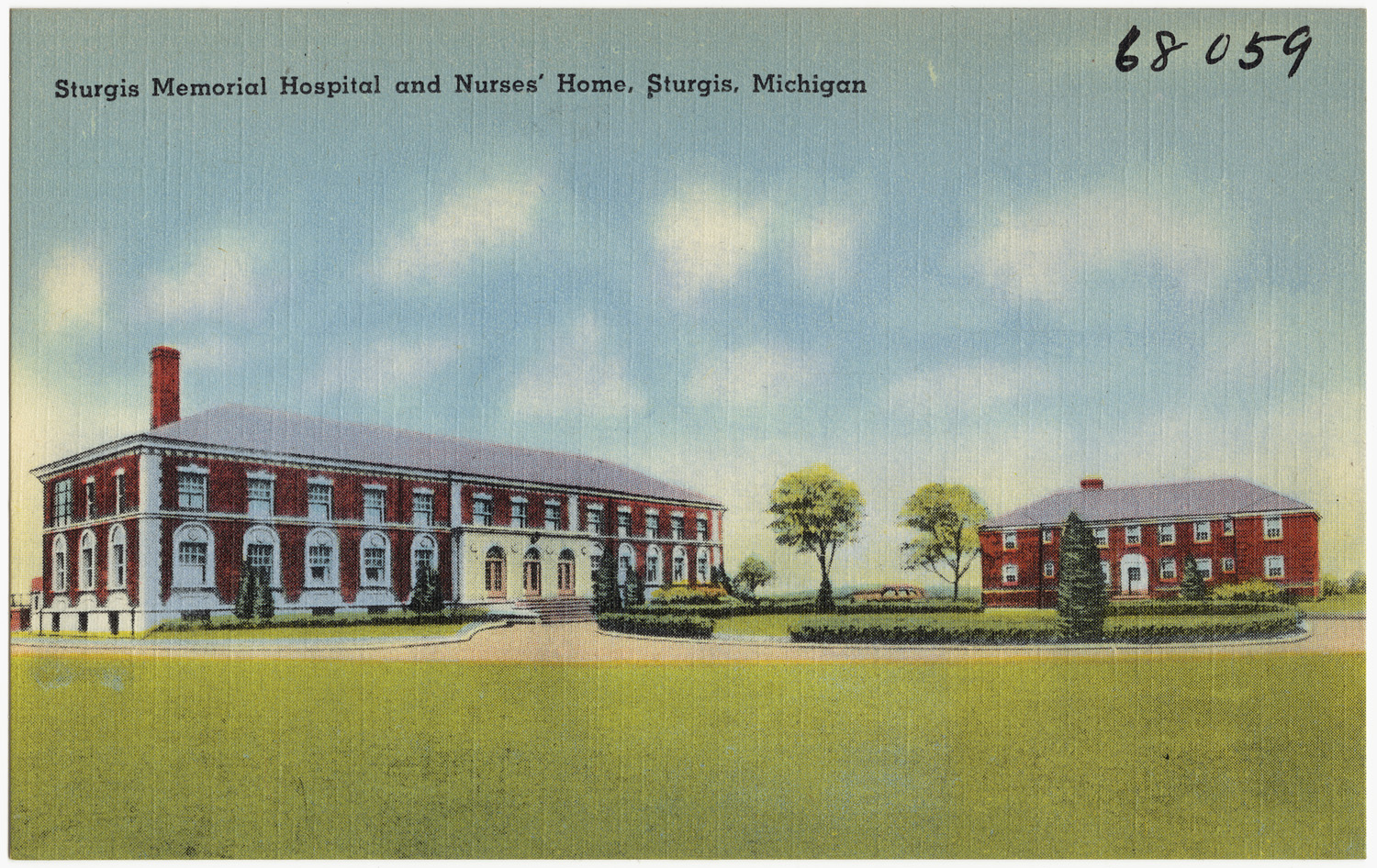
The Sturgis Memorial Hospital was built in 1925 and was updated for medical offices in 1992.

=== Founding of the community ===
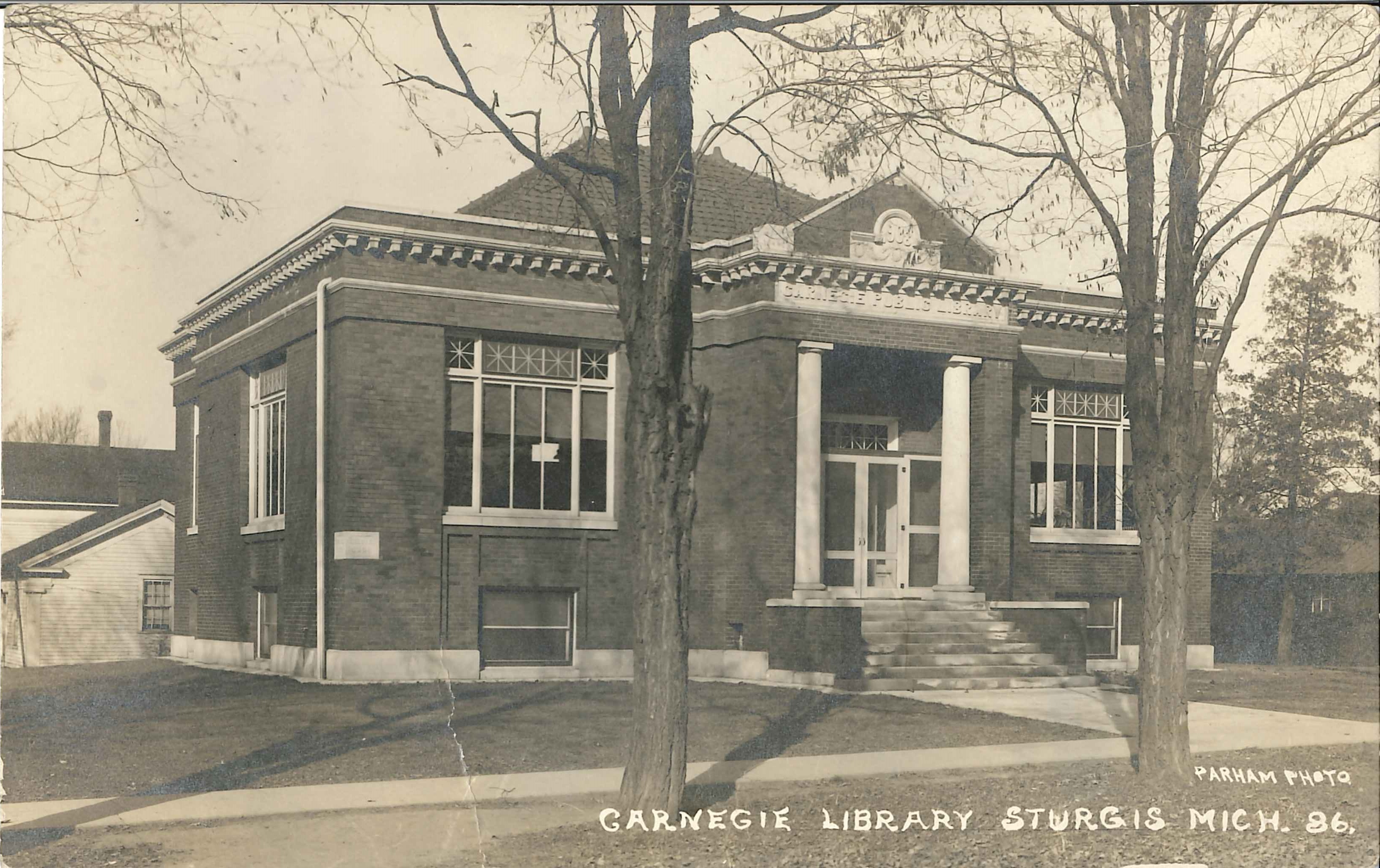
Construction of the Carnegie Library in Sturgis began in 1908 with a dedication on April 2, 1909.

In 1827, Judge John Sturgis came to the St. Joseph Valley area in southern Michigan territory and settled in what is now Sturgis. The original site of his home can be seen at Pioneer Park, maintained by the City of Sturgis. Legend has it that Sturgis was chosen as the town's name because Mrs. John Sturgis baked a pan of biscuits and sent them to a surveying party near their cabin. Lewis Cass, who later became governor, was part of that surveying party. When the time came to name the town, Governor Cass remembered the biscuits and was insistent that the town be named Sturgis. In 1896, Sturgis officially became a city.

=== Sturgis: the "Electric City" ===
Sturgis is known as the "Electric City" due to its municipal electric utility and hydroelectric dam, which date back to the early days of the community. The City-owned electric department has served the Sturgis area since the city's inception in 1896. In 1909, the City of Sturgis approved construction of a hydroelectric dam on the St. Joseph River near Centreville, Michigan. The dam began operation on September 3, 1911, and continues to serve the community. In 2011, the City celebrated the centennial of the Dam as part of "Sturgis Dam Days."

=== Sister City ===
Sturgis is a Sister City to Wiesloch, Germany. In 1966, the cities of Wiesloch and Sturgis decided to form a Sister City partnership that grew out of President Eisenhower's People-to-People program which was formed to increase cultural awareness and promote friendship. In 1967 Wiesloch formally began the cultural exchange by sending a community choir to Sturgis. In 1969 Sturgis reciprocated, sending its community choir to Wiesloch. In 1977, the exchange program was expanded to include students, who each year spend three weeks in their partner's home. In 1989 a Sturgis teacher worked in Wiesloch as part of the Sister City program. This teacher exchange continues periodically as teachers from Wiesloch work in Sturgis and vice versa.

In 2016, Sturgis and Wiesloch celebrated the 50th Anniversary of their Sister City partnership.

=== Kickoff city for Michigan Week ===
For many years, in the third week of May, Sturgis served as the kickoff city for Michigan Week, a statewide celebration. Many prominent political figures walked in the parade annually. These included State Representatives and State Senators as well as the 6th District U.S. Representative and periodically the Governor of Michigan. With statewide celebration of Michigan Week waning, in 2010, Sturgis ended the tradition of holding the Michigan Week Kick-Off, opting to celebrate Sturgis Dam Days in June. Sturgis Dam Days was held in honor of the hydroelectric dam. The 100-year anniversary of the Sturgis Dam was celebrated at the Sturgis Dam Days in 2011. In 2012, the Sturgis community began celebrating Sturgis Fest during the last week in June.

=== Sturgis Rail Depot ===
Sturgis Railroad Depot in 2019, after it was moved and restored

On June 23–24, 2014, the historic Sturgis Rail Depot was moved from its location on West Main & N. Clay Streets to a more central location on W. Chicago Road. The 120-year-old building, featuring masonry walls up to 2 feet thick and weighing 304 tons, was moved by Wolfe House & Building Movers. The building was elevated by a Unified Jacking System and mounted on the Buckingham Dolly System for the quarter-mile move across town.

The Depot underwent renovations to be used as a museum by the Sturgis Historical Society.

=== Abbott plant for infant formula ===
Abbott Laboratories produces infant formula at a plant in Sturgis. In February 2022, the plant was shut down due to bacteria in some of the infant formula produced there, which led to a nationwide shortage. The plant resumed production in June 2022 after receiving FDA clearance, first making specialty formula for infants with special dietary needs. The operations at the plant were a focus of an investigation launched by the House Oversight Committee.

=== Sturges-Young Auditorium ===
The Sturges-Young Auditorium opened in 1955, notable for its Modernist architecture and 986-seat capacity. On March 22, 1974, American bandleader Duke Ellington gave his last performance at Sturges-Young Auditorium, two months before his death.

== Government ==
The City of Sturgis is a council-manager form of government with a nine-member city commission. The city is divided into four precincts and two members of the commission are elected from each precinct with one member elected from the city at large. Members elected from precincts serve a term of four years while the member at large serves a two-year term. Each year in November the commission nominates one of its members as mayor and another as vice-mayor. The current mayor is Frank Perez and the current vice-mayor is Aaron Miller.

The city commission is the legislative body, responsible for the passage of municipal ordinances and the overall direction of City. The city commission appoints a professional city manager, who manages the day-to-day operations of the city, as well as the city attorney, city assessor, city treasurer, and city clerk. The commission sets policy to be carried out by the city manager and city staff.

== Demographics ==
Historical population
Census	Pop.	Note	%±
1860	1,020		—
1870	1,768		73.3%
1880	2,060		16.5%
1890	2,489		20.8%
1900	2,465		−1.0%
1910	3,635		47.5%
1920	5,995		64.9%
1930	6,950		15.9%
1940	7,214		3.8%
1950	7,786		7.9%
1960	8,915		14.5%
1970	9,295		4.3%
1980	9,468		1.9%
1990	10,130		7.0%
2000	11,285		11.4%
2010	10,994		−2.6%
2020	11,082		0.8%
U.S. Decennial Census

=== Racial and ethnic composition ===
Sturgis city, Michigan – Racial and ethnic composition Note: the US Census treats Hispanic/Latino as an ethnic category. This table excludes Latinos from the racial categories and assigns them to a separate category. Hispanics/Latinos may be of any race.
Race / Ethnicity (NH = Non-Hispanic)	Pop 2000	Pop 2010	Pop 2020	% 2000	% 2010	% 2020
White alone (NH)	9,424	7,977	7,013	83.51%	72.56%	63.28%
Black or African American alone (NH)	115	144	159	1.02%	1.31%	1.43%
Native American or Alaska Native alone (NH)	32	21	14	0.28%	0.19%	0.13%
Asian alone (NH)	78	96	108	0.69%	0.87%	0.97%
Native Hawaiian or Pacific Islander alone (NH)	0	1	0	0.00%	0.01%	0.00%
Other race alone (NH)	9	20	38	0.08%	0.18%	0.34%
Mixed race or Multiracial (NH)	128	225	670	1.13%	2.05%	6.05%
Hispanic or Latino (any race)	1,499	2,510	3,080	13.28%	22.83%	27.79%
Total	11,285	10,994	11,082	100.00%	100.00%	100.00%

=== 2020 census ===
As of the 2020 census, Sturgis had a population of 11,082. The median age was 34.5 years. 28.2% of residents were under the age of 18 and 14.2% of residents were 65 years of age or older. For every 100 females there were 95.3 males, and for every 100 females age 18 and over there were 91.1 males age 18 and over.

99.2% of residents lived in urban areas, while 0.8% lived in rural areas.

There were 4,242 households in Sturgis, of which 34.6% had children under the age of 18 living in them. Of all households, 38.8% were married-couple households, 19.7% were households with a male householder and no spouse or partner present, and 31.8% were households with a female householder and no spouse or partner present. About 32.2% of all households were made up of individuals and 13.6% had someone living alone who was 65 years of age or older.

There were 4,562 housing units, of which 7.0% were vacant. The homeowner vacancy rate was 1.5% and the rental vacancy rate was 6.1%.

Racial composition as of the 2020 census
Race	Number	Percent
White	7,360	66.4%
Black or African American	166	1.5%
American Indian and Alaska Native	84	0.8%
Asian	108	1.0%
Native Hawaiian and Other Pacific Islander	0	0.0%
Some other race	2,077	18.7%
Two or more races	1,287	11.6%

=== 2010 census ===
As of the Census of 2010, there were 10,994 people, 4,088 households, and 2,632 families residing in the city. The population density was 1,694.0 inhabitants per square mile (654.1/km^{2}). There were 4,595 housing units at an average density of . The racial makeup of the city was 73.6% White, 1.4% African American, 0.3% Native American, 0.9% Asian, 1.6% from other races, and 3.2% from two or more races. Hispanic or Latino of any race were 20.8% of the population.

There were 4,088 households, of which 39.1% had children under the age of 18 living with them, 42.8% were married couples living together, 15.0% had a female householder with no husband present, 6.6% had a male householder with no wife present, and 35.6% were non-families. 30.0% of all households were made up of individuals, and 13% had someone living alone who was 65 years of age or older. The average household size was 2.65 and the average family size was 3.28.

The median age in the city was 32.3 years. 30% of residents were under the age of 18; 9.2% were between the ages of 18 and 24; 26.1% were from 25 to 44; 22% were from 45 to 64; and 12.6% were 65 years of age or older. The gender makeup of the city was 47.3% male and 52.7% female.

=== 2000 census ===
As of the census of 2000, there were 11,285 people, 4,293 households, and 2,726 families residing in the city. The population density was 1,894.5 inhabitants per square mile (731.5/km^{2}). There were 4,529 housing units at an average density of 760.3 per square mile (293.6/km^{2}). As of 2000, the racial makeup of the city was 91% White, 1% African American, 0.2% Native American, 1.4% Asian, 4.4% from other races, and 2.0% from two or more races. Hispanic or Latino of any race were 20% of the population.

There were 4,293 households, out of which 35.3% had children under the age of 18 living with them, 45.6% were married couples living together, 12.9% had a female householder with no husband present, and 36.5% were non-families. 30.2% of all households were made up of individuals, and 14.6% had someone living alone who was 65 years of age or older. The average household size was 2.57 and the average family size was 3.20.

In the city, the population was spread out, with 28.2% under the age of 18, 11.5% from 18 to 24, 27.9% from 25 to 44, 17.7% from 45 to 64, and 14.6% who were 65 years of age or older. The median age was 32 years. For every 100 females, there were 92.5 males. For every 100 females age 18 and over, there were 86.1 males.

The median income for a household in the city was $33,838, and the median income for a family was $43,381. Males had a median income of $29,508 versus $21,810 for females. The per capita income for the city was $15,990. About 11.2% of families and 16.2% of the population were below the poverty line, including 23.5% of those under age 18 and 10.0% of those age 65 or over.

== Education ==
The Sturgis Public Schools has six schools, including the Sturgis High School.

== Notable people ==
- Tom Bodett, author, voice actor, radio host and spokesperson for Motel 6, was born in Illinois, raised in Sturgis.
- Cameron S. Brown, state senator of the 16th Senate District of Michigan 2003–2010, is from Sturgis.
- Mattie A. Freeman, freethinker, abolitionist, writer, and lecturer, was born in Sturgis.
- Walter T. Kelley, innovator of Beekeeping methods and materials.
- June MacCloy, actress, was born in Sturgis.
- Perle Mesta, socialite and Ambassador to Luxembourg, was born in Sturgis.
- Frank W. Parker, New Mexico Supreme Court justice (1912–1932), was born in Sturgis.
- William Balser Skirvin, business executive and oilman, was born in Sturgis.
- Marlin Stutzman, Current congressman for Indiana's 3rd district, was born in Sturgis.
- Verne Troyer, actor, was born in Sturgis, but grew up in the nearby town of Centreville, Michigan.
- Paul Weatherwax, film editor, two-time Academy Award winner, was born in Sturgis.

== See also ==
- 2022 United States infant formula shortage § Recall and plant shutdown
