= Sturgis Township, Michigan =

- Township
- Location within the state of Michigan Sturgis Township, Michigan (the United States)
- Coordinates: 41°47′4″N 85°27′2″W
- Country: United States
- State: Michigan
- County: St. Joseph

Area
  - Total: 18.0 sq mi (46.7 km^{2})
  - Land: 18.0 sq mi (46.5 km^{2})
  - Water: 0.077 sq mi (0.2 km^{2})
- Elevation: 883 ft (269 m)

Population (2020)
  - Total: 2,042
  - Density: 114/sq mi (43.9/km^{2})
- Time zone: UTC-5 (Eastern (EST))
  - Summer (DST): UTC-4 (EDT)
- FIPS code: 26-76980
- GNIS feature ID: 1627130
- Website: sturgistownship.org

Sturgis Township is a civil township of St. Joseph County in the U.S. state of Michigan. The population was 2,042 at the 2020 census, down from 2,261 at the 2010 census. The City of Sturgis is located at the northeast corner of the township and is administratively autonomous.

== Geography ==
According to the United States Census Bureau, the township has a total area of 18.0 square miles (47 km^{2}), of which 17.9 square miles (46 km^{2}) is land and 0.1 square mile (0.26 km^{2}) (0.39%) is water.

== Demographics ==
As of the census of 2000, there were 2,403 people, 841 households, and 641 families residing in the township. The population density was 133.9 inhabitants per square mile (51.7/km^{2}). There were 889 housing units at an average density of 49.6 per square mile (19.2/km^{2}). The racial makeup of the township was 94.26% White, 0.71% African American, 0.21% Native American, 1.62% Asian, 2.12% from other races, and 1.08% from two or more races. Hispanic or Latino of any race were 6.45% of the population.

There were 841 households, out of which 39.1% had children under the age of 18 living with them, 59.9% were married couples living together, 10.3% had a female householder with no husband present, and 23.7% were non-families. 18.4% of all households were made up of individuals, and 7.4% had someone living alone who was 65 years of age or older. The average household size was 2.80 and the average family size was 3.18.

In the township the population was spread out, with 30.5% under the age of 18, 7.2% from 18 to 24, 30.1% from 25 to 44, 21.2% from 45 to 64, and 11.0% who were 65 years of age or older. The median age was 33 years. For every 100 females, there were 100.4 males. For every 100 females age 18 and over, there were 99.6 males.

The median income for a household in the township was $40,982, and the median income for a family was $46,324. Males had a median income of $34,537 versus $25,952 for females. The per capita income for the township was $18,367. About 1.3% of families and 4.1% of the population were below the poverty line, including 0.6% of those under age 18 and 5.4% of those age 65 or over.
