= Burr Oak Township, Michigan =

- Township
- Location within the state of Michigan Burr Oak Township, Michigan (the United States)
- Coordinates: 41°51′23″N 85°20′41″W
- Country: United States
- State: Michigan
- County: St. Joseph

Area
  - Total: 36.1 sq mi (93.4 km^{2})
  - Land: 35.6 sq mi (92.1 km^{2})
  - Water: 0.50 sq mi (1.3 km^{2})
- Elevation: 866 ft (264 m)

Population (2020)
  - Total: 2,639
  - Density: 74.2/sq mi (28.7/km^{2})
- Time zone: UTC-5 (Eastern (EST))
  - Summer (DST): UTC-4 (EDT)
- FIPS code: 26-11940
- GNIS feature ID: 1626007
- Website: Township website

Burr Oak Township is a civil township of St. Joseph County in the U.S. state of Michigan. As of the 2020 census, the township population was 2,639. The Village of Burr Oak is located within the township.

== Geography ==
According to the United States Census Bureau, the township has a total area of 36.1 square miles (93 km^{2}), of which 35.6 square miles (92 km^{2}) is land and 0.5 square miles (1.3 km^{2}) (1.36%) is water.

== Demographics ==
As of the census of 2000, there were 2,739 people, 980 households, and 735 families residing in the township. The population density was 77.0 inhabitants per square mile (29.7/km^{2}). There were 1,065 housing units at an average density of 29.9 per square mile (11.5/km^{2}). The racial makeup of the township was 97.55% White, 0.40% African American, 0.40% Native American, 0.29% Asian, 0.55% from other races, and 0.80% from two or more races. Hispanic or Latino of any race were 1.61% of the population.

There were 980 households, out of which 35.4% had children under the age of 18 living with them, 61.4% were married couples living together, 8.3% had a female householder with no husband present, and 25.0% were non-families. 19.5% of all households were made up of individuals, and 9.7% had someone living alone who was 65 years of age or older. The average household size was 2.79 and the average family size was 3.16.

In the township the population was spread out, with 28.4% under the age of 18, 8.8% from 18 to 24, 28.8% from 25 to 44, 22.0% from 45 to 64, and 12.0% who were 65 years of age or older. The median age was 35 years. For every 100 females, there were 99.3 males. For every 100 females age 18 and over, there were 100.6 males.

The median income for a household in the township was $44,875, and the median income for a family was $48,458. Males had a median income of $36,036 versus $21,567 for females. The per capita income for the township was $18,266. About 4.8% of families and 6.9% of the population were below the poverty line, including 9.5% of those under age 18 and 2.0% of those age 65 or over.
