= St. Joseph County, Michigan =

County in Michigan, United States

- County
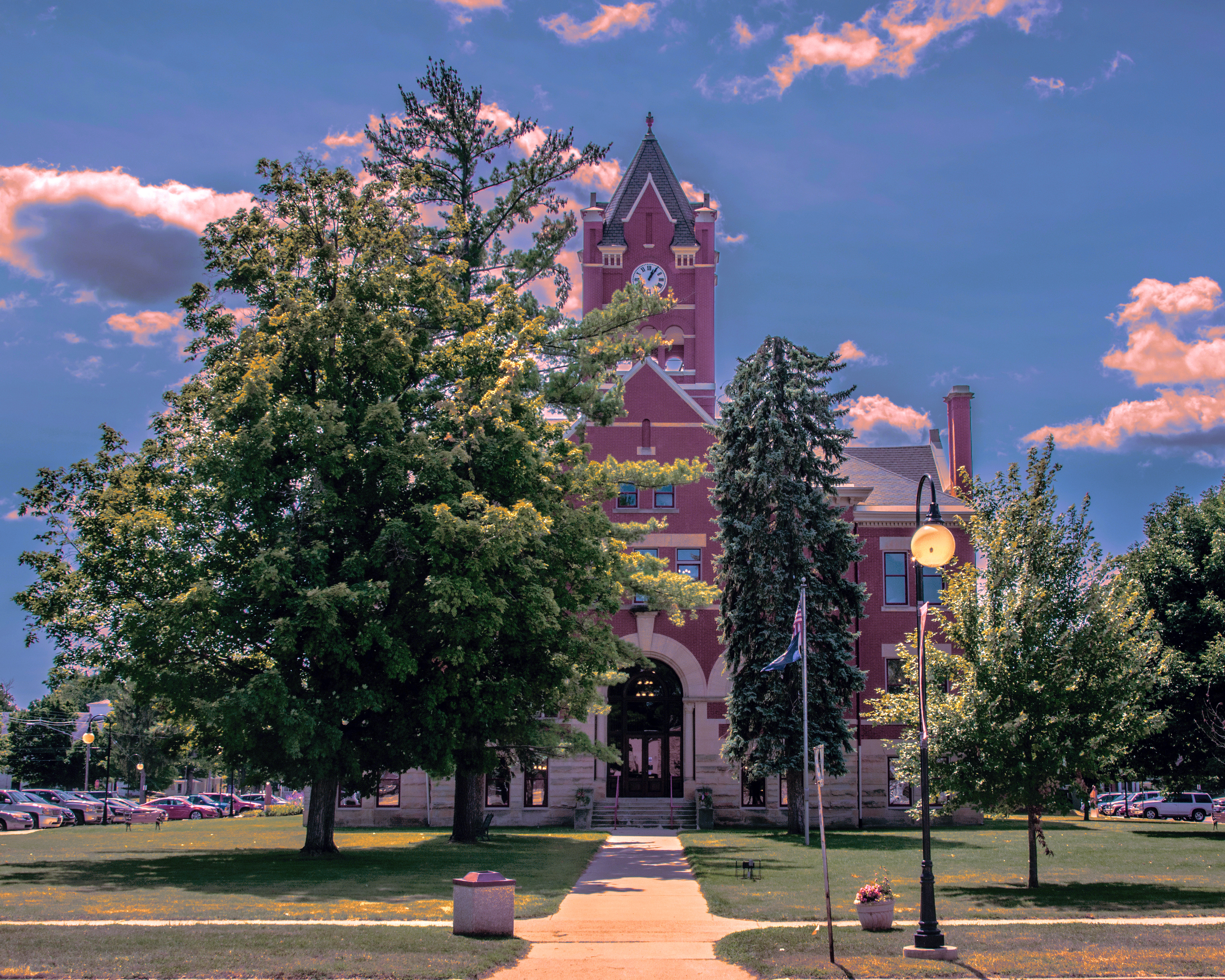
- St. Joseph County Courthouse in Centreville

- Seal

- Location within the U.S. state of Michigan
- Coordinates: 41°55′N 85°32′W
- Country: United States
- State: Michigan
- Founded: 1829
- Named for: Fort St. Joseph
- Seat: Centreville
- Largest city: Sturgis

Area
  - Total: 521 sq mi (1,350 km^{2})
  - Land: 501 sq mi (1,300 km^{2})
  - Water: 20 sq mi (52 km^{2}) 3.9%

Population (2020)
  - Total: 60,939
  - Estimate (2025): 60,968 ▲
  - Density: 122/sq mi (47/km^{2})
- Time zone: UTC−5 (Eastern)
  - Summer (DST): UTC−4 (EDT)
- Congressional district: 6th
- Website: stjosephcountymi.gov

Saint Joseph County is a county located in the U.S. state of Michigan, on the central southern border with Indiana. As of the 2020 United States census, the population was 60,939. The county seat is Centreville.

French colonists in the late 17th century were the first Europeans to explore this territory, and they named the St. Joseph River for the patron saint of New France. This area was not part of the United States until after the American Revolutionary War. After the 1821 Treaty of Chicago was signed, regional tribes of the indigenous peoples ceded much land to the United States, opening the area for American settlement. The county was set off and organized by the Michigan Territory legislature in 1829; it was named for the river.

The area is home to the oldest and largest Amish community in Michigan.

St. Joseph County comprises the Sturgis, MI Micropolitan Statistical Area and is included in the Kalamazoo-Battle Creek-Portage, MI Combined Statistical Area.

== History ==
This area was settled by members of the three Algonquian-speaking tribes of the Council of Three Fires: the Potawatomi, Odawa, and Chippewa (known as Ojibwa in Canada). French explorers in a party led by Father Hennepin came upriver from Lake Michigan in 1679. A Jesuit mission was established near where the French later built Fort St. Joseph, and they named the waterway as the St. Joseph River.

== Geography ==
According to the U.S. Census Bureau, the county has a total area of 521 square miles (1,350 km^{2}), of which 501 square miles (1,300 km^{2}) is land and 20 square miles (52 km^{2}) (3.9%) is water. It is the fourth-smallest county in Michigan by total area. The entire county lies in the Saint Joseph River watershed.

=== Adjacent counties ===
- Van Buren County – northwest
- Kalamazoo County – north
- Calhoun County – northeast
- Branch County – east
- LaGrange County, Indiana – south
- Elkhart County, Indiana – southwest
- Cass County – west

=== Major highways ===
- US 12 runs east–west across the lower portion of the county and passes White Pigeon and Sturgis.
- US 131 runs north–south through the western portion of the county and passes Three Rivers, Constantine, and White Pigeon.
- Bus. US 131 runs north–south through eastern Three Rivers.
- M-60 runs east-northeast through the upper portion of the county and passes Three Rivers, Parkville, Mendon, Leonidas.
- M-66 enters the southeastern portion of the county from Star Mill, Indiana, and runs north to an intersection with M-60, two miles (3.2 km) east of Mendon.
- M-86 runs east–west through the center of the county, entering at Colon, passing Nella and Centreville to an intersection with M-60 at Three Rivers.
- M-103 enters the southwestern tip of the county and runs north two miles (3.2 km) to intersection with US 12 near the western county line.
- M-216 enters the northwestern portion of the county from Marcellus and runs east to an intersection with US 131 four miles (6.4 km) north of Three Rivers.

Strictly speaking, the Indiana Toll Road does not enter St. Joseph County, but it has an interchanges with US 131 barely within Indiana. Although M-66 does not quite reach the Toll Road, the toll road interchange is in clear sight from M-66 before it becomes Indiana State Road 9.

== Demographics ==
Historical population
Census	Pop.	Note	%±
1830	1,313		—
1840	7,068		438.3%
1850	12,725		80.0%
1860	21,262		67.1%
1870	26,275		23.6%
1880	26,626		1.3%
1890	23,356		−12.3%
1900	23,889		2.3%
1910	25,499		6.7%
1920	26,818		5.2%
1930	30,618		14.2%
1940	31,749		3.7%
1950	35,071		10.5%
1960	42,332		20.7%
1970	47,392		12.0%
1980	56,083		18.3%
1990	58,913		5.0%
2000	62,422		6.0%
2010	61,295		−1.8%
2020	60,939		−0.6%
2025 (est.)	60,968	▲	0.0%
US Decennial Census; 1790-1960 1900-1990; 1990-2000

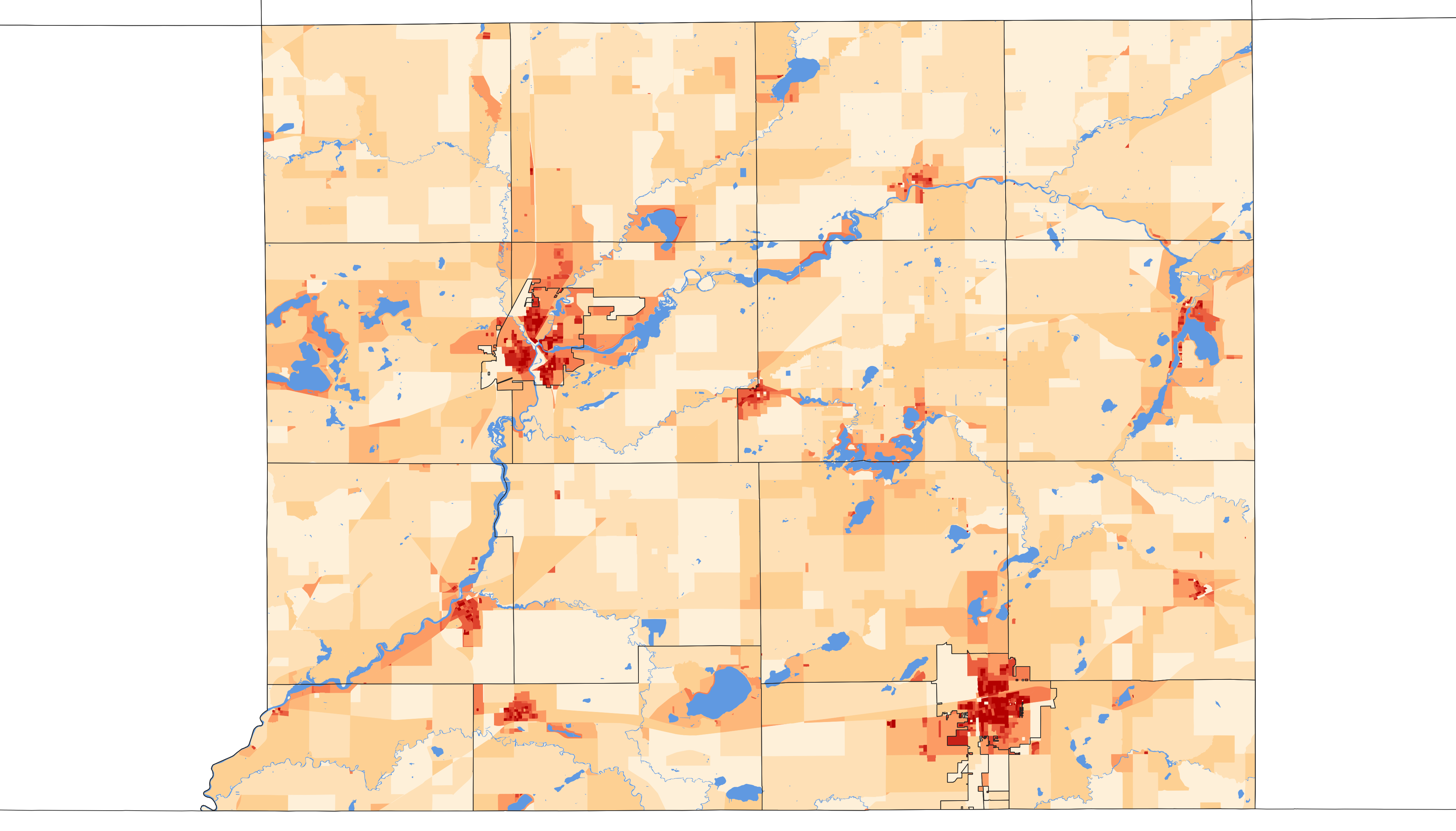
2020 population density of St. Joseph County MI by census block

=== Racial and ethnic composition ===
St. Joseph County, Michigan – Racial and ethnic composition Note: the US Census treats Hispanic/Latino as an ethnic category. This table excludes Latinos from the racial categories and assigns them to a separate category. Hispanics/Latinos may be of any race.
Race / Ethnicity (NH = Non-Hispanic)	Pop 1980	Pop 1990	Pop 2000	Pop 2010	Pop 2020	% 1980	% 1990	% 2000	% 2010	% 2020
White alone (NH)	53,994	56,296	56,994	53,930	50,674	96.28%	95.56%	91.30%	87.98%	83.16%
Black or African American alone (NH)	1,338	1,592	1,561	1,555	1,341	2.39%	2.70%	2.50%	2.54%	2.20%
Native American or Alaska Native alone (NH)	143	209	208	234	151	0.25%	0.35%	0.33%	0.38%	0.25%
Asian alone (NH)	167	255	353	416	414	0.30%	0.43%	0.57%	0.68%	0.68%
Native Hawaiian or Pacific Islander alone (NH)	x	x	4	2	9	x	x	0.01%	0.00%	0.01%
Other race alone (NH)	55	15	59	47	174	0.10%	0.03%	0.09%	0.08%	0.29%
Mixed race or Multiracial (NH)	x	x	755	1,077	2,749	x	x	1.21%	1.76%	4.51%
Hispanic or Latino (any race)	386	546	2,488	4,034	5,427	0.69%	0.93%	3.99%	6.58%	8.91%
Total	56,083	58,913	62,422	61,295	60,939	100.00%	100.00%	100.00%	100.00%	100.00%

=== 2020 census ===
As of the 2020 census, the county had a population of 60,939. The median age was 39.7 years. 24.5% of residents were under the age of 18 and 18.4% of residents were 65 years of age or older. For every 100 females there were 100.1 males, and for every 100 females age 18 and over there were 98.0 males age 18 and over.

The racial makeup of the county was 84.6% White, 2.2% Black or African American, 0.5% American Indian and Alaska Native, 0.7% Asian, <0.1% Native Hawaiian and Pacific Islander, 5.2% from some other race, and 6.8% from two or more races. Hispanic or Latino residents of any race comprised 8.9% of the population.

36.3% of residents lived in urban areas, while 63.7% lived in rural areas.

There were 23,557 households in the county, of which 30.5% had children under the age of 18 living in them. Of all households, 49.5% were married-couple households, 18.4% were households with a male householder and no spouse or partner present, and 23.8% were households with a female householder and no spouse or partner present. About 26.3% of all households were made up of individuals and 12.0% had someone living alone who was 65 years of age or older.

There were 27,081 housing units, of which 13.0% were vacant. Among occupied housing units, 75.0% were owner-occupied and 25.0% were renter-occupied. The homeowner vacancy rate was 1.4% and the rental vacancy rate was 5.7%.

=== 2010 census ===
The 2010 census indicates St. Joseph County had a 2010 population of 61,295. This decrease of -1,127 people from the 2000 United States census represents a -1.8% population change (decrease) in that decade. In 2010 there were 23,244 households and 16,275 families in the county. The population density was 122.4 per square mile (47.3 per square kilometer). There were 27,778 housing units at an average density of 55.5 per square mile (21.4/km^{2}). The racial and ethnic makeup of the county was 88.0% White, 2.5% Black or African American, 0.4% Native American, 0.7% Asian, 6.6% Hispanic or Latino, 0.1% from other races, and 1.8% from two or more races.

There were 23,244 households, out of which 33.0% had children under the age of 18 living with them, 52.6% were husband and wife families, 11.7% had a female householder with no husband present, 30.0% were non-families, and 24.8% were made up of individuals. The average household size was 2.60 and the average family size was 3.08.

The county population contained 25.9% under age of 18, 8.1% from 18 to 24, 23.8% from 25 to 44, 27.4% from 45 to 64, and 14.9% who were 65 years of age or older. The median age was 39 years. For every 100 females there were 97.9 males. For every 100 females age 18 and over, there were 95.9 males.

The 2010 American Community Survey 3-year estimate indicates the median income for a household in the county was $43,964 and the median income for a family was $52,600. Males had a median income of $30,517 versus $16,388 for females. The per capita income for the county was $19,737. About 1.8% of families and 16.3% of the population were below the poverty line, including 22.3% of those under the age 18 and 12.3% of those age 65 or over.

== Government ==
St. Joseph County has long been reliably Republican. Since 1884, the Republican Party nominee has carried 81% of the elections (29 of 36).

United States presidential election results for St. Joseph County, Michigan
Year	Republican		Democratic		Third party(ies)	
Year	No.	%	No.	%	No.	%
1884	3,261	46.89%	3,554	51.11%	139	2.00%
1888	3,372	48.36%	3,217	46.14%	383	5.49%
1892	2,824	43.93%	2,441	37.97%	1,163	18.09%
1896	3,184	43.76%	3,968	54.54%	124	1.70%
1900	3,178	48.19%	3,283	49.78%	134	2.03%
1904	3,649	59.80%	2,176	35.66%	277	4.54%
1908	3,466	52.93%	2,770	42.30%	312	4.76%
1912	1,224	19.03%	2,388	37.13%	2,820	43.84%
1916	3,132	45.01%	3,567	51.26%	260	3.74%
1920	6,035	66.59%	2,725	30.07%	303	3.34%
1924	6,633	65.43%	2,649	26.13%	855	8.43%
1928	8,781	76.05%	2,698	23.37%	67	0.58%
1932	5,626	43.78%	6,917	53.82%	309	2.40%
1936	7,160	51.85%	6,048	43.80%	601	4.35%
1940	10,025	66.32%	5,045	33.38%	45	0.30%
1944	9,785	69.45%	4,235	30.06%	69	0.49%
1948	8,166	65.66%	3,928	31.59%	342	2.75%
1952	12,191	72.19%	4,509	26.70%	187	1.11%
1956	12,328	74.11%	4,242	25.50%	64	0.38%
1960	12,337	69.13%	5,445	30.51%	65	0.36%
1964	7,307	43.96%	9,284	55.85%	32	0.19%
1968	10,445	59.20%	5,413	30.68%	1,787	10.13%
1972	12,438	69.15%	5,119	28.46%	431	2.40%
1976	11,784	61.07%	7,306	37.86%	205	1.06%
1980	13,631	63.19%	6,318	29.29%	1,621	7.52%
1984	15,405	72.34%	5,795	27.21%	96	0.45%
1988	13,084	64.79%	7,017	34.74%	95	0.47%
1992	9,836	41.03%	7,817	32.61%	6,318	26.36%
1996	9,764	46.96%	8,529	41.02%	2,501	12.03%
2000	12,906	58.60%	8,574	38.93%	544	2.47%
2004	15,340	60.78%	9,648	38.23%	251	0.99%
2008	12,886	50.00%	12,322	47.81%	563	2.18%
2012	12,978	55.36%	10,112	43.13%	355	1.51%
2016	14,884	62.10%	7,526	31.40%	1,557	6.50%
2020	18,127	64.78%	9,262	33.10%	592	2.12%
2024	19,403	66.21%	9,452	32.25%	452	1.54%

United States Senate election results for St. Joseph County, Michigan1
Year	Republican		Democratic		Third party(ies)	
Year	No.	%	No.	%	No.	%
2024	18,545	64.48%	9,195	31.97%	1,022	3.55%

Michigan Gubernatorial election results for St. Joseph County
Year	Republican		Democratic		Third party(ies)	
Year	No.	%	No.	%	No.	%
2022	13,059	59.60%	8,402	38.35%	449	2.05%

The county government operates the jail, operates the major local courts, records deeds, mortgages, and vital records, administers public health regulations, and participates with the state in the provision of social services. The county board of commissioners controls the and has limited authority to make laws or ordinances. In Michigan, most local government functions – police and fire, building and zoning, tax assessment, street maintenance, etc. – are the responsibility of individual cities and townships.

=== Elected officials ===
- 1st District Commissioner: Jared Hoffmaster
- 2nd District Commissioner: Rick Shaffer
- 3rd District Commissioner: Rusty Baker
- 4th District Commissioner: Luis Rosado
- 5th District Commissioner: Dennis Allen
- 6th District Commissioner: Ken Malone
- 7th District Commissioner: Terrance Conklin
- Prosecuting Attorney: Deborah Davis
- Sheriff: Chad Spence
- County Clerk/Register of Deeds: Gina Everson
- County Treasurer: Kathy Humphreys
- Drain Commissioner: Jeffrey Wenzel
- County Surveyor: David Mostrom
- 45th Circuit Court Judge: Paul Stutesman
- 3B District Court Judge: Robert K. Pattison
- 3B District Court Judge: Jeffrey C. Middleton
- Probate Court Judge: Kevin Kane

(Information verified with county website as of February 2025)

== Communities ==
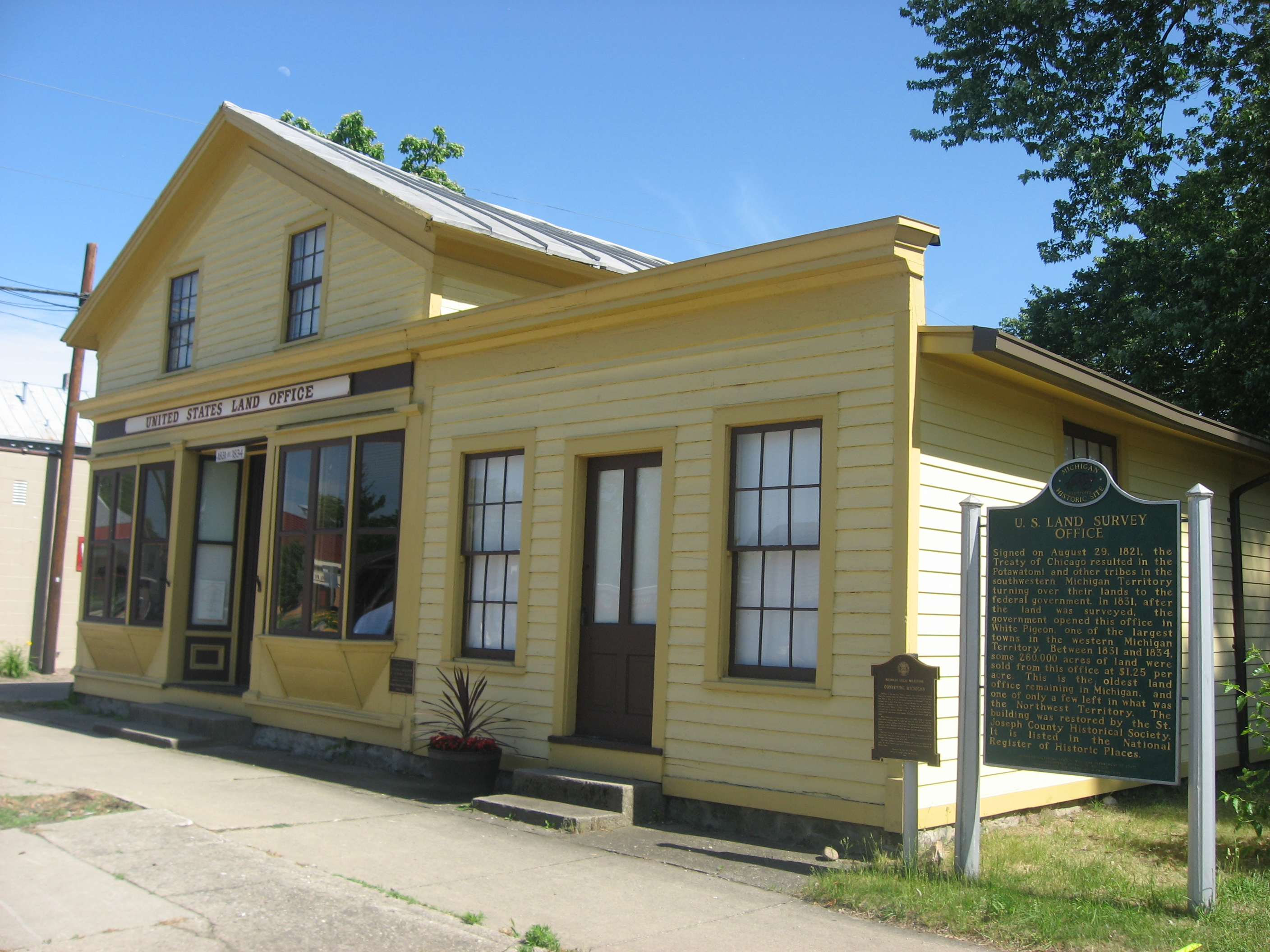
White Pigeon General Land Office

=== Cities ===
- Sturgis
- Three Rivers

=== Villages ===
- Burr Oak
- Centreville (county seat)
- Colon
- Constantine
- Mendon
- White Pigeon

=== Unincorporated communities ===
- Findley
- Leonidas
- Mottville
- Nottawa
- Parkville
- Wasepi

=== Townships ===
- Burr Oak Township
- Colon Township
- Constantine Township
- Fabius Township
- Fawn River Township
- Florence Township
- Flowerfield Township
- Leonidas Township
- Lockport Township
- Mendon Township
- Mottville Township
- Nottawa Township
- Park Township
- Sherman Township
- Sturgis Township
- White Pigeon Township

== See also ==
- List of Michigan State Historic Sites in St. Joseph County
- National Register of Historic Places listings in St. Joseph County, Michigan
