= Massillon Bridge Company =

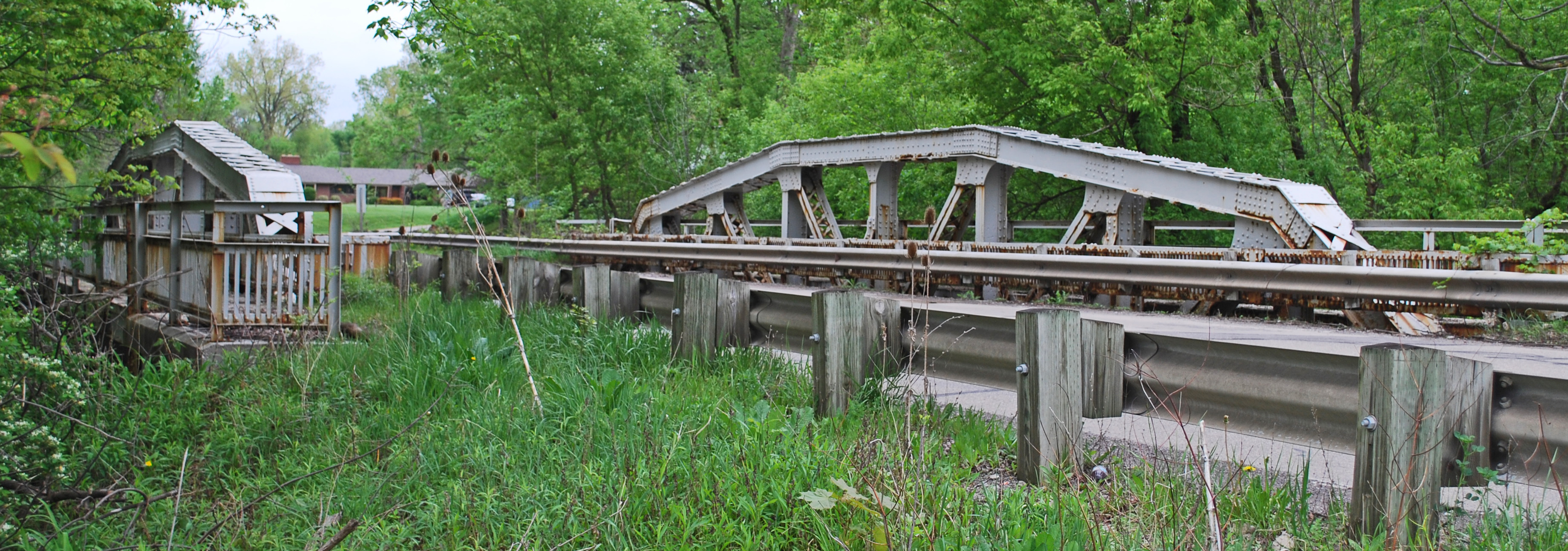
Lilley Road – Lower Rouge River Bridge, in 2010

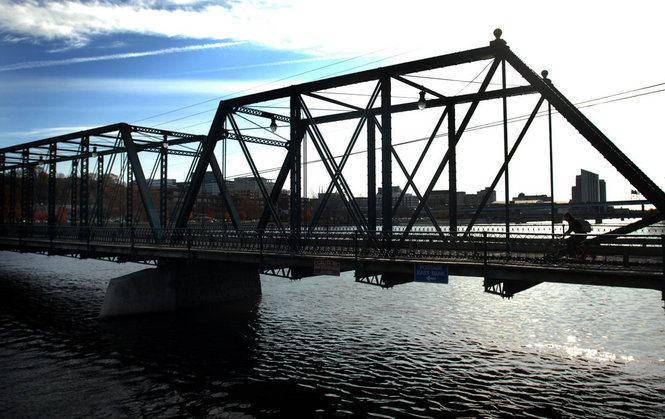
Sixth Street Bridge in Grand Rapids, Michigan

The Massillon Bridge Company, most commonly abbreviated Massillon Bridge Co., was located in Massillon, Ohio and founded by Joseph Davenport in 1869. The company became incorporated in 1887 and remained in operation through the early 1900s. Steel truss bridges built by the Massillon Bridge Co. can be found throughout the midwest.

It designed and/or built the Lilley Road – Lower Rouge River Bridge and other historic bridges.

NRHP-listed bridges that it designed and/or built include (ordered by state):

- Fremont Mill Bridge, Pedestrian path over small pond in Central Park, Anamosa, Iowa (Massillon Iron Bridge Company)
- Washington Mill Bridge, Creek Branch Ln. over Lytle Creek, Bernard, Iowa (Massillon Bridge Co.)
- Lilley Road – Lower Rouge River Bridge, Lilley Rd. over Lower Rouge River, Canton Township, Michigan (Massillon Bridge and Structural Co.)
- Sixth Street Bridge, spans Grand River between Newberry and 6th St., Grand Rapids, Michigan (Massillon Bridge Company)
- Marantette Bridge, Railroad St., Buckner Rd. over St. Joseph River, Mendon, Michigan (Massillon Bridge Co.)
- Station Road Bridge, E of Brecksville at Cuyahoga River, Brecksville, Ohio (Massillon Bridge Co.)
- Dey Road Bridge, 0.35 mi. E of US 24, Defiance, Ohio (Toledo-Massillon Bridge Co.)
- Dean Road Bridge, W of South Amherst at Dean Rd. and Vermilion River, in South Amherst, Ohio and in Birmingham, Ohio (Massillon Bridge Co.)
- Bridge Number 1, Johnson County, Indiana, over Nineveh Creek, 1885
