= Lytle Creek =

Lytle Creek may refer to:

- Lytle Creek, California, a community in San Bernardino County, California
- Lytle Creek (California), a creek in San Bernardino County, California
- Lytle Creek (Iowa), a creek in Iowa crossed by the Washington Mill Bridge
- Lytle Creek (Ohio), a river in Clinton County, Ohio
- Lytle Creek (Oregon), a creek in Crook County, Oregon
