= Marantette Bridge =

Historic bridge in Michigan, United States

- U.S. National Register of Historic Places
- Michigan State Historic Site
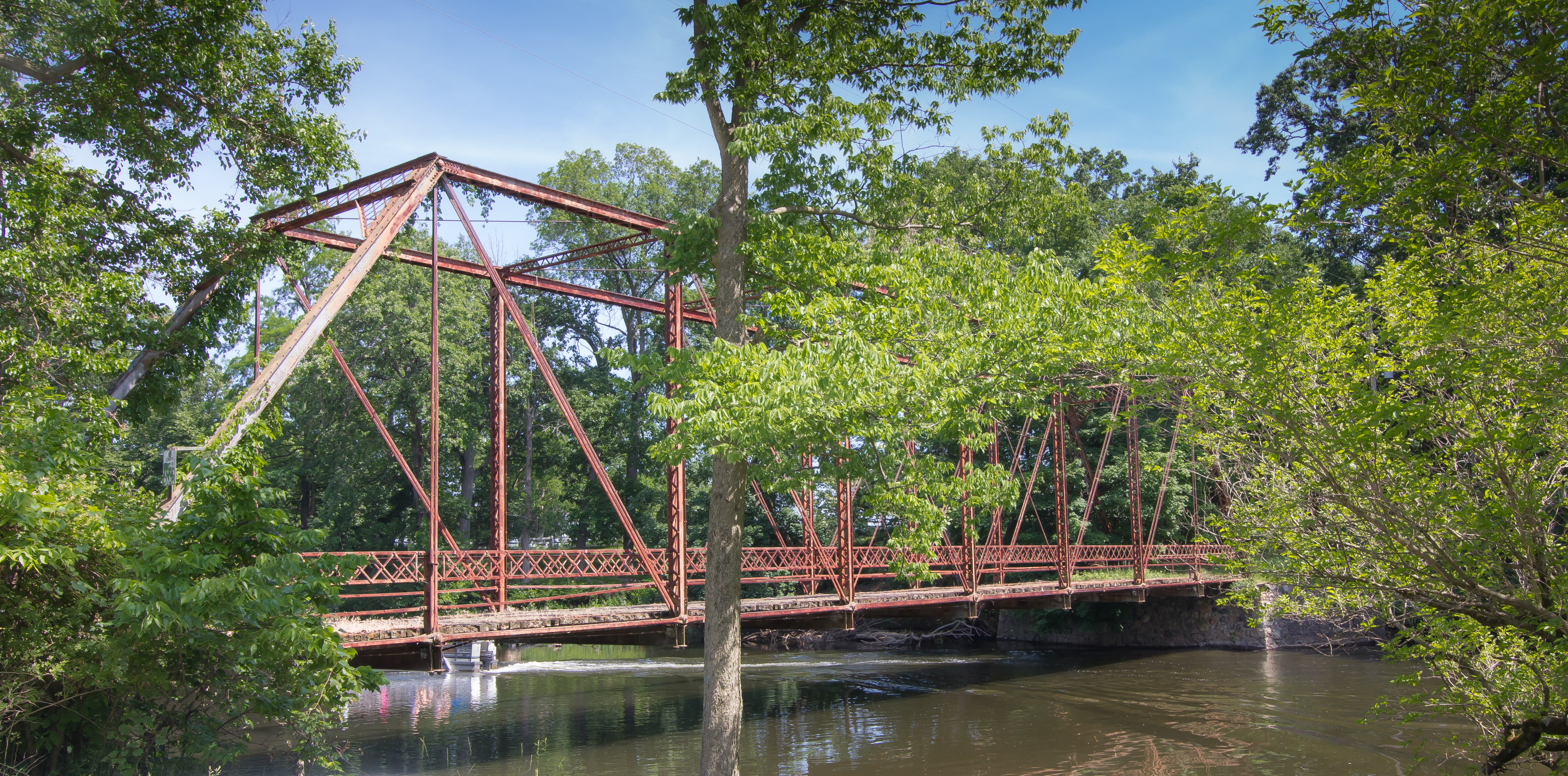

- Location within Michigan Location within the United States
- Interactive map
- Location: Railroad St. over St. Joseph R., Mendon, Michigan
- Coordinates: 41°59′56″N 85°27′30″W
- Area: less than one acre
- Architect: Massillon Bridge Company
- Architectural style: Pratt through truss bridge
- NRHP reference No.: 01000708
- Added to NRHP: June 25, 2001

The Marantette Bridge, also known as the Railroad Street Bridge, is a historic vehicle bridge, now closed to traffic, located at Railroad Street over the St. Joseph River in Mendon, Michigan. It was listed on the National Register of Historic Places in 2001.

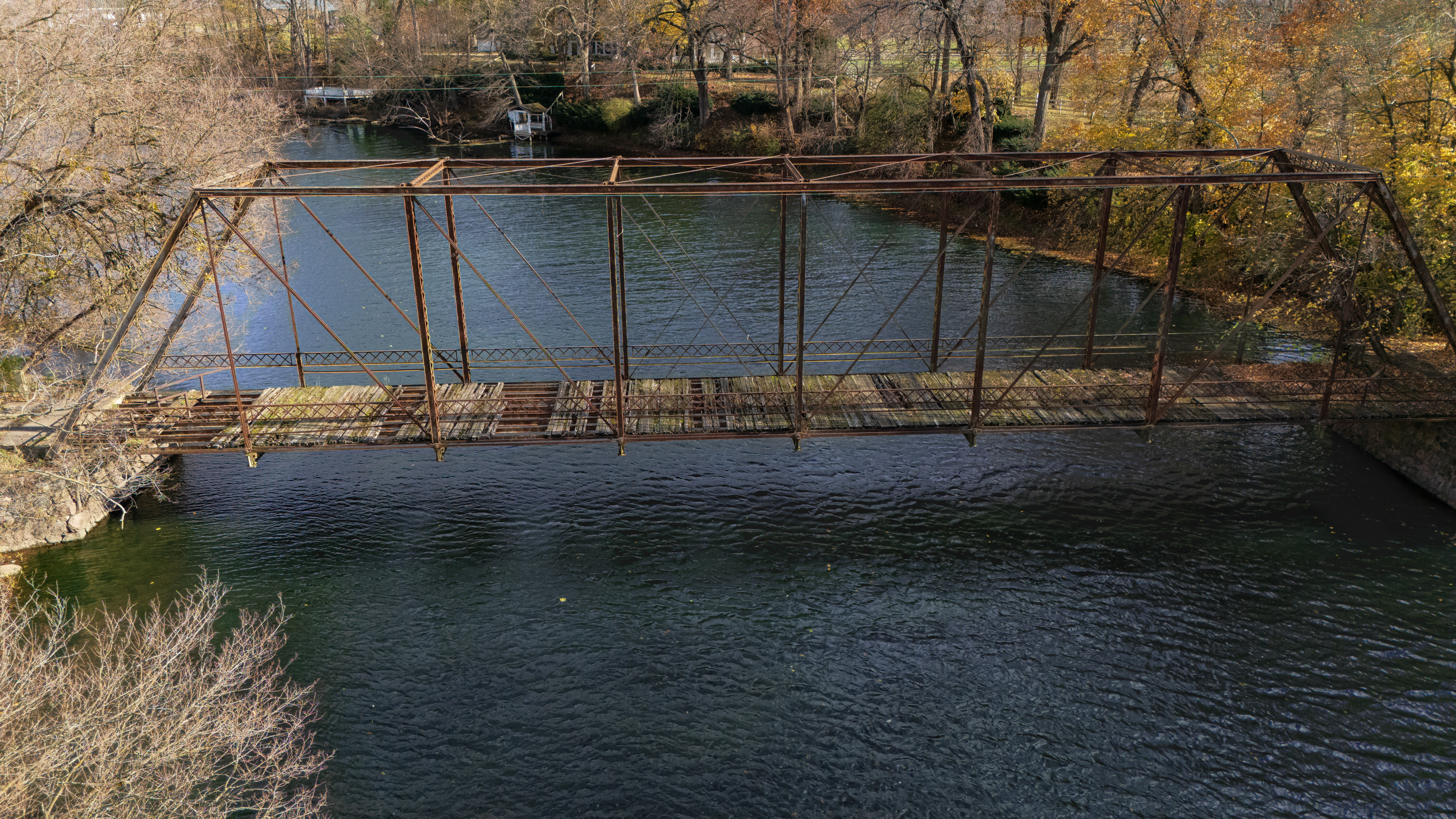

== History ==
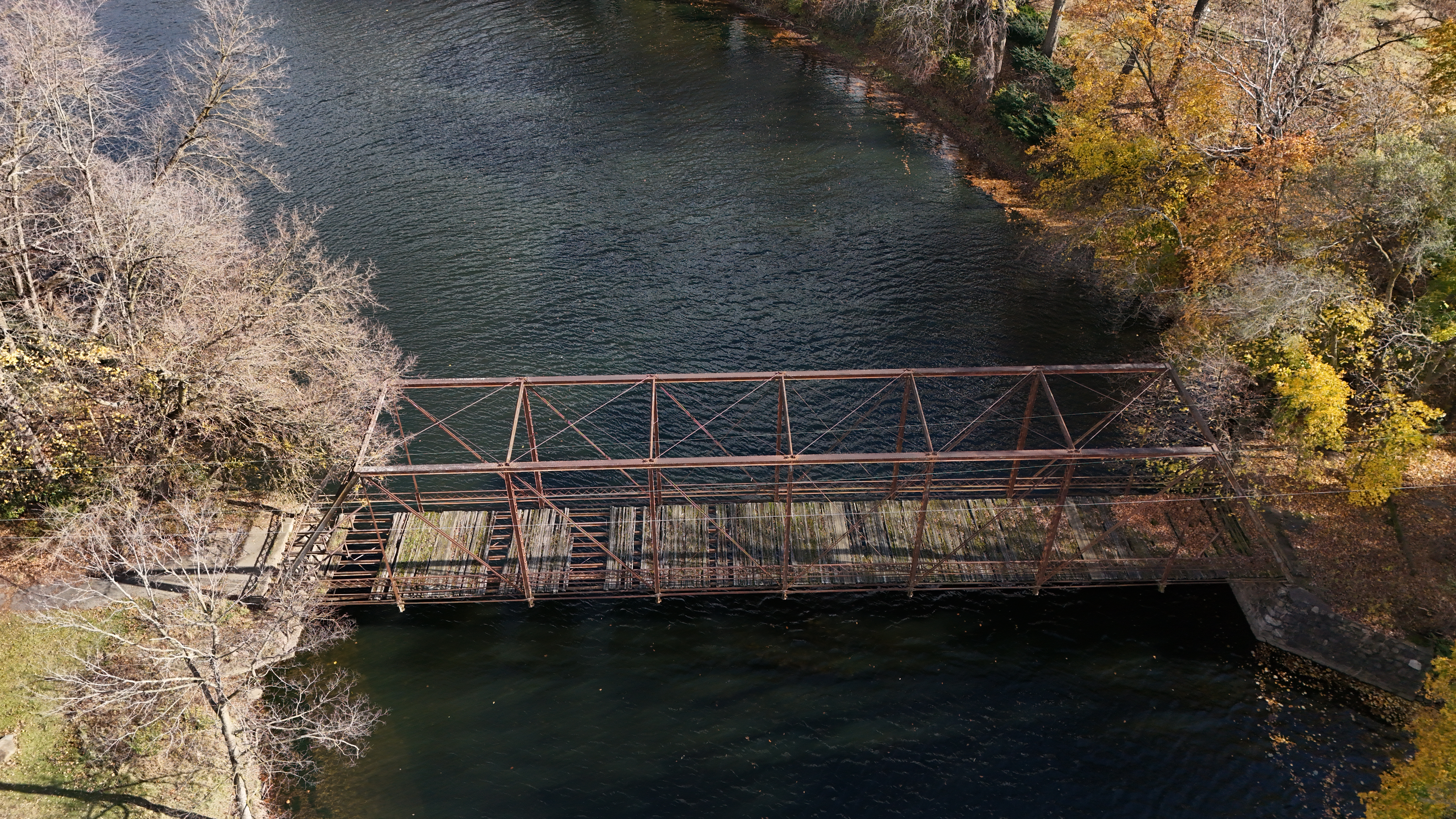

One of the first settlers in Mendon was the Indian trader Patrick Marantette, who arrived in 1833 to manage a trading post located at the site of the Marantette House near this bridge on the south side of the river. The first local bridge over the St. Joseph River was constructed in 1839 about two-thirds of a mile upstream from the Marantette Bridge. In the late 1850s, the Grand Rapids and Indiana Railroad first proposed a line through Mendon, and in anticipation, Patrick Marantette platted the portion of his land north of the river, including the current Railroad Street. There was apparently no bridge serving Railroad Street until 1873.

The 1873 bridge was replaced in 1876. The current bridge was probably built in about 1900. The bridge was constructed by the Massillon Bridge Company located in Massillon, Ohio. The bridge served vehicular traffic until 1984, when it was closed.

== Description ==
The Marantette Bridge is a single span, eight panel steel Pratt through truss bridge with pinned connections. It measures 141 feet in length and 16 feet in width, and is supported with rubble fieldstone abutments. The bridge has a wooden plank deck, now severely deteriorated, set atop steel stringers and supported by transverse girders. The upper structure is constructed of channels connected by cover plates.
