= Sarah Stewart =

Sarah Stewart may refer to:

- Sarah Stewart (author) (born 1939), American children's author
- Sarah Stewart (basketball) (born 1976), Australian wheelchair basketball player
- Sarah Stewart (cancer researcher) (1905–1976), US-Mexican viral oncologist
- Sarah Hicks Stewart (born 1963), American judge
- Sarah Stewart, a.k.a. Cissie Stewart (1911–2008), British Olympic Games medalist in swimming in 1928

== In fiction ==
- Sarah Stewart, character in the American television series Raising Dad (2001–02)

== See also ==
- Sara Stewart (born 1966), Scottish actress
- Sarah T. Stewart-Mukhopadhyay, planetary geoscientist
