= Judith St. George =

American author

Judith Saint George (February 26, 1931 – June 10, 2015) was an American author, most famous for writing So You Want to Be President?. She has written more than 40 books, most being historical fiction. Ms. St. George was born in Westfield, NJ and is a graduate of Smith College. She was a resident of Connecticut at the time of her death on June 10, 2015.

== Bibliography ==
- Turncoat Winter, Rebel Spring (1970) ISBN 9780801955532
- The Girl with Spunk (1975) ISBN 9780399204739
- Mystery Isle (1976, 2007) ISBN 9780142408414
- By George, Bloomers! (1976, 1989) ISBN 9781558701359
- The Secret In The Old House (1976) ISBN 9780590327855
- The Shadow of the Shaman (1977) ISBN 9780399205927
- The Shad Are Running (1977) ISBN 9780399205569, illustrated by Richard Cuffari
- The Halloween Pumpkin Smasher (1978) ISBN 9780399206177, illustrated by Margot Tomes
- The Halo Wind (1978) ISBN 9780399206511
- Mystery at St. Martin's (1979) ISBN 9780399207020
- The Amazing Voyage of the New Orleans (1980) ISBN 9780399206979
- Call Me Margo (1981) ISBN 9780399207907
- The Mysterious Girl in the Garden (1981) ISBN 9780399208225, illustrated by Margot Tomes
- The Brooklyn Bridge: They Said it Couldn't Be Built (1982, 1993) ISBN 9780153046131
- In the Shadow of the Bear (1983) ISBN 9780399210150
- Do You See What I See (1983) ISBN 9780451125767
- Mt. Rushmore Story (1985) ISBN 9780399211171
- What's Happening to My Junior Year? (1987) ISBN 9780380703760
- Who's Scared Not Me (1987) ISBN 9780399214813
- Panama Canal (1989) ISBN 9780399216374
- The White House (1990) ISBN 9780399221866
- Mason and Dixon's Line of Fire (1991) ISBN 9780399222405
- Dear Dr. Bell...Your Friend, Helen Keller (1993) ISBN 9780688128142
- Crazy Horse (1994) ISBN 9780399226670
- To See with the Heart (1996) ISBN 9780399229305
- Sacagawea (1997) ISBN 9780399231612
- Betsy Ross: Patriot of Philadelphia (1997) ISBN 9780805054392, illustrated by Sasha Meret
- So You Want to Be President? (2000) ISBN 9780399243172, illustrated by David Small
- So You Want to Be an Inventor? (2002) ISBN 9780399235931, illustrated by David Small
- You're on Your Way, Teddy Roosevelt (2004) ISBN 9780399238888, illustrated by Matt Faulkner
- The Journey of the One and Only Declaration of Independence (2005) ISBN 9780399237386, illustrated by Will Hillenbrand
- Haunted (2005) ISBN 9780142404355
- In the Line of Fire: Presidents' Lives at Stake (2005) ISBN 9780823414284
- John and Abigail Adams: An American Love Story (2005) ISBN 9780823415717
- Take the Lead, George Washington (2005) ISBN 9780399238871, illustrated by Daniel Powers
- So You Want to Be an Explorer? (2005) ISBN 9780399238680, illustrated by David Small
- The Ghost, the White House and Me (2007) ISBN 9780823420452
- Make Your Mark, Franklin Roosevelt (2007) ISBN 9780399241758, illustrated by Britt Spencer
- Stand Tall, Abe Lincoln (2008) ISBN 9780399241741, illustrated by Matt Faulkner
- Zarafa: The Giraffe Who Walked to the King (2009) ISBN 9780399250491, illustrated by Britt Spencer
- The Duel: The Parallel Lives of Alexander Hamilton and Aaron Burr (2009) ISBN 9780670011247
- What Was the Lewis and Clark Expedition? (2014) ISBN 9780448479019, illustrated by Tim Foley

== Critical response ==
Mystery at St. Martin's (1979) was a Dorothy Canfield Fisher Children's Book Award Nominee (1981).

The Brooklyn Bridge: They Said it Couldn't Be Built (1982, 1993) was a National Book Award Finalist for Children's Books, Nonfiction (1983).

Betsy Ross: Patriot of Philadelphia (1997) received the Fraunces Tavern Museum Book Award for Juvenile Literature (1998).

So You Want to Be President? (2000) received the following accolades:

- Caldecott Medal (2001)
- Pennsylvania Young Readers' Choice Award for Grades 3-6 (2002)
- Dorothy Canfield Fisher Children's Book Award Nominee (2002)
