= One Cool Friend =

2012 children's book by Toni Buzzeo

- Author: Toni Buzzeo and David Small
- Language: English
- Genre: Children's literature
- Published: 2012
- Publisher: Dial Books
- Publication place: United States
- Media type: Print (hardback)
- Pages: 32
- ISBN: 978-0803734135

One Cool Friend is a 2012 picture book written by Toni Buzzeo and illustrated by David Small. In 2013, the book won a Maine Literary Award and a Caldecott Honor.

== Plot ==
On a visit to the aquarium with his father, a shy and "very proper" boy named Elliot decides to secretly place a real penguin in his backpack after his father, who was actually referring to a stuffed animal, seemingly approves of Elliot taking one home. Elliot names it "Magellan" (after the Magellanic penguin). Elliot attempts to hide Magellan from his father, who remains oblivious even as Elliot studies penguin habitats at the library, turns down the thermostat, installs an ice rink in his bedroom, builds a nest in the freezer, and hauls bags of ice cubes and Goldfish crackers home for the penguin. Elliot begins to wear a tuxedo and exhibit tall straight posture to match Magellan; Elliot's father is a sea turtle researcher who wears green pajamas and has hunched posture like the creatures' curved shells. At the end, Elliot's father finds Magellan in the bathtub.

== Reception and history ==
One Cool Friend's illustrations were created with colored pencil, ink, and water color, and have been described as having a retro feel. A review in The New York Times praised them for containing "plenty of playful details" and conveying the "scale and urgency of a child’s perspective" as they lead up to a twist on the last page.

Toni Buzzeo was inspired to write the story by a 2005 urban legend that claimed a child took home a penguin from the New England Aquarium in Boston, Massachusetts. She spent about three years writing the story.
