= Mendon, Michigan =

- Village
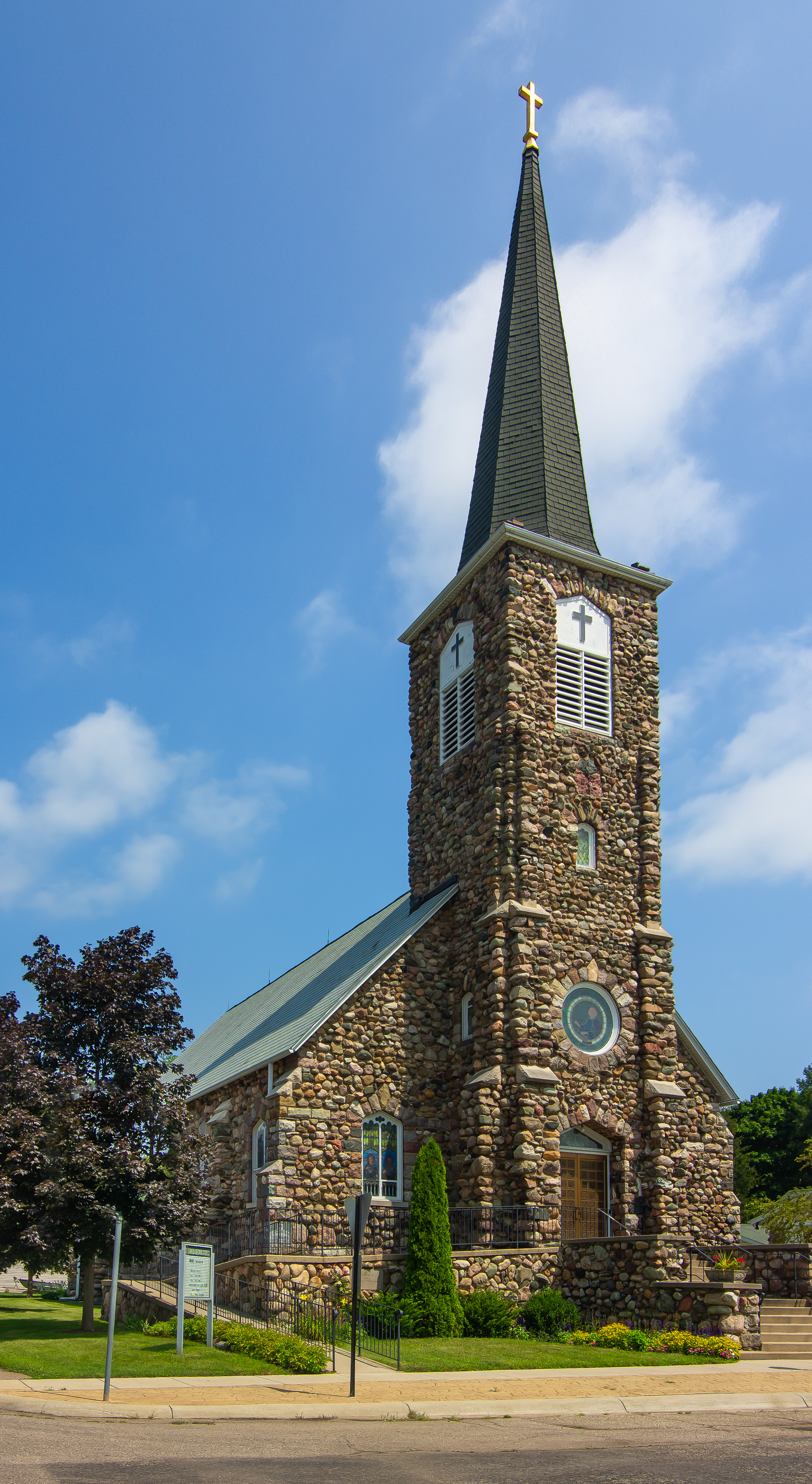
- St. Edward Catholic Church

- Location of Mendon, Michigan
- Coordinates: 42°0′26″N 85°27′9″W
- Country: United States
- State: Michigan
- County: St. Joseph
- Incorporated (village): March 31, 1875

Area
  - Total: 0.99 sq mi (2.56 km^{2})
  - Land: 0.98 sq mi (2.53 km^{2})
  - Water: 0.0077 sq mi (0.02 km^{2})
- Elevation: 843 ft (257 m)

Population (2020)
  - Total: 881
  - Density: 900.6/sq mi (347.73/km^{2})
- Time zone: UTC-5 (Eastern (EST))
  - Summer (DST): UTC-4 (EDT)
- Postal code: 49072
- Area code: 269
- FIPS code: 26-52980
- GNIS feature ID: 1624728
- Website: Village website

Mendon is a village in St. Joseph County in the U.S. state of Michigan. The village is located within Mendon Township.

As of 2023, the estimated population is 868. The population was 870 at the 2010 census.

== Geography ==
According to the United States Census Bureau, the village has a total area of 1.02 square miles (2.64 km^{2}), of which 1.01 square miles (2.62 km^{2}) is land and 0.01 square miles (0.03 km^{2}) is water.

== History ==
This area along the St. Joseph River was settled in the colonial period by French pioneers from Quebec and France. They traded with the Potawatomi and other Algonquian-speaking tribes of the area.

After United States acquisition of this territory following the American Revolution, settlers began to enter from eastern states in the early 19th century. The original county of St. Joseph was divided by Americans into townships. Mendon township was settled in 1831. The village of Mendon was platted in 1845.

On April 11, 1905, city activists who supported a public library received a matching construction grant from the Carnegie Foundation. They built the Mendon Township Library, which is one of the many Carnegie Libraries still in operation to this day.

Mendon is the home of two landmarks that are listed on the National Register of Historic Places. The Marantette House was added to the list in 1973; it was built by an ethnic French man from Detroit who had traded with the Potawatomi at their settlement of Nottawaseepe. The Marantette Bridge, built at the end of the 19th century, was listed in 2001.

== Demographics ==
Historical population
Census	Pop.	Note	%±
1860	409		—
1870	660		61.4%
1880	854		29.4%
1890	808		−5.4%
1900	777		−3.8%
1910	768		−1.2%
1920	625		−18.6%
1930	692		10.7%
1940	667		−3.6%
1950	844		26.5%
1960	867		2.7%
1970	949		9.5%
1980	951		0.2%
1990	920		−3.3%
2000	917		−0.3%
2010	870		−5.1%
2020	881		1.3%
U.S. Decennial Census

=== 2020 census ===
As of the census of 2020, there were 881 people, 321 households, and 243 families residing in the village. The population density was 864.2 inhabitants per square mile (333.67/km squared).

=== 2010 census ===
As of the census of 2010, there were 870 people, 319 households, and 241 families residing in the village. The population density was 861.4 inhabitants per square mile (332.6/km^{2}). There were 349 housing units at an average density of 345.5 per square mile (133.4/km^{2}). The racial makeup of the village was 96.9% White, 0.8% African American, 0.3% Native American, 0.3% Asian, 0.1% from other races, and 1.5% from two or more races. Hispanic or Latino of any race were 2.2% of the population.

There were 319 households, of which 39.5% had children under the age of 18 living with them, 56.4% were married couples living together, 12.5% had a female householder with no husband present, 6.6% had a male householder with no wife present, and 24.5% were non-families. 20.4% of all households were made up of individuals, and 10.3% had someone living alone who was 65 years of age or older. The average household size was 2.73 and the average family size was 3.08.

The median age in the village was 37.1 years. 28.7% of residents were under the age of 18; 7.6% were between the ages of 18 and 24; 24.2% were from 25 to 44; 28.4% were from 45 to 64; and 10.9% were 65 years of age or older. The gender makeup of the village was 49.4% male and 50.6% female.

=== 2000 census ===
According to the census of 2000, there were 917 people, 334 households, and 245 families residing in the village. The population density was 1,217.1 inhabitants per square mile (469.9/km^{2}). There were 364 housing units at an average density of 483.1 per square mile (186.5/km^{2}). The racial makeup of the village was 96.84% White, 0.65% African American, 0.44% Native American, 0.55% Pacific Islander, 0.44% from other races, and 1.09% from two or more races. Hispanic or Latino of any race were 2.07% of the population.

There were 334 households, out of which 38.9% had children under the age of 18 living with them, 57.8% were married couples living together, 11.7% had a female householder with no husband present, and 26.6% were non-families. 21.6% of all households were made up of individuals, and 8.7% had someone living alone who was 65 years of age or older. The average household size was 2.75 and the average family size was 3.23.

In the village, the population was spread out, with 31.4% under the age of 18, 7.7% from 18 to 24, 32.3% from 25 to 44, 17.7% from 45 to 64, and 10.9% who were 65 years of age or older. The median age was 33 years. For every 100 females, there were 97.6 males. For every 100 females age 18 and over, there were 91.2 males.

The median income for a household in the village was $40,000, and the median income for a family was $41,625. Males had a median income of $34,479 versus $27,692 for females. The per capita income for the village was $17,266. About 3.9% of families and 5.9% of the population were below the poverty line, including 9.3% of those under age 18 and 4.3% of those age 65 or over.

== Culture ==
=== Mendon Riverfest ===
Each year, the village celebrates the Mendon Riverfest at Reed River Park on the banks of the St. Joseph River. This festival began in 1987 at the historic Wakeman House, but relocated around 1989, when the size of the festival became too large for the venue. The Mendon Riverfest takes place annually on the third weekend in August, from Thursday through Saturday. Some of the signature activities include the Lip Sync Contest, the Canoe Swamp, Casino Night, and the Toy Boat Race. On Saturday night a fireworks display is set off over the banks of the St. Joseph River.

=== Mendon Kiwanis Showboat ===
Beginning as a Minstrel Show in 1956, The Mendon Kiwanis Showboat has become a cultural staple. It focuses on local music, talent, and comedy.

It is also the Largest fundraiser for the local Mendon Kiwanis Club. In 2017 it raised Nearly $10,000 USD, much of which stayed local and went to funding food programs and scholarships for the kids in the town of Mendon.

On the first full Weekend of every November,† at the Mendon Elementary Auditorium, This Fundraiser takes place. Each Year it brings together a Chorus of local talent to perform in a variety show. For the first fifty years of its existence the show's format and theme remained largely unchanged. It Used to be Based on turn of the century Mississippi River Steam Boat shows and the musical 'Showboat' By Oscar Hammerstein II.

== Education ==
Mendon Junior/Senior High School is one of the top academic schools in southwestern Michigan. Mendon Junior/Senior High School scored better in writing on the spring 2009 Michigan Merit Exam than any other school in the region. They finished second in reading and third in English language arts.

Mendon Junior/Senior High School has had an outstanding football program. In 1999 it won its sixth state championship in Division 8. Since then, it has won seven more state championships. In 2011 it defeated Fowler High School (Michigan) with a score of 33–0 in the Michigan High School Athletic Association (MHSAA) Division 8 Championship game.

== Notable people ==
- Nathan Bombrys, professional rugby managing director
- Pete Estes, fifteenth president of General Motors
- David Small, author and illustrator
- Sarah Stewart, author
- George L. Yaple, U.S. representative from Michigan
