= Dean Road Bridge =

- U.S. National Register of Historic Places
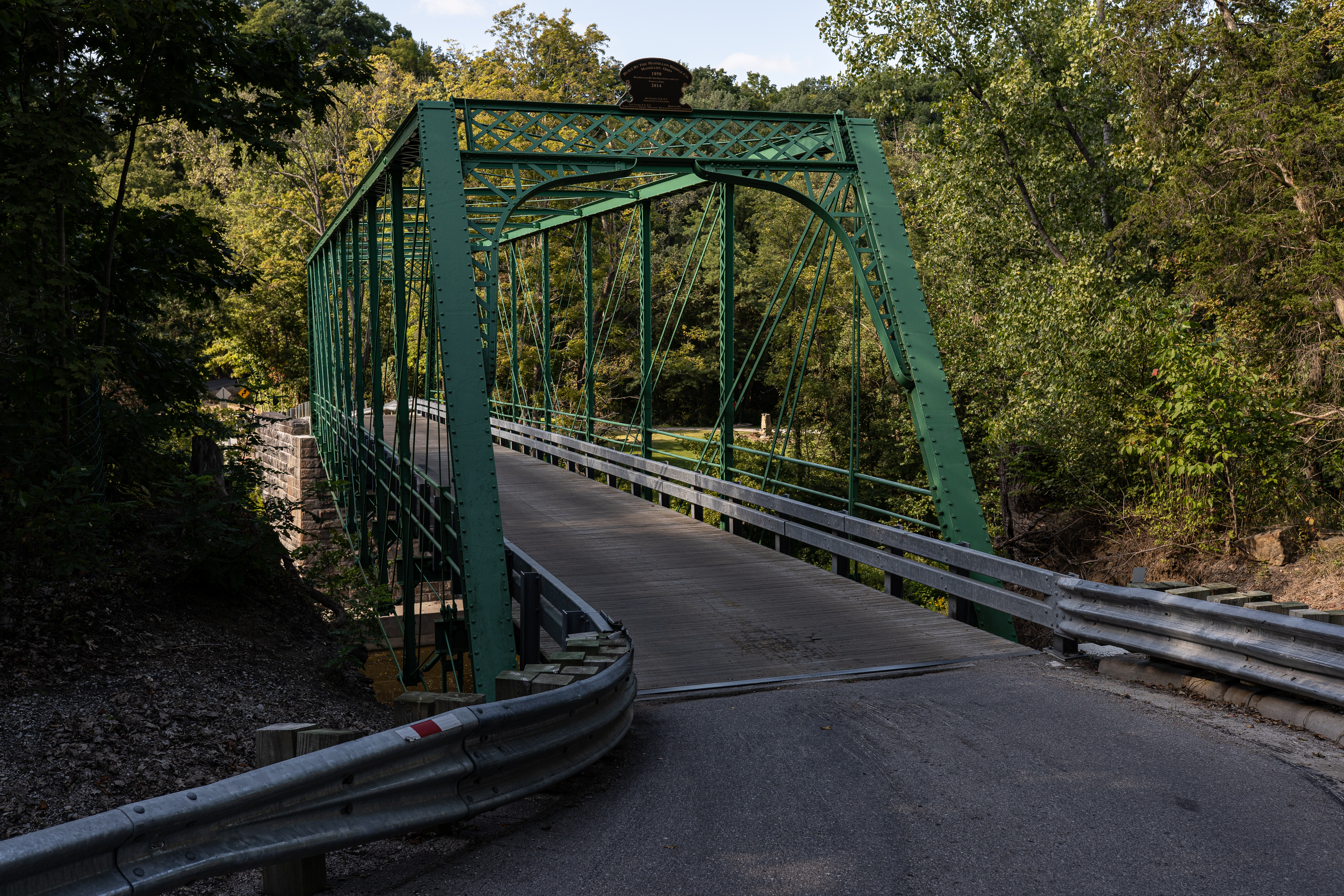
- The bridge in 2019
- Location: West of South Amherst, Ohio at Dean Rd. and the Vermilion River, in Florence Township
- Coordinates: 41°20′56″N 82°20′41″W
- Area: less than one acre
- Built: 1898
- Built by: Massillon Bridge Co.
- Architectural style: Pratt truss
- NRHP reference No.: 78002119
- Added to NRHP: November 28, 1978

The Dean Road Bridge is a Pratt truss bridge in northern Ohio built in 1898. It spans the Vermillion River between Erie and Lorain counties. The bridge was listed on the National Register of Historic Places in 1978.

It was built by the Massillon Bridge Company and was deemed to be "an excellent example of the turn-of-the-century metal truss bridges that were constructed throughout this region."
