= David Small =

American writer and illustrator (born 1945)

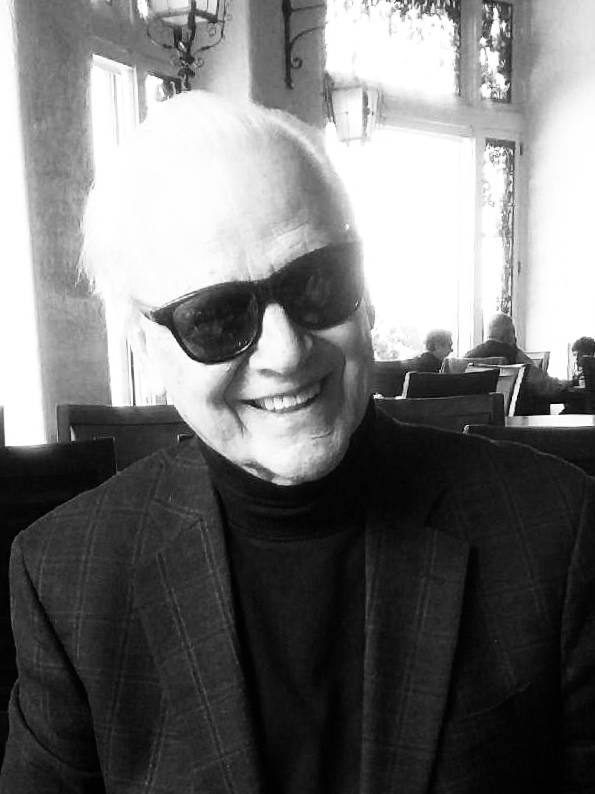
- Born: February 12, 1945 (age 81); Detroit
- Education: Cass Technical High School; Wayne State University; Yale University
- Occupations: Illustrator, writer
- Spouse: Sarah Stewart (author)
- Writing career
- Genre: Children's literature
- Notable works: The Gardener (1998); Stitches (2009)
- Website: davidsmallbooks.com

David Small (born February 12, 1945) is an American writer and illustrator known for children's picture books. He won the Caldecott Medal in 2001 for So You Want to Be President?, and received two Caldecott Honors for The Gardener (1997) and One Cool Friend (2012). In 2009, he published the graphic memoir Stitches.

== Biography ==
David Small was born in Detroit, Michigan, the second son of Edward Pierce Small, Jr. and Helen "Elizabeth" née Murphy Small. He began drawing at the age of two years, and health problems that kept him home for much of his childhood, also led to his developing his drawing skills. Small has described his childhood home as abusive. He attended Cass Technical High School and wrote plays throughout his teenage years.

At age 21, he switched to art. He earned a bachelor of fine arts degree at Wayne State University and a master of fine arts degree at Yale University. Small taught art for many years on the college level, ran a film series, and made satirical sketches for campus newspapers. His first book, Eulalie and the Hopping Head, which he wrote and illustrated, was published in 1981.

Small earned a 1997 Caldecott Honor and The Christopher Medal for The Gardener, with Sarah Stewart, his wife. She also received the 2007 Michigan Author Award. In 2001, Small won the Caldecott Medal for So You Want to Be President?, combining political cartooning with children's book illustration. He received a second Caldecott Honor in 2013 for illustrating Toni Buzzeo's One Cool Friend. Small's drawings have appeared in the New Yorker and the New York Times. On July 15, 2014, he was announced as a finalist for the 2015 NSK Neustadt Prize for Children's Literature.

In addition to picture books, Small published a graphic memoir in September 2009 called Stitches about his journey from sickly child and young cancer patient to a troubled teen who ran away from home at sixteen to become an artist. Upon its release, the book topped the New York Times Graphic Books Best Seller list. It was named one of the ten best books of 2009 by Publishers Weekly and Amazon.com and was a finalist for the 2009 National Book Award for Young People's Literature. Stitches has been translated into seven languages and published in nine countries.

In 2020, Western Michigan University Libraries announced it would acquire David Small and Sarah Stewart's archives, including their original artwork, sketchbooks, journals, published and unpublished writings.

David and Sarah Stewart live in an historic manor house in Mendon, Michigan.

== Works ==
=== As writer and illustrator ===
- Eulalie and the Hopping Head (Macmillan, 1982) – named a School Library Journal Best Book of the Year
- Imogene's Antlers (Crown Publishers, 1985)
- Paper John (Farrar, Straus and Giroux [FSG], 1987)
- Ruby Mae Has Something to Say (Crown, 1992)
- Hoover's Bride (Knopf Books for Young Readers, 1995)
- Fenwick's Suit (FSG, 1996)
- George Washington's Cows (FSG, 1997)
- Stitches (W.W. Norton, 2009)
- Home After Dark (Liveright Publishing Corporation, 2018)
- "The Werewolf at Dusk and Other Stories" (Liveright Publishing Corporation, 2024)

=== As illustrator with Sarah Stewart ===
Small has illustrated several books written by Sarah Stewart and published by Farrar, Straus and Giroux (FSG).

- The Money Tree (FSG, 1994)
- The Library (FSG, 1995)
- The Gardener (FSG, 1997) – Caldecott Honor Book
- The Journey (FSG, 2001)
- The Friend (FSG, 2004)
- The Quiet Place (FSG, 2012)
- This Book Of Mine (FSG, 2019)

=== As illustrator with other writers ===
- Gulliver's Travels, Jonathan Swift (William Morrow & Co., 1983)
- The Dragon Who Lived Downstairs, Burr Tillstrom (William Morrow & Co., 1984)
- Company's Coming, written by Arthur Yorinks (Knopf, 1988)
- A Surfeit of Similes, Norton Juster (William Morrow & Co., 1989)
- Petey's Bedtime Story, Beverly Cleary (HarperCollins, 1993)
- The Christmas Crocodile, Bonnie Becker (Simon & Schuster, 1998)
- Huckabuck Family: And How They Raised Popcorn in Nebraska and Quit and Came Back, Carl Sandburg, (FSG, 1999) – one of the 1923 Rootabaga Stories, OCLC 38856059
- So You Want to Be President?, Judith St. George (Penguin Philomel, 2000) – winner of the 2001 Caldecott Medal
- Company's Going, Arthur Yorinks (Hyperion Books for Children, 2001)
- The Mouse and His Child, Russell Hoban (Arthur A. Levine Books, 2001)
- So You Want to Be an Inventor?, Judith St. George (Philomel, 2002)
- The Essential Worldwide Monster Guide, Linda Ashman (Simon & Schuster, 2003)
- So You Want to Be an Explorer?, Judith St. George (Philomel, 2005)
- My Senator and Me: A Dog's Eye View of Washington, D.C., Ted Kennedy (Scholastic Books, 2006)
- Once Upon a Banana, Jennifer Armstrong (Simon & Schuster, 2006)
- When Dinosaurs Came with Everything, Elise Broach (Atheneum Books for Young Readers, 2007)
- That Book Woman, Heather Henson (Atheneum, 2008)
- The Underneath, Kathi Appelt (Atheneum, 2008)
- One Cool Friend, Toni Buzzeo (Dial Books for Young Readers, 2012) – Caldecott Honor Book
- Long Road to the Circus, Betsy Bird (Knopf Books for Young Readers, 2021)
- Cat's Very Good Day, Kristen Tracy (G. P. Putnam's Sons, 2023)
