= So You Want to Be President? =

2000 picture book by Judith St. George

- So You Want to Be President?
- Author: Judith St. George
- Illustrator: David Small
- Genre: Children's picture book
- Publisher: Philomel Books
- Publication date: 2000
- Publication place: United States
- Media type: Print
- Pages: 52
- ISBN: 0-399-23407-1
- OCLC: 39763889
- Dewey Decimal: 973/.099 21
- LC Class: E176.1 .S699 2000

So You Want to Be President? is a children's picture book written by Judith St. George and illustrated by David Small. Published in 2000, the book features a comprehensive guide to the Presidents of the United States. It includes information about the education, family, and prior occupations of Presidents, as well as facts about their Vice Presidents. David Small won the 2001 Caldecott Medal for his illustrations. In 2002, the animated adaptation, narrated by Stockard Channing, with music by Scotty Huff and Robert Reynolds, was released. The following year, it won the Carnegie Medal for Excellence in Children's Video.

== Description ==
The book, written by St. George and illustrated by Small, contains 52 pages; each page detailing jobs, benefits, lifestyles, and the personalities of 42 American presidents. Each president is illustrated as a caricature and is shown taking part in different comical scenarios. The book has been published in braille, illustrated text, and audiobook.

== Synopsis ==
The book details the lives, history, and personalities about past Presidents of the United States, followed by information about the different backgrounds some Presidents have shared. Each page describes facts about some Presidents including military backgrounds, former job positions, other offices held, hobbies, lifestyles, and popularity. It also mentions some of the more notable accomplishments of former Presidents including The Louisiana Purchase, soup kitchens, job creations, and the creation of the Peace Corps. The book ends with a change of tone and an illustration of a silhouette of an unidentified president who is taking the Oath of office, complemented by a crowd of hands waving miniature American Flags.

== Critical reception ==
So You Want to Be President? was highly praised by critics. Publishers Weekly called it "clever" and "engrossing". Kirkus Reviews said that St. George "offers a pleasingly diverse slate of facts and figures". The New York Times praised it for being "easy enough to read" for younger children and claims "its rich anecdotes provoke questions, answers, definitions, recollections and more anecdotes." Goodreads also praised Small's illustrations as "hilarious".

== Awards ==
- Caldecott Medal (2001)

Awards
Preceded by Joseph Had a Little Overcoat	Caldecott Medal recipient 2001	Succeeded by The Three Pigs
