= Station Road Bridge =

- U.S. National Register of Historic Places
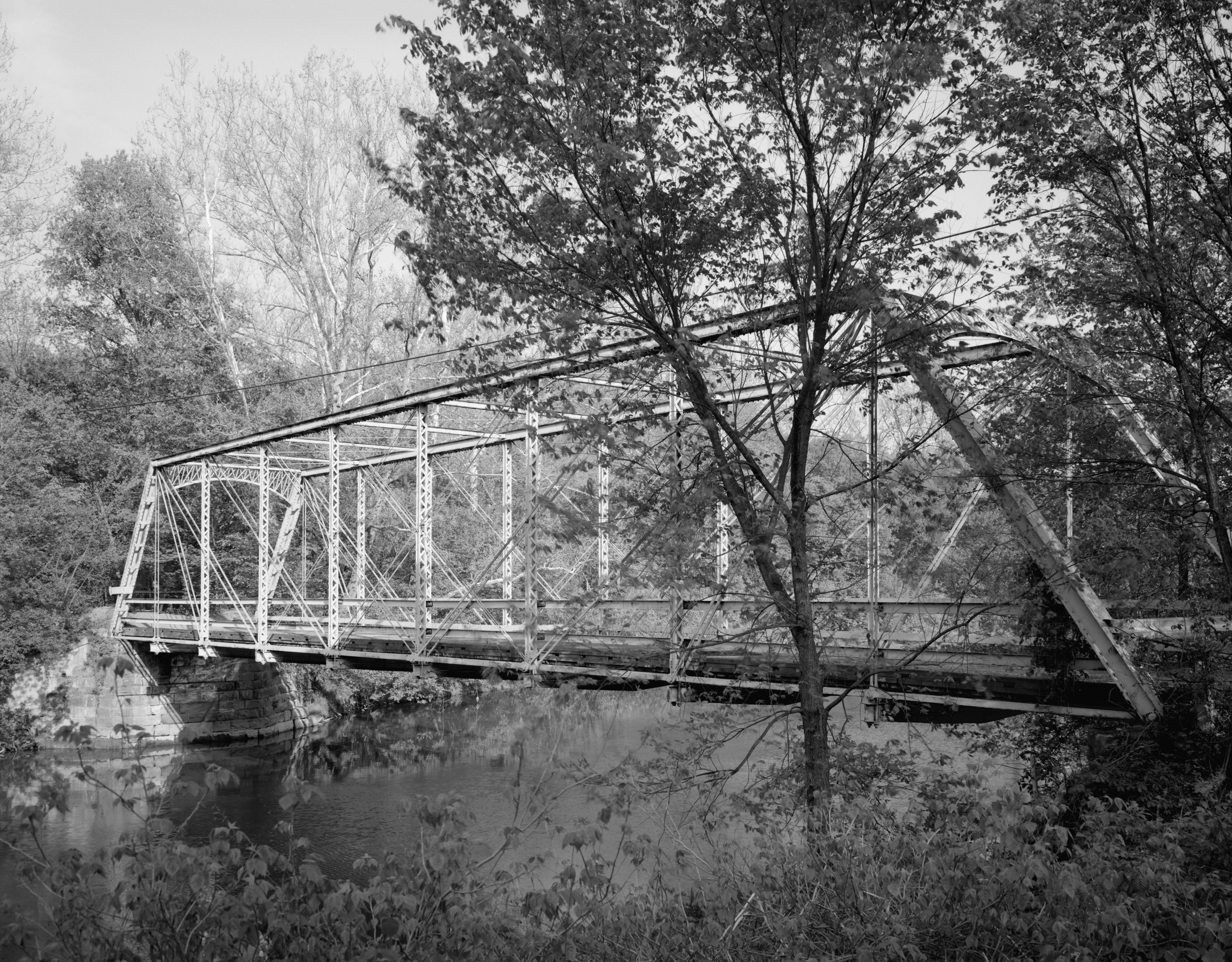
- HAER photo

- Location within Ohio
- Location: East of Brecksville, Ohio at the Cuyahoga River
- Coordinates: 41°19′10″N 81°35′15″W
- Area: less than one acre
- Built: 1882
- Built by: Massillon Bridge Co.
- Architectural style: Pratt Whipple Truss
- NRHP reference No.: 79000312
- Added to NRHP: March 7, 1979

The Station Road Bridge, near Brecksville, Ohio, was built in 1882. It spans the Cuyahoga River between Cuyahoga County and Summit County, Ohio. It was listed on the National Register of Historic Places in 1979.

The bridge was documented in the Historic American Engineering Record in 1985.

It was built by the Massillon Bridge Company. It is a Pratt Whipple truss bridge, described as "a metal through truss of the double-intersection Pratt (Whipple) type. The essential features of the type are inclined end posts and diagonal (tension) members that extend across two panels. The bridge features an ornamental plate at the top chord at each approach which reads "Massillon Bridge Company / 82 / Builders, Massillon, Ohio".

The bridge is 128.6 feet (39.2 m) long with a single span covering 124 feet (38 m). It is 18.7 feet (5.7 m) wide carrying a roadway 14.95 feet (4.56 m) wide.

== See also ==
- List of bridges documented by the Historic American Engineering Record in Ohio
