= The Gardener (children's book) =

American children's picture book, 1997

- Author: Sarah Stewart
- Language: English
- Genre: Children's literature
- Publisher: Farrar, Straus and Giroux
- Publication date: 30 August 1997
- Publication place: United States
- Media type: Picture book (hardcover)
- Pages: 40 pp
- ISBN: 978-0-374-32517-6

The Gardener is an American children's picture book by American children's book author Sarah Stewart, illustrated by her husband, David Small and designed by art director Lilian Rosenstreich. The story, about a young girl and her rooftop garden in the city, is set in the Depression era and told through an epistolary style. It was published in 1997 by Farrar, Straus and Giroux.

== Awards and honors ==
- School Library Journal’s Top 100 Picture Books (2012)
- Caldecott Honor Book (1998)
- New York Times Book Review Notable Children's Book of the Year (1997)
