= Stitches (book) =

Graphic memoir by David Small

Stitches: A Memoir
- Cover to the English-language hardcover edition of Stitches
- Author: David Small
- Illustrator: David Small
- Cover artist: David Small
- Language: English
- Genre: Graphic novel, memoir
- Publisher: W. W. Norton
- Publication date: September 8, 2009
- Publication place: U.S.A.
- Pages: 336 pp.
- ISBN: 978-0393068573
- OCLC: 317473464

Stitches: A Memoir is a graphic memoir written and illustrated by David Small.

== Synopsis ==
The book is set in Detroit, Michigan, where Small spent his childhood. Small's family—on the surface a model of 1950s-style middle class contentment and success—was a tinderbox of closeted feelings and mental repression. As a young boy Small was plagued with recurring respiratory problems. His father was a radiologist who, following the practice of the day, through x-rays and radiation therapy exposed his son to massive doses of radiation. While still at a young age, a growth began to form on Small's neck. Years after the diagnosis, Small awoke from this supposedly harmless operation to discover that he had been transformed into a virtual mute—one of his vocal cords had been removed along with the growth. He was fourteen, and had not been told that the radiation had given him cancer and he was expected to die. From there things began to stack up as his parents' hidden distress and anger started to seep through in fits of sadness and rage directed towards him. When the world became too much for the extremely talented Small to handle, he would escape into his own world of sketches and drawings.

== Reception ==
Stitches was reviewed by the New York Times and the Los Angeles Times. It was a #1 New York Times Best Seller, and was named one of the ten best books of 2009 by Publishers Weekly and Amazon.com. It was also a finalist for the 2009 National Book Award for Young People's Literature. Stitches was a 2010 Alex Awards recipient.

Stitches has been translated into seven languages and published in nine countries.
