= Marantette House =

- U.S. National Register of Historic Places
- Michigan State Historic Site
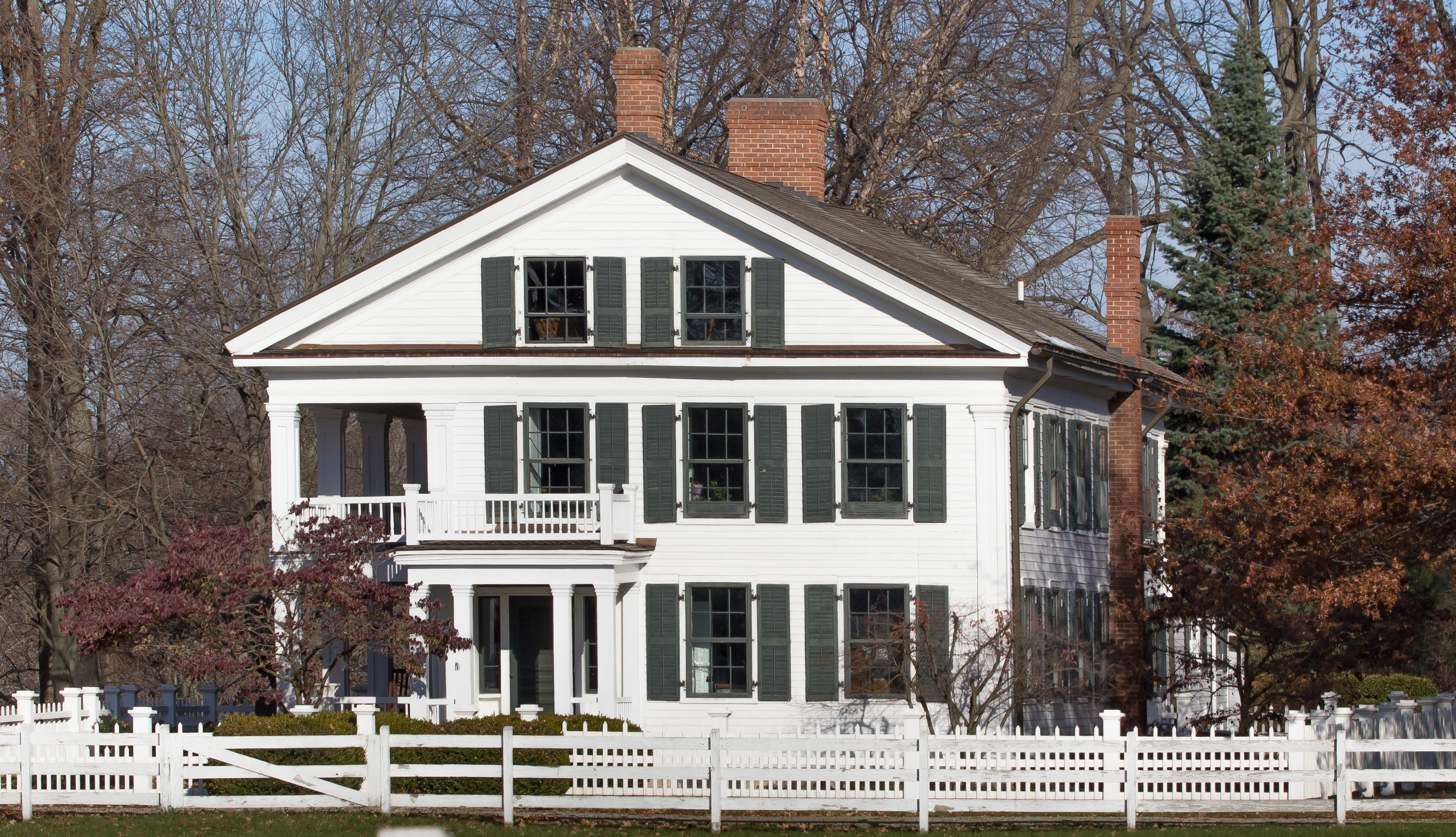
- Marantette House, 2018

- Location within Michigan Location within the United States
- Interactive map
- Location: 25538 Simpson Rd., Mendon, Michigan
- Coordinates: 42°0′0″N 85°27′19″W
- Area: 1 acre (0.40 ha)
- Built: 1835; 191 years ago
- Architectural style: Greek Revival
- NRHP reference No.: 73001947
- Added to NRHP: April 11, 1973

The Marantette House is a private house located on Simpson Road in Mendon, Michigan. It is significant as an impressive vernacular version of Greek Revival architecture. Located along the St. Joseph River, it is also one of the few local examples of a riverfront orientation of a house, dating from when river traffic dominated area transportation. The house was listed on the National Register of Historic Places in 1973.

It was built for Patrick Marantette from Detroit, who settled here in the 1830s as a trader with the Potawatomi and related Indians. Marantette descendants kept the house in the family into the 1970s.

== History ==
In 1829, brothers Peter and James Godfroy from Detroit established a trading post on this site, which was then called Nottawaseepe by the local Potawatomi, who had merged with some Odawa and Ojibwa (or, Chippewa, as they were known in the United States). The brothers' father, Col. Gabriel Godfroy, was the Sub-Agent of Indian Affairs for the Michigan Territory.

The Godfroys continued to live in Detroit, and appointed Frances Mouton as their agent at Nottawaseepe. The Godfroys owned a second trading post at Coldwater; their agent there was James's brother-in-law, Patrick Marantette. Also from Detroit and of French ancestry, he was said to be a descendant of the House of Navarre.

In 1833, Marantette replaced Mouton at Nottawaseepe. However, that same year the Treaty of Chicago was signed by members of the Council of Three Fires with the United States, ceding much of the territory in southwestern Michigan, including local land held by the band of Potawatomi. Although some land was left to them in the reserve, under the Indian Removal Act of 1830, the US government was encouraging Native Americans to move west of the Mississippi River to Indian Territory.

In the early years, most new settlers were ethnic French from Detroit and nearby areas. After that, more Yankees started arriving from New York and New England. In 1840 the US forcibly expelled most Native Americans remaining in this area.

In 1835, Marantette married Francis Mouton, the daughter of trader Frances Mouton; it was the first European marriage in the settlement. That same year, Marantette began working on construction of this house. As was the custom, its frontage overlooks the St. Joseph River, which was the major transportation route at the time. Their daughter Elizabeth Marantette, born in 1836, was the first European American born in the township.

Marantette continued to trade and provide supplies to the local band of Indians, but in 1840, the government decided to force the Indians to move out of the area. Negotiations to effect the move were undertaken at the Marantette House. The Potawatomi were persuaded to move, and Marantette was instructed to provide them with supplies, totaling several thousand dollars. The US government failed to reimburse him for the expense until 1850, leading him to sell off much of his surrounding land to cover the costs.

Patrick and Francis Marantette raised their family in this house, and lived there until their deaths. It passed on to their descendants. Marantette family members continued to own the house through at least the early 1970s. A descendant born in Mendon, Elliot Marantette "Pete" Estes (January 7, 1916 – March 24, 1988), had a career in the automotive industry in Detroit and served as the 15th president of General Motors, from 1974 to 1981.

== Gallery ==
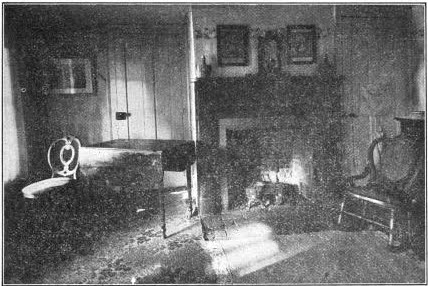
Interior c. 1922, featuring the pay table

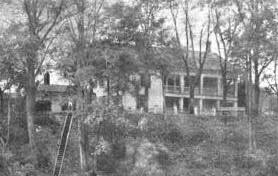
Riverside facade, c. 1912

== Description ==
The Marantette House is a two-story, frame, Greek Revival house located on a bluff overlooking the St. Joseph River. The river side has porches on both stories overlooking the river. A small entryway faced the road. The windows have six over six lights.

== See also ==
- National Register of Historic Places listings in St. Joseph County, Michigan
