= Pete Estes =

American businessman (1916–1988)

Elliot Marantette "Pete" Estes (January 7, 1916 – March 24, 1988) was an American automotive engineer and executive; he is best known as the fifteenth president of General Motors, from 1974 to 1981. He had previously been the Chief Engineer at Pontiac, President of Pontiac Division, and President of Chevrolet Division before becoming executive Vice President of General Motors in 1972.

== Biography ==
Elliot Marantette Estes was born on January 7, 1916, in Mendon, Michigan, and later moved to Constantine with his parents, where he graduated from the Constantine High School. He is descended on his mother's side from Patrick Marantette and Francis Mouton, early settlers in 1830s Mendon who were from Detroit and of French ancestry. After school Estes worked in a creamery in Constantine, Michigan.

At the suggestion of a cousin, he applied to the General Motors Institute (now Kettering University), an engineering institute started in Flint, Michigan, that had a cooperative study program combining work experience in the automotive industry. There he worked with Charles Kettering and later oversaw the successful introduction of the Oldsmobile Rocket V8 engine. Also, he was credited with coining the name for the Chevrolet Camaro.

Following his tenure as an engineer at Oldsmobile, Estes was appointed Chief Engineer at Pontiac in 1956 by Semon "Bunkie" Knudsen. After becoming General Manager of the Pontiac Division in 1961, he oversaw a dramatic increase in sales. He became General Manager of the Chevrolet Division in 1965, executive Vice President of General Motors in 1972, and served as President of GM from 1974 to his retirement from the company in 1981.

Estes was inducted into the Automotive Hall of Fame in 1999.

After his retirement, Estes served as a director on the board of the Kellogg Company. He died of a heart attack at O'Hare Airport on March 24, 1988, while on his way to a board meeting.

Business positions
Preceded by Ed Cole	President of General Motors Corporation; 1974– 1981	Succeeded by F. James McDonald
