= Sarah Stewart (author) =

American author of children's books (born 1939)

Sarah Stewart (born 1939) is an American author of children's books. She is married to David Small and lives in a manor house in Mendon, Michigan.

== Works ==
- The Money Tree, with David Small (illustrator), Farrar, Straus and Giroux, 1994.
- The Library with David Small (illustrator), Farrar, Straus and Giroux, 1995.
- The Gardener with David Small (illustrator), Farrar, Straus and Giroux, New York, 1997.
- The Journey, with David Small (illustrator), Farrar, Straus and Giroux 2001. A "Publishers Weekly" and "School Library Journal" Best Book of the Year.
- The Friend, with David Small (illustrator), Farrar, Straus and Giroux, 2004.
- The Quiet Place, with David Small (illustrator), Farrar, Straus and Giroux, 2012.
- This Book of Mine, with David Small (illustrator), Farrar, Straus and Giroux, 2019.

== Awards ==
- 1998 Caldecott Honor for The Gardener
- 2007 Michigan Author Award
