= Washington Mill Bridge =

- U.S. National Register of Historic Places
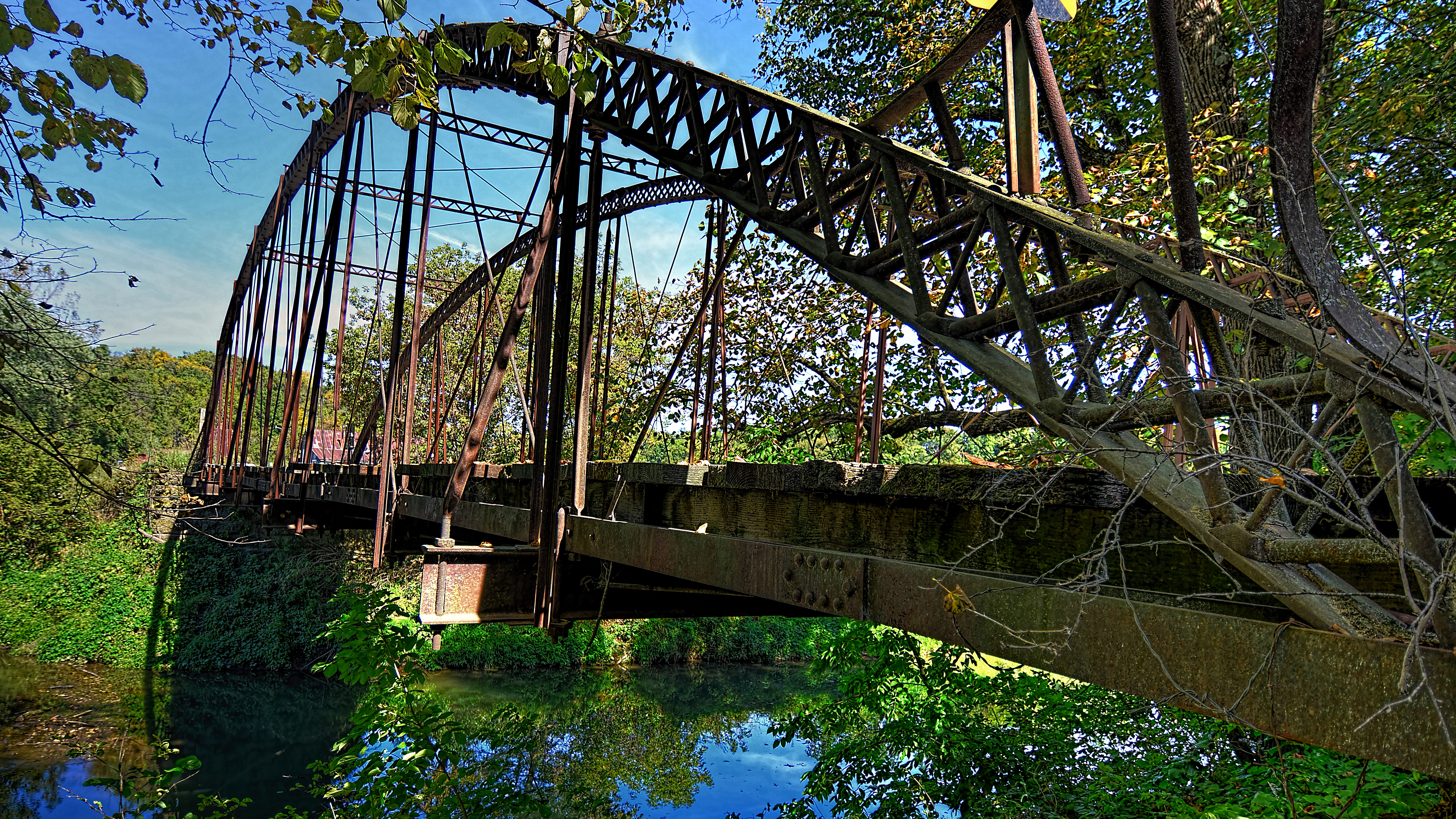

- Location within Iowa Location within the United States
- Nearest city: Bernard, Iowa
- Coordinates: 42°18′15″N 90°46′49″W
- Area: less than one acre
- Built: 1877-78
- Built by: Massillon Bridge Co.; Donahue, T.J.
- Architect: Massillon Bridge Co.
- Architectural style: Bowstring through arch-truss
- MPS: Highway Bridges of Iowa MPS
- NRHP reference No.: 98000788
- Added to NRHP: June 25, 1998

The Washington Mill Bridge is a road bridge crossing Lytle Creek near Bernard, Iowa that was built in 1877–78. It is a bowstring, through arch bridge, manufactured and built by the Massillon Bridge Company.

The bridge is significant for its engineering. Its span is 113 feet (34 m) and it cost $2,589. As of 1994, the bridge's setting was relatively unchanged since the bridge's construction more than 100 years before.

It was listed on the National Register of Historic Places in 1998.
