= Lytle Creek (Ohio) =

Stream in Clinton County, Ohio, U.S.

Lytle Creek is a stream in Clinton County, Ohio, in the United States.

Lytle Creek was named for Gen. William Lytle, of the Lytle family.

== Location ==
- Mouth: Confluence with Todd Fork, Clinton County at 39°25′30″N 83°57′02″W
- Source: East of Wilmington at 39°26′21″N 83°46′33″W

== See also ==
- List of rivers of Ohio
