= Lilley Road–Lower Rouge River Bridge =

- Lilley Road—Lower Rouge River Bridge
- U.S. National Register of Historic Places
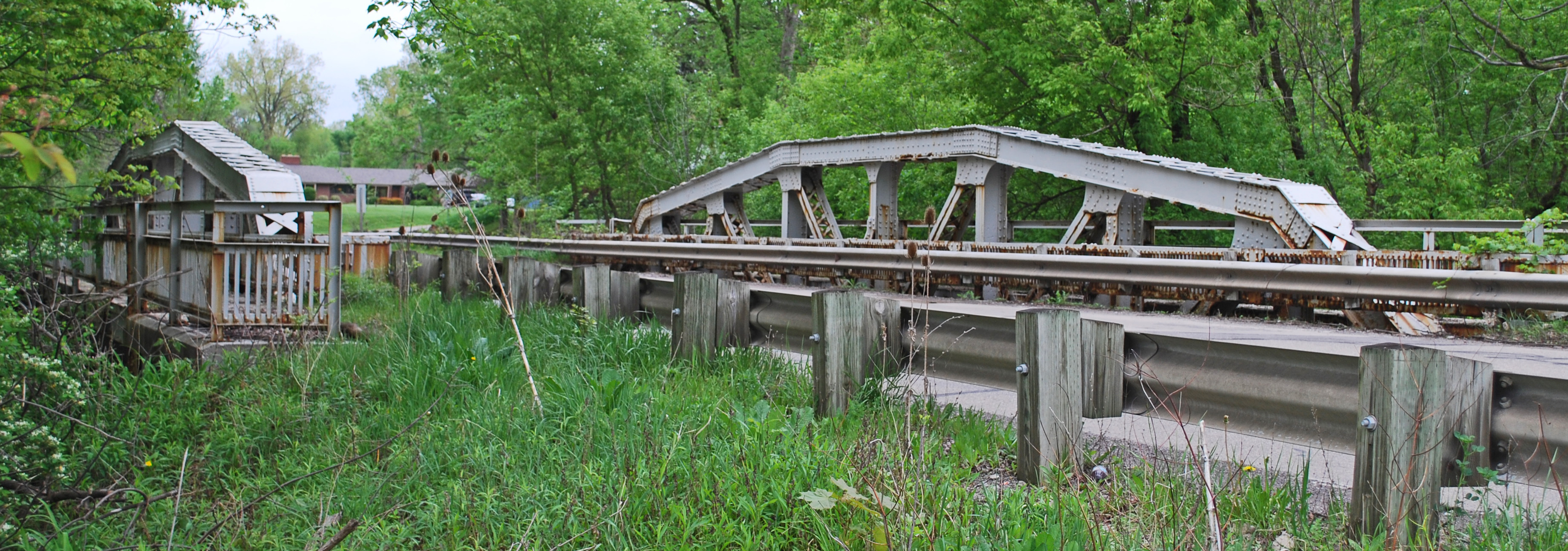
- The bridge in 2010, prior to its demolition

- Location within Michigan Location within the United States
- Interactive map
- Location: Lilley Road over Lower River Rouge; Canton, Michigan
- Coordinates: 42°16′46″N 83°27′24″W
- Area: less than one acre
- Built: 1923
- Built by: Massillon Bridge and Structural Co.
- Architect: Michigan State Highway Department
- Architectural style: Camelback pony truss
- Demolished: 2019
- MPS: Highway Bridges of Michigan MPS
- NRHP reference No.: 00000078
- Added to NRHP: February 10, 2000

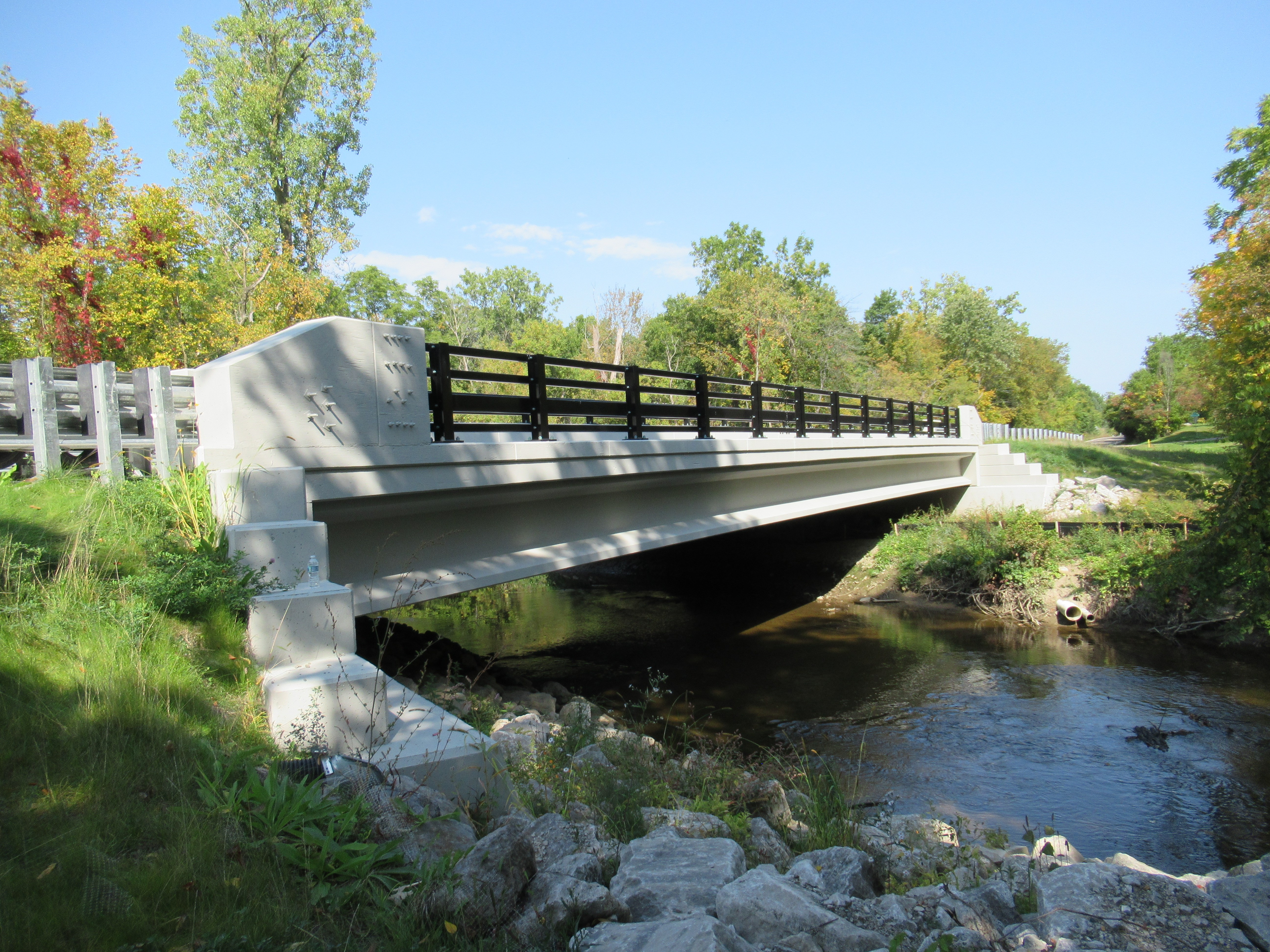
The replacement bridge built in 2019

The Lilley Road—Lower Rouge River Bridge was an automotive bridge located on Lilley Road over the Lower River Rouge in Canton, Michigan. It was listed on the National Register of Historic Places in 2000, but demolished in 2019.

== History ==
The Lilley Road Bridge spanning the Lower Rouge River was originally built in 1923–1924 by the Massillon Bridge Company of Massillon, Ohio, for installation where Telegraph Road crossed a branch of the River Rouge just north of Warren Road. However, just ten years later, Wayne County widened Telegraph, necessitating the removal of the bridge. At the same time, the county took responsibility for the Lilley Road crossing of the Lower River Rouge, which had been previously maintained by Canton Township. The county reworked the river channel and installed the truss bridge previously removed from the Telegraph Road site. The structural and historical integrity of the bridge was well-maintained during the re-installation.

The bridge was closed in 2017 and replaced in 2019.

== Description ==
The Lilley Road Bridge over the Lower River Rouge was an eight-panel Pratt camelback pony truss with an upper chord constructed from back-to-back channels tied by X-lacing, a lower chord constructed from channels with battens, and a floor of built-up I-beams riveted to superstructure. The entire length of the superstructure was 90 feet (27 m), with an 84-foot (26 m) span. The structure width was 27 feet (8.2 m), with a cantilevered sidewalk on each side of the roadway.
