= 1982 Michigan gubernatorial election =

- November 2, 1982
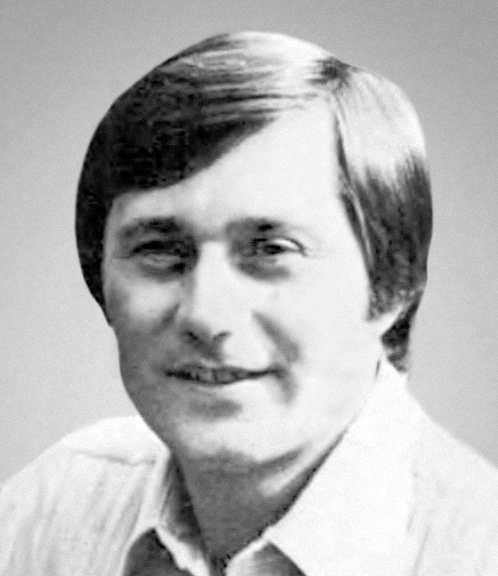

Nominee	James J. Blanchard	Richard Headlee
Party	Democratic	Republican
Running mate	Martha Griffiths	Thomas E. Brennan
Popular vote	1,561,291	1,369,582
Percentage	51.36%	45.05%
- County results Blanchard: 40–50% 50–60% 60–70% Headlee: 40–50% 50–60% 60–70%
Governor before election
William Milliken
Republican
Elected Governor
James J. Blanchard
Democratic

The 1982 Michigan gubernatorial election was held on November 2, 1982. Democrat James J. Blanchard defeated Republican Richard Headlee by 6.31% to become the first Democrat to win the governor’s mansion in Michigan since 1960.

== Primary election ==
Michigan held primary elections on August 10, 1982.

=== Republican party ===
Incumbent Governor William Milliken decided to retire rather than seek a fourth full term as governor. Businessman Richard Headlee narrowly defeated lieutenant governor James Brickley and L. Brooks Patterson in a three-way race for the Republican nomination.

==== Candidates ====
- James H. Brickley, Lieutenant Governor of Michigan
- Richard Headlee, businessman and anti-tax activist
- L. Brooks Patterson, Oakland County Prosecutor
- Jack Welborn, member of Michigan Senate

==== Results ====
Republican primary results
Party	Candidate	Votes	%
Republican	Richard Headlee	220,378	34.36%
Republican	James H. Brickley	194,429	30.31%
Republican	L. Brooks Patterson	180,065	28.07%
Republican	Jack Welborn	46,505	7.25%
Republican	Scattering	42	0.01%
Total votes		641,419	100.00%

=== Democratic party ===
Congressman James J. Blanchard won the Democratic primary against six other candidates, including William B. Fitzgerald, the party's nominee for governor in the previous election.

==== Candidates ====
- James J. Blanchard, Representative from Michigan's 18th congressional district
- Zolton Ferency, member of Ingham County Board of Commissioners and Democratic nominee for governor in 1966
- William B. Fitzgerald, former Majority Leader of the Michigan Senate and Democratic nominee for governor in 1978
- Kerry Kammer, member of Michigan Senate
- Edward C. Pierce, member of Michigan Senate
- David Plawecki, member of Michigan Senate
- John Safran, former member of Lapeer County Board of Commissioners

==== Results ====
Democratic primary results
Party	Candidate	Votes	%
Democratic	James J. Blanchard	406,941	50.22%
Democratic	William B. Fitzgerald	138,453	17.09%
Democratic	David Plawecki	95,805	11.82%
Democratic	Zolton Ferency	85,088	10.50%
Democratic	Edward C. Pierce	44,894	5.54%
Democratic	Kerry Kammer	32,221	3.98%
Democratic	John Safran	6,782	0.84%
Democratic	Scattering	60	0.01%
Total votes		810,244	100.00%

== General election ==
=== Candidates ===
Major party candidates

- Richard Headlee & Thomas E. Brennan, Republican
- James J. Blanchard & Martha Griffiths, Democratic

Other candidates

- Tim Craine & Elizabeth Ziers, Socialist Workers
- Dick Jacobs & Steven J. Furr, Libertarian
- Martin P. McLaughlin & Ruth Keedy, Workers League
- James Phillips & DeLoyd G. Hesselink, American Independent
- Robert Tisch & Clair White, Tisch Independent Citizens

=== Results ===
1982 Michigan gubernatorial election
Party	Candidate	Votes	%	±%
Democratic	James J. Blanchard	1,561,291	51.36%	+8.21%
Republican	Richard Headlee	1,369,582	45.05%	−11.74%
Tisch Independent Citizens	Robert Tisch	80,288	2.64%	
Libertarian	Dick Jacobs	15,603	0.51%	
American Independent	James Phillips	7,356	0.24%	
Socialist Workers	Tim Craine	3,682	0.12%	
Workers League	Martin P. McLaughlin	1,980	0.07%	
	Scattering	226	0.01%	
Majority		191,709	6.31%	
Total votes		3,040,008	100.00%	
Democratic gain from Republican		Swing	+19.95%	

==== Results by county ====
Luce County and Washtenaw County voted Democratic for the first time since 1914. Additionally, Alpena County and Saginaw County voted Democratic for the first time since 1932 and 1936, respectively.

County	James J. Blanchard Democratic		Richard Headlee Republican		Robert Tisch Independent		Dick Jacobs Libertarian		All Others Various		Margin		Total votes cast
County	#	%	#	%	#	%	#	%	#	%	#	%	Total votes cast
Alcona	1,852	45.03%	2,153	52.35%	74	1.80%	10	0.24%	24	0.58%	-301	-7.32%	4,113
Alger	1,993	57.95%	1,372	39.90%	46	1.34%	12	0.35%	16	0.47%	621	18.06%	3,439
Allegan	8,849	34.53%	15,927	62.15%	580	2.26%	156	0.61%	115	0.45%	-7,078	-27.62%	25,627
Alpena	5,744	49.94%	5,516	47.96%	124	1.08%	43	0.37%	75	0.65%	228	1.98%	11,502
Antrim	2,799	41.73%	3,669	54.70%	146	2.18%	57	0.85%	37	0.55%	-870	-12.97%	6,708
Arenac	2,502	50.15%	2,237	44.84%	211	4.23%	15	0.30%	24	0.48%	265	5.31%	4,989
Baraga	1,697	52.93%	1,367	42.64%	34	1.06%	17	0.53%	91	2.84%	330	10.29%	3,206
Barry	6,670	40.27%	9,313	56.22%	421	2.54%	93	0.56%	67	0.40%	-2,643	-15.96%	16,564
Bay	23,028	54.45%	16,086	38.04%	2,826	6.68%	210	0.50%	140	0.33%	6,942	16.42%	42,290
Benzie	1,980	43.94%	2,345	52.04%	103	2.29%	47	1.04%	31	0.69%	-365	-8.10%	4,506
Berrien	18,753	41.15%	25,453	55.85%	958	2.10%	208	0.46%	202	0.44%	-6,700	-14.70%	45,574
Branch	4,474	37.73%	6,910	58.28%	382	3.22%	42	0.35%	49	0.41%	-2,436	-20.54%	11,857
Calhoun	22,564	45.34%	25,646	51.54%	1,181	2.37%	152	0.31%	220	0.44%	-3,082	-6.19%	49,763
Cass	6,273	47.33%	6,552	49.43%	316	2.38%	60	0.45%	53	0.40%	-279	-2.11%	13,254
Charlevoix	3,600	45.58%	4,062	51.43%	127	1.61%	59	0.75%	50	0.63%	462	5.85%	7,898
Cheboygan	3,946	49.65%	3,809	47.93%	122	1.54%	39	0.49%	31	0.39%	137	1.72%	7,947
Chippewa	5,332	50.56%	4,990	47.32%	112	1.06%	53	0.50%	59	0.56%	342	3.24%	10,546
Clare	4,113	49.55%	3,865	46.57%	273	2.93%	43	0.52%	36	0.43%	248	2.99%	8,300
Clinton	7,569	37.97%	11,267	56.53%	873	4.38%	114	0.57%	109	0.55%	-3,698	-18.55%	19,932
Crawford	1,770	45.95%	1,948	50.57%	98	2.54%	21	0.55%	15	0.39%	-178	-4.62%	3,852
Delta	7,953	59.10%	5,283	39.26%	131	0.97%	38	0.28%	52	0.39%	2,670	19.84%	13,457
Dickinson	4,766	49.54%	4,622	48.04%	175	1.82%	25	0.26%	33	0.34%	144	1.50%	9,621
Eaton	12,767	40.64%	17,330	55.16%	953	3.03%	223	0.71%	145	0.46%	-4,563	-14.52%	31,418
Emmet	3,617	41.38%	4,929	56.39%	105	1.20%	57	0.65%	33	0.38%	-1,312	-15.01%	8,741
Genesee	81,331	57.71%	50,268	35.67%	7,732	5.49%	1,013	0.72%	578	0.41%	31,063	22.04%	140,922
Gladwin	3,546	51.99%	2,982	43.72%	237	3.47%	32	0.47%	24	0.35%	564	8.27%	6,821
Gogebic	4,730	66.30%	2,323	32.56%	43	0.60%	12	0.17%	26	0.36%	2,407	33.74%	7,134
Grand Traverse	7,081	35.65%	12,188	61.37%	307	1.55%	198	1.00%	87	0.44%	-5,107	-25.71%	19,861
Gratiot	4,963	42.65%	6,186	53.16%	383	3.29%	58	0.50%	47	0.40%	-1,223	-10.51%	11,637
Hillsdale	3,915	32.10%	7,696	63.10%	486	3.98%	46	0.38%	54	0.44%	-3,781	-31.00%	12,197
Houghton	6,598	53.12%	5,582	44.94%	112	0.90%	67	0.54%	61	0.49%	1,016	8.18%	12,420
Huron	4,589	37.48%	7,309	59.69%	245	2.00%	40	0.33%	62	0.51%	-2,720	-22.21%	12,245
Ingham	50,120	51.12%	44,205	45.08%	1,986	2.03%	1,115	1.14%	625	0.64%	5,915	6.03%	98,051
Ionia	6,789	41.61%	8,794	53.89%	450	2.76%	190	1.16%	94	0.58%	-2,005	-12.29%	16,317
Iosco	4,488	49.18%	4,346	47.62%	233	2.55%	34	0.37%	25	0.27%	142	1.56%	9,126
Iron	3,672	58.33%	2,516	39.97%	73	1.16%	16	0.25%	18	0.29%	1,156	18.36%	6,295
Isabella	6,318	44.47%	7,350	51.74%	318	2.24%	137	0.96%	83	0.58%	-1,032	-7.26%	14,206
Jackson	20,608	40.46%	28,507	55.97%	1,336	2.62%	262	0.51%	216	0.42%	-7,899	-15.51%	50,929
Kalamazoo	33,566	47.02%	36,050	50.50%	748	1.05%	671	0.94%	347	0.49%	-2,484	-3.48%	71,382
Kalkaska	1,725	43.51%	2,073	52.28%	101	2.55%	29	0.73%	37	0.93%	-348	-8.78%	3,965
Kent	69,327	42.66%	88,760	54.62%	3,011	1.85%	673	0.41%	740	0.46%	-19,433	-11.96%	162,511
Keweenaw	619	56.89%	461	42.37%	5	0.46%	2	0.18%	1	0.09%	158	14.52%	1,088
Lake	1,786	56.20%	1,246	39.21%	120	3.78%	14	0.44%	12	0.38%	540	16.99%	3,178
Lapeer	9,299	41.87%	11,359	51.14%	1,375	6.19%	107	0.48%	71	0.32%	-2,060	-9.27%	22,211
Leelanau	2,229	35.34%	3,891	61.68%	86	1.36%	64	1.01%	38	0.60%	-1,662	-26.35%	6,308
Lenawee	11,567	43.48%	13,641	51.28%	1,205	4.53%	70	0.26%	117	0.44%	-2,074	-7.80%	26,600
Livingston	11,888	35.22%	20,326	60.22%	1,258	3.73%	182	0.54%	97	0.29%	-8,438	-25.00%	33,751
Luce	1,165	52.22%	1,024	45.90%	15	0.67%	11	0.49%	16	0.72%	141	6.32%	2,231
Mackinac	2,261	49.75%	2,190	48.18%	49	1.08%	23	0.51%	22	0.48%	71	1.56%	4,545
Macomb	117,540	50.65%	105,341	45.40%	7,149	3.08%	995	0.43%	1,022	0.44%	12,199	5.26%	232,047
Manistee	4,312	49.98%	4,052	46.97%	188	2.18%	25	0.29%	50	0.58%	260	3.01%	8,627
Marquette	12,682	59.28%	8,308	38.84%	241	1.13%	75	0.35%	86	0.40%	4,374	20.45%	21,392
Mason	4,214	43.68%	4,963	51.44%	394	4.08%	30	0.31%	47	0.49%	-749	-7.76%	9,648
Mecosta	4,135	41.00%	5,634	55.86%	218	2.16%	61	0.60%	38	0.38%	-1,499	-14.86%	10,086
Menominee	4,164	52.76%	3,367	42.66%	312	3.95%	22	0.28%	28	0.35%	797	10.10%	7,893
Midland	12,326	44.65%	14,297	51.79%	577	2.09%	277	1.00%	128	0.46%	-1,971	-7.14%	27,605
Missaukee	1,515	35.30%	2,624	61.14%	114	2.66%	24	0.56%	15	0.35%	-1,109	-25.84%	4,292
Monroe	17,785	49.98%	16,011	45.00%	1,562	4.39%	87	0.24%	136	0.38%	1,774	4.99%	35,581
Montcalm	6,356	43.26%	7,739	52.67%	458	3.12%	68	0.46%	71	0.48%	-1,383	-9.41%	14,692
Montmorency	1,545	44.50%	1,822	52.48%	64	1.84%	13	0.37%	28	0.81%	-277	-7.98%	3,472
Muskegon	25,851	49.14%	25,261	48.02%	965	1.83%	206	0.39%	323	0.61%	590	1.12%	52,606
Newaygo	4,817	40.57%	6,689	56.34%	285	2.40%	36	0.30%	46	0.39%	-1,872	-15.77%	11,873
Oakland	167,687	45.78%	184,123	50.26%	10,927	2.98%	2,013	0.55%	1,555	0.42%	-16,436	-4.49%	366,305
Oceana	3,161	42.01%	4,044	53.74%	253	3.36%	28	0.37%	39	0.52%	-883	-11.73%	7,525
Ogemaw	3,558	54.11%	2,722	41.40%	244	3.71%	22	0.33%	29	0.44%	836	12.71%	6,575
Ontonagon	2,360	56.59%	1,730	41.49%	50	1.20%	15	0.36%	15	0.36%	630	15.11%	4,170
Osceola	2,561	37.76%	3,923	57.84%	204	3.01%	45	0.66%	49	0.72%	-1,362	-20.08%	6,782
Oscoda	1,278	46.17%	1,372	49.57%	70	2.53%	29	1.05%	19	0.69%	-94	-3.40%	2,768
Otsego	2,412	43.83%	2,936	53.35%	95	1.73%	29	0.53%	31	0.56%	-524	-9.52%	5,503
Ottawa	16,441	28.17%	40,399	69.22%	1,064	1.82%	235	0.40%	222	0.38%	-23,958	-41.05%	58,361
Presque Isle	2,761	48.74%	2,747	48.49%	102	1.80%	32	0.56%	23	0.41%	14	0.25%	5,665
Roscommon	4,046	50.00%	3,729	46.08%	249	3.08%	34	0.42%	34	0.42%	317	3.92%	8,092
Saginaw	41,003	53.98%	32,380	42.63%	2,010	2.65%	354	0.47%	214	0.28%	8,623	11.35%	75,961
Sanilac	5,070	36.33%	8,357	59.88%	443	3.17%	40	0.29%	46	0.33%	-3,287	-23.55%	13,956
Schoolcraft	1,964	57.34%	1,400	40.88%	44	1.28%	6	0.18%	11	0.32%	564	16.47%	3,425
Shiawassee	11,099	45.02%	10,857	44.04%	2,344	9.51%	238	0.97%	116	0.47%	242	0.98%	24,654
St. Clair	20,724	46.21%	22,213	49.54%	1,517	3.38%	214	0.48%	175	0.39%	-1,489	-3.32%	44,843
St. Joseph	6,306	40.30%	8,983	57.40%	215	1.37%	75	0.48%	70	0.45%	-2,677	-17.11%	15,649
Tuscola	7,638	45.13%	8,539	50.45%	610	3.60%	56	0.33%	83	0.49%	-901	-6.32%	16,926
Van Buren	8,847	44.20%	10,611	53.01%	322	1.61%	119	0.59%	119	0.59%	-1,764	-8.81%	20,018
Washtenaw	46,319	55.85%	34,005	41.00%	1,481	1.79%	644	0.78%	488	0.59%	12,314	14.85%	82,937
Wayne	466,088	66.56%	215,986	30.84%	13,038	1.86%	2,535	0.36%	2,643	0.38%	250,102	35.71%	700,290
Wexford	3,935	44.95%	4,494	51.34%	224	2.56%	61	0.70%	40	0.46%	-559	-6.39%	8,754
Total	1,561,291	51.36%	1,369,582	45.05%	80,288	2.64%	15,603	0.51%	13,244	0.44%	191,709	6.31%	3,040,008

===== Counties that flipped from Republican to Democratic =====
- Alpena
- Cheboygan
- Chippewa
- Genesee
- Houghton
- Ingham
- Iosco
- Luce
- Mackinac
- Macomb
- Manistee
- Monroe
- Muskegon
- Saginaw
- Shiawassee
- Washtenaw
- Wayne

===== Counties that flipped from Democratic to Republican =====
- Alcona
- Kalkaska
- Missaukee
- Montmorency
- Oscoda
