= Senator Milliken =

Senator Milliken may refer to:

- Carl Milliken (1877–1961), Maine State Senate
- James T. Milliken (1882–1952), Michigan State Senate
- James W. Milliken (1848–1908), Michigan State Senate
- William Milliken (1922–2019), Michigan State Senate

== See also ==
- Eugene Millikin (1891–1958), U.S. Senator from Colorado from 1941 to 1957
