= 1974 Michigan gubernatorial election =

- November 5, 1974
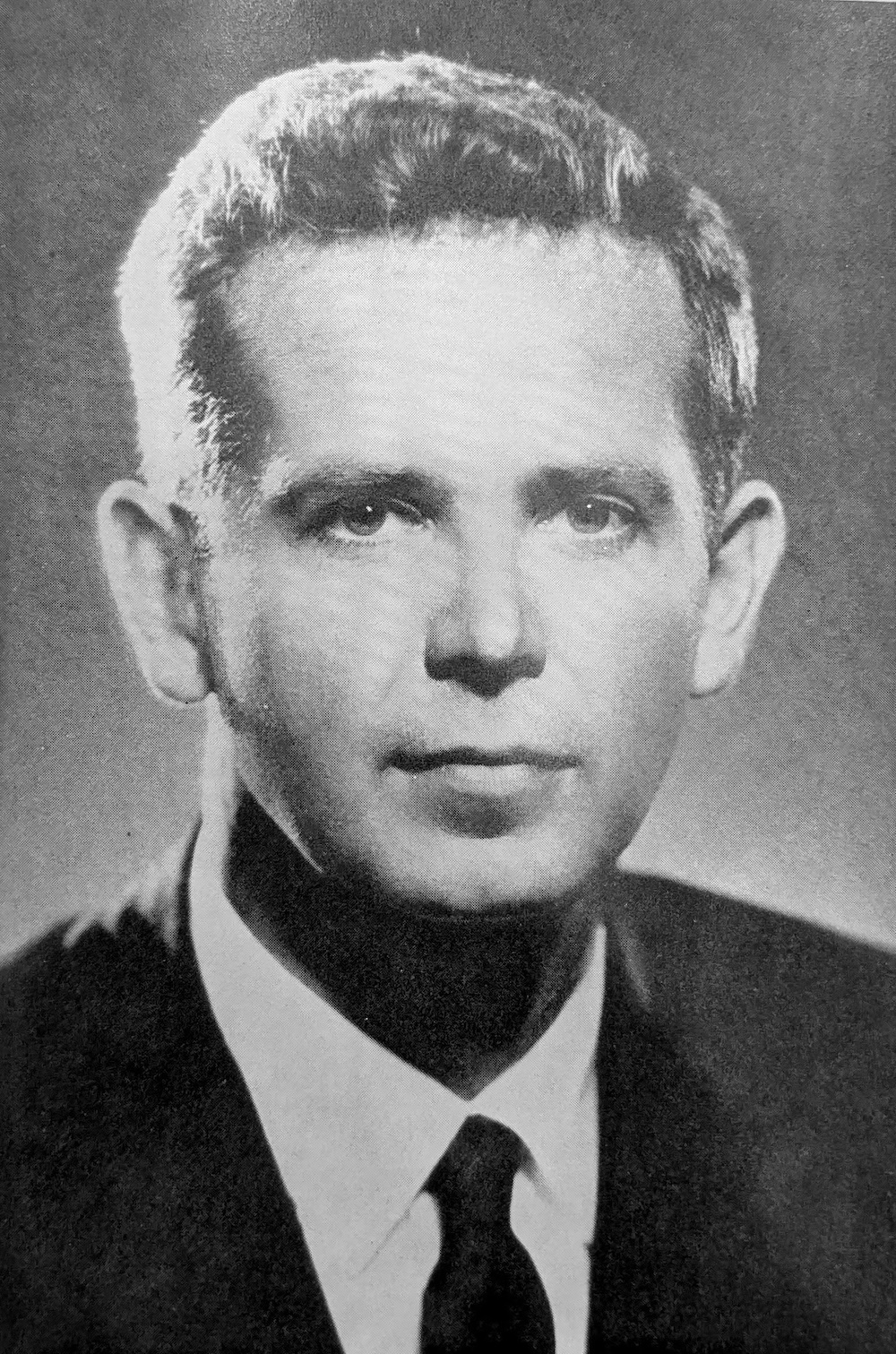

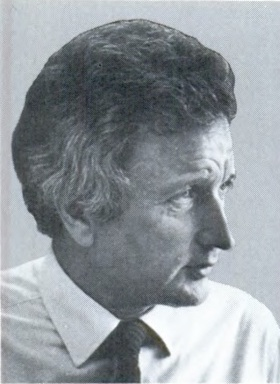
Nominee	William Milliken	Sander Levin
Party	Republican	Democratic
Running mate	James Damman	Paul Brown
Popular vote	1,356,865	1,242,247
Percentage	51.07%	46.75%
- County results Milliken: 40–50% 50–60% 60–70% Levin: 40–50% 50–60% 60–70%
Governor before election
William G. Milliken
Republican
Governor
William G. Milliken
Republican

The 1974 Michigan gubernatorial election was held on November 5, 1974. William Milliken was elected to his second full term as governor of Michigan in a rematch with Sander Levin. This was the last time until 1990 that the state elected a governor of the same party as the sitting president.

== Primary elections ==
Michigan held primary elections on August 6, 1974.

=== Republican party ===
Incumbent governor William Milliken was unopposed for the Republican nomination.

==== Candidates ====
- William Milliken, incumbent governor

==== Results ====
Republican primary results
Party	Candidate	Votes	%
Republican	William Milliken (inc.)	326,454	100.00%
Total votes		326,454	100.00%

=== Democratic party ===
Sander M. Levin won the Democratic nomination for the second consecutive election.

==== Candidates ====
- Jerome P. Cavanagh, former mayor of Detroit
- Sander M. Levin, Democratic nominee for governor in 1970
- James E. Wells, attorney from Southfield

==== Results ====
Democratic primary results
Party	Candidate	Votes	%
Democratic	Sander M. Levin	445,273	61.29%
Democratic	Jerome P. Cavanagh	199,361	27.44%
Democratic	James E. Wells	81,844	11.27%
Total votes		726,478	100.00%

== General election ==
=== Candidates ===
Major party candidates

- Sander M. Levin & Paul Brown, Democratic
- William G. Milliken & James Damman, Republican

Other candidates

- Eldon K. Andrews & Al G. Terwilliger, Conservative
- Hugh McDermand Davidson & Josephine A. Chapman, American Independent
- Thomas Dennis & William Allan, Communist
- Zolton Ferency & Regina McNulty, Human Rights
- James Horvath & Alfred W. Wegener, Socialist Labor
- Robin Maisel & Ruth C. Getts, Socialist Workers
- Peter Signorelli & Ronald Wayne Evans, U.S. Labor

=== Results ===
1974 Michigan gubernatorial election
Party	Candidate	Votes	%	±%
Republican	William G. Milliken (inc.)	1,356,865	51.07%	+0.65%
Democratic	Sander M. Levin	1,242,247	46.75	−1.99%
Human Rights	Zolton Ferency	28,675	1.08%	
American Independent	Hugh McDermand Davidson	20,278	0.76%	+0.09%
Conservative	Eldon K. Andrews	4,117	0.15%	
Socialist Workers	Robin Maisel	1,505	0.06%	−0.03%
Socialist Labor	James Horvath	1,296	0.05%	−0.03%
Communist	Thomas Dennis	1,119	0.04%	
U.S. Labor	Peter Signorelli	898	0.03%	
	Scattering	17	0.00%	
Majority		114,618	4.31%	
Total votes		2,657,017	100.00%	
Republican hold		Swing	+2.64%	

==== Results by county ====
Kalkaska County voted Democratic for the first time since 1912, and for only the second time since it was organized in 1871. Gladwin County and Mackinac County voted Democratic for the first time since 1932. This was the only gubernatorial election from 1954 to 1998 in which Monroe County voted for the losing candidate.

County	William Milliken Republican		Sander Levin Democratic		Zolton Ferency Human Rights		Hugh M. Davidson American Independent		All others Various		Margin		Total votes cast
County	#	%	#	%	#	%	#	%	#	%	#	%	Total votes cast
Alcona	1,616	53.56%	1,369	45.38%	6	0.20%	20	0.66%	6	0.20%	247	8.19%	3,017
Alger	1,366	41.41%	1,896	57.47%	21	0.64%	11	0.33%	5	0.15%	-530	-16.07%	3,299
Allegan	12,917	61.87%	7,565	36.23%	58	0.28%	288	1.38%	51	0.24%	5,352	25.63%	20,879
Alpena	4,776	49.55%	4,721	48.98%	53	0.55%	67	0.70%	22	0.23%	55	0.57%	9,639
Antrim	3,228	59.28%	2,134	39.19%	19	0.35%	51	0.94%	13	0.24%	1,094	20.09%	5,445
Arenac	1,948	51.56%	1,802	47.70%	5	0.13%	19	0.50%	4	0.11%	146	3.86%	3,778
Baraga	1,437	49.36%	1,440	49.47%	10	0.34%	16	0.55%	8	0.27%	-3	-0.10%	2,911
Barry	7,739	57.63%	5,493	40.91%	42	0.31%	148	1.10%	6	0.04%	2,246	16.73%	13,428
Bay	17,491	46.24%	19,945	52.73%	108	0.29%	210	0.56%	70	0.19%	-2,454	-6.49%	37,824
Benzie	2,079	60.03%	1,354	39.10%	12	0.35%	15	0.43%	3	0.09%	725	20.94%	3,463
Berrien	24,971	57.05%	17,778	40.62%	130	0.30%	685	1.56%	207	0.47%	7,193	16.43%	43,771
Branch	5,887	57.06%	4,310	41.78%	34	0.33%	65	0.63%	21	0.20%	1,577	15.29%	10,317
Calhoun	22,254	55.06%	17,488	43.27%	191	0.47%	350	0.87%	132	0.33%	4,766	11.79%	40,415
Cass	6,077	52.04%	5,416	46.38%	31	0.27%	106	0.91%	48	0.41%	661	5.66%	11,678
Charlevoix	3,530	51.49%	3,231	47.13%	24	0.35%	61	0.89%	10	0.15%	299	4.36%	6,856
Cheboygan	3,621	54.86%	2,886	43.72%	22	0.33%	65	0.98%	7	0.11%	735	11.13%	6,601
Chippewa	4,877	52.99%	4,184	45.46%	57	0.62%	65	0.71%	21	0.23%	693	7.53%	9,204
Clare	3,129	50.34%	2,974	47.84%	12	0.19%	35	0.56%	66	1.06%	155	2.49%	6,216
Clinton	9,020	58.17%	6,163	39.75%	153	0.99%	124	0.80%	45	0.29%	2,857	18.43%	15,505
Crawford	1,470	57.85%	1,042	41.01%	13	0.51%	13	0.51%	3	0.12%	428	16.84%	2,541
Delta	5,615	42.04%	7,551	56.53%	72	0.54%	82	0.61%	37	0.28%	-1,936	-14.49%	13,357
Dickinson	4,183	43.40%	5,347	55.47%	24	0.25%	58	0.60%	27	0.28%	-1,164	-12.08%	9,639
Eaton	14,640	61.78%	8,625	36.40%	255	1.08%	128	0.54%	49	0.21%	6,015	25.38%	23,697
Emmet	3,971	56.71%	2,924	41.76%	30	0.43%	63	0.90%	14	0.20%	1,047	14.95%	7,002
Genesee	57,509	48.21%	59,510	49.89%	1,189	1.00%	729	0.61%	342	0.29%	-2,001	-1.68%	119,279
Gladwin	2,454	49.02%	2,505	50.04%	9	0.18%	25	0.50%	13	0.26%	-51	-1.02%	5,006
Gogebic	3,005	35.34%	5,415	63.69%	31	0.36%	32	0.38%	19	0.22%	-2,410	-28.35%	8,502
Grand Traverse	9,508	63.85%	5,104	34.27%	71	0.48%	153	1.03%	56	0.38%	4,404	29.57%	14,892
Gratiot	6,417	61.48%	3,913	37.49%	47	0.45%	41	0.39%	20	0.19%	2,504	23.99%	10,438
Hillsdale	5,983	59.04%	3,992	39.39%	40	0.39%	93	0.92%	26	0.26%	1,991	19.65%	10,134
Houghton	6,236	52.90%	5,425	46.02%	43	0.36%	60	0.51%	25	0.21%	811	6.88%	11,789
Huron	7,172	62.58%	4,119	35.94%	27	0.24%	131	1.14%	12	0.10%	3,053	26.64%	11,461
Ingham	52,519	59.03%	31,116	34.98%	4,656	5.23%	335	0.38%	340	0.38%	21,403	24.06%	88,966
Ionia	7,861	55.52%	6,110	43.15%	49	0.35%	127	0.90%	12	0.08%	1,751	12.37%	14,159
Iosco	3,826	52.82%	3,349	46.23%	24	0.33%	28	0.39%	17	0.23%	477	6.58%	7,244
Iron	2,774	43.93%	3,499	55.42%	15	0.24%	12	0.19%	14	0.22%	-725	-11.48%	6,314
Isabella	6,342	52.85%	5,278	43.98%	245	2.04%	77	0.64%	59	0.49%	1,064	8.87%	12,001
Jackson	22,998	54.22%	18,547	43.72%	235	0.55%	546	1.29%	92	0.22%	4,451	10.49%	42,418
Kalamazoo	35,200	60.52%	21,732	37.36%	565	0.97%	491	0.84%	178	0.31%	13,468	23.15%	58,166
Kalkaska	1,285	48.79%	1,300	49.35%	9	0.34%	31	1.18%	9	0.34%	-15	-0.57%	2,634
Kent	81,040	58.90%	54,047	39.28%	489	0.36%	1,665	1.21%	347	0.25%	26,993	19.62%	137,588
Keweenaw	536	50.14%	529	49.49%	1	0.09%	3	0.28%	0	0.00%	7	0.65%	1,069
Lake	1,272	45.90%	1,467	52.94%	8	0.29%	22	0.79%	2	0.07%	-195	-7.04%	2,771
Lapeer	8,050	53.71%	6,560	43.77%	86	0.57%	245	1.63%	47	0.31%	1,490	9.94%	14,988
Leelanau	3,147	61.07%	1,924	37.34%	33	0.64%	39	0.76%	10	0.19%	1,223	23.73%	5,153
Lenawee	12,269	55.59%	9,505	43.07%	119	0.54%	115	0.52%	63	0.29%	2,764	12.52%	22,071
Livingston	13,274	61.99%	7,671	35.83%	219	1.02%	185	0.86%	63	0.29%	5,603	26.17%	21,412
Luce	1,028	50.44%	1,004	49.26%	1	0.05%	4	0.20%	1	0.05%	24	1.18%	2,038
Mackinac	2,219	48.30%	2,326	50.63%	18	0.39%	21	0.46%	10	0.22%	-107	-2.33%	4,594
Macomb	90,896	50.09%	86,356	47.59%	1,676	0.92%	1,822	1.00%	717	0.40%	4,540	2.50%	181,467
Manistee	3,715	51.19%	3,457	47.64%	21	0.29%	45	0.62%	19	0.26%	258	3.56%	7,257
Marquette	9,018	47.02%	9,825	51.23%	169	0.88%	116	0.60%	51	0.27%	-807	-4.21%	19,179
Mason	4,371	53.28%	3,738	45.56%	19	0.23%	56	0.68%	20	0.24%	633	7.72%	8,204
Mecosta	4,511	56.53%	3,350	41.98%	49	0.61%	46	0.58%	24	0.30%	1,161	14.55%	7,980
Menominee	3,620	44.95%	4,331	53.78%	18	0.22%	67	0.83%	17	0.21%	-711	-8.83%	8,053
Midland	12,464	59.32%	8,211	39.08%	119	0.57%	161	0.77%	55	0.26%	4,253	20.24%	21,010
Missaukee	2,038	62.10%	1,211	36.90%	7	0.21%	23	0.70%	3	0.09%	827	25.20%	3,282
Monroe	14,439	47.27%	15,530	50.85%	175	0.57%	324	1.06%	75	0.25%	-1,091	-3.57%	30,543
Montcalm	6,787	57.09%	4,924	41.42%	40	0.34%	121	1.02%	17	0.14%	1,863	15.67%	11,889
Montmorency	1,447	56.02%	1,097	42.47%	10	0.39%	27	1.05%	2	0.08%	350	13.55%	2,583
Muskegon	23,589	48.45%	24,334	49.98%	120	0.25%	521	1.07%	123	0.25%	-745	-1.53%	48,687
Newaygo	5,498	53.48%	4,629	45.03%	28	0.27%	104	1.01%	21	0.20%	869	8.45%	10,280
Oakland	168,527	57.26%	118,938	40.41%	3,404	1.16%	2,213	0.75%	1,261	0.43%	49,589	16.85%	294,343
Oceana	3,188	50.35%	3,049	48.15%	18	0.28%	70	1.11%	7	0.11%	139	2.20%	6,332
Ogemaw	2,411	52.31%	2,142	46.47%	16	0.35%	34	0.74%	6	0.13%	269	5.84%	4,609
Ontonagon	1,969	43.65%	2,518	55.82%	6	0.13%	15	0.33%	3	0.07%	-549	-12.17%	4,511
Osceola	3,063	58.81%	2,046	39.29%	19	0.36%	67	1.29%	13	0.25%	1,017	19.53%	5,208
Oscoda	998	57.26%	721	41.37%	6	0.34%	12	0.69%	6	0.34%	277	15.89%	1,743
Otsego	2,118	54.36%	1,736	44.56%	10	0.26%	23	0.59%	9	0.23%	382	9.80%	3,896
Ottawa	31,366	67.19%	14,622	31.32%	143	0.31%	468	1.00%	87	0.19%	16,744	35.87%	46,686
Presque Isle	2,684	49.81%	2,673	49.61%	8	0.15%	18	0.33%	5	0.09%	11	0.20%	5,388
Roscommon	3,403	57.37%	2,464	41.54%	23	0.39%	36	0.61%	6	0.10%	939	15.83%	5,932
Saginaw	33,797	52.68%	29,597	46.14%	231	0.36%	364	0.57%	164	0.26%	4,200	6.55%	64,153
Sanilac	7,641	63.02%	4,295	35.42%	34	0.28%	136	1.12%	19	0.16%	3,346	27.60%	12,125
Schoolcraft	1,403	42.28%	1,899	57.23%	9	0.27%	5	0.15%	2	0.06%	-496	-14.95%	3,318
Shiawassee	10,476	53.02%	8,852	44.80%	202	1.02%	180	0.91%	50	0.25%	1,624	8.22%	19,760
St. Clair	18,210	51.21%	16,702	46.97%	216	0.61%	346	0.97%	86	0.24%	1,508	4.24%	35,560
St. Joseph	7,705	59.27%	5,119	39.38%	27	0.21%	132	1.02%	17	0.13%	2,586	19.89%	13,000
Tuscola	8,804	59.70%	5,767	39.11%	40	0.27%	110	0.75%	25	0.17%	3,037	20.60%	14,746
Van Buren	9,189	56.22%	6,771	41.43%	48	0.29%	283	1.73%	53	0.32%	2,418	14.79%	16,344
Washtenaw	41,085	54.22%	29,064	38.35%	4,771	6.30%	551	0.73%	307	0.41%	12,021	15.86%	75,778
Wayne	290,894	40.94%	405,461	57.07%	7,353	1.03%	3,764	0.53%	3,019	0.42%	-114,567	-16.13%	710,491
Wexford	3,775	53.09%	3,233	45.46%	29	0.41%	63	0.89%	11	0.15%	542	7.62%	7,111
Total	1,356,865	51.07%	1,242,247	46.75%	28,675	1.08%	20,278	0.76%	8,952	0.34%	114,618	4.31%	2,657,017

===== Counties that flipped from Democratic to Republican =====
- Arenac
- Macomb
- Ogemaw
- Shiawassee

===== Counties that flipped from Republican to Democratic =====
- Gladwin
- Kalkaska
- Mackinac
- Monroe
- Muskegon
