= William B. Fitzgerald Jr. =

American politician (1942–2008)

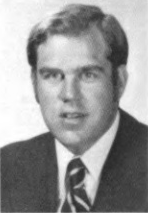

7th Majority Leader of the Michigan Senate
- In office 1975–1976
- Preceded by: Milton Zaagman
- Succeeded by: William Faust

Member of the Michigan Senate from the 1st district
- In office January 1, 1975 – December 31, 1978
- Preceded by: George S. Fitzgerald
- Succeeded by: John F. Kelly

Member of the Michigan House of Representatives
- In office March 1971 – December 31, 1974
- Preceded by: William B. Fitzgerald
- Succeeded by: Dennis Hertel
- Constituency: 4th district (1971–1972); 12th district (1973–1974)

Personal details
- Born: June 12, 1942 Detroit, Michigan, US
- Died: February 3, 2008 (aged 65)
- Party: Democratic
- Spouse: Margaret
- Education: Detroit College of Law; Western Michigan University
- Occupation: Attorney, politician

William B. Fitzgerald (June 12, 1942 - February 3, 2008) was an American attorney and Democratic politician who served in both houses of the Michigan Legislature and was Majority Leader of the Michigan Senate. He was later the Democratic nominee for governor in 1978 but lost to incumbent governor William Milliken.

== Early life ==
Born in Detroit in 1942, Fitzgerald graduated from Austin Catholic Prep School and earned his bachelor's degree at Western Michigan University where he played college basketball. He earned his J.D. at the Detroit College of Law and was a member of Sigma Alpha Epsilon. While at law school, he taught and coached basketball at St. Martin High School in Detroit, and after graduating, Fitzgerald practiced law in Detroit.

== Political career ==
Fitzgerald was elected to the Michigan House of Representatives in a March 1971 special election, succeeding his father, William B. Fitzgerald, who had died in office in December 1970. Four years later, he was elected to the Michigan Senate and was elected by his caucus to be majority leader before he had been formally sworn as a senator. He was, and remains, the youngest majority leader in state history. While majority leader, in the wake of the Watergate scandal, Fitzgerald advanced legislation creating new standards of disclosure of outside income by public officials, the state's first code of ethics in statute, and public disclosure of campaign expenses. Additionally, he helped create the state's first "rainy day fund."

In mid-1975, committees were formed to choose Fitzgerald as the Democratic nominee for Governor of Michigan in 1978, challenging William Milliken. He campaigned on economic development, political reform, and environmental standards, but lost to the incumbent by 13 points. He ran unsuccessfully for the Democratic gubernatorial nomination in 1982, but lost to eventual Governor James Blanchard.

== Later life ==
After his second bid for governor, Fitzgerald focused on his practice of law. He married Margaret O'Neill in 1986, and was named a distinguished alumnus by Western Michigan University.

Fitzgerald died in February 2008 from colon cancer, aged 65.

Party political offices
Preceded by Sander Levin	Democratic nominee for Governor of Michigan; 1978	Succeeded by James Blanchard
