= Sander Levin =

American politician (born 1931)

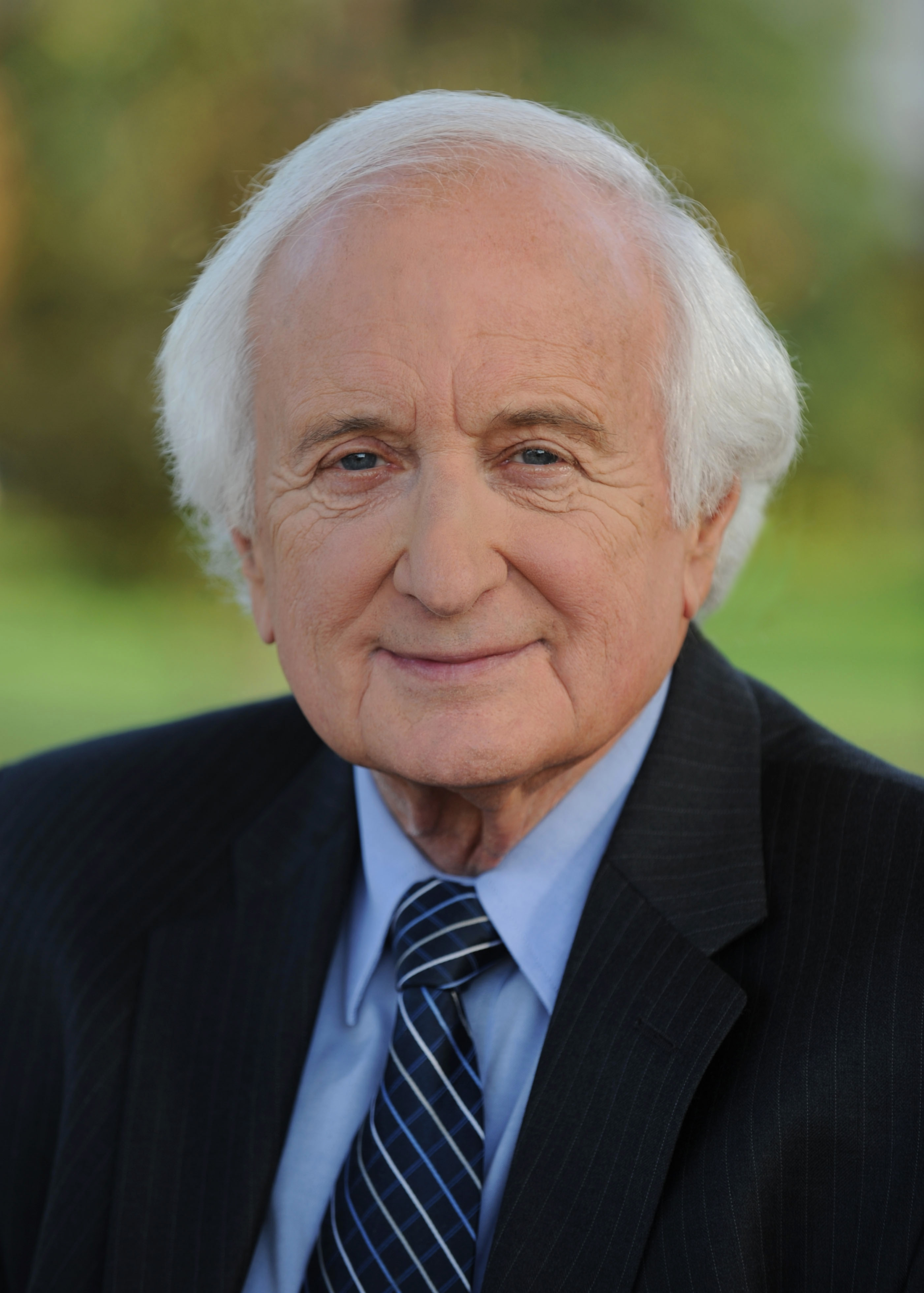
- Official portrait, 2009

Chair of the House Ways and Means Committee
- In office March 4, 2010 – January 3, 2011
- Preceded by: Pete Stark (acting)
- Succeeded by: Dave Camp

Member of the U.S. House of Representatives from Michigan
- In office January 3, 1983 – January 3, 2019
- Preceded by: William M. Brodhead
- Succeeded by: Andy Levin
- Constituency: 17th district (1983–1993); 12th district (1993–2013); 9th district (2013–2019)

Member of the Michigan Senate from the 15th district
- In office January 13, 1965 – January 13, 1971
- Preceded by: John Fitzgerald
- Succeeded by: Daniel Cooper

Personal details
- Born: Sander Martin Levin; September 6, 1931 (age 95) Detroit, Michigan, U.S.
- Party: Democratic
- Spouses: Vicki Schlafer (m. 1958; died 2008); Pamela Cole (m. 2012)
- Children: 4, including Andy
- Relatives: Carl Levin (brother)
- Education: University of Chicago (BA); Columbia University (MA); Harvard University (LLB)
- Levin's voice Levin on U.S. government leadership in the Bosnian War. Recorded May 6, 1993

Sander Martin Levin (born September 6, 1931) is an American politician who served in the United States House of Representatives from 1983 to 2019, representing Michigan's 9th congressional district (numbered as the 17th district from 1983 to 1993 and as the 12th district from 1993 to 2013). Levin, a member of the Democratic Party from Michigan, is a former ranking member on the House Ways and Means Committee; he was chair of the Ways and Means Committee from 2010 to 2011. He was the older brother of former U.S. Senator Carl Levin, and is the father of former Congressman Andy Levin, his successor.

In December 2017, Levin announced that he would retire from Congress at the end of his current term, and not seek re-election in 2018. His son Andy was elected on November 6, 2018, and took office in the 116th Congress, which commenced on January 3, 2019.

== Early life and education ==
Levin was born in Detroit, Michigan, the son of Jewish parents Bess Rachel (née Levinson) and Saul R. Levin. He graduated from Central High School in Detroit, received a bachelor's degree from the University of Chicago in 1952, a Master's degree in international relations from Columbia University in 1954, and a law degree from Harvard Law School in 1957. Afterwards, he developed a private practice in Detroit.

== State politics ==
Levin was named chairman of the Oakland County Democratic Party in 1962. He was elected as State Senator for the 15th district in 1964, defeating Republican George W. Kuhn. Levin served in the position until 1970. Following the 1967 resignation of Michigan Democratic Party chairman Zolton Ferency, Levin was elected state party chairman on December 17. He resigned his position as minority floor leader the following January. He served as Senate minority leader from January 1969 to January 1970, when he resigned to run for governor.

He made unsuccessful campaigns for Governor of Michigan in 1970 and 1974, both times losing to Republican William Milliken. He was a Fellow of the Harvard Kennedy School in 1975. From 1977 through 1981 he was assistant administrator of the Agency for International Development.

== U.S. House of Representatives ==
=== Elections ===
In 1982, incumbent Democratic U.S. Congressman William Brodhead decided not to run for re-election. Levin won the Democratic primary in Michigan's 17th congressional district with 49% of the vote, which at that time included northwestern Detroit as well as parts of Macomb and Oakland counties. Levin subsequently won this 1982 general election with 67% of the vote. He typically won re-election with at least 56% of the vote since then, exceptions being 1992 and 1994 elections. After the 1990 United States census, his district was renumbered as the 12th district and lost its share of Detroit. In 1992, he narrowly defeated businessman and Vietnam War veteran John Pappageorge 53%-46%. In a 1994 rematch, Levin again defeated this same opponent, during the midst of the Republican Revolution, 52%-47%. Then again in 1996, Levin defeated Pappageorge by a larger margin in a third rematch 57%-41%. In 1998, Levin won re-election against Republican nominee Leslie A. Touma, 56%-42%. In 2000, Detroit Metro area businessman Bart Baron gained the endorsement of the United Auto Workers Union, but Levin still managed to win re-election with 64% of the vote. The 2000s redistricting added heavily Democratic Southfield and Mount Clemens to the district, and he won re-election in every election with at least 61% of the vote since.

2012

After redistricting, Levin's district was merged with the 9th District of fellow Democrat Gary Peters. The district retained Peters' district number—the 9th—but geographically was more Levin's district. Peters opted to run in the newly redrawn 14th District. This effectively handed the Democratic nomination to Levin. While he lost Southfield to the 14th, it picked up the rest of Royal Oak, as well as Oak Park, Clawson and Berkley, among other locations. It was no less Democratic than its predecessor, and Levin breezed to a 16th term with 61.4 percent of the vote.

=== Committee assignments ===
- Committee on Ways and Means (former Ranking Member)
  - Subcommittee on Trade (Ranking Member)
  - Subcommittee on Income Security

Levin took over as chairman of the Ways and Means committee on March 4, 2010, when Charles B. Rangel of New York stepped aside in due to a number of ethics violations. Levin served as chairman until January 2011 and ranking member until the end of 2016.

Levin was a member of the House Baltic Caucus and the Congressional Arts Caucus.

== Political positions ==
=== Foreign policy ===
As a member of Congress, Levin was a supporter of Israel. He supported the nuclear deal with Iran, and said that Israel, the region, and the world would be more secure under the Iran nuclear deal.

== Personal life ==
His wife of 50 years, Vicki Schlafer, died on September 4, 2008. They had four children: Andy, Jennifer, Madeleine, and Matthew and ten grandchildren.

In a private ceremony in July 2012, Levin married Pamela Cole, age 61, a Pennsylvania State University psychology professor who studies emotional development. They met through his late wife Vicki. Cole and Levin worked to create a fund in her name for young professionals researching early childhood development.

Levin comes from a family that has long been prominent in Michigan politics. His younger brother Carl Levin was the state's senior Senator until his retirement in January 2015. His uncle, Theodore, was a federal judge. His first cousin Charles was a Michigan Supreme Court justice, after serving as a Michigan Court of Appeals judge. Another first cousin, Joseph Levin, was a candidate for the U.S. House of Representatives. His son Andy Levin was an unsuccessful candidate for the Michigan Senate in 2006, but in 2018 was elected to succeed him in the United States House of Representatives.

== Electoral history ==
Michigan's 17th congressional district: Results 1982–1990
Year	Democratic	Votes	%	Republican	Votes	%	Third party	Party	Votes	%
1982	Sander Levin	116,901	67%	Gerald Rosen	55,620	32%	Virginia Cropsey	Libertarian	2,955	2%
1984	Sander Levin (incumbent)	133,064	100%	No candidate						
1986	Sander Levin (incumbent)	105,031	76%	Calvin Williams	30,879	22%	Charles Martell	Independent	1,477	1%
1988	Sander Levin (incumbent)	135,493	70%	Dennis Flessland	55,197	29%	Charles Hahn	Libertarian	2,333	1%
1990	Sander Levin (incumbent)	92,205	70%	Blaine Lankford	40,100	30%				

Michigan's 12th congressional district: Results 1992–2010
Year	Democratic	Votes	%	Republican	Votes	%	Third party	Party	Votes	%	Third party	Party	Votes	%	Third party	Party	Votes	%	
1992	Sander Levin (incumbent)	137,514	53%	John Pappageorge	119,357	46%	Charles Hahn	Libertarian	2,751	1%	R. W. Montgomery	Natural Law	1,724	1%					
1994	Sander Levin (incumbent)	103,508	52%	John Pappageorge	92,762	47%	Jerome White	No party affiliation	1,386	1%	Eric Anderson	Natural Law	1,340	1%					
1996	Sander Levin (incumbent)	133,436	57%	John Pappageorge	94,235	41%	Albert Titran	Libertarian	3,101	1%	Gail Petrosoff	Natural Law	1,690	1%					
1998	Sander Levin (incumbent)	105,824	56%	Leslie Touma	79,619	42%	Albert Titran	Libertarian	2,813	1%	Fred Rosenberg	Natural Law	1,172	1%					
2000	Sander Levin (incumbent)	157,720	64%	Bart Baron	78,795	32%	Thomas Ness	Green	4,137	2%	Andrew LeCureaux	Libertarian	3,630	1%	Fred Rosenberg	Natural Law	887	0%	
2002	Sander Levin (incumbent)	140,970	68%	Harvey Dean	61,502	30%	Dick Gach	Libertarian	2,694	1%	Steven Revis	U.S. Taxpayers	1,362	1%					
2004	Sander Levin (incumbent)	210,827	69%	Randell Shafer	88,256	29%	Dick Gach	Libertarian	5,051	2%									
2006	Sander Levin (incumbent)	168,494	71%	Randell Shafer	62,689	26%	Andrew LeCureaux	Libertarian	3,259	1%	Jerome White	No party affiliation	1,862	1%	Art Myatt	Green	1,735	1%	
2008	Sander Levin (incumbent)	225,094	72%	Bert Copple	74,565	24%	John Vico	Libertarian	4,767	2%	Les Townsend	U.S. Taxpayers	4,076	1%	William Opalicky	Green	3,842	1%	
2010	Sander Levin (incumbent)	124,671	61%	Don Volaric	71,372	35%	Julia Williams	Green	3,038	1%	Leonard Schwartz	Libertarian	2,342	1%	Les Townsend	U.S. Taxpayers	2,285	1%	*

Michigan's 9th congressional district: Results 2012–
Year	Democratic	Votes	%	Republican	Votes	%	Third party	Party	Votes	%	Third party	Party	Votes	%	Third party	Party	Votes	%
2012	Sander Levin (incumbent)	208,846	62%	Don Volaric	114,760	34%	Jim Fulner	Libertarian	6,100	2%	Julia Williams	Green	4,708	1%	Les Townsend	U.S. Taxpayers	2,902	1%
2014	Sander Levin (incumbent)	136,342	60%	George Brikho	81,470	36%	Gregory Creswell	Libertarian	4,792	2%	John McDermott	Green	3,153	1%				
2016	Sander Levin (incumbent)	199,661	58%	Christopher Morse	128,937	37%	Matthew Orlando	Libertarian	9,563	3%	John McDermott	Green	6,614	2%				

== See also ==
- List of Jewish members of the United States Congress

Party political offices
Preceded by Zolton Ferency	Democratic nominee for Governor of Michigan; 1970, 1974	Succeeded by William B. Fitzgerald Jr.
U.S. House of Representatives
Preceded by William M. Brodhead	Member of the U.S. House of Representatives from Michigan's 17th congressional district 1983–1993	Constituency abolished
Preceded by David E. Bonior	Member of the U.S. House of Representatives from Michigan's 12th congressional district 1993–2013	Succeeded by John Dingell
Preceded by Chuck Hagel	Chair of the Joint China Commission; 2007–2009	Succeeded by Byron Dorgan
Preceded by Pete Stark; Acting	Chair of the House Ways and Means Committee; 2010–2011	Succeeded by Dave Camp
Preceded by Dave Camp	Ranking Member of the House Ways and Means Committee; 2011–2017	Succeeded by Richard Neal
Preceded by Gary Peters	Member of the U.S. House of Representatives from Michigan's 9th congressional district 2013–2019	Succeeded by Andy Levin
U.S. order of precedence (ceremonial)
Preceded by Pete Visclosky as Former U.S. Representative	Order of precedence of the United States as Former U.S. Representative	Succeeded by Fred Upton as Former U.S. Representative
