= Zolton Ferency =

American politician (1922–1993)

- Ferency in 1978

Member of the East Lansing City Council
- In office 1991 – March 23, 1993

Member of the Ingham County Board of Commissioners
- In office 1981–1982

Personal details
- Born: June 30, 1922 Detroit, Michigan, U.S.
- Died: March 23, 1993 (aged 70) Lansing, Michigan, U.S.
- Party: Democratic Party (before 1970, after 1976); Human Rights Party (1970–1976)
- Other political affiliations: Democratic Socialists of America

Zolton Anton Ferency (June 30, 1922 – March 23, 1993) was an American lawyer, political activist and professor of Criminal Justice at Michigan State University (MSU).

== Biography ==
Ferency was born in Detroit, Michigan, in a Hungarian-American family. He served in World War II, and graduated from Michigan State University and the Detroit College of Law.

Ferency was a three-time chairman of the Michigan Democratic Party serving from 1963 to 1968. He was an unsuccessful Democratic candidate for Governor of Michigan in 1966, when he was defeated, as expected, by George W. Romney. He also served as first President of the Human Rights Party, which he helped found in 1970 after breaking with the Democratic Party over its support for the Vietnam War. He rejoined the Democrats in 1976. He was also a member of the Democratic Socialists of America.

Ferency was elected to the Ingham County Board of Commissioners in 1980, and to the East Lansing City Council in 1991. He was serving on the city council at his death. He was a frequent if unsuccessful candidate for other public offices, running for governor in 1966, 1970, 1974, 1978, and 1982; for Justice of the Michigan Supreme Court in 1972, 1976, and 1986; and for the Michigan Senate, 24th District, in 1990.

Ferency taught criminal justice at MSU from 1971 until his retirement in 1990.

Ferency lived in East Lansing, Michigan. He died on March 23, 1993, in Lansing, Michigan.

The Ferency House in the Michigan State University Student Housing Cooperative and the Zolton Ferency Endowed Scholarship at MSU commemorate Ferency.

Party political offices
Preceded by Neil Staebler	Democratic nominee for Governor of Michigan; 1966	Succeeded by Sander Levin
