= 1970 Michigan gubernatorial election =

- November 3, 1970
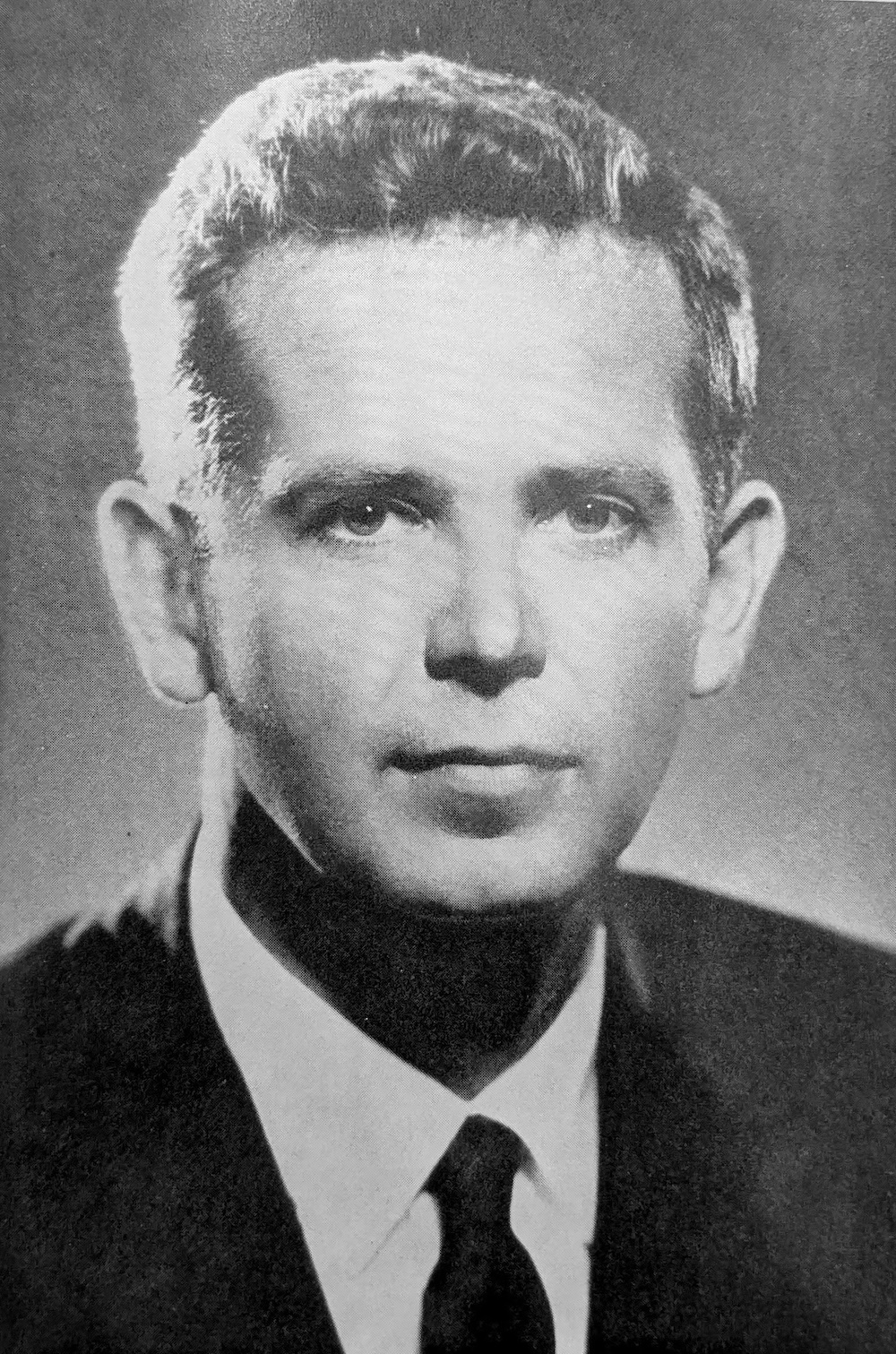

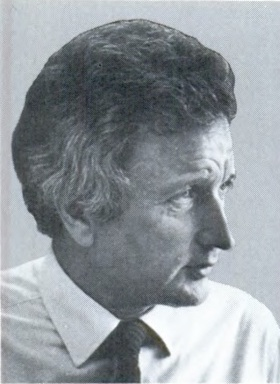
Nominee	William Milliken	Sander Levin
Party	Republican	Democratic
Running mate	James H. Brickley	Edward H. McNamara
Popular vote	1,339,047	1,294,638
Percentage	50.41%	48.74%
- County results Milliken: 40–50% 50–60% 60–70% Levin: 40–50% 50–60% 60–70%
Governor before election
William Milliken
Republican
Governor
William Milliken
Republican

The 1970 Michigan gubernatorial election was held on November 3, 1970. Republican William Milliken won the election, defeating Democratic nominee Sander Levin.

== Primary election ==
Michigan held primary elections on August 4, 1970.

=== Republican party ===
After George W. Romney resigned in 1969 to become Secretary of Housing and Urban Development, lieutenant governor William Milliken succeeded him as governor. Milliken sought a full term in 1970 was easily won the Republican nomination

==== Candidates ====
- William Milliken, incumbent governor
- James C. Turner, publisher from Howell

==== Results ====
Republican primary results
Party	Candidate	Votes	%
Republican	William Milliken (inc.)	416,491	77.75%
Republican	James C. Turner	119,140	22.24%
Republican	Scattering	25	0.01%
Total votes		535,656	100.00%

=== Democratic party ===
State senator Sander Levin defeated Zolton Ferency for the Democratic nomination.

==== Candidates ====
- Zolton Ferency, Democratic nominee for governor in 1966
- Sander Levin, member of Michigan Senate
- George Montgomery, majority leader of the Michigan House of Representatives
- George Parris, Macomb County Prosecutor

==== Results ====
Democratic primary results
Party	Candidate	Votes	%
Democratic	Sander Levin	304,343	54.10%
Democratic	Zolton Ferency	167,442	29.76%
Democratic	George Parris	49,559	8.81%
Democratic	George Montgomery	41,218	7.33%
Democratic	Scattering	17	0.00%
Total votes		562,579	100.00%

=== American Independent party ===
==== Candidates ====
- James L. McCormick

==== Results ====
American Independent primary
Party	Candidate	Votes	%
American Independent	James L. McCormick	100	82.64%
American Independent	Scattering	21	17.36%
Total votes		121	100.00%

== General election ==
=== Candidates ===
Major party candidates

- William G. Milliken & James H. Brickley, Republican
- Sander M. Levin & Edward H. McNamara, Democratic

Other candidates

- James L. McCormick & Robert E. Cauley, American Independent
- George Bouse & Evelyn Kirsch, Socialist Workers
- James Horvath & W. Clifford Bentley, Socialist Labor

=== Results ===
1970 Michigan gubernatorial election
Party	Candidate	Votes	%	±%
Republican	William Milliken (inc.)	1,339,047	50.41%	−10.13%
Democratic	Sander Levin	1,294,638	48.74%	+9.61%
American Independent	James L. McCormick	18,006	0.68%	
Socialist Workers	George Bouse	2,220	0.08%	
Socialist Labor	James Horvath	2,144	0.08%	−0.24%
	Scattering	107	0.00%	
Majority		44,409	1.67%	
Total votes		2,656,162	100.00%	
Republican hold		Swing	-19.74%	

==== Results by county ====
Arenac County, Ogemaw County, and Shiawassee County voted Democratic for the first time since 1932.

County	William Milliken Republican		Sander Levin Democratic		James L. McCormick American Independent		All Others Various		Margin		Total votes cast
County	#	%	#	%	#	%	#	%	#	%	Total votes cast
Alcona	1,708	57.61%	1,239	41.79%	17	0.57%	1	0.03%	469	15.82%	2,965
Alger	1,172	39.49%	1,791	60.34%	5	0.17%	0	0.00%	-619	-20.86%	2,968
Allegan	12,202	60.55%	7,771	38.56%	161	0.80%	17	0.08%	4,431	21.99%	20,151
Alpena	4,884	53.55%	4,169	45.71%	56	0.61%	11	0.12%	715	7.84%	9,120
Antrim	2,857	59.66%	1,903	39.74%	26	0.54%	3	0.06%	954	19.92%	4,789
Arenac	1,731	49.64%	1,751	50.22%	4	0.11%	1	0.03%	-20	-0.57%	3,487
Baraga	1,247	44.14%	1,559	55.19%	8	0.28%	11	0.39%	-312	-11.04%	2,825
Barry	6,514	53.34%	5,596	45.82%	88	0.72%	15	0.12%	918	7.52%	12,213
Bay	17,591	46.18%	20,275	53.23%	180	0.47%	43	0.11%	-2,684	-7.05%	38,089
Benzie	1,774	58.72%	1,218	40.32%	25	0.83%	4	0.13%	556	18.40%	3,021
Berrien	25,899	57.93%	18,307	40.95%	436	0.98%	68	0.15%	7,592	16.98%	44,710
Branch	5,524	55.80%	4,311	43.55%	56	0.57%	9	0.09%	1,213	12.25%	9,900
Calhoun	22,116	52.04%	19,980	47.01%	347	0.82%	58	0.14%	2,136	5.03%	42,501
Cass	5,494	51.17%	5,107	47.57%	119	1.11%	16	0.15%	387	3.60%	10,736
Charlevoix	3,210	55.33%	2,570	44.30%	18	0.31%	4	0.07%	640	11.03%	5,802
Cheboygan	3,068	53.08%	2,671	46.21%	35	0.61%	6	0.10%	397	6.87%	5,780
Chippewa	5,021	58.28%	3,519	40.84%	69	0.80%	7	0.08%	1,502	17.43%	8,616
Clare	2,537	51.40%	2,366	47.93%	32	0.65%	1	0.02%	171	3.46%	4,936
Clinton	7,981	54.65%	6,505	44.54%	108	0.74%	10	0.07%	1,476	10.11%	14,604
Crawford	1,163	55.73%	916	43.89%	8	0.38%	0	0.00%	247	11.84%	2,087
Delta	5,030	41.45%	7,036	57.98%	58	0.48%	11	0.09%	-2,006	-16.53%	12,135
Dickinson	4,364	47.25%	4,831	52.31%	32	0.35%	9	0.10%	-467	-5.06%	9,236
Eaton	12,215	56.61%	9,191	42.60%	138	0.64%	33	0.15%	3,024	14.01%	21,577
Emmet	3,503	55.86%	2,744	43.76%	19	0.30%	5	0.08%	759	12.10%	6,271
Genesee	54,920	42.71%	72,185	56.14%	1,295	1.01%	177	0.14%	-17,265	-13.43%	128,577
Gladwin	2,164	50.81%	2,077	48.77%	15	0.35%	3	0.07%	87	2.04%	4,259
Gogebic	3,565	39.82%	5,352	59.78%	30	0.34%	6	0.07%	-1,787	-19.96%	8,953
Grand Traverse	8,713	68.07%	3,959	30.93%	125	0.98%	3	0.02%	4,754	37.14%	12,800
Gratiot	5,781	54.63%	4,752	44.91%	44	0.42%	5	0.05%	1,029	9.72%	10,582
Hillsdale	5,946	57.76%	4,237	41.16%	95	0.92%	17	0.17%	1,709	16.60%	10,295
Houghton	5,954	50.70%	5,735	48.84%	48	0.41%	6	0.05%	219	1.86%	11,743
Huron	6,971	61.27%	4,327	38.03%	69	0.61%	10	0.09%	2,644	23.24%	11,377
Ingham	43,911	56.32%	33,520	42.99%	367	0.47%	170	0.22%	10,391	13.33%	77,968
Ionia	7,270	53.94%	6,137	45.54%	58	0.43%	12	0.09%	1,133	8.41%	13,477
Iosco	3,227	54.53%	2,658	44.91%	32	0.54%	1	0.02%	569	9.61%	5,918
Iron	2,681	43.29%	3,500	56.52%	6	0.10%	6	0.10%	-819	-13.22%	6,193
Isabella	6,007	56.45%	4,557	42.82%	66	0.62%	11	0.10%	1,450	13.63%	10,641
Jackson	23,000	54.51%	18,901	44.80%	256	0.61%	34	0.08%	4,099	9.72%	42,191
Kalamazoo	35,430	58.81%	24,292	40.32%	433	0.72%	94	0.16%	11,138	18.49%	60,249
Kalkaska	1,065	52.80%	918	45.51%	32	1.59%	2	0.10%	147	7.29%	2,017
Kent	79,459	59.99%	51,800	39.11%	1,052	0.79%	137	0.10%	27,659	20.88%	132,448
Keweenaw	496	50.25%	488	49.44%	3	0.30%	0	0.00%	8	0.81%	987
Lake	1,043	42.97%	1,373	56.57%	8	0.33%	3	0.12%	-330	-13.60%	2,427
Lapeer	6,591	52.39%	5,882	46.76%	96	0.76%	11	0.09%	709	5.64%	12,580
Leelanau	2,814	67.76%	1,300	31.30%	38	0.92%	1	0.02%	1,514	36.46%	4,153
Lenawee	13,406	59.40%	8,999	39.88%	145	0.64%	18	0.08%	4,407	19.53%	22,568
Livingston	10,103	58.43%	6,956	40.23%	215	1.24%	16	0.09%	3,147	18.20%	17,290
Luce	1,098	58.10%	782	41.38%	9	0.48%	1	0.05%	316	16.72%	1,890
Mackinac	2,161	57.77%	1,560	41.70%	13	0.35%	7	0.19%	601	16.07%	3,741
Macomb	82,664	46.01%	94,910	52.82%	1,814	1.01%	291	0.16%	-12,246	-6.82%	179,679
Manistee	3,898	52.81%	3,445	46.67%	36	0.49%	2	0.03%	453	6.14%	7,381
Marquette	7,508	42.51%	10,056	56.94%	87	0.49%	11	0.06%	-2,548	-14.43%	17,662
Mason	4,129	52.86%	3,640	46.60%	30	0.38%	12	0.15%	489	6.26%	7,811
Mecosta	3,858	57.21%	2,834	42.02%	47	0.70%	5	0.07%	1,024	15.18%	6,744
Menominee	4,050	48.36%	4,279	51.09%	41	0.49%	5	0.06%	-229	-2.73%	8,375
Midland	11,542	57.82%	8,271	41.43%	128	0.64%	21	0.11%	3,271	16.39%	19,962
Missaukee	1,772	64.39%	949	34.48%	30	1.09%	1	0.04%	823	29.91%	2,752
Monroe	15,547	50.63%	14,872	48.43%	244	0.79%	43	0.14%	675	2.20%	30,706
Montcalm	6,352	53.05%	5,527	46.16%	73	0.61%	21	0.18%	825	6.89%	11,973
Montmorency	1,063	53.90%	893	45.28%	15	0.76%	1	0.05%	170	8.62%	1,972
Muskegon	23,958	49.91%	23,425	48.80%	530	1.10%	85	0.18%	533	1.11%	47,998
Newaygo	5,081	55.03%	4,069	44.07%	72	0.78%	11	0.12%	1,012	10.96%	9,233
Oakland	157,225	54.93%	126,261	44.11%	2,323	0.81%	432	0.15%	30,964	10.82%	286,241
Oceana	2,990	51.22%	2,813	48.19%	33	0.57%	1	0.02%	177	3.03%	5,837
Ogemaw	2,072	49.84%	2,075	49.92%	10	0.24%	0	0.00%	-3	-0.07%	4,157
Ontonagon	1,843	44.24%	2,311	55.47%	10	0.24%	2	0.05%	-468	-11.23%	4,166
Osceola	3,031	63.33%	1,710	35.73%	45	0.94%	0	0.00%	1,321	27.60%	4,786
Oscoda	829	59.26%	562	40.17%	8	0.57%	0	0.00%	267	19.09%	1,399
Otsego	1,928	55.37%	1,537	44.14%	13	0.37%	4	0.11%	391	11.23%	3,482
Ottawa	28,396	65.78%	14,470	33.52%	262	0.61%	42	0.10%	13,926	32.26%	43,170
Presque Isle	2,396	50.83%	2,304	48.88%	14	0.30%	0	0.00%	92	1.95%	4,714
Roscommon	2,337	54.55%	1,920	44.82%	26	0.61%	1	0.02%	417	9.73%	4,284
Saginaw	32,786	52.82%	28,887	46.54%	333	0.54%	63	0.10%	3,899	6.28%	62,069
Sanilac	7,460	64.45%	4,035	34.86%	70	0.60%	10	0.09%	3,425	29.59%	11,575
Schoolcraft	1,531	46.06%	1,771	53.28%	17	0.51%	5	0.15%	-240	-7.22%	3,324
Shiawassee	9,098	47.79%	9,760	51.26%	162	0.85%	19	0.10%	-662	-3.48%	19,039
St. Clair	19,434	53.25%	16,743	45.88%	279	0.76%	38	0.10%	2,691	7.37%	36,494
St. Joseph	7,729	59.60%	5,114	39.43%	111	0.86%	15	0.12%	2,615	20.16%	12,969
Tuscola	7,545	55.17%	6,052	44.25%	71	0.52%	8	0.06%	1,493	10.92%	13,676
Van Buren	8,680	54.71%	7,016	44.22%	143	0.90%	26	0.16%	1,664	10.49%	15,865
Washtenaw	37,920	58.14%	26,590	40.77%	484	0.74%	227	0.35%	11,330	17.37%	65,221
Wayne	336,185	43.04%	439,223	56.23%	3,802	0.49%	1,971	0.25%	-103,038	-13.19%	781,181
Wexford	3,629	56.51%	2,741	42.68%	48	0.75%	4	0.06%	888	13.83%	6,422
Total	1,339,047	50.41%	1,294,638	48.74%	18,006	0.68%	4,471	0.17%	44,409	1.67%	2,656,162

===== Counties that flipped from Democratic to Republican =====
- Keweenaw

===== Counties that flipped from Republican to Democratic =====
- Alger
- Arenac
- Baraga
- Bay
- Delta
- Dickinson
- Genesee
- Gogebic
- Iron
- Lake
- Macomb
- Marquette
- Menominee
- Ogemaw
- Ontonagon
- Schoolcraft
- Shiawassee
