= William Lucas (Michigan politician) =

American politician (1928–2022)

Bill Lucas

Executive of Wayne County
- In office 1983–1987
- Preceded by: Position established
- Succeeded by: Edward H. McNamara

Sheriff of Wayne County
- In office 1969–1983
- Preceded by: Roman Gribbs
- Succeeded by: Robert A. Ficano

Personal details
- Born: January 15, 1928 New York City, U.S.
- Died: May 30, 2022 (aged 94) Detroit, Michigan, U.S.
- Party: Democratic (Before 1985); Republican (1985–2022)
- Education: Manhattan College (BS); Fordham University (JD)

William Lucas (January 15, 1928 – May 30, 2022) was an American politician.

When he was orphaned in his early teens (his West Indian immigrant parents died within a year of each other), he went to live with and was raised by an aunt. He attended Morris High School in the Bronx, and starred on the school track team. Because of his track skill he was offered a number of collegiate athletic scholarships, and accepted one from Manhattan College. He was the first in his family to go to college, and graduated with honors in 1952 with a Bachelor of Science degree.

After graduation, Lucas spent several years as a teacher and welfare case worker in New York City. In 1953 he joined the New York Police Department, where he remained for nine years, often working undercover in Harlem. From his experiences with the city legal system he decided to become a lawyer, and attended Fordham University at night. He received his Juris Doctor degree in 1962, and at the graduation ceremony, he was an escort for the speaker, Robert Kennedy, who offered him a job in the Justice Department. Lucas accepted and spent two years as an investigator in the civil rights division. He then joined the Federal Bureau of Investigation as a special agent, stationed first in Cincinnati, and later in Detroit. He left the bureau in 1967 to become Wayne County undersheriff, and two years later was appointed Wayne County sheriff when Roman Gribbs vacated the position after winning election as mayor of Detroit. Lucas was elected Wayne County sheriff in his own right in 1970 and reelected twice thereafter, serving in that capacity for thirteen years. In 1982, he ran successfully for the newly created office of Wayne County Executive. He served for four years as the chief executive officer of the third largest county in the United States.

Explaining that he was dismayed by the influence of special interests in the Democratic party, Lucas switched political affiliation to the Republican party in May 1985. He won the Republican gubernatorial primary in 1986, only the second Black person in American history to win a major party nomination for governor. He ran on a platform that stressed the historic nature of his candidacy, fiscal responsibility, and law and order, but lost by a large margin in the general election to the incumbent Democrat, James Blanchard. Lucas only carried one county in the state, Ottawa County.

Lucas made an unsuccessful run for Wayne County Sheriff in 2004.

Lucas died in Detroit on May 30, 2022, at the age of 94.

Party political offices
Preceded by Richard Headlee	Republican nominee for Governor of Michigan; 1986	Succeeded by John Engler
