= Thomas F. Schweigert =

American politician (1917–2001)

Thomas Schweigert
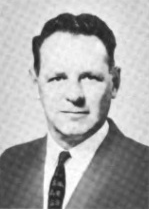

55th Lieutenant Governor of Michigan
- Acting
- In office 1970–1971
- Governor: William G. Milliken
- Preceded by: William G. Milliken
- Succeeded by: James H. Brickley

Member of the Michigan Senate from the 37th district
- In office January 1, 1961 – December 31, 1970
- Preceded by: Frank Andrews
- Succeeded by: Robert William Davis
- Constituency: 29th district (1961–1964)

Personal details
- Born: September 29, 1917 Detroit, Michigan, U.S.
- Died: July 9, 2001 (aged 83) Petoskey, Michigan, U.S.
- Party: Republican
- Spouse: Peggy
- Children: 3
- Education: Michigan State University (BS)

Military service
- Branch/service: United States Army
- Battles/wars: World War II

Thomas F. Schweigert (September 29, 1917 – July 9, 2001) was an American politician who served as a member of the Michigan Senate and as acting lieutenant governor of Michigan.

== Early life and education ==
Born in Detroit, Michigan, Schweigert attended Highland Park Community High School. He graduated from Michigan State University with a degree in forestry.

== Career ==
Schweigert began his career United States Forest Service before founding a private forestry management company. He served in the United States Army during World War II.

He served on the Emmet County, Michigan Board of Commissioners. Schweigert then served in the Michigan State Senate from 1961 to 1971 as a Republican. Schweigert was President of the Michigan Senate and acting lieutenant governor of Michigan in 1969, serving under Governor William G. Milliken.

== Personal life ==
Schweigert and his wife, Peggy, had three children. He was a member of the Church of Christ, Scientist. Schweigert died in Petoskey, Michigan.

Political offices
Preceded by William G. Milliken	Lieutenant Governor of Michigan; 1970	Succeeded by James H. Brickley
