= Edward H. McNamara =

American politician

Wayne County Executive
- In office 1987–2002
- Preceded by: William Lucas
- Succeeded by: Robert A. Ficano

Mayor of Livonia
- In office 1970–1986
- Preceded by: Harvey W. Moelke
- Succeeded by: Robert McCann

Personal details
- Born: Edward Howard McNamara; September 21, 1926
- Died: February 19, 2006 (aged 79) Detroit, Michigan, U.S.
- Party: Democratic

Edward Howard McNamara (September 21, 1926 – February 19, 2006) was an American politician who served as the county executive of Wayne County, Michigan from 1987 until 2002. A member of the Democratic Party, McNamara previously served as the mayor of Livonia, Michigan from 1970 until 1986, and as a member of the Livonia City Council from 1962 until 1970.

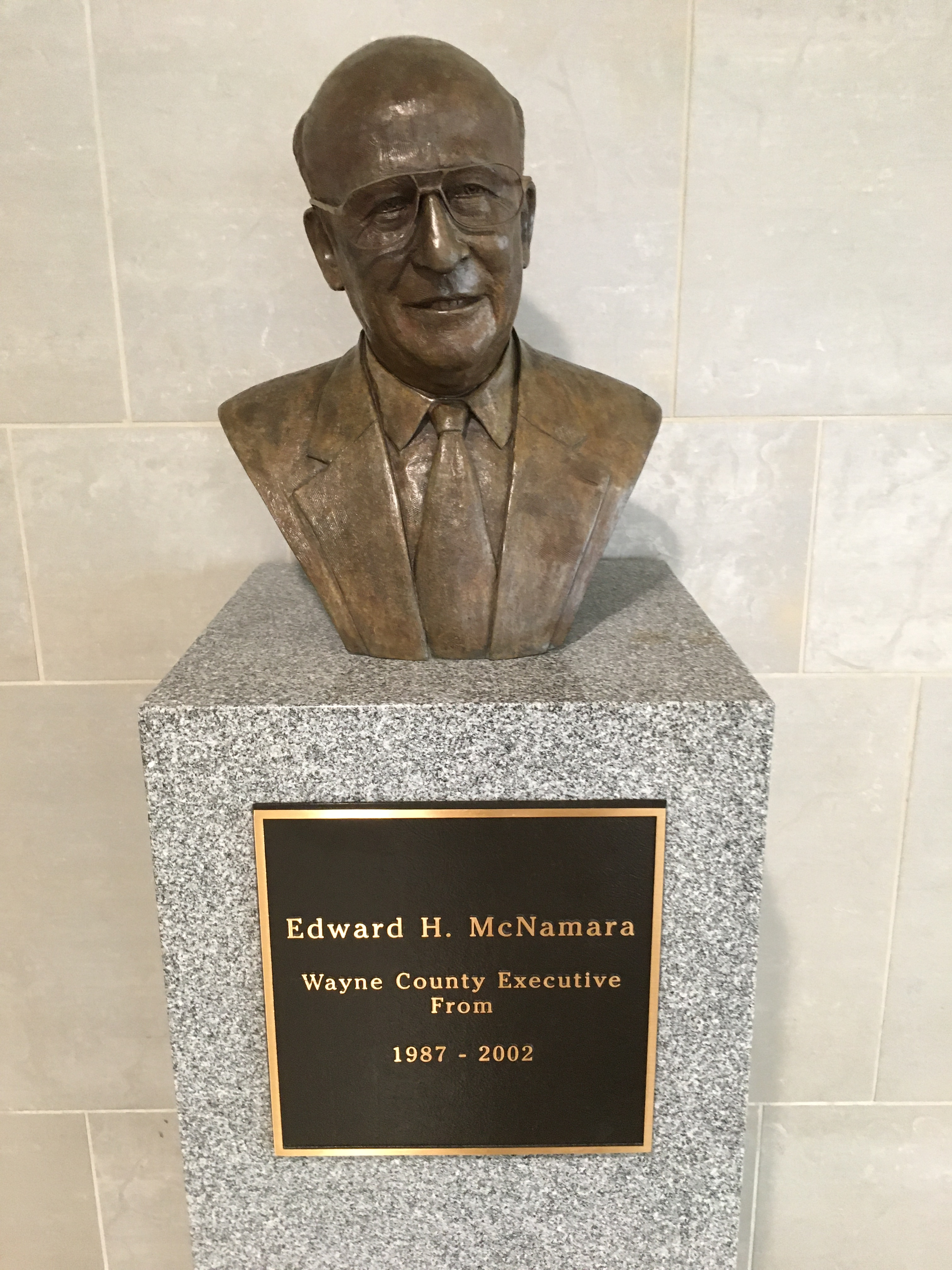
Bust of McNamara in the McNamara Terminal at Detroit Metropolitan Airport

McNamara was mentor to many leading Democrats, including Gov. Jennifer Granholm, who was Wayne County corporation Counsel under McNamara, prior to becoming Michigan Attorney General and later being elected as Michigan Governor. McNamara also played a key role helping the election campaign of Kwame Kilpatrick for mayor of Detroit in 2001, whose father, Bernard Kilpatrick, was McNamara's Chief of Staff while county executive.

He is probably best known for overseeing the $1.6 billion expansion of Detroit Metropolitan Wayne County Airport. The expansion included two new runways and the new Edward H. McNamara Terminal, which was named in his honor.

McNamara died on February 19, 2006.

Party political offices
Preceded by John B. Bruff	Democratic nominee for Lieutenant Governor of Michigan; 1970	Succeeded by Paul W. Brown
