= Richard Headlee =

American Mormon bishop and politician

- Born: May 16, 1930; Fort Dodge, Iowa, U.S.
- Died: November 9, 2004 (aged 74); Cedar Hills, Utah, U.S.
- Known for: Republican nominee for Governor of Michigan; Headlee Amendment

Richard Harold Headlee (May 16, 1930 – November 9, 2004) was an American businessman and politician from Michigan. He was the unsuccessful Republican nominee for Governor of Michigan in the 1982 election. He was also known as the author of the Headlee Amendment, which requires voters' approval for many tax increases in Michigan.

== Early life ==
Headlee was born in Fort Dodge, Iowa, to William Clark and Violet Lunn Headlee and grew up in Richfield, Utah. He graduated from Utah State University in 1953.

After graduating from college, Headlee joined the US military and was stationed in Mannheim, Germany. He then went to Bountiful, Utah, where he joined the Jaycees and eventually became its national president in 1963.

== Political career ==
In 1964, Headlee moved to Michigan. That year, he was appointed by Governor George Romney to run a program for Michigan servicemen in Vietnam. In 1966, Headlee served as Romney's campaign manager and the same year he was baptized as a member of the Church of Jesus Christ of Latter-day Saints and was sealed to his wife, a lifelong church member, and his children in 1967 in the Salt Lake Temple.

Headlee continued working in various positions largely on Romney's presidential campaign until 1968.

In 1978, Headlee organized the effort that brought about the Headlee Amendment. This was an amendment to the Michigan Constitution that made most local tax increases subject to local voter approval and banned the state government imposing unfunded mandates on local governments. The amendment also requires that almost half of all taxes the state collects be sent to local governments. The Headlee Admentment also limits state revenue in Michigan to no more than 9.5% of total personal income in the state.

This amendment was an outgrowth of his heading Taxpayer United, a Michigan tax limitation campaign. Headlee had come to the leadership of this group shortly after their attempt to pass a tax limiting provision failed in 1976.

In 1980 he was appointed chair of the Board of Trustees of Oakland University. In this position he was a supporter of the Tisch Amendment, which would have rolled back statewide taxes in Michigan and made increasing them subject to voter approval.

Headlee was The Republican candidate for governor of Michigan in 1982, he lost to James Blanchard. Some consider this a result of his views on the Equal Rights Amendment. Others believe some voters may have resented Headlee's anti-tax policies.

In 1985 Headlee was a key figure in recruiting Wayne County Executive Bill Lucas to be a Republican. Lucas was the Republican candidate for governor of Michigan in 1986.

Headlee continued to work with tax limitation groups throughout the 1980s. In 1979 Taxpayers United had merged with the Taxpayer Federation of Michigan to become the Taxpayers United Federation. Headlee remained very active with this group. In the early 1990s this group authored a new provision the Headlee Initiative which limited to the growth of state spending to the rate of inflation. This was opposed by the governor and state legislature who got the state board of canvassers to throw it out on the grounds too many of the petition signatures were invalid. Headlee and his associates went to court and were able to get the initiative reinstated, and it passed in 1992. Headlee was also one of the advocates of the successful 1992 drive to enact term limits for all state level elected officials in Michigan, both in the executive and the legislative branch.

== Business career ==
After his time as an army officer from 1953 to 1956 Headlee joined Burroughs Corporation in the marketing division. In 1968 he became president of Morbark Industries, a small industrial firm, shortly after leaving the campaign of George Romney. He also became affiliated with Alexander Hamilton Life Insurance that year. He became president and CEO of Alexander Hamilton Life in 1972.

== Later life ==
In 1987, Headlee was the recipient of a heart transplant from a victim of a motorcycle accident in Texas.

In the LDS Church, Headlee served twice as a bishop, ten years in a stake presidency and as a Regional Representative.

Headlee was anti-taxes and anti-abortion.

Headlee funded the creation by Dennis Smith and placement of the "Signing of the Constitution" statues in the US embassies in Moscow and London in 1988.

In 1992, Headlee his children and grandchildren were involved in a major effort to assist children in Romanian orphanages. This was organized into Project Concern International, which provided 40,000 pounds of supplies to an orphanage in Romania.

After retiring and moving to Park City, Utah, to be near his grandchildren Headlee served as the director of the board of Tuacahn Center for the Arts in Ivins, Utah. He died at his home in Cedar Hills, Utah, in 2004. On the occasion of his death he was memorialized as a "giant in Michigan History" by the conservative Mackinac Center for Public Policy.

== Personal life ==
In 1949 Headlee married his high school sweetheart, Mary Elaine Mendenhall. They had four sons and five daughters, among them Howard Headlee, President of the Utah Bankers Association.

Party political offices
Preceded by William Milliken	Republican nominee for Governor of Michigan; 1982	Succeeded by William Lucas
