= 1978 Michigan gubernatorial election =

- November 7, 1978
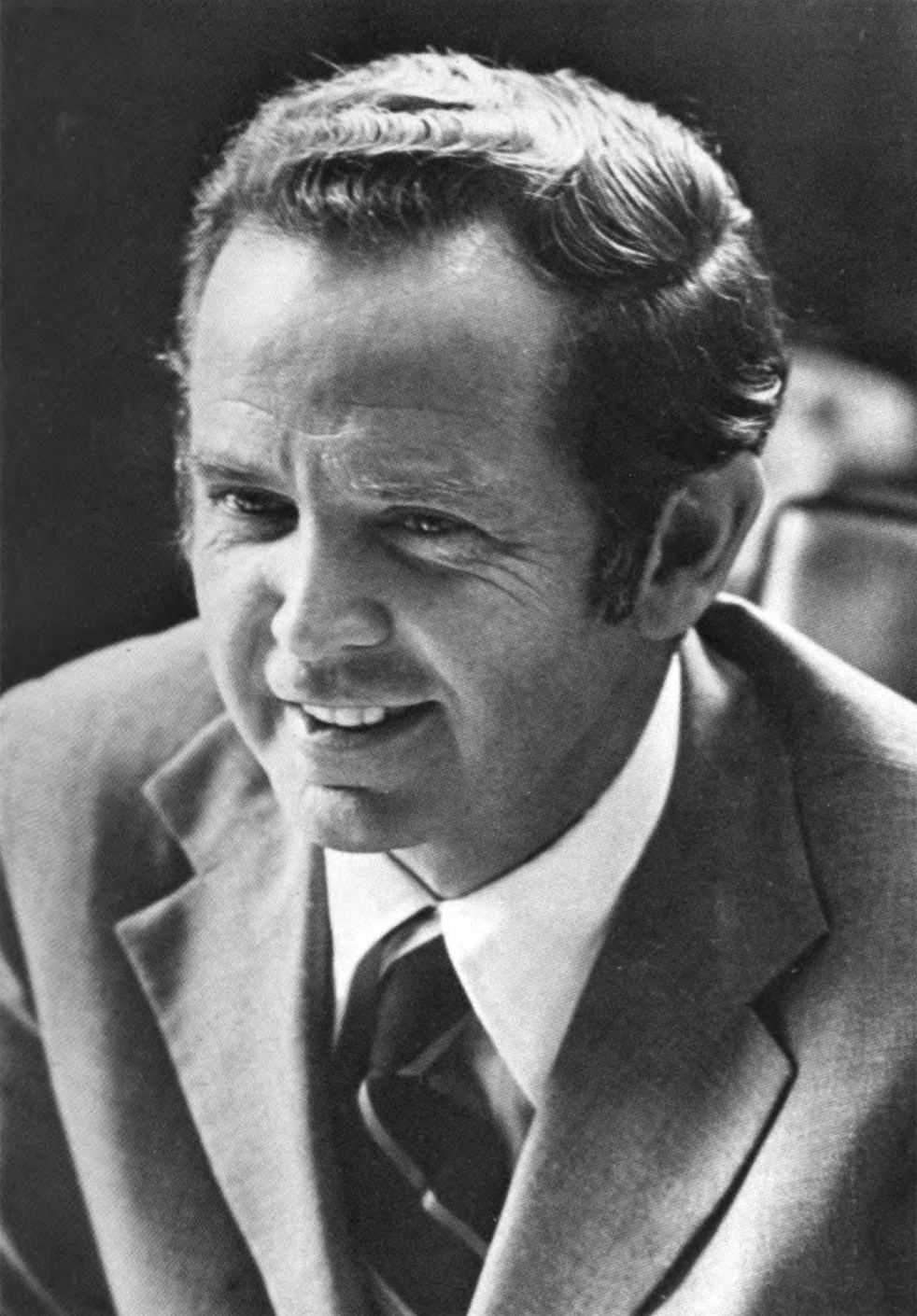

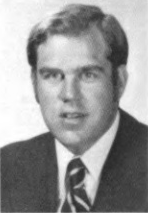
Nominee	William Milliken	William B. Fitzgerald
Party	Republican	Democratic
Running mate	James H. Brickley	Olivia P. Maynard
Popular vote	1,628,485	1,237,256
Percentage	56.80%	43.15%
- County results Milliken: 50–60% 60–70% 70–80% Fitzgerald: 40–50% 50–60% 60–70% 70–80%
Governor before election
William Milliken
Republican
Elected Governor
William Milliken
Republican

The 1978 Michigan gubernatorial election was held on November 7, 1978. Incumbent Republican William Milliken defeated Democrat William B. Fitzgerald to win a third full term as governor.

As of 2026, this is the most recent gubernatorial election in which Wayne County has voted Republican and one of only two such instances since 1928. (Note: The other time Wayne County voted Republican was in 1946.)

== Primary election ==
Michigan held primary elections on August 8, 1978.

=== Republican party ===
Incumbent governor William Milliken was unopposed for the Republican nomination.

==== Candidates ====
- William Milliken, incumbent Governor

==== Results ====
Republican primary results
Party	Candidate	Votes	%
Republican	William Milliken (inc.)	393,010	99.98%
Republican	Scattering	89	0.02%
Total votes		393,099	100.00%

=== Democratic party ===
State senator William B. Fitzgerald defeated three other candidates including law professor and perennial candidate Zolton Ferency.

==== Candidates ====
- Zolton Ferency, Michigan State University law professor and Democratic nominee in 1966
- William B. Fitzgerald, member of Michigan Senate and former Senate Majority Leader
- Patrick McCollough, member of Michigan Senate
- William Ralls, former member of Michigan Public Service Commission

==== Results ====
Democratic primary results
Party	Candidate	Votes	%
Democratic	William B. Fitzgerald	240,641	39.79%
Democratic	Zolton Ferency	151,062	24.97%
Democratic	Patrick McCollough	108,742	17.98%
Democratic	William Ralls	104,364	17.25%
Democratic	Scattering	52	0.01%
Total votes		604,861	100.00%

== General election ==
=== Candidates ===
- William Milliken & James H. Brickley, Republican
- William B. Fitzgerald & Olivia P. Maynard, Democratic

=== Results ===
1978 Michigan gubernatorial election
Party	Candidate	Votes	%	±%
Republican	William Milliken (inc.)	1,628,485	56.80%	+5.73%
Democratic	William B. Fitzgerald	1,237,256	43.15%	−3.60%
	Scattering	1,471	0.05%	
Majority		391,229	13.64%	
Total votes		2,867,212	100.00%	
Republican hold		Swing	+9.33%	

==== Results by county ====
Despite his defeat, Fitzgerald flipped several counties that had not voted Democratic in a very long time. Before this election, Alcona County had not voted Democratic since 1878, Oscoda County had not since 1888, and Missaukee County had not since 1890.

County	William Milliken Republican		William B. Fitzgerald Democratic		Scattering Write-in		Margin		Total votes cast
County	#	%	#	%	#	%	#	%	Total votes cast
Alcona	1,868	49.93%	1,870	49.99%	3	0.08%	-2	-0.05%	3,741
Alger	1,237	35.90%	2,209	64.10%	0	0.00%	-972	-28.21%	3,446
Allegan	12,181	52.63%	10,958	47.35%	4	0.02%	1,223	5.28%	23,143
Alpena	5,501	50.21%	5,454	49.79%	0	0.00%	47	0.43%	10,955
Antrim	3,656	57.30%	2,725	42.70%	0	0.00%	931	14.59%	6,381
Arenac	2,272	48.84%	2,379	51.14%	1	0.02%	-107	-2.30%	4,652
Baraga	1,396	47.65%	1,534	52.35%	0	0.00%	-138	-4.71%	2,930
Barry	8,377	54.83%	6,889	45.09%	13	0.09%	1,488	9.74%	15,279
Bay	18,762	45.02%	22,915	54.98%	0	0.00%	-4,153	-9.96%	41,677
Benzie	2,704	61.68%	1,676	38.23%	4	0.09%	1,028	23.45%	4,384
Berrien	29,577	63.92%	16,694	36.08%	3	0.01%	12,883	27.84%	46,274
Branch	6,968	59.97%	4,651	40.03%	0	0.00%	2,317	19.94%	11,619
Calhoun	23,998	54.47%	20,038	45.48%	19	0.04%	3,960	8.99%	44,055
Cass	7,572	60.50%	4,941	39.48%	2	0.02%	2,631	21.02%	12,515
Charlevoix	3,883	52.22%	3,550	47.74%	3	0.04%	333	4.48%	7,436
Cheboygan	3,688	50.90%	3,558	49.10%	0	0.00%	130	1.79%	7,246
Chippewa	5,489	53.95%	4,686	46.05%	0	0.00%	803	7.89%	10,175
Clare	3,729	48.23%	3,999	51.73%	3	0.04%	-270	-3.49%	7,731
Clinton	11,026	59.73%	7,420	40.20%	13	0.07%	3,606	19.54%	18,459
Crawford	1,834	53.08%	1,621	46.92%	0	0.00%	213	6.16%	3,455
Delta	5,693	43.80%	7,304	56.19%	1	0.01%	-1,611	-12.39%	12,998
Dickinson	4,595	47.62%	5,053	52.37%	1	0.01%	-458	-4.75%	9,649
Eaton	19,015	64.17%	10,618	35.83%	0	0.00%	8,397	28.34%	29,633
Emmet	4,995	59.24%	3,437	40.76%	0	0.00%	1,558	18.48%	8,432
Genesee	65,936	50.62%	64,292	49.36%	18	0.01%	1,644	1.26%	130,246
Gladwin	2,894	46.19%	3,371	53.81%	0	0.00%	-477	-7.61%	6,265
Gogebic	3,344	40.24%	4,966	59.76%	0	0.00%	-1,622	-19.52%	8,310
Grand Traverse	11,990	66.46%	6,042	33.49%	8	0.04%	5,948	32.97%	18,040
Gratiot	7,215	60.69%	4,670	39.28%	4	0.03%	2,545	21.41%	11,889
Hillsdale	7,372	61.79%	4,559	38.21%	0	0.00%	2,813	23.58%	11,931
Houghton	6,729	54.15%	5,698	45.85%	0	0.00%	1,031	8.30%	12,427
Huron	7,444	58.19%	5,349	41.81%	0	0.00%	2,095	16.38%	12,793
Ingham	68,334	69.77%	29,356	29.97%	256	0.26%	38,978	39.80%	97,946
Ionia	8,500	53.75%	7,311	46.23%	3	0.02%	1,189	7.52%	15,814
Iosco	4,423	53.35%	3,858	46.54%	9	0.11%	565	6.82%	8,290
Iron	2,563	42.36%	3,488	57.64%	0	0.00%	-925	-15.29%	6,051
Isabella	9,030	59.80%	6,054	40.09%	16	0.11%	2,976	19.71%	15,100
Jackson	27,474	57.21%	20,513	42.72%	34	0.07%	6,961	14.50%	48,021
Kalamazoo	44,825	64.88%	24,220	35.06%	42	0.06%	20,605	29.82%	69,087
Kalkaska	1,642	46.24%	1,906	53.68%	3	0.08%	-264	-7.43%	3,551
Kent	85,292	57.81%	62,153	42.13%	82	0.06%	23,139	15.68%	147,527
Keweenaw	546	48.19%	587	51.81%	0	0.00%	-41	-3.62%	1,133
Lake	1,148	39.53%	1,753	60.37%	3	0.10%	-605	-20.83%	2,904
Lapeer	10,853	56.97%	8,198	43.03%	0	0.00%	2,655	13.94%	19,051
Leelanau	3,882	62.80%	2,296	37.14%	4	0.06%	1,586	25.66%	6,182
Lenawee	14,784	57.45%	10,936	42.50%	14	0.05%	3,848	14.95%	25,734
Livingston	19,011	67.16%	9,292	32.82%	5	0.02%	9,719	34.33%	28,308
Luce	1,168	59.38%	799	40.62%	0	0.00%	369	18.76%	1,967
Mackinac	2,328	53.59%	2,016	46.41%	0	0.00%	312	7.18%	4,344
Macomb	119,334	56.39%	92,241	43.59%	43	0.02%	27,093	12.80%	211,618
Manistee	4,263	53.45%	3,712	46.55%	0	0.00%	551	6.91%	7,975
Marquette	10,201	48.47%	10,847	51.53%	0	0.00%	-646	-3.07%	21,048
Mason	5,323	56.68%	4,065	43.29%	3	0.03%	1,258	13.40%	9,391
Mecosta	6,151	56.58%	4,721	43.42%	0	0.00%	1,430	13.15%	10,872
Menominee	3,565	43.27%	4,674	56.73%	0	0.00%	-1,109	-13.46%	8,239
Midland	16,886	64.33%	9,346	35.60%	19	0.07%	7,540	28.72%	26,251
Missaukee	1,765	43.21%	2,313	56.62%	7	0.17%	-548	-13.41%	4,085
Monroe	16,933	51.80%	15,750	48.18%	7	0.02%	1,183	3.62%	32,690
Montcalm	7,782	55.78%	6,167	44.20%	3	0.02%	1,615	11.58%	13,952
Montmorency	1,473	48.37%	1,572	51.63%	0	0.00%	-99	-3.25%	3,045
Muskegon	27,960	52.65%	25,141	47.34%	3	0.01%	2,819	5.31%	53,104
Newaygo	6,061	53.15%	5,342	46.85%	0	0.00%	719	6.31%	11,403
Oakland	225,870	67.66%	107,830	32.30%	115	0.03%	118,040	35.36%	333,815
Oceana	3,711	51.09%	3,549	48.86%	3	0.04%	162	2.23%	7,263
Ogemaw	2,545	41.72%	3,549	58.18%	6	0.10%	-1,004	-16.46%	6,100
Ontonagon	1,828	41.91%	2,534	58.09%	0	0.00%	-706	-16.19%	4,362
Osceola	3,113	51.78%	2,863	47.62%	36	0.30%	250	4.16%	6,012
Oscoda	610	23.41%	1,996	76.59%	0	0.00%	-1,386	-53.18%	2,606
Otsego	3,151	58.31%	2,253	41.69%	0	0.00%	898	16.62%	5,404
Ottawa	32,271	60.42%	21,132	39.56%	9	0.02%	11,139	20.85%	53,412
Presque Isle	2,785	46.76%	3,165	53.14%	6	0.10%	-380	-6.38%	5,956
Roscommon	3,604	49.98%	3,607	50.02%	0	0.00%	-3	-0.04%	7,211
Saginaw	35,491	53.02%	31,448	46.98%	4	0.01%	4,043	6.04%	66,943
Sanilac	9,099	64.44%	5,007	35.46%	15	0.11%	4,092	28.98%	14,121
Schoolcraft	1,629	48.18%	1,751	51.79%	1	0.03%	-122	-3.61%	3,381
Shiawassee	12,594	54.60%	10,461	45.35%	11	0.05%	2,133	9.25%	23,066
St. Clair	23,287	56.90%	17,640	43.10%	0	0.00%	5,647	13.80%	40,927
St. Joseph	9,083	64.39%	5,013	35.54%	10	0.07%	4,070	28.85%	14,106
Tuscola	9,558	56.86%	7,252	43.14%	0	0.00%	2,306	13.72%	16,810
Van Buren	10,174	55.04%	8,311	44.96%	0	0.00%	1,863	10.08%	18,485
Washtenaw	57,601	70.41%	23,808	29.10%	403	0.49%	33,793	41.31%	81,812
Wayne	339,884	50.40%	334,248	49.57%	188	0.03%	5,636	0.84%	674,320
Wexford	4,157	50.38%	4,086	49.52%	8	0.10%	71	0.86%	8,251
Total	1,628,485	56.80%	1,237,256	43.15%	1,471	0.05%	391,229	13.64%	2,867,212

===== Counties that flipped from Democratic to Republican =====
- Genesee
- Mackinac
- Monroe
- Muskegon
- Wayne

===== Counties that flipped from Republican to Democratic =====
- Alcona
- Arenac
- Clare
- Keweenaw
- Missaukee
- Montmorency
- Ogemaw
- Oscoda
- Presque Isle
- Roscommon
