= Ruth McNamee =

American politician

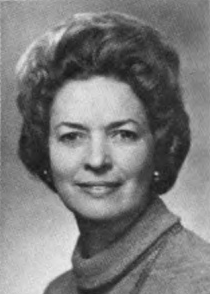
- McNamee c. 1977

Member of the Michigan House of Representatives
- In office January 1, 1975 – January 1, 1984
- Preceded by: James Damman
- Succeeded by: Judith Miller
- Constituency: 63rd district (1975–1982); 65th district (1982–1984)

Personal details
- Born: Ruth Braden; June 7, 1921 New York City, US
- Died: November 19, 2006 (aged 85) Vero Beach, Florida, US
- Party: Republican
- Spouse: William A. McNamee (m. 1946)
- Education: Bucknell University

Ruth Braden McNamee (June 7, 1921 – November 19, 2006) was an American politician.

Born in New York City, New York, McManee received her bachelor's degree in English and political science in 1942 from Bucknell University. She served on the Birmingham, Michigan city commission from 1965 to 1974 and was mayor of Birminghman, Michigan in 1970 and 1971. She also served on the Oakland County, Michigan Board of Commissioners in 1968 and was a Republican. From 1975 to 1984, McNamee served in the Michigan House of Representatives.

McNamee died at the Indian River Medical Center, in Vero Beach, Florida.
