= Thomas E. Brennan =

American judge (1929–2018)

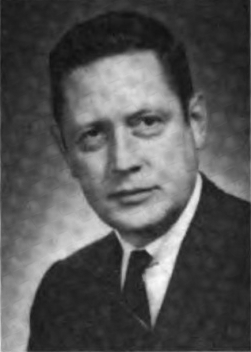

54th Chief Justice of the Michigan Supreme Court
- In office 1969–1970
- Preceded by: John R. Dethmers
- Succeeded by: Thomas M. Kavanagh

81st Justice of the Michigan Supreme Court
- In office January 1, 1967 – December 6, 1973
- Preceded by: Otis M. Smith
- Succeeded by: John W. Fitzgerald

Personal details
- Born: Thomas Emmett Brennan; May 27, 1929 Detroit, Michigan, U.S.
- Died: September 29, 2018 (aged 89) Lansing, Michigan, U.S.
- Education: University of Detroit (LLB)

Thomas E. Brennan (May 27, 1929 – September 29, 2018) was an American attorney, jurist, and academic administrator who was the founder of Thomas M. Cooley Law School and the 81st Justice and chief justice of the Michigan Supreme Court.

== Early life and education ==
Brennan was born in Detroit, Michigan, and graduated from the private Detroit Catholic Central High School, where he excelled in forensics. He attended the University of Detroit and earned a law degree from the University of Detroit Law School in 1952.

== Career ==
=== Campaigns and legal practice ===
He was an unsuccessful candidate for the Michigan House of Representatives from the Wayne County 1st District in 1952 and from the 6th District in 1954. In December 1955, he was the Republican Party candidate in the special election for the U.S. representative from Michigan's 15th congressional district to fill the seat of John Dingell Sr., who had died in office. Brennan lost to Dingell's son, John Dingell Jr.

In 1953, he joined the law firm of Waldron, Brennan, Brennan, and Maher, with whom he worked until 1961, when he was elected to a seat on the Common Pleas Bench. In 1963, he was appointed by Michigan Governor George W. Romney to the Wayne County Circuit Bench, and in 1964 he was elected to that same position.

=== Michigan Supreme Court ===
In 1966, at the urging of Governor Romney, Brennan sought the nomination of the Republican Party as Associate Justice of the Michigan Supreme Court. Brennan won the nomination, and the election. In 1969 and 1970, Brennan served as Chief Justice, the youngest Justice to serve in that capacity.

=== Thomas M. Cooley Law School ===
During his service on the Bench, Brennan received many requests for law school recommendations. This was the basis of his vision for a new, private, law school in Lansing, Michigan. In 1972, he incorporated the Thomas M. Cooley Law School. Brennan left the Supreme Court on December 6, 1973, to dedicate his professional career to the newly formed law school. Brennan served as first Dean of Cooley Law School until 1978, when he became its first president.

=== Later career ===
Brennan was an unsuccessful candidate for U.S. Senator from Michigan in 1976, losing to Marvin L. Esch in the Republican primary election. In 1982, he was an unsuccessful candidate for Lieutenant Governor of Michigan, losing to Democrat Martha W. Griffiths in the general election.

=== Judging the Law Schools ===
In 1996 Brennan began annually issuing his self-styled law school ranking, Judging the Law Schools using various American Bar Association (ABA) -published statistics, which he circulated among other law school deans and had posted on Cooley's website. The rankings consisted of 50 different lists, including a "quality" list. Subsequently, Brennan began self-publishing the rankings. Brennan's rankings garnered considerable criticism when, in 2009, Brennan ranked Cooley as the 12th best law school in the US, and then ridicule when he ranked it as the second-best law school, after only Harvard Law School in the 2011, and final, edition of his rankings.

== Personal life ==
In 1951, he married Pauline M. Weinberger, with whom he had six children. He died in Lansing, Michigan on September 29, 2018.

== Notes ==
Party political offices
Preceded by James H. Brickley	Republican nominee for Lieutenant Governor of Michigan; 1982	Succeeded by Colleen House
