= James Damman =

American politician (1933–2011)

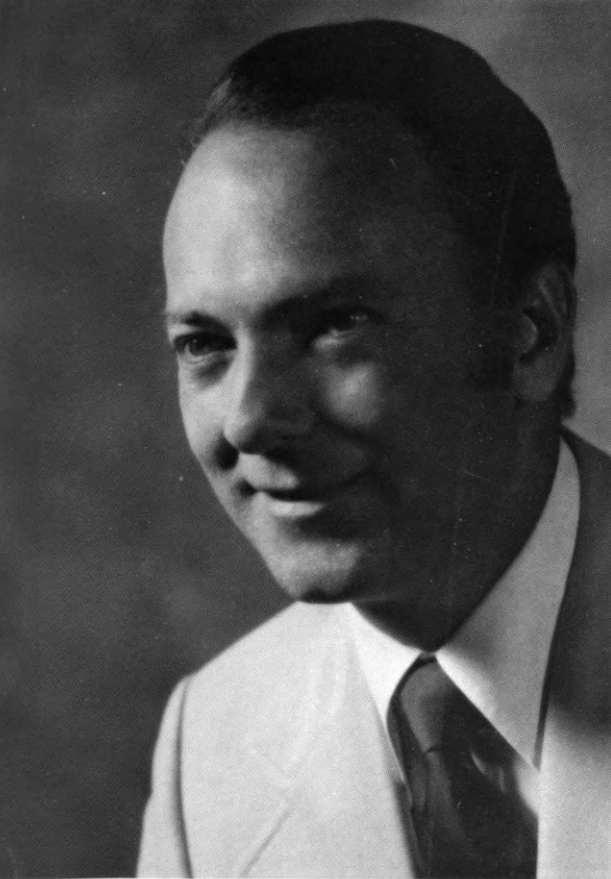

57th Lieutenant Governor of Michigan
- In office January 1, 1975 – January 1, 1979
- Governor: William Milliken
- Preceded by: James H. Brickley
- Succeeded by: James H. Brickley

Member of the Michigan House of Representatives from the 63rd district
- In office January 1, 1971 – December 31, 1974
- Preceded by: Donald E. Bishop
- Succeeded by: Ruth McNamee

Personal details
- Born: January 16, 1933 Grosse Pointe Park, Michigan, U.S.
- Died: February 23, 2011 (aged 78) Austin, Texas, U.S.

Military service
- Allegiance: United States
- Branch/service: United States Army

James Joseph Damman (January 16, 1933 – February 23, 2011) was an American, Republican politician from Michigan.

Born in Grosse Pointe Park, Michigan, Damman served in the United States Army. He then served on the Troy, Michigan city commission and in the Michigan House of Representatives for two terms, and then the 57th lieutenant governor of Michigan 1975–1979 under Governor William Milliken. He also worked for his father's business, the Damman Hardware chain. Damman worked in real estate and then founded QuantumDigital Incorporated, a technology company in Austin, Texas. He died in Austin, Texas.

== Notes ==
Party political offices
| Preceded by James H. Brickley | Republican nominee for Lieutenant Governor of Michigan; 1974 | Succeeded by James H. Brickley |
Political offices
| Preceded by James H. Brickley | Lieutenant Governor of Michigan; 1975–1979 | Succeeded by James H. Brickley |
