= James H. Brickley =

American judge

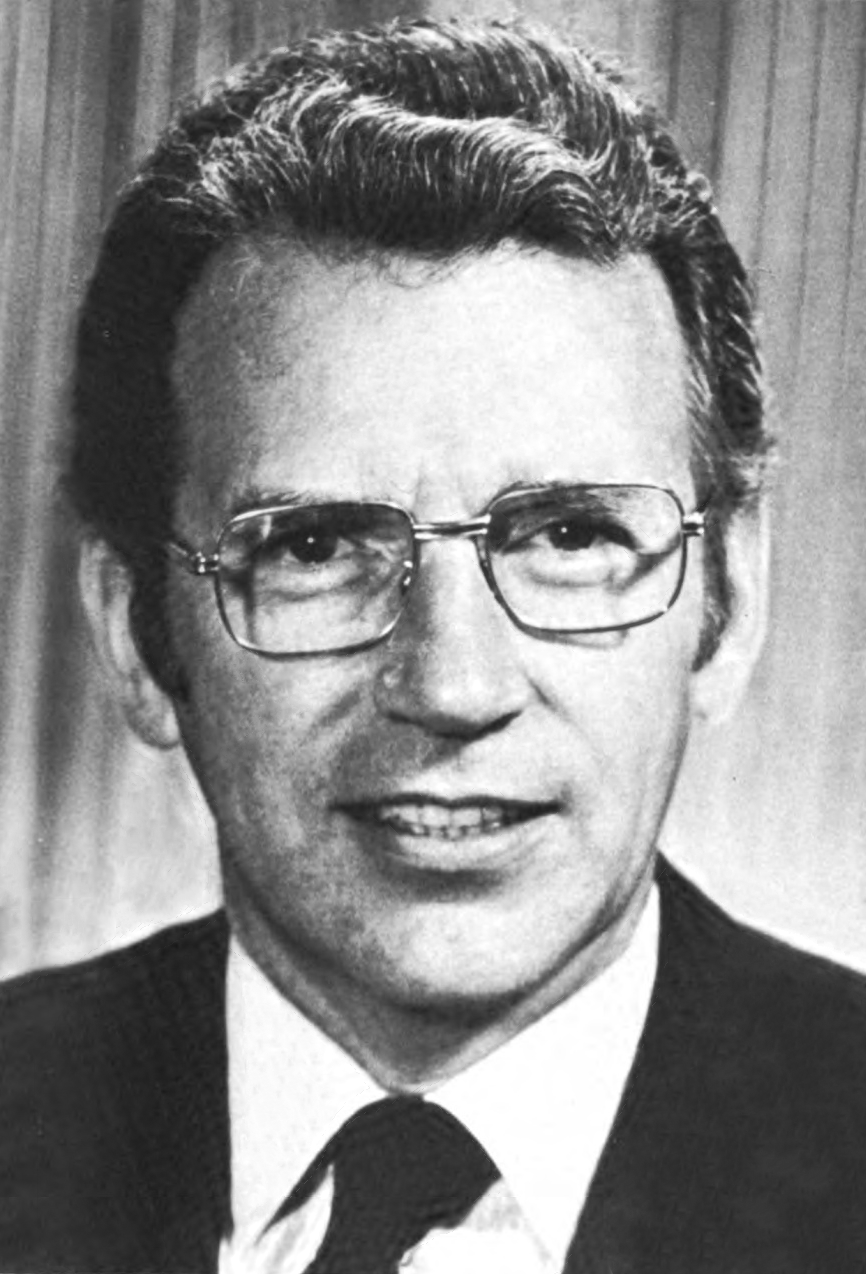

62nd Chief Justice of the Michigan Supreme Court
- In office January 4, 1995 – January 7, 1997
- Preceded by: Michael F. Cavanagh
- Succeeded by: Conrad L. Mallet, Jr.

99th Justice of the Michigan Supreme Court
- In office December 27, 1982 – October 1, 1999
- Preceded by: Mary S. Coleman
- Succeeded by: Stephen Markman

56th & 58th Lieutenant Governor of Michigan
- In office January 1, 1979 – December 27, 1982
- Preceded by: James Damman
- Succeeded by: Martha Griffiths
- In office January 1, 1971 – December 31, 1974
- Preceded by: Thomas F. Schweigert
- Succeeded by: James Damman

23rd President of Eastern Michigan University
- In office 1975–1978
- Preceded by: Harold E. Sponberg; Ralph Gilden (interim)
- Succeeded by: John W. Porter

Personal details
- Born: November 15, 1928 Flint, Michigan, U.S.
- Died: September 28, 2001 (aged 72) Traverse City, Michigan, U.S.
- Spouse: Joyce Braithwaite-Brickley
- Education: New York University; University of Detroit

James H. Brickley (November 15, 1928 – September 28, 2001) was an American judge and politician who served as the 56th and 58th lieutenant governor of Michigan and a justice of the Michigan Supreme Court from 1982 to 1999. He was a member of the Republican Party.

== Biography ==
Brickley was born in Flint, Michigan. He received his baccalaureate and law degree from the University of Detroit and then obtain a Master of Laws degree from New York University.

Brickley served as United States Attorney for the Eastern District of Michigan. He was Lieutenant Governor of Michigan from 1971 to 1974 and again from 1979 to 1982 under Governor William Milliken. From 1975 until 1978 he was president of Eastern Michigan University. Brickley was appointed to the Michigan Supreme Court in December 1982 to replace retiring justice Mary S. Coleman. From 1995 to 1996 Brickley was the chief justice of the Michigan Supreme Court. He retired from the bench in October 1999 and Governor John Engler appointed United States Attorney Stephen Markman to replace him.

He died in Traverse City, Michigan in 2001.

== Notes ==
Party political offices
Preceded by William Milliken	Republican nominee for Lieutenant Governor of Michigan; 1970	Succeeded by James Damman
Preceded by James Damman	Republican nominee for Lieutenant Governor of Michigan; 1978	Succeeded by Thomas E. Brennan
Political offices
Preceded by Thomas F. Schweigert	Lieutenant Governor of Michigan; 1971–1975	Succeeded by James Damman
Preceded by James Damman	Lieutenant Governor of Michigan; 1979–1983	Succeeded by Martha W. Griffiths
