= James T. Milliken =

American politician (1882–1952)

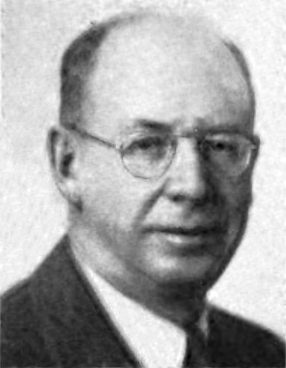

18th Mayor of Traverse City
- In office January 1, 1923 – January 1, 1928
- Preceded by: Lafayette Swanton
- Succeeded by: George W. Lardie

Member of the Michigan Senate from the 27th district
- In office January 1, 1941 – January 1, 1950
- Preceded by: Felix H. H. Flynn
- Succeeded by: Felix H.H. Flynn

Personal details
- Born: James Thacker Milliken; August 20, 1882 Traverse City, Michigan, U.S.
- Died: October 12, 1952 (aged 70) Traverse City, Michigan, U.S.
- Resting place: Oakwood Cemetery
- Party: Republican
- Children: William Milliken, 2 others
- Parent: James W. Milliken (father)
- Education: Olivet College; Yale University
- Occupation: Businessman

James Thacker Milliken (August 20, 1882 – October 12, 1952) was an American politician, and businessman.

== Life ==
Milliken was born in Traverse City, Michigan. He graduated from Traverse City High School in 1902. Milliken also graduated from Olivet College in 1906 and from Yale University in 1908.

Milliken worked for his family business, the J.W. Milliken Inc., Department Store in Traverse City. Milliken also became involved in the Acemeline Manufacturing Company. Milliken then went on to serve as mayor of Traverse City from 1922 to 1928 as a Republican. He also served on the Traverse City Board of Education, and was president of the board of education. Milliken served in the Michigan Senate from 1941 to 1950. His father James W. Milliken and his son William Milliken also served in the Michigan Senate. Milliken died from a heart attack at his home in Traverse City, Michigan.
