= James W. Milliken =

American businessperson and politician

James Wheelock Milliken (May 26, 1848 – June 19, 1908) was an American businessman and politician.

Milliken was born in Denmark, Maine and was raised in Saco, Maine. He worked in a dry goods store in Saco, Maine. In 1868, Milliken moved to Traverse City, Michigan and continued to own a dry goods store in Traverse City. Milliken served in the Michigan Senate from 1897 to 1900 and was a Republican. Milliken died from a stroke on a New York Central train while going to New York City. His son James T. Milliken and his grandson William Milliken also served in the Michigan Senate, with William Milliken going on to become Michigan's longest-serving governor.
