= 1966 Michigan gubernatorial election =

- November 8, 1966
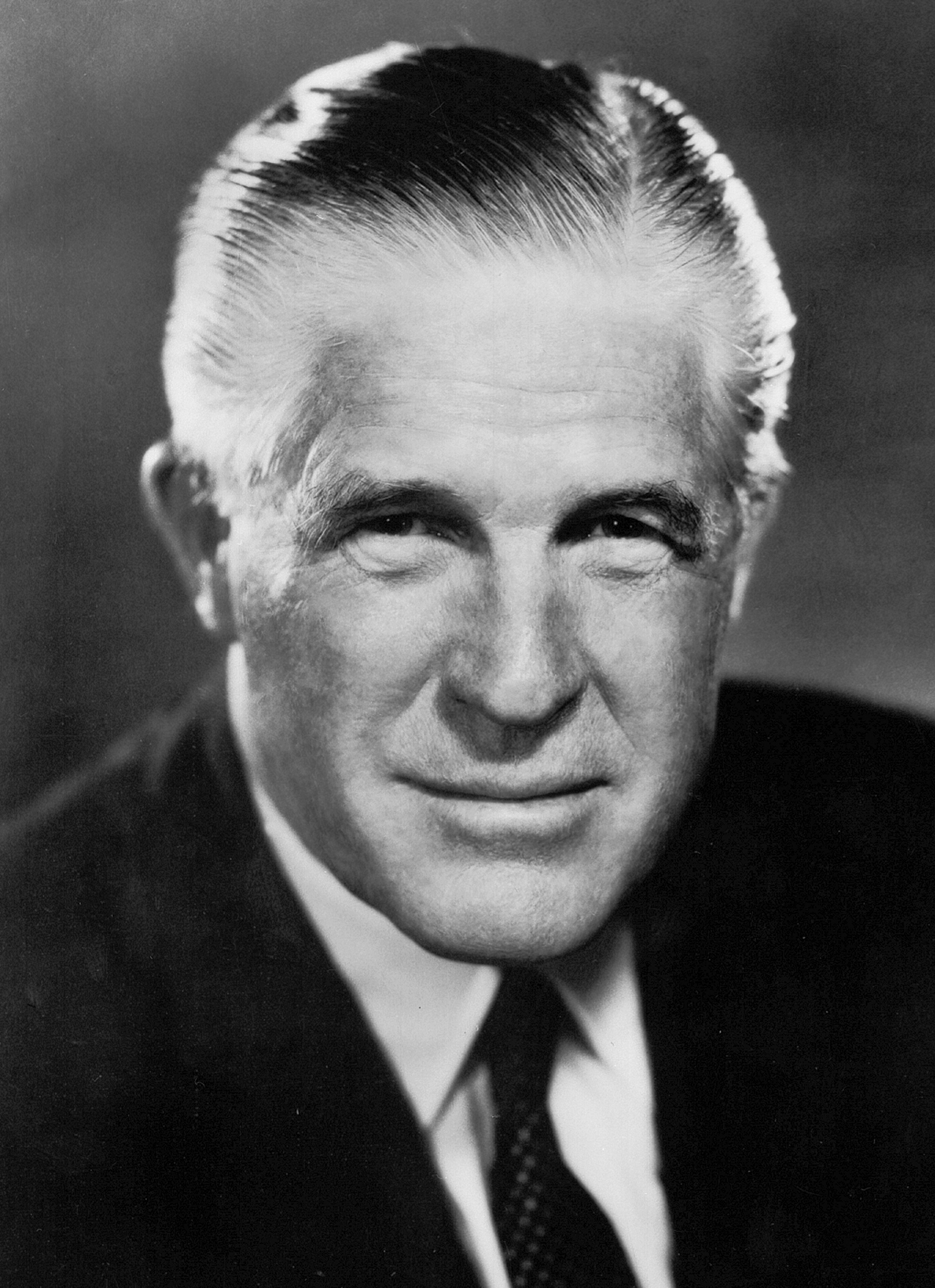

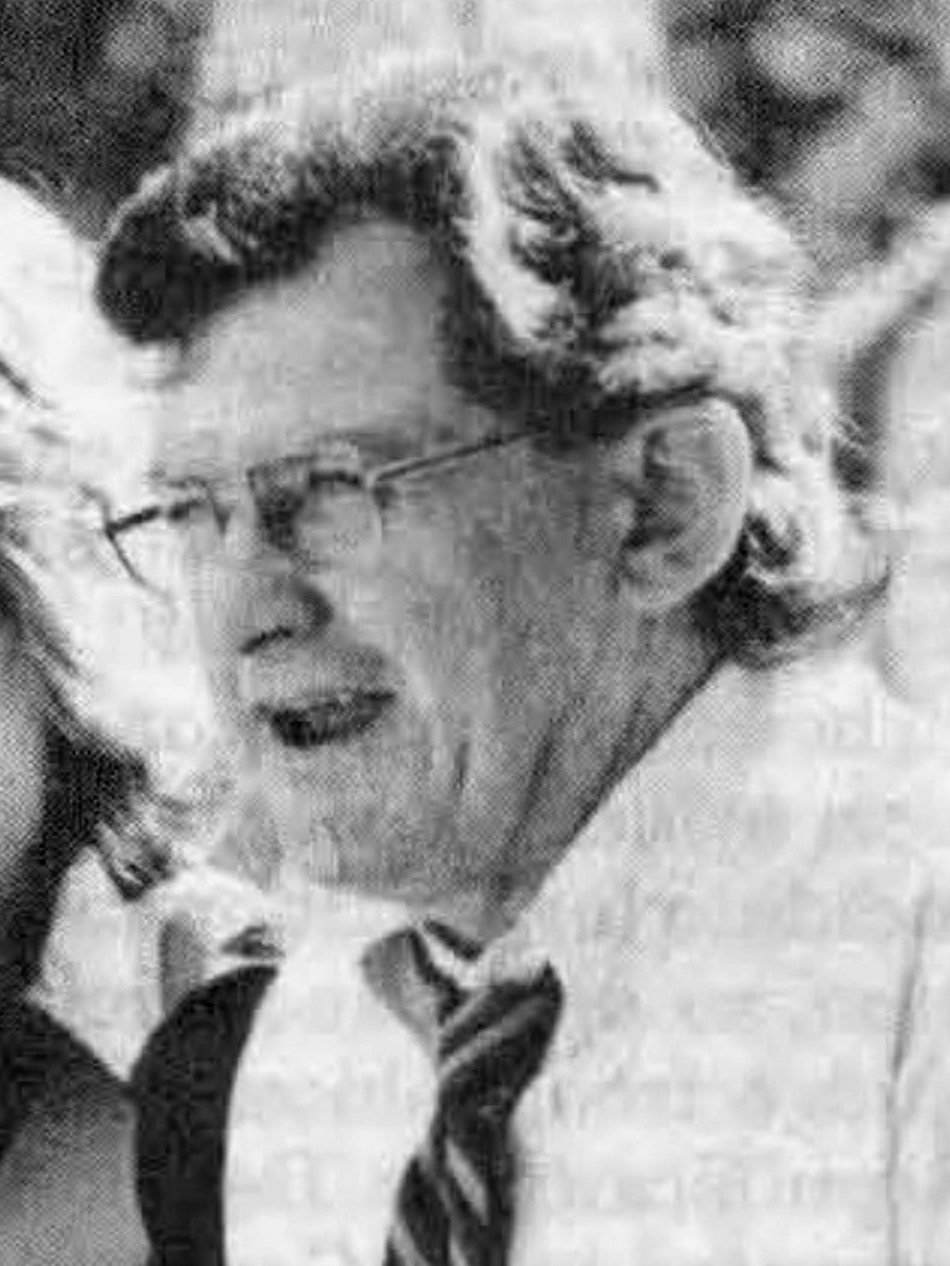
Nominee	George W. Romney	Zolton Ferency
Party	Republican	Democratic
Running mate	William Milliken	John B. Bruff
Popular vote	1,490,430	963,383
Percentage	60.54%	39.13%
- County results Romney: 50–60% 60–70% 70–80% Ferency: 50–60%
Governor before election
George W. Romney
Republican
Elected Governor
George W. Romney
Republican

The 1966 Michigan gubernatorial election was held on November 8, 1966. Incumbent Republican George W. Romney defeated Democratic nominee Zolton Ferency with 60.54% of the vote.

This election marked the first time the governor was elected to a four-year term, following the adoption of new state constitution in 1963.

== Primary election ==
Michigan held primary elections on August 2, 1966.

=== Republican party ===
Incumbent governor George W. Romney won renomination for a third term unopposed.

==== Candidates ====
- George W. Romney, incumbent governor

==== Results ====
Republican primary results
Party	Candidate	Votes	%
Republican	George W. Romney (inc.)	423,876	99.99%
Republican	Scattering	21	0.01%
Total votes		423,897	100.00%

=== Democratic party ===
Zolton Ferency was unopposed for the Democratic nomination.

==== Candidates ====
- Zolton Ferency, chairman of Michigan Democratic Party

==== Results ====
Democratic primary results
Party	Candidate	Votes	%
Democratic	Zolton Ferency	373,426	99.98%
Democratic	Scattering	59	0.02%
Total votes		373,485	100.00%

== General election ==
=== Candidates ===
Major party candidates

- George W. Romney & William Milliken, Republican
- Zolton Ferency & John B. Bruff, Democratic

Other candidates

- James Horvath & W. Clifford Bentley, Socialist Labor

=== Results ===
1966 Michigan gubernatorial election
Party	Candidate	Votes	%	±%
Republican	George W. Romney (inc.)	1,490,430	60.54%	+4.67%
Democratic	Zolton Ferency	963,383	39.13%	−4.61%
Socialist Labor	James Horvath	8,017	0.33%	+0.27%
	Scattering	79	0.00%	
Majority		527,047	21.41%	
Total votes		2,461,909	100.00%	
Republican hold		Swing	+9.28%	

==== Results by county ====
This was the only gubernatorial election between 1930 and 1994 in which Alger County voted Republican.

County	George W. Romney Republican		Zolton Ferency Democratic		James Horvath Socialist Labor		Scattering Write-in		Margin		Total votes cast
County	#	%	#	%	#	%	#	%	#	%	Total votes cast
Alcona	1,559	68.80%	702	30.98%	4	0.18%	1	0.04%	857	37.82%	2,266
Alger	1,643	54.89%	1,348	45.04%	2	0.07%	0	0.00%	295	9.86%	2,993
Allegan	13,733	74.90%	4,563	24.89%	39	0.21%	0	0.00%	9,170	50.01%	18,335
Alpena	5,958	65.05%	3,192	34.85%	9	0.10%	0	0.00%	2,766	30.20%	9,159
Antrim	2,910	71.85%	1,137	28.07%	3	0.07%	0	0.00%	1,773	43.78%	4,050
Arenac	2,040	63.10%	1,185	36.65%	8	0.25%	0	0.00%	855	26.45%	3,233
Baraga	1,680	56.70%	1,273	42.96%	10	0.34%	0	0.00%	407	13.74%	2,963
Barry	8,054	68.78%	3,635	31.04%	21	0.18%	0	0.00%	4,419	37.74%	11,710
Bay	18,659	57.19%	13,920	42.66%	50	0.15%	0	0.00%	4,739	14.52%	32,629
Benzie	2,133	71.92%	828	27.92%	5	0.17%	0	0.00%	1,305	44.00%	2,966
Berrien	28,814	66.36%	14,475	33.34%	130	0.30%	2	0.00%	14,339	33.02%	43,421
Branch	6,571	68.55%	2,997	31.26%	18	0.19%	0	0.00%	3,574	37.28%	9,586
Calhoun	26,890	65.46%	14,051	34.21%	134	0.33%	1	0.00%	12,839	31.26%	41,076
Cass	6,637	62.11%	4,008	37.51%	40	0.37%	1	0.01%	2,629	24.60%	10,686
Charlevoix	3,505	66.98%	1,670	31.91%	58	1.11%	0	0.00%	1,835	35.07%	5,233
Cheboygan	3,354	62.60%	2,003	37.38%	1	0.02%	0	0.00%	1,351	25.21%	5,358
Chippewa	5,634	65.37%	2,969	34.45%	15	0.17%	0	0.00%	2,665	30.92%	8,618
Clare	2,882	68.16%	1,337	31.62%	9	0.21%	0	0.00%	1,545	36.54%	4,228
Clinton	8,198	68.18%	3,813	31.71%	13	0.11%	0	0.00%	4,385	36.47%	12,024
Crawford	1,119	66.13%	568	33.57%	5	0.30%	0	0.00%	551	32.57%	1,692
Delta	6,633	56.85%	5,021	43.03%	14	0.12%	0	0.00%	1,612	13.82%	11,668
Dickinson	5,474	58.31%	3,904	41.59%	9	0.10%	0	0.00%	1,570	16.73%	9,387
Eaton	12,587	69.19%	5,574	30.64%	31	0.17%	0	0.00%	7,013	38.55%	18,192
Emmet	4,057	69.70%	1,756	30.17%	8	0.14%	0	0.00%	2,301	39.53%	5,821
Genesee	68,255	56.24%	52,864	43.56%	239	0.20%	0	0.00%	15,391	12.68%	121,358
Gladwin	2,568	68.43%	1,181	31.47%	3	0.08%	1	0.03%	1,387	36.96%	3,753
Gogebic	4,932	54.97%	4,020	44.81%	20	0.22%	0	0.00%	912	10.16%	8,972
Grand Traverse	8,813	73.37%	3,176	26.44%	22	0.18%	0	0.00%	5,637	46.93%	12,011
Gratiot	7,521	72.84%	2,794	27.06%	11	0.11%	0	0.00%	4,727	45.78%	10,326
Hillsdale	7,384	72.59%	2,767	27.20%	21	0.21%	0	0.00%	4,617	45.39%	10,172
Houghton	7,550	57.29%	5,619	42.64%	9	0.07%	0	0.00%	1,931	14.65%	13,178
Huron	7,945	71.23%	3,192	28.62%	17	0.15%	0	0.00%	4,753	42.61%	11,154
Ingham	47,298	67.50%	22,611	32.27%	159	0.23%	7	0.01%	24,687	35.23%	70,075
Ionia	8,140	65.78%	4,214	34.05%	19	0.15%	2	0.02%	3,926	31.73%	12,375
Iosco	4,031	68.86%	1,818	31.06%	5	0.09%	0	0.00%	2,213	37.80%	5,854
Iron	3,469	51.23%	3,288	48.56%	14	0.21%	0	0.00%	181	2.67%	6,771
Isabella	6,500	68.86%	2,922	30.95%	18	0.19%	0	0.00%	3,578	37.90%	9,440
Jackson	27,228	68.54%	12,426	31.28%	69	0.17%	1	0.00%	14,802	37.26%	39,724
Kalamazoo	39,004	72.49%	14,636	27.20%	162	0.30%	3	0.01%	24,368	45.29%	53,805
Kalkaska	1,161	66.38%	588	33.62%	0	0.00%	0	0.00%	573	32.76%	1,749
Kent	83,524	70.21%	35,230	29.61%	210	0.18%	1	0.00%	48,294	40.60%	118,965
Keweenaw	582	49.24%	599	50.68%	1	0.08%	0	0.00%	-17	-1.44%	1,182
Lake	1,159	50.52%	1,129	49.22%	6	0.26%	0	0.00%	30	1.31%	2,294
Lapeer	7,695	67.14%	3,753	32.75%	11	0.10%	2	0.02%	3,942	34.39%	11,461
Leelanau	2,639	69.17%	1,171	30.69%	5	0.13%	0	0.00%	1,468	38.48%	3,815
Lenawee	15,340	71.09%	6,071	28.14%	165	0.76%	1	0.00%	9,269	42.96%	21,577
Livingston	10,046	71.06%	4,063	28.74%	29	0.21%	0	0.00%	5,983	42.32%	14,138
Luce	1,278	66.74%	634	33.11%	3	0.16%	0	0.00%	644	33.63%	1,915
Mackinac	2,666	66.42%	1,341	33.41%	7	0.17%	0	0.00%	1,325	33.01%	4,014
Macomb	75,419	55.65%	59,643	44.01%	462	0.34%	4	0.00%	15,776	11.64%	135,528
Manistee	4,505	61.59%	2,803	38.32%	6	0.08%	0	0.00%	1,702	23.27%	7,314
Marquette	9,592	57.83%	6,961	41.97%	33	0.20%	0	0.00%	2,631	15.86%	16,586
Mason	5,101	61.58%	3,177	38.36%	5	0.06%	0	0.00%	1,924	23.23%	8,283
Mecosta	4,515	71.34%	1,807	28.55%	4	0.06%	3	0.05%	2,708	42.79%	6,329
Menominee	4,802	60.69%	3,097	39.14%	13	0.16%	0	0.00%	1,705	21.55%	7,912
Midland	13,732	73.86%	4,805	25.84%	56	0.30%	0	0.00%	8,927	48.01%	18,593
Missaukee	2,039	77.21%	601	22.76%	1	0.04%	0	0.00%	1,438	54.45%	2,641
Monroe	18,153	60.31%	11,858	39.40%	87	0.29%	1	0.00%	6,295	20.91%	30,099
Montcalm	8,088	69.89%	3,465	29.94%	20	0.17%	0	0.00%	4,623	39.95%	11,573
Montmorency	1,243	64.81%	673	35.09%	2	0.10%	0	0.00%	570	29.72%	1,918
Muskegon	30,031	61.96%	18,288	37.73%	153	0.32%	0	0.00%	11,743	24.23%	48,472
Newaygo	6,403	72.56%	2,413	27.35%	8	0.09%	0	0.00%	3,990	45.22%	8,824
Oakland	167,286	68.82%	74,607	30.69%	1,179	0.49%	3	0.00%	92,679	38.13%	243,075
Oceana	3,970	67.86%	1,872	32.00%	8	0.14%	0	0.00%	2,098	35.86%	5,850
Ogemaw	2,310	64.51%	1,270	35.46%	1	0.03%	0	0.00%	1,040	29.04%	3,581
Ontonagon	2,535	56.84%	1,921	43.07%	4	0.09%	0	0.00%	614	13.77%	4,460
Osceola	3,458	74.64%	1,170	25.25%	4	0.09%	1	0.02%	2,288	49.38%	4,633
Oscoda	1,017	71.82%	394	27.82%	5	0.35%	0	0.00%	623	44.00%	1,416
Otsego	1,851	61.23%	1,169	38.67%	3	0.10%	0	0.00%	682	22.56%	3,023
Ottawa	29,283	78.78%	7,819	21.04%	67	0.18%	1	0.00%	21,464	57.75%	37,170
Presque Isle	2,538	58.44%	1,802	41.49%	2	0.05%	1	0.02%	736	16.95%	4,343
Roscommon	2,323	67.39%	1,113	32.29%	11	0.32%	0	0.00%	1,210	35.10%	3,447
Saginaw	36,051	62.18%	21,775	37.56%	149	0.26%	0	0.00%	14,276	24.62%	57,975
Sanilac	8,791	77.56%	2,537	22.38%	3	0.03%	4	0.04%	6,254	55.17%	11,335
Schoolcraft	1,975	57.93%	1,431	41.98%	3	0.09%	0	0.00%	544	15.96%	3,409
Shiawassee	10,920	62.91%	6,397	36.85%	42	0.24%	0	0.00%	4,523	26.06%	17,359
St. Clair	22,589	69.47%	9,853	30.30%	73	0.22%	0	0.00%	12,736	39.17%	32,515
St. Joseph	8,805	72.48%	3,323	27.35%	19	0.16%	2	0.02%	5,482	45.12%	12,149
Tuscola	9,369	70.22%	3,961	29.69%	13	0.10%	0	0.00%	5,408	40.53%	13,343
Van Buren	10,067	68.02%	4,678	31.61%	54	0.36%	0	0.00%	5,389	36.41%	14,799
Washtenaw	40,676	70.84%	16,472	28.69%	258	0.45%	13	0.02%	24,204	42.15%	57,419
Wayne	379,288	49.07%	390,221	50.49%	3,399	0.44%	23	0.00%	-10,933	-1.41%	772,931
Wexford	4,253	68.23%	1,971	31.62%	9	0.14%	0	0.00%	2,282	36.61%	6,233
Total	1,490,430	60.54%	963,383	39.13%	8,017	0.33%	79	0.00%	527,047	21.41%	2,461,909

===== Counties that flipped from Democratic to Republican =====
- Alger
- Baraga
- Gogebic
- Iron
- Lake
