= William Milliken =

American politician and businessman (1922–2019)

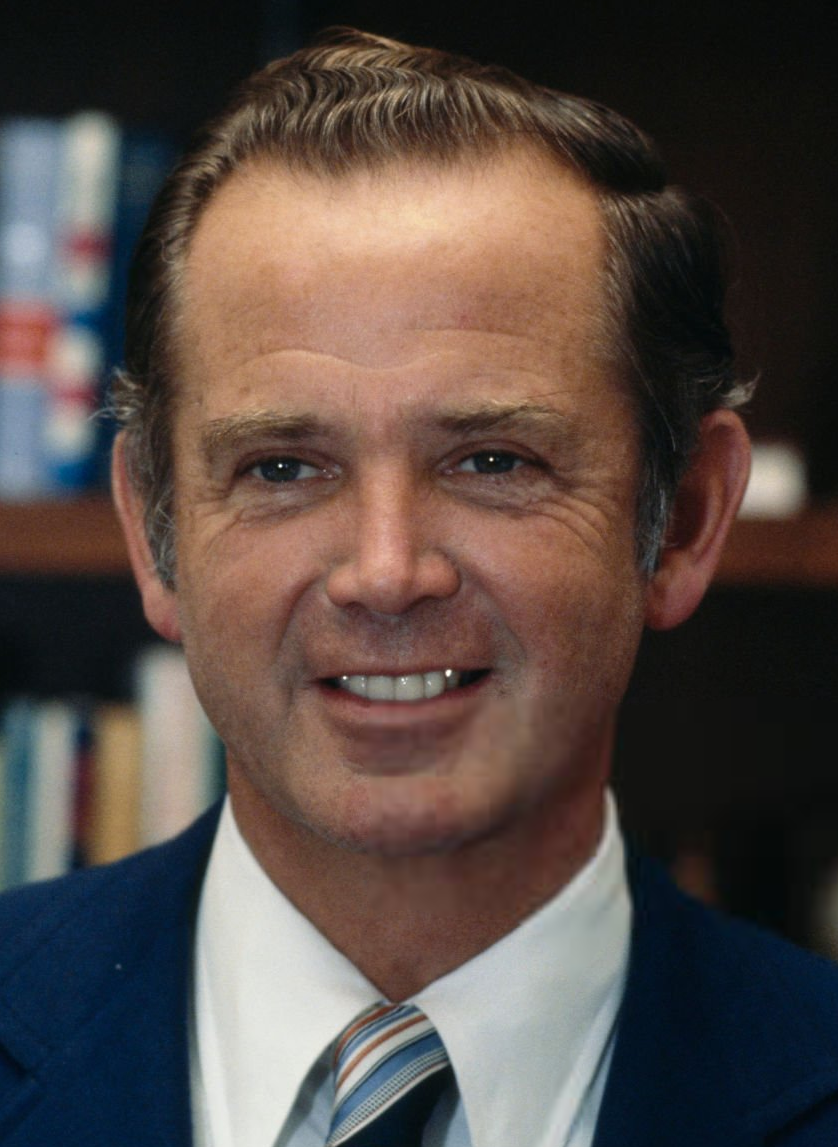
- Milliken in 1978

44th Governor of Michigan
- In office January 22, 1969 – January 1, 1983
- Lieutenant: Thomas F. Schweigert (acting); James H. Brickley; James Damman; James H. Brickley
- Preceded by: George W. Romney
- Succeeded by: Jim Blanchard

Chair of the National Governors Association
- In office September 9, 1977 – August 29, 1978
- Preceded by: Reubin Askew
- Succeeded by: Julian Carroll

54th Lieutenant Governor of Michigan
- In office January 1, 1965 – January 22, 1969
- Governor: George W. Romney
- Preceded by: T. John Lesinski
- Succeeded by: Thomas F. Schweigert (acting)

Member of the Michigan Senate from the 27th district
- In office January 1, 1961 – December 31, 1964
- Preceded by: John Minnema
- Succeeded by: William Romano

Personal details
- Born: William Grawn Milliken; March 26, 1922 Traverse City, Michigan, U.S.
- Died: October 18, 2019 (aged 97) Traverse City, Michigan, U.S.
- Party: Republican
- Spouse: Helen Wallbank (m. 1945; died 2012)
- Children: 2
- Parent: James T. Milliken (father)
- Relatives: James W. Milliken (grandfather)
- Education: Yale University (BA)

Military service
- Allegiance: United States
- Branch/service: United States Army
- Years of service: 1942–1945
- Rank: Staff sergeant
- Unit: United States Army Air Forces
- Battles/wars: World War II

William Grawn Milliken (March 26, 1922 – October 18, 2019) was an American businessman and politician who served as the 44th governor of Michigan from 1969 to 1983. A member of the Republican Party, he assumed the governorship following the resignation of George Romney and went on to win three terms in 1970, 1974, and 1978, (Note: In 1992, the voters of Michigan approved a ballot initiative limiting governors to two terms for lifetime.) becoming the longest-serving governor in Michigan history. During this period he dealt with dramatic changes to the state economy, due to industrial restructuring and challenges to the auto industry, resulting in loss of jobs and population from Detroit, the state's largest city. He also oversaw the PBB crisis and adopted a policy of environmental protection and conservation.

== Early life ==
Milliken was born in Traverse City, Michigan, the second child in a family devoted to public service. His father, James T. Milliken, served as mayor of Traverse City and as Michigan state senator for the 27th District, 1941–1950, and his mother Hildegarde (née Grawn) served on the Traverse City School Board; she was the first woman elected to public office in the city. Milliken's paternal grandfather James W. Milliken had previously one term as a Michigan state senator from the 27th District, 1898–1900.

After graduating magna cum laude from Traverse City Senior High School, Milliken entered Yale University, where he met his future wife, Helen Wallbank. In 1942, he interrupted his studies to enlist in the Army Reserve Corps and, in early 1943, volunteered for the Army Air Corps. During World War II, he flew 50 combat missions as a waist-gunner on B-24 bombers and survived two crash landings. He received seven military honors, including the Purple Heart and Air Medal.

On October 20, 1945, one month after his honorable discharge, Milliken married Helen. The couple had two children: a daughter, Elaine, a lawyer and feminist who died of cancer in 1993; and a son, William, Jr. The following spring, Milliken graduated from Yale.

Milliken's logo

William and Helen Milliken moved back to Traverse City that year and he became president of J.W. Milliken, Inc., a department store founded by his grandfather, and later run by his father. Milliken's operated locations in Traverse City, Cadillac, Manistee and Mount Pleasant at its peak before being sold to Stage Stores in 1996, then operated as Stage–Milliken before finally being shuttered in 2001. Helen Milliken died at the age of 89 on November 16, 2012, at their Traverse City home, from ovarian cancer.

== Political career ==
In 1947, Governor Kim Sigler appointed Milliken to the Michigan Waterways Commission. In 1960, Milliken was elected as a state senator from the 27th District, serving from 1961 to 1964. He was elected and served as the 54th lieutenant governor of Michigan from 1965 to 1969. He succeeded to the position of governor after George W. Romney resigned from office to serve in President Richard Nixon's cabinet. Milliken was subsequently elected to full four-year terms in his own right in 1970, 1974, and 1978. He was considered to be a moderate Rockefeller Republican. In June 1982, the governor led the formation of the Council of Great Lakes Governors.

As Governor for 14 years, Milliken is the longest-serving man in that position in state history. With governors limited to 2 absolute terms in office since 1992, it is unlikely that any will serve longer than Milliken. John Engler served for 12 years as governor from 1991 to 2003, making him the second Republican after Milliken to serve three four-year terms. Milliken is the only United States Governor to proclaim a Statewide Frisbee Day.

In December 1982, Milliken appointed Dorothy Comstock Riley to the Michigan Supreme Court to fill the vacancy caused by the death of Blair Moody, Jr. Riley had run for election to the Supreme Court in the 1982 general election and had been defeated. Milliken was leaving office in less than a month and newly elected Democratic governor James Blanchard argued he should have made the appointment to replace Moody rather than Milliken. In 1983, the other Supreme Court Justices voted 4–2 to remove Riley from the court, and Blanchard appointed his own choice. Riley was elected to the court in her own right in 1985.

== Later life ==
After retiring from public office, Milliken moved back to Traverse City. He soon joined the board of directors of the Chrysler Corporation and chaired the Center for the Great Lakes, a research center dedicated to the protection of the Great Lakes. He spoke at the funeral of former Mayor of Detroit Coleman Young in 1997, who was the first African American elected as mayor of that city.

In presidential elections since 2004, Milliken expressed support for several Democratic candidates. In 2004, he endorsed Democratic senator John Kerry in his bid to unseat George W. Bush, stating "The truth is that President George W. Bush does not speak for me or for many other moderate Republicans on a very broad cross section of issues." In 2008, he endorsed Republican John McCain, but backed away in October after McCain's campaign began attacking Democratic candidate Barack Obama. He told The Grand Rapids Press that "He is not the John McCain I endorsed." Milliken expressed concern about the direction of the Republican Party: "Increasingly, the party is moving toward rigidity, and I don't like that. I think Gerald Ford would hold generally the same view I'm holding on the direction of the Republican Party." In August 2016, Milliken announced that he would vote for Hillary Clinton for president in the 2016 presidential election, saying that Donald Trump does not embody Republican ideals.

In Michigan state elections, Milliken supported candidates from both parties. In 2010, he endorsed businessman Rick Snyder in the Republican gubernatorial primary, and continued to support him in the general election. In 2014, he endorsed Snyder for a second term. In the 2014 Senate election, he supported Democrat Gary Peters over the Republican nominee Terri Lynn Land.

In 2015, Milliken signed an amicus brief in support of same-sex marriage.

== Death ==
On October 18, 2019, Milliken died at his home in Traverse City after years of declining health. His remains were cremated and buried on Mackinac Island next to wife, Helen and daughter, Elaine. On August 6, 2020, he was honored with a memorial service at Interlochen Center for the Arts.

== Honors ==
- In 1976, Governor Milliken was awarded an honorary Doctor of Laws by Yale University, his alma mater.
- In 2006, Dave Dempsey published a biography on Milliken titled, William G. Milliken: Michigan's Passionate Moderate.
- In fall 2009, the state of Michigan named a new state park (William G. Milliken State Park and Harbor), located on the riverfront in Detroit, in honor of the former governor.
- Rooms 290, 291, and 292 of Grand Hotel on Mackinac Island are collectively known as the Milliken Suite. They are located at the east end of the second floor overlooking the golf course.

== See also ==
- Great Michigan Pizza Funeral

== Notes ==
Political offices
| Preceded by John Lesinski | Lieutenant Governor of Michigan; 1965–1969 | Succeeded by Thomas F. Schweigert; Acting |
| Preceded by George Romney | Governor of Michigan; 1969–1983 | Succeeded by Jim Blanchard |
| Preceded by Rubin Askew | Chair of the National Governors Association; 1977–1978 | Succeeded by Julian Carroll |
Party political offices
| Preceded by Clarence A. Reid | Republican nominee for Lieutenant Governor of Michigan; 1964, 1966 | Succeeded by James H. Brickley |
| Preceded by George Romney | Republican nominee for Governor of Michigan; 1970, 1974, 1978 | Succeeded by Richard Headlee |
| Preceded by Louie B. Nunn | Chair of the Republican Governors Association; 1971–1972 | Succeeded by Lin Holton |
