= Clarence A. Reid =

American politician

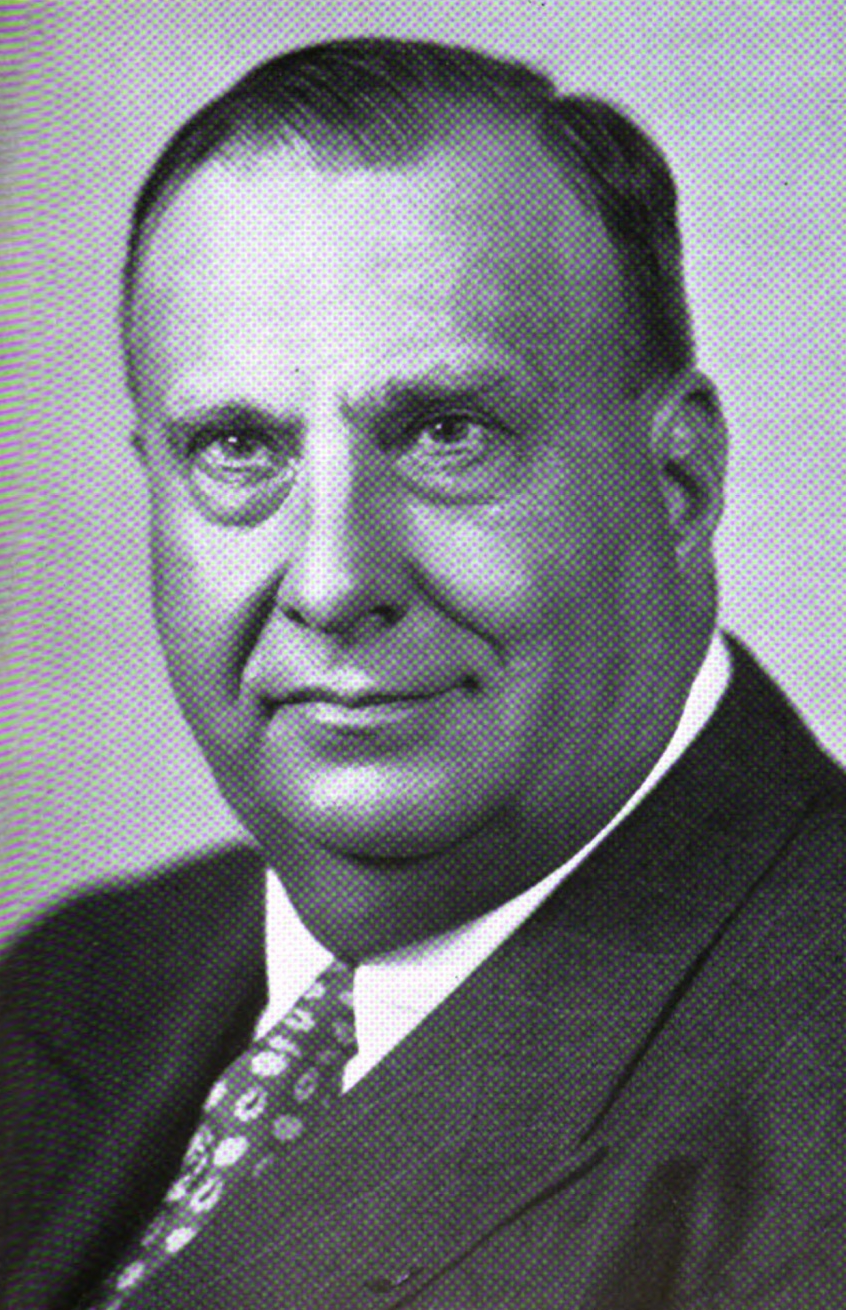

50th Lieutenant Governor of Michigan
- In office January 1, 1953 – January 1. 1955
- Governor: G. Mennen Williams
- Preceded by: William C. Vandenberg
- Succeeded by: Philip Hart

Member of the Michigan Senate from the 18th district
- In office January 1, 1941 – January 1, 1949
- Preceded by: Clyde V. Fenner
- Succeeded by: James P. Hannan
- In office January 1, 1951 – January 1, 1953
- Preceded by: James P. Hannan
- Succeeded by: Charles S. Blondy

Personal details
- Born: December 11, 1892 Circleville, Ohio
- Died: January 1978 (aged 85)
- Party: Republican
- Spouse: Grace Mapes (m.1921)
- Children: 3
- Education: Circleville High School; University of Michigan Law School

Military service
- Allegiance: United States
- Branch/service: United States Army
- Rank: Second Lieutenant
- Battles/wars: World War I

Clarence A. Reid (December 11, 1892 – January 1978) was the 50th lieutenant governor of Michigan, from 1953 to 1955.

== Early life ==
Reid was born in a log cabin in Circleville, Ohio on December 11, 1892.

== Education ==
Reid graduated Circleville High School. Reid attended the University of Michigan Law School. His education was interrupted by his enlistment into the United States Army, but was continued afterward. Reid was admitted to the bar in 1920.

== Military career ==
Reid enlisted into the United States Army in 1917 during World War I. Reid was first assigned to the 85th Infantry Division, then later to the 14th Infantry Division.

== Career ==
After World War I, Reid opened a law office in Detroit, Michigan in 1920. Reid was a failed candidate in the 1932 Republican primary for the position of the United States representative from Michigan's 15th district. Reid ran for the position of member of the Michigan Senate from the 18th district in 1934 and 1938. Reid was elected to this position in 1940, and served in this position from 1941 to 1948. In 1948, he would not win re-election, being defeated by James P. Hannan. He would be elected to this position again on 1950, and served his last term in the Michigan Senate from 1951 to 1952. In 1953, Reid served as the lieutenant governor under Governor G. Mennen Williams. Reid failed to gain re-election to this position in 1954, 1956, 1960, and 1962.

== Personal life ==
Reid married Grace Mapes on March 26, 1921. Together they had three children. Reid was a member of a number of groups including the Lions Club, the Elks, the Eagles, the Forty and Eight, the American Legion, and the American Bar Association. Reid was a Freemason.

== Death ==
Reid died in the January of 1978.

Party political offices
Preceded by William C. Vandenberg	Republican nominee for Lieutenant Governor of Michigan; 1952, 1954, 1956	Succeeded by Donald A. Brown
Preceded by Donald A. Brown	Republican nominee for Lieutenant Governor of Michigan; 1960, 1962	Succeeded by William Milliken
