= John W. Connolly =

American politician

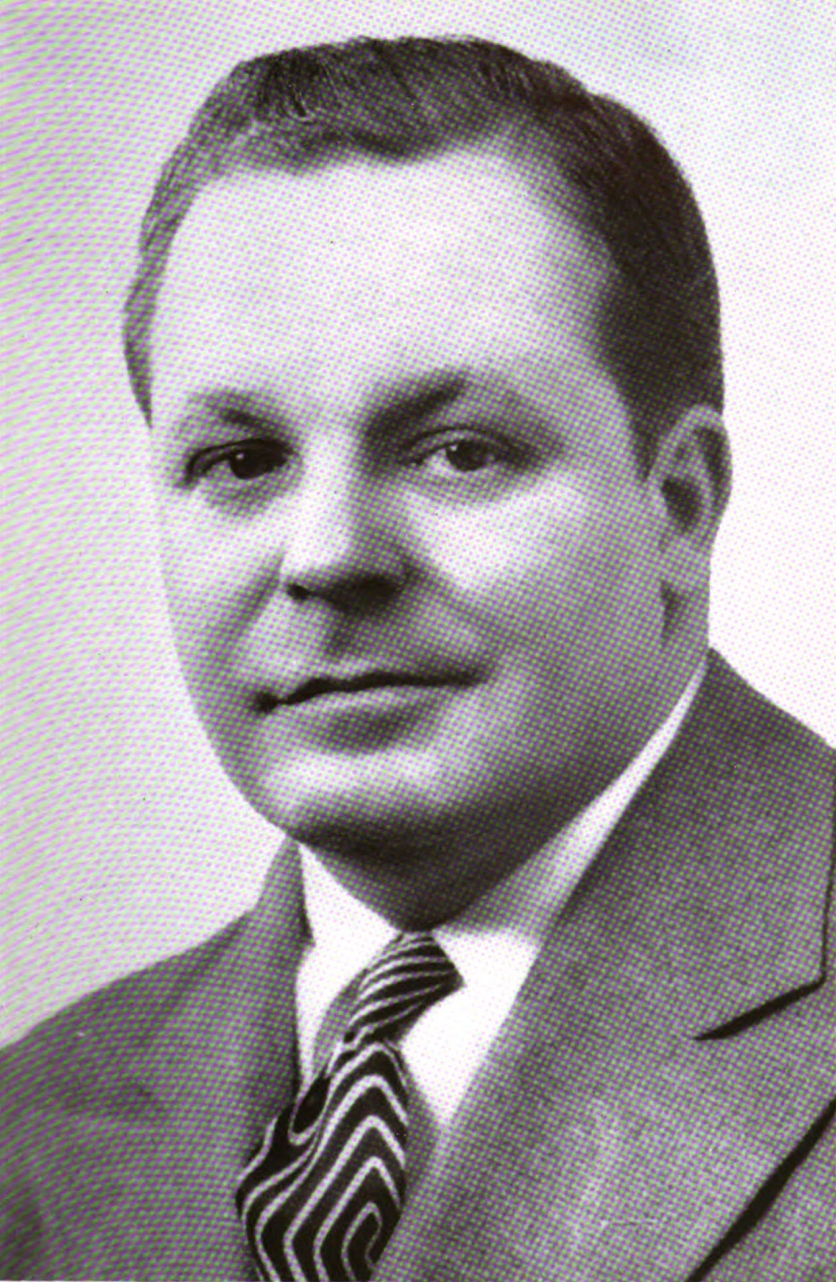

48th Lieutenant Governor of Michigan
- In office 1949–1950
- Governor: G. Mennen Williams
- Preceded by: Eugene C. Keyes
- Succeeded by: William C. Vandenberg

Personal details
- Born: July 4, 1911 Detroit, Michigan, U.S.
- Died: July 11, 1981 (aged 70) Detroit, Michigan, U.S.
- Party: Democratic
- Education: Georgetown University Law School

Military service
- Allegiance: United States Navy
- Years of service: 1942-1946
- Rank: Lieutenant
- Battles/wars: World War II

John W. Connolly (July 4, 1911 – July 11, 1981) was the 48th lieutenant governor of Michigan.

== Early life ==
Connolly was born in Detroit, Michigan, on July 4, 1911. Connolly graduated from Georgetown University Law School in 1936. In 1937, he began work as a lawyer.

== Military career ==
In 1942, Connolly joined the United States Naval Reserve, where he served until 1946. In the service, he earned the rank of Senior Grade Lieutenant. His work as a lawyer was interrupted by his military service, and he returned to working as a lawyer afterwards.

== Political career ==
In 1949, Connolly was sworn in as Lieutenant Governor of Michigan, as running mate to G. Mennen Williams. At the end of his term, in 1950, he sought re-election unsuccessfully, and tried again in 1952. Connolly ran for circuit judge in Michigan 3rd Circuit in 1964 and 1966, both runs unsuccessful.

== Personal life ==
Connolly was a member of both Veterans of Foreign Wars and the American Legion. Connolly was Catholic.

== Death ==
Connolly died on July 11, 1981, in Detroit.

Party political offices
Preceded by William Osmund Kelly	Democratic nominee for Lieutenant Governor of Michigan; 1948, 1950, 1952	Succeeded by Philip Hart
