= E. Harold Munn =

American politician (1903–1992)

- Munn, circa early 1960s

Chairman of the Prohibition Party
- In office 1955–1971
- Preceded by: Lowell H. Coate
- Succeeded by: Charles Wesley Ewing

Chairman of the Michigan Prohibition Party
- In office 1947–1953

Personal details
- Born: Earle Harold Munn; November 29, 1903 Bay Village, Dover Bay, Ohio, U.S.
- Died: June 6, 1992 (aged 88) Hillsdale, Michigan, U.S.
- Party: Prohibition
- Spouse: Luella Mae Asfahl
- Children: 2
- Parents: Earle Orren Munn (father); Ella Carrie Deming (mother)
- Education: Greenville College; University of Michigan

Earle Harold Munn (November 29, 1903 – June 6, 1992) was an American politician who served as the chairman of the Prohibition Party. With the Prohibition Party, he ran as a third-party candidate for President and Vice President of the United States.

== Early life and education ==
Earle Harold Munn was born on November 29, 1903, to Earle Orren Munn and Ella Carrie Deming in Bay Village, Ohio. He attended Greenville College and in 1928, he graduated from the University of Michigan with a master's degree. From 1927 to 1937 he served as a teacher at Central Academy and College and later became a professor at Greenville College and Hillsdale College.

== Political career ==
During the 1932 presidential election, Munn supported Herbert Hoover in an attempt to save prohibition, but Hoover was defeated in a landslide. In 1941, he ran for a seat on the Michigan Board of Regents as a member of the Prohibition Party. In 1947, he became the chairman of the Michigan Prohibition Party; with the party, he ran for governor in 1952 and 1954.

In 1955, he was elected as the national chairman of the party without any opposition. At the Prohibition Party's national convention on September 3, 1959, Rutherford Decker and Munn were given the presidential and vice-presidential nominations for the 1960 presidential election by 95 delegates.

On August 27, 1963, around 300 delegates attended the Prohibition National Convention, voting to nominate Munn and Mark R. Shaw as the party's presidential and vice-presidential candidates, respectively. In the general election, Munn received 23,267 votes.

On June 29, 1968, 56 delegates attended the convention, nominating a ticket of Munn and Rolland E. Fisher. In the general election, Munn received 15,123 votes.

On June 25, 1971, Munn won the presidential nomination again, with Marshall E. Uncapher as his running mate. He received 13,497 votes in the general election.

On June 6, 1992, he died in Hillsdale, Michigan at age 88.

== Electoral history ==
1952 Michigan gubernatorial election
Party	Candidate	Votes	%	±%
Democratic	G. Mennen Williams	1,431,893	49.96%	+0.20%
Republican	Frederick M. Alger Jr.	1,423,275	49.66%	−0.04%
Prohibition	E. Harold Munn	8,990	0.31%	−0.14%
Socialist Labor	Theos A. Grove	1,192	0.04%	−0.02%
Socialist Workers	Howard Lerner	628	0.02%	−0.01%
N/A	Other	2	0.00%	
Total votes		2,865,980	100.00%	

1954 Michigan gubernatorial election
Party	Candidate	Votes	%	±%
Democratic	G. Mennen Williams	1,216,308	55.62%	+5.66%
Republican	Donald S. Leonard	963,300	44.05%	−5.61%
Prohibition	E. Harold Munn	5,824	0.27%	−0.04%
Socialist Labor	Theos A. Grove	980	0.05%	+0.01%
Socialist Workers	Frank Lovell	615	0.03%	+0.01%
Total votes		2,187,027	100.00%	

Party political offices
Preceded by Rutherford Decker	Prohibition Party presidential candidate 1964, 1968, 1972	Succeeded by Benjamin C. Bubar
Preceded by Edwin M. Cooper	Prohibition Party vice presidential candidate 1960	Succeeded by Mark R. Shaw
Preceded by Lowell H. Coate	Prohibition Party Chairman; 1955-1971	Succeeded by Charles Wesley Ewing
