= Tom Leith =

American football and basketball coach

Biographical details
- Born: 1888
- Died: August 24, 1960 (aged 71)

Playing career

Football
- 1906–1908: Michigan State Normal
- 1909: Syracuse

Baseball
- c. 1907: Michigan State Normal

Track and field
- c. 1907: Michigan State Normal
- Positions: Halfback, quarterback (football); Pitcher (baseball)

Coaching career (HC unless noted)

Football
- 1910: Albion HS (MI)
- 1911–1912: Adrian
- 1913: Cleary
- 1914: Mack Park Maroons
- 1915: Detroit University School (MI)
- 1920: Brighton HS (MI)

Basketball
- 1911–1913: Adrian

Track and field
- 1915–1916: Detroit University School (MI)

Administrative career (AD unless noted)
- 1911–1913: Adrian

Head coaching record
- Overall: 4–9 (college basketball)

Accomplishments and honors

Championships
- Football; 1 MIAA (1911)

Thomas S. Leith (1888 – August 24, 1960) was an American football, basketball, and track and field coach, athletics administrator, and politician. He was the head football coach at Adrian College in Adrian, Michigan for two seasons, from 1911 to 1912, compiling a record of 12–4. Leith was also the head basketball coach at Adrian from 1911 to 1913, tallying a mark of 4–9. He later served three terms as the mayor of Brighton, Michigan, and twice ran unsuccessfully for the Republican Party's nomination for the governor of Michigan.

== Playing career ==
Leith was a star athlete while at Michigan State Normal College, now known as Eastern Michigan University. It was reported that he never lost a track event he competed in and was player-coach for the football team. His athletic accomplishments earned him a scholarship to Syracuse University in 1909, where he was a member of the football, baseball, and track and field teams. Leith appeared in the season opener for the 1909 Syracuse Orangemen football team, substituting at quarterback late in the game against Hamilton.

== Coaching career ==
Leith returned to Michigan in 1910 to coach at the high school in Albion, Michigan. The following year, he was hired at the athletic director at Adrian College in Adrian, Michigan. His time as Adrian coach was marked with success but also mired in controversy. In 1911, the Adrian football team was forced to forfeit its win over Hillsdale due to ineligible players. Two of Adrian's star players were deemed academically ineligible by the Adrian faculty after it was determined they forged credits to gain admittance to the college. Within two minutes of the game's start, however, Leith ordered the two men in the game in order to stop Hillsdale from scoring. Leith only admitted to the ruse after severe cross-examination by the Michigan Intercollegiate Athletic Association (MIAA) board. Adrian was expelled from the conference after the incident and was only invited back after Leith resigned in 1913. Leith organized and held the first invitational track and field competition at a Michigan private college while at Adrian.

In the fall of 1913, Leith coached the football team at Cleary Business College—now known as Cleary University—Ypsilanti, Michigan. In 1914, he coached the Mack Park Maroons, who played the Detroit Heralds for the city championship of Detroit. In early 1915, Leith was hired as track coach at the Detroit University School. There he again became embroiled in an eligibility scandal. His team was denied entry to an invitational by the MIAA because one of his athletes was not eligible, but Leith contended that he would not have entered the athlete. In 1920, he coached football at Brighton High School in Brighton, Michigan.

== Later career ==
Leith was involved in real estate in the Brighton area and, in 1921, opened the Michigan Military Academy in Island Lake.

Leith served as mayor for the city of Brighton. winning reelection in 1949. He then campaigned for the 1950 Republican nomination for Governor of Michigan. His stated goals were "take state government out of the red and take the Reds out of state government." Leith received 8,460 votes, just 1.52% of the total vote, losing to Harry Kelly.

== Personal life ==
Leith married Ethel Duncan (1890–1982) in 1909, while they were students at Michigan State Normal College. They eloped and only told their families five months later. The couple had two daughters, Dorothy Louise (1910–1973) and Clara Jean (1911–1982).

Leith died on August 24, 1960, at age 71.

== Head coaching record ==
=== College football ===
| Year | Team | Overall | Conference | Standing | Bowl/playoffs |
|---|---|---|---|---|---|
Adrian Bulldogs (Michigan Intercollegiate Athletic Association) (1911–1912)
| 1911 | Adrian | 7–1 | 3–1 | T–1st | |
| 1912 | Adrian | 5–3 | | | |
| Adrian: | | 12–4 | | | |
| Total: | | | | | |
National championship Conference title Conference division title or championship game berth
