= William C. Vandenberg =

American politician

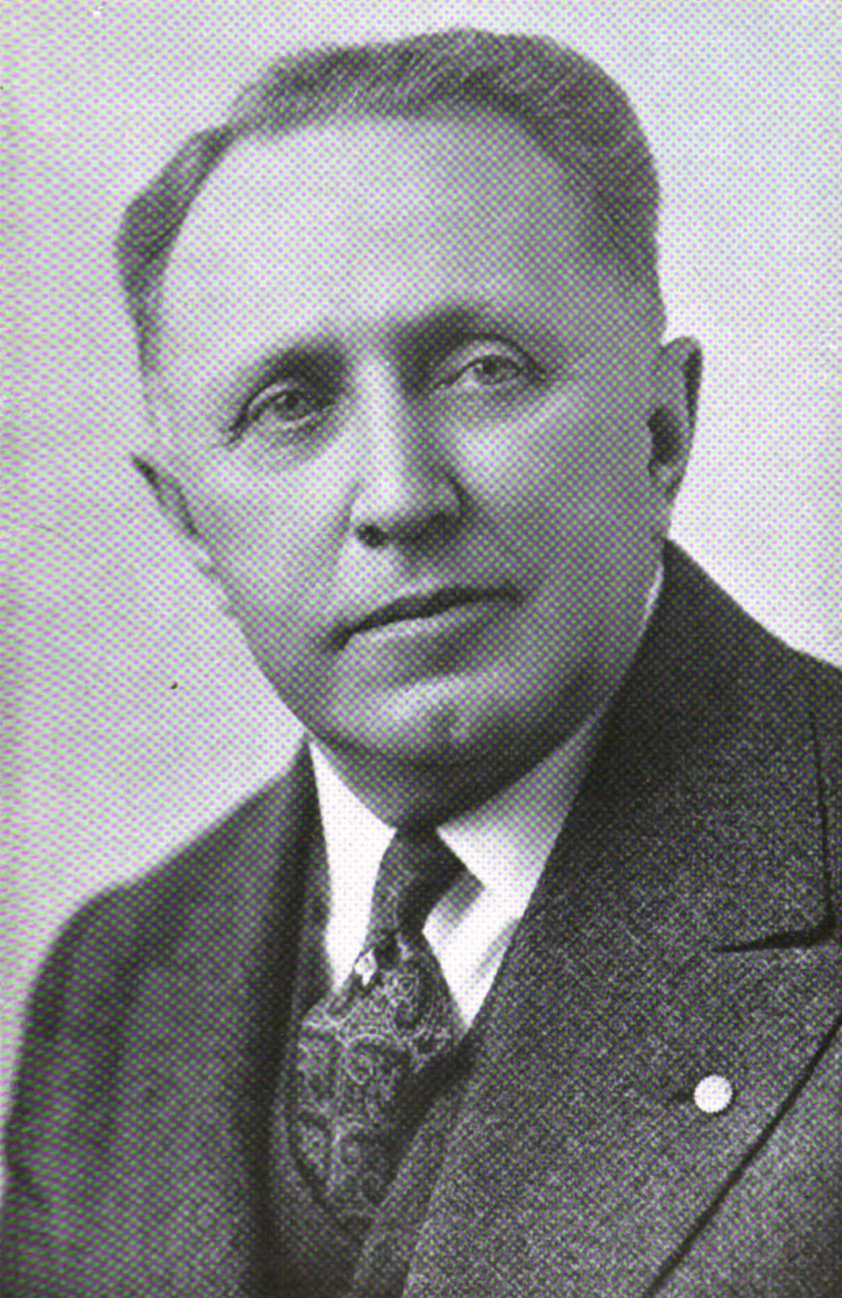

49th Lieutenant Governor of Michigan
- In office 1951–1953
- Governor: G. Mennen Williams
- Preceded by: John W. Connolly
- Succeeded by: Clarence A. Reid

Member of the Michigan Senate from the 23rd district
- In office January 3, 1945 – 1950
- Preceded by: Frank E. McKee
- Succeeded by: Frank E. McKee

Personal details
- Born: October 3, 1884 Holland, Michigan, US
- Died: June 9, 1971 (aged 86) Holland, Michigan, US
- Party: Republican
- Spouse: Florence Fairbanks (m.1909)
- Children: 2
- Education: Holland High School; Voorheis' Business College

William C. Vandenberg Sr. (October 3, 1884 – June 9, 1971) was the 49th lieutenant governor of Michigan.

== Early life ==
Vandenberg was born on October 3, 1884, in Holland, Michigan. Vandenberg graduated Holland High School in 1904, and then started to attend Voorheis' Business College in Indianapolis, Indiana.

== Career ==
Vandenberg founded the Vandenburg Oil Company and oversaw its function from 1919 until it closed in 1946. Vandenberg was served as a member of the Michigan Senate from the 23rd district from 1945 to 1950. From 1951 to 1953, Vandenberg served as the lieutenant governor. In 1952, Vandenberg was a failed candidate in the Republican primary for the 1952 Michigan gubernatorial election.

== Personal life ==
Vandenberg married Florence Fairbanks in 1909. Together they had two children. Vandenberg was Methodist.

== Death ==
Vandenberg died of a heart attack on June 9, 1971, in Holland, Michigan. Vandenberg was dead upon arrival at Holland Hospital. Vandenberg is interred at the Pilgrim Home Cemetery in Holland, Michigan.

Party political offices
Preceded by Eugene C. Keyes	Republican nominee for Lieutenant Governor of Michigan; 1950	Succeeded by Clarence A. Reid
