= Senator Hannan =

Senator Hannan or Hannon may refer to:

- Beverly Hannon (born 1932), Iowa State Senate
- George Hannan (1910–2009), Senate of Australia
- James P. Hannan (1918–1987), Michigan State Senate
- Joseph Hannan (1875–1943), Senate of Australia
- Kemp Hannon (born 1946), New York State Senate
- Lenn Hannon (1943–2010), Oregon State Senate
