= Albert Cobo =

American politician

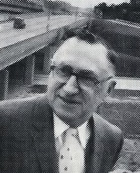

62nd Mayor of Detroit
- In office January 3, 1950 – September 12, 1957
- Preceded by: Eugene Van Antwerp
- Succeeded by: Louis Miriani

24th President of the National League of Cities
- In office 1952
- Preceded by: William F. Devin
- Succeeded by: William B. Hartsfield

City Treasurer of Detroit
- In office January 1936 – January 1950

Personal details
- Born: October 2, 1893 Detroit, Michigan, U.S.
- Died: September 12, 1957 (aged 63) Detroit, Michigan, U.S.
- Party: Republican

Albert Eugene Cobo (October 2, 1893 – September 12, 1957) was an American politician who served as mayor of Detroit from 1950 until his death in 1957.

== Early and personal life ==
Albert Cobo was born in Detroit on October 2, 1893. He married his childhood sweetheart, Ethel; the couple had two daughters, Jean and Elaine.

== Early career ==
Cobo opened and ran two candy stores in Detroit, while attending night school to study business administration and accounting at the Detroit Business Institute. After completing his studies, he sold his stores and went to work for Burroughs Corporation, working his way up to an executive position. In 1933 during the Great Depression, the Burroughs Adding Machine Co. lent Cobo, an accountant, to the city for six months to help it fix its troubled books. He subsequently ran for and was elected Detroit City Treasurer in 1935.

As treasurer he helped keep tax-delinquent Detroiters in their homes through a seven-year tax payment plan. The move helped endear him to voters, and, after seven terms as treasurer, he was elected mayor in 1949.

== Career as mayor ==
=== Election ===
Albert Cobo began his career as Detroit's mayor in 1949 after defeating Liberal Common Council member George Edwards. Edwards, an activist for the United Automobile Workers (UAW), public housing administrator and democratic proponent of the New Deal represented Cobo’s antithesis. Cobo embodied a Republican, corporate executive, real estate investor who adamantly focused his campaign on race and public housing. Cobo, a fiscal conservative, translated his past career as a utility company executive into politics through a strong mistrust of government, economic intervention and deep confidence in the unhindered operation of a free market. While his opponent George Edwards openly supported the provision of public housing for families in any neighborhood of Detroit, Cobo adamantly opposed so called "Negro invasions" thought to occur through public housing. White neighborhood improvement associations strongly endorsed Cobo, motivated by the threat of public housing, allowing him to sweep largely white precincts in the Northeast and Northwest sides. Cobo won the election in a Democratic city and dominated union voters. He was elected twice more, in 1951 and 1953 (the latter time for a four-year term).

=== Public housing ===
Cobo's election facilitated the successful prominence of civic associations. Once elected, Cobo pledged “it will not be the purpose of the administration to scatter public housing projects throughout the city, just because funds may be forthcoming from the Federal Government. I WILL NOT APPROVE Federal Housing Projects in the outlying single home areas.” Cobo justified his staunch opposition by rationalizing it as protecting the rights and consideration of people that move and invest in single-family areas. Twelve proposals for public housing in Detroit were under consideration when Cobo was elected mayor, and he adamantly opposed the construction of all but four sites—all in city centers with a large black population. By slowing and stopping the construction process for public housing and placing single-family home developer Harry J. Durbin in charge of the Detroit Housing Commission, Cobo significantly limited the housing options for poor families in 1950s Detroit. Accordingly, Cobo once said in a radio interview, "The people who pay taxes want better services for their money", touting as justification for his actions that private property owners, and not public housing benefactors, were the ones primarily paying the city taxes. Cobo’s stance on public housing was applauded by real estate groups, Roman Ceglowski (president of the Detroit Civic League), and Orville Tengalia (president of the Southwest Detroit Improvement League). Only 8,155 public housing units were constructed between 1937 and 1955. Jeffries, Brewster, and Douglass Homes, high-density complexes constructed in the inner city, represented the three largest projects. On a ranking of largest cities based on their ratio of low-rent starts to housing starts Detroit was ranked 18th out of 25. Cobo’s successful dismantling of public housing programs instilled in Ralph Smith, president of the Michigan Council of Civic Associations, confidence that “minority pressure groups” would “collapse.”

=== Appointees ===
Cobo appointed non-career officials with strong business background to many key positions in the administration of Detroit. Cobo’s actions lead James Inglis, who was head of the Detroit Housing Commission under Mayors Jeffries and Van Antwerp, to resign. After this Cobo restructured the Detroit Housing Office to largely be run by people with real estate and construction industry background. Cobo appointed Harry J. Durbin, former president of the National Association of Home Builders and successful developer, as Inglis's replacement along with Walter Gessell, a real estate giant, and George Isabell, a property manager. Cobo further enforced the interests of private industry and building trades in public city housing policy with two members of the Housing Commission, Ed Thal and Finlay C. Allan, also being officers of the Detroit Building Trades Council of the American Federation of Labor. In 1951, Cobo appointed Alan E. MacNichol, president of the Federated Civic Association of Northwest Detroit, to the City Plan Commission. Cobo continued enhancing private influence through an advisory committee that consulted on city zoning and consisted of Ross Christile of Gratiot from Chalmers Property Owners Association and Alan C. Laird of the Park Drive-Ravendale Improvement Association. Cobo vigorously opposed public housing because he opposed subsidies for poor people in favor of more private developer’s ownership of property.

Arguably, Cobo’s most controversial action represented the appointment of John Laub as head of the Commission of Community Relations (CCR). The Detroit Common Council authorized the restructuring of the Mayor’s Interracial Committee (MIC) into the CCR. The restructuring occurred in response to MIC’s vilification by white Detroiters for its advocacy for civil rights and desegregation of public housing and opposition to restrictive covenants and discrimination. Laub was the president of the pro-Cobo Northwest Civic Federation and a high school coach and counselor. Cobo rejected Beulah Whitby, because of her opposition to segregated public housing, and John Field, the director of the Toledo Human Relations Board.

=== Urban renewal ===
A major aspect of Cobo's campaign and subsequent terms in office involved urban renewal and reinvention of an aging city. Cobo supported urban renewal projects like the Civic Center, Medical Center and apartment projects in the predominantly Black inner city for middle-income families.

=== Schoolcraft Gardens ===
Cobo’s stopping of plans for the Schoolcraft Gardens Cooperative on Detroit’s far Northwest Side represented a racially fueled and crushing blow to improving housing equality. The project represented a privately funded and well-publicized effort to design a model for “workers” housing in spacious modern townhouses. This construction contrasted the mute, sterile towers of other public housing projects and was backed by the UAW who resisted pressure from community groups to restrict the development to whites. The project’s advocates viewed its fruition as the “[i]deal testing ground to see whether whites and Negroes could live side by side without difficulties.” However, those opposed vocally resisted. William Louks, on behalf of the Detroit Real Estate Board believed that “proponents of the Schoolcraft Gardens sought to inject the century-worn strategy of pitting class against class or race against class or race and to promote the socialistic theory of cooperative society.” Floy McGriff initiated a year long campaign against the project in Northwest Neighborhoods through newspaper articles touting the project as a “socialistic” challenge to the “vested rights” of homeowners. The Tel-Craft Association, led by Northwest Detroit’s Homeowners Association sent over 10,000 postcards of protest to city officials while 12 fundamentalist Christian ministers signed resolutions to condemn the project. These acts did not fall on deaf ears as Cobo agreed with the opposition and vetoed City Council’s authorization of zoning changes to begin construction.

=== Expressway development ===
Cobo also heavily pushed for the expansion of the expressway system; many of his backers were wealthy suburbanites, who wanted a faster, easier commute into the city.

=== Other ===
Cobo served as president of the National League of Cities in 1952.

== Later life ==
Cobo ran on the Republican ticket in 1956 for governor of Michigan, but was handily beaten by G. Mennen Williams, his first loss after ten successful citywide campaigns. He did not seek a fourth term as mayor in 1957.

Cobo served as president of the American Municipal Association and a trustee of the United States Conference of Mayors.

== Legacy ==
Cobo was mayor at the apex of the city's population of about 1.8 million in 1950. He died of a heart attack on September 12, 1957, just months before his last term in office would have ended. Cobo Center (formerly Cobo Hall) was built and named in his honor. However, on August 27, 2019, the facility was renamed the TCF Center. Cobo is interred at Woodlawn Cemetery in Detroit.

Political offices
| Preceded by Eugene Van Antwerp | Mayor of Detroit; January 3, 1950 – September 12, 1957 | Succeeded by Louis Miriani |
Party political offices
| Preceded by Donald S. Leonard | Republican nominee for Governor of Michigan; 1956 | Succeeded by Paul Bagwe |
