= Clarence Reid =

Clarence Reid may refer to:

- Blowfly (musician) (Clarence Henry Reid, 1939–2016), American musician, songwriter and producer
- Clarence A. Reid (1892–1978), lieutenant governor of Michigan
