= 1956 Michigan gubernatorial election =

- November 6, 1956
- Turnout: 47.86%
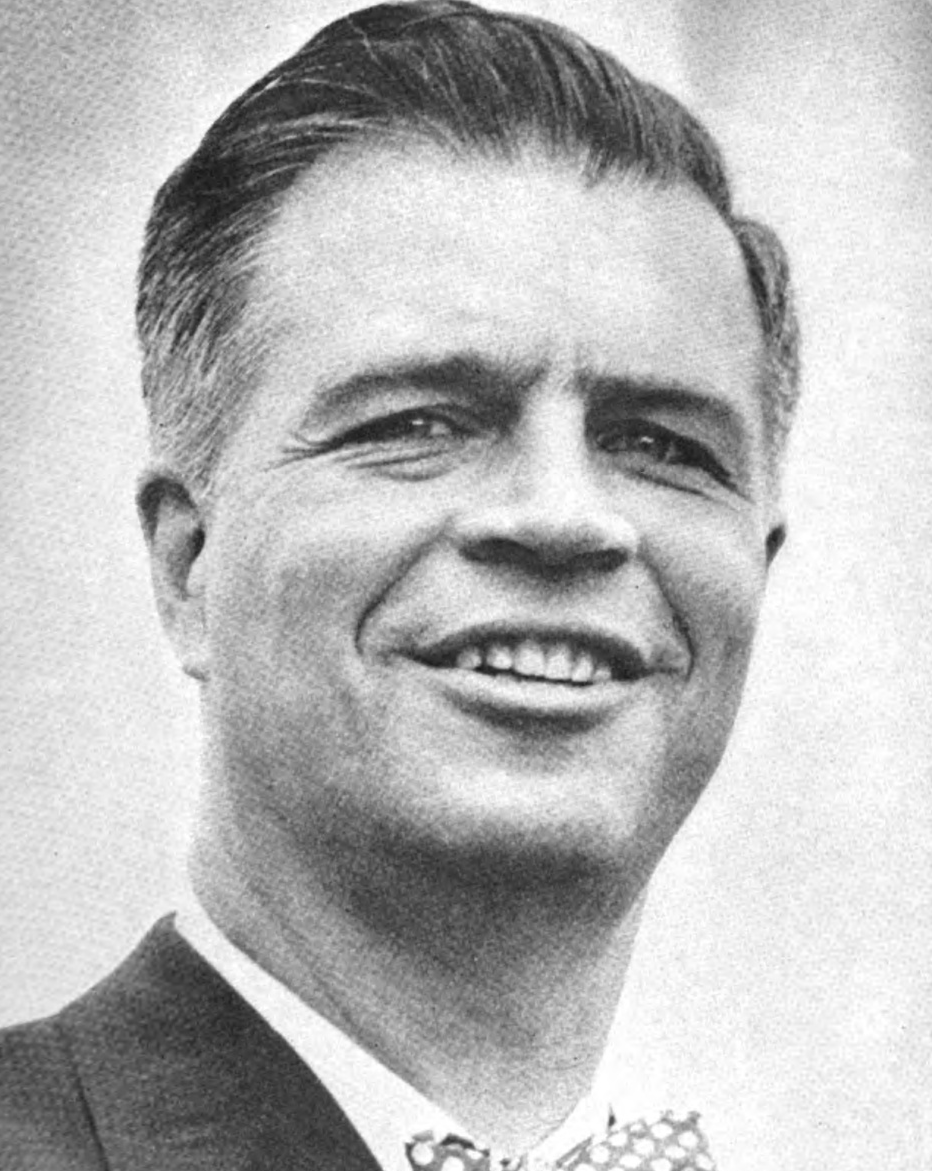

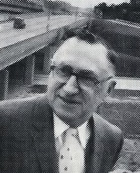
Nominee	G. Mennen Williams	Albert E. Cobo
Party	Democratic	Republican
Popular vote	1,666,689	1,376,376
Percentage	54.65%	45.13%
- County results Williams: 50–60% 60–70% Cobo: 50–60% 60–70%
Governor before election
G. Mennen Williams
Democratic
Elected Governor
G. Mennen Williams
Democratic

The 1956 Michigan gubernatorial election was held on November 6, 1956. Incumbent Democrat G. Mennen Williams defeated Republican nominee Albert E. Cobo with 54.65% of the vote.

== Primary election ==
Michigan held primary elections on August 7, 1956.

=== Democratic party ===
Incumbent governor G. Mennen Williams was renominated for a fifth consecutive term without opposition.

==== Candidates ====
- G. Mennen Williams, incumbent governor

==== Results ====
Democratic primary results
Party	Candidate	Votes	%
Democratic	G. Mennen Williams (inc.)	427,821	99.99%
Democratic	Scattering	16	0.01%
Total votes		427,837	100.00%

=== Republican party ===
Mayor of Detroit Albert E. Cobo defeated Donald S. Leonard for the Republican nomination.

==== Candidates ====
- Albert E. Cobo, mayor of Detroit
- Donald S. Leonard, Republican nominee for governor in 1954

==== Results ====
Republican primary results
Party	Candidate	Votes	%
Republican	Albert E. Cobo	348,652	68.97%
Republican	Donald S. Leonard	156,822	31.02%
Republican	Scattering	17	0.00%
Total votes		505,491	100.00%

== General election ==
=== Candidates ===
Major party candidates

- G. Mennen Williams, Democratic
- Albert E. Cobo, Republican

Other candidates

- Alfred T. Halsted, Prohibition

=== Results ===
1956 Michigan gubernatorial election
Party	Candidate	Votes	%	±%
Democratic	G. Mennen Williams (inc.)	1,666,689	54.65%	−0.96%
Republican	Albert E. Cobo	1,376,376	45.13%	+1.09%
Prohibition	Alfred T. Halsted	6,538	0.21%	−0.05%
	Scattering	48	0.00%	
Majority		290,313	9.52%	
Total votes		3,049,651	100.00%	
Democratic hold		Swing	-2.05%	

==== Results by county ====
County	G. Mennen Williams Democratic		Albert E. Cobo Republican		Alfred T. Halsted Prohibition		Scattering Write-in		Margin		Total votes cast
County	#	%	#	%	#	%	#	%	#	%	Total votes cast
Alcona	1,096	39.97%	1,639	59.77%	7	0.26%	0	0.00%	-543	-19.80%	2,742
Alger	2,699	65.22%	1,426	34.46%	13	0.31%	0	0.00%	1,273	30.76%	4,138
Allegan	7,728	35.40%	14,054	64.38%	47	0.22%	0	0.00%	-6,326	-28.98%	21,829
Alpena	4,460	44.28%	5,606	55.65%	7	0.07%	0	0.00%	-1,146	-11.38%	10,073
Antrim	1,891	38.37%	3,025	61.38%	12	0.24%	0	0.00%	-1,134	-23.01%	4,928
Arenac	2,017	49.46%	2,058	50.47%	3	0.07%	0	0.00%	-41	-1.01%	4,078
Baraga	2,008	56.85%	1,521	43.06%	3	0.08%	0	0.00%	487	13.79%	3,532
Barry	5,304	40.47%	7,745	59.09%	57	0.43%	1	0.01%	-2,441	-18.62%	13,107
Bay	20,595	53.25%	17,972	46.47%	109	0.28%	0	0.00%	2,623	6.78%	38,676
Benzie	1,465	40.37%	2,149	59.22%	15	0.41%	0	0.00%	-684	-18.85%	3,629
Berrien	22,604	42.59%	30,257	57.01%	208	0.39%	0	0.00%	-7,653	-14.42%	53,069
Branch	5,362	42.67%	7,148	56.88%	57	0.45%	0	0.00%	-1,786	-14.21%	12,567
Calhoun	26,497	50.85%	25,469	48.87%	145	0.28%	0	0.00%	1,028	1.97%	52,111
Cass	5,942	44.06%	7,499	55.60%	46	0.34%	0	0.00%	-1,557	-11.54%	13,487
Charlevoix	2,628	45.29%	3,153	54.34%	21	0.36%	0	0.00%	-525	-9.05%	5,802
Cheboygan	2,930	47.38%	3,247	52.51%	7	0.11%	0	0.00%	-317	-5.13%	6,184
Chippewa	5,409	49.86%	5,426	50.02%	13	0.12%	0	0.00%	-17	-0.16%	10,848
Clare	1,809	37.70%	2,976	62.01%	14	0.29%	0	0.00%	-1,167	-24.32%	4,799
Clinton	5,808	40.69%	8,428	59.05%	37	0.26%	0	0.00%	-2,620	-18.36%	14,273
Crawford	857	44.45%	1,068	55.39%	3	0.16%	0	0.00%	-211	-10.94%	1,928
Delta	8,054	57.39%	5,948	42.39%	31	0.22%	0	0.00%	2,106	15.01%	14,033
Dickinson	6,420	57.19%	4,789	42.66%	15	0.13%	1	0.01%	1,631	14.53%	11,225
Eaton	9,038	46.18%	10,494	53.62%	38	0.19%	0	0.00%	-1,456	-7.44%	19,570
Emmet	2,807	42.38%	3,794	57.28%	23	0.35%	0	0.00%	-987	-14.90%	6,624
Genesee	75,369	55.03%	61,339	44.79%	246	0.18%	0	0.00%	14,030	10.24%	136,954
Gladwin	1,587	38.19%	2,559	61.59%	9	0.22%	0	0.00%	-972	-23.39%	4,155
Gogebic	7,496	58.37%	5,325	41.47%	21	0.16%	0	0.00%	2,171	16.91%	12,842
Grand Traverse	5,022	41.25%	7,119	58.48%	32	0.26%	1	0.01%	-2,097	-17.23%	12,174
Gratiot	4,863	36.90%	8,265	62.71%	52	0.39%	0	0.00%	-3,402	-25.81%	13,180
Hillsdale	5,030	36.74%	8,580	62.67%	81	0.59%	0	0.00%	-3,550	-25.93%	13,691
Houghton	8,980	55.05%	7,310	44.81%	23	0.14%	0	0.00%	1,670	10.24%	16,313
Huron	4,671	34.88%	8,708	65.03%	12	0.09%	0	0.00%	-4,037	-30.15%	13,391
Ingham	40,155	49.17%	41,376	50.67%	129	0.16%	0	0.00%	-1,221	-1.50%	81,660
Ionia	7,097	44.88%	8,666	54.80%	50	0.32%	0	0.00%	-1,569	-9.92%	15,813
Iosco	2,370	40.05%	3,537	59.78%	10	0.17%	0	0.00%	-1,167	-19.72%	5,917
Iron	5,624	60.24%	3,697	39.60%	15	0.16%	0	0.00%	1,927	20.64%	9,336
Isabella	5,113	44.64%	6,323	55.21%	17	0.15%	0	0.00%	-1,210	-10.56%	11,453
Jackson	21,110	41.52%	29,587	58.19%	146	0.29%	2	0.00%	-8,477	-16.67%	50,845
Kalamazoo	25,058	41.24%	35,368	58.20%	340	0.56%	1	0.00%	-10,310	-16.97%	60,767
Kalkaska	967	46.67%	1,101	53.14%	4	0.19%	0	0.00%	-134	-6.47%	2,072
Kent	60,963	42.62%	81,617	57.06%	460	0.32%	0	0.00%	-20,654	-14.44%	143,040
Keweenaw	865	57.71%	634	42.29%	0	0.00%	0	0.00%	231	15.41%	1,499
Lake	1,335	50.51%	1,306	49.41%	2	0.08%	0	0.00%	29	1.10%	2,643
Lapeer	5,853	40.92%	8,434	58.96%	18	0.13%	0	0.00%	-2,581	-18.04%	14,305
Leelanau	1,690	40.65%	2,465	59.30%	2	0.05%	0	0.00%	-775	-18.64%	4,157
Lenawee	10,499	36.65%	18,077	63.11%	67	0.23%	0	0.00%	-7,578	-26.46%	28,643
Livingston	5,637	39.99%	8,409	59.66%	50	0.35%	0	0.00%	-2,772	-19.67%	14,096
Luce	1,126	47.87%	1,225	52.08%	1	0.04%	0	0.00%	-99	-4.21%	2,352
Mackinac	2,374	49.86%	2,384	50.07%	3	0.06%	0	0.00%	-10	-0.21%	4,761
Macomb	75,406	62.92%	44,204	36.88%	237	0.20%	0	0.00%	31,202	26.03%	119,847
Manistee	4,003	48.31%	4,276	51.61%	7	0.08%	0	0.00%	-273	-3.29%	8,286
Marquette	12,697	58.08%	9,125	41.74%	38	0.17%	0	0.00%	3,572	16.34%	21,860
Mason	4,637	48.31%	4,949	51.56%	13	0.14%	0	0.00%	-312	-3.25%	9,599
Mecosta	2,880	40.12%	4,279	59.60%	20	0.28%	0	0.00%	-1,399	-19.49%	7,179
Menominee	5,659	52.92%	5,026	47.00%	8	0.07%	0	0.00%	633	5.92%	10,693
Midland	7,064	40.34%	10,418	59.49%	31	0.18%	0	0.00%	-3,354	-19.15%	17,513
Missaukee	1,022	33.68%	1,999	65.89%	13	0.43%	0	0.00%	-977	-32.20%	3,034
Monroe	17,835	54.19%	14,986	45.53%	92	0.28%	0	0.00%	2,849	8.66%	32,913
Montcalm	5,662	41.89%	7,822	57.88%	31	0.23%	0	0.00%	-2,160	-15.98%	13,515
Montmorency	902	45.74%	1,067	54.11%	3	0.15%	0	0.00%	-165	-8.37%	1,972
Muskegon	31,560	56.04%	24,599	43.68%	155	0.28%	0	0.00%	6,961	12.36%	56,314
Newaygo	3,806	38.64%	6,025	61.16%	20	0.20%	0	0.00%	-2,219	-22.53%	9,851
Oakland	124,004	49.27%	127,173	50.53%	499	0.20%	1	0.00%	-3,169	-1.26%	251,677
Oceana	2,593	41.25%	3,663	58.27%	30	0.48%	0	0.00%	-1,070	-17.02%	6,286
Ogemaw	1,800	42.84%	2,393	56.95%	9	0.21%	0	0.00%	-593	-14.11%	4,202
Ontonagon	2,815	54.95%	2,304	44.97%	4	0.08%	0	0.00%	511	9.97%	5,123
Osceola	1,802	32.39%	3,731	67.06%	31	0.56%	0	0.00%	-1,929	-34.67%	5,564
Oscoda	520	39.54%	793	60.30%	2	0.15%	0	0.00%	-273	-20.76%	1,315
Otsego	1,452	48.48%	1,540	51.42%	3	0.10%	0	0.00%	-88	-2.94%	2,995
Ottawa	13,196	34.80%	24,607	64.90%	114	0.30%	0	0.00%	-11,411	-30.09%	37,917
Presque Isle	2,656	53.82%	2,274	46.08%	5	0.10%	0	0.00%	382	7.74%	4,935
Roscommon	1,293	37.35%	2,161	62.42%	8	0.23%	0	0.00%	-868	-25.07%	3,462
Saginaw	32,799	47.68%	35,796	52.03%	198	0.29%	0	0.00%	-2,997	-4.36%	68,793
Sanilac	4,448	31.92%	9,466	67.94%	19	0.14%	0	0.00%	-5,018	-36.02%	13,933
Schoolcraft	2,325	56.61%	1,781	43.36%	1	0.02%	0	0.00%	544	13.25%	4,107
Shiawassee	9,675	45.57%	11,490	54.12%	65	0.31%	0	0.00%	-1,815	-8.55%	21,230
St. Clair	18,009	43.70%	23,152	56.18%	53	0.13%	0	0.00%	-5,143	-12.48%	41,214
St. Joseph	5,896	36.15%	10,347	63.44%	68	0.42%	0	0.00%	-4,451	-27.29%	16,311
Tuscola	5,556	35.33%	10,151	64.55%	20	0.13%	0	0.00%	-4,595	-29.22%	15,727
Van Buren	7,235	38.37%	11,534	61.17%	87	0.46%	0	0.00%	-4,299	-22.80%	18,856
Washtenaw	25,884	44.76%	31,769	54.94%	169	0.29%	4	0.01%	-5,885	-10.18%	57,826
Wayne	759,704	66.72%	377,177	33.12%	1,737	0.15%	37	0.00%	382,527	33.59%	1,138,655
Wexford	3,612	47.30%	3,997	52.34%	27	0.35%	0	0.00%	-385	-5.04%	7,636
Total	1,666,689	54.65%	1,376,376	45.13%	6,538	0.21%	48	0.00%	290,313	9.52%	3,049,651

===== Counties that flipped from Democratic to Republican =====
- Cheboygan
- Chippewa
- Ingham
- Manistee
