= Frederick M. Alger Jr. =

American politician and diplomat (1907–1967)

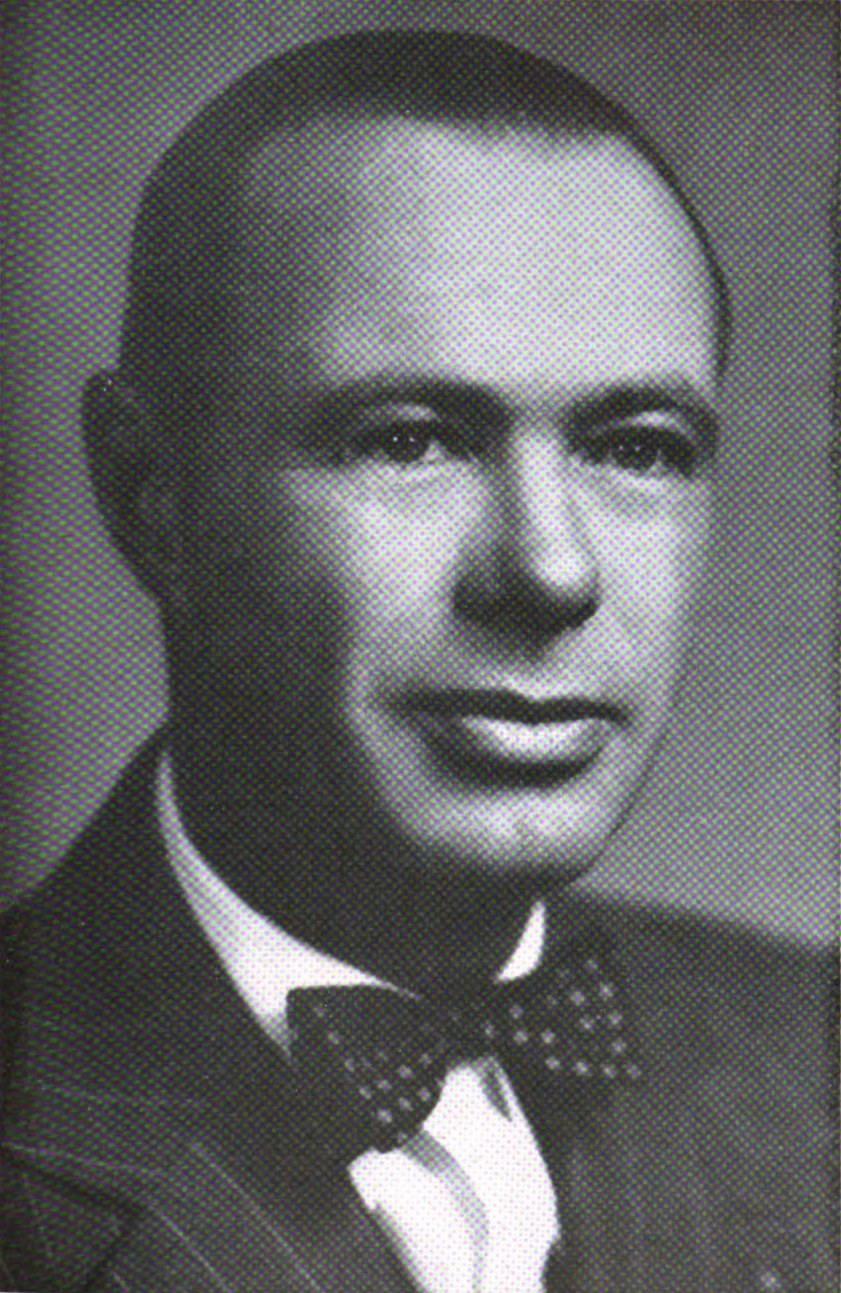

United States Ambassador to Belgium
- In office May 26, 1953 – March 27, 1957
- President: Dwight D. Eisenhower
- Preceded by: Myron M. Cowen
- Succeeded by: John Clifford Folger

Michigan Secretary of State
- In office February 9, 1947 – January 11, 1952
- Governor: Kim Sigler; G. Mennen Williams
- Preceded by: Herman H. Dignan
- Succeeded by: Owen J. Cleary

Personal details
- Born: August 3, 1907 Detroit, Michigan, U.S.
- Died: January 7, 1967 (aged 59) Grosse Pointe, Michigan, U.S.
- Party: Republican
- Spouses: Suzette (m. 1929; died 1963); Katherine (m. 1963)

Military service
- Allegiance: United States Navy
- Battles/wars: World War II

Frederick Moulton Alger Jr. (August 3, 1907 – January 7, 1967) was an American politician and diplomat.

== Early life ==
Alger was born on August 3, 1907, to parents Frederick Moulton and Mary Eldridge Alger in Detroit, Michigan. He was a grandson of Russell A. Alger.

== Military career ==
Alger served in the United States Navy during World War II.

== Political career ==
Alger unsuccessfully ran for the position of United States Representative from Michigan's 14th District in 1936. He received 34.4% of the vote. Alger served as the Michigan Secretary of State from 1947 to 1952. In 1950, Alger ran in the Michigan gubernatorial Republican primary unsuccessfully. Alger was the Republican nominee in the 1952 Michigan gubernatorial election, but was again unsuccessful.

== Diplomatic career ==
Alger was appointed to the position of United States Ambassador to Belgium by President Dwight D. Eisenhower on May 26, 1953. The presentation of his credentials occurred on July 22, 1953. The termination of mission occurred on March 27, 1957.

== Personal life ==
Alger married Suzette de Marigny Dewey in 1929. He was widowed in 1963. Later in the year, he married Katherine Sutton. Alger was a member of a number of organizations including the American Legion, the Elks, the Sons of the American Revolution, Veterans of Foreign Wars, Military Order of the World Wars, and was a Freemason. Alger was Presbyterian.

== Death ==
Alger died on January 7, 1967, in Grosse Pointe, Michigan.

Party political offices
Preceded by Herman H. Dignan	Republican nominee for Michigan Secretary of State; 1946, 1948, 1950	Succeeded by Owen Cleary
Preceded by Harry Kelly	Republican nominee for Governor of Michigan; 1952	Succeeded by Donald S. Leonard
