= 1914 Detroit Heralds season =

Sports season

- Head coach: Bill Marshall
- Home stadium: Packard Park

Results
- Record: 8–0–1

The 1914 Detroit Heralds season was the 10th season for the Detroit Heralds, an independent American football team. Led by coach Bill Marshall, the team compiled an 8–0–1 record, shut out eight opponents, and allowed only six points during the season. After the season ended, sports writer E. A. Batchelor declared the Heralds to be the state's independent football champion and branded coach Marshall "a real football genius".

Having gone undefeated in 1913 as well, the Heralds' 1914 season extended the team's unbeaten streak to 16 games. In addition to facing opponents from within the state, the 1914 Heralds also played an Illinois team (Evanston North Ends) to a scoreless tie and defeated one Canadian team and three Ohio teams: Windsor (33–0); Cleveland Erin Braus (13–0); Cincinnati Celts (13–0); and Massillon Tigers (19–0).

== Schedule ==
| Date | Opponent | Site | Result | Attendance | Source |
|---|---|---|---|---|---|
| October 4 | Jackson | Packard Park; Detroit | W 67–0 | 1,000 | |
| October 11 | Cleveland Erin Braus | Packard Park; Detroit | W 13–0 | | |
| October 18 | Windsor | Packard Park; Detroit | W 33–0 | 2,800 | |
| October 25 | Cincinnati Celts | Packard Park; Detroit | W 13–0 | | |
| November 1 | Massillon Tigers | Packard Park; Detroit | W 19–0 | | |
| November 8 | Flint Independents | Packard Park; Detroit | W 23–0 | | |
| November 15 | Evanston North Ends | Packard Park; Detroit | T 0–0 | 600 | |
| November 22 | Mack Park Maroons | Packard Park; Detroit | W 10–0 | 5,000 | |
| November 29 | Ann Arbor Independents | Detroit | W 7–6 | 3,500 | |

== Players ==
The team's players included the following, those players with at least four starts shown in bold:

- Pat Dunne - started 7 games at fullback, 1 game at end
- Ell (?) - started 2 games at fullback, 1 game at guard
- Hurley - started 1 game at end
- King - started 1 game at guard
- Latham - started 3 games at quarterback
- **Birtie Maher** - started all 9 games at halfback
- **Mitchell** - started 6 games at guard
- **Moran** - started 4 games at guard
- Mouat - started 1 game at halfback
- **Lawrence Nadeau** - started 8 games at end
- **H. Schlee** - started 8 games at tackle
- **G. Shields** - started all 9 games at tackle
- **R. "Dick" Shields** - started all 9 games at end; also team captain
- **Archie "Dutch" Stewart** - started 8 games at center
- **Wayne** - started 6 games at guard
- **"Hubby" Weekes** - started 5 games at quarterback (previously a star at Eastern High School)
- **Percy Wilson** - started 7 games at halfback, 1 game at quarterback
