= James P. Hannan =

American politician

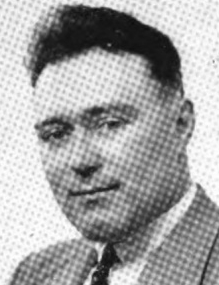

Member of the Michigan Senate from the 18th district
- In office January 1, 1949 – 1950
- Preceded by: Clarence A. Reid
- Succeeded by: Clarence A. Reid

Personal details
- Born: July 5, 1918 Buffalo, New York
- Died: October 1987 (aged 69)
- Party: Democratic
- Spouse: Marion Davis
- Children: Patricia Hannan, James Hannan, Kathleen Hannan, John Hannan, Elizabeth Culver-Bombard, David Hannan
- Education: Wayne State University

Military service
- Allegiance: United States
- Branch/service: United States Army
- Battles/wars: World War II

James P. Hannan (July 5, 1918 – October 1987) was a Michigan politician.

== Early life ==
Hannan was born in Buffalo, New York on July 5, 1918. Hannan graduated from elementary school in Golden, Colorado and from high school in Milan, Michigan. Hannan earned a Bachelor of Laws from Wayne State University.

== Military career ==
Hannan served in the United States Army during World War II.

== Career ==
Hannan was a lawyer. On November 2, 1948, Hannan was elected to the position of member of the Michigan Senate from the 18th district. He was sworn in on January 5, 1949 and served until 1950. Hannan was an unsuccessful candidate in the Democratic primary for the position of member of the United States House of Representatives from Michigan's 17th district in 1952.

== Death ==
Hannan died in October 1987. His last residence was Pearce, Arizona.
