= 1954 Michigan gubernatorial election =

- November 2, 1954
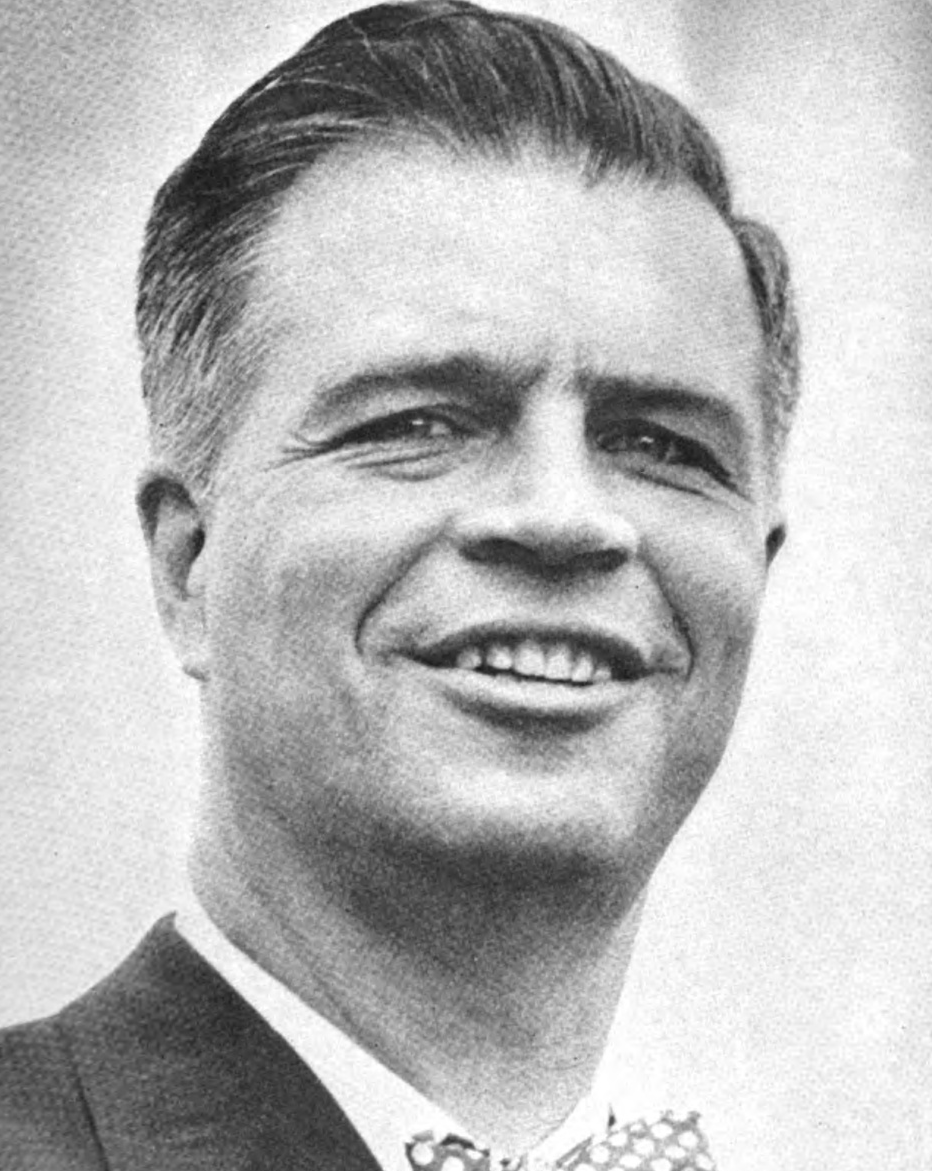

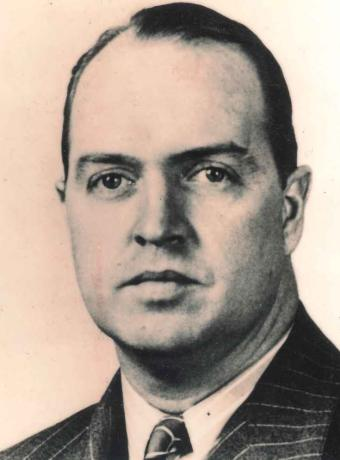
Nominee	G. Mennen Williams	Donald S. Leonard
Party	Democratic	Republican
Popular vote	1,216,308	963,300
Percentage	55.61%	44.05%
- County results Williams: 50–60% 60–70% Leonard: 50–60% 60–70%
Governor before election
G. Mennen Williams
Democratic
Elected Governor
G. Mennen Williams
Democratic

The 1954 Michigan gubernatorial election was held on November 2, 1954. Incumbent Democrat G. Mennen Williams defeated Republican nominee Donald S. Leonard with 55.61% of the vote.

== Primary election ==
Michigan held primary elections on August 3, 1954.

=== Democratic party ===
Incumbent governor G. Mennen Williams was renominated for a fourth consecutive term without opposition.

==== Candidates ====
- G. Mennen Williams, incumbent governor

==== Results ====
Democratic primary results
Party	Candidate	Votes	%
Democratic	G. Mennen Williams (inc.)	426,660	99.99%
Democratic	Scattering	20	0.01%
Total votes		426,680	100.00%

=== Republican party ===
Donald S. Leonard, who lost the Republican gubernatorial primary in the previous election, secured the Republican primary from a crowded field.

==== Candidates ====
- D. Hale Brake, Michigan State Treasurer
- Owen J. Cleary, Michigan Secretary of State
- Eugene C. Keyes, former Lieutenant Governor of Michigan
- Donald S. Leonard, former Chief of the Detroit Police Department and former Michigan State Police commissioner

==== Results ====
Republican primary results
Party	Candidate	Votes	%
Republican	Donald S. Leonard	188,054	40.25%
Republican	D. Hale Brake	112,797	24.14%
Republican	Owen J. Cleary	95,825	20.51%
Republican	Eugene C. Keyes	70,569	15.10%
Republican	Scattering	19	0.00%
Total votes		467,264	100.00%

== General election ==
=== Candidates ===
Major party candidates

- G. Mennen Williams, Democratic
- Donald S. Leonard, Republican

Other candidates

- E. Harold Munn, Prohibition
- Theos A. Grove, Socialist Labor
- Frank Lovell, Socialist Workers

=== Results ===
1954 Michigan gubernatorial election
Party	Candidate	Votes	%	±%
Democratic	G. Mennen Williams (inc.)	1,216,308	55.61%	+5.65%
Republican	Donald S. Leonard	963,300	44.05%	−5.61%
Prohibition	E. Harold Munn	5,824	0.27%	
Socialist Labor	Theos A. Grove	980	0.04%	+0.00%
Socialist Workers	Frank Lovell	615	0.03%	+0.01%
Majority		253,008	11.57%	
Total votes		2,187,027	100.00%	
Democratic hold		Swing	+11.27%	

==== Results by county ====
After this election, Cheboygan County, Ingham County, and Manistee County would not vote Democratic again until 1982.

County	G. Mennen Williams Democratic		Donald S. Leonard Republican		All Others Various		Margin		Total votes cast
County	#	%	#	%	#	%	#	%	Total votes cast
Alcona	958	41.58%	1,336	57.99%	10	0.43%	-378	-16.41%	2,304
Alger	2,290	64.36%	1,256	35.30%	12	0.34%	1,034	29.06%	3,558
Allegan	5,532	34.83%	10,308	64.91%	41	0.26%	-4,776	-30.07%	15,881
Alpena	3,471	47.49%	3,827	52.36%	11	0.15%	-356	-4.87%	7,309
Antrim	1,497	39.21%	2,305	60.37%	16	0.42%	-808	-21.16%	3,818
Arenac	1,705	48.44%	1,808	51.36%	7	0.20%	-103	-2.93%	3,520
Baraga	2,090	59.89%	1,396	40.00%	4	0.11%	694	19.89%	3,490
Barry	3,552	37.93%	5,756	61.46%	57	0.61%	-2,204	-23.53%	9,365
Bay	15,702	54.81%	12,872	44.93%	72	0.25%	2,830	9.88%	28,646
Benzie	1,137	39.70%	1,690	59.01%	37	1.29%	-553	-19.31%	2,864
Berrien	17,472	45.10%	21,212	54.76%	53	0.14%	-3,740	-9.65%	38,737
Branch	3,877	41.07%	5,505	58.31%	59	0.62%	-1,628	-17.24%	9,441
Calhoun	18,581	50.94%	17,775	48.73%	119	0.33%	806	2.21%	36,475
Cass	4,717	45.25%	5,680	54.49%	27	0.26%	-963	-9.24%	10,424
Charlevoix	2,065	44.46%	2,549	54.88%	31	0.67%	-484	-10.42%	4,645
Cheboygan	2,804	52.65%	2,502	46.98%	20	0.38%	302	5.67%	5,326
Chippewa	4,503	50.93%	4,326	48.93%	13	0.15%	177	2.00%	8,842
Clare	1,349	38.41%	2,158	61.45%	5	0.14%	-809	-23.04%	3,512
Clinton	3,697	37.00%	6,256	62.60%	40	0.40%	-2,559	-25.61%	9,993
Crawford	706	48.22%	753	51.43%	5	0.34%	-47	-3.21%	1,464
Delta	7,204	61.91%	4,417	37.96%	15	0.13%	2,787	23.95%	11,636
Dickinson	6,026	61.26%	3,800	38.63%	10	0.10%	2,226	22.63%	9,836
Eaton	6,190	44.20%	7,763	55.44%	50	0.36%	-1,573	-11.23%	14,003
Emmet	2,532	44.62%	3,125	55.08%	17	0.30%	-593	-10.45%	5,674
Genesee	51,339	56.35%	39,513	43.37%	261	0.29%	11,826	12.98%	91,113
Gladwin	1,394	41.33%	1,963	58.20%	16	0.47%	-569	-16.87%	3,373
Gogebic	7,498	63.64%	4,252	36.09%	32	0.27%	3,246	27.55%	11,782
Grand Traverse	3,678	40.72%	5,336	59.07%	19	0.21%	-1,658	-18.35%	9,033
Gratiot	3,473	35.49%	6,263	64.00%	50	0.51%	-2,790	-28.51%	9,786
Hillsdale	4,717	38.89%	7,242	59.70%	171	1.41%	-2,525	-20.82%	12,130
Houghton	7,958	56.62%	6,074	43.21%	24	0.17%	1,884	13.40%	14,056
Huron	3,603	33.34%	7,184	66.47%	21	0.19%	-3,581	-33.13%	10,808
Ingham	29,444	50.44%	28,724	49.21%	206	0.35%	720	1.23%	58,374
Ionia	5,618	45.45%	6,690	54.12%	53	0.43%	-1,072	-8.67%	12,361
Iosco	1,727	40.07%	2,579	59.84%	4	0.09%	-852	-19.77%	4,310
Iron	5,257	62.60%	3,118	37.13%	23	0.27%	2,139	25.47%	8,398
Isabella	3,715	44.53%	4,595	55.08%	32	0.38%	-880	-10.55%	8,342
Jackson	15,875	44.12%	19,953	55.46%	151	0.42%	-4,078	-11.33%	35,979
Kalamazoo	16,795	41.00%	24,012	58.61%	161	0.39%	-7,217	-17.62%	40,968
Kalkaska	783	46.91%	881	52.79%	5	0.30%	-98	-5.87%	1,669
Kent	43,802	44.02%	55,284	55.56%	424	0.43%	-11,482	-11.54%	99,510
Keweenaw	840	61.54%	522	38.24%	3	0.22%	318	23.30%	1,365
Lake	1,320	55.32%	1,060	44.43%	6	0.25%	260	10.90%	2,386
Lapeer	4,068	39.15%	6,284	60.48%	39	0.38%	-2,216	-21.33%	10,391
Leelanau	1,226	39.37%	1,882	60.44%	6	0.19%	-656	-21.07%	3,114
Lenawee	7,456	36.96%	12,659	62.76%	56	0.28%	-5,203	-25.79%	20,171
Livingston	3,980	38.04%	6,449	61.64%	34	0.32%	-2,469	-23.60%	10,463
Luce	720	44.33%	903	55.60%	1	0.06%	-183	-11.27%	1,624
Mackinac	1,633	47.58%	1,786	52.04%	13	0.38%	-153	-4.46%	3,432
Macomb	41,161	64.90%	22,063	34.79%	194	0.31%	19,098	30.11%	63,418
Manistee	3,436	51.01%	3,293	48.89%	7	0.10%	143	2.12%	6,736
Marquette	10,866	59.26%	7,448	40.62%	23	0.13%	3,418	18.64%	18,337
Mason	3,588	49.27%	3,683	50.57%	12	0.16%	-95	-1.30%	7,283
Mecosta	2,149	39.15%	3,312	60.34%	28	0.51%	-1,163	-21.19%	5,489
Menominee	5,016	55.40%	4,015	44.35%	23	0.25%	1,001	11.06%	9,054
Midland	4,883	41.73%	6,774	57.89%	44	0.38%	-1,891	-16.16%	11,701
Missaukee	890	32.27%	1,859	67.40%	9	0.33%	-969	-35.13%	2,758
Monroe	12,390	54.36%	10,301	45.19%	103	0.45%	2,089	9.16%	22,794
Montcalm	4,312	42.04%	5,906	57.59%	38	0.37%	-1,594	-15.54%	10,256
Montmorency	719	44.38%	897	55.37%	4	0.25%	-178	-10.99%	1,620
Muskegon	23,022	58.00%	16,458	41.46%	214	0.54%	6,564	16.54%	39,694
Newaygo	2,811	38.34%	4,498	61.35%	23	0.31%	-1,687	-23.01%	7,332
Oakland	75,625	49.67%	76,210	50.05%	428	0.28%	-585	-0.38%	152,263
Oceana	2,056	41.71%	2,849	57.80%	24	0.49%	-793	-16.09%	4,929
Ogemaw	1,447	44.28%	1,798	55.02%	23	0.70%	-351	-10.74%	3,268
Ontonagon	2,604	57.14%	1,949	42.77%	4	0.09%	655	14.37%	4,557
Osceola	1,481	32.95%	2,985	66.41%	29	0.65%	-1,504	-33.46%	4,495
Oscoda	499	43.05%	656	56.60%	4	0.35%	-157	-13.55%	1,159
Otsego	1,221	49.39%	1,247	50.44%	4	0.16%	-26	-1.05%	2,472
Ottawa	12,487	39.69%	18,865	59.96%	111	0.35%	-6,378	-20.27%	31,463
Presque Isle	2,204	54.78%	1,815	45.12%	4	0.10%	389	9.67%	4,023
Roscommon	1,061	39.86%	1,592	59.80%	9	0.34%	-531	-19.95%	2,662
Saginaw	23,829	48.39%	25,183	51.14%	231	0.47%	-1,354	-2.75%	49,243
Sanilac	3,553	30.15%	8,201	69.59%	30	0.25%	-4,648	-39.44%	11,784
Schoolcraft	2,096	56.28%	1,625	43.64%	3	0.08%	471	12.65%	3,724
Shiawassee	6,504	43.64%	8,273	55.50%	128	0.86%	-1,769	-11.87%	14,905
St. Clair	13,858	44.87%	16,986	55.00%	40	0.13%	-3,128	-10.13%	30,884
St. Joseph	4,476	37.19%	7,488	62.22%	71	0.59%	-3,012	-25.03%	12,035
Tuscola	3,631	31.14%	7,999	68.60%	31	0.27%	-4,368	-37.46%	11,661
Van Buren	5,746	39.05%	8,929	60.68%	39	0.27%	-3,183	-21.63%	14,714
Washtenaw	16,896	42.29%	22,933	57.40%	126	0.32%	-6,037	-15.11%	39,955
Wayne	569,298	67.91%	266,284	31.76%	2,777	0.33%	303,014	36.14%	838,359
Wexford	2,917	46.31%	3,343	53.07%	39	0.62%	-426	-6.76%	6,299
Total	1,216,308	55.61%	963,300	44.05%	7,419	0.34%	253,008	11.57%	2,187,027

===== Counties that flipped from Republican to Democratic =====
- Bay
- Calhoun
- Cheboygan
- Chippewa
- Houghton
- Ingham
- Lake
- Manistee
- Menominee
- Monroe
- Presque Isle
- Schoolcraft
