= 1952 Michigan gubernatorial election =

- November 4, 1952
- Turnout: 44.98%
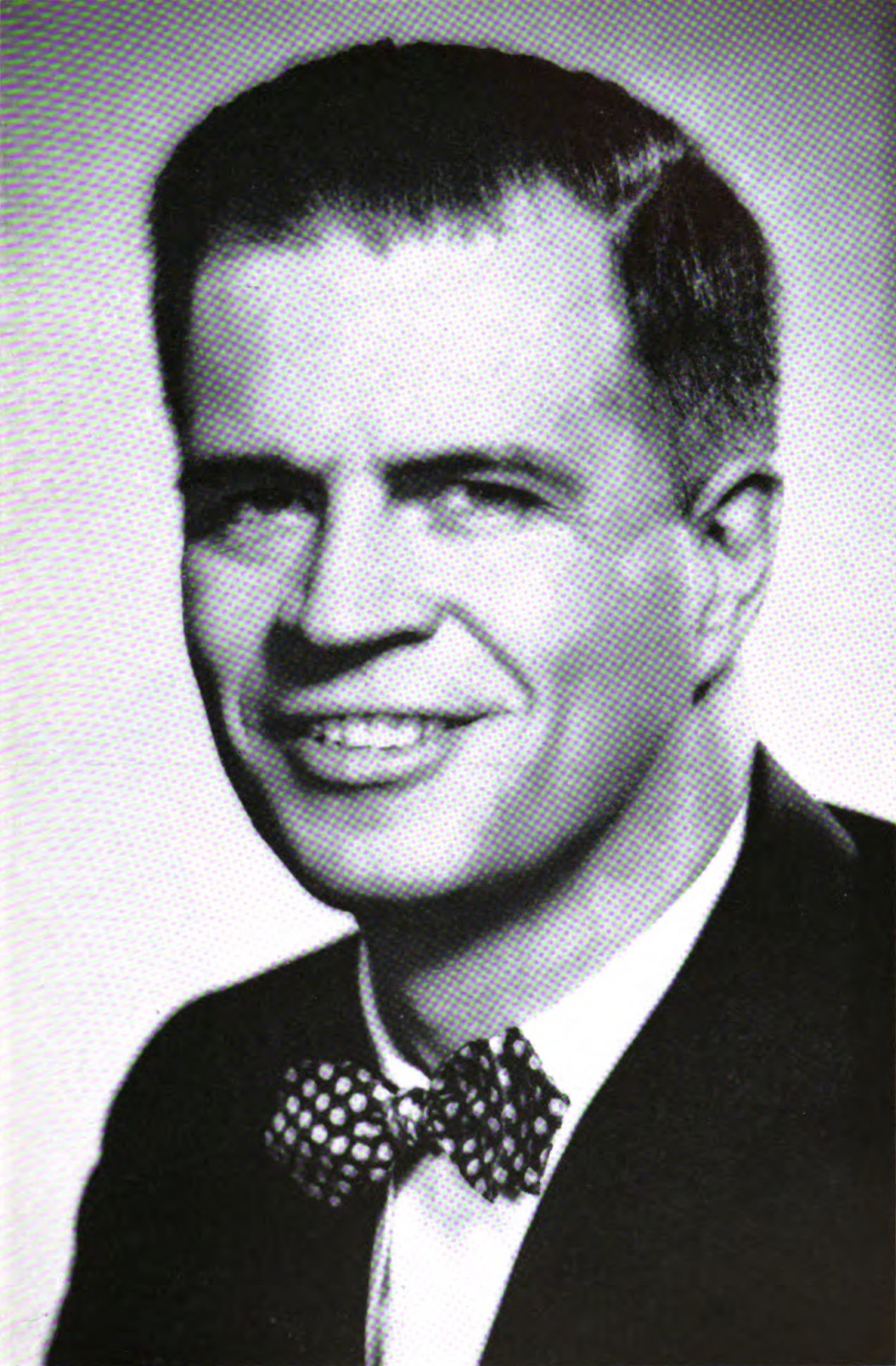

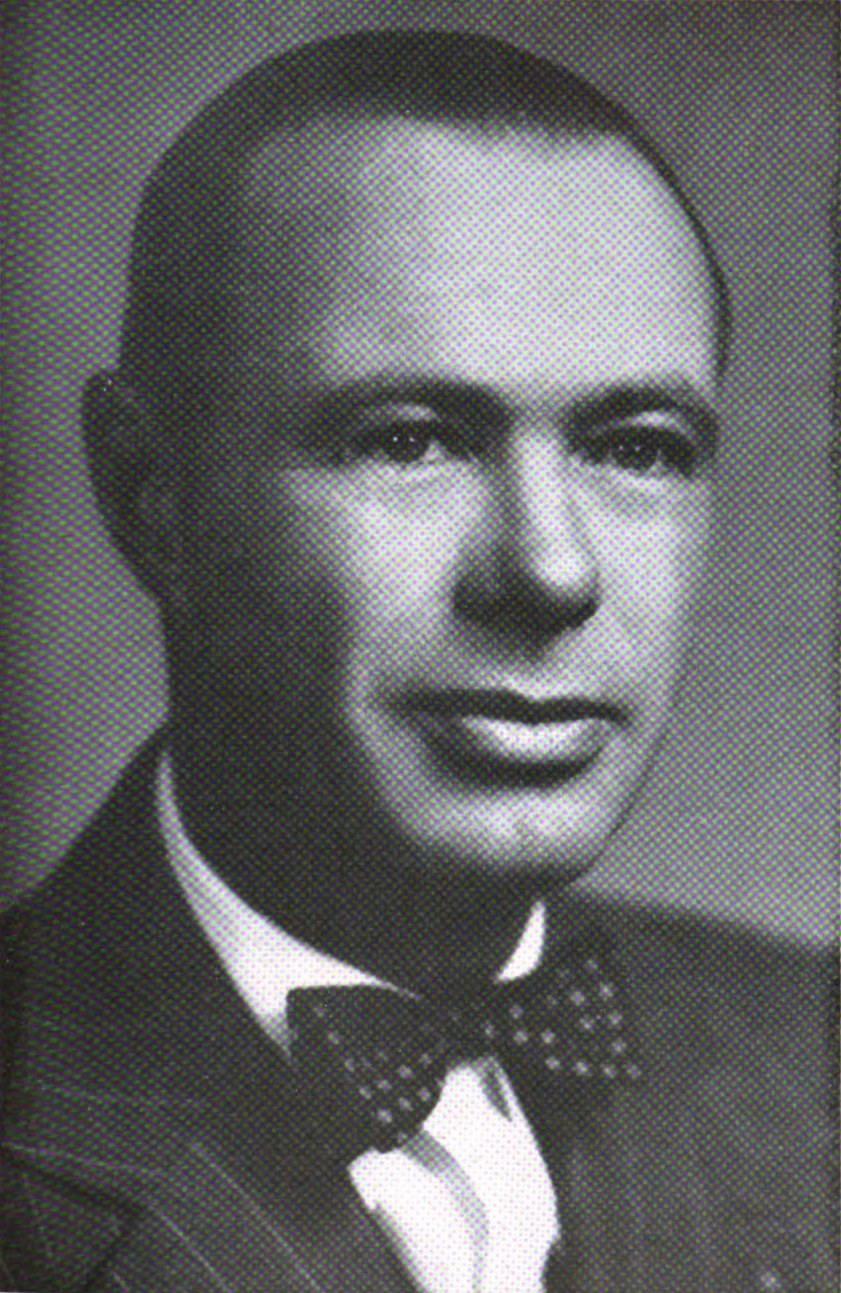
| Nominee | G. Mennen Williams | Frederick M. Alger Jr. |
| Party | Democratic | Republican |
| Popular vote | 1,431,893 | 1,423,275 |
| Percentage | 49.96% | 49.66% |
- County results Williams: 50–60% 60–70% Alger: 40–50% 50–60% 60–70% 70–80%
Governor before election
G. Mennen Williams
Democratic
Elected Governor
G. Mennen Williams
Democratic

The 1952 Michigan gubernatorial election was held on November 4, 1952. Incumbent Democrat G. Mennen Williams defeated Republican nominee Frederick M. Alger Jr. with 49.96% of the vote. With a margin of just 0.30%, this is the second-closest gubernatorial election in Michigan's history, behind only the previous election.

== Primary election ==
Michigan held primary elections on August 5, 1952.

=== Democratic party ===
Incumbent governor G. Mennen Williams was renominated for a third term without opposition.

==== Candidates ====
- G. Mennen Williams, incumbent governor

==== Results ====
Democratic primary results
| Party | Candidate | Votes | % |
|---|---|---|---|
| Democratic | G. Mennen Williams (inc.) | 566,818 | 99.99% |
| Democratic | Scattering | 16 | 0.01% |
| Total votes | | 566,834 | 100.00% |

=== Republican party ===
Former secretary of state Frederick M. Alger Jr., who had lost in the Republican gubernatorial primary in 1950, this time won the Republican nomination.

==== Candidates ====
- Frederick M. Alger Jr., former Michigan Secretary of State
- Donald S. Leonard, former Michigan State Police commissioner
- William C. Vandenberg, Lieutenant Governor of Michigan

==== Results ====
Republican primary results
| Party | Candidate | Votes | % |
|---|---|---|---|
| Republican | Frederick M. Alger Jr. | 384,532 | 44.21% |
| Republican | Donald S. Leonard | 253,703 | 29.17% |
| Republican | William C. Vandenberg | 231,461 | 26.61% |
| Republican | Scattering | 16 | 0.00% |
| Total votes | | 869,712 | 100.00% |

== General election ==
=== Candidates ===
Major party candidates

- G. Mennen Williams, Democratic
- Frederick M. Alger Jr., Republican

Other candidates

- E. Harold Munn, Prohibition
- Theos A. Grove, Socialist Labor
- Howard Lerner, Socialist Workers

=== Results ===
1952 Michigan gubernatorial election
| Party | Candidate | Votes | % | ±% |
|---|---|---|---|---|
| Democratic | G. Mennen Williams (inc.) | 1,431,893 | 49.96% | +0.20% |
| Republican | Frederick M. Alger Jr. | 1,423,275 | 49.66% | −0.04% |
| Prohibition | E. Harold Munn | 8,990 | 0.31% | −0.14% |
| Socialist Labor | Theos A. Grove | 1,192 | 0.04% | −0.02% |
| Socialist Workers | Howard Lerner | 628 | 0.02% | −0.01% |
| | Scattering | 2 | 0.00% | |
| Plurality | | 8,618 | 0.30% | |
| Total votes | | 2,865,980 | 100.00% | |
| Democratic hold | | Swing | +0.24% | |

==== Results by county ====
| County | G. Mennen Williams Democratic | | Frederick M. Alger Republican | | E. Harold Munn Prohibition | | All Others Various | | Margin | | Total votes cast |
| County | # | % | # | % | # | % | # | % | # | % | Total votes cast |
|---|---|---|---|---|---|---|---|---|---|---|---|
| Alcona | 832 | 30.63% | 1.878 | 69.15% | 5 | 0.18% | 1 | 0.04% | -1,046 | -38.51% | 2,716 |
| Alger | 2,346 | 56.72% | 1,772 | 42.84% | 16 | 0.39% | 2 | 0.05% | 574 | 13.88% | 4,136 |
| Allegan | 6,391 | 29.93% | 14,847 | 69.52% | 111 | 0.52% | 7 | 0.03% | -8,456 | -39.60% | 21,356 |
| Alpena | 3,616 | 38.74% | 5,689 | 60.95% | 25 | 0.27% | 4 | 0.04% | -2,073 | -22.21% | 9,334 |
| Antrim | 1,175 | 25.42% | 3,408 | 73.73% | 39 | 0.84% | 0 | 0.00% | -2,233 | -48.31% | 4,622 |
| Arenac | 1,430 | 35.15% | 2,632 | 64.70% | 5 | 0.12% | 1 | 0.02% | -1,202 | -29.55% | 4,068 |
| Baraga | 1,808 | 50.18% | 1,793 | 49.76% | 2 | 0.06% | 0 | 0.00% | 15 | 0.42% | 3,603 |
| Barry | 4,027 | 32.66% | 8,208 | 66.57% | 94 | 0.76% | 1 | 0.01% | -4,181 | -33.91% | 12,330 |
| Bay | 17,341 | 47.01% | 19,468 | 52.77% | 75 | 0.20% | 7 | 0.02% | -2,127 | -5.77% | 36,891 |
| Benzie | 1,173 | 31.46% | 2,520 | 67.58% | 34 | 0.91% | 2 | 0.05% | -1,347 | -36.12% | 3,729 |
| Berrien | 21,456 | 41.10% | 30,575 | 58.57% | 158 | 0.30% | 16 | 0.03% | -9,119 | -17.47% | 52,205 |
| Branch | 4,524 | 34.84% | 8,374 | 64.48% | 86 | 0.66% | 2 | 0.02% | -3,850 | -29.65% | 12,986 |
| Calhoun | 24,450 | 46.46% | 27,930 | 53.08% | 221 | 0.42% | 21 | 0.04% | -3,480 | -6.61% | 52,622 |
| Cass | 5,135 | 38.99% | 7,980 | 60.59% | 51 | 0.39% | 4 | 0.03% | -2,845 | -21.60% | 13,170 |
| Charlevoix | 2,005 | 35.12% | 3,662 | 64.14% | 39 | 0.68% | 3 | 0.05% | -1,657 | -29.02% | 5,709 |
| Cheboygan | 2,235 | 35.58% | 4,034 | 64.23% | 11 | 0.18% | 1 | 0.02% | -1,799 | -28.64% | 6,281 |
| Chippewa | 5,205 | 45.85% | 6,120 | 53.91% | 27 | 0.24% | 0 | 0.00% | -915 | -8.06% | 11,352 |
| Clare | 1,259 | 27.39% | 3,316 | 72.13% | 21 | 0.46% | 1 | 0.02% | -2,057 | -44.75% | 4,597 |
| Clinton | 4,125 | 30.40% | 9,374 | 69.09% | 69 | 0.51% | 0 | 0.00% | -5,249 | -38.69% | 13,568 |
| Crawford | 647 | 35.36% | 1,180 | 64.48% | 3 | 0.16% | 0 | 0.00% | -533 | -29.13% | 1,830 |
| Delta | 8,185 | 56.65% | 6,246 | 43.23% | 17 | 0.12% | 1 | 0.01% | 1,939 | 13.42% | 14,449 |
| Dickinson | 6,757 | 57.67% | 4,935 | 42.12% | 22 | 0.19% | 3 | 0.03% | 1,822 | 15.55% | 11,717 |
| Eaton | 7,104 | 37.35% | 11,826 | 62.17% | 88 | 0.46% | 3 | 0.02% | -4,722 | -24.83% | 19,021 |
| Emmet | 2,424 | 34.53% | 4,577 | 65.20% | 18 | 0.26% | 1 | 0.01% | -2,153 | -30.67% | 7,020 |
| Genesee | 63,655 | 52.68% | 56,636 | 46.87% | 483 | 0.40% | 64 | 0.05% | 7,019 | 5.81% | 120,838 |
| Gladwin | 1,118 | 27.76% | 2,891 | 71.77% | 19 | 0.47% | 0 | 0.00% | -1,773 | -44.02% | 4,028 |
| Gogebic | 7,982 | 58.68% | 5,582 | 41.04% | 34 | 0.25% | 4 (Note: The summary canvass in the 1953-1954 Michigan Manual transposes the votes for Grove and Lerner in this county. The correct results can be found in the detailed results for Gogebic County on page 487.) | 0.03% | 2,400 | 17.64% | 13,602 |
| Grand Traverse | 3,503 | 29.91% | 8,181 | 69.85% | 26 | 0.22% | 2 | 0.02% | -4,678 | -39.94% | 11,712 |
| Gratiot | 3,825 | 29.30% | 9,143 | 70.03% | 88 | 0.67% | 0 | 0.00% | -5,318 | -40.73% | 13,056 |
| Hillsdale | 4,396 | 30.65% | 9,799 | 68.31% | 149 | 1.04% | 0 | 0.00% | -5,403 | -37.67% | 14,344 |
| Houghton | 8,581 | 49.91% | 8,584 | 49.93% | 23 | 0.13% | 4 | 0.02% | -3 | -0.02% | 17,192 |
| Huron | 3,061 | 23.21% | 10,106 | 76.63% | 21 | 0.16% | 0 | 0.00% | -7,045 | -53.42% | 13,188 |
| Ingham | 33,723 | 43.74% | 42,910 | 55.65% | 446 | 0.58% | 27 | 0.04% | -9,187 | -11.91% | 77,106 |
| Ionia | 5,967 | 37.84% | 9,679 | 61.37% | 124 | 0.79% | 1 | 0.01% | -3,712 | -23.54% | 15,771 |
| Iosco | 1,440 | 28.63% | 3,578 | 71.13% | 9 | 0.18% | 3 | 0.06% | -2,138 | -42.50% | 5,030 |
| Iron | 5,465 | 59.34% | 3,725 | 40.45% | 17 | 0.18% | 2 | 0.02% | 1,740 | 18.89% | 9,209 |
| Isabella | 3,975 | 35.52% | 7,158 | 63.96% | 58 | 0.52% | 1 | 0.01% | -3,183 | -28.44% | 11,192 |
| Jackson | 18,774 | 38.15% | 30,229 | 61.43% | 196 | 0.40% | 12 | 0.02% | -11,455 | -23.28% | 49,211 |
| Kalamazoo | 22,961 | 39.43% | 35,002 | 60.11% | 256 | 0.44% | 13 | 0.02% | -12,041 | -20.68% | 58,232 |
| Kalkaska | 592 | 32.39% | 1,227 | 67.12% | 9 | 0.49% | 0 | 0.00% | -635 | -34.74% | 1,828 |
| Kent | 55,647 | 41.38% | 78,117 | 58.09% | 651 | 0.48% | 51 | 0.04% | -22,470 | -16.71% | 134,466 |
| Keweenaw | 825 | 55.44% | 663 | 44.56% | 0 | 0.00% | 0 | 0.00% | 162 | 10.89% | 1,488 |
| Lake | 1,242 | 46.03% | 1,447 | 53.63% | 7 | 0.26% | 2 | 0.07% | -205 | -7.60% | 2,698 |
| Lapeer | 4,599 | 33.59% | 9,032 | 65.98% | 58 | 0.42% | 1 | 0.01% | -4,433 | -32.38% | 13,690 |
| Leelanau | 1,194 | 30.33% | 2,736 | 69.49% | 5 | 0.13% | 2 | 0.05% | -1,542 | -39.17% | 3,937 |
| Lenawee | 9,016 | 31.77% | 19,260 | 67.86% | 96 | 0.34% | 8 | 0.03% | -10,244 | -36.10% | 28,380 |
| Livingston | 4,016 | 30.84% | 8,939 | 68.65% | 65 | 0.50% | 2 | 0.02% | -4,923 | -37.81% | 13,022 |
| Luce | 759 | 35.40% | 1,382 | 64.46% | 2 | 0.09% | 1 | 0.05% | -623 | -29.06% | 2,144 |
| Mackinac | 1,790 | 41.13% | 2,557 | 58.75% | 5 | 0.11% | 0 | 0.00% | -767 | -17.62% | 4,352 |
| Macomb | 43,779 | 56.21% | 33,904 | 43.53% | 142 | 0.18% | 58 | 0.07% | 9,875 | 12.68% | 77,883 |
| Manistee | 3,548 | 42.29% | 4,822 | 57.48% | 18 | 0.21% | 1 | 0.01% | -1,274 | -15.19% | 8,389 |
| Marquette | 11,088 | 51.26% | 10,511 | 48.60% | 28 | 0.13% | 2 | 0.01% | 577 | 2.67% | 21,629 |
| Mason | 4,086 | 42.66% | 5,441 | 56.81% | 46 | 0.48% | 4 | 0.04% | -1,355 | -14.15% | 9,577 |
| Mecosta | 2,063 | 29.20% | 4,949 | 70.04% | 54 | 0.76% | 0 | 0.00% | -2,886 | -40.84% | 7,066 |
| Menominee | 5,225 | 47.63% | 5,713 | 52.08% | 27 | 0.25% | 5 | 0.05% | -488 | -4.45% | 10,970 |
| Midland | 5,374 | 36.09% | 9,435 | 63.37% | 78 | 0.52% | 2 | 0.01% | -4,061 | -27.28% | 14,889 |
| Missaukee | 709 | 22.39% | 2,435 | 76.89% | 23 | 0.73% | 0 | 0.00% | -1,726 | -54.50% | 3,167 |
| Monroe | 14,694 | 48.19% | 15,683 | 51.43% | 96 | 0.31% | 19 | 0.06% | -989 | -3.24% | 30,492 |
| Montcalm | 4,594 | 33.12% | 9,174 | 66.15% | 101 | 0.73% | 0 | 0.00% | -4,580 | -33.02% | 13,869 |
| Montmorency | 647 | 32.30% | 1,343 | 67.05% | 13 | 0.65% | 0 | 0.00% | -696 | -34.75% | 2,003 |
| Muskegon | 29,142 | 54.23% | 24,281 | 45.19% | 267 | 0.50% | 44 | 0.08% | 4,861 | 9.05% | 53,734 |
| Newaygo | 2,969 | 31.79% | 6,324 | 67.71% | 46 | 0.49% | 1 | 0.01% | -3,355 | -35.92% | 9,340 |
| Oakland | 89,815 | 45.63% | 106,447 | 54.08% | 468 | 0.24% | 106 | 0.05% | -16,632 | -8.45% | 196,836 |
| Oceana | 2,315 | 34.94% | 4,215 | 63.61% | 93 | 1.40% | 3 | 0.05% | -1,900 | -28.67% | 6,626 |
| Ogemaw | 1,234 | 30.56% | 2,790 | 69.09% | 14 | 0.35% | 0 | 0.00% | -1,556 | -38.53% | 4,038 |
| Ontonagon | 2,674 | 52.15% | 2,447 | 47.72% | 5 | 0.10% | 2 | 0.04% | 227 | 4.43% | 5,128 |
| Osceola | 1,401 | 23.92% | 4,398 | 75.08% | 59 | 1.01% | 0 | 0.00% | -2,997 | -51.16% | 5,858 |
| Oscoda | 315 | 24.49% | 969 | 75.35% | 2 | 0.16% | 0 | 0.00% | -654 | -50.86% | 1,286 |
| Otsego | 1,003 | 35.59% | 1,805 | 64.05% | 9 | 0.32% | 1 | 0.04% | -802 | -28.46% | 2,818 |
| Ottawa | 10,425 | 30.81% | 23,162 | 68.46% | 234 | 0.69% | 12 | 0.04% | -12,737 | -37.65% | 33,833 |
| Presque Isle | 2,077 | 43.16% | 2,725 | 56.63% | 10 | 0.21% | 0 | 0.00% | -648 | -13.47% | 4,812 |
| Roscommon | 831 | 25.66% | 2,397 | 74.00% | 9 | 0.28% | 2 | 0.06% | -1,566 | -48.35% | 3,239 |
| Saginaw | 27,568 | 42.53% | 36,821 | 56.81% | 271 | 0.42% | 159 | 0.25% | -9,253 | -14.28% | 64,819 |
| Sanilac | 2,884 | 21.22% | 10,643 | 78.30% | 63 | 0.46% | 2 | 0.01% | -7,759 | -57.09% | 13,592 |
| Schoolcraft | 1,987 | 49.00% | 2,060 | 50.80% | 8 | 0.20% | 0 | 0.00% | -73 | -1.80% | 4,055 |
| Shiawassee | 7,786 | 38.67% | 12,168 | 60.43% | 177 | 0.88% | 4 | 0.02% | -4,382 | -21.76% | 20,135 |
| St. Clair | 14,615 | 36.06% | 25,843 | 63.77% | 63 | 0.16% | 4 | 0.01% | -11,228 | -27.71% | 40,525 |
| St. Joseph | 5,426 | 32.15% | 11,291 | 66.91% | 155 | 0.92% | 3 | 0.02% | -5,865 | -34.76% | 16,875 |
| Tuscola | 3,994 | 26.36% | 11,086 | 73.16% | 71 | 0.47% | 2 | 0.01% | -7,092 | -46.80% | 15,153 |
| Van Buren | 6,346 | 33.95% | 12,293 | 65.77% | 45 | 0.24% | 8 | 0.04% | -5,947 | -31.82% | 18,692 |
| Washtenaw | 21,528 | 38.83% | 33,744 | 60.86% | 145 | 0.26% | 26 | 0.05% | -12,216 | -22.03% | 55,443 |
| Wayne | 693,111 | 62.33% | 415,867 | 37.40% | 2,011 | 0.18% | 1,070 | 0.10% | 277,244 | 24.93% | 1,112,059 |
| Wexford | 2,884 | 35.51% | 5,182 | 63.80% | 55 | 0.68% | 1 | 0.01% | -2,298 | -28.29% | 8,122 |
| Total | 1,431,893 | 49.96% | 1,423,275 | 49.66% | 8,990 | 0.31% | 1,822 | 0.06% | 8,618 | 0.30% | 2,865,980 |
