= 1950 Michigan gubernatorial election =

- November 7, 1950
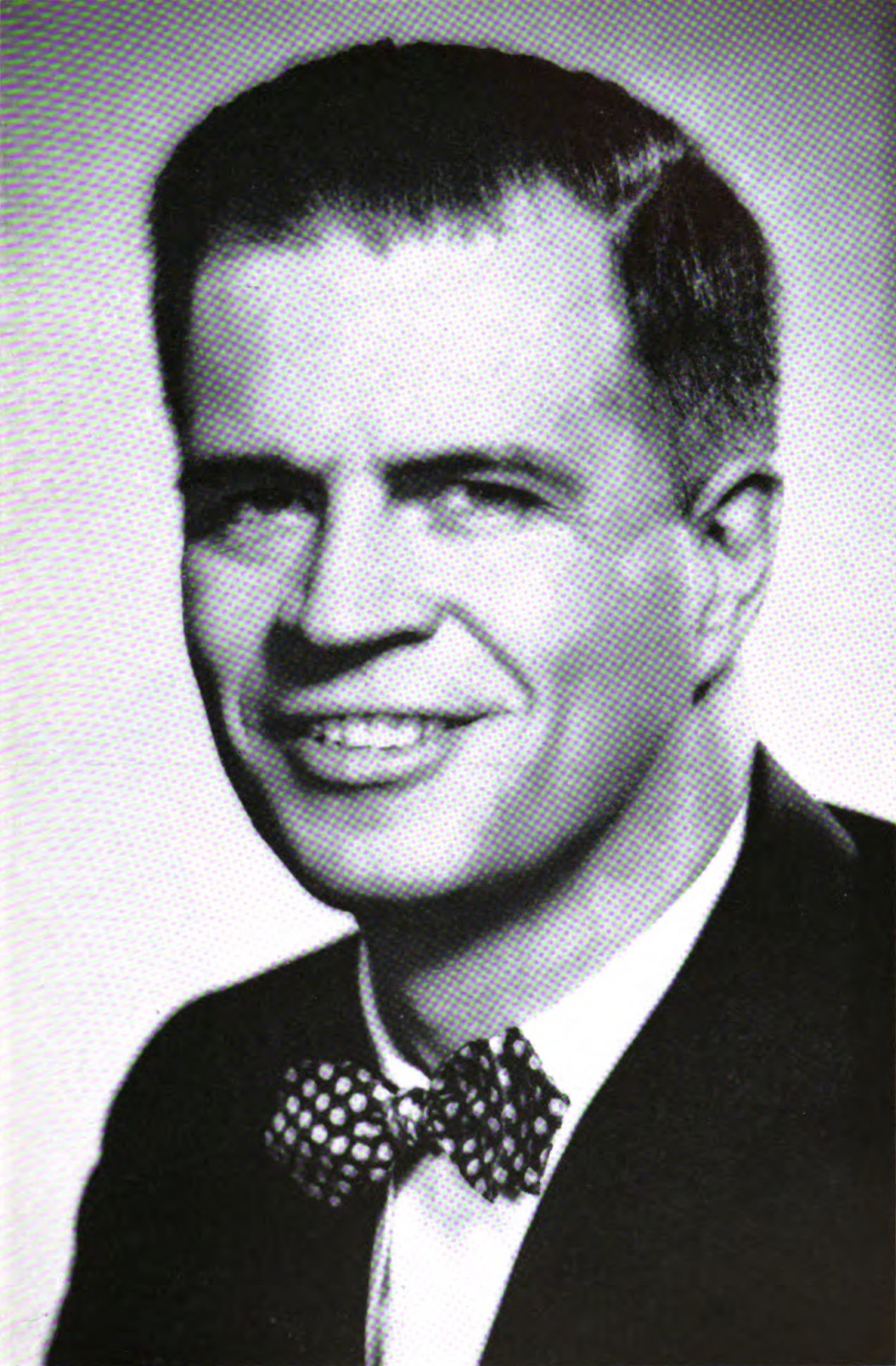

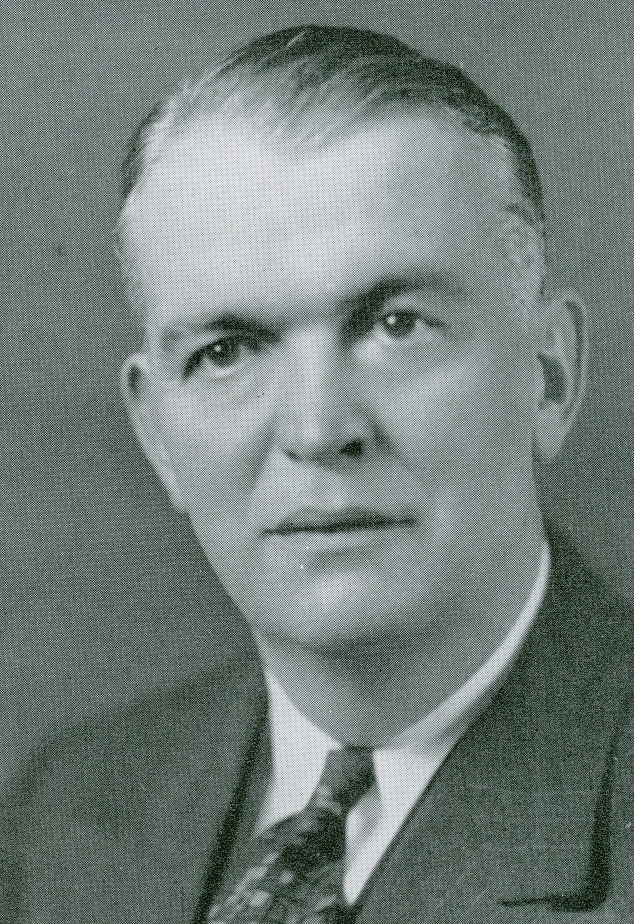
Nominee	G. Mennen Williams	Harry F. Kelly
Party	Democratic	Republican
Popular vote	935,152	933,998
Percentage	49.76%	49.70%
- County results Williams: 50–60% 60–70% Kelly: 50–60% 60–70% 70–80%
Governor before election
G. Mennen Williams
Democratic
Elected Governor
G. Mennen Williams
Democratic

The 1950 Michigan gubernatorial election was held on November 7, 1950. Incumbent Democrat G. Mennen Williams defeated Republican nominee Harry Kelly with 49.76% of the vote. With a margin of only 0.06%, this is the closest gubernatorial election in Michigan's history.

== Primary election ==
Michigan held primary elections on September 12, 1950.

=== Democratic party ===
Incumbent governor G. Mennen Williams was renominated without opposition.

==== Candidates ====
- G. Mennen Williams, incumbent governor

==== Results ====
Democratic primary results
Party	Candidate	Votes	%
Democratic	G. Mennen Williams (inc.)	338,302	99.99%
Democratic	Scattering	13	0.01%
Total votes		338,315	100.00%

=== Republican party ===
Former governor Harry F. Kelly won the Republican nomination over secretary of state Frederick M. Alger Jr. and former lieutenant governor Eugene C. Keyes.

==== Candidates ====
- Frederick M. Alger Jr., Michigan Secretary of State
- Albert J. Engel, representative from Michigan's 9th congressional district
- Harry F. Kelly, former governor
- Eugene C. Keyes, former Lieutenant Governor of Michigan
- Thomas S. Leith, mayor of Brighton

==== Results ====
Republican primary results
Party	Candidate	Votes	%
Republican	Harry F. Kelly	205,889	36.88%
Republican	Frederick M. Alger Jr.	161,827	28.98%
Republican	Eugene C. Keyes	114,711	20.55%
Republican	Albert J. Engel	67,415	12.07%
Republican	Thomas S. Leith	8,460	1.52%
Republican	Scattering	19	0.00
Total votes		558,321	100.00%

== General election ==
=== Candidates ===
Major party candidates

- G. Mennen Williams, Democratic
- Harry Kelly, Republican

Other candidates

- Perry Hayden, Prohibition
- Theos A. Grove, Socialist Labor
- Howard Lerner, Socialist Workers

=== Results ===
1950 Michigan gubernatorial election
Party	Candidate	Votes	%	±%
Democratic	G. Mennen Williams (inc.)	935,152	49.76%	−3.65%
Republican	Harry F. Kelly	933,998	49.70%	+4.04%
Prohibition	Perry Hayden	8,511	0.45%	−0.27%
Socialist Labor	Theos A. Grove	1,077	0.06%	−0.01%
Socialist Workers	Howard Lerner	636	0.03%	−0.01%
	Scattering	8	0.00%	
Plurality		1,154	0.06%	
Total votes		1,879,382	100.00%	
Democratic hold		Swing	-7.69%	

==== Results by county ====
County	G. Mennen Williams Democratic		Harry F. Kelly Republican		Perry Hayden Prohibition		All Others Various		Margin		Total votes cast
County	#	%	#	%	#	%	#	%	#	%	Total votes cast
Alcona	635	31.47%	1,359	67.34%	22	1.09%	2	0.10%	-724	-35.88%	2,018
Alger	2,029	57.35%	1,500	42.40%	9	0.25%	0	0.00%	529	14.95%	3,538
Allegan	4,119	29.43%	9,740	69.58%	131	0.94%	8	0.06%	-5,621	-40.16%	13,998
Alpena	2,617	36.53%	4,520	63.09%	25	0.35%	2	0.03%	-1,903	-26.56%	7,164
Antrim	995	28.96%	2,405	69.99%	36	1.05%	0	0.00%	-1,410	-41.04%	3,436
Arenac	1,150	36.81%	1,960	62.74%	12	0.38%	2	0.06%	-810	-25.93%	3,124
Baraga	2,030	55.39%	1,633	44.56%	1	0.03%	1	0.03%	397	10.83%	3,665
Barry	2,827	33.85%	5,355	64.12%	165	1.98%	5	0.06%	-2,528	-30.27%	8,352
Bay	11,717	46.70%	13,306	53.03%	62	0.25%	6	0.02%	1,589	6.33%	25,091
Benzie	958	32.91%	1,884	64.72%	67	2.30%	2	0.07%	-926	-31.81%	2,911
Berrien	12,315	38.74%	19,374	60.94%	91	0.29%	10	0.03%	-7,059	-22.21%	31,790
Branch	3,334	38.06%	5,306	60.57%	118	1.35%	2	0.02%	-1,972	-22.51%	8,760
Calhoun	13,889	46.00%	16,071	53.22%	218	0.72%	17	0.06%	-2,182	-7.23%	30,195
Cass	3,230	36.84%	5,487	62.58%	45	0.51%	6	0.07%	-2,257	-25.74%	8,768
Charlevoix	1,863	40.01%	2,765	59.39%	28	0.60%	0	0.00%	-902	-19.37%	4,656
Cheboygan	1,985	38.22%	3,188	61.38%	20	0.39%	1	0.02%	-1,203	-23.16%	5,194
Chippewa	4,498	47.82%	4,869	51.76%	33	0.35%	6	0.06%	-371	-3.94%	9,406
Clare	1,073	32.84%	2,164	66.24%	30	0.92%	0	0.00%	-1,091	-33.39%	3,267
Clinton	2,531	28.11%	6,418	71.29%	53	0.59%	1	0.01%	-3,887	-43.17%	9,003
Crawford	583	40.97%	838	58.89%	2	0.14%	0	0.00%	-255	-17.92%	1,423
Delta	6,563	54.99%	5,349	44.82%	21	0.18%	2	0.02%	1,214	10.17%	11,935
Dickinson	6,359	59.42%	4,314	40.31%	23	0.21%	6	0.06%	2,045	19.11%	10,702
Eaton	4,764	38.10%	7,574	60.58%	165	1.32%	0	0.00%	-2,810	-22.47%	12,503
Emmet	2,486	39.60%	3,748	59.70%	42	0.67%	2	0.03%	-1,262	-20.10%	6,278
Genesee	40,432	53.39%	34,963	46.16%	285	0.38%	55	0.07%	5,469	7.22%	75,735
Gladwin	868	30.93%	1,906	67.93%	31	1.10%	1	0.04%	-1,038	-36.99%	2,806
Gogebic	6,622	56.24%	5,125	43.52%	17	0.14%	11	0.09%	1,497	12.71%	11,775
Grand Traverse	2,597	32.77%	5,295	66.82%	27	0.34%	5	0.06%	-2,698	-34.05%	7,924
Gratiot	2,770	30.82%	6,058	67.39%	159	1.77%	2	0.02%	-3,288	-36.58%	8,989
Hillsdale	3,143	32.61%	6,173	64.04%	319	3.31%	4	0.04%	-3,030	-31.43%	9,639
Houghton	6,985	47.95%	7,563	51.92%	14	0.10%	6	0.04%	-578	-3.97%	14,568
Huron	2,692	26.56%	7,386	72.87%	54	0.53%	4	0.04%	-4,694	-46.31%	10,136
Ingham	21,266	42.12%	28,725	56.89%	475	0.94%	27	0.05%	-7,459	-14.77%	50,493
Ionia	4,464	39.22%	6,771	59.49%	144	1.27%	2	0.02%	-2,307	-20.27%	11,381
Iosco	1,169	32.87%	2,363	66.45%	24	0.67%	0	0.00%	-1,194	-33.58%	3,556
Iron	4,493	57.62%	3,272	41.96%	29	0.37%	4	0.05%	1,221	15.66%	7,798
Isabella	2,680	35.55%	4,794	63.59%	64	0.85%	1	0.01%	-2,114	-28.04%	7,539
Jackson	12,626	40.78%	18,020	58.20%	295	0.95%	22	0.07%	-5,394	-17.42%	30,963
Kalamazoo	14,397	40.05%	21,220	59.03%	316	0.88%	13	0.04%	-6,823	-18.98%	35,946
Kalkaska	626	42.33%	845	57.13%	8	0.54%	0	0.00%	-219	-14.81%	1,479
Kent	35,989	41.57%	50,174	57.95%	369	0.43%	51	0.06%	-14,185	-16.38%	86,583
Keweenaw	757	54.11%	640	45.75%	2	0.14%	0	0.00%	117	8.36%	1,399
Lake	970	44.68%	1,185	54.58%	12	0.55%	4	0.18%	-215	-9.90%	2,171
Lapeer	3,660	37.02%	6,157	62.27%	64	0.65%	6	0.06%	-2,497	-25.26%	9,887
Leelanau	1,083	35.96%	1,923	63.84%	6	0.20%	0	0.00%	-840	-27.89%	3,012
Lenawee	6,216	33.47%	12,073	65.00%	278	1.50%	7	0.04%	-5,857	-31.53%	18,574
Livingston	3,036	33.00%	6,077	66.06%	86	0.93%	0	0.00%	-3,041	-33.06%	9,199
Luce	667	37.79%	1,096	62.10%	2	0.11%	0	0.00%	-429	-24.31%	1,765
Mackinac	1,503	41.31%	2,130	58.55%	5	0.14%	0	0.00%	-627	-17.23%	3,638
Macomb	23,582	56.00%	18,407	43.71%	53	0.13%	65	0.15%	5,175	12.29%	42,107
Manistee	3,155	47.35%	3,484	52.29%	18	0.27%	6	0.09%	-329	-4.94%	6,663
Marquette	8,858	50.95%	8,502	48.90%	21	0.12%	4	0.02%	356	2.05%	17,385
Mason	3,129	43.69%	3,978	55.54%	49	0.68%	6	0.08%	-849	-11.85%	7,162
Mecosta	1,626	32.39%	3,327	66.27%	66	1.31%	1	0.02%	-1,701	-33.88%	5,020
Menominee	4,201	47.79%	4,571	52.00%	17	0.19%	1	0.01%	-370	-4.21%	8,790
Midland	3,771	38.46%	5,948	60.67%	81	0.83%	4	0.04%	-2,177	-22.21%	9,804
Missaukee	756	27.77%	1,946	71.49%	20	0.73%	0	0.00%	-1,190	-43.72%	2,722
Monroe	8,994	48.09%	9,600	51.33%	84	0.45%	26	0.14%	-606	-3.24%	18,704
Montcalm	3,463	35.60%	6,192	63.65%	70	0.72%	3	0.03%	-2,729	-28.05%	9,728
Montmorency	643	40.85%	912	57.94%	19	1.21%	0	0.00%	-269	-17.09%	1,574
Muskegon	16,806	52.98%	14,773	46.57%	103	0.32%	39	0.12%	2,033	6.41%	31,721
Newaygo	2,052	32.51%	4,211	66.72%	47	0.74%	1	0.02%	-2,159	-34.21%	6,311
Oakland	47,569	45.67%	56,085	53.85%	415	0.40%	85	0.08%	-8,516	-8.18%	104,154
Oceana	1,724	37.32%	2,798	60.58%	95	2.06%	2	0.04%	-1,704	-23.25%	4,619
Ogemaw	1,116	35.79%	1,979	63.47%	18	0.58%	5	0.16%	-863	-27.68%	3,118
Ontonagon	2,455	52.51%	2,217	47.42%	1	0.02%	2	0.04%	238	5.09%	4,675
Osceola	1,036	24.60%	3,076	73.03%	98	2.33%	2	0.05%	-2,040	-48.43%	4,212
Oscoda	335	32.37%	697	67.34%	3	0.29%	0	0.00%	-362	-34.98%	1,035
Otsego	890	37.47%	1,480	62.32%	5	0.21%	0	0.00%	-590	-24.84%	2,375
Ottawa	8,115	33.14%	16,179	66.06%	181	0.74%	15	0.06%	-8,064	-32.93%	24,490
Presque Isle	1,724	41.70%	2,391	57.84%	18	0.44%	1	0.02%	-667	-16.13%	4,134
Roscommon	691	29.81%	1,616	69.72%	8	0.35%	3	0.13%	-925	-39.91%	2,318
Saginaw	17,023	42.09%	23,093	57.10%	296	0.73%	32	0.08%	-6,070	-15.01%	40,444
Sanilac	2,594	23.99%	8,124	75.13%	90	0.83%	5	0.05%	-5,530	-51.14%	10,813
Schoolcraft	1,506	46.87%	1,698	52.85%	4	0.12%	5	0.16%	-192	-5.98%	3,213
Shiawassee	5,276	38.87%	8,152	60.06%	142	1.05%	2	0.01%	-2,876	-21.19%	13,572
St. Clair	10,195	37.98%	16,569	61.72%	78	0.29%	3	0.01%	-6,374	-23.74%	26,845
St. Joseph	3,374	30.12%	7,696	68.71%	130	1.16%	1	0.01%	-4,322	-38.59%	11,201
Tuscola	2,796	27.44%	7,220	70.86%	170	1.67%	3	0.03%	-4,424	-43.42%	10,189
Van Buren	4,462	34.12%	8,552	65.39%	53	0.41%	11	0.08%	-4,090	-31.27%	13,078
Washtenaw	14,355	40.60%	20,821	58.89%	153	0.43%	26	0.07%	-6,466	-18.29%	35,355
Wayne	448,296	61.29%	280,772	38.39%	1,318	0.18%	1,056	0.14%	167,524	22.90%	731,442
Wexford	2,323	37.01%	3,871	61.67%	83	1.32%	0	0.00%	-1,548	-24.66%	6,277
Total	935,152	49.76%	933,998	49.70%	8,511	0.45%	1,721	0.09%	1,154	0.06%	1,879,382

===== Counties that flipped from Democratic to Republican =====
- Bay
- Kent
- Manistee
- Menominee
