= G. Mennen Williams =

American judge and politician

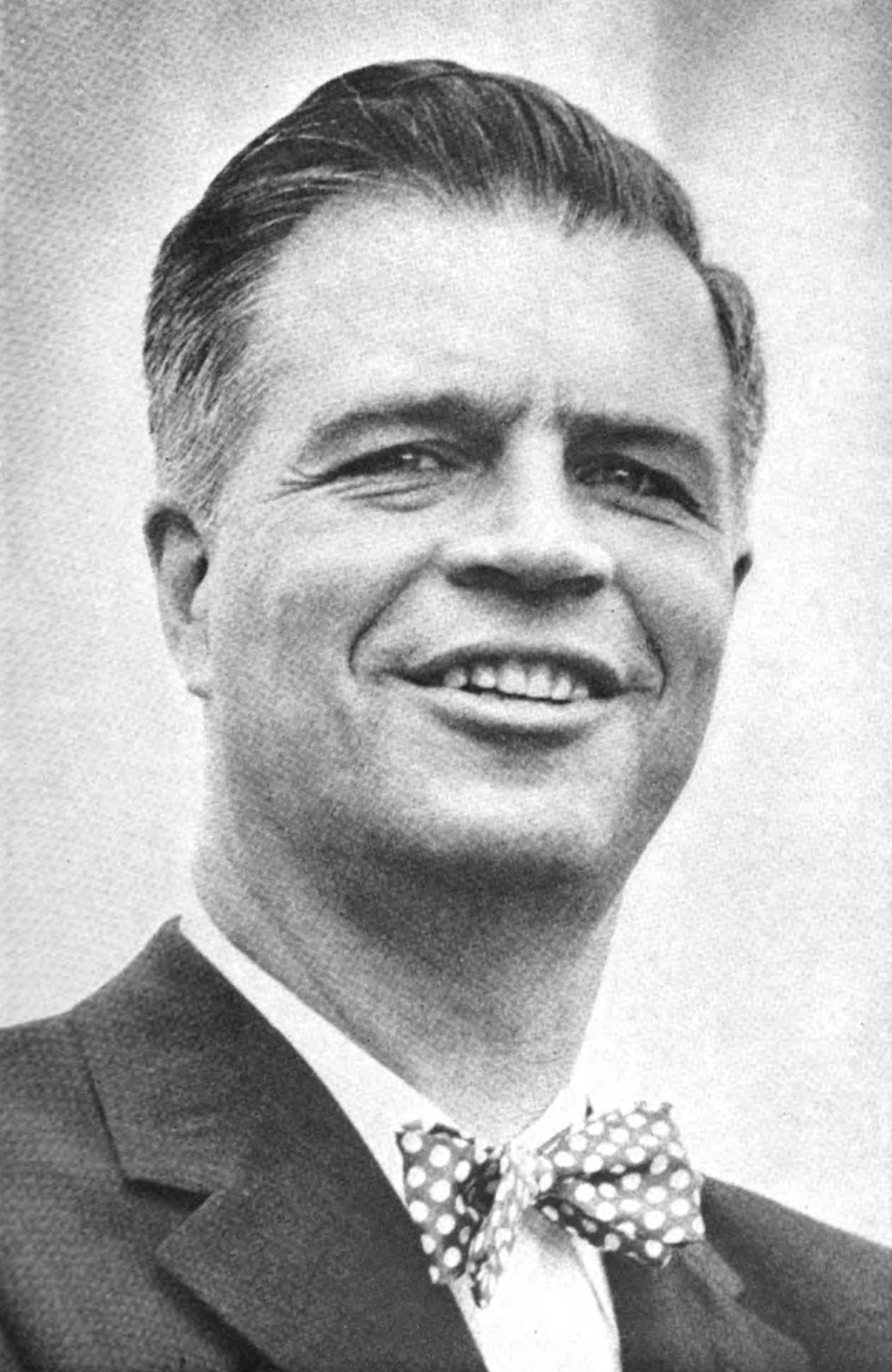

59th Chief Justice of the Michigan Supreme Court
- In office January 1, 1983 – January 1, 1987
- Preceded by: John Warner Fitzgerald
- Succeeded by: Dorothy Comstock Riley

Justice of the Michigan Supreme Court
- In office January 1, 1971 – January 1, 1987
- Preceded by: John R. Dethmers; Harry F. Kelly
- Succeeded by: Robert P. Griffin

11th United States Ambassador to the Philippines
- In office June 17, 1968 – April 7, 1969
- President: Lyndon B. Johnson; Richard Nixon
- Preceded by: William McCormick Blair Jr.
- Succeeded by: Henry A. Byroade

2nd Assistant Secretary of State for African Affairs
- In office February 1, 1961 – March 23, 1966
- President: John F. Kennedy; Lyndon B. Johnson
- Preceded by: Joseph C. Satterthwaite
- Succeeded by: Joseph Palmer II

41st Governor of Michigan
- In office January 1, 1949 – January 1, 1961
- Lieutenant: John W. Connolly; William C. Vandenberg; Clarence A. Reid; Philip A. Hart; John B. Swainson
- Preceded by: Kim C. Sigler
- Succeeded by: John B. Swainson

Personal details
- Born: Gerhard Mennen Williams; February 23, 1911 Detroit, Michigan, U.S.
- Died: February 2, 1988 (aged 76) Detroit, Michigan, U.S.
- Party: Democratic
- Spouse: Nancy Lace Quirk (m. 1937)
- Children: 3
- Education: Princeton University (AB); University of Michigan (JD)

Military service
- Allegiance: United States
- Branch/service: United States Navy
- Years of service: 1942–1946
- Rank: Lieutenant Commander
- Battles/wars: World War II

Gerhard Mennen "Soapy" Williams (February 23, 1911 – February 2, 1988) was an American politician who served as the 41st governor of Michigan, elected in 1948 and serving six two-year terms in office. He later served as Assistant Secretary of State for African Affairs under presidents John F. Kennedy and Lyndon B. Johnson and as chief justice of the Michigan Supreme Court.

Williams advocated for civil rights, racial equality, and justice for the poor. As assistant secretary of state, his remark that "what we want for the Africans is what they want for themselves", reported in the press as "Africa for the Africans", sparked controversy at the time.

A staunch liberal, Williams was described by the Chicago Tribune as a political reformer who "helped forge the alliance between Democrats, blacks and union voters in the late 1940s that began a strong liberal tradition in Michigan."

== Personal life and early career ==
Williams was born in Detroit, Michigan, to Henry P. Williams and Elma Mennen. His mother came from a prominent family; her father, Gerhard Heinrich Mennen, was the founder of the Mennen brand of men's personal care products. Because of this, Williams acquired the popular nickname "Soapy".

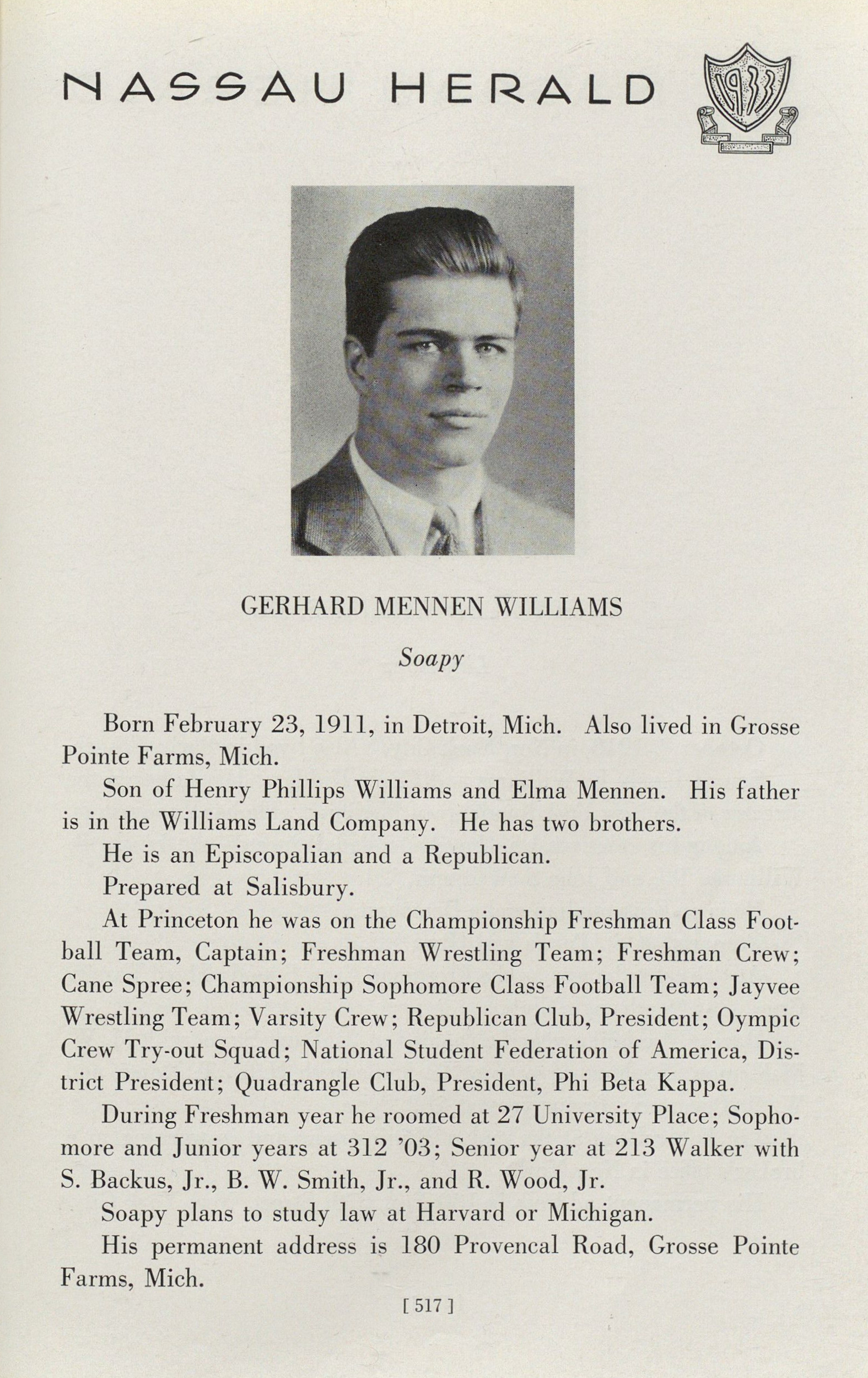
Williams in the Princeton University yearbook, 1933

Williams attended the Salisbury School in Connecticut, an exclusive Episcopal preparatory school. He graduated Phi Beta Kappa from Princeton University with an A.B. in history in 1933 after completing a senior thesis titled "Social Significance of Henry Ford". At Princeton, Williams was a member of the Quadrangle Club. He then received a Juris Doctor degree from the University of Michigan Law School. While at law school, Williams became affiliated with the Democratic Party, departing from his family's strong ties to the Republican Party.

Williams met Nancy Quirk on a blind date while attending the university. She was the daughter of D. L. Quirk and Julia (Trowbridge) Quirk, a prominent Ypsilanti family involved in banking and paper milling. Her brother, Daniel Quirk, was later mayor of Ypsilanti. The couple married in 1937 and had three children; a son, G. Mennen Williams Jr., and two daughters, Nancy Ketterer III and Wendy Stock Williams.

He worked with the law firm Griffiths, Williams and Griffiths from 1936 to 1941. Law firm partners included Hicks Griffiths and Martha Griffiths, later elected a member of Congress and lieutenant governor of Michigan.

During World War II, he served four years in the United States Navy as an air combat intelligence officer in the South Pacific. He achieved the rank of lieutenant commander and earned ten battle stars. He later served as the deputy director of the Office of Price Administration from 1946 to 1947, and was named to the Michigan Liquor Control Commission in 1947.

In 1954 he appeared as a guest on the TV series What's My Line?.

== Governor of Michigan ==
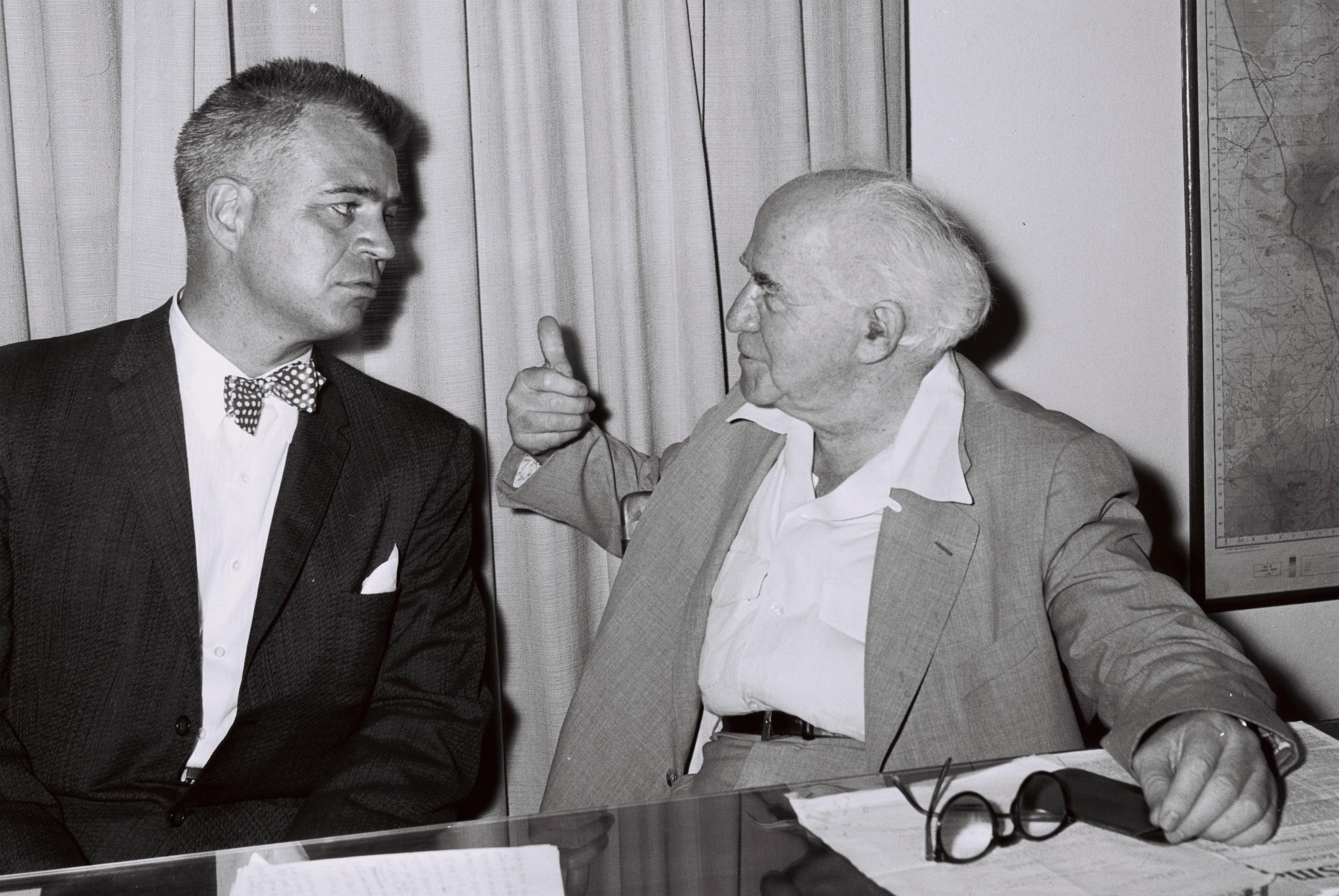
Williams with Israeli prime minister David Ben-Gurion in Tel Aviv, October 1, 1959

On November 2, 1948, Williams was elected governor of Michigan, defeating Governor Kim Sigler with the support of labor unions and dissident Republicans. He was elected to a record six two-year terms in that post. (Note: Williams holds the record for most terms, but not the longest tenure in office by years served. The term of office was increased to four years in the Constitution of 1963 for elections starting in 1966. John Engler served three four-year terms, 1991–2003, equaling Williams's 12-year tenure. Both are surpassed by William Milliken, who served from 1969 to 1983, just short of 14 years.) Among his accomplishments was the construction of the Mackinac Bridge. He appeared on the cover of Time's September 15, 1952, issue, sporting his signature green bow tie with white polka dots.

Williams believed the Michigan Department of Corrections was underfunded and outdated, and that the state's prisons were dangerously overcrowded. While visiting Marquette Branch Prison in July 1950, Williams was attacked and briefly held hostage by a group of three inmates hoping to escape. The governor had a knife held to his throat, but his attackers were soon overpowered by his bodyguard and prison employees. One of his attackers was shot dead. Williams was unharmed and mostly unshaken, choosing to continue on with his tour of the Upper Peninsula. He used the attack to his political advantage, blaming it on budget cuts made by the Republican-controlled Michigan Legislature. Later in the same year, Williams gained prominence for his refusal to extradite Haywood Patterson, one of the Scottsboro Boys, who had escaped from prison in Alabama in 1948 and hidden in Detroit for two years.

Also during Williams's 12 years in office, a farm-marketing program was sanctioned, teachers' salaries, school facilities and educational programs were improved and there were also commissions formed to research problems related to aging, sex offenders and adolescent behavior.

Williams named the first woman judge in the state's history as well as the first black judge. As a delegate to the Democratic National Convention in 1956, he unsuccessfully sought the vice-presidential nomination. At the 1952, 1956 and 1960 conventions he fought for insertion of a strong civil rights plank in the party platform. He strongly opposed the selection of Lyndon Baines Johnson as vice president in 1960, feeling that Johnson was "ideologically wrong on civil rights". Williams made public his opposition, shouting "No" when a call was made for Johnson's nomination to be made unanimous. He was the only delegate to publicly oppose Johnson's nomination.

His final term in office was marked by high-profile struggles with the Republican-controlled state legislature and a near-shutdown of the state government. He therefore chose not to seek reelection in 1960. Williams left office on January 1, 1961.

A portrait of Governor Williams, painted by John Coppin, hangs in the rotunda of the Michigan State Capitol. In the painting, Williams wears his trademark green polka dot bow tie and sits in front of the Mackinac Bridge.

== Post-gubernatorial years ==
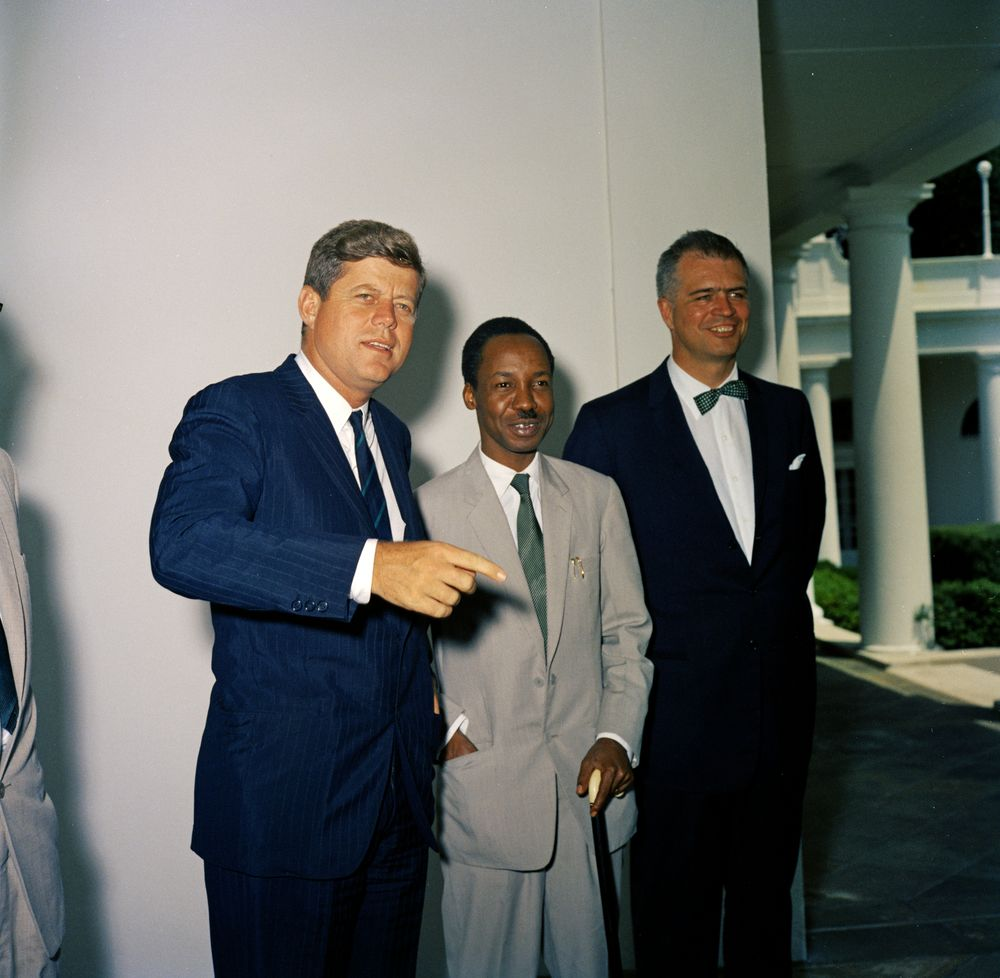
Williams with President of Tanganyika Julius Nyerere and President Kennedy in 1961

After leaving office in 1961, Williams assumed the post of Assistant Secretary of State for African Affairs in the administration of President John F. Kennedy. His remark at a press conference that "what we want for the Africans is what they want for themselves", reported in the press as "Africa for the Africans", sparked controversy. Whites in South Africa and Rhodesia, and in the British and Portuguese colonies contended that Williams wanted them expelled from the continent. Williams defended his remarks, saying that he included white Africans as Africans. Williams was defended by Kennedy at a press conference, saying that "Africa for the Africans does not seem to me to be an unreasonable statement." Kennedy said that Williams made it clear he was referring to Africans of all colors, and "I don't know who else Africa should be for."

He served in this post until early 1966, when he resigned to unsuccessfully challenge Republican US senator Robert P. Griffin. Two years later, he was named by President Lyndon B. Johnson to be U.S. ambassador to the Philippines, where he served less than a year.

In 1969 he wrote a book on the emergence of modern Africa, Africa for the Africans.

== Michigan Supreme Court ==
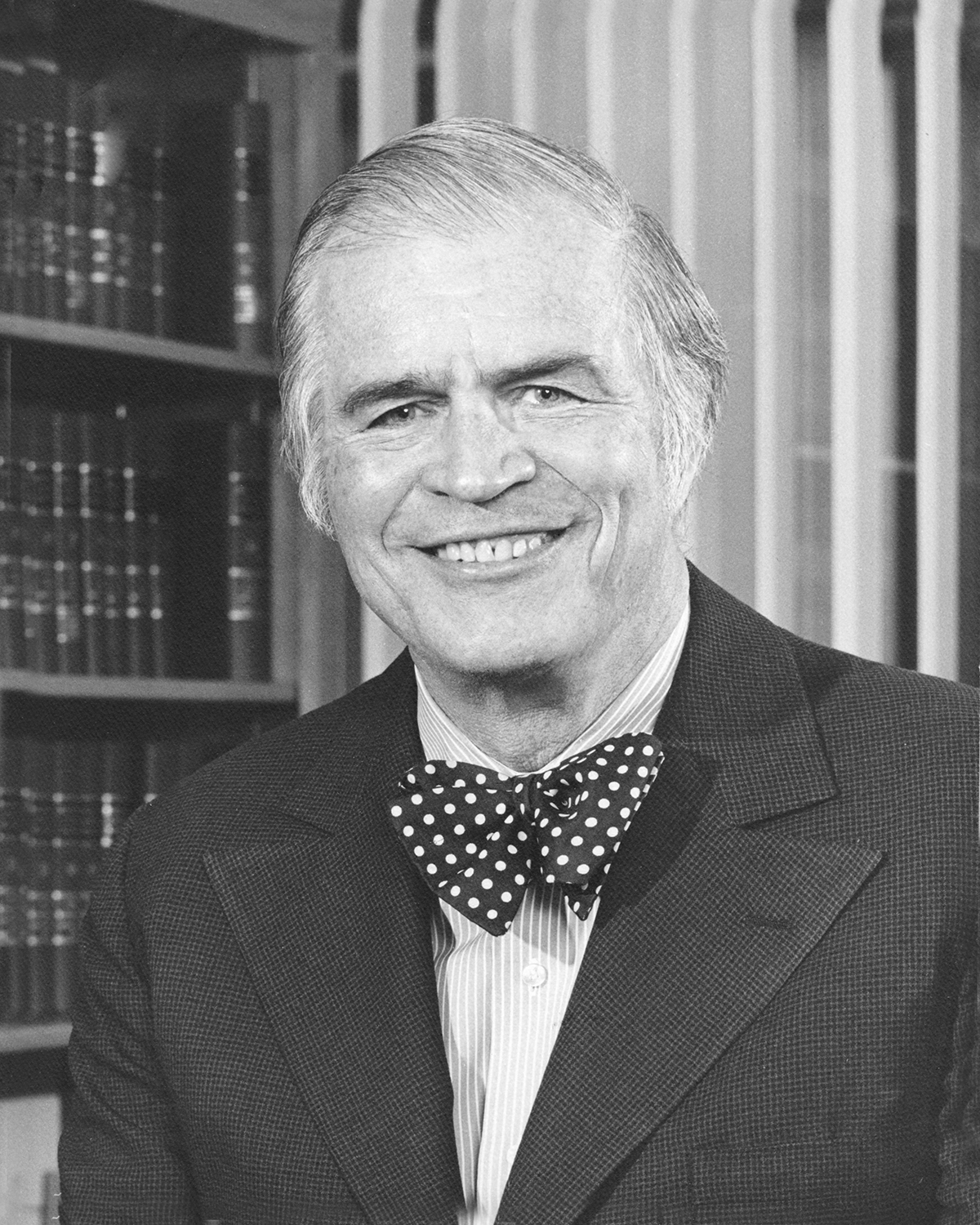
Supreme Court Justice G. Mennen Williams

Williams was elected to the Michigan Supreme Court in 1970 and was named chief justice in 1983, serving in that capacity through 1986. Thus, like William Howard Taft in the federal government, he occupied the highest executive and judicial offices in Michigan government.

== Retirement and death ==
Williams left the court on January 1, 1987, and died the following year in Detroit at the age of 76, three weeks before his 77th birthday. He was temporarily entombed at Evergreen Cemetery in Detroit and there was a formal military funeral for him. After winter his remains were interred at the Protestant Cemetery on Mackinac Island. His New York Times obituary said of Williams's diplomatic service: "Traveling widely, he studied the needs of countries in the birth pangs of independence and brought their pleas for American investment and trust to Washington."

== Honors ==
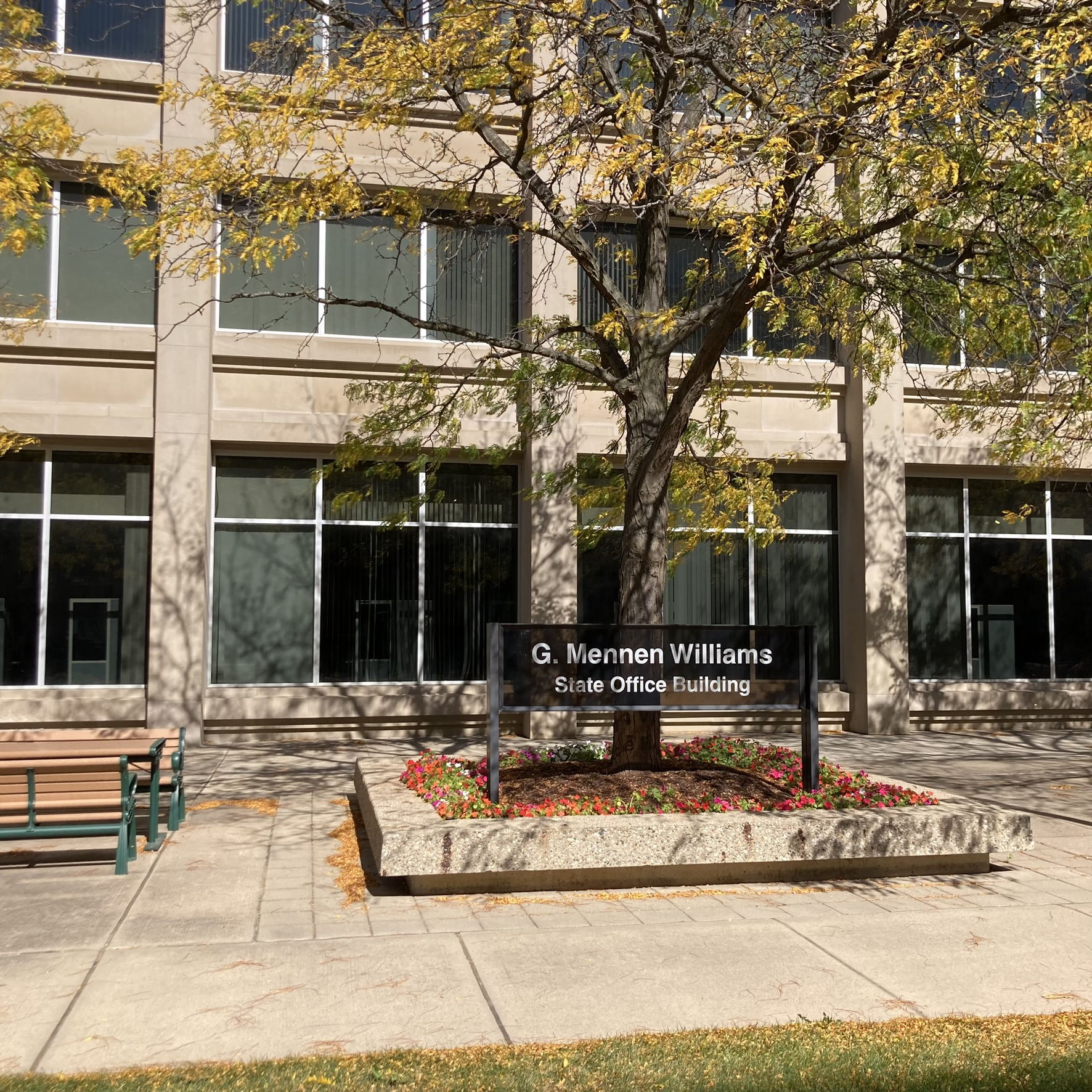
G. Mennen Williams State Office Building in Lansing, Michigan

The state government's law building, G. Mennen Williams State Office Building in Lansing, constructed in 1967, was dedicated in Williams's honor on June 1, 1997.

A G. Mennen Williams dinner is an annual event held by the Ionia County Democratic Party each July at the Ionia Free Fair. Originally called the Democratic Tent Dinner at its start in the mid-40s, it was renamed after Soapy in 1988 as a way to pay homage to the man that paved the way for dinners to be held at the fair. The Ionia Republican Party had held dinners at the fairgrounds during the 1940s, but the Democrats could not until Soapy stepped up and gained the party equal access in 1949.

A portion of Interstate 75 in Cheboygan County is known as the G. Mennen Williams Highway.

At the University of Detroit Mercy School of Law, the Moot Court Board of Advocates hosts the annual G. Mennen Williams Moot Court Competition.

== Notes ==
Party political offices
Preceded by Murray Van Wagoner	Democratic nominee for Governor of Michigan; 1948, 1950, 1952, 1954, 1956, 1958	Succeeded by John Swainson
Preceded by Patrick V. McNamara	Democratic nominee for U.S. senator from Michigan (Class 2); 1966, 1966	Succeeded by Frank J. Kelley
Political offices
Preceded by Kim Sigler	Governor of Michigan; January 1, 1949 – January 1, 1961	Succeeded by John Swainson
Government offices
Preceded by Joseph C. Satterthwaite	Assistant Secretary of State for African Affairs; February 1, 1961 – March 23, 1966	Succeeded by Joseph Palmer II
Diplomatic posts
Preceded by William McCormick Blair Jr.	United States Ambassador to the Philippines; June 17, 1968 – April 7, 1969	Succeeded by Henry A. Byroade
Legal offices
Preceded by John R. Dethmers, Harry F. Kelly	Justice of the Michigan Supreme Court; January 1, 1971 – January 1, 1987	Succeeded by Robert P. Griffin
Preceded by John Warner Fitzgerald	Chief Justice of the Michigan Supreme Court; January 1, 1983 – January 1, 1987	Succeeded by Dorothy Comstock Riley
