= T. John Lesinski =

American politician

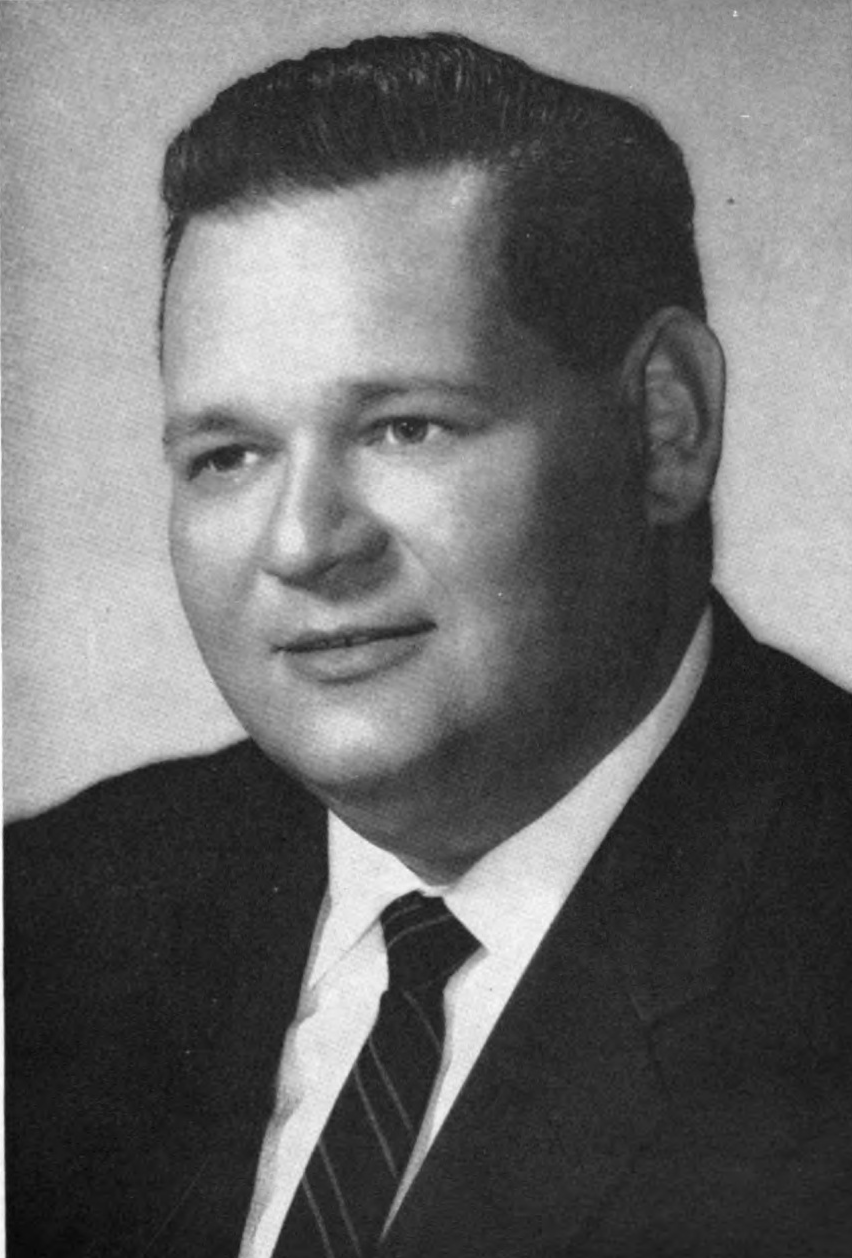

53rd Lieutenant Governor of Michigan
- In office January 1, 1961 – January 1, 1965
- Governor: John Swainson; George W. Romney
- Preceded by: John Swainson
- Succeeded by: William G. Milliken

Member of the Michigan House of Representatives from the Wayne County 7th district Wayne County 1st District (1951–1954)
- In office January 1, 1951 – December 31, 1960 Serving with E. Carey, E. Currie, F. Dingman, J. Fitzpatrick, E. Jeffries, P. Kelly, J. Kowalski, C. Lewandowski, D. Lindsay, F. Mahoney, M. Novak, S. Novak, M. O'Brien, J. O'Connor, J. Penczak, C. White, and T. Wilk (1951–1954) M. Griffiths and T. O'Brien (1951–1952) J. Beck and F. Williams (1953–1954) Michael Novak (1955–1960)
- Preceded by: E. Carey, E. Currie, F. Dingman, T. Doll, N. Edwards, J. Fitzpatrick, J. Fuller, M. Griffiths, P. Kelly, J. Kowalski, C. Lewandowski, D. Lindsay, F. Mahoney, M. Novak, S. Novak, M. O'Brien, T. O'Brien, J. O'Connor, P. O'Malley, J. Penczak, and T. Wilk
- Succeeded by: Edward K. Michalski and Michael Novak

Personal details
- Born: Thaddeus John Lesinski; April 28, 1925 Detroit, Michigan
- Died: August 13, 1996 (aged 71)
- Education: University of Detroit Law School

Thaddeus John "T. John" Lesinski, (April 28, 1925 – August 13, 1996), was an American politician and judge from the U.S. state of Michigan.

== Biography ==
Lesinski was born in Detroit, Michigan and lived in Detroit and Grosse Pointe Shores. He graduated from the University of Detroit Law School in 1950 and served as warrant officer in the Maritime Service with action in the Atlantic, Pacific and Indian theatres during World War II.

He served as a Democrat in the Michigan State House of Representatives, from Wayne County's 1st District, 1951–54, and Wayne County's 7th District, 1955-60. He was elected and served as the 53rd lieutenant governor of Michigan from 1961 to 1965. He served as Judge in the Michigan Court of Appeals 1st District from 1965 to 1976, being elected unopposed 1972 and resigned in 1976. He was a Catholic, a member of the American Bar Association, American Judicature Society, Polish National Alliance, Knights of Columbus, and Delta Theta Phi.

Lesinski was the 51st Lieutenant Governor of Michigan serving under Governors John Swainson and George W. Romney. Although George W. Romney was a Republican, Lesinski was a Democrat, and defeated Romney's running mate, former Lieutenant Governor Clarence A. Reid, since the Governor and Lieutenant Governor were at that time elected separately in Michigan. Reid himself won election as a Republican at the same time G. Mennen "Soapy" Williams, a Democrat, was elected governor.

In 1974 Judge Lesinski was the subject of Detroit Free Press articles by David Johnston (later David Cay Johnston) and Ellen Grezch exposing his lavish spending of taxpayer money. Judge Lesinski defended the spending, including buying fancier cars than the Michigan Supreme Court justices drove, saying "the dignity of the court" required top-of-the-line Oldsmobile 98s. Cartoonist Larry Wright mocked the judge as "Judge T. John Spendthrifski" in a series of political cartoons that ran from Jan. 21 to Jan. 25, 1974, in the Detroit Free Press.

He was a Partner of the law firm of Lesinski & Paruk of Detroit and later a member of the law firm of Lesinski, Krall, Murphy & O'Neil of Detroit, Troy, and St. Clair Shores.

T. John Lesinski died in 1996 at the age of 71.

Party political offices
Preceded by John Swainson	Democratic nominee for Lieutenant Governor of Michigan; 1960, 1962	Succeeded by Robert A. Derengoski
Political offices
Preceded by John Swainson	Lieutenant Governor of Michigan; 1961–1965	Succeeded by William G. Milliken
