= Rachel Bloomekatz =

American judge (born 1982)

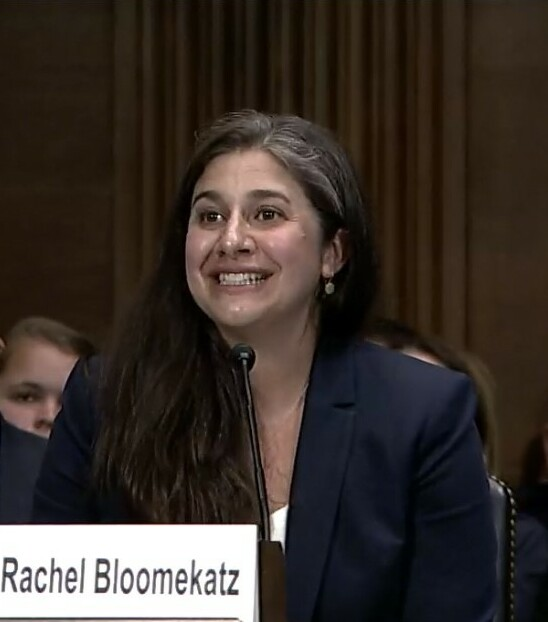

Judge of the United States Court of Appeals for the Sixth Circuit
- Incumbent
- Assumed office July 20, 2023
- Appointed by: Joe Biden
- Preceded by: R. Guy Cole Jr.

Personal details
- Born: Rachel Sarah Bloomekatz; 1982 (age 43–44) Southfield, Michigan, U.S.
- Education: Harvard University (BA); University of California, Los Angeles (JD)

Rachel Sarah Bloomekatz (born 1982) is an American lawyer from Ohio who serves as a United States circuit judge of the United States Court of Appeals for the Sixth Circuit.

== Early life and education ==
Bloomekatz was born in 1982, in Southfield, Michigan. She received her Bachelor of Arts, magna cum laude, from Harvard University in 2004 and her Juris Doctor from the UCLA School of Law in 2008. While attending UCLA, Bloomekatz was a comments editor on the UCLA Law Review. She interned with the Southern Poverty Law Center and the law firm Hadsell Stormer Rennick & Dai LLP.

== Career ==
During law school, Bloomekatz was a law clerk to Judge Algenon L. Marbley of the United States District Court for the Southern District of Ohio. After graduation from law school, she served as a law clerk for Judge Guido Calabresi of the United States Court of Appeals for the Second Circuit from 2008 to 2009. From 2009 to 2010, she served as a law clerk for Chief Justice Margaret H. Marshall of the Massachusetts Supreme Judicial Court. She served as an assistant attorney general in the Office of the Attorney General in Boston from 2010 to 2011.

From 2011 to 2012, Bloomekatz served as a law clerk for Justice Stephen Breyer of the Supreme Court of the United States. From 2013 to 2015, she was an associate at Jones Day in Columbus. From 2016 to 2019, she was a principal at Gupta Wessler PLLC. In addition, she has also represented Everytown Law, which is the legal branch of Everytown for Gun Safety and was legal director for Senator Sherrod Brown's 2012 reelection campaign. From 2019 to 2023, she was a solo practitioner at Bloomekatz Law LLC in Columbus, Ohio. Bloomekatz teaches federal courts at the Ohio State University Moritz College of Law.

=== Notable cases ===
In 2014, Bloomekatz authored an amicus brief for United States Senator Marco Rubio in the United States Court of Appeals for the Fourth Circuit to support victims of human trafficking.

Following the 2016 primary election, the Sixth Circuit appointed Bloomekatz as amica on appeal to represent the district court's order that the polling locations within the counties of Butler, Clermont, Hamilton, and Warren be extended for one hour due to Interstate I-275 being closed for hours due to a fatal accident.

Bloomekatz represented Brandon Moore in his appeals from his sentence following a conviction by a jury on three counts of aggravated robbery, three counts of rape, three counts of complicity to rape, kidnapping, aggravated menacing, and multiple firearm specifications. Moore committed these crimes when he was 15 years old. Bloomekatz prevailed before the Ohio Supreme Court in challenging his sentence as a violation of the Eighth Amendment. Later, upon appointment by the Ohio Seventh District Court of Appeals, she appealed from a Mahoning County Common Pleas Court judgment requiring him to report annually for a period of 15 years after the trial court classified him as a sexually oriented offender because, as the prosecutor agreed, the wrong law was applied.

=== Federal judicial service ===
In April 2022, Bloomekatz was one of two women being considered for nomination to the United States Court of Appeals for the Sixth Circuit, the other being former Solicitor General of Ohio Alexandra Schimmer.

On May 25, 2022, President Joe Biden nominated Bloomekatz to serve as a United States circuit judge for the United States Court of Appeals for the Sixth Circuit. President Biden nominated Bloomekatz to the seat to be vacated by Judge R. Guy Cole Jr., who announced his intent to assume senior status upon confirmation of a successor. A hearing on her nomination was held before the Senate Judiciary Committee on June 22, 2022. During her confirmation hearing, Republican senators questioned her over her support of gun control and the pro bono work that she was involved with during her tenure at Jones Day. On August 4, 2022, the committee failed to report her nomination by a 10–10–2 vote. On January 3, 2023, her nomination was returned to the President under Rule XXXI, Paragraph 6 of the United States Senate; she was renominated later the same day.

On February 9, 2023, her nomination was favorably reported by the committee by an 11–10 vote. On July 13, 2023, the Senate invoked cloture on her nomination by a 50–45 vote, with Senator Joe Manchin voting against the motion to invoke cloture on her nomination. On July 18, 2023, her nomination was confirmed by a 50–48 vote, with Senator Joe Manchin voting against her confirmation. She received her judicial commission on July 20, 2023.

== See also ==
- Joe Biden judicial appointment controversies
- List of law clerks for the second seat of the Supreme Court of the United States

Legal offices
Preceded by R. Guy Cole Jr.	Judge of the United States Court of Appeals for the Sixth Circuit; 2023–present	Incumbent
