= John Swainson =

American politician

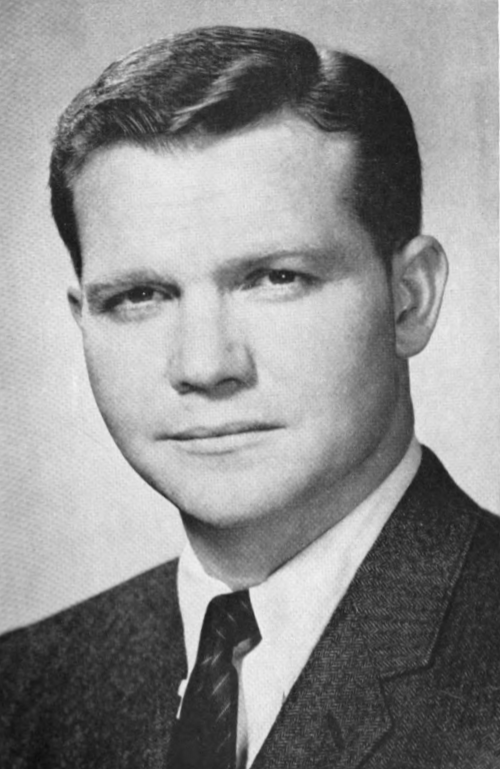

42nd Governor of Michigan
- In office January 1, 1961 – January 1, 1963
- Lieutenant: T. John Lesinski
- Preceded by: G. Mennen Williams
- Succeeded by: George W. Romney

52nd Lieutenant Governor of Michigan
- In office January 1, 1959 – January 1, 1961
- Governor: G. Mennen Williams
- Preceded by: Philip Hart
- Succeeded by: T. John Lesinski

Justice of the Michigan Supreme Court
- In office January 1, 1971 – November 7, 1975
- Preceded by: John R. Dethmers; Harry F. Kelly
- Succeeded by: James L. Ryan

Member of the Michigan Senate from the 18th district
- In office January 1, 1955 – January 1, 1959
- Preceded by: Allen H. Blondy
- Succeeded by: Raymond D. Dzendzel

Personal details
- Born: July 31, 1925 Windsor, Ontario, Canada
- Died: May 13, 1994 (aged 68) Manchester, Michigan, U.S.
- Resting place: Oak Grove Cemetery; Manchester, Michigan
- Party: Democratic
- Spouse: Alice Nielsen
- Education: Olivet College (BA); University of North Carolina at Chapel Hill (JD)

Military service
- Allegiance: United States
- Branch/service: United States Army
- Unit: C Company, 378th Infantry Regiment, 95th Infantry Division
- Battles/wars: World War II
- Awards: Croix de Guerre; Presidential Unit Citation; Purple Heart

John Burley Swainson (July 31, 1925 – May 13, 1994) was a Canadian-American politician and jurist who served as the 42nd governor of Michigan from 1961 to 1963.

== Early life and education ==
Swainson was born in Windsor, Ontario, Canada. He moved to Port Huron, Michigan, at the age of two, with his family.

His father, John A. C. Swainson, of Port Huron, was a Democratic presidential elector for Michigan in 1964 and an alternate Michigan delegate to the 1972 Democratic National Convention.

He was captain of his high school football team and an Eagle Scout.

Swainson served in the United States Army during World War II with C Company, 378th Infantry Regiment of the 95th Infantry Division and lost both legs by amputation following a landmine explosion November 15, 1944, near Metz, Alsace-Lorraine. He was awarded France's Croix de Guerre, the Presidential Unit Citation with two battle stars, and the Purple Heart, all before his twentieth birthday. After months of convalescence and rehabilitation at the Percy Jones Army Hospital in Battle Creek, Swainson learned to walk upright and unassisted.

Swainson received a B.A. from Olivet College, where he also met and married his wife, Alice Nielson. She accompanied him to the University of North Carolina at Chapel Hill, where he received a J.D. degree in 1951. While there, he was elected student president of the law school.

== Political career ==
Swainson was elected to the Michigan State Senate from the 18th District in 1954 and was reelected in 1956. In 1958, when Philip Hart was elected to the United States Senate, Swainson succeeded Hart as the lieutenant governor of Michigan under Governor G. Mennen Williams. When the long-serving and popular Williams announced he would not seek re-election in 1960, Swainson decided to enter the race. He did so despite being pressured by influential Democratic Party members, including Williams, not to run in deference to three-term Michigan Secretary of State, James M. Hare. Swainson won the primary against the party favorite, largely due to strong support from labor unions.

On November 8, 1960, Swainson narrowly (1.28% margin) defeated Republican Paul D. Bagwell, a Michigan State University professor, in the 1960 Michigan gubernatorial election. As a result, the 35-year-old Swainson became the youngest governor of Michigan in the 20th century. (Note: The "Boy Governor", Stevens T. Mason, elected at 24 in 1835, was younger.) He was also the state's second foreign-born governor. (Note: Fred M. Warner, who served as Michigan's 26th Governor from 1905 to 1911, was born in Hickling, Nottinghamshire, England. George W. Romney, who succeeded Swainson, was the third and was born to US citizens residing in Mexico and was thus a US citizen from birth but was born out of the US. Jennifer Granholm was the fourth and was also born in Canada.)

Swainson's lieutenant governor was T. John Lesinski. His opponent in the Democratic primary, Hare, continued to serve as Michigan Secretary of State until 1971.

During his two years in office, a tax was secured on the usage of telegraphs, telephones, and leased wires; court procedures and medical care for the elderly were improved, legislative pensions were excluded from both local and state taxes; and taxes on liquor, beer, and cigarettes were raised to fund educational programs.

When the Bluewater International Bridge (which spans the St. Clair River between Port Huron, Michigan, and Sarnia, Ontario) was paid off, Swainson used an executive order to cancel the $0.25 toll that had been collected. "Stoically", he effectively cancelled his own father's "$6,115-a-year toll-collector's job," which John A. C. Swainson held since 1957.

He appointed the first African American to sit on the Michigan Supreme Court.

In 1962, Swainson was defeated by Republican George W. Romney, the chairman of the American Motors Corporation, who had never before held elected office. The win was attributed in part to Romney's appeal to independent voters, as well as to the increasing influence of suburban Detroit voters, who, by 1962, were more likely to vote Republican than the heavily Democratic city. (It also marks the only time in US history that a governor born in Canada was replaced by one born in Mexico.)

== Later years ==
On June 23, 1963, Swainson accompanied the Reverend Martin Luther King Jr., Detroit mayor Jerome Cavanagh, and approximately 125,000 people on a "Walk for Freedom" march down Detroit's Woodward Avenue. The same year, he was also a member of Democratic National Committee from Michigan.

He served as Michigan Circuit Court judge of the 3rd Circuit from 1965 to 1971 and as a justice of the Michigan Supreme Court from 1971 to 1975. In 1975, he was accused of accepting a $20,000 bribe from a felon, who was seeking review by the Supreme Court. He was found not guilty but was convicted of perjury over his testimony to the grand jury. As a result, he resigned from the Supreme Court, was sentenced to 60 days in a minimum-security facility, and lost his license to practice law for three years.

The criminal charges derailed his expected run to replace retiring senator Phil Hart. There are pundits who maintain that he was the "victim of an overzealous prosecutor."

He later became an antiques dealer and became president of the Michigan Historical Commission. In the later years, he often represented the state at the Detroit Highland Games and apologized for not wearing a kilt: "I don't have the legs for it."

His life's journey was described as being an inspirational story of personal redemption: "By 1985, his reputation was restored when he was appointed president of the Michigan Historical Commission. (Michigan Supreme Court. Michigan Reports: Cases Decided by the Supreme Court of Michigan. Rochester, N.Y.: Lawyers Co-operative Publishing Co., 1949 - 1998, Vol. 419.)"

== Death and legacy ==
At the age of 68, Swainson died of a heart attack in Manchester, Michigan, and he is interred there at Oak Grove Cemetery. His wife, Alice, died on September 5, 2004, in Manchester at 77.

During his life, he was a member of American Legion, AMVETS, Disabled American Veterans, Veterans of Foreign Wars, Elks, Lions International, Delta Theta Phi, and Boy Scouts of America. In the Boy Scouts, Swainson was an active leader of the local Order of the Arrow lodge and served as secretary.

The Michigan Historical Commission established the Governor John B. Swainson Award in 1996 to honor him for his love of history and as one of the few public officials to have served in the legislative, executive, and judicial branches of state government. The commission presents the award to state, county, or municipal employees who have contributed to the preservation of Michigan history even if such activities are not part of their primary job responsibility. Swainson's last public office was president of the Michigan Historical Commission as an appointee of Governor James Blanchard.

His papers are 75.1 ft, collected at the Bentley Historical Library at the University of Michigan. Particularly represented are documents regarding research, public policy, and programs concerning poliomyelitis and the Salk vaccine.

Swainson was honored by an official portrait painted by Dorthea R. Stockbridge. The portrait was dedicated at a Special Session of the Michigan Supreme Court's Special Session. The portrait hangs on the fourth floor of the Michigan Hall of Justice.

Hanging in the Michigan State Capitol on the second floor 'Hall of Governors' is "his gubernatorial portrait [that] is notable for appearing unfinished." It is said to be one of the most unusual portraits, a portent that Swainson's political career was not yet finished. The Republican legislature even authorized the painting of a more traditional replacement, which has not yet been accomplished.

At the dedication of his judicial portrait, Swainson said he left the final judgement of his public career to history.

== See also ==
- List of United States governors born outside the United States

== Sources ==
- Glazer, Lawrence (October 2010). Wounded Warrior: The Rise and Fall of Michigan Governor John Swainson (First ed.). East Lansing, Michigan: Michigan State University Press. ISBN 978-0-87013-971-0. Named a 2010 "Michigan Notable Book" by the Library of Michigan.
- Langeveld, Martin; Langeveld, Dirk (November 29, 2008). "John Swainson: post-gubernatorial perjury". The Downfall Dictionary.
- Sobel, Robert; Raimo, John, eds. (1978). Biographical Directory of Governors of the United States, 1789-1978, 4 vols. Vol. 2. Westport, Connecticut: Meckler Books. ISBN 0-930466-00-4.

Party political offices
Preceded by Philip Hart	Democratic nominee for Lieutenant Governor of Michigan; 1958	Succeeded by T. John Lesinski
Preceded by G. Mennen Williams	Democratic nominee for Governor of Michigan; 1960, 1962	Succeeded by Neil Staebler
Political offices
Preceded by Philip A. Hart	Lieutenant Governor of Michigan; January 1, 1959 – January 1, 1961	Succeeded by T. John Lesinski
Preceded by G. Mennen Williams	Governor of Michigan; January 1, 1961 – January 1, 1963	Succeeded by George W. Romney
Legal offices
Preceded by John R. Dethmers, Harry F. Kelly	Justice of the Michigan Supreme Court; January 1, 1971 – November 7, 1975	Succeeded by James L. Ryan
