= Feeder judge =

Judge whose clerks often get US Supreme Court clerkships

In the United States, feeder judges are prominent judges in the American federal judiciary whose law clerks are frequently selected to become law clerks for the justices of the U.S. Supreme Court. Feeder judges are able to place comparatively many of their clerks on the Supreme Court for a variety of reasons, including personal or ideological relationships with particular justices, prestigious and respected positions in the judiciary, and reputations for attracting and training high-quality clerks. Supreme Court clerkships are highly prized and the most difficult to secure in the American clerking landscape—they have been called the "brass ring of law clerk fame" and the "ultimate achievement." Feeder clerkships are, consequently, similarly prized as stepping stones to a potential clerkship with the Supreme Court.

== History ==
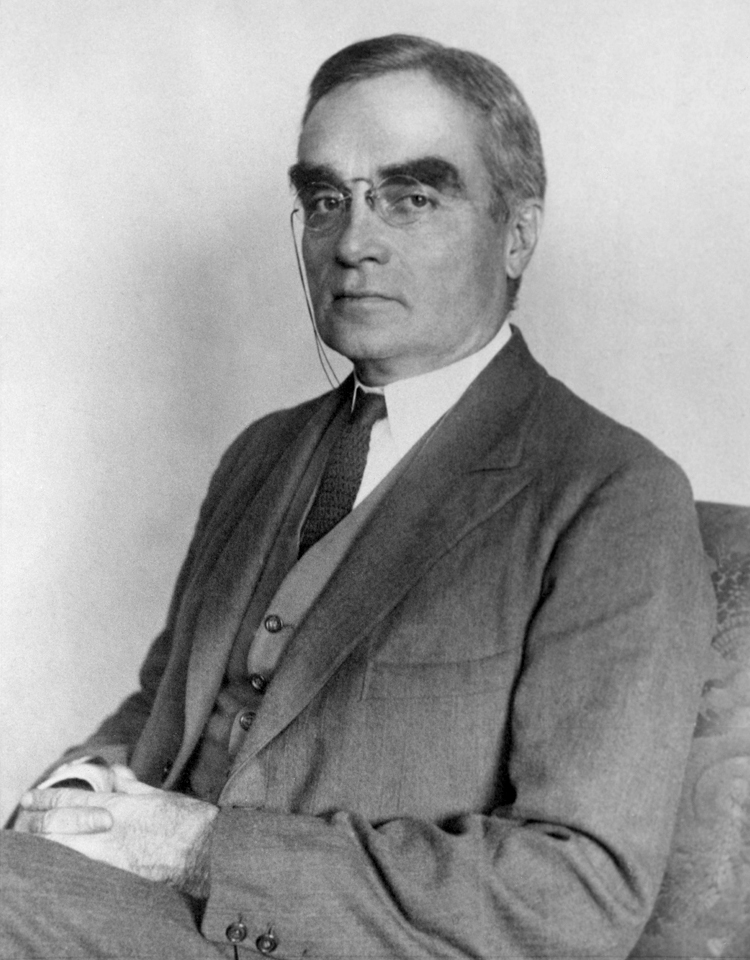
Judge Learned Hand was one of the earliest feeder judges in the United States.

Justices in the early history of the United States Supreme Court hired law clerks straight from law school based on personal recommendations. But over time, applicants to Supreme Court clerk posts began to more often have prior experience, and between 1962 and 2002, 98 percent of Supreme Court clerks had clerked before. As the court began to draw more frequently from prior clerks, particular lower-court judges naturally had more consistent success placing their clerks with the Supreme Court. This phenomenon probably began with Judge Learned Hand, and had been established by the time of Chief Justice Warren Burger in 1969, although data before his tenure is unreliable. Although the phenomenon had thus existed for quite some time, the first published uses of the phrase were in a 1990 article by Judge Patricia Wald and a 1991 article by Judge Alex Kozinski, both feeder judges themselves.

Statistical analysis comparing the feeders of the 1976-1985 and 1995-2004 terms suggests the reliance on feeders has remained consistent since the Burger era, or at most has seen modest growth. However, the feeder system has become more concentrated as more judges are feeding to specific justices than in the past.

== Judges ==
During the 1969 to 1986 tenure of Chief Justice Warren E. Burger, 85 percent of Supreme Court clerks had previously served on a court of appeals and 12 percent on a district court. For the 1986–2005 William Rehnquist court, these numbers had respectively risen to 92 percent and dropped to 7 percent. Although most feeder judges are therefore court of appeals judges, some district court judges are feeders. Judges Louis H. Pollak and Pierre N. Leval were historically feeders while on the district court, and district Judge Jed S. Rakoff is essentially a feeder since he co-hires clerks with appellate feeder Judge Robert Katzmann.

Various factors affect which judges become feeders. Ideological alignment with justices is usually an important factor, and conservative feeder judges place more clerks with conservative justices and vice versa. In fact, feeder judges are notorious for being on the extremes of the judicial spectrum, with comparatively few ideologically moderate feeder judges.

For some, the reputation as a feeder judge is a draw. "It's a little bit of a prestige matter," Kozinski has remarked. Being regarded as a feeder can be a way to stand out among the ranks of courts of appeals judges. Indeed, many feeder judges cherish this status so much they modulate their own clerkship hiring based on an applicant's compatibility with the justices, and pass over promising clerks because they are doubtful of the applicant's chances of securing a Supreme Court clerkship. Additionally, because feeder clerkships are themselves so highly desired, the judges benefit by being able to hire some the most talented of the clerkship applicant pool in a given year.

Some judges have an edge placing clerks with justices for whom they themselves were once clerks. Judge Michael Luttig, for example, clerked for Justice Antonin Scalia while Scalia was on the D.C. Circuit, and Luttig placed three-quarters of his clerks with Scalia or Justice Clarence Thomas. Kozinski clerked for Justice Anthony Kennedy, and of the 15 clerks he placed on the court between 1995 and 2004, eight were with Kennedy. Beyond connections to particular justices, the D.C. Circuit is regarded a feeder circuit to the entire court, due partially to the simple fact that justices live, work and socialize with those judges in Washington, D.C. as well as being a prestigious circuit in its own right.

== Feeder judges ==
Modern feeder judges (OT 2009–present)
Judge	Court	No. of clerks
Raymond Kethledge	Sixth Circuit	17
J. Harvie Wilkinson III	Fourth Circuit	14
Diarmuid O'Scannlain	Ninth Circuit	11
William H. Pryor Jr.	Eleventh Circuit	11
Jeffrey Sutton	Sixth Circuit	10
Alex Kozinski	Ninth Circuit	10
David S. Tatel	D.C. Circuit	8
Thomas B. Griffith	D.C. Circuit	7
Douglas H. Ginsburg	D.C. Circuit	6
Guido Calabresi	Second Circuit	6
William A. Fletcher	Ninth Circuit	6
Richard Posner	Seventh Circuit	5
Janice Rogers Brown	D.C. Circuit	5
Anthony J. Scirica	Third Circuit	5

Feeder judges from OT 2009 through OT 2013
Judge	Court	No. of clerks	No. per year of service	Notes as of 2023
Brett Kavanaugh	D.C. Circuit	16	3.2	Appointed to the Supreme Court by Donald Trump in 2018
J. Harvie Wilkinson III	Fourth Circuit	16	3.2	
Merrick B. Garland	D.C. Circuit	16	3.2	Was nominated unsuccessfully to the Supreme Court by Barack Obama but the Republican Senate refused to consider it. Appointed United States Attorney General in 2021.
Jeffrey Sutton	Sixth Circuit	10	2	
Alex Kozinski	Ninth Circuit	9	1.8	Resigned from the Ninth Circuit in December 2017 due to allegations of sexual misconduct by fifteen women.
Robert Katzmann	Second Circuit	9	1.8	Assumed senior status on January 21, 2021, and died on June 9, 2021
David S. Tatel	D.C. Circuit	8	1.6	Assumed senior status on May 16, 2022
Diarmuid O'Scannlain	Ninth Circuit	7	1.4	Assumed senior status on December 31, 2016
Thomas B. Griffith	D.C. Circuit	7	1.4	Retired on September 1, 2020.
Douglas H. Ginsburg	D.C. Circuit	6	1.2	Assumed senior status on October 14, 2011
Neil Gorsuch	Tenth Circuit	6	1.2	Appointed to the Supreme Court by Donald Trump in 2017
Stephen Reinhardt	Ninth Circuit	6	1.2	Died on March 29, 2018
William A. Fletcher	Ninth Circuit	6	1.2	Assumed senior status on January 24, 2022

Feeder judges from 1962–2002
Judge	Court	No. of clerks	No. per year of service	Notes as of 2015
J. Skelly Wright	D.C. Circuit	31	1.15	Retired in 1981
J. Michael Luttig	Fourth Circuit	30	2.73	Retired in 2006.
Laurence Silberman	D.C. Circuit	30	1.76	Assumed senior status November 1, 2000.
Harry T. Edwards	D.C. Circuit	28	1.27	Assumed senior status on November 3, 2005
Alex Kozinski	Ninth Circuit	27	1.59	Resigned from the Ninth Circuit in December 2017 due to allegations of sexual misconduct by fifteen women.
James L. Oakes	Second Circuit	26	0.84	Died in 2007
Abner Mikva	D.C. Circuit	24	1.5	Retired in 1994
Stephen F. Williams	D.C. Circuit	21	1.31	Assumed senior status in September 2001
J. Harvie Wilkinson III	Fourth Circuit	20	1.11	Active feeder judge
Patricia Wald	D.C. Circuit	19	0.90	Retired in 1999
Guido Calabresi	Second Circuit	17	2.13	Assumed senior status July 21, 2009.
William Albert Norris	Ninth Circuit	16	0.89	Retired in 1997
Ruth Bader Ginsburg	D.C. Circuit	15	1.07	Appointed to the Supreme Court by Bill Clinton in 1993
Carl McGowan	D.C. Circuit	15	0.60	Died in 1987
David S. Tatel	D.C. Circuit	14	1.75	Active feeder judge
Richard Posner	Seventh Circuit	14	0.67	Retired in 2017
Louis H. Pollak	Eastern District of Pennsylvania	14	0.58	Retired in 1991
Pierre N. Leval	Second Circuit	14	0.56	Assumed senior status in 2002
Michael Boudin	First Circuit	13	1.3	Assumed senior status on June 1, 2013
Malcolm Richard Wilkey	D.C. Circuit	13	0.81	Retired in 1985
Douglas H. Ginsburg	D.C. Circuit	13	0.81	Assumed senior status on October 14, 2011
Stephen Breyer	First Circuit	12	0.80	Appointed to the Supreme Court by Bill Clinton in 1994.
Robert Bork	D.C. Circuit	9	1.29	Retired in 1988
David B. Sentelle	D.C. Circuit	9	0.60	Assumed senior status on February 12, 2013

== See also ==
- Lists of law clerks of the Supreme Court of the United States
