= 1960 Michigan gubernatorial election =

- November 8, 1960
- Turnout: 41.62%
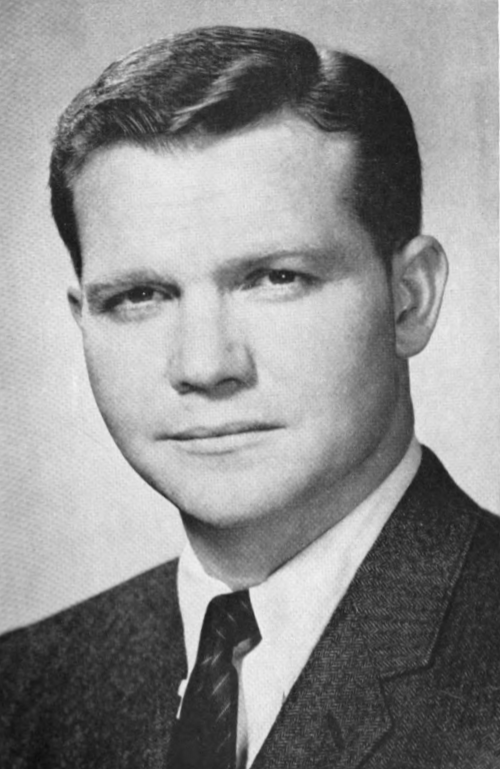

Nominee	John B. Swainson	Paul D. Bagwell
Party	Democratic	Republican
Popular vote	1,643,634	1,602,022
Percentage	50.48%	49.20%
- County results Swainson: 50–60% 60–70% Bagwell: 50–60% 60–70% 70–80%
Governor before election
G. Mennen Williams
Democratic
Elected Governor
John B. Swainson
Democratic

The 1960 Michigan gubernatorial election was held on November 8, 1960. Democratic nominee John B. Swainson narrowly defeated Republican nominee Paul D. Bagwell with 50.48% of the vote.

This was the last time until 2026 that the elected Governor of Michigan was a member of the same party as the outgoing Governor, or that Democrats won the Michigan governor's office in more than two consecutive elections. In this case, both Swainson and outgoing Governor G. Mennen “Soapy” Williams were Democrats.

== Primary election ==
Michigan held primary elections on August 2, 1960.

=== Democratic party ===
After incumbent governor G. Mennen Williams declined to seek a seventh term, lieutenant governor John B. Swainson defeated secretary of state James M. Hare in the primary to secure the Democratic nomination.

==== Candidates ====
- Edward Connor, member of Detroit City Council
- James M. Hare, Michigan Secretary of State
- John B. Swainson, Lieutenant Governor of Michigan

==== Results ====
Democratic primary results
Party	Candidate	Votes	%
Democratic	John B. Swainson	274,743	50.81%
Democratic	James M. Hare	205,086	37.93%
Democratic	Edward Connor	60,895	11.26%
Democratic	Scattering	19	0.00%
Total votes		540,743	100.00%

=== Republican party ===
Paul D. Bagwell won the Republican nomination unopposed for the second consecutive election.

==== Candidates ====
- Paul D. Bagwell, Republican nominee for governor in 1958

==== Results ====
Republican primary results
Party	Candidate	Votes	%
Republican	Paul D. Bagwell	480,361	99.98%
Republican	Scattering	113	0.02%
Total votes		480,474	100.00%

== General election ==
=== Candidates ===
Major party candidates

- John B. Swainson, Democratic
- Paul D. Bagwell, Republican

Other candidates

- Robert Himmel Jr., Socialist Workers
- Delmar D. Gibbons, Prohibition
- F. J. Toohey, Tax Cut
- Theos A. Grove, Socialist labor
- R. Roy Pursell, Independent American

=== Results ===
1960 Michigan gubernatorial election
Party	Candidate	Votes	%	±%
Democratic	John B. Swainson	1,643,634	50.48%	−2.52%
Republican	Paul D. Bagwell	1,602,022	49.20%	+2.58%
Socialist Workers	Robert Himmel Jr.	3,387	0.10%	+0.06%
Prohibition	Delmar D. Gibbons	2,183	0.07%	−0.09%
Tax Cut	F. J. Toohey	1,899	0.06%	
Socialist Labor	Theos A. Grove	1,479	0.05%	−0.13%
Independent American	R. Roy Pursell	1,354	0.04%	
	Scattering	33	0.00%	
Majority		41,612	1.28%	
Total votes		3,255,991	100.00%	
Democratic hold		Swing	-5.10%	

==== Results by county ====
Swainson was the first Democrat since Robert McClelland in 1851 to be elected governor without carrying Genesee County.

County	John B. Swainson Democratic		Paul D. Bagwell Republican		All Others Various		Margin		Total votes cast
County	#	%	#	%	#	%	#	%	Total votes cast
Alcona	998	33.18%	2,001	66.52%	9	0.30%	-1,003	-33.34%	3,008
Alger	2,302	59.62%	1,547	40.07%	12	0.31%	755	19.55%	3,861
Allegan	6,818	30.08%	15,778	69.61%	70	0.31%	-8,960	-39.53%	22,666
Alpena	4,746	41.86%	6,582	58.05%	10	0.09%	-1,836	-16.19%	11,338
Antrim	1,621	33.89%	3,153	65.92%	9	0.19%	-1,532	-32.03%	4,783
Arenac	1,794	43.33%	2,335	56.40%	11	0.27%	-541	-13.07%	4,140
Baraga	1,988	53.01%	1,753	46.75%	9	0.24%	235	6.27%	3,750
Barry	4,451	33.14%	8,906	66.30%	75	0.56%	-4,455	-33.17%	13,432
Bay	22,632	52.14%	20,649	47.57%	125	0.29%	1,983	4.57%	43,406
Benzie	1,296	35.13%	2,382	64.57%	11	0.30%	-1,086	-29.44%	3,689
Berrien	23,598	39.64%	35,721	60.01%	208	0.35%	-12,123	-20.37%	59,527
Branch	4,759	36.06%	8,364	63.38%	74	0.56%	-3,605	-27.32%	13,197
Calhoun	23,283	42.41%	31,392	57.18%	227	0.41%	-8,109	-14.77%	54,902
Cass	6,495	44.12%	8,152	55.38%	73	0.50%	-1,657	-11.26%	14,720
Charlevoix	2,439	39.40%	3,740	60.41%	12	0.19%	-1,301	-21.01%	6,191
Cheboygan	2,763	42.07%	3,800	57.86%	5	0.08%	-1,037	-15.79%	6,568
Chippewa	5,166	45.40%	6,199	54.48%	14	0.12%	-1,033	-9.08%	11,379
Clare	1,450	29.16%	3,512	70.64%	10	0.20%	-2,062	-41.47%	4,972
Clinton	5,056	34.10%	9,749	65.75%	23	0.16%	-4,693	-31.65%	14,828
Crawford	791	36.35%	1,382	63.51%	3	0.14%	-591	-27.16%	2,176
Delta	7,747	55.73%	6,124	44.06%	29	0.21%	1,623	11.68%	13,900
Dickinson	6,353	55.26%	5,128	44.60%	16	0.14%	1,225	10.65%	11,497
Eaton	7,531	36.43%	13,061	63.18%	80	0.39%	-5,530	-26.75%	20,672
Emmet	2,532	37.39%	4,220	62.32%	20	0.30%	-1,688	-24.93%	6,772
Genesee	71,912	49.61%	72,565	50.06%	482	0.33%	-653	-0.45%	144,959
Gladwin	1,448	31.15%	3,193	68.70%	7	0.15%	-1,745	-37.54%	4,648
Gogebic	7,278	58.99%	5,029	40.76%	30	0.24%	2,249	18.23%	12,337
Grand Traverse	4,930	37.61%	8,144	62.13%	35	0.27%	-3,214	-24.52%	13,109
Gratiot	3,845	29.03%	9,373	70.76%	29	0.22%	-5,528	-41.73%	13,247
Hillsdale	4,151	30.14%	9,542	69.29%	78	0.57%	-5,391	-39.15%	13,771
Houghton	7,951	52.07%	7,295	47.77%	25	0.16%	656	4.30%	15,271
Huron	5,364	35.68%	9,657	64.23%	13	0.09%	-4,293	-28.56%	15,034
Ingham	34,267	39.92%	51,392	59.86%	190	0.22%	-17,125	-19.95%	85,849
Ionia	6,553	40.06%	9,742	59.55%	64	0.39%	-3,189	-19.49%	16,359
Iosco	2,437	36.59%	4,219	63.35%	4	0.06%	-1,782	-26.76%	6,660
Iron	5,079	57.06%	3,804	42.74%	18	0.20%	1,275	14.32%	8,901
Isabella	4,128	35.81%	7,380	64.02%	20	0.17%	-3,252	-28.21%	11,528
Jackson	21,266	38.78%	33,431	60.96%	143	0.26%	-12,165	-22.18%	54,840
Kalamazoo	23,806	36.01%	41,887	63.36%	419	0.63%	-18,081	-27.35%	66,112
Kalkaska	754	37.61%	1,247	62.19%	4	0.20%	-493	-24.59%	2,005
Kent	60,009	38.71%	94,516	60.97%	493	0.32%	-34,507	-22.26%	155,018
Keweenaw	659	51.36%	620	48.32%	4	0.31%	39	3.04%	1,283
Lake	1,213	47.42%	1,343	52.50%	2	0.08%	-130	-5.08%	2,558
Lapeer	5,223	33.91%	10,162	65.97%	19	0.12%	-4,939	-32.06%	15,404
Leelanau	1,738	39.43%	2,662	60.39%	8	0.18%	-924	-20.96%	4,408
Lenawee	10,811	35.72%	19,377	64.02%	78	0.26%	-8,566	-28.30%	30,266
Livingston	5,618	35.81%	10,025	63.90%	46	0.29%	-4,407	-28.09%	15,689
Luce	863	37.59%	1,430	62.28%	3	0.13%	-567	-24.70%	2,296
Mackinac	1,954	39.71%	2,956	60.07%	11	0.22%	-1,002	-20.36%	4,921
Macomb	101,497	61.41%	63,254	38.27%	526	0.32%	38,243	23.14%	165,277
Manistee	3,901	44.68%	4,819	55.20%	10	0.11%	-918	-10.52%	8,730
Marquette	11,607	54.48%	9,651	45.30%	48	0.23%	1,956	9.18%	21,306
Mason	4,286	43.05%	5,656	56.82%	13	0.13%	-1,370	-13.76%	9,955
Mecosta	2,311	31.52%	4,997	68.15%	24	0.33%	-2,686	-36.63%	7,332
Menominee	5,517	52.16%	5,051	47.75%	10	0.09%	466	4.41%	10,578
Midland	6,860	33.45%	13,609	66.35%	41	0.20%	-6,749	-32.91%	20,510
Missaukee	657	21.38%	2,405	78.26%	11	0.36%	-1,748	-56.88%	3,073
Monroe	19,733	52.40%	17,787	47.23%	138	0.37%	1,946	5.17%	37,658
Montcalm	4,786	33.34%	9,540	66.47%	27	0.19%	-4,754	-33.12%	14,353
Montmorency	853	36.38%	1,490	63.54%	2	0.09%	-637	-27.16%	2,345
Muskegon	29,165	47.89%	31,543	51.80%	191	0.31%	-2,378	-3.90%	60,899
Newaygo	3,368	32.93%	6,849	66.96%	11	0.11%	-3,481	-34.03%	10,228
Oakland	130,087	44.01%	164,559	55.67%	960	0.32%	-34,472	-11.66%	295,606
Oceana	2,610	37.86%	4,269	61.93%	14	0.20%	-1,659	-24.07%	6,893
Ogemaw	1,821	41.02%	2,610	58.80%	8	0.18%	-789	-17.77%	4,439
Ontonagon	2,576	51.44%	2,429	48.50%	3	0.06%	147	2.94%	5,008
Osceola	1,356	24.24%	4,218	75.42%	19	0.34%	-2,862	-51.17%	5,593
Oscoda	472	29.32%	1,136	70.56%	2	0.12%	-664	-41.24%	1,610
Otsego	1,469	43.85%	1,878	56.06%	3	0.09%	-409	-12.21%	3,350
Ottawa	11,420	26.62%	31,366	73.11%	115	0.27%	-19,946	-46.49%	42,901
Presque Isle	2,557	46.72%	2,911	53.19%	5	0.09%	-354	-6.47%	5,473
Roscommon	1,244	32.35%	2,595	67.47%	7	0.18%	-1,351	-35.13%	3,846
Saginaw	32,171	43.81%	41,081	55.94%	184	0.25%	-8,910	-12.13%	73,436
Sanilac	4,090	28.06%	10,466	71.81%	19	0.13%	-6,376	-43.75%	14,575
Schoolcraft	2,104	50.32%	2,070	49.51%	7	0.17%	34	0.81%	4,181
Shiawassee	8,815	40.07%	13,112	59.61%	71	0.32%	-4,297	-19.53%	21,998
St. Clair	18,797	42.55%	25,317	57.31%	64	0.14%	-6,520	-14.76%	44,178
St. Joseph	5,209	30.62%	11,723	68.90%	82	0.48%	-6,514	-38.29%	17,014
Tuscola	5,301	31.21%	11,658	68.64%	25	0.15%	-6,357	-37.43%	16,984
Van Buren	6,966	35.52%	12,534	63.92%	110	0.56%	-5,568	-28.39%	19,610
Washtenaw	24,308	37.91%	39,592	61.74%	223	0.35%	-15,284	-23.84%	64,123
Wayne	740,942	64.25%	408,287	35.40%	3,981	0.35%	332,655	28.85%	1,153,210
Wexford	2,912	36.99%	4,939	62.74%	21	0.27%	-2,027	-25.75%	7,872
Total	1,643,634	50.48%	1,602,022	49.20%	10,335	0.32%	41,612	1.28%	3,255,991

===== Counties that flipped from Democratic to Republican =====
- Chippewa
- Genesee
- Lake
- Muskegon
