= Eric E. Murphy =

American federal judge (born 1979)

Eric Murphy
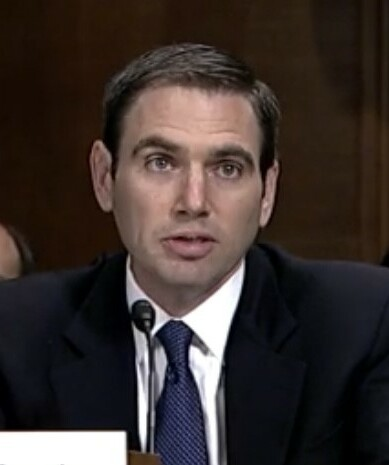

Judge of the United States Court of Appeals for the Sixth Circuit
- Incumbent
- Assumed office March 11, 2019
- Appointed by: Donald Trump
- Preceded by: Alice M. Batchelder

9th Solicitor General of Ohio
- In office September 9, 2013 – January 14, 2019
- Governor: John Kasich
- Preceded by: Alexandra Schimmer
- Succeeded by: Benjamin Michael Flowers

Personal details
- Born: Eric Earl Murphy; 1979 (age 46–47) Indianapolis, Indiana, U.S.
- Party: Republican
- Education: Miami University (BA); University of Chicago (JD)

Eric Earl Murphy (born 1979) is an American lawyer and jurist serving since 2019 as a United States circuit judge of the United States Court of Appeals for the Sixth Circuit. He previously served as the Solicitor General of Ohio from 2013 to 2019.

== Early life and education ==
Murphy was born in 1979 in Indianapolis, Indiana. He graduated from Miami University in 2001 with a Bachelor of Arts, summa cum laude, with Phi Beta Kappa honors. After working as a grocery clerk for a year, he attended the University of Chicago Law School, where he was a member of the University of Chicago Law Review. He graduated in 2005 with a Juris Doctor with high honors and Order of the Coif membership.

== Legal career ==
After law school, Murphy was a law clerk to Judge J. Harvie Wilkinson III of the United States Court of Appeals for the Fourth Circuit from 2005 to 2006 and for Justice Anthony Kennedy of the United States Supreme Court from 2006 to 2007. He then became an associate in the appellate practice of the law firm Jones Day in its Columbus, Ohio office. He became the Solicitor General of Ohio under Attorney General Mike DeWine in 2013.

He is a member of the Federalist Society.

== Federal judicial service ==
On June 7, 2018, President Donald Trump announced his intent to nominate Murphy to serve as a United States Circuit Judge of the United States Court of Appeals for the Sixth Circuit. On June 18, 2018, his nomination was sent to the Senate. President Trump nominated Murphy to the seat on the United States Court of Appeals for the Sixth Circuit being vacated by Judge Alice M. Batchelder, who previously announced her decision to assume senior status on a date to be determined. In June 2018, United States Senator Sherrod Brown said he did not plan to return a blue slip for Murphy's nomination, while United States Senator Rob Portman said he planned to support Murphy's nomination. On October 10, 2018, a hearing on his nomination was held before the Senate Judiciary Committee.

On January 3, 2019, his nomination was returned to the President under Rule XXXI, Paragraph 6 of the United States Senate. On January 23, 2019, President Trump announced his intent to renominate Murphy for a federal judgeship. His nomination was sent to the Senate later that day. On February 7, 2019, his nomination was reported out of committee by a 12–10 vote. On March 6, 2019, the Senate invoked cloture on his nomination by a 53–46 vote. On March 7, 2019, his nomination was confirmed by a 52–46 vote. He received his judicial commission on March 11, 2019.

=== Notable rulings ===
Gun Owners of America, Inc. v. Garland

On December 3, 2021, in Gun Owners of America, Inc. v. Garland, 19 F.4th 980 (6th Cir. 2021), an evenly divided Sixth Circuit affirmed the denial of a preliminary Injunction against a rule issued by the Bureau of Alcohol, Tobacco, Firearms and Explosives (ATF) declaring Bump stock devices to be illegal Machine gun under federal law. Murphy, joined by seven other judges, dissented. He would have enjoined the ATF's new rule, explaining that the "policy debate over whether to ban bump stocks" belongs "with the legislative branch accountable to the people" rather than an administrative agency or the judiciary. In Garland v. Cargill, 602 U.S. 406 (2024), the Supreme Court of the United States ruled 6-3 that bump-stock devices are not machine guns under existing federal law.

Defending Education v. Olentangy

Murphy delivered the majority opinion in Defending Education v. Olentangy (2025), which overturned a school Board of education policy requiring students to use the preferred pronouns of other students. While the board had argued that refusal to do so constituted harassment, the Sixth Circuit panel held that it was a form of legitimate debate that did not cause serious disruption.

== See also ==
- List of law clerks for the first seat of the Supreme Court of the United States

Legal offices
Preceded by Alice M. Batchelder	Judge of the United States Court of Appeals for the Sixth Circuit; 2019–present	Incumbent
