= Alice M. Batchelder =

American judge (born 1944)

Alice Batchelder
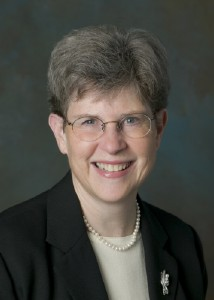

Senior Judge of the United States Court of Appeals for the Sixth Circuit
- Incumbent
- Assumed office March 7, 2019

Chief Judge of the United States Court of Appeals for the Sixth Circuit
- In office August 14, 2009 – August 15, 2014
- Preceded by: Danny Boggs
- Succeeded by: R. Guy Cole Jr.

Judge of the United States Court of Appeals for the Sixth Circuit
- In office December 2, 1991 – March 7, 2019
- Appointed by: George H. W. Bush
- Preceded by: Pierce Lively
- Succeeded by: Eric E. Murphy

Judge of the United States District Court for the Northern District of Ohio
- In office April 4, 1985 – January 4, 1992
- Appointed by: Ronald Reagan
- Preceded by: Seat established
- Succeeded by: Solomon Oliver Jr.

Personal details
- Born: Alice Moore; August 15, 1944 (age 81); Wilmington, Delaware, U.S.
- Spouse: William Batchelder
- Education: Ohio Wesleyan University (BA); University of Akron (JD); University of Virginia (LLM)

Alice M. Moore Batchelder (born August 15, 1944) is an American attorney and jurist. She is currently a senior United States circuit judge of the United States Court of Appeals for the Sixth Circuit. She served as chief judge from 2009 until 2014. She also was considered by President George W. Bush as a potential nominee for a United States Supreme Court seat that ultimately went to Justice Samuel Alito. Her husband William G. Batchelder was a former state Court of Appeals judge and a state legislator, who had served more than 30 years in the Ohio House of Representatives and served as Speaker of the House from 2011 until 2014.

== Education and early career ==
Batchelder was born Alice Moore in Wilmington, Delaware. She graduated from Ohio Wesleyan University in 1964, where she met her future husband, William G. Batchelder. Batchelder received her Juris Doctor degree from the University of Akron School of Law in 1971, and her Master of Laws (LL.M.) degree from the University of Virginia School of Law in 1988. Batchelder briefly taught English and had a private legal practice from 1971 to 1983 in Medina, Ohio, near Cleveland.

== Federal judicial service ==
=== Bankruptcy court service ===
In 1983, Batchelder was appointed a Judge of the United States bankruptcy court for the Northern District of Ohio. Her service as a bankruptcy judge ended on April 4, 1985 when she was elevated to district judge.

=== District court service ===
On February 28, 1985, President Ronald Reagan nominated Batchelder to a seat, created by 98 Stat. 333, on the United States District Court for the Northern District of Ohio. She was confirmed by the United States Senate on April 3, 1985. She received her commission on April 4, 1985. Batchelder's service on the district court position was officially terminated on January 4, 1992, due to her elevation to the court of appeals.

=== Court of appeals service ===
On June 12, 1991, President George H. W. Bush nominated Batchelder to the United States Court of Appeals for the Sixth Circuit to the seat vacated by Pierce Lively. She was confirmed by the Senate on November 27, 1991. She received her commission on December 2, 1991. On August 14, 2009, she became Chief Judge of the Sixth Circuit. She stepped down as chief judge on August 15, 2014, upon turning 70. On September 19, 2017, she announced that she intended to assume senior status upon confirmation of a successor. She assumed senior status on March 7, 2019 when her successor, Eric E. Murphy, was confirmed by the United States Senate.

== See also ==
- George W. Bush Supreme Court candidates

Legal offices
New seat	Judge of the United States District Court for the Northern District of Ohio; 1985–1992	Succeeded by Solomon Oliver Jr.
Preceded by Pierce Lively	Judge of the United States Court of Appeals for the Sixth Circuit; 1991–2019	Succeeded by Eric E. Murphy
Preceded by Danny Julian Boggs	Chief Judge of the United States Court of Appeals for the Sixth Circuit; 2009–2014	Succeeded by R. Guy Cole Jr.
