= Jeffrey Sutton =

American federal judge (born 1960)

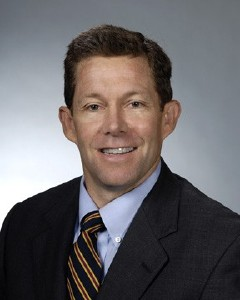

Senior Judge of the United States Court of Appeals for the Sixth Circuit
- Incumbent
- Assumed office October 1, 2026

Chief Judge of the United States Court of Appeals for the Sixth Circuit
- In office May 1, 2021 – October 1, 2026
- Preceded by: R. Guy Cole Jr.
- Succeeded by: Raymond Kethledge

Judge of the United States Court of Appeals for the Sixth Circuit
- In office May 5, 2003 – October 1, 2026
- Appointed by: George W. Bush
- Preceded by: David Aldrich Nelson
- Succeeded by: Benjamin M. Flowers

2nd Solicitor General of Ohio
- In office 1995–1998
- Governor: George Voinovich
- Preceded by: Richard Cordray
- Succeeded by: Edward B. Foley

Personal details
- Born: Jeffrey Stuart Sutton; 1960 (age 65–66) Dhahran, Saudi Arabia
- Education: Williams College (BA); Ohio State University (JD)

Jeffrey Stuart Sutton (born 1960) is an American lawyer and jurist serving as a senior judge of the United States Court of Appeals for the Sixth Circuit. Sutton was appointed to the Sixth Circuit in 2003 by President George W. Bush and served as its chief judge from 2021 to 2026.

== Early life and career ==
Sutton received a Bachelor of Arts degree in history from Williams College in 1983. Sutton worked as a paralegal in Washington, D.C., and spent a summer at an archaeological dig site in Jordan as part of a United States Department of State cultural exchange program, then returned to Ohio to be a high school history teacher and varsity soccer coach at the Columbus Academy, a private school in Gahanna, Ohio.

Sutton received his Juris Doctor from Ohio State University's Moritz College of Law in 1990. He then clerked for Judge Thomas Meskill of the United States Court of Appeals for the Second Circuit from 1990 to 1991. Next he clerked at the United States Supreme Court for Justice Lewis F. Powell Jr., who had assumed senior status, then for Justice Antonin Scalia from 1991 to 1992. Scalia later said that Sutton was "one of the very best law clerks [he] ever had".

Sutton was in private practice in Columbus at the law firm Jones Day from 1992 to 1995 and 1998 to 2003, serving as Solicitor General of Ohio from 1995 to 1998. He has also served as an adjunct professor of law at the Ohio State University Moritz College of Law since 1994 and more recently as a visiting lecturer at Harvard Law School. He teaches state constitutional law, a subject in which he is particularly interested and about which he has written extensively.

== Federal judicial service ==
Sutton was first nominated by President George W. Bush on May 9, 2001, to a seat on the Sixth Circuit vacated by David A. Nelson, who assumed senior status on October 1, 1999. That nomination, made during the 107th United States Congress, never received a floor vote in the United States Senate. Sutton was not confirmed until almost two years later, on April 29, 2003, when the Senate of the 108th United States Congress confirmed him by a 52–41 vote. He received his commission on May 5, 2003. He became Chief Judge on May 1, 2021.

On February 20, 2026, Sutton announced that he would be taking senior status.

=== Notable opinions ===
In 2007, Sutton dissented in part when the Sixth Circuit held that a police officer did not have qualified immunity for arresting a speaker for using foul language at a town meeting. In June 2011, Sutton became the first judge appointed by a Republican to rule in favor of the health care mandate in President Barack Obama's Health Care law.

In November 2014, Sutton authored the 2–1 opinion ruling upholding same-sex marriage bans in Michigan, Kentucky, Ohio, and Tennessee in the Sixth Circuit reversing six previous federal district court rulings. The ruling was the second federal court ruling and the only Federal Court of Appeals ruling to uphold same-sex marriage bans after the U.S. Supreme Court struck down a portion of the Defense of Marriage Act in United States v. Windsor in June 2013. This ran counter to rulings by the U.S. Courts of Appeals for the 4th, 7th, 9th and 10th circuits, which then led the U.S. Supreme Court to grant writ of certiorari to review same-sex marriage bans when it previously declined to do so. In Obergefell v. Hodges the Supreme Court reversed the decision of the Sixth Circuit.

On December 17, 2021, in In re MCP No. 165, OSHA, Interim Final Rule: COVID-19 Vaccination & Testing, 20 F.4th 264 (6th Cir. 2021), Chief Judge Sutton dissented from the denial of initial hearing en banc. The case concerned a rule issued by the Secretary of Labor requiring “roughly 80 million workers to become vaccinated or face a weekly self-financed testing requirement and a daily masking requirement.” Chief Judge Sutton’s opinion argues that the Secretary of Labor lacks “authority to impose this vaccine-or-test mandate.”

On April 12, 2022, in Arizona v. Biden (6th Cir. 2022), Judge Sutton wrote a concurrence suggesting that nationwide injunctions "seem to take the judicial power beyond its traditionally understood uses, permitting district courts to order the government to act or refrain from acting toward nonparties in the case."

On July 8, 2023, Sutton temporarily halted a lower court injunction in United States v. Skrmetti on Tennessee's law banning gender affirming care for minors. The 2-1 ruling, written by Sutton, decided that the plaintiffs "have not shown that a right to new medical treatments is 'deeply rooted in our history and traditions', and thus beyond the democratic process to regulate." Sutton noted the current ruling allowing the ban on gender-affirming care to go into effect is temporary, saying, "We may be wrong." He set a tentative date of September 30, 2023 to have a final judgement on the matter.

On July 12, 2024, in Gore v. Lee (6th Cir. 2024), Chief Judge Sutton authored a majority opinion that upheld a Tennessee law that “treats the sex listed on a birth certificate as a historical fact unchangeable by an individual’s transition to a different gender identity.” The opinion described biological sex as “a medical fact of birth collected by the State about everyone” and rejected arguments that the U.S. Constitution “require[s] Tennessee to change the biological sex listed on the birth certificates of transgender individuals to match their gender identities.” Judge Helene White authored a dissenting opinion arguing that Tennessee impermissibly “classifies individuals based on the State’s generalizations of what it means to be truly male and female.”

=== Feeder Judge ===
"Since joining the bench, Judge Sutton has been one of the most prolific feeder judges, sending a number of his law clerks to the Supreme Court".

=== Other ===
Sutton chaired the Advisory Committee on Appellate Rules of the Judicial Conference of the United States from 2009 to 2012, and served on the committee beginning in 2005. He went on to chair the Committee on Rules of Practice and Procedure from 2012 to 2015.

== Other views ==
On a podcast with Harvard Law School professor Noah Feldman, Judge Sutton, a conservative originalist, expressed the view that the United States Supreme Court's December 2000 decision in Bush v. Gore was wrongly decided.

== Published works ==
- Sutton, Jeffrey S. Browning Symposium Opening Comments. (15 April 2023). Montana Law Review. 84 (2): 9–18.
- Levi, David F., Lohier Jr., Raymond J., Sutton, Jeffrey S., & Wood, Diane P. Losing Faith: Why Public Distrust in the Judiciary Matters - And What Judges Can Do about It. (2022). Judicature. 106 (2): 71–77.
- Sutton, Jeffrey S. What Should Be National and What Should Be Local in American Judicial Review.(2022). The Supreme Court Review. 2022: 191-218
- Rockenbach, John L. & Sutton, Jeffrey S. Respect and Deference in American Administrative Law. (17 November 2022). Boston University Law Review. 102 (6): 1937–1948.
- Sutton, Jeffrey S. 21st Century Federalism: A View from the States. (5 March 2022). Harvard Journal of Law & Public Policy. 46: 31–41.
- Sutton, Jeffrey S. Who Decides?: States as Laboratories of Constitutional Experimentation (Oxford Univ. Press 2021) ISBN 9780197582183
- Scalia, Antonin. 2020. Sutton, Jeffrey S., & Whelan, Edward, ed.s The Essential Scalia: On the Constitution, the Courts, and the Rule of Law (Forum Books 2020) ISBN 9781984824103
- Sutton, Jeffrey S. Response to the University of Illinois Law Review Symposium on 51 Imperfect Solutions. (2020). Illinois Law Review. 2020 (5): 1393–1400.
- Sutton, Jeffrey S. Ruth Bader Ginsburg, the Great Proceduralist. (2020). Ohio State Law Review. 81 (4): 605–609.
- Sutton, Jeffrey S. The Enduring Salience of State Constitutional Law. (12 November 2019). Rutgers University Law Review. 70 (4): 791–801.
- Sutton, Jeffrey S. A Response to Justice Goodwin Liu. (28 March 2019). The Yale Law Journal Forum. 936–942.
- Sutton, Jeffrey S. 51 Imperfect Solutions: States and the Making of American Constitutional Law (Oxford Univ. Press 2018). ISBN 9780190088811
- Sutton, Jeffrey S. Change Agents: Looking to State Constitutions for Rights Innovations. (2018). Judicature. 102 (2): 27–30.
- Sutton, Jeffrey S. 2018 James R. Browning Distinguished Lecture in Law. (16 November 2018). Montana Law Review. 79 (2): 1–12.
- Jones, Brittany & Sutton, Jeffrey S. The Certiorari Process and State Court Decisions. (May 2018). Harvard Law Review. 131 (7): 167–178.
- Sutton, Jeffrey S. Remembering Justice Scalia. (June 2017). Stanford Law Review. 69: 1595–1601.
- Sutton, Jeffrey S. & Webb, Derek A. Bold and Persistent Reform: The 2015 Amendments to the Federal Rules of Civil Procedure and the 2017 Pilot Projects. (Fall 2017). Judicature. 101 (3): 13–21.
- Garner, Bryan A., Bea, Carlos, Berch, Rebecca White, Gorsuch, Neil M., Hartz, Harris L., Hecht, Nathan L., Kavanaugh, Brett M., Kozinski, Alex, Lynch, Sandra L., Pryor Jr., William H., Reavley, Thomas M., Sutton, Jeffrey S., & Wood, Diane P. The Law of Judicial Precedent (Thomson Reuters, 2016). ISBN 9780314634207
- Sutton, Jeffrey S. Courts, Rights, and New Technology: Judging in an Ever-Changing World. (17 September 2014). NYU Journal of Law & Liberty. 8: 260-278
- Sutton, Jeffrey S. Courts as Change Agents: Do We Want More — Or Less?. (14 March 2014). Harvard Law Review. 127 (5): 1419–1445.
- Sutton, Jeffrey S. Barnette, Frankfurter, and Judicial Review. (Fall 2012). Marquette Law Review. 96 (1): 133–150.
- Sutton, Jeffrey S. What Does—and Does Not—Ail State Constitutional Law. (14 May 2011). University of Kansas Law Review. 59: 687–714.
- Holland, Randy J., McAllister, Stephen R., Shaman, Jeffrey M., & Sutton, Jeffrey S. State Constitutional Law: The Modern Experience. (2010). ISBN 9781634596824
- Sutton, Jeffrey S. Hon. David A. Nelson U.S. Court of Appeals for the Sixth Circuit. (11 October 2010). Federal Bar Association.
- Sutton, Jeffrey S. A Review of Richard A. Posner How Judges Think. (2008). Michigan Law Review. 108 (6): 859–876.
- Sutton, Jeffrey S. The Role of History in Judging Disputes About the Meaning of the Constitution. (17 September 2008). Texas Tech Law Review. 41: 1173–1192.
- Sutton, Jeffrey S. Why Teach—And Why Study—State Constitutional Law. (Summer 2009). Oklahoma City University Law Review. 34 (2): 165–178.
- Sutton, Jeffrey S. San Antonio Independent School District v. Rodriguez and its Aftermath. (December 2008). Virginia Law Review. 94 (8): 1963–1986.
- Sutton, Jeffrey S. An Appellate Perspective on Federal Sentencing After Booker and Rita. (1 January 2007). Denver University Law Review. 79: 79-91
- Sutton, Jeffrey S. Measuring Damages Under the United Nations Convention on the International Sale of Goods. (1989). Ohio State Law Journal. 50 (3): 737-752.

== See also ==
- List of law clerks for the first seat of the Supreme Court of the United States
- List of law clerks for the ninth seat of the Supreme Court of the United States

Legal offices
Preceded by David Aldrich Nelson	Judge of the United States Court of Appeals for the Sixth Circuit; 2003–2026	Succeeded by Benjamin M. Flowers
Preceded by R. Guy Cole Jr.	Chief Judge of the United States Court of Appeals for the Sixth Circuit; 2021–2026	Succeeded by Raymond Kethledge
