= James L. Ryan =

American judge (born 1932)

James Ryan
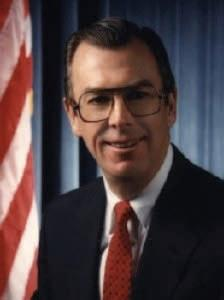

Senior Judge of the United States Court of Appeals for the Sixth Circuit
- Incumbent
- Assumed office January 1, 2000

Judge of the United States Court of Appeals for the Sixth Circuit
- In office October 17, 1985 – January 1, 2000
- Appointed by: Ronald Reagan
- Preceded by: George Clifton Edwards Jr.
- Succeeded by: Raymond Kethledge

Justice of the Michigan Supreme Court
- In office December 2, 1975 – January 1, 1986
- Appointed by: William Milliken
- Preceded by: John Swainson
- Succeeded by: Dennis Archer

Personal details
- Born: James Leo Ryan; November 19, 1932 (age 93) Detroit, Michigan, U.S.
- Children: 4
- Education: University of Detroit (BA, LLB)

James Leo Ryan (born November 19, 1932) is an inactive senior United States circuit judge of the United States Court of Appeals for the Sixth Circuit.

== Early life and education ==
Born in Detroit, Michigan, Ryan graduated from Detroit Catholic Central High School. He received a Bachelor of Laws from the University of Detroit School of Law in 1956. He received a Bachelor of Arts from the University of Detroit in 1992.

== Career ==
Ryan served as a law specialist in the United States Navy and was assigned to the Judge Advocate General and duty with the United States Marine Corps. Upon his release from active duty in 1960, he continued to serve in the Judge Advocate General's Corps of the United States Naval Reserve and, in 1992, retired from the Naval Reserve as a military judge with the rank of captain.

He was in private practice of law in Detroit from 1960 to 1963. He was in private practice of law in Redford, Michigan from 1963 to 1966. He was a justice of the peace in Redford from 1963 to 1966. He was a judge of the circuit court for the Third Judicial Circuit, Michigan from 1966 to 1975. He has been an adjunct professor of law at the University of Detroit since 1974.

He was a justice of the Supreme Court of Michigan from 1975 to 1985, having been appointed by Michigan Governor William G. Milliken. He was an adjunct professor at the Thomas M. Cooley Law School in Lansing, Michigan, from 1979 to 1985.

=== Federal judicial service ===
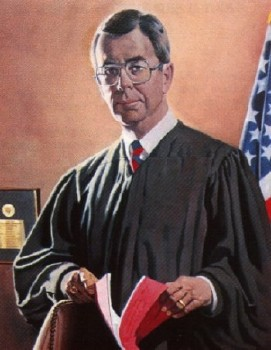
Judicial portrait of Ryan, 1995, by Joseph Maniscalco.

Ryan was nominated by President Ronald Reagan on September 9, 1985, to a seat on the United States Court of Appeals for the Sixth Circuit vacated by Judge George Clifton Edwards Jr. He was confirmed by the United States Senate on October 16, 1985, and received commission on October 17, 1985. He assumed senior status on January 1, 2000. He took inactive senior status on September 3, 2010.

Legal offices
Preceded by George Clifton Edwards Jr.	Judge of the United States Court of Appeals for the Sixth Circuit; 1985–2000	Succeeded by Raymond Kethledge
