= Benjamin M. Flowers =

American judge (born 1987)

Benjamin Flowers
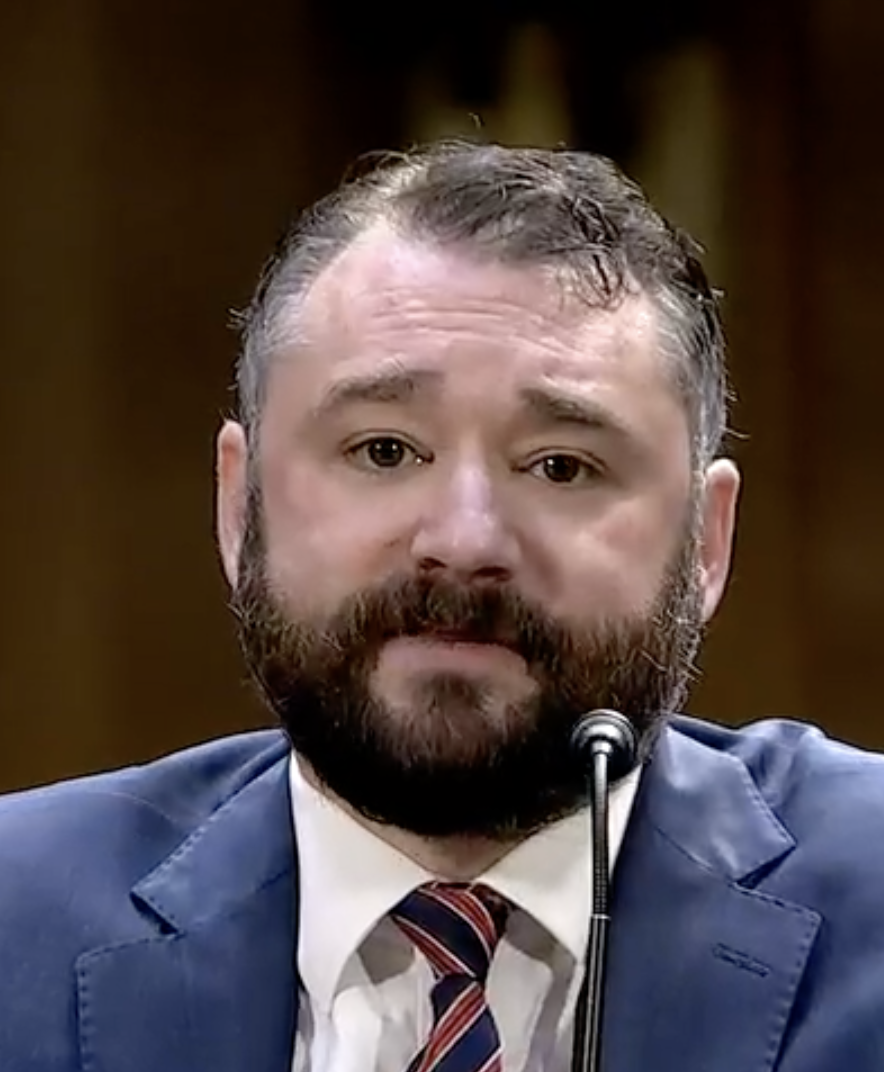

Judge of the United States Court of Appeals for the Sixth Circuit
- Incumbent
- Assumed office October 2, 2026
- Appointed by: Donald Trump
- Preceded by: Jeffrey Sutton

10th Solicitor General of Ohio
- In office January 14, 2019 – October 2023
- Governor: Mike DeWine
- Preceded by: Eric E. Murphy
- Succeeded by: T. Elliot Gaiser

Personal details
- Born: Benjamin Michael Flowers; March 19, 1987 (age 39) Harwinton, Connecticut, U.S.
- Education: Ohio State University (BA); University of Chicago (JD)

Benjamin Michael Flowers (born March 19, 1987) is an American lawyer who served as the 10th Solicitor General of Ohio. He is known for his work in appellate litigation and has represented several cases before the Supreme Court of the United States. Flowers has been recognized for his legal writing and has received awards including the Best Brief Award from the Ohio State Bar Association and from the National Association of Attorneys General. He is a judge on the United States Court of Appeals for the Sixth Circuit.

== Early life and education ==
Flowers was born on March 19, 1987, and raised in Harwinton, Connecticut. He graduated from Lewis S. Mills High School in 2005. He earned a Bachelor of Arts degree from Ohio State University in 2009, graduating summa cum laude in the arts and sciences with research distinction in philosophy. In 2012, he received his Juris Doctor from the University of Chicago Law School, graduating Order of the Coif.

== Career ==
=== Early career ===
Following law school, Flowers served as a law clerk to Judge Sandra Segal Ikuta of the United States Court of Appeals for the Ninth Circuit and later to Justice Antonin Scalia of the Supreme Court of the United States. After his clerkships, Flowers joined the law firm Jones Day at its Columbus office, where he focused on appellate litigation.

=== Solicitor General of Ohio ===
In 2019, Flowers was appointed Solicitor General of Ohio. In this role, he represented the state in appellate courts, including the Supreme Court of the United States, the Ohio Supreme Court, and the United States Court of Appeals for the Sixth Circuit. His work frequently involved matters of federalism and state sovereignty. One of his most high-profile cases was National Federation of Independent Business v. Occupational Safety and Health Administration (commonly referred to in Ohio filings as Ohio v. OSHA), in which the Supreme Court stayed a federal rule requiring large employers to mandate COVID-19 vaccinations or testing for employees, holding that OSHA lacked the authority to impose such a requirement.

Flowers also argued on behalf of the state in other notable cases, including Shoop v. Twyford and Ohio Adjutant General v. FLRA. In Preterm-Cleveland v. McCloud, he defended an Ohio law prohibiting abortions based on a diagnosis of Down syndrome. The United States Court of Appeals for the Sixth Circuit upheld the law, marking the first time a federal appellate court deemed such a restriction constitutional.

In TWISM Enterprises, LLC v. State Board of Registration for Professional Engineers & Surveyors, Flowers represented the Ohio Attorney General as amicus curiae, arguing that Ohio courts are not required to defer to state administrative agencies' interpretations of statutes. The Supreme Court of Ohio agreed, establishing a precedent regarding judicial review of administrative agency interpretations.

In 2020, Flowers received the Ohio State Bar Association's "Best Brief Award" for outstanding legal writing and in 2023, the National Association of Attorneys General's Best Brief Award for excellence in work before the Supreme Court of the United States.

=== Return to private practice ===
In October 2023, Flowers stepped down as Ohio Solicitor General and joined the law firm Ashbrook Byrne Kresge LLC, which is now known as Ashbrook Byrne Kresge Flowers LLC.

=== Federal judicial service ===
On April 9, 2026, President Donald Trump announced his intention to nominate Flowers to an unspecified seat on the United States Court of Appeals for the Sixth Circuit. On April 27, 2026, Trump nominated Flowers to the seat on the Sixth Circuit being vacated by Jeffrey Sutton. On June 18, 2026, the Judiciary Committee advanced his nomination on a 12–10 party line vote. On July 20, 2026, the Senate invoked cloture on his nomination by a 43–40 vote. On July 22, 2026, the Senate confirmed his nomination by a 49–46 vote. He received his judicial commission on October 2, 2026.

== Personal ==
Flowers is married to Denise Vendeland and has three children.

Legal offices
Preceded by Jeffrey Sutton	Judge of the United States Court of Appeals for the Sixth Circuit; 2026–present	Incumbent
