= Edward B. Foley =

American lawyer, legal scholar, and legal theorist

Edward Foley

3rd Solicitor General of Ohio
- In office 1999–2000
- Preceded by: Jeffrey Sutton
- Succeeded by: David Gormley

Personal details
- Education: Yale University (BA); Columbia University (JD)

Edward B. Foley, also known as Ned Foley, is an American lawyer, law professor, election law scholar, and former Ohio Solicitor General. He is the theorist of the blue shift, a phenomenon in American politics in which in-person votes overstate overall percentage of votes for the Republican Party (whose color is red), while provisional votes, which are counted after election day, tend to overstate overall percentage of votes for the Democratic Party (whose color is blue). When the provisional votes are counted after the election, there is often a shift in totals toward the Democrat, or blue, candidate.

== Education and career ==
Foley graduated from Yale in 1983 with a degree in history and from Columbia Law School in 1986. From 1986–1987 he served as a law clerk for Judge Patricia M. Wald of the United States Court of Appeals for the District of Columbia Circuit and from 1988–1989 for U.S. Supreme Court Associate Justice Harry Blackmun.

Foley is a professor of law at Ohio State University's Moritz College of Law, where he has taught since 1991. He served as Ohio's Solicitor General from 1999 to 2000 under Republican Attorney General Betty Montgomery.

Along with Eric Maskin, he has proposed the use of Baldwin's voting method, under the name "Total Vote Runoff", as a way to fix problems with the instant-runoff method ("Ranked Choice Voting") in U.S. jurisdictions that use it, ensuring majority support of the winner and electing more broadly-acceptable candidates.

=== Blue shift ===
Foley coined the term "blue shift" after the 2012 election. An election law scholar, he had been studying closely contested state results to try to predict which might be challenged legally. He wondered whether votes counted after election day tended to affect the final count. He found that election-day vote counts tend to favor Republicans, while when provisionally cast or mail-in votes are counted, the provisional votes tended to favor Democrats; this results in a "blue shift" in final vote counts and the potential for results to change after election day. Foley did not find that mail-in or absentee votes favored either party.

Studying results of presidential elections from 1960 through 2012, Foley found that a "clear and persistent" blue shift had occurred in each election since 2000. Foley theorizes that election reforms in 2000, which made provisional voting easier, favored some demographics that tend to lean Democrat such as lower-income voters, college students, and urban voters, who are likely to have moved since the last election and may not have updated their voter registration.

He found that the size of the shift varied by state, but that it was consistent enough to potentially change the outcome of a presidential election. In 2013 he published a paper about the phenomenon, A Big Blue Shift: Measuring an Asymmetrically Increasing Margin of Litigation.

=== 2020 presidential election ===
According to The New York Times:

What concerns him isn't voting fraud, but rather how a changing vote total that tends to move in one direction can be misunderstood by an anxious public and exploited by politicians eager to preserve any advantage. "It may start to look as if, when an election goes into extra innings, one of the two teams is given extra at-bats".

In 2019 Foley published a paper, Preparing for a Disputed Presidential Election: An Exercise in Election Risk Assessment and Management, in which he posited a scenario in which on election night, Pennsylvania is the crucial state and too close to call, though Donald Trump has a slim lead. As provisional ballots are counted, Trump's lead starts to evaporate and he becomes more and more agitated, tweeting demands that only the election night counts are valid and calling for his supporters to "STOP THIS THEFT RIGHT NOW!!!" "DON'T LET THEM STEAL THIS ELECTION FROM YOU!!!", calling it a plausible scenario. According to The Philadelphia Inquirer he believes "raising awareness of the blue shift can help inoculate people against unfounded claims."

In March 2020 Foley and MIT political scientist Charles Stewart updated a paper, Explaining the Blue Shift in Election Canvassing, which found that "the bluer the state, the greater the shift", which had first been published in 2015.

Foley in August 2020 said expected increases in numbers of votes cast by mail because of the coronavirus pandemic could affect the size and direction of the shift in the November 2020 US presidential election. He told The New York Times "We're setting ourselves up for an election where neither side can concede defeat. That suggests that the desire to dispute the outcome is going to be higher than ever."

=== National Task Force on Election Crises ===
Foley participated in a 2019 bipartisan task force, the National Task Force on Election Crises, to envision, assess, and develop plans for dealing with an election crisis. Among the scenarios considered but not included in the 200-page report was a pandemic that kept people from voting in-person. The task force published pandemic-related recommendations after the coronavirus pandemic struck.

== Book ==
- Foley, Edward. Ballot Battles: The History of Disputed Elections in the United States. New York: Oxford University Press. 2016. (978-0190235277).

== See also ==
- List of law clerks for the second seat of the Supreme Court of the United States
