= R. Guy Cole Jr. =

American judge (born 1951)

Guy Cole
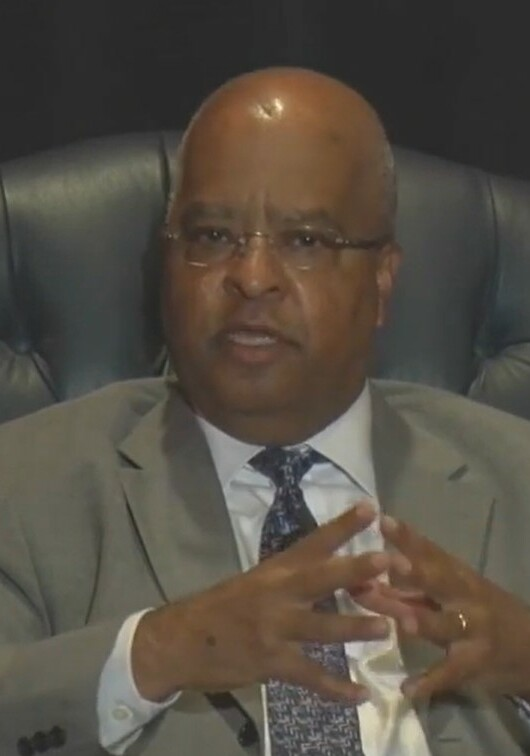
- Cole in 2017

Senior Judge of the United States Court of Appeals for the Sixth Circuit
- Incumbent
- Assumed office January 9, 2023

Chief Judge of the United States Court of Appeals for the Sixth Circuit
- In office August 15, 2014 – May 1, 2021
- Preceded by: Alice M. Batchelder
- Succeeded by: Jeffrey Sutton

Judge of the United States Court of Appeals for the Sixth Circuit
- In office December 26, 1995 – January 9, 2023
- Appointed by: Bill Clinton
- Preceded by: Nathaniel R. Jones
- Succeeded by: Rachel Bloomekatz

Personal details
- Born: Ransey Guy Cole Jr. May 23, 1951 (age 74) Birmingham, Alabama, U.S.
- Education: Tufts University (BA); Yale University (JD)

Ransey Guy Cole Jr. (born May 23, 1951) is a senior United States circuit judge of the United States Court of Appeals for the Sixth Circuit.

== Early life and education ==
Cole was born in Birmingham, Alabama and attended Cheshire Academy in Connecticut. He earned a Bachelor of Arts degree from Tufts University in 1972 and a Juris Doctor from Yale Law School in 1975.

== Professional career ==
Cole worked as an associate in private practice with the law firm Vorys, Sater, Seymour and Pease in Columbus, Ohio from 1975 until 1978. Upon joining the firm in 1975, he was just the second African-American at the firm, and in 1983, he became its first African-American partner. He joined the United States Department of Justice and worked as a trial attorney in the commercial litigation branch of the United States Department of Justice Civil Division from 1978 until 1980. He then transitioned back into private practice at Vorys Sater in Columbus, Ohio from 1980 until 1986. Cole became a United States Bankruptcy Judge for the Southern District of Ohio from 1987 until 1993. He returned to private practice in Columbus at Vorys Sater from 1993 until becoming an appeals court judge in 1995.

== Federal judicial service ==
President Bill Clinton nominated Cole to a seat on the United States Court of Appeals for the Sixth Circuit on June 29, 1995, to replace Judge Nathaniel R. Jones, who assumed senior status on May 13, 1995. Although Republicans controlled the United States Senate at that time, Cole's nomination was considered uncontroversial. The Senate Judiciary Committee unanimously recommended Cole's confirmation on October 26, 1995. The Senate unanimously confirmed Cole by a voice vote on December 22, 1995. He received his commission on December 26, 1995. Cole served as Chief Judge from August 15, 2014, to May 1, 2021. On December 10, 2021, he announced his intent to assume senior status upon confirmation of a successor. He assumed senior status on January 9, 2023.

In 2021, Cole received the Professionalism Award from the American Inns of Court Foundation. And in 2022, the American College of Bankruptcy elected Cole as a Fellow.

== Notable cases ==
On January 5, 2022, Cole partially dissented in a 2-1 decision that upheld an injunction against an executive order requiring federal contractors to ensure that their workers get the COVID-19 vaccine.

== See also ==
- List of African-American federal judges
- List of African-American jurists

Legal offices
Preceded by Nathaniel R. Jones	Judge of the United States Court of Appeals for the Sixth Circuit; 1995–2023	Succeeded by Rachel Bloomekatz
Preceded by Alice M. Batchelder	Chief Judge of the United States Court of Appeals for the Sixth Circuit; 2014–2021	Succeeded by Jeffrey Sutton
