= Solicitor General of Ohio =

American state official

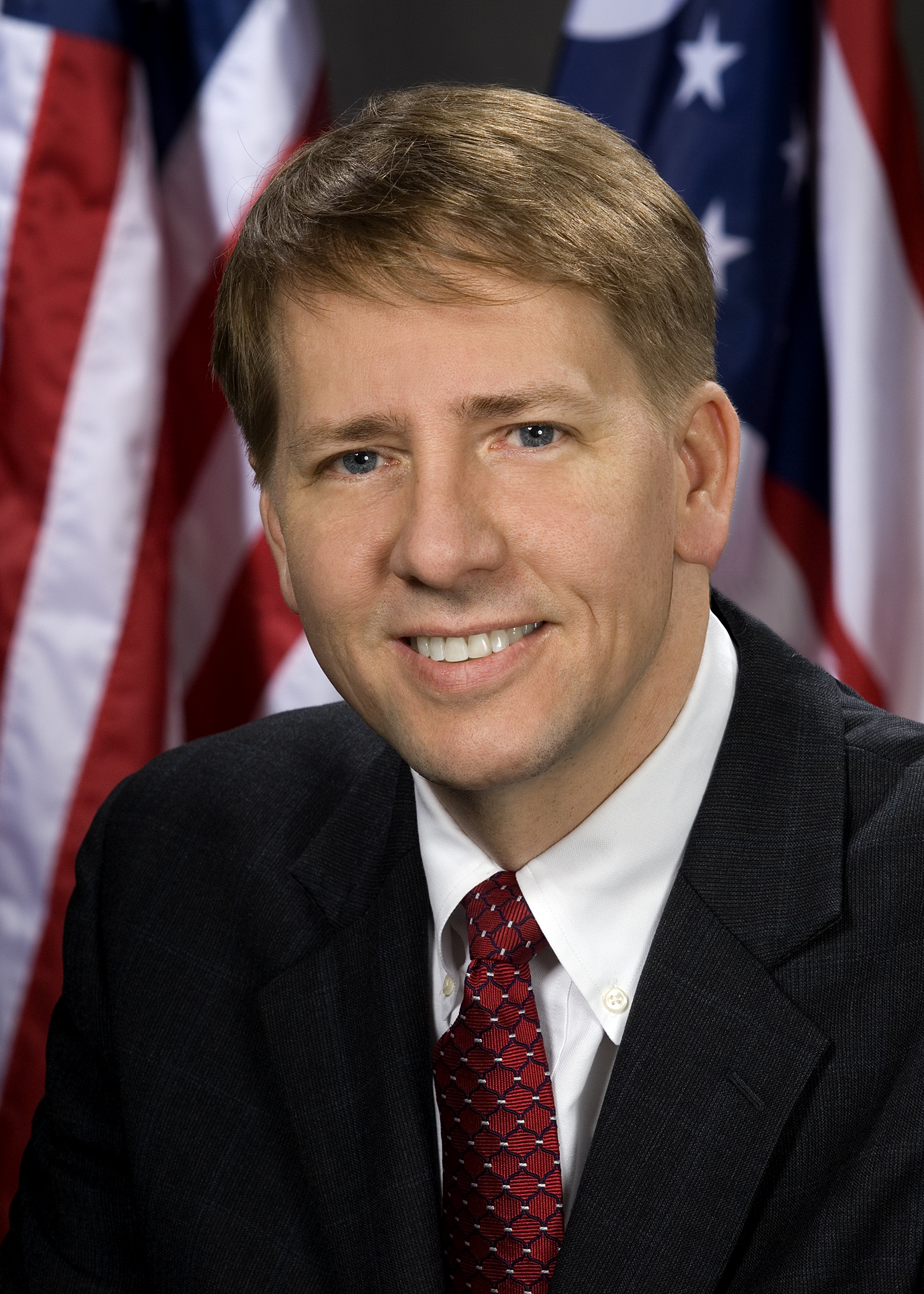
Richard Cordray was the first Solicitor General of Ohio.

The Solicitor General of Ohio, Ohio Solicitor General, State Solicitor of Ohio, or Ohio State Solicitor is the top appellate solicitor or lawyer for the U.S. state of Ohio. It is an appointed position in the Office of the Ohio Attorney General that focuses on the office's major appellate cases. The majority of the cases handled by the Solicitor are argued in the United States Supreme Court or the Supreme Court of Ohio. However some cases within the Solicitor's responsibilities are under the jurisdiction of the United States Court of Appeals for the 6th Circuit and the state appellate courts. The Solicitor represents the Attorney General of Ohio before the Supreme Court of Ohio and other appellate courts, as needed. The Solicitor's office writes most of the amicus briefs filed by the Ohio attorney general’s office.

== History ==
"In any claimed appeal of right or discretionary appeal in which the state is not a party but nevertheless may have an interest, the Supreme Court may invite the state solicitor to file a jurisdictional memorandum expressing the views of the state before making its determination of jurisdiction."

— Supreme Court of Ohio Rule III, Section 6(E).

The position was created in 1993 by Ohio Attorney General Lee Fisher and was first filled by Richard Cordray. It is a similar position to Solicitors in many states and is modeled after the United States Solicitor General. By 2003, twenty-nine states had Solicitors General, although only eight had them fifteen years earlier. Initially, the Solicitor had no support staff except a secretary. In 1999, two "associate solicitors" began to work with the state solicitor in the attorney general’s office with an exclusive focus on appellate litigation. In addition to the solicitor and his assistants, The Simon Karas Fellowship program which was instituted in 2000, supports one lawyer each year to focus on appellate litigation soon after completion of law school or a judicial clerkship. It is not a statutory position in Ohio, but since April 2002 the Supreme Court of Ohio has recognized it in its rules. In the first ten years of the position, three former United States Supreme Court Clerks held the appointment.

The Solicitor does not always argue constitutional law. Cordray, who served under then-Attorney General Lee Fisher until Betty Montgomery won the position in 1994, argued a technical criminal case on Halloween day in 1993 when the post was created.

Most states' attorneys general offices have had separate divisions with chiefs specializing in state and federal appellate works. Organizing the department with a separate solicitor general is a model that states are using in an attempt to promote the professionalism and quality of the work. This strategy generally gives the attorney general more of a specialist who may be somewhat of a legal scholar on staff. Also, the solicitor is typically someone who was not involved in the attorney general's campaign and is thus someone who is more likely to offer a different perspective than other lawyers who are entrenched in the department.

== List of Solicitors General ==
Years	Ohio State Solicitor	Ohio Attorney General
1993–1994	Richard Cordray	Lee Fisher
1995–1998	Jeffrey Sutton	Betty Montgomery
1999–2000	Edward B. Foley	Betty Montgomery
2000–2003	David Gormley	Betty Montgomery
2003–2006	Douglas R. Cole	Jim Petro
2006–2008	Bill Marshall	Marc Dann
2008–2011	Benjamin C. Mizer	Nancy H. Rogers; Richard Cordray
2011–2013	Alexandra Schimmer	Mike DeWine
2013–2019	Eric E. Murphy	Mike DeWine
2019–2023	Benjamin M. Flowers	Dave Yost
2023–2025	Elliot Gaiser	Dave Yost
2025–present	Mathura Sridharan	Dave Yost; Andy Wilson
