= Raymond Kethledge =

American judge (born 1966)

- Kethledge in 2026

Chief Judge of the United States Court of Appeals for the Sixth Circuit
- Incumbent
- Assumed office October 1, 2026
- Preceded by: Jeffrey Sutton

Judge of the United States Court of Appeals for the Sixth Circuit
- Incumbent
- Assumed office July 7, 2008
- Appointed by: George W. Bush
- Preceded by: James L. Ryan

Personal details
- Born: Raymond Michael Kethledge; December 11, 1966 (age 59) Summit, New Jersey, U.S.
- Party: Republican
- Spouse: Jessica Levinson (m. 1993)
- Children: 2
- Relatives: Raymond W. Ketchledge (grandfather)
- Education: University of Michigan (BA, JD)

Raymond Michael Kethledge (born December 11, 1966) is the chief judge of the United States Court of Appeals for the Sixth Circuit. He was appointed to the Sixth Circuit by President George W. Bush in 2008 and has served as its chief judge since October 1, 2026. Kethledge appeared on Donald Trump's list of potential Supreme Court of the United States nominees in 2016, and was described by press reports as a finalist in President Trump's nomination to replace Anthony Kennedy on the court.

== Early life and education ==
Kethledge was born in Summit, New Jersey, the son of Diane and Ray Kethledge. His paternal grandfather was Raymond W. Ketchledge, an engineer who invented an acoustically guided torpedo that was used to sink dozens of German U-boats during World War II.

Kethledge grew up in Michigan, and has since lived in Michigan, with the exception of the three years he worked while in Washington, D.C. Kethledge graduated from Birmingham Groves High School in the Birmingham Public School District. He attended the University of Michigan, graduating in 1989 with a Bachelor of Arts degree in history. He then attended the University of Michigan Law School, graduating in 1993 ranked second in his class with a Juris Doctor, magna cum laude. He is a member of the Republican Party.

== Career ==
After graduating from law school, Kethledge clerked for Judge Ralph B. Guy Jr. of the U.S. Court of Appeals for the Sixth Circuit from 1994 to 1995. After finishing his clerkship, he served as judiciary counsel to Michigan Senator Spencer Abraham from 1995 to 1997. Following that, Kethledge clerked for Associate Justice Anthony Kennedy of the Supreme Court of the United States from 1997–1998, where he worked alongside Stephanos Bibas in Justice Kennedy's chambers. Other notable clerks during the same term were Mary-Rose Papandrea and Sri Srinivasan, for Justices Souter and O'Connor, respectively.

After completing his Supreme Court clerkship, Kethledge returned to Michigan in 1998 to join the law firm of Honigman, Miller, Schwartz & Cohn, where he became a partner. In 2001, he joined Ford Motor Company as in-house counsel in the company's Dearborn headquarters. He later joined Feeney, Kellett, Wienner & Bush as a partner. In 2003, Kethledge co-founded a boutique law firm, now known as Bush, Seyferth & Paige, with its office in Troy, Michigan. In addition to his duties as a federal judge, Kethledge has taught courses at the University of Michigan Law School, including "Fundamentals of Appellate Practice," which focuses on the elements of good legal writing, and Federal Courts.

== Federal judicial service ==
Kethledge was first nominated to the United States Court of Appeals for the Sixth Circuit by President George W. Bush on June 28, 2006, to replace Judge James L. Ryan. From November 2001 to March 2006, Henry Saad had been nominated to the seat, but he had been filibustered by the Senate Democrats and later withdrew. Kethledge's nomination lapsed when the 109th Congress adjourned in December 2006. Bush again nominated Kethledge on March 19, 2007. However, his nomination stalled for over a year due to opposition from Michigan's two Democratic Senators, Carl Levin and Debbie Stabenow.

In April 2008, the Bush Administration struck a deal with Levin and Stabenow to break the logjam on judicial nominees to federal courts in Michigan. In exchange for Levin and Stabenow supporting Kethledge's nomination (and that of United States Attorney Stephen J. Murphy III to a district court position), Bush also nominated Democratic Michigan state judge Helene White, a former Clinton nominee to the Sixth Circuit who had been married to Levin's cousin at the time of her first nomination. Soon afterwards, Kethledge, White, and Murphy were all nominated as a bipartisan package of nominees and granted a joint hearing before the Senate Judiciary Committee on May 7, 2008. Kethledge was voted out of committee by voice vote on June 12, 2008. On June 24, 2008, he was confirmed by voice vote, almost exactly two years after his original nomination. He received his commission on July 7, 2008.

In 2014, The Wall Street Journal's 'Review & Outlook' editorial described Kethledge's ruling in EEOC v. Kaplan as the "Opinion of the Year". In 2016, in another 'Review & Outlook' editorial, the Wall Street Journal cited Kethledge's opinion in In re United States, 817 F.3d 953 (6th Cir. 2016), saying: "Writing for a unanimous three-judge panel, Judge Raymond Kethledge dismantled that argument and excoriated the IRS for stonewalling..." Commentators have noted that Kethledge has "broadly criticized judicial deference and specifically criticized deference to federal agencies under Chevron" and "has set himself apart as a dedicated defender of the Constitution's structural protections."

In May 2016, Kethledge was included on President Donald Trump's list of potential Supreme Court justices. On July 2, 2018, Kethledge was one of the four circuit judges given a personal 45-minute interview in consideration of the vacancy created by Justice Kennedy's retirement.

In October 2019, Judge Kethledge became chair of the Advisory Committee on Criminal Rules. He has served on the committee since 2013.

=== Judge Kethledge's originalism ===
In July 2018, conservative radio host Hugh Hewitt wrote an op-ed in The Washington Post endorsing Kethledge for the seat left vacant by Associate Justice of the Supreme Court of the United States Anthony Kennedy's retirement and declared, "Kethledge has been faithful for more than a decade to the originalist approach." In Turner v. United States, 885 F.3d 949, 955 (6th Cir. 2018), Kethledge joined a concurring opinion that argued "faithful adherence to the Constitution and its Amendments requires us to examine their terms as they were commonly understood when the text was adopted and ratified." In Tyler v. Hillsdale Cty. Sheriff's Dep't, 837 F.3d 678, 710 (6th Cir. 2016). Kethledge joined a concurring opinion that quoted District of Columbia v. Heller and declared, "What determines the scope of the right to bear arms are the 'historical justifications' that gave birth to it."

== Book ==
In 2017, Kethledge coauthored a book with Michael S. Erwin, a West Point graduate and military veteran. The book, entitled Lead Yourself First: Inspiring Leadership Through Solitude, details how leaders can benefit from solitude. Among the leaders profiled in the book are Pope John Paul II, General Dwight D. Eisenhower, Reverend Martin Luther King, Jr., and many others. Through these profiles, Kethledge illustrates how leaders must identify their first principles "with enough clarity and conviction to hold fast to [them]—even when, inevitably, there are great pressures to yield." Doing so, Kethledge writes, requires "conviction of purpose, and the moral courage" to choose principle over popularity.

The book has been reviewed on Above The Law, in The Washington Post, and in Publishers Weekly. The Wall Street Journal said the book "makes a compelling argument for the integral relationship between solitude and leadership."

== Notable opinions ==
The Green Bag Almanac has recognized Judge Kethledge for "exemplary legal writing" in two different years: in 2013 (for Bennett v. State Farm Mutual Automobile Insurance) and in 2017 (for Wayside Church v. Van Buren County).

=== Major cases ===
- In 2008, Kethledge wrote a concurrence when the full en banc circuit agreed with the Ohio Republican Party's claim that the Help America Vote Act required the state to match voters' registrations with other public records. In October 2008, the Supreme Court unanimously reversed that judgment in an unsigned opinion.
- In Michigan v. Bay Mills Indian Community (2012), Kethledge wrote for a unanimous court when it found that tribal sovereign immunity and the Indian Gaming Regulatory Act prevented the state from blocking construction of an Indian casino. In May 2014, the Supreme Court affirmed that judgment by a vote of 5–4.
- In May 2013, Kethledge wrote for the en banc circuit when it affirmed the death sentence of Marvin Gabrion. Gabrion had murdered Rachel Timmerman, a 19-year-old woman who had reported him for raping her. He bound and gagged her, tied her to concrete blocks, and drowned her in a weedy lake. Because he murdered Timmerman in a national forest, Gabrion committed a federal crime and was also eligible for the death penalty even though the surrounding State of Michigan had outlawed that penalty. The United States charged Gabrion with murder. A jury convicted him and imposed the death penalty. On appeal, Gabrion argued that the district court should have allowed him to argue to the jury that a death sentence was unfair because he would have been ineligible for that sentence had he murdered Timmerman in nearby Michigan territory. According to Gabrion, the murder's location was a "circumstances of the offense" and thus the kind of "mitigating factor" the Eighth Amendment and Federal Death Penalty Act allow a jury to weigh during sentencing. Writing for a majority of the en banc court, Judge Kethledge rejected that challenge. He wrote that not every "circumstance of the offense" is a "mitigating" factor; otherwise, jurors could consider the "moonphase" during sentencing. Kethledge further explained that mitigating evidence is evidence relevant to a "reasoned moral response to the defendant's background, character, and crime," and that the murder's location was not that kind of evidence.
- In Bailey v. Callaghan (2013), the Sixth Circuit considered the constitutionality of a Michigan law that made it illegal for public-school employers to use their resources to collect union dues. As a result of the law, unions had to collect their own membership dues from public-school employees. A number of Michigan public-school unions and union members filed suit, alleging that the law was unconstitutional. Judge Kethledge, writing for the majority, disagreed. The law does not violate the First Amendment, Judge Kethledge explained, because the law "does not restrict the unions' speech at all: they remain free to speak about whatever they wish." As for the unions' Equal Protection challenge, Kethledge first observed: "The applicability of rational-basis review is a strong signal that the issue is one for resolution by the democratic process rather than by the courts." Judge Kethledge then went on to conclude that there is a conceivable legitimate interest in restricting the use of public-school resources. As a result, the law does not violate the Equal Protection Clause.
- Kethledge recused himself when the en banc circuit found that Michigan voters could not amend their constitution to ban affirmative action. In Schuette v. Coalition to Defend Affirmative Action (2014), a plurality of the Supreme Court reversed that judgment by a vote of 6–2.
- In EEOC v. Kaplan Higher Education Corp., 748 F.3d 749 (6th Cir. 2014), the EEOC alleged that Kaplan's policy of running credit checks on job applicants had a "disparate impact" on African American applicants. To support its claim, the EEOC hired an expert witness who reviewed an unrepresentative sample of Kaplan job applications and asserted that the credit checks had flagged more African American applicants for scrutiny than white applicants. The purported expert had identified the applicants' races by tasking "race raters" with "eyeballing" the applicants' drivers' license photos. The District Court struck the expert's analysis as unreliable. On appeal, Judge Kethledge wrote a unanimous opinion affirming. He explained that the EEOC had relied on a "homemade methodology, crafted by a witness with no particular expertise to craft it, administered by persons with no particular expertise to administer it, tested by no one, and accepted only by the witness himself." The Wall Street Journal's Editorial Board later commended Judge Kethledge for writing the "Opinion of the Year" and delivering a "sublime" "legal smackdown" that "eviscerated the EEOC like a first-day law student."
- In In re United States, 817 F.3d 953 (6th Cir. 2016), the NorCal Tea Party Patriots filed a class action against the IRS for targeting conservative groups "for mistreatment based on their political views." The district court ordered the IRS to disclose, among other internal records, the list of the groups it had targeted. Rather than complying with that order, the IRS appealed. In an opinion for the unanimous majority, Judge Kethledge called the allegations "[a]mong the most serious [] a federal court can address" and, according to the Wall Street Journal, "excoriated the IRS for stonewalling during discovery." Judge Kethledge ordered the IRS to "comply with the district court's discovery orders . . . without redactions, and without further delay." And he rebuked the IRS's attorneys for failing to uphold the Justice Department's "long and storied tradition of defending the nation's interest and enforcing its laws—all of them, not just selective ones—in a manner worthy of the Department's name." That opinion was also praised by the Wall Street Journal's Editorial Board.
- In United States v. Carpenter (2016), Kethledge wrote for the divided court when it found that the Fourth Amendment to the United States Constitution did not require police to get a warrant before obtaining the cell site location information of a mobile phone. In June 2018, the Supreme Court reversed that judgment by a vote of 5–4.
- In June 2017, Kethledge wrote for the en banc circuit when it, by a vote of 8–6, rejected the claims of Gary Otte, Ronald Phillips, and Raymond Tibbetts that the method of capital punishment in Ohio violated the Eighth Amendment to the United States Constitution.

=== Other cases ===
- In 2012, in an opinion by Kethledge in Sierra Club v. Korleski, the Sixth Circuit rejected the argument by environmental groups and the federal Environmental Protection Agency that private persons can sue the State of Ohio under the Clean Air Act's citizen-suit provision to enforce a state-enacted pollution-control plan against minor polluters. The court held, based on Bennett v. Spear, that the citizen-suit provision does not permit a citizen to sue a state for its failure to perform a regulatory duty. Kethledge wrote that, "[i]n construing a statute, the words matter." And the court overturned its own precedent reaching the opposite conclusion as superseded by Bennett, describing the earlier decision as "a bottle of dubious vintage, whose contents turned to vinegar long ago, and which we need not consume here."
- Also in 2012, in United States v. CTH, a district court found, by a "preponderance" of the evidence, that the defendant had distributed enough heroin to qualify for up to a 60-month maximum sentence rather than a shorter 12-month maximum sentence. Writing for the court, Kethledge confronted the question whether the Due Process Clause required the district court to find the heroin quantity at the higher standard of "beyond a reasonable doubt." To resolve the case, Kethledge applied the relevant Supreme Court precedent. He noted that, in In re Winship, the Supreme Court held: "[T]he Due Process Clause protects the accused against conviction except upon proof beyond a reasonable doubt of every fact necessary to constitute the crime with which he is charged." And in Apprendi, which rests on Winship, the Supreme Court "held that '… such facts'—meaning facts increasing a defendant's statutory-maximum sentence—'must be established by proof beyond a reasonable doubt.'" Faced with this precedent, Kethledge found the government's arguments meritless, writing: "The government, for its part, offers no path out of this box canyon of precedent. . . . The government gives us no reason, therefore, not to apply Apprendi's due-process holding to CTH's case." The court thus held that the district court's drug-quantity finding should have been made beyond a reasonable doubt.
- In Waldman v. Stone, the Sixth Circuit held, in an opinion by Kethledge, that bankruptcy courts lack constitutional authority to enter final judgment on a state-law claim brought by a debtor to augment the estate, even where both parties consent to resolution by a bankruptcy court. The Sixth Circuit concluded that to grant final judgment on those claims would be to exercise the judicial power of the United States, which bankruptcy judges may not do because they lack the life tenure and salary protection guaranteed by Article III of the Constitution, and this infringement on the separation of powers cannot be waived by private litigants. The Supreme Court later reached the opposite conclusion in Wellness International Network, Ltd. v. Sharif, 1353 S. Ct. 1932 (2015), over the dissent of Chief Justice Roberts, joined by Justices Scalia and Thomas.
- In United States v. Bistline, 665 F.3d 758 (6th Cir. 2013), Richard Bistline pled guilty to knowingly possessing child pornography. Under the Sentencing Guidelines, Bistline's recommended sentence was 63 to 78 months' imprisonment. The district court rejected that recommendation, however, on the ground that Congress had written the relevant guideline itself, rather than allowing the Sentencing Commission to do so. The court then sentenced Bistline to a single night's confinement in the courthouse lockup, plus ten years' supervised release. The Sixth Circuit, in an opinion by Judge Kethledge, vacated that sentence as substantively unreasonable. Judge Kethledge explained that the Commission had the authority to fix criminal penalties only because Congress had given the Commission that authority. Thus, saying that "Congress has encroached too much on the Commission's authority" was "like saying a Senator has encroached upon the authority of her chief of staff, or a federal judge upon that of his law clerk." It may be true that Congress had marginalized the Sentencing Commission's role, Judge Kethledge concluded, but "Congress can marginalize the Commission all it wants: Congress created it."
- In United States v. Hughes, 733 F.3d 642 (6th Cir. 2013), Albert Hughes pled guilty to federal drug charges and was sentenced to the mandatory minimum. The Sixth Circuit later vacated his sentence and remanded for resentencing. Before the resentencing could occur, Congress passed the Fair Sentencing Act, which reduced the applicable mandatory minimum. The district court nevertheless reinstated the same sentence. The Sixth Circuit affirmed. In an opinion by Judge Kethledge, the court held that a crime's penalty is normally the one on the books when the crime was committed, and Hughes could not point to anything that overcame that presumption. The court also rejected the argument that three other statutory provisions, when read together, created a "background sentencing principle" that the court should follow the latest views of Congress and the Sentencing Commission. Judge Kethledge explained that this argument "has little to do with what the statutes actually say, and more to do, apparently, with one's perception of their mood or animating purpose." He continued: "But statutes are not artistic palettes, from which the court can daub different colors until it obtains a desired effect. Statutes are instead law, which are bounded in a meaningful sense by the words that Congress chose in enacting them."
- In In re Dry Max Pampers Litigation, 724 F.3d 713 (6th Cir. 2013), the Sixth Circuit reviewed a class-action settlement agreement that awarded each named plaintiff $1000 per child, awarded class counsel $2.73 million, and "provide[d] the unnamed class members with nothing but nearly worthless injunctive relief." Judge Kethledge, writing for the majority, rejected the settlement as unfair. He found that the parties' assertions regarding the value of the settlement to unnamed class members were "premised upon a fictive world, where harried parents of young children clip and retain Pampers UPC codes for years on end, where parents lack the sense (absent intervention by P&G) to call a doctor when their infant displays symptoms like boils and weeping discharge, where those same parents care as acutely as P&G does about every square centimeter of a Pampers box, and where parents regard Pampers.com, rather than Google, as their portal for important information about their children's health." As a result, Judge Kethledge explained, "[t]he relief that the settlement provide[d] to unnamed class member [was] illusory. But one fact about this settlement is concrete and indisputable: $2.73 million is $2.73 million." Judge Kethledge also found that the named plaintiffs were inadequate representatives of the class. "The $1000-per-child payments," Judge Kethledge concluded, "provided a disincentive for the class members to care about the adequacy of the relief afforded to unnamed class members, and instead encouraged the class representatives 'to compromise the interest of the class for personal gain.'"
- In John B. v. Emkes, 710 F.3d 394 (6th Cir. 2013), a federal district court had entered a consent decree governing the steps that Tennessee's Medicaid Program had to take in order to achieve and maintain compliance with the Medicaid Act. Tennessee later moved to vacate the consent decree largely on the ground that the state was in substantial compliance with the decree's provisions. The district court granted the motion. In an opinion by Judge Kethledge, the Sixth Circuit affirmed. Judge Kethledge explained that Tennessee was in substantial compliance with all but one part of the decree. He then explained that the failure to comply with that provision did not justify continuing federal control of the state's Medicaid program. "Consent decrees are not entitlements," Judge Kethledge wrote; instead, "a decree may remain in force only as long as it continues to remedy a violation of federal law." And because Tennessee had brought its Medicaid program into compliance with the Medicaid Act, continued enforcement of the decree was not only unnecessary, but improper.
- In Shane Group, Inc. v. Blue Cross Blue Shield of Michigan, 825 F.3d 299 (6th Cir. 2016), Blue Cross customers filed a class action alleging that Blue Cross conspired with hospitals throughout Michigan to artificially inflate insurance rates by a total of more than $13 billion. Class Counsel and Blue Cross, however, agreed to settle the claims for only $30 million, largely on the basis of an expert report that the district court had sealed from public view. The district court refused to let the absent class members examine the sealed report and then approved the settlement over their objections and without meaningful scrutiny. Judge Kethledge, writing for a unanimous panel, vacated the settlement agreement and ordered the district court to unseal the substantive filings, restart the objection process, and ensure that the proposed settlement agreement received meaningful scrutiny on remand.
- In Wheaton v. McCarthy, 800 F.3d 282 (6th Cir. 2015), the Sixth Circuit held, in an opinion by Judge Kethledge, that an Ohio administrative agency had unreasonably determined that the statutory term "family" did not include a Medicare beneficiary's live-in spouse. The court noted that some statutory terms "are ambiguous only at the margins, while clearly encompassing a certain core." Thus, "[t]he term 'planet' might be ambiguous as applied to Pluto, but is clear as applied to Jupiter."

== Personal life ==
Kethledge is married to Jessica Levinson Kethledge, who worked for the Red Cross. They have a son and daughter. Kethledge is an evangelical Protestant Christian.

When Kethledge is in northern Michigan, he works in an office he created in a family barn near Lake Huron. The office has a wood stove for heat and a pine desk for a work space. He has spoken publicly about hunting with his son in the Michigan wilderness.

== Affiliations ==
Kethledge was elected to the American Law Institute in 2013 and currently serves as an adviser to the Institute's panel preparing its Restatement of the Law, Consumer Contracts.

== See also ==
- List of law clerks for the first seat of the Supreme Court of the United States
- Donald Trump Supreme Court candidates

Legal offices
| Preceded by James L. Ryan | Judge of the United States Court of Appeals for the Sixth Circuit; 2008–present | Incumbent |
| Preceded by Jeffrey Sutton | Chief Judge of the United States Court of Appeals for the Sixth Circuit; 2026–present | Incumbent |
