= 1962 Michigan gubernatorial election =

- November 6, 1962
- Turnout: 35.34%
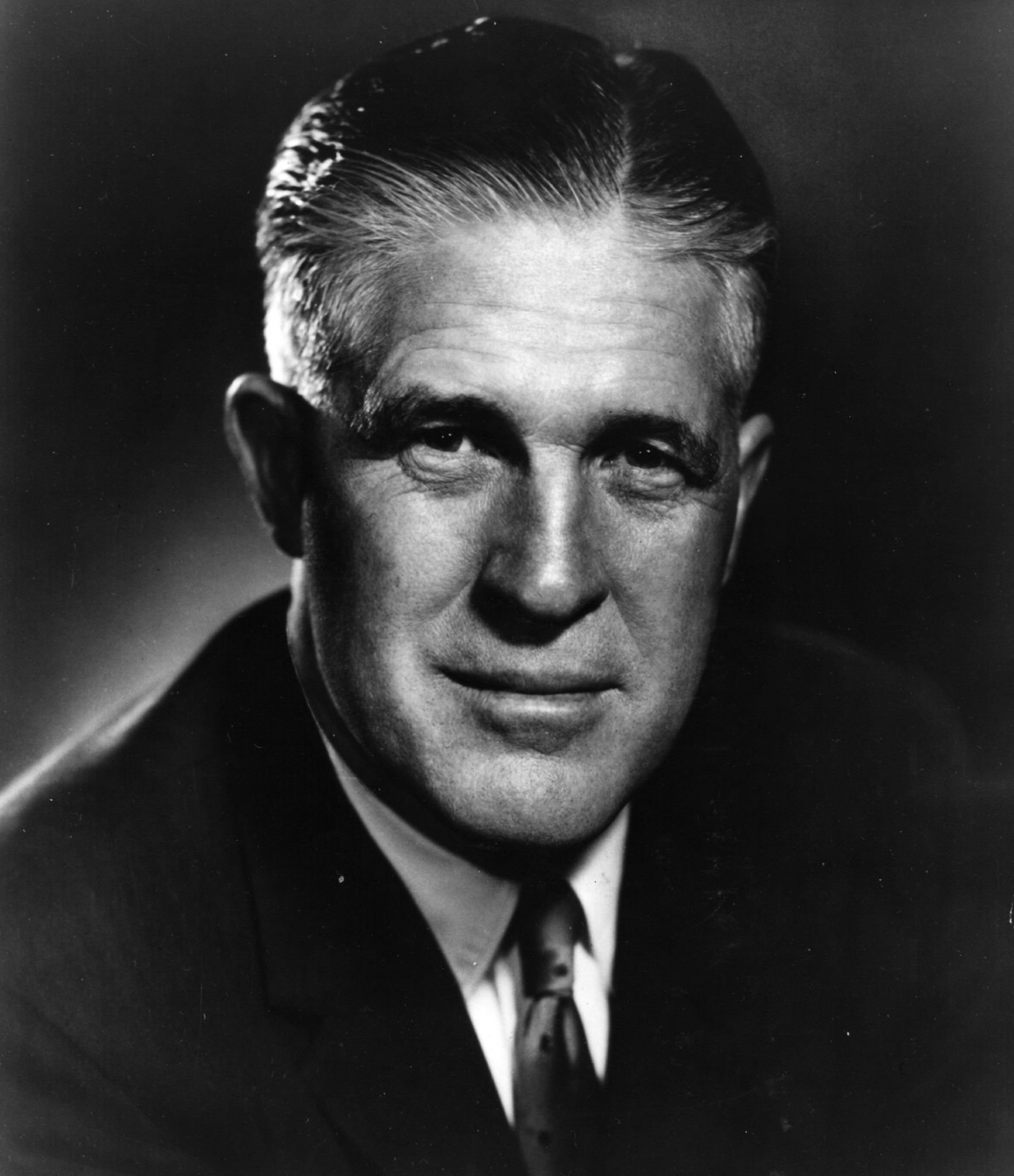

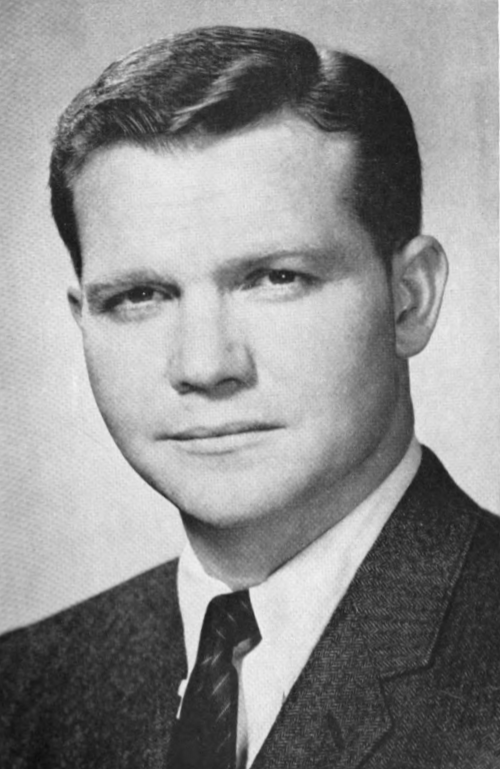
Nominee	George W. Romney	John B. Swainson
Party	Republican	Democratic
Popular vote	1,420,086	1,339,513
Percentage	51.36%	48.45%
- County results Romney: 50–60% 60–70% 70–80% Swainson: 50–60% 60–70%
Governor before election
John B. Swainson
Democratic
Elected Governor
George W. Romney
Republican

The 1962 Michigan gubernatorial election was held on November 6, 1962. Republican George W. Romney defeated incumbent Democrat John B. Swainson with 51.36% of the vote.

== Primary election ==
Michigan held primary elections on August 7, 1962.

=== Democratic party ===
Incumbent governor John B. Swainson was renominated without opposition.

==== Candidates ====
- John B. Swainson, incumbent governor

==== Results ====
Democratic primary results
Party	Candidate	Votes	%
Democratic	John B. Swainson (inc.)	318,580	99.99%
Democratic	Scattering	22	0.01%
Total votes		318,602	100.00%

=== Republican party ===
Businessman George W. Romney won the Republican nomination unopposed.

==== Candidates ====
- George W. Romney, former president of American Motors Corporation

==== Results ====
Republican primary results
Party	Candidate	Votes	%
Republican	George W. Romney	448,449	99.97%
Republican	Scattering	120	0.03%
Total votes		448,569	100.00%

== General election ==
=== Candidates ===
Major party candidates

- George W. Romney, Republican
- John B. Swainson, Democratic

Other candidates

- James Sim, Socialist Labor

== Campaign ==
=== Debates ===
1962 Michigan gubernatorial election debates and forums
No.	Date	Host	Moderator	Republican	Democratic
Key: P Participant A Absent N Not invited I Invited W Withdrawn					
Key: P Participant A Absent N Not invited I Invited W Withdrawn				Romney	Swainson
1	October 9, 1962	WWJ-TV	James Clark	P	P
2	October 17, 1962	WXYZ-TV	Richard Femmel	P	P
3	October 26, 1962	WJBK-TV	Carl Cederberg	P	P

=== Results ===
1962 Michigan gubernatorial election
Party	Candidate	Votes	%	±%
Republican	George W. Romney	1,420,086	51.36%	+2.16%
Democratic	John B. Swainson (inc.)	1,339,513	48.45%	−2.03%
Socialist Labor	James Sim	5,219	0.19%	+0.14%
	Scattering	21	0.00%	
Majority		80,573	2.91%	
Total votes		2,764,839	100.00%	
Republican gain from Democratic		Swing	+4.19%	

==== Results by county ====
Gogebic County voted Republican for the first time since 1932. Romney was the first Republican to be elected governor without carrying Lake County. Starting with this election, Alpena County, Iosco County, and Luce County would vote for the winning candidate in every subsequent gubernatorial election until 2018.

County	George W. Romney Republican		John B. Swainson Democratic		James Sim Socialist Labor		Margin		Total votes cast
County	#	%	#	%	#	%	#	%	Total votes cast
Alcona	1,607	65.59%	841	34.33%	2	0.08%	766	31.27%	2,450
Alger	1,580	44.17%	1,989	55.61%	8	0.22%	-409	-11.43%	3,577
Allegan	13,563	69.12%	6,027	30.72%	31	0.16%	7,536	38.41%	19,621
Alpena	5,635	56.97%	4,253	42.99%	4	0.04%	1,382	13.97%	9,892
Antrim	2,829	66.64%	1,411	33.24%	5	0.12%	1,418	33.40%	4,245
Arenac	1,963	56.93%	1,482	42.98%	3	0.09%	481	13.95%	3,448
Baraga	1,536	47.94%	1,661	51.84%	7	0.22%	-125	-3.90%	3,204
Barry	7,428	65.20%	3,943	34.61%	21	0.18%	3,485	30.59%	11,392
Bay	16,943	47.54%	18,658	52.35%	39	0.11%	-1,715	-4.81%	35,640
Benzie	2,041	64.16%	1,136	35.71%	4	0.13%	905	28.45%	3,181
Berrien	28,881	61.94%	17,640	37.83%	106	0.23%	11,241	24.11%	46,627
Branch	6,960	64.07%	3,884	35.75%	19	0.17%	3,076	28.32%	10,863
Calhoun	24,549	59.48%	16,650	40.34%	77	0.19%	7,899	19.14%	41,276
Cass	6,589	58.62%	4,624	41.14%	26	0.23%	1,965	17.48%	11,240 (Note: Includes 1 Scattering vote)
Charlevoix	3,335	61.77%	2,058	38.12%	6	0.11%	1,277	23.65%	5,399
Cheboygan	3,243	57.39%	2,407	42.59%	1	0.02%	836	14.79%	5,651
Chippewa	5,241	56.97%	3,933	42.75%	26	0.28%	1,308	14.22%	9,200
Clare	2,932	67.82%	1,389	32.13%	2	0.05%	1,543	35.69%	4,323
Clinton	8,008	64.50%	4,398	35.42%	10	0.08%	3,610	29.08%	12,416
Crawford	1,134	60.67%	735	39.33%	0	0.00%	399	21.35%	1,869
Delta	6,240	48.62%	6,583	51.29%	11	0.09%	-343	-2.67%	12,834
Dickinson	4,954	49.51%	5,035	50.31%	18	0.18%	-81	-0.81%	10,007
Eaton	11,261	64.26%	6,236	35.59%	27	0.15%	5,025	28.67%	17,524
Emmet	3,824	64.03%	2,141	35.85%	7	0.12%	1,683	28.18%	5,972
Genesee	59,674	48.03%	64,420	51.85%	160	0.13%	-4,746	-3.82%	124,254
Gladwin	2,667	63.91%	1,505	36.07%	1	0.02%	1,162	27.85%	4,173
Gogebic	5,422	53.90%	4,617	45.89%	21	0.21%	805	8.00%	10,060
Grand Traverse	7,403	64.63%	4,031	35.19%	20	0.17%	3,372	29.44%	11,454
Gratiot	7,407	70.04%	3,161	29.89%	7	0.07%	4,246	40.15%	10,575
Hillsdale	7,842	70.24%	3,306	29.61%	17	0.15%	4,536	40.63%	11,165
Houghton	6,468	50.28%	6,374	49.55%	23	0.18%	94	0.73%	12,865
Huron	7,852	63.88%	4,415	35.92%	24	0.20%	3,437	27.96%	12,291
Ingham	44,174	61.19%	27,892	38.64%	123	0.17%	16,282	22.55%	72,189
Ionia	8,222	58.72%	5,756	41.11%	23	0.16%	2,466	17.61%	14,001
Iosco	3,371	61.53%	2,105	38.42%	3	0.05%	1,266	23.11%	5,479
Iron	3,890	48.50%	4,124	51.42%	7	0.09%	-234	-2.92%	8,021
Isabella	6,136	63.43%	3,535	36.54%	3	0.03%	2,601	26.89%	9,674
Jackson	26,555	60.43%	17,283	39.33%	106	0.24%	9,272	21.10%	43,944
Kalamazoo	33,650	64.15%	18,634	35.52%	168	0.32%	15,016	28.63%	52,456 (Note: Includes 4 Scattering votes)
Kalkaska	1,080	58.79%	754	41.05%	3	0.16%	326	17.75%	1,837
Kent	79,544	61.29%	50,054	38.57%	191	0.15%	29,490	22.72%	129,789
Keweenaw	590	50.04%	587	49.79%	2	0.17%	3	0.25%	1,179
Lake	1,218	49.03%	1,264	50.89%	2	0.08%	-46	-1.85%	2,484
Lapeer	8,071	63.86%	4,559	36.07%	8	0.06%	3,512	27.79%	12,638
Leelanau	2,486	65.42%	1,310	34.47%	4	0.11%	1,176	30.95%	3,800
Lenawee	16,175	65.15%	8,593	34.61%	59	0.24%	7,582	30.54%	24,827
Livingston	8,999	64.36%	4,960	35.47%	24	0.17%	4,039	28.89%	13,893
Luce	1,192	60.91%	763	38.99%	2	0.10%	429	21.92%	1,957
Mackinac	2,595	59.30%	1,775	40.56%	6	0.14%	820	18.74%	4,376
Macomb	65,226	45.49%	77,831	54.29%	310	0.22%	-12,605	-8.79%	143,370 (Note: Includes 3 Scattering votes)
Manistee	4,123	53.80%	3,534	46.12%	6	0.08%	589	7.69%	7,663
Marquette	8,419	47.79%	9,169	52.05%	27	0.15%	-750	-4.26%	17,615
Mason	4,965	56.77%	3,777	43.19%	4	0.05%	1,188	13.58%	8,746
Mecosta	4,120	66.08%	2,111	33.86%	4	0.06%	2,009	32.22%	6,235
Menominee	4,732	52.51%	4,271	47.40%	8	0.09%	461	5.12%	9,011
Midland	12,203	66.92%	6,018	33.00%	14	0.08%	6,185	33.92%	18,235
Missaukee	2,123	75.85%	674	24.08%	2	0.07%	1,449	51.77%	2,799
Monroe	15,997	51.61%	14,933	48.18%	64	0.21%	1,064	3.43%	30,994
Montcalm	8,086	64.87%	4,368	35.04%	11	0.09%	3,718	29.83%	12,465
Montmorency	1,214	61.13%	767	38.62%	5	0.25%	447	22.51%	1,986
Muskegon	27,777	52.44%	25,100	47.39%	93	0.18%	2,677	5.05%	52,970
Newaygo	6,074	67.36%	2,933	32.53%	10	0.11%	3,141	34.83%	9,017
Oakland	155,219	60.24%	101,969	39.57%	485	0.19%	53,250	20.66%	257,684 (Note: Includes 11 Scattering votes)
Oceana	3,703	61.75%	2,283	38.07%	11	0.18%	1,420	23.68%	5,997
Ogemaw	2,450	56.08%	1,917	43.88%	2	0.05%	533	12.20%	4,369
Ontonagon	2,402	53.21%	2,109	46.72%	3	0.07%	293	6.49%	4,514
Osceola	3,659	71.63%	1,444	28.27%	5	0.10%	2,215	43.36%	5,108
Oscoda	1,024	71.51%	406	28.35%	2	0.14%	618	43.16%	1,432
Otsego	1,634	58.09%	1,179	41.91%	0	0.00%	455	16.17%	2,813
Ottawa	27,406	72.64%	10,273	27.23%	47	0.12%	17,133	45.41%	37,726
Presque Isle	2,621	53.00%	2,318	46.88%	6	0.12%	303	6.13%	4,945
Roscommon	2,221	64.85%	1,195	34.89%	9	0.26%	1,026	29.96%	3,425
Saginaw	34,028	54.38%	28,447	45.46%	101	0.16%	5,581	8.92%	62,576
Sanilac	9,185	71.74%	3,612	28.21%	6	0.05%	5,573	43.53%	12,803
Schoolcraft	1,967	54.10%	1,667	45.85%	2	0.06%	300	8.25%	3,636
Shiawassee	10,589	58.75%	7,385	40.97%	50	0.28%	3,204	17.78%	18,024
St. Clair	21,979	58.31%	15,660	41.55%	52	0.14%	6,319	16.77%	37,691
St. Joseph	9,089	67.82%	4,289	32.01%	21	0.16%	4,800	35.82%	13,401 (Note: Includes 2 Scattering votes)
Tuscola	9,289	65.32%	4,928	34.65%	4	0.03%	4,361	30.67%	14,221
Van Buren	10,011	63.13%	5,806	36.61%	41	0.26%	4,205	26.52%	15,858
Washtenaw	34,759	62.66%	20,603	37.14%	106	0.19%	14,156	25.52%	55,468
Wayne	382,412	38.87%	599,094	60.90%	2,237	0.23%	-216,682	-22.03%	983,743
Wexford	4,421	63.37%	2,552	36.58%	4	0.06%	1,869	26.79%	6,977
Total	1,420,086	51.36%	1,339,513	48.45%	5,219	0.19%	80,573	2.91%	2,764,839

===== Counties that flipped from Democratic to Republican =====
- Gogebic
- Houghton
- Keweenaw
- Menominee
- Monroe
- Ontonagon
- Schoolcraft

===== Counties that flipped from Republican to Democratic =====
- Genesee
- Lake
