= 1958 Michigan gubernatorial election =

- November 4, 1958
- Turnout: 36.29%
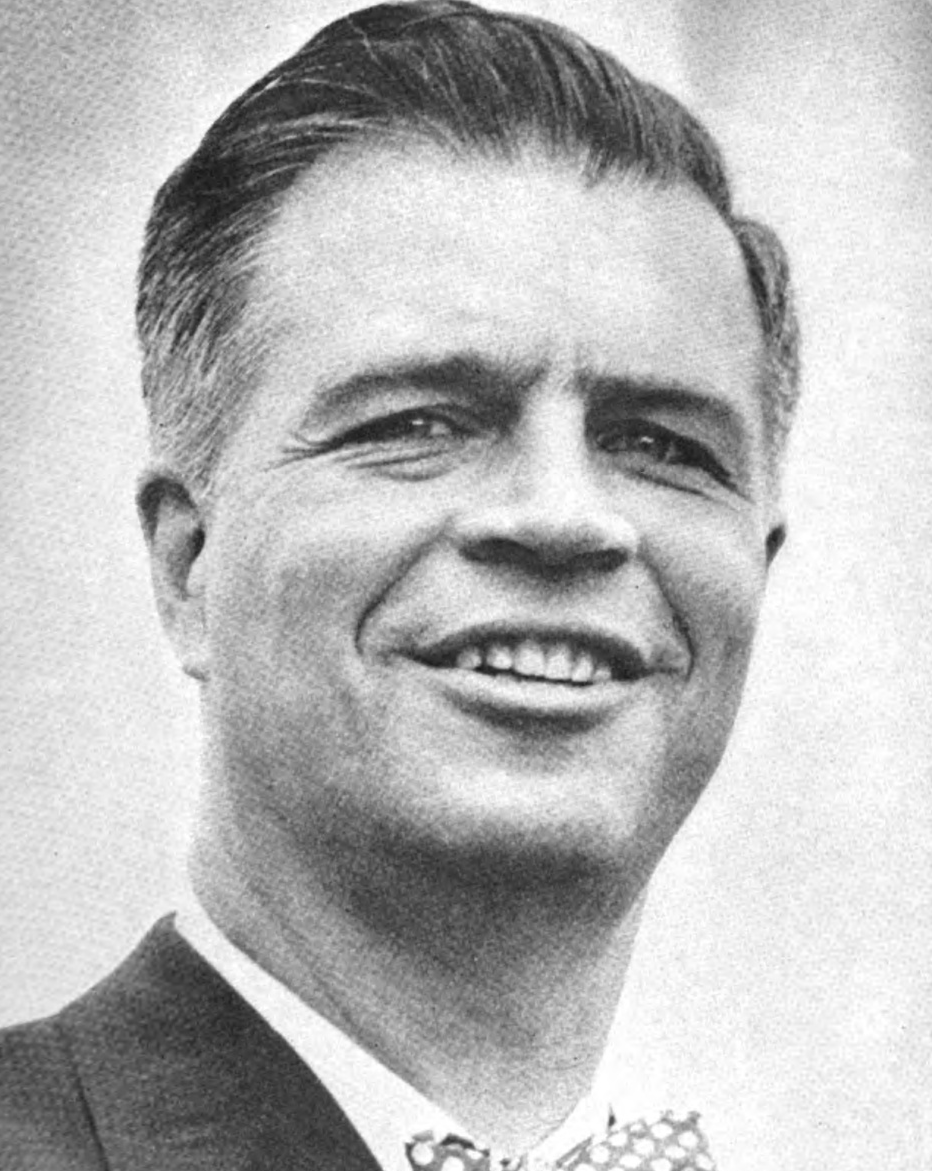

| Nominee | G. Mennen Williams | Paul D. Bagwell |
| Party | Democratic | Republican |
| Popular vote | 1,225,533 | 1,078,089 |
| Percentage | 53.00% | 46.63% |
- County results Williams: 50–60% 60–70% Bagwell: 50–60% 60–70% 70–80%
Governor before election
G. Mennen Williams
Democratic
Elected Governor
G. Mennen Williams
Democratic

The 1958 Michigan gubernatorial election was held on November 4, 1958. Incumbent Democrat G. Mennen Williams defeated Republican nominee Paul D. Bagwell with 53% of the vote.

== Primary election ==
Michigan held primary elections on August 5, 1958.

=== Democratic party ===
Incumbent governor G. Mennen Williams was renominated for a sixth consecutive term. This was the first time more votes were cast in the Democratic primary than in the Republican primary.

==== Candidates ====
- William L. Johnson, Democratic nominee for Michigan State Treasurer in 1952
- G. Mennen Williams, incumbent governor

==== Results ====
Democratic primary results
| Party | Candidate | Votes | % |
|---|---|---|---|
| Democratic | G. Mennen Williams (inc.) | 385,864 | 84.47% |
| Democratic | William L. Johnson | 65,614 | 14.53% |
| Democratic | Scattering | 2 | 0.00% |
| Total votes | | 451,480 | 100.00% |

=== Republican party ===
Paul D. Bagwell won the Republican nomination without opposition.

==== Candidates ====
- Paul D. Bagwell, professor at Michigan State University and Republican nominee for Auditor General in 1956.

==== Results ====
Republican primary results
| Party | Candidate | Votes | % |
|---|---|---|---|
| Republican | Paul D. Bagwell | 260,494 | 99.99% |
| Republican | Scattering | 25 | 0.01% |
| Total votes | | 260,519 | 100.00% |

== General election ==
=== Candidates ===
Major party candidates

- G. Mennen Williams, Democratic
- Paul Douglas Bagwell, Republican

Other candidates

- Ralph Muncy, Socialist Labor
- Rollin M. Severance, Prohibition
- Frank Lovell, Socialist Workers

=== Results ===
1958 Michigan gubernatorial election
| Party | Candidate | Votes | % | ±% |
|---|---|---|---|---|
| Democratic | G. Mennen Williams (inc.) | 1,225,533 | 53.00% | −1.65% |
| Republican | Paul D. Bagwell | 1,078,089 | 46.63% | +1.49% |
| Socialist Labor | Ralph Muncy | 3,983 | 0.17% | |
| Prohibition | Rollin M. Severance | 3,622 | 0.16% | −0.06% |
| Socialist Workers | Frank Lovell | 957 | 0.04% | |
| Majority | | 147,444 | 6.38% | |
| Total votes | | 2,312,184 | 100.00% | |
| Democratic hold | | Swing | -3.14% | |

==== Results by county ====
| County | G. Mennen Williams Democratic | | Paul D. Bagwell Republican | | All Others Various | | Margin | | Total votes cast |
| County | # | % | # | % | # | % | # | % | Total votes cast |
|---|---|---|---|---|---|---|---|---|---|
| Alcona | 842 | 36.22% | 1,478 | 63.57% | 5 | 0.22% | -636 | -27.35% | 2,325 |
| Alger | 2,059 | 62.66% | 1,243 | 36.91% | 14 | 0.43% | 846 | 25.75% | 3,286 |
| Allegan | 5,059 | 31.74% | 10,837 | 67.99% | 42 | 0.26% | -5,778 | -36.25% | 15,938 |
| Alpena | 3,194 | 40.09% | 4,766 | 59.82% | 7 | 0.09% | -1,572 | -19.73% | 7,967 |
| Antrim | 1,452 | 35.38% | 2,642 | 64.38% | 10 | 0.24% | -1,190 | -29.00% | 4,104 |
| Arenac | 1,522 | 45.10% | 1,844 | 54.64% | 9 | 0.27% | -322 | -9.54% | 3,375 |
| Baraga | 1,835 | 55.56% | 1,464 | 44.32% | 4 | 0.12% | 371 | 11.23% | 3,303 |
| Barry | 3,764 | 37.36% | 6,265 | 62.19% | 45 | 0.45% | -2,501 | -24.83% | 10,074 |
| Bay | 15,759 | 52.35% | 14,266 | 47.39% | 79 | 0.26% | 1,493 | 4.96% | 30,104 |
| Benzie | 1,218 | 40.41% | 1,784 | 59.19% | 12 | 0.40% | -566 | -18.78% | 3,014 |
| Berrien | 17,851 | 44.42% | 22,140 | 55.09% | 195 | 0.49% | -4,289 | -10.67% | 40,186 |
| Branch | 3,716 | 39.10% | 5,728 | 60.27% | 60 | 0.63% | -2,012 | -21.17% | 9,504 |
| Calhoun | 16,826 | 45.70% | 19,821 | 53.84% | 168 | 0.46% | -2,995 | -8.14% | 36,815 |
| Cass | 4,772 | 46.68% | 5,394 | 52.77% | 56 | 0.55% | -622 | -6.08% | 10,222 |
| Charlevoix | 2,376 | 43.98% | 2,999 | 55.51% | 28 | 0.52% | -623 | -11.53% | 5,403 |
| Cheboygan | 2,578 | 46.43% | 2,964 | 53.39% | 10 | 0.18% | -386 | -6.95% | 5,552 |
| Chippewa | 4,634 | 52.24% | 4,217 | 47.54% | 19 | 0.21% | 417 | 4.70% | 8,870 |
| Clare | 1,245 | 32.20% | 2,603 | 67.33% | 18 | 0.47% | -1,358 | -35.13% | 3,866 |
| Clinton | 3,966 | 34.76% | 7,424 | 65.06% | 21 | 0.18% | -3,458 | -30.30% | 11,411 |
| Crawford | 759 | 43.62% | 977 | 56.15% | 4 | 0.23% | -218 | -12.53% | 1,740 |
| Delta | 6,497 | 57.95% | 4,683 | 41.77% | 31 | 0.28% | 1,814 | 16.18% | 11,211 |
| Dickinson | 5,523 | 58.32% | 3,934 | 41.54% | 13 | 0.14% | 1,589 | 16.78% | 9,470 |
| Eaton | 6,440 | 40.45% | 9,401 | 59.05% | 79 | 0.50% | -2,691 | -18.60% | 15,950 |
| Emmet | 2,209 | 40.11% | 3,282 | 59.59% | 17 | 0.31% | -1,073 | -19.48% | 5,508 |
| Genesee | 53,339 | 51.49% | 49,812 | 48.08% | 449 | 0.43% | 3,527 | 3.40% | 103,600 |
| Gladwin | 1,364 | 37.43% | 2,271 | 62.32% | 9 | 0.25% | -907 | -24.89% | 3,644 |
| Gogebic | 6,237 | 55.97% | 4,847 | 43.50% | 59 | 0.53% | 1,390 | 12.47% | 11,143 |
| Grand Traverse | 3,704 | 37.47% | 6,160 | 62.31% | 22 | 0.22% | -2,456 | -24.84% | 9,886 |
| Gratiot | 3,174 | 32.28% | 6,624 | 67.36% | 36 | 0.37% | -3,450 | -35.08% | 9,834 |
| Hillsdale | 3,321 | 32.18% | 6,896 | 66.82% | 103 | 1.00% | -3,575 | -34.64% | 10,320 |
| Houghton | 7,596 | 56.67% | 5,773 | 43.07% | 35 | 0.26% | 1,823 | 13.60% | 13,404 |
| Huron | 3,740 | 31.12% | 8,246 | 68.62% | 31 | 0.26% | -4,506 | -37.50% | 12,017 |
| Ingham | 27,915 | 43.26% | 36,441 | 56.48% | 167 | 0.26% | -8,529 | -13.22% | 64,520 |
| Ionia | 5,197 | 41.06% | 7,405 | 58.51% | 55 | 0.43% | -2,208 | -17.44% | 12,657 |
| Iosco | 1,803 | 38.95% | 2,821 | 60.94% | 5 | 0.11% | -1,018 | -21.99% | 4,629 |
| Iron | 5,128 | 60.69% | 3,302 | 39.08% | 20 | 0.24% | 1,826 | 21.61% | 8,450 |
| Isabella | 3,437 | 38.14% | 5,551 | 61.60% | 24 | 0.27% | -2,114 | -23.46% | 9,012 |
| Jackson | 15,727 | 40.19% | 23,261 | 59.45% | 140 | 0.36% | -7,534 | -19.25% | 39,128 |
| Kalamazoo | 16,004 | 37.20% | 26,763 | 62.22% | 249 | 0.58% | -10,759 | -25.01% | 43,016 |
| Kalkaska | 751 | 42.03% | 1,029 | 57.58% | 7 | 0.39% | -278 | -15.56% | 1,787 |
| Kent | 45,096 | 41.32% | 63,637 | 58.31% | 405 | 0.37% | -18,541 | -16.99% | 109,138 |
| Keweenaw | 759 | 60.53% | 494 | 39.39% | 1 | 0.08% | 265 | 21.13% | 1,254 |
| Lake | 1,235 | 51.87% | 1,140 | 47.88% | 6 | 0.25% | 95 | 3.99% | 2,381 |
| Lapeer | 4,300 | 37.29% | 7,198 | 62.42% | 33 | 0.29% | -2,898 | -25.13% | 11,531 |
| Leelanau | 1,547 | 40.41% | 2,278 | 59.51% | 3 | 0.08% | -731 | -19.10% | 3,828 |
| Lenawee | 7,317 | 34.54% | 13,780 | 65.05% | 86 | 0.41% | -6,463 | -30.51% | 21,183 |
| Livingston | 4,034 | 35.01% | 7,439 | 64.57% | 48 | 0.42% | -3,405 | -29.55% | 11,521 |
| Luce | 949 | 44.39% | 1,188 | 55.57% | 1 | 0.05% | -239 | -11.18% | 2,138 |
| Mackinac | 1,920 | 46.49% | 2,201 | 53.29% | 9 | 0.22% | -281 | -6.80% | 4,130 |
| Macomb | 61,601 | 64.17% | 34,095 | 35.52% | 304 | 0.32% | 27,506 | 28.65% | 96,000 |
| Manistee | 3,435 | 47.90% | 3,721 | 51.89% | 15 | 0.21% | -286 | -3.99% | 7,171 |
| Marquette | 10,502 | 57.85% | 7,603 | 41.88% | 48 | 0.26% | 2,899 | 15.97% | 18,153 |
| Mason | 3,764 | 45.11% | 4,562 | 54.67% | 18 | 0.22% | -798 | -9.56% | 8,344 |
| Mecosta | 2,321 | 38.72% | 3,648 | 60.85% | 26 | 0.43% | -1,327 | -22.14% | 5,995 |
| Menominee | 4,862 | 54.23% | 4,085 | 45.57% | 18 | 0.20% | 777 | 8.67% | 8,965 |
| Midland | 5,126 | 35.16% | 9,417 | 64.60% | 34 | 0.23% | -4,291 | -29.44% | 14,577 |
| Missaukee | 802 | 28.99% | 1,948 | 70.43% | 16 | 0.58% | -1,146 | -41.43% | 2,766 |
| Monroe | 13,389 | 53.81% | 11,407 | 45.84% | 86 | 0.35% | 1,982 | 7.97% | 24,882 |
| Montcalm | 4,290 | 38.78% | 6,728 | 60.82% | 45 | 0.41% | -2,438 | -22.04% | 11,063 |
| Montmorency | 817 | 40.35% | 1,205 | 59.51% | 3 | 0.15% | -388 | -19.16% | 2,025 |
| Muskegon | 24,307 | 54.21% | 20,372 | 45.43% | 160 | 0.36% | 3,935 | 8.78% | 44,839 |
| Newaygo | 3,003 | 36.73% | 5,147 | 62.96% | 25 | 0.31% | -2,144 | -26.23% | 8,175 |
| Oakland | 93,621 | 47.92% | 101,104 | 51.75% | 633 | 0.32% | -7,483 | -3.83% | 195,358 |
| Oceana | 2,360 | 43.57% | 3,038 | 56.09% | 18 | 0.33% | -678 | -12.52% | 5,416 |
| Ogemaw | 1,319 | 40.46% | 1,932 | 59.26% | 9 | 0.28% | -613 | -18.80% | 3,260 |
| Ontonagon | 2,406 | 54.13% | 2,037 | 45.83% | 2 | 0.04% | 369 | 8.30% | 4,445 |
| Osceola | 1,250 | 28.56% | 3,105 | 70.96% | 21 | 0.48% | -1,855 | -42.39% | 4,376 |
| Oscoda | 458 | 35.89% | 816 | 63.95% | 2 | 0.16% | -358 | -28.06% | 1,276 |
| Otsego | 1,263 | 45.71% | 1,497 | 54.18% | 3 | 0.11% | -234 | -8.47% | 2,763 |
| Ottawa | 9,983 | 31.83% | 21,265 | 67.81% | 111 | 0.35% | -11,282 | -35.98% | 31,359 |
| Presque Isle | 2,069 | 48.80% | 2,166 | 51.08% | 5 | 0.12% | -97 | -2.29% | 4,240 |
| Roscommon | 900 | 33.14% | 1,812 | 66.72% | 4 | 0.15% | -912 | -33.58% | 2,716 |
| Saginaw | 23,787 | 45.09% | 28,558 | 54.14% | 406 | 0.77% | -4,771 | -9.04% | 52,751 |
| Sanilac | 3,148 | 27.99% | 8,075 | 71.80% | 24 | 0.21% | -4,927 | -43.81% | 11,247 |
| Schoolcraft | 2,028 | 53.33% | 1,768 | 46.49% | 7 | 0.18% | 260 | 6.84% | 3,803 |
| Shiawassee | 6,958 | 42.33% | 9,403 | 57.21% | 76 | 0.46% | -2,445 | -14.87% | 16,437 |
| St. Clair | 13,046 | 40.14% | 19,355 | 59.55% | 103 | 0.32% | -6,309 | -19.41% | 32,504 |
| St. Joseph | 4,045 | 33.94% | 7,803 | 65.47% | 71 | 0.60% | -3,758 | -31.53% | 11,919 |
| Tuscola | 3,998 | 31.94% | 8,460 | 67.58% | 60 | 0.48% | -4,462 | -35.64% | 12,518 |
| Van Buren | 5,253 | 38.36% | 8,349 | 60.97% | 91 | 0.66% | -3,096 | -22.61% | 13,693 |
| Washtenaw | 17,818 | 41.51% | 24,953 | 58.14% | 149 | 0.35% | -7,135 | -16.62% | 42,920 |
| Wayne | 547,044 | 67.02% | 266,233 | 32.62% | 2,978 | 0.36% | 280,811 | 34.40% | 816,255 |
| Wexford | 2,873 | 43.18% | 3,739 | 56.19% | 42 | 0.63% | -866 | -13.01% | 6,654 |
| Total | 1,225,533 | 53.00% | 1,078,089 | 46.63% | 8,562 | 0.37% | 147,444 | 6.38% | 2,312,184 |

===== Counties that flipped from Republican to Democratic =====
- Chippewa

===== Counties that flipped from Democratic to Republican =====
- Calhoun
- Presque Isle
