= Eugene C. Keyes =

American politician (1900–1963)

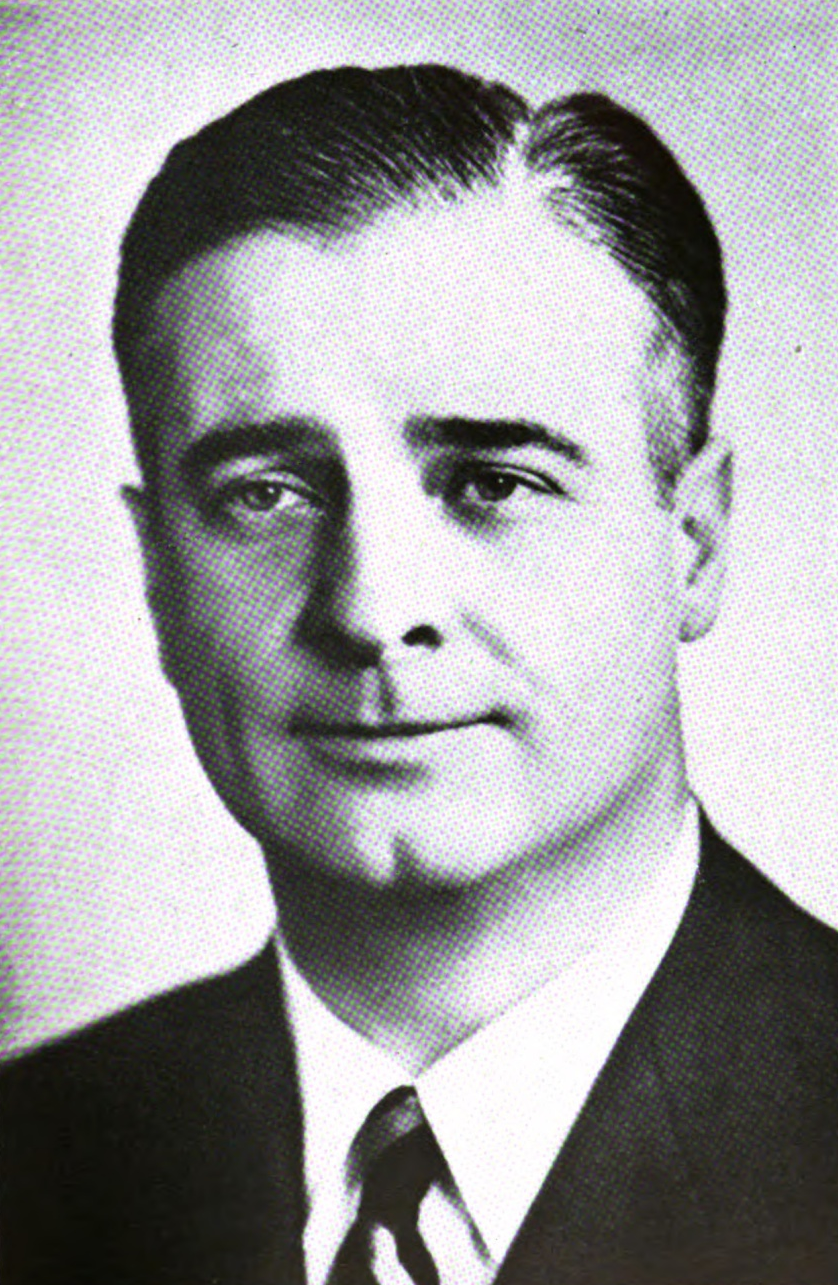
Eugene C. Keyes.png c. 1949

Eugene C. Keyes (August 23, 1900 – May 2, 1963) was the 45th and 47th lieutenant governor of Michigan from 1943 to 1945 and 1947 to 1949.

== Early life and education ==
Born in Dearborn, Michigan, Keyes studied as a doctor and lawyer, receiving several degrees. In 1921, the Royal College of Dental Surgeons awarded him a Doctor of Dental Surgery, followed by a Doctor of Medicine degree from Wayne State University in 1930. In 1932, he founded the Keyes Diagnostic Clinic in Dearborn. In 1935, Keyes earned a law degree from the Detroit College of Law.

== Political career ==
Before serving as lieutenant governor, Keyes was a county supervisor and city councilman in his home city. He was affiliated with the Republican Party. Keyes served as lieutenant governor under two governors, Harry Kelly from 1943 to 1945 and Kim Sigler from 1947 to 1949, both of whom were also Republicans.

In 1965, two years after Keyes death, the clinic he founded was demolished to make way for parking lots.

Party political offices
Preceded by Vernon J. Brown	Republican nominee for Lieutenant Governor of Michigan; 1946, 1948	Succeeded by William C. Vandenberg
Political offices
Preceded by Frank Murphy	Lieutenant Governor of Michigan; 1943–1945	Succeeded by Vernon J. Brown
Preceded by Vernon J. Brown	Lieutenant Governor of Michigan; 1947–1949	Succeeded by John W. Connolly
