= Bonisteel =

Bonisteel is a surname. Notable people with the surname include:

- Roscoe Bonisteel (1888–1972), American lawyer
- Roy Bonisteel (1930–2013), Canadian journalist

== See also ==
- Bonesteel (disambiguation)
