= 1946 Michigan gubernatorial election =

- November 5, 1946
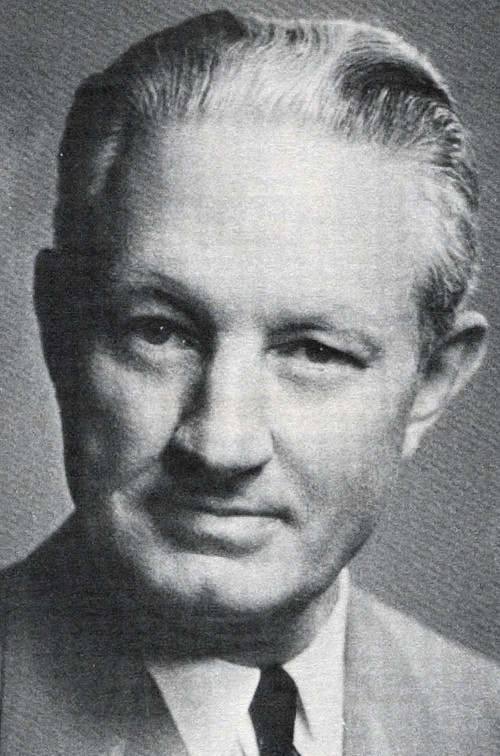

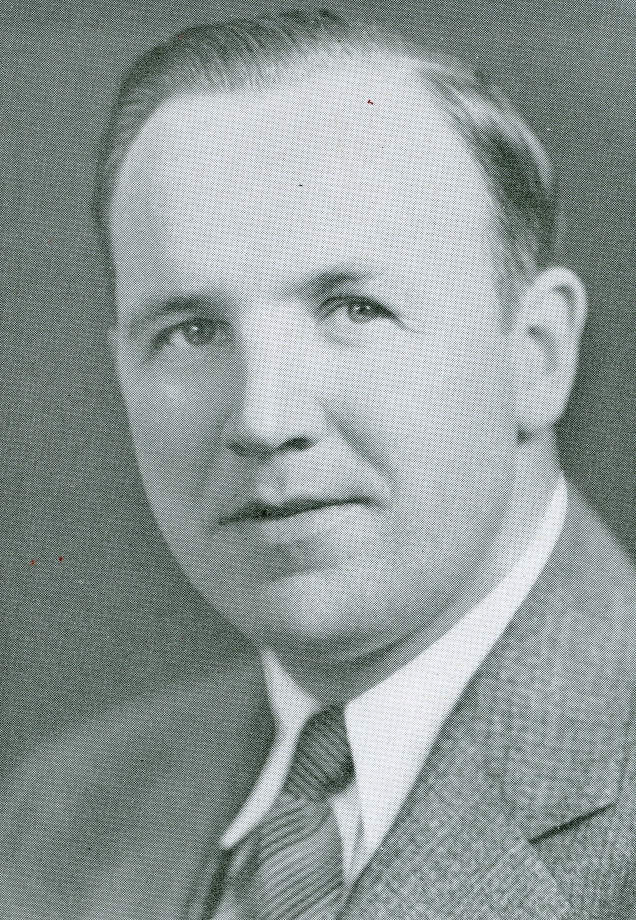
Nominee	Kim Sigler	Murray Van Wagoner
Party	Republican	Democratic
Popular vote	1,003,878	644,540
Percentage	60.28%	38.70%
- County results Sigler: 50–60% 60–70% 70–80% 80–90% Van Wagoner: 50–60%
Governor before election
Harry Kelly
Republican
Elected Governor
Kim Sigler
Republican

The 1946 Michigan gubernatorial election was held on November 5, 1946. Republican nominee Kim Sigler defeated Democratic nominee Murray Van Wagoner with 60.28% of the vote.

This was one of only two gubernatorial elections since 1928 in which Wayne County voted Republican. (Note: The other was instance was in 1978.)

== Primary election ==
Michigan held primary elections on June 18, 1946.

=== Republican party ===
Kim Sigler won the Republican nomination from a crowded field.

==== Candidates ====
- Vernon J. Brown, Lieutenant Governor of Michigan
- Edward Jeffries, mayor of Detroit
- Raymond J. Kelly, attorney from Detroit
- Kim Sigler, attorney from Battle Creek

==== Results ====
Republican primary results
Party	Candidate	Votes	%
Republican	Kim Sigler	170,779	37.82%
Republican	Vernon J. Brown	123,029	27.25%
Republican	Raymond J. Kelly	92,770	20.55%
Republican	Edward Jeffries	64,936	14.38%
Republican	Scattering	14	0.00%
Total votes		451,528	100.00%

=== Democratic party ===
Former governor Murray Van Wagoner easily secured the Democratic nomination.

==== Candidates ====
- William J. Cody, candidate for Democratic nomination in 1944
- Murray Van Wagoner, former governor

==== Results ====
Democratic primary results
Party	Candidate	Votes	%
Democratic	Murray Van Wagoner	98,103	72.63%
Democratic	William J. Cody	36,965	27.37%
Democratic	Scattering	7	0.01%
Total votes		135,075	100.00%

== General election ==
=== Candidates ===
Major party candidates

- Kim Sigler, Republican
- Murray Van Wagoner, Democratic

Other candidates

- Gordon Phillips, Prohibition
- James Sim, Socialist Labor

=== Results ===
1946 Michigan gubernatorial election
Party	Candidate	Votes	%	±%
Republican	Kim Sigler	1,003,878	60.28%	+5.58%
Democratic	Murray Van Wagoner	644,540	38.70%	−6.06%
Prohibition	Gordon Phillips	11,974	0.72%	+0.46%
Socialist Labor	James Sim	5,071	0.30%	+0.30%
	Scattering	12	0.00%	
Majority		359,338	21.58%	
Total votes		1,665,475	100.00%	
Republican hold		Swing	+11.64%	

==== Results by county ====
County	Kim Sigler Republican		Murray Van Wagoner Democratic		Gordon Phillips Prohibition		James Sim Socialist Labor		Margin		Total votes cast
County	#	%	#	%	#	%	#	%	#	%	Total votes cast
Alcona	1,618	70.93%	651	28.54%	12	0.53%	0	0.00%	967	42.39%	2,281
Alger	1,678	45.87%	1,976	54.02%	4	0.11%	0	0.00%	-298	-8.15%	3,658
Allegan	9,840	73.55%	3,406	25.46%	119	0.89%	14	0.10%	6,434	48.09%	13,379
Alpena	3,977	67.46%	1,910	32.40%	7	0.12%	1	0.02%	2,067	35.06%	5,895
Antrim	2,179	70.77%	863	28.03%	32	1.04%	5	0.16%	1,316	42.74%	3,079
Arenac	1,930	65.87%	983	33.55%	11	0.38%	6	0.20%	947	32.32%	2,930
Baraga	2,081	55.27%	1,675	44.49%	6	0.16%	3	0.08%	406	10.78%	3,765
Barry	5,951	75.42%	1,668	21.14%	264	3.35%	7	0.09%	4,283	54.28%	7,890
Bay	12,185	58.32%	8,550	40.92%	95	0.45%	65	0.31%	3,635	17.40%	20,895
Benzie	1,777	71.80%	650	26.26%	35	1.41%	12	0.48%	1,127	45.54%	2,475 (Note: Includes 1 Scattering vote)
Berrien	19,883	68.55%	8,872	30.59%	183	0.63%	65	0.22%	11,011	37.97%	29,003
Branch	6,135	71.33%	2,330	27.09%	132	1.53%	4	0.05%	3,805	44.24%	8,601
Calhoun	19,605	70.84%	7,853	28.38%	158	0.57%	59	0.21%	11,752	42.46%	27,675
Cass	5,833	67.33%	2,767	31.94%	50	0.58%	13	0.15%	3,066	35.39%	8,663
Charlevoix	2,559	68.46%	1,130	30.23%	45	1.20%	4	0.11%	1,429	38.23%	3,738
Cheboygan	2,459	62.06%	1,486	37.51%	12	0.30%	5	0.13%	973	24.56%	3,962
Chippewa	4,630	62.37%	2,723	36.68%	61	0.82%	9	0.12%	1,907	25.69%	7,423
Clare	2,269	79.22%	572	19.97%	20	0.70%	3	0.10%	1,697	59.25%	2,864
Clinton	6,424	71.04%	2,535	28.03%	76	0.84%	8	0.09%	3,889	43.01%	9,043
Crawford	819	65.21%	428	34.08%	1	0.08%	8	0.64%	391	31.13%	1,256
Delta	4,402	43.39%	5,681	55.99%	50	0.49%	13	0.13%	-1,279	-12.61%	10,146
Dickinson	5,111	46.90%	5,680	52.12%	88	0.81%	18	0.17%	-569	-5.22%	10,897
Eaton	8,291	68.63%	3,533	29.25%	238	1.97%	18	0.15%	4,758	39.39%	12,080
Emmet	2,936	65.56%	1,510	33.72%	27	0.60%	5	0.11%	1,426	31.84%	4,478
Genesee	35,808	54.09%	29,634	44.77%	501	0.76%	255	0.39%	6,174	9.33%	66,198
Gladwin	1,844	72.68%	670	26.41%	23	0.91%	0	0.00%	1,174	46.28%	2,537
Gogebic	5,531	45.87%	6,446	53.46%	73	0.61%	8	0.07%	-915	-7.59%	12,058
Grand Traverse	4,244	72.60%	1,554	26.58%	38	0.65%	10	0.17%	2,690	46.01%	5,846
Gratiot	6,085	73.99%	1,973	23.99%	162	1.97%	4	0.05%	4,112	50.00%	8,224
Hillsdale	6,820	73.12%	2,299	24.65%	198	2.12%	9	0.10%	4,521	48.47%	9,327
Houghton	9,069	53.96%	7,695	45.78%	40	0.24%	3	0.02%	1,374	8.18%	16,807
Huron	7,264	80.59%	1,643	18.23%	100	1.11%	7	0.08%	5,621	62.36%	9,014
Ingham	28,118	58.86%	18,919	39.61%	612	1.28%	110	0.23%	9,199	19.26%	47,767 (Note: Includes 8 Scattering votes)
Ionia	7,760	68.81%	3,272	29.01%	232	2.06%	13	0.12%	4,488	39.80%	11,277
Iosco	2,260	71.63%	881	27.92%	11	0.35%	3	0.10%	1,379	43.71%	3,155
Iron	3,861	50.06%	3,781	49.03%	56	0.73%	14	0.18%	80	1.04%	7,712
Isabella	5,204	76.20%	1,538	22.52%	83	1.22%	4	0.06%	3,666	53.68%	6,829
Jackson	19,734	70.23%	8,058	28.68%	256	0.91%	52	0.19%	11,676	41.55%	28,101
Kalamazoo	20,688	66.52%	9,891	31.80%	430	1.38%	91	0.29%	10,797	34.72%	31,100
Kalkaska	798	70.18%	306	26.91%	32	2.81%	1	0.09%	492	43.27%	1,137
Kent	45,544	64.40%	24,415	34.52%	652	0.92%	112	0.16%	21,129	29.88%	70,723
Keweenaw	856	52.74%	764	47.07%	1	0.06%	2	0.12%	92	5.67%	1,623
Lake	1,121	65.75%	577	33.84%	6	0.35%	1	0.06%	544	31.91%	1,705
Lapeer	6,391	75.29%	1,998	23.54%	93	1.10%	7	0.08%	4,393	51.75%	8,489
Leelanau	1,777	71.65%	694	27.98%	7	0.28%	2	0.08%	1,083	43.67%	2,480
Lenawee	13,788	73.85%	4,630	24.80%	240	1.29%	12	0.06%	9,158	49.05%	18,670
Livingston	6,341	71.45%	2,438	27.47%	92	1.04%	4	0.05%	3,903	43.98%	8,875
Luce	1,065	73.45%	375	25.86%	10	0.69%	0	0.00%	690	47.59%	1,450
Mackinac	1,874	65.09%	993	34.49%	11	0.38%	1	0.03%	881	30.60%	2,879
Macomb	19,387	58.81%	13,199	40.04%	216	0.66%	162	0.49%	6,188	18.77%	32,964
Manistee	3,931	58.47%	2,749	40.89%	34	0.51%	9	0.13%	1,182	17.58%	6,723
Marquette	9,202	52.67%	8,200	46.93%	58	0.33%	11	0.06%	1,002	5.74%	17,471
Mason	4,053	65.50%	2,061	33.31%	56	0.90%	18	0.29%	1,992	32.19%	6,188
Mecosta	3,385	74.64%	1,081	23.84%	66	1.46%	3	0.07%	2,304	50.80%	4,535
Menominee	4,005	53.91%	3,367	45.32%	47	0.63%	10	0.13%	638	8.59%	7,429
Midland	5,473	71.65%	2,041	26.72%	119	1.56%	6	0.08%	3,432	44.93%	7,639
Missaukee	1,916	76.33%	575	22.91%	16	0.64%	2	0.08%	1,341	53.43%	2,510
Monroe	11,266	62.24%	6,684	36.93%	120	0.66%	30	0.17%	4,582	25.31%	18,100
Montcalm	5,867	73.10%	2,045	25.48%	101	1.26%	13	0.16%	3,822	47.62%	8,026
Montmorency	916	53.32%	783	45.58%	13	0.76%	6	0.35%	133	7.74%	1,718
Muskegon	15,603	58.39%	10,881	40.72%	171	0.64%	68	0.25%	4,722	17.67%	26,723
Newaygo	4,003	75.43%	1,226	23.10%	69	1.30%	9	0.17%	2,777	52.33%	5,307
Oakland	55,123	64.70%	29,220	34.30%	438	0.51%	416	0.49%	25,903	30.40%	85,197
Oceana	2,738	67.46%	1,214	29.91%	100	2.46%	7	0.17%	1,524	37.55%	4,059
Ogemaw	1,947	74.63%	638	24.45%	21	0.80%	3	0.11%	1,309	50.17%	2,609
Ontonagon	2,509	51.18%	2,381	48.57%	12	0.24%	0	0.00%	128	2.61%	4,902
Osceola	3,205	78.52%	822	20.14%	52	1.27%	3	0.07%	2,383	58.38%	4,082
Oscoda	585	64.86%	308	34.15%	8	0.89%	1	0.11%	277	30.71%	902
Otsego	1,399	64.50%	754	34.76%	16	0.74%	0	0.00%	645	29.74%	2,169
Ottawa	14,400	71.28%	5,611	27.77%	154	0.76%	38	0.19%	8,789	43.50%	20,203
Presque Isle	2,116	62.22%	1,277	37.55%	5	0.15%	3	0.09%	839	24.67%	3,401
Roscommon	1,494	74.37%	499	24.84%	10	0.50%	6	0.30%	995	49.53%	2,009
Saginaw	21,731	63.54%	12,074	35.31%	313	0.92%	81	0.24%	9,657	28.24%	34,199
Sanilac	7,444	80.22%	1,577	17.00%	250	2.69%	8	0.09%	5,867	63.23%	9,279
Schoolcraft	1,607	56.45%	1,231	43.24%	7	0.25%	2	0.07%	376	13.21%	2,847
Shiawassee	8,669	69.71%	3,564	28.66%	191	1.54%	11	0.09%	5,105	41.05%	12,435
St. Clair	16,731	75.62%	5,002	22.61%	354	1.60%	39	0.18%	11,729	53.01%	22,126
St. Joseph	7,549	67.91%	3,301	29.69%	265	2.38%	2	0.02%	4,248	38.21%	11,117
Tuscola	6,897	74.98%	2,115	22.99%	181	1.97%	5	0.05%	4,782	51.99%	9,198
Van Buren	9,341	74.38%	3,106	24.73%	84	0.67%	27	0.22%	6,235	49.65%	12,558
Washtenaw	22,438	72.35%	8,285	26.71%	210	0.68%	80	0.26%	14,153	45.64%	31,013
Wayne	344,573	53.01%	300,091	46.16%	2,473	0.38%	2,919	0.45%	44,482	6.84%	650,056
Wexford	3,958	69.17%	1,702	29.74%	59	1.03%	3	0.05%	2,256	39.43%	5,722
Total	1,003,878	60.28%	644,540	38.70%	11,974	0.72%	5,071	0.30%	359,338	21.58%	1,665,475

===== Counties that flipped from Democratic to Republican =====
- Genesee
- Marquette
- Wayne
