= Charles Sedgwick =

Charles Sedgwick or Sedgewick may refer to:

- Charles B. Sedgwick, New York state lawyer and politician
- Charles Sumner Sedgwick, Minneapolis architect, whose name has sometimes been presented as "Charles Sedgewick"

== See also ==
- Charles H. Sedgwick House, a work by architect Joseph Lyman Silsbee
- Charles Sedgwick May, American politician
- Charles Sedgwick Minot, American anatomist
