= Vernon J. Brown =

American politician (1874–1964)

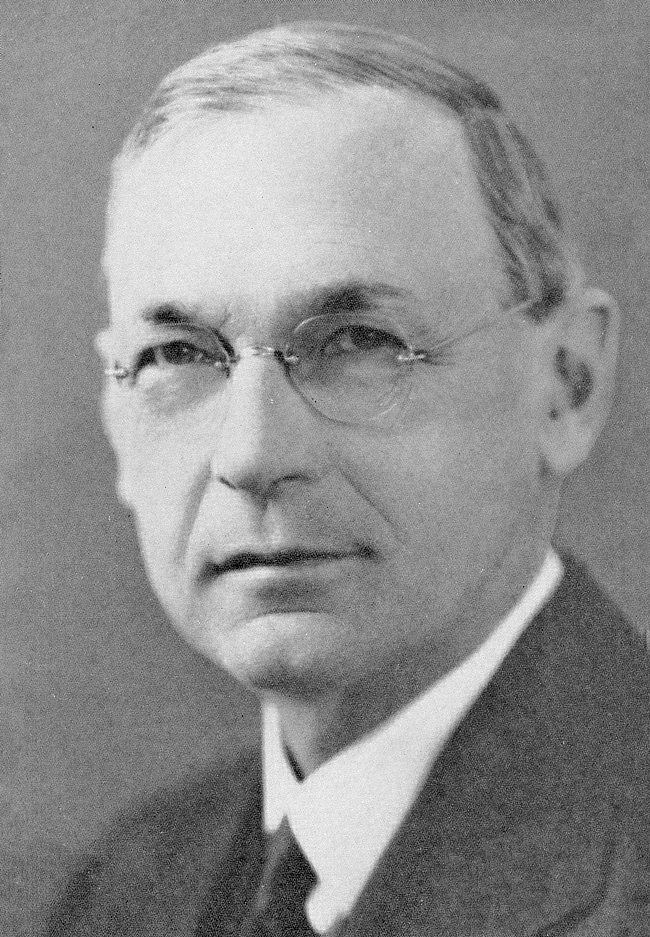

46th Lieutenant Governor of Michigan
- In office 1945–1946
- Governor: Harry Kelly
- Preceded by: Eugene C. Keyes
- Succeeded by: Eugene C. Keyes

Michigan Auditor General
- In office 1939–1944
- Governor: Murray Van Wagoner; Harry Kelly
- Preceded by: George T. Gundry
- Succeeded by: John D. Morrison

Member of the Michigan House of Representatives from the Ingham County 2nd district
- In office January 1, 1929 – 1938

Personal details
- Born: March 20, 1874 Vevay Township, Michigan
- Died: April 8, 1964 (aged 90) Webberville, Michigan
- Party: Republican
- Spouse: Maud R. DeCamp
- Children: 5, including Jim N. Brown

Vernon Jacobs Brown (March 20, 1874 – April 8, 1964) was the 46th lieutenant governor of Michigan.

== Early life ==
Brown was born to parents John Madison and Nancy Brown on March 20, 1874, in Vevay, Ingham County, Michigan. Brown attended high school in Mason, Michigan.

== Career ==
In 1905, Brown worked as a farmer. In his first political job, Brown served as Vevay Township clerk in Ingham County, Michigan, at the age of 21. He held numerous other local elected positions, including Ingham County Clerk from 1919 until 1922. After this, he purchased Ingham County News and became editor and publisher. Brown continued his political career was then elected to the Michigan House of Representatives from the 2nd District of Ingham County on November 6, 1928. He was sworn in on January 2, 1929. He would serve in this legislative body until 1938. Brown then served as Michigan Auditor General from 1938 to 1944. After this, Brown was elected to the position of Lieutenant Governor of Michigan alongside Michigan Governor Harry Kelly. After his term as Lieutenant Governor, Brown ran for the governorship in the Republican primary for the 1946 gubernatorial election, but was unsuccessful.

== Associations ==
Brown was a member of the Freemasons, the Kiwanis, and was in the Benevolent and Protective Order of Elks. Brown was Presbyterian.

== Death ==
Brown died on April 8, 1964, in Webberville, Michigan.
