= Alonzo Sessions =

American politician

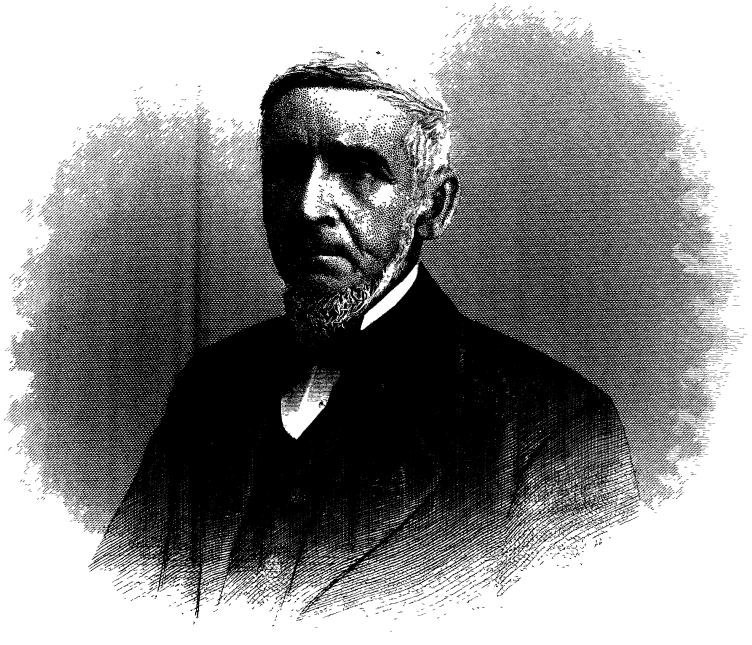
Alonzo Sessions

Alonzo Sessions (August 4, 1810 – July 3, 1886) was an American politician from the U. S. state of Michigan.

== Biography ==
Sessions was born to Amasa and Pheobe (Smith) Sessions in Marcellus, New York. He acquired an early education and taught school. In 1831 he moved to Bennington and worked in a store as a clerk for two years receiving $10 a month and board.

In 1833, Sessions left New York and traveled to Michigan mostly on foot. After traveling all over Michigan, he wound up in White Pigeon where the U. S. land office was and entered his land. The next winter he taught school in Dayton, Ohio until 1835 when he bought a team and came through his land on the south side of Grand River. He also built the first log cabin in the Township of Berlin and managed an 800-acre (3.2 km^{2}) farm. In 1837 he married Celia Dexter. They had thirteen children together. He served as the first supervisor of Berlin; first chairman of the board of supervisors for Ionia County; justice of the peace for eight years; and sheriff from 1841-42.

In 1856, Sessions was elected as a Republican from Ionia County (2nd district) to the Michigan House of Representatives and served from 1857-62. He co-founded and served as director and president of the First National Bank of Ionia. In 1872 he served as a Presidential Elector for Michigan casting his vote for incumbent U. S. President Ulysses S. Grant.

In 1876 and 1878, Sessions was elected as the 21st lieutenant governor of Michigan and served under Governor Charles Croswell from 1877–1881. Sessions was also a member of The Grange. He died five years after leaving office.

Political offices
| Preceded by Henry H. Holt | Lieutenant Governor of Michigan; 1877–1881 | Succeeded by Moreau S. Crosby |
