= Dwight May =

American politician (1822–1880)

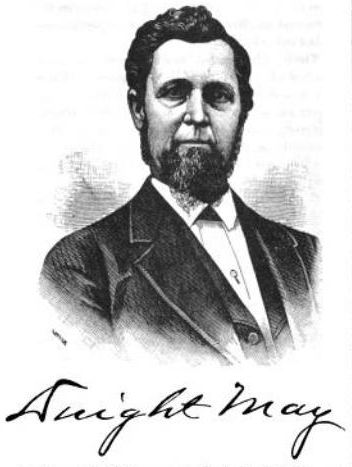

Dwight May (September 8, 1822 – January 28, 1880) was a politician from the U. S. state of Michigan who also served as officer in the Union Army during the American Civil War.

== Early life ==
May was born in Sandisfield, Massachusetts to Rockwell and Celestia (Underwood) May and moved to Richland, Michigan at the approximate age of twelve. There he worked on the farm and attended district schools. In 1842, he attended the Kalamazoo branch of the University of Michigan (now Kalamazoo College), entered the sophomore class in 1846, and graduated in 1849 from the classical department. During that time he became a member of Alpha Delta Phi.

In 1849, he married Amelia Stryker Kellogg in Sherwood. They had three daughters. After graduating he entered the law office of Lathrop & Duffield in Detroit and in July 1850 was admitted to the bar at the Michigan Supreme Court. The following month he opened an office in Battle Creek, and two years later moved to Kalamazoo forming a co-partnership with Marsh Giddings. In 1854, he was elected prosecuting attorney and served from 1855 to 1862. He also served as school inspector for two years and superintendent of the village schools from 1853 to 1856.

In 1861, May enlisted as a private in the Kalamazoo Light Guards and was elected captain of company I, 2nd Michigan Infantry. He resigned from the post that December to attend to personal and legal business. On October 8, 1862, he was commissioned lieutenant colonel of the 25th Michigan infantry at Bolivar, Tennessee, and served through the rest of the American Civil War.

May served in the battles of Blackburn's Ford, Manassas (1st battle), Middleburg, Vicksburg, Little Rock and Clarendon. In June 1865 he succeeded Colonel W. H. Graves in command of the 12th Michigan Infantry Regiment and was soon afterwards brevetted brigadier general and mustered out of the service on March 6, 1866.

== Politics ==
May was a Republican.

In 1866, May was elected the 18th lieutenant governor of Michigan as well as trustee of the village of Kalamazoo. He served as lieutenant governor from 1867 to 1869 under Governor Henry Crapo's second term. His brother Charles S. May had also served as lieutenant governor from 1863 to 1865.

In 1868, he was elected to the office of Michigan Attorney General and served from 1869 to 1873 under Governor Henry P. Baldwin. In 1874, he was elected president of the village of Kalamazoo and was re-elected the following year.

== Death ==
Dwight May died January 28, 1880, aged 57. He was buried at Mountain Home Cemetery of Kalamazoo.

== See also ==
Political offices
Preceded by Ebenezer O. Grosvenor	Lieutenant Governor of Michigan; 1867–1869	Succeeded by Morgan Bates
Legal offices
Preceded by William L. Stoughton	Michigan Attorney General; 1869–1873	Succeeded by Byron D. Ball
