= Kim Sigler =

American politician

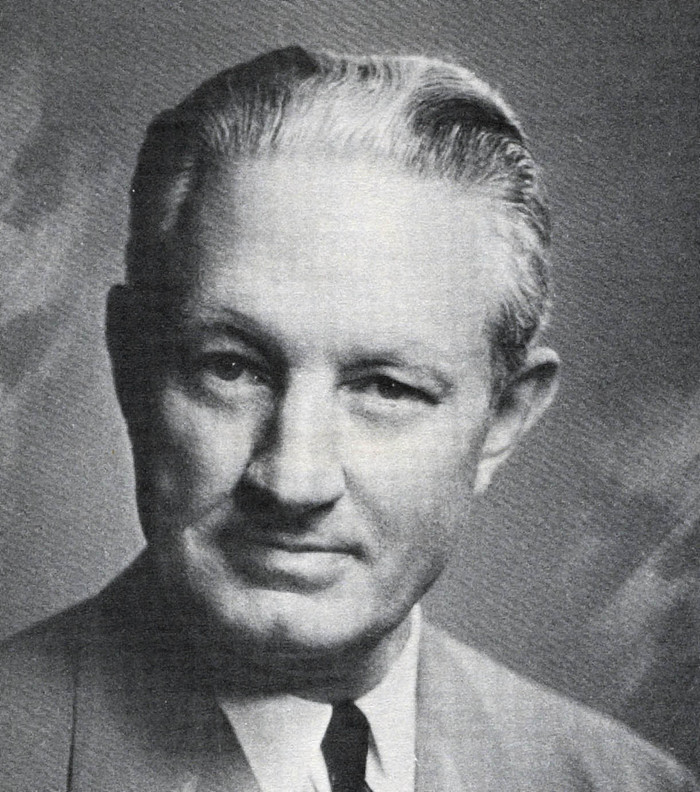
- Photo used in ads for 1948 reelection campaign, including Detroit Free Press, November 1, 1948.

40th Governor of Michigan
- In office January 1, 1947 – January 1, 1949
- Lieutenant: Eugene C. Keyes
- Preceded by: Harry Kelly
- Succeeded by: G. Mennen Williams

Personal details
- Born: Kimber Cornellus Zeigler; May 2, 1894 Schuyler, Nebraska, U.S.
- Died: November 30, 1953 (aged 59) Augusta, Michigan, U.S.
- Party: Republican
- Spouse: Mae L. Pierson
- Education: University of Michigan, University of Detroit Mercy

Kimber Cornellus Sigler, commonly known as Kim Sigler (né Zeigler; May 2, 1894 – November 30, 1953), was an American attorney and politician who served as the 40th governor of Michigan from 1947 to 1949. To date, Sigler is the last Republican to lose reelection as Governor of Michigan, losing to long-serving Governor G. Mennen Williams in 1948.

== Early life ==
Sigler was born Kimber Cornellus Zeigler in Schuyler, Nebraska, the son of Bertha and David Zeigler. The family's surname was changed to Sigler during World War I. He was educated at the University of Michigan, and later at the University of Detroit Mercy where, in 1918, he received a law degree. Sigler established a successful legal career in various firms in Detroit, Hastings and Battle Creek, Michigan. He was also the special prosecutor in the grand jury investigation of corruption in the state legislature. He married Mae L. Pierson and they had one child together.

== Politics ==
In 1928, Sigler was the Democratic candidate for Michigan Attorney General, yet was unsuccessful losing to Republican Wilber Marion Brucker, who was elected Governor of Michigan two years later. Sigler would later switch to the Republican Party. In 1942, he was a candidate in the Republican primary from the 8th District for a seat in the state senate. He was also a member of a Rotary Club.

On November 5, 1946, Sigler, nicknamed Hollywood Kim, was elected Governor of Michigan, defeating former governor Murray Van Wagoner in the general election. During his two years in office, state agencies were reorganized and the department of administration was created. In 1947, he received his Private Pilot License.

In 1948, he served as a delegate to the Republican National Convention, which re-nominated Thomas Dewey as their candidate for U.S. President to defeat President Harry S Truman, yet Dewey was again unsuccessful as he was against Franklin Roosevelt four years earlier. Dewey carried Michigan, but Sigler was unsuccessful that year, as he was defeated for re-election for governor by Democrat Soapy Williams. After running unsuccessfully for re-election, Sigler left office on January 1, 1949, and retired from political life.

== Retirement and death ==
Nearly five years after leaving office, at the age of fifty-nine, Sigler and three passengers were killed when the plane he was piloting on a foggy night collided with a television broadcast tower (WBCK-TV) near Augusta, Michigan. He was interred at Riverside Cemetery of Hastings, Michigan.

A portrait of Governor Sigler, painted by John Coppin, hangs in the rotunda of the Michigan State Capitol.

== Historical marker ==
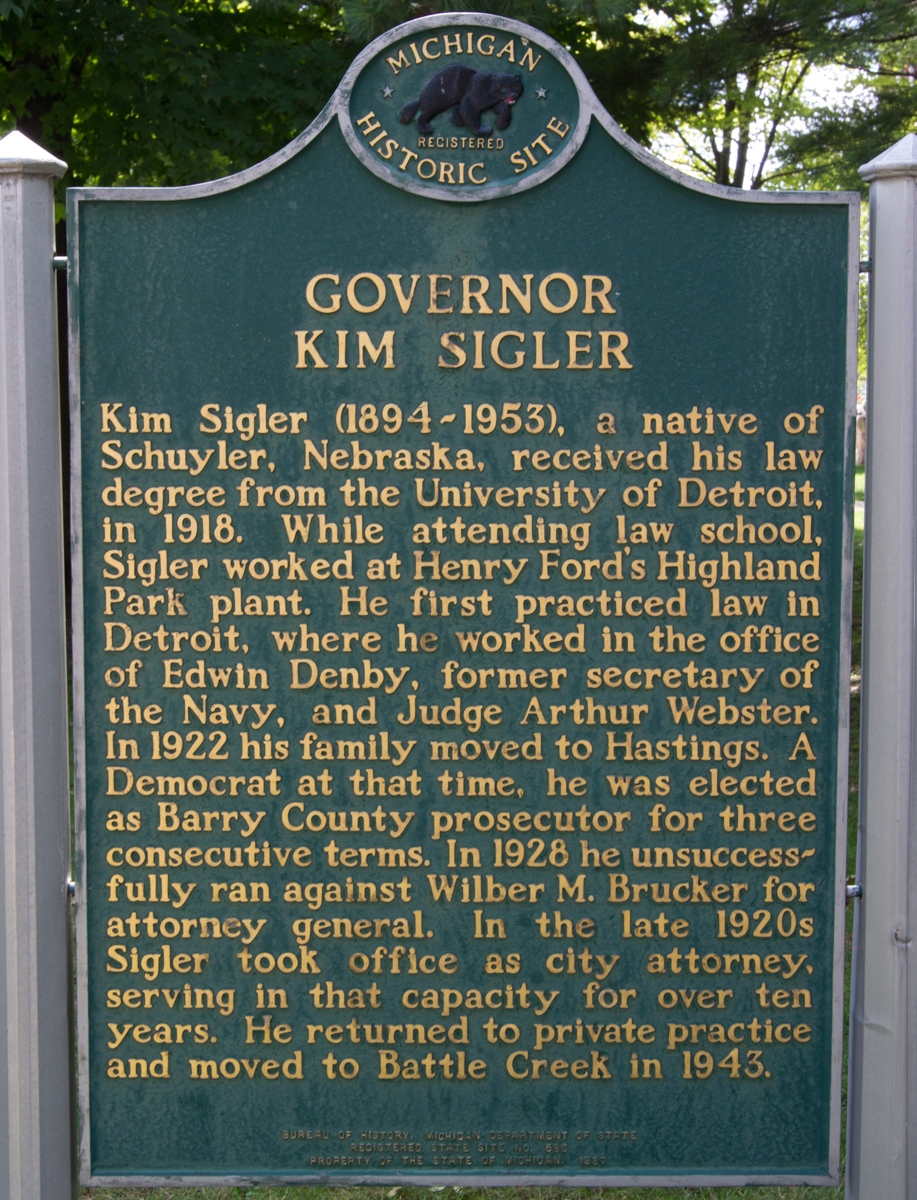
Governor Kim Sigler Historical Marker in Hastings, Michigan

A marker designating Sigler's home in Hastings as a Michigan Historic Site was erected in 1987 by the Bureau of History, Michigan Department of State. The inscription reads:

Kim Sigler (1894-1953), a native of Schuyler, Nebraska, received his law degree from the University of Detroit in 1918. While attending law school, Sigler worked at Henry Ford’s Highland Park plant. He first practiced law in Detroit, where he worked in the office of Edwin Denby, former secretary of the navy, and Judge Arthur Webster. In 1922 his family moved to Hastings. A Democrat at that time, he was elected as Barry County prosecutor for three consecutive terms. In 1928 he unsuccessfully ran against Wilber M. Brucker for attorney general. In the late 1920s Sigler took office as city attorney, serving in that capacity for over ten years. He returned to private practice and moved to Battle Creek in 1943. Kim Sigler’s vigor and courtroom manner led to his selection as a special prosecutor for a grand jury probe of legislative graft in 1943. The success of this investigation gave him a statewide reputation. Though originally a Democrat, he won the Republican gubernatorial nomination and election in 1946. His was one of the largest gubernatorial majorities in the country that year. In office, he created the Department of Administration, effected changes in the Prison and Corrections Department, and revitalized the unemployment compensation program and the Public Service Commission. However, he faced an uncooperative legislature and division within his cabinet. He was defeated for reelection in 1948. He died while piloting his own plane in a crash near Battle Creek on November 30, 1953.

Party political offices
Preceded by Harry Kelly	Republican nominee for Governor of Michigan; 1946, 1948	Succeeded by Harry Kelly
Political offices
Preceded by Harry Kelly	Governor of Michigan; 1947 – 1949	Succeeded by G. Mennen Williams
