= 1942 Michigan gubernatorial election =

- November 3, 1942
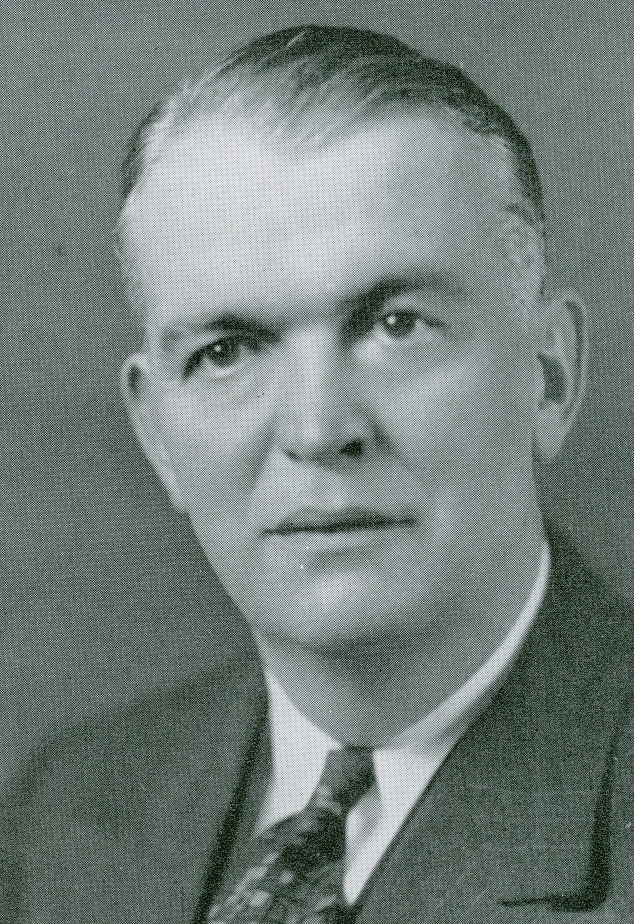

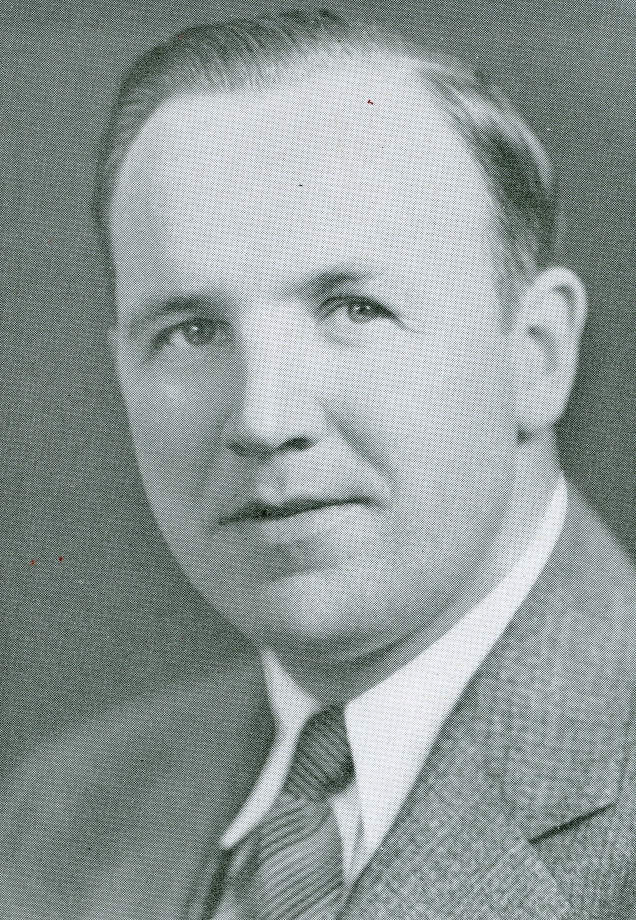
Nominee	Harry Kelly	Murray Van Wagoner
Party	Republican	Democratic
Popular vote	645,335	573,314
Percentage	52.60%	46.73%
- County results Kelly: 50–60% 60–70% 70–80% Van Wagoner: 50–60%
Governor before election
Murray Van Wagoner
Democratic
Elected Governor
Harry Kelly
Republican

The 1942 Michigan gubernatorial election was held on November 3, 1942. Republican nominee Harry Kelly defeated incumbent Democrat Murray Van Wagoner with 52.60% of the vote. This was the sixth consecutive gubernatorial election in Michigan in which the incumbent party was defeated.

== Primary election ==
Michigan held primary elections on September 15, 1942.

=== Democratic party ===
Incumbent governor Murray Van Wagoner was renominated without opposition.

==== Candidates ====
- Murray Van Wagoner, incumbent governor

==== Results ====
Democratic primary results
Party	Candidate	Votes	%
Democratic	Murray Van Wagoner (inc.)	176,266	99.99%
Democratic	Scattering	16	0.01%
Total votes		176,282	100.00%

=== Republican party ===
Secretary of State Harry F. Kelly won the Republican nomination unopposed.

==== Candidates ====
- Harry F. Kelly, Secretary of State of Michigan

==== Results ====
Republican primary results
Party	Candidate	Votes	%
Republican	Harry F. Kelly	315,458	99.97%
Republican	Scattering	90	0.03%
Total votes		315,548	100.00%

== General election ==
=== Candidates ===
Major party candidates

- Harry F. Kelly, Republican
- Murray Van Wagoner, Democratic

Other candidates

- Frederic S. Goodrich, Prohibition

=== Results ===
1942 Michigan gubernatorial election
Party	Candidate	Votes	%	±%
Republican	Harry F. Kelly	645,335	52.60%	+6.02%
Democratic	Murray Van Wagoner (inc.)	573,314	46.73%	−6.32%
Prohibition	Frederic S. Goodrich	8,065	0.66%	
	Scattering	60	0.00%	
Majority		72,021	5.87%	
Total votes		1,226,774	100.00%	
Republican gain from Democratic		Swing	+12.34%	

==== Results by county ====
County	Harry F. Kelly Republican		Murray Van Wagoner Democratic		Frederic S. Goodrich Prohibition		Scattering Write-in		Margin		Total votes cast
County	#	%	#	%	#	%	#	%	#	%	Total votes cast
Alcona	996	68.08%	463	31.65%	4	0.27%	0	0.00%	533	36.43%	1,463
Alger	1,034	40.66%	1,497	58.87%	12	0.47%	0	0.00%	-463	-18.21%	2,543
Allegan	7,742	78.42%	2,064	20.91%	67	0.68%	0	0.00%	5,678	57.51%	9,873
Alpena	2,688	57.87%	1,938	41.72%	19	0.41%	0	0.00%	750	16.15%	4,645
Antrim	1,721	68.84%	751	30.04%	28	1.12%	0	0.00%	970	38.80%	2,500
Arenac	1,542	63.61%	874	36.06%	8	0.33%	0	0.00%	668	27.56%	2,424
Baraga	1,508	52.78%	1,345	47.08%	4	0.14%	0	0.00%	163	5.71%	2,857
Barry	4,040	71.50%	1,363	24.12%	246	4.35%	1	0.02%	2,677	47.38%	5,650
Bay	9,810	50.37%	9,591	49.25%	73	0.37%	1	0.01%	219	1.12%	19,475
Benzie	1,496	68.37%	679	31.03%	13	0.59%	0	0.00%	817	37.34%	2,188
Berrien	15,244	68.21%	7,022	31.42%	81	0.36%	0	0.00%	8,222	36.79%	22,347
Branch	4,251	71.99%	1,579	26.74%	74	1.25%	1	0.02%	2,672	45.25%	5,905
Calhoun	11,584	59.33%	7,501	38.42%	440	2.25%	0	0.00%	4,083	20.91%	19,525
Cass	4,592	71.45%	1,804	28.07%	30	0.47%	1	0.02%	2,788	43.38%	6,427
Charlevoix	1,994	63.83%	1,108	35.47%	22	0.70%	0	0.00%	886	28.36%	3,124
Cheboygan	2,318	56.76%	1,741	42.63%	25	0.61%	0	0.00%	577	14.13%	4,084
Chippewa	4,102	59.76%	2,737	39.87%	25	0.36%	0	0.00%	1,365	19.89%	6,834
Clare	1,932	73.04%	697	26.35%	16	0.60%	0	0.00%	1,235	46.69%	2,645
Clinton	5,192	76.56%	1,535	22.63%	54	0.80%	1	0.01%	3,657	53.92%	6,782
Crawford	527	54.95%	428	44.63%	4	0.42%	0	0.00%	99	10.32%	959
Delta	4,622	49.52%	4,688	50.23%	23	0.25%	0	0.00%	-66	-0.71%	9,333
Dickinson	4,322	48.58%	4,470	50.24%	105	1.18%	0	0.00%	-148	-1.66%	8,897
Eaton	6,223	67.43%	2,862	31.01%	144	1.56%	0	0.00%	3,361	36.42%	9,229
Emmet	2,554	59.55%	1,708	39.82%	26	0.61%	1	0.02%	846	19.72%	4,289
Genesee	22,613	47.73%	24,448	51.61%	312	0.66%	0	0.00%	-1,835	-3.87%	47,373
Gladwin	1,600	70.24%	652	28.62%	26	1.14%	0	0.00%	948	41.62%	2,278
Gogebic	5,129	46.75%	5,742	52.34%	100	0.91%	0	0.00%	-613	-5.59%	10,971
Grand Traverse	2,917	64.35%	1,577	34.79%	39	0.86%	0	0.00%	1,340	29.56%	4,533
Gratiot	4,938	67.34%	2,242	30.57%	152	2.07%	1	0.01%	2,696	36.77%	7,333
Hillsdale	5,283	70.88%	2,036	27.32%	134	1.80%	0	0.00%	3,247	43.57%	7,453
Houghton	7,357	50.35%	7,204	49.30%	52	0.36%	0	0.00%	153	1.05%	14,613
Huron	7,636	78.78%	2,024	20.88%	27	0.28%	6	0.06%	5,612	57.90%	9,693
Ingham	19,318	59.32%	12,873	39.53%	373	1.15%	2	0.01%	6,445	19.79%	32,566
Ionia	5,728	66.71%	2,729	31.78%	124	1.44%	5	0.06%	2,999	34.93%	8,586
Iosco	1,530	63.75%	854	35.58%	16	0.67%	0	0.00%	676	28.17%	2,400
Iron	3,027	50.40%	2,906	48.38%	73	1.22%	0	0.00%	121	2.01%	6,006
Isabella	4,183	69.19%	1,803	29.82%	59	0.98%	1	0.02%	2,380	39.36%	6,046
Jackson	12,382	61.65%	7,498	37.33%	203	1.01%	1	0.00%	4,884	24.32%	20,084
Kalamazoo	14,084	64.09%	7,443	33.87%	443	2.02%	7	0.03%	6,641	30.22%	21,977
Kalkaska	655	69.68%	266	28.30%	19	2.02%	0	0.00%	389	41.38%	940
Kent	32,116	57.45%	23,228	41.55%	559	1.00%	0	0.00%	8,888	15.90%	55,903
Keweenaw	719	49.15%	741	50.65%	3	0.21%	0	0.00%	-22	-1.50%	1,463
Lake	917	68.43%	418	31.19%	5	0.37%	0	0.00%	499	37.24%	1,340
Lapeer	4,444	71.86%	1,695	27.41%	45	0.73%	0	0.00%	2,749	44.45%	6,184
Leelanau	1,360	71.65%	537	28.29%	1	0.05%	0	0.00%	823	43.36%	1,898
Lenawee	8,400	64.30%	4,566	34.95%	94	0.72%	3	0.02%	3,834	29.35%	13,063
Livingston	4,349	64.28%	2,356	34.82%	61	0.90%	0	0.00%	1,993	29.46%	6,766
Luce	980	62.26%	587	37.29%	7	0.44%	0	0.00%	393	24.97%	1,574
Mackinac	1,699	58.24%	1,213	41.58%	5	0.17%	0	0.00%	486	16.66%	2,917
Macomb	12,366	49.57%	12,448	49.90%	130	0.52%	2	0.01%	-82	-0.33%	24,946
Manistee	3,230	57.48%	2,369	42.16%	20	0.36%	0	0.00%	861	15.32%	5,619
Marquette	7,031	52.29%	6,222	46.28%	192	1.43%	0	0.00%	809	6.02%	13,445
Mason	2,973	59.73%	1,980	39.78%	24	0.48%	0	0.00%	993	19.95%	4,977
Mecosta	2,630	75.44%	819	23.49%	37	1.06%	0	0.00%	1,811	51.95%	3,486
Menominee	3,968	55.39%	3,182	44.42%	14	0.20%	0	0.00%	786	10.97%	7,164
Midland	3,419	63.76%	1,903	35.49%	40	0.75%	0	0.00%	1,516	28.27%	5,362
Missaukee	1,454	71.24%	561	27.49%	26	1.27%	0	0.00%	893	43.75%	2,041
Monroe	7,962	52.58%	7,128	47.07%	49	0.32%	4	0.03%	834	5.51%	15,143
Montcalm	4,659	69.12%	1,992	29.55%	86	1.28%	3	0.04%	2,667	39.57%	6,740
Montmorency	742	65.32%	392	34.51%	2	0.18%	0	0.00%	350	30.81%	1,136
Muskegon	9,793	52.25%	8,848	47.21%	101	0.54%	0	0.00%	945	5.04%	18,742
Newaygo	3,709	78.27%	1,002	21.14%	28	0.59%	0	0.00%	2,707	57.12%	4,739
Oakland	28,568	51.27%	26,903	48.28%	241	0.43%	7	0.01%	1,665	2.99%	55,719
Oceana	2,501	66.69%	1,202	32.05%	47	1.25%	0	0.00%	1,299	34.64%	3,750
Ogemaw	1,524	70.30%	627	28.92%	17	0.78%	0	0.00%	897	41.37%	2,168
Ontonagon	2,255	50.10%	2,233	49.61%	13	0.29%	0	0.00%	22	0.49%	4,501
Osceola	2,570	76.44%	756	22.49%	35	1.04%	1	0.03%	1,814	53.96%	3,362
Oscoda	589	67.08%	288	32.80%	1	0.11%	0	0.00%	301	34.28%	878
Otsego	1,018	57.38%	745	42.00%	11	0.62%	0	0.00%	273	15.39%	1,774
Ottawa	10,071	71.36%	3,946	27.96%	96	0.68%	0	0.00%	6,125	43.40%	14,113
Presque Isle	1,531	53.51%	1,320	46.14%	10	0.35%	0	0.00%	211	7.38%	2,861
Roscommon	948	68.30%	430	30.98%	10	0.72%	0	0.00%	518	37.32%	1,388
Saginaw	17,316	57.20%	12,804	42.30%	151	0.50%	0	0.00%	4,512	14.91%	30,271
Sanilac	6,071	78.82%	1,575	20.45%	54	0.70%	2	0.03%	4,496	58.37%	7,702
Schoolcraft	1,501	58.91%	1,044	40.97%	3	0.12%	0	0.00%	457	17.94%	2,548
Shiawassee	6,324	64.83%	3,273	33.56%	155	1.59%	2	0.02%	3,051	31.28%	9,754
St. Clair	11,403	66.04%	5,819	33.70%	44	0.25%	0	0.00%	5,584	32.34%	17,266
St. Joseph	6,103	70.83%	2,465	28.61%	45	0.52%	3	0.03%	3,638	42.22%	8,616
Tuscola	6,000	74.68%	1,978	24.62%	56	0.70%	0	0.00%	4,022	50.06%	8,034
Van Buren	7,435	73.13%	2,679	26.35%	53	0.52%	0	0.00%	4,756	46.78%	10,167
Washtenaw	10,893	63.11%	6,269	36.32%	94	0.54%	4	0.02%	4,624	26.79%	17,260
Wayne	178,740	39.81%	268,618	59.83%	1,639	0.37%	0	0.00%	-89,878	-20.02%	448,997
Wexford	2,640	64.12%	1,411	34.27%	66	1.60%	0	0.00%	1,229	29.85%	4,117
Total	645,335	52.60%	573,314	46.73%	8,065	0.66%	60	0.00%	72,021	5.87%	1,226,774

===== Counties that flipped from Democratic to Republican =====
- Bay
- Cheboygan
- Chippewa
- Crawford
- Houghton
- Iron
- Manistee
- Marquette
- Menominee
- Monroe
- Muskegon
- Oakland
- Ontonagon
- Presque Isle
- Schoolcraft
