= Ebenezer O. Grosvenor =

American politician (1820–1910)

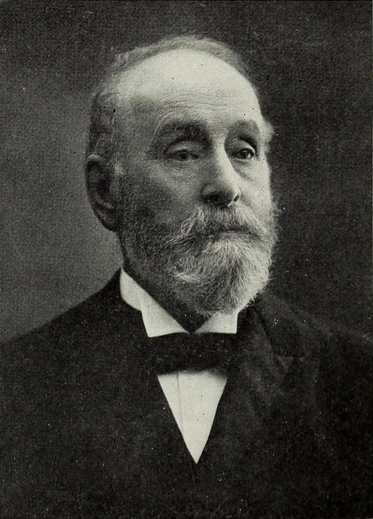

State Treasurer of Michigan
- In office 1867–1871
- Governor: Henry H. Crapo; Henry P. Baldwin
- Preceded by: John Owen
- Succeeded by: Victory P. Collier

17th Lieutenant Governor of Michigan
- In office 1865–1867
- Governor: Henry H. Crapo
- Preceded by: Charles S. May
- Succeeded by: Dwight May

Member of the Michigan Senate from the 14th district
- In office 1859–1860
- Preceded by: John McDermid
- Succeeded by: Edmund Burke Fairfield
- In office 1863–1864
- Preceded by: Frederick Fowler
- Succeeded by: John McDermid

Personal details
- Born: January 26, 1820 Stillwater, New York
- Died: March 10, 1910 (aged 90) Jonesville, Michigan
- Party: Whig, Republican
- Spouse: Sally Ann Champlin (m.1844)
- Children: 4

Ebenezer Oliver Grosvenor, Jr. (January 26, 1820 – March 10, 1910) was an American politician from the U. S. state of Michigan.

== Early life ==
Grosvenor was born in Stillwater, New York and received a common school and academic education. From the age of fifteen to seventeen he was a clerk in Chittenango, New York. He moved to Michigan in 1837 and worked as a clerk with his brother for two years in Albion. He was also a clerk in the state commissioner’s office in Monroe from 1839 to 1840, and a clerk in Jonesville from 1840 to 1844. In 1840, he became a charter member of the Odd Fellows in Jonesville and passed all the chairs of that Order.

On February 25, 1844 he married Sally Ann Champlin in Stillwater, New York and they had four children together. After returning to Michigan he became a merchant at Jonesville. In 1854, he established the banking house of Grosvenor & Co., in which he was president and manager. In 1855, he joined the Freemasons and achieved the rank of Master Mason. He also regularly attended the Presbyterian Church.

== Politics ==
Grosvenor was a Whig until 1854 and in 1858 he was elected as a Republican to the Michigan Senate serving in 1859. In 1861, he was president of the military contract board. Also in that year, he was commissioned a colonel on Governor Austin Blair's staff and was also president of the state military board. He was again elected to the stated senate and served from 1862 to 1864 and served on the committee on finance in 1862.

In 1864, Grosvenor was elected the 17th lieutenant governor of Michigan and served during Governor Henry H. Crapo's first term from 1865 to 1867. He was then appointed State Treasurer of Michigan from 1867 to 1871 during Crapo’s second term and Henry P. Baldwin's first term.

Grosvenor served a member and president of the board of state building commissioners from 1871 to 1879. He then served on the board of regents at the University of Michigan from 1879 to 1888. He was also long vice president of the Jackson & Fort Wayne railroad company and a director of some insurance companies and other corporations. In 1903, at the age of 83, he became a member of the Michigan Republican Party State Central Committee.

== Death and legacy ==
Grosvenor died at age 90 in Jonesville, Michigan. His home in Jonesville is now a museum.

== General references ==
- Profile, PoliticalGraveyard.com. Accessed March 28, 2024.
- Family Tree Maker’s Genealogy Site
- Bingham, Stephen D. (2005) [1888]. "s.v. Ebenezer O. Grosvenor". Early history of Michigan, with biographies of state officers, members of Congress, judges and legislators. Pub. pursuant to act 59, 1887. Ann Arbor, Mich.: University of Michigan Library. p. 314.

Political offices
Preceded by Charles S. May	Lieutenant Governor of Michigan; 1865–1867	Succeeded by Dwight May
Preceded by John Owen	Treasurer of Michigan; 1867–1870	Succeeded by Victory P. Collier
