= Frank Murphy (lieutenant governor) =

American politician

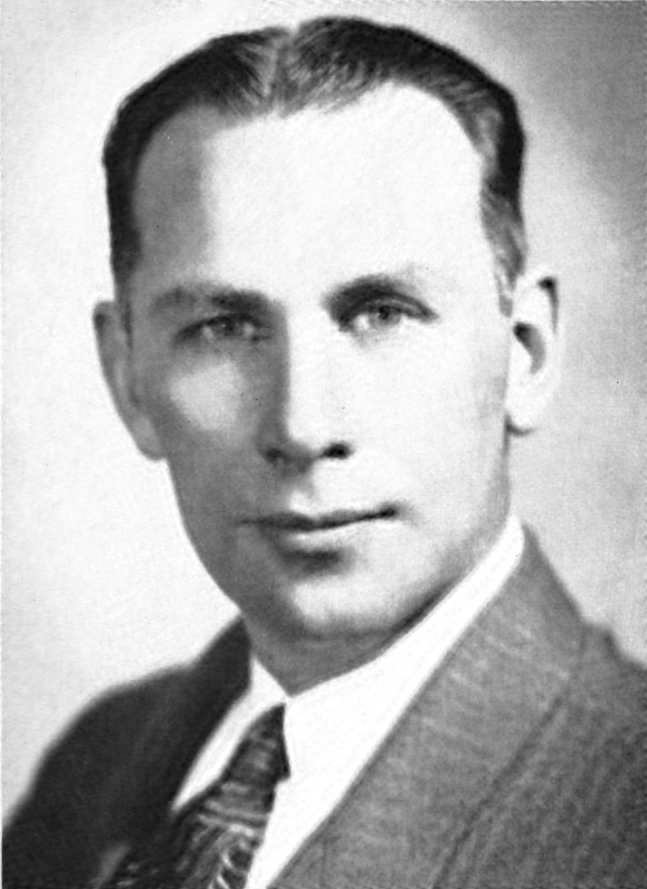

44th Lieutenant Governor of Michigan
- In office 1941–1942
- Governor: Murray Van Wagoner
- Preceded by: Matilda Dodge Wilson
- Succeeded by: Eugene C. Keyes

Personal details
- Born: May 15, 1897 Rensselaer, New York
- Died: December 25, 1944 (aged 47) Detroit, Michigan
- Party: Democratic
- Spouse: Constance Kirchner
- Children: 5
- Education: University of Detroit Mercy School of Law

Frank Murphy (May 15, 1897 – December 25, 1944) was the 44th lieutenant governor of Michigan.

== Early life and education ==
Murphy was born on May 15, 1897, in Rensselaer, New York. In 1920, Murphy moved to Detroit, Michigan. There, he attended the University of Detroit Mercy School of Law. In 1921, Murphy was a member of Gamma Eta Gamma.

== Career ==
In 1930, Murphy became an accountant. Under Governor Murphy, Murphy was appointed as state sales tax supervisor. In 1939, he ran unsuccessfully for a seat on the Detroit City Council. In 1940, he was elected as Lieutenant Governor of Michigan. His electoral success was often attributed to the fact that his name was identical to that of the Supreme Court justice, former governor, and mayor of Detroit, to whom he was not related. Murphy served as the 44th Lieutenant Governor of Michigan of from 1941 to 1942. He was a Democrat. By January 2, 1941, the Republican majority state senate took the power to appoint committees in the state senate away from Lieutenant Governor Murphy, and took on the power themselves. Murphy asked for unity in his first address to the state senate.

In 1942, Murphy failed to gain re-election as lieutenant governor. In 1943, he ran in the Detroit mayoral primary election. On October 5, he was defeated by Frank Fitzgerald, coming in fifth in the election.

In June 1944, Murphy pleaded guilty before Circuit Judge Leland Carr to accepting a $2,500 bribe from two distilleries in exchange for using his influence as lieutenant governor to promote Senate Bill 203 in 1941 which lowered the distilling license fee from $5,000 to $1,000. At the time of his confession, Murphy was very ill. He died before the court could sentence him.

== Personal life ==
Murphy was married to Constance Kirchner. Together they had five children. Murphy was a member of the Knights of Columbus. Murphy was Catholic.

== Death ==
On December 25, 1944, in Harper Hospital, Murphy died due to pneumonia which was complicated by heart problems that he had been suffering from for several months. He was interred in Mount Olivet Cemetery in Detroit.

== Electoral history ==
Frank Murphy electoral history

Michigan lieutenant gubernatorial Democratic primary, 1940
| Party | Candidate | Votes | % |
|---|---|---|---|
| Democratic | Frank Murphy | 110,910 | 33.46 |
| Democratic | Anthony J. Wilkowski | 61,092 | 18.43 |
| Democratic | David M. Martin | 53,595 | 16.17 |
| Democratic | James L. Murphy | 27,704 | 8.36 |
| Democratic | Don W. Canfield | 21,491 | 6.48 |
| Democratic | Edward T. Kane | 17,539 | 5.29 |
| Democratic | Charles J. Rydzewski | 14,958 | 4.51 |
| Democratic | Arthur C. E. Strom | 14,341 | 4.33 |
| Democratic | Frank J. Borka | 9,807 | 2.96 |
| Democratic | Write-ins | 5 | 0.00 |
| Total votes | | 331,442 | 100 |

Michigan lieutenant gubernatorial election, 1940
| Party | Candidate | Votes | % |
|---|---|---|---|
| Democratic | Frank Murphy | 994,583 | 50.3 |
| Republican | Eugene C. Keyes | 974,782 | 49.29 |
| Socialist | Charles Walter | 4,206 | 0.21 |
| Communist | Benjamin J. Faulkner | 2,398 | 0.12 |
| Prohibition | LeRoy M. Lowell | 1,131 | 0.06 |
| Socialist Labor | James C. Horvath | 739 | 0.04 |
| Write-ins | | 1 | 0.00 |
| Total votes | | 1,977,840 | 100 |

Michigan lieutenant gubernatorial Democratic primary, 1942
| Party | Candidate | Votes | % |
|---|---|---|---|
| Democratic | Frank Murphy (incumbent) | 156,476 | 99.98 |
| Democratic | Write-ins | 38 | 0.02 |
| Total votes | | 156,514 | 100 |

Michigan lieutenant gubernatorial election, 1942
| Party | Candidate | Votes | % |
|---|---|---|---|
| Republican | Eugene C. Keyes | 638,304 | 54.5 |
| Democratic | Frank Murphy (incumbent) | 525,096 | 44.83 |
| Prohibition | E. Harold Munn | 7,912 | 0.68 |
| Write-ins | | 4 | 0.00 |
| Total votes | | 1,171,316 | 100 |
