= Henry H. Holt =

American politician

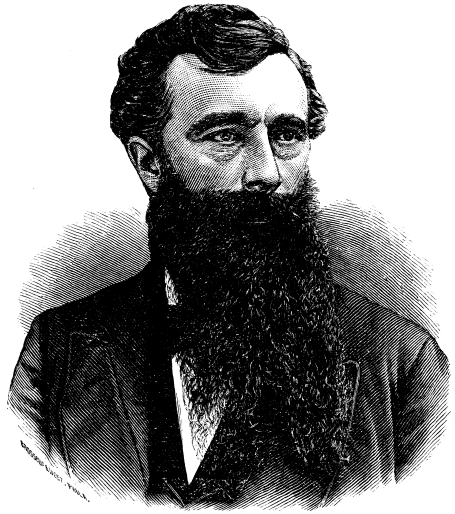

20th Lieutenant Governor of Michigan
- In office 1873–1876
- Governor: John J. Bagley
- Preceded by: Morgan Bates
- Succeeded by: Alonzo Sessions

Member of the Michigan House of Representatives from the Muskegon County 1st district
- In office 1887–1888
- Preceded by: William B. Wilson
- Succeeded by: William H. McKinstry

Member of the Michigan House of Representatives from the Muskegon County district
- In office 1879–1880
- Preceded by: Geo. M. Smith
- Succeeded by: William M. Harford
- In office 1867–1872
- Preceded by: Israel E. Carlton (for Muskegon and Oceana)
- Succeeded by: Charles C. Thompson

Personal details
- Born: March 27, 1831 Camden, New York
- Died: August 23, 1898 (aged 67) Muskegon, Michigan

Henry H. Holt (March 27, 1831 – August 23, 1898) was an American politician from the U. S. state of Michigan.

== Biography ==
Holt was born in Camden, New York and received an academic education, studied law and graduated from union law college of Ohio. In 1852, he moved to Kent County, Michigan near Grand Rapids where he received an academic education.

In 1855, Holt commenced the study of law in Poughkeepsie, New York for one year and then entered the Union Law College at Cleveland, Ohio and was admitted to the practice of law in July, 1857. He returned to Michigan that September of that year and practiced law in Grand Rapids. In 1858, he settled in Muskegon and served four years as circuit court commissioner and four years as prosecuting attorney of Ottawa County when Ottawa and Muskegon County were one.

Holt was elected as a Republican to the Michigan House of Representatives and served in 1867 and 1869–1872. During those four years he was Chairman of Ways and Means and was also a member of the Constitutional Convention of 1867. In 1872 and 1874, he was elected the 20th lieutenant governor of Michigan and served from 1873 to 1877 under Governor John J. Bagley. In 1873–1874, he traveled to Europe and in 1875-1876 traveled again to Europe as well as Constantinople, Egypt and the Holy Land.

Holt authored a book published in 1887 called History of the settlement of Muskegon . He died in 1898.

Political offices
Preceded by Morgan Bates	Lieutenant Governor of Michigan; 1873–1877	Succeeded by Alonzo Sessions
