= Morgan Bates =

American politician

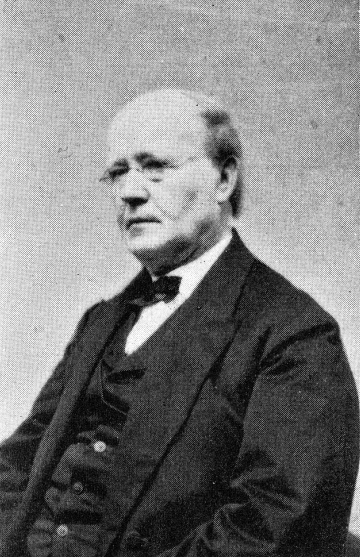

19th Lieutenant Governor of Michigan
- In office 1869–1873
- Governor: Henry P. Baldwin
- Preceded by: Dwight May
- Succeeded by: Henry H. Holt

Personal details
- Born: July 12, 1806 near Glens Falls, New York, U.S.
- Died: March 2, 1874 (aged 67) Traverse City, Michigan, U.S.
- Party: Republican

Morgan Bates (July 12, 1806 – March 2, 1874) was a politician from the U. S. state of Michigan.

== Early life and publishing career ==
Bates was born near Glens Falls, New York. He apprenticed as a printer at Sandy Hill and worked as a journeyman printer in Albany and other places. In 1826, he published the Warren Gazette in Warren, Pennsylvania; Horace Greeley worked for him as a journeyman printer. In 1828, he took charge of the Chautauqua Republican in Jamestown, New York. In 1830, he went to New York City and helped Greeley launch the New Yorker (not the modern magazine). In 1833, he was foreman with George Dawson in the office of the Detroit Advertiser, which he purchased in 1839, publishing it as a Whig paper until 1858. Between 1849 and 1856 he made two trips to California via Cape Horn and started the first daily paper west of the Rocky Mountains, the Alta California in San Francisco. In 1856, he became a clerk in the office of the Auditor General in Lansing, Michigan and served two years. Then he moved to Traverse City, Michigan and started the Grand Traverse Herald, which he published for sixteen years.

== Politics ==
Bates served as treasurer of Grand Traverse County from 1861 until his death in 1874, with the exception of a gap during the Andrew Johnson administration. He was also a delegate to the 1868 Republican National Convention which nominated Ulysses S. Grant for U. S. President.

In 1868, Bates was elected the 19th lieutenant governor of Michigan and served from 1869 to 1873 under Governor Henry P. Baldwin.

== Death ==
Bates died at the age of sixty-seven and is interred at Oakwood Cemetery in Traverse City.

Political offices
Preceded by Dwight May	Lieutenant Governor of Michigan; 1869–1873	Succeeded by Henry H. Holt
