= Bonesteel =

Bonesteel may refer to:

- Bonesteel, South Dakota, United States
- Charles H. Bonesteel III (1909–1977), American military commander
- Charles Hartwell Bonesteel, Jr. (1885–1964), American major general and the father of Charles H. Bonesteel III
- Chesley Bonestell (1888–1986), American painter
- Georgia Bonesteel (born 1936), American quilter
