= 1944 Michigan gubernatorial election =

- November 7, 1944
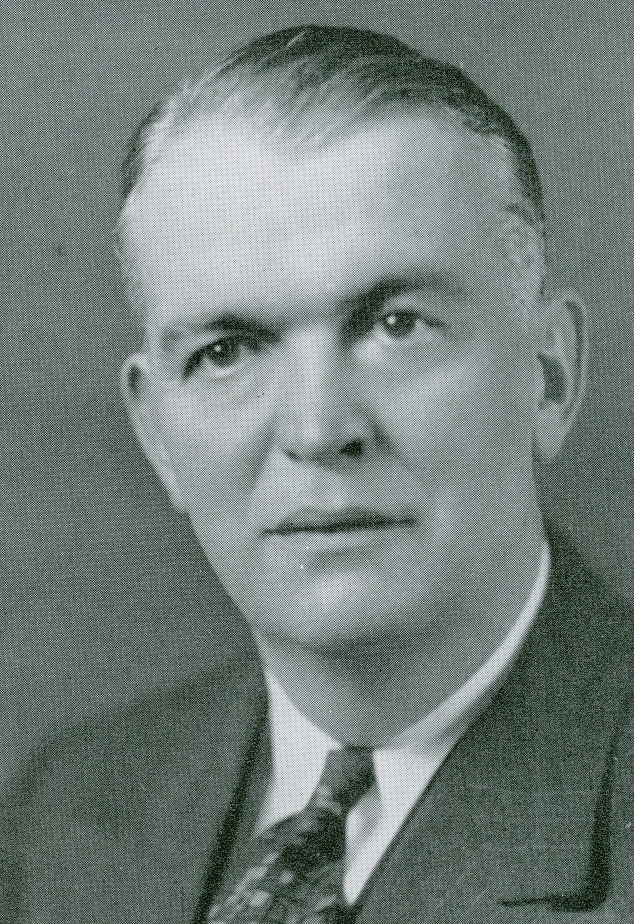

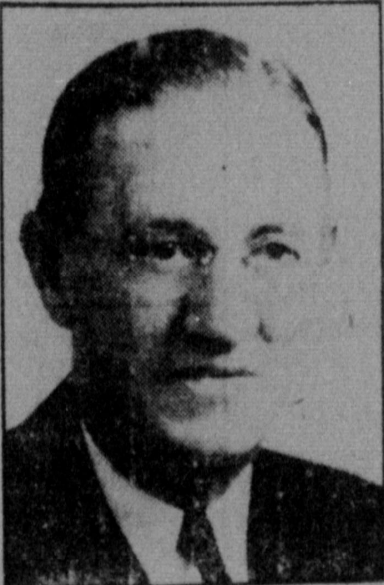
Nominee	Harry Kelly	Edward J. Fry
Party	Republican	Democratic
Popular vote	1,208,859	989,307
Percentage	54.69%	44.76%
- County results Kelly: 50–60% 60–70% 70–80% 80–90% Fry: 50–60%
Governor before election
Harry Kelly
Republican
Elected Governor
Harry Kelly
Republican

The 1944 Michigan gubernatorial election was held on November 7, 1944. Incumbent Republican Harry Kelly had defeated Democratic nominee Edward J. Fry with 54.69% of the vote.

== Primary election ==
Michigan held primary elections on July 11, 1944.

=== Republican party ===
Incumbent governor Harry F. Kelly was renominated without opposition.

==== Candidates ====
- Harry F. Kelly, incumbent governor

==== Results ====
Republican primary results
Party	Candidate	Votes	%
Republican	Harry F. Kelly (inc.)	283,176	99.99%
Republican	Scattering	29	0.01%
Total votes		283,205	100.00%

=== Democratic party ===
Edward J. Fry defeated William J. Cody for the Democratic nomination.

==== Candidates ====
- Earnest C. Brooks, former member of Michigan Senate
- William J. Cody, Wayne County circuit court commissioner
- Edward J. Fry, former chairman of Michigan Democratic Party

==== Results ====
Democratic primary results
Party	Candidate	Votes	%
Democratic	Edward J. Fry	71,420	45.25%
Democratic	William J. Cody	61,033	38.67%
Democratic	Earnest C. Brooks	25,373	16.08%
Democratic	Scattering	4	0.00%
Total votes		157,830	100.00%

== General election ==
=== Candidates ===
Major party candidates

- Harry F. Kelly, Republican
- Edward J. Fry, Democratic

Other candidates

- Seth A. Davey, Prohibition
- Forest Odell, Socialist
- Leland Marion, America First
- Theos A. Grove, Socialist Labor

=== Results ===
1944 Michigan gubernatorial election
Party	Candidate	Votes	%	±%
Republican	Harry F. Kelly (inc.)	1,208,859	54.69%	+2.09%
Democratic	Edward J. Fry	989,307	44.76%	−1.97%
Prohibition	Seth A. Davey	5,744	0.26%	−0.40%
Socialist	Forest Odell	2,851	0.13%	
America First	Leland Marion	2,121	0.10%	
Socialist Labor	Theos A. Grove	1,364	0.06%	
Majority		219,552	9.93%	
Total votes		2,210,246	100.00%	
Republican hold		Swing	+4.06%	

==== Results by county ====
County	Harry F. Kelly Republican		Edward J. Fry Democratic		All Others Various		Margin		Total votes cast
County	#	%	#	%	#	%	#	%	Total votes cast
Alcona	1,592	73.33%	566	26.07%	13	0.60%	1,026	47.26%	2,171
Alger	1,713	43.15%	2,248	56.62%	9	0.23%	-535	-13.48%	3,970
Allegan	12,804	76.32%	3,897	23.23%	75	0.45%	8,907	53.09%	16,776
Alpena	4,956	67.70%	2,352	32.13%	13	0.18%	2,604	35.57%	7,321
Antrim	2,797	72.56%	1,010	26.20%	48	1.25%	1,787	46.36%	3,855
Arenac	2,175	67.13%	1,057	32.62%	8	0.25%	1,118	34.51%	3,240
Baraga	2,074	56.02%	1,620	43.76%	8	0.22%	454	12.26%	3,702
Barry	7,247	72.06%	2,611	25.96%	199	1.98%	4,636	46.10%	10,057
Bay	17,831	57.55%	13,077	42.21%	73	0.24%	4,754	15.34%	30,981
Benzie	2,178	69.72%	927	29.67%	19	0.61%	1,251	40.04%	3,124
Berrien	26,690	65.77%	13,744	33.87%	145	0.36%	12,946	31.90%	40,579
Branch	7,631	71.52%	2,974	27.88%	64	0.60%	4,657	43.65%	10,669
Calhoun	22,770	58.87%	15,637	40.43%	271	0.70%	7,133	18.44%	38,678
Cass	6,928	68.51%	3,150	31.15%	35	0.35%	3,778	37.36%	10,113
Charlevoix	3,357	66.20%	1,678	33.09%	36	0.71%	1,679	33.11%	5,071
Cheboygan	3,111	64.60%	1,671	34.70%	34	0.71%	1,440	29.90%	4,816
Chippewa	6,057	62.96%	3,522	36.61%	42	0.44%	2,535	26.35%	9,621
Clare	2,878	77.53%	823	22.17%	11	0.30%	2,055	55.36%	3,712
Clinton	8,867	80.33%	2,131	19.31%	40	0.36%	6,736	61.03%	11,038
Crawford	879	65.30%	462	34.32%	5	0.37%	417	30.98%	1,346
Delta	6,084	47.67%	6,653	52.12%	27	0.21%	-569	-4.46%	12,764
Dickinson	5,587	48.76%	5,800	50.62%	72	0.63%	-213	-1.86%	11,459
Eaton	10,836	71.49%	4,222	27.86%	99	0.65%	6,614	43.64%	15,157
Emmet	3,924	68.17%	1,789	31.08%	43	0.75%	2,135	37.09%	5,756
Genesee	43,064	48.28%	45,770	51.32%	360	0.40%	-2,706	-3.03%	89,194
Gladwin	2,585	74.91%	842	24.40%	24	0.70%	1,743	50.51%	3,451
Gogebic	6,411	48.42%	6,765	51.10%	64	0.48%	-354	-2.67%	13,240
Grand Traverse	5,874	72.94%	2,133	26.49%	46	0.57%	3,741	46.45%	8,053
Gratiot	8,504	76.06%	2,581	23.08%	96	0.86%	5,923	52.97%	11,181
Hillsdale	9,802	78.30%	2,594	20.72%	122	0.97%	7,208	57.58%	12,518
Houghton	10,106	52.89%	8,970	46.95%	30	0.16%	1,136	5.95%	19,106
Huron	9,889	83.84%	1,852	15.70%	54	0.46%	8,037	68.14%	11,795
Ingham	40,022	66.08%	20,138	33.25%	407	0.67%	19,884	32.83%	60,567
Ionia	10,065	72.93%	3,606	26.13%	129	0.93%	6,459	46.80%	13,800
Iosco	2,499	72.46%	943	27.34%	7	0.20%	1,556	45.11%	3,449
Iron	4,420	52.87%	3,868	46.27%	72	0.86%	552	6.60%	8,360
Isabella	6,929	77.25%	1,972	21.99%	68	0.76%	4,957	55.27%	8,969
Jackson	24,995	65.06%	13,245	34.47%	180	0.47%	11,750	30.58%	38,420
Kalamazoo	27,255	65.76%	13,636	32.90%	556	1.34%	13,619	32.86%	41,447
Kalkaska	1,064	75.89%	327	23.32%	11	0.78%	737	52.57%	1,402
Kent	59,246	57.45%	43,386	42.07%	494	0.48%	15,860	15.38%	103,126
Keweenaw	925	52.08%	842	47.41%	9	0.51%	83	4.67%	1,776
Lake	1,270	65.80%	653	33.83%	7	0.36%	617	31.97%	1,930
Lapeer	8,078	74.84%	2,653	24.58%	63	0.58%	5,425	50.26%	10,794
Leelanau	2,232	73.79%	784	25.92%	9	0.30%	1,448	47.87%	3,025
Lenawee	17,606	75.75%	5,547	23.87%	89	0.38%	12,059	51.88%	23,242
Livingston	7,713	74.56%	2,580	24.94%	51	0.49%	5,133	49.62%	10,344
Luce	1,386	70.14%	583	29.50%	7	0.35%	803	40.64%	1,976
Mackinac	2,490	66.17%	1,260	33.48%	13	0.35%	1,230	32.69%	3,763
Macomb	24,225	52.58%	21,542	46.75%	308	0.67%	2,683	5.82%	46,075
Manistee	4,588	62.68%	2,704	36.94%	28	0.38%	1,884	25.74%	7,320
Marquette	9,722	49.65%	9,800	50.05%	58	0.30%	-78	-0.40%	19,580
Mason	4,895	65.16%	2,586	34.42%	31	0.41%	2,309	30.74%	7,512
Mecosta	4,455	75.53%	1,383	23.45%	60	1.02%	3,072	52.09%	5,898
Menominee	5,467	57.42%	3,990	41.91%	64	0.67%	1,477	15.51%	9,521
Midland	7,578	73.03%	2,742	26.42%	57	0.55%	4,836	46.60%	10,377
Missaukee	2,069	75.51%	646	23.58%	25	0.91%	1,423	51.93%	2,740
Monroe	15,133	63.80%	8,508	35.87%	79	0.33%	6,625	27.93%	23,720
Montcalm	7,969	74.27%	2,665	24.84%	96	0.89%	5,304	49.43%	10,730
Montmorency	1,091	70.71%	443	28.71%	9	0.58%	648	42.00%	1,543
Muskegon	19,882	51.52%	18,519	47.99%	191	0.49%	1,363	3.53%	38,592
Newaygo	5,740	77.53%	1,630	22.02%	34	0.46%	4,110	55.51%	7,404
Oakland	67,227	57.78%	47,935	41.20%	1,179	1.01%	19,292	16.58%	116,341
Oceana	3,884	72.94%	1,380	25.92%	61	1.15%	2,504	47.02%	5,325
Ogemaw	2,431	74.30%	826	25.24%	15	0.46%	1,605	49.05%	3,272
Ontonagon	2,703	54.06%	2,291	45.82%	6	0.12%	412	8.24%	5,000
Osceola	4,003	77.74%	1,097	21.31%	49	0.95%	2,906	56.44%	5,149
Oscoda	672	71.95%	262	28.05%	0	0.00%	410	43.90%	934
Otsego	1,396	64.54%	756	34.95%	11	0.51%	640	29.59%	2,163
Ottawa	18,293	71.84%	7,011	27.54%	158	0.62%	11,282	44.31%	25,462
Presque Isle	2,482	57.99%	1,789	41.80%	9	0.21%	693	16.19%	4,280
Roscommon	1,374	77.54%	383	21.61%	15	0.85%	991	55.93%	1,772
Saginaw	30,472	60.51%	19,563	38.85%	321	0.64%	10,909	21.66%	50,356
Sanilac	9,938	82.19%	2,073	17.14%	81	0.67%	7,865	65.04%	12,092
Schoolcraft	1,969	60.14%	1,279	39.07%	26	0.79%	690	21.08%	3,274
Shiawassee	12,366	71.77%	4,789	27.79%	75	0.44%	7,577	43.98%	17,230
St. Clair	21,237	69.10%	9,373	30.50%	124	0.40%	11,864	38.60%	30,734
St. Joseph	10,124	71.97%	3,883	27.61%	59	0.42%	6,241	44.37%	14,066
Tuscola	10,244	79.89%	2,495	19.46%	84	0.66%	7,749	60.43%	12,823
Van Buren	11,444	72.25%	4,341	27.41%	55	0.35%	7,103	44.84%	15,840
Washtenaw	27,435	67.65%	12,925	31.87%	194	0.48%	14,510	35.78%	40,554
Wayne	366,461	41.88%	504,581	57.66%	4,077	0.47%	-138,120	-15.78%	875,119
Wexford	4,494	68.67%	1,966	30.04%	84	1.28%	2,528	38.63%	6,544
Total	1,208,859	54.69%	989,307	44.76%	12,080	0.55%	219,552	9.93%	2,210,246

===== Counties that flipped from Democratic to Republican =====
- Keweenaw
- Macomb

===== Counties that flipped from Republican to Democratic =====
- Marquette
