= 1948 Michigan gubernatorial election =

- November 2, 1948
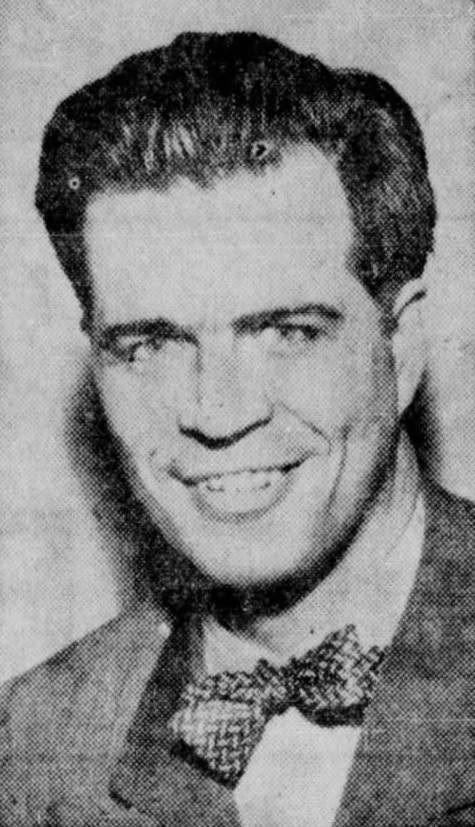

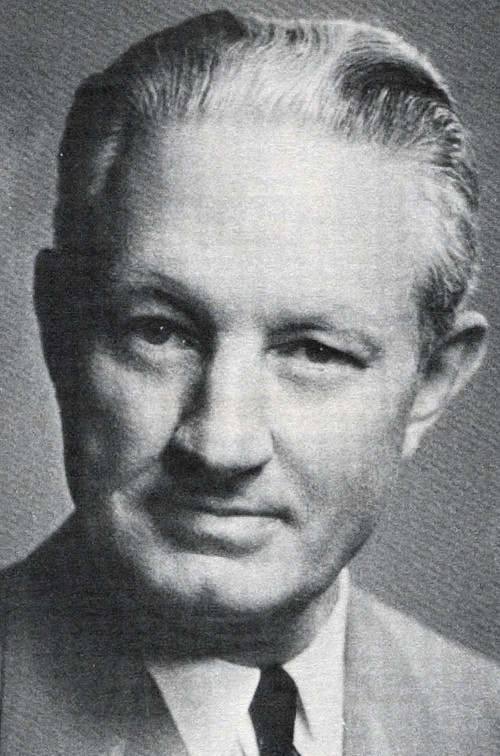
| Nominee | G. Mennen Williams | Kim Sigler |
| Party | Democratic | Republican |
| Popular vote | 1,128,664 | 964,810 |
| Percentage | 53.41% | 45.66% |
- County results Williams: 50–60% 60–70% Sigler: 40–50% 50–60% 60–70% 70–80%
Governor before election
Kim Sigler
Republican
Elected Governor
G. Mennen Williams
Democratic

The 1948 Michigan gubernatorial election was held on November 2, 1948. Democratic nominee G. Mennen Williams defeated incumbent Republican Kim Sigler with 53.41% of the vote.

== Primary election ==
Michigan held primary elections on September 14, 1948.

=== Republican party ===
Incumbent governor Kim Sigler was renominated without opposition.

==== Candidates ====
- Kim Sigler, incumbent governor

==== Results ====
Republican primary results
| Party | Candidate | Votes | % |
|---|---|---|---|
| Republican | Kim Sigler (inc.) | 430,721 | 99.94% |
| Republican | Scattering | 244 | 0.06% |
| Total votes | | 430,965 | 100.00% |

=== Democratic party ===
G. Mennen Williams won the Democratic nomination in a competitive three-way race.

==== Candidates ====
- Burnett J. Abbott, businessman from Albion
- Victor E. Bucknell, attorney from Kalamazoo
- G. Mennen Williams, attorney and member of Michigan Liquor Control Commission

==== Results ====
Democratic primary results
| Party | Candidate | Votes | % |
|---|---|---|---|
| Democratic | G. Mennen Williams | 109,988 | 38.58% |
| Democratic | Victor E. Bucknell | 101,814 | 35.71% |
| Democratic | Burnett J. Abbott | 73,302 | 25.71% |
| Democratic | Scattering | 9 | 0.00% |
| Total votes | | 285,113 | 100.00% |

== General election ==
=== Candidates ===
Major party candidates

- G. Mennen Williams, Democratic
- Kim Sigler, Republican

Other candidates

- Gordon Phillips, Prohibition
- Emanuel Seidler, Socialist
- Arthur Chenoweth, Socialist Labor
- Howard Lerner, Socialist Workers

=== Results ===
1948 Michigan gubernatorial election
| Party | Candidate | Votes | % | ±% |
|---|---|---|---|---|
| Democratic | G. Mennen Williams | 1,128,664 | 53.41% | +14.71% |
| Republican | Kim Sigler (inc.) | 964,810 | 45.66% | −14.62% |
| Prohibition | Gordon Phillips | 15,249 | 0.72% | +0.00% |
| Socialist | Emanuel Seidler | 2,115 | 0.10% | |
| Socialist Labor | Arthur Chenoweth | 1,405 | 0.07% | −0.24% |
| Socialist Workers | Howard Lerner | 870 | 0.04% | |
| | Scattering | 9 | 0.00% | |
| Majority | | 163,854 | 7.75% | |
| Total votes | | 2,113,122 | 100.00% | |
| Democratic gain from Republican | | Swing | +29.33% | |

==== Results by county ====
After this election, Kent County would not vote Democratic again until 1986.

| County | G. Mennen Williams Democratic | | Kim Sigler Republican | | Gordon Phillips Prohibition | | All Others Various | | Margin | | Total votes cast |
| County | # | % | # | % | # | % | # | % | # | % | Total votes cast |
|---|---|---|---|---|---|---|---|---|---|---|---|
| Alcona | 702 | 32.68% | 1,425 | 66.34% | 18 | 0.84% | 3 | 0.14% | -723 | -33.66% | 2,148 |
| Alger | 2,089 | 54.51% | 1,711 | 44.65% | 27 | 0.70% | 5 | 0.13% | 378 | 9.86% | 3,832 |
| Allegan | 5,091 | 33.52% | 9,812 | 64.60% | 264 | 1.74% | 21 | 0.14% | -4,721 | -31.08% | 15,188 |
| Alpena | 2,903 | 40.84% | 4,164 | 58.57% | 36 | 0.51% | 6 | 0.08% | -1,261 | -17.74% | 7,109 |
| Antrim | 1,297 | 34.23% | 2,416 | 63.76% | 70 | 1.85% | 6 | 0.16% | -1,119 | -29.53% | 3,789 |
| Arenac | 1,228 | 41.13% | 1,742 | 58.34% | 12 | 0.40% | 4 | 0.13% | -514 | -17.21% | 2,986 |
| Baraga | 1,950 | 52.83% | 1,730 | 46.87% | 10 | 0.27% | 1 | 0.03% | 220 | 5.96% | 3,691 |
| Barry | 3,128 | 35.75% | 5,318 | 60.78% | 293 | 3.35% | 11 | 0.13% | -2,190 | -25.03% | 8,750 |
| Bay | 15,027 | 53.98% | 12,586 | 45.21% | 173 | 0.62% | 50 | 0.18% | 2,441 | 8.77% | 27,836 |
| Benzie | 1,059 | 34.89% | 1,948 | 64.18% | 22 | 0.72% | 6 | 0.20% | -889 | -29.29% | 3,035 |
| Berrien | 14,566 | 39.88% | 21,672 | 59.34% | 195 | 0.53% | 90 | 0.25% | -7,106 | -19.46% | 36,523 |
| Branch | 3,692 | 36.85% | 6,056 | 60.45% | 260 | 2.60% | 10 | 0.10% | -2,364 | -23.60% | 10,018 |
| Calhoun | 17,182 | 47.62% | 18,410 | 51.02% | 435 | 1.21% | 55 | 0.15% | -1,228 | -3.40% | 36,082 |
| Cass | 3,248 | 35.99% | 5,666 | 62.79% | 83 | 0.92% | 27 | 0.30% | -2,418 | -26.80% | 9,024 |
| Charlevoix | 2,046 | 42.88% | 2,656 | 55.66% | 63 | 1.32% | 7 | 0.15% | -610 | -12.78% | 4,772 |
| Cheboygan | 1,809 | 35.88% | 3,198 | 63.43% | 23 | 0.46% | 12 | 0.24% | -1,389 | -27.55% | 5,042 |
| Chippewa | 3,741 | 42.58% | 4,856 | 55.27% | 177 | 2.01% | 12 | 0.14% | -1,115 | -12.69% | 8,786 |
| Clare | 1,128 | 30.26% | 2,563 | 68.75% | 35 | 0.94% | 2 | 0.05% | -1,435 | -38.49% | 3,728 |
| Clinton | 3,223 | 31.85% | 6,783 | 67.04% | 102 | 1.01% | 10 | 0.10% | -3,560 | -35.18% | 10,118 |
| Crawford | 513 | 38.48% | 819 | 61.44% | 0 | 0.00% | 1 | 0.08% | -306 | -22.96% | 1,333 |
| Delta | 7,393 | 59.60% | 4,967 | 40.04% | 34 | 0.27% | 10 | 0.08% | 2,426 | 19.56% | 12,404 |
| Dickinson | 6,669 | 60.62% | 4,221 | 38.37% | 91 | 0.83% | 20 | 0.18% | 2,448 | 22.25% | 11,001 |
| Eaton | 5,408 | 40.44% | 7,654 | 57.24% | 298 | 2.23% | 12 | 0.09% | -2,246 | -16.80% | 13,372 |
| Emmet | 2,399 | 42.72% | 3,161 | 56.30% | 50 | 0.89% | 5 | 0.09% | -762 | -13.57% | 5,615 |
| Genesee | 54,223 | 63.38% | 30,456 | 35.60% | 740 | 0.87% | 129 | 0.15% | 23,767 | 27.78% | 85,548 |
| Gladwin | 944 | 30.77% | 2,096 | 68.32% | 22 | 0.72% | 6 | 0.20% | -1,152 | -37.55% | 3,068 |
| Gogebic | 7,281 | 58.78% | 5,037 | 40.66% | 56 | 0.45% | 13 | 0.10% | 2,244 | 18.12% | 12,387 |
| Grand Traverse | 2,633 | 33.22% | 5,223 | 65.89% | 62 | 0.78% | 9 | 0.11% | -2,590 | -32.67% | 7,927 |
| Gratiot | 2,939 | 29.25% | 6,857 | 68.25% | 245 | 2.44% | 6 | 0.06% | -3,918 | -39.00% | 10,047 |
| Hillsdale | 3,677 | 34.59% | 6,622 | 62.29% | 327 | 3.08% | 5 | 0.05% | -2,945 | -27.70% | 10,631 |
| Houghton | 7,817 | 46.78% | 8,838 | 52.89% | 46 | 0.28% | 9 | 0.05% | -1,021 | -6.11% | 16,710 |
| Huron | 3,186 | 30.01% | 7,367 | 69.39% | 60 | 0.57% | 4 | 0.04% | -4,181 | -39.38% | 10,617 |
| Ingham | 25,094 | 45.45% | 29,224 | 52.92% | 823 | 1.49% | 77 | 0.14% | -4,130 | -7.48% | 55,218 |
| Ionia | 5,626 | 44.38% | 6,786 | 53.53% | 256 | 2.02% | 10 | 0.08% | -1,160 | -9.15% | 12,678 |
| Iosco | 1,203 | 32.13% | 2,518 | 67.25% | 22 | 0.59% | 1 | 0.03% | -1,315 | -35.12% | 3,744 |
| Iron | 3,948 | 50.02% | 3,835 | 48.59% | 97 | 1.23% | 13 | 0.16% | 113 | 1.43% | 7,893 |
| Isabella | 2,615 | 32.04% | 5,427 | 66.50% | 113 | 1.38% | 6 | 0.07% | -2,812 | -34.46% | 8,161 |
| Jackson | 17,426 | 48.72% | 17,847 | 49.90% | 466 | 1.30% | 25 | 0.07% | -421 | -1.18% | 35,764 |
| Kalamazoo | 18,071 | 43.90% | 22,342 | 54.28% | 657 | 1.60% | 91 | 0.22% | -4,271 | -10.38% | 41,161 |
| Kalkaska | 457 | 36.39% | 776 | 61.78% | 18 | 1.43% | 5 | 0.40% | -319 | -25.40% | 1,256 |
| Kent | 50,812 | 41.50% | 46,736 | 47.37% | 975 | 0.99% | 148 | 0.15% | 4,076 | 4.13% | 98,671 |
| Keweenaw | 798 | 52.81% | 703 | 46.53% | 6 | 0.40% | 4 | 0.26% | 95 | 6.29% | 1,511 |
| Lake | 821 | 35.95% | 1,452 | 63.57% | 9 | 0.39% | 2 | 0.09% | -631 | -27.63% | 2,284 |
| Lapeer | 5,095 | 38.49% | 7,976 | 60.25% | 151 | 1.14% | 16 | 0.12% | -2,881 | -21.76% | 13,238 |
| Leelanau | 843 | 30.04% | 1,951 | 69.53% | 10 | 0.36% | 2 | 0.07% | -1,108 | -39.49% | 2,806 |
| Lenawee | 6,646 | 31.84% | 13,962 | 66.89% | 249 | 1.19% | 17 | 0.08% | -7,316 | -35.05% | 20,874 |
| Livingston | 3,324 | 32.34% | 6,837 | 66.53% | 107 | 1.04% | 9 | 0.09% | -3,513 | -34.18% | 10,277 |
| Luce | 573 | 31.52% | 1,230 | 67.66% | 14 | 0.77% | 1 | 0.06% | -657 | -36.14% | 1,818 |
| Mackinac | 1,258 | 37.54% | 2,076 | 61.95% | 11 | 0.33% | 6 | 0.18% | -818 | -24.41% | 3,351 |
| Macomb | 27,612 | 59.36% | 18,652 | 40.10% | 154 | 0.33% | 101 | 0.22% | 8,960 | 19.26% | 46,519 |
| Manistee | 3,766 | 51.75% | 3,469 | 47.67% | 36 | 0.49% | 6 | 0.08% | 297 | 4.08% | 7,277 |
| Marquette | 9,847 | 52.79% | 8,675 | 46.51% | 114 | 0.61% | 16 | 0.09% | 1,172 | 6.28% | 18,652 |
| Mason | 3,556 | 48.43% | 3,703 | 50.43% | 68 | 0.93% | 16 | 0.22% | -147 | -2.00% | 7,343 |
| Mecosta | 1,835 | 33.64% | 3,496 | 64.09% | 123 | 2.25% | 1 | 0.02% | -1,661 | -30.45% | 5,455 |
| Menominee | 4,970 | 52.10% | 4,490 | 47.07% | 70 | 0.73% | 9 | 0.09% | 480 | 5.03% | 9,539 |
| Midland | 3,771 | 40.08% | 5,513 | 58.59% | 119 | 1.26% | 6 | 0.06% | -1,742 | -18.51% | 9,409 |
| Missaukee | 747 | 30.04% | 1,703 | 68.48% | 36 | 1.45% | 1 | 0.04% | -956 | -38.44% | 2,487 |
| Monroe | 10,974 | 49.64% | 10,978 | 49.66% | 125 | 0.57% | 31 | 0.14% | -4 | -0.02% | 22,108 |
| Montcalm | 3,446 | 37.24% | 5,656 | 61.13% | 142 | 1.53% | 9 | 0.10% | -2,210 | -23.88% | 9,253 |
| Montmorency | 686 | 42.79% | 882 | 55.02% | 32 | 2.00% | 3 | 0.19% | -196 | -12.23% | 1,603 |
| Muskegon | 23,898 | 61.36% | 14,663 | 37.65% | 310 | 0.80% | 74 | 0.19% | 9,235 | 23.71% | 38,945 |
| Newaygo | 2,323 | 35.77% | 4,092 | 63.00% | 65 | 1.00% | 15 | 0.23% | -1,769 | -27.24% | 6,495 |
| Oakland | 58,268 | 49.21% | 59,371 | 50.14% | 529 | 0.45% | 233 | 0.20% | -1,103 | -0.93% | 118,401 |
| Oceana | 1,839 | 38.05% | 2,804 | 58.02% | 185 | 3.83% | 5 | 0.10% | -965 | -19.97% | 4,833 |
| Ogemaw | 1,085 | 34.88% | 1,972 | 63.39% | 52 | 1.67% | 2 | 0.06% | -887 | -28.51% | 3,111 |
| Ontonagon | 2,473 | 50.16% | 2,435 | 49.39% | 14 | 0.28% | 8 | 0.16% | 38 | 0.77% | 4,930 |
| Osceola | 1,386 | 30.61% | 3,012 | 66.52% | 125 | 2.76% | 5 | 0.11% | -1,626 | -35.91% | 4,528 |
| Oscoda | 322 | 29.95% | 747 | 69.49% | 4 | 0.37% | 2 | 0.19% | -425 | -39.53% | 1,075 |
| Otsego | 911 | 40.36% | 1,324 | 58.66% | 19 | 0.84% | 3 | 0.13% | -413 | -18.30% | 2,257 |
| Ottawa | 11,190 | 44.92% | 13,456 | 54.01% | 249 | 1.00% | 17 | 0.07% | -2,266 | -9.10% | 24,912 |
| Presque Isle | 1,703 | 42.03% | 2,341 | 57.77% | 7 | 0.17% | 1 | 0.02% | -638 | -15.75% | 4,052 |
| Roscommon | 760 | 27.87% | 1,955 | 71.69% | 10 | 0.37% | 2 | 0.07% | -1,195 | -43.82% | 2,727 |
| Saginaw | 21,803 | 48.80% | 22,315 | 49.94% | 402 | 0.90% | 161 | 0.36% | -512 | -1.15% | 44,681 |
| Sanilac | 2,449 | 23.33% | 7,779 | 74.12% | 258 | 2.46% | 9 | 0.09% | -5,330 | -50.79% | 10,495 |
| Schoolcraft | 1,565 | 46.94% | 1,733 | 51.98% | 25 | 0.75% | 11 | 0.33% | -168 | -5.04% | 3,334 |
| Shiawassee | 6,483 | 41.21% | 9,010 | 57.27% | 224 | 1.42% | 15 | 0.10% | -2,527 | -16.06% | 15,732 |
| St. Clair | 13,643 | 47.82% | 14,483 | 50.76% | 371 | 1.30% | 34 | 0.12% | -840 | -2.94% | 28,531 |
| St. Joseph | 4,419 | 35.68% | 7,667 | 61.91% | 288 | 2.33% | 10 | 0.08% | -3,248 | -26.23% | 12,384 |
| Tuscola | 3,152 | 28.73% | 7,620 | 69.44% | 187 | 1.70% | 14 | 0.13% | -4,468 | -40.72% | 10,973 |
| Van Buren | 4,120 | 29.85% | 9,538 | 69.10% | 117 | 0.85% | 28 | 0.20% | -5,418 | -39.25% | 13,803 |
| Washtenaw | 15,674 | 40.21% | 23,021 | 59.05% | 222 | 0.57% | 68 | 0.17% | -7,347 | -18.85% | 38,985 |
| Wayne | 540,105 | 63.71% | 303,078 | 35.75% | 2,137 | 0.25% | 2,477 | 0.29% | 237,027 | 27.96% | 847,797 |
| Wexford | 3,082 | 46.18% | 3,469 | 51.98% | 117 | 1.75% | 6 | 0.09% | -387 | -5.80% | 6,674 |
| Total | 1,128,664 | 53.41% | 964,810 | 45.66% | 15,249 | 0.72% | 4,399 | 0.21% | 163,854 | 7.75% | 2,113,122 |

===== Counties that flipped from Republican to Democratic =====
- Baraga
- Bay
- Genesee
- Iron
- Kent
- Keweenaw
- Macomb
- Manistee
- Marquette
- Menominee
- Muskegon
- Ontonagon
- Wayne
