= Charles S. May =

American politician from Michigan (1830–1901)

Charles Sedgwick May

16th Lieutenant Governor of Michigan
- In office January 7, 1863 – January 2, 1865
- Governor: Austin Blair
- Preceded by: Henry T. Backus
- Succeeded by: Ebenezer O. Grosvenor

Personal details
- Born: March 22, 1830 Sandisfield, Massachusetts, U.S.
- Died: March 25, 1901 (aged 71) Gull Lake, Michigan, U.S.
- Resting place: Mountain Home Cemetery, Kalamazoo; Kalamazoo County Michigan, USA
- Party: Republican
- Spouse(s): Cornelia E Myers May; Eliza Edna Dailey May
- Relations: Dwight May (b)
- Children: Charles Frederick May; Gordon Allen May; Cornelia Eliza May; Allen Potter May
- Parent(s): Rockwell May; Celestia E Underwood May
- Profession: Attorney; Politician; Newspaper Editor; Author

Military service
- Branch/service: Union Army
- Years of service: 1861
- Unit: Company K, Second Michigan Infantry
- Battles/wars: American Civil War; Bull Run; Blackburn's Ford

Charles Sedgwick May (March 22, 1830 – March 25, 1901) was an American politician and the 16th lieutenant governor of Michigan.

== Early life ==
May was born in Sandisfield, Massachusetts, and at the age of four moved to Richland, Michigan. He worked there on a farm until the age of fifteen and became a student of the State University (now Western Michigan University) at Kalamazoo. He studied law in Bennington, Vermont and Battle Creek, Michigan and was admitted to the bar in 1854.

From November 1855 to October 1856, May was associate political editor of the Detroit Daily Tribune and its Washington, D. C. correspondent. He commenced the practice of law in Battle Creek, but soon returned to Kalamazoo where he was elected prosecuting attorney in 1860.

May resigned in 1861, and raised Company K, Second Michigan Infantry, the first volunteer company from Kalamazoo, and was commissioned as captain in the Union Army. He participated in several of the early battles, including the battle of Bull Run and Blackburn's Ford. He resigned due to ill health.

== Politics ==
In 1862, May was elected lieutenant governor and served from 1863 to 1865. The following year he was a member of the 1866 Republican state convention. In 1872, he broke party ranks and supported Democrat Horace Greeley for U. S. President against the re-election of Ulysses S. Grant and was a losing Democratic candidate for U. S. Senate in 1876. He then practiced law in Detroit and later returned to practice law in Kalamazoo.

== Retirement and death ==
In 1888, May retired due to ill health and built a country home, “Island View”, overlooking Gull Lake where he wrote several newspaper and magazine articles and several books. He died of heart disease there just three days after his seventy-first birthday. He is interred at Mountain Home Cemetery, Kalamazoo, Kalamazoo County, Michigan, USA.

== Family life ==
May was the son of Rockwell May (1799 - 1895) and Celestia E Underwood May (1800 - 1889). He married Cornelia E Myers about 1851 and after her death in 1852, he married Eliza Edna Dailey in about 1853. They had four children: Charles Frederick, Gordon Allen, Cornelia Eliza, and Allen Potter. His brother Dwight May was elected lieutenant governor in 1867.

Political offices
Preceded by Henry T. Backus	Lieutenant Governor of Michigan; 1863–1865	Succeeded by Ebenezer O. Grosvenor
