= Lieutenant Governor of Michigan =

Lieutenant Governor of the State of Michigan
- Great Seal of the State of Michigan

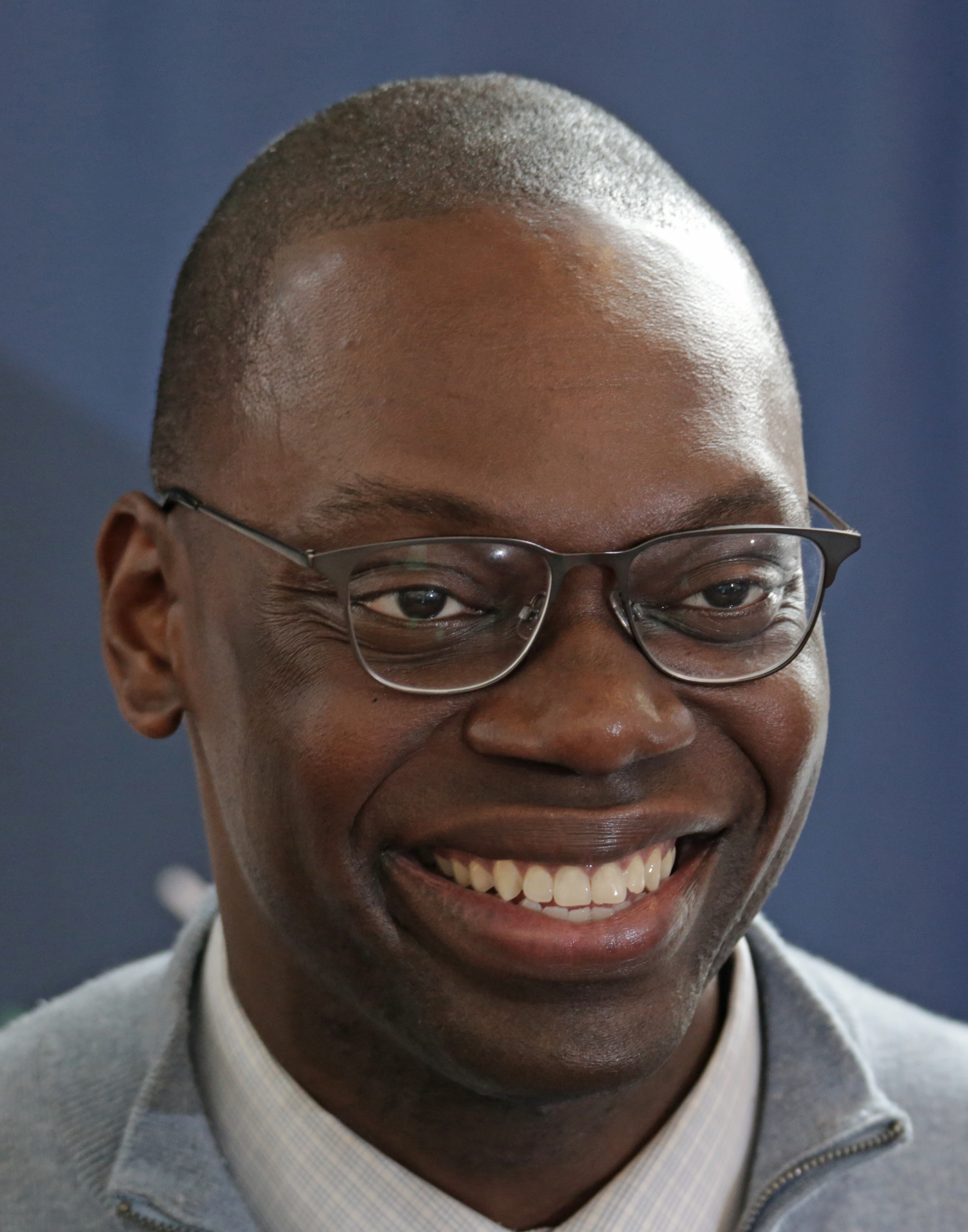
- Incumbent; Garlin Gilchrist since January 1, 2019
- Government of Michigan
- Appointer: Popularly Elected With the Governor
- Term length: 4 years, renewable once
- Inaugural holder: Edward Mundy
- Formation: January 26, 1837
- Succession: First
- Website: michigan.gov/ltgov

President of Senate of the State of Michigan
- Incumbent; Garlin Gilchrist since January 1, 2019
- Appointer: ex officio
- Term length: 4 Years
- Inaugural holder: Edward Mundy
- Formation: January 26, 1837
- Website: michigan.gov/ltgov

The lieutenant governor of Michigan is the second-ranking official in the U.S. state of Michigan, behind the governor.

The current lieutenant governor is Garlin Gilchrist, a Democrat, who has held the office since January 1, 2019.

== Process ==
In Michigan, the governor and lieutenant governor are elected as a ticket to serve a term of four years. The election takes place two years after each presidential election; thus, the next election will take place in November 2026.

=== Nomination ===
Following the August primary election in each gubernatorial election year, the state's two largest political parties convene a state convention and nominate candidates for lieutenant governor, secretary of state and attorney general, among other offices. Because the governor and lieutenant governor are elected as a ticket, the party's gubernatorial nominee usually makes the de facto decision as to whom the party will nominate for lieutenant governor, then convention delegates officially confirm the designation.

Historically, the governor and lieutenant governor were elected separately, leading to occasions where Republicans controlled one office and the Democrats another (as with George Romney and T. John Lesinski). This changed with the Michigan Constitution of 1963.

=== Election and inauguration ===
After the November general election, the governor and lieutenant governor take office on January 1. Thus, the winners of the 2022 election began their term on January 1, 2023.

=== Term limits ===
Like the governor, the lieutenant governor is allowed to serve up to two terms in office.

== Duties ==
There are three main duties assigned to the lieutenant governor:

- to serve as acting governor while the governor is out of state;
- to become governor if the governor is unable to serve due to death, illness or incapacitation; and
- to preside over the Michigan Senate.

These days, the lieutenant governor also acts as an assistant to the governor. When the governor is unable to attend a function, for instance, the lieutenant governor may be sent in place of the governor. The lieutenant governor will also occasionally head blue-ribbon commissions into pressing public policy issues.

As per Article V, section 25, of the Michigan Constitution, the lieutenant governor is able to cast a tie-breaking vote in the state Senate. After the 1970 general election, the state Senate was divided evenly, between 19 Democrats and 19 Republicans. Republicans were able to hold onto control of the state Senate due to the Republican Lt. Governor James H. Brickley's tie-breaking vote.

== List of lieutenant governors ==
The following list is based on that from the 2025–2026 Michigan Manual.

Parties

Democratic (19) Republican (43) Whig (2)

#	Lieutenant Governor	Term in office	Political party	Governor(s)
1	Edward Mundy	1835–1840	Democratic	Stevens T. Mason
2	James Wright Gordon	1840–1841	Whig	William Woodbridge
3	Thomas J. Drake	1841–1842	Whig	James Wright Gordon
4	Origen D. Richardson	1842–1846	Democratic	John S. Barry
5	William L. Greenly	1846–1847	Democratic	Alpheus Felch
6	Charles P. Bush	1847–1848	Democratic	William L. Greenly
7	William M. Fenton	1848–1851	Democratic	Epaphroditus Ransom
7	William M. Fenton	1848–1851	Democratic	John S. Barry
8	Calvin Britain	1852	Democratic	Robert McClelland
9	Andrew Parsons	1853	Democratic	Robert McClelland
10	George Griswold	1853–1854	Democratic	Andrew Parsons
11	George Coe	1855–1858	Republican	Kinsley S. Bingham
12	Edmund Burke Fairfield	1859–1860	Republican	Moses Wisner
13	James M. Birney	1861	Republican	Austin Blair
14	Joseph R. Williams	1861	Republican	Austin Blair
15	Henry T. Backus	1861–1862	Republican	Austin Blair
16	Charles S. May	1863–1864	Republican	Austin Blair
17	Ebenezer O. Grosvenor	1865–1866	Republican	Henry H. Crapo
18	Dwight May	1867–1868	Republican	Henry H. Crapo
19	Morgan Bates	1869–1872	Republican	Henry P. Baldwin
20	Henry H. Holt	1873–1876	Republican	John J. Bagley
21	Alonzo Sessions	1877–1880	Republican	Charles Croswell
22	Moreau S. Crosby	1881–1884	Republican	David Jerome
22	Moreau S. Crosby	1881–1884	Republican	Josiah Begole
23	Archibald Buttars	1885–1886	Republican	Russell A. Alger
24	James H. MacDonald	1887–1889	Republican	Cyrus G. Luce
25	William Ball	1889–1890	Republican	Cyrus G. Luce
26	John Strong	1891–1892	Democratic	Edwin B. Winans
27	J. Wight Giddings	1893–1894	Republican	John T. Rich
28	Alfred Milnes	1895	Republican	John T. Rich
29	Joseph R. McLaughlin	1895–1896	Republican	John T. Rich
30	Thomas B. Dunstan	1897–1898	Republican	Hazen S. Pingree
31	Orrin W. Robinson	1899–1902	Republican	Hazen S. Pingree
31	Orrin W. Robinson	1899–1902	Republican	Aaron T. Bliss
32	Alexander Maitland	1903–1906	Republican	Aaron T. Bliss
32	Alexander Maitland	1903–1906	Republican	Fred M. Warner
33	Patrick H. Kelley	1907–1910	Republican	Fred M. Warner
34	John Q. Ross	1911–1914	Republican	Chase Osborn
34	John Q. Ross	1911–1914	Republican	Woodbridge N. Ferris
35	Luren Dickinson	1915–1920	Republican	Woodbridge N. Ferris
35	Luren Dickinson	1915–1920	Republican	Albert Sleeper
36	Thomas Read	1921–1924	Republican	Alex J. Groesbeck
37	George W. Welsh	1925–1926	Republican	Alex J. Groesbeck
38	Luren Dickinson	1927–1932	Republican	Fred W. Green
38	Luren Dickinson	1927–1932	Republican	Wilber M. Brucker
39	Allen E. Stebbins	1933–1934	Democratic	William Comstock
40	Thomas Read	1935–1936	Republican	Frank Fitzgerald
41	Leo J. Nowicki	1937–1938	Democratic	Frank Murphy
42	Luren Dickinson	1939	Republican	Frank Fitzgerald
Office vacant from March 16, 1939 – November 19, 1940				Luren Dickinson
43	Matilda Dodge Wilson	1940	Republican	Luren Dickinson
44	Frank Murphy	1941–1942	Democratic	Murray Van Wagoner
45	Eugene C. Keyes	1943–1944	Republican	Harry Kelly
46	Vernon J. Brown	1945–1946	Republican	Harry Kelly
47	Eugene C. Keyes	1947–1948	Republican	Kim Sigler
48	John W. Connolly	1949–1951	Democratic	G. Mennen Williams
49	William C. Vandenberg	1951–1952	Republican	G. Mennen Williams
50	Clarence A. Reid	1953–1954	Republican	G. Mennen Williams
51	Philip Hart	1955–1958	Democratic	G. Mennen Williams
52	John Swainson	1959–1960	Democratic	G. Mennen Williams
53	T. John Lesinski	1961–1964	Democratic	John Swainson
53	T. John Lesinski	1961–1964	Democratic	George W. Romney
54	William G. Milliken	1965–1969	Republican	George W. Romney
Office vacant from January 22, 1969 – [?], 1970				William G. Milliken
55	Thomas F. Schweigert	1970	Republican	William G. Milliken
56	James H. Brickley	1971–1974	Republican	William G. Milliken
57	James Damman	1975–1978	Republican	William G. Milliken
58	James H. Brickley	1979–1982	Republican	William G. Milliken
Office vacant from December 27, 1982 – January 1, 1983				William G. Milliken
59	Martha Griffiths	1983–1990	Democratic	James Blanchard
60	Connie Binsfeld	1991–1998	Republican	John Engler
61	Dick Posthumus	1999–2002	Republican	John Engler
62	John D. Cherry	2003–2010	Democratic	Jennifer Granholm
63	Brian Calley	2011–2018	Republican	Rick Snyder
64	Garlin Gilchrist	2019–present	Democratic	Gretchen Whitmer
