= Harry Kelly (politician) =

American judge and politician (1895–1971)

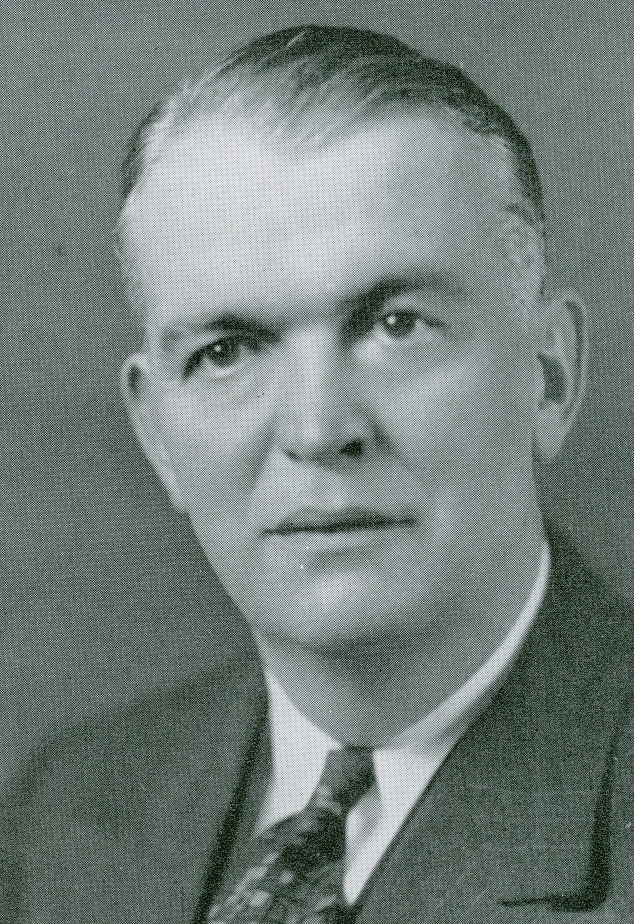

39th Governor of Michigan
- In office January 1, 1943 – January 1, 1947
- Lieutenant: Eugene C. Keyes; Vernon J. Brown
- Preceded by: Murray Van Wagoner
- Succeeded by: Kim Sigler

34th Secretary of State of Michigan
- In office 1939–1943
- Governor: Luren D. Dickinson; Murray Van Wagoner
- Preceded by: Leon D. Case
- Succeeded by: Herman H. Dignan

Personal details
- Born: Harry Francis Kelly; April 19, 1895 Ottawa, Illinois, U.S.
- Died: February 8, 1971 (aged 75) West Palm Beach, Florida, U.S.
- Party: Republican
- Spouse: Anne Veronica O'Brien
- Children: 6 (including Brian Kelly)

Harry Francis Kelly (April 19, 1895 – February 8, 1971) was an American politician. He served as the 39th governor of Michigan from 1943 to 1947.

== Early life ==
Kelly was born in Ottawa, Illinois, one of nine siblings born to Mary Agnes (Morrissey) and Henry Michael Kelly, a lawyer. Both of his parents were Roman Catholics of Irish descent. Kelly spent a year assisting his father in his law office before enrolling at the University of Notre Dame, where he received a law degree from Notre Dame Law School in 1917. He served in the U.S. Army during World War I, was wounded and lost his right leg in the Battle of Chateau-Thierry, where he also earned the Croix de Guerre with palm leaves. Upon his return to the United States, Kelly joined the American Liberty bond drive.

After the war, Kelly established a career in public service. He served as the state's attorney for LaSalle County, Illinois, from 1920 to 1924. During that time, his father moved to Detroit to represent General Motors in Michigan. Harry followed when his term as state's attorney ended, joining his father and younger brother Emmett to form the law firm of Kelly, Kelly, and Kelly.

In 1929, Kelly married Anne Veronica O'Brien, and they had six children together, including actor Brian Kelly. The following year, he became the assistant prosecuting attorney for Wayne County, Michigan, where he served until 1934.

== Politics ==
Kelly was selected by Governor Frank Fitzgerald to head the Detroit area Liquor Control Commission. Fitzgerald later asked him to run for Michigan Secretary of State, which Kelly did. Kelly was elected, serving from 1939 to 1943. When Fitzgerald died suddenly and Lieutenant Governor Luren Dickinson took the governorship, Dickenson turned to Kelly for assistance, and for approximately two years Kelly acted as chief counsel and confidante to Governor Dickinson.

In 1942, the Republican party turned to Kelly as a candidate for governor, and on November 3, 1942, he defeated incumbent Democratic governor Murray Van Wagoner in the general election to become Governor of Michigan. In 1944, while governor, he served as a delegate to the Republican National Convention which nominated Thomas E. Dewey for U.S. president. He was elected to a second two-year term in 1944, and during his four years in office, the state government was reorganized and a grand jury was convened to examine misappropriations in the legislature. Also during his tenure as governor, Kelly appointed Vera Burridge Baits and Roscoe Bonisteel as Regents to the University of Michigan. The War Governor, as he was nicknamed, declined to run for re-election in 1946.

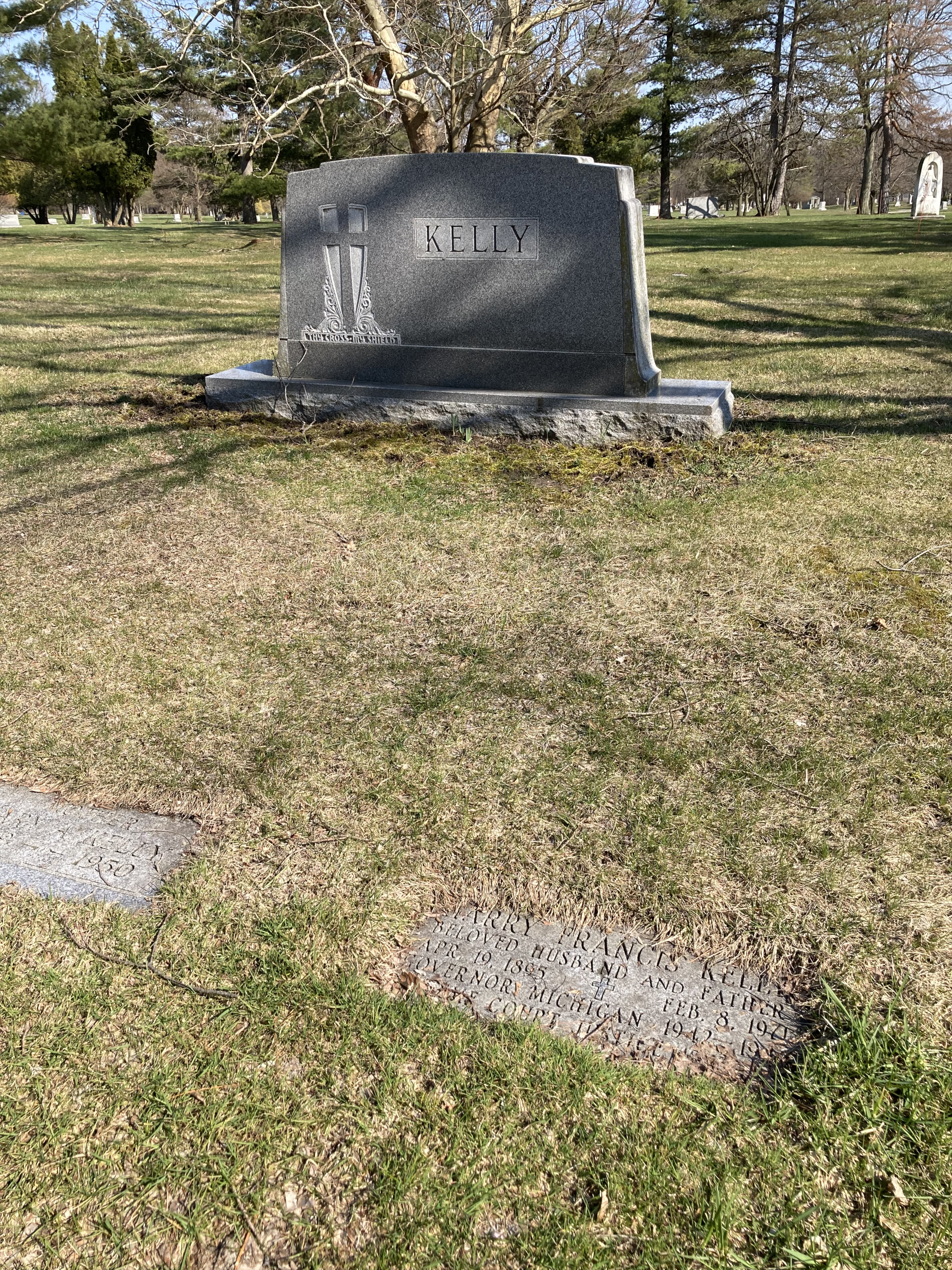
Kelly's grave at Holy Sepulchre Cemetery

After serving out his second term, Kelly returned to private practice until, in 1950, the Republican party again asked him to run for governor again. He lost a close race to Governor G. Mennen Williams, by only 1,154 votes. Kelly was declared the winner in the initial vote count, but Williams requested a recount that found several counting errors and reversed the election's outcome.

In 1954, he was nominated by the Republican party to a seat on the Michigan Supreme Court. He was elected, and served from 1954 to 1971.

== Retirement and death ==
Kelly died at the age of 75 in West Palm Beach, Florida. He is interred at Holy Sepulchre Cemetery in Southfield, Michigan.

A portrait of Governor Kelly, painted by John Coppin, hangs in the rotunda of the Michigan State Capitol.

Party political offices
Preceded by Luren Dickinson	Republican nominee for Governor of Michigan; 1942, 1944	Succeeded by Kim Sigler
Preceded by Kim Sigler	Republican nominee for Governor of Michigan; 1950	Succeeded by Frederick M. Alger Jr.
Political offices
Preceded by Leon D. Case	Michigan Secretary of State; 1939–1943	Succeeded by Herman H. Dignan
Preceded by Murray Van Wagoner	Governor of Michigan; 1943–1947	Succeeded by Kim Sigler
