= Murray Van Wagoner =

American politician

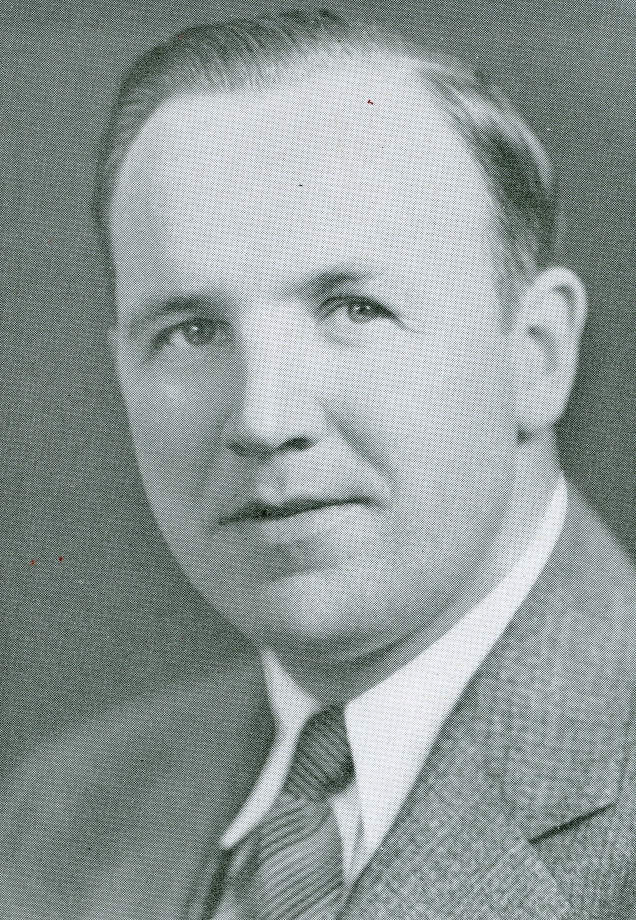

38th Governor of Michigan
- In office January 1, 1941 – January 1, 1943
- Lieutenant: Frank Murphy
- Preceded by: Luren Dickinson
- Succeeded by: Harry Kelly

5th Michigan State Highway Commissioner
- In office June 30, 1933 – December 31, 1940
- Governor: William Comstock; Frank Fitzgerald; Frank Murphy; Frank Fitzgerald; Luren Dickinson
- Preceded by: Grover C. Dillman
- Succeeded by: Donald Kennedy

Personal details
- Born: March 18, 1898 Kingston, Michigan, U.S.
- Died: June 12, 1986 (aged 88) Farmington Hills, Michigan, U.S.
- Party: Democratic
- Spouse: Helen Jossman
- Education: University of Michigan

Murray Delos Van Wagoner (March 18, 1898 – June 12, 1986) was an American politician. A supporter of progressive social and economic legislation, Van Wagoner served as the 38th governor of Michigan from 1941 to 1943.

== Early life ==
Van Wagoner was born near Kingston, Michigan in Tuscola County. In 1921, he received a civil engineering degree from the University of Michigan. He worked for a firm in the private sector, and became the owner of his own company. He married Helen Jossman and they had two children together.

== Politics ==
Van Wagoner served as Oakland County drain commissioner from 1930 until 1933, when he became Michigan State Highway commissioner, a position he held until he was elected governor in 1940. He was a delegate to the Democratic National Conventions in 1936 and 1940, both of which re-nominated Franklin D. Roosevelt for U.S. President.

On November 5, 1940, he defeated the incumbent Republican Governor of Michigan, Luren Dickinson, by 131,281 votes to become Michigan's 38th governor. During his two years in office, he encouraged the construction of road projects and most famously the Mackinac Bridge, the elimination of a 27 million dollar deficit occurred, the state mental hospital was reinstated, a consolidated tax collection department was established, worker strikes involving the auto and electrical industries were dealt with, the reorganization of the Michigan civil service system was initialized, and measures were secured for the war effort.

In 1942, Van Wagoner was unsuccessful for re-election against Republican Harry Kelly. Van Wagoner was a delegate to the Democratic National Convention in 1944, which re-nominated President Roosevelt for his fourth term. In 1946, he ran for governor again and was defeated by Republican Kim Sigler.

In October 1947, General Lucius D. Clay appointed Van Wagoner to the post of military governor of Bavaria, succeeding Brigadier General Walter J. Muller. While military governor, he warned Bavarian Minister-President Hans Ehard against replacing non-Nazi public servants with former Nazis.

Van Wagoner resigned the post in November 1949.

He was a delegate to the 1952 Democratic National Convention, which nominated Adlai Stevenson for President of the United States. Stevenson lost the general election to General Dwight D. Eisenhower.

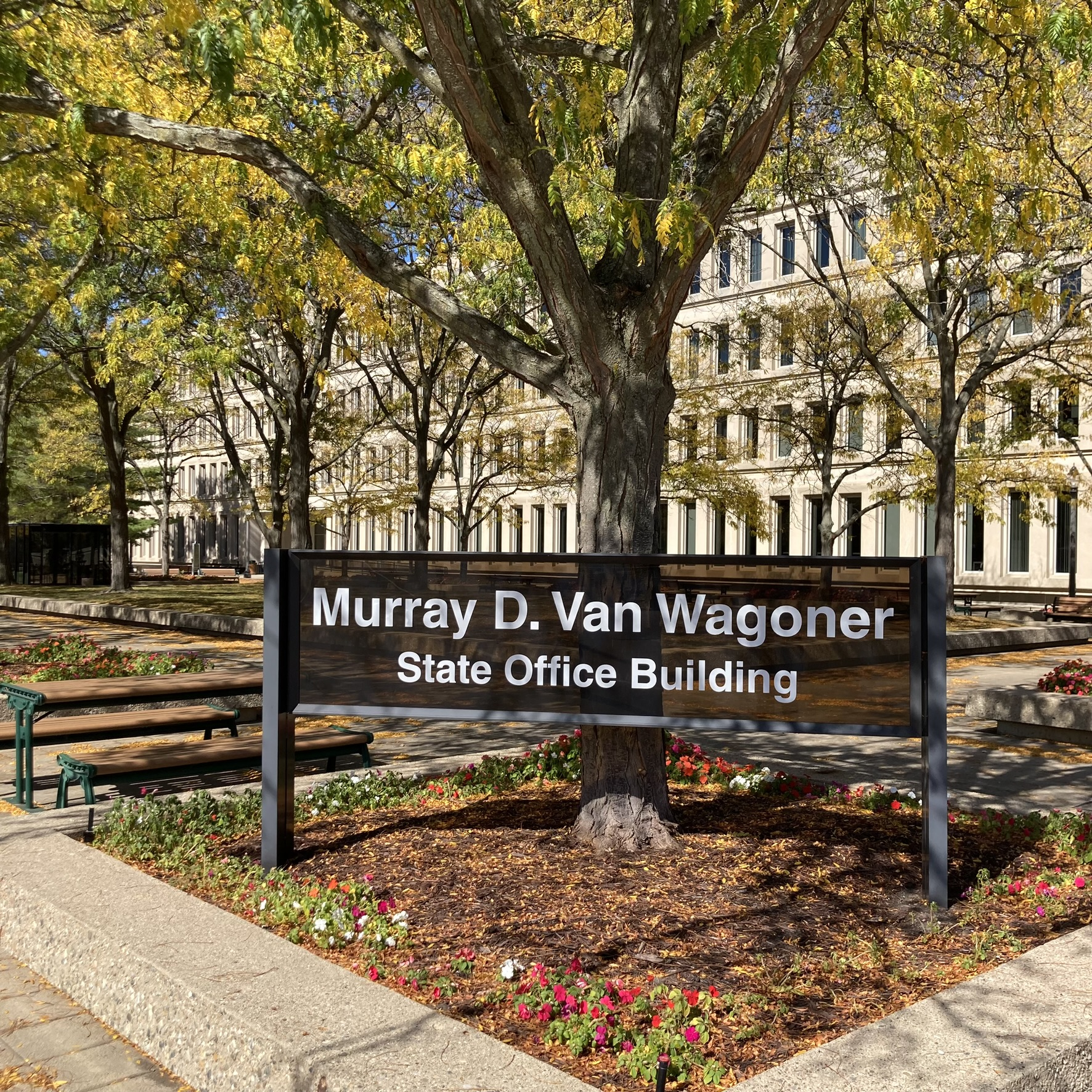
Murray D. Van Wagoner State Office Building in Lansing, Michigan

== Retirement, death and legacy ==
Van Wagoner retired from political life and returned to his engineering interests. He was a member of American Legion, Freemasons, Elks, and the National Exchange Club. He died at the age of 88 in Farmington Hills, Michigan. He is interred at White Chapel Memorial Cemetery in Troy, Michigan.

Today the Michigan Department of Transportation building in Lansing is named after him, The Murray Van Wagoner Transportation Building. A portrait of Governor Van Wagoner, painted by John Coppin, hangs in the rotunda of the Michigan State Capitol.

Party political offices
| Preceded by Frank Murphy | Democratic nominee for Governor of Michigan; 1940, 1942 | Succeeded by Edward J. Fry |
| Preceded by Edward J. Fry | Democratic nominee for Governor of Michigan; 1946 | Succeeded by G. Mennen Williams |
Political offices
| Preceded by Luren Dickinson | Governor of Michigan; 1941–1943 | Succeeded by Harry Kelly |
