= Roscoe Bonisteel =

American lawyer

Roscoe O. Bonisteel
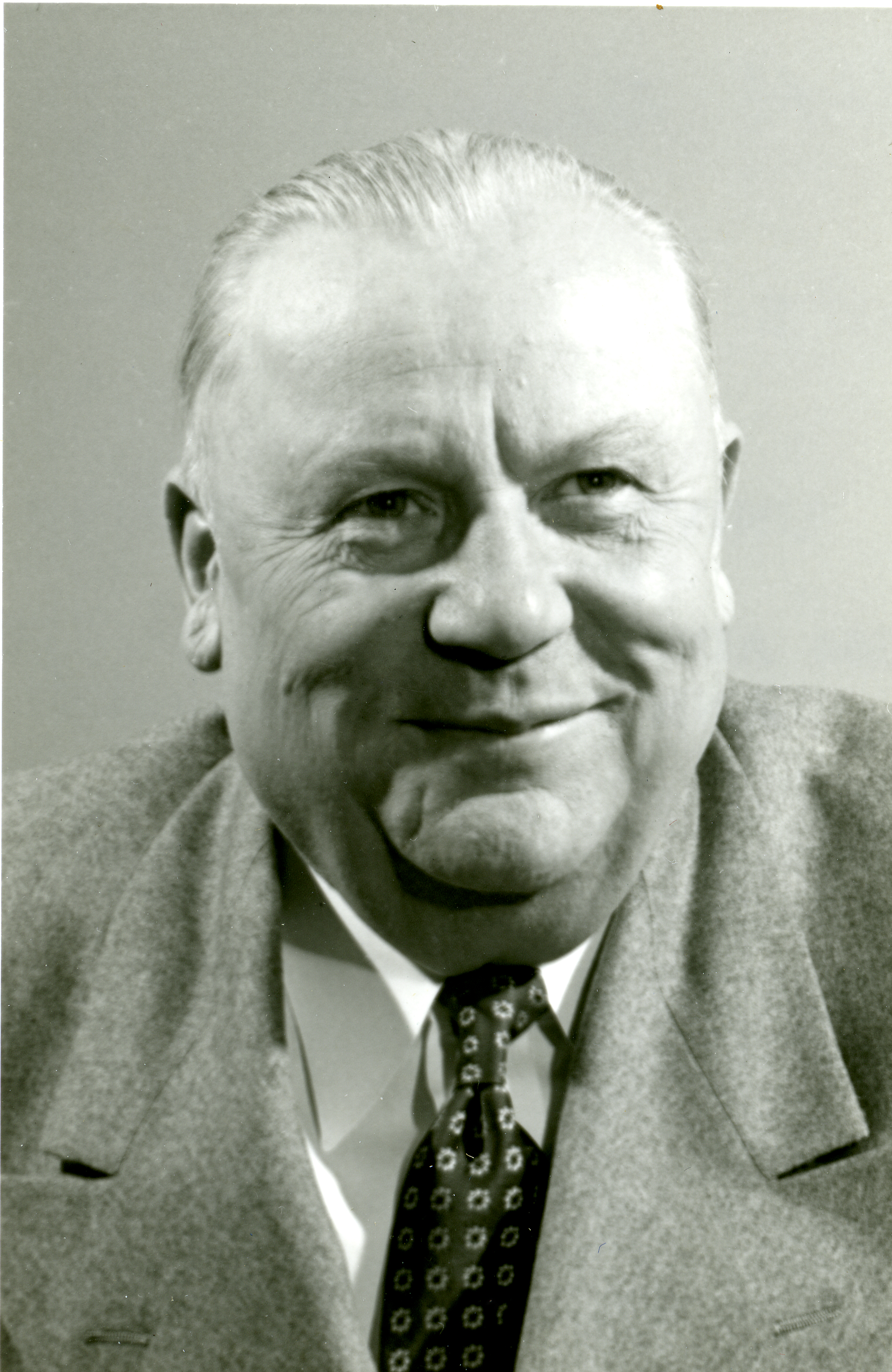

Board of Regents University of Michigan
- In office 1946–1959

Personal details
- Born: December 23, 1888 Sidney Crossing, Ontario
- Died: February 25, 1972 (aged 83) Ann Arbor, Michigan
- Spouse: Lillian
- Children: Jean Ellen (Knecht), Betty Dane (Johnson), Frances Coleman (Fisher), Nancy Ann (Calcutt), and Roscoe Osmond Jr.
- Education: University of Michigan
- Profession: Lawyer

Roscoe Osmond Bonisteel Sr. (December 23, 1888 – February 25, 1972) was an attorney in Ann Arbor, Michigan and a member of the Board of Regents for the University of Michigan from 1946-1959. He served as president of the Michigan State Bar Association from 1936-1937, was on the board of directors and chairman of the executive committee of the National Music Camp at Interlochen. He served on the board of the University Musical Society beginning in 1938. Bonisteel Boulevard on the University of Michigan's North Campus is named in his honor.

== Early life and education ==
Roscoe Osmond Bonisteel was born in Sidney Crossing, Ontario on December 23, 1888, to Milton Freemont and Frances Anna (Whyte) Bonisteel. His father's work with International Harvester brought the family to the United States in 1891. Bonisteel completed his secondary education in New York, Maryland, and Pennsylvania. He spent one year at Dickinson College before transferring to the University of Michigan. There, he completed a LL.B. in 1912. While at Michigan, he served as President of his law class and played on the class football team in 1912.

Bonisteel established a law practice in Ann Arbor and spent most of his life there. For two years, he served in the U.S. Air Service during World War I. He trained as a captain, but the war ended before he finished his training.

== Work ==
For eight years Bonisteel was the city attorney for the City of Ann Arbor. He often dealt with the University of Michigan. He also served numerous other businesses and organizations as an attorney. He served as legal counsel for numerous corporate clients and sat on the boards of directors for several Michigan firms, such as Ann Arbor Ban, Information Industry Associates, Michigan Life Insurance, and the State Bank of Frankfort.

=== UM Regent ===
Michigan Governor Harry F. Kelly appointed Bonisteel to the University of Michigan Board of Regents in 1946, to fill a vacancy left by the death of R. Spencer Bishop, of Flint. In 1952, Bonisteel was elected to a full eight-year term (cite). His time as a Regent coincided with a period of tremendous growth at the university. World War II was over, and students returned to the University in great numbers. Between 1946 and 1958, the enrollment rose from 19,176 to 23,633.

The physical size of the campus also expanded as North Campus was constructed. Bonisteel spearheaded the efforts to purchase the first 267 acres of land for the development. By 1958, eight new buildings had been built on North Campus, as well as the first three units of married and family student housing, Northwood Apartments. Bonisteel also represented the university as a Regent on trips outside of the U.S. In 1954, he traveled with University Vice President Marvin L. Niehus, to visit alumni groups in Taiwan, Tokyo, and Hong Kong (citation). The two men also inspected the Institute of Public Administration of the University of the Philippines.

=== Other organizational leadership ===
Bonisteel was active on numerous boards and committees relating to education, the law and politics. In addition to his extensive time as a Regent for the University of Michigan, he served on the board of trustees of Dickinson College from 1959–1962. In 1956, he was appointed to the Board of Governors of Wayne State University. Bonisteel also served with George Romney as a 1961–1962 delegate to Michigan's Constitutional Convention.

=== Philanthropy ===
He helped establish the "Friends of the Michigan Historical Collections" for the purpose of raising funds for a new building to house those collections. He also provided the Bonisteel Endowment fund to the University of Michigan. The fund supported a variety of University programs and projects including the Wilbur K. Pierpont Fund in the School of Business Administration, the Memorial Law Fund, the Clements Library, and the Bentley Historical Library. Bonisteel also provided substantial funding towards a planetarium at Dickinson College.

== Awards ==
In 1964, the University of Michigan awarded him an honorary Doctor of Laws degree. In 1972, the Board of Regents of the University of Michigan honored Bonisteel's memory by naming the major street through the University of Michigan's North Campus Bonisteel Boulevard.

== Personal life ==
Bonisteel married Lillian (Coleman) Rudolph in 1914. They had five children: Jean Ellen (Knecht), Betty Dame (Johnson), Frances Coleman (Fisher), Nancy Ann (Calcutt), and Roscoe Osmond Jr.
