= William Hale (Michigan politician) =

American politician

Michigan Attorney General
- In office 1851–1854
- Governor: John S. Barry; Robert McClelland; Andrew Parsons
- Preceded by: George V. N. Lothrop
- Succeeded by: Jacob M. Howard

Member of the Michigan Senate from the 1st district
- In office January 1, 1845 – 1846

Personal details
- Born: 1809 Oneida County, New York
- Died: 1874 (aged 64-65) California
- Party: Democratic
- Spouse: Susan
- Children: 4

William Hale (1809 – 1874) was a Michigan politician and attorney.

== Early life ==
Hale was born in 1809 in Oneida County, New York.

== Career ==
In 1836, Hale moved to Detroit, Michigan, where he was admitted to the bar that same year. Hale was first elected as a member of the Michigan Senate from the 1st district on November 4, 1844. He served in this position from January 6, 1845 to 1846. Hale then served as a prosecuting attorney from 1846 to 1849. Hale was the Michigan Attorney General from 1851 to 1854. In 1856, Hale was a delegate to Democratic National Convention from Michigan.

== Personal life ==
Hale was married to Susan. Together they had four children.

== Death ==
Hale moved to San Francisco, California in 1862. He died in California in 1874.

Legal offices
Preceded by George V. N. Lothrop	Michigan Attorney General; 1851–1854	Succeeded by Jacob M. Howard
