= Henry N. Walker =

American politician

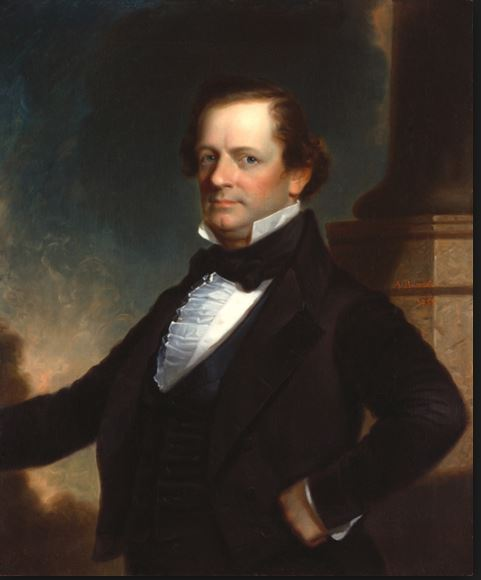

Michigan Attorney General
- In office 1845–1847
- Governor: John S. Barry; Alpheus Felch
- Preceded by: Elon Farnsworth
- Succeeded by: Edward Mundy

Member of the Michigan House of Representatives from the Wayne County district
- In office January 1, 1844 – 1844

Personal details
- Born: November 30, 1811 Fredonia, New York, US
- Died: February 24, 1886 (aged 74)
- Party: Democratic
- Spouse: Emily Virginia Norvell
- Children: 3

Henry Nelson Walker (November 30, 1811 – February 24, 1886) was a Michigan politician.

== Early life ==
Walker was born on November 30, 1811, in Fredonia, New York, to John and Nancy Walker. Walker moved to Detroit in 1835.

== Career ==
In Fredonia, New York, Walker graduated from an academy, and then started to practice law. On November 6, 1843, Walker was elected as a member of the Michigan House of Representatives from the Wayne County district. He served in this position in 1844. Walker served as Michigan Attorney General from 1845 to 1847. Walker served as the postmaster of Detroit from 1859 to 1860.

== Personal life ==
Walker was married to Emily Virginia Norvell, daughter of United States Senator John Norvell. Together, they had three children. Walker was Episcopalian.

== Death ==
Walker died on February 24, 1886.

Legal offices
Preceded by Elon Farnsworth	Michigan Attorney General; 1845–1847	Succeeded by Edward Mundy
