= George Griswold =

American politician

George R. Griswold

10th Lieutenant Governor of Michigan
- In office March 8, 1853 – January 1855
- Governor: Andrew Parsons
- Preceded by: Andrew Parsons
- Succeeded by: George Coe

Member of the Michigan Senate
- In office 1848–1849; 1853

Personal details
- Born: December 31, 1794 New York, U.S.
- Died: April 5, 1857 (aged 62) on board the USS Dolphin off the African coast
- Resting place: Forest Home Cemetery; Milwaukee, Wisconsin
- Profession: Lawyer; Newspaper Publisher; Politician

Military service
- Branch/service: United States Navy
- Years of service: 1855-1857
- Rank: Purser

George R. Griswold (December 31, 1794 – April 5, 1857) was an American politician and the tenth lieutenant governor of Michigan. Griswold was born in the U.S. state of New York and later moved to Detroit, Michigan and practiced law. Griswold died on board USS Dolphin off the African coast just over two years after leaving office.

== Career ==
Griswold served as clerk of the first Michigan House of Representatives in 1835. He was register of deeds from 1837 to 1841 and clerk of Wayne County from 1843 to 1847. In 1839 he became owner and publisher of the Detroit Morning Post, and he became State Printer. He later served in the Michigan Senate from Detroit (1st District) from 1848 until 1849 and again in 1853 when he served as president pro tempore.

On March 8, 1853, Michigan Governor Robert McClelland resigned to become Secretary of the Interior under Franklin Pierce. As a result, Lieutenant Governor Andrew Parsons became Governor and Griswold became the tenth Lieutenant Governor and served from 1853 to 1854. On September 16 of that year he was appointed a purser in the U. S. Navy. He served as acting lieutenant governor until George Coe was elected and then took his place in January 1855.

Political offices
Preceded by Andrew Parsons	Lieutenant Governor of Michigan; 1853–1855	Succeeded by George Coe
