= Edward Mundy =

American judge (1794–1851)

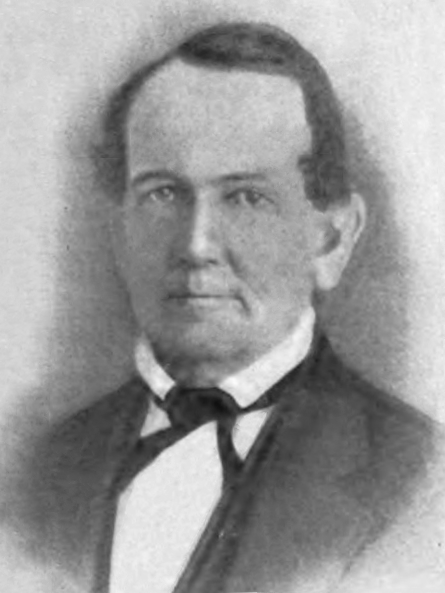

1st Lieutenant Governor of Michigan
- In office November 3, 1835 – January 7, 1840
- Governor: Stevens T. Mason
- Succeeded by: James Wright Gordon

9th Justice of the Michigan Supreme Court
- In office April 4, 1848 – May 13, 1851
- Appointed by: Epaphroditus Ransom
- Succeeded by: George Martin

Attorney General of Michigan
- In office 1847–1848
- Governor: William L. Greenly
- Preceded by: Henry N. Walker
- Succeeded by: George V. N. Lothrop

Personal details
- Born: April 14, 1794 Middlesex County, New Jersey, U.S.
- Died: May 13, 1851 (aged 57) Grand Rapids, Michigan, U.S.
- Resting place: Fulton Street Cemetery; Grand Rapids, Michigan, U.S.
- Party: Democratic
- Spouse: Sarah Mundy
- Children: Phinehas Mundy; Abby Rowland Mundy; Elizabeth Lennington Mundy; Julia Thompson Mundy; James Edward Mundy
- Parent(s): Samuel Munday; Abigail Rowland Mundy
- Education: Rutgers College
- Profession: Lawyer; Politician

Edward Mundy (April 14, 1794 – May 13, 1851) was an American politician and judge from the U.S. state of Michigan, and served as its first lieutenant governor.

== Early life ==
Mundy was born in Middlesex County, New Jersey, and graduated from Rutgers College in 1812. He was admitted to the bar and began a practice in New Jersey.

== Career ==
In about 1819, Mundy moved to Illinois and remained there several years, until the losses he experienced due to a fire caused him to return to New Jersey, where he continued for some years in other business pursuits. In 1831, he moved with his family to Ann Arbor, Michigan. He was appointed Justice of the Peace by the Territorial Governor and was subsequently made a Judge of one of the Territorial Courts. In 1835, he was a delegate from the 4th district to the first State Constitutional Convention to prepare for the admission of the State to the Union.

Mundy was nominated to the office of Lieutenant Governor on the ticket with Governor Stevens T. Mason. They both won the general election, and he served as Michigan's first Lieutenant Governor, from 1835 to 1840.

Appointed by Governor William L. Greenly and the Michigan Senate to the office of Prosecuting Attorney, Mundy went on that year to serve as Michigan Attorney General. In 1848, the Michigan Supreme Court was expanded to include a fifth justice and a new judicial circuit, which were presided over by Supreme Court judges. Mundy was appointed the Supreme Court and to the new circuit and was a justice of the Michigan Supreme Court until his death.

Mundy also served for several years as one of the appointed Regents of the University of Michigan.

== Death ==
Mundy died while in office, in Grand Rapids, Kent County, Michigan, on May 13, 1851 (age 57 years, 29 days). The place of his interment is in Fulton Street Cemetery.

== Family life ==
The son of Samuel and Abigail Mundy, he married Sarah Mundy, daughter of Phinehas Mundy, on November 11, 1816. They had five children, Phinehas, Abby Rowland, Elizabeth Lennington, Julia Thompson, and James Edward.

Political offices
| New office | Lieutenant Governor of Michigan; 1835–1840 | Succeeded by J. Wright Gordon |
Legal offices
| Preceded by Henry N. Walker | Michigan Attorney General; 1847–1848 | Succeeded by George V. N. Lothrop |
