= Governor Gordon =

Governor Gordon may refer to:

- James Wright Gordon (1809–1853), 3rd Governor of Michigan
- John Brown Gordon (1832–1904), 53rd Governor of Georgia
- Mark Gordon (born 1957), 33rd Governor of Wyoming
- Patrick Gordon (governor) (died 1736), Acting Governor of the Province of Pennsylvania
- Walter A. Gordon (1894–1976), 18th Governor of the United States Virgin Islands
