= Charles P. Bush =

American politician (1809–1857)

6th Lieutenant Governor of Michigan
- In office 1847–1848
- Preceded by: William L. Greenly
- Succeeded by: William M. Fenton

Personal details
- Party: Democratic

Charles P. Bush (March 18, 1809 – 1857) was a politician from the U.S. state of Michigan who served as the state's 6th Lieutenant Governor from 1847 to 1848.

== Biography ==
Bush was born in Ithaca, New York.

Bush moved to Michigan in 1836, becoming one of the first residents of Handy.

He was elected as a Democrat to the Michigan House of Representatives in 1840 and served until 1843. In 1844, he was a Presidential elector for Michigan, voting for James K. Polk, who became U.S. President. In 1846, he was elected to the Michigan Senate and the following year served as president pro tempore of the State Senate. In 1847, when Governor Alpheus Felch resigned to serve in the U.S. Senate, Bush became the sixth lieutenant governor of Michigan serving under Governor William L. Greenly from March 4, 1847, to January 3, 1848. In 1847, he also cast the deciding vote to move the state capital from Detroit to Lansing.

Bush soon moved to Lansing and was elected to the state constitutional convention in 1850. Two years later he was a delegate to the 1852 Democratic National Convention, which nominated Franklin Pierce for U. S. President. In 1855, he was elected as state senator from Shiawassee and Ingham counties. He drafted the bill which abolished capital punishment in Michigan.

Bush owned a 1,700-acre (6.9 km^{2}) farm in Livingston County.

He died in Lansing in 1857 at approximately 47 years of age after suffering years of illness.

Political offices
Preceded by William L. Greenly	Lieutenant Governor of Michigan; 1847–1848	Succeeded by William M. Fenton
