= Governor Bingham =

Governor Bingham may refer to:

- Hiram Bingham III (1875–1956), 69th Governor of Connecticut
- Kinsley S. Bingham (1808–1861), 11th Governor of Michigan
