= George V. N. Lothrop =

American politician (1817–1897)

George Van Ness Lothrop
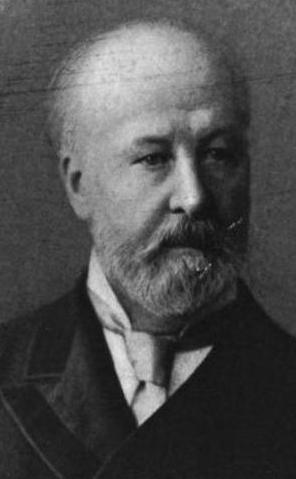

Michigan Attorney General
- In office 1848–1851
- Governor: Epaphroditus Ransom; John S. Barry
- Preceded by: Edward Mundy
- Succeeded by: William Hale

Personal details
- Born: August 8, 1817 Easton, Massachusetts, U.S.
- Died: July 12, 1897 (aged 79) Detroit, Michigan, U.S.
- Resting place: Elmwood Cemetery, Detroit
- Party: Democrat
- Relatives: Edwin H. Lothrop, brother
- Education: Brown University

George Van Ness Lothrop (August 8, 1817 – July 12, 1897) was a politician in the U.S. state of Michigan, serving as the seventh Michigan Attorney General from 1848 until 1851 and US ambassador to Russia.

== Biography ==
Lothrop was born in Easton, Massachusetts, the son of Howard Lothrop and Sally (Williams) Lothrop. George grew up on the family farm in Easton. George's sister Sarah married Oliver Ames Jr., a railroad industrialist.

George studied for one year at Amherst College, and graduated from Brown University in 1838. He started law school at Harvard College, but didn't finish due to ill health. He was a member of Alpha Delta Phi and Phi Beta Kappa.

He moved to live on his brother Edwin's farm in Prairie Ronde, Michigan, to recover.

In 1843, Lothrop moved to Detroit to finish his law studies, and found success as a lawyer. Lothrop was married in 1847 to Almira Strong of Rochester, New York.

Lothrop was a candidate for U.S. Representative from Michigan's 1st congressional district, losing to Republican William Alanson Howard in 1856 and to Bradley F. Granger in 1860. He was a delegate to the Democratic National Convention from Michigan in 1860 and a delegate to the Michigan State Constitutional convention in 1867 (which did not produce a constitution approved by the voters). Lothrop served as U.S. Minister to Russia from 1885 to 1888.

He died on July 12, 1897, in Detroit of hyperthermia. He is interred Elmwood Cemetery in Detroit.

== Family ==
Lothrop's brother, Edwin H. Lothrop, was Speaker of the Michigan State House of Representatives in 1844. Lothrop's daughter, Emily Anne "Nan" Lothrop (1860–1927), married Baron Barthold Theodorevitch von Hoyningen-Huene (1859–1942), a Baltic nobleman and military officer, and their son was the noted fashion photographer George Hoyningen-Huene. His daughter Elizabeth, a noted fashion designer, His brother-in-law, Oliver Ames Jr., was affiliated with the Union Pacific Railroad.

== Memorials ==
A Michigan historical marker on Charlevoix Avenue in Grosse Pointe Farms, Michigan, commemorates a stand of pine trees that Lothrop planted on the site in 1878. These trees became the "feeder stock" for many of the pine groves that are now widespread in the eastern suburbs of Detroit. The street just across Charlevoix Avenue from the pine plantation is named Lothrop Road in his honor.

Legal offices
Preceded by Edward Mundy	Michigan Attorney General; 1848–1851	Succeeded by William Hale
