= Jacob M. Howard =

American attorney and politician (1805–1871)

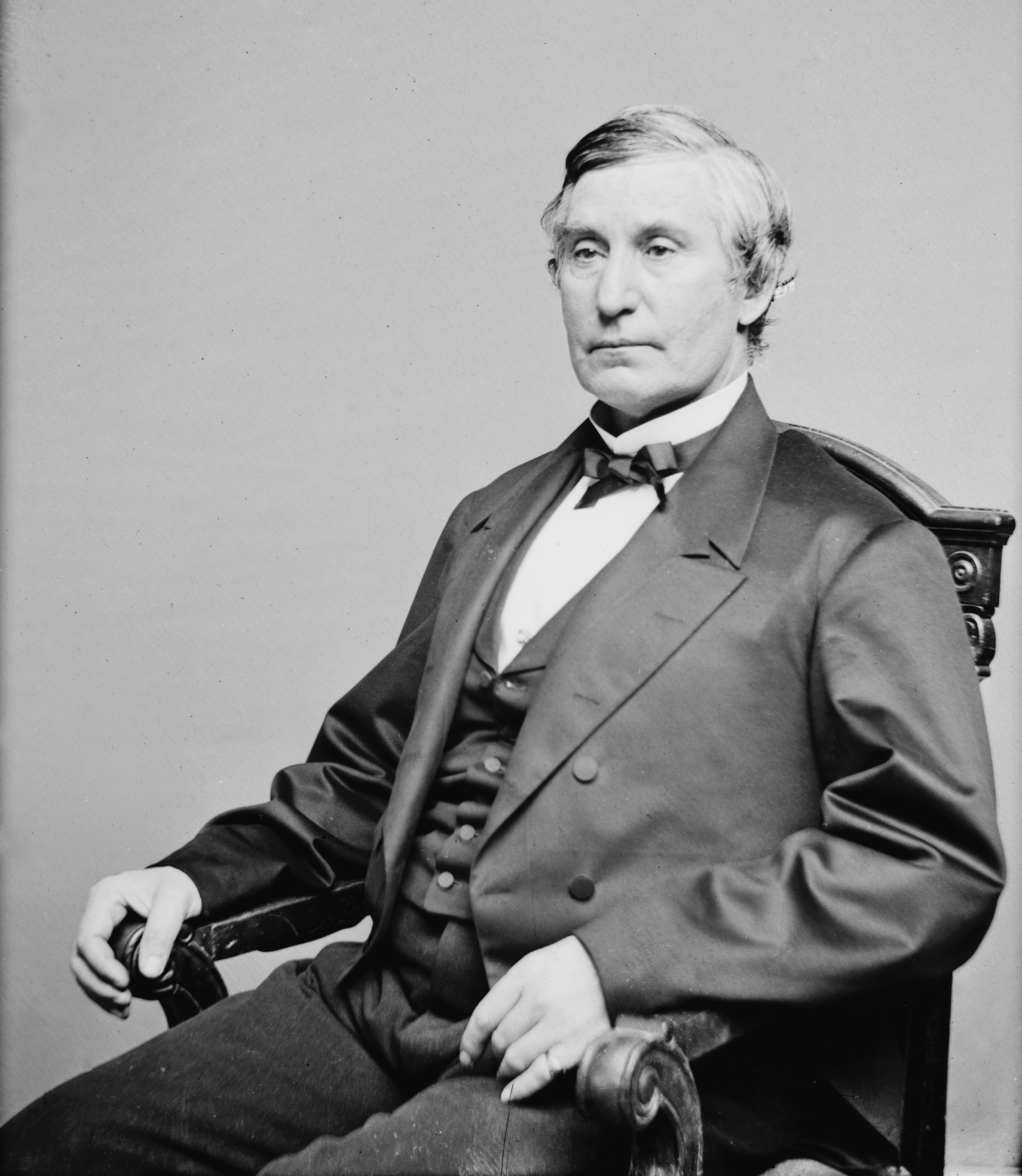

United States Senator from Michigan
- In office January 17, 1862 – March 3, 1871
- Preceded by: Kinsley S. Bingham
- Succeeded by: Thomas W. Ferry

Attorney General of Michigan
- In office 1855–1860
- Governor: Kinsley S. Bingham; Moses Wisner
- Preceded by: William Hale
- Succeeded by: Charles Upson

Member of the U.S. House of Representatives from Michigan's at-large district
- In office March 4, 1841 – March 3, 1843
- Preceded by: Isaac E. Crary
- Succeeded by: Robert McClelland

Member of the Michigan House of Representatives from the Wayne County district
- In office 1838

Personal details
- Born: Jacob Merritt Howard; July 10, 1805 Shaftsbury, Vermont
- Died: April 2, 1871 (aged 65) Detroit, Michigan
- Resting place: Elmwood Cemetery, Detroit, Michigan
- Party: Whig (before 1854); Republican (after 1854)
- Spouse: Catherine Amelia Shaw (1810–1866) (m. 1835–1866)
- Children: 7
- Education: Williams College
- Profession: Attorney

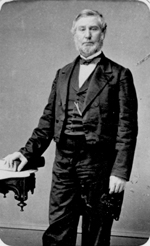
Mr. Howard

Jacob Merritt Howard (July 10, 1805 – April 2, 1871) was an American attorney and politician. He was most notable for his service as a U.S. representative and U.S. senator from the state of Michigan, and his political career spanned the American Civil War.

Howard was a native of Shaftsbury, Vermont, and attended schools in southern Vermont before attending Williams College, from which he graduated in 1830. He studied law, moved to Detroit in 1832, and attained admission to the bar in 1833. Howard practiced in Detroit and became active in politics, first as a Whig, and later as a Republican. Among the offices he held were city attorney (1834) and member of the Michigan House of Representatives (1838). In 1840 he was elected to the U.S. House, and he served one term, 1841 to 1843. In 1854 he was one of the founders of the Republican Party, and he served as Michigan Attorney General from 1855 to 1861.

After Senator Kinsley S. Bingham died in 1861, Howard was elected to fill the vacancy, taking office in January 1862. He was elected to a full term in 1865, and served until March 1871. From 1863 to 1871, Howard was chairman of the Senate's Committee on Pacific Railroads.

Howard died April 2, 1871, a month after the expiration of his final Senate term. He was buried at Elmwood Cemetery in Detroit.

== Early life ==
Howard was born in Shaftsbury, Vermont, on July 10, 1805, the son of farmer Otis Howard and Mary "Polly" Millington. He attended the district schools and the academies of Bennington and Brattleboro. Howard graduated from Williams College in 1830 and was a member of Phi Beta Kappa. He then studied law with attorney Homer Bartlett of Ware, Massachusetts. He moved to Detroit, Michigan, in 1832, completed his legal studies with Charles Larned, was admitted to the bar in 1833 and commenced practice in Detroit.

== Career ==
=== Beginnings ===
Howard was city attorney of Detroit in 1834 and joined the unofficial militia Governor Stevens T. Mason formed for the Toledo War in 1835–1836. Howard served as a member of the Michigan House of Representatives in 1838, representing Wayne County as a Whig.

Howard was elected as a Whig to the US House of Representatives for the 27th Congress, serving from March 4, 1841, to March 3, 1843. He was not a candidate for renomination in 1842, and resumed practicing law in Detroit. Howard became identified with the anti-slavery wing of the Whig Party, and campaigned for presidential nominees Henry Clay (1844), Zachary Taylor (1848), and Winfield Scott (1852).

Convinced after the 1852 election that the Whig Party was no longer a viable organization for abolitionists, he helped draw up the platform of the first Republican Party convention, held in Jackson, Michigan, in 1854. According to several sources, it was Howard who chose the name "Republican" for the new party. Howard was the first Republican nominee for Michigan Attorney General. He was elected and served from 1855 to 1861.

Howard was widely read in the classics, history, law, and literature, and published the memoirs of the Empress Joséphine after translating them from the original French.

=== U.S. Senator ===
Howard was elected as a Republican to the US Senate in 1861 to fill the vacancy caused by the death of Kinsley S. Bingham. In November 1861, Abraham Lincoln nominated him to serve as Minister to Honduras, but he declined so he could continue to serve in the Senate. He was re-elected in 1865 and served from January 1862 to March 1871. He was chairman of the Committee on Pacific Railroads in the 38th through 41st congresses. In addition, he was an active member of the Judiciary, Military Affairs and Private Land Claims Committees.

As a Senator, he was the chief sponsor of the False Claims Act, the "Lincoln Law", which permitted whistleblowers to file qui tam lawsuits against government contractors for fraud, with the incentive of receiving a monetary reward based on the recovery made by the federal government. Howard justified giving rewards to whistleblowers, many of whom had engaged in unethical activities themselves:

I have based the [qui tam provision] upon the old-fashioned idea of holding out a temptation, and 'setting a rogue to catch a rogue,' which is the safest and most expeditious way I have ever discovered of bringing rogues to justice.

Howard is credited with working closely with Abraham Lincoln in drafting and passing the Thirteenth Amendment, which abolished slavery. In the Senate, he also served on the Joint Committee on Reconstruction, which drafted the Fourteenth Amendment.

In the Senate, Howard opposed presidential Reconstruction, arguing that Congress should play the lead role. He authored the final report on President Andrew Johnson's removal of Edwin M. Stanton as Secretary of War, which led to Johnson's impeachment.

== Speech on the proposed 14th Amendment ==
During the debate over the first clause of the Fourteenth Amendment, Howard argued for including the phrase "and subject to the jurisdiction thereof:"

...[E]very person born within the limits of the United States, and subject to their jurisdiction, is by virtue of natural law and national law a citizen of the United States. This will not, of course, include persons born in the United States who are foreigners, aliens, who belong to the families of ambassadors or foreign ministers accredited to the government of the United States, but will include every other class of person.

Howard clarified his statement during the original congressional debate over the amendment describing the clause as having the same content, despite different wording, as the earlier Civil Rights Act of 1866, which reads: “all persons born in the United States and not subject to any foreign power, excluding Indians not taxed, are hereby declared to be citizens of the United States”. He said of the exclusion of Native Americans who maintain their tribal ties:

I am not yet prepared to pass a sweeping act of naturalization by which all the Indian savages, wild or tame, belonging to a tribal relation, are to become my fellow-citizens and go to the polls and vote with me.

According to historian Glenn W. LaFantasie of Western Kentucky University, "A good number of his fellow senators supported his view of the citizenship clause." Senator Reverdy Johnson said in the debate:

Now, all this amendment provides is, that all persons born in the United States and not subject to some foreign Power—for that, no doubt, is the meaning of the committee who have brought the matter before us—shall be considered as citizens of the United States ... If there are to be citizens of the United States entitled everywhere to the character of citizens of the United States, there should be some certain definition of what citizenship is, what has created the character of citizen as between himself and the United States, and the amendment says citizenship may depend upon birth, and I know of no better way to give rise to citizenship than the fact of birth within the territory of the United States, born of parents who at the time were subject to the authority of the United States.

=== Later interpretation ===
During the first Trump administration's debates over immigration policy, Trump supporters including Michael Anton, who advocate for restrictions on immigration, used the quote to claim that Howard did not intend for the amendment to apply to children born in the U.S. of foreign parents.

In response, Ho and Wydra argued that a close reading of Howard's statement reveals that he meant one class of persons, the children of ambassadors at posts in the United States at the time their children were born because ambassadors to the U.S. would be foreigners, and since they were not permanent residents, they were aliens. In their view, Howard was describing one class, not three—the children born of ambassadors and foreigners and aliens.

== Personal life ==
=== Family ===
In 1835, Howard married Catherine Amelia Shaw (1810–1866) of Ware, Massachusetts. They were the parents of seven children: Edward Wellington, who died at age 3; Catherine Amelia, died at age 5; Mary Elizabeth, the wife of Dr. Joseph S. Hildreth; Colonel Jacob Merritt Jr., a Union Army veteran originally with the 24th Michigan Infantry Regiment of the Iron Brigade before becoming an aide and after the war became a businessman in Litchfield, Minnesota; Hamilton Gay, a lawyer in San Francisco; Charles Millington, a mining engineer in Salt Lake City; and Jennie, the wife of Samuel Brady, a grandson of Hugh Brady.

=== Death ===
Howard died in Detroit on April 2, 1871, soon after his final Senate term expired. According to published accounts, he overexerted himself while helping take down a tree on the property line between his house and his neighbor's, and burst a blood vessel in his brain, which caused his death two days later. He was buried at Elmwood Cemetery in Detroit.

== Honors ==
In 1866, Howard received the honorary degree of LL.D. from Williams College. In 1954, a historic marker commemorating Howard's career was placed on the lawn of the Baptist church in Shaftsbury, which later became the home of the Shaftsbury Historical Society.

U.S. House of Representatives
Preceded by Isaac E. Crary	United States Representative from Michigan's at-large congressional district 1841–1843	Succeeded by Robert McClelland
Legal offices
Preceded by William Hale	Michigan Attorney General; 1855–1860	Succeeded by Charles Upson
U.S. Senate
Preceded by Kinsley S. Bingham	U.S. senator (Class 2) from Michigan; 1862–1871; Served alongside: Zachariah Chandler	Succeeded by Thomas W. Ferry
