= 1852 Michigan gubernatorial election =

- November 2, 1852
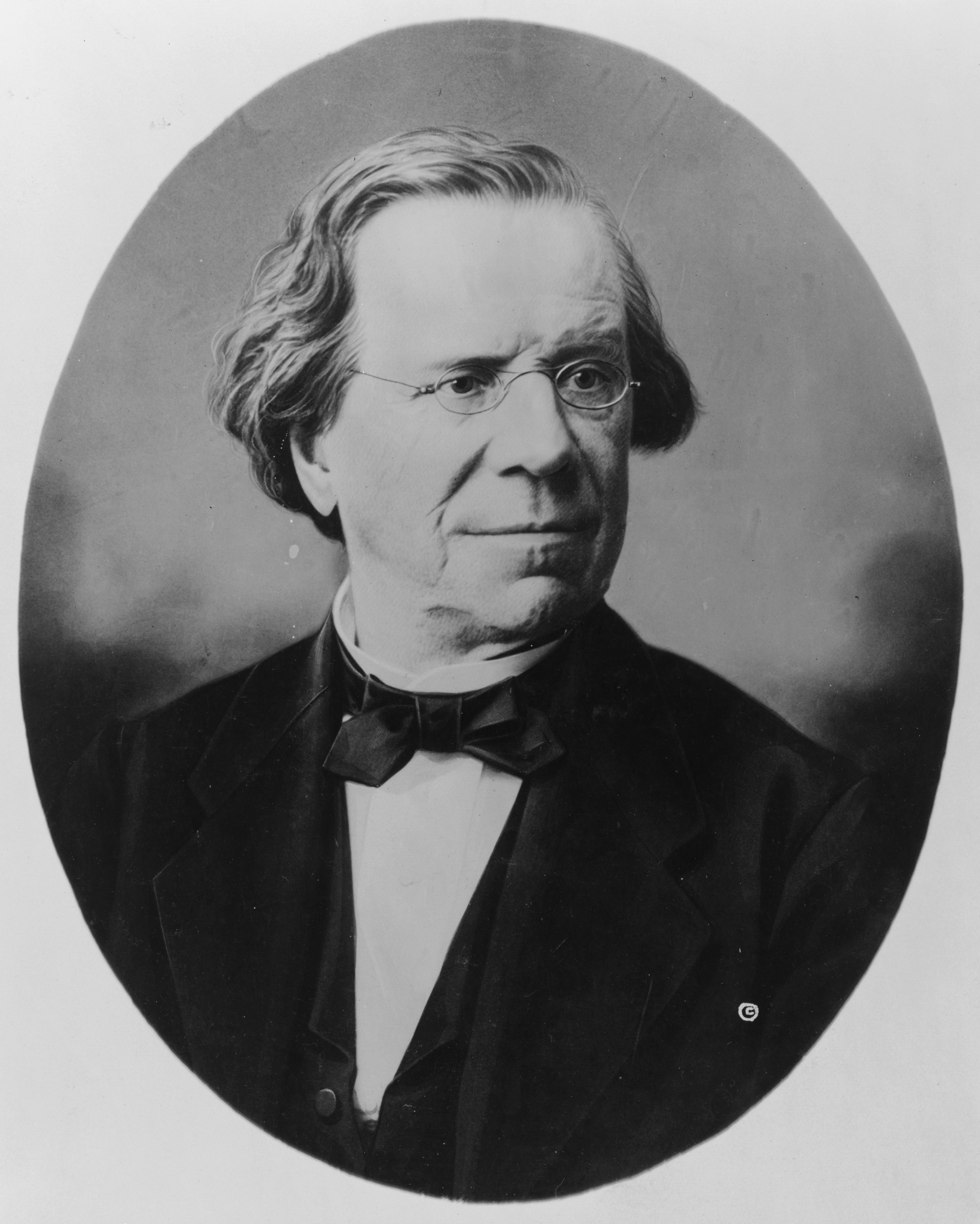

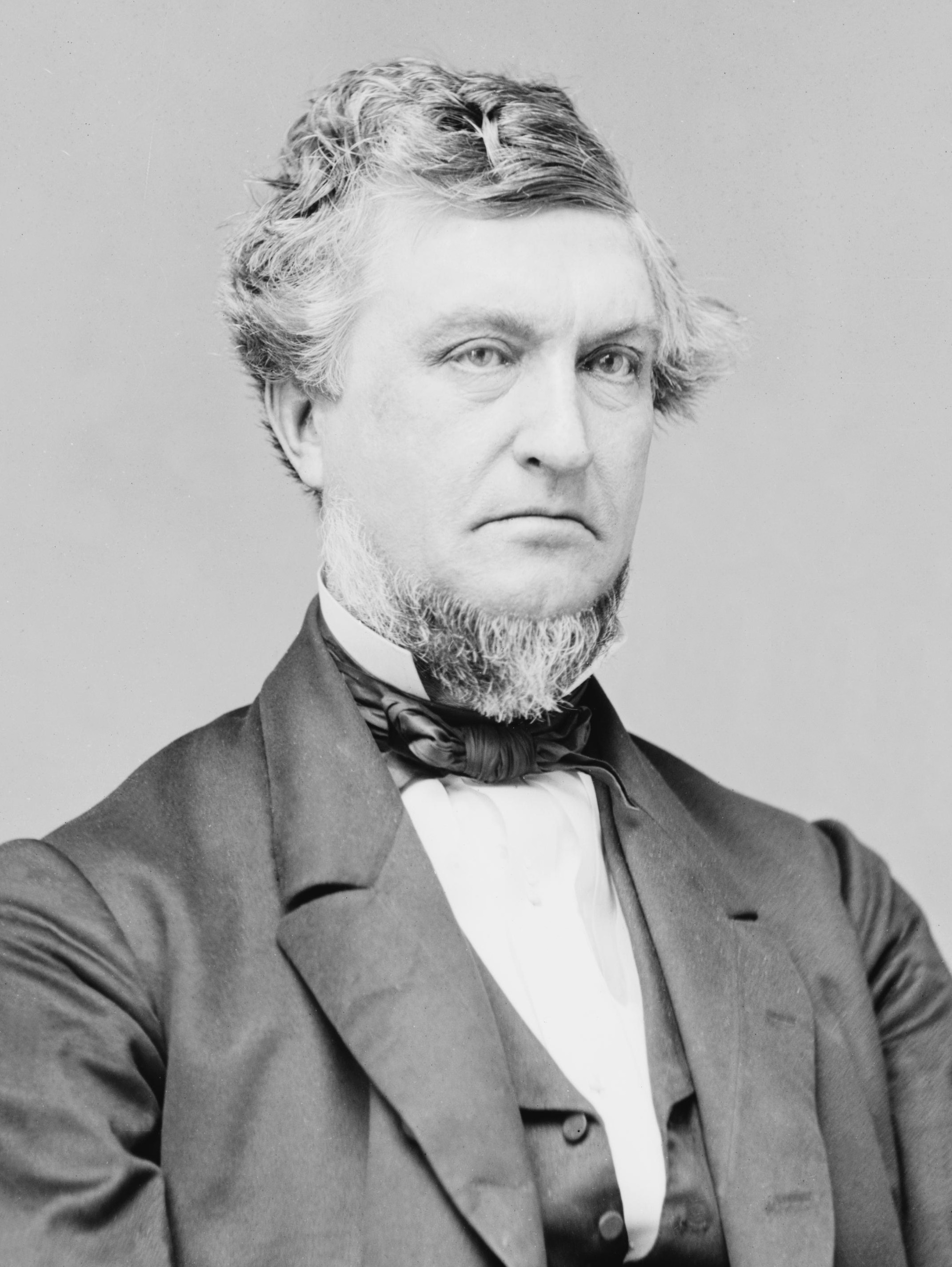

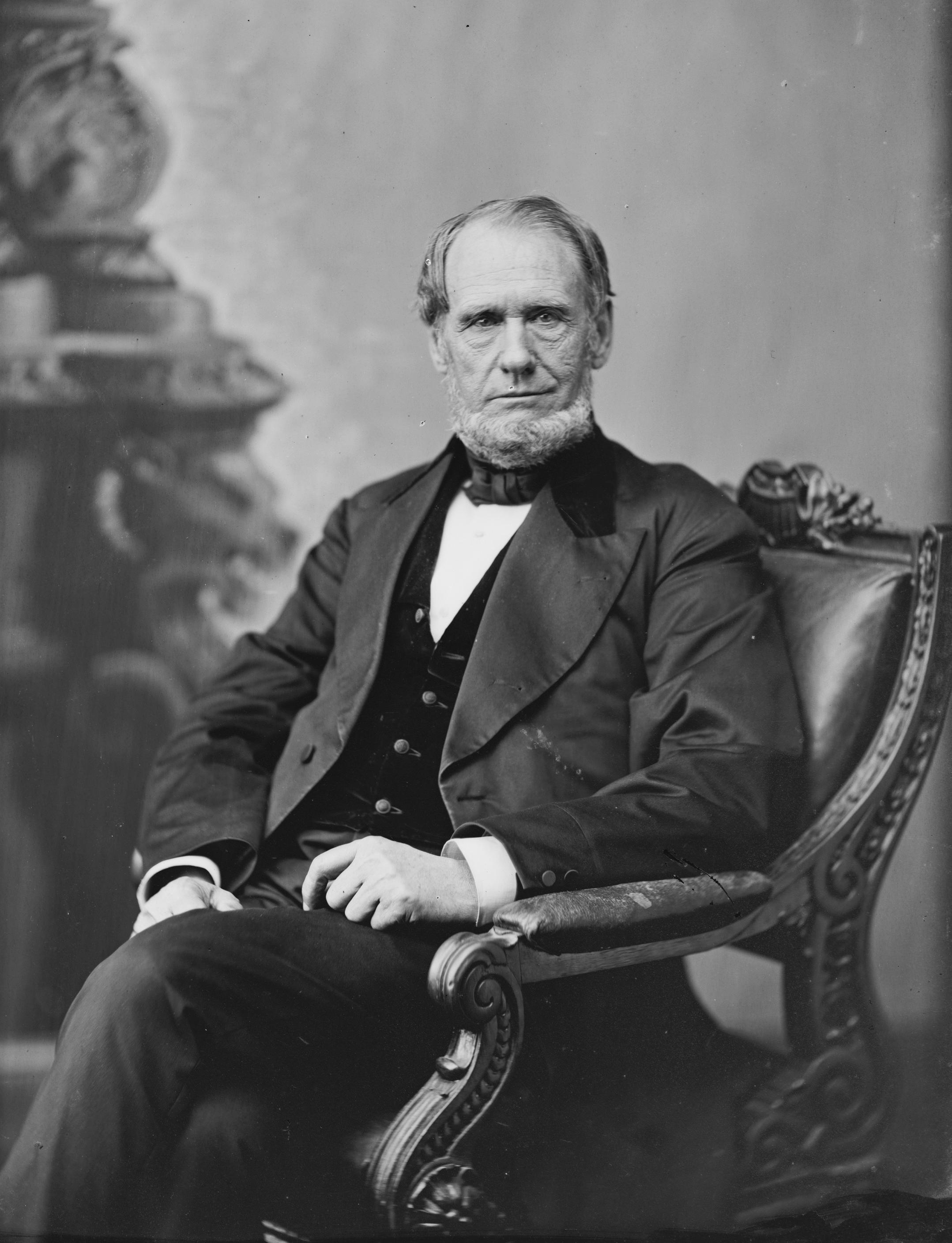
Nominee	Robert McClelland	Zachariah Chandler	Isaac P. Christiancy
Party	Democratic	Whig	Free Soil
Popular vote	42,798	34,660	5,850
Percentage	51.33%	41.57%	7.02%
- County results McClelland: 40–50% 50–60% 60–70% 80–90% Chandler: 40–50% 50–60% No Data/Votes
Governor before election
Robert McClelland
Democratic
Elected Governor
Robert McClelland
Democratic

The 1852 Michigan gubernatorial election was held on November 2, 1852. Incumbent Democrat Robert McClelland defeated Whig nominee Zachariah Chandler with 51.33% of the vote.

Michigan adopted a new constitution in 1850 that shifted the year of gubernatorial election to even years, effective with this election.

== General election ==
=== Candidates ===
Major party candidates

- Robert McClelland, Democratic
- Zachariah Chandler, Whig

Other candidates

- Isaac P. Christiancy, Free Soil

=== Results ===
1852 Michigan gubernatorial election
Party	Candidate	Votes	%	±%
Democratic	Robert McClelland (inc.)	42,798	51.33%	−6.95%
Whig	Zachariah Chandler	34,660	41.57%	+0.23%
Free Soil	Isaac P. Christiancy	5,850	7.02%	
	Imperfect (Note: These are ballots that were intended for the main candidates but contained misspellings. The canvass does not list specific variations, it just groups these votes together.)	63	0.08%	
	Scattering	5	0.01%	
Majority		8,138	9.76%	
Total votes		83,376	100.00%	
Democratic hold				

==== Results By County ====
County	Robert McClelland Democratic		Zachariah Chandler Whig		Isaac P. Christiancy Free Soil		Margin		Total votes cast
County	#	%	#	%	#	%	#	%	Total votes cast
Allegan	619	51.80%	539	45.10%	35	2.93%	80	6.69%	1,195 (Note: Includes 2 Scattering votes)
Allegan	661	53.31%	484	39.03%	95	7.66%	177	14.27%	1,240
Berrien	1,244	54.47%	1,000	43.78%	40	1.75%	244	10.68%	2,284
Branch	1,395	52.31%	1,131	42.41%	139	5.21%	264	9.90%	2,667 (Note: Includes 2 Imperfect votes)
Calhoun	1,850	45.65%	1,883	46.46%	315	7.77%	-33	-0.81%	4,053 (Note: Includes 5 Imperfect votes)
Cass	1,005	48.60%	969	46.86%	52	2.51%	36	1.74%	2,068 (Note: Includes 42 Imperfect votes)
Chippewa	47	47.00%	53	53.00%	0	0.00%	-6	-6.00%	100
Clinton	459	43.63%	469	44.58%	123	11.69%	-10	-0.95%	1,052 (Note: Includes 1 Imperfect vote)
Eaton	811	49.06%	642	38.84%	200	12.10%	169	10.22%	1,653
Genesee	1,179	44.26%	1,213	45.53%	271	10.17%	-34	-1.28%	2,664
Hillsdale	1,632	47.99%	1,413	41.55%	356	10.47%	219	6.44%	3,401
Houghton	134	43.65%	171	55.70%	2	0.65%	-37	-12.05%	307
Ingham	951	51.83%	793	43.22%	91	4.96%	158	8.61%	1,835
Ionia	879	48.22%	673	36.92%	271	14.87%	206	11.30%	1,823
Jackson	1,824	45.05%	1,873	46.26%	350	8.64%	-49	-1.21%	4,049
Kalamazoo	1,311	43.27%	1,392	45.94%	327	10.79%	-81	-2.67%	3,030
Kent	1,543 (Note: Dubin contains a typo for McClelland in this county.)	52.97%	1,240	42.57%	128	4.39%	303	10.40%	2,913
Lapeer	804	50.95%	694	43.98%	80	5.07%	110	6.97%	1,578
Lenawee	2,922	49.29%	2,466	41.60%	539	9.09%	456	7.69%	5,928
Livingston	1,432	57.93%	927	37.50%	113	4.57%	505	20.43%	2,472
Mackinac	295	88.06%	39	11.64%	0	0.00%	256	76.42%	335
Macomb	1,648	51.53%	1,100	34.40%	449	14.04%	548	17.14%	3,198
Marquette	39	65.00%	21	35.00%	0	0.00%	18	30.00%	60
Monroe	1,788	62.10%	933	32.41%	151	5.24%	855	29.70%	2,879 (Note: Includes 6 Imperfect votes and 1 Scattering vote)
Montcalm	163	57.60%	120	42.40%	0	0.00%	43	15.19%	283
Newaygo	107	69.03%	38	24.52%	10	6.45%	69	44.52%	155
Oakland	3,187	52.61%	2,431	40.13%	440	7.26%	756	12.48%	6,058
Ottawa	759	64.32%	367	31.10%	54	4.58%	392	33.22%	1,180
Saginaw	691	60.99%	374	33.01%	67	5.91%	317	27.98%	1,133
Sanilac	249	68.98%	112	31.02%	0	0.00%	137	37.95%	361
Shiawassee	619	53.00%	532	45.55%	17	1.46%	87	7.45%	1,168
St. Clair	1,119	55.45%	852	42.22%	47	2.33%	267	13.23%	2,018
St. Joseph	1,299	48.54%	1,145	42.79%	232	8.67%	154	5.75%	2,676
Tuscola	66	37.50%	85	48.30%	25	14.20%	-19	-10.80%	176
Van Buren	808	54.93%	614	41.74%	49	3.33%	194	13.19%	1,471
Washtenaw	2,630	48.05%	2,346	42.86%	498	9.10%	284	5.19%	5,474
Wayne	4,629	54.85%	3,526	41.78%	284	3.37%	1,103	13.07%	8,439
Total	42,798	51.33%	34,660	41.57%	5,850	7.02%	8,138	9.76%	83,376

===== Counties that flipped from Democratic to Whig =====
- Calhoun
- Chippewa
- Clinton
- Genesee
