= Calvin Britain =

American politician

8th Lieutenant Governor of Michigan
- In office 1852
- Governor: Robert McClelland
- Preceded by: William M. Fenton
- Succeeded by: Andrew Parsons

Member of the Michigan Senate from the 3rd district
- In office November 2, 1835 – January 1, 1837

Member of the Michigan House of Representatives from the Berrien County district
- In office January 4, 1847 – January 2, 1848
- In office January 7, 1850 – January 1, 1852

Personal details
- Born: December 31, 1800 Jefferson County, New York US
- Died: January 18, 1862 (aged 61) St. Joseph, Michigan, US
- Resting place: Saint Joseph City Cemetery, St. Joseph, Michigan, US
- Party: Democratic
- Parent: Gen. Calvin Britain
- Profession: Landowner; Speculator; Politician

Calvin Britain (December 31, 1800 – January 18, 1862) was an American politician who served as the eighth lieutenant governor of Michigan. He served in 1852.

== Biography ==
Britain was born in Jefferson County, New York. Britain came from New York to Michigan Territory in 1827 and for a time was a teacher at the Carey Mission at Niles, Michigan.

== Career ==
In 1829 Britain and Augustus Newell acquired the lands on which the business portion of St. Joseph was later built. Newell built the first hotel in 1831 known as the "Mansion House". The government surveyed the land in 1830, and Britain laid out the plat of the village in 1831 calling it Newburyport. Britain also built a warehouse and bought and sold real estate. The name of the town was changed to St. Joseph in 1834.

As a Democrat, Britain was a member of the Legislative Council of Michigan Territory from 1832 to 1835, Michigan Senate from 1835 to 1837, Michigan House of Representatives from 1847 to 1851, and member of the Constitutional Convention of 1850. Due to changes to the Michigan Constitution adopted at that convention, he was elected to a one-year term as lieutenant governor with Governor Robert McClelland.

== Death and legacy ==
Britain never married and resided in St. Joseph until his death there in 1862. He is interred at Saint Joseph City Cemetery, St. Joseph, Michigan.

Calvin Township in Cass County, Michigan, is named for him.

Political offices
Preceded by William M. Fenton	Lieutenant Governor of Michigan; 1852–1853	Succeeded by Andrew Parsons
