= Edwin H. Lothrop =

American politician

9th Speaker of the Michigan House of Representatives
- In office January 1, 1844 – March 12, 1844
- Preceded by: Robert McClelland
- Succeeded by: Alfred H. Hanscom

Member of the Michigan House of Representatives from the Kalamazoo County district
- In office January 3, 1848 – April 3, 1848
- In office January 3, 1842 – March 12, 1844
- In office November 2, 1835 – December 30, 1837

Personal details
- Born: March 22, 1806
- Died: February 17, 1874 (aged 67) Three Rivers, Michigan
- Resting place: Schoolcraft Cemetery, Schoolcraft, Michigan
- Party: Democratic
- Relations: George V. N. Lothrop (brother)

Edwin H. Lothrop (1806-1874) was an American politician from Michigan who served in the Michigan House of Representatives both prior to and after statehood, and who served as Speaker of the House during the 9th Legislature (coincidentally, as the 9th Speaker). Lothrop was a Democrat.

Born in 1806, Lothrop was a member of the Lothrop-Campbell political family with his brother, George V. N. Lothrop, serving as the Michigan Attorney General and another family member, James, being the Chief Justice of the Michigan Supreme Court.
