= Thomas J. Drake =

American politician (1797–1875)

3rd Lieutenant Governor of Michigan
- In office 1841–1842
- Governor: James Wright Gordon
- Preceded by: James Wright Gordon
- Succeeded by: Origen D. Richardson

Member of the Michigan Senate from the 3rd district
- In office 1839–1841

Personal details
- Born: April 18, 1797 Scipio, New York, U.S.
- Died: April 20, 1875 (aged 78) Pontiac, Michigan, U.S.
- Resting place: Oak Hill Cemetery; Pontiac, Michigan
- Party: Whig
- Spouse(s): Martha Minot Baldwin; Evelina H. Talbot Drake
- Parent(s): Elijah Drake; Abigail (Stoddard) Drake
- Profession: Lawyer; Politician

Thomas Jefferson Drake (April 18, 1797 – April 20, 1875) was an American lawyer and politician in the U.S. state of Michigan. He served as justice of Utah Territorial Supreme Court and as the third lieutenant governor of Michigan.

== Biography ==
Drake was born in Scipio, New York, the son of Elijah Drake and Abigail (Stoddard) Drake. In 1822 he moved to Pontiac in the Michigan Territory. He was a member Michigan Territorial Council from 1828 to 1831, and a member of Michigan Territorial Senate in 1834. From 1839 to 1841 he served as a member of the Michigan Senate representing the 3rd district. In 1840 he was Presidential Elector for Michigan to elect William Henry Harrison.

While serving as president pro tempore of the Michigan Senate, Drake served as the third Lieutenant Governor of Michigan from February 23, 1841, to January 3, 1842, under James Wright Gordon after the resignation of Governor William Woodbridge. Under the 1835 constitution, the lieutenant governor had no specifically defined duties other than presiding over the senate and as filling in as acting governor. He was also a Whig candidate for U.S. Representative from Michigan’s 3rd congressional district in 1843, losing to Democrat James B. Hunt.

Drake was later a delegate to Republican National Convention from Michigan in 1856, and Presidential Elector to elect John C. Fremont, who lost to James Buchanan. He served as justice of Utah Territorial Supreme Court from 1862 to 1869.

Drake died in Pontiac, Michigan on April 20, 1875, two days after his 78th birthday. He is interred in Oak Hill Cemetery in Pontiac.

== Family life ==
Drake married his first wife, Martha Minot Baldwin, on December 17, 1826. He married his second wife, Evelina H. Talbot, on April 19, 1843.

Political offices
Preceded by James Wright Gordon	Lieutenant Governor of Michigan; 1841–1842	Succeeded by Origen D. Richardson
