= 1856 Michigan gubernatorial election =

- November 4, 1856
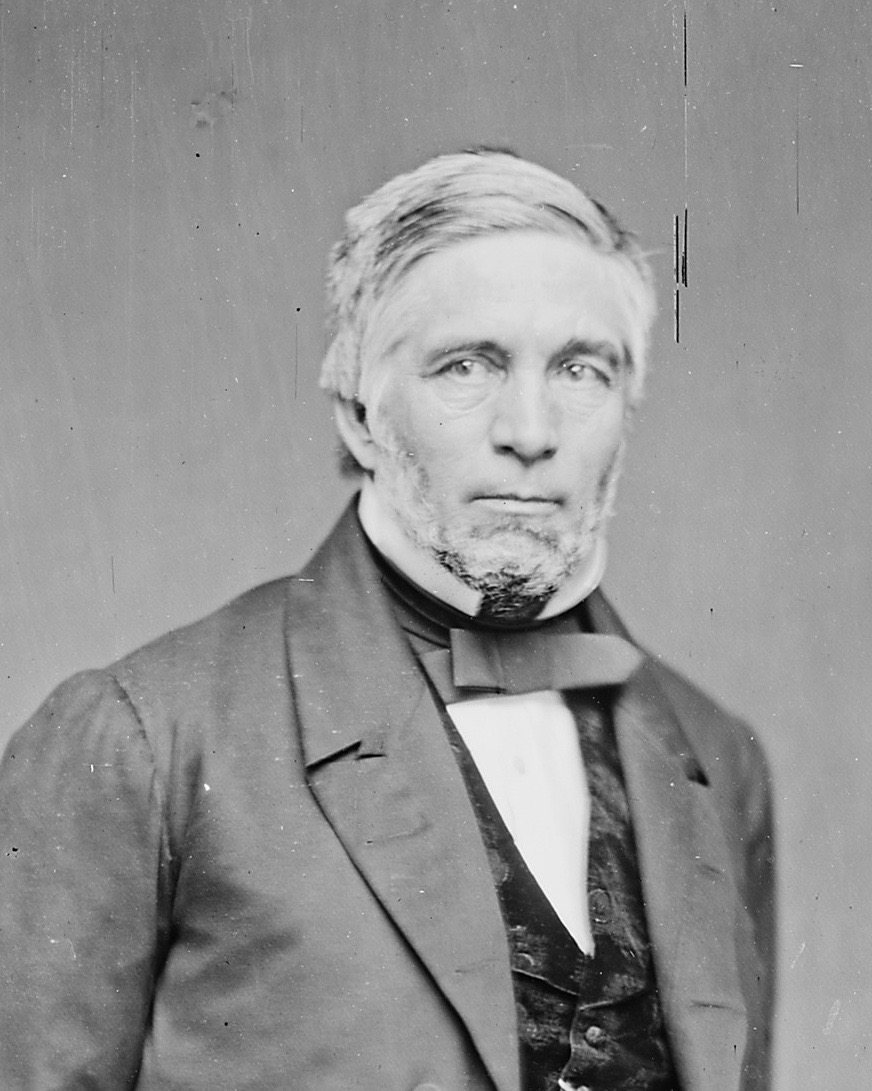

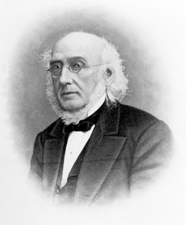
Nominee	Kinsley S. Bingham	Alpheus Felch
Party	Republican	Democratic
Popular vote	71,402	54,085
Percentage	56.87%	43.08%
- County results Bingham: 50–60% 60–70% 70–80% 80–90% Felch: 50–60% 60–70% No data/vote
Governor before election
Kinsley S. Bingham
Republican
Elected Governor
Kinsley S. Bingham
Republican

The 1856 Michigan gubernatorial election was held on November 4, 1856. Incumbent Republican Kinsley S. Bingham defeated Democratic nominee Alpheus Felch with 56.87% of the vote.

== General election ==
=== Candidates ===
Major party candidates

- Kinsley S. Bingham, Republican
- Alpheus Felch, Democratic

=== Results ===
1856 Michigan gubernatorial election
Party	Candidate	Votes	%	±%
Republican	Kinsley S. Bingham (inc.)	71,402	56.87%	+3.87%
Democratic	Alpheus Felch	54,085	43.08%	−3.88%
	Imperfect (Note: These are ballots that were intended for the main candidates but contained misspellings. The canvass does not list specific variations, it just groups these votes together.)	48	0.04%	
	Scattering	23	0.02%	
Majority		17,317	13.79%	
Total votes		125,558	100.00	
Republican hold		Swing	+7.75%	

==== Results by county ====
No votes were recorded in the following organized counties: Cheboygan, Chippewa, Emmet, Mackinac, Newaygo, and Ontonagon. After this election, Grand Traverse County would not vote Democratic again until 1912.

County	Kinsley S. Bingham Republican		Alpheus Felch Democratic		Margin		Total votes cast
County	#	%	#	%	#	%	Total votes cast
Allegan	1,531	58.35%	1,092	41.62%	439	16.73%	2,624 (Note: Includes 1 scattering vote)
Allegan	1,496	62.10%	913	37.90%	583	24.20%	2,409
Berrien	1,941	54.28%	1,634	45.69%	307	8.59%	3,576
Branch	2,604	65.74%	1,356	34.23%	1,248	31.51%	3,961 (Note: Includes 1 imperfect vote)
Calhoun	3,500	60.89%	2,246	39.07%	1,254	21.82%	5,748 (Note: Includes 1 imperfect vote and 1 scattering vote)
Cass	1,699	58.26%	1,210	41.50%	489	16.77%	2,916 (Note: Includes 5 imperfect votes and 2 scattering votes)
Clinton	1,340	55.62%	1,066	44.25%	274	11.37%	2,409 (Note: Includes 2 imperfect votes and 1 scattering vote)
Eaton	1,853	58.99%	1,288	41.01%	565	17.99%	3,141
Genesee	2,663	62.23%	1,614	37.72%	1,049	24.52%	4,279 (Note: Includes 2 scattering votes)
Grand Traverse	152	38.29%	245	61.71%	-93	-23.43%	397
Gratiot	387	73.71%	138	26.29%	249	47.43%	525
Hillsdale	3,435	70.14%	1,462	29.86%	1,973	40.29%	4,897
Houghton	193	32.11%	405	67.39%	-212	-35.27%	601 (Note: Includes 3 scattering votes)
Ingham	1,844	54.09%	1,565	45.91%	279	8.18%	3,409
Ionia	1,983	62.46%	1,192	37.54%	791	24.91%	3,175
Jackson	2,971	57.51%	2,194	42.47%	777	15.04%	5,166
Kalamazoo	2,807	62.74%	1,667	37.26%	1,140	25.48%	4,474
Kent	2,946	53.14%	2,596	46.83%	350	6.31%	5,544
Lapeer	1,564	59.99%	1,043	40.01%	521	19.98%	2,607
Lenawee	4,496	60.36%	2,953	39.64%	1,543	20.71%	7,449
Livingston	1,727	49.54%	1,759	50.46%	-32	-0.92%	3,486
Macomb	2,205	54.08%	1,872	45.92%	333	8.17%	4,077
Marquette	78	44.32%	98	55.68%	-20	-11.36%	176
Mason	32	72.73%	12	27.27%	20	45.45%	44
Midland	172	80.00%	43	20.00%	129	60.00%	215
Monroe	1,767	50.34%	1,743	49.66%	24	0.68%	3,510
Montcalm	405	58.95%	282	41.05%	123	17.90%	687
Oakland	4,060	54.48%	3,391	45.50%	669	8.98%	7,452
Oceana	83	79.81%	21	20.19%	62	59.62%	104
Ottawa	1,393	57.71%	1,012	41.92%	381	15.78%	2,414 (Note: Includes 9 scattering votes)
Saginaw	1,037	45.40%	1,247	54.60%	-210	-9.19%	2,284
Sanilac	805	79.94%	202	20.06%	603	59.88%	1,007
Shiawassee	1,297	53.13%	1,111	45.51%	186	7.62%	2,441 (Note: Includes 33 imperfect votes)
St. Clair	1,796	53.64%	1,548	46.24%	248	7.41%	3,348 (Note: Includes 4 imperfect votes)
St. Joseph	2,301	60.31%	1,513	39.66%	788	20.66%	3,815
Tuscola	435	62.41%	262	37.59%	173	24.82%	697
Van Buren	1,706	61.48%	1,069	38.52%	637	22.95%	2,775
Washtenaw	3,538	54.28%	2,980	45.72%	558	8.56%	6,518
Wayne	5,160	46.07%	6,041	53.93%	-881	-7.87%	11,201
Total	71,402	56.87%	54,085	43.08%	17,317	13.79%	125,558

===== Counties that flipped from Democratic to Republican =====
- Allegan
- Ingham
- Lapeer
- Macomb
- Monroe
- Ottawa
- Sanilac
- Shiawassee

===== Counties that flipped from Republican to Democratic =====
- Grand Traverse
- Houghton
