= 1964 Michigan gubernatorial election =

- November 3, 1964
- Turnout: 40.37%
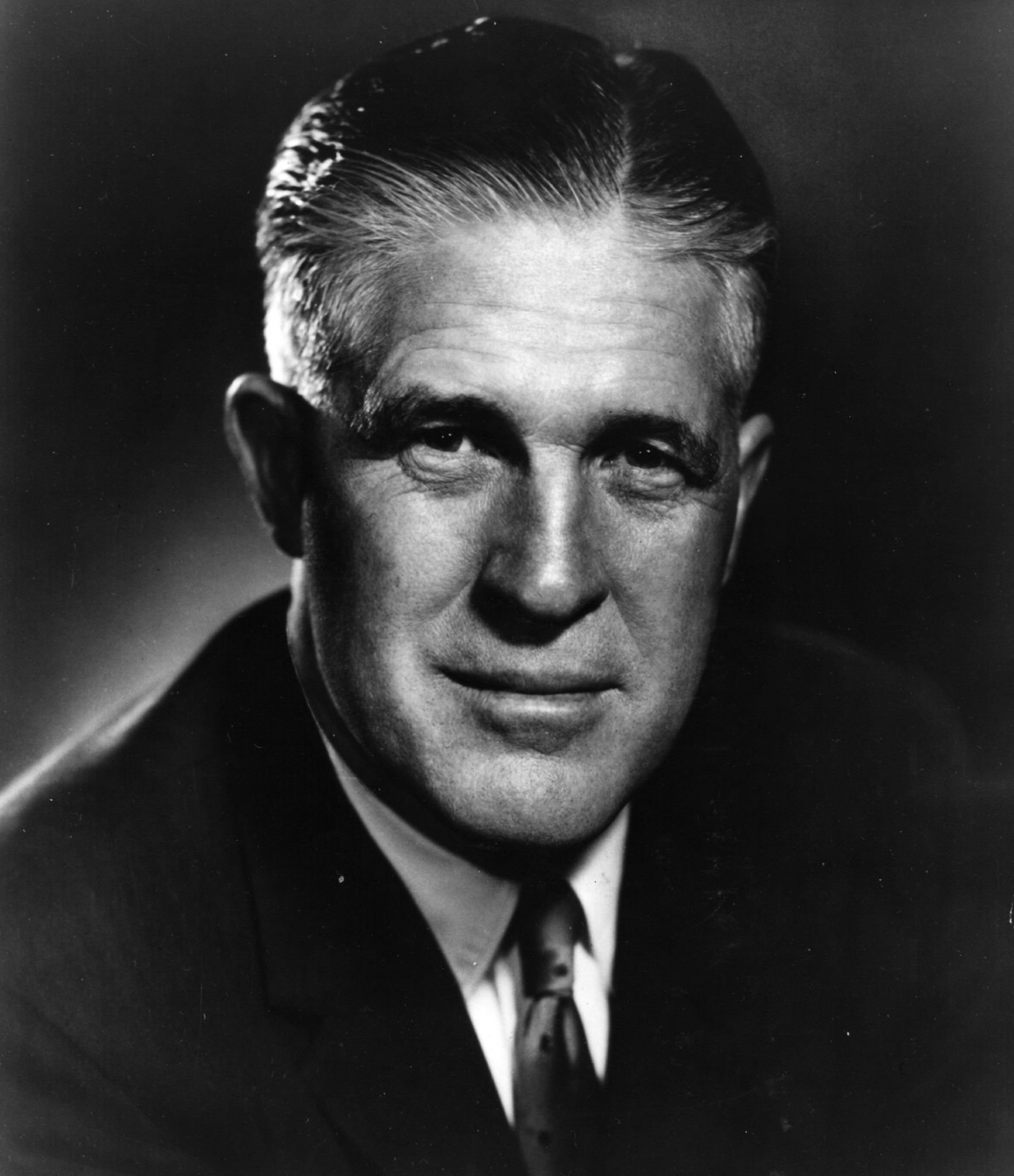

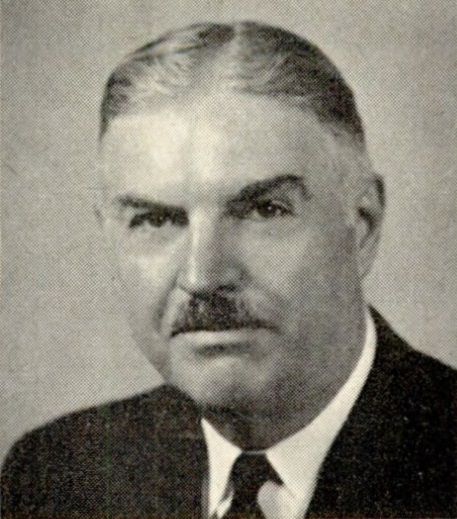
Nominee	George W. Romney	Neil O. Staebler
Party	Republican	Democratic
Running mate	William Milliken	Robert A. Derengoski
Popular vote	1,764,355	1,381,442
Percentage	55.87%	43.74%
- County results Romney: 50–60% 60–70% 70–80% Staebler: 50–60%
Governor before election
George W. Romney
Republican
Elected Governor
George W. Romney
Republican

The 1964 Michigan gubernatorial election was held on November 3, 1964. Incumbent Republican George W. Romney defeated Democratic nominee Neil O. Staebler with 55.87% of the vote.

This was the first election in which the governor and lieutenant governor were elected on a joint ticket. Previously, both offices were elected separately. This also marked the last time the governor was elected to a two-year term, as in 1963 a new state constitution had been adopted, extending the term length to four years, effective with the next election.

== Primary election ==
Michigan held primary elections on September 1, 1964.

=== Republican party ===
Incumbent governor George W. Romney easily won renomination.

==== Candidates ====
- George W. Romney, incumbent governor
- George N. Higgins, former member of Michigan Senate

==== Results ====
Republican primary results
Party	Candidate	Votes	%
Republican	George W. Romney (inc.)	583,356	87.86%
Republican	George N. Higgins	80,608	12.14%
Republican	Scattering	17	0.00%
Total votes		663,981	100.00%

=== Democratic party ===
United States Representative Neil Staebler won the Democratic nomination unopposed.

==== Candidates ====
- Neil Staebler, representative from Michigan's at-large congressional district

==== Results ====
Democratic primary results
Party	Candidate	Votes	%
Democratic	Neil Staebler	510,588	99.99%
Democratic	Scattering	42	0.01%
Total votes		510,630	100.00%

== General election ==
=== Candidates ===
Major party candidates

- George W. Romney & William Milliken, Republican
- Neil Staebler & Robert A. Derengoski, Democratic

Other candidates

- Frank Lovell & Harriet Talan, Socialist Workers
- Albert B. Cleage Jr. & James Jackson, Freedom Now
- James C. Horvath & W. Clifford Bentley, Socialist Labor

=== Results ===
1964 Michigan gubernatorial election
Party	Candidate	Votes	%	±%
Republican	George W. Romney (inc.)	1,764,355	55.87%	+4.51%
Democratic	Neil Staebler	1,381,442	43.74%	−4.71%
Socialist Workers	Frank Lovell	5,649	0.18%	
Freedom Now	Albert B. Cleage Jr.	4,767	0.15%	
Socialist Labor	James C. Horvath	1,777	0.06%	−0.13%
Scattering		112	0.00%	
Majority		382,913	12.12%	
Total votes		3,158,102	100.00%	
Republican hold		Swing	+9.21%	

==== Results by county ====
Delta County and Dickinson County voted Republican for the first time since 1930.

County	George W. Romney Republican		Neil Staebler Democratic		All Others Various		Margin		Total votes cast
County	#	%	#	%	#	%	#	%	Total votes cast
Alcona	1,799	64.81%	975	35.12%	2	0.07%	824	29.68%	2,776
Alger	1,732	46.98%	1,950	52.89%	5	0.14%	-218	-5.91%	3,687
Allegan	16,159	70.54%	6,706	29.27%	42	0.18%	9,453	41.27%	22,907
Alpena	7,009	62.18%	4,260	37.79%	4	0.04%	2,749	24.39%	11,273
Antrim	3,320	68.91%	1,495	31.03%	3	0.06%	1,825	37.88%	4,818
Arenac	2,288	59.93%	1,527	39.99%	3	0.08%	761	19.93%	3,818
Baraga	1,777	48.30%	1,887	51.29%	15	0.41%	-110	-2.99%	3,679
Barry	9,066	67.07%	4,423	32.72%	29	0.21%	4,643	34.35%	13,518
Bay	22,157	53.79%	18,892	45.86%	142	0.34%	3,265	7.93%	41,191
Benzie	2,460	68.05%	1,153	31.89%	2	0.06%	1,307	36.15%	3,615
Berrien	33,533	57.00%	25,079	42.63%	217	0.37%	8,454	14.37%	58,829
Branch	8,140	63.27%	4,683	36.40%	42	0.33%	3,457	26.87%	12,865
Calhoun	32,267	62.53%	19,175	37.16%	164	0.32%	13,092	25.37%	51,606
Cass	7,462	51.61%	6,948	48.05%	49	0.34%	514	3.55%	14,459
Charlevoix	4,096	64.97%	2,204	34.96%	4	0.06%	1,892	30.01%	6,304
Cheboygan	3,899	61.33%	2,455	38.62%	3	0.05%	1,444	22.72%	6,357
Chippewa	6,346	61.24%	3,995	38.55%	22	0.21%	2,351	22.69%	10,363
Clare	3,394	66.19%	1,725	33.64%	9	0.18%	1,669	32.55%	5,128
Clinton	9,305	63.39%	5,364	36.54%	11	0.07%	3,941	26.85%	14,680
Crawford	1,328	62.20%	807	37.80%	0	0.00%	521	24.40%	2,135
Delta	7,422	52.44%	6,705	47.38%	26	0.18%	717	5.07%	14,153
Dickinson	5,672	51.54%	5,319	48.33%	15	0.14%	353	3.21%	11,006
Eaton	13,841	64.92%	7,450	34.94%	29	0.14%	6,391	29.98%	21,320
Emmet	4,424	64.72%	2,400	35.11%	12	0.18%	2,024	29.61%	6,836
Genesee	77,234	52.64%	69,069	47.08%	413	0.28%	8,165	5.57%	146,716
Gladwin	3,060	66.58%	1,535	33.40%	1	0.02%	1,525	33.18%	4,596
Gogebic	5,046	45.47%	6,016	54.21%	35	0.32%	-970	-8.74%	11,097
Grand Traverse	9,565	70.26%	4,018	29.52%	3	0.22%	5,547	40.75%	13,613
Gratiot	8,743	69.01%	3,912	30.88%	15	0.12%	4,831	38.13%	12,670
Hillsdale	8,850	68.47%	4,053	31.36%	23	0.18%	4,797	37.11%	12,926
Houghton	7,721	52.94%	6,856	47.01%	8	0.05%	865	5.93%	14,585
Huron	8,793	65.70%	4,573	34.17%	17	0.13%	4,220	31.53%	13,383
Ingham	53,862	62.27%	32,479	37.55%	160	0.18%	21,383	24.72%	86,501
Ionia	10,125	63.11%	5,893	36.73%	25	0.16%	4,232	26.38%	16,043
Iosco	4,567	65.77%	2,375	34.20%	2	0.03%	2,192	31.57%	6,944
Iron	3,961	48.10%	4,268	51.83%	6	0.07%	-307	-3.73%	8,235
Isabella	7,695	66.40%	3,884	33.51%	10	0.09%	3,811	32.88%	11,589
Jackson	30,246	62.17%	18,291	37.59%	116	0.24%	11,955	24.57%	48,653
Kalamazoo	46,970	69.88%	19,953	29.69%	291	0.43%	27,017	40.20%	67,214
Kalkaska	1,368	66.54%	682	33.17%	6	0.29%	686	33.37%	2,056
Kent	99,528	65.68%	51,669	34.10%	344	0.23%	47,859	31.58%	151,541
Keweenaw	588	49.12%	608	50.79%	1	0.08%	-20	-1.67%	1,197
Lake	1,246	46.88%	1,409	53.01%	3	0.11%	-163	-6.13%	2,658
Lapeer	9,668	66.69%	4,818	33.24%	10	0.07%	4,850	33.46%	14,496
Leelanau	3,041	69.46%	1,327	30.31%	10	0.23%	1,714	39.15%	4,378
Lenawee	18,197	65.05%	9,682	34.61%	95	0.34%	8,515	30.44%	27,974
Livingston	11,023	67.63%	5,232	32.10%	45	0.28%	5,791	35.53%	16,300
Luce	1,474	63.98%	830	36.02%	0	0.00%	644	27.95%	2,304
Mackinac	2,977	63.71%	1,694	36.25%	2	0.04%	1,283	27.46%	4,673
Macomb	91,228	52.49%	81,955	47.16%	604	0.35%	9,273	5.34%	173,787
Manistee	4,777	57.33%	3,550	42.60%	6	0.07%	1,227	14.72%	8,333
Marquette	10,987	54.10%	9,275	45.67%	47	0.23%	1,712	8.43%	20,309
Mason	5,813	59.90%	3,886	40.04%	6	0.06%	1,927	19.86%	9,705
Mecosta	5,228	69.26%	2,315	30.67%	5	0.07%	2,913	38.59%	7,548
Menominee	5,621	53.97%	4,770	45.80%	24	0.23%	851	8.17%	10,415
Midland	15,319	71.28%	6,131	28.53%	42	0.20%	9,188	42.75%	21,492
Missaukee	2,306	76.54%	706	23.43%	1	0.03%	1,600	53.10%	3,013
Monroe	20,388	54.40%	16,959	45.25%	134	0.36%	3,429	9.15%	37,481
Montcalm	9,411	67.13%	4,593	32.76%	16	0.11%	4,818	34.37%	14,020
Montmorency	1,403	63.95%	790	36.01%	1	0.05%	613	27.94%	2,194
Muskegon	34,009	58.32%	23,646	40.55%	655	1.12%	10,363	17.77%	58,310
Newaygo	7,099	68.92%	3,190	30.97%	12	0.12%	3,909	37.95%	10,301
Oakland	190,653	64.43%	103,977	35.14%	1,264	0.43%	86,676	29.29%	295,894
Oceana	4,282	64.84%	2,314	35.04%	8	0.12%	1,968	29.80%	6,604
Ogemaw	2,610	59.52%	1,772	40.41%	3	0.07%	838	19.11%	4,385
Ontonagon	2,720	53.87%	2,324	46.03%	5	0.10%	396	7.84%	5,049
Osceola	3,972	71.25%	1,594	28.59%	9	0.16%	2,378	42.65%	5,575
Oscoda	1,173	69.33%	516	30.50%	3	0.18%	657	38.83%	1,692
Otsego	2,044	59.54%	1,388	40.43%	1	0.03%	656	19.11%	3,433
Ottawa	32,931	74.23%	11,317	25.51%	118	0.27%	21,614	48.72%	44,366
Presque Isle	2,840	54.24%	2,393	45.70%	3	0.06%	447	8.54%	5,236
Roscommon	2,645	65.89%	1,366	34.03%	3	0.07%	1,279	31.86%	4,014
Saginaw	40,874	55.98%	31,883	43.67%	260	0.36%	8,991	12.31%	73,017
Sanilac	10,245	74.80%	3,444	25.15%	7	0.05%	6,801	49.66%	13,696
Schoolcraft	2,089	52.67%	1,873	47.23%	4	0.10%	216	5.45%	3,966
Shiawassee	12,842	60.60%	8,257	38.96%	93	0.44%	4,585	21.64%	21,192
St. Clair	26,794	65.47%	14,026	34.27%	108	0.26%	12,768	31.20%	40,928
St. Joseph	10,928	66.72%	5,425	33.12%	25	0.15%	5,503	33.60%	16,378
Tuscola	10,969	66.24%	5,582	33.71%	8	0.05%	5,387	32.53%	16,559
Van Buren	12,101	63.25%	6,944	36.30%	87	0.45%	5,157	26.95%	19,132
Washtenaw	45,894	67.99%	21,312	31.57%	300	0.44%	24,582	36.41%	67,506
Wayne	483,012	44.91%	586,591	54.54%	5,920	0.55%	-103,579	-9.63%	1,075,523
Wexford	4,704	63.71%	2,675	36.23%	5	0.07%	2,029	27.48%	7,384
Total	1,764,355	55.87%	1,381,442	43.74%	12,305	0.39%	382,913	12.12%	3,158,102

===== Counties that flipped from Democratic to Republican =====
- Bay
- Delta
- Dickinson
- Genesee
- Macomb
- Marquette

===== Counties that flipped from Republican to Democratic =====
- Gogebic
- Keweenaw
