= Origen D. Richardson =

American politician (1795–1876)

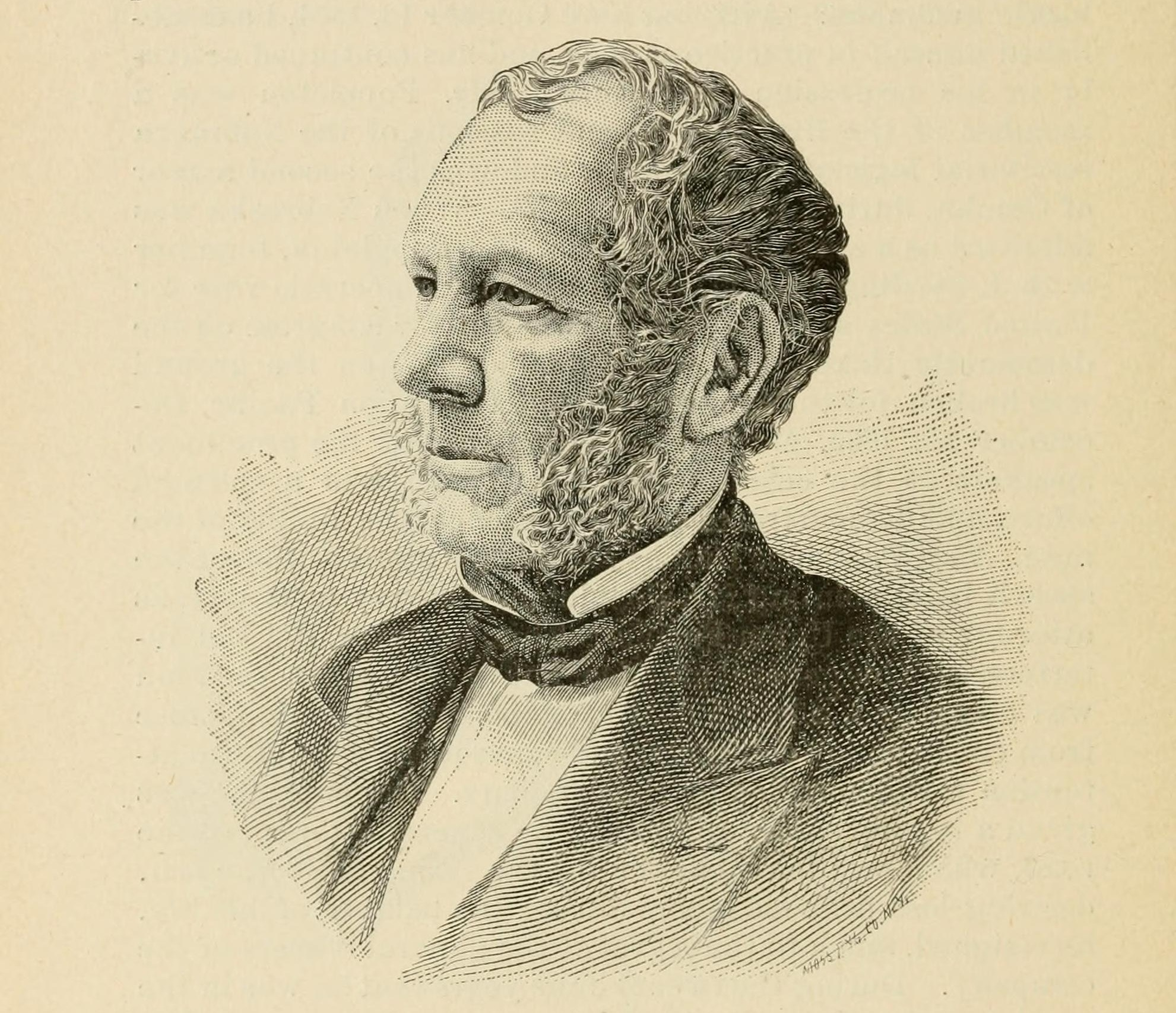

4th Lieutenant Governor of Michigan
- In office 1842–1846
- Governor: John S. Barry
- Preceded by: Thomas J. Drake
- Succeeded by: William L. Greenly

Member of the Michigan House of Representatives from the Oakland County district
- In office 1841
- In office 1835–1836

Personal details
- Born: July 20, 1795 Woodstock, Vermont, United States
- Died: November 29, 1876 (aged 81) Omaha, Nebraska, United States
- Resting place: Prospect Hill Cemetery; Omaha, Nebraska
- Party: Democratic
- Spouse: Sarah P. Hill Richardson
- Children: Lyman Richardson; Cornelia Richardson
- Parent(s): Mason Richardson; Mary (Powers) Richardson
- Profession: Lawyer; Politician

Origen Drew Richardson (July 20, 1795 – November 29, 1876) was an American lawyer and politician in the U.S. state of Michigan and in the Nebraska Territory. He served in the Michigan House of Representatives and was the fourth lieutenant governor of Michigan.

== Biography ==
Richardson was born in Woodstock, Vermont, the son of Mason Richardson and Mary (Powers) Richardson. He studied and practiced law in Woodstock. While a student in the law offices of a relative, Israel Putnam Richardson (the father of Civil War General Israel Bush Richardson), Origen joined the Army and participated in the Battle of Plattsburgh during the War of 1812. He remained in Vermont and practiced law until 1826, when he moved to Pontiac, Michigan Territory. He was admitted to the bar of Oakland County in July 1826 and began a law practice. In 1830, he was a part of a three-member commission appointed to locate a seat of government for Saginaw County, which at the time was not yet organized.

== Michigan politics ==
He was a member of the first convention of assent held in Ann Arbor in September 1836 that rejected the conditions placed by the U.S. Congress on the admission of Michigan as a State of the Union (see the Frostbitten Convention and the end of the Toledo War). From 1830 to 1836, he was the Oakland County prosecutor and served as a member of the Michigan House of Representatives in the first legislature, which convened at Detroit in November 1835 and of the sixth legislature, which convened in Detroit in January 1841.

In 1841, he was elected the fourth Lieutenant Governor of Michigan and was re-elected in 1843, serving during the first four years of Governor John S. Barry's governorship. He continued the practice of law in Pontiac until 1854.

== Nebraska Territory politics ==
In the fall of 1854, he moved to Omaha, Nebraska, which had been organized as the Nebraska Territory in May of that year. He served as a member of the Legislative Council in the first and second sessions of the Territorial Nebraska Legislature. He took a prominent part in framing the laws of Nebraska and was one of the three commissioners to codify those laws.

In 1855, Origen D. Richardson accompanied John Milton Thayer on a diplomatic mission to meet with Pawnee leaders in the Nebraska Territory. The meeting followed reports of Pawnee raids on settlers in the Elkhorn Valley, after which Acting Territorial Governor Thomas B. Cuming instructed Thayer, then a major general in the territorial militia, to lead a council aimed at stabilizing relations.

== Family life ==
Richardson and his wife Sarah P. (Hill) Richardson had two children, Lyman Richardson and Cornelia Richardson. Although Richardson nominally resided in Nebraska, his wife and family remained in Pontiac until moving there in 1874. He died only two years later of apoplexy. His wife died three days afterwards. Both were buried in Prospect Hill Cemetery in Omaha.

Political offices
Preceded by Thomas J. Drake	Lieutenant Governor of Michigan; 1842–1846	Succeeded by William L. Greenly
