= S. Titus Parsons =

American politician (??–1881)

Member of the Michigan House of Representatives from the Shiawassee County 1st district
- In office 1863–1864
- Preceded by: District established
- Succeeded by: Nathaniel G. Phillips
- In office 1867–1868
- Preceded by: Nathaniel G. Phillips
- Succeeded by: John N. Ingersoll

Personal details
- Born: New York
- Died: April 9, 1881
- Party: Republican
- Other political affiliations: Greenback (1879–1880)

Samuel Titus Parsons (died April 9, 1881) was an American lawyer and politician.

== Early life ==
S. Titus Parsons was born in New York. He was the son of John Parsons, whose father was Andrew Parsons, a veteran of the Revolutionary War. He was first admitted to the bar in Mexico, Oswego County, New York. Parsons later moved to Michigan. He did so after three of his brothers.

== Career ==
In Owosso, Parsons studied in the law office of two of his brothers, Andrew and Luke H. Parsons. He was admitted to the Shiawassee County bar in May 1854. He then moved to Corunna, where he would practice law for over twenty years. He was elected prosecuting attorney of Shiawassee County in 1856, and was re-elected in 1858.

In 1862, Parsons was elected to the Michigan House of Representatives as a Republican. He represented the Shiawassee County 1st district from 1863 to 1864, and served on the judiciary committee. He was again elected to the state legislature in 1866, and served from 1867 to 1868, where he again serve on the judiciary committee, and additionally served on the elections committee. He was one of the delegates from Shiawassee County in the 1867 Michigan constitutional convention. He was again elected prosecuting attorney in 1872.

In 1877, Parsons moved to Detroit, where he continued to practice law. By 1879, Parsons was associated with the Greenback Party, in February of that year being elected chairman of the Wayne County Greenback Committee. In March 1880, Parsons was elected as a delegate from Wayne County to the Greenback State Convention in Jackson, Michigan. By July 1880, Parsons returned to the Republican Party.

== Personal life ==
In 1869, S. Titus Parsons divorced from his wife on grounds of extreme cruelty.

== Death ==
Parsons died on April 9, 1881.
