= 1845 Michigan gubernatorial election =

- November 4, 1845
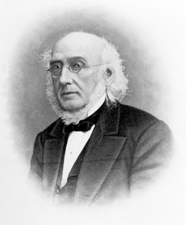

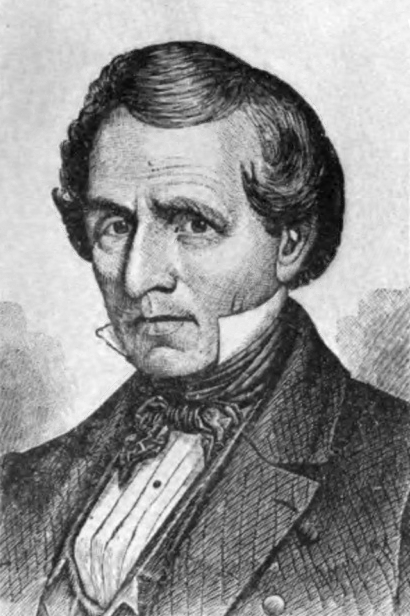

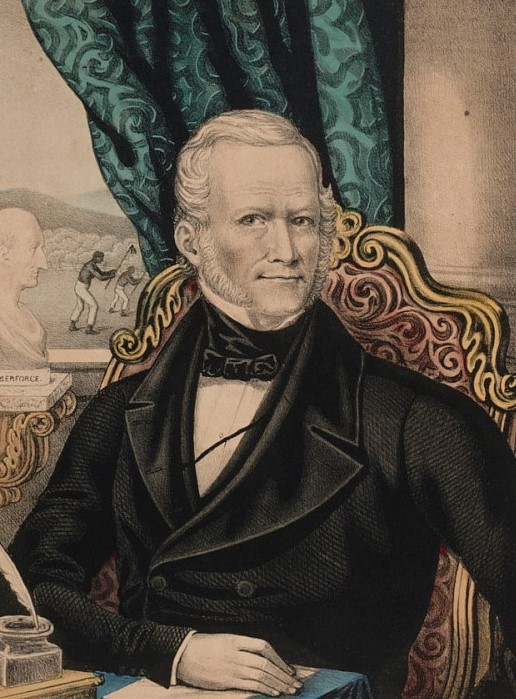
Nominee	Alpheus Felch	Stephen Vickery	James G. Birney
Party	Democratic	Whig	Liberty
Popular vote	20,123	16,316	3,045
Percentage	50.83%	41.21%	7.69%
- County results Felch: 40–50% 50–60% 60–70% 70–80% Vickery: 40–50% 60–70% No Data/Votes
Governor before election
John S. Barry
Democratic
Elected Governor
Alpheus Felch
Democratic

The 1845 Michigan gubernatorial election was held on November 4, 1845. Democratic nominee Alpheus Felch defeated Whig nominee Stephen Vickery with 50.83% of the vote.

== General election ==
=== Candidates ===
Major party candidates

- Alpheus Felch, Democratic
- Stephen Vickery, Whig

Other candidates

- James G. Birney, Liberty

=== Results ===
1845 Michigan gubernatorial election
Party	Candidate	Votes	%	±%
Democratic	Alpheus Felch	20,123	50.83%	−3.83%
Whig	Stephen Vickery	16,316	41.21%	+3.15%
Liberty	James G. Birney	3,045	7.69%	+0.60%
	Scattering	90	0.23%	
	Blank	15	0.04%	
Majority		3,807	9.62%	
Total votes		39,589	100.00%	
Democratic hold		Swing	-6.68%	

==== Results By County ====
County	Alpheus Felch Democratic		Stephen Vickery Whig		James G. Birney Liberty		Scattering Write-in		Margin		Total votes cast
County	#	%	#	%	#	%	#	%	#	%	Total votes cast
Allegan	281	49.47%	274	48.24%	12	2.11%	1	0.18%	7	1.23%	568
Barry	254	52.92%	206	42.92%	119	3.96%	0	0.00%	48	10.00%	480 (Note: Includes 1 Blank votes)
Berrien	660	59.57%	422	38.09%	26	2.35%	0	0.00%	238	21.48%	1,108
Branch	706	61.55%	359	31.30%	81	7.06%	0	0.00%	347	30.25%	1,147
Calhoun	1,185	50.79%	980	42.01%	159	6.82%	9	0.39%	205	8.79%	2,333
Cass	570	48.97%	518	44.50%	76	6.53%	0	0.00%	52	4.47%	1,164
Chippewa	9	39.13%	14	60.87%	0	0.00%	0	0.00%	-5	-21.74%	23
Clinton	237	52.55%	162	35.92%	51	11.31%	1	0.22%	75	16.63%	451
Eaton	315	43.03%	351	47.95%	66	9.02%	0	0.00%	-36	-4.92%	732
Genesee	579	47.38%	442	36.17%	199	16.28%	2	0.16%	137	11.21%	1,222
Hillsdale	1,025	52.75%	749	38.55%	168	8.65%	0	0.00%	276	14.20%	1,943
Ingham	403	49.51%	325	39.93%	86	10.57%	0	0.00%	78	9.58%	814
Ionia	416	51.23%	314	38.67%	81	9.98%	1	0.12%	102	12.56%	812
Kalamazoo	572	35.59%	796	49.53%	237	14.75%	0	0.00%	-224	-13.94%	1,607 (Note: Includes 2 Blank votes)
Kent	500	51.23%	433	44.36%	42	4.30%	1	0.10%	67	6.86%	976
Lapeer	361	49.05%	295	40.08%	67	9.10%	13	1.77%	66	8.97%	736
Lenawee	1,787	48.57%	1,704	46.32%	185 (Note: Includes 1 vote for "J. G. Birney")	5.03%	3	0.08%	83	2.26%	3,679
Livingston	823	58.53%	465	33.07%	114	8.11%	4	0.28%	358	25.46%	1,406
Mackinac	99	86.84%	15	13.16%	0	0.00%	0	0.00%	84	73.68%	114
Macomb	788	53.06%	559	37.64%	136	9.16%	1	0.07%	229	15.42%	1,485
Monroe	1,019	70.57%	404	27.98%	21 (Note: These votes were listed separately for "J. G. Birney")	1.45%	0	0.00%	615	42.59%	1,444
Oakland	1,981	51.86%	1,438	37.64%	392	10.26%	8	0.21%	543	14.21%	3,820
Ottawa	136	68.34%	45	22.61%	18	9.05%	0	0.00%	91	45.73%	199
Saginaw	89	47.85%	87	46.77%	9	4.84%	0	0.00%	2	1.08%	186
Shiawassee	232	44.53%	159	30.52%	122	23.42%	8	1.54%	73	14.01%	521
St. Clair	474	51.63%	383	41.72%	56	6.10%	5	0.54%	91	9.91%	918
St. Joseph	790	51.37%	680	44.21%	68	4.42%	0	0.00%	110	7.15%	1,538
Van Buren	312	54.83%	213	37.43%	44	7.73%	0	0.00%	99	17.40%	569
Washtenaw	1,759	43.21%	2,005	49.25%	305	7.49%	2	0.05%	-246	-6.04%	4,071
Wayne	1,761	49.99%	1,519	43.12%	205	5.82%	31	0.88%	242	6.87%	3,523 (Note: Includes 7 Blank votes)
Total	20,123	50.83%	16,316	41.21%	3,045	7.69%	90	0.23%	3,807	9.62%	39,589

===== Counties that flipped from Whig to Democratic =====
- Allegan
- Cass
- Mackinac

===== Counties that flipped from Democratic to Whig =====
- Chippewa
- Kalamazoo
- Washtenaw
