= Neil Staebler =

American politician (1905–2000)

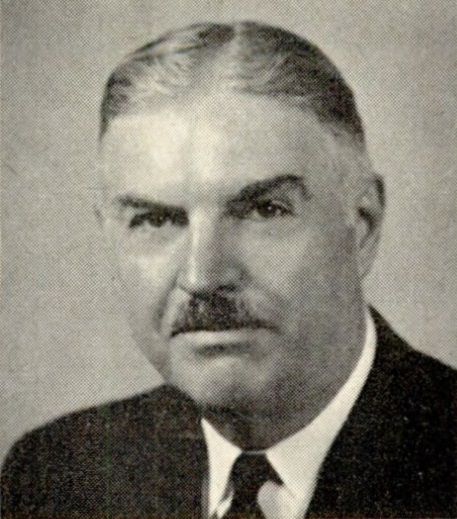

Member of the Federal Election Commission
- In office April 1975 – October 1978
- President: Gerald Ford; Jimmy Carter

Member of the U.S. House of Representatives from Michigan's at-large district
- In office January 3, 1963 – January 3, 1965
- Preceded by: District established
- Succeeded by: District abolished

Personal details
- Born: July 11, 1905 Ann Arbor, Michigan
- Died: December 8, 2000 (aged 95) Ann Arbor, Michigan
- Education: University of Michigan (B.A.)

Neil Oliver Staebler (July 11, 1905 – December 8, 2000) was an American politician from the U.S. state of Michigan.

Staebler had German ancestry. He was born in Ann Arbor, Michigan and graduated from Ann Arbor High School in 1922. He received a B.A. from the University of Michigan at Ann Arbor in 1926. He served on the staff of the Office of Price Administration, 1942–1943, and in the United States Navy, 1943–1945. He was chairman, of the Michigan state Democratic central committee, 1950–1961 and a member of the Democratic National Committee, 1961–1964 and 1965–1968. He was a visiting professor at the University of Massachusetts in 1962. He was a delegate to the Democratic National Convention from Michigan in 1952, 1956, 1960, 1964, and 1968.

Following the 1960 census, Michigan gained one additional seat in Congress due to reapportionment. Despite this change, the state legislature did not create the new 19th district in time for the 1962 elections, so Staebler was elected as an at-large candidate from the Democratic Party to represent Michigan in the 88th Congress, serving from January 3, 1963, to January 3, 1965. He did not pursue reelection in 1964, but instead unsuccessfully challenged incumbent Republican Governor of Michigan George W. Romney.

He was a member of the Federal Election Commission from April 1975 to October 1978. Staebler died in Ann Arbor from the effects of Alzheimer's disease.

== Family ==
Staebler's father, Edward W. Staebler, was mayor of Ann Arbor from 1927 to 1931.

Staebler's grandson, Ned Staebler, is the chief executive of TechTown, a high-tech business incubator in Detroit, and was a candidate in the primary for Michigan state house of representatives in the 53rd district in 2010.

Staebler's great-granddaughter is novelist Claire Schultz.

== Sources ==
- United States Congress. "Neil Staebler (id: S000775)". Biographical Directory of the United States Congress.
- U.S. Representatives 1837-2003, Michigan Manual 2003-2004

Party political offices
| Preceded by John Swainson | Democratic nominee for Governor of Michigan; 1964 | Succeeded by Zolton Ferency |
U.S. House of Representatives
| Preceded by None | United States Representative at-large from Michigan; 1963 – 1965 | Succeeded by None |
