= Isaac E. Crary =

American politician

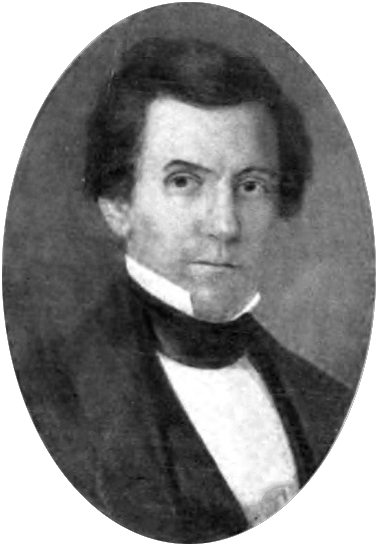

11th Speaker of the Michigan House of Representatives
- In office 1846–1846
- Preceded by: Alfred H. Hanscom
- Succeeded by: George Washington Peck

Member of the Michigan House of Representatives from the Calhoun district
- In office January 3, 1842 – May 18, 1846
- Preceded by: Charles Olin

Member of the U.S. House of Representatives from Michigan's at-large district
- In office January 26, 1837 – March 3, 1841
- Preceded by: Statehood
- Succeeded by: Jacob M. Howard

Personal details
- Born: October 2, 1804 Preston, Connecticut, US
- Died: May 8, 1854 (aged 49) Marshall, Michigan, US
- Resting place: Oakridge Cemetery, Marshall, Michigan
- Party: Jacksonian Democrats (before 1836); Democratic (from 1836)
- Education: Trinity College

Isaac Edwin Crary (October 2, 1804 – May 8, 1854) was an American lawyer and politician. He was the first elected U.S. representative from the state of Michigan. He served in the Michigan House of Representatives including as Speaker.

== Early life ==
Crary was born in Preston, Connecticut, where he attended the public schools and graduated from Trinity College, Hartford, in its first class in 1827. He studied law, was admitted to the bar, and commenced practice in Hartford. During this time he was also assistant editor of the New England Weekly Review. He moved to Marshall, Michigan, in 1833.

== Career ==
Crary was a delegate to the state constitutional convention in 1835 and upon the admission of Michigan as a state into the Union, he was elected on October 5 and 6, 1835, as a Jacksonian to the Twenty-fourth Congress. Due to Michigan's dispute with Ohio over the Toledo Strip (see the Toledo War), Congress refused to accept his credentials and he was seated as a delegate until Congress admitted Michigan as a state of the Union on January 26, 1837. He was re-elected as a Democrat to the Twenty-fifth and Twenty-sixth Congresses, and served until March 3, 1841.

In 1840, during the William Henry Harrison 1840 presidential campaign, on February 14, 1840, as the House of Representatives debated funding for the Cumberland Road, Crary essayed an attack on Harrison's record as a Native Ameeican fighter, deeming him a bogus hero. Crary sat down to applause from his fellow Democrats. The next day, Ohio's Thomas Corwin, known as a humorist, rose in the House, and depicted Crary, a militia general in his home state, having to deal with the terrors of the militia's parade day, until afterwards, safe with the survivors, "your general unsheathes his trenchant blade ... and with an energy and remorseless fury he slices the watermelons that lie in heaps around him." According to longtime Washington journalist Benjamin Perley Poore, Corwin's response to Crary was "one of the most wonderful speeches ever delivered at Washington," leaving the House "convulsed with laughter" at Crary's expense. As word of Corwin's speech reached newspapers in February and March, there was much amusement across the nation; Crary failed to be renominated to Congress.

He served as regent of the University of Michigan from 1837 to 1844, and with John D. Pierce wrote the education article of the 1835 constitution. Crary was appointed a member of the State board of education from 1820 to 1852. Crary and Pierce planned Michigan's public school system and established a separate department of education run by a superintendent, introducing uniform schooling in Michigan.

He was editor of the Marshall Expounder for several years and a member of the Michigan House of Representatives from 1842 to 1846, serving as speaker of the house in 1846.

== Death ==
Crary's grave at Oakridge Cemetery

Crary died in Marshall, Michigan and is interred at Oakridge Cemetery in Marshall.

== Legacy ==
Isaac E. Crary Elementary School in Detroit, Michigan and Isaac E. Crary Middle School in Waterford, Michigan were named in his honor.

U.S. House of Representatives
Preceded by None	Member of the U.S. House of Representatives from Michigan's at-large congressional district January 26, 1837 – March 3, 1841	Succeeded by Jacob M. Howard
