= Alfred H. Hanscom =

American politician

United States Consul to Rio Grande do Sul
- In office 1854–1857

Speaker of the Michigan House of Representatives
- In office 1845–1845
- Preceded by: Edwin H. Lothrop
- Succeeded by: Isaac E. Crary

Member of the Michigan House of Representatives from the Oakland County district
- In office January 3, 1842 – 1842
- In office 1845–1845

Personal details
- Born: 1819 Rochester, New York
- Died: c. 1880 Ontonagon County, Michigan
- Party: Democratic
- Spouse(s): Jane A. Forsythe (1838); Adelia Weller (1859)

Alfred Henry Hanscom (1819 – c. 1880) was a state legislator in Michigan who served in the Michigan House of Representatives. He served as the Speaker of the Michigan House of Representatives in 1845.

== Early life ==
Hanscom was born in 1819 in Rochester, New York to parents Sarah and George George Hansom.

== Career ==
Hanscom served as a member of the Michigan House of Representatives from the Oakland County district in 1842 and then again in 1845. During his term as 1845, he also held the position of Speaker of the Michigan House of Representatives. Hanscom was a delegate to Michigan state constitutional convention of 1850. Hanscom was the United States Consul to Rio Grande do Sul from 1854 to 1857.

== Personal life ==
Hanscom married Jane A. Forsythe in 1838. Later, on August 12, 1859, he married Adelia Weller.

== Death ==
Hanscom moved to Ontonagon County, Michigan around 1850, and then died around thirty years later.
