= Robert McClelland (American politician) =

American politician (1807–80)

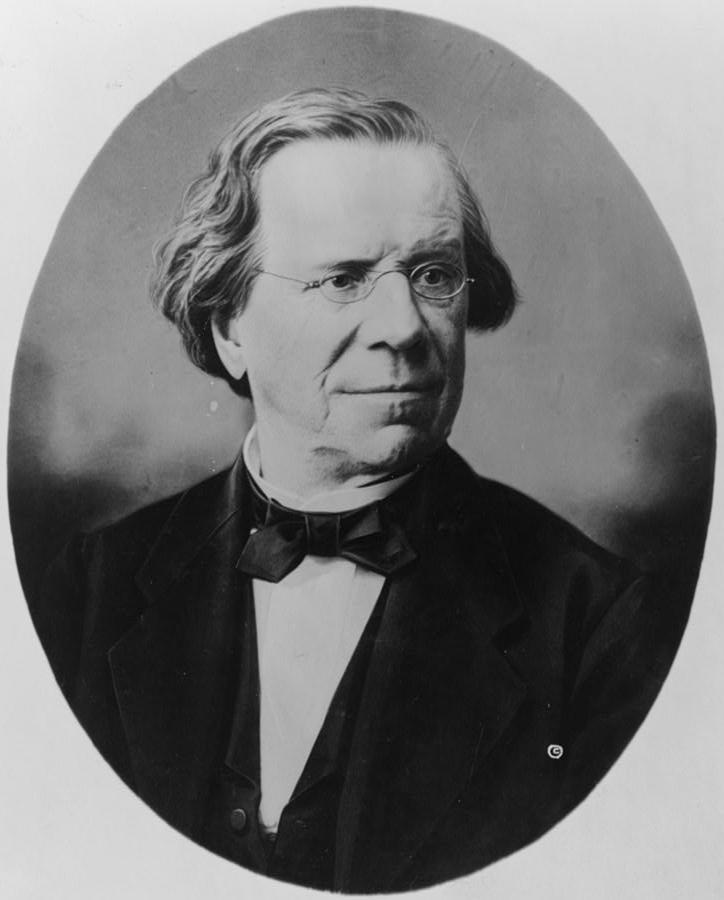

4th United States Secretary of the Interior
- In office March 8, 1853 – March 9, 1857
- President: Franklin Pierce; James Buchanan
- Preceded by: Alexander Stuart
- Succeeded by: Jacob Thompson

9th Governor of Michigan
- In office January 1, 1852 – March 7, 1853
- Lieutenant: Calvin Britain; Andrew Parsons
- Preceded by: John S. Barry
- Succeeded by: Andrew Parsons

Member of the U.S. House of Representatives from Michigan's 1st district
- In office March 4, 1843 – March 3, 1849
- Preceded by: District established
- Succeeded by: Alexander W. Buel

Speaker of the Michigan House of Representatives
- In office 1843
- Preceded by: Kinsley S. Bingham
- Succeeded by: Edwin H. Lothrop

Personal details
- Born: August 1, 1807 Greencastle, Pennsylvania, U.S.
- Died: August 30, 1880 (aged 73) Detroit, Michigan, U.S.
- Party: Democratic
- Spouse: Sarah Sabine
- Education: Dickinson College (BA)

Robert McClelland (August 1, 1807 – August 30, 1880) was an American statesman, serving as a U.S. representative from Michigan, the ninth governor of Michigan, and as the U.S. secretary of the interior.

== Early life in Pennsylvania ==
He was born in Greencastle, Pennsylvania, the son of a prominent Franklin County doctor. He entered Dickinson College at Carlisle, Pennsylvania, and graduated among the top of his class in 1829. He studied law and was admitted to the Pennsylvania bar in 1831 and practiced law in Pittsburgh for a short time before moving in 1833 to Monroe in what was then the Territory of Michigan.

== Life and politics in Michigan ==
McClelland became a member of the Michigan bar and established a successful law practice in Monroe, and he was a member of the constitutional convention in 1835. After Michigan became a state, Governor Stevens T. Mason offered the positions of state Bank Commissioner and state Attorney General, both of which he declined in order to develop his private practice, although he maintained an active role in the new state's Democratic Party. In 1836, McClelland married Sarah Elizabeth Sabine, with whom he had six children.

McClelland served on the board of regents of the University of Michigan in 1837 and again in 1850. He represented Monroe County in the Michigan House of Representatives in 1838, 1840 and was speaker of the house in 1843. He served as the mayor of Monroe in 1841. He was elected in 1842 as U.S. Representative from Michigan's 1st congressional district, serving from 1843 to 1849 in the 28th, 29th, and 30th congresses. Going against the general opinion of the Democratic Party, he was a strong advocate of the Wilmot Proviso, which would have restricted the spread of slavery to new states. He was active in supporting his friend Lewis Cass's unsuccessful run for president in 1848 and did not seek reelection in that year.

McClelland played a prominent role in the Michigan's constitutional convention of 1850. Due to changes adopted in that constitution, he was elected to a one-year term as Governor of Michigan in 1851. He was re-elected to a full two-year term in 1852. During his tenure, he softened his support of the Wilmot Proviso and instead urged support for the Compromise of 1850. He played a prominent role at the national Democratic convention of 1852. He resigned as governor in March 1853 to become the Secretary of the Interior under Franklin Pierce, and was succeeded by his second Lieutenant Governor Andrew Parsons.

== Retirement and death ==
Following the inauguration of James Buchanan in 1857, McClelland retired from public office and began a private law practice in Detroit. In 1867, he briefly returned to public service as a member of the Michigan constitutional convention.

In September 1861, former president Franklin Pierce traveled to Monroe County and Detroit Michigan, visiting Robert McClelland; former senator Lewis Cass.

McClelland died in Detroit at the age of 73, and is interred at Elmwood Cemetery.

His former residence at 47 East Elm Avenue in Monroe, Michigan, was listed on the National Register of Historic Places in 1971 as the Governor Robert McClelland House, and is today privately owned.

Political offices
Preceded by Kinsley S. Bingham	Speaker of the Michigan House of Representatives; 1843	Succeeded by Edwin H. Lothrop
Preceded by John S. Barry	Governor of Michigan; 1852–1853	Succeeded by Andrew Parsons
Preceded by Alexander Stuart	United States Secretary of the Interior; 1853–1857	Succeeded by Jacob Thompson
U.S. House of Representatives
Preceded by Jacob M. Howard; At-Large	Member of the U.S. House of Representatives from Michigan's 1st congressional district 1843–1849	Succeeded by Alexander W. Buel
Preceded by Isaac E. Holmes	Chair of the House Commerce Committee; 1845–1847	Succeeded by Washington Hunt
Party political offices
Preceded by John S. Barry	Democratic nominee for Governor of Michigan; 1851, 1852	Succeeded by John S. Barry
