= Andrew Parsons (American politician) =

American politician (1817–1855)

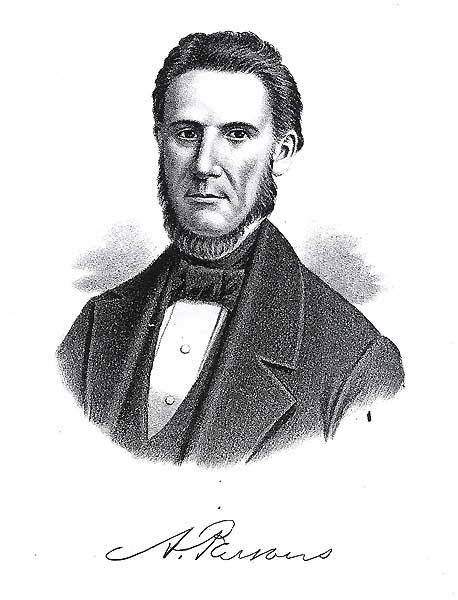

10th Governor of Michigan
- In office March 8, 1853 – January 3, 1855
- Lieutenant: George Griswold
- Preceded by: Robert McClelland
- Succeeded by: Kinsley S. Bingham

9th Lieutenant Governor of Michigan
- In office 1853
- Governor: Robert McClelland
- Preceded by: Calvin Britain
- Succeeded by: George Griswold

Member of the Michigan Senate from the 6th district
- In office 1847–1848

Personal details
- Born: July 22, 1817 Hoosick, New York
- Died: June 6, 1855 (aged 37) Corunna, Michigan
- Party: Democratic
- Spouse: Marrietta Clason

Andrew Parsons (July 22, 1817 – June 6, 1855) was an American politician from the U.S. state of Michigan. He served as the 9th lieutenant governor of Michigan and as the 10th governor of Michigan. Parsons was the last Democratic Governor of Michigan until Josiah Begole took office in 1883.

== Early life in New York ==
Parsons was born in Hoosick, New York. He was the son of John Parsons, and the grandson of Andrew Parsons, a Revolutionary soldier, who was the son of Phineas Parsons, the son of Samuel Parsons.

== Life and politics in Michigan ==
Parsons moved to Michigan Territory in 1835 and spent the summer teaching in Ann Arbor. In the fall, he explored nearly the entire length of the Grand River valley by canoe, from Jackson to Lake Michigan. He spent the winter working as a store clerk in Ionia County and in the spring went to Marshall to live with his brother, Luke H. Parsons. In the fall of 1836, he moved to Corunna in what was to become Shiawassee County. This area at that time was mostly wilderness, and when it was organized into a county in 1837, Parsons was elected the county's first clerk at the age of nineteen.

Parsons became an attorney, and in 1840 was elected Register of Deeds, then reelected in 1842 and 1844. In 1846, he was elected to the Michigan State Senate from the sixth district and was appointed Prosecuting Attorney in 1848. He became a Regent of the University of Michigan in 1851 and was also elected as ninth lieutenant governor of Michigan in 1852.

Parsons became the tenth governor of Michigan when Robert McClelland resigned in March 1853 to become the Secretary of the Interior under U.S. President Franklin Pierce. During his twenty-two months as governor, tax laws were improved and the practice of depositing surplus state funds in banks was opposed. Parsons did not receive the Democratic Party's nomination for governor in 1854. This may have been because the party was split by the question of slavery and by the formation of the Republican Party (which held its first convention that year in Jackson, Michigan).

== Retirement and death ==
In 1855, Parsons was elected to the Michigan House of Representatives from Shiawassee County district. He soon fell ill and retired to his farm in Corunna where he died at the age of 37, just five months after leaving office as governor. He is interred at Pinetree Cemetery in Corunna.

He was married to Marrietta Clason and had four children.

His brother, S. Titus Parsons, years later, was also a member of the state house from the same district from 1863 to 1864 and 1867–68, as well as a delegate to Michigan state constitutional convention in 1867.

Political offices
| Preceded by Calvin Britain | Lieutenant Governor of Michigan; 1853 | Succeeded by George Griswold |
| Preceded by Robert McClelland | Governor of Michigan; 1853–1855 | Succeeded by Kinsley S. Bingham |
