= William L. Greenly =

American politician

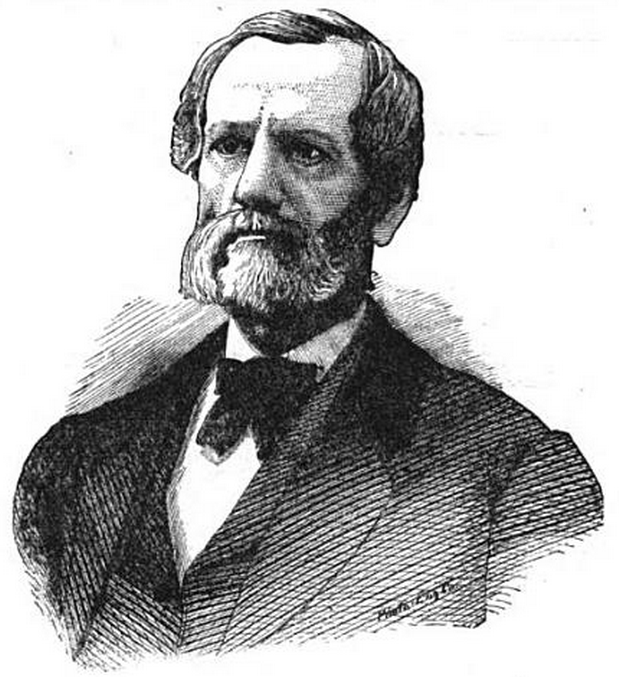

6th Governor of Michigan
- In office March 4, 1847 – January 3, 1848
- Lieutenant: Charles P. Bush
- Preceded by: Alpheus Felch
- Succeeded by: Epaphroditus Ransom

5th Lieutenant Governor of Michigan
- In office 1846–1847
- Governor: Alpheus Felch
- Preceded by: Origen D. Richardson
- Succeeded by: Charles P. Bush

Member of the Michigan Senate
- In office 1842–1843
- Constituency: 3rd district
- In office 1839–1840
- Constituency: 2nd district

Personal details
- Born: September 18, 1813 Hamilton, New York, US
- Died: November 29, 1883 (aged 70) Adrian, Michigan, US
- Resting place: Oakwood Cemetery, Adrian, Michigan
- Party: Democratic
- Spouse(s): Sarah A. Dascomb Greenly; Elizabeth W. Hubbard Greenly; Maria Hart Greenly
- Children: Marshal Greenly

William Lawrence Greenly (September 18, 1813 – November 29, 1883) was a politician from the U.S. state of Michigan; he served as the sixth governor of Michigan.

== Early life in New York ==
Greenly was born in Hamilton, New York. He graduated from Union College of Schenectady, New York in 1831, then studied law with Stower & Gridley in Hamilton and was admitted to the bar at Albany, New York in 1834.

== Politics in Michigan ==
Greenly moved to Adrian, Michigan in October 1836. He served as a member of the Michigan State Senate from the 2nd district from 1839 to 1840, and from the 3rd district from 1842 to 1843.

Greenly served as the fifth lieutenant governor of Michigan from 1846 to 1847 and became governor on March 4, 1847, after the resignation of Alpheus Felch to take a seat in the U.S. Senate. He completed Felch's term through January 3, 1848. Greenly served through much of the Mexican–American War, where troops from Michigan were sent such as Company K, 3d Dragoons, as well as A, E, and G of the U. S. Infantry.

== Retirement and death ==
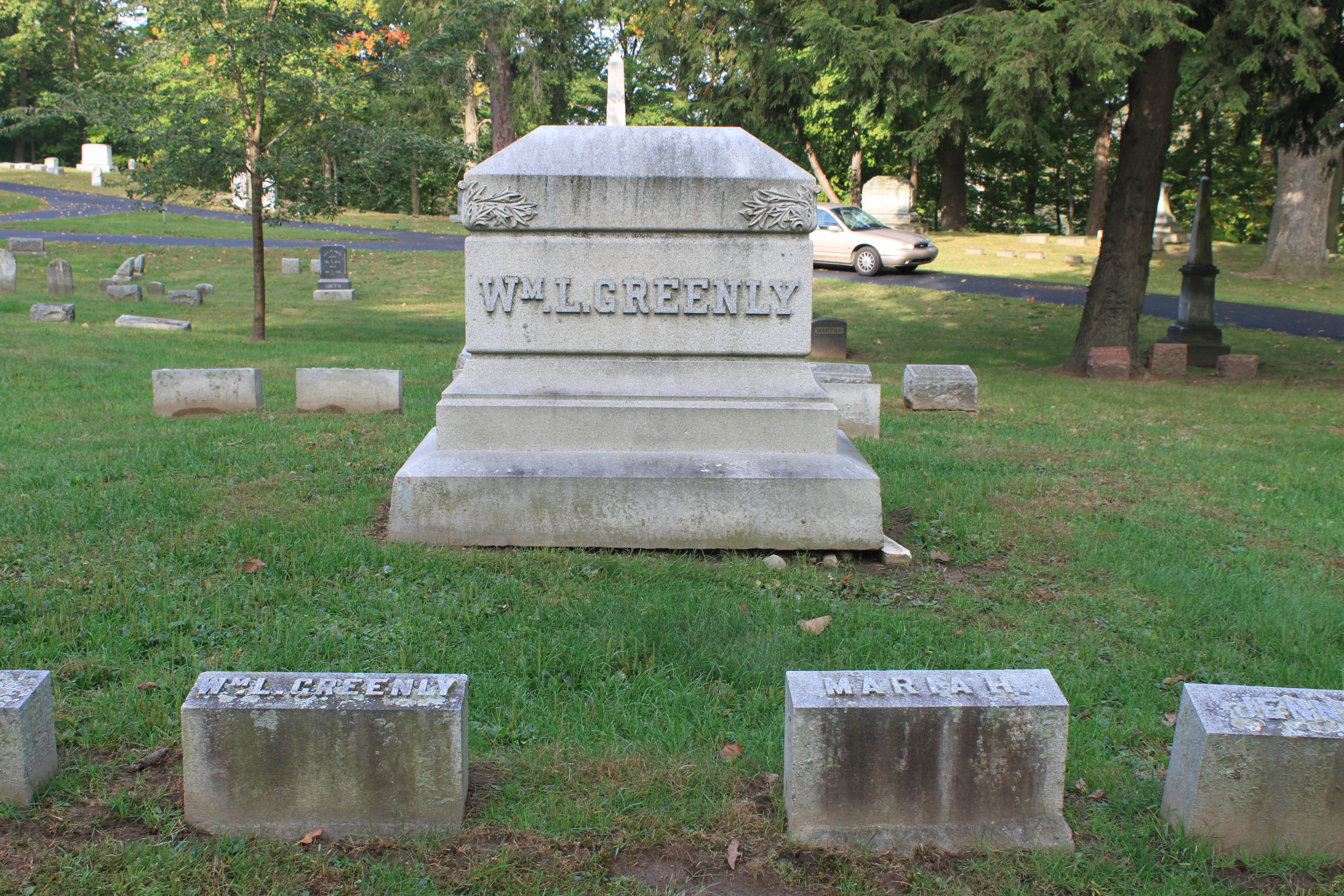
Greenly grave

After his brief time as governor, Greenly served as justice of the peace for 12 years. He was elected mayor of Adrian, Michigan in 1858, serving only one year. Greenly died on November 29, 1883 in Adrian at the age of 70. He is interred at Oakwood Cemetery in Adrian.

== Family life ==
Governor Greenly was married three times. He married Sarah A. Dascomb in Hamilton, New York in December 1834. Following her death, he married Elizabeth W. Hubbard in Northampton, Massachusetts, on June 11, 1840. He and Elizabeth had one son, Marshal. Following Elizabeth's death, he married Maria Hart in Adrian, Michigan, on October 25, 1859

Political offices
| Preceded by Origen D. Richardson | Lieutenant Governor of Michigan; 1846–1847 | Succeeded by Charles P. Bush |
| Preceded by Alpheus Felch | Governor of Michigan; 1847–1848 | Succeeded by Epaphroditus Ransom |
