= James Wright Gordon =

American politician

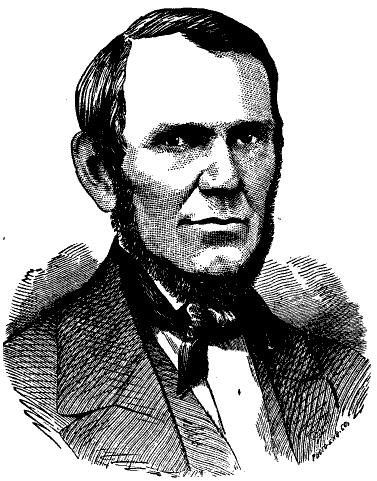

3rd Governor of Michigan
- In office February 23, 1841 – January 3, 1842
- Lieutenant: Thomas J. Drake
- Preceded by: William Woodbridge
- Succeeded by: John S. Barry

2nd Lieutenant Governor of Michigan
- In office January 7, 1840 – February 23, 1841
- Governor: William Woodbridge
- Preceded by: Edward Mundy
- Succeeded by: Thomas J. Drake

Member of the Michigan Senate from the 6th district
- In office 1839
- Succeeded by: Henry P. Bridge

Personal details
- Born: 1809 Plainfield, Connecticut, US
- Died: December 23, 1853 (aged 43–44) Pernambuco, Brazil
- Party: Whig

James Wright Gordon (1809 – December 23, 1853), usually referred to as J. Wright Gordon, was a Whig politician from the U.S. state of Michigan.

== Life and politics in Michigan ==
Gordon was born in Plainfield, Connecticut and studied law at Harvard University.

He later moved to Michigan, establishing a practice in Marshall, and also lived for a time in Battle Creek. He was a member of the Michigan State Senate (6th district) in 1839 and served as the second lieutenant governor of Michigan from 1840 to 1841.

Gordon became the third governor of Michigan ex officio, when William Woodbridge resigned on February 23, 1841, to become a U.S. Senator. He completed the remainder of Woodbridge's term until January 3, 1842.

He ran unsuccessfully for U.S. Representative from Michigan's 2nd congressional district in 1846 and 1847, defeated by John Smith Chipman.

== Death in Brazil ==
Gordon was appointed the U.S. consul in Pernambuco, Brazil, in January 1850 by President Zachary Taylor. At the time of his appointment, his health was failing, and it was thought the climate in Brazil could restore it. He served as consul until his death on December 23, 1853, when he accidentally fell to his death from a balcony.

Political offices
Preceded by Edward Mundy	Lieutenant Governor of Michigan; 1840–1841	Succeeded by Thomas J. Drake
Preceded by William Woodbridge	Governor of Michigan; 1841–1842	Succeeded by John S. Barry
