= Alpheus Felch =

American judge & politician (1804–1896)

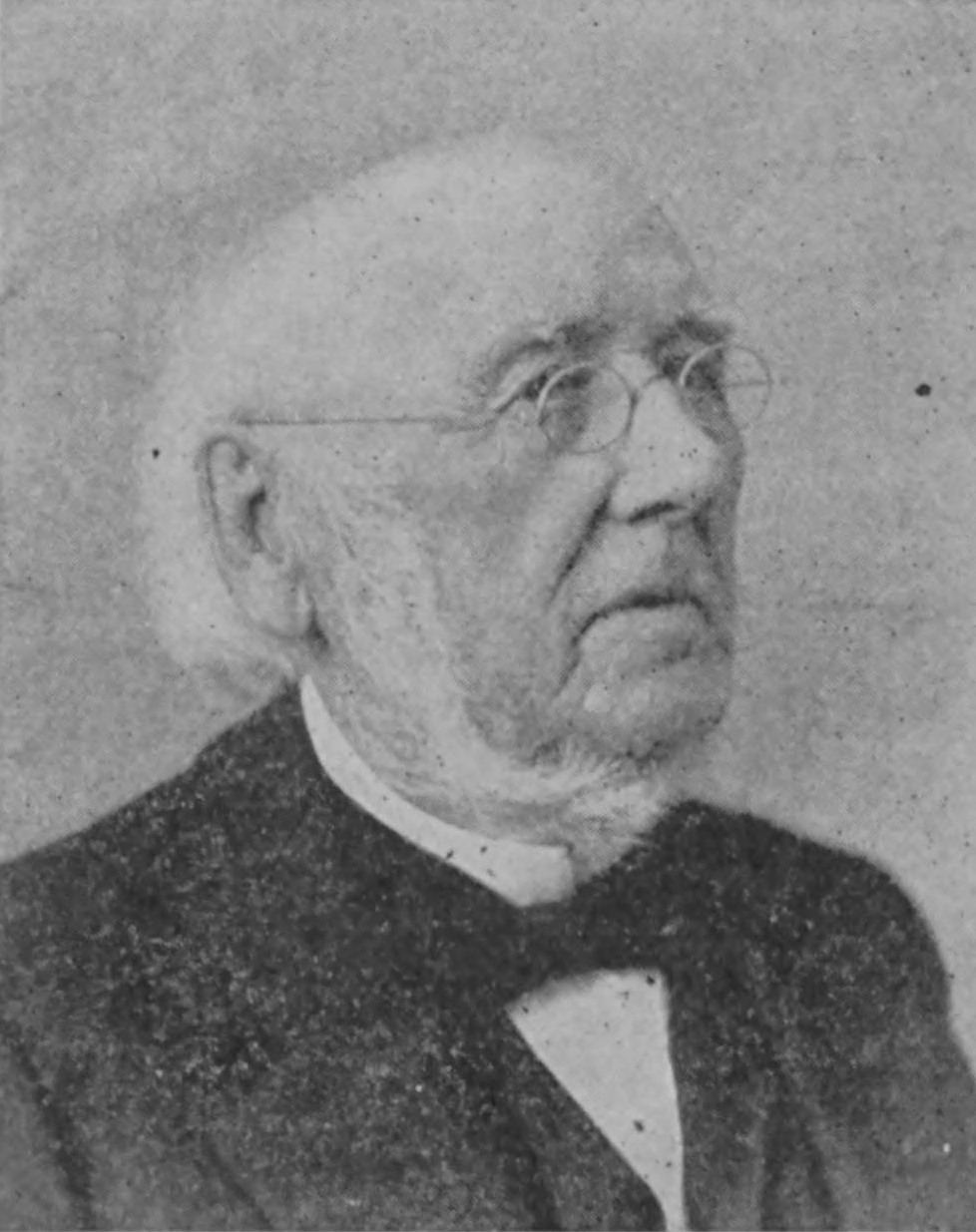

United States Senator from Michigan
- In office March 4, 1847 – March 3, 1853
- Preceded by: William Woodbridge
- Succeeded by: Charles E. Stuart

5th Governor of Michigan
- In office January 5, 1846 – March 3, 1847
- Lieutenant: William L. Greenly
- Preceded by: John S. Barry
- Succeeded by: William L. Greenly

Michigan Auditor General
- In office 1842
- Governor: John S. Barry
- Preceded by: Eurotus P. Hastings
- Succeeded by: Henry L. Whipple

Member of the Michigan House of Representatives
- In office 1835–1837

Personal details
- Born: September 28, 1804 Limerick, Massachusetts (now Limerick, Maine, US)
- Died: June 13, 1896 (aged 91) Ann Arbor, Michigan, US
- Party: Democratic
- Spouse: Lucretia W. Lawrence
- Children: 4
- Education: Bowdoin College
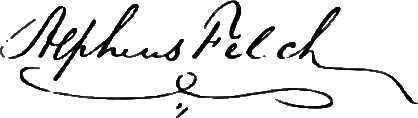
- Signature

Alpheus Felch (September 28, 1804 – June 13, 1896) was the fifth governor of Michigan and a U.S. senator from Michigan.

== Early life ==
Felch was born in Limerick (in modern-day Maine, then a part of Massachusetts). He was orphaned at the age of three and lived with his grandfather Abijah Felch, a veteran of the American Revolution.

He attended Phillips Exeter Academy in Exeter, New Hampshire, and graduated from Bowdoin College, Brunswick, Maine, in 1827. He studied law and was admitted to the bar in Bangor, Maine, and practiced in Houlton, Maine, from 1830 to 1833.

== Political career ==
Felch moved to Monroe, Michigan, in 1833, and continued the practice of law. In 1835 he was the aid-de-camp to General Joseph Brown during the mustering of troops for the Ohio–Michigan Boundary Dispute (the Toledo War). He was elected three times to the Michigan State House of Representatives, serving from 1835 to 1837. He was appointed state bank commissioner in 1838 and resigned in 1839. As bank commissioner, he did much to expose fraud which had been made possible by a general wildcat banking law which he had opposed, and which was afterward declared unconstitutional by the Michigan Supreme Court. He was state auditor general for a few weeks in 1842, before being appointed associate justice of the Michigan Supreme Court in 1842, where he served until his resignation in 1845, after being elected governor. He served as governor of Michigan from 1846 to 1847. During those fourteen months, state statutes were amended and the state capital was relocated to Lansing.

Felch resigned as governor on March 3, 1847, after being elected by the Michigan legislature as a Democrat to the United States Senate. He served in the 30th, 31st and 32nd Congresses, from March 4, 1847 to March 3, 1853. In the U.S. Senate, he was chairman of the committee on public lands for four years.

In March 1853, he was appointed by U.S. President Franklin Pierce to the land claims commission for California to settle Spanish and Mexican land claims arising from the Treaty of Guadalupe Hidalgo which ended the Mexican–American War. He served as president of the commission until 1856.

He returned to live in Ann Arbor, Michigan that year, and made an unsuccessful attempt at a non-consecutive term as governor against the Republican incumbent Kinsley S. Bingham. He resumed his law career and served as the Tappan Professor of Law at the University of Michigan from 1879 to 1883.

== Death and legacy ==
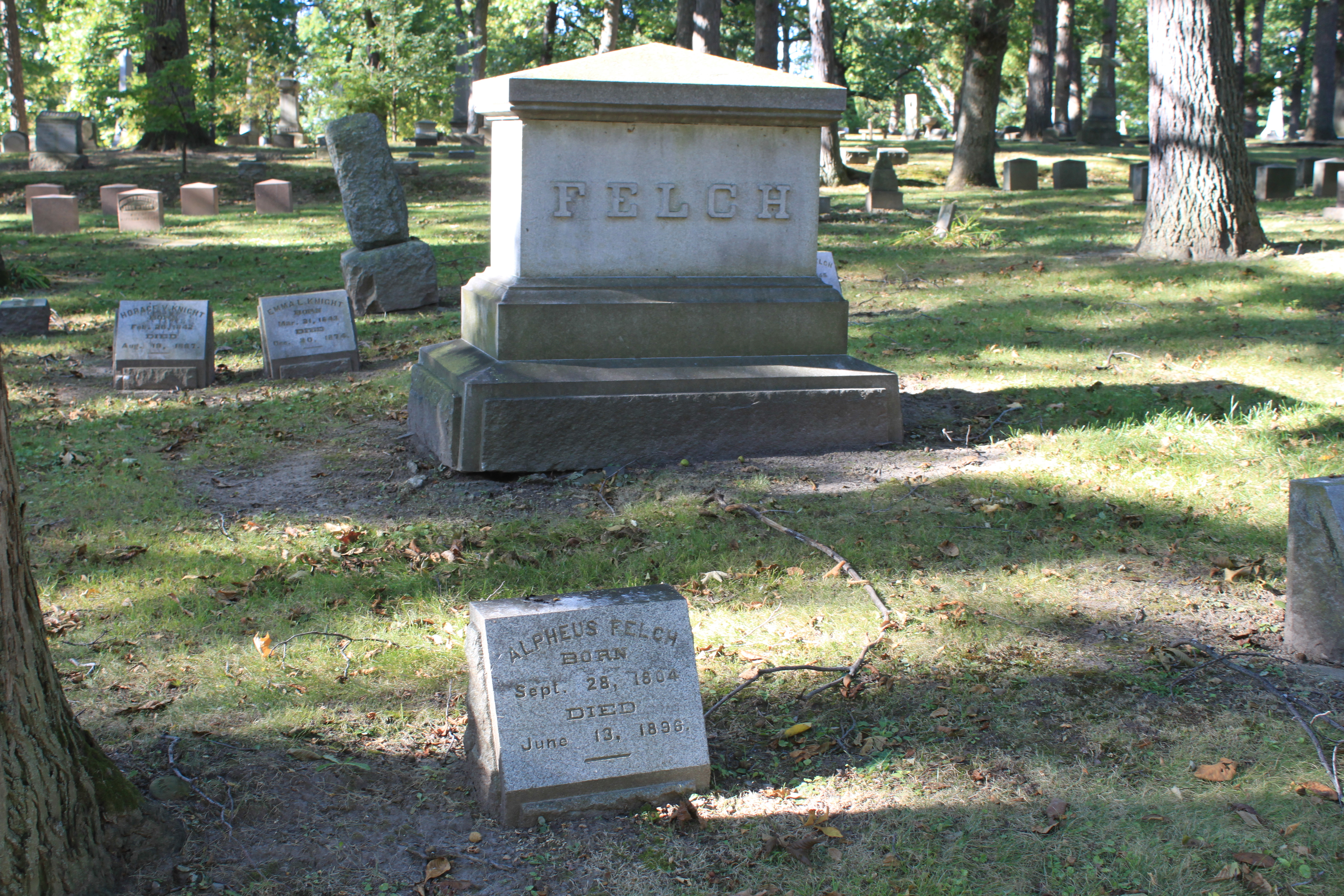
Felch grave

Felch died at his home in Ann Arbor, Michigan at the age of 91, and is interred at Forest Hill Cemetery along with his wife, Lucretia.

Alpheus Felch is the namesake of Felch Township, Michigan. Felch Park, on the University of Michigan campus, is also named for him.

Party political offices
Preceded by John S. Barry	Democratic nominee for Governor of Michigan; 1845	Succeeded by Epaphroditus Ransom
Preceded by John S. Barry	Democratic nominee for Governor of Michigan; 1856	Succeeded by Charles E. Stuart
Political offices
Preceded by Eurotus P. Hastings	Michigan Auditor General; 1842	Succeeded by Henry L. Whipple
Preceded by John S. Barry	Governor of Michigan; 1846–1847	Succeeded by William L. Greenly
U.S. Senate
Preceded by William Woodbridge	U.S. senator (Class 2) from Michigan; 1847–1853; Served alongside: Lewis Cass, Thomas Fitzgerald, Lewis Cass	Succeeded by Charles E. Stuart
Honorary titles
Preceded by Simon Cameron	Most senior living U.S. senator (Sitting or former); June 26, 1889 – June 13, 1896; With: James W. Bradbury	Succeeded by James W. Bradbury
