= Michigan's at-large congressional district =

Former statewide federal office

- Obsolete district
- Created: 1837; 1913; 1963
- Eliminated: 1843; 1915; 1965
- Years active: 1837-1843; 1913-1915; 1963-1965

Michigan's at-large congressional district may refer to a few different occasions when a statewide at-large district was used for elections to the United States House of Representatives from Michigan.

Prior to Michigan's admittance as a state of the Union in 1837, congressional delegates for Michigan Territory were elected from Michigan Territory's at-large congressional district. The first elected U.S. representative from the state was elected October 5 and 6, 1835. However, due to Michigan's dispute with Ohio over the Toledo Strip, Congress refused to accept his credentials until it admitted Michigan to the Union as a state on January 26, 1837.

In 1912, Patrick H. Kelley was elected congressman at-large after Michigan gained one seat due to reapportionment following the 1910 census, but Michigan did not redraw its congressional districts until 1913.

In 1962, Neil Staebler was elected as an at-large candidate after the 1960 census indicated Michigan would gain a seat in the House of Representatives, but the 19th district had not been created at the time of the election.

== List of members representing the district ==
Member	Party	Tenure	Cong ress	Electoral history
District created January 26, 1837
Isaac E. Crary (Marshall)	Democratic	January 26, 1837 – March 3, 1841	24th 25th 26th	Elected in 1835. Re-elected in 1837. Re-elected in 1838. Retired.
Jacob M. Howard (Detroit)	Whig	March 4, 1841 – March 3, 1843	27th	Elected in 1840. Redistricted to the 1st district and lost re-election.
District inactive until after the 1910 United States census.
Patrick H. Kelley (Lansing)	Republican	March 4, 1913 – March 3, 1915	63rd	Elected in 1912. Redistricted to the 6th district.
Seat inactive until after the 1960 United States census.
Neil Staebler (Ann Arbor)	Democratic	January 3, 1963 – January 3, 1965	88th	Elected in 1962. Retired to run for Governor of Michigan.
Seat eliminated January 3, 1965
