= Kinsley S. Bingham =

American politician (1808–1861)

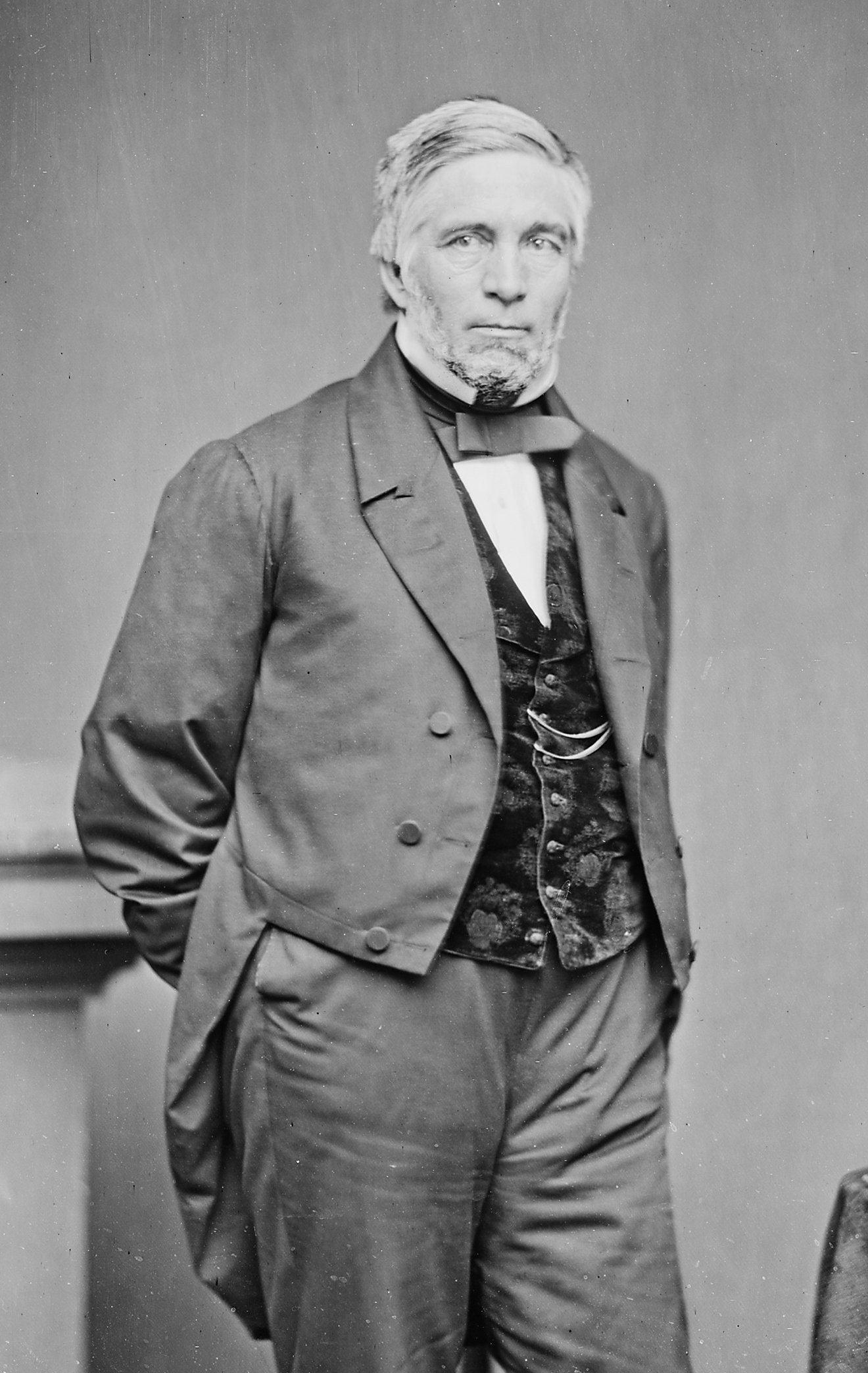

United States Senator from Michigan
- In office March 4, 1859 – October 5, 1861
- Preceded by: Charles E. Stuart
- Succeeded by: Jacob M. Howard

11th Governor of Michigan
- In office January 3, 1855 – January 5, 1859
- Lieutenant: George Coe
- Preceded by: Andrew Parsons
- Succeeded by: Moses Wisner

Member of the U.S. House of Representatives from Michigan's 3rd district
- In office March 4, 1847 – March 3, 1851
- Preceded by: James B. Hunt
- Succeeded by: James L. Conger

Member of the Michigan House of Representatives from the Livingston County district Livingston/Ingham Counties (1841)
- In office 1841–1842 Serving with Charles P. Bush
- Preceded by: Charles P. Bush and Amos E. Steele
- Succeeded by: Charles P. Bush and Ely Barnard

Member of the Michigan House of Representatives from the Livingston and Ingham Counties district Washtenaw County (1837)
- In office 1837–1839 Serving with O. Howe, O. Kellogg, G. Shattuck, T. Lee, J. Kingsley, R. Purdy, E. Case (1837) Flavius J. B. Crane (Livingston, 1838) Ira Jennings (Livingston/Ingham, 1839)
- Preceded by: R. E. Morse, John Brewer, Rufus Matthews, Orrin Howe, George Howe, Jas. W. Hill, Alanson Crossman
- Succeeded by: Charles P. Bush and Amos E. Steele

Personal details
- Born: December 16, 1808 Camillus, New York
- Died: October 5, 1861 (aged 52) Green Oak Township, Michigan
- Party: Democratic, Free Soil, Republican
- Spouse: 1.Margaret Warden 2.Mary Warden

Kinsley Scott Bingham (December 16, 1808 – October 5, 1861) was a U.S. representative, a U.S. senator, and the 11th governor of Michigan, serving as the first Republican Governor in state history.

== Early life in New York ==
Bingham (whose first name is sometimes spelled Kingsley) was born to the farmer family of Calvin and Betsy (Scott) Bingham in Camillus, New York in Onondaga County. He attended the common schools and studied law in Syracuse. In 1833, while still in New York, Bingham married Margaret Warden, who had recently moved with her brother Robert Warden and family from Scotland.

== Life and politics in Michigan ==
Bingham moved with his wife, in 1833 to Green Oak Township, Michigan where he was admitted to the bar and began a private practice. In 1834, his only child with Margaret, Kinsley W. Bingham (1838–1908), was born and his wife died four days later. He engaged in agricultural pursuits and held a number of local offices including justice of the peace, postmaster, and first judge of the probate court of Livingston County.

Bingham became a member of the Michigan State House of Representatives in 1837, was reelected four times and served as speaker of the house in 1838–1839, and 1842. In 1839, Bingham married Mary Warden, the younger sister of his first wife, and in 1840 their only child was born, James W. Bingham (1840–1862).

In 1846, he was elected as a Democratic Representative from Michigan's 3rd congressional district to the 30th and 31st Congresses, serving from March 4, 1847 to March 3, 1851. He was chairman of the Committee on Expenditures in the Department of State in the 31st Congress. He was instrumental in securing approval for building the Beaver Island Head Lighthouse on the south end of Beaver Island in Lake Michigan. He was strongly opposed to the expansion of slavery and was one of minority of Democrats who supported the Wilmot Proviso. Bingham was not a candidate for re-election in 1850 and resumed agricultural pursuits. He affiliated himself with the Free Soil Party and was later a Republican.

== Gubernatorial and senate career ==
In 1854, Bingham was elected as the 11th (and first Republican) governor of Michigan and was re-elected in 1856; he is among the first Republicans to be elected governor of any state. He was known as the farmer-Governor of Michigan and was instrumental in establishing the Agricultural College of the State of Michigan (today, Michigan State University) and other educational institutions such as the State Reform School. Also during his four years in office, a personal liberty law was sanctioned, legislation that regulated the lumber industry was authorized, and several new counties and villages were established. He was also a delegate from Michigan to the Republican National Convention in 1856 that nominated John C. Fremont for U.S. President, who lost to Democrat James Buchanan.

Bingham was elected as a Republican to the United States Senate in 1858 and served in the 36th and 37th Congresses from March 4, 1859, until his death on October 5, 1861. He was chairman of the Committee on Enrolled Bills in the 37th Congress. He campaigned actively for the election of U.S. President Abraham Lincoln in 1860.

== Death and legacy ==
He died in Green Oak while in office at age 52 and was originally interred at a private family graveyard in Livingston County. He was reinterred at Old Village Cemetery of Brighton, Michigan.

There are three townships named for him in Michigan:

- Bingham Township, Clinton County, Michigan
- Bingham Township, Huron County, Michigan
- Bingham Township, Leelanau County, Michigan

== Memorials ==
A painting of Bingham now hangs in the Michigan State Capitol.

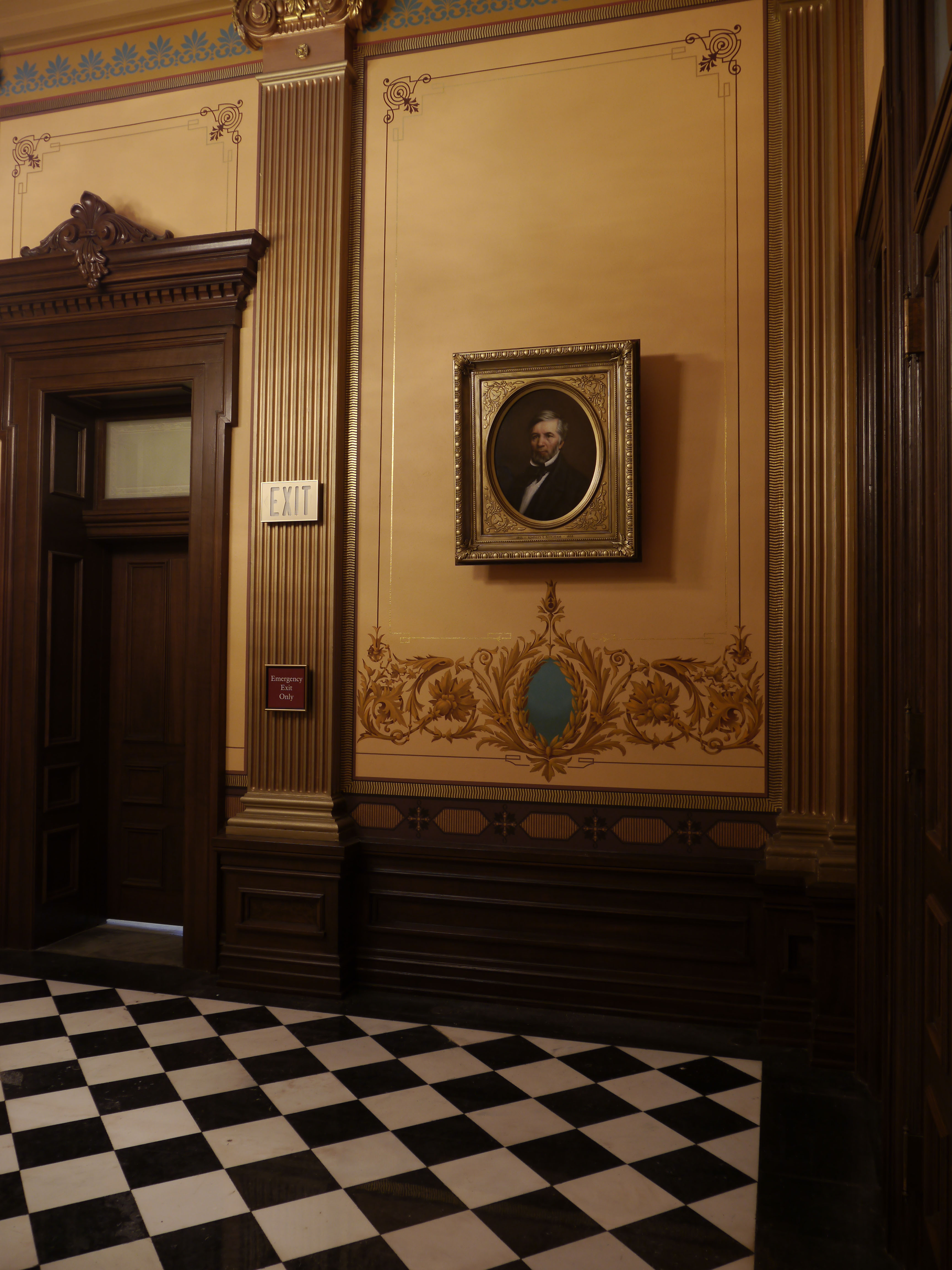
Portrait of Kinsley S, Bingham now hanging in the Michigan State Capitol painted by Joshua Adam Risner in 2016.

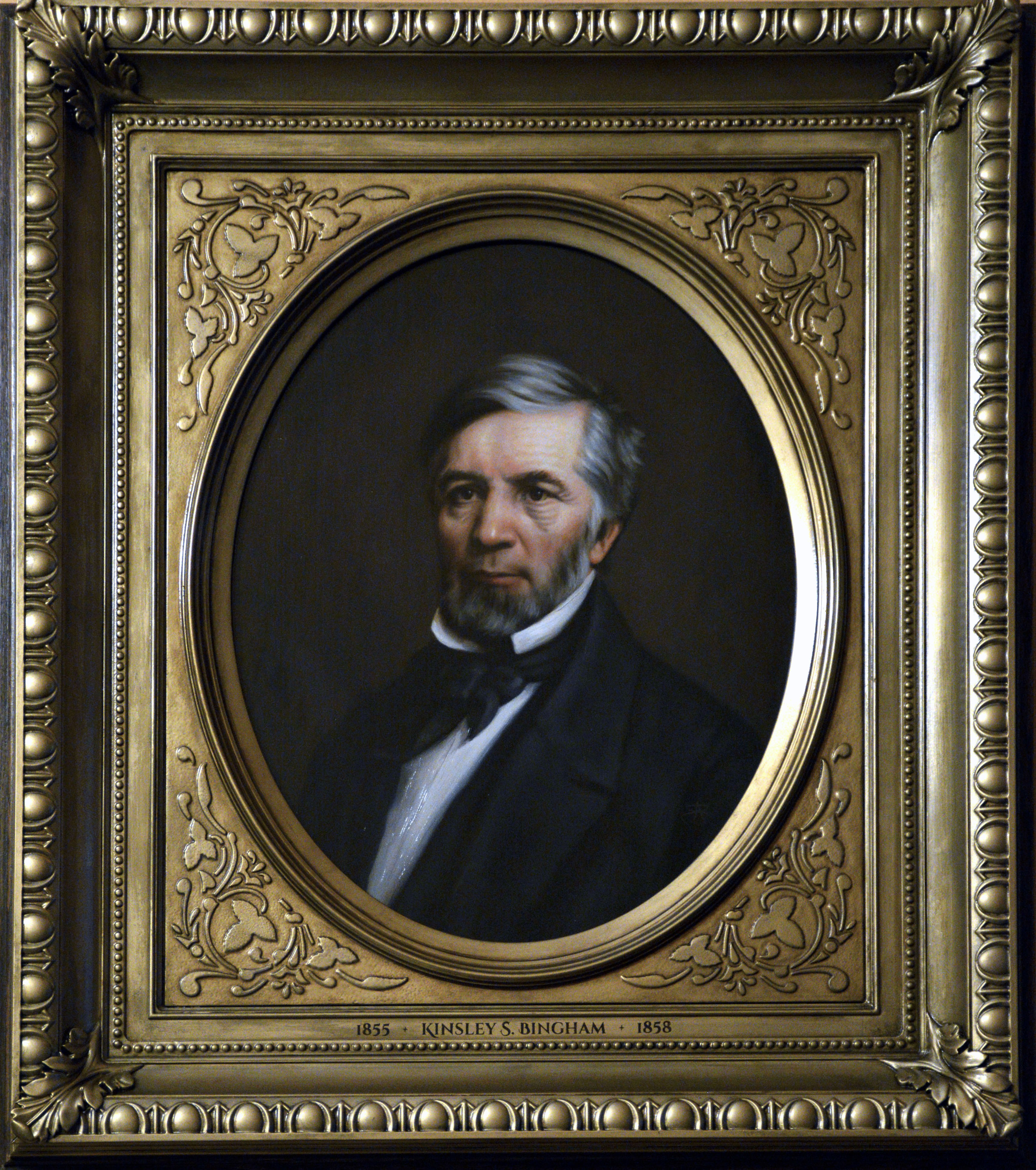
Portrait of Kinsley S, Bingham painted by Joshua Adam Risner in 2016.

== See also ==
- List of members of the United States Congress who died in office (1790–1899)

Party political offices
First	Republican nominee for Governor of Michigan; 1854, 1856	Succeeded by Moses Wisner
U.S. House of Representatives
Preceded by James B. Hunt	United States Representative for the 3rd congressional district of Michigan; 1847–1851	Succeeded by James L. Conger
Political offices
Preceded by Andrew Parsons	Governor of Michigan; 1855–1859	Succeeded by Moses Wisner
U.S. Senate
Preceded by Charles E. Stuart	U.S. senator (Class 2) from Michigan; 1859–1861; Served alongside: Zachariah Chandler	Succeeded by Jacob M. Howard
