= List of governors of Michigan =

Governor of Michigan
- Seal of the governor

- Flag of the governor

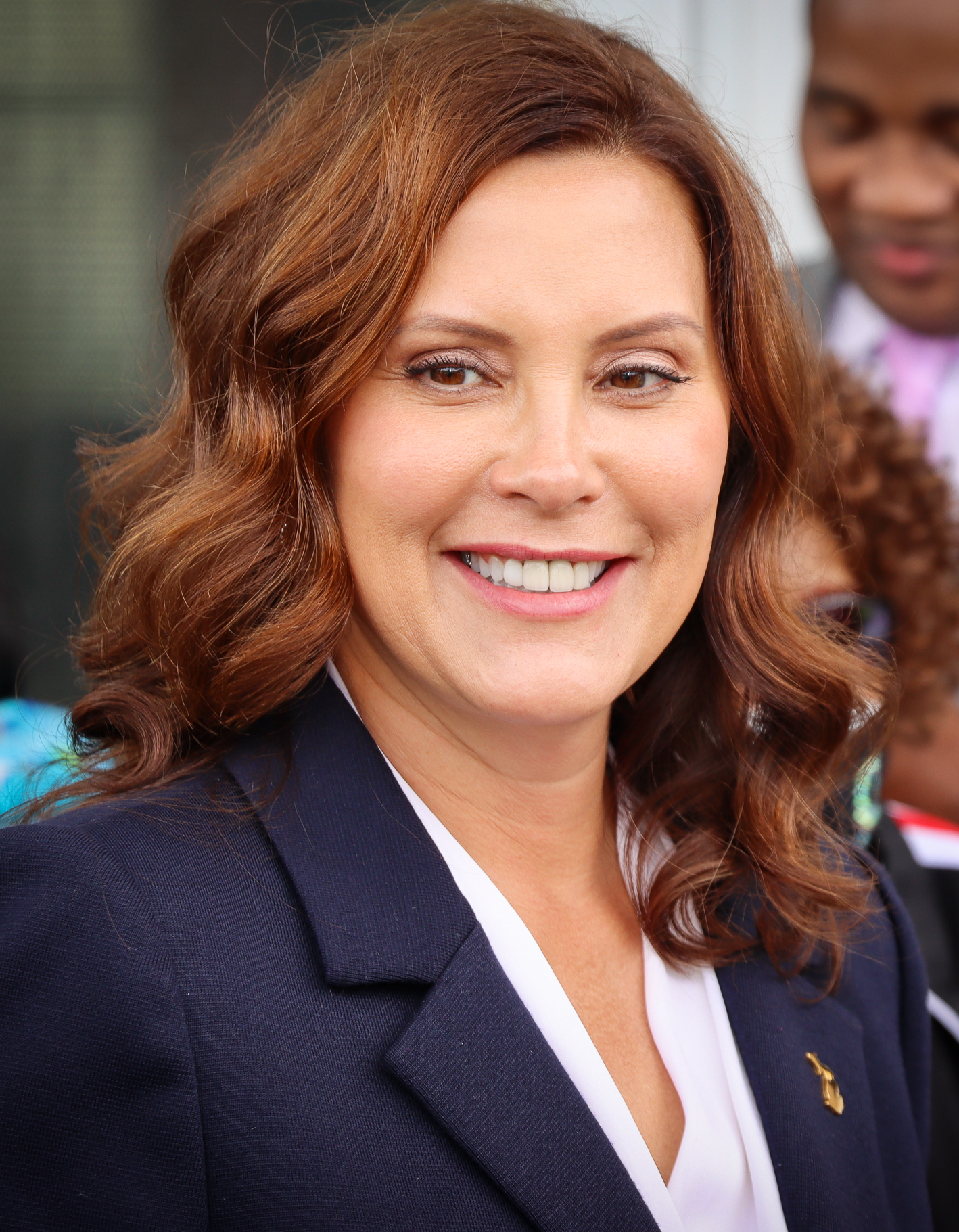
- Incumbent; Gretchen Whitmer since January 1, 2019
- Style: Her Excellency
- Status: Head of state; Head of government
- Residence: Michigan Governor's Mansion
- Term length: Four years, renewable once
- Precursor: Governor of Michigan Territory
- Inaugural holder: Stevens T. Mason
- Formation: November 3, 1835
- Succession: Line of succession
- Deputy: Lieutenant Governor of Michigan
- Salary: $159,300 (2019)
- Website: www.michigan.gov/gov

The governor of Michigan is the head of government of the U.S. state of Michigan. In 1805, the Michigan Territory was created, and five men served as territorial governors, until Michigan was granted statehood in 1837. Forty-seven individuals have held the position of state governor. The first female governor, Jennifer Granholm, served from 2003 to 2011. The longest-serving governor in Michigan's history was William Milliken, who was promoted from lieutenant governor after Governor George W. Romney resigned to become Secretary of Housing and Urban Development, then was elected to three further successive terms. The only governors to serve non-consecutive terms were John S. Barry and Frank Fitzgerald.

== List of governors ==
=== Territory of Michigan ===
Michigan Territory was organized on June 30, 1805, from the north half of Indiana Territory. It had three governors appointed by the president of the United States, including the longest-serving governor of any territory, Lewis Cass, who served for 18 years. During the War of 1812, following the Siege of Detroit and British occupation of Michigan Territory, Colonel Henry Procter was appointed as civil governor.

Governors of the Territory of Michigan
No.	Governor	Term in office (Note: The range given is from the date the governor was confirmed by the Senate, or appointed by the President during a Senate recess, to the date the governor's successor was confirmed, unless noted.)	Appointed by
1	William Hull (1753–1825)	March 1, 1805 (Note: Hull was nominated on February 26, 1805, confirmed by the Senate on March 1, and took office on July 1. He was reconfirmed by the Senate on March 31, 1808, and January 12, 1811.) – October 29, 1813 (3165 days; replaced) (Note: Hull was court-martialed for surrendering Detroit to the British during the War of 1812, and sentenced to death; that was later commuted. but other sources say he never resigned.)	Thomas Jefferson
1	William Hull (1753–1825)	March 1, 1805 – October 29, 1813 (3165 days; replaced)	James Madison
2	Lewis Cass (1782–1866)	October 29, 1813 (Note: Cass was appointed on October 29, 1813, during a Senate recess; nominated on January 31, 1814; and confirmed by the Senate on February 11, 1814. He was reconfirmed by the Senate on January 21, 1817; January 24, 1820; December 20, 1822; December 22, 1825; and December 24, 1828.) – August 1, 1831 (6486 days; resigned) (Note: Cass resigned, having been appointed United States Secretary of War. He submitted his resignation on July 21, 1831, to take effect on August 1.)	James Madison
2	Lewis Cass (1782–1866)	October 29, 1813 – August 1, 1831 (6486 days; resigned)	James Monroe
2	Lewis Cass (1782–1866)	October 29, 1813 – August 1, 1831 (6486 days; resigned)	John Quincy Adams
3	George Bryan Porter (1791–1834)	August 6, 1831 (Note: Porter was appointed on August 6, 1831, during a Senate recess; nominated on December 7, 1831; and confirmed by the Senate on February 8, 1832. He took office on September 17, 1831.) – July 6, 1834 (1066 days; died in office)	Andrew Jackson
—	Stevens T. Mason (1811–1843)	July 6, 1834 – September 21, 1835 (443 days; replaced) (Note: Henry D. Gilpin was appointed on November 5, 1834, during a Senate recess, but he returned his commission on November 8, without declining it, saying he could not leave his present duties for several weeks. He was nominated on December 10, 1834, but was rejected by the Senate on January 20, 1835. Charles Shaler was then appointed on August 29, 1835, but declined the post. His replacement was finally appointed on September 21, 1835. Mason would win the election to be the first state governor on October 5.)	Territorial secretary acting
—	John S. Horner (1802–1883)	September 21, 1835 – July 3, 1836 (287 days; resigned) (Note: In October 1835, Michigan authorized a state constitution and elected Stevens T. Mason as governor of the new state, although Michigan was not admitted until 1837. Horner was mostly ignored by the people of Michigan, and resigned to be Secretary of Wisconsin Territory in July 1836; the date given is the organization of Wisconsin Territory.)	Territorial secretary acting

=== State of Michigan ===
Michigan was admitted to the Union on January 26, 1837. Under the original constitution of Michigan, governors held the office for a two-year term,, until the 1963 Michigan Constitution changed the term to four years. There was no term limit until a 1992 constitutional amendment imposed a lifetime limit of two terms.

Should the office of governor become vacant, the lieutenant governor becomes governor, followed in order of succession by the secretary of state and the attorney general. Prior to the current constitution, the duties of the office would devolve upon the lieutenant governor, without that person actually becoming governor. Since 1850, the term begins at noon on the January 1 following the election; before, it had no set start date, and terms would last until when their successor was inaugurated, which would be at least the first Monday in January following their election. Since 1963, the governor and lieutenant governor have been elected on the same ticket.

Governors of the State of Michigan
No.	Governor	Term in office	Party	Election	Lt. Governor (Note: Lieutenant governors represented the same party as their governor unless noted.)
1	Stevens T. Mason (1811–1843)	November 3, 1835 – January 7, 1840 (1527 days; retired)	Democratic	1835	Edward Mundy
1	Stevens T. Mason (1811–1843)	November 3, 1835 – January 7, 1840 (1527 days; retired)	Democratic	1837	Edward Mundy
2	William Woodbridge (1780–1861)	January 7, 1840 – February 24, 1841 (415 days; resigned) (Note: Woodbridge resigned, having been elected to the United States Senate. His resignation, dated February 23, was accepted by the Senate on February 24.)	Whig	1839	James Wright Gordon
3	James Wright Gordon (1809–1853)	February 24, 1841 – January 3, 1842 (314 days; retired)	Whig	Succeeded from lieutenant governor	Thomas J. Drake
4	John S. Barry (1802–1870)	January 3, 1842 – January 5, 1846 (1464 days; retired) (Note: Sobel & Raimo write that Barry was term-limited under the terms of the 1835 constitution, but no such limit existed.)	Democratic	1841	Origen D. Richardson
4	John S. Barry (1802–1870)	January 3, 1842 – January 5, 1846 (1464 days; retired)	Democratic	1843	Origen D. Richardson
5	Alpheus Felch (1804–1896)	January 5, 1846 – March 3, 1847 (423 days; resigned) (Note: Felch resigned, having been elected to the United States Senate.)	Democratic	1845	William L. Greenly
6	William L. Greenly (1813–1883)	March 3, 1847 – January 3, 1848 (307 days; retired)	Democratic	Succeeded from lieutenant governor	Charles P. Bush
7	Epaphroditus Ransom (1798–1859)	January 3, 1848 – January 7, 1850 (736 days; retired)	Democratic	1847	William M. Fenton
8	John S. Barry (1802–1870)	January 7, 1850 – January 1, 1852 (725 days; retired)	Democratic	1849	William M. Fenton
9	Robert McClelland (1807–1880)	January 1, 1852 – March 7, 1853 (432 days; resigned) (Note: McClelland resigned, having been confirmed as United States Secretary of the Interior.)	Democratic	1851 (Note: The 1850 constitution adjusted the election schedules, shortening this term to one year.)	Calvin Britain
9	Robert McClelland (1807–1880)	January 1, 1852 – March 7, 1853 (432 days; resigned)	Democratic	1852	Andrew Parsons
10	Andrew Parsons (1817–1855)	March 7, 1853 (Note: Sources are split on when McClelland resigned and Parsons took office, with Sobel & Raimo saying both occurred on March 7, and the Michigan Legislative Manual saying McClelland resigned on March 6, and Parsons took office March 7.) – January 3, 1855 (668 days; retired) (Note: Parsons was instead elected to the Michigan House of Representatives.)	Democratic	Succeeded from lieutenant governor	George Griswold
11	Kinsley S. Bingham (1808–1861)	January 3, 1855 (Note: Sources are consistent that Bingham took office on January 3; however, the constitutional start date was January 1, and one contemporary source does note that he would have been inaugurated on January 1, and delivered his inaugural address on January 3. However, as this is the only source yet found saying so, this article uses January 3.) – January 5, 1859 (1464 days; retired) (Note: Bingham was instead elected to the United States Senate.)	Republican	1854	George Coe
11	Kinsley S. Bingham (1808–1861)	January 3, 1855 – January 5, 1859 (1464 days; retired)	Republican	1856	George Coe
12	Moses Wisner (1815–1863)	January 5, 1859 (Note: Sources are split on if Wisner took office on January 3, or January 5 despite the constitutional start date being January 1.) – January 2, 1861 (729 days; retired)	Republican	1858	Edmund Burke Fairfield
13	Austin Blair (1818–1894)	January 2, 1861 – January 4, 1865 (1464 days; retired)	Republican	1860	James M. Birney (resigned April 3, 1861)
13	Austin Blair (1818–1894)	January 2, 1861 – January 4, 1865 (1464 days; retired)	Republican	1860	Joseph R. Williams (died June 15, 1861)
13	Austin Blair (1818–1894)	January 2, 1861 – January 4, 1865 (1464 days; retired)	Republican	1860	Henry T. Backus
13	Austin Blair (1818–1894)	January 2, 1861 – January 4, 1865 (1464 days; retired)	Republican	1862	Charles S. May
14	Henry H. Crapo (1804–1869)	January 4, 1865 – January 1, 1869 (1459 days; retired)	Republican	1864	Ebenezer O. Grosvenor
14	Henry H. Crapo (1804–1869)	January 4, 1865 – January 1, 1869 (1459 days; retired)	Republican	1866	Dwight May
15	Henry P. Baldwin (1814–1892)	January 1, 1869 – January 1, 1873 (1462 days; retired)	Republican	1868	Morgan Bates
15	Henry P. Baldwin (1814–1892)	January 1, 1869 – January 1, 1873 (1462 days; retired)	Republican	1870	Morgan Bates
16	John J. Bagley (1832–1881)	January 1, 1873 – January 3, 1877 (1464 days; retired)	Republican	1872	Henry H. Holt
16	John J. Bagley (1832–1881)	January 1, 1873 – January 3, 1877 (1464 days; retired)	Republican	1874	Henry H. Holt
17	Charles Croswell (1825–1886)	January 3, 1877 – January 1, 1881 (1460 days; retired)	Republican	1876	Alonzo Sessions
17	Charles Croswell (1825–1886)	January 3, 1877 – January 1, 1881 (1460 days; retired)	Republican	1878	Alonzo Sessions
18	David Jerome (1829–1896)	January 1, 1881 – January 1, 1883 (731 days; lost election)	Republican	1880	Moreau S. Crosby (Note: Represented the Republican Party)
19	Josiah Begole (1815–1896)	January 1, 1883 – January 1, 1885 (732 days; lost election)	Democratic (Note: Sobel & Raimo and Kallenbach say Begole was nominated by both the Democratic and Greenback parties; Glashan labels him as "National (or Greenback Labor)" and lists him separate from the Democratic Party.)	1882	Moreau S. Crosby
20	Russell A. Alger (1836–1907)	January 1, 1885 – January 1, 1887 (731 days; retired)	Republican	1884	Archibald Buttars
21	Cyrus G. Luce (1824–1905)	January 1, 1887 – January 1, 1891 (1462 days; retired)	Republican	1886	James H. MacDonald
21	Cyrus G. Luce (1824–1905)	January 1, 1887 – January 1, 1891 (1462 days; retired)	Republican	1888	William Ball
22	Edwin B. Winans (1826–1894)	January 1, 1891 – January 1, 1893 (732 days; retired)	Democratic	1890	John Strong
23	John T. Rich (1841–1926)	January 1, 1893 – January 1, 1897 (1462 days; retired)	Republican	1892	J. Wight Giddings
23	John T. Rich (1841–1926)	January 1, 1893 – January 1, 1897 (1462 days; retired)	Republican	1894	Alfred Milnes (resigned June 1, 1895)
23	John T. Rich (1841–1926)	January 1, 1893 – January 1, 1897 (1462 days; retired)	Republican	1894	Joseph R. McLaughlin
24	Hazen S. Pingree (1840–1901)	January 1, 1897 – January 1, 1901 (1461 days; retired)	Republican	1896	Thomas B. Dunstan
24	Hazen S. Pingree (1840–1901)	January 1, 1897 – January 1, 1901 (1461 days; retired)	Republican	1898	Orrin W. Robinson
25	Aaron T. Bliss (1837–1906)	January 1, 1901 – January 2, 1905 (1463 days; retired)	Republican	1900	Orrin W. Robinson
25	Aaron T. Bliss (1837–1906)	January 1, 1901 – January 2, 1905 (1463 days; retired)	Republican	1902	Alexander Maitland
26	Fred M. Warner (1865–1923)	January 2, 1905 – January 1, 1911 (2191 days; retired)	Republican	1904	Alexander Maitland
26	Fred M. Warner (1865–1923)	January 2, 1905 – January 1, 1911 (2191 days; retired)	Republican	1906	Patrick H. Kelley
26	Fred M. Warner (1865–1923)	January 2, 1905 – January 1, 1911 (2191 days; retired)	Republican	1908	Patrick H. Kelley
27	Chase Osborn (1860–1949)	January 1, 1911 (Note: The constitutional start date of the gubernatorial term was January 1; Osborn was not sworn in until January 2, presumably because January 1 was a Sunday.) – January 1, 1913 (732 days; retired)	Republican	1910	John Q. Ross
28	Woodbridge N. Ferris (1853–1928)	January 1, 1913 – January 1, 1917 (1462 days; retired)	Democratic	1912	John Q. Ross
28	Woodbridge N. Ferris (1853–1928)	January 1, 1913 – January 1, 1917 (1462 days; retired)	Democratic	1914	Luren Dickinson
29	Albert Sleeper (1862–1934)	January 1, 1917 – January 1, 1921 (1462 days; retired)	Republican	1916	Luren Dickinson
29	Albert Sleeper (1862–1934)	January 1, 1917 – January 1, 1921 (1462 days; retired)	Republican	1918	Luren Dickinson
30	Alex J. Groesbeck (1873–1953)	January 1, 1921 – January 1, 1927 (2192 days; lost nomination)	Republican	1920	Thomas Read
30	Alex J. Groesbeck (1873–1953)	January 1, 1921 – January 1, 1927 (2192 days; lost nomination)	Republican	1922	Thomas Read
30	Alex J. Groesbeck (1873–1953)	January 1, 1921 – January 1, 1927 (2192 days; lost nomination)	Republican	1924	George W. Welsh
31	Fred W. Green (1871–1936)	January 1, 1927 – January 1, 1931 (1462 days; retired)	Republican	1926	Luren Dickinson
31	Fred W. Green (1871–1936)	January 1, 1927 – January 1, 1931 (1462 days; retired)	Republican	1928	Luren Dickinson
32	Wilber M. Brucker (1894–1968)	January 1, 1931 – January 1, 1933 (732 days; lost election)	Republican	1930	Luren Dickinson
33	William Comstock (1877–1949)	January 1, 1933 (Note: The constitutional start date of the gubernatorial term was January 1; Comstock was not sworn in until January 2, presumably because January 1 was a Sunday.) – January 1, 1935 (731 days; lost nomination) (Note: Comstock lost the Democratic nomination to Arthur J. Lacy.)	Democratic	1932	Allen E. Stebbins
34	Frank Fitzgerald (1885–1939)	January 1, 1935 – January 1, 1937 (732 days; lost election)	Republican	1934	Thomas Read
35	Frank Murphy (1890–1949)	January 1, 1937 – January 1, 1939 (731 days; lost election)	Democratic	1936	Leo J. Nowicki
36	Frank Fitzgerald (1885–1939)	January 1, 1939 (Note: January 1 was on a Sunday; Fitzgerald took the oath of office early so he could properly take office on January 1, while his formal inauguration was the next day.) – March 16, 1939 (75 days; died in office)	Republican	1938	Luren Dickinson
37	Luren Dickinson (1859–1943)	March 16, 1939 – January 1, 1941 (658 days; lost election)	Republican	Succeeded from lieutenant governor	Matilda Dodge Wilson
38	Murray Van Wagoner (1898–1986)	January 1, 1941 – January 1, 1943 (731 days; lost election)	Democratic	1940	Frank Murphy
39	Harry Kelly (1895–1971)	January 1, 1943 – January 1, 1947 (1462 days; retired)	Republican	1942	Eugene C. Keyes
39	Harry Kelly (1895–1971)	January 1, 1943 – January 1, 1947 (1462 days; retired)	Republican	1944	Vernon J. Brown
40	Kim Sigler (1894–1953)	January 1, 1947 – January 1, 1949 (732 days; lost election)	Republican	1946	Eugene C. Keyes
41	G. Mennen Williams (1911–1988)	January 1, 1949 – January 1, 1961 (4384 days; retired)	Democratic	1948	John W. Connolly
41	G. Mennen Williams (1911–1988)	January 1, 1949 – January 1, 1961 (4384 days; retired)	Democratic	1950	William C. Vandenberg
41	G. Mennen Williams (1911–1988)	January 1, 1949 – January 1, 1961 (4384 days; retired)	Democratic	1952	Clarence A. Reid
41	G. Mennen Williams (1911–1988)	January 1, 1949 – January 1, 1961 (4384 days; retired)	Democratic	1954	Philip Hart
41	G. Mennen Williams (1911–1988)	January 1, 1949 – January 1, 1961 (4384 days; retired)	Democratic	1956	Philip Hart
41	G. Mennen Williams (1911–1988)	January 1, 1949 – January 1, 1961 (4384 days; retired)	Democratic	1958	John Swainson
42	John Swainson (1925–1994)	January 1, 1961 – January 1, 1963 (731 days; lost election)	Democratic	1960	T. John Lesinski (Note: Represented the Democratic Party)
43	George W. Romney (1907–1995)	January 1, 1963 – January 22, 1969 (2214 days; resigned) (Note: Romney resigned, having been confirmed as United States Secretary of Housing and Urban Development.)	Republican	1962	T. John Lesinski
43	George W. Romney (1907–1995)	January 1, 1963 – January 22, 1969 (2214 days; resigned)	Republican	1964	William Milliken
43	George W. Romney (1907–1995)	January 1, 1963 – January 22, 1969 (2214 days; resigned)	Republican	1966	William Milliken
44	William Milliken (1922–2019)	January 22, 1969 – January 1, 1983 (5093 days; retired)	Republican	Succeeded from lieutenant governor	Thomas F. Schweigert
44	William Milliken (1922–2019)	January 22, 1969 – January 1, 1983 (5093 days; retired)	Republican	1970	James H. Brickley
44	William Milliken (1922–2019)	January 22, 1969 – January 1, 1983 (5093 days; retired)	Republican	1974	James Damman
44	William Milliken (1922–2019)	January 22, 1969 – January 1, 1983 (5093 days; retired)	Republican	1978	James H. Brickley
45	James J. Blanchard (b. 1942)	January 1, 1983 – January 1, 1991 (2923 days; lost election)	Democratic	1982	Martha Griffiths
45	James J. Blanchard (b. 1942)	January 1, 1983 – January 1, 1991 (2923 days; lost election)	Democratic	1986	Martha Griffiths
46	John Engler (b. 1948)	January 1, 1991 – January 1, 2003 (4384 days; term-limited) (Note: Under a 1992 amendment to the constitution, no one can be elected more than twice to the office.)	Republican	1990	Connie Binsfeld
46	John Engler (b. 1948)	January 1, 1991 – January 1, 2003 (4384 days; term-limited)	Republican	1994	Connie Binsfeld
46	John Engler (b. 1948)	January 1, 1991 – January 1, 2003 (4384 days; term-limited)	Republican	1998	Dick Posthumus
47	Jennifer Granholm (b. 1959)	January 1, 2003 – January 1, 2011 (2923 days; term-limited)	Democratic	2002	John D. Cherry
47	Jennifer Granholm (b. 1959)	January 1, 2003 – January 1, 2011 (2923 days; term-limited)	Democratic	2006	John D. Cherry
48	Rick Snyder (b. 1958)	January 1, 2011 – January 1, 2019 (2923 days; term-limited)	Republican	2010	Brian Calley
48	Rick Snyder (b. 1958)	January 1, 2011 – January 1, 2019 (2923 days; term-limited)	Republican	2014	Brian Calley
49	Gretchen Whitmer (b. 1971)	January 1, 2019 – Incumbent (Note: Whitmer's second term began on January 1, 2023, and will expire on January 1, 2027; she is term-limited.) (in office 2883 days)	Democratic	2018	Garlin Gilchrist
49	Gretchen Whitmer (b. 1971)	January 1, 2019 – Incumbent (in office 2883 days)	Democratic	2022	Garlin Gilchrist
50	Jocelyn Benson (b. 1977)	Governor-elect takes office January 1, 2027	Democratic	2026	Winnie Brinks

== See also ==
- Gubernatorial lines of succession in the United States § Michigan
- List of first ladies and gentlemen of Michigan
- Lieutenant Governor of Michigan
- List of Michigan state legislatures

== Sources ==
- "Former Michigan Governors". National Governors Association.
- "Michigan Constitution". State Democracy Research Initiative. University of Wisconsin Law School.
- Dubin, Michael J. (2003). United States Gubernatorial Elections, 1776–1860: The Official Results by State and County. McFarland. ISBN 0-7864-1439-1 – via Internet Archive.
- Glashan, Roy R. (1979). American Governors and Gubernatorial Elections, 1775-1978. Meckler Books. ISBN 0-7201-1511-6 – via Internet Archive.
- Kallenbach, Joseph E.; Kallenbach, Jessamine S. (1977). American State Governors, 1776-1976. Oceana Publications. ISBN 978-0-379-00665-0 – via Internet Archive.
- McMullin, Thomas A.; Walker, David (1984). Biographical Directory of American Territorial Governors. Meckler Publishing. ISBN 0-930466-11-X – via Internet Archive.
- Mullaney, Marie Marmo (1994). Biographical Directory of the Governors of the United States, 1988–1994. Greenwood Publishing Group. ISBN 0-313-28312-5 – via Internet Archive.
- Sobel, Robert; Raimo, John (1978). Biographical Directory of the Governors of the United States, 1789-1978. Vol. 2. Meckler Books. ISBN 0-930466-01-2 – via Internet Archive.
- Thorpe, Francis Newton, ed. (1909). The Federal and State Constitutions, Colonial Charters, and Other Organic Laws of the States, Territories, and Colonies Now or Heretofore Forming the United States of America. Vol. 4. United States Government Publishing Office – via Internet Archive.
