= 1860 Michigan gubernatorial election =

- November 6, 1860
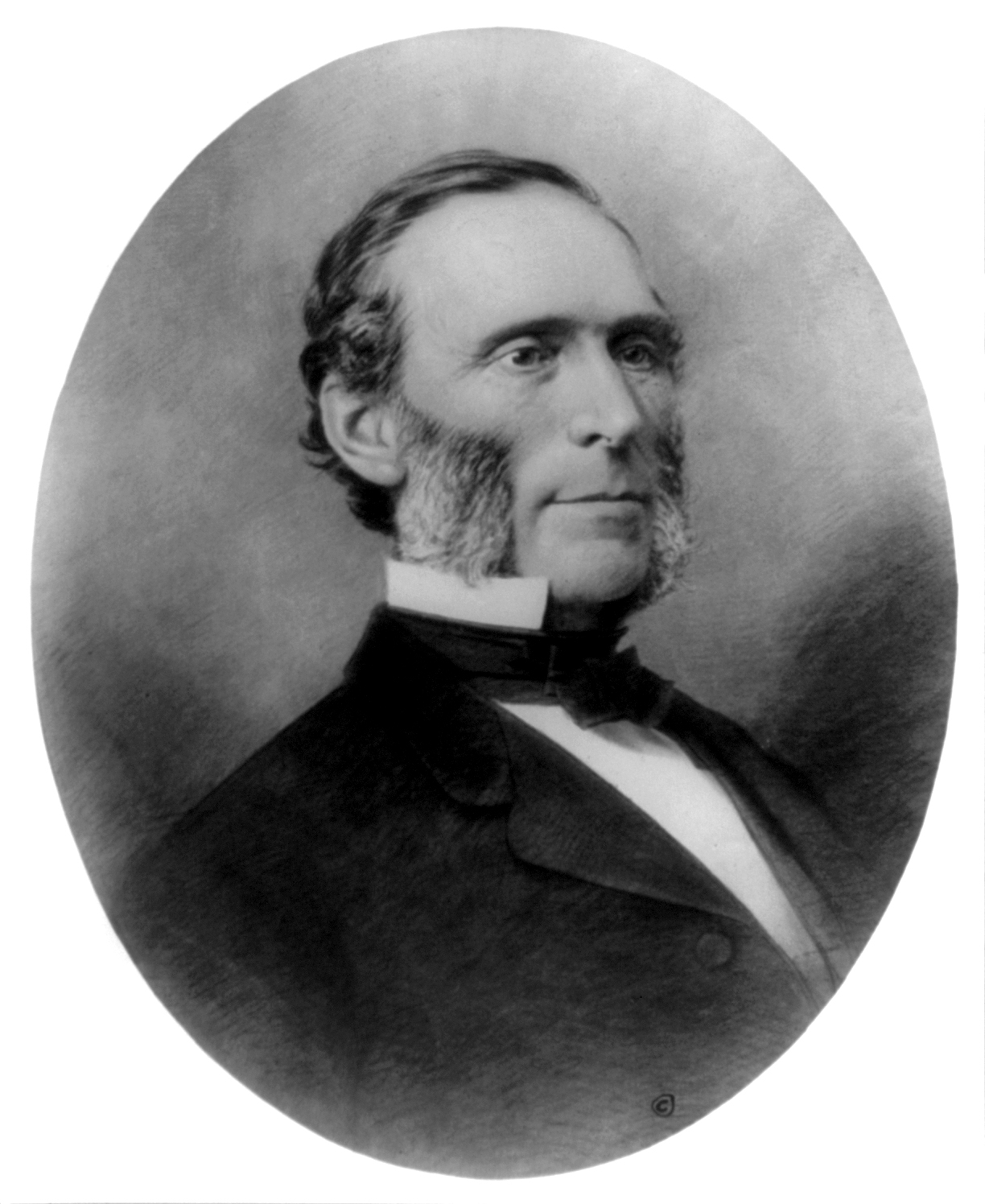

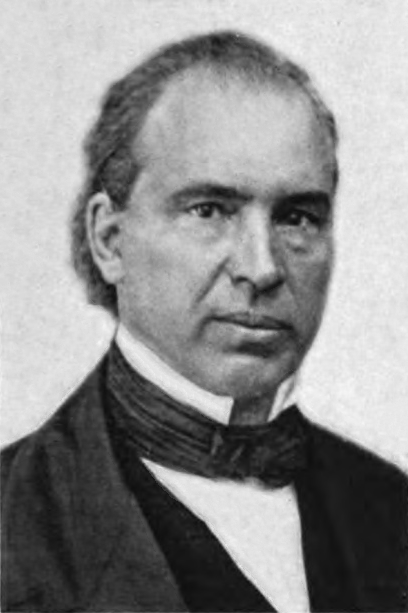
Nominee	Austin Blair	John S. Barry
Party	Republican	Democratic
Popular vote	87,806	67,221
Percentage	56.63%	43.35%
- County results Blair: 50–60% 60–70% 70–80% Barry: 50–60% 60–70% 70–80% No dava/vote
Governor before election
Moses Wisner
Republican
Elected Governor
Austin Blair
Republican

The 1860 Michigan gubernatorial election was held on November 6, 1860. Republican nominee Austin Blair defeated Democratic nominee John S. Barry with 56.63% of the vote.

== General election ==
=== Candidates ===
Major party candidates

- Austin Blair, Republican
- John S. Barry, Democratic

=== Results ===
1860 Michigan gubernatorial election
Party	Candidate	Votes	%	±%
Republican	Austin Blair	87,806	56.63%	+2.93%
Democratic	John S. Barry	67,221	43.35%	−2.82%
	Scattering	16	0.01%	
	Imperfect (Note: These are ballots that were intended for the main candidates but contained misspellings. The canvass does not list specific variations, it just groups these votes together.)	11	0.01%	
Majority		20,585	13.28%	
Total votes		155,054	100.00%	
Republican hold		Swing	+5.75%	

==== Results by county ====
No votes were recorded in Houghton County and Marquette County. This was one of only three elections before 1894 in which Wayne County did not vote for the Democratic candidate. (Note: The other two instances were in 1837 and 1872.)

County	Austin Blair Republican		John S. Barry Democratic		Margin		Total votes cast
County	#	%	#	%	#	%	Total votes cast
Allegan	1,875	54.25%	1,578	45.66%	297	8.59%	3,456 (Note: Includes 3 scattering votes)
Alpena	82	74.55%	28	25.45%	54	49.09%	110
Allegan	1,883	63.46%	1,083	36.50%	800	26.96%	2,967 (Note: Includes 1 scattering vote)
Bay	306	48.34%	327	51.66%	-21	-3.32%	633
Berrien	2,615	51.85%	2,428	48.15%	187	3.71%	5,043
Branch	3,054	65.49%	1,608	34.48%	1,446	31.01%	4,663 (Note: Includes 1 Imperfect vote)
Calhoun	4,053	61.28%	2,561	38.72%	1,492	22.56%	6,614
Cass	2,036	54.39%	1,702	45.47%	334	8.92%	3,743 (Note: Includes 3 scattering votes and 2 imperfect votes)
Cheboygan	20	21.28%	74	78.72%	-54	-57.45%	94
Chippewa	59	39.86%	89	60.14%	-30	-20.27%	148
Clinton	1,556	54.58%	1,295	45.42%	261	9.15%	2,851
Eaton	2,111	60.85%	1,356	39.09%	755	21.76%	3,469 (Note: Includes 2 Imperfect votes)
Emmet	26	13.40%	168	86.60%	-142	-73.20%	194
Genesee	2,812	58.68%	1,980	41.32%	832	17.36%	4,792
Grand Traverse	405	66.72%	202	33.28%	203	33.44%	607
Gratiot	496	61.01%	317	38.99%	179	22.02%	813
Hillsdale	3,704	67.27%	1,802	32.73%	1,902	34.54%	5,506
Huron	297	58.58%	210	41.42%	87	17.16%	507
Ingham	2,152	53.47%	1,873	46.53%	279	6.93%	4,025
Ionia	2,220	62.75%	1,318	37.25%	902	25.49%	3,538
Iosco	19	30.65%	43	69.35%	-24	-38.71%	62
Isabella	119	46.48%	137	53.52%	-18	-7.03%	256
Jackson	3,340	55.28%	2,701	44.70%	639	10.58%	6,042
Kalamazoo	3,193	60.05%	2,123	39.93%	1,070	20.12%	5,317
Kent	3,721	58.47%	2,643	41.53%	1,078	16.94%	6,364
Lapeer	1,743	58.12%	1,255	41.85%	488	16.27%	2,999
Lenawee	5,038	57.97%	3,652	42.03%	1,386	15.95%	8,690
Livingston	2,051	50.21%	2,034	49.79%	17	0.42%	4,085
Mackinac	41	30.83%	92	69.17%	-51	-38.35%	133
Macomb	2,523	53.23%	2,213	46.69%	310	6.54%	4,740 (Note: Includes 4 Imperfect votes)
Manistee	125	67.57%	60	32.43%	65	35.14%	185
Manitou	56	45.53%	67	54.47%	-11	-8.94%	123
Mason	89	64.49%	49	35.51%	40	28.99%	138
Mecosta	109	66.06%	56	33.94%	53	32.12%	165
Midland	161	73.52%	58	26.48%	103	47.03%	219
Monroe	2,272	50.94%	2,188	49.06%	84	1.88%	4,460
Montcalm	561	60.39%	368	39.61%	193	20.78%	929
Muskegon	500	67.39%	242	32.61%	258	34.77%	742
Newaygo	364	63.08%	213	36.92%	151	26.17%	577
Oakland	4,356	52.49%	3,942	47.51%	414	4.99%	8,298
Oceana	191	54.57%	159	45.43%	32	9.14%	350
Ontonagon	331	52.29%	302	47.71%	29	4.58%	633
Ottawa	1,397	53.02%	1,237	46.94%	160	6.07%	2,635
Saginaw	1,476	54.57%	1,229	45.43%	247	9.13%	2,705
Sanilac	889	68.07%	417	31.93%	472	36.14%	1,306
Shiawassee	1,574	55.29%	1,272	44.68%	302	10.61%	2,847
St. Clair	2,565	55.93%	2,018	44.00%	547	11.93%	4,586
St. Joseph	2,777	57.19%	2,077	42.77%	700	14.42%	4,856 (Note: Includes 2 scattering votes)
Tuscola	733	66.76%	365	33.24%	368	33.52%	1,098
Van Buren	2,151	61.90%	1,324	38.10%	827	23.80%	3,475
Washtenaw	4,278	53.36%	3,738	46.63%	540	6.74%	8,017
Wayne	7,301	51.24%	6,948	48.76%	353	2.48%	14,249
Total	87,806	56.63%	67,221	43.35%	20,585	13.28%	155,054

===== Counties that flipped from Democratic to Republican =====
- Genesee
- Grand Traverse
- Livingston
- Manistee
- Oceana
- Ottawa
- Saginaw
- Wayne

===== Counties that flipped from Republican to Democratic =====
- Chippewa
