= 1896 Michigan gubernatorial election =

- November 3, 1896
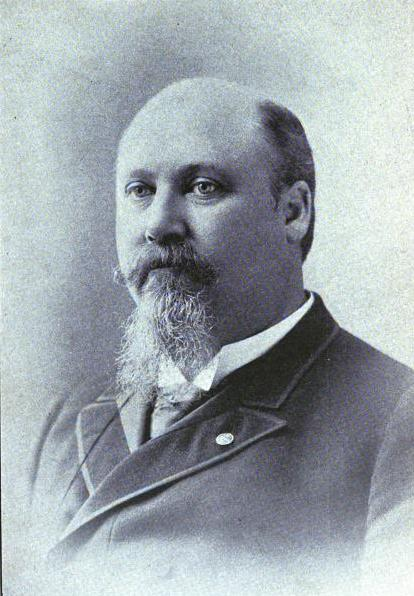

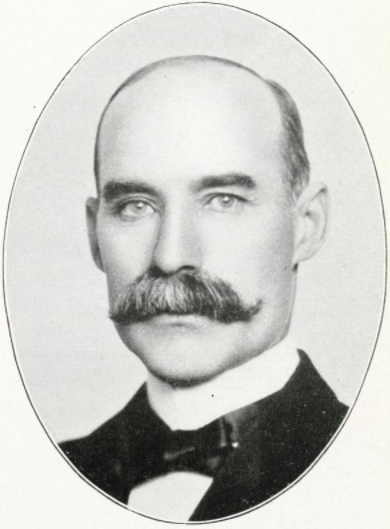
Nominee	Hazen S. Pingree	Charles R. Sligh
Party	Republican	Democratic
Alliance		Populist
Popular vote	304,431	225,200
Percentage	55.57%	40.35%
- County results Pingree: 40–50% 50–60% 60–70% 70–80% 80–90% Sligh: 40–50% 50–60%
Governor before election
John T. Rich
Republican
Elected Governor
Hazen S. Pingree
Republican

The 1896 Michigan gubernatorial election was held on November 3, 1896. Republican nominee Hazen S. Pingree defeated Fusion candidate of the Democratic, People's, and Union Silver parties, Charles R. Sligh with 55.57% of the vote.

== General election ==
=== Candidates ===
Major party candidates

- Hazen S. Pingree, Republican
- Charles R. Sligh, D.P.U.S (Note: Sligh ran under a fusion ticket between the Democrats, the Populists and the Union Silver parties.)

Other candidates

- Rufus S. Sprague, National Democratic
- Robert C. Safford, Prohibition
- John Giberson, National

=== Results ===
1896 Michigan gubernatorial election
Party	Candidate	Votes	%	±%
Republican	Hazen S. Pingree	304,431	55.57%	−1.31%
D. P. U. S.	Charles R. Sligh	225,200 (Note: Includes imperfect votes in Delta, Huron, and Ontonagon counties. Certified total: 221,022.)	41.11%	+9.74%
National Democratic	Rufus S. Sprague	10,403 (Note: Includes imperfect votes in Charlevoix, Crawford, Jackson, Menominee, Monroe, and Oakland counties. Certified total: 9,738.)	1.90%	
Prohibition	Robert C. Safford	5,563 (Note: Includes Imperfect votes in Sanilac County. Certified total: 5,499.)	1.02%	−3.49%
National	John Giberson	1,944	0.35%	
	Scattering	261	0.05%	
Majority		79,231	14.46%	
Total votes		547,802	100.00%	
Republican hold		Swing	-11.05%	

==== Results by county ====
Mackinac County voted Republican for the first time ever in this election. (Note: Mackinac County had previously voted Whig in 1843 and Liberal Republican in 1872.) Bay County voted Republican for the first time since 1872. After this election, Arenac County would not vote Democratic again until 1926.

County	Hazen S. Pingree Republican		Charles R. Sligh D.P.U.S.		Rufus S. Sprague National Democratic		Robert C. Safford Prohibition		John Giberson National		Margin		Total votes cast
County	#	%	#	%	#	%	#	%	#	%	#	%	Total votes cast
Alcona	760	72.17%	263	24.98%	23	2.18%	5	0.47%	2	0.19%	497	47.20%	1,053
Alger	843	60.73%	505	36.38%	25	1.80%	14	1.01%	1	0.07%	338	24.35%	1,388
Allegan	5,790	57.30%	3,970	39.29%	180	1.78%	110	1.09%	54	0.53%	1,820	18.01%	10,104
Alpena	1,871	53.47%	1,577	45.07%	37	1.06%	12	0.34%	2	0.06%	294	8.40%	3,499
Antrim	1,972	60.20%	1,155	35.26%	65	1.98%	47	1.43%	37	1.13%	817	24.94%	3,276
Arenac	640	39.12%	970	59.29%	18	1.10%	0	0.00%	8	0.49%	-330	-20.17%	1,636
Baraga	664	60.53%	407	37.10%	9	0.82%	14	1.28%	3	0.27%	257	23.43%	1,097
Barry	3,300	49.53%	3,129	46.96%	118	1.77%	67	1.01%	48	0.72%	171	2.57%	6,663 (Note: Includes 1 Scattering vote)
Bay	6,307	50.00%	6,030	47.80%	202	1.60%	66	0.52%	9	0.07%	277	2.20%	12,614
Benzie	1,362	59.97%	792	34.87%	45	1.98%	61	2.69%	10	0.44%	570	25.10%	2,271
Berrien	6,615	55.44%	4,808	40.30%	341	2.86%	129	1.08%	38	0.32%	1,807	15.15%	11,931
Branch	3,703	47.76%	3,882	50.07%	85	1.10%	43	0.55%	40	0.52%	-179	-2.31%	7,753
Calhoun	6,061	48.43%	5,967	47.68%	252	2.01%	204	1.63%	31	0.25%	94	0.75%	12,515
Cass	3,116	50.20%	2,930	47.20%	73	1.18%	70	1.13%	18	0.29%	186	3.00%	6,207
Charlevoix	1,675	61.72%	954	35.15%	33	1.22%	39	1.44%	13	0.48%	721	26.57%	2,714
Cheboygan	1,666	51.55%	1,521	47.06%	23	0.71%	12	0.37%	9	0.28%	145	4.49%	3,232
Chippewa	2,214	68.10%	918	28.24%	64	1.97%	52	1.60%	3	0.09%	1,296	39.86%	3,251
Clare	892	53.38%	688	41.17%	28	1.68%	14	0.84%	48	2.87%	204	12.21%	1,671
Clinton	3,593	50.54%	3,320	46.70%	99	1.39%	62	0.87%	35	0.49%	273	3.84%	7,109
Crawford	370	52.26%	331	46.75%	5	0.71%	2	0.28%	0	0.00%	39	5.51%	708
Delta	2,881	69.81%	1,158	28.06%	66	1.60%	15	0.36%	7	0.17%	1,723	41.75%	4,127
Dickinson	2,663	82.12%	461	14.22%	74	2.28%	42	1.30%	3	0.09%	2,202	67.90%	3,243
Eaton	4,397	48.26%	4,486	49.24%	138	1.51%	72	0.79%	18	0.20%	-89	-0.98%	9,111
Emmet	1,702	53.32%	1,327	41.57%	79	2.47%	78	2.44%	6	0.19%	375	11.75%	3,192
Genesee	5,853	53.69%	4,682	42.95%	145	1.33%	151	1.39%	71	0.65%	1,171	10.74%	10,902
Gladwin	781	68.93%	303	26.74%	30	2.65%	15	1.32%	4	0.35%	478	42.19%	1,133
Gogebic	1,993	68.18%	843	28.84%	51	1.74%	30	1.03%	6	0.21%	1,150	39.34%	2,923
Grand Traverse	2,570	57.92%	1,710	38.54%	66	1.49%	82	1.85%	9	0.20%	860	19.38%	4,437
Gratiot	3,507	46.51%	3,848	51.03%	84	1.11%	65	0.86%	37	0.49%	-341	-4.52%	7,541
Hillsdale	4,648	52.85%	3,900	44.34%	120	1.36%	87	0.99%	40	0.45%	748	8.50%	8,795
Houghton	6,386	74.15%	1,809	21.01%	183	2.12%	228	2.65%	6	0.07%	4,577	53.15%	8,612
Huron	3,600	56.62%	2,627	41.32%	91	1.43%	27	0.42%	13	0.20%	973	15.30%	6,358
Ingham	5,024	45.89%	5,518	50.40%	199	1.82%	128	1.17%	79	0.72%	-494	-4.51%	10,948
Ionia	4,657	48.98%	4,676	49.18%	86	0.90%	61	0.64%	28	0.29%	-19	-0.20%	9,508
Iosco	1,507	61.56%	873	35.66%	47	1.92%	18	0.74%	3	0.12%	634	25.90%	2,448
Iron	1,064	79.82%	234	17.55%	29	2.18%	0	0.00%	6	0.45%	830	62.27%	1,333
Isabella	2,467	47.38%	2,642	50.74%	27	0.52%	47	0.90%	24	0.46%	-175	-3.36%	5,207
Jackson	6,256	47.85%	6,312	48.28%	242	1.85%	162	1.24%	102	0.78%	-56	-0.43%	13,074
Kalamazoo	5,769	50.07%	5,435	47.17%	185	1.61%	107	0.93%	27	0.23%	334	2.90%	11,523
Kalkaska	968	68.31%	396	27.95%	27	1.91%	17	1.20%	9	0.64%	572	40.37%	1,417
Kent	16,973	54.10%	13,276	42.32%	689	2.20%	400	1.27%	35	0.11%	3,697	11.78%	31,373
Keweenaw	408	88.89%	43	9.37%	6	1.31%	2	0.44%	0	0.00%	365	79.52%	459
Lake	901	61.25%	534	36.30%	24	1.63%	9	0.61%	3	0.20%	367	24.95%	1,471
Lapeer	4,050	56.88%	2,819	39.59%	124	1.74%	103	1.45%	24	0.34%	1,231	17.29%	7,120
Leelanau	1,435	65.47%	656	29.93%	55	2.51%	39	1.78%	7	0.32%	779	35.54%	2,192
Lenawee	6,914	51.25%	6,155	45.62%	222	1.65%	167	1.24%	33	0.24%	759	5.63%	13,492
Livingston	2,990	49.15%	2,887	47.46%	89	1.46%	80	1.32%	37	0.61%	103	1.69%	6,083
Luce	395	62.20%	207	32.60%	17	2.68%	16	2.52%	0	0.00%	188	29.61%	635
Mackinac	863	51.71%	760	45.54%	35	2.10%	9	0.54%	2	0.12%	103	6.17%	1,669
Macomb	4,332	55.43%	3,195	40.88%	179	2.29%	84	1.07%	25	0.32%	1,137	14.55%	7,815
Manistee	2,855	53.45%	2,319	43.42%	112	2.10%	43	0.81%	12	0.22%	536	10.04%	5,341
Marquette	5,323	72.31%	1,792	24.34%	115	1.56%	109	1.48%	22	0.30%	3,531	47.97%	7,361
Mason	2,236	57.38%	1,536	39.41%	73	1.87%	36	0.92%	16	0.41%	700	17.96%	3,897
Mecosta	2,896	57.83%	1,943	38.80%	107	2.14%	53	1.06%	9	0.18%	953	19.03%	5,008
Menominee	3,209	68.03%	1,432	30.36%	48	1.02%	24	0.51%	4	0.08%	1,777	37.67%	4,717
Midland	1,583	50.56%	1,457	46.53%	50	1.60%	32	1.02%	9	0.29%	126	4.02%	3,131
Missaukee	906	55.38%	680	41.56%	18	1.10%	28	1.71%	4	0.24%	226	13.81%	1,636
Monroe	4,234	50.09%	4,036	47.75%	87	1.03%	58	0.69%	37	0.44%	198	2.34%	8,452
Montcalm	4,494	53.78%	3,563	42.63%	217	2.60%	65	0.78%	18	0.22%	931	11.14%	8,357
Montmorency	524	62.53%	307	36.63%	1	0.12%	5	0.60%	1	0.12%	217	25.89%	838
Muskegon	4,800	59.99%	2,985	37.31%	124	1.55%	77	0.96%	15	0.19%	1,815	22.68%	8,001
Newaygo	2,596	55.79%	1,954	41.99%	34	0.73%	49	1.05%	20	0.43%	642	13.80%	4,653
Oakland	6,147	52.30%	5,006	42.59%	250	2.13%	136	1.16%	214	1.82%	1,141	9.71%	11,753
Oceana	2,573	58.46%	1,627	36.97%	64	1.45%	118	2.68%	19	0.43%	946	21.50%	4,401
Ogemaw	913	64.61%	452	31.99%	22	1.56%	20	1.42%	6	0.42%	461	32.63%	1,413
Ontonagon	792	65.19%	393	32.35%	21	1.73%	8	0.66%	1	0.08%	399	32.84%	1,215
Osceola	2,339	64.36%	1,124	30.93%	81	2.23%	54	1.49%	36	0.99%	1,215	33.43%	3,634
Oscoda	310	80.73%	62	16.15%	11	2.86%	1	0.26%	0	0.00%	248	64.58%	384
Otsego	941	64.63%	489	33.59%	15	1.03%	8	0.55%	3	0.21%	452	31.04%	1,456
Ottawa	5,218	58.48%	3,466	38.84%	148	1.66%	68	0.76%	23	0.26%	1,752	19.63%	8,923
Presque Isle	784	67.24%	360	30.87%	10	0.86%	10	0.86%	2	0.17%	424	36.36%	1,166
Roscommon	295	68.29%	129	29.86%	3	0.69%	4	0.93%	1	0.23%	166	38.43%	432
Saginaw	8,733	49.93%	8,271	47.28%	365	2.09%	86	0.49%	37	0.21%	462	2.64%	17,492
Sanilac	3,802	53.97%	3,004	42.64%	94	1.33%	92	1.31%	53	0.75%	798	11.33%	7,045
Schoolcraft	1,023	65.33%	511	32.63%	13	0.83%	18	1.15%	1	0.06%	512	32.69%	1,566
Shiawassee	4,728	50.97%	4,231	45.61%	180	1.94%	100	1.08%	37	0.40%	497	5.36%	9,276
St. Clair	7,374	58.31%	4,848	38.34%	274	2.17%	106	0.84%	44	0.35%	2,526	19.97%	12,646
St. Joseph	3,184	43.72%	3,953	54.28%	64	0.88%	71	0.97%	11	0.15%	-769	-10.56%	7,283
Tuscola	4,529	56.01%	3,326	41.13%	96	1.19%	93	1.15%	42	0.52%	1,203	14.88%	8,086
Van Buren	4,618	52.93%	3,893	44.62%	109	1.25%	75	0.86%	29	0.33%	725	8.31%	8,724
Washtenaw	5,975	52.53%	4,876	42.87%	351	3.09%	111	0.98%	61	0.54%	1,099	9.66%	11,374
Wayne	41,068	62.41%	21,961	33.37%	2,071	3.15%	383	0.58%	63	0.10%	19,107	29.04%	65,802 (Note: Includes 256 Scattering votes)
Wexford	2,061	58.78%	1,325	37.79%	41	1.17%	58	1.65%	21	0.60%	736	20.99%	3,506
Total	304,431	55.57%	225,200	41.11%	10,403	1.90%	5,563	1.02%	1,944	0.35%	79,231	14.46%	547,802

===== Counties that flipped from Democratic to Republican =====
- Bay
- Mackinac
- Presque Isle

===== Counties that flipped from Republican to Democratic =====
- Branch
- Eaton
- Gratiot
- Ingham
- Ionia
- Isabella
- Jackson
- St. Joseph

===== Counties that flipped from Populist to Democratic =====
- Arenac
