= 1924 Michigan gubernatorial election =

- November 4, 1924
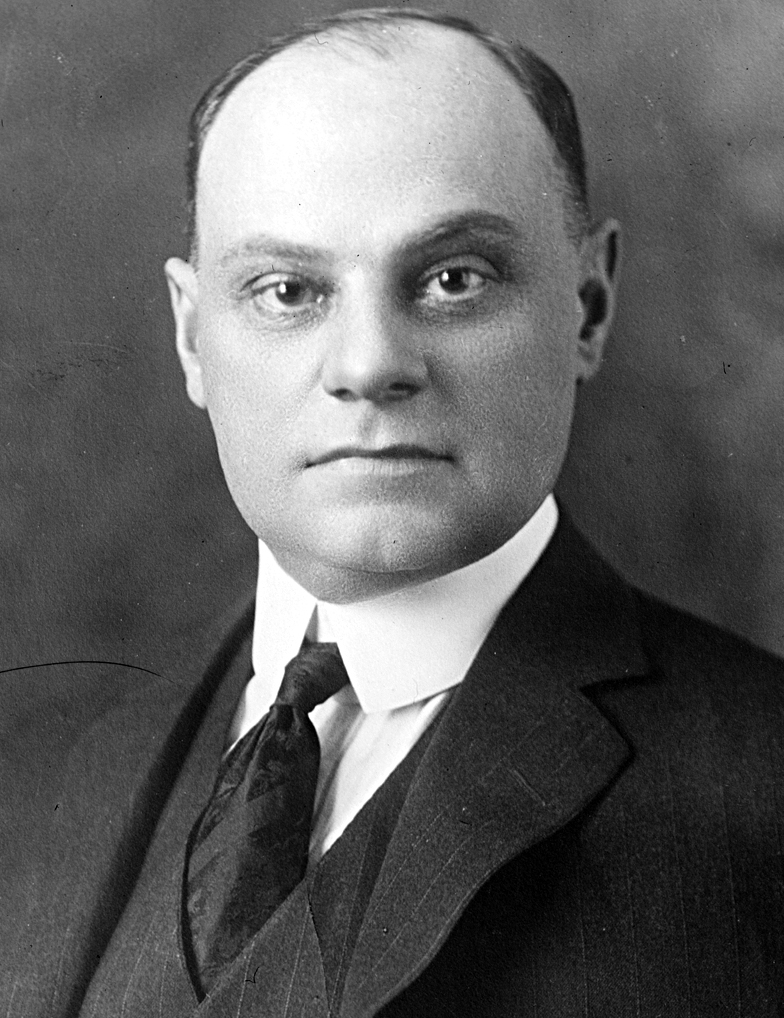

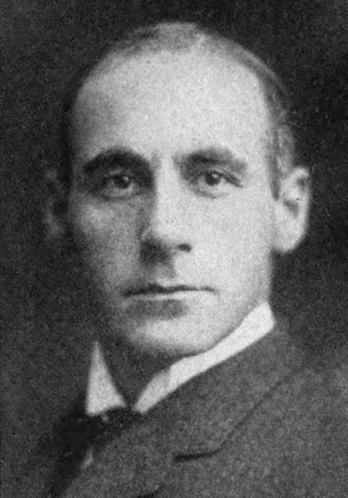
Nominee	Alex J. Groesbeck	Edward Frensdorf
Party	Republican	Democratic
Popular vote	799,225	343,577
Percentage	68.84%	29.60%
- County results Groesbeck: 50–60% 60–70% 70–80% 80–90% >90% Frensdorf: 50–60% 60–70%
Governor before election
Alex J. Groesbeck
Republican
Elected Governor
Alex J. Groesbeck
Republican

The 1924 Michigan gubernatorial election was held on November 4, 1924. Incumbent Republican Alex J. Groesbeck defeated Democratic nominee Edward Frensdorf with 68.84% of the vote.

== Primary election ==
Michigan held primary elections on September 9, 1924.

=== Republican party ===
Incumbent governor Alex J. Groesbeck won nomination for a third consecutive term.

==== Candidates ====
- Herbert F. Baker, former member of Michigan Senate
- Alex J. Groesbeck, incumbent governor
- James Hamilton
- Frederick Perry
- William W. Potter, former member of Michigan Senate
- Thomas Read, Lieutenant Governor of Michigan
- Charles R. Sligh, member of Michigan Senate

==== Results ====
Republican primary results
Party	Candidate	Votes	%
Republican	Alex J. Groesbeck (inc.)	348,955	44.05%
Republican	James Hamilton	129,244	16.32%
Republican	Herbert F. Baker	105,320	13.30%
Republican	Charles R. Sligh	93,815	11.84%
Republican	Frederick Perry	79,225	10.00%
Republican	William W. Potter	19,317	2.44%
Republican	Thomas Read	16,255	2.05%
Total votes		792,131	100.00%

=== Democratic party ===
Edward Frensdorf was nominated without opposition.

==== Candidates ====
- Edward Frensdorf, candidate for Democratic nomination in 1918

==== Results ====
Democratic primary results
Party	Candidate	Votes	%
Democratic	Edward Frensdorf	27,851	100.00%
Total votes		27,851	100.00%

=== Minor parties ===
Prohibition primary results
Party	Candidate	Votes	%
Prohibition	John Y. Johnston	183	100.00%
Total votes		183	100.00%

Socialist Labor primary results
Party	Candidate	Votes	%
Socialist Labor	Paul Dinger	271	100.00%
Total votes		271	100.00%

Socialist primary results
Party	Candidate	Votes	%
Socialist	William L. Krieghoff	421	100.00%
Total votes		421	100.00%

== General election ==
=== Candidates ===
Major party candidates

- Alex J. Groesbeck, Republican
- Edward Frensdorf, Democratic

Other candidates

- John Y. Johnston, Prohibition
- Paul Dinger, Socialist Labor
- William L. Krieghoff, Socialist

=== Results ===
1924 Michigan gubernatorial election
Party	Candidate	Votes	%	±%
Republican	Alex J. Groesbeck (inc.)	799,225	68.84%	+7.69%
Democratic	Edward Frensdorf	343,577	29.60%	−7.80%
Prohibition	John Y. Johnston	11,118	0.96%	+0.49%
Socialist Labor	Paul Dinger	4,079	0.35%	+0.13%
Socialist	William L. Krieghoff	2,725	0.23%	−0.53%
	Scattering	194	0.02%	
Majority		455,648	39.25%	
Total votes		1,160,918	100.00%	
Republican hold		Swing	+15.49%	

==== Results by county ====
Frensdorf was the first Democrat since John S. Barry in 1854 to carry Lapeer County. After this election, the following counties would not vote Democratic again until 1986: Barry, Hillsdale, Lapeer, and Newaygo.

County	Alex J. Groesbeck Republican		Edward Frensdorf Democratic		John Y. Johnston Prohibition		Paul Dinger Socialist Labor		William L. Krieghoff Socialist		Margin		Total votes cast
County	#	%	#	%	#	%	#	%	#	%	#	%	Total votes cast
Alcona	883	64.17%	456	33.14%	24	1.74%	10	0.73%	3	0.22%	427	31.03%	1,376
Alger	1,857	82.90%	294	13.13%	29	1.29%	40	1.79%	20	0.89%	1,563	69.78%	2,240
Allegan	6,380	54.17%	5,206	44.20%	142	1.21%	31	0.26%	17	0.14%	1,174	9.97%	11,778 (Note: Includes 2 Scattering votes)
Alpena	4,585	75.62%	1,412	23.29%	45	0.74%	15	0.25%	6	0.10%	3,173	52.33%	6,063
Antrim	1,756	61.64%	1,012	35.52%	51	1.79%	18	0.63%	12	0.42%	744	26.11%	2,849
Arenac	1,708	63.19%	952	35.22%	30	1.11%	4	0.15%	9	0.33%	756	27.97%	2,703
Baraga	1,920	86.02%	223	9.99%	41	1.84%	35	1.57%	13	0.58%	1,697	76.03%	2,232
Barry	2,489	30.91%	5,463	67.84%	85	1.06%	13	0.16%	3	0.04%	2,974	36.93%	8,053
Bay	15,037	67.47%	6,990	31.16%	183	0.82%	48	0.22%	29	0.13%	8,047	36.11%	22,287
Benzie	1,763	71.93%	610	24.89%	53	2.16%	18	0.73%	7	0.29%	1,153	47.04%	2,451
Berrien	13,960	60.19%	8,921	38.46%	190	0.82%	82	0.35%	42	0.18%	5,039	21.72%	23,195
Branch	3,649	39.16%	5,533	59.37%	118	1.27%	14	0.15%	5	0.05%	-1,884	-20.22%	9,319
Calhoun	14,501	58.38%	9,931	39.98%	269	1.08%	98	0.39%	40	0.16%	4,570	18.40%	24,839
Cass	3,127	41.72%	4,285	57.16%	57	0.76%	15	0.20%	12	0.16%	-1,158	-15.45%	7,496
Charlevoix	2,966	72.98%	959	23.60%	94	2.31%	23	0.57%	19	0.47%	2,007	49.38%	4,064 (Note: Includes 3 Scattering votes)
Cheboygan	2,629	62.55%	1,479	35.19%	76	1.81%	14	0.33%	4	0.10%	1,150	27.36%	4,203 (Note: Includes 1 Scattering vote)
Chippewa	5,419	80.38%	1,210	17.95%	75	1.11%	26	0.39%	10	0.15%	4,209	62.43%	6,742
Clare	1,336	52.89%	1,140	45.13%	34	1.35%	14	0.55%	2	0.08%	196	7.76%	2,526
Clinton	3,425	38.82%	5,299	60.07%	87	0.99%	7	0.08%	4	0.05%	-1,874	-21.24%	8,822
Crawford	752	66.26%	368	32.42%	10	0.88%	3	0.26%	2	0.18%	384	33.83%	1,135
Delta	6,289	84.33%	1,000	13.41%	63	0.84%	79	1.06%	27	0.36%	5,289	70.92%	7,458
Dickinson	5,354	87.18%	551	8.97%	76	1.24%	99	1.61%	61	0.99%	4,803	78.21%	6,141
Eaton	4,389	38.41%	6,869	60.11%	141	1.23%	19	0.17%	10	0.09%	-2,480	-21.70%	11,428
Emmet	2,706	63.52%	1,439	33.78%	71	1.67%	25	0.59%	19	0.45%	1,267	29.74%	4,260
Genesee	27,556	67.24%	12,993	31.71%	300	0.73%	86	0.21%	45	0.11%	14,563	35.54%	40,980
Gladwin	1,415	58.81%	938	38.99%	46	1.91%	2	0.08%	5	0.21%	477	19.83%	2,406
Gogebic	6,290	87.89%	547	7.64%	158	2.21%	118	1.65%	43	0.60%	5,743	80.24%	7,157
Grand Traverse	3,867	73.81%	1,199	22.89%	120	2.29%	39	0.74%	14	0.27%	2,668	50.93%	5.239
Gratiot	3,592	40.01%	5,234	58.30%	130	1.45%	16	0.18%	5	0.06%	-1,642	-18.29%	8,978
Hillsdale	3,246	33.83%	6,216	64.78%	107	1.12%	20	0.21%	6	0.06%	-2,970	-30.95%	9,595
Houghton	14,846	92.13%	1,072	6.65%	94	0.58%	74	0.46%	29	0.18%	13,774	85.47%	16,115
Huron	7,051	64.32%	3,802	34.68%	88	0.80%	11	0.10%	10	0.09%	3,249	29.64%	10,962
Ingham	18,362	51.71%	16,627	46.82%	417	1.17%	48	0.14%	53	0.15%	1,735	4.89%	35,509
Ionia	4,497	34.78%	8,250	63.81%	163	1.26%	14	0.11%	5	0.04%	-3,753	-29.03%	12,929
Iosco	1,466	60.58%	881	36.40%	51	2.11%	14	0.58%	5	0.21%	585	24.17%	2,420
Iron	3,255	89.62%	251	6.91%	66	1.82%	42	1.16%	18	0.50%	3,004	82.71%	3,632
Isabella	3,634	51.80%	3,238	46.16%	121	1.72%	11	0.16%	10	0.14%	396	5.65%	7,015
Jackson	14,290	50.27%	13,886	48.85%	192	0.68%	35	0.12%	25	0.09%	404	1.42%	28,428
Kalamazoo	12,655	52.43%	11,173	46.29%	201	0.83%	62	0.26%	47	0.19%	1,482	6.14%	24,138
Kalkaska	804	61.05%	444	33.71%	40	3.04%	22	1.67%	7	0.53%	360	27.33%	1,317
Kent	43,073	73.68%	14,564	24.91%	541	0.93%	198	0.34%	84	0.14%	28,509	48.77%	58,460
Keweenaw	1,452	94.96%	51	3.34%	7	0.46%	15	0.98%	4	0.26%	1,401	91.63%	1,529
Lake	832	54.03%	663	43.05%	36	2.34%	7	0.45%	2	0.13%	169	10.97%	1,540
Lapeer	3,620	46.52%	4,025	51.73%	119	1.53%	13	0.17%	4	0.05%	-405	-5.20%	7,781
Leelanau	1,803	78.32%	429	18.64%	42	1.82%	18	0.78%	10	0.43%	1,374	59.69%	2,302
Lenawee	6,194	33.97%	11,879	65.15%	132	0.72%	21	0.12%	6	0.03%	-5,685	-31.18%	18,232
Livingston	3,389	45.80%	3,885	52.50%	112	1.51%	12	0.16%	2	0.03%	-496	-6.70%	7,400
Luce	857	81.00%	189	17.86%	11	1.04%	0	0.00%	1	0.09%	668	63.14%	1,058
Mackinac	1,752	58.79%	1,201	40.30%	16	0.54%	9	0.30%	2	0.07%	551	18.49%	2,980
Macomb	10,737	67.98%	4,942	31.29%	71	0.45%	23	0.15%	17	0.11%	5,795	36.69%	15,795 (Note: Includes 5 Scattering votes)
Manistee	3,725	59.06%	2,471	39.18%	69	1.09%	20	0.32%	22	0.35%	1,254	19.88%	6,307
Marquette	11,795	89.13%	1,142	8.63%	120	0.91%	98	0.74%	78	0.59%	10,653	80.50%	13,233
Mason	3,245	61.23%	1,856	35.02%	118	2.23%	55	1.04%	26	0.49%	1,389	26.21%	5,300
Mecosta	2,861	55.87%	2,128	41.55%	93	1.82%	27	0.53%	12	0.23%	733	14.31%	5,121
Menominee	4,662	69.12%	1,947	28.87%	66	0.98%	44	0.65%	26	0.39%	2,715	40.25%	6,745
Midland	3,039	57.68%	2,114	40.12%	98	1.86%	13	0.25%	5	0.09%	925	17.56%	5,269
Missaukee	1,628	79.92%	380	18.65%	22	1.08%	4	0.20%	2	0.10%	1,248	61.27%	2,037
Monroe	8,067	52.52%	7,030	45.77%	214	1.39%	26	0.17%	23	0.15%	1,037	6.75%	15,360
Montcalm	4,252	48.11%	4,406	49.85%	157	1.78%	17	0.19%	6	0.07%	-154	-1.74%	8,838
Montmorency	700	59.83%	311	26.58%	23	1.97%	1	0.09%	5	0.43%	389	33.25%	1,170 (Note: Includes 130 Scattering votes)
Muskegon	13,152	71.71%	4,972	27.11%	123	0.67%	54	0.29%	40	0.22%	8,180	44.60%	18,341
Newaygo	2,392	44.19%	2,869	53.00%	123	2.27%	11	0.20%	18	0.33%	-477	-8.81%	5,413
Oakland	25,704	71.92%	9,574	26.79%	320	0.90%	83	0.23%	48	0.13%	16,130	45.13%	35,738 (Note: Includes 9 Scattering votes)
Oceana	2,036	45.51%	2,302	51.45%	97	2.17%	23	0.51%	11	0.25%	-266	-5.95%	4,474
Ogemaw	1,407	64.01%	733	33.35%	46	2.09%	7	0.32%	3	0.14%	674	30.66%	2,198
Ontonagon	2,443	80.73%	488	16.13%	18	0.59%	52	1.72%	25	0.83%	1,955	64.61%	3,026
Osceola	2,463	63.40%	1,338	34.44%	70	1.80%	11	0.28%	3	0.08%	1,125	28.96%	3,885
Oscoda	390	82.11%	83	17.47%	1	0.21%	1	0.21%	0	0.00%	307	64.63%	475
Otsego	984	63.61%	532	34.39%	22	1.42%	7	0.45%	1	0.06%	452	29.22%	1,547
Ottawa	10,402	70.71%	4,183	28.43%	72	0.49%	38	0.26%	16	0.11%	6,219	42.27%	14,711
Presque Isle	2,629	83.43%	473	15.01%	32	1.02%	12	0.38%	3	0.10%	2,156	68.42%	3,151
Roscommon	520	75.36%	147	21.30%	12	1.74%	8	1.16%	2	0.29%	373	54.06%	690
Saginaw	20,841	61.37%	12,558	36.98%	407	1.20%	89	0.26%	62	0.18%	8,283	24.39%	33,957
Sanilac	4,948	52.20%	4,333	45.71%	176	1.86%	7	0.07%	10	0.11%	615	6.49%	9,479
Schoolcraft	1,614	73.26%	519	23.56%	39	1.77%	22	1.00%	9	0.41%	1,095	49.70%	2,203
Shiawassee	5,323	43.32%	6,558	53.37%	328	2.67%	58	0.47%	20	0.16%	-1,235	-10.05%	12,288
St. Clair	15,211	65.37%	7,727	33.21%	260	1.12%	35	0.15%	20	0.09%	7,484	32.16%	23,268 (Note: Includes 15 Scattering votes)
St. Joseph	4,568	45.14%	5,409	53.45%	94	0.93%	42	0.42%	7	0.07%	-841	-8.31%	10,120
Tuscola	5,594	60.06%	3,511	37.70%	190	2.04%	9	0.10%	9	0.10%	2,083	22.36%	9,314
Van Buren	5,849	58.18%	4,008	39.86%	121	1.20%	45	0.45%	31	0.31%	1,841	18.31%	10,054
Washtenaw	12,141	62.58%	6,963	35.89%	200	1.03%	57	0.29%	39	0.20%	5,178	26.69%	19,400
Wayne	302,292	87.56%	38,382	11.12%	1,844	0.53%	1,402	0.41%	1,301	0.38%	263,910	76.45%	345,221
Wexford	2,933	58.33%	1,949	38.76%	118	2.35%	21	0.42%	7	0.14%	984	19.57%	5,028
Total	799,225	68.84%	343,577	29.60%	11,118	0.96%	4,079	0.35%	2,725	0.23%	455,648	39.25%	1,160,918

===== Counties that flipped from Democratic to Republican =====
- Ingham
- Isabella
- Jackson
- Monroe

===== Counties that flipped from Republican to Democratic =====
- Barry
- Cass
- Lapeer
- Montcalm
- Newaygo
- Oceana
- St. Joseph
