= Philo C. Fuller =

American politician

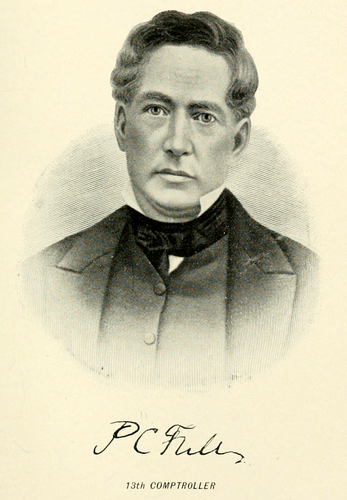

New York State Comptroller
- In office 1850–1851
- Governor: Hamilton Fish; Washington Hunt
- Preceded by: Washington Hunt
- Succeeded by: John Wright

5th Speaker of the Michigan House of Representatives
- In office 1841–1841
- Preceded by: Henry Acker
- Succeeded by: John Biddle

Member of the Michigan House of Representatives from the Lenawee County district
- In office 1841–1841

Member of the U.S. House of Representatives from New York's 30th district
- In office March 4, 1833 – September 2, 1836
- Preceded by: Bates Cooke
- Succeeded by: John Young

Member of the New York Senate from the 8th district
- In office 1831–1832

Member of the New York State Assembly from the Livingston County district
- In office 1829–1830

Personal details
- Born: August 14, 1787 Marlborough, Massachusetts
- Died: August 16, 1855 (aged 68) Geneva, New York
- Resting place: Temple Hill Cemetery, Geneseo, New York
- Spouse: Sophia Nowlen
- Children: 3
- Parent(s): Samuel Fuller; Delia Case

Military service
- Branch/service: United States Army
- Battles/wars: War of 1812

Philo Case Fuller (August 14, 1787, near Marlboro, Middlesex County, Massachusetts – August 16, 1855, near Geneva, Ontario County, New York) was an American lawyer and politician.

== Early life ==
Fuller was born on August 14, 1787, in Marlborough, Massachusetts. He was the son of Samuel Fuller and Delia (née Case) Fuller. He served in the War of 1812.

Fuller was educated at the local common schools. He studied law and was admitted to the bar in 1813, and practiced in Geneseo, New York.

== Career ==
Fuller served as private secretary to General William Wadsworth of Geneseo, New York, and practiced law in Albany, New York.

From 1829 to 1830, he was a member of the New York State Assembly (Livingston Co.) in 52nd and 53rd New York State Legislatures. From 1831 to 1832, he was a member of the New York State Senate (8th D.), sitting in the 54th and 55th New York State Legislatures.

Fuller was elected as an Anti-Mason to the 23rd United States Congress, and re-elected as an Anti-Jacksonian to the 24th United States Congress, holding office from March 4, 1833, to September 2, 1836, when he resigned, and moved to Adrian, Michigan, where he engaged in banking and was president of the Erie and Kalamazoo Railroad.

He was a member of the Michigan House of Representatives in 1841 and was Speaker until April 3 when he resigned having been appointed Assistant United States Postmaster General by President William Henry Harrison. Later that year, he was an unsuccessful Whig candidate for Governor of Michigan. Afterwards he returned to Geneseo, New York.

On December 18, 1850, he was appointed New York State Comptroller, and served for the remainder of Washington Hunt's unexpired term until the end of 1851.

== Personal life ==
In April 1817, he married Sophia Nowlen (c. 1791 – 1850), a native of Connecticut. Their children were:

- Samuel Lucius Fuller (1818–1897), who served as private secretary to Charles H. Carroll.
- Edward Philo Fuller (1820–1866), who married Cornelia Granger Carroll (1826–1909), daughter of Congressman Charles H. Carroll
- George A. Fuller (b. 1822).

Fuller died near Geneva, New York, on August 16, 1855. He was buried at the Temple Hill Cemetery in Geneseo.

Party political offices
Preceded by William Woodbridge	Whig nominee for Governor of Michigan; 1841	Succeeded by Zina Pitcher
New York State Senate
Preceded by Moses Hayden	New York State Senate; Eighth District (Class 2); 1831–1832	Succeeded by John Griffin
U.S. House of Representatives
Preceded by Bates Cooke	Member of the U.S. House of Representatives from New York's 30th congressional district 1833–1836	Succeeded by John Young
Political offices
Preceded by Washington Hunt	New York State Comptroller; 1850–1851	Succeeded by John C. Wright
