= 1841 Michigan gubernatorial election =

- November 1–2, 1841
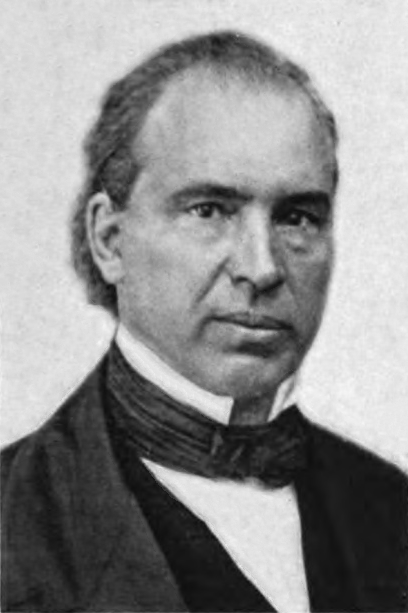

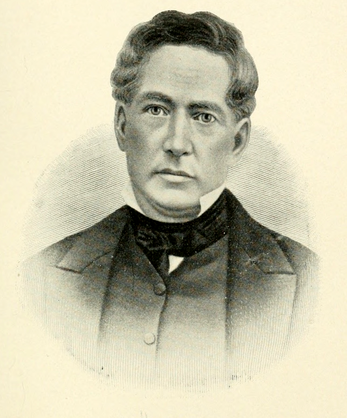
Nominee	John S. Barry	Philo C. Fuller
Party	Democratic	Whig
Popular vote	20,993	15,449
Percentage	55.65%	40.95%
- County results Barry: 40–50% 50–60% 60–70% 80–90% Fuller: 40–50% 50–60% 60–70% No Data/Votes
Governor before election
James Wright Gordon
Whig
Elected Governor
John S. Barry
Democratic

The 1841 Michigan gubernatorial election was held from November 1, 1841, to November 2, 1841. Democratic nominee John S. Barry defeated Whig nominee Philo C. Fuller with 55.65% of the vote.

== General election ==
=== Candidates ===
Major party candidates

- John S. Barry, Democratic
- Philo C. Fuller, Whig

Other candidates

- Jabez S. Fitch, Liberty

=== Results ===
1841 Michigan gubernatorial election
Party	Candidate	Votes	%	±%
Democratic	John S. Barry	20,993	55.65%	+7.37%
Whig	Philo C. Fuller	15,449	40.95%	−10.61%
Liberty	Jabez S. Fitch	1,223	3.24%	
	Scattering	59	0.16%	
Majority		5,544	14.70%	
Total votes		37,724	100.00%	
Democratic gain from Whig		Swing	+17.98%	

==== Results By County ====
County	John S. Barry Democratic		Philo C. Fuller Whig		Jabez S. Fitch Liberty		Margin		Total votes cast
County	#	%	#	%	#	%	#	%	Total votes cast
Allegan	189	50.00%	188	49.74%	0	0.00%	1	0.26%	378 (Note: Includes 1 Scattering vote)
Barry	132	51.56%	121	47.27%	3	1.17%	11	4.30%	256
Berrien	537	59.80%	356	39.64%	2	0.22%	181	20.16%	898 (Note: Includes 3 Scattering votes)
Branch	685	66.83%	330	32.20%	9	0.88%	355	34.63%	1,025
Calhoun	1,020	52.66%	829	42.80%	88	4.54%	191	9.86%	1,937
Cass	554	49.82%	551	49.55%	7	0.63%	3	0.27%	1,112
Chippewa	28	38.89%	44	61.11%	0	0.00%	-16	-22.22%	72
Clinton	195	55.24%	157	44.48%	0	0.00%	38	10.76%	353
Eaton	221	43.59%	267	52.66%	18	3.55%	-46	-9.07%	507
Genesee	350	43.48%	399	49.57%	56	6.96%	-49	-6.09%	805
Hillsdale	753	54.29%	557	40.16%	51	3.68%	196	14.13%	1,387 (Note: Includes 26 Scattering votes)
Ingham	260	49.24%	240	45.45%	28	5.30%	20	3.79%	528
Ionia	260	55.79%	194	41.63%	12	2.58%	66	14.16%	466
Jackson	1,127	52.76%	862	40.36%	147	6.88%	265	12.41%	2,136
Kalamazoo	704	47.54%	671	45.31%	102	6.89%	33	2.23%	1,481 (Note: Includes 4 Scattering votes)
Kent	338	60.90%	209	37.66%	7	1.26%	129	23.24%	555
Lapeer	400	49.14%	402	49.39%	11	1.35%	-2	-0.25%	814
Lenawee	1,881	54.66%	1,509	43.85%	48	1.39%	372	10.81%	3,441
Livingston	784	61.44%	459	35.97%	33	2.59%	325	25.47%	1,276
Mackinac	49	56.98%	37	43.02%	0	0.00%	12	13.95%	86
Macomb	1,033	60.76%	660	38.82%	7	0.41%	373	21.94%	1,700
Monroe	1,112	66.75%	542	32.53%	11	0.66%	570	34.21%	1,666
Oakland	2,200	56.88%	1,478	38.21%	190	4.91%	722	18.67%	3,868
Ottawa	79	88.76%	8	8.99%	2	2.25%	71	79.78%	89
Saginaw	74	48.37%	78	50.98%	0	0.00%	-4	-2.61%	153
Shiawassee	203	50.00%	202	49.75%	0	0.00%	1	0.25%	406
St. Clair	459	57.38%	341	42.63%	0	0.00%	118	14.75%	800
St. Joseph	865	58.56%	611	41.37%	1	0.07%	254	17.20%	1,477
Van Buren	247	61.44%	142	35.32%	13	3.23%	105	26.12%	402
Washtenaw	2,012	51.24%	1,659	42.25%	247	6.29%	353	8.99%	3,927 (Note: Includes 9 Scattering votes)
Wayne	2,242	60.22%	1,346	36.15%	130	3.49%	896	24.07%	3,723 (Note: Includes 5 Scattering votes)
Total	20,993	55.65%	15,449	40.95%	1,223	3.24%	5,544	14.70%	37,724

===== Counties that flipped from Whig to Democratic =====
- Allegan
- Barry
- Berrien
- Calhoun
- Cass
- Hillsdale
- Ingham
- Jackson
- Kalamazoo
- Lenawee
- Macomb
- Oakland
- Shiawassee
- Washtenaw

===== Counties that flipped from Democratic to Whig =====
- Chippewa
- Saginaw
