= 1854 Michigan gubernatorial election =

- November 7, 1854
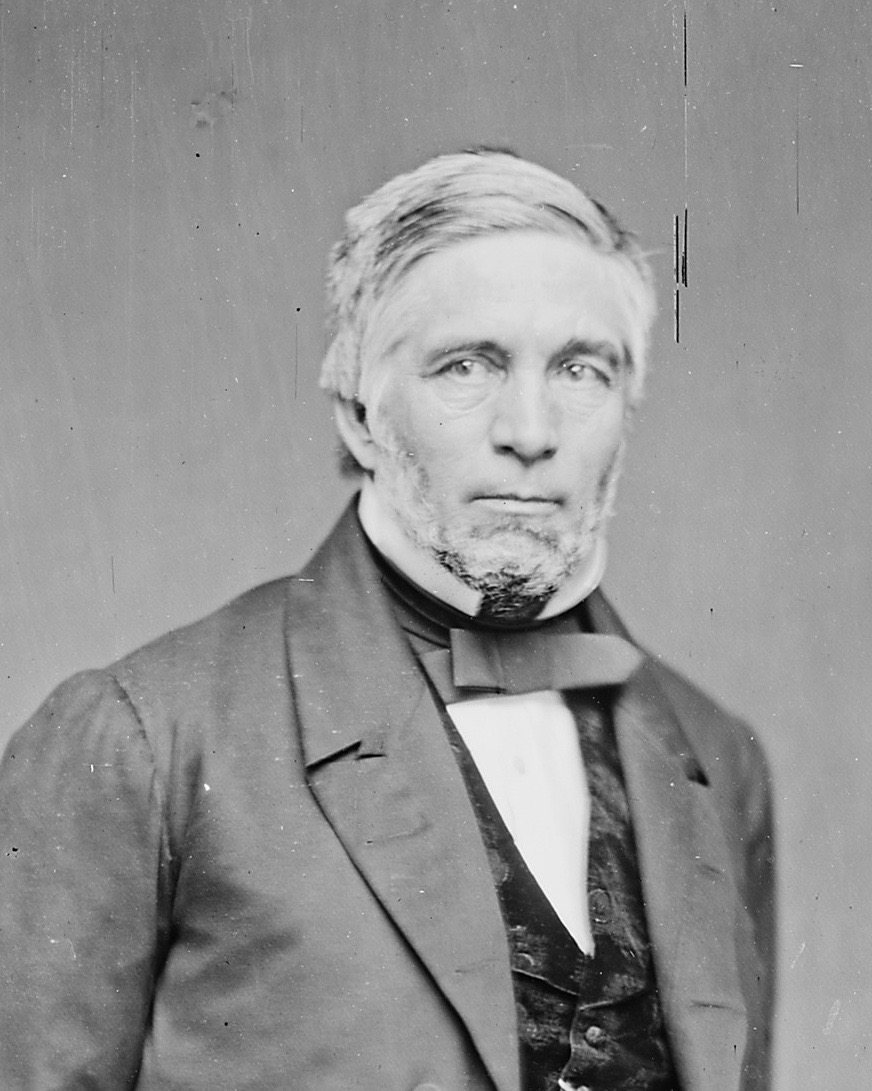

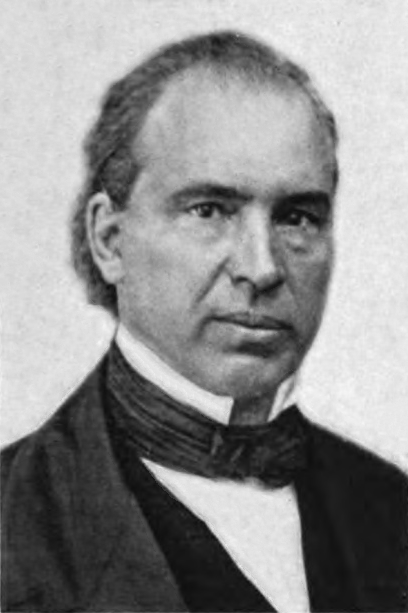
| Nominee | Kinsley S. Bingham | John S. Barry |
| Party | Republican | Democratic |
| Popular vote | 43,652 | 38,675 |
| Percentage | 53.00% | 46.96% |
- County results Bingham: 50–60% 60–70% 70–80% >90% Barry: 50–60% 70–80% >90% No Votes
Governor before election
Andrew Parsons
Democratic
Elected Governor
Kinsley S. Bingham
Republican

The 1854 Michigan gubernatorial election was held on November 7, 1854. Republican nominee Kinsley S. Bingham defeated Democratic nominee John S. Barry with 53.00% of the vote.

== General election ==
=== Candidates ===
Major party candidates

- Kinsley S. Bingham, Republican
- John S. Barry, Democratic

=== Results ===
1854 Michigan gubernatorial election
| Party | Candidate | Votes | % | ±% |
|---|---|---|---|---|
| Republican | Kinsley S. Bingham | 43,652 | 53.00% | |
| Democratic | John S. Barry | 38,675 | 46.96% | −4.38% |
| | Scattering | 25 | 0.03% | |
| | Imperfect (Note: These are ballots that were intended for the main candidates but contained misspellings. The canvass does not list specific variations, it just groups these votes together.) | 14 | 0.02% | |
| Majority | | 4,977 | 6.04% | |
| Total votes | | 82.366 | 100.00% | |
| Republican gain from Democratic | | Swing | +15.80% | |

==== Results By County ====
Allegan County, Lapeer County, Sanilac County, and Shiawassee County did not flip Republican in this election. However, Lapeer County would not vote Democratic again until 1924 while Allegan and Sanliac counties would not vote Democratic again until 1986.

| County | Kinsley S. Bingham Republican | | John S. Barry Democratic | | Margin | | Total votes cast |
| County | # | % | # | % | # | % | Total votes cast |
|---|---|---|---|---|---|---|---|
| Allegan | 689 | 48.73% | 725 | 51.27% | -36 | -2.55% | 1,414 |
| Allegan | 745 | 52.32% | 679 | 47.68% | 66 | 4.63% | 1,424 |
| Berrien | 1,034 | 52.01% | 952 | 47.89% | 82 | 4.12% | 1,988 (Note: Includes 2 Scattering votes) |
| Branch | 1,844 | 62.42% | 1,108 | 37.51% | 736 | 24.92% | 2,954 (Note: Includes 2 Imperfect votes) |
| Calhoun | 2,294 | 58.51% | 1,627 | 41.49% | 667 | 17.01% | 3,921 |
| Cass | 1,097 | 55.88% | 865 | 44.07% | 232 | 11.82% | 1,963 (Note: Includes 1 Imperfect vote) |
| Chippewa | 24 | 8.08% | 273 | 91.92% | -249 | -83.84% | 297 |
| Clinton | 648 | 53.91% | 554 | 46.09% | 94 | 7.82% | 1,202 |
| Eaton | 995 | 52.73% | 891 | 47.22% | 104 | 5.51% | 1,887 (Note: Includes 1 Scattering vote) |
| Emmet | 650 | 93.53% | 45 | 6.47% | 605 | 87.05% | 695 |
| Genesee | 1,416 | 58.18% | 1,018 | 41.82% | 398 | 16.35% | 2,434 |
| Grand Traverse | 194 | 55.59% | 155 | 44.41% | 39 | 11.17% | 349 |
| Hillsdale | 2,252 | 61.43% | 1,413 | 38.54% | 839 | 22.89% | 3,666 |
| Houghton | 174 (Note: Dubin contains a typo for Bingham in this county.) | 59.39% | 118 | 40.27% | 56 | 19.11% | 293 |
| Ingham | 939 | 44.27% | 1,182 | 55.73% | -243 | -11.46% | 2,121 |
| Ionia | 1,107 | 61.67% | 683 | 38.05% | 424 | 23.62% | 1,795 (Note: Includes 2 Scattering votes and 3 Imperfect votes) |
| Jackson | 2,061 | 53.87% | 1,755 | 45.87% | 306 | 8.00% | 3,826 (Note: Includes 7 Scattering votes and 3 Imperfect votes) |
| Kalamazoo | 1,733 | 59.27% | 1,191 | 40.73% | 542 | 18.54% | 2,924 |
| Kent | 1,540 | 50.72% | 1,493 | 49.18% | 47 | 1.55% | 3,036 (Note: Includes 3 Scattering votes) |
| Lapeer | 741 | 47.68% | 813 | 52.32% | -72 | -4.63% | 1,554 |
| Lenawee | 3,197 | 57.34% | 2,379 | 42.66% | 818 | 14.67% | 5,576 |
| Livingston | 1,130 | 46.01% | 1,326 | 53.99% | -196 | -7.98% | 2,456 |
| Mackinac | 3 | 2.33% | 126 | 97.67% | -123 | -95.35% | 129 |
| Macomb | 1,349 | 47.20% | 1,509 (Note: Dubin contains a typo for Barry in this county.) | 52.80% | -160 | -5.60% | 2,858 |
| Monroe | 1,184 | 44.34% | 1,484 | 55.58% | 300 | 11.24% | 2,670 |
| Montcalm | 208 | 52.00% | 192 | 48.00% | 16 | 4.00% | 400 |
| Newaygo | 140 | 50.72% | 136 | 49.28% | 4 | 1.45% | 276 |
| Oakland | 2,536 | 50.95% | 2,437 | 48.97% | 99 | 1.99% | 4,977 (Note: Includes 4 Imperfect votes) |
| Ontonagon | 193 | 70.96% | 79 | 29.04% | 114 | 41.91% | 272 |
| Ottawa | 624 | 46.12% | 729 | 53.88% | -105 | -7.76% | 1,353 |
| Saginaw | 544 | 45.45% | 651 | 54.39% | -107 | -8.94% | 1,197 |
| Sanilac | 143 | 27.93% | 368 | 71.88% | -225 | -43.95% | 512 |
| Shiawassee | 507 | 41.05% | 728 | 58.95% | -221 | -17.89% | 1,235 |
| St. Clair | 983 | 51.30% | 933 | 48.70% | 50 | 2.61% | 1,916 |
| St. Joseph | 1,418 | 55.89% | 1,119 | 44.11% | 299 | 11.79% | 2,537 |
| Tuscola | 172 | 61.43% | 108 | 38.57% | 64 | 22.86% | 280 |
| Van Buren | 839 | 54.45% | 698 | 45.30% | 141 | 9.15% | 1,541 (Note: Includes 4 Scattering votes) |
| Washtenaw | 2,829 | 57.05% | 2,130 | 42.95% | 699 | 14.10% | 4,959 |
| Wayne | 3,476 | 46.48% | 4,003 | 53.52% | -527 | -7.05% | 7,479 |
| Total | 43,652 | 53.00% | 38,675 | 46.96% | 4,977 | 6.04% | 82,366 |

===== Counties that flipped from Democratic to Republican =====
- Barry
- Berrien
- Branch
- Cass
- Eaton
- Hillsdale
- Ionia
- Kent
- Lenawee
- Montcalm
- Newaygo
- Oakland
- St. Clair
- St. Joseph
- Van Buren
- Washtenaw

===== Counties that flipped from Whig to Republican =====
- Calhoun
- Clinton
- Genesee
- Houghton
- Jackson
- Kalamazoo
- Tuscola

===== Counties that flipped from Whig to Democratic =====
- Chippewa
