= 1894 Michigan gubernatorial election =

- November 6, 1894
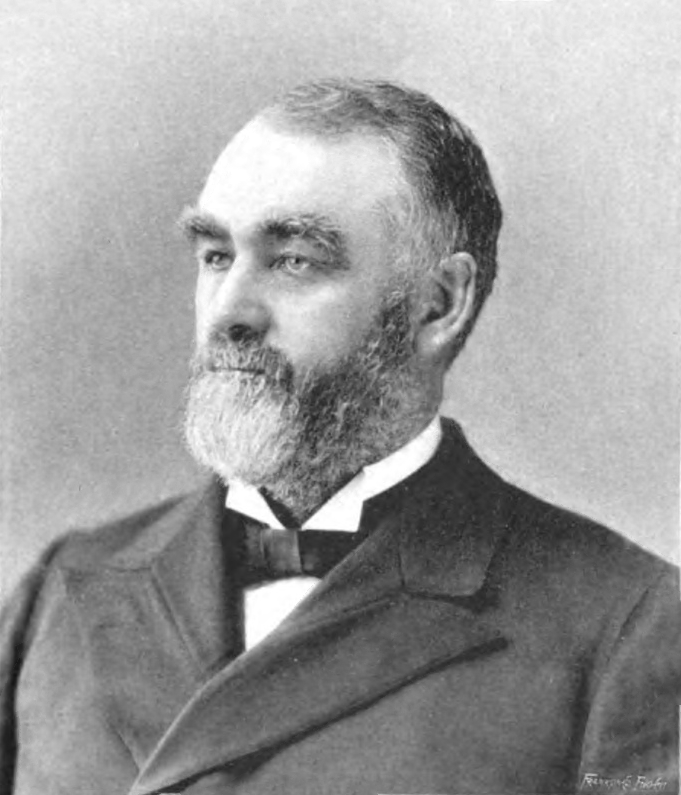

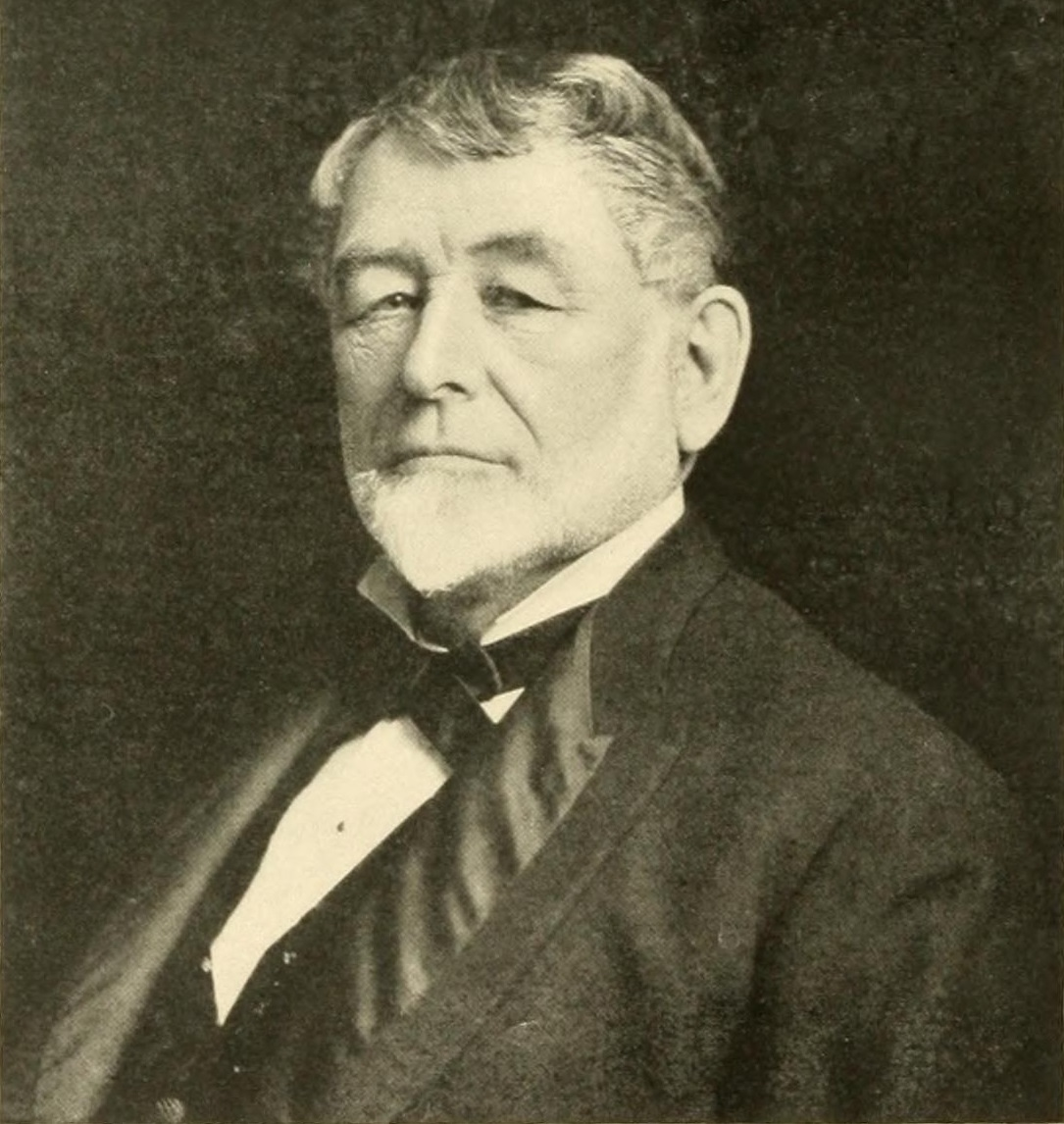

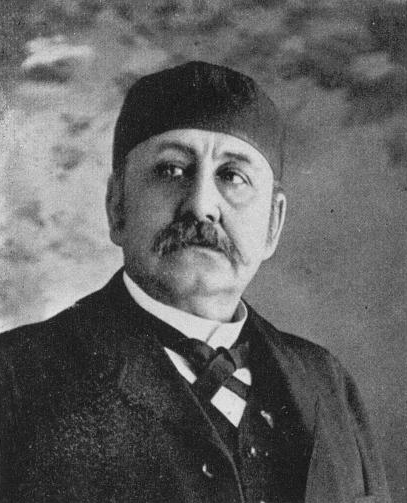
| Nominee | John T. Rich | Spencer O. Fisher | Alva W. Nichols |
| Party | Republican | Democratic | Populist |
| Popular vote | 237,215 | 130,823 | 30,012 |
| Percentage | 56.89% | 31.37% | 7.20% |
- County results Rich: 40–50% 50–60% 60–70% 70–80% 80–90% Fisher: 40–50% 50–60% Nichols: 30–40%
Governor before election
John T. Rich
Republican
Elected Governor
John T. Rich
Republican

The 1894 Michigan gubernatorial election was held on November 6, 1894. Incumbent Republican John T. Rich defeated Democratic candidate Spencer O. Fisher with 56.89% of the vote.

== General election ==
=== Candidates ===
Major party candidates

- John T. Rich, Republican
- Spencer O. Fisher, Democratic

Other candidates

- Alva W. Nichols, People's
- Albert M. Todd, Prohibition

=== Results ===
1894 Michigan gubernatorial election
| Party | Candidate | Votes | % | ±% |
|---|---|---|---|---|
| Republican | John T. Rich (inc.) | 237,215 | 56.89% | +9.68% |
| Democratic | Spencer O. Fisher | 130,823 | 31.37% | −12.40% |
| Populist | Alva W. Nichols | 30,012 | 7.20% | +2.63% |
| Prohibition | Albert M. Todd | 18,788 | 4.51% | +0.07% |
| | Blank | 142 | 0.03% | |
| | Scattering | 8 | 0.00% | |
| Majority | | 106,392 | 25.51% | |
| Total votes | | 416,988 | 100.00% | |
| Republican hold | | Swing | +22.08% | |

==== Results by county ====
Macomb County, Monroe County, Saginaw County, and Wayne County all voted Republican for the first time since 1872. After this election, Presque Isle County would not vote Democratic again until 1932.

| County | John T. Rich Republican | | Spencer O. Fisher Democratic | | Alva W. Nichols Populist | | Albert M. Todd Prohibition | | Margin | | Total votes cast |
| County | # | % | # | % | # | % | # | % | # | % | Total votes cast |
|---|---|---|---|---|---|---|---|---|---|---|---|
| Alcona | 641 | 69.83% | 257 | 28.00% | 3 | 0.33% | 17 | 1.85% | 384 | 41.83% | 918 |
| Alger | 304 | 52.41% | 269 | 46.38% | 0 | 0.00% | 7 | 1.21% | 35 | 6.03% | 580 |
| Allegan | 4,171 | 63.46% | 1,569 | 23.87% | 532 | 8.09% | 301 | 4.58% | 2,602 | 39.59% | 6,573 |
| Alpena | 1,841 | 54.18% | 1,488 | 43.79% | 40 | 1.18% | 29 | 0.85% | 353 | 10.39% | 3,398 |
| Antrim | 1,495 | 60.97% | 401 | 16.35% | 302 | 12.32% | 254 | 10.36% | 1,094 | 44.62% | 2,452 |
| Arenac | 427 | 35.79% | 286 | 23.97% | 452 | 37.89% | 28 | 2.35% | -25 (Note: Nichols' margin over Rich) | -2.10% | 1,193 |
| Baraga | 454 | 52.55% | 381 | 44.10% | 17 | 1.97% | 12 | 1.39% | 73 | 8.45% | 864 |
| Barry | 3,062 | 57.48% | 1,329 | 24.95% | 600 | 11.26% | 336 | 6.31% | 1,733 | 32.53% | 5,327 |
| Bay | 4,365 | 42.52% | 4,933 | 48.05% | 866 | 8.44% | 101 | 0.98% | -568 | -5.53% | 10,266 (Note: Includes 1 Scattering vote) |
| Benzie | 830 | 58.57% | 257 | 18.14% | 227 | 16.02% | 103 | 7.27% | 573 | 40.44% | 1,417 |
| Berrien | 5,563 | 58.15% | 3,276 | 34.25% | 327 | 3.42% | 400 | 4.18% | 2,287 | 23.91% | 9,566 |
| Branch | 3,264 | 58.23% | 1,080 | 19.27% | 903 | 16.11% | 358 | 6.39% | 2,184 | 38.97% | 5,605 |
| Calhoun | 4,507 | 56.31% | 1,923 | 24.03% | 968 | 12.09% | 606 | 7.57% | 2,584 | 32.28% | 8,004 |
| Cass | 2,766 | 56.46% | 1,458 | 29.76% | 514 | 10.49% | 161 | 3.29% | 1,308 | 26.70% | 4,899 |
| Charlevoix | 1,069 | 64.17% | 234 | 14.05% | 234 | 14.05% | 129 | 7.74% | 835 | 50.12% | 1,666 |
| Cheboygan | 1,403 | 51.83% | 1,118 | 41.30% | 123 | 4.54% | 63 | 2.33% | 285 | 10.53% | 2,707 |
| Chippewa | 1,745 | 64.08% | 895 | 32.87% | 36 | 1.32% | 47 | 1.73% | 850 | 31.22% | 2,723 |
| Clare | 788 | 50.77% | 490 | 31.57% | 20 | 1.29% | 254 | 16.37% | 298 | 19.20% | 1,552 |
| Clinton | 2,919 | 54.28% | 1,753 | 32.60% | 435 | 8.09% | 271 | 5.04% | 1,166 | 21.68% | 5,378 |
| Crawford | 359 | 49.72% | 293 | 40.58% | 66 | 9.14% | 3 | 0.42% | 66 | 9.14% | 722 |
| Delta | 1,958 | 69.09% | 507 | 17.89% | 338 | 11.93% | 31 | 1.09% | 1,451 | 51.20% | 2,834 |
| Dickinson | 1,708 | 79.18% | 361 | 16.74% | 36 | 1.67% | 52 | 2.41% | 1,347 | 62.45% | 2,157 |
| Eaton | 4,029 | 58.37% | 1,720 | 24.92% | 797 | 11.55% | 355 | 5.14% | 2,309 | 33.45% | 6,902 |
| Emmet | 1,315 | 57.10% | 787 | 34.17% | 100 | 4.34% | 101 | 4.39% | 528 | 22.93% | 2,303 |
| Genesee | 5,161 | 59.63% | 2,622 | 30.29% | 295 | 3.41% | 576 | 6.66% | 2,539 | 29.34% | 8,655 |
| Gladwin | 615 | 70.21% | 218 | 24.89% | 23 | 2.63% | 20 | 2.28% | 397 | 45.32% | 876 |
| Gogebic | 1,986 | 69.49% | 433 | 15.15% | 409 | 14.31% | 30 | 1.05% | 2,553 | 54.34% | 2,858 |
| Grand Traverse | 1,847 | 67.24% | 363 | 13.21% | 380 | 13.83% | 157 | 5.72% | 1,467 (Note: Rich's margin over Nichols) | 53.41% | 2,747 |
| Gratiot | 3,020 | 56.63% | 831 | 15.58% | 1,258 | 23.59% | 224 | 4.20% | 2,189 | 41.05% | 5,333 |
| Hillsdale | 3,894 | 60.85% | 1,460 | 22.82% | 631 | 9.86% | 414 | 6.47% | 2,434 | 38.04% | 6,399 |
| Houghton | 3,734 | 56.69% | 1,358 | 20.62% | 671 | 10.19% | 824 | 12.51% | 2,376 | 36.07% | 6,587 |
| Huron | 2,447 | 48.26% | 1,983 | 39.11% | 525 | 10.36% | 115 | 2.27% | 464 | 9.15% | 5,070 |
| Ingham | 4,668 | 52.03% | 2,563 | 28.57% | 1,185 | 13.21% | 554 | 6.18% | 2,105 | 23.46% | 8,971 |
| Ionia | 4,351 | 57.14% | 2,570 | 33.75% | 360 | 4.73% | 298 | 3.91% | 1,781 | 23.39% | 7,614 (Note: Includes 34 Blank votes and 1 Scattering vote) |
| Iosco | 1,463 | 61.44% | 840 | 35.28% | 52 | 2.18% | 26 | 1.09% | 623 | 26.17% | 2,381 |
| Iron | 663 | 63.51% | 336 | 32.18% | 28 | 2.68% | 17 | 1.63% | 327 | 31.32% | 1,044 |
| Isabella | 2,152 | 54.27% | 1,160 | 29.26% | 452 | 11.40% | 201 | 5.07% | 992 | 25.02% | 3,965 |
| Jackson | 5,796 | 54.30% | 3,548 | 33.24% | 758 | 7.10% | 572 | 5.36% | 2,248 | 21.06% | 10,674 |
| Kalamazoo | 4,480 | 58.08% | 2,102 | 27.25% | 558 | 7.23% | 573 | 7.43% | 2,378 | 30.83% | 7,713 |
| Kalkaska | 881 | 74.16% | 229 | 19.28% | 25 | 2.10% | 53 | 4.46% | 652 | 54.88% | 1,188 |
| Kent | 11,960 | 58.00% | 6,180 | 29.97% | 1,318 | 6.39% | 1,163 | 5.64% | 5,780 | 28.03% | 20,621 |
| Keweenaw | 281 | 81.92% | 57 | 16.62% | 2 | 0.58% | 3 | 0.87% | 224 | 65.31% | 343 |
| Lake | 756 | 62.63% | 347 | 28.75% | 64 | 5.30% | 40 | 3.31% | 409 | 33.89% | 1,207 |
| Lapeer | 3,405 | 61.71% | 1,677 | 30.39% | 168 | 3.04% | 268 | 4.86% | 1,728 | 31.32% | 5,518 |
| Leelanau | 992 | 64.04% | 385 | 24.85% | 131 | 8.46% | 41 | 2.65% | 607 | 39.19% | 1,549 |
| Lenawee | 6,532 | 56.28% | 4,066 | 35.03% | 187 | 1.61% | 822 | 7.08% | 2,466 | 21.25% | 11,607 |
| Livingston | 2,592 | 49.86% | 1,754 | 33.74% | 526 | 10.12% | 327 | 6.29% | 838 | 16.12% | 5,199 |
| Luce | 337 | 59.96% | 182 | 32.38% | 20 | 3.56% | 23 | 4.09% | 155 | 27.58% | 562 |
| Mackinac | 569 | 47.34% | 611 | 50.83% | 11 | 0.92% | 11 | 0.92% | -42 | -3.49% | 1,202 |
| Macomb | 3,479 | 52.11% | 2,889 | 43.27% | 106 | 1.59% | 202 | 3.03% | 590 | 8.84% | 6,676 |
| Manistee | 1,961 | 47.67% | 1,654 | 40.20% | 420 | 10.21% | 79 | 1.92% | 307 | 7.46% | 4,114 |
| Manitou | 43 | 34.40% | 82 | 65.60% | 0 | 0.00% | 0 | 0.00% | -39 | -31.20% | 125 |
| Marquette | 3,945 | 65.95% | 1,041 | 17.40% | 651 | 10.88% | 345 | 5.77% | 2,904 | 48.55% | 5,982 |
| Mason | 1,643 | 56.23% | 891 | 30.49% | 225 | 7.70% | 163 | 5.58% | 752 | 25.74% | 2,922 |
| Mecosta | 2,054 | 64.79% | 741 | 23.38% | 246 | 7.76% | 129 | 4.07% | 1,313 | 41.42% | 3,170 |
| Menominee | 2,373 | 66.23% | 946 | 26.40% | 225 | 6.28% | 39 | 1.09% | 1,427 | 39.83% | 3,583 |
| Midland | 1,338 | 59.49% | 549 | 24.41% | 291 | 12.94% | 71 | 3.16% | 789 | 35.08% | 2,249 |
| Missaukee | 902 | 60.46% | 463 | 31.03% | 28 | 1.88% | 99 | 6.64% | 439 | 29.42% | 1,492 |
| Monroe | 3,601 | 52.49% | 2,917 | 42.52% | 133 | 1.94% | 209 | 3.05% | 684 | 9.97% | 6,861 |
| Montcalm | 3,671 | 65.66% | 1,037 | 18.55% | 662 | 11.84% | 221 | 3.95% | 2,634 | 47.11% | 5,591 |
| Montmorency | 448 | 58.41% | 302 | 39.37% | 5 | 0.65% | 11 | 1.43% | 146 | 19.04% | 767 |
| Muskegon | 3,999 | 60.58% | 1,410 | 21.36% | 943 | 14.29% | 249 | 3.77% | 2,589 | 39.22% | 6,601 |
| Newaygo | 2,239 | 61.26% | 827 | 22.63% | 360 | 9.85% | 229 | 6.27% | 1,412 | 38.63% | 3,655 |
| Oakland | 5,148 | 50.53% | 3,997 | 39.23% | 151 | 1.48% | 892 | 8.76% | 1,151 | 11.30% | 10,188 |
| Oceana | 2,082 | 60.14% | 928 | 26.81% | 130 | 3.76% | 322 | 9.30% | 1,154 | 33.33% | 3,462 |
| Ogemaw | 745 | 59.60% | 370 | 29.60% | 114 | 9.12% | 21 | 1.68% | 375 | 30.00% | 1,250 |
| Ontonagon | 870 | 54.89% | 654 | 41.26% | 48 | 3.03% | 13 | 0.82% | 216 | 13.63% | 1,585 |
| Osceola | 1,689 | 65.90% | 447 | 17.44% | 135 | 5.27% | 292 | 11.39% | 1,242 | 48.46% | 2,563 |
| Oscoda | 272 | 68.51% | 113 | 28.46% | 6 | 1.51% | 6 | 1.51% | 159 | 40.05% | 397 |
| Otsego | 698 | 56.61% | 499 | 40.47% | 17 | 1.38% | 19 | 1.54% | 199 | 16.14% | 1,233 |
| Ottawa | 3,910 | 62.49% | 1,747 | 27.92% | 460 | 7.35% | 140 | 2.24% | 2,163 | 34.57% | 6,257 |
| Presque Isle | 458 | 47.96% | 491 | 51.41% | 3 | 0.31% | 3 | 0.31% | -33 | -3.46% | 955 |
| Roscommon | 303 | 59.18% | 192 | 37.50% | 9 | 1.76% | 8 | 1.56% | 111 | 21.68% | 512 |
| Saginaw | 6,499 | 49.61% | 5,177 | 39.52% | 1,254 | 9.57% | 171 | 1.31% | 1,322 | 10.09% | 13,101 |
| Sanilac | 2,724 | 54.28% | 1,218 | 24.27% | 693 | 13.81% | 383 | 7.63% | 1,506 | 30.01% | 5,018 |
| Schoolcraft | 770 | 52.85% | 477 | 32.74% | 183 | 12.56% | 27 | 1.85% | 293 | 20.11% | 1,457 |
| Shiawassee | 3,739 | 54.45% | 2,002 | 29.15% | 242 | 3.52% | 884 | 12.87% | 1,737 | 25.29% | 6,867 |
| St. Clair | 5,926 | 54.82% | 4,247 | 39.29% | 282 | 2.61% | 246 | 2.28% | 1,679 | 15.53% | 10,809 (Note: Includes 108 Blank votes) |
| St. Joseph | 2,876 | 52.33% | 1,380 | 25.11% | 1,056 | 19.21% | 184 | 3.35% | 1,496 | 27.22% | 5,496 |
| Tuscola | 3,270 | 58.26% | 1,385 | 24.67% | 579 | 10.32% | 379 | 6.75% | 1,885 | 33.58% | 5,613 |
| Van Buren | 3,751 | 64.02% | 1,112 | 18.98% | 709 | 12.10% | 287 | 4.90% | 2,639 | 45.04% | 5,859 |
| Washtenaw | 5,007 | 51.70% | 4,151 | 42.86% | 126 | 1.30% | 400 | 4.13% | 856 | 8.84% | 9,684 |
| Wayne | 27,712 | 57.02% | 19,088 | 39.28% | 1,244 | 2.56% | 555 | 1.14% | 8,624 | 17.75% | 48,599 |
| Wexford | 1,505 | 62.55% | 459 | 19.08% | 303 | 12.59% | 139 | 5.78% | 1,046 | 43.47% | 2,406 |
| Total | 237,215 | 56.89% | 130,823 | 31.37% | 30,012 | 7.20% | 18,788 | 4.51% | 106,392 | 25.51% | 416,988 |

===== Counties that flipped from Democratic to Republican =====
- Alpena
- Baraga
- Cheboygan
- Clare
- Crawford
- Emmet
- Huron
- Macomb
- Manistee
- Monroe
- Montmorency
- Oakland
- Ontonagon
- Otsego
- Roscommon
- Saginaw
- Schoolcraft
- Washtenaw
- Wayne
