= 1849 Michigan gubernatorial election =

- November 6, 1849
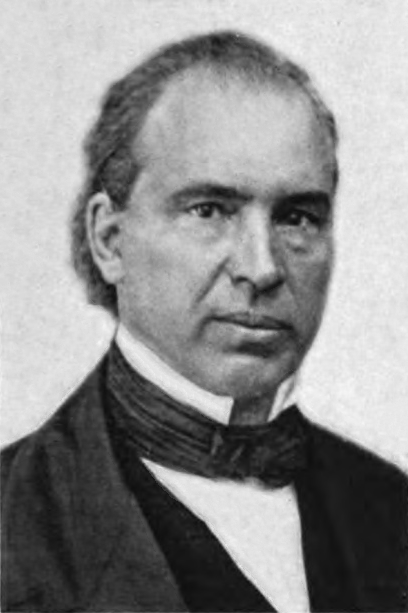

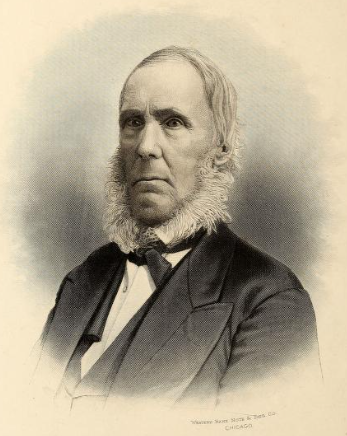
Nominee	John S. Barry	Flavius J. Littlejohn
Party	Democratic	Whig
Popular vote	27,837	23,540
Percentage	53.98%	45.65%
- County results Barry: 50–60% 60–70% Littlejohn: 50–60% No Data/Votes
Governor before election
Epaphroditus Ransom
Democratic
Elected Governor
John S. Barry
Democratic

The 1849 Michigan gubernatorial election was held on November 6, 1849. Democratic nominee John S. Barry defeated Whig nominee Flavius J. Littlejohn with 53.98% of the vote.

== General election ==
=== Candidates ===
Major party candidates

- John S. Barry, Democratic
- Flavius J. Littlejohn, Whig

=== Results ===
1849 Michigan gubernatorial election
Party	Candidate	Votes	%	±%
Democratic	John S. Barry	27,837	53.98%	+0.83%
Whig	Flavius J. Littlejohn	23,540	45.65%	+4.68%
	Scattering	192	0.37%	
Majority		4,297	8.33%	
Total votes		51,569	100.00%	
Democratic hold		Swing	-3.85%	

==== Results By County ====
County	John S. Barry Democratic		Flavius J. Littlejohn Whig		Scattering Write-in		Margin		Total votes cast
County	#	%	#	%	#	%	#	%	Total votes cast
Allegan	342	54.46%	233	37.10%	53	8.44%	109	17.36%	628
Allegan	448	59.03%	311	40.97%	0	0.00%	137	18.05%	759
Berrien	901	59.55%	608	40.19%	4	0.26%	293	19.37%	1,513
Branch	1,075	60.46%	696	39.15%	7	0.39%	379	21.32%	1,778
Calhoun	1,430	46.28%	1,657	53.62%	3	0.10%	-227	-7.35%	3,090
Cass	894	58.93%	620	40.87%	3	0.20%	274	18.06%	1,517
Chippewa	40	40.82%	58	59.18%	0	0.00%	-18	-18.37%	98
Clinton	288	52.55%	260	47.45%	0	0.00%	28	5.11%	548
Eaton	452	49.24%	464	50.54%	2	0.22%	-12	-1.31%	918
Genesee (Note: Dubin transposes the votes for Barry and Littlejohn in this county.)	755	44.60%	937	55.35%	1	0.06%	-182	-10.75%	1,693
Hillsdale	1,260	53.57%	1,075	45.71%	17	0.72%	185	7.87%	2,352
Houghton	84	67.74%	40	32.26%	0	0.00%	44	35.48%	124
Ingham	716	50.96%	687	48.90%	2	0.14%	29	2.06%	1,405
Ionia	590	47.50%	649	52.25%	3	0.24%	-59	-4.75%	1,242
Jackson	1,427	49.34%	1,464	50.62%	1	0.03%	-37	-1.28%	2,892
Kalamazoo	843	50.36%	819	48.92%	12	0.72%	24	1.43%	1,674
Kent	744	53.30%	646	46.28%	6	0.43%	98	7.02%	1,396
Lapeer	487	57.36%	361	42.52%	1	0.12%	126	14.84%	849
Lenawee	1,928	51.61%	1,794	48.02%	14	0.37%	134	3.59%	3,736
Livingston	1,040	60.82%	666	38.95%	4	0.23%	374	21.87%	1,710
Mackinac	145	66.82%	72	33.18%	0	0.00%	73	33.64%	217
Macomb	1,176	61.06%	748	38.84%	2	0.10%	428	22.22%	1,926
Monroe	888	59.12%	611	40.68%	3	0.20%	277	18.44%	1,502
Oakland	2,481	55.58%	1,978	44.31%	5	0.11%	503	11.27%	4,464
Ottawa	231	68.34%	105	31.07%	2	0.59%	126	37.28%	338
Saginaw	210	59.83%	141	40.17%	0	0.00%	69	19.66%	351
Shiawassee	483	55.65%	366	42.17%	19	2.19%	117	13.48%	868
St. Clair	734	58.49%	521	41.51%	0	0.00%	213	16.97%	1,255
St. Joseph	1,044	54.63%	859	44.95%	8	0.42%	185	9.68%	1,911
Van Buren	478	54.75%	394	45.13%	1	0.11%	84	9.62%	873
Washtenaw	1,874	48.22%	2,006	51.62%	6	0.15%	-132	-3.40%	3,886
Wayne	2,349	57.91%	1,694	41.77%	13	0.32%	655	16.15%	4,056
Total	27,837	53.98%	23,540	45.65%	192	0.37%	4,297	8.33%	51,569

===== Counties that flipped from Democratic to Whig =====
- Calhoun
- Eaton
- Genesee
- Ionia
- Jackson
- Washtenaw
