= 1843 Michigan gubernatorial election =

- November 6–7, 1843
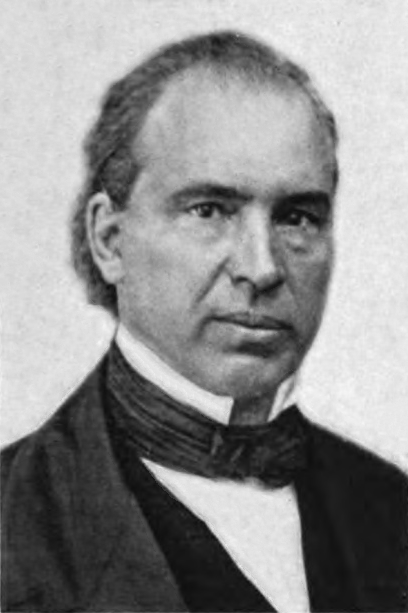

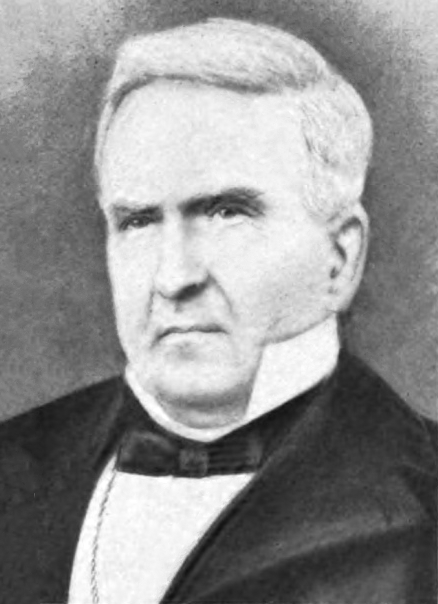

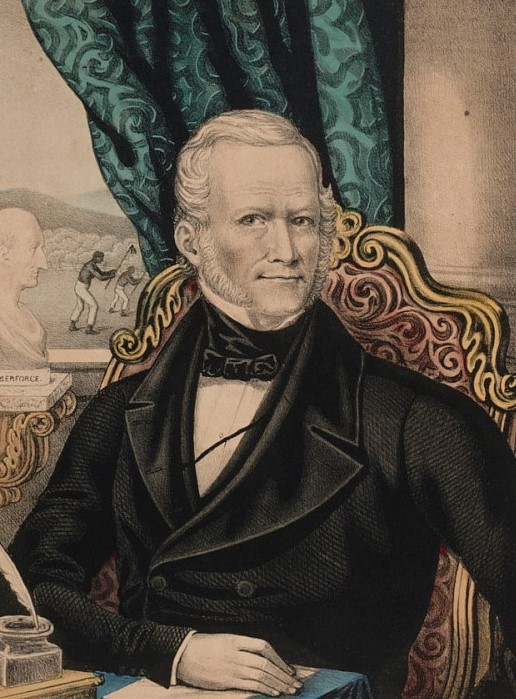
Nominee	John S. Barry	Zina Pitcher	James G. Birney
Party	Democratic	Whig	Liberty
Popular vote	21,392	14,899	2,776
Percentage	54.66%	38.07%	7.09%
- County results Barry: 40–50% 50–60% 60–70% 70–80% Pitcher: 40–50% 50–60% No Data/Votes
Governor before election
John S. Barry
Democratic
Elected Governor
John S. Barry
Democratic

The 1843 Michigan gubernatorial election was held from November 6 to 7, 1843. Incumbent Democrat John S. Barry defeated Whig nominee Zina Pitcher and Liberty nominee James G. Birney.

== General election ==
=== Candidates ===
Major party candidates

- John S. Barry, Democratic
- Zina Pitcher, Whig

Other candidates

- James G. Birney, Liberty

=== Results ===
1843 Michigan gubernatorial election
Party	Candidate	Votes	%	±%
Democratic	John S. Barry (inc.)	21,392	54.66%	−0.99%
Whig	Zina Pitcher	14,899	38.07%	−2.89%
Liberty	James G. Birney	2,776	7.09%	+3.85%
	Scattering	72	0.18%	
Majority		6,493	16.59%	
Total votes		39,139	100.00%	
Democratic hold		Swing	+1.89%	

==== Results By County ====
County	John S. Barry Democratic		Zina Pitcher Whig		James G. Birney Liberty		Margin		Total votes cast
County	#	%	#	%	#	%	#	%	Total votes cast
Allegan	237	47.40%	260	52.00%	3	0.60%	-23	-4.60%	500
Barry	201	54.62%	165	44.84%	2	0.54%	36	9.78%	368
Berrien	576	53.48%	471	43.73%	27	2.51%	105	9.75%	1,077 (Note: Includes 3 Scattering votes)
Branch	619	63.03%	304	30.96%	59	6.01%	315	32.08%	982
Calhoun	1,162	54.22%	777	36.26%	204	9.52%	385	17.97%	2,143
Cass	510	46.53%	531	48.45%	55	5.02%	-21	-1.92%	1,096
Chippewa	45	66.08%	23	33.82%	0	0.00%	22	32.35%	68
Clinton	225	51.37%	203	46.35%	10	2.28%	22	5.02%	438
Eaton	278	43.92%	297	46.92%	54	8.53%	-19	-3.00%	633 (Note: Includes 4 Scattering votes)
Genesee	549	48.71%	441	39.13%	117	10.38%	108	9.58%	1,127 (Note: Includes 20 Scattering votes)
Hillsdale	767	50.53%	549	36.17%	193	12.71%	218	14.36%	1,518 (Note: Includes 9 Scattering votes)
Ingham	311	49.84%	272	43.59%	41	6.57%	39	6.25%	624
Ionia	316	50.89%	267	43.00%	38	6.12%	49	7.89%	621
Jackson	1,162	52.15%	675	30.30%	391	17.55%	487	21.86%	2,228
Kalamazoo	671	45.43%	602	40.76%	204	13.81%	69	4.67%	1,477
Kent	405	60.54%	246	36.77%	16	2.39%	159	23.77%	669 (Note: Includes 2 Scattering votes)
Lapeer	412	53.23%	325	41.99%	36	4.65%	87	11.24%	774 (Note: Includes 1 Scattering vote)
Lenawee	1,918	56.85%	1,260	37.34%	196	5.81%	658	19.50%	3,374
Livingston	804	63.16%	403	31.66%	65	5.11%	401	31.50%	1,273
Mackinac	47	41.96%	65	58.04%	0	0.00%	-18	-16.07%	112
Macomb	889	56.88%	594	38.00%	72	4.61%	295	18.87%	1,563 (Note: Includes 8 Scattering votes)
Monroe	1,121	66.45%	522	30.94%	41	2.43%	599	35.51%	1,687
Oakland	2,161	58.64%	1,173	31.83%	349	9.47%	988	26.81%	3,685
Ottawa	85	72.65%	21	17.95%	11	9.40%	64	54.70%	117
Saginaw	101	59.06%	70	40.94%	0	0.00%	31	18.13%	171
Shiawassee	236	53.03%	171	38.43%	36	8.09%	65	14.61%	445
St. Clair	534	56.57%	408	43.22%	0	0.00%	126	13.35%	944
St. Joseph	822	58.17%	488	34.54%	103	7.29%	334	23.64%	1,413
Van Buren	271	59.69%	172	37.89%	11	2.42%	99	21.81%	454
Washtenaw	1,843	48.02%	1,684	43.88%	311	8.10%	159	4.14%	3,838
Wayne	2,114	55.35%	1,560	40.85%	130	3.40%	554	14.51%	3,819 (Note: Includes 15 Scattering votes)
Total	21,392	54.66%	14,899 (Note: The county results add up to 14,999.)	38.07%	2,776 (Note: The county results add up to 2,775.)	7.09%	6,493	16.59%	39,139

===== Counties that flipped from Whig to Democratic =====
- Chippewa
- Genesee
- Lapeer
- Saginaw

===== Counties that flipped from Democratic to Whig =====
- Allegan
- Cass
- Mackinac
