= John S. Barry =

American politician

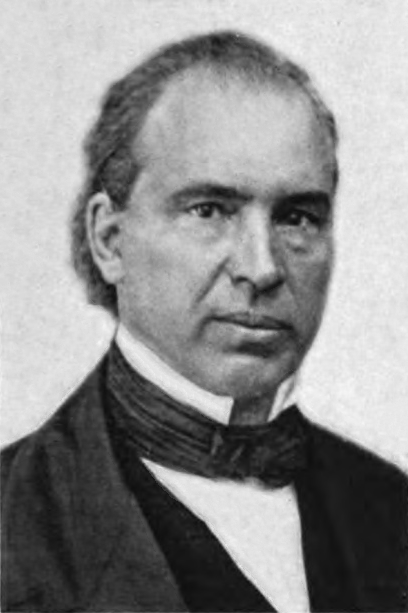

4th & 8th Governor of Michigan
- In office January 3, 1842 – January 5, 1846
- Lieutenant: Origen D. Richardson
- Preceded by: J. Wright Gordon
- Succeeded by: Alpheus Felch
- In office January 7, 1850 – January 1, 1852
- Lieutenant: William M. Fenton
- Preceded by: Epaphroditus Ransom
- Succeeded by: Robert McClelland

Member of the Michigan Senate from the 3rd district
- In office November 2, 1835 – January 6, 1839
- In office January 4, 1841 – January 2, 1842

Personal details
- Born: January 29, 1802 Amherst, New Hampshire, U.S.
- Died: January 14, 1870 (aged 67) Constantine, Michigan, U.S.
- Party: Democratic
- Spouse: Mary Kidder

John Stewart Barry (January 29, 1802 – January 14, 1870) was the fourth and eighth governor of Michigan. He was Michigan's only three-term governor in the 19th century. His main accomplishment was to rationalize state finances after the state's internal improvements fiasco.

== Early life in New Hampshire and Vermont ==
Barry was born in Amherst, New Hampshire, to John and Ellen (Steward) Barry. While he was young, the family moved to Rockingham, Vermont, where he worked on his father's farm and received an education in the local schools. He married Mary Kidder, of Grafton, Vermont, and in 1824 went to Georgia, Vermont, where he taught school while studying law. He began to practice law, and while in Georgia he was also a member of the Governor’s staff. Barry was of primarily English ancestry but was also partially of Welsh descent. The bulk of his immigrant ancestors came to New England from England as Puritans in the 1630s and 1640s. Out of his 32 great-great-great grandparents, 31 of them were from Puritans from England and 1 of them was an Anglican from Montgomeryshire, Wales.

== Life and politics in Michigan ==
In 1831, he moved to White Pigeon, Michigan, where he became a merchant and was active in politics. In 1834, Barry moved to Constantine, Michigan, and opened a general store in that village's first frame-built building. He became justice of the peace in 1831 while in White Pigeon and continued until 1835. Barry was a prominent participant from the 13th district in the 1835 convention that drafted Michigan's first constitution.

When Michigan became a state of the Union in 1837, Barry was a state senator (1836, 1840) and was recognized as a leader of the state Democratic Party. In 1840, Barry became deeply interested in the cultivation of the sugar beet and visited Europe to obtain information in reference to its culture.

== 4th and 8th Governor of Michigan ==
He was selected by the Democratic Party to run for governor in 1841. He won that election and was reelected in 1843.

During Barry's first term, the University of Michigan first opened for students in 1841 in Ann Arbor after moving there from Detroit. The Michigan Central and Michigan Southern Railroads greatly expanded. In 1845, at the end of his second term, the population of the state was more than 300,000.

After a hiatus, the popular Barry was again elected governor in 1849, serving from 1850 to 1852, becoming the first Michigan governor to serve non-consecutive terms. During Barry’s third term the Normal School (now Eastern Michigan University) was established in Ypsilanti. A new state constitution was adopted in 1850. He was defeated in his 1854 run for the reelection and again ran unsuccessfully in 1860.

He also ran unsuccessfully to be a U.S. Representative from Michigan’s 2nd congressional district in 1856 against Republican Henry Waldron.

Throughout his career, he was a supporter of the Wilmot Proviso, intended to stop the spread of slavery, but he remained a member of the Democratic Party, becoming sympathetic with the "ultra" wing during the Civil War. He was a delegate to the Democratic National Conventions of 1856 and 1864.

== Retirement and death ==
Barry retired to private life after the beginning of the ascendancy of the Republican Party during Reconstruction, and carried on his mercantile business at Constantine. He died at age 67, his wife's death having occurred a year previous, on March 30.

Barry's home in Constantine, the Governor John S. Barry House, has been listed on the National Register of Historic Places since 1972.

Party political offices
Preceded by Elon Farnsworth	Democratic nominee for Governor of Michigan; 1841, 1843	Succeeded by Alpheus Felch
Preceded by Epaphroditus Ransom	Democratic nominee for Governor of Michigan; 1849	Succeeded by Robert McClelland
Preceded by Robert McClelland	Democratic nominee for Governor of Michigan; 1854	Succeeded by Alpheus Felch
Preceded by Charles E. Stuart	Democratic nominee for Governor of Michigan; 1860	Succeeded by Byron G. Stout
Political offices
Preceded by J. Wright Gordon	Governor of Michigan; 1842–1846	Succeeded by Alpheus Felch
Preceded by Epaphroditus Ransom	Governor of Michigan; 1850–1852	Succeeded by Robert McClelland
