= 1872 Michigan gubernatorial election =

- November 5, 1872
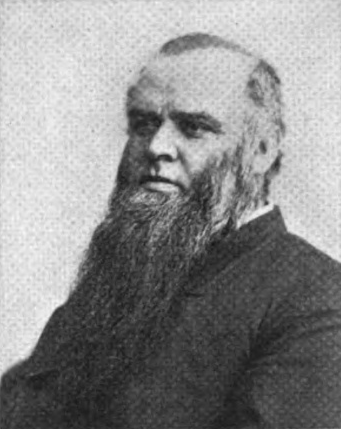

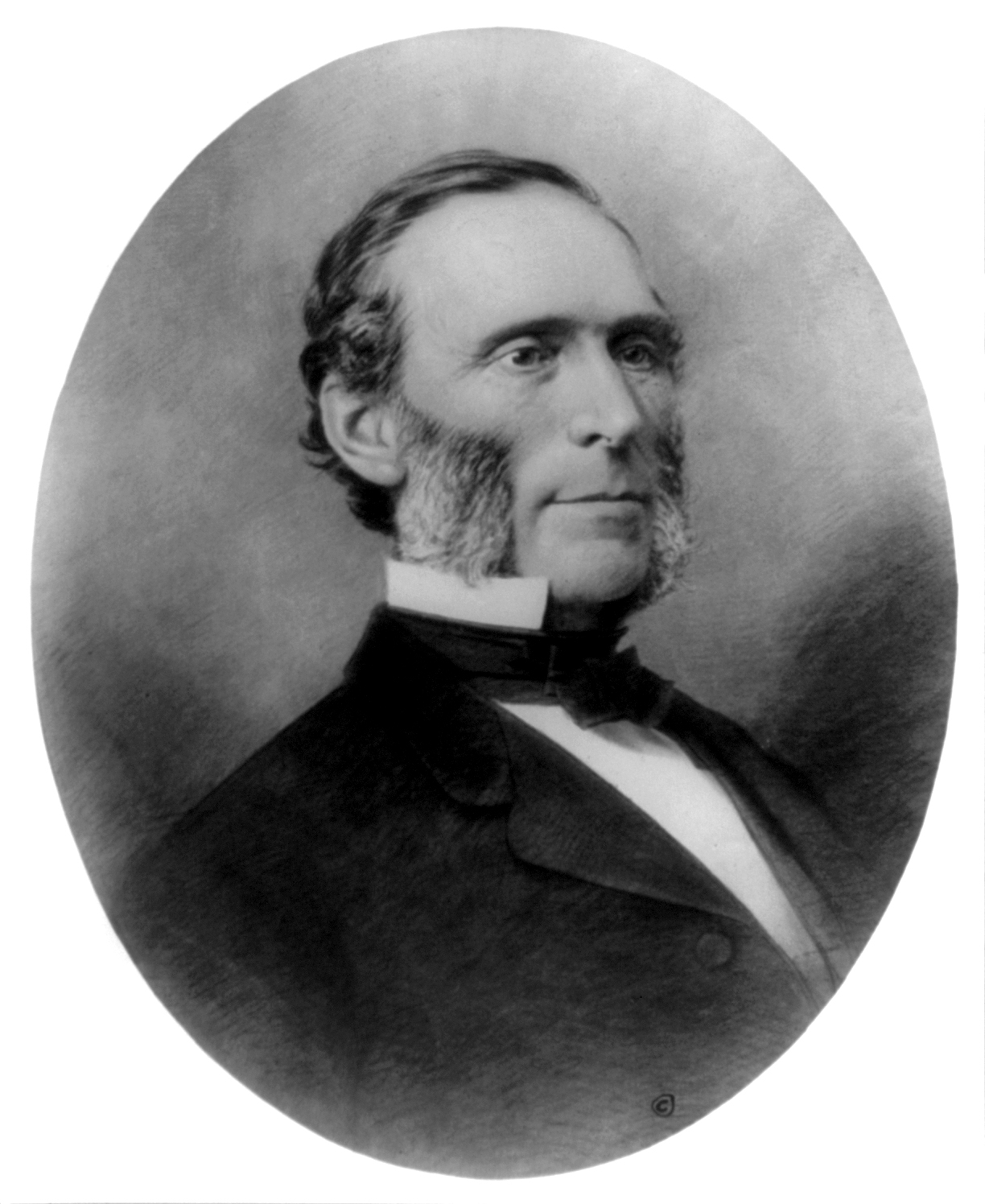
Nominee	John J. Bagley	Austin Blair
Party	Republican	Liberal Republican
Popular vote	137,606	80,961
Percentage	61.83%	36.38%
- County results Bagley: 50–60% 60–70% 70–80% 80–90% >90% Blair: 50–60% 60–70% No Data
Governor before election
Henry P. Baldwin
Republican
Elected Governor
John J. Bagley
Republican

The 1872 Michigan gubernatorial election was held on November 5, 1872. Republican nominee John J. Bagley defeated Liberal Republican nominee Austin Blair with 61.83% of the vote.

== General election ==
=== Candidates ===
- John J. Bagley, member of the Detroit Board of Police Commissioners (Republican)
- Austin Blair, U.S. Representative from Jackson and former Governor (Liberal Republican)
- William M. Ferry, former State Representative from Spring Lake and brother of U.S. Senator Thomas W. Ferry (Democratic)
- Henry Fish (Prohibition)

=== Results ===
1872 Michigan gubernatorial election (Note: Imperfect votes have been assigned to their respective intended candidates. Certified totals: Bagley 137,602; Blair 80,958; Ferry 2,720; Fish 1,231; Imperfect 18; Scattering 15; Blank 6.)
Party	Candidate	Votes	%	±%
Republican	John J. Bagley	137,606	61.83%	+8.12%
Liberal Republican	Austin Blair	80,961	36.38%	−8.42%
Straight-Out Democratic	William M. Ferry	2,731	1.23%	
Prohibition	Henry Fish	1,231	0.55%	−0.90%
	Scattering	15	0.01%	
	Blank	6	0.00%	
Majority		56,645	25.45%	
Total votes		222,550	100.00%	
Republican hold				

==== Results by county ====
No votes were recorded in Keweenaw County.

County	John J. Bagley Republican		Austin Blair Liberal Republican		William M. Ferry Democratic		Henry Fish Prohibition		Margin		Total votes cast
County	#	%	#	%	#	%	#	%	#	%	Total votes cast
Alcona	166	91.71%	15	8.29%	0	0.00%	0	0.00%	151	83.43%	181
Allegan	3,484	66.00%	1,735	32.87%	59	1.12%	1	0.02%	1,749	33.13%	5,279
Alpena	514	62.23%	306	37.05%	4	0.48%	2	0.24%	208	25.18%	826
Antrim	282	78.33%	78	21.67%	0	0.00%	0	0.00%	204	56.67%	360
Allegan	2,674	66.85%	1,246	31.15%	43	1.08%	37	0.93%	1,428	35.70%	4,000
Bay	1,943	58.10%	1,341	40.10%	16	0.48%	44	1.32%	602	18.00%	3,344
Benzie	458	87.91%	57	10.94%	6	1.15%	0	0.00%	401	76.97%	521
Berrien	3,916	60.32%	2,483	38.25%	90	1.39%	0	0.00%	1,433	22.07%	6,492 (Note: Includes 3 Scattering votes)
Branch	3,489	72.87%	1,192	24.90%	64	1.34%	43	0.90%	2,297	47.97%	4,788
Calhoun	4,493	62.95%	2,426	33.99%	98	1.37%	118	1.65%	2,067	28.96%	7,137 (Note: Includes 2 Scattering votes)
Cass	2,444	55.80%	1,911	43.63%	24	0.55%	1	0.02%	533	12.17%	4,380
Charlevoix	266	95.34%	13	4.66%	0	0.00%	0	0.00%	253	90.68%	279
Cheboygan	236	55.66%	185	43.63%	3	0.71%	0	0.00%	51	12.03%	424
Chippewa	176	77.53%	51	22.47%	0	0.00%	0	0.00%	125	55.07%	227
Clare	216	65.65%	112	34.04%	1	0.30%	0	0.00%	104	31.61%	329
Clinton	2,496	57.23%	1,832	42.01%	10	0.23%	22	0.50%	664	15.23%	4,361 (Note: Includes 1 Scattering vote)
Delta	438	78.07%	123	21.93%	0	0.00%	0	0.00%	315	56.15%	561
Eaton	3,193	61.64%	1,758	33.94%	39	0.75%	190	3.67%	1,435	27.70%	5,180
Emmet	64	31.53%	139	68.47%	0	0.00%	0	0.00%	-75	-36.95%	203
Genesee	3,985	64.47%	2,091	33.83%	51	0.83%	54	0.87%	1,894	30.64%	6,181
Grand Traverse	703	81.37%	160	18.52%	1	0.12%	0	0.00%	543	62.85%	864
Gratiot	1,479	69.05%	650	30.35%	12	0.56%	1	0.05%	829	38.70%	2,142
Hillsdale	4,579	72.14%	1,613	25.41%	109	1.72%	46	0.72%	2,966	46.73%	6,347
Houghton (Note: Not included in official canvass)	1,866	66.74%	922	32.98%	8	0.29%	0	0.00%	944	33.76%	2,796
Huron	867	69.08%	386	30.76%	0	0.00%	2	0.16%	481	38.33%	1,255
Ingham	3,462	58.75%	2,353	39.93%	53	0.90%	25	0.42%	1,109	18.82%	5,893
Ionia	3,343	63.99%	1,803	34.51%	49	0.94%	29	0.56%	1,540	29.48%	5,224
Iosco	417	67.48%	195	31.55%	1	0.16%	5	0.81%	222	35.92%	618
Isabella	727	73.14%	264	26.56%	3	0.30%	0	0.00%	463	46.58%	994
Jackson	4,048	51.63%	3,602	45.94%	36	0.46%	154	1.96%	446	5.69%	7,840
Kalamazoo	4,014	60.79%	2,502	37.89%	76	1.15%	11	0.17%	1,512	22.90%	6,603
Kalkaska	103	100.00%	0	0.00%	0	0.00%	0	0.00%	103	100.00%	103
Kent	5,894	63.77%	3,236	35.01%	100	1.08%	13	0.14%	2,658	28.76%	9,243
Lake	225	91.84%	20	8.16%	0	0.00%	0	0.00%	205	83.67%	245
Lapeer	2,493	63.07%	1,444	36.53%	4	0.10%	12	0.30%	1,049	26.54%	3,953
Leelanau	502	72.13%	193	27.73%	0	0.00%	1	0.14%	309	44.40%	696
Lenawee	5,806	61.17%	3,499	36.87%	166	1.75%	20	0.21%	2,307	24.31%	9,491
Livingston	2,329	52.02%	2,044	45.66%	103	2.30%	1	0.02%	285	6.37%	4,477
Mackinac	74	41.81%	103	58.19%	0	0.00%	0	0.00%	-29	-16.38%	177
Macomb	2,465	50.31%	2,311	47.16%	54	1.10%	70	1.43%	154	3.14%	4,900
Manistee	783	63.35%	434	35.11%	8	0.65%	11	0.89%	349	28.24%	1,236
Manitou	64	85.33%	11	14.67%	0	0.00%	0	0.00%	53	70.67%	75
Marquette	1,857	70.05%	785	29.61%	9	0.34%	0	0.00%	1,072	40.44%	2,651
Mason	670	67.88%	291	29.48%	26	2.63%	0	0.00%	379	38.40%	987
Mecosta	1,102	75.22%	357	24.37%	2	0.14%	4	0.27%	745	50.85%	1,465
Menominee	436	78.00%	123	22.00%	0	0.00%	0	0.00%	313	55.99%	559
Midland	730	70.40%	269	25.94%	28	2.70%	10	0.96%	461	44.46%	1,037
Missaukee	111	89.52%	13	10.48%	0	0.00%	0	0.00%	98	79.03%	124
Monroe	2,669	53.54%	2,263	45.40%	50	1.00%	3	0.06%	406	8.14%	4,985
Montcalm	2,020	70.16%	852	29.59%	6	0.21%	1	0.03%	1,168	40.57%	2,879
Muskegon	1,747	70.10%	737	29.57%	6	0.24%	1	0.04%	1,010	40.53%	2,492
Newaygo	800	78.97%	191	18.85%	19	1.88%	3	0.30%	609	60.12%	1,013
Oakland	4,486	53.64%	3,605	43.11%	202	2.42%	70	0.84%	881	10.53%	8,363
Oceana	1,159	81.79%	225	15.88%	33	2.33%	0	0.00%	934	65.91%	1,417
Ontonagon	239	61.60%	149	38.40%	0	0.00%	0	0.00%	90	23.20%	388
Osceola	540	71.33%	176	23.25%	28	3.70%	13	1.72%	364	48.08%	757
Ottawa	2,550	64.46%	1,192	30.13%	207	5.23%	0	0.00%	1,358	34.33%	3,956 (Note: Includes 1 Scattering vote and 6 Blank votes)
Presque Isle	137	94.48%	8	5.52%	0	0.00%	0	0.00%	129	88.97%	145
Saginaw	3,705	56.30%	2,734	41.54%	134	2.04%	8	0.12%	971	14.75%	6,581
Sanilac	1,335	75.42%	411	23.22%	22	1.24%	1	0.06%	924	52.20%	1,770
Schoolcraft	277	94.54%	16	5.46%	0	0.00%	0	0.00%	261	89.08%	293
Shiawassee	2,801	62.08%	1,611	35.70%	72	1.60%	28	0.62%	1,190	26.37%	4,512
St. Clair	3,302	58.13%	2,283	40.19%	21	0.37%	74	1.30%	1,019	17.94%	5,680
St. Joseph	3,199	61.65%	1,922	37.04%	65	1.25%	3	0.06%	1,277	24.61%	5,189
Tuscola	1,829	72.26%	629	24.85%	45	1.78%	28	1.11%	1,200	47.41%	2,531
Van Buren	3,569	63.58%	1,872	33.35%	159	2.83%	13	0.23%	1,697	30.23%	5,613
Washtenaw	4,174	55.77%	3,197	42.72%	102	1.36%	10	0.13%	977	13.05%	7,484
Wayne	12,581	57.46%	9,050	41.33%	212	0.97%	48	0.22%	3,531	16.13%	21,896 (Note: Includes 5 Scattering votes)
Wexford	271	76.55%	83	23.45%	0	0.00%	0	0.00%	188	53.11%	354
Total	137,606	61.83%	80,961	36.38%	2,731	1.23%	1,231	0.55%	56,645	25.45%	222,550

===== Counties that flipped from Democratic to Republican =====
- Cheboygan
- Houghton
- Jackson
- Livingston
- Macomb
- Marquette
- Monroe
- Oakland
- Ontonagon
- Washtenaw
- Wayne
