= William B. Williams (Michigan politician) =

American judge and politician

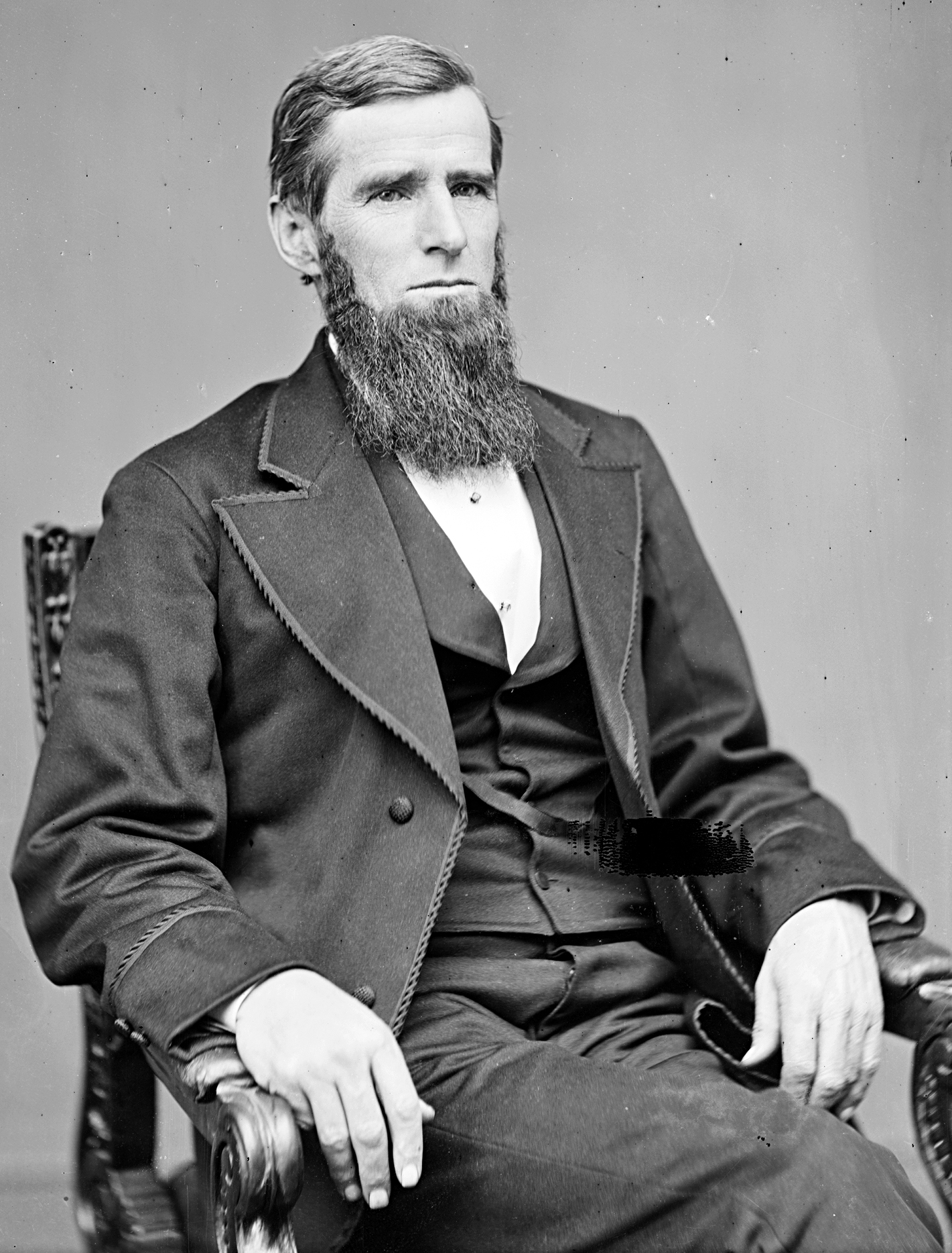

Member of the U.S. House of Representatives from Michigan's 5th district
- In office December 1, 1873 – March 3, 1877
- Preceded by: Wilder D. Foster
- Succeeded by: John W. Stone

Personal details
- Born: July 28, 1826 Pittsford, New York, U.S.
- Died: March 4, 1905 (aged 78) Allegan, Michigan, U.S.
- Party: Republican
- Education: State and National Law School

William Brewster Williams (July 28, 1826 – March 4, 1905) was a politician and judge from the U.S. State of Michigan.

Williams was born in Pittsford, New York. He attended the common schools, received an academic education, and graduated from the State and National Law School, Ballston Spa, New York in 1851. He was admitted to the bar the same year and commenced practice in Rochester, New York. He moved to Allegan, Michigan in 1855.

Williams was a probate court judge from 1857 to 1865 and a member of the Michigan Senate from 1866 to 1870, serving as president pro tempore in 1869. He was also a member of the State constitutional convention in 1867, and a Michigan delegate to 1868 Republican National Convention. In 1871, he was appointed by Governor Henry P. Baldwin to serve as a member of the State board for the supervisory control of the charitable, penal, and beneficiary institutions, which position he resigned upon his election to the U.S. Congress.

After the death of U.S. Representative Wilder D. Foster on September 20, 1873, Williams was elected November 4, 1873 as a Republican to fill the vacancy. Williams was elected to represent Michigan's 5th congressional district in the 43rd Congress, serving from December 1, 1873 to March 3, 1877. He was not a candidate for re-nomination in 1876.

William B. Williams served as railroad commissioner of Michigan from 1877 to 1883 and resumed the practice of law. He died in Allegan and is interred there in Oakwood Cemetery.

U.S. House of Representatives
Preceded by Wilder D. Foster	United States Representative for the 5th congressional district of Michigan; 1873 – 1877	Succeeded by John W. Stone
