= 1876 Michigan gubernatorial election =

- November 7, 1876
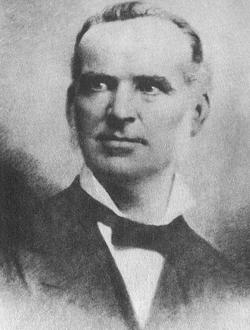

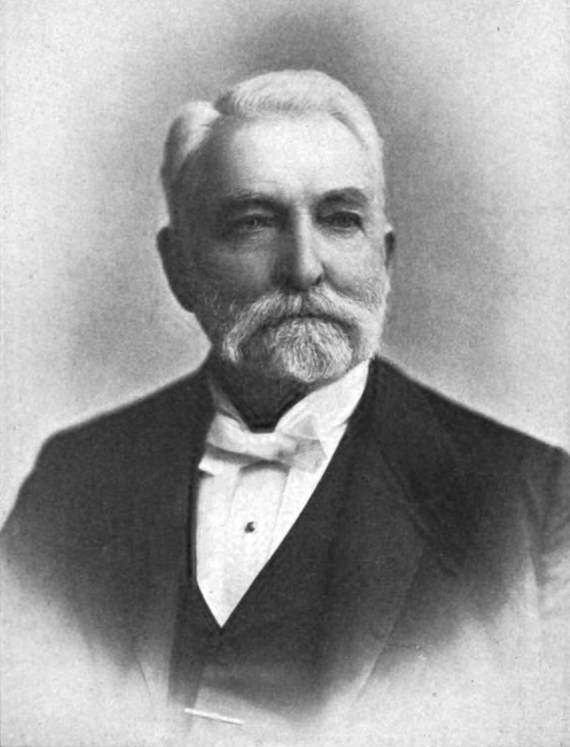
Nominee	Charles Croswell	William L. Webber
Party	Republican	Democratic
Popular vote	165,930	142,591
Percentage	52.19%	44.85%
- County results Croswell: 40–50% 50–60% 60–70% 70–80% 90–100% Webber: 50–60% 60–70% 70–80% No data/vote
Governor before election
John J. Bagley
Republican
Elected Governor
Charles Croswell
Republican

The 1876 Michigan gubernatorial election was held on November 7, 1876. Republican nominee Charles Croswell defeated Democratic nominee William L. Webber with 52.19% of the vote.

== General election ==
=== Candidates ===
Major party candidates

- Charles Croswell, Republican
- William L. Webber, Democratic

Other candidates

- Levi Sparks, Greenback
- Albert Williams, Prohibition

=== Results ===
1876 Michigan gubernatorial election (Note: Imperfect votes have been assigned to their respective intended candidates. Certified totals: Croswell 165,926; Webber 142,492; Sparks 8,297; Williams 870; Imperfect 173; Scattering 185; Blank 2.)
Party	Candidate	Votes	%	±%
Republican	Charles Croswell	165,926	52.19%	+1.72%
Democratic	William L. Webber	142,591	44.85%	−2.83%
Greenback	Levi Sparks	8,366	2.63%	
Prohibition	Albert Williams	871	0.27%	−1.53%
	Scattering	185	0.06%	
	Blank	2	0.00%	
Majority		23,339	7.34%	
Total votes		317,945	100.00%	
Republican hold		Swing	+4.54%	

==== Results by county ====
This was the only election in which Isle Royale County reported votes separately.

County	Charles Croswell Republican		William L. Webber Democratic		Levi Sparks Greenback		Thomas E. Carpenter Prohibition		Margin		Total votes cast
County	#	%	#	%	#	%	#	%	#	%	Total votes cast
Alcona	146	46.06%	171	53.94%	0	0.00%	0	0.00%	-25	-7.89%	317
Allegan	4,299	55.64%	3,181	41.17%	247	3.20%	0	0.00%	1,118	14.47%	7,727
Alpena	624	49.60%	634	50.40%	0	0.00%	0	0.00%	-10	-0.79%	1,258
Antrim	475	62.58%	283	37.29%	1	0.13%	0	0.00%	192	25.30%	759
Baraga	218	48.44%	232	51.56%	0	0.00%	0	0.00%	-14	-3.11%	450
Barry	2,941	53.59%	1,864	33.97%	673	12.26%	10	0.18%	1,077	19.62%	5,488
Bay	2,405	44.87%	2,859	53.34%	93	1.74%	3	0.06%	-454	-8.47%	5,360
Benzie	473	70.81%	191	28.59%	4	0.60%	0	0.00%	282	42.22%	668
Berrien	4,179	51.22%	3,683	45.14%	292	3.58%	0	0.00%	496	6.08%	8,159 (Note: Includes 5 Scattering votes)
Branch	4,007	58.55%	2,384	34.83%	446	6.52%	7	0.10%	1,623	23.71%	6,844
Calhoun	5,132	56.59%	2,3824	42.17%	78	0.86%	35	0.39%	1,308	14.42%	9,069
Cass	2,751	52.23%	2,354	44.69%	162	3.08%	0	0.00%	397	7.54%	5,267
Charlevoix	411	67.05%	202	32.95%	0	0.00%	0	0.00%	209	34.09%	613
Cheboygan	263	37.20%	444	62.80%	0	0.00%	0	0.00%	-181	-25.60%	707
Chippewa	172	37.80%	283	62.20%	0	0.00%	0	0.00%	-111	-24.40%	455
Clare	269	52.95%	239	47.05%	0	0.00%	0	0.00%	30	5.91%	508
Clinton	3,253	51.16%	3,074	48.35%	27	0.42%	4	0.06%	179	2.82%	6,358
Delta	507	53.03%	449	46.97%	0	0.00%	0	0.00%	58	6.07%	956
Eaton	3,982	56.40%	2,913	41.26%	42	0.59%	122	1.73%	1,069	15.14%	7,060 (Note: Includes 1 Scattering vote)
Emmet	311	41.69%	432	57.91%	3	0.40%	0	0.00%	-121	-16.22%	746
Genesee	5,031	57.12%	3,755	42.63%	6	0.07%	16	0.18%	1,276	14.49%	8,808
Gladwin	87	35.37%	159	64.63%	0	0.00%	0	0.00%	-72	-29.27%	246
Grand Traverse	1,005	75.28%	329	24.64%	0	0.00%	1	0.07%	676	50.64%	1,335
Gratiot	2,146	58.84%	1,370	37.57%	130	3.56%	1	0.03%	776	21.28%	3,647
Hillsdale	5,086	63.16%	2,342	29.08%	557	6.92%	68	0.84%	2,744	34.07%	8,053
Houghton	2,263	61.08%	1,442	38.92%	0	0.00%	0	0.00%	821	22.16%	3,705
Huron	1,273	54.89%	1,036	44.67%	0	0.00%	10	0.43%	237	10.22%	2,319
Ingham	4,044	49.98%	4,006	49.51%	8	0.10%	33	0.41%	38	0.47%	8,091
Ionia	4,286	55.96%	3,246	42.38%	61	0.80%	66	0.86%	1,040	13.58%	7,659
Iosco	469	56.03%	366	43.73%	0	0.00%	2	0.24%	103	12.31%	837
Isabella	1,025	56.82%	720	39.91%	28	1.55%	0	0.00%	305	16.91%	1,804 (Note: Includes 31 Scattering votes)
Isle Royale	12	21.82%	43	78.18%	0	0.00%	0	0.00%	-31	-56.36%	55
Jackson	4,845	47.10%	5,332	51.83%	24	0.23%	86	0.84%	-487	-4.73%	10,287
Kalamazoo	4,493	54.95%	3,595	43.97%	80	0.98%	8	0.10%	898	10.98%	8,176
Kalkaska	382	73.46%	128	24.62%	2	0.38%	0	0.00%	254	48.85%	520 (Note: Includes 8 Scattering votes)
Kent	7,402	48.60%	5,764	37.84%	2,062	13.54%	3	0.02%	1,638	10.75%	15,231
Keweenaw	736	64.06%	413	35.94%	0	0.00%	0	0.00%	323	28.11%	1,149
Lake	407	64.71%	213	33.86%	9	1.43%	0	0.00%	194	30.84%	629
Lapeer	3,216	56.13%	2,510	43.80%	1	0.02%	3	0.05%	706	12.32%	5,730
Leelanau	635	60.59%	413	39.41%	0	0.00%	0	0.00%	222	21.18%	1,048
Lenawee	6,556	53.31%	5,523	44.91%	6	0.05%	214	1.74%	1,033	8.40%	12,299
Livingston	2,728	47.97%	2,947	51.82%	0	0.00%	12	0.21%	-219	-3.85%	5,687
Mackinac	74	26.62%	204	73.38%	0	0.00%	0	0.00%	-130	-46.76%	278
Macomb	3,008	46.32%	3,467	53.39%	14	0.22%	4	0.06%	-459	-7.07%	6,494
Manistee	884	49.61%	820	46.02%	77	4.32%	1	0.06%	64	3.59%	1,782
Manitou	34	26.77%	93	73.23%	0	0.00%	0	0.00%	-59	-46.46%	127
Marquette	2,311	56.96%	1,746	43.04%	0	0.00%	0	0.00%	565	13.93%	4,057
Mason	926	55.92%	685	41.36%	45	2.72%	0	0.00%	241	14.55%	1,656
Mecosta	1,341	56.56%	945	39.86%	85	3.58%	0	0.00%	396	16.70%	2,371
Menominee	394	53.03%	349	46.97%	0	0.00%	0	0.00%	45	6.06%	743
Midland	663	58.21%	476	41.79%	0	0.00%	0	0.00%	187	16.42%	1,139
Missaukee	160	59.48%	109	40.52%	0	0.00%	0	0.00%	51	18.96%	269
Monroe	3,013	43.43%	3,918	56.47%	5	0.07%	1	0.01%	-905	-13.04%	6,938
Montcalm	3,099	55.02%	2,461	43.69%	66	1.17%	6	0.11%	638	11.33%	5,633
Muskegon	2,254	57.35%	1,514	38.52%	160	4.07%	2	0.05%	740	18.83%	3,930
Newaygo	1,304	55.97%	792	33.99%	226	9.70%	8	0.34%	512	21.97%	2,330
Oakland	5,028	48.11%	5,346	51.15%	41	0.39%	37	0.35%	-318	-3.04%	10,452
Oceana	1,368	68.74%	594	29.85%	28	1.41%	0	0.00%	774	38.89%	1,990
Ogemaw	101	53.72%	87	46.28%	0	0.00%	0	0.00%	14	7.45%	188
Ontonagon	203	38.52%	324	61.48%	0	0.00%	0	0.00%	-121	-22.96%	527
Osceola	793	54.84%	628	43.43%	23	1.59%	2	0.14%	165	11.41%	1,446
Otsego	184	55.93%	145	44.07%	0	0.00%	0	0.00%	39	11.85%	329
Ottawa	3,381	55.47%	2,652	43.51%	62	1.02%	0	0.00%	729	11.96%	6,095
Presque Isle	150	47.77%	164	52.23%	0	0.00%	0	0.00%	-14	-4.46%	314
Roscommon	54	22.69%	184	77.31%	0	0.00%	0	0.00%	-130	-54.62%	238
Saginaw	3,984	44.05%	5,052	55.86%	4	0.04%	4	0.04%	-1,068	-11.81%	9,044
Sanilac	1,910	63.41%	1,037	34.43%	64	2.12%	1	0.03%	873	28.98%	3,012
Schoolcraft	119	53.36%	104	46.64%	0	0.00%	0	0.00%	15	6.73%	223
Shiawassee	3,182	55.82%	2,485	43.60%	6	0.11%	27	0.47%	697	12.23%	5,700
St. Clair	4,058	51.37%	3,719	47.08%	112	1.42%	8	0.10%	339	4.29%	7,899 (Note: Includes 2 Blank votes)
St. Joseph	3,152	49.17%	2,489	38.83%	767	11.97%	0	0.00%	663	10.34%	6,410 (Note: Includes 2 Scattering votes)
Tuscola	2,423	62.26%	1,338	34.38%	0	0.00%	0	0.00%	1,085	27.88%	3,892 (Note: Includes 131 Scattering votes)
Van Buren	4,043	56.55%	2,596	36.31%	508	7.11%	2	0.03%	1,447	20.24%	7,149
Washtenaw	4,532	46.65%	5,150	53.02%	2	0.02%	30	0.31%	-618	-6.36%	9,714
Wayne	12,242	42.42%	15,570	53.95%	1,011	3.50%	33	0.11%	-3,328	-11.53%	28,860 (Note: Includes 4 Scattering votes)
Wexford	613	96.99%	0	0.00%	18	2.85%	1	0.16%	595 (Note: Croswell's margin over Sparks)	95.14%	632
Total	165,930	52.19%	142,591	44.85%	8,366	2.63%	871	0.27%	23,339	7.34%	317,945

===== Counties that flipped from Democratic to Republican =====
- Berrien
- Clinton
- Houghton
- Ingham
- Ionia
- Isabella
- Lenawee
- Manistee
- Marquette
- Mason
- Schoolcraft

===== Counties that flipped from Republican to Democratic =====
- Alcona
- Alpena
- Chippewa
- Manitou
- Presque Isle
