= Henry Chamberlain (Michigan politician) =

American politician (1824–1907)

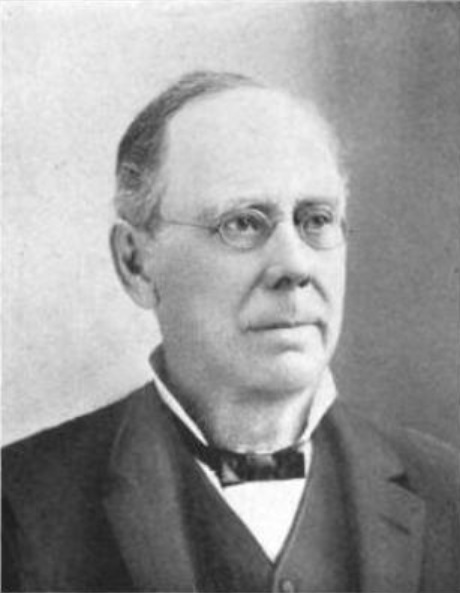

Member of the Michigan House of Representatives from the Berrien County district
- In office January 1, 1849 – April 2, 1849

Personal details
- Born: March 17, 1824 Pembroke, New Hampshire
- Died: February 9, 1907 (aged 82) Three Oaks, Michigan
- Party: Democratic
- Spouses: Sarah Jane Nash (m. 1851; d. 1852); Rebecca VanDevanter (m. 1856; d. 1896)

Henry Chamberlain (March 17, 1824 – February 9, 1907) was a Michigan politician.

== Early life ==
Henry Chamberlain was born on March 17, 1824, in Pembroke, New Hampshire, to parents Moses and Mary Chamberlain. Chamberlain attended school until about 1836. In 1836, the Chamberlain family moved to Three Oaks, Michigan.

== Career ==
In 1836, once in Three Oaks, Chamberlain started farming with his family. On November 6, 1848, Chamberlain was elected to the Michigan House of Representatives where he represented the Berrien County district from January 1, 1849, to April 2, 1849. In 1850, Chamberlain stated his own farm. In the 1874 Michigan gubernatorial election, Chamberlain was the Democratic nominee. In this election, Chamberlain was defeated by incumbent Republican governor John J. Bagley. In 1876 and 1896, Chamberlain was a delegate to Democratic National Convention from Michigan. In 1896, Chamberlain was an unsuccessful candidate for the position of presidential elector for Michigan.

== Personal life ==
Chamberlain married Sarah Jane Nash in 1851. Chamberlain was widowed by her death in 1852. Chamberlain got remarried to Rebecca VanDevanter in 1856. Chamberlain was again widowed by her death in 1896. Chamberlain and VanDevanter had three children together. Chamberlain was a member of the Freemasons from 1853 and onward. He served as Grand Master of the Masons in 1872. Henry Chamberlain had two brothers who were also politicians, William Chamberlain, who was a fellow member of the Michigan House of Representatives, and Mellen Chamberlain, who was a Massachusetts state legislator. Chamberlain was Congregationalist.

== Death ==
Chamberlain died on February 9, 1907, in Three Oaks. Chamberlain was interred at Forest Lawn Cemetery in Three Oaks.

Party political offices
Preceded by William Montague Ferry Jr.	Democratic nominee for Governor of Michigan; 1874	Succeeded by William L. Webber
