= William L. Webber =

American politician

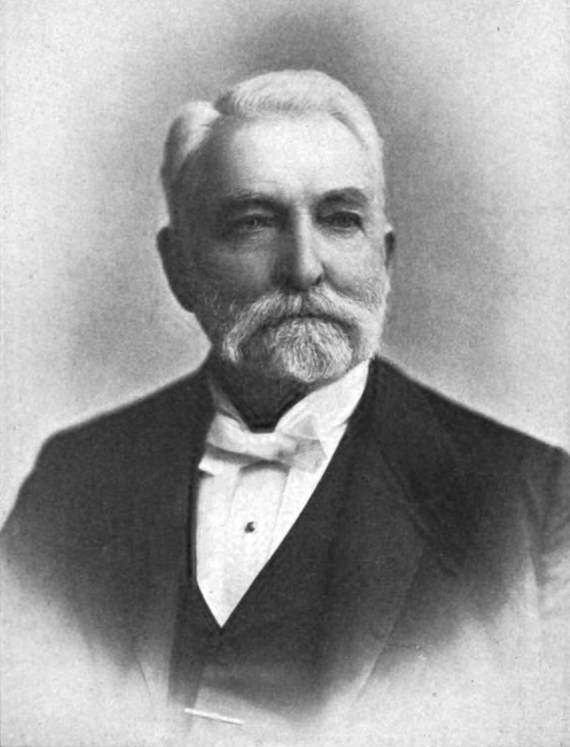

Member of the Michigan Senate from the 25th district
- In office January 1, 1875 – 1876
- Preceded by: Charles V. DeLand
- Succeeded by: Wesley P. Andrus

Mayor of East Saginaw
- In office 1873–1873
- Preceded by: Charles L. Ortman
- Succeeded by: Herbert H. Hoyt

Personal details
- Born: July 19, 1825 Ogden, New York, US
- Died: October 15, 1901 (aged 76) Saginaw, Michigan, US
- Party: Democratic
- Spouse: Nancy M. Whithington
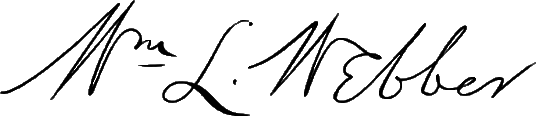
- Signature

William L. Webber (July 19, 1825 – October 15, 1901) was a Michigan politician.

== Early life ==
Webber was born in Ogden, New York on July 19, 1825 to parents James S. and Phebe Webber.

== Career ==
Webber held a number of local positions in Saginaw County, Michigan, including circuit court commissioner and prosecuting attorney. Webber served as the Mayor of East Saginaw in 1873. Webber was elected to the Michigan Senate on November 6, 1874, where he represented the 25th district. He served in this position until 1876. Webber was delegation chair from Michigan during the 1876 Democratic National Convention. Webber was the Democratic nominee in the 1876 Michigan gubernatorial election, but was defeated by Charles Croswell.

== Personal life ==
Webber was married to Nancy M. Whithington. Webber was a member of the Royal Arch Masons, the Odd Fellows, the Knights Templar, and was a Freemason.

== Death ==
Webber died in Saginaw on October 15, 1901.

Party political offices
Preceded by Henry Chamberlain	Democratic nominee for Governor of Michigan; 1876	Succeeded by Orlando M. Barnes
