= Charles C. Comstock =

American politician

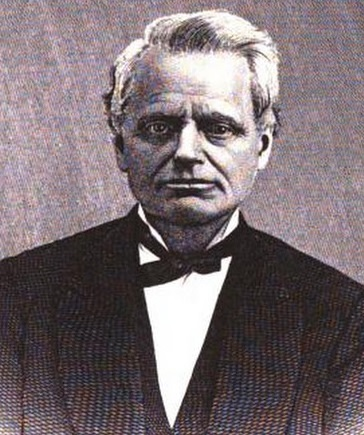
- From 1891's History of the City of Grand Rapids, Michigan

Member of the U.S. House of Representatives from Michigan's 5th district
- In office March 4, 1885 – March 3, 1887
- Preceded by: Julius Houseman
- Succeeded by: Melbourne H. Ford

Personal details
- Born: March 5, 1818 Sullivan, New Hampshire, U.S.
- Died: February 20, 1900 (aged 81) Grand Rapids, Michigan, U.S.
- Party: Democratic
- Spouses: Mary Winchester (m. 1840; died 1863) Cornelia Guild Davis (m. 1865, ?)
- Children: 6

Charles Carter Comstock (March 5, 1818 – February 20, 1900) was a businessman and politician from the US state of Michigan.

== Family and early life ==
Comstock was born in Sullivan, New Hampshire, the son of William and Ruth Crane Comstock. He was educated in the common schools and lived on the family farm in New Hampshire until he went into the lumber business at age 24. In 1853 he moved with his family to Grand Rapids, Michigan and continued in the lumber business, soon expanding into manufacturing wood products. With E. T. Ward & Co. he brought the first machinery to the city for the manufacture of sash, doors and blinds. In 1857, he bought the Winchester furniture factory. The Panic of 1857 nearly drove him out of business, but he persevered through the difficulties and within about four years he had satisfied all financial obligations and had put his enterprises on a sound basis.

In 1863, he sold a half interest in the business to James M. and Ezra T. Nelson, forming the Comstock, Nelson & Company. In 1865, after Comstock sold his interest to his son, Tileston A. Comstock and others, it became the Nelson, Comstock & Company. In the fall of 1863, Comstock formed a partnership with E.E. Bolles for the manufacture of pails and tubs. In the following year, he purchased his partner's interest and continued the business until 1883. He built a large factory on Canal and Newberry streets and employed more than a 200 persons and using about 10,000,000 feet of timber annually. His three saw mills and lumber camps employed over 150 men. In 1872, Comstock organized the Grand Rapids Chair Company, and continued as its largest shareholder until his death.

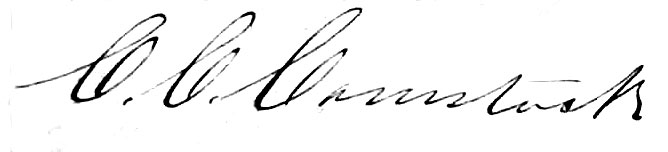
Charles C. Comstock's signature

In 1840, Comstock married Mary Winchester, who died in 1863. They had four children. Their only son, Tileston, died in 1870. The eldest daughter, Alzina, with her husband Albert A. Stone and their young son, were lost in the wreck of the steamer Brother Jonathan off the coast of California in July 1865. The other daughters are Julia C. Goldsmith and Mary Konkle.

In 1865, Comstock married Cornelia Guild Davis, the daughter of Daniel Guild, one of the pioneers of the Grand River Valley. They had two daughters, Etta (Mrs. Lucius Boltwood) and Clara (Mrs. Huntley Russell) (1866–1935). Clara Comstock Russell (http://www.historygrandrapids.org/photoessay/4480/clara-comstock-russell-woman-a) was chairman of the Republican Women's State Executive Committee, and vice-president of the Michigan Equal Suffrage Association. She married Huntley Russell (1858–1928), a Republican State Senator, State Land Commissioner and real estate developer.

== Political career ==
He was the Mayor of Grand Rapids in 1863 and 1864. He was the Democratic candidate for Governor of Michigan in 1870, losing to Republican Henry P. Baldwin. He also ran unsuccessfully as a Democrat for a seat in the United States House of Representatives in a special election in 1873. He was also a candidate for Congress with the Greenback Party in 1878.

In 1884, he was elected on a fusion ticket of Democrat and Greenback parties from Michigan's 5th congressional district to the 49th United States Congress, serving from March 4, 1885, to March 3, 1887. He was not a candidate for re-election in 1886.

He died in Grand Rapids and is buried there in the Fulton Street Cemetery.

Party political offices
Preceded by John Moore	Democratic nominee for Governor of Michigan; 1870	Succeeded by William Montague Ferry Jr.
Political offices
Preceded by George H. White	Mayor of Grand Rapids, Michigan; 1863–1864	Succeeded by Wilder D. Foster

U.S. House of Representatives
Preceded by Julius Houseman	United States Representative for the 5th congressional district of Michigan; 1885–1887	Succeeded by Melbourne H. Ford
