= John W. Stone =

American judge (1838–1922)

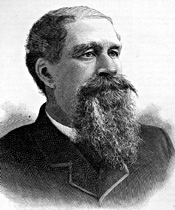

Member of the U.S. House of Representatives from Michigan's 5th district
- In office March 4, 1877 – March 3, 1881
- Preceded by: William B. Williams
- Succeeded by: George W. Webber

Personal details
- Born: July 18, 1838 Wadsworth, Ohio, U.S.
- Died: March 24, 1922 (aged 83) Lansing, Michigan, U.S.
- Party: Republican

John Wesley Stone (July 18, 1838 – March 24, 1922) was a politician and judge from the U.S. state of Michigan.

Stone was born in Wadsworth, Ohio, and attended the public schools and Spencer Academy in Spencer, Ohio. He moved to Allegan County, Michigan, in 1856 and was elected county clerk in 1860. He studied law and was admitted to the bar in January 1862 and was reelected county clerk the same year. He served as prosecuting attorney from 1864 to 1870 and village president of Allegan in 1872. He also served as circuit judge of the twentieth judicial circuit of Michigan from April 1873 until his resignation on November 1, 1874. He then moved to Grand Rapids where he practiced law.

Stone was elected as a Republican from Michigan's 5th congressional district to the 45th and 46th Congresses, serving from March 4, 1877, to March 3, 1881. He was not a candidate for re-nomination in 1880.

Stone was appointed by U.S. President Chester A. Arthur as United States Attorney of the District Court for the Western District of Michigan in 1882, serving until 1886. He moved to Houghton, Michigan, in 1887 and resumed the practice of law. He was elected circuit judge of the twenty-fifth Michigan circuit in April 1890 and served until December 31, 1909. He was elected justice of the Michigan Supreme Court in April 1909 for the term ending December 31, 1917. He was reelected in 1916 and served until his death in Lansing, Michigan, on in March 1922. Stone is interred in Park Cemetery, Marquette, Michigan.

U.S. House of Representatives
Preceded by William B. Williams	United States Representative for the 5th congressional district of Michigan; 1877–1881	Succeeded by George W. Webber
