= William T. Powers (industrialist) =

American businessman and politician

William Powers

Mayor of Grand Rapids
- In office 1857
- Preceded by: John M. Fox
- Succeeded by: Gilbert M. McCray

Personal details
- Born: William Thompson Powers; July 8, 1820 Bristol, New Hampshire, U.S.
- Died: June 19, 1909 (aged 88) Grand Rapids, Michigan, U.S.
- Party: Democratic
- Spouse: Louisa Hall
- Children: 6

William Thompson Powers (July 8, 1820 – June 19, 1909) was an American businessman, politician, and manufacturer.

== Early life and education ==
Powers was born in Bristol, New Hampshire on July 8, 1820. His parents, Jonathan and Anna (Kendall) Powers, were natives of Groton and Hebron, New Hampshire. In 1826, the family moved to Lansingburgh, New York, where he was educated in public schools. When he was 18, learned the trade of cabinet maker. He early showed aptness and skill at machine work, a faculty which ever after proved useful and profitable to him.

== Career ==
In June 1847, Powers and his family, then consisting of his wife and one child, William Henry, came to Grand Rapids following after "uncle" John Ball. His chief business capital at the time was a good trade, about $300, in cash, a pair of willing hands and a spirit of energy and determination. Here he began work in a small shop at the southeast corner of Fountain and Ionia streets, where he rented bench room. Soon afterward he secured better quarters by the east bank of the river above Bridge Street and began working by machinery, using water power; making furniture of nearly all kinds then produced, and chairs, not only for the home trade, but for exportation, and having a salesroom near the foot of Canal Street. In 1850 he formed a partnership with Ebenezer Morris Ball, under the firm name of Powers & Ball, in the furniture trade, their business place being near where is the south entrance to the Arcade.

In 1852 they built a sawmill to which they added a larger structure for a factory, on Erie Street, where the business grew rapidly; soon giving work to some forty employees, and establishing an export trade in ready made stock for chairs, furniture and McCormick reapers. In January, 1855, this partnership was dissolved, and Mr. Powers turned his attention to lumbering, operating a steam mill with a circular saw, the first of its kind in this part of the state, which the firm had built above Leonard Street on the west bank of the river. About the same time he constructed a machine with a gang of circular saws for slitting thick plank into siding and flooring. He added furniture making to his business, and for a time before the Civil War had an extensive sales room on Canal Street, near Erie.

In 1865 and 1866 he purchased the river frontage necessary and in the three following years constructed the West Side Water Power Canal, a description of which is given in Baxter's History of Grand Rapids, Michigan. Powers erected over thirty structure in Grand Rapids for houses, mills, stores, factories and other purposes. Most prominent among these is Powers’ Grand Opera House. Notable in his work, also, is the Arcade artesian well, where so many thousands daily partake of its refreshing waters, free — a public benefaction.

=== Pioneering of Hydropower ===
In 1880 he caused the organizing of an electric lighting plant and company to Grand Rapids, Michigan, the first city lighting by electricity in Michigan. The works were operated chiefly by water power. The first industrial use of hydropower in the United States to generate electricity occurred in 1880, when 16 brush-arc lamps were powered using a water turbine at the Wolverine Chair and Furniture Factory; operated by William H. Powers, his son. In 1885, William T. Powers & Son purchased and moved their operation to the Michigan Iron Works. He served as president of the Electric Light and Power Company for many years, later known as Consumers Electric Light and Power, which has become a part of Consumers Energy.

Besides Powers' enterprises in Grand Rapids, he was engaged in the development of properties in and near Spearfish, South Dakota in the Black Hills region, where he had a water power of some 300 to 400 horse power, some manufacturing buildings, and about 400 acres of land. While in Spearfish he had a saw mill, furniture factory, door and sash company, plaster mine, and mercantile store.

=== Politics ===
He exhibited great interest in the material growth and advancement of Grand Rapids. He was chosen City Treasurer in 1853 and again in 1854, serving two terms. In 1857, he was elected Mayor and served one term, during which he started and gave a lasting impetus to the system of street improvements that has been so prominent a factor in city development and progress.

Powers was a member of the Democratic Party.

== Personal life ==
In 1839, Powers married Louisa Hall, a native of London, England. The couple had six children. Powers died in Grand Rapids, Michigan on June 19, 1909.
