= 1868 Michigan gubernatorial election =

- November 3, 1868
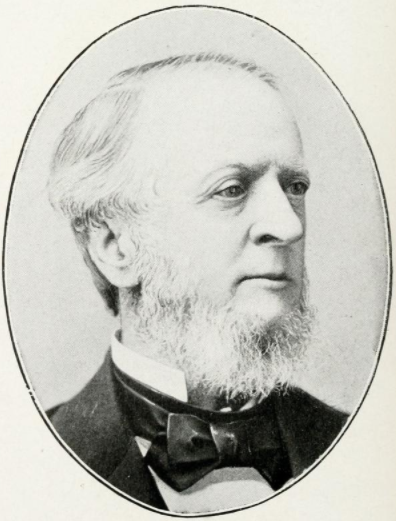

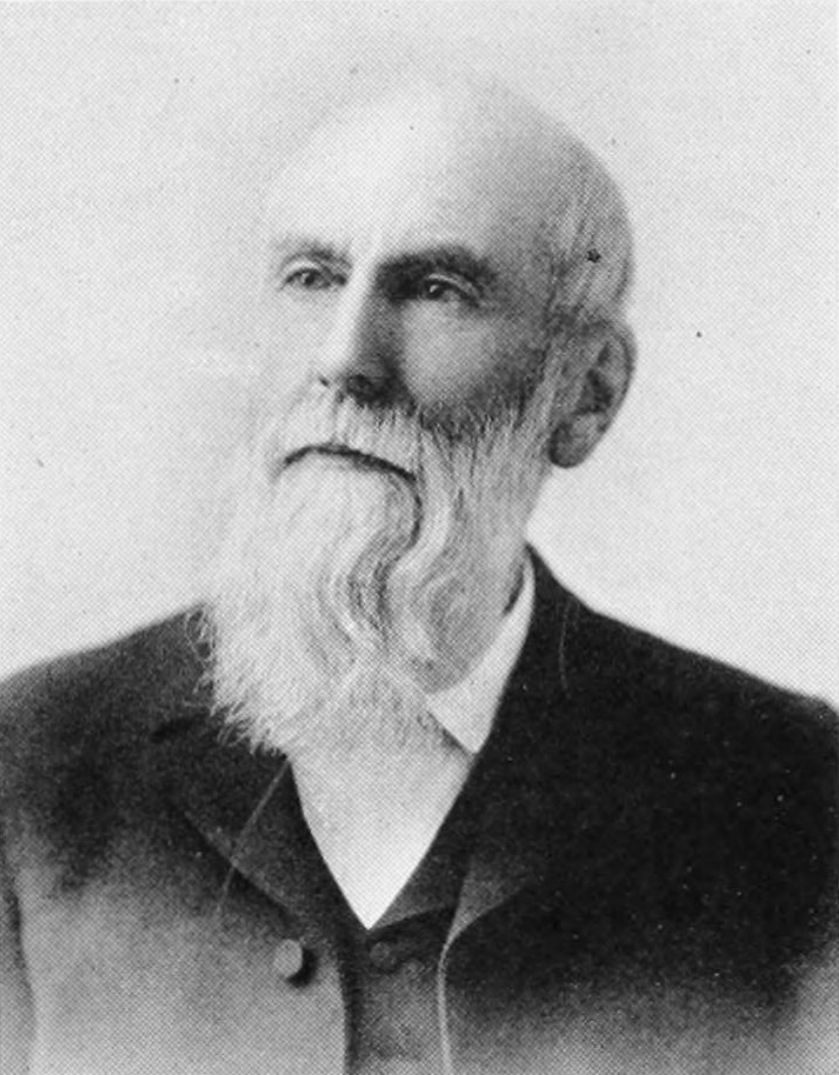
Nominee	Henry P. Baldwin	John Moore
Party	Republican	Democratic
Popular vote	128,051	97,290
Percentage	56.65%	43.04%
- County results Baldwin: 50–60% 60–70% 70–80% 80–90% Moore: 50–60% 60–70% 70–80% No data/vote
Governor before election
Henry H. Crapo
Republican
Elected Governor
Henry P. Baldwin
Republican

The 1868 Michigan gubernatorial election was held on November 3, 1868. Republican nominee Henry P. Baldwin defeated Democratic nominee John Moore with 56.65% of the vote.

== General election ==
=== Candidates ===
Major party candidates

- Henry P. Baldwin, Republican
- John Moore, Democratic

=== Results ===
1868 Michigan gubernatorial election
Party	Candidate	Votes	%	±%
Republican	Henry P. Baldwin	128,051	56.65%	−2.17%
Democratic	John Moore	97,290	43.04%	+1.88%
Labor Union	William H. Stewart	690	0.31%	
	Scattering	12	0.01%	
	Imperfect (Note: These are ballots that were intended for the main candidates but contained misspellings. The canvass does not list specific variations, it just groups these votes together.)	3	0.00%	
Majority		30,761	13.61%	
Total votes		226,046	100.00%	
Republican hold		Swing	-4.04%	

==== Results by county ====
No votes were recorded in Chippewa County. This was one of only two gubernatorial elections in which Manitou County voted Republican. (Note: The other was in 1872.)

County	Henry P. Baldwin Republican		John Moore Democratic		Margin		Total votes cast
County	#	%	#	%	#	%	Total votes cast
Allegan	3,556	60.07%	2,364	39.93%	1,192	20.14%	5,920
Alpena	325	58.66%	229	41.34%	96	17.33%	554
Antrim	237	84.64%	43	15.36%	194	69.29%	280
Allegan	2,916	65.03%	1,568	34.97%	1,348	30.06%	4,484
Bay	1,157	51.29%	1,098	48.67%	59	2.62%	2,256 (Note: Includes 1 imperfect vote)
Berrien	3,996	54.88%	3,285	45.12%	711	9.77%	7,281
Branch	3,970	66.10%	2,033	33.85%	1,937	32.25%	6,006 (Note: Includes 3 scattering votes)
Calhoun	5,041	61.00%	3,223	39.00%	1,818	22.00%	8,264
Cass	2,460	55.92%	1,939	44.08%	521	11.84%	4,399
Cheboygan	56	26.67%	154	73.33%	-98	-46.67%	210
Clinton	2,540	53.51%	1,839	38.74%	701	14.77%	4,747 (Note: Includes 368 votes for William H. Stewart)
Delta	157	49.22%	162	50.78%	-5	-1.57%	319
Eaton	3,083	60.02%	2,054	39.98%	1,029	20.03%	5,137
Emmet	135	40.30%	200	59.70%	-65	-19.40%	335
Genesee	4,209	60.69%	2,726	39.31%	1,483	21.38%	6,935
Grand Traverse	987	85.23%	171	14.77%	816	70.47%	1,158
Gratiot	1,236	61.86%	762	38.14%	474	23.72%	1,998
Hillsdale	4,889	69.65%	2,127	30.30%	2,762	39.35%	7,019
Houghton	715	38.13%	1,160	61.87%	-445	-23.73%	1,875
Huron	699	59.44%	477	40.56%	222	18.88%	1,176
Ingham	2,988	54.05%	2,540	45.95%	448	8.10%	5,528
Ionia	3,450	60.45%	1,961	34.36%	1,489	26.09%	5,707 (Note: Includes 296 votes for William H. Stewart)
Iosco	278	60.43%	182	39.57%	96	20.87%	460
Isabella	521	58.47%	370	41.53%	151	16.95%	891
Jackson	4,025	52.40%	3,656	47.60%	369	4.80%	7,681
Kalamazoo	4,062	57.76%	2,970	42.24%	1,092	15.53%	7,032
Kent	5,392	58.29%	3,834	41.44%	1,558	16.84%	9,251 (Note: Includes 25 votes for William H. Stewart)
Keweenaw	377	47.78%	412	52.22%	-35	-4.44%	789
Lapeer	2,371	58.80%	1,661	41.20%	710	17.61%	4,032
Leelanau	434	66.36%	220	33.64%	214	32.72%	654
Lenawee	6,189	57.03%	4,662	42.96%	1,527	14.07%	10,852 (Note: Includes 1 scattering vote)
Livingston	2,235	48.02%	2,419	51.98%	-184	-3.95%	4,654
Mackinac	43	26.54%	119	73.46%	-76	-46.91%	162
Macomb	2,795	51.04%	2,681	48.96%	114	2.08%	5,476
Manistee	654	70.02%	280	29.98%	374	40.04%	934
Manitou	43	100.00%	0	0.00%	43	100.00%	43
Marquette	804	53.07%	711	46.93%	93	6.14%	1,515
Mason	400	62.11%	244	37.89%	156	24.22%	644
Mecosta	768	68.02%	361	31.98%	407	36.05%	1,129
Menominee	122	63.54%	67	34.90%	55	28.65%	192
Midland	404	64.43%	223	35.57%	181	28.87%	627
Monroe	2,526	46.32%	2,927	53.68%	-401	-7.35%	5,453
Montcalm	1,511	64.05%	848	35.95%	663	28.11%	2,359
Muskegon	1,422	64.52%	782	35.48%	640	29.04%	2,204
Newaygo	903	68.56%	414	31.44%	489	37.13%	1,317
Oakland	4,719	51.28%	4,483	48.72%	236	2.56%	9,202
Oceana	1,079	72.37%	412	27.63%	667	44.74%	1,491
Ontonagon	229	43.29%	300	56.71%	-71	-13.42%	529
Ottawa	2,421	56.26%	1,880	43.69%	541	12.57%	4,303 (Note: Includes 2 scattering votes)
Saginaw	3,254	54.03%	2,767	45.94%	487	8.09%	6,023 (Note: Includes 2 imperfect votes)
Sanilac	1,306	69.91%	562	30.09%	744	39.83%	1,868
Shiawassee	2,395	56.98%	1,807	42.99%	588	13.99%	4,203 (Note: Includes 1 vote for William H. Stewart)
St. Clair	3,055	52.96%	2,713	47.04%	342	5.93%	5,768
St. Joseph	3,560	58.67%	2,508	41.33%	1,052	17.34%	6,068
Tuscola	1,616	71.25%	652	28.75%	964	42.50%	2,268
Van Buren	3,659	61.70%	2,271	38.30%	1,388	23.41%	5,930
Washtenaw	4,449	49.55%	4,529	50.45%	-80	-0.89%	8,978
Wayne	9,228	47.38%	10,248	52.62%	-1,020	-5.24%	19,476
Total	128,501	56.65%	97,290	43.04%	30,761	13.61%	226,046

===== Counties that flipped from Democratic to Republican =====
- Alpena
- Bay
- Manitou
- Marquette

===== Counties that flipped from Republican to Democratic =====
- Keweenaw
- Monroe
- Washtenaw
