= 1870 Michigan gubernatorial election =

- November 8, 1870
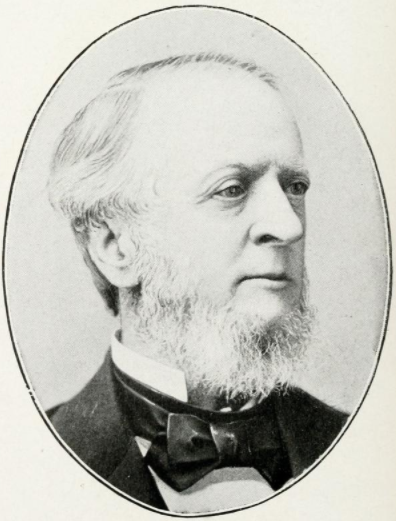

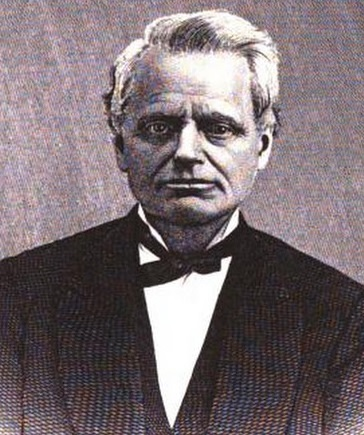
Nominee	Henry P. Baldwin	Charles C. Comstock
Party	Republican	Democratic
Popular vote	100,176	83,555
Percentage	53.71%	44.80%
- County results Baldwin: 50–60% 60–70% 70–80% 80–90% 90–100% Comstock: 50–60% 70–80% No data/vote
Governor before election
Henry P. Baldwin
Republican
Elected Governor
Henry P. Baldwin
Republican

The 1870 Michigan gubernatorial election was held on November 1, 1870. Incumbent Republican Henry P. Baldwin defeated Democratic nominee Charles C. Comstock with 53.71% of the vote.

== General election ==
=== Candidates ===
- Henry P. Baldwin, incumbent governor (Republican)
- Charles C. Comstock, lumber businessman and former mayor of Grand Rapids (Democratic)
- Henry Fish (Prohibition)

=== Results ===
1870 Michigan gubernatorial election
Party	Candidate	Votes	%	±%
Republican	Henry P. Baldwin (inc.)	100,176	53.71%	−2.94%
Democratic	Charles C. Comstock	83,555 (Note: Includes 164 votes in Cheboygan County that were listed separately under "imperfect". Every other candidate on the Democratic ticket received 164 votes in Cheboygan County.)	44.80%	+1.76%
Prohibition	Henry Fish	2,710	1.45%	
	Imperfect (Note: These are ballots that were intended for the main candidates but contained misspellings. The canvass does not list specific variations, it just groups these votes together.)	35	0.02%	
	Scattering	31	0.02%	
Majority		16,621	8.91%	
Total votes		186,507	100.00%	
Republican hold		Swing	-4.61%	

==== Results by county ====
No votes were recorded in Manitou County.

County	Henry P. Baldwin Republican		Charles C. Comstock Democratic		Henry Fish Prohibition		Margin		Total votes cast
County	#	%	#	%	#	%	#	%	Total votes cast
Alcona	111	59.04%	77	40.96%	0	0.00%	34	18.09%	188
Allegan	2,610	55.97%	2,038	43.71%	15	0.32%	572	12.27%	4,663
Alpena	365	61.86%	225	38.14%	0	0.00%	140	23.73%	590
Antrim	145	81.92%	32	18.08%	0	0.00%	113	63.84%	177
Allegan	1,983	57.97%	1,260	36.83%	178	5.20%	723	21.13%	3,421
Bay	1,186	51.54%	1,101	47.85%	14	0.61%	85	3.69%	2,301
Benzie	305	94.43%	18	5.57%	0	0.00%	287	88.85%	323
Berrien	3,114	51.31%	2,918	48.08%	35	0.58%	196	3.23%	6,069 (Note: Includes 2 Scattering votes)
Branch	2,613	64.00%	1,367	33.48%	96	2.35%	1,246	30.52%	4,083 (Note: Includes 7 imperfect votes)
Calhoun	3,339	57.67%	2,319	40.05%	132	2.28%	1,020	17.62%	5,790
Cass	1,819	52.51%	1,602	46.25%	40	1.15%	217	6.26%	3,464 (Note: Includes 2 imperfect votes and 1 scattering vote)
Charlevoix	81	65.85%	42	34.15%	0	0.00%	39	31.71%	123
Cheboygan	148	47.44%	164 (Note: These votes were listed separately under "imperfect". However, every other candidate on the Democratic ticket received 164 votes in this county so it can be assumed these votes were intended for Comstock.)	52.56%	0	0.00%	-16	-5.13%	312
Chippewa	115	80.99%	27	19.01%	0	0.00%	88	61.97%	142
Clinton	2,164	52.03%	1,921	46.19%	74	1.78%	243	5.84%	4,159
Delta	296	58.73%	207	41.07%	0	0.00%	89	17.66%	504 (Note: Includes 1 scattering vote)
Eaton	2,285	54.06%	1,691	40.00%	251	5.94%	594	14.05%	4,227
Emmet	54	27.55%	142	72.45%	0	0.00%	-88	-44.90%	196
Genesee	3,469	60.02%	2,276	39.38%	33	0.57%	1,193	20.64%	5,780
Grand Traverse	450	86.04%	70	13.38%	0	0.00%	380	72.66%	523 (Note: Includes 3 scattering votes)
Gratiot	1,080	58.03%	764	41.05%	17	0.91%	316	16.98%	1,861
Hillsdale	3,541	61.86%	2,031	35.48%	152	2.66%	1,510	26.38%	5,724
Houghton (Note: Not included in official canvass)	855	46.80%	972	53.20%	0	0.00%	-117	-6.40%	1,827
Huron	511	57.61%	369	41.60%	7	0.79%	142	16.01%	887
Ingham	2,864	52.77%	2,483	45.75%	80	1.47%	381	7.02%	5,427
Ionia	2,345	52.73%	1,883	42.34%	219	4.92%	462	10.39%	4,447
Iosco	276	54.76%	223	44.25%	5	0.99%	53	10.52%	504
Isabella	411	57.48%	304	42.52%	0	0.00%	107	14.97%	715
Jackson	3,340	48.59%	3,397	49.42%	137	1.99%	-57	-0.83%	6,874
Kalamazoo	2,864	59.14%	1,969	40.66%	0	0.00%	895	18.48%	4,843 (Note: Includes 10 scattering votes)
Kent	3,841	51.13%	3,616	48.14%	49	0.65%	225	3.00%	7,512 (Note: Includes 6 scattering votes)
Keweenaw	294	45.30%	355	54.70%	0	0.00%	-61	-9.40%	649
Lapeer	2,021	56.11%	1,557	43.23%	24	0.67%	464	12.88%	3,602
Leelanau	286	97.61%	7	2.39%	0	0.00%	279	95.22%	293
Lenawee	4,637	53.46%	3,855	44.44%	179	2.06%	782	9.02%	8,674
Livingston	2,047	46.78%	2,323	53.09%	6	0.14%	-276	-6.31%	4,376
Mackinac	53	30.99%	118	69.01%	0	0.00%	-65	-38.01%	171
Macomb	2,382	47.70%	2,574	51.54%	38	0.76%	-192	-3.84%	4,994
Manistee	493	65.65%	258	34.35%	0	0.00%	235	31.29%	751
Marquette	746	43.75%	959	56.25%	0	0.00%	-213	-12.49%	1,705
Mason	358	67.67%	170	32.14%	1	0.19%	188	35.54%	529
Mecosta	538	69.06%	241	30.94%	0	0.00%	297	38.13%	779
Menominee	186	69.92%	80	30.08%	0	0.00%	106	39.85%	266
Midland	391	61.29%	223	34.95%	24	3.76%	168	26.33%	638
Monroe	1,934	46.39%	2,195	52.65%	40	0.96%	-261	-6.26%	4,169
Montcalm	993	63.65%	567	36.35%	0	0.00%	426	27.31%	1,560
Muskegon	846	63.61%	484	36.39%	0	0.00%	362	27.22%	1,330
Newaygo	421	71.24%	155	26.23%	5	0.85%	266	45.01%	591 (Note: Includes 10 imperfect votes)
Oakland	3,837	46.08%	4,363	52.40%	127	1.53%	-526	-6.32%	8,327
Oceana	845	76.13%	261	23.51%	0	0.00%	584	52.61%	1,110 (Note: Includes 4 imperfect votes)
Ontonagon	166	43.57%	215	56.43%	0	0.00%	-49	-12.86%	381
Osceola	163	67.63%	71	29.46%	0	0.00%	92	38.17%	241
Ottawa	1,918	54.96%	1,564	44.81%	4	0.11%	354	10.14%	3,490
Saginaw	2,882	53.53%	2,491	46.27%	11	0.20%	391	7.26%	5,384
Sanilac	968	65.27%	455	30.68%	60	4.05%	513	34.59%	1,483
Shiawassee	2,098	53.41%	1,724	43.89%	106	2.70%	374	9.52%	3,928
St. Clair	2,495	50.87%	2,216	45.18%	193	3.93%	279	5.69%	4,905 (Note: Includes 1 imperfect vote)
St. Joseph	2,433	52.65%	2,076	44.93%	112	2.42%	357	7.73%	4,621
Tuscola	1,415	67.96%	667	32.04%	0	0.00%	748	35.93%	2,082
Van Buren	2,360	53.02%	1,908	42.87%	183	4.11%	452	10.16%	4,451
Washtenaw	3,570	48.38%	3,789	51.35%	17	0.23%	-219	-2.97%	7,379
Wayne	8,568	48.10%	9,198	51.64%	46	0.26%	-630	-3.54%	17,812
Wexford	160	89.89%	18	10.11%	0	0.00%	142	79.78%	178
Total	100,176	53.71%	83,555	44.80%	2,710	1.45%	16,621	8.91%	186,507

===== Counties that flipped from Democratic to Republican =====
- Chippewa
- Delta

===== Counties that flipped from Republican to Democratic =====
- Jackson
- Macomb
- Marquette
- Oakland
