= Orlando M. Barnes =

American lawyer and politician

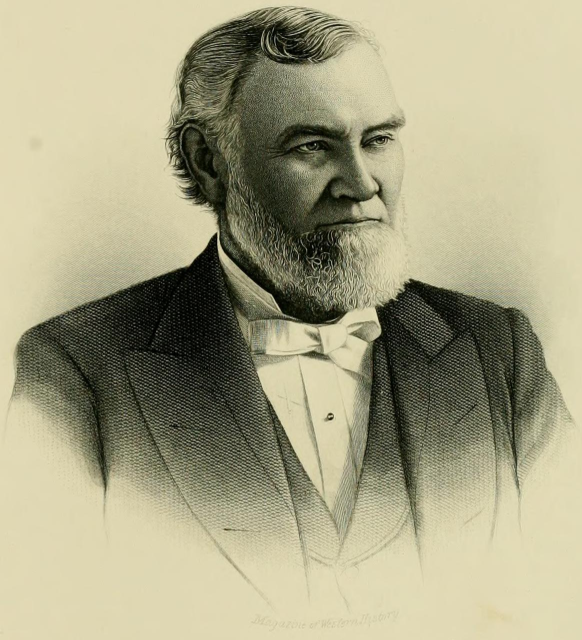
Orlando M. Barnes

Orlando Mack Barnes (November 21, 1824 – November 11, 1899) was an American lawyer and politician.

== Biography ==
Barnes's grave at Mount Hope Cemetery

Born in Cato, Cayuga County, New York, Barnes moved with his parents to Aurelius, Ingham County, Michigan, in 1837. Barnes went to the local schools and then graduated from University of Michigan. He studied law at the University of Michigan and was admitted to the Michigan bar. Barnes practiced law and then was involved with the railroad business. He served as prosecuting attorney for Ingham County. In 1862 and 1863, Barnes served in the Michigan House of Representatives and was a Democrat. In 1877, Barnes served as Mayor of Lansing, Michigan. His son Orlando F. Barnes also served as mayor of Lansing, Michigan. Barnes died in Lansing, Michigan, and was buried at Mount Hope Cemetery.

== Notes ==
Party political offices
Preceded by William L. Webber	Democratic nominee for Governor of Michigan; 1878	Succeeded by Frederick M. Holloway
