= Wilder D. Foster =

American politician

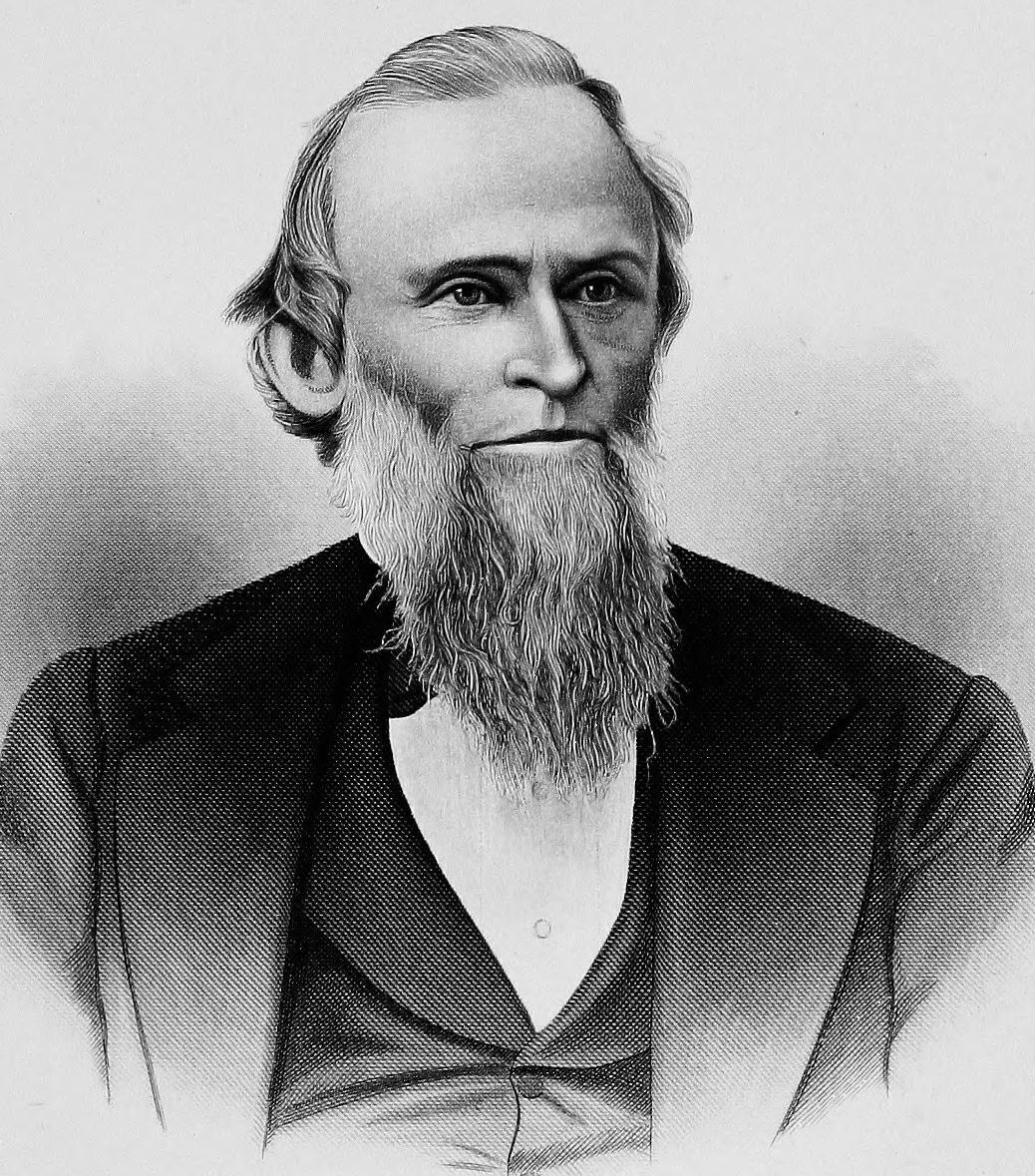
- From 1891's History of the City of Grand Rapids

Member of the U.S. House of Representatives from Michigan
- In office December 4, 1871 – September 20, 1873
- Preceded by: Thomas W. Ferry (4th); Omar D. Conger (5th)
- Succeeded by: Julius C. Burrows (4th); William B. Williams (5th)
- Constituency: 4th district (1871-73); 5th district (1873)

Personal details
- Born: January 8, 1819 Orange County, New York, U.S.
- Died: September 20, 1873 (aged 54) Grand Rapids, Michigan, U.S.
- Party: Republican

Wilder De Ayr Foster (January 8, 1819 – September 20, 1873) was a politician from the U.S. state of Michigan.

== Biography ==
Foster was born in Orange County, New York where he attended the common schools. He moved to Michigan in 1837, and engaged in the hardware business at Grand Rapids in 1845. He was city treasurer and member of the board of aldermen and then became Mayor of Grand Rapids in 1854. He was a member of the Michigan Senate in 1855 and 1856 and was again mayor of Grand Rapids in 1865 and 1866.

In a special election on April 4, 1871, Foster was elected as a Republican from Michigan's 4th congressional district to the 42nd United States Congress to fill the vacancy caused by the resignation of Thomas White Ferry. (Foster defeated Ferry's brother William, who ran as the Democratic nominee.) In 1872, after new district boundaries were drawn, Foster was reelected to a full term in the 43rd Congress from Michigan's 5th congressional district. In all, Foster served in Congress from December 4, 1871, until his death in Grand Rapids. He is interred there in Fulton Street Cemetery.

== See also ==
- List of members of the United States Congress who died in office (1790–1899)

Political offices
Preceded by Thomas B. Church	Mayor of Grand Rapids, Michigan; 1854	Succeeded by Charles Shepard
Preceded by Charles C. Comstock	Mayor of Grand Rapids, Michigan; 1865-1866	Succeeded by John W. Champlin
U.S. House of Representatives
Preceded by Thomas W. Ferry	United States Representative for the 4th congressional district of Michigan; December 4, 1871 – March 3, 1873	Succeeded by Julius C. Burrows
Preceded by Omar D. Conger	United States Representative for the 5th congressional district of Michigan; March 4, 1873 – September 20, 1873	Succeeded by William B. Williams
