= List of mayors of Grand Rapids, Michigan =

Mayor of the City of Grand Rapids
- Seal of the City of Grand Rapids

- Flag of the City of Grand Rapids
- Incumbent; David LaGrand since January 1, 2025
- Formation: 1850
- First holder: Henry R. Williams
- Website: Official website

This is a list of mayors of Grand Rapids, Michigan. The current mayor is David LaGrand, who was sworn into office on January 1, 2025.

== List of mayors ==
No.	Portrait	Name	Term start	Term end	Party	Notes
1		Henry R. Williams	1850	1851	Whig	
2		Ralph W. Cole	1851	1852	Whig	
3		William H. Withey	1852	1853	Whig	
4		Thomas B. Church	1853	1854	Democratic	
5		Wilder D. Foster	1854	1855	Republican	
6		Charles Shepard	1855	1856	Republican	
7		John M. Fox	1856	1857	Democratic	
8		William T. Powers	1857	1858	Democratic	
9		Gilbert M. McCray	1858	1859	Democratic	
10		George K. Johnson	1859	1860	Democratic	
11		Martin L. Sweet	1860	1861	Republican	
12		George H. White	1861	1862	Democratic	
13		Charles C. Comstock	1863	1864	Democratic	
14		Wilder D. Foster	1865	1866		
15		John W. Champlin	1867	1868	Democratic	
16		Moses V. Aldrich	1868	1870	Republican	
17		Leonard H. Randall	1871	1871	Democratic	
18		Julius Houseman	1872	1873	Democratic	
19		Peter R. L. Pierce	1873	1874	Republican	
20		Julius Houseman	1874	1875	Democratic	
21		Peter R. L. Pierce	1875	1876	Republican	
22		William Montague Ferry	1876	1877		
23		George W. Thayer	1877	1878	Democratic	
24		Henry S. Smith	1878	1879	Greenback	
25		Francis Letellier	1879	1880	Republican	
26		Henry S. Smith	1880	1881	Greenback	
27		George G. Steketee	1881	1882	Republican	
28		Edmund B. Dikeman	1882	1883		
29		Crawford Angell	1883	1884	Democratic	
30		Charles E. Belknap	1884	1885	Republican	
31		John L. Curtis	1885	1886	Greenback-Democrat	
32		Edmund B. Dikeman	1886	1887	Democratic	
33		Isaac M. Weston	1888	1889	Democratic	
34		John Killean	1889	1891	Democratic	
35		Edwin F. Uhl	1891	1892	Democratic	
36		William J. Stuart	1892	1893	Republican	
37		Ernest B. Fisher	1894	1895	Republican	
38		Charles D. Stebbins	1895	1896	Democratic	
39		Lathrop C. Stow	1896	1897	Republican	
40		George R. Perry	1898	1901	Democratic	
41		W. Millard Palmer	1902	1903	Republican	
42		Edwin F. Sweet	1904	1905	Democratic	
43		George E. Ellis	1905	1915	Republican	
44		George P. Tilma	1916	1917	Republican	
45		Philo C. Fuller	1917	1918		
46		Christian Gallmeyer	1918	1920		
47		John McNabb	1921	1922		
48		William Oltman	1922	1923		
49		Julius Tisch	1923	1924		
50		Elvin Swarthout	1924	1926		
51		John D. Karel	1930	1933		
52		William Timmers	1934	1935		
53		Tunis Johnson	1936	1937	Democratic	
54		George W. Welsh	1938	1949	Republican	
55		Stanley J. Davis (interim)	1949	1950		
56		Paul G. Goebel	1950	1953		
57		George Veldman	1954	1955		
58		Paul G. Goebel	1956	1957		
59		Stanley J. Davis	1958	1963	Democratic	
60		C. H. Sonneveldt	1964	1969		
61		Robert Boelens	1970	1971		
62		Lyman S. Parks	1971	1975		First African American mayor
63		Abe L. Drasin	1976	1983		First Jewish mayor
64		Gerald R. Helmholdt	1984	1991		
65		John H. Logie	1992	2003		
66		George Heartwell	2004	2015	Democrat	
67		Rosalynn Bliss	2016	2024	Democratic	First woman mayor
68		David LaGrand	2025	Present	Democratic	
