= 1878 Michigan gubernatorial election =

- November 5, 1878
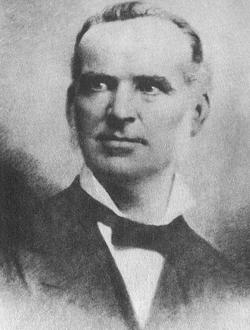

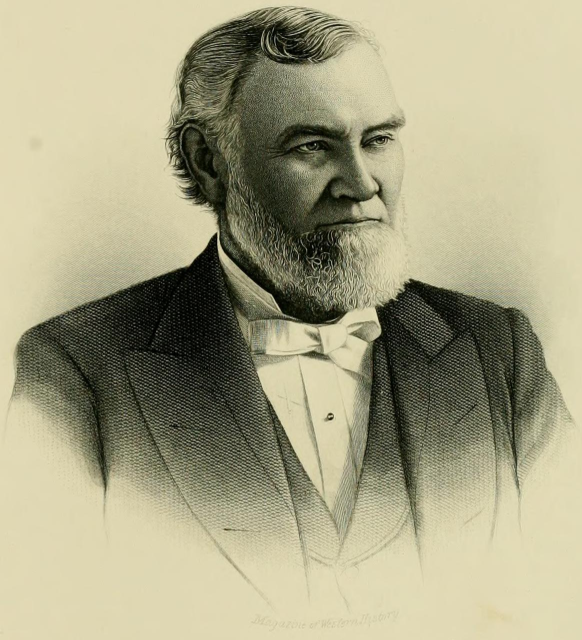

Nominee	Charles Croswell	Orlando M. Barnes	Henry S. Smith
Party	Republican	Democratic	Greenback
Popular vote	126,367	78,548	74,247
Percentage	44.69%	27.78%	26.26%
- County results Croswell: 40–50% 50–60% 60–70% Barnes: 30–40% 40–50% 50–60% 60–70% 70–80% Smith: 30–40% 40–50% No Votes
Governor before election
Charles Croswell
Republican
Elected Governor
Charles Croswell
Republican

The 1878 Michigan gubernatorial election was held on November 5, 1878. Incumbent Republican Charles Croswell defeated Democratic nominee Orlando M. Barnes with 44.69% of the vote.

== General election ==
=== Candidates ===
- Orlando M. Barnes, mayor of Lansing and former State Representative (Democratic)
- Charles Croswell, former State Senator and Speaker of the Michigan House of Representatives (Republican)
- Henry S. Smith (Greenback)
- Watson Snyder (Prohibition)

=== Results ===
1878 Michigan gubernatorial election (Note: Imperfect votes have been assigned to their respective intended candidates. Certified totals: Croswell 126,280; Barnes 78,503; Smith 73,313; Snyder 3,469; Imperfect 1,171; Scattering 25; Blank 4.)
Party	Candidate	Votes	%	±%
Republican	Charles Croswell (inc.)	126,367	44.69%	−7.50%
Democratic	Orlando M. Barnes	78,548	27.78%	−17.07%
Greenback	Henry S. Smith	74,247	26.26%	+23.63%
Prohibition	Watson Snyder	3,574	1.26%	+0.99%
	Scattering	25	0.01%	
	Blank	4	0.00%	
Majority		47,819	16.91%	
Total votes		221,423	100.00%	
Republican hold		Swing	+9.57%	

==== Results by county ====
No votes were recorded in Roscommon County. Emmet County voted Republican for the first time since 1854. Barry County, Kent County, Newaygo County, and St. Joseph County did not vote Republican for the first time since the party's founding in 1854. This was also first election in which Barry County and Newaygo County failed to back the winning candidate. St. Joseph County failed to back the winning candidate for the first time since 1839.

County	Charles Croswell Republican		Orlando M. Barnes Democratic		Henry S. Smith Greenback		Watson Snyder Prohibition		Margin (Note: Croswell over Barnes unless otherwise noted)		Total votes cast
County	#	%	#	%	#	%	#	%	#	%	Total votes cast
Alcona	215	47.46%	219	48.34%	18	3.97%	1	0.22%	-4	-0.88%	453
Allegan	3,206	47.51%	364	5.39%	3,170	46.98%	8	0.12%	36 (Note: Croswell's margin over Smith)	0.53%	6,748
Alpena	618	42.95%	719	49.97%	101	7.02%	1	0.07%	-101	-7.02%	1,439
Antrim	377	59.00%	37	5.79%	224	35.05%	1	0.16%	153	23.94%	639
Baraga	133	39.23%	205	60.47%	0	0.00%	1	0.29%	-72	-21.24%	339
Barry	2,224	42.03%	553	10.45%	2,386	45.09%	129	2.44%	-162 (Note: Smith's margin over Croswell)	-3.06%	5,292
Bay	1,387	28.30%	1,592	32.48%	1,909	38.95%	11	0.22%	-317 (Note: Smith's margin over Barnes)	-6.47%	4,901 (Note: Includes 2 Scattering votes)
Benzie	324	53.91%	41	6.82%	234	38.94%	2	0.33%	90	14.98%	601
Berrien	3,241	47.07%	2,199	31.93%	1,434	20.82%	0	0.00%	1,042	15.13%	6,886 (Note: Includes 12 Scattering votes)
Branch	3,013	46.82%	362	5.63%	2,966	46.09%	94	1.46%	47	0.73%	6,435
Calhoun	3,422	44.70%	1,517	19.81%	2,427	31.70%	290	3.79%	995	13.00%	7,656
Cass	2,325	50.09%	1,414	30.46%	899	19.37%	4	0.09%	911	19.63%	4,642
Charlevoix	476	65.75%	94	12.98%	153	21.13%	1	0.14%	323	44.61%	724
Cheboygan	262	36.04%	276	37.96%	189	26.00%	0	0.00%	-14	-1.93%	727
Chippewa	272	46.90%	308	53.10%	0	0.00%	0	0.00%	-36	-6.21%	580
Clare	249	42.64%	171	29.28%	156	26.71%	8	1.37%	78	13.36%	584
Clinton	2,446	42.93%	2,124	37.28%	1,100	19.31%	27	0.47%	322	5.65%	5,697
Delta	572	68.18%	260	30.99%	7	0.83%	0	0.00%	312	37.19%	839
Eaton	3,139	46.57%	1,225	18.17%	2,140	31.75%	237	3.52%	999	14.82%	6,741
Emmet	402	43.79%	361	39.32%	155	16.88%	0	0.00%	41	4.47%	918
Genesee	3,598	46.31%	1,811	23.31%	1,982	25.51%	379	4.88%	1,616	20.80%	7,770
Gladwin	164	54.67%	71	23.67%	65	21.67%	0	0.00%	93	31.00%	300
Grand Traverse	864	66.98%	121	9.38%	302	23.41%	3	0.23%	562	43.57%	1,290
Gratiot	1,646	45.73%	789	21.92%	1,158	32.18%	5	0.14%	488	13.56%	3,599 (Note: Includes 1 Scattering vote)
Hillsdale	3,875	51.19%	743	9.82%	2,913	38.48%	39	0.52%	962	12.71%	7,570
Houghton	1,880	62.23%	1,141	37.77%	0	0.00%	0	0.00%	739	24.46%	3,021
Huron	976	50.44%	705	36.43%	240	12.40%	14	0.72%	271	14.01%	1,935
Ingham	3,141	42.02%	2,647	35.41%	1,586	21.22%	101	1.35%	494	6.61%	7,475
Ionia	2,864	43.79%	1,263	19.31%	2,227	34.05%	187	2.86%	637	9.74%	6,541
Iosco	465	49.36%	314	33.33%	161	17.09%	2	0.21%	151	16.03%	942
Isabella	844	49.33%	439	25.66%	427	24.96%	1	0.06%	405	23.67%	1,711
Jackson	3,051	35.09%	1,829	21.04%	3,570	41.06%	244	2.81%	-519	-5.97%	8,694
Kalamazoo	3,480	50.35%	2,286	33.08%	1,074	15.54%	71	1.03%	1,194	17.28%	6,911
Kalkaska	353	57.03%	155	25.04%	101	16.32%	10	1.62%	198	31.99%	619
Kent	5,691	42.38%	1,634	12.17%	6,076	45.25%	24	0.18%	-385	-2.87%	13,427
Keweenaw	482	58.78%	307	37.44%	29	3.54%	0	0.00%	175	21.34%	820
Lake	312	57.88%	105	19.48%	122	22.63%	0	0.00%	190	35.25%	539
Lapeer	2,619	53.64%	1,906	39.03%	349	7.15%	9	0.18%	713	14.60%	4,883
Leelanau	394	46.03%	306	35.75%	156	18.22%	0	0.00%	88	10.28%	856
Lenawee	4,710	45.16%	2,864	27.46%	2,421	23.21%	435	4.17%	1,846	17.70%	10,430
Livingston	2,387	45.87%	2,514	48.31%	260	5.00%	43	0.83%	-127	-2.44%	5,204
Mackinac	55	22.63%	188	77.37%	0	0.00%	0	0.00%	-133	-54.73%	243
Macomb	2,036	40.09%	2,391	47.09%	615	12.11%	36	0.71%	-355	-6.99%	5,078
Manistee	591	32.94%	816	45.48%	354	19.73%	33	1.84%	-225	-12.54%	1,794
Manitou	33	16.75%	154	78.17%	10	5.08%	0	0.00%	-121	-61.42%	197
Marquette	1,985	63.68%	997	31.99%	104	3.34%	31	0.99%	988	31.70%	3,117
Mason	670	46.14%	384	26.45%	398	27.41%	0	0.00%	272	18.73%	1,452
Mecosta	1,192	53.38%	311	13.93%	729	32.65%	1	0.04%	463	20.73%	2,233
Menominee	729	56.64%	473	36.75%	85	6.60%	0	0.00%	256	19.89%	1,287
Midland	607	46.73%	130	10.01%	554	42.65%	8	0.62%	53	4.08%	1,299
Missaukee	169	66.80%	37	14.62%	47	18.58%	0	0.00%	122	48.22%	253
Monroe	2,184	35.74%	2,674	43.76%	1,238	20.26%	15	0.25%	-490	-8.02%	6,111
Montcalm	2,230	45.45%	1,140	23.23%	1,494	30.45%	43	0.88%	736	15.00%	4,907
Muskegon	1,730	54.56%	558	17.60%	880	27.75%	3	0.09%	850	26.81%	3,171
Newaygo	964	39.90%	282	11.67%	1,147	47.48%	19	0.79%	-183	-7.57%	2,416 (Note: Includes 4 Scattering votes)
Oakland	4,133	43.56%	4,192	44.18%	1,018	10.73%	146	1.54%	-59	-0.62%	9,489
Oceana	920	49.36%	179	9.60%	743	39.86%	22	1.18%	177	9.50%	1,864
Ogemaw	76	25.50%	122	40.94%	100	33.56%	0	0.00%	-22 (Note: Barnes' margin over Smith)	-7.38%	298
Ontonagon	184	37.86%	236	48.56%	65	13.37%	1	0.21%	-52	-10.70%	486
Osceola	598	49.34%	220	18.15%	262	21.62%	132	10.89%	336	27.72%	1,212
Otsego	251	44.66%	118	21.00%	191	33.99%	2	0.36%	60	10.68%	562
Ottawa	2,390	45.98%	1,056	20.32%	1,719	33.07%	32	0.62%	671	12.91%	5,198 (Note: Includes 1 Blank vote)
Presque Isle	198	50.38%	195	49.62%	0	0.00%	0	0.00%	3	0.76%	393
Saginaw	2,767	34.98%	3,099	39.18%	1,960	24.78%	84	1.06%	-332	-4.20%	7,910
Sanilac	1,453	51.82%	636	22.68%	714	25.46%	1	0.04%	739	26.36%	2,804
Schoolcraft	81	66.39%	41	33.61%	0	0.00%	0	0.00%	40	32.79%	122
Shiawassee	2,522	46.62%	1,679	31.04%	1,005	18.58%	203	3.75%	843	15.58%	5,410
St. Clair	2,999	43.63%	2,404	34.97%	1,466	21.33%	2	0.03%	595	8.66%	6,874 (Note: Includes 3 Blank votes)
St. Joseph	2,263	39.71%	909	15.95%	2,517	44.17%	10	0.18%	-254	-4.46%	5,699
Tuscola	1,977	53.90%	594	16.19%	1,094	29.83%	3	0.08%	883	24.07%	3,668
Van Buren	3,016	48.25%	1,025	16.40%	2,195	35.11%	15	0.24%	821	13.13%	6,251
Washtenaw	3,338	41.09%	3,239	39.87%	1,302	16.03%	244	3.00%	99	1.22%	8,124
Wayne	9,337	38.38%	9,967	40.97%	4,917	20.21%	105	0.43%	-630	-2.59%	24,326
Wexford	590	51.80%	111	9.75%	437	38.37%	1	0.09%	153	13.43%	1,139
Total	126,367	44.69%	78,548	27.78%	74,247	26.26%	3,574	1.26%	47,819	16.91%	282,765

===== Counties that flipped from Democratic to Republican =====
- Emmet
- Gladwin
- Presque Isle
- Washtenaw

===== Counties that flipped from Republican to Democratic =====
- Manistee
- Ogemaw

===== Counties that flipped from Republican to Greenback =====
- Barry
- Kent
- Newaygo
- St. Joseph

===== Counties that flipped from Democratic to Greenback =====
- Bay
- Jackson
