= Julius Houseman =

American politician (1832–1891)

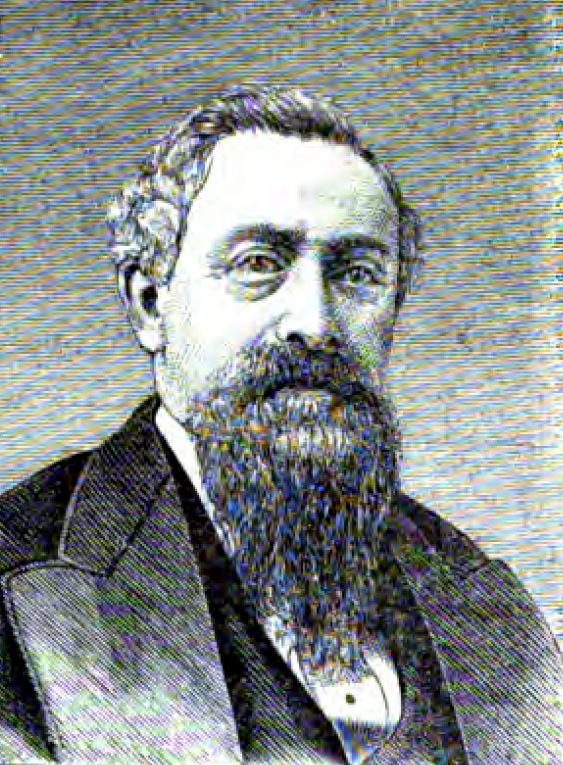

Member of the U.S. House of Representatives from Michigan's 5th district
- In office March 4, 1883 – March 3, 1885
- Preceded by: George W. Webber
- Succeeded by: Charles C. Comstock

18th and 20th Mayor of Grand Rapids
- In office 1874–1874
- Preceded by: Peter R. L. Peirce
- Succeeded by: Peter R. L. Peirce
- In office 1872–1872
- Preceded by: Leonard H. Randall
- Succeeded by: Peter R. L. Peirce

Member of the Michigan House of Representatives from the Kent County 1st district
- In office 1871–1872
- Preceded by: George G. Briggs

Personal details
- Born: December 8, 1832 near Bamberg, Kingdom of Bavaria, German Confederation
- Died: February 8, 1891 (aged 58) Grand Rapids, Michigan, U.S.

Julius Houseman (December 8, 1832 – February 8, 1891) was an American businessman and politician who served as mayor of Grand Rapids, Michigan, as representative in the Michigan House of Representatives and as congressman in the U.S. House of Representatives.

== Early life ==
He was born in Zeckendorf (near Bamberg), in the Kingdom of Bavaria in the German Confederation. His father, Solomon Houseman, was a merchant and manufacturer of silk and cotton goods in Zeckendorf. Houseman was educated in the national schools of Zeckendorf and Bamberg and finished with a two-year course of study at a commercial school at Munich. He then worked as dry goods clerk in a store in Bavaria, where he remained for three years.

== Career ==
He immigrated to the United States in 1851, at the age of nineteen, stopping first in Cincinnati, Ohio, where he was clerk in a clothing house for a few months. He then moved to New Vienna, Ohio, where he remained as clerk in a general store until March 1852. He then moved to Battle Creek, Michigan, and engaged in the merchant tailoring and clothing business with Mr. I. Amberg, the firm name being Amberg & Houseman. He moved to Grand Rapids in August 1852, before he was twenty years old, and established a branch of the Battle Creek firm. He is recognized as the first permanent Jewish settler of Grand Rapids.

The business prospered, and in 1854, he became sole proprietor, which he continued for nine years. In 1864 the firm of Houseman, Alsberg & Co. was organized, with branch houses in New York, Baltimore and Savannah. The firm continued until 1870, when it was dissolved, with Mr. Houseman retaining possession of the Grand Rapids establishment. In 1876 he disposed of his business to his cousin, Joseph Houseman, who had been a partner for several years, and Moses May, who continued it for a number of years under the firm name of Houseman & May, which was later succeeded by Houseman, Donally & Jones.

Houseman had developed an active interest in other lines of business and investments, notably in timber lands and the manufacture of pine lumber in Michigan, and after 1876 devoted himself largely to those interests. He was one of the largest holders of real estate in the Grand Rapids area and also held large tracts in the Upper Peninsula of Michigan and in other states.

He also became involved with other business interests in Grand Rapids. In 1870 he became a stockholder in the City National bank, the predecessor of the National City bank. In August 1874, he was chosen a director to fill the vacancy caused by the resignation of the late Ransom E. Wood, who was going to Europe with his family.

In 1882, at the annual meeting in January he was chosen vice president of the bank when the late William B. Ledyard declined a re-election because of infirm health. Houseman was one of the organizers of the Grand Rapids chair company, serving as a director and vice president. He was also a director of the Grand Rapids Brush company and a leading stockholder, director and president of the Grand Rapids Fire Insurance company. He was one of the founders and directors of the Michigan Trust company and was also identified with many other enterprises.

== Political career ==
Houseman was also active in the political arena. He was member of the board of aldermen of Grand Rapids for eight years, from 1863 to 1870. He represented the first district of Kent County in the Michigan House of Representatives from 1871 to 1872, He served two terms as mayor of Grand Rapids in 1872-1873 and 1874–1875 and was an unsuccessful candidate for lieutenant governor in 1876. He was elected as a Fusion candidate and seated with the Democrats in the United States House of Representatives from Michigan's 5th congressional district, serving from 1883 to 1885, the first Jewish representative from Michigan. He was not a candidate for reelection in 1884 and resumed his former business pursuits.

He became a member of the Freemasons in 1854 and was a member of the Odd Fellows and of the B'nai B'rith. He was a charter member of the local Peninsular Club and was a member of the local Owashtanong club. He was influential in forming the Temple Emanuel in 1857, the fifth oldest reform congregation in the United States, and in founding the first Jewish organization in Grand Rapids, the Jewish Benevolent and Burial Society.

== Death and legacy ==
He died in Grand Rapids and is interred in Oak Hill Cemetery there. He left a large property, estimated to be worth approximately a million dollars. He was survived by his daughter, an only child, Mrs. David M. Amberg and family of Grand Rapids; his sister, Mrs. M. Alsberg of New York city; William Houseman, a half brother; Mrs. Simon Mainzer, a half sister, and his cousin, Mr. Joseph Houseman and family. There were also several half-brothers and half-sisters in Germany.

In 1907, his daughter, Hattie Houseman Amberg, donated six acres (24,000 m^{2}) of land to the Grand Rapids Board of Education for use as an athletic field in memory of her father. In 1924, she gave an additional adjoining tract of land. The Houseman Field continues be shared by several Grand Rapids area high schools.

== See also ==
- List of Jewish members of the United States Congress

Political offices
Preceded by Leonard H. Randall	Mayor of Grand Rapids, Michigan; 1872	Succeeded by Peter R. L. Peirce
Preceded by Peter R. L. Peirce	Mayor of Grand Rapids, Michigan; 1874	Succeeded by Peter R. L. Peirce
U.S. House of Representatives
Preceded by George W. Webber	United States Representative for the 5th congressional district of Michigan; 1883 – 1885	Succeeded by Charles C. Comstock
