= 1874 Michigan gubernatorial election =

- November 3, 1874
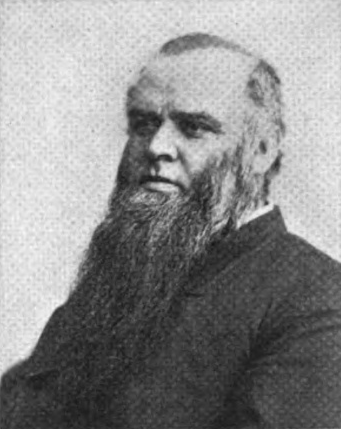

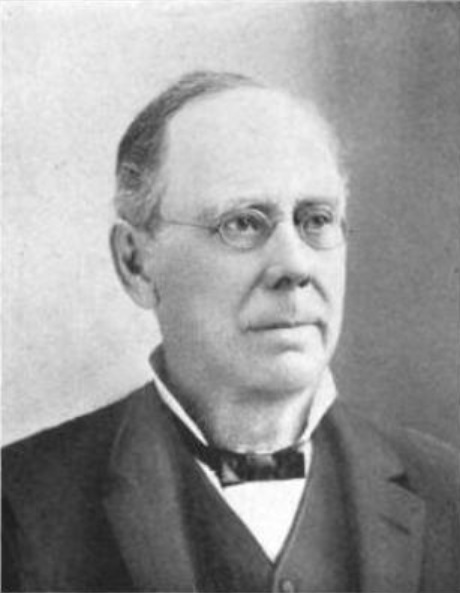
Nominee	John J. Bagley	Henry Chamberlain
Party	Republican	Democratic
Popular vote	111,757	105,561
Percentage	50.47%	47.67%
- County results Bagley: 40–50% 50–60% 60–70% 70–80% 80–90% Chamberlain: 40–50% 50–60% 60–70% 80–90% No data/vote
Governor before election
John J. Bagley
Republican
Elected Governor
John J. Bagley
Republican

The 1874 Michigan gubernatorial election was held on November 3, 1874. Incumbent Republican John J. Bagley defeated Democratic nominee Henry Chamberlain with 50.47% of the vote.

== General election ==
=== Candidates ===
- John J. Bagley, incumbent governor (Republican)
- Thomas E. Carpenter (Prohibition)
- Henry Chamberlain, former state representative from Three Oaks (Democratic)

=== Results ===
1874 Michigan gubernatorial election (Note: Imperfect votes have been assigned to their respective intended candidates. Certified totals: Bagley 111,519; Chamberlain 105,550; Carpenter 3,937; Imperfect 301; Scattering 115; Blank 1.)
Party	Candidate	Votes	%	±%
Republican	John J. Bagley (inc.)	111,757	50.47%	−11.36%
Democratic	Henry Chamberlain	105,561	47.67%	+11.30%
Prohibition	Thomas E. Carpenter	3,989	1.80%	+1.25%
	Scattering	115	0.05%	
	Blank	1	0.00%	
Majority		6,196	2.80%	
Total votes		221,423	100.00%	
Republican hold		Swing	-22.65%	

==== Results by county ====
No votes were recorded in Manitou County and Presque Isle County. Mason County voted Democratic for the first time ever in this election. Clinton County voted Democratic for the first time since 1851, while Ionia County and Lenawee County did the same for the first time since 1852. Ionia County and Lenawee County also failed to back the winning candidate for the first time in this election.

County	John J. Bagley Republican		Henry Chamberlain Democratic		Thomas E. Carpenter Prohibition		Margin		Total votes cast
County	#	%	#	%	#	%	#	%	Total votes cast
Alcona	221	72.94%	82	27.06%	0	0.00%	139	45.87%	303
Allegan	2,630	52.33%	2,390	47.55%	0	0.00%	240	4.78%	5,026 (Note: Includes 6 Scattering votes)
Alpena	491	53.08%	432	46.70%	2	0.22%	59	6.38%	925
Antrim	279	80.17%	69	19.83%	0	0.00%	210	60.34%	348
Allegan	1,939	55.16%	1,536	43.70%	40	1.14%	403	11.47%	3,515
Bay	1,742	46.66%	1,981	53.07%	10	0.27%	-239	-6.40%	3,733
Benzie	414	83.64%	81	16.36%	0	0.00%	333	67.27%	495
Berrien	2,935	49.40%	2,998	50.46%	0	0.00%	-63	-1.06%	5,941 (Note: Includes 8 Scattering votes)
Branch	2,419	55.44%	1,905	43.66%	39	0.89%	514	11.78%	4,363
Calhoun	3,372	53.67%	2,767	44.04%	144	2.29%	605	9.63%	6,283
Cass	2,049	50.77%	1,948	48.27%	38	0.94%	101	2.50%	4,036 (Note: Includes 1 Blank vote)
Charlevoix	248	70.06%	105	29.66%	1	0.28%	143	40.40%	354
Cheboygan	136	42.37%	185	57.63%	0	0.00%	-49	-15.26%	321
Chippewa	172	55.84%	136	44.16%	0	0.00%	36	11.69%	308
Clare	223	55.47%	179	44.53%	0	0.00%	44	10.95%	402
Clinton	1,868	43.24%	2,149	49.75%	302	6.99%	-281	-6.50%	4,320 (Note: Includes 1 Scattering votes)
Delta	548	56.44%	423	43.56%	0	0.00%	125	12.87%	971
Eaton	2,460	52.34%	1,916	40.77%	324	6.89%	544	11.57%	4,700
Emmet	51	16.50%	254	82.20%	0	0.00%	-203	-65.70%	309 (Note: Includes 4 Scattering votes)
Genesee	3,338	52.60%	2,867	45.18%	140	2.21%	471	7.42%	6,346
Grand Traverse	568	86.32%	84	12.77%	6	0.91%	484	73.56%	658
Gratiot	1,140	53.98%	969	45.88%	3	0.14%	171	8.10%	2,112
Hillsdale	3,923	62.49%	2,308	36.76%	46	0.73%	1,615	25.72%	6,278
Houghton	1,066	44.20%	1,341	55.60%	4	0.17%	-275	-11.40%	2,412
Huron	811	56.67%	620	43.33%	0	0.00%	191	13.35%	1,431
Ingham	3,032	47.35%	3,085	48.17%	287	4.48%	-53	-0.83%	6,404
Ionia	2,535	47.30%	2,708	50.53%	116	2.16%	-173	-3.23%	5,359
Iosco	390	57.95%	283	42.05%	0	0.00%	107	15.90%	673
Isabella	495	48.67%	519	51.03%	3	0.29%	-24	-2.36%	1,017
Jackson	3,165	40.95%	4,153	53.73%	411	5.32%	-988	-12.78%	7,729
Kalamazoo	2,946	48.32%	2,941	48.24%	210	3.44%	5	0.08%	6,097
Kalkaska	172	76.79%	52	23.21%	0	0.00%	120	53.57%	224
Kent	4,612	49.22%	4,494	47.96%	265	2.83%	118	1.26%	9,371
Keweenaw	502	51.91%	462	47.78%	2	0.21%	40	4.14%	967
Lake	294	72.59%	111	27.41%	0	0.00%	183	45.19%	405
Lapeer	1,987	55.78%	1,562	43.85%	13	0.36%	425	11.93%	3,562
Leelanau	331	79.38%	86	20.62%	0	0.00%	245	58.75%	417
Lenawee	4,834	47.51%	4,866	47.82%	473	4.65%	-32	-0.31%	10,175 (Note: Includes 2 Scattering votes)
Livingston	2,263	47.84%	2,364	49.98%	103	2.18%	-101	-2.14%	4,730
Mackinac	55	32.16%	116	67.84%	0	0.00%	-61	-35.67%	171
Macomb	1,867	39.96%	2,638	56.46%	167	3.57%	-771	-16.50%	4,672
Manistee	635	43.98%	785	54.36%	24	1.66%	-150	-10.39%	1,444
Marquette	1,400	47.99%	1,517	52.01%	0	0.00%	-117	-4.01%	2,917
Mason	425	46.45%	490	53.55%	0	0.00%	-65	-7.10%	915
Mecosta	758	63.32%	362	30.24%	77	6.43%	396	33.08%	1,197
Menominee	440	76.66%	134	23.34%	0	0.00%	306	53.31%	574
Midland	817	63.93%	453	35.45%	8	0.63%	364	28.48%	1,278
Missaukee	83	88.30%	11	11.70%	0	0.00%	72	76.60%	94
Monroe	2,255	43.79%	2,888	56.08%	6	0.12%	-633	-12.29%	5,150
Montcalm	1,699	52.57%	1,495	46.26%	38	1.18%	204	6.31%	3,232
Muskegon	1,385	50.98%	1,326	48.80%	5	0.18%	59	2.17%	2,717
Newaygo	582	61.85%	354	37.62%	5	0.53%	228	24.23%	941
Oakland	3,858	44.41%	4,462	51.36%	368	4.24%	-604	-6.95%	8,688
Oceana	1,147	74.38%	395	25.62%	0	0.00%	752	48.77%	1,542
Ontonagon	195	44.52%	243	55.48%	0	0.00%	-48	-10.96%	438
Osceola	568	67.38%	275	32.62%	0	0.00%	293	34.76%	843
Ottawa	2,003	53.13%	1,756	46.58%	11	0.29%	247	6.55%	3,770
Saginaw	2,775	44.77%	3,418	55.14%	6	0.10%	-643	-10.37%	6,199
Sanilac	1,298	68.35%	591	31.12%	10	0.53%	707	37.23%	1,899
Schoolcraft	43	40.57%	63	59.43%	0	0.00%	-20	-18.87%	106
Shiawassee	2,381	52.69%	2,064	45.67%	73	1.62%	317	7.01%	4,519
St. Clair	2,900	53.24%	2,484	45.60%	61	1.12%	416	7.64%	5,447
St. Joseph	2,474	51.01%	2,347	48.39%	25	0.52%	127	2.62%	4,850
Tuscola	1,192	61.73%	724	37.49%	0	0.00%	468	24.24%	1,931 (Note: Includes 15 Scattering votes)
Van Buren	2,653	54.69%	2,159	44.51%	38	0.78%	494	10.18%	4,851
Washtenaw	3,504	46.09%	4,068	53.51%	29	0.38%	-564	-7.42%	7,602
Wayne	9,380	47.23%	10,360	52.17%	56	0.28%	-980	-4.93%	19,860 (Note: Includes 64 Scattering votes)
Wexford	384	69.06%	172	30.94%	0	0.00%	212	38.13%	556
Total	111,757	50.47%	105,561	47.67%	3,989	1.80%	6,196	2.80%	221,423

===== Counties that flipped from Democratic to Republican =====
- Keweenaw

===== Counties that flipped from Republican to Democratic =====
- Bay
- Berrien
- Cheboygan
- Clinton
- Houghton
- Ingham
- Ionia
- Isabella
- Jackson
- Lenawee
- Livingston
- Macomb
- Manistee
- Marquette
- Mason
- Monroe
- Oakland
- Ontonagon
- Saginaw
- Schoolcraft
- Washtenaw
- Wayne
