= George W. Webber (politician) =

American politician

George Washington Webber
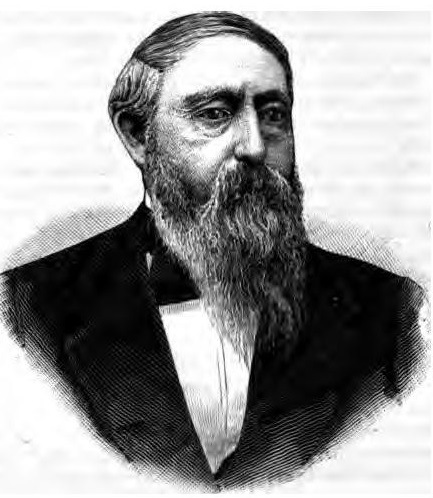
- From 1882's Public Men of To-Day

Member of the U.S. House of Representatives from Michigan's 5th district
- In office March 4, 1881 – March 3, 1883
- Preceded by: John W. Stone
- Succeeded by: Julius Houseman

Personal details
- Born: November 25, 1825 Newbury, Vermont, United States
- Died: January 15, 1900 (aged 74) Ionia, Michigan, United States
- Resting place: Highland Park Cemetery, Ionia, Michigan, United States
- Party: Republican

George Washington Webber (November 25, 1825 – January 15, 1900) was a politician from the U.S. state of Michigan.

Webber was born in Newbury, Vermont. His father, Andrew Webber, moved his family to Steuben County, New York in 1828 and engaged in farming. George Webber attended the common schools there and the academy at Alfred, New York. He engaged in business as a lumber-dealer and general merchant. On July 18, 1850, he married Miss Antoinette C. Abbey of Ulster County, New York. In 1852, Webber moved to Manistee County where he engaged in farming, lumbering, manufacturing, and mercantile pursuits. In the election of 1856, Webber was instrumental in promoting the newly formed Republican Party and the candidacy of John C. Fremont for President, such that only three votes in the entire county went to the Democratic Party candidate.

In 1858, Webber moved to Ionia County, and engaged in mercantile business with his brother, S. W. Webber, at Lyons. After five years, he sold his interest to his brother and moved to Ionia, where he engaged in business with H. J. Wilson, as Webber & Wilson for five years. During the same period, he also engaged in lumbering on the Little Muskegon River with Fred Hall under the name Hall & Webber. After three years, Hall's interest in the enterprise was purchased by A. J Webber, and the firm took the name Webber Brothers. The brothers also established a prosperous farm and founded the village of Mecosta on their land. In 1870, he began a private banking enterprise in Muir with his brother S. W. Webber, to whom he sold his interest after four years. He was one of the most prominent organizers of the Second National Bank of Ionia, where he served first as vice-president and then as president, a position he continued to hold until his death.

Webber was one of the village trustees of Ionia at the time it incorporated as a city and he assisted in drafting the charter. He was twice elected mayor of Ionia, in 1874 and 1875. He was responsible for construction of the Webber Block in 1879 at a cost of $15,000 and the Webber brownstone block in 1880 at a cost of $30,000. Rooms in the latter block were fitted for the use of the Ladies Library Association and donated to their use for as long as Webber or his wife was alive. Webber was also the principal owner of the Second National Bank Block. During his term as mayor, a bridge was built over the Grand River.

Webber was elected as a Republican from Michigan's 5th congressional district to the 47th United States Congress, serving from March 4, 1881 to March 3, 1883. He was not a candidate for re-nomination in 1882.

George W. Webber resumed his former business activities and was a Michigan delegate to Republican National Convention in 1884. His first wife died on April 11, 1890. He married Miss E. Gertrude Brown of Boston on November 2, 1890. He died in Ionia and is interred there in Highland Park Cemetery.

Preceded by John W. Stone	Member of the U.S. House of Representatives from Michigan's 5th congressional district 1881-1883	Succeeded by Julius Houseman
