= Charles Croswell =

American politician (1825–1886)

Charles M. Croswell
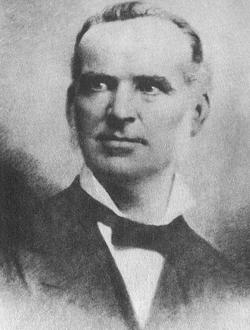

17th Governor of Michigan
- In office January 3, 1877 – January 1, 1881
- Lieutenant: Alonzo Sessions
- Preceded by: John J. Bagley
- Succeeded by: David Jerome

Member of the Michigan Senate
- In office 1863–1868
- Preceded by: William Baker Jr.
- Succeeded by: John K. Boies
- Constituency: 10th district (1863–1866); 8th district (1867–1868)

Personal details
- Born: October 31, 1825 Newburgh, New York, US
- Died: December 13, 1886 (aged 61) Adrian, Michigan, US
- Party: Republican
- Spouses: Lucy M. Eddy (m. 1852; died 1868) Elizabeth Musgrave (m. 1880)

Charles Miller Croswell (October 31, 1825 – December 13, 1886) was the 17th governor of Michigan from 1877 to 1881.

== Early life in New York ==
Croswell was born in Newburgh, New York, the only son of John and Sallie (née Hicks) Croswell. His father, who was of Scots-Irish extraction, was a paper maker, and carried on business in New York City. His ancestors on his mother's side were of Knickerbocker descent. Some members of the Croswell family were connected with notable events in New York and Connecticut, including Harry Croswell, a pro-Federalist newspaper editor, convicted of libel against President Thomas Jefferson in a landmark case in New York. When Croswell was seven years old his mother and younger sister died of fever. A few months later his father accidentally drowned in the Hudson River. Charles was taken in to live with the family of his mother's brother, Daniel Hicks.

== Early life in Michigan ==
In 1837, when Croswell was 12, the Hicks family moved to Adrian, Michigan. At 16, he began studying to be a carpenter—his uncle's trade—and pursued that vocation for four years. According to one biography, he "worked at it very diligently ... maintaining himself, and devoting his spare time to reading and the acquirement of knowledge."

Croswell began to study the law in 1846. That same year, he was appointed Deputy Clerk of Lenawee County. His uncle, Daniel, had been the first Register of Deeds for Lenawee County. In 1847, Hicks went to fight in the Mexican–American War. After returning from the war, Hicks went to Sault Ste. Marie to be a collector of the port there and soon after died from yellow fever, which he had contracted in Mexico. After this, Charles bought the house in Adrian that he had helped to build from his aunt for $1,700.

== Early political career ==
In 1848, Croswell ran on the Whig ticket for the position of County Clerk, but was defeated. In 1850, he was elected as a Whig to be Register of Deeds for the county in 1850 and was re-elected in 1852. In 1854, he took part in the formation of the Republican Party, where he was a member and Secretary of the convention held at Jackson, Michigan.

In 1855 he formed a law partnership with Thomas M. Cooley, who later became Chief Justice of the Michigan Supreme Court. This partnership continued until 1859, when Cooley moved to Ann Arbor. In 1862, Croswell was appointed the City Attorney of Adrian, and in the same year was elected mayor. In the general election in the fall of 1862, he was elected from the 10th District to the Michigan Senate. He was re-elected from the 10th District in 1864 and from the 8th District in 1866. During this whole period he was president pro tempore and Chairman of the Judiciary Committee.

In 1867, Croswell was elected a member of the Constitutional Convention to revise the Michigan Constitution, and selected as the presiding officer. In 1868, he was chosen an elector on the Republican presidential ticket, casting, with his associates, the vote of the State of Michigan for Grant and Colfax. In 1872 he was elected from the Lenawee County 4th District to the Michigan House of Representatives, and made Speaker of the House. He also, for several years, served as Secretary of the State Board of Corrections and Charities, repeatedly visiting nearly all the poor-houses and jails of the state.

== Governorship ==
In 1876 he was nominated by the Republican Party, for Governor of Michigan, and was elected by a majority of 23,434 over his Democratic competitor. He was re-nominated in 1878, and succeeded by a majority of 47,777 over his highest opponent. During his administration the public debt was greatly reduced; a policy adopted requiring the state institutions to keep within the limit of appropriations; laws enacted to provide more effectually for the punishment of corruption and bribery in elections; the State House of Correction at Ionia and the Eastern Asylum for the Insane at Pontiac were opened, and the new capitol building at Lansing was completed and occupied. During his second term, he presided at the dedication of the capitol building and helped prevent great destruction of a riot in Jackson. In 1887, Davisville, a small town in Michigan's Thumb, was renamed Croswell in his honor.

== Personal life ==
Croswell married Lucy M. Eddy, the daughter of Adrian pioneer Morton Eddy, on February 4, 1852. They had five children, only three of whom survived past childhood. Lucy Croswell died of spinal apoplexy on March 19, 1868, while her husband was at the state Republican convention in Detroit. She left behind one son and two daughters: Charles Morton, Harriet (Hattie), and Lucy Elizabeth.

In 1880, Croswell married Elizabeth Musgrave, who was twenty-five years his junior. A daughter by his second wife was born three months after his death.

== Retirement and death ==
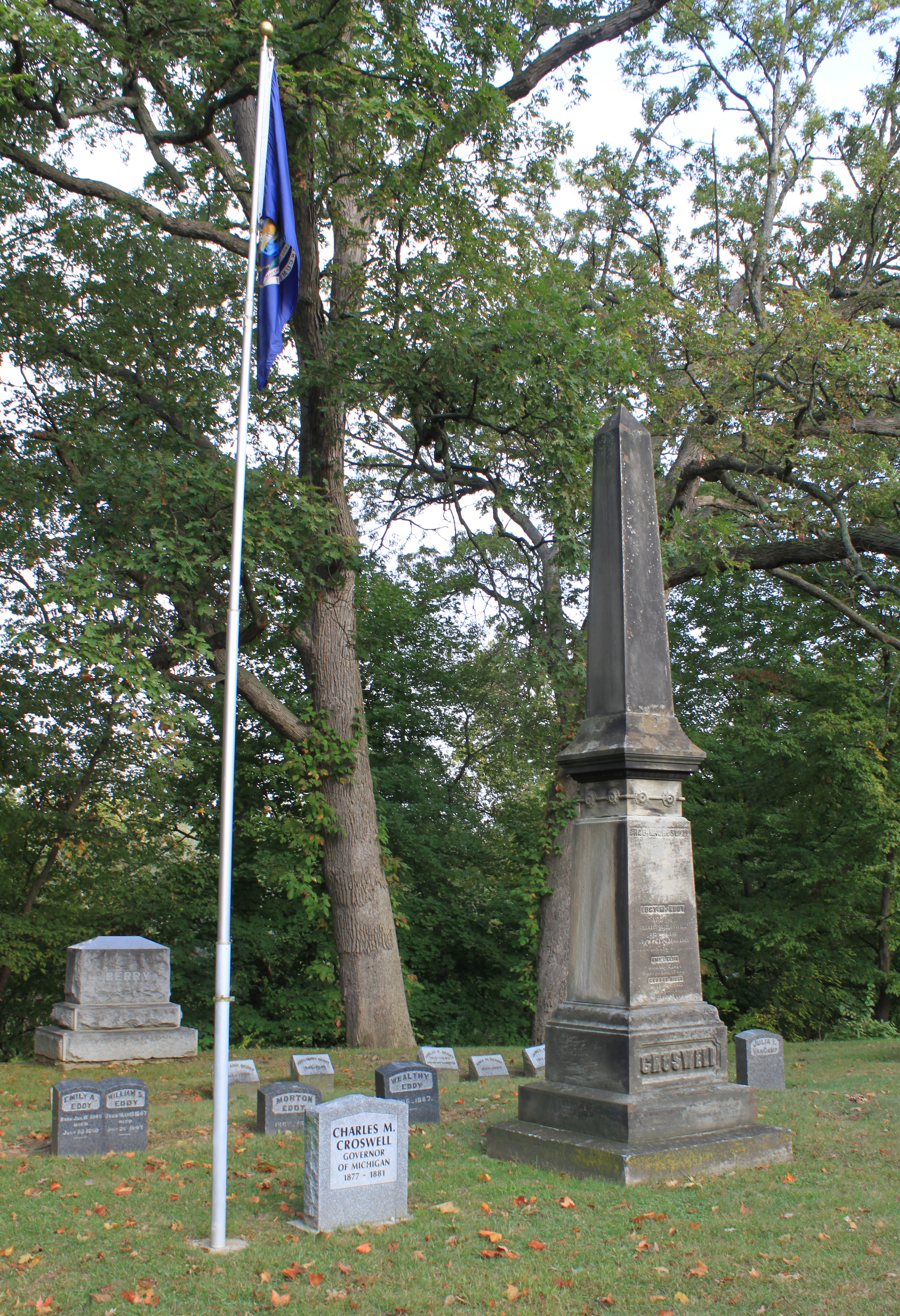
Croswell grave

Croswell returned to Adrian in 1881 after two terms as governor. He was active in retirement, serving as president of the Lenawee County Savings Bank. He also began buying shares in the Adrian Union Hall Company, which operated the town's largest event hall; he eventually became its majority owner and in 1883 installed his son, C.M. Croswell Jr., as its manager. The theater is still in operation and now known as the Croswell Opera House.

One afternoon in December 1886, he sat down by the stove in the offices of the Lenawee County Savings Bank and complained of a chill. This was the beginning of an illness that was to claim his life. He died on December 13, 1886, at the age of 61.

Croswell was buried at Oakwood Cemetery in Adrian. Three months after Croswell's death, his widow gave birth to a daughter, who was named Sallie Hicks Croswell, after Croswell's mother.

Elizabeth later remarried to become Elizabeth Merrill and donated the Croswell home in Adrian to the local chapter of the Daughters of the American Revolution. The home serves as the chapter offices.

The house in Adrian, Michigan where he lived before his governorship was listed as a Michigan State Historic Site in 1958 and later listed on the National Register of Historic Places as the Governor Charles Croswell House in 1972.

== Memorials ==
A painting of Croswell now hangs in the Michigan State Capitol.

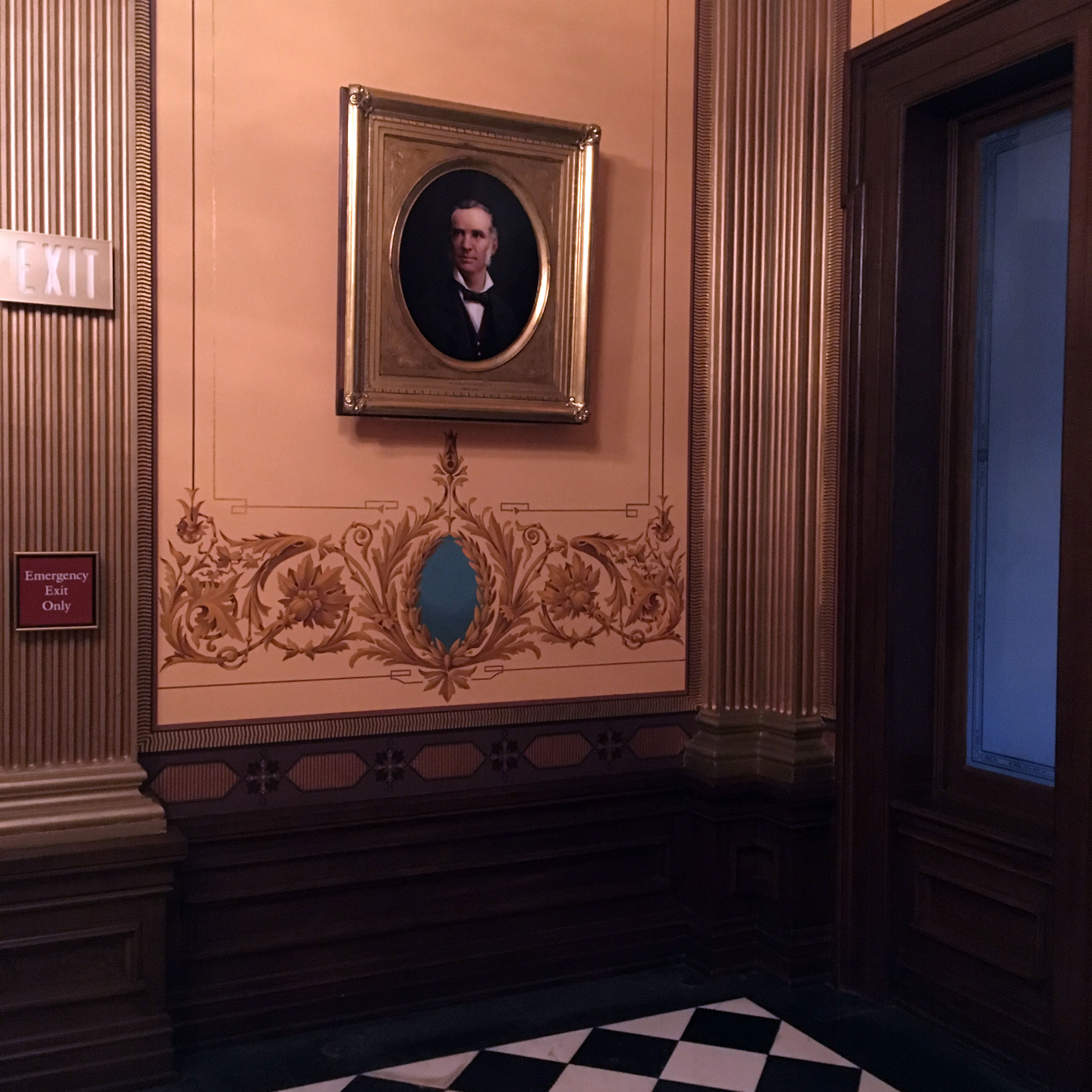
A painting of Charles Croswell the 17th Governor of the US state of Michigan from 1877 to 1881. The painting and frame were created by Joshua Adam Risner in 2017 and now hangs in the Michigan State Capitol.

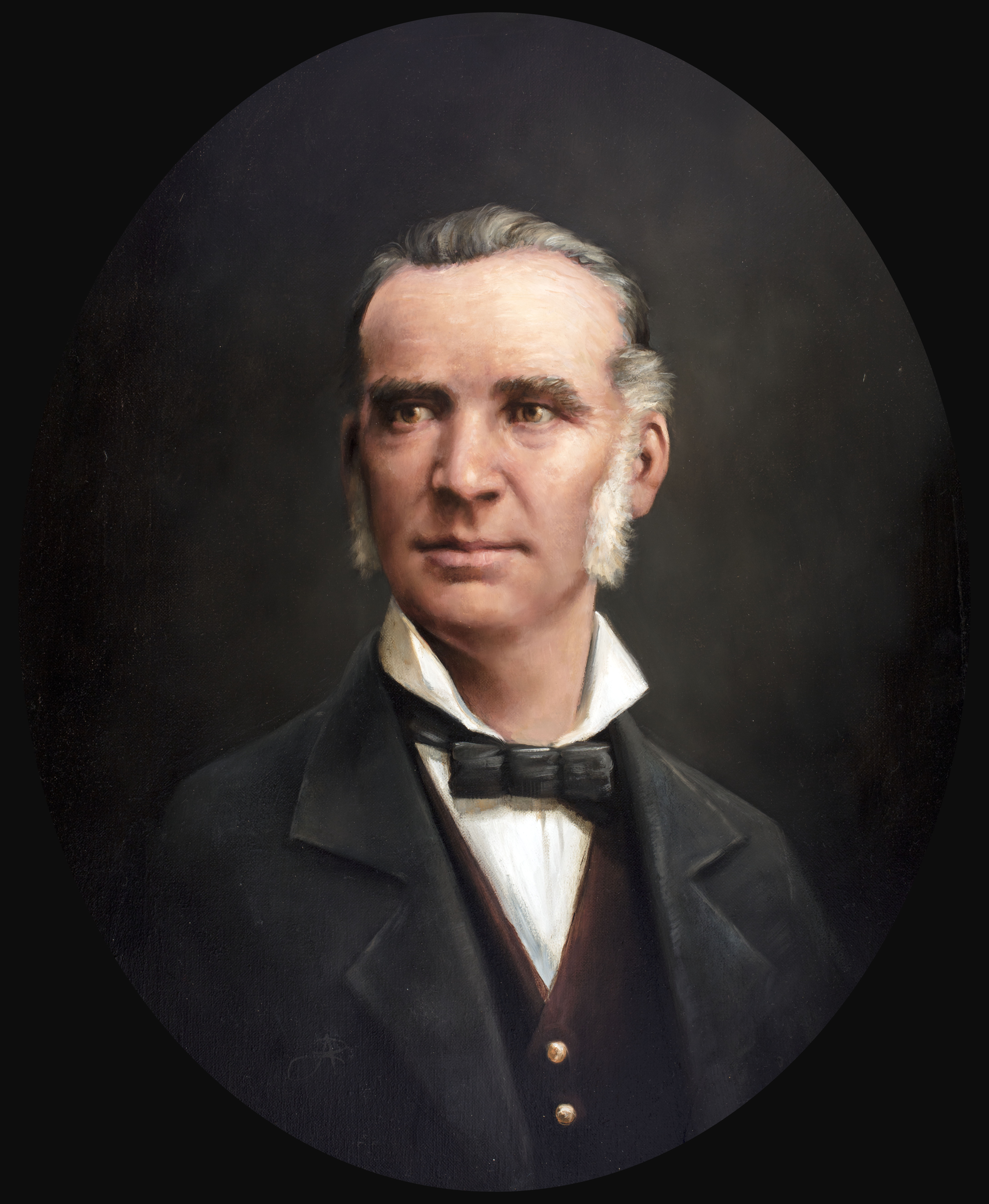
A painting of Charles Croswell the 17th Governor of the US state of Michigan from 1877 to 1881. The painting was created by Joshua Adam Risner in 2017 and now hangs in the Michigan State Capitol.

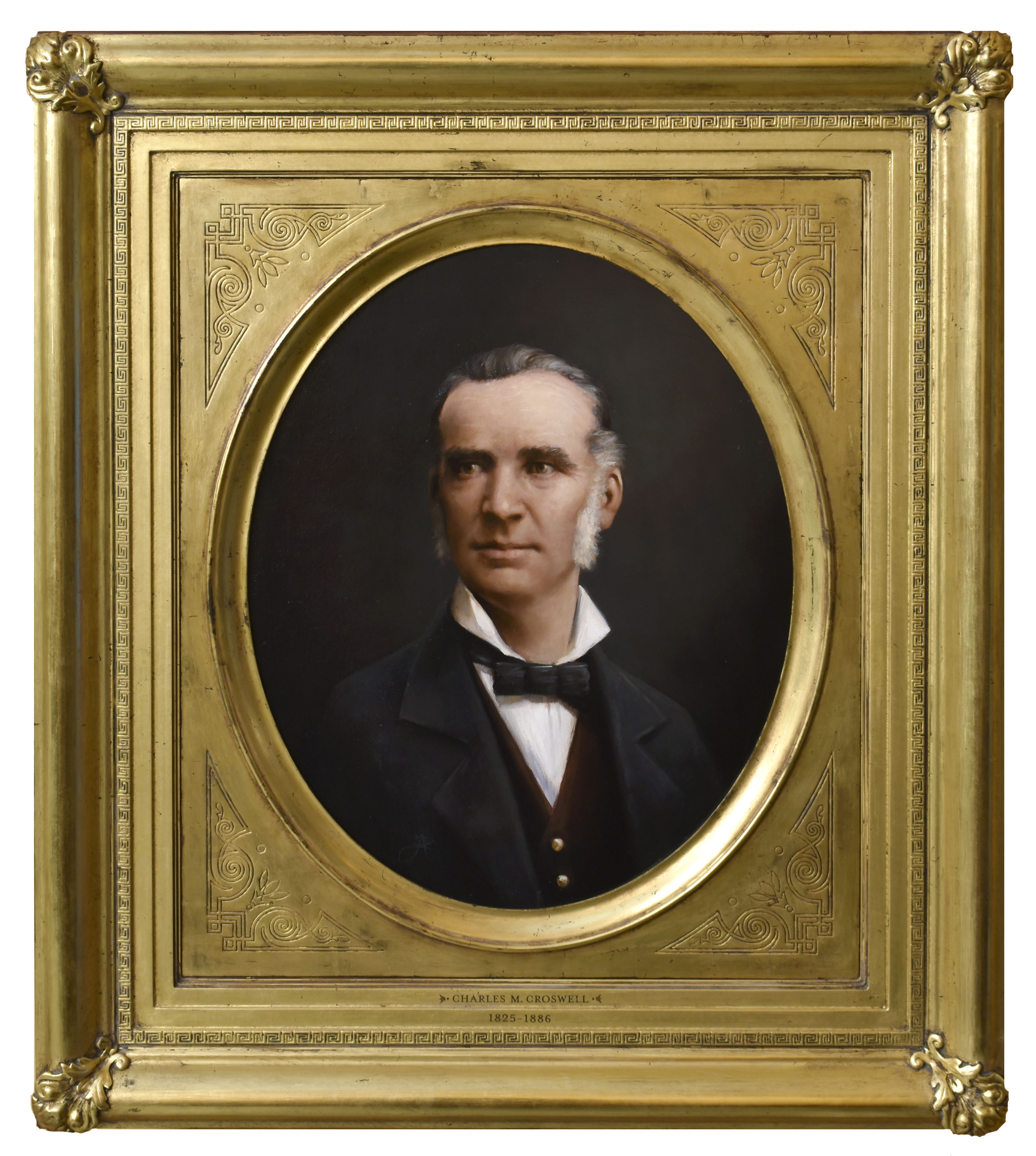
A painting of Charles Croswell the 17th Governor of the US state of Michigan from 1877 to 1881. The painting and frame were created by Joshua Adam Risner in 2017 and now hangs in the Michigan State Capitol.

Party political offices
Preceded by John J. Bagley	Republican nominee for Governor of Michigan; 1876, 1878	Succeeded by David Jerome
Political offices
Preceded by John J. Bagley	Governor of Michigan; 1877–1881	Succeeded by David Jerome
