= John J. Bagley =

American politician

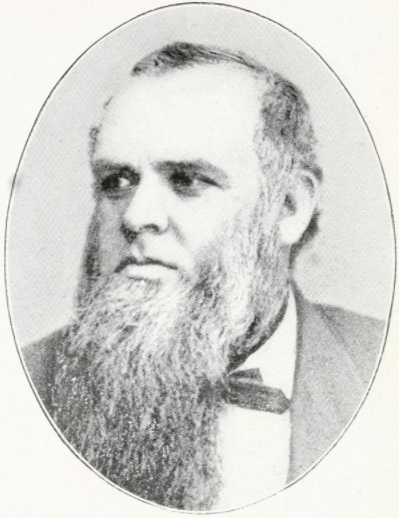

16th Governor of Michigan
- In office January 1, 1873 – January 3, 1877
- Lieutenant: Henry H. Holt
- Preceded by: Henry P. Baldwin
- Succeeded by: Charles Croswell

Personal details
- Born: July 24, 1832 Medina, New York
- Died: July 27, 1881 (aged 49) San Francisco, California
- Party: Republican
- Spouse: Frances E. Newbury (m. 1855)
- Children: 6

John Judson Bagley (July 24, 1832 – July 27, 1881) was a politician from the US state of Michigan, as well as the 16th governor of Michigan.

== Early life in New York and Michigan ==
Bagley was born in Medina, New York to John and Mary M. (Smith) Bagley. Bagley was initially raised in Lockport, New York. However, at the age of eight, he moved with his family to Constantine, Michigan. At age thirteen, he moved, this time to the opposite side of the state – to Owosso, Michigan.

Bagley moved to Detroit, Michigan in 1847 as an apprentice and starting his working career in a small chewing tobacco shop of Isaac Miller. Bagley bought out Miller after seven years and renamed his store the Mayflower Tobacco Company, turning it into an industry leader that competed against other Detroit tobacco brands–at the time, tobacco was a major industry in Detroit. Bagley was a freemason. He was member in Charity Lodge No. 94 in Detroit, Michigan.

== Politics in Michigan ==
In 1855, he won election to the Detroit Board of Education, a position he held three years, by which time he had helped found the Republican Party. He also served as an alderman in Detroit. On January 16, 1855, he married in Dubuque, Iowa to Frances E. Newbury, daughter of Rev. Samuel Newbury, a pioneer missionary of Michigan. They had six children together.

Bagley also served on the Detroit Common Council from 1860 to 1861, and was a member of the Detroit Board of Police Commissioners from 1865 to 1872. Bagley helped to organize the Michigan Mutual Life Insurance Company and served as its president from 1867 to 1872. During that time, he was also chairman of the Michigan Republican Party from 1868 to 1870.

Bagley served as Governor of Michigan between 1873 and 1877. He encouraged the establishment of a state commission to regulate railroads, dealt with the matter of juvenile delinquency, and led the effort to establish the state Board of Health and the state Fish Commission. Bagley, a Unitarian, was an enthusiastic supporter of prohibition and passed the liquor-tax law.

== Retirement and death ==
Bagley died in San Francisco from tuberculosis, three days after his 49th birthday. He was interred in Woodmere Cemetery of Detroit.

In 2019, his once believed to be lost statue was discovered in storage at the Detroit Institute of Arts.

== Bibliography ==
- "Bagley, John Judson". The Biographical Dictionary of America. Vol. 1. 1906. pp. 181–182.
- Profile, National Governor's Association website. Accessed March 28, 2024.
- Profile, PoliticalGraveyard.com. Accessed March 28, 2024.
- Memorial Library
- Bingham, Stephen D. (2005) [1888]. "s.v. John J. Bagley". Early history of Michigan, with biographies of state officers, members of Congress, judges and legislators. Pub. pursuant to act 59, 1887. Ann Arbor, Mich.: University of Michigan Library. pp. 55–56.

Party political offices
Preceded by William Alanson Howard	Chairman of the Michigan Republican Party; 1868– 1870	Succeeded by Stephen D. Bingham
Preceded by Henry P. Baldwin	Republican nominee for Governor of Michigan; 1872, 1874	Succeeded by Charles Croswell
Political offices
Preceded by Henry P. Baldwin	Governor of Michigan; 1873–1877	Succeeded by Charles Croswell
