= Henry P. Baldwin =

American politician

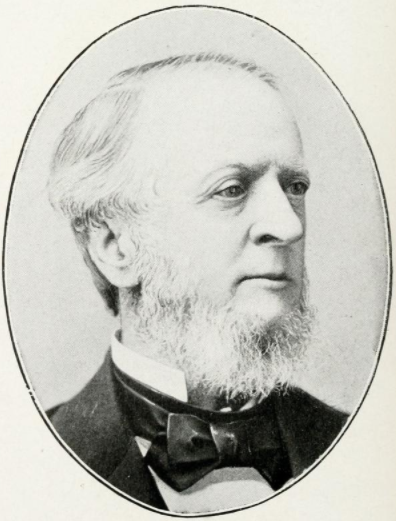

15th Governor of Michigan
- In office January 6, 1869 – January 1, 1873
- Lieutenant: Morgan Bates
- Preceded by: Henry H. Crapo
- Succeeded by: John J. Bagley

United States Senator from Michigan
- In office November 17, 1879 – March 3, 1881
- Preceded by: Zachariah Chandler
- Succeeded by: Omar D. Conger

Member of the Michigan Senate from the 2nd district
- In office 1861–1862

Personal details
- Born: February 22, 1814 Coventry, Rhode Island
- Died: December 31, 1892 (aged 78) Detroit, Michigan
- Party: Republican
- Spouses: Harriet M. Day (m. 1835; died 1865) Sibyle Lambard (m. 1866)

Henry Porter Baldwin (February 22, 1814 – December 31, 1892), a descendant of pilgrim father Nathaniel Baldwin, was the 15th governor of Michigan and U.S. Senator from the state of Michigan.

== Early life in Rhode Island ==
Baldwin was born to John and Margaret (Williams) Baldwin in Coventry, Rhode Island, and attended the common schools. He worked as a store clerk in Pawtucket from age 12 to age 20, after which he engaged in his own business for several years in Woonsocket. In 1835, he married Harriet M. Day (deceased 1862). He married his second wife, Sibyle Lambard, in 1866, who survived him. He is also 3rd cousins once removed with Abraham Baldwin, a signer of the Constitution.

== Life and politics in Michigan ==
Baldwin moved to Detroit, Michigan, where he established a wholesale business in boots and shoes in 1838. He was a member of the convention which organized the U.S. Republican Party in Jackson, Michigan, in 1854. He was influential in organizing the sixth Episcopal parish in the northern outskirts of Detroit on December 27, 1858, and in building St. John's Episcopal Church for the parish. Baldwin donated the church lot and underwrote a large portion of the cost of building a chapel to seat 125 persons (completed November 1859) and paid for the construction of the rectory. He also contributed in large part to the building of the larger 1,300-seat nave, completed in 1861. He was the Senior Warden from the parish's founding until his death.

He was director of the Michigan State Bank and president of the Second National Bank of Detroit, 1863–1887. For several years, he was also the director of the Eastern Asylum in Pontiac. He was a member of the Michigan State Senate, 2nd District, 1861–1862. He married his second wife, Sibyle Lambard, a great-granddaughter of Martha Ballard, on November 21, 1866.

In 1868, Baldwin was elected Governor of Michigan, serving from 1869 to 1873. He was appointed and subsequently elected as a Republican to the United States Senate to fill the vacancy caused by the death of Zachariah Chandler, serving from November 17, 1879, to March 3, 1881, alongside Thomas W. Ferry. He became Chairman of the Michigan Republican Party from 1880 to 1882. The village of Baldwin, Michigan, was named for him during his time as governor.

== Retirement and death ==
Baldwin was not a candidate for reelection to the Senate and resumed his former business pursuits, serving as president of the Detroit National Bank, 1883–1887. He died in Detroit on December 31, 1892, and is interred in Elmwood Cemetery.

Political offices
Preceded by Henry H. Crapo	Governor of Michigan; 1869–1873	Succeeded by John J. Bagley
U.S. Senate
Preceded by Zachariah Chandler	U.S. senator (Class 1) from Michigan; 1879–1881; Served alongside: Thomas W. Ferry	Succeeded by Omar D. Conger
Party political offices
Preceded by Henry H. Crapo	Republican nominee for Governor of Michigan; 1868, 1870	Succeeded by John J. Bagley
Preceded by James McMillan	Chairman of the Michigan Republican Party; 1880–1882	Succeeded by Edward S. Lacey
