= Charles E. Stuart House =

- U.S. National Register of Historic Places
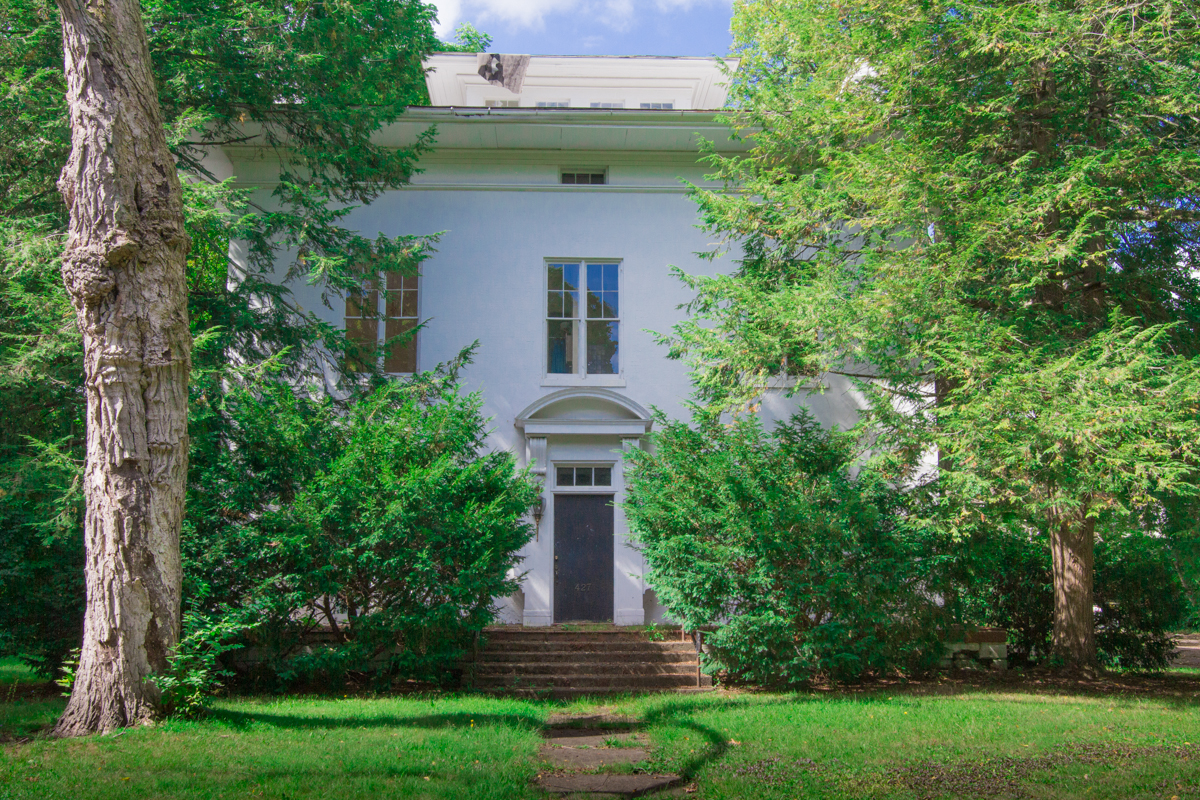

- Location within Michigan Location within the United States
- Interactive map showing the location of Charles E. Stuart House
- Location: 427 Stuart Ave., Kalamazoo, Michigan
- Coordinates: 42°17′43″N 85°35′53″W
- Area: less than one acre
- Built: 1858
- Architectural style: Italian Villa
- NRHP reference No.: 72000625
- Added to NRHP: March 16, 1972

The Charles E. Stuart House is a single-family home located at 427 Stuart Avenue in Kalamazoo, Michigan. It was listed on the National Register of Historic Places in 1972.

== History ==
Charles E. Stuart was born in New York State, and was admitted to the bar there. Shortly thereafter, in 1835, he moved to Kalamazoo and built up an extensive law practice. He was elected to the United States House of Representatives in 1847, and was re-elected twice before moving on to a seat in the United States Senate in 1853. He was the Democratic candidate for governor in 1858, but lost the election to Moses Wisner.

At about the same time, Stuart built this house for his personal residence in Kalamazoo; he lived there with his wife and adult children. When the Civil War arose, Stuart raised and equipped the 13th Michigan Infantry, but was forced to resign due to ill health. He continued to practice law for a few years, but lingering health issues forced him to retire. He lived in this house until 1883, when he moved into a smaller house. Stuart died in 1887.

When the Stuarts moved in 1883, the house was sold to Samuel Browne, a local horseman. In 1904, it was purchased by Charles Hayes, a local real estate speculator. In 1924, prominent attorney Harry C. Howard purchased the house; Howard lived there until his death in 1946. It was later purchased by a Western Michigan University fraternity, Tau Kappa Epsilon, before being returned to private use.

== Description ==
The Charles E. Stuart House is a 2 1/2-story Italian villa, clad with stucco marked to resemble stone. The house is topped with a cupola. The interior contains imported Italian marble fireplaces, mahogany paneled walls, a third floor ballroom, and the first indoor bathroom in Kalamazoo.
