= Joseph S. Keen =

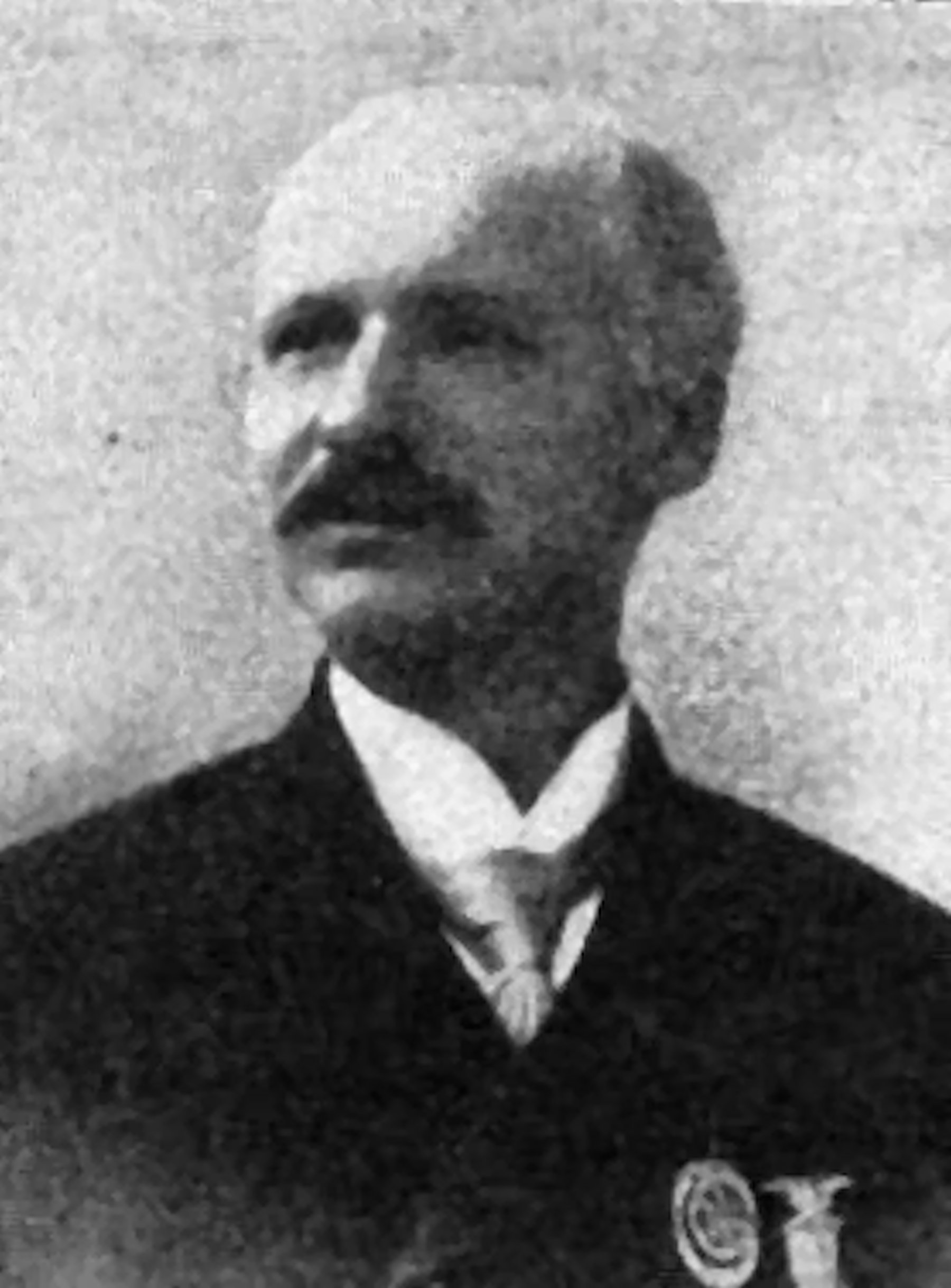
Joseph S. Keen, c. 1895

Joseph S. Keen (July 24, 1843 - December 3, 1926) was a Guernsey-born soldier and recipient of the Medal of Honor for actions during the American Civil War.

== Biography ==
Keen was born in Vale, Guernsey on July 24, 1843. He moved to America some time before the start of the American Civil War. He started as a private but eventually obtained the rank of sergeant in Company D of the 13th Michigan Volunteer Infantry Regiment. Keen was captured by the Confederates on September 20, 1863, following the Battle of Chickamauga. He was held in multiple prisons including Andersonville until he escaped in Macon, Georgia on September 10, 1864. He earned his medal in action near Chattahoochee River, Georgia on October 1, 1864. His medal was issued on August 4, 1899. Keen died on December 3, 1926, in Detroit, Michigan where he was buried in Elmwood Cemetery.

== Medal of Honor citation ==
For extraordinary heroism on 1 October 1864, in action at Chattahoochee River, Georgia. While an escaped prisoner of war within the enemy's lines, Sergeant Keen witnessed an important movement of the enemy, and at great personal risk made his way through the enemy's lines and brought news of the movement to Sherman's army.
