= Pine Grove Historical Museum =

Museum

- Location: 405 Cesar Chavez Avenue; Pontiac, Michigan, US
- Coordinates: 42.647830°N 83.304820°W
- Type: Historic house
- Owner: Oakland County Historical Society
- Website: www.ocphs.org

The Pine Grove Historical Museum is located in Pontiac, Michigan and operated by the Oakland County Historical Society. The museum features the home of former Michigan Governor Moses Wisner. The four acre-plus property also includes several outbuildings, including a summer kitchen, a smokehouse and a root cellar.

The property includes a late 19th-century period one-room schoolhouse, and a former carriage house that is home to the Pioneer Museum and the Research Library.

== Moses Wisner ==
The Moses Wisner House is listed on the National Register of Historic Places. In 1845, Moses Wisner moved to Oakland County, Michigan from New York with his family, They settled on a piece of land along the old Saginaw Trail.

Although Wisner was a lawyer, he had a passion for farming, so he bought enough land for chickens and cattle, and for fruit trees and growing vegetables.

In 1858, Wisner was elected governor of Michigan. Since there was no governor's mansion in Lansing, Wisner remodeled his Greek Revival-Style home to accommodate his responsibilities as governor.

Rather than running for re-election for governor, Wisner organized a volunteer infantry regiment to fight in the U.S. Civil War, and in 1862 the 22nd Michigan Infantry left for Kentucky with Colonel Wisner in command. Before leaving, Wisner transferred ownership of the Pine Grove property to his wife, Angeolina.

== Pine Grove ==
The grounds of Wisner's mansion included a large grove of pine trees, so Wisner named the property "Pine Grove."

== Pioneer Museum ==
Located in the carriage house is the Pioneer Museum, which features a collection of hand-made tools and farm implements from the late 1800s.

== Drayton Plains School ==
In 1865, the Drayton Plains one-room schoolhouse was built at Monroe Road and Sashabaw Road in Drayton Plains, Michigan. The schoolhouse closed in 1920.

In 1965, the schoolhouse was donated to the Oakland County Pioneer and Historical Society by Leonard Coates, and moved to Pine Grove. It was restored to its late 1800s-era condition and now reflects the school in its original state, including school benches, a wood-burning stove and textbooks from 1860 to 1890.

== Research library ==
The research library is located in the carriage house and contains many historical resources, including books, city directories, cemetery records, newspapers, and other local historical reference materials.
