= Charles E. Stuart =

American politician

Charles Edward Stuart
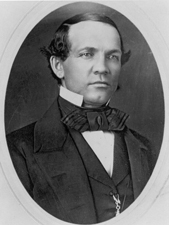

President pro tempore of the United States Senate
- In office June 9, 1856 – June 10, 1856
- Preceded by: Jesse D. Bright
- Succeeded by: Jesse D. Bright

United States Senator from Michigan
- In office March 4, 1853 – March 3, 1859
- Preceded by: Alpheus Felch
- Succeeded by: Kinsley S. Bingham

Member of the U.S. House of Representatives from Michigan's 2nd district
- In office March 4, 1851 – March 3, 1853
- Preceded by: William Sprague
- Succeeded by: David A. Noble
- In office December 6, 1847 – March 3, 1849
- Preceded by: Edward Bradley
- Succeeded by: William Sprague

Member of the Michigan Senate
- In office 1842

Personal details
- Born: November 25, 1810 Waterloo, New York, US
- Died: May 19, 1887 (aged 76) Kalamazoo, Michigan, US
- Party: Democratic
- Profession: Politician, Lawyer

Military service
- Allegiance: United States
- Branch/service: (United States) Union Army
- Rank: Colonel
- Unit: 13th Michigan Infantry
- Battles/wars: American Civil War

Charles Edward Stuart (November 25, 1810 – May 19, 1887) was a U.S. representative and U.S. senator from the state of Michigan.

== Biography ==
Stuart was born in New York, either near Waterloo, New York, or in Columbia County. He studied law, was admitted to the bar in 1832, and commenced practice in Waterloo. He moved to Michigan in 1835 and settled in Portage, Michigan.

Stuart was a member of the state house of representatives in 1842 and was elected as a Democrat from Michigan's 2nd congressional district to the 30th Congress to fill the vacancy caused by the death of Edward Bradley. He served in the U.S.House from December 6, 1847, to March 4, 1849, and was defeated for reelection in 1848 by William Sprague. Two years later, he defeated Sprague by being elected to the 32nd Congress, serving from March 4, 1851, to March 3, 1853. He served as chairman of the Committee on Expenditures in the Department of State in the 32nd Congress.

Stuart was elected to the U.S. Senate in 1852 and served in the 33rd, 34th, and 35th Congresses from March 4, 1853, to March 3, 1859. He very briefly was the President pro tempore of the Senate during the 34th Congress, but chairman of the Committee on Public Lands for the 34th and 35th Congresses. He did not seek reelection to the Senate but was an unsuccessful candidate for Governor of Michigan in 1858. He resumed the practice of law in Kalamazoo and was a delegate to the 1860 Democratic National Convention from Michigan.

During the Civil War, Stuart raised and equipped the 13th Michigan Infantry, of which he was commissioned colonel. He later resigned due to ill health.

Charles E. Stuart died in Kalamazoo and was interred in Mountain Home Cemetery. His home in Kalamazoo at 427 Stuart Ave. is listed on the National Register of Historic Places. The surrounding Stuart Area Historic District is also listed.

== See also ==
Party political offices
Preceded by Alpheus Felch	Democratic nominee for Governor of Michigan; 1858	Succeeded by John S. Barry
U.S. House of Representatives
Preceded by Edward Bradley	Member of the U.S. House of Representatives from Michigan's 2nd congressional district December 6, 1847 – March 4, 1849	Succeeded by William Sprague
Preceded by William Sprague	Member of the U.S. House of Representatives from Michigan's 2nd congressional district March 4, 1851 – March 4, 1853	Succeeded by David A. Noble
U.S. Senate
Preceded by Alpheus Felch	U.S. senator (Class 2) from Michigan; March 4, 1853 – March 4, 1859; Served alongside: Lewis Cass and Zachariah Chandler	Succeeded by Kinsley S. Bingham
Political offices
Preceded by Jesse D. Bright	President pro tempore of the United States Senate; June 9, 1856 – June 10, 1856	Succeeded by Jesse D. Bright
