= 1858 Michigan gubernatorial election =

- November 2, 1858
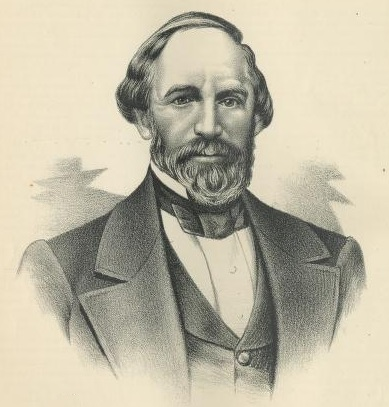

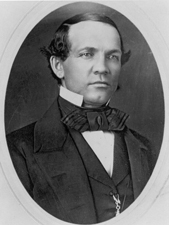
Nominee	Moses Wisner	Charles E. Stuart
Party	Republican	Democratic
Popular vote	65,202	56,067
Percentage	53.70%	46.18%
- County results Wisner: 50–60% 60–70% 80–90% Stuart: 50–60% 60–70% 70–80% 80–90% 90–100% No Data/Votes
Governor before election
Kinsley S. Bingham
Republican
Elected Governor
Moses Wisner
Republican

The 1858 Michigan gubernatorial election was held on November 2, 1858. Republican nominee Moses Wisner defeated Democratic nominee Charles E. Stuart with 53.70% of the vote.

== General election ==
=== Candidates ===
Major party candidates

- Moses Wisner, Republican
- Charles E. Stuart, Democratic

=== Results ===
1858 Michigan gubernatorial election
Party	Candidate	Votes	%	±%
Republican	Moses Wisner	65,202	53.70%	−3.17%
Democratic	Charles E. Stuart	56,067	46.18%	+3.10%
	Scattering	110	0.09%	
	Imperfect (Note: These are ballots that were intended for the main candidates but contained misspellings. The canvass does not list specific variations, it just groups these votes together.)	36	0.03%	
Majority		9,135	7.52%	
Total votes		121,415	100.00%	
Republican hold		Swing	-6.27%	

==== Results by county ====
Oceana County would not vote Democratic again until 1890. Genesee County would not vote for the losing candidate again until 1942.

County	Moses Wisner Republican		Charles E. Stuart Democratic		Scattering & Imperfect		Margin		Total votes cast
County	#	%	#	%	#	%	#	%	Total votes cast
Allegan	1,275	50.90%	1,229	49.06%	1	0.04%	46	1.84%	2,505
Alpena	20	57.14%	15	42.86%	0	0.00%	5	14.29%	35
Allegan	1,310	55.20%	1,063	44.80%	0	0.00%	247	10.41%	2,373
Bay	140	34.15%	270	65.85%	0	0.00%	-130	-31.71%	410
Berrien	1,973	50.05%	1,969	49.95%	0	0.00%	4	0.10%	3,942
Branch	2,223	64.57%	1,216	35.32%	4	0.12%	1,007	29.25%	3,443
Calhoun	3,086	59.38%	2,111	40.62%	0	0.00%	975	18.76%	5,197
Cass	1,638	53.99%	1,394	45.95%	2	0.07%	244	8.04%	3,034
Cheboygan	0	0.00%	79	100.00%	0	0.00%	-79	-100.00%	79
Chippewa	44	53.01%	39	46.99%	0	0.00%	5	6.02%	83
Clinton	1,231	52.97%	1,092	46.99%	1	0.04%	139	5.98%	2,324
Eaton	1,602	56.95%	1,211	43.05%	0	0.00%	391	13.90%	2,813
Emmet	0	0.00%	132	100.00%	0	0.00%	-132	-100.00%	132
Genesee	1,509	46.56%	1,702	52.51%	30	0.93%	-193	-5.95%	3,241
Grand Traverse	209	45.93%	246	54.07%	0	0.00%	-37	-8.13%	455
Gratiot	360	65.10%	192	34.72%	1	0.18%	168	30.38%	553
Hillsdale	2,879	66.78%	1,431	33.19%	1	0.02%	1,448	33.59%	4,311
Houghton	46	29.49%	110	70.51%	0	0.00%	-64	-41.03%	156
Ingham	1,917	53.34%	1,677	46.66%	0	0.00%	240	6.68%	3,594
Ionia	1,873	61.53%	1,149	37.75%	22	0.72%	724	23.78%	3,044
Iosco	18	29.51%	43	70.49%	0	0.00%	-25	-40.98%	61
Jackson	2,752	54.94%	2,254	45.00%	3	0.06%	498	9.94%	5,009
Kalamazoo	2,475	60.98%	1,582	38.98%	2	0.05%	893	22.00%	4,059
Kent	3,112	52.50%	2,813	47.45%	3	0.05%	299	5.04%	5,928
Lapeer	1,251	55.70%	995	44.30%	0	0.00%	256	11.40%	2,246
Lenawee	4,023	58.64%	2,837	41.36%	0	0.00%	1,186	17.29%	6,860
Livingston	1,740	48.27%	1,865	51.73%	0	0.00%	-125	-3.47%	3,605
Mackinac	18	13.24%	118	86.76%	0	0.00%	-100	-73.53%	136
Macomb	1,791	52.37%	1,629	47.63%	0	0.00%	162	4.74%	3,420
Manistee	9	25.71%	26	74.29%	0	0.00%	-17	-48.57%	35
Manitou	14	16.87%	69	83.13%	0	0.00%	-55	-66.27%	83
Marquette	169	65.25%	90	34.75%	0	0.00%	79	30.50%	259
Mason	72	64.86%	39	35.14%	0	0.00%	33	29.73%	111
Midland	247	81.79%	55	18.21%	0	0.00%	192	63.58%	302
Monroe	1,790	51.11%	1,712	48.89%	0	0.00%	78	2.23%	3,502
Montcalm	454	59.50%	309	40.50%	0	0.00%	145	19.00%	763
Newaygo	369	60.79%	238	39.21%	0	0.00%	131	21.58%	607
Oakland	3,403	50.45%	3,337	49.47%	5	0.07%	66	0.98%	6,745
Oceana	68	28.94%	167	71.06%	0	0.00%	-99	-42.13%	235
Ontonagon	119	51.97%	109	47.60%	1	0.44%	10	4.37%	229
Ottawa	1,091	47.70%	1,195	52.25%	1	0.04%	-104	-4.55%	2,287
Saginaw	789	42.33%	1,069	57.35%	6	0.32%	-280	-15.02%	1,864
Sanilac	700	69.86%	301	30.04%	1	0.10%	399	39.82%	1,002
Shiawassee	1,137	52.23%	1,040	47.77%	0	0.00%	97	4.46%	2,177
St. Clair	1,732	51.24%	1,647	48.73%	1	0.03%	85	2.51%	3,380
St. Joseph	2,108	56.62%	1,613	43.33%	2	0.05%	495	13.30%	3,723
Tuscola	439	58.69%	308	41.18%	1	0.13%	131	17.51%	748
Van Buren	1,559	56.88%	1,180	43.05%	2	0.07%	379	13.83%	2,741
Washtenaw	3,313	52.52%	2,993	47.45%	2	0.03%	320	5.07%	6,308
Wayne	5,105	45.31%	6,107	54.21%	54	0.48%	-1,002	-8.89%	11,266
Total	65,202	53.70%	56,067	46.18%	146	0.12%	9,135	7.52%	121,415

===== Counties that flipped from Democratic to Republican =====
- Marquette

===== Counties that flipped from Republican to Democratic =====
- Genesee
- Oceana
- Ottawa
