= John Smith Chipman =

American politician (1800–1869)

Member of the U.S. House of Representatives from Michigan's 2nd district
- In office March 4, 1845 – March 3, 1847
- Preceded by: Lucius Lyon
- Succeeded by: Edward Bradley

Personal details
- Born: August 10, 1800 Shoreham, Vermont
- Died: July 27, 1869 (aged 68) San Jose, California
- Resting place: Oak Hill Memorial Park; San Jose, California
- Party: Democratic

John Smith Chipman (August 10, 1800 – July 27, 1869) was a lawyer and politician from the U.S. state of Michigan.

Chipman was born in Shoreham, Vermont, a son of Barnabas and Polly (Smith) Chipman. He attended the rural schools and graduated from Middlebury College in 1823. He studied law, was admitted to the bar, and practiced in Addison County, Vermont, and Essex County, New York.

In 1838, he moved to Centreville in St. Joseph County, Michigan, where he held several local offices including serving as a member of the Michigan State House of Representatives in 1842. Chipman was elected as a Democrat from Michigan's 2nd District to the Twenty-ninth Congress, serving from March 4, 1845, to March 3, 1847. After the end of his term, he moved to Niles in Berrien County, Michigan, and later, in 1850, he moved to San Francisco, California, where he resumed the practice of law. He moved to San Jose, California, in 1869 and lived in retirement there until his death. He is interred in Oak Hill Cemetery in San Jose.

He was regarded as a brilliant lawyer and a natural orator. Bingham writes that "listening to one of his speeches was like reading one of Cooper's novels." He was over six feet tall with black hair and a dark complexion, giving rise to his nickname, Black Chip.

== Family ==
In October 1824, Chipman married Frances Larabee. They were the parents of William H. Chipman and Frances C. Chipman.

U.S. House of Representatives
Preceded by Lucius Lyon	United States Representative for the 2nd congressional district of Michigan; 1845–1847	Succeeded by Edward Bradley
