= Robert Henry Hendershot =

American soldier (died 1925)

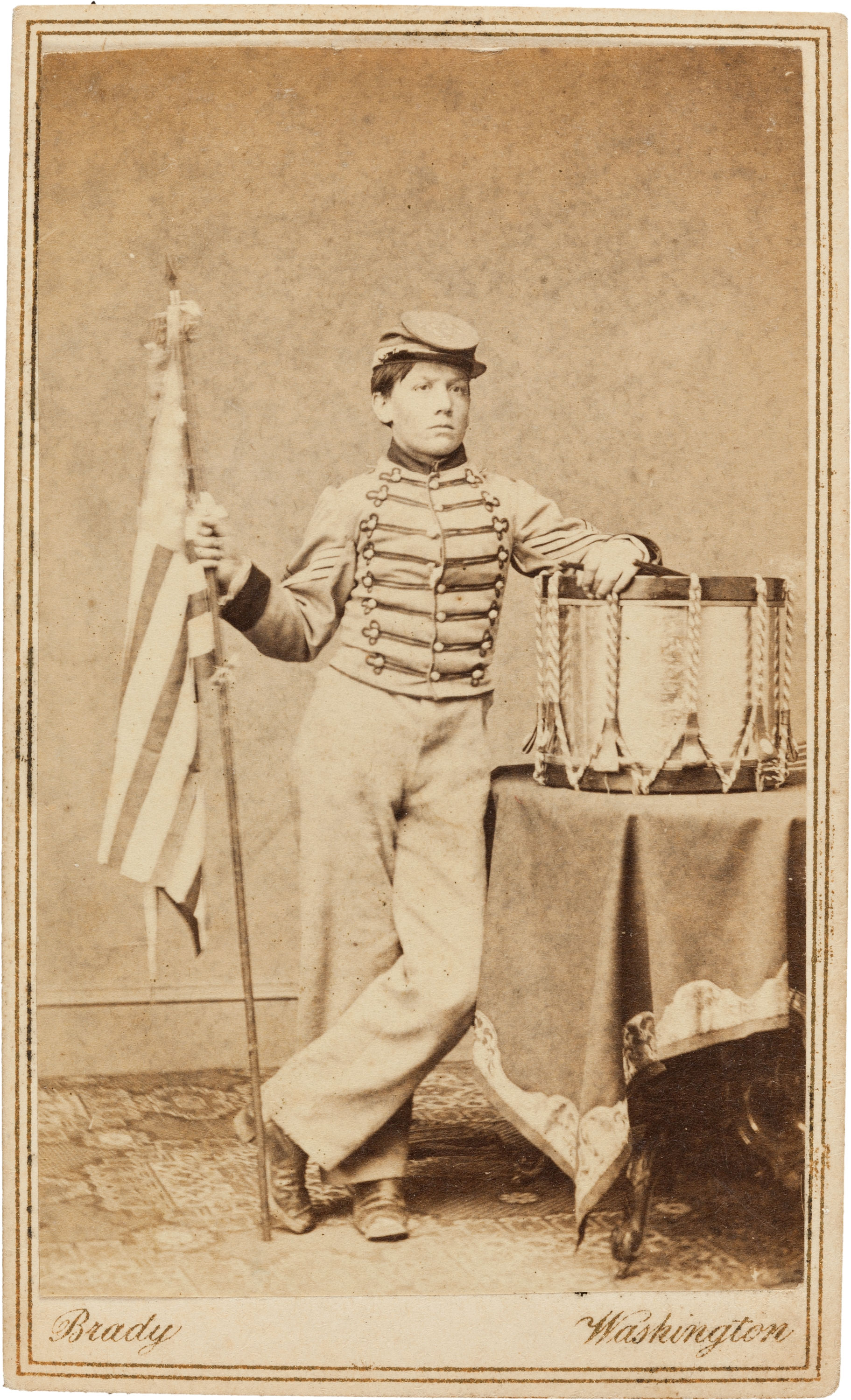
Carte de visite of Hendershot by Mathew Brady

Robert Henry Hendershot (died December 26 1925), known as the Drummer Boy of the Rappahannock, was an American Civil War drummer boy known for his reputed heroics at the Battle of Fredericksburg, Virginia, in December 1862.

== Biography ==
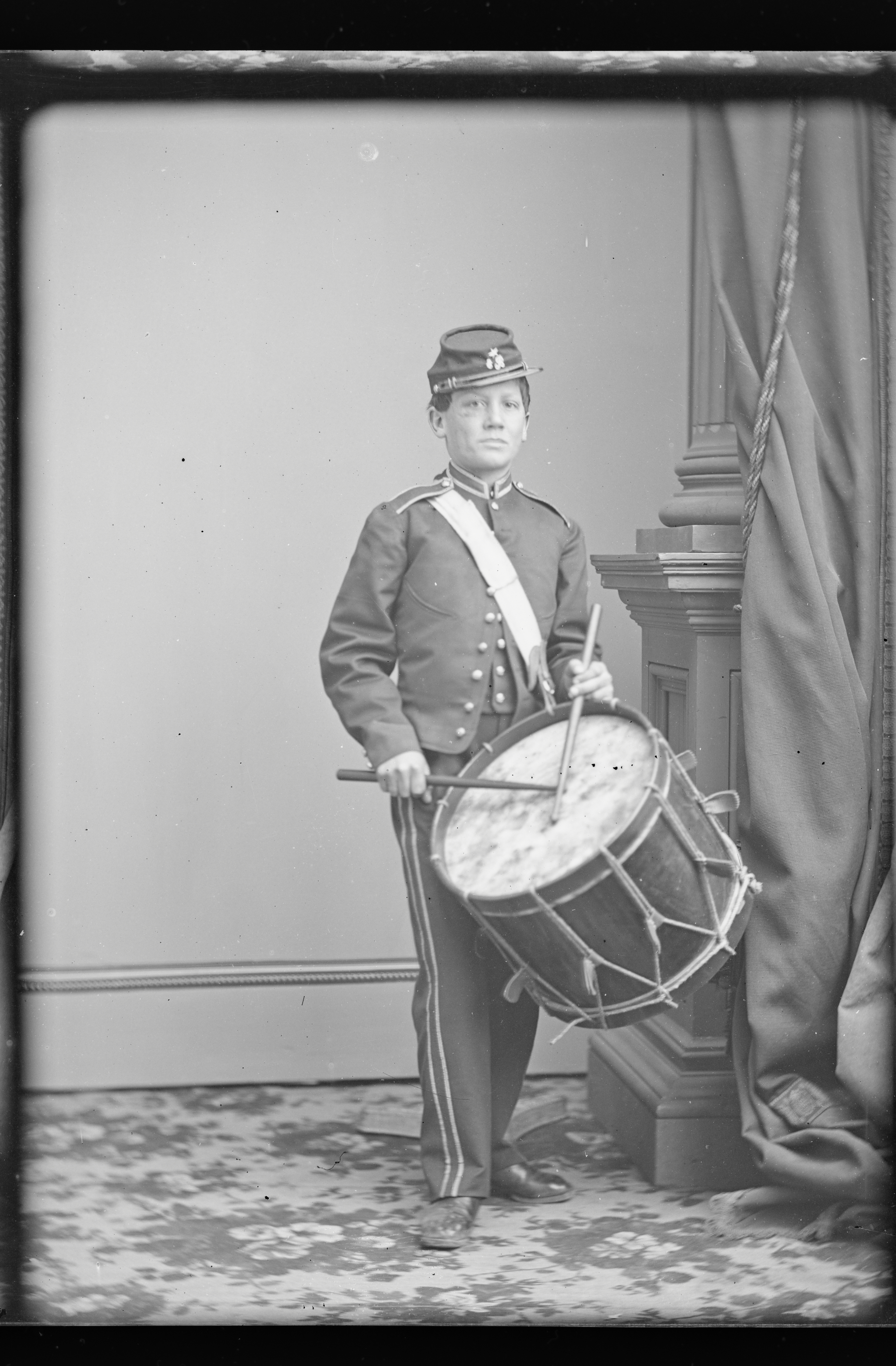
Hendershot c. 1860s-1870s

Hendershot was born somewhere between 1847 and 1851 in either New York or Michigan. In 1861 he was living with his widowed mother in Jackson, Michigan. That fall he began drilling with the Jackson County Rifles, a local volunteer unit. He accompanied them to Fort Wayne, outside Detroit, where the unit became Company C of the 9th Michigan Infantry. Hendershot did not enlist at this time, but accompanied the regiment to its first encampment at West Point, Kentucky, either as a stowaway or as a servant to Captain Charles V. DeLand, the company commander and erstwhile publisher of the Jackson American Citizen. Hendershot remained with Company C until March 1862, when he enlisted as a musician in Company B.

He was with Company B at the Murfreesboro, Tennessee courthouse when it was attacked by a Confederate cavalry brigade under command of Brigadier General Nathan Bedford Forrest on July 13, 1862, at the First Battle of Murfreesboro. Hendershot was captured with the rest of his regiment and paroled with the enlisted men. Shortly thereafter he was discharged for disability; he suffered frequent and severe epileptic seizures, an affliction he had endured since early childhood. Although this alone should have precluded any further military service, "an oath of honor" also obliged Hendershot "not to take up arms against the Confederacy until regularly exchanged." In spite of this, in early September, Hendershot appeared at a Detroit recruiting office and enlisted in the 8th Michigan Infantry Regiment. Because of his parole, he signed on with an alias, "Robert Henry Henderson." His critics later called this despicable, while others said it had been a common practice. (Note: How members of the 9th Michigan Infantry reacted when ordered to take up arms while still paroled shows how seriously most soldiers considered this oath.) Hendershot claimed he had done so at the urging of the recruiter, Lieutenant Michael Hogan, retained him as his personal servant and aide for the next two months. When Chaplain George Taylor arrived from Ann Arbor, he developed a fondness for Hendershot and gained permission to have him placed under his "special care."

The two traveled south to Taylor's assigned unit, the 8th Michigan Infantry. At the Washington depot Taylor rescued Hendershot when he suffered a seizure and fell in front of a locomotive. He suffered another seizure a few days later, while standing at dress parade. Hendershot then confessed to Taylor of his discharge from the 9th Infantry and his use of an alias. Hendershot began to have such frequent seizures that the acting regimental commander, Major Ralph Ely, ordered him off-duty and applied for his discharge. (Note: Ely notes Taylor's arrival, his own inspection of the camp and review of the troops, but does not mention Hendershot.)

Hendershot awaited discharge through the closing months of 1862. Freed of his military duties, he explored the Union encampment that contained the Army of the Potomac. The Army was waiting on the banks of the Rappahannock River, opposite the lightly defended city of Fredericksburg, Virginia, while bridges were built across the river. The delay enabled General Robert E. Lee to move his army into position. When the engineers arrived, they came under attack from rebel sharpshooters, so on 11 December 1862 the 7th Michigan Infantry volunteered to cross the river under enemy fire and drive the rebel sharpshooters from their nests.

Hendershot's wanderings had taken him to the riverbank that morning. He later claimed he helped push off the first boat and slipped when he tried to climb aboard, and made the voyage across clinging to the gunwale. A dispatch from the scene describes "a drummer boy, only 13 years old, who volunteered and went over in the first boat, and returned laden with curiosities picked up while there." A correspondent for the Detroit Advertiser and Tribune wrote that the boy belonged to the 8th Michigan Infantry. (Note: Captain Amos Steele of the 7th Michigan Infantry provided a detailed description of the crossing, which was published in the Ingham County News, but it made no mention of a drummer boy. His report also included a list of those who crossed in the boats. Hendershot's name was not on it.)

Reports of the episode appeared in the press. The young hero remained nameless until late December, when Hendershot visited the offices of the Detroit Free Press and Detroit Advertiser and Tribune, claiming to be the "Drummer Boy of the Rappahannock." Hendershot's story was repeated in national papers, including the New-York Tribune. Its publisher, Horace Greeley, presented Hendershot with a silver drum. For the next eight weeks Hendershot performed at the P. T. Barnum museum, and then spent a few weeks more in Poughkeepsie, New York, at the Eastman Business College, which had rewarded his heroism with a scholarship.

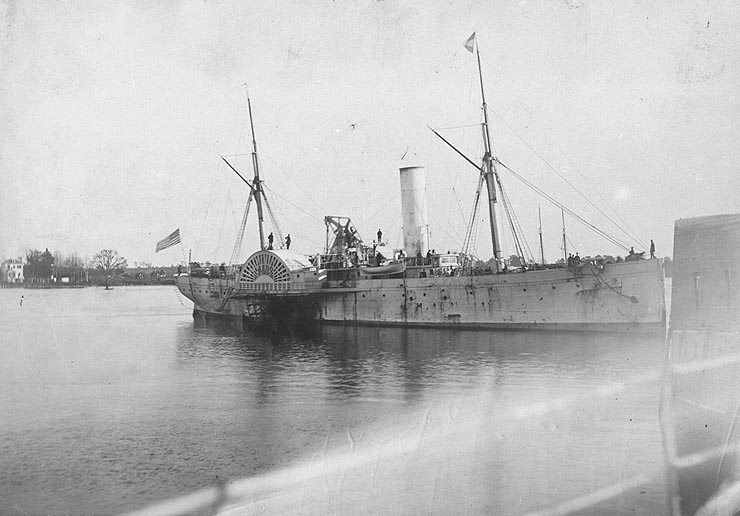
The USS Fort Jackson

Hendershot was discharged from the 8th Michigan Infantry, for epilepsy, on 27 December 1862. In April 1864 he left Poughkeepsie and enlisted as a first class boy aboard the U.S.S. Fort Jackson at Hampton Roads, Virginia. From his naval service arose the story that he was a member of a shore party that destroyed a salt works near Fort Fisher. Only Hendershot's biographers offer evidence that Hendershot took part in the raid. He fell overboard while in a seizure and would have drowned had it not been for a watchful shipmate, Seaman Henry Harkins. Hendershot claimed that this incident prompted his discharge upon the ship's return to Norfolk on 26 June 1864. The ship's log listed him as a deserter.

Hendershot claimed that he spent the next few months on a grand tour of England, in service as a page with the Treasury Department, and on dangerous missions for General Grant as a spy operating behind enemy lines. By the end of the war Hendershot had collected a portfolio of endorsements from Generals Burnside, Meade, Logan, Parkhurst and others, recommending him for an appointment to West Point. The last endorsement came from President Lincoln, who wrote "I know of this boy, and believe he is very brave, manly and worthy." Hendershot claimed he had been denied admission to the Academy because of his wounds, or because of his inability to pass the entrance exams; however, no application exists in War Department records. (Note: The Dodge and Gerry biographies contain the only evidence of Hendershot's activities between June 1864 and August 1865.)

== Post war ==
After the war Hendershot returned to Poughkeepsie Business College for a brief time, marrying a fellow student. In 1867 he collaborated with writer William Sumner Dodge, who produced a 200-page biography, Robert Henry Hendershot; or the Brave Drummer Boy of the Rappahannock.

For the next two decades Hendershot worked for the Union Pacific Railroad in Omaha, Nebraska, and then as a federal mail clerk for the Michigan Lake Shore Railroad in Chicago, Illinois.

After his retirement as mail clerk in 1885, Hendershot took out his drum and began touring the country with his son, Cleveland, who played the fife. Although they principally performed at Grand Army of the Republic (GAR) functions and other patriotic gatherings, their tour also took them to Canada and the Kingdom of Hawaii, where they entertained Queen Lill'uokalani.

In July 1891 Hendershot posted a letter to the GAR newspaper, the National Tribune, restating his claim to the title "Drummer Boy of the Rappahannock," as well as that of "youngest soldier". He was by then one of the best known veteran drummer boys in the country. As such, he was invited to lead the Michigan Department during the GAR parade at the organization's annual national encampment, held in Detroit the first week of August.

There were old soldiers who were not pleased by the fame and honors Hendershot enjoyed. One of them was the Seventh Michigan's former drum major, Wilbur F. Dickerson of Grand Rapids, Michigan. In a letter to the encampment's organizers, Dickerson pronounced Hendershot a fake, and asked them to remove him from his place of honor. In other letters Dickerson asked members of the Seventh Michigan to help him spearhead an attack to discredit Hendershot.

Hendershot kept his place of honor in the parade, but during the next few days the GAR hierarchy, following the lead of veterans of the 7th and 8th Michigan Infantries, pronounced Hendershot a fraud and stripped him of his title, which was then awarded to John T. Spillaine, a Detroit policeman and former Seventh Michigan drummer boy. Several months later a number of Detroit citizens awarded Spillaine a gold medal, two inches in diameter, upon which was a raised figure of a drummer boy and the inscription "Drummer Boy of the Rappahannock." Spillaine readily accepted the title and proudly wore the medal for the rest of his life. Spillaine used the title as a springboard to commandership of the Michigan Department of the GAR in 1912. He appears with the medal in his official GAR portrait, and maintained a scrapbook of newspaper articles related to the Drummer Boy of the Rappahannock until his death.

Hendershot immediately mounted an appeal in the local press; however, the newspapers responded with rebuttals from Drum Major Dickerson and others. By the end of the conference Hendershot had been thoroughly discredited.

Throughout the encampment, the Reverend George Taylor had resisted those who wanted him to make a statement, lest it "disturb the harmony of the occasion, the success of which we were so anxious to promote." In a letter published in the Detroit Tribune on 13 August 1891, Taylor recounted the events of that day, and stated his "firm conviction" that Hendershot was "the individual who was known from the first as the 'Drummer Boy of the Rappahannock.'".

The controversy continued in the Detroit newspapers and in the National Tribune. A year later, at GAR's annual encampment at Washington, D.C., the membership reaffirmed Spillaine's right to the title of Drummer Boy of the Rappahannock. Spillaine, flanked by a guard of honor composed of members of the 7th Michigan Infantry, tapped the cadence for the Michigan Department as it marched up Pennsylvania Avenue. Hendershot did not attend the encampment, the National Tribune stated, "as it was clearly shown at the Detroit encampment that he was not entitled to this honor."

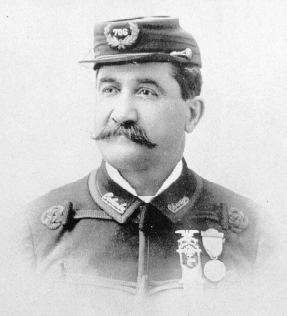
Robert H. Hendershot, about 1895, with GAR badges and "Drummer Boy" medal. Photograph from Gerry, H. E. Campfire Entertainment, 1903

During 1892 Hendershot traveled from coast to coast, visiting GAR posts and regimental reunions, winning back support of other old veterans. By the time of the national encampment of 1893, in Indianapolis, he had won his fight: the GAR reinstated his title and presented him with a diamond-studded solid gold medal inscribed "Robert H. Hendershot, Drummer Boy of the Rappahannock, from G.A.R. and W.R.C. comrades, Indianapolis, 1893." Soon after Hendershot strengthened his claim with another biography, Camp Fire Entertainment: The True Story of R. H. Hendershot, Drummer Boy of the Rappahannock. Although Spillaine also continued to claim the title and used it to gain commandership of the Michigan Department of the GAR in 1912, Hendershot apparently felt no further need to defend his title. He continued his career as a professional veteran drummer boy until at least 1914, when he performed during a reunion of the Iron Brigade, in Detroit, Michigan. Hendershot had one fight left, however.

== Pension claims and death ==
Hendershot had first filed for an invalid veteran's pension in 1890. The claim was based only on his service in the 9th Michigan Infantry. The Pension Bureau scheduled a medical examination for Hendershot, and three times he failed to appear. After that the Bureau moved his application to the inactive file. Hendershot let the matter rest for two more decades, while he and his son toured the country, entertaining at GAR gatherings and other patriotic functions.

Then, in 1912, he applied for a veteran's old age pension, based on his service in both the 8th and 9th Michigan Infantries. The Bureau could find no record of his service with the Eighth (probably due to his use of an alias), and requested additional information. Hendershot responded with an account of his naval service aboard the U.S.S. Fort Jackson. After checking with the Navy Department, which still listed Hendershot as a deserter-at-large, the Bureau summarily rejected his application. For the next ten years Hendershot gathered affidavits, hired lawyers, and exchanged letters with the Bureau, but failed to get the pension. In 1921 he modified his application, stating that he was an invalid, bedridden, suffering from Parkinson's disease, and in need of constant attention. Again, his naval service stood in the way. Finally, Hendershot appealed to Congress, which by a special act on 23 December 1924 granted him an old age pension of $50 per month. But Hendershot felt he was entitled to an invalid's pension of $72 per month. Another fight with the Pension Bureau ensued, but Hendershot died of pneumonia on 26 December 1925, without ever winning the pension.

== See also ==
- John Clem

== Sources ==
=== Manuscripts and newspapers ===
- Ann Arbor, MI. University of Michigan. Bentley Historical Library. John C. Love Letters, 1861–1864.
- Washington, D.C. National Archives. War Department.
  - Record Group 15. Pension Records, Robert Henry Hendershot.
  - Record Group 93. Service Records, Robert Henry Hendershot.
  - Abstract of Naval records, R. H. Hendershot.
- Chicago Daily Tribune, 1925.
- Detroit Advertiser & Tribune, 1861–1865, 1891–1893.
- Detroit Free Press, 1861–1865, 1891–1893.
- Detroit Journal, 1891–1893.
- Detroit Tribune, 1891–1892.
- Ingham (Michigan) County News, 1862–1863.
- National Tribune (GAR Newspaper), 1881–1912.

=== Books ===
- Bennett, Charles (1913). Historical Sketches of the Ninth Michigan Infantry. Coldwater, MI: Daily Courier.
- DeLand, Charles Victor (1903). DeLand's History of Jackson County, Michigan. Langsport, IN: B. F. Bowen.
- Dodge, William Sumner (1867). Robert Henry Hendershot, or the Brave Drummer Boy of the Rappahannock. Chicago: Church & Goodman.
- Ellis, Helen H (1965). Michigan in the War: A Guide to the Material in the Detroit Newspapers, 1861–1865. Lansing, MI: Michigan Civil War Centennial Observation Commission.
- Ely, Ralph (1965). With the Wandering Regiment: The Diary of Captain Ralph Ely of the Eighth Michigan Infantry. Mount Pleasant, MI: Central Michigan University Press.
- Gerry, H. E (1903). Campfire Entertainment: the True Story of R. H. Hendershot, Drummer Boy of the Rappahannock. Chicago: Hack & Anderson.
- Goodman, Susan E (2003). Robert Henry Hendershot: True Stories from America's Past. New York: Aladdin Paperbacks.
- Journal of the Annual Encampment, 1912. Lansing: Grand Army of the Republic, Department of Michigan. 1912.
- Keese, Dennis M (2001). Too Young To Die: Boy Soldiers of the Union Army 1861–1865. Huntington, WV: Blue Acorn Press.
- Lossing, Benson John (1874). The Pictorial Field Book of the Civil War in the United States of America. Hartford, CT: T. Belknap.
- Official Records of the Union and Confederate Navies in the War of the Rebellion (30 volumes). Washington: Government Printing Office. 1894–1922.
- Matthews, Monie (2008). Robert Hendershot: Youngest Civil War Soldier. Baltimore: Publish America.
- Ray, Delia (1991). Behind the Blue and Gray: The Soldier's Life in the Civil War. Outton: Lodestar Books.
- Record of Service of Michigan Volunteers in the Civil War. Kalamazoo, MI: Inling Bros. and Everard. 1903.
- John, Robinson, ed. (1880). Michigan in the War. Lansing: W. S. George & Co., State Printers.
- The War of the Rebellion: A Compilation of the Official Records of the Union and Confederate Armies (70 volumes). Washington: Government Printing Office. 1880–1901.

=== Articles ===
- Glesner, Anthony Patrick (January 2004). "Drummer Boy of the Rappahannock: Hero or Fraud?". America's Civil War. 16.
