= Wisner House =

- U.S. National Register of Historic Places
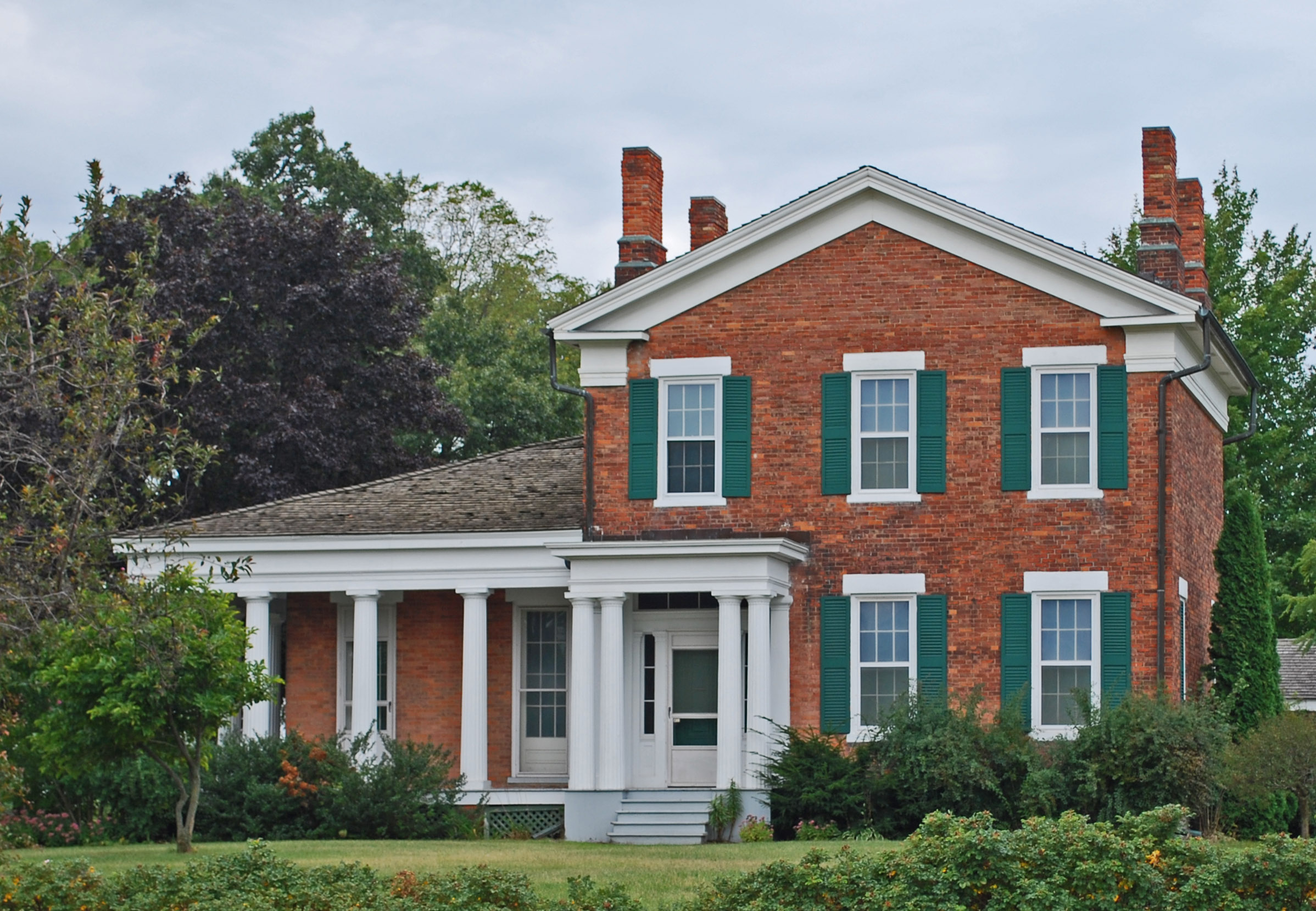
- Interactive map
- Location: 405 Cesar Chavez Ave., Pontiac, Michigan
- Coordinates: 42°38′54″N 83°18′17″W
- Area: 4 acres (1.6 ha)
- Built: 1845
- Architectural style: Greek Revival
- NRHP reference No.: 70000284
- Added to NRHP: July 8, 1970

The Wisner House, also known as Pine Grove, is a single-family house located at 405 Cesar Chavez Avenue in Pontiac, Michigan. It was listed on the National Register of Historic Places in 1970. It is now a public museum, the Governor Moses Wisner House, operated by the Oakland County Pioneer and Historical Society as part of the Pine Grove Historical Museum.

== History ==
Moses Wisner was born in New York State in 1815, and moved to Michigan in 1837. He began farming, but soon abandoned it to read law in his brother's law office in Pontiac. By 1844, Wisner had settled permanently in Pontiac, and in 1845 he contracted the building of this house. He was married three years later. As he began practicing law, Wisner became active in politics, and took part in the first Republican convention in 1854. In 1858, he ran for governor and was elected to a two-year term. At the outbreak of the Civil War, he raised a regiment; however, he died of typhoid fever in early 1863.

Wisner's widow Angeolina Wisner kept the house as it had been during his life. She resided there until her death in 1905. Afterward the house was owned and maintained by Wisner's daughter Jessie Wisner Clark, and then granddaughter Florence Clark Wallace. In 1945, Florence Clark Wallace sold the house to the Oakland County Pioneer and Historical Society as a house museum.

== Description ==
The Wisner House is a two-story red brick Greek Revival structure with a single story hip-roofed wing fronted with a colonnade of fluted Doric columns. The main entrance is covered by a flat-roofed portico. Windows are six over six units with sliding sashes, stone sills and stone lintels. The house still contains many objects which belonged to Moses Wisner and his immediate family.

== See also ==
- National Register of Historic Places listings in Oakland County, Michigan
