= John Clem =

US Army general (1851–1937)

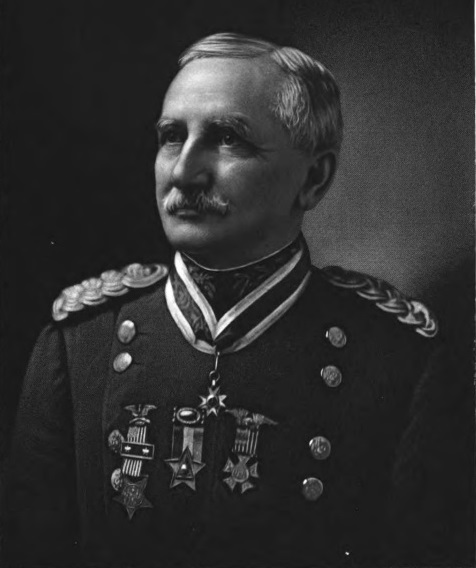
- From Volume III of 1916's A History of Texas and Texans
- Born: John Lincoln Clem; August 13, 1851; Newark, Ohio, U.S.
- Died: May 13, 1937 (aged 85); San Antonio, Texas, U.S.
- Burial place: Arlington National Cemetery
- Military career
- Allegiance: United States
- Branch: Union Army; United States Army
- Service years: 1863–1864; 1871–1915
- Rank: Major general
- Units: 22nd Michigan Infantry; 24th Infantry Regiment
- Conflicts: American Civil War; Battle of Chickamauga; Spanish–American War

John Lincoln Clem (nicknamed Johnny Shiloh; August 13, 1851 – May 13, 1937) was an American general officer who served as a drummer boy in the Union Army during the American Civil War. He gained fame for his bravery on the battlefield, becoming the youngest noncommissioned officer in the history of the United States Army at the age of 12.

He retired from the Army in 1915, having attained the rank of brigadier general in the Quartermaster Corps; he was at that time the last veteran of the American Civil War still on duty in the United States Armed Forces, although other similarly aged and experienced soldiers such as Peter Conover Hains and Albert A. Michelson rejoined the military after American entry into World War I in 1917.

By special act of Congress on August 29, 1916, he was promoted to major general on the retired list.

== Career ==
=== American Civil War ===
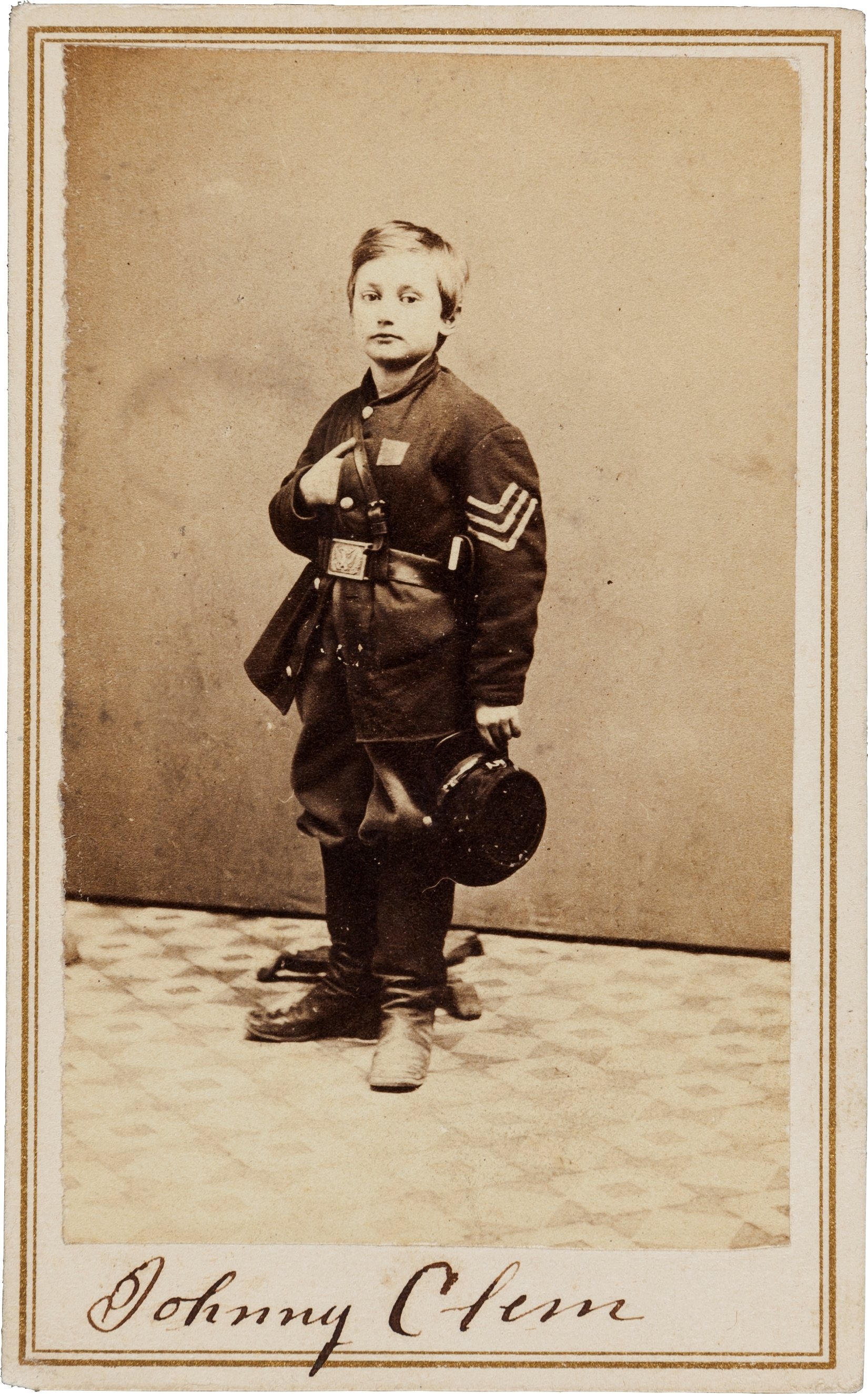
Clem during his Civil War service

He was born with the surname Klem in Newark, Ohio, on August 13, 1851, the son of Roman and Magdalene Klem. He is said to have run away from home at age 9 in May 1861, after the death of his mother in a train accident, to become a Union Army drummer boy. First he attempted to enlist in the 3rd Ohio Infantry but was rejected because of his age and small size. He then tried to join the 22nd Michigan, which also refused him. He tagged along anyway and the 22nd eventually adopted him as mascot and drummer boy. Officers chipped in to pay him the regular soldier's wage of $13 a month and allowed him to officially enlist two years later.

A popular legend suggests that Clem served as a drummer boy with the 22nd Michigan at the Battle of Shiloh. The legend suggests that he came very near to losing his life when a fragment from a shrapnel shell crashed through his drum, knocking him unconscious and that subsequently his comrades who found and rescued him from the battlefield nicknamed Clem "Johnny Shiloh." The weight of historical evidence however suggests that Clem could not have taken part in the battle of Shiloh; the 22nd Michigan appears to be the first unit in which Clem served in any capacity, but the regiment had not yet been constituted at the time of the battle, mustering into service in August 1862, four months after the battle. The Johnny Shiloh legend appears instead to stem from a popular Civil War song, "The Drummer Boy of Shiloh" by William S. Hays.

Regardless of the time of his entry into service, Clem served as a drummer boy for the 22nd Michigan at the Battle of Chickamauga in September 18–20, 1863, when he was twelve. He is said to have ridden an artillery caisson to the front and wielded a musket trimmed to his size. In the course of a Union retreat, he shot a Confederate colonel who had demanded his surrender. After the battle, the "Drummer Boy of Chickamauga" was promoted to sergeant, the youngest soldier ever to be a noncommissioned officer in the United States Army. Secretary of the Treasury, later Chief Justice of the United States, and fellow Ohioan, Salmon P. Chase, decorated him for his heroics at Chickamauga. Clem's fame for the shooting is also open for debate, despite press reports supporting the story into the early 20th century. It is possible that he wounded Colonel Calvin Walker, whose 3rd Tennessee opposed the 22nd Michigan towards the end of the battle.

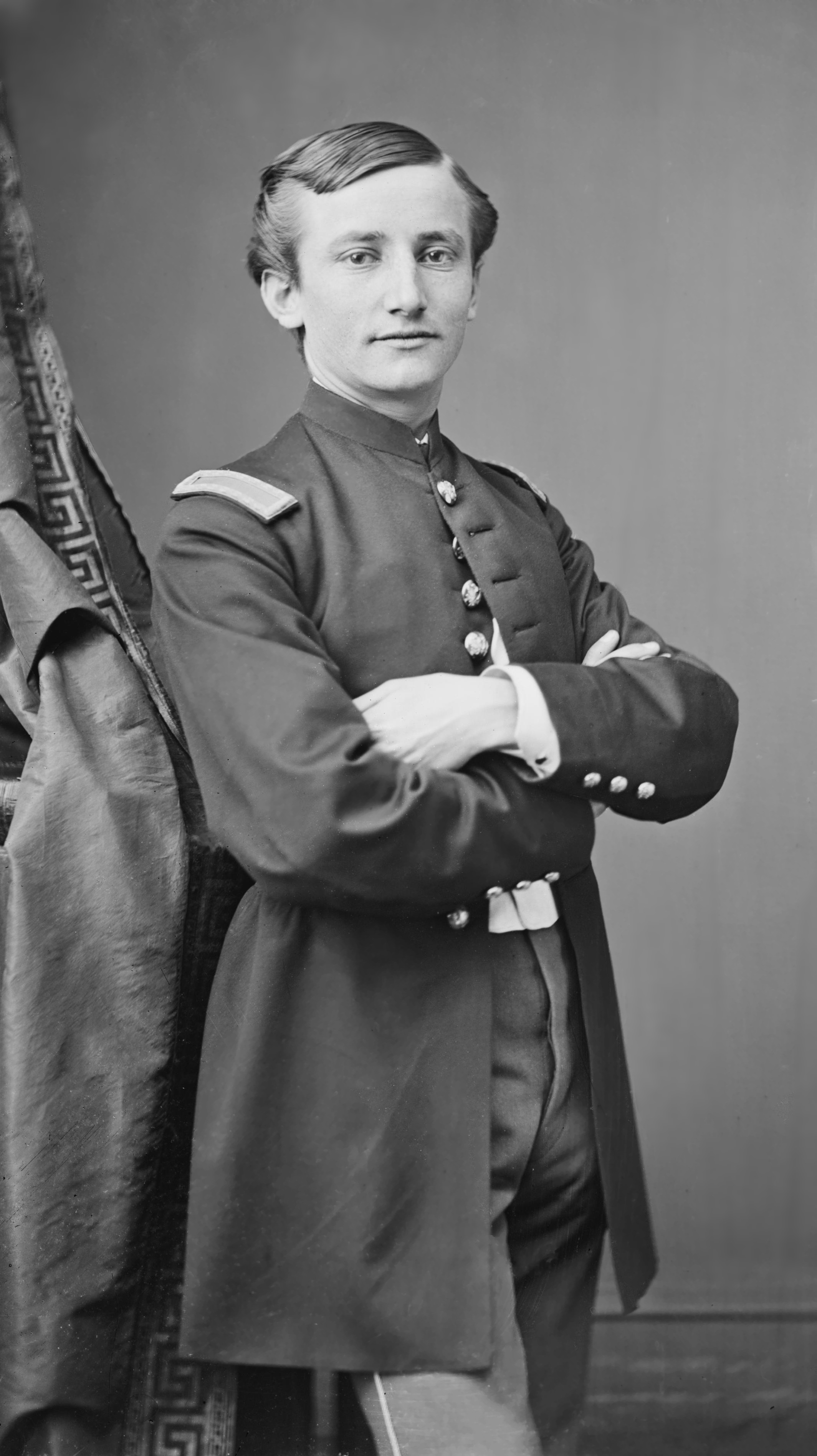
Clem in 1867

In October 1863, Clem was captured in Georgia by Confederate cavalrymen while detailed as a train guard. The Confederates confiscated his U.S. uniform, including his cap, which had three bullet holes in it, which reportedly upset him terribly. He was included in a prisoner exchange a short time later, and the Confederate newspapers used his age and celebrity status for propaganda purposes, to show to "what sore straits the Yankees are driven when they have to send their babies out to fight us." After participating with the Army of the Cumberland in many other battles, serving as a mounted orderly, he was discharged in September 1864. Clem was wounded in combat twice during the war.

== Later life ==
Clem graduated from high school in 1870. In 1871, he was elected commander/captain of the "Washington Rifles", a District of Columbia militia unit. After he failed the entrance exam to enter the United States Military Academy, President Ulysses S. Grant appointed him second lieutenant in the 24th Infantry Regiment in December 1871. Clem was promoted to first lieutenant in 1874. Clem graduated from artillery school at Fort Monroe in 1875. He was promoted to captain in 1882 and transferred to the Quartermaster Department where he stayed for the rest of his career. He was promoted to major in 1895.

During the Spanish–American War in 1898 he served as depot quartermaster in Portland, Oregon as well as department quartermaster for the Department of Columbia. He then served in the occupation of Puerto Rico as depot and chief quartermaster in San Juan.

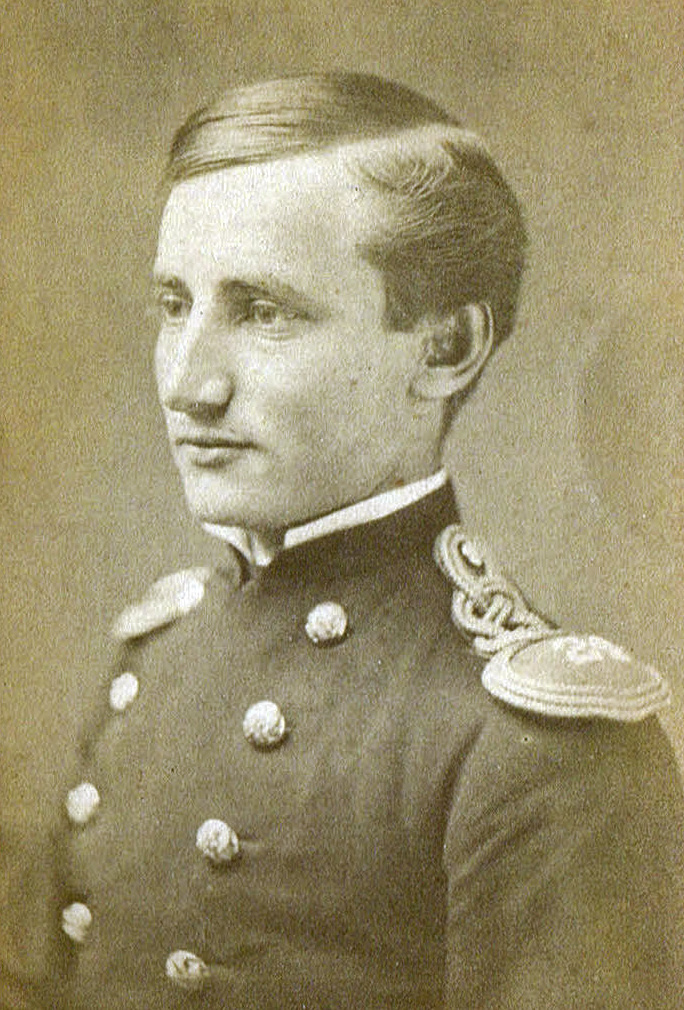
Carte de visite photo of Clem in 1871

Clem was promoted to lieutenant colonel in 1901 and to colonel in 1903. He then served from 1906 to 1911 as chief quartermaster at Fort Sam Houston in Texas.

Clem reached the mandatory retirement age of 64 on August 13, 1915, when he was retired and promoted to the rank of brigadier general, as was customary for American Civil War veterans who retired at the rank of colonel. Clem was the last veteran of the American Civil War serving in the U.S. Army at the time of his retirement, though other Civil War veterans, including Peter Conover Hains, re-entered the service in 1917 for World War I. On August 29, 1916, Clem was promoted on the retired list to the rank of major general.

== Personal life ==
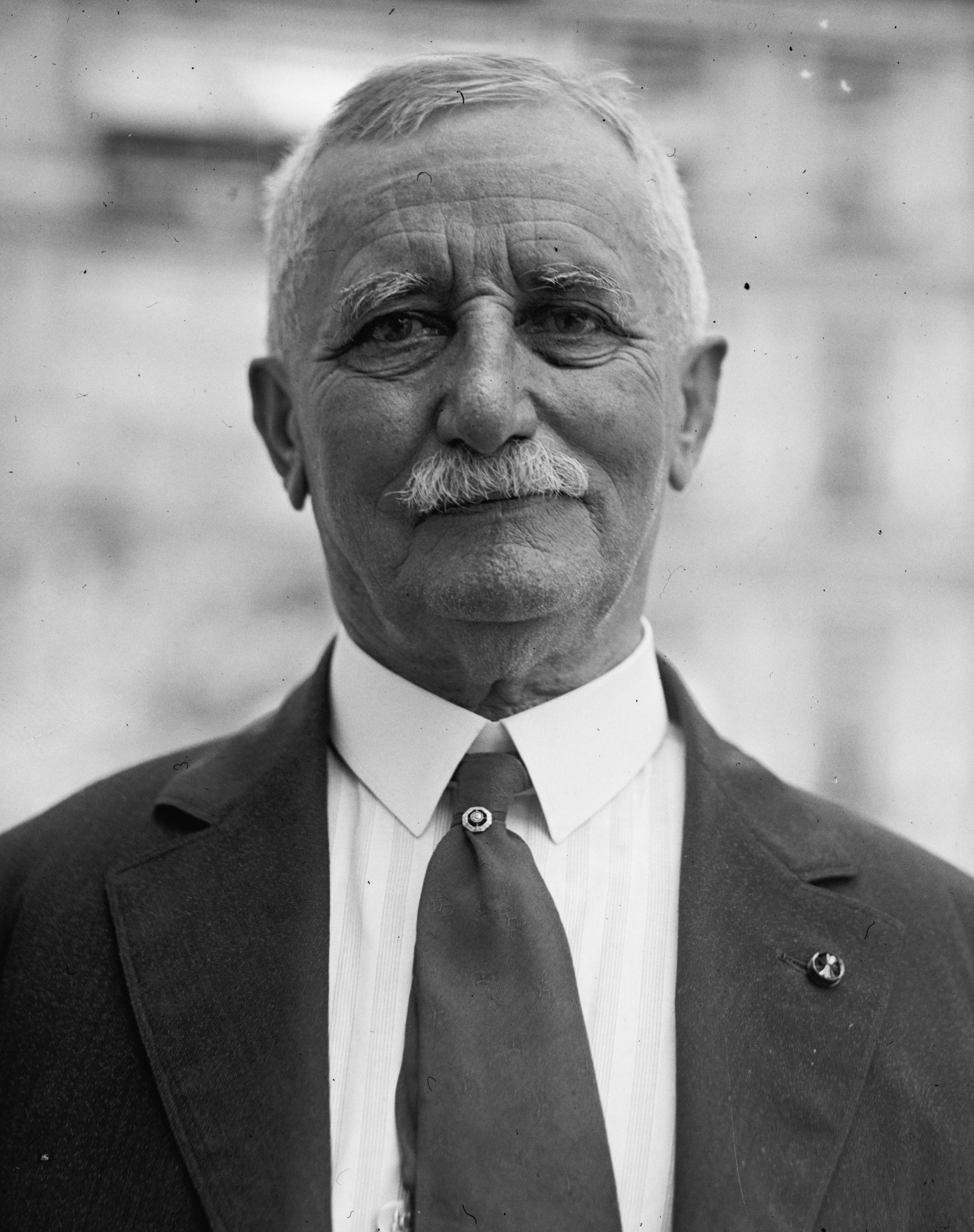
Clem in 1922

He married Anna Rosetta French, daughter of Major General William H. French, on May 24, 1875, in Maryland. After her death in 1899, he married Bessie Sullivan of San Antonio in 1903. Sullivan was the daughter of a Confederate veteran, leading Clem to claim that he was "the most united American" alive. Clem was the father of three children. Clem was a companion of the Military Order of the Loyal Legion of the United States and the Military Order of Foreign Wars.

After retirement he lived in Washington, D.C., before returning to San Antonio, Texas. He died in San Antonio on May 13, 1937, and was buried in Arlington National Cemetery.

== Dates of promotion ==
Through his military career Clem held the following ranks:

- Musician and Lance Sergeant, Co. C, 22nd Michigan Infantry – 1 May 1863 to 19 September 1864
- 2nd Lieutenant – 18 December 1871
- 1st Lieutenant – 5 October 1874
- Captain – 4 May 1882
- Major – 16 May 1895
- Lieutenant Colonel – 2 February 1901
- Colonel – 15 August 1903
- Brigadier General (Retired) – 13 August 1915
- Major General (Retired) – 29 August 1916

== Awards ==
- Civil War Campaign Medal
- Indian Campaign Medal
- Spanish War Service Medal

== Memorialization ==
- A 6-foot bronze statue of young John Clem stands near the Buckingham Meeting House in Newark, Ohio.
- A World War II U.S. Army troopship, the USAT John L. Clem, was named in his honor. The ship was scrapped in 1948.
- A public school in Newark, Ohio, is named after him: John Clem Elementary School.
- The city of Heath, Ohio, is co-extensive with Johnny Clem Township.

== Film portrayals ==
In 1963, Walt Disney produced a made-for-TV film entitled Johnny Shiloh, with Kevin Corcoran in the title role. The film was telecast on the Disney anthology television series. The Sherman Brothers wrote the film's theme song; their 1968 movie musical score for The One and Only Genuine Original Family Band also included a song about him called "Drummin', Drummin', Drummin'," performed in the film by Walter Brennan who played an ex-Confederate soldier.

In 2007 Historical Productions released the film Johnny: The True Story of a Civil War Legend, starring Cody Piper in the role of Johnny Lincoln (Shiloh) Clem. The film, which mixes historical and fictional narratives, includes numerous U.S. Civil War reenactments, and focuses on what life was like for Union soldiers.

== See also ==
- Child soldiers
- Drummer boy (military)
- Robert Henry Hendershot
