= USAT John L. Clem =

Ship

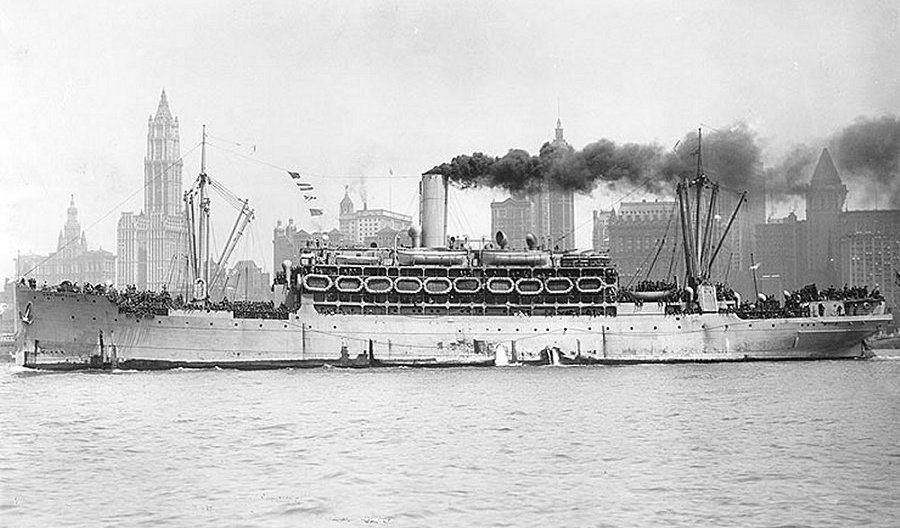
- USS Santa Ana (ID-2869) (later USAT John L. Clem) in New York Harbor, bringing home troops from World War I, July 1919

History

United States
- Name: Santa Ana (1918–1928); Guatemala (1928–1932); Santa Cecilia (1932–1936); Irwin (1936–1941); John L. Clem (1941–1948)
- Namesake: US Army Major General John Lincoln Clem
- Owner: United States Shipping Board; Grace Steamship Co. (to 1936); Merchants & Miners Transportation Company (1936–1941); United States Army
- Port of registry: United States
- Builder: William Cramp & Sons, Philadelphia
- Yard number: 442
- Laid down: 1 February 1917
- Launched: 13 October 1917
- Completed: 1 January 1918
- In service: Navy: Feb 1919 – Jul 1919; Commercial: 1918–1941; Army: Mar 1941 – 1946; PHS: 1946 (Surveyed for use, no evidence of use)
- Identification: Official number: 215880; Signal (commercial service): LJMQ (1919–1936); WADT (1936–1941)
- Fate: Sold for scrap, 1948

General characteristics
- Tonnage: 1921 Registry: 4,869 GRT; 2,892 NRT; After 1936 rebuild, 1938 Registry: 4,900 GRT; 2,900 NRT; Army: 5,211 GRT
- Displacement: 8890
- Length: 373 ft 9 in (113.9 m) LOA; 360.2 ft (109.8 m) Registered
- Beam: 51 ft 2 in (15.6 m)
- Draft: 22 ft 9 in (6.9 m)
- Depth: 33.8 ft (10.3 m)
- Installed power: 633 Nhp
- Propulsion: 4 boilers, 1 quadruple expansion engine
- Speed: 12 knots
- Complement: 204
- Armament: Unknown

John L. Clem was built as the cargo and passenger liner Santa Ana for W. R. Grace and Company for service in Grace Line's South American service but was requisitioned before completion by the United States Shipping Board (USSB) in 1918 due to World War I. The ship was chartered back to Grace after completion until turned over to the United States Navy to be briefly commissioned as the troop transport USS Santa Ana (ID-2869) from 11 February 1919 to 21 July 1919.

Between the wars she served from 1919 as the commercial liner Santa Ana (1919–1928) on service between New York and Valparaíso, Chile. As Guatemala (1928–1932) the ship served on Grace's subsidiary intercoastal service between San Francisco and New York. That service remained through the name change to Santa Cecilia (1932–1936) until laid up in 1934. The ship was sold to Merchants & Miners Transportation Company in 1936, underwent a rebuild and served in that line's coastwise service between Boston and Philadelphia as Irwin (1936–1941).

In March 1941 Irwin was acquired by the U.S. Army and assigned the name John L. Clem in honor of Major General John Lincoln Clem. The ship served as a United States Army Transport (USAT) from 1941 until conversion into a hospital ship between September 1943 and June 1944 serving as USAHS John L. Clem.

The ship had been assigned a prospective US Navy ID, AP-36, but never served with the Navy after 1919.

== Construction ==
Santa Ana, keel laid 1 February 1917, was built in 1917 at Philadelphia by William Cramp & Sons, as a passenger and cargo liner intended for the Grace Line launched 13 October 1917 and completed with delivery 1 January 1918 for the United States Shipping Board (USSB) after requisition during World War I.

The ship was designed to carry 100 first class passengers and 5,400 tons of cargo and was exclusively oil burning. Four boilers provided steam for a quadruple expansion engine.

Passenger accommodations, as they existed after conversion back to commercial service in 1919 and return to South American service, were two deluxe cabins with full bath aft of the bridge and another two below on the promenade deck. Thirty-eight cabins with two beds and one pull-down berth could accommodate three people each. All were outside cabins with windows. The social hall was directly below the bridge and extended the width of the ship. A dining room large enough to serve all passengers at one seating was forward in the main deck house with views on three sides. Aft was a bar and open air cafe.

Deck officers had single cabins on the bridge deck with engineering officers having quarters starboard in the main deck house near access to the engine room. Chinese stewards were housed in a poop deck cabin and crew, mostly West Indians, berthed in the forecastle.

This configuration may have lasted through the remodel in 1928 for the intercoastal San Francisco—New York service but not probably the conversion of 1936 into the coastwise Boston—Philadelphia service as Irwin.

=== Characteristics ===
The ship, as registered when returned to commercial service with Grace Line, was 4,869 GRT, 2,892 NRT, 360.2 ft (109.8 m) registered length, 51.6 ft (15.7 m) breadth, 33.8 ft (10.3 m) depth with official number 215880 and signal letters LJMQ. Navy characteristics were a length overall of 373 ft 9 in (113.9 m) and a draft of 22 ft 9 in (6.9 m).

=== Rebuild & alterations ===
Gross register tonnage is a calculation of a ship's internal volume, not weight, with the "tonnage" being number of units of 100 cubic feet (2.83 m^{3}). Thus the figure can change considerably with modifications. The ship built as Santa Ana underwent a number of such changes with several definitely reflecting change in GRT as seen in the ship's registration.

The ship, then named Irwin owned by Merchant & Miners Transportation Company of Baltimore, was rebuilt in 1936 by Maryland Drydock Company, Baltimore, Maryland. The change was then to 4,900 GRT, 2,900 NRT, signal letters WADT and home port of Baltimore.

There were further modifications made by the Army during conversion to a troop ship and then hospital ship so that varying figures for tonnage and displacement may be found. After an initial voyage as a troop ship modifications were made at Robins Drydock & Repair Co., New York, in a conversion between April and June 1941. In 1943, on selection as a hospital ship, conversion to that function was made at Mobile, Alabama. Another conversion was done after a decision in September 1945 to return the vessel to troop ship configuration. The shifts in the ship's ownership and function, and perhaps measurement methods, account for the varied figures for basic characteristics that may be found in sources. For example, the original application for registry, before the Navy's use of the ship, dated 20 December 1917 has 4,942 GRT. In the ship's final days, after rebuild and conversions, for Army the number is shown as 5,211 GRT.

== World War I ==
The USSB chartered Santa Ana to the Grace Company for commercial operation and after fitting out the ship made a maiden voyage on 2 February 1918 with runs between New York and Valparaíso until turned over to the Navy in 1919.

The Navy placed the ship in commission 11 February 1919 at Hoboken, New Jersey. As a unit of the Cruiser and Transport Force, she made four round-trip voyages between 27 February 1919 and 7 July 1919 to bring World War I veterans from France. On 21 July 1919 the ship was decommissioned and returned to the USSB which returned operation to Grace Line's South American service. (Note: The name is erroneously spelled Santa Anna in Ships' Data U.S. Naval Vessels, 1 October 1919. It is marked with an asterisk showing that it did not appear with details in the 1918 edition due to brief service.)

== Civilian service ==
=== Santa Ana (1918-1928) ===
Santa Ana served Grace Line's route to Peru and Chile in the line's weekly service out of New York in which one of the line's ships departed every other Saturday. The other ships built to serve the west coast of South America were the Cramp-built Santa Luisa and Santa Teresa with New York Shipbuilding's ships Santa Elisa and Santa Leonora. All five were returned by the USSB but Grace had determined only four were needed and refused Santa Leonora. The brochure "Sailings March–December 1927" indicates the typical routing on this route for the four ships:

New York, Cristobal, Balboa, Talara, Salaverry, Callao, Mollendo, Arica, Iquique, Tocopilla, Antofagasta, Chanaral, Valparaíso south bound with Chanaral and Tocopilla not visited on the return north.

Grace was introducing two new 16 kn (18 mph; 30 km/h) motor vessels, Santa Barbara (8,156 GRT) and Santa Maria (8,153 GRT), both 466 ft (142.0 m) registered length, completed in 1928 by Furness Shipbuilding Company in Haverton-on-Tees, England, and carrying 150 passengers to the route. (Note: Santa Barbara was O/N 227968, signal MGSJ; Santa Maria was O/N 227495, signal MGSK.) As a result, with only four ships needed for the New York—Valparaíso route, Santa Ana was transferred to the Grace subsidiary, Panama Mail Steamship Company, that operated between New York and San Francisco in intercoastal service and renamed Guatemala 16 June 1928 and remodeled for the intercoastal trade.

=== Guatemala (1928-1932) ===
Guatemala, now with home port of San Francisco, entered the popular intercoastal trade, along with ships of the Pacific Mail Steamship Company Grace had acquired. The line promoted a voyage on tropical seas lasting nearly a month with excursions in "Spanish Americas" at the Panama Canal and the countries of Colombia, Nicaragua, El Salvador, Guatemala and Mexico en route.

The "Sailings July 1930-March 1931" brochure titled "Panama Mail Cruises to Havana and New York via Spanish America from San Francisco and Los Angeles" shows the typical routing for Guatemala and four other ships on the route:

Eastbound from San Francisco, Los Angeles, Mazatlan, Champerico, San José de Guatemala, Acajutla, La Libertad, La Union, Corinto, Puntarenas, Balboa, Cristobal, Cartagena, Puerto Colombia, Havana and New York. Westbound from New York to Los Angeles and San Francisco, but not calling at Havana and on alternate voyages calling at Acajutla and La Union.

The Pacific Mail name was being phased out in favor of the Grace identity and so were ship names with the "Santa" prefix favored. On 22 December 1931 the ship was renamed ''Santa Cecilia.

=== Santa Cecilia (1932-1936) ===
The intracoastal routing remained under the new name. In May 1934 the smaller Grace ships, including Santa Cecilia, were laid up.

=== Irwin (1936-1941) ===
On 20 May 1936 the idle and laid up Santa Cecilia was sold to Merchants & Miners Transportation Company of Baltimore, Maryland, operating ships in coastwise trade along the Atlantic Coast. Santa Cecilia was converted for this trade by Maryland Drydock Company, Baltimore and was renamed Irwin. The ship, with home port of Baltimore and new signal WADT, was then placed on a Boston—Philadelphia route and remained on it until being acquired for wartime service in 1941.

== World War II Army service ==
The Navy had assigned a prospective hull number of AP-36 to the ship but it was never used and the ship was never a naval vessel in World War II.

=== Troopship ===
In March 1941 the U.S. Army purchased the Irwin which made one voyage between New York and San Juan, Puerto Rico before conversion into a troop ship between April and June by Robins Drydock & Repair Company at New York. The ship was renamed John L. Clem. From June 1941 until June 1942 the ship operated between the New York, Charleston, Panama, New Orleans, and Trinidad. The ship was assigned to "interisland service" operating between New Orleans and Port of Spain, Santa Lucia, Guantanamo, San Juan, Cristobal, and Key West until September 1943.

=== Hospital ship ===
After designation as a hospital ship to operate under the Hague Convention of 1907 on 24 February 1944 the ship was converted between September 1943 and June 1944 at Alabama Drydock & Shipbuilding Co., Mobile, Alabama. in June 1944, USAHS John L. Clem loaded supplies at the Charleston Port of Embarkation, the home port for hospital ships in European and Mediterranean theaters. On 15 June the ship sailed to the Mediterranean and with a stop at Gibraltar reached Oran on 3 July. Clem was then operated within the theater moving wounded between hospitals ashore.

The ship was one of Army hospital ships arriving off the beaches during the invasion of southern France, Operation Dragoon, beginning the day after the landings on 15 August 1944. Others were Acadia, Algonquin, Chateau Thierry, Emily Weder, Shamrock, and Thistle. Being the smallest Army hospital ship in patient capacity, 286, Clem had only one surgical team aboard while Acadia had three teams and the others two each.

Before departing the Mediterranean in March of 1945 the ship had transported patients of all nationalities between 59 ports including Algiers, Oran, Naples, Palermo, Livorno (Leghorn), Toulon, and Marseille covering some 35,000 miles. The ship arrived in Charleston 11 March 1945. After repairs the ship returned to the Mediterranean moving patients between Italy and North Africa, then between the Continent and England. Only John L. Clem and USAHS Ernest Hinds, the Army's two smallest hospital ships, operated in Europe after VE Day. USAHS John L. Clem departed for Charleston in June 1945 and later sailed for New York. John L. Clem began preparations and modifications, particularly improvements in ventilation, for service in the Pacific. However, Japan surrendered and the plans were cancelled.

== Postwar service ==
After the Japanese surrender John L. Clem was decommissioned as a hospital ship and converted to a troop transport. The War Shipping Administration (WSA) requested the ship be used to transport Jamaican workers between Kingston, Jamaica and Port Everglades, Florida. After a final trip to Nassau, Bahamas the ship was turned over to WSA at Hampton Roads as surplus to Army requirements in January 1946.

== Reserve and scrapping ==
The ship was surveyed by the U.S. Public Health Service for possible use, though it is unclear that the ship was ever activated for that agency. On 5 December 1946 she was laid up in the Maritime Commission's National Defense Reserve Fleet at Brunswick, Georgia, under her previous name of Irwin. The ship was sold to Patapsco Scrap Corporation, Baltimore, Maryland for scrapping 30 December 1947 and withdrawn from the reserve fleet for that purpose 21 January 1948.
