= Edward Bradley (politician) =

American politician

Member of the U.S. House of Representatives from Michigan's 2nd district
- In office March 4, 1847 – August 5, 1847
- Preceded by: John Smith Chipman
- Succeeded by: Charles E. Stuart

Personal details
- Born: April 1808 East Bloomfield, New York, U.S.
- Died: August 5, 1847 (aged 39) New York City
- Resting place: Congressional Cemetery

Edward Bradley (April 1808 – August 5, 1847) was a 19th-century American lawyer who in 1847 served briefly in the U.S. House of Representatives from the state of Michigan.

== Biography ==
Bradley was born in East Bloomfield, New York, and attended the common schools and the local academy in Canandaigua.

=== Legal career ===
He was associate judge of the common pleas court of Ontario County in 1836. He moved to Detroit, Michigan, in 1839 where he studied law and was admitted to the bar in 1841. He commenced practice in Marshall and became prosecuting attorney of Calhoun County in 1842.

=== Early political career ===
He was a member of the Michigan State Senate in 1842 and 1843 and developed a reputation as a gifted orator and stump speaker.

=== Congress ===
He was elected as a Democrat to the United States House of Representatives for the Thirtieth Congress, serving from March 4, 1847, until his death.

=== Death and burial ===
He died on August 5, 1847 in New York City while en route to Washington, D.C. before the assembling of Congress. He was interred in the Congressional Cemetery in Washington, D.C.

== See also ==
- List of members of the United States Congress who died in office (1790–1899)

U.S. House of Representatives
Preceded by John S. Chipman	United States Representative for the 2nd congressional district of Michigan; 1847	Succeeded by Charles E. Stuart
