= William Sprague (Michigan politician) =

American politician

Member of the U.S. House of Representatives from Michigan's 2nd district
- In office March 4, 1849 – March 3, 1851
- Preceded by: Charles E. Stuart
- Succeeded by: Charles E. Stuart

Personal details
- Born: February 23, 1809 Providence, Rhode Island, U.S.
- Died: September 19, 1868 (aged 59) Kalamazoo, Michigan, U.S.
- Party: Whig

William Sprague (February 23, 1809 – September 19, 1868) was a minister and politician in the U.S. state of Michigan. From 1849 to 1851, he served one term in the U.S. House of Representatives.

== Biography ==
Sprague was born in Providence, Rhode Island, a distant cousin of William Sprague, Governor of Rhode Island. He attended the public schools there, moved to Michigan, and settled in Kalamazoo, where he studied theology and was ordained as a minister. He was presiding elder of the Methodist Episcopal Church, Kalamazoo district, 1844–1848. Sprague served as United States Indian Agent in Michigan 1852–1853.

=== Religious leader ===
In the early 1830s, Sprague was a circuit minister for many communities in central and southwest Michigan. He delivered the first gospel sermon ever given in Van Buren County, Michigan, in the first log cabin which was built in spring 1829. He organized the first Methodist class in Niles in 1832 and was pastor there in 1862 when construction began on a historical Italianate style church building.

In the fall of 1832, Sprague became circuit pastor for Coldwater.

=== Congress ===
Sprague defeated incumbent Democrat Charles E. Stuart to be elected as a Whig, though he is sometimes also identified with the Free Soil Party, from Michigan's 2nd District to the Thirty-first Congress, serving March 4, 1849–March 3, 1851. He did not run for re-election.

=== Retirement and death ===
He retired to his farm in Oshtemo Township, Kalamazoo County.

He died in Kalamazoo, and was interred in Mountain Home Cemetery.

U.S. House of Representatives
Preceded by Charles E. Stuart	United States Representative for the 2nd congressional district of Michigan; 1849–1851	Succeeded by Charles E. Stuart
