= 22nd Michigan Infantry Regiment =

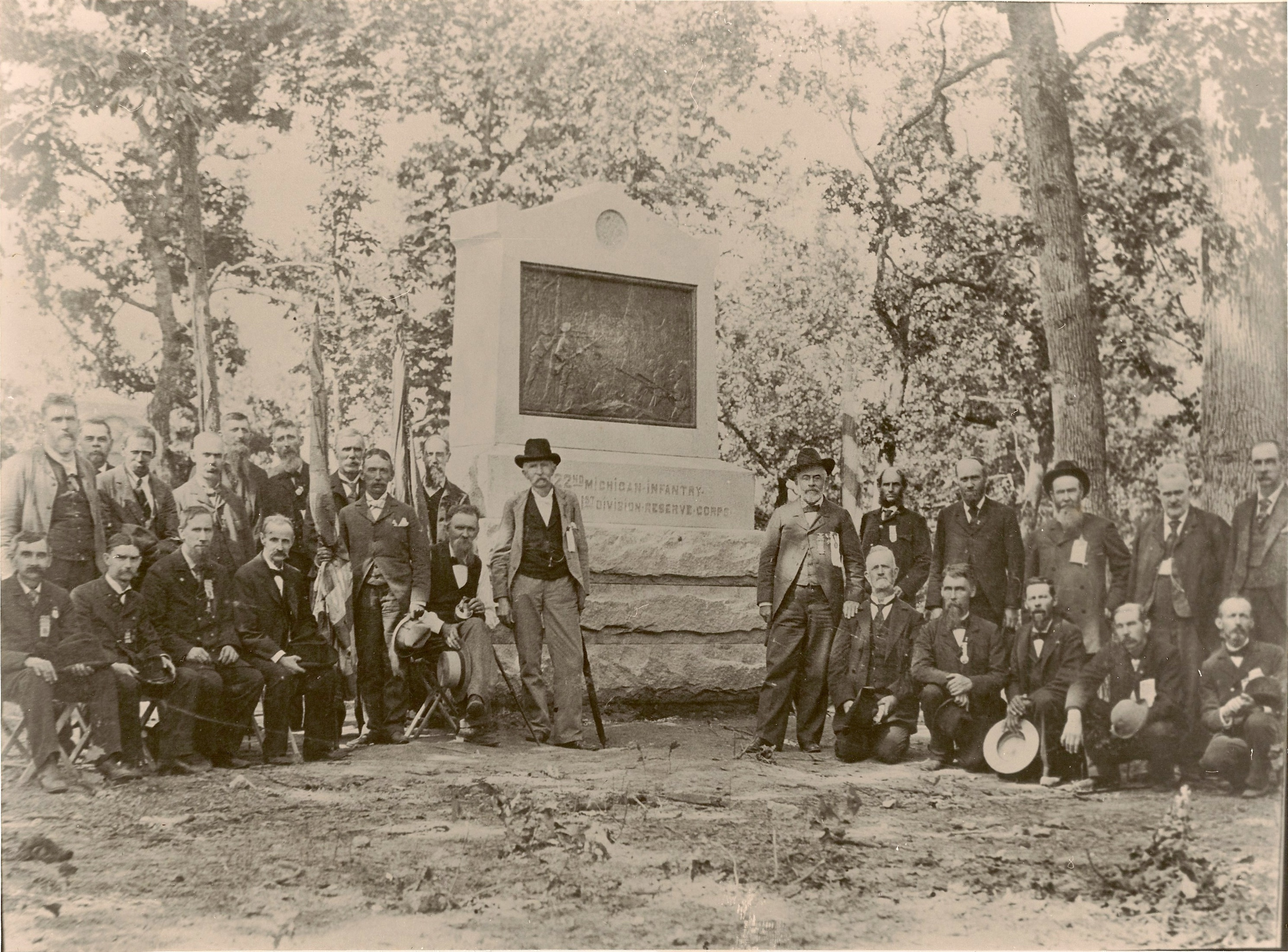
- 1st Division Reserve Corps
- Active: August 29, 1862, to June 26, 1865
- Country: United States
- Allegiance: Union
- Branch: Infantry
- Engagements: Defense of Cincinnati; Battle of Chickamauga; Battle of Kennesaw Mountain; Siege of Atlanta; Battle of Jonesboro

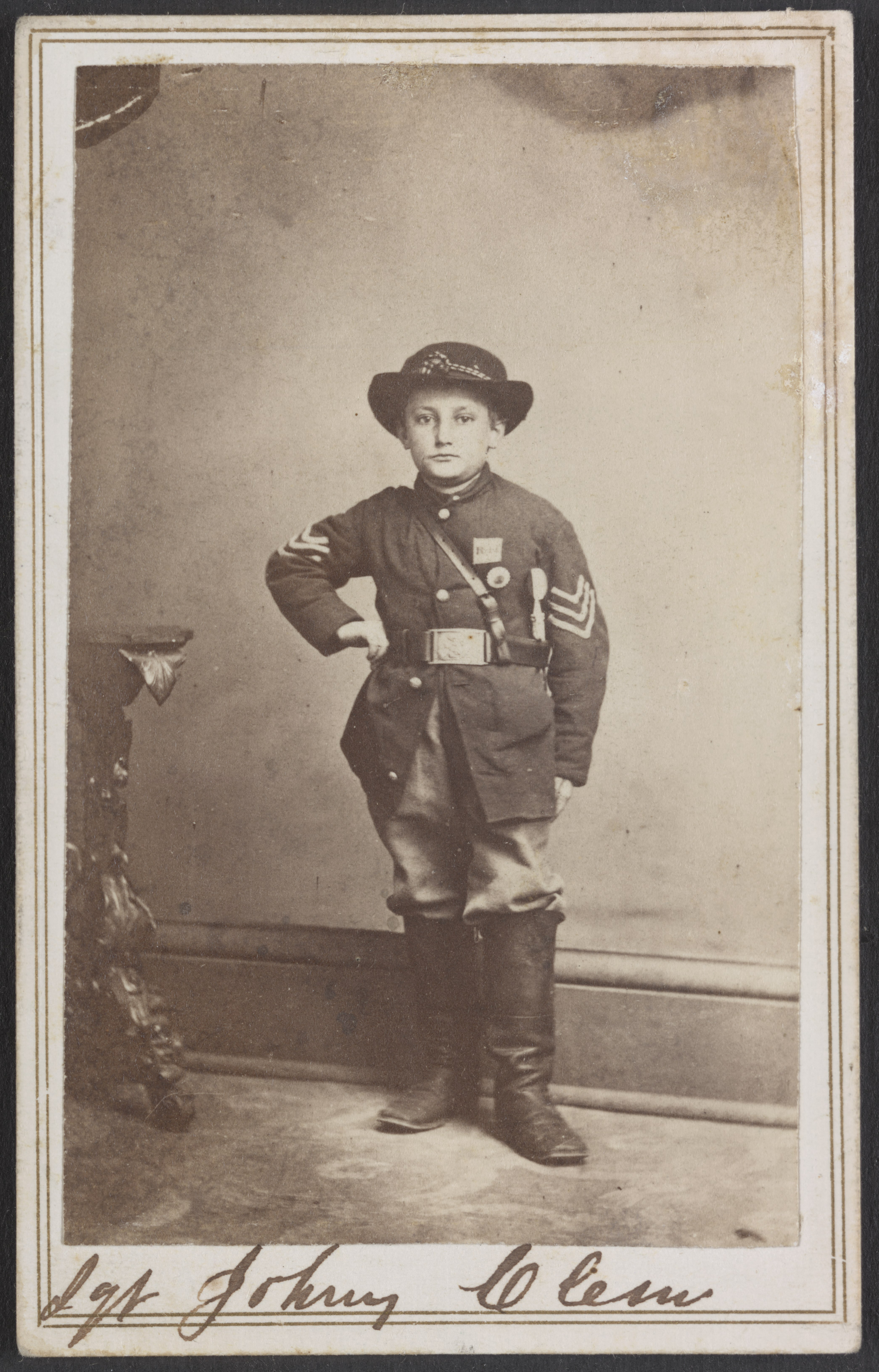
Child soldier Sgt. John Clem. He served in Co. C, 22nd Michigan Infantry Regiment from May 1, 1863 to September 19, 1864. From the Liljenquist Family Collection of Civil War Photographs, Prints and Photographs Division, Library of Congress

The 22nd Michigan Infantry Regiment was an infantry regiment that served in the Union Army during the American Civil War.

== Service ==
Former Governor of Michigan Moses Wisner worked to raise the 22nd Michigan Infantry and was commissioned as its colonel. The new regiment was mustered into Federal service at Pontiac, Michigan, on August 29, 1862. Among its ranks was Henry W. Howgate, who after the war became a controversial figure as the Chief Disbursing Officer for the United States Army Signal Corps in charge of Arctic explorations. Another notable member was John Clem, also known as the Drummer Boy of Chickamauga and Johnny Shiloh, the youngest non-commissioned officer ever to serve in the U.S. Military and the last Civil War veteran still on active duty at the time of his retirement.

In September 1862, Wisner was stricken with typhoid fever while en route to the regiment's deployment and died in Kentucky.

The 22nd Michigan Infantry was mustered out of service on June 26, 1865.

== Total strength and casualties ==
The regiment suffered 3 officers and 86 enlisted men who were killed in action or mortally wounded and 4 officers and 306 enlisted men who died of disease, for a total of 399 fatalities.

== Commanders ==
- Colonel Moses Wisner
- Colonel Heber Le Favour
- 1st Lieutenant (Adjutant) Louis A Allor
- 1st Lieutenant (Adjutant) Edgar Weeks

== See also ==
- List of Michigan Civil War Units
- Michigan in the American Civil War
