= Moses Wisner =

American politician

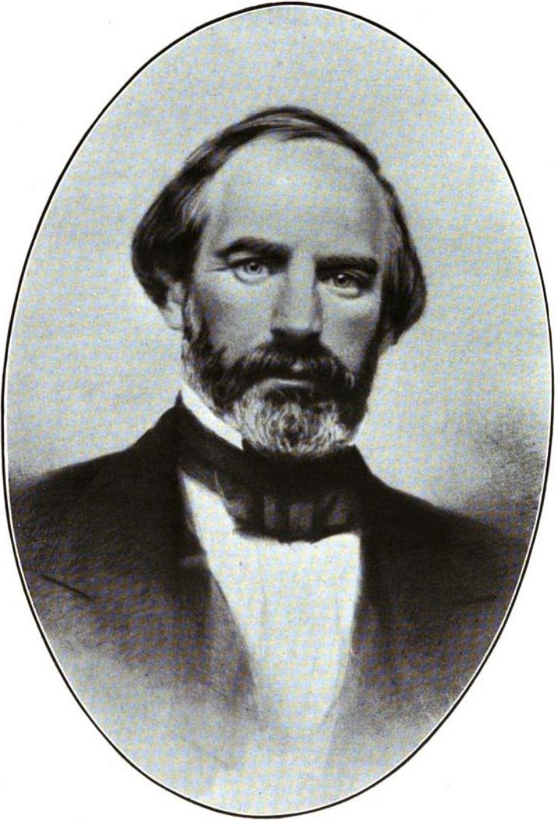

12th Governor of Michigan
- In office January 5, 1859 – January 2, 1861
- Lieutenant: Edmund B. Fairfield
- Preceded by: Kinsley Bingham
- Succeeded by: Austin Blair

Personal details
- Born: June 3, 1815 Springport, New York
- Died: January 5, 1863 (aged 47) Lexington, Kentucky
- Party: Republican
- Spouse: Angeolina Hascall

Moses Wisner (June 3, 1815 – January 5, 1863) was the 12th governor of Michigan, a Colonel during the Civil War, and an active supporter of the anti-slavery movement.

== Early life in New York ==
Wisner was born in Springport, New York, descendant from a family from Switzerland which emigrated to America in the early 18th-century and settled in Orange County, New York. His father was Moses Wisner, a Colonel during the War of 1812, while his brother, George Washington Wisner, was one of the early founders of The Sun newspaper. One of Wisner's distant relatives is Henry Wisner, delegate from New York to the Continental Congress and major participant against the British in the American Revolution.

He received an education in the common schools while working on his parents’ farm. In 1837, he moved to Michigan and settled on a farm in Lapeer County. Two years later, he gave up on farming and moved to Pontiac, Michigan.

== Life and politics in Michigan ==
He studied law while working at the law firm of his brother, George W. Wisner, and Rufus Hosmer. In 1841, he was admitted to the bar at Pontiac and then moved to the village of Lapeer, Michigan to begin to practice. He was appointed prosecuting attorney for Lapeer County in 1843 by Governor William Woodbridge. He moved back to Pontiac to join a law firm there.

Wisner was not especially active in politics until after the election of U.S. President Franklin Pierce in 1852, when he became active in the anti-slavery movement. He was one of the foremost critics in Michigan of the Kansas-Nebraska Act of 1854 which repealed the Missouri Compromise and opened the territories to slavery. He participated in the first convention of the U.S. Republican Party in Jackson, Michigan in July, 1854 where he declined nomination as Michigan Attorney General. That same year he was an unsuccessful candidate from Michigan's 4th congressional district to the U.S. House against Democrat George Washington Peck.

In 1858, Wisner was elected the 12th governor of Michigan by a large majority and served one term from 1859 to 1861. After his term was over he returned to his home in Pontiac and resumed the practice of law.

== Death and legacy ==
In September 1862 during the American Civil War, Wisner worked to raise the 22nd Michigan Infantry and was commissioned a colonel, but was stricken with typhoid fever while en route to the regiment's deployment. He died at the age of 47 in a private home near Lexington, Kentucky, and left behind his wife, Angeolina Hascall, the daughter of General Charles C. Hascall, of Flint, Michigan, and four children.

Moses Wisner is interred at Oak Hill Cemetery in Pontiac.

Wisner's Greek Revival-Style mansion in Pontiac, the Moses Wisner House, is listed on the National Register of Historic Places. This site is now part of the Pine Grove Historical Museum, which hosts occasional social gatherings including weddings and ice cream socials.

Wisner Township, Michigan, in Tuscola County is named after Moses Wisner. Wisner Stadium, a football stadium located in Pontiac, Michigan, is also named for Wisner.

Party political offices
Preceded by Kinsley S. Bingham	Republican nominee for Governor of Michigan; 1858	Succeeded by Austin Blair
Political offices
Preceded by Kinsley S. Bingham	Governor of Michigan; 1859–1861	Succeeded by Austin Blair
