= 13th Michigan Infantry Regiment =

- Michigan state flag
- Active: January 17, 1862, to July 25, 1865
- Country: United States
- Allegiance: Union
- Branch: Infantry
- Engagements: Battle of Shiloh; Siege of Corinth; Battle of Perryville; Battle of Stones River; Tullahoma Campaign; Battle of Chickamauga; Siege of Chattanooga; Sherman's March to the Sea; Carolinas campaign; Battle of Bentonville

The 13th Michigan Infantry Regiment was an infantry regiment that served in the Union Army during the American Civil War.

== Service ==
The 13th Michigan Infantry was organized at Kalamazoo, Michigan, and mustered into service for three years enlistment on January 17, 1862, under the command of Colonel Charles Edward Stuart.

The regiment was attached to 15th Brigade, 4th Division, Army of the Ohio, to March 1862. 20th Brigade, 6th Division, Army of the Ohio, to September 1862. 20th Brigade, 6th Division, II Corps, Army of the Ohio, to November 1862. 3rd Brigade, 1st Division, Left Wing, XIV Corps, Army of the Cumberland, to January 1863. 3rd Brigade, 1st Division, XXI Corps, to April 1863. 1st Brigade, 1st Division, XXI Corps, to October 1863. 2nd Brigade, 2nd Division, IV Corps, Army of the Cumberland, to November 1863. Engineer Brigade, Department of the Cumberland, to October 1864. 2nd Brigade, 1st Division, XIV Corps, Army of the Cumberland, to July 1865.

The 13th Michigan Infantry mustered out of service at Louisville, Kentucky, on July 25, 1865.

== Detailed service ==
Left Michigan for Nashville, Tenn., February 12. March from Nashville, Tenn., to Savannah, Tenn., to reinforce the Army of the Tennessee, March 29-April 7, 1862. Battle of Shiloh, April 7. Advance on and siege of Corinth, Miss., April 29-May 30. Pursuit to Booneville June 1–12. Buell's operations in northern Alabama and middle Tennessee on line of the Memphis & Charleston Railroad June to August. Duty at Stevenson, Ala., July 18 to August 31 building forts and stockades and guarding the railroad. March to Louisville, Ky., in pursuit of Bragg August 31-September 26. Pursuit of Bragg to Wild Cat, Ky., October 1–16. Battle of Perryville, October 8 (reserve). Nelson's Cross Roads October 18. March to Nashville, Tenn., October 22-November 7. Duty at Nashville, Tenn., until December 26. Advance on Murfreesboro December 26–30. Battle of Stones River December 30–31, 1862 and January 1–3, 1863. Duty at Murfreesboro until June. Tullahoma Campaign June 23-July 7. At Hillsboro, Tenn., until August 16. Passage of the Cumberland Mountains and Tennessee River and Chickamauga Campaign August 16-September 22. Expedition from Tracy City to Tennessee River August 22–24 (detachment). Occupation of Chattanooga September 9. Lee and Gordon's Mills September 17–18. Battle of Chickamauga, September 19–20. Siege of Chattanooga September 24-November 23. Chattanooga-Ringgold Campaign November 23–27. Battles of Chattanooga November 23–25. Stationed on the Chickamauga; engaged in picket duty and cutting timber for warehouses in Chattanooga until February 17, 1864. Engineer duty at Chattanooga and stationed at Lookout Mountain constructing military hospitals until September 1864. Relieved from engineer duty and pursuit of Forrest into northern Alabama September 25-October 17. Joined Sherman's army at Kingston, Ga., November 7. March to the sea November 15-December 10. Skirmishes at Dalton, Ga., November 30 and December 5 (detachments). Siege of Savannah December 10–21. Campaign of the Carolinas January to April, 1865. Averysboro, N.C., March 16. Battle of Bentonville March 19–21. Occupation of Goldsboro March 24. Advance on Raleigh April 10–14. Occupation of Raleigh April 14. Bennett's House April 26. Surrender of Johnston and his army. March to Washington, D.C., via Richmond, Va., April 29-May 19. Grand Review of the Armies May 24. Moved to Louisville, Ky., June 9–15.

== Casualties ==
The regiment lost a total of 388 men during service; 4 officers and 68 enlisted men killed or mortally wounded, 2 officers and 314 enlisted men died of disease.

== Commanders ==
- Colonel Charles Edward Stuart - resigned
- Colonel Michael Shoemaker

== See also ==
- List of Michigan Civil War Units
- Michigan in the American Civil War
