= Political party strength in Michigan =

Politics in the US state of Michigan

The tables below indicate the political party affiliation of elected officials in the U.S. State of Michigan from statehood through the results of the November 2022 elections. (Note: Until 1851, elections were held in odd number years; since that time, they have been held in even number years, on the first Tuesday in November, coincident with other national and state elections. Winners are now sworn in on January 1. Governors were elected to two year terms from 1837 until 1966 when the term was set at four years. Effective with the 2003 retirement of John Engler, governors are subject to a lifetime term limit of two four year terms.)

Officials listed include: Governors, Lieutenant Governors, Secretaries of State, Attorneys General/
State Treasurers. (Note: State Treasurers are listed for the time period when it was an elective office, (1850–1963).) The tables also indicate the historical party composition in the State Senate, State House of Representatives, the names and party affiliations of Michigan's U.S. Senators, and the party composition of Michigan's delegations to the U.S. House of Representatives. For years in which a presidential election was held, the tables show which party's nominees received the State's electoral votes.

== 1837–1899 ==
Year	Executive offices					State Legislature		United States Congress			Electoral votes
Year	Governor	Lt. Governor	Secretary of State	Attorney General	Treasurer	State Senate	State House	U.S. Senator (Class I)	U.S. Senator (Class II)	U.S. House	Electoral votes
1837	Stevens T. Mason (D)	Edward Mundy (D)	Kintzing Prichette (D)	Peter Morey (D)	appointed office	8D, 5W, 3?	24W, 23D, 2? (Note: Elected a Democratic as Speaker, Charles Whipple.)	Lucius Lyon (D)	John Norvell (D)	1D	Van Buren/ Johnson (D) ✓ (Note: Michigan participated in the 1836 election but had not yet been formally admitted to the Union as a state due to a boundary dispute with Ohio.)
1838	Stevens T. Mason (D)	Edward Mundy (D)	Randolph Manning (D) (Note: A Democrat until 1854, Manning became a Republican because of the Republican Party's anti slavery position.)	Peter Morey (D)	appointed office	14D, 2W	30D, 20W	Lucius Lyon (D)	John Norvell (D)	1D	Van Buren/ Johnson (D) ✓
1839	Stevens T. Mason (D)	Edward Mundy (D)	Randolph Manning (D)	Peter Morey (D)	appointed office	11D, 6W	31D, 21W	vacant	John Norvell (D)	1D	Van Buren/ Johnson (D) ✓
1840	William Woodbridge (W) (Note: Resigned to take an elected seat in the U.S. Senate.)	James Wright Gordon (W)	Thomas Rowland (W)	Peter Morey (D)	appointed office	10W, 7D	37W, 15D	Augustus Seymour Porter (W)	John Norvell (D)	1D	Harrison/ Tyler (W) ✓
1841	James Wright Gordon (W) (Note: As lieutenant governor, acted as governor for unexpired term.)	Thomas J. Drake (W)	Thomas Rowland (W)	Zephaniah Platt (W)	appointed office	12W, 5D	31W, 20D, 1 tie	Augustus Seymour Porter (W)	William Woodbridge (W)	1W	Harrison/ Tyler (W) ✓
1842	John S. Barry (D)	Origen D. Richardson (D)	Robert P. Eldredge (D)	Zephaniah Platt (W)	appointed office	12D, 5W, 1 vac.	47D, 6W	Augustus Seymour Porter (W)	William Woodbridge (W)	1W	Harrison/ Tyler (W) ✓
1843	John S. Barry (D)	Origen D. Richardson (D)	Robert P. Eldredge (D)	Elon Farnsworth (D)	appointed office	18D	46D, 7W	Augustus Seymour Porter (W)	William Woodbridge (W)	3D	Harrison/ Tyler (W) ✓
1844	John S. Barry (D)	Origen D. Richardson (D)	Robert P. Eldredge (D)	Elon Farnsworth (D)	appointed office	18D	47D, 6W	Augustus Seymour Porter (W)	William Woodbridge (W)	3D	Polk/ Dallas (D) ✓
1845	John S. Barry (D)	Origen D. Richardson (D)	Robert P. Eldredge (D)	Henry N. Walker (D)	appointed office	18D	46D, 7W	Lewis Cass (D)	William Woodbridge (W)	3D	Polk/ Dallas (D) ✓
1846	Alpheus Felch (D)	William L. Greenly (D)	Gideon O. Whittemore	Henry N. Walker (D)	appointed office	20D, 1W	50D, 16W	Lewis Cass (D)	William Woodbridge (W)	3D	Polk/ Dallas (D) ✓
1847	William L. Greenly (D)	Charles P. Bush (D)	Gideon O. Whittemore	Edward Mundy (D)	appointed office	20D, 2W	51D, 15W	Lewis Cass (D)	Alpheus Felch (D)	3D	Polk/ Dallas (D) ✓
1848	Epaphroditus Ransom (D)	William M. Fenton (D)	George Washington Peck (D)	George V. N. Lothrop (D)	appointed office	21D, 1W	51D, 15W	Thomas Fitzgerald (D)	Alpheus Felch (D)	3D	Cass/ Butler (D) ✗
1849	Epaphroditus Ransom (D)	William M. Fenton (D)	George Washington Peck (D)	George V. N. Lothrop (D)	appointed office	18D, 4W	46D, 16W, 3FS, 1 tie	Lewis Cass (D)	Alpheus Felch (D)	2D, 1W	Cass/ Butler (D) ✗
1850	John S. Barry (D)	William M. Fenton (D)	George R. Redfield (D)	George V. N. Lothrop (D)	Bernard C. Whittemore (D) (Note: First elected treasurer)	18D, 4W	46D, 20W	Lewis Cass (D)	Alpheus Felch (D)	2D, 1W	Cass/ Butler (D) ✗
1851	John S. Barry (D)	William M. Fenton (D)	Charles H. Taylor (D)	William Hale (D)	Bernard C. Whittemore (D)	16D, 5W, 1FSD (Note: Effective with the Constitution of 1850, terms for Senator were increased to two years.)	40D, 26W (Note: Effective with the Constitution of 1850, terms for Representative were increased to two years.)	Lewis Cass (D)	Alpheus Felch (D)	2W, 1D	Cass/ Butler (D) ✗
1852	Robert McClelland (Note: After a new state constitution was drafted in 1850, McClelland was elected to a single one-year term in 1851. He was then re-elected to a full two-year term in 1852 but resigned to become United States Secretary of the Interior.)	Calvin Britain (D)	Charles H. Taylor (D)	William Hale (D)	Bernard C. Whittemore (D)	16D, 5W, 1FSD	40D, 26W	Lewis Cass (D)	Alpheus Felch (D)	2W, 1D	Pierce/ King (D) ✓
1853	Robert McClelland	Andrew Parsons (D)	William Graves (D)	William Hale (D)	Bernard C. Whittemore (D)	25D, 7W	52D, 19W, 1?	Lewis Cass (D)	Charles E. Stuart (D)	4D	Pierce/ King (D) ✓
1853	Andrew Parsons (D)	George Griswold (D)	William Graves (D)	William Hale (D)	Bernard C. Whittemore (D)	25D, 7W	52D, 19W, 1?	Lewis Cass (D)	Charles E. Stuart (D)	4D	Pierce/ King (D) ✓
1854	Andrew Parsons (D)	George Griswold (D)	William Graves (D)	William Hale (D)	Bernard C. Whittemore (D)	25D, 7W	52D, 19W, 1?	Lewis Cass (D)	Charles E. Stuart (D)	4D	Pierce/ King (D) ✓
1855	Kinsley S. Bingham (R)	George Coe (R)	John McKinney (R) (Note: Democrat, then Republican after 1854)	Jacob M. Howard (R)	Silas M. Holmes (R) (Note: Ran on the first Republican state ticket in 1854)	25R, 7D	48R, 24D	Lewis Cass (D)	Charles E. Stuart (D)	3R, 1D	Pierce/ King (D) ✓
1856	Kinsley S. Bingham (R)	George Coe (R)	John McKinney (R)	Jacob M. Howard (R)	Silas M. Holmes (R)	25R, 7D	48R, 24D	Lewis Cass (D)	Charles E. Stuart (D)	3R, 1D	Frémont/ Dayton (R) ✗
1857	Kinsley S. Bingham (R)	George Coe (R)	John McKinney (R)	Jacob M. Howard (R)	Silas M. Holmes (R)	29R, 3D	63R, 17D	Zachariah Chandler (R)	Charles E. Stuart (D)	4R	Frémont/ Dayton (R) ✗
1858	Kinsley S. Bingham (R)	George Coe (R)	John McKinney (R)	Jacob M. Howard (R)	Silas M. Holmes (R)	29R, 3D	63R, 17D	Zachariah Chandler (R)	Charles E. Stuart (D)	4R	Frémont/ Dayton (R) ✗
1859	Moses Wisner (R)	Edmund Burke Fairfield (R)	Nelson G. Isbell (R) (Note: Republican after 1854, Whig before that.)	Jacob M. Howard (R)	John McKinney (R)	24R, 8D	56R, 25D	Zachariah Chandler (R)	Kinsley S. Bingham (R)	3R, 1D	Frémont/ Dayton (R) ✗
1860	Moses Wisner (R)	Edmund Burke Fairfield (R)	Nelson G. Isbell (R)	Jacob M. Howard (R)	John McKinney (R)	24R, 8D	56R, 25D	Zachariah Chandler (R)	Kinsley S. Bingham (R)	3R, 1D	Lincoln/ Hamlin (R) ✓
1861	Austin Blair (R)	James M. Birney (R)	James B. Porter (R)	Charles Upson (R)	John Owen (R)	30R, 2D	72R, 11D	Zachariah Chandler (R)	Kinsley S. Bingham (R)	4R	Lincoln/ Hamlin (R) ✓
1861	Austin Blair (R)	Joseph R. Williams (R)	James B. Porter (R)	Charles Upson (R)	John Owen (R)	30R, 2D	72R, 11D	Zachariah Chandler (R)	Kinsley S. Bingham (R)	4R	Lincoln/ Hamlin (R) ✓
1862	Austin Blair (R)	Henry T. Backus (R)	James B. Porter (R)	Charles Upson (R)	John Owen (R)	30R, 2D	72R, 11D	Zachariah Chandler (R)	Jacob M. Howard (R)	4R	Lincoln/ Hamlin (R) ✓
1863	Austin Blair (R)	Charles S. May (R)	James B. Porter (R)	Albert Williams (R)	John Owen (R)	18R, 14D	60R, 39D, 1?	Zachariah Chandler (R)	Jacob M. Howard (R)	5R, 1D	Lincoln/ Hamlin (R) ✓
1864	Austin Blair (R)	Charles S. May (R)	James B. Porter (R)	Albert Williams (R)	John Owen (R)	18R, 14D	60R, 39D, 1?	Zachariah Chandler (R)	Jacob M. Howard (R)	5R, 1D	Lincoln/ Johnson (NU) ✓
1865	Henry H. Crapo (R)	Ebenezer O. Grosvenor (R)	James B. Porter (R)	Albert Williams (R)	John Owen (R)	21R, 11D	73R, 27D	Zachariah Chandler (R)	Jacob M. Howard (R)	6R	Lincoln/ Johnson (NU) ✓
1866	Henry H. Crapo (R)	Ebenezer O. Grosvenor (R)	James B. Porter (R)	Albert Williams (R)	John Owen (R)	21R, 11D	73R, 27D	Zachariah Chandler (R)	Jacob M. Howard (R)	6R	Lincoln/ Johnson (NU) ✓
1867	Henry H. Crapo (R)	Dwight May (R)	Oliver L. Spaulding (R)	William L. Stoughton (R)	Ebenezer O. Grosvenor (R)	30R, 1D, 1?	79R, 21D	Zachariah Chandler (R)	Jacob M. Howard (R)	6R	Lincoln/ Johnson (NU) ✓
1868	Henry H. Crapo (R)	Dwight May (R)	Oliver L. Spaulding (R)	William L. Stoughton (R)	Ebenezer O. Grosvenor (R)	30R, 1D, 1?	79R, 21D	Zachariah Chandler (R)	Jacob M. Howard (R)	6R	Grant/ Colfax (R) ✓
1869	Henry P. Baldwin (R)	Morgan Bates (R)	Oliver L. Spaulding (R)	Dwight May (R)	Ebenezer O. Grosvenor (R)	27R, 5D	75R, 25D	Zachariah Chandler (R)	Jacob M. Howard (R)	6R	Grant/ Colfax (R) ✓
1870	Henry P. Baldwin (R)	Morgan Bates (R)	Oliver L. Spaulding (R)	Dwight May (R)	Ebenezer O. Grosvenor (R)	27R, 5D	75R, 25D	Zachariah Chandler (R)	Jacob M. Howard (R)	6R	Grant/ Colfax (R) ✓
1871	Henry P. Baldwin (R)	Morgan Bates (R)	Daniel Striker (R)	Dwight May (R)	Victory P. Collier (R)	27R, 5D	71R, 29D	Zachariah Chandler (R)	Thomas W. Ferry (R)	5R, 1D	Grant/ Colfax (R) ✓
1872	Henry P. Baldwin (R)	Morgan Bates (R)	Daniel Striker (R)	Dwight May (R)	Victory P. Collier (R)	27R, 5D	71R, 29D	Zachariah Chandler (R)	Thomas W. Ferry (R)	5R, 1D	Grant/ Wilson (R) ✓
1873	John J. Bagley (R)	Henry H. Holt (R)	Daniel Striker (R)	Byron D. Ball (R)	Victory P. Collier (R)	31R, 1D	95R, 5D	Zachariah Chandler (R)	Thomas W. Ferry (R)	9R	Grant/ Wilson (R) ✓
1874	John J. Bagley (R)	Henry H. Holt (R)	Daniel Striker (R)	Isaac Marston (R)	Victory P. Collier (R)	31R, 1D	95R, 5D	Zachariah Chandler (R)	Thomas W. Ferry (R)	9R	Grant/ Wilson (R) ✓
1875	John J. Bagley (R)	Henry H. Holt (R)	Ebenezer G. D. Holden (R)	Andrew J. Smith (R)	William B. McCreery (R)	17R, 15D	54R, 46D	Isaac P. Christiancy (R)	Thomas W. Ferry (R)	6R, 3D	Grant/ Wilson (R) ✓
1876	John J. Bagley (R)	Henry H. Holt (R)	Ebenezer G. D. Holden (R)	Andrew J. Smith (R)	William B. McCreery (R)	17R, 15D	54R, 46D	Isaac P. Christiancy (R)	Thomas W. Ferry (R)	6R, 3D	Hayes/ Wheeler (R) ✓
1877	Charles Croswell (R)	Alonzo Sessions (R)	Ebenezer G. D. Holden (R)	Otto Kirchner (R)	William B. McCreery (R)	23R, 9D	75R, 25D	Isaac P. Christiancy (R)	Thomas W. Ferry (R)	8R, 1D	Hayes/ Wheeler (R) ✓
1878	Charles Croswell (R)	Alonzo Sessions (R)	Ebenezer G. D. Holden (R)	Otto Kirchner (R)	William B. McCreery (R)	23R, 9D	75R, 25D	Isaac P. Christiancy (R)	Thomas W. Ferry (R)	8R, 1D	Hayes/ Wheeler (R) ✓
1879	Charles Croswell (R)	Alonzo Sessions (R)	William Jenney (R)	Otto Kirchner (R)	Benjamin D. Pritchard (R)	23R, 9D	65R, 35D	Zachariah Chandler (R)	Thomas W. Ferry (R)	9R	Hayes/ Wheeler (R) ✓
1880	Charles Croswell (R)	Alonzo Sessions (R)	William Jenney (R)	Otto Kirchner (R)	Benjamin D. Pritchard (R)	23R, 9D	65R, 35D	Henry P. Baldwin (R)	Thomas W. Ferry (R)	9R	Garfield/ Arthur (R) ✓
1881	David Jerome (R)	Moreau S. Crosby (R)	William Jenney (R)	Jacob J. Van Riper (R)	Benjamin D. Pritchard (R)	30R, 2D	86R, 13D, 1I	Omar D. Conger (R)	Thomas W. Ferry (R)	9R	Garfield/ Arthur (R) ✓
1882	David Jerome (R)	Moreau S. Crosby (R)	William Jenney (R)	Jacob J. Van Riper (R)	Benjamin D. Pritchard (R)	30R, 2D	86R, 13D, 1I	Omar D. Conger (R)	Thomas W. Ferry (R)	9R	Garfield/ Arthur (R) ✓
1883	Josiah Begole (D)	Moreau S. Crosby (R)	Harry A. Conant (R)	Jacob J. Van Riper (R)	Edward H. Butler (R)	19R, 13D	62R, 38D	Omar D. Conger (R)	Thomas W. Palmer (R)	5R, 6D	Garfield/ Arthur (R) ✓
1884	Josiah Begole (D)	Moreau S. Crosby (R)	Harry A. Conant (R)	Jacob J. Van Riper (R)	Edward H. Butler (R)	19R, 13D	62R, 38D	Omar D. Conger (R)	Thomas W. Palmer (R)	5R, 6D	Blaine/ Logan (R) ✗
1885	Russell A. Alger (R)	Archibald Buttars (R)	Harry A. Conant (R)	Moses Taggart (R)	Edward H. Butler (R)	18R, 14D	52R, 48D	Omar D. Conger (R)	Thomas W. Palmer (R)	4R, 7D	Blaine/ Logan (R) ✗
1886	Russell A. Alger (R)	Archibald Buttars (R)	Harry A. Conant (R)	Moses Taggart (R)	Edward H. Butler (R)	18R, 14D	52R, 48D	Omar D. Conger (R)	Thomas W. Palmer (R)	4R, 7D	Blaine/ Logan (R) ✗
1887	Cyrus G. Luce (R)	James H. MacDonald (R)	Gilbert R. Osmun (R)	Moses Taggart (R)	George L. Maltz (R)	22R, 10D	63R, 37D	Francis B. Stockbridge (R)	Thomas W. Palmer (R)	6R, 5D	Blaine/ Logan (R) ✗
1888	Cyrus G. Luce (R)	James H. MacDonald (R)	Gilbert R. Osmun (R)	Moses Taggart (R)	George L. Maltz (R)	22R, 10D	63R, 37D	Francis B. Stockbridge (R)	Thomas W. Palmer (R)	6R, 5D	Harrison/ Morton (R) ✓
1889	Cyrus G. Luce (R)	William Ball (R)	Gilbert R. Osmun (R)	Stephen V. R. Trowbridge (R)	George L. Maltz (R)	24R, 8D	70R, 30D	Francis B. Stockbridge (R)	James McMillan (R)	9R, 2D	Harrison/ Morton (R) ✓
1890	Cyrus G. Luce (R)	William Ball (R)	Gilbert R. Osmun (R)	Benjamin W. Huston (R)	George L. Maltz (R)	24R, 8D	70R, 30D	Francis B. Stockbridge (R)	James McMillan (R)	9R, 2D	Harrison/ Morton (R) ✓
1891	Edwin B. Winans (D)	John Strong (D)	Daniel E. Soper (D)	Adolphus A. Ellis (D)	Frederick Braastad (D)	17D, 15R	55D, 45R	Francis B. Stockbridge (R)	James McMillan (R)	3R, 8D	Harrison/ Morton (R) ✓
1892	Edwin B. Winans (D)	John Strong (D)	Robert R. Blacker (D)	Adolphus A. Ellis (D)	Frederick Braastad (D)	17D, 15R	55D, 45R	Francis B. Stockbridge (R)	James McMillan (R)	3R, 8D	9 – Harrison/ Reid (R) ✗ 5 – Cleveland/ Stevenson (D) ✓
1893	John T. Rich (R)	J. Wight Giddings (R)	John W. Jochim (R) (Note: Removed from office.)	Adolphus A. Ellis (D)	Joseph F. Hambitzer (R) (Note: Removed from office)	22R, 9D, 1DP	69R, 28D, 3Pop	Francis B. Stockbridge (R)	James McMillan (R)	7R, 5D	9 – Harrison/ Reid (R) ✗ 5 – Cleveland/ Stevenson (D) ✓
1894	John T. Rich (R)	J. Wight Giddings (R)	Washington Gardner (R) (Note: Initially appointed to fill vacancy; later elected in his own right.)	Adolphus A. Ellis (D)	James M. Wilkinson (R)	22R, 9D, 1DP	69R, 28D, 3Pop	John Patton Jr. (R)	James McMillan (R)	7R, 5D	9 – Harrison/ Reid (R) ✗ 5 – Cleveland/ Stevenson (D) ✓
1895	John T. Rich (R)	Alfred Milnes (R)	Washington Gardner (R)	Fred A. Maynard (R) (Note: Indicted on 48 charges of embezzlement.)	James M. Wilkinson (R)	32R	99R, 1D	Julius C. Burrows (R)	James McMillan (R)	12R	9 – Harrison/ Reid (R) ✗ 5 – Cleveland/ Stevenson (D) ✓
1896	John T. Rich (R)	Joseph R. McLaughlin (R)	Washington Gardner (R)	Fred A. Maynard (R)	James M. Wilkinson (R)	32R	99R, 1D	Julius C. Burrows (R)	James McMillan (R)	12R	McKinley/ Hobart (R) ✓
1897	Hazen S. Pingree (R)	Thomas B. Dunstan (R)	Washington Gardner (R)	Fred A. Maynard (R)	George A. Steel (R)	26R, 6D	81R, 19D	Julius C. Burrows (R)	James McMillan (R)	10R, 2D	McKinley/ Hobart (R) ✓
1898	Hazen S. Pingree (R)	Thomas B. Dunstan (R)	Washington Gardner (R)	Fred A. Maynard (R)	George A. Steel (R)	26R, 6D	81R, 19D	Julius C. Burrows (R)	James McMillan (R)	10R, 2D	McKinley/ Hobart (R) ✓
1899	Hazen S. Pingree (R)	Orrin W. Robinson (R)	Justus Smith Stearns (R)	Horace M. Oren (R)	George A. Steel (R)	27R, 5D	92R, 8D	Julius C. Burrows (R)	James McMillan (R)	12R	McKinley/ Hobart (R) ✓

== 1900–1964 ==
Year	Executive offices							State Legislature		United States Congress			Electoral votes
Year	Governor	Lt. Governor	Sec. of State	Attorney General	Treasurer	Auditor General	Highway Comm.	State Senate	State House	U.S. Senator (Class I)	U.S. Senator (Class II)	U.S. House	Electoral votes
1900	Hazen S. Pingree (R)	Orrin W. Robinson (R)	Justus Smith Stearns (R)	Horace M. Oren (R)	George A. Steel	Roscoe D. Dix (R)	no such office	27R, 5D	92R, 8D	Julius C. Burrows (R)	James McMillan (R)	12R	McKinley/ Roosevelt (R) ✓
1901	Aaron T. Bliss (R)	Orrin W. Robinson (R)	Fred M. Warner (R)	Horace M. Oren (R)	Daniel McCoy (R)	Perry F. Powers (R)	no such office	31R, 1D	90R, 10D	Julius C. Burrows (R)	James McMillan (R)	12R	McKinley/ Roosevelt (R) ✓
1902	Aaron T. Bliss (R)	Orrin W. Robinson (R)	Fred M. Warner (R)	Horace M. Oren (R)	Daniel McCoy (R)	Perry F. Powers (R)	no such office	31R, 1D	90R, 10D	Julius C. Burrows (R)	James McMillan (R)	12R	McKinley/ Roosevelt (R) ✓
1903	Aaron T. Bliss (R)	Alexander Maitland (R)	Fred M. Warner (R)	Charles A. Blair (R)	Daniel McCoy (R)	Perry F. Powers (R)	no such office	31R, 1D	100R	Julius C. Burrows (R)	Russell A. Alger (R)	11R, 1D	McKinley/ Roosevelt (R) ✓
1904	Aaron T. Bliss (R)	Alexander Maitland (R)	Fred M. Warner (R)	Charles A. Blair (R)	Daniel McCoy (R)	Perry F. Powers (R)	no such office	31R, 1D	100R	Julius C. Burrows (R)	Russell A. Alger (R)	11R, 1D	Roosevelt/ Fairbanks (R) ✓
1905	Fred M. Warner (R)	Alexander Maitland (R)	George A. Prescott (R)	John E. Bird (R)	Frank P. Glazier (R)	James B. Bradley (R)	Horatio Earle (R)	32R	95R, 5D	Julius C. Burrows (R)	Russell A. Alger (R)	12R	Roosevelt/ Fairbanks (R) ✓
1906	Fred M. Warner (R)	Alexander Maitland (R)	George A. Prescott (R)	John E. Bird (R)	Frank P. Glazier (R)	James B. Bradley (R)	Horatio Earle (R)	32R	95R, 5D	Julius C. Burrows (R)	Russell A. Alger (R)	12R	Roosevelt/ Fairbanks (R) ✓
1907	Fred M. Warner (R)	Patrick H. Kelley (R)	George A. Prescott (R)	John E. Bird (R)	Frank P. Glazier (R)	James B. Bradley (R)	Horatio Earle (R)	32R	95R, 5D	Julius C. Burrows (R)	William Alden Smith (R)	12R	Roosevelt/ Fairbanks (R) ✓
1908	Fred M. Warner (R)	Patrick H. Kelley (R)	George A. Prescott (R)	John E. Bird (R)	John T. Rich (R)	James B. Bradley (R)	Horatio Earle (R)	32R	95R, 5D	Julius C. Burrows (R)	William Alden Smith (R)	12R	Taft/ Sherman (R) ✓
1909	Fred M. Warner (R)	Patrick H. Kelley (R)	Frederick C. Martindale (R)	John E. Bird (R)	Albert Sleeper (R)	Oramel B. Fuller (R)	Townsend A. Ely (R)	32R	98R, 2D	Julius C. Burrows (R)	William Alden Smith (R)	12R	Taft/ Sherman (R) ✓
1910	Fred M. Warner (R)	Patrick H. Kelley (R)	Frederick C. Martindale (R)	Franz C. Kuhn (R)	Albert Sleeper (R)	Oramel B. Fuller (R)	Townsend A. Ely (R)	32R	98R, 2D	Julius C. Burrows (R)	William Alden Smith (R)	12R	Taft/ Sherman (R) ✓
1911	Chase Osborn (R)	John Q. Ross (R)	Frederick C. Martindale (R)	Franz C. Kuhn (R)	Albert Sleeper (R)	Oramel B. Fuller (R)	Townsend A. Ely (R)	28R, 4D	88R, 12D	Charles E. Townsend (R)	William Alden Smith (R)	10R, 2D	Taft/ Sherman (R) ✓
1912	Chase Osborn (R)	John Q. Ross (R)	Frederick C. Martindale (R)	Roger I. Wykes (R)	Albert Sleeper (R)	Oramel B. Fuller (R)	Townsend A. Ely (R)	28R, 4D	88R, 12D	Charles E. Townsend (R)	William Alden Smith (R)	10R, 2D	Roosevelt/ Johnson (Prog) ✗
1913	Woodbridge N. Ferris (D)	John Q. Ross (R)	Frederick C. Martindale (R)	Grant Fellows (R)	John W. Harrer (R)	Oramel B. Fuller (R)	Frank F. Rogers (R)	21R, 6Prog, 5D	54R, 35D, 11Prog	Charles E. Townsend (R)	William Alden Smith (R)	10R, 2D, 2Prog	Roosevelt/ Johnson (Prog) ✗
1914	Woodbridge N. Ferris (D)	John Q. Ross (R)	Frederick C. Martindale (R)	Grant Fellows (R)	John W. Harrer (R)	Oramel B. Fuller (R)	Frank F. Rogers (R)	21R, 6Prog, 5D	54R, 35D, 11Prog	Charles E. Townsend (R)	William Alden Smith (R)	10R, 2D, 2Prog	Roosevelt/ Johnson (Prog) ✗
1915	Woodbridge N. Ferris (D)	Luren Dickinson (R)	Coleman C. Vaughan (R)	Grant Fellows (R)	John W. Harrer (R)	Oramel B. Fuller (R)	Frank F. Rogers (R)	29R, 3D	95R, 5D	Charles E. Townsend (R)	William Alden Smith (R)	11R, 2D	Roosevelt/ Johnson (Prog) ✗
1916	Woodbridge N. Ferris (D)	Luren Dickinson (R)	Coleman C. Vaughan (R)	Grant Fellows (R)	John W. Harrer (R)	Oramel B. Fuller (R)	Frank F. Rogers (R)	29R, 3D	95R, 5D	Charles E. Townsend (R)	William Alden Smith (R)	11R, 2D	Hughes/ Fairbanks (R) ✗
1917	Albert Sleeper (R)	Luren Dickinson (R)	Coleman C. Vaughan (R)	Alex J. Groesbeck (R)	Samuel Odell	Oramel B. Fuller (R)	Frank F. Rogers (R)	27R, 5D	88R, 12D	Charles E. Townsend (R)	William Alden Smith (R)	11R, 2D	Hughes/ Fairbanks (R) ✗
1918	Albert Sleeper (R)	Luren Dickinson (R)	Coleman C. Vaughan (R)	Alex J. Groesbeck (R)	Samuel Odell	Oramel B. Fuller (R)	Frank F. Rogers (R)	27R, 5D	88R, 12D	Charles E. Townsend (R)	William Alden Smith (R)	11R, 2D	Hughes/ Fairbanks (R) ✗
1919	Albert Sleeper (R)	Luren Dickinson (R)	Coleman C. Vaughan (R)	Alex J. Groesbeck (R)	Samuel Odell	Oramel B. Fuller (R)	Frank F. Rogers (R)	32R	98R, 2D	Charles E. Townsend (R)	Truman H. Newberry (R)	12R, 1D	Hughes/ Fairbanks (R) ✗
1920	Albert Sleeper (R)	Luren Dickinson (R)	Coleman C. Vaughan (R)	Alex J. Groesbeck (R)	Frank E. Gorman (R)	Oramel B. Fuller (R)	Frank F. Rogers (R)	32R	98R, 2D	Charles E. Townsend (R)	Truman H. Newberry (R)	12R, 1D	Harding/ Coolidge (R) ✓
1921	Alex J. Groesbeck (R)	Thomas Read (R)	Charles J. DeLand (R)	Merlin Wiley (R)	Frank E. Gorman (R)	Oramel B. Fuller (R)	Frank F. Rogers (R)	32R	100R	Charles E. Townsend (R)	Truman H. Newberry (R)	13R	Harding/ Coolidge (R) ✓
1922	Alex J. Groesbeck (R)	Thomas Read (R)	Charles J. DeLand (R)	Merlin Wiley (R)	Frank E. Gorman (R)	Oramel B. Fuller (R)	Frank F. Rogers (R)	32R	100R	Charles E. Townsend (R)	Truman H. Newberry (R)	13R	Harding/ Coolidge (R) ✓
1923	Alex J. Groesbeck (R)	Thomas Read (R)	Charles J. DeLand (R)	Andrew B. Dougherty (R)	Frank E. Gorman (R)	Oramel B. Fuller (R)	Frank F. Rogers (R)	32R	95R, 5D	Woodbridge N. Ferris (D)	James Couzens (R)	12R, 1D	Harding/ Coolidge (R) ✓
1924	Alex J. Groesbeck (R)	Thomas Read (R)	Charles J. DeLand (R)	Andrew B. Dougherty (R)	Frank E. Gorman (R)	Oramel B. Fuller (R)	Frank F. Rogers (R)	32R	95R, 5D	Woodbridge N. Ferris (D)	James Couzens (R)	12R, 1D	Coolidge/ Dawes (R) ✓
1925	Alex J. Groesbeck (R)	George W. Welsh (R)	Charles J. DeLand (R)	Andrew B. Dougherty (R)	Frank D. McKay (Note: Indicted for bribery in 1994 but the case ended when the star witness, Sen. Warren G. Hooper was murdered.)	Oramel B. Fuller (R)	Frank F. Rogers (R)	32R	100R	Woodbridge N. Ferris (D)	James Couzens (R)	13R	Coolidge/ Dawes (R) ✓
1926	Alex J. Groesbeck (R)	George W. Welsh (R)	Charles J. DeLand (R)	Clare Retan (R)	Frank D. McKay	Oramel B. Fuller (R)	Frank F. Rogers (R)	32R	100R	Woodbridge N. Ferris (D)	James Couzens (R)	13R	Coolidge/ Dawes (R) ✓
1927	Fred W. Green (R)	Luren Dickinson (R)	John S. Haggerty (R)	William W. Potter	Frank D. McKay	Oramel B. Fuller (R)	Frank F. Rogers (R)	32R	98R, 2D	Woodbridge N. Ferris (D)	James Couzens (R)	13R	Coolidge/ Dawes (R) ✓
1928	Fred W. Green (R)	Luren Dickinson (R)	John S. Haggerty (R)	Wilber M. Brucker (R)	Frank D. McKay	Oramel B. Fuller (R)	Frank F. Rogers (R)	32R	98R, 2D	Arthur Vandenberg (R)	James Couzens (R)	13R	Hoover/ Curtis (R) ✓
1929	Fred W. Green (R)	Luren Dickinson (R)	John S. Haggerty (R)	Wilber M. Brucker (R)	Frank D. McKay	Oramel B. Fuller (R)	Grover C. Dillard (R)	32R	98R, 2D	Arthur Vandenberg (R)	James Couzens (R)	13R	Hoover/ Curtis (R) ✓
1930	Fred W. Green (R)	Luren Dickinson (R)	John S. Haggerty (R)	Wilber M. Brucker (R)	Frank D. McKay	Oramel B. Fuller (R)	Grover C. Dillard (R)	32R	98R, 2D	Arthur Vandenberg (R)	James Couzens (R)	13R	Hoover/ Curtis (R) ✓
1931	Wilber M. Brucker (R)	Luren Dickinson (R)	Frank Fitzgerald (R)	Paul W. Voorhies (R)	Howard C. Lawrence (R)	Oramel B. Fuller (R)	Grover C. Dillard (R)	31R, 1D	98R, 2D	Arthur Vandenberg (R)	James Couzens (R)	13R	Hoover/ Curtis (R) ✓
1932	Wilber M. Brucker (R)	Luren Dickinson (R)	Frank Fitzgerald (R)	Paul W. Voorhies (R)	Howard C. Lawrence (R)	Oramel B. Fuller (R)	Grover C. Dillard (R)	31R, 1D	98R, 2D	Arthur Vandenberg (R)	James Couzens (R)	13R	Roosevelt/ Garner (D) ✓
1933	William Comstock (D)	Allen E. Stebbins (D)	Frank Fitzgerald (R)	Patrick H. O'Brien (D)	Theodore I. Fry (D)	John K. Stack Jr. (D)	Murray Van Wagoner (D)	17D, 15R	55D, 45R	Arthur Vandenberg (R)	James Couzens (R)	10D, 7R	Roosevelt/ Garner (D) ✓
1934	William Comstock (D)	Allen E. Stebbins (D)	Clarke W. Brown (R)	Patrick H. O'Brien (D)	Theodore I. Fry (D)	John K. Stack Jr. (D)	Murray Van Wagoner (D)	17D, 15R	55D, 45R	Arthur Vandenberg (R)	James Couzens (R)	10D, 7R	Roosevelt/ Garner (D) ✓
1935	Frank Fitzgerald (R)	Thomas Read (R)	Orville E. Atwood (R)	Harry S. Toy (R)	Theodore I. Fry (D)	John J. O'Hara (R)	Murray Van Wagoner (D)	21R, 11D	51R, 49D	Arthur Vandenberg (R)	James Couzens (R)	11R, 6D	Roosevelt/ Garner (D) ✓
1936	Frank Fitzgerald (R)	Thomas Read (R)	Orville E. Atwood (R)	David H. Crowley (R)	Theodore I. Fry (D)	John J. O'Hara (R)	Murray Van Wagoner (D)	21R, 11D	51R, 49D	Arthur Vandenberg (R)	James Couzens (R)	11R, 6D	Roosevelt/ Garner (D) ✓
1937	Frank Murphy (D)	Leo J. Nowicki (D)	Leon D. Case (D)	Raymond Wesley Starr (D)	Theodore I. Fry (D)	George T. Gundry (D)	Murray Van Wagoner (D)	17D, 15R	60D, 40R	Arthur Vandenberg (R)	Prentiss M. Brown (D)	9R, 8D	Roosevelt/ Garner (D) ✓
1938	Frank Murphy (D)	Leo J. Nowicki (D)	Leon D. Case (D)	Raymond Wesley Starr (D)	Theodore I. Fry (D)	George T. Gundry (D)	Murray Van Wagoner (D)	17D, 15R	60D, 40R	Arthur Vandenberg (R)	Prentiss M. Brown (D)	9R, 8D	Roosevelt/ Garner (D) ✓
1939	Frank Fitzgerald (R) (Note: Died in office)	Luren Dickinson (R)	Harry Kelly (R)	Thomas Read (R)	Miller Dunckel (D)	Vernon J. Brown (R)	Murray Van Wagoner (D)	23R, 9D	73R, 27D	Arthur Vandenberg (R)	Prentiss M. Brown (D)	12R, 5D	Roosevelt/ Garner (D) ✓
1939	Luren Dickinson (R)	Matilda Dodge Wilson (R)	Harry Kelly (R)	Thomas Read (R)	Miller Dunckel (D)	Vernon J. Brown (R)	Murray Van Wagoner (D)	23R, 9D	73R, 27D	Arthur Vandenberg (R)	Prentiss M. Brown (D)	12R, 5D	Roosevelt/ Garner (D) ✓
1940	Luren Dickinson (R)	Matilda Dodge Wilson (R)	Harry Kelly (R)	Thomas Read (R)	Miller Dunckel (D)	Vernon J. Brown (R)	Murray Van Wagoner (D)	23R, 9D	73R, 27D	Arthur Vandenberg (R)	Prentiss M. Brown (D)	12R, 5D	Willkie/ McNary (R) ✗
1941	Murray Van Wagoner (D)	Frank Murphy (D)	Harry Kelly (R)	Herbert J. Rushton (R)	Theodore I. Fry (D)	Vernon J. Brown (R)	G. Donald Kennedy (R)	22R, 10D	68R, 32D	Arthur Vandenberg (R)	Prentiss M. Brown (D)	11R, 6D	Willkie/ McNary (R) ✗
1942	Murray Van Wagoner (D)	Frank Murphy (D)	Harry Kelly (R)	Herbert J. Rushton (R)	Theodore I. Fry (D)	Vernon J. Brown (R)	G. Donald Kennedy (R)	22R, 10D	68R, 32D	Arthur Vandenberg (R)	Prentiss M. Brown (D)	11R, 6D	Willkie/ McNary (R) ✗
1943	Harry Kelly (R)	Eugene C. Keyes (R)	Herman H. Dignan (R)	Herbert J. Rushton (R)	D. Hale Brake (R)	Vernon J. Brown (R)	Lloyd B. Reid (D)	25R, 7D	74R, 26D	Arthur Vandenberg (R)	Homer S. Ferguson (R)	12R, 5D	Willkie/ McNary (R) ✗
1944	Harry Kelly (R)	Eugene C. Keyes (R)	Herman H. Dignan (R)	Herbert J. Rushton (R)	D. Hale Brake (R)	Vernon J. Brown (R)	Charles M. Zeigler (R)	25R, 7D	74R, 26D	Arthur Vandenberg (R)	Homer S. Ferguson (R)	12R, 5D	Roosevelt/ Truman (D) ✓
1945	Harry Kelly (R)	Vernon J. Brown (R)	Herman H. Dignan (R)	John R. Dethmers (R)	D. Hale Brake (R)	John D. Morrison (R)	Charles M. Zeigler (R)	24R, 8D	66R, 34D	Arthur Vandenberg (R)	Homer S. Ferguson (R)	11R, 6D	Roosevelt/ Truman (D) ✓
1946	Harry Kelly (R)	Vernon J. Brown (R)	Herman H. Dignan (R)	Foss O. Eldred (R)	D. Hale Brake (R)	John D. Morrison (R)	Charles M. Zeigler (R)	24R, 8D	66R, 34D	Arthur Vandenberg (R)	Homer S. Ferguson (R)	11R, 6D	Roosevelt/ Truman (D) ✓
1947	Kim Sigler (R)	Eugene C. Keyes (R)	Frederick M. Alger Jr. (R)	Eugene F. Black (R)	D. Hale Brake (R)	Murl K. Aten (R)	Charles M. Zeigler (R)	28R, 4D	95R, 5D	Arthur Vandenberg (R)	Homer S. Ferguson (R)	14R, 3D	Roosevelt/ Truman (D) ✓
1948	Kim Sigler (R)	Eugene C. Keyes (R)	Frederick M. Alger Jr. (R)	Eugene F. Black (R)	D. Hale Brake (R)	Murl K. Aten (R)	Charles M. Zeigler (R)	28R, 4D	95R, 5D	Arthur Vandenberg (R)	Homer S. Ferguson (R)	14R, 3D	Dewey/ Warren (R) ✗
1949	G. Mennen Williams (D)	John W. Connolly (D)	Frederick M. Alger Jr. (R)	Stephen John Roth (D)	D. Hale Brake (R)	Murl K. Aten (R)	Charles M. Zeigler (R)	23R, 9D	61R, 39D	Arthur Vandenberg (R)	Homer S. Ferguson (R)	13R, 4D	Dewey/ Warren (R) ✗
1950	G. Mennen Williams (D)	John W. Connolly (D)	Frederick M. Alger Jr. (R)	Stephen John Roth (D)	D. Hale Brake (R)	Murl K. Aten (R)	Charles M. Zeigler (R)	23R, 9D	61R, 39D	Arthur Vandenberg (R)	Homer S. Ferguson (R)	12R, 5D	Dewey/ Warren (R) ✗
1951	G. Mennen Williams (D)	William C. Vandenberg (R)	Frederick M. Alger Jr. (R)	Frank Millard (R)	D. Hale Brake (R)	John B. Martin (R)	Charles M. Zeigler (R)	25R, 7D	66R, 34D	Blair Moody (D)	Homer S. Ferguson (R)	12R, 5D	Dewey/ Warren (R) ✗
1952	G. Mennen Williams (D)	William C. Vandenberg (R)	Frederick M. Alger Jr. (R)	Frank Millard (R)	D. Hale Brake (R)	John B. Martin (R)	Charles M. Zeigler (R)	25R, 7D	66R, 34D	Blair Moody (D)	Homer S. Ferguson (R)	12R, 5D	Eisenhower/ Nixon (R) ✓
1953	G. Mennen Williams (D)	Clarence A. Reid (R)	Owen Cleary (R)	Frank Millard (R)	D. Hale Brake (R)	John B. Martin (R)	Charles M. Zeigler (R)	24R, 8D	66R, 34D	Charles E. Potter (R)	Homer S. Ferguson (R)	13R, 5D	Eisenhower/ Nixon (R) ✓
1954	G. Mennen Williams (D)	Clarence A. Reid (R)	Owen Cleary (R)	Frank Millard (R)	D. Hale Brake (R)	John B. Martin (R)	Charles M. Zeigler (R)	24R, 8D	66R, 34D	Charles E. Potter (R)	Homer S. Ferguson (R)	13R, 5D	Eisenhower/ Nixon (R) ✓
1955	G. Mennen Williams (D)	Philip Hart (D)	James M. Hare (D)	Thomas M. Kavanagh (D)	Sanford Brown (D)	Victor Targonski (D)	Charles M. Zeigler (R)	23R, 11D	59R, 51D	Charles E. Potter (R)	Patrick V. McNamara (D)	11R, 7D	Eisenhower/ Nixon (R) ✓
1956	G. Mennen Williams (D)	Philip Hart (D)	James M. Hare (D)	Thomas M. Kavanagh (D)	Sanford Brown (D)	Victor Targonski (D)	Charles M. Zeigler (R)	23R, 11D	59R, 51D	Charles E. Potter (R)	Patrick V. McNamara (D)	11R, 7D	Eisenhower/ Nixon (R) ✓
1957	G. Mennen Williams (D)	Philip Hart (D)	James M. Hare (D)	Thomas M. Kavanagh (D)	Sanford Brown (D)	Frank S. Szymanski (D)	John C. Mackie (D)	23R, 11D	61R, 49D	Charles E. Potter (R)	Patrick V. McNamara (D)	12R, 6D	Eisenhower/ Nixon (R) ✓
1958	G. Mennen Williams (D)	Philip Hart (D)	James M. Hare (D)	Paul L. Adams (D)	Sanford Brown (D)	Frank S. Szymanski (D)	John C. Mackie (D)	23R, 11D	61R, 49D	Charles E. Potter (R)	Patrick V. McNamara (D)	12R, 6D	Eisenhower/ Nixon (R) ✓
1959	G. Mennen Williams (D)	John Swainson (D)	James M. Hare (D)	Paul L. Adams (D)	Sanford Brown (D)	Otis M. Smith (D)	John C. Mackie (D)	22R, 12D	55R, 55D (Note: Due to a change in rules, Republicans organized the chamber on a 55-54 vote and elected a Speaker, Don R. Pears, of their party when a Democrat, Josephine Hunsinger, left for an emergency appendectomy.)	Philip Hart (D)	Patrick V. McNamara (D)	11R, 7D	Eisenhower/ Nixon (R) ✓
1960	G. Mennen Williams (D)	John Swainson (D)	James M. Hare (D)	Paul L. Adams (D)	Sanford Brown (D)	Otis M. Smith (D)	John C. Mackie (D)	22R, 12D	55R, 55D	Philip Hart (D)	Patrick V. McNamara (D)	11R, 7D	Kennedy/ Johnson (D) ✓
1961	John Swainson (D)	T. John Lesinski (D)	James M. Hare (D)	Paul L. Adams (D)	Sanford Brown (D)	Billie S. Farnum (D)	John C. Mackie (D)	22R, 12D	56R, 54D	Philip Hart (D)	Patrick V. McNamara (D)	11R, 7D	Kennedy/ Johnson (D) ✓
1962	John Swainson (D)	T. John Lesinski (D)	James M. Hare (D)	Frank J. Kelley (D)	Sanford Brown (D)	Billie S. Farnum (D)	John C. Mackie (D)	22R, 12D	56R, 54D	Philip Hart (D)	Patrick V. McNamara (D)	11R, 7D	Kennedy/ Johnson (D) ✓
1963	George W. Romney (R) (Note: Resigned to become United States Secretary of Housing and Urban Development.)	T. John Lesinski (D)	James M. Hare (D)	Frank J. Kelley (D)	Sanford Brown (D)	Billie S. Farnum (D)	John C. Mackie (D)	23R, 11D	58R, 52D	Philip Hart (D)	Patrick V. McNamara (D)	11R, 8D	Kennedy/ Johnson (D) ✓
1964	George W. Romney (R)	T. John Lesinski (D)	James M. Hare (D)	Frank J. Kelley (D)	Sanford Brown (D)	Billie S. Farnum (D)	John C. Mackie (D)	23R, 11D	58R, 52D	Philip Hart (D)	Patrick V. McNamara (D)	11R, 8D	Johnson/ Humphrey (D) ✓

In 1963, the Michigan Constitution was rewritten, modifying the statewide elected positions.

== 1965–present ==
Year	Executive offices				State Legislature		United States Congress			Electoral votes
Year	Governor	Lt. Governor	Sec. of State	Attorney General	State Senate	State House	U.S. Senator (Class I)	U.S. Senator (Class II)	U.S. House	Electoral votes
1965	George W. Romney (R)	William Milliken (R)	James M. Hare (D)	Frank J. Kelley (D)	23D, 15R	73D, 37R	Philip Hart (D)	Patrick V. McNamara (D)	12D, 7R	Johnson/ Humphrey (D) ✓
1966	George W. Romney (R)	William Milliken (R)	James M. Hare (D)	Frank J. Kelley (D)	23D, 15R	73D, 37R	Philip Hart (D)	Robert P. Griffin (R)	12D, 7R	Johnson/ Humphrey (D) ✓
1967	George W. Romney (R)	William Milliken (R)	James M. Hare (D)	Frank J. Kelley (D)	20R, 18D (Note: Effective with the Constitution of 1964, senators started to be elected to four-year terms, all at the same election. This went into effect at the 1966 election.)	55R, 55D (Note: The 1966 Midterms yielded a 55-55 split, but the Republicans prevailed on a Democrat to skip on the vote for Speaker and be able to organize the chamber on a 55-54 vote due to a rule change, like was done in 1959. Robert E. Waldron became Speaker, and the Republicans ran the chamber. The Democrat who skipped the vote was E. D. O'Brien.)	Philip Hart (D)	Robert P. Griffin (R)	12R, 7D	Johnson/ Humphrey (D) ✓
1968	George W. Romney (R)	William Milliken (R)	James M. Hare (D)	Frank J. Kelley (D)	20R, 18D	56R, 54D (Note: A special election in May 1967 gave Republicans the majority in the state House. It was caused by the death of Democrat Joseph J. Kowalski, and was won by Republican Anthony C. Licata.)	Philip Hart (D)	Robert P. Griffin (R)	12R, 7D	Humphrey/ Muskie (D) ✗
1969	William Milliken (R) (Note: As lieutenant governor, acted as governor for unexpired term and was later elected in his own right.)	vacant	James M. Hare (D)	Frank J. Kelley (D)	20R, 18D	57D, 53R	Philip Hart (D)	Robert P. Griffin (R)	12R, 7D	Humphrey/ Muskie (D) ✗
1970	William Milliken (R)	Thomas F. Schweigert (R)	James M. Hare (D)	Frank J. Kelley (D)	20R, 18D	57D, 53R	Philip Hart (D)	Robert P. Griffin (R)	12R, 7D	Humphrey/ Muskie (D) ✗
1971	William Milliken (R)	James H. Brickley (R)	Richard H. Austin (D)	Frank J. Kelley (D)	19R, 19D (Note: The Republicans organized the Senate with the tie-breaking vote of the Lt. Governor.)	58D, 52R	Philip Hart (D)	Robert P. Griffin (R)	12R, 7D	Humphrey/ Muskie (D) ✗
1972	William Milliken (R)	James H. Brickley (R)	Richard H. Austin (D)	Frank J. Kelley (D)	19R, 19D	58D, 52R	Philip Hart (D)	Robert P. Griffin (R)	12R, 7D	Nixon/ Agnew (R) ✓
1973	William Milliken (R)	James H. Brickley (R)	Richard H. Austin (D)	Frank J. Kelley (D)	19R, 19D	60D, 50R	Philip Hart (D)	Robert P. Griffin (R)	12R, 7D	Nixon/ Agnew (R) ✓
1974	William Milliken (R)	James H. Brickley (R)	Richard H. Austin (D)	Frank J. Kelley (D)	19R, 19D	60D, 50R	Philip Hart (D)	Robert P. Griffin (R)	11R, 8D (Note: Donald Riegle switched parties from Republican to Democratic on February 27, 1973.)	Nixon/ Agnew (R) ✓
1975	William Milliken (R)	James Damman (R)	Richard H. Austin (D)	Frank J. Kelley (D)	24D, 14R	66D, 44R	Philip Hart (D)	Robert P. Griffin (R)	12D, 7R	Nixon/ Agnew (R) ✓
1976	William Milliken (R)	James Damman (R)	Richard H. Austin (D)	Frank J. Kelley (D)	24D, 14R	66D, 44R	Philip Hart (D)	Robert P. Griffin (R)	12D, 7R	Ford/ Dole (R) ✗
1977	William Milliken (R)	James Damman (R)	Richard H. Austin (D)	Frank J. Kelley (D)	24D, 14R	68D, 42R	Donald Riegle (D)	Robert P. Griffin (R)	11D, 8R	Ford/ Dole (R) ✗
1978	William Milliken (R)	James Damman (R)	Richard H. Austin (D)	Frank J. Kelley (D)	24D, 14R	68D, 42R	Donald Riegle (D)	Robert P. Griffin (R)	11D, 8R	Ford/ Dole (R) ✗
1979	William Milliken (R)	James H. Brickley (R)	Richard H. Austin (D)	Frank J. Kelley (D)	24D, 14R	70D, 40R	Donald Riegle (D)	Carl Levin (D)	13D, 6R	Ford/ Dole (R) ✗
1980	William Milliken (R)	James H. Brickley (R)	Richard H. Austin (D)	Frank J. Kelley (D)	24D, 14R	70D, 40R	Donald Riegle (D)	Carl Levin (D)	13D, 6R	Reagan/ Bush (R) ✓
1981	William Milliken (R)	James H. Brickley (R)	Richard H. Austin (D)	Frank J. Kelley (D)	24D, 14R	64D, 46R	Donald Riegle (D)	Carl Levin (D)	12D, 7R	Reagan/ Bush (R) ✓
1982	William Milliken (R)	James H. Brickley (R)	Richard H. Austin (D)	Frank J. Kelley (D)	24D, 14R	64D, 46R	Donald Riegle (D)	Carl Levin (D)	12D, 7R	Reagan/ Bush (R) ✓
1983	James J. Blanchard (D)	Martha Griffiths (D)	Richard H. Austin (D)	Frank J. Kelley (D)	20D, 18R	63D, 47R	Donald Riegle (D)	Carl Levin (D)	12D, 6R	Reagan/ Bush (R) ✓
1984	James J. Blanchard (D)	Martha Griffiths (D)	Richard H. Austin (D)	Frank J. Kelley (D)	20R, 18D (Note: Two Democratic Senators, David Serotkin and Phil Mastin, were recalled after a tax hike during the legislative session earlier in the year. The recalls flipped the chamber to the Republicans.)	63D, 47R	Donald Riegle (D)	Carl Levin (D)	12D, 6R	Reagan/ Bush (R) ✓
1985	James J. Blanchard (D)	Martha Griffiths (D)	Richard H. Austin (D)	Frank J. Kelley (D)	20R, 18D	57D, 53R	Donald Riegle (D)	Carl Levin (D)	11D, 7R	Reagan/ Bush (R) ✓
1986	James J. Blanchard (D)	Martha Griffiths (D)	Richard H. Austin (D)	Frank J. Kelley (D)	20R, 18D	57D, 53R	Donald Riegle (D)	Carl Levin (D)	11D, 7R	Reagan/ Bush (R) ✓
1987	James J. Blanchard (D)	Martha Griffiths (D)	Richard H. Austin (D)	Frank J. Kelley (D)	20R, 18D	64D, 46R	Donald Riegle (D)	Carl Levin (D)	11D, 7R	Reagan/ Bush (R) ✓
1988	James J. Blanchard (D)	Martha Griffiths (D)	Richard H. Austin (D)	Frank J. Kelley (D)	20R, 18D	64D, 46R	Donald Riegle (D)	Carl Levin (D)	11D, 7R	Bush/ Quayle (R) ✓
1989	James J. Blanchard (D)	Martha Griffiths (D)	Richard H. Austin (D)	Frank J. Kelley (D)	20R, 18D	61D, 49R	Donald Riegle (D)	Carl Levin (D)	11D, 7R	Bush/ Quayle (R) ✓
1990	James J. Blanchard (D)	Martha Griffiths (D)	Richard H. Austin (D)	Frank J. Kelley (D)	20R, 18D	61D, 49R	Donald Riegle (D)	Carl Levin (D)	11D, 7R	Bush/ Quayle (R) ✓
1991	John Engler (R)	Connie Binsfeld (R)	Richard H. Austin (D)	Frank J. Kelley (D)	20R, 18D	61D, 49R	Donald Riegle (D)	Carl Levin (D)	11D, 7R	Bush/ Quayle (R) ✓
1992	John Engler (R)	Connie Binsfeld (R)	Richard H. Austin (D)	Frank J. Kelley (D)	20R, 18D	61D, 49R	Donald Riegle (D)	Carl Levin (D)	11D, 7R	Clinton/ Gore (D) ✓
1993	John Engler (R)	Connie Binsfeld (R)	Richard H. Austin (D)	Frank J. Kelley (D)	22R, 16D	55R, 55D (Note: A power-sharing agreement was negotiated between the Democrats and Republicans to control the chamber.)	Donald Riegle (D)	Carl Levin (D)	10D, 6R	Clinton/ Gore (D) ✓
1994	John Engler (R)	Connie Binsfeld (R)	Richard H. Austin (D)	Frank J. Kelley (D)	22R, 16D	55R, 55D	Donald Riegle (D)	Carl Levin (D)	10D, 6R	Clinton/ Gore (D) ✓
1995	John Engler (R)	Connie Binsfeld (R)	Candice Miller (R)	Frank J. Kelley (D)	22R, 16D	56R, 54D	Spencer Abraham (R)	Carl Levin (D)	9D, 7R	Clinton/ Gore (D) ✓
1996	John Engler (R)	Connie Binsfeld (R)	Candice Miller (R)	Frank J. Kelley (D)	22R, 16D	56R, 54D	Spencer Abraham (R)	Carl Levin (D)	9D, 7R	Clinton/ Gore (D) ✓
1997	John Engler (R)	Connie Binsfeld (R)	Candice Miller (R)	Frank J. Kelley (D)	22R, 16D	52R, 58D	Spencer Abraham (R)	Carl Levin (D)	10D, 6R	Clinton/ Gore (D) ✓
1998	John Engler (R)	Connie Binsfeld (R)	Candice Miller (R)	Frank J. Kelley (D)	22R, 16D	52R, 58D	Spencer Abraham (R)	Carl Levin (D)	10D, 6R	Clinton/ Gore (D) ✓
1999	John Engler (R)	Dick Posthumus (R)	Candice Miller (R)	Jennifer Granholm (D)	23R, 15D	58R, 52D	Spencer Abraham (R)	Carl Levin (D)	10D, 6R	Clinton/ Gore (D) ✓
2000	John Engler (R)	Dick Posthumus (R)	Candice Miller (R)	Jennifer Granholm (D)	23R, 15D	58R, 52D	Spencer Abraham (R)	Carl Levin (D)	10D, 6R	Gore/ Lieberman (D) ✗
2001	John Engler (R)	Dick Posthumus (R)	Candice Miller (R)	Jennifer Granholm (D)	23R, 15D	59R, 51D	Debbie Stabenow (D)	Carl Levin (D)	9D, 7R	Gore/ Lieberman (D) ✗
2002	John Engler (R)	Dick Posthumus (R)	Candice Miller (R)	Jennifer Granholm (D)	23R, 15D	59R, 51D	Debbie Stabenow (D)	Carl Levin (D)	9D, 7R	Gore/ Lieberman (D) ✗
2003	Jennifer Granholm (D)	John D. Cherry (D)	Terri Lynn Land (R)	Mike Cox (R)	22R, 16D	63R, 47D	Debbie Stabenow (D)	Carl Levin (D)	9R, 6D	Gore/ Lieberman (D) ✗
2004	Jennifer Granholm (D)	John D. Cherry (D)	Terri Lynn Land (R)	Mike Cox (R)	22R, 16D	63R, 47D	Debbie Stabenow (D)	Carl Levin (D)	9R, 6D	Kerry/ Edwards (D) ✗
2005	Jennifer Granholm (D)	John D. Cherry (D)	Terri Lynn Land (R)	Mike Cox (R)	22R, 16D	58R, 52D	Debbie Stabenow (D)	Carl Levin (D)	9R, 6D	Kerry/ Edwards (D) ✗
2006	Jennifer Granholm (D)	John D. Cherry (D)	Terri Lynn Land (R)	Mike Cox (R)	22R, 16D	58R, 52D	Debbie Stabenow (D)	Carl Levin (D)	9R, 6D	Kerry/ Edwards (D) ✗
2007	Jennifer Granholm (D)	John D. Cherry (D)	Terri Lynn Land (R)	Mike Cox (R)	21R, 17D	58D, 52R	Debbie Stabenow (D)	Carl Levin (D)	9R, 6D	Kerry/ Edwards (D) ✗
2008	Jennifer Granholm (D)	John D. Cherry (D)	Terri Lynn Land (R)	Mike Cox (R)	21R, 17D	58D, 52R	Debbie Stabenow (D)	Carl Levin (D)	9R, 6D	Obama/ Biden (D) ✓
2009	Jennifer Granholm (D)	John D. Cherry (D)	Terri Lynn Land (R)	Mike Cox (R)	21R, 16D (Note: Sen. Mark Schauer resigned his 19th District seat to take office as a member of the U.S. House of Representatives.)	67D, 43R	Debbie Stabenow (D)	Carl Levin (D)	8D, 7R	Obama/ Biden (D) ✓
2010	Jennifer Granholm (D)	John D. Cherry (D)	Terri Lynn Land (R)	Mike Cox (R)	22R, 16D (Note: Mike Nofs won the special election to take Schauer's seat, flipping the seat to the Republicans.)	67D, 43R	Debbie Stabenow (D)	Carl Levin (D)	8D, 7R	Obama/ Biden (D) ✓
2011	Rick Snyder (R)	Brian Calley (R)	Ruth Johnson (R)	Bill Schuette (R)	26R, 12D	63R, 47D	Debbie Stabenow (D)	Carl Levin (D)	9R, 6D	Obama/ Biden (D) ✓
2012	Rick Snyder (R)	Brian Calley (R)	Ruth Johnson (R)	Bill Schuette (R)	26R, 12D	64R, 46D (Note: Rep. Roy Schmidt switched parties from Democratic to Republican on May 15, 2012.)	Debbie Stabenow (D)	Carl Levin (D)	9R, 6D	Obama/ Biden (D) ✓
2013	Rick Snyder (R)	Brian Calley (R)	Ruth Johnson (R)	Bill Schuette (R)	26R, 12D	59R, 51D	Debbie Stabenow (D)	Carl Levin (D)	9R, 5D	Obama/ Biden (D) ✓
2014	Rick Snyder (R)	Brian Calley (R)	Ruth Johnson (R)	Bill Schuette (R)	26R, 12D	59R, 51D	Debbie Stabenow (D)	Carl Levin (D)	9R, 5D	Obama/ Biden (D) ✓
2015	Rick Snyder (R)	Brian Calley (R)	Ruth Johnson (R)	Bill Schuette (R)	27R, 11D	63R, 47D	Debbie Stabenow (D)	Gary Peters (D)	9R, 5D	Obama/ Biden (D) ✓
2016	Rick Snyder (R)	Brian Calley (R)	Ruth Johnson (R)	Bill Schuette (R)	27R, 11D	63R, 47D	Debbie Stabenow (D)	Gary Peters (D)	9R, 5D	Trump/ Pence (R) ✓
2017	Rick Snyder (R)	Brian Calley (R)	Ruth Johnson (R)	Bill Schuette (R)	27R, 11D	63R, 47D	Debbie Stabenow (D)	Gary Peters (D)	9R, 5D	Trump/ Pence (R) ✓
2018	Rick Snyder (R)	Brian Calley (R)	Ruth Johnson (R)	Bill Schuette (R)	27R, 11D	63R, 47D	Debbie Stabenow (D)	Gary Peters (D)	9R, 5D	Trump/ Pence (R) ✓
2019	Gretchen Whitmer (D)	Garlin Gilchrist (D)	Jocelyn Benson (D)	Dana Nessel (D)	22R, 16D	58R, 52D	Debbie Stabenow (D)	Gary Peters (D)	7R, 7D	Trump/ Pence (R) ✓
2019	Gretchen Whitmer (D)	Garlin Gilchrist (D)	Jocelyn Benson (D)	Dana Nessel (D)	22R, 16D	58R, 52D	Debbie Stabenow (D)	Gary Peters (D)	7D, 6R, 1I/L (Note: U.S. Rep. Justin Amash switched parties from Republican to Independent on July 4, 2019, then became a Libertarian from April 2020 until the end of his term.)	Trump/ Pence (R) ✓
2020	Gretchen Whitmer (D)	Garlin Gilchrist (D)	Jocelyn Benson (D)	Dana Nessel (D)	22R, 16D	58R, 52D	Debbie Stabenow (D)	Gary Peters (D)	7D, 6R, 1I/L	Biden/ Harris (D) ✓
2021	Gretchen Whitmer (D)	Garlin Gilchrist (D)	Jocelyn Benson (D)	Dana Nessel (D)	22R, 16D	58R, 52D	Debbie Stabenow (D)	Gary Peters (D)	7R, 7D	Biden/ Harris (D) ✓
2022	Gretchen Whitmer (D)	Garlin Gilchrist (D)	Jocelyn Benson (D)	Dana Nessel (D)	22R, 16D	58R, 52D	Debbie Stabenow (D)	Gary Peters (D)	7R, 7D	Biden/ Harris (D) ✓
2022	Gretchen Whitmer (D)	Garlin Gilchrist (D)	Jocelyn Benson (D)	Dana Nessel (D)	22R, 16D	57R, 53D (Note: Carol Glanville won a special election in the 74th district on May 3, 2022, flipping the seat from Republican to Democratic.)	Debbie Stabenow (D)	Gary Peters (D)	7R, 7D	Biden/ Harris (D) ✓
2023	Gretchen Whitmer (D)	Garlin Gilchrist (D)	Jocelyn Benson (D)	Dana Nessel (D)	20D, 18R	56D, 54R	Debbie Stabenow (D)	Gary Peters (D)	7D, 6R	Biden/ Harris (D) ✓
2024	Gretchen Whitmer (D)	Garlin Gilchrist (D)	Jocelyn Benson (D)	Dana Nessel (D)	20D, 18R	56D, 54R	Debbie Stabenow (D)	Gary Peters (D)	7D, 6R	Trump/ Vance (R) ✓
2025	Gretchen Whitmer (D)	Garlin Gilchrist (D)	Jocelyn Benson (D)	Dana Nessel (D)	20D, 18R	58R, 52D	Elissa Slotkin (D)	Gary Peters (D)	7R, 6D	Trump/ Vance (R) ✓
2026	Gretchen Whitmer (D)	Garlin Gilchrist (D)	Jocelyn Benson (D)	Dana Nessel (D)	20D, 18R	58R, 52D	Elissa Slotkin (D)	Gary Peters (D)	7R, 6D	Trump/ Vance (R) ✓
2027	Jocelyn Benson (D)	Winnie Brinks (D)	Garlin Gilchrist (D)	Eli Savit (D)	23D, 15R	63D, 47R	Elissa Slotkin (D)	Abdul El-Sayed (D)	9D, 4R	Trump/ Vance (R) ✓

Key to party colors and abbreviations for elected officials
Democratic (D)	National Union (NU)	Progressive (Prog)	Republican (R)	Whig (W)

== See also ==
- Politics in Michigan
- Elections in Michigan
