= Joseph F. Hambitzer =

American politician

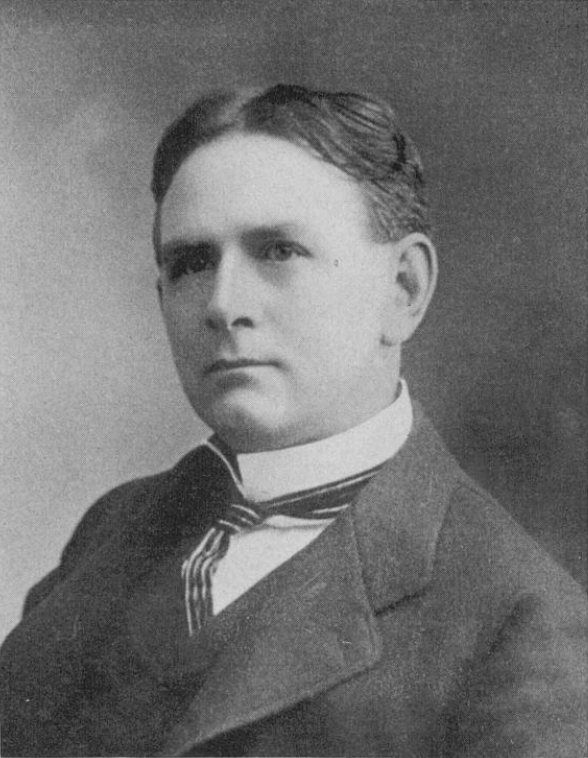

Michigan State Treasurer
- In office 1893 – March 20, 1894
- Governor: John T. Rich
- Preceded by: Frederick Braastad
- Succeeded by: James M. Wilkinson

Personal details
- Born: December 13, 1856 Fond du Lac, Wisconsin, U.S.
- Died: December 29, 1926 (aged 70) Hancock, Michigan, U.S.
- Party: Republican
- Spouse: Emma Nichols (m. 1880)
- Education: read law

Joseph F. Hambitzer (December 13, 1856 – December 29, 1926) was an American politician and lawyer. He was elected Michigan State Treasurer in 1892. He served from 1893 to March 20, 1894, when he was removed from office by Governor John T. Rich for gross neglect of duty.

== Biography ==
Joseph F. Hambitzer was born on December 13, 1856 in Fond du Lac, Wisconsin. His father, William Hambitzer, was a physician from Germany. When Hambitzer was young, the family moved to British Hollow, where he received a common school education. In the early 1870s, Hambitzer moved to Hancock, Michigan. There, he worked at a post office.

On August 25, 1880, Hambitzer married Emma Nichols. The couple had two daughters, Blanche and Mabel. Hambitzer was an Episcopalian. He was a Freemason, an Elk, and a member of the Knights of Pythias.

For two years, starting in 1884, he began to read law with the firm Chandler, Grant & Gray. In 1886, Hambitzer was elected Houghton County treasurer. He was re-elected in 1888. Starting in 1890, Hambitzer served as cashier for the Superior Savings Bank until his resignation in 1894.

=== Michigan State Treasurer ===
Hambitzer was nominated by acclamation for the office of state treasurer at the Republican State Convention in July 1892. Other candidates for state treasurer named at the convention included Daniel McCoy, George Spalding, Joseph B. Moore, and Millard F. Contrell. In the November 1892 general election, Hambitzer defeated the Democratic nominee Frederick Marvin.

As state treasurer, Hambitzer was an ex officio member of the state board of canvassers, along with the commissioner of the state land office and secretary of state. In April 1893, a state constitutional amendment was voted on by the people, proposing an increase in salary for various state officials. While initial results showed the amendment succeeded by a slim majority, it was discovered in January 1894 that there had been an error in canvassing the results. In reality, the amendment had failed to pass. On February 19, Governor John T. Rich ordered the removal of Treasurer Hambitzer, Secretary of State John W. Jochim, and Land Commissioner John G. Berry from office, on grounds of gross neglect of duty. Though Rich ordered the removal, he did not appoint replacements, as he awaited a state Supreme Court ruling in regard to the removal.

In February 1894, Hambitzer and nine other men were indicted by grand jury. Hambitzer had been indicted for felonious false record keeping, conspiracy, and willful neglect of duty. On March 20, the Michigan Supreme Court ruled in favor of Governor Rich, affirming that he had the authority to remove Hambitzer, Jochim, and Berry from office. The same day, Governor Rich removed the officials and appointed their replacements. Hambitzer was replaced as state treasurer by James M. Wilkinson.

In December 1896, the prosecution dropped the cases against Hambitzer and several others involved in the scandal.

=== Later life and career ===
Following his removal from office, Hambitzer finished studying law in the office of Ball & Ball in Marquette. He was admitted to the bar on March 6, 1895. He then moved to Houghton, where he practiced law and served as municipal attorney.

By December 1896, after the election of Governor Hazen S. Pingree, Hambitzer sought gubernatorial appointment as commissioner of mineral statistics. He withdrew his attempt at appointment by March 1897. In 1897, Hambitzer was appointed deputy oil inspector. He was reappointed in 1899.

In 1896, Hambitzer unsuccessfully sought the nomination at the Republican Houghton County convention for probate judge. In 1902, he unsuccessfully sought the Republican nomination for Houghton County prosecuting attorney. In 1911, Hambitzer was defeated in a Republican primary election for a circuit judge nomination. In 1914, he was defeated in the Republican primary election for Houghton County prosecuting attorney.

Hambitzer died at his brother-in-law's house in Hancock on December 29, 1926, after a brief period of illness.
