= Daniel McCoy =

Daniel McCoy may refer to:

- Colt McCoy (Daniel McCoy, born 1986), National Football League quarterback
- Dan McCoy (born 1978), American comedian
- Dan McCoy (sledge hockey) (born 1994), American ice hockey player
- Daniel McCoy (politician) (1845–1908), American politician in Michigan
- Danny McCoy, fictional character on the television show Las Vegas
- Daniel McCoy, son of the mutineer William McCoy
