= William W. Andrus =

American politician (1821–1910)

Member of the Michigan Senate from the 20th district
- In office April 20, 1881 – December 31, 1882
- Preceded by: John T. Rich
- Succeeded by: Alonzo Thompson Frisbee

Personal details
- Born: July 25, 1821 Middlebury, New York, U.S.
- Died: August 28, 1910 (aged 89) Utica, Michigan, U.S.
- Party: Republican

William W. Andrus (July 25, 1821 – August 28, 1910) was an American politician.

== Early life ==
Andrus was born on July 25, 1821, in Middlebury, New York. In 1822, Andrus moved to Macomb County, Michigan Territory, with his father.

== Career ==
Andrus was a physician, a surgeon, and a pharmacist. He was among the earliest physicians in Macomb County. In 1861, Andrus served as postmaster of Utica, Michigan. In 1867, Andrus served as a delegate from Macomb County in the Michigan constitutional convention. Under President Ulysses S. Grant, Andrus served as Assessor of Internal Revenue in the 5th congressional district. In 1880, Andrus served as the treasurer of Shelby Township, Michigan.

On March 21, 1881, State Senator John T. Rich resigned to fill the vacancy left in the United States House of Representatives by Congressman Omar D. Conger's resignation. By March 31, Andrus was nominated by the Republicans to fill the vacancy in the state senate left by Rich's resignation, and the Democrats had nominated John N. Mellen of Romeo. In April, Andrus was admitted to the state senate and sworn in. He served in this position until 1882.

In 1895, Andrus was appointed by Governor John T. Rich to the Macomb County jury commission for a term of two years.

== Personal life ==
By October 7, 1898, Andrus' wife had died.

== Death ==
Andrus died on August 28, 1910, in his Utica home.
