= James M. Wilkinson =

American politician

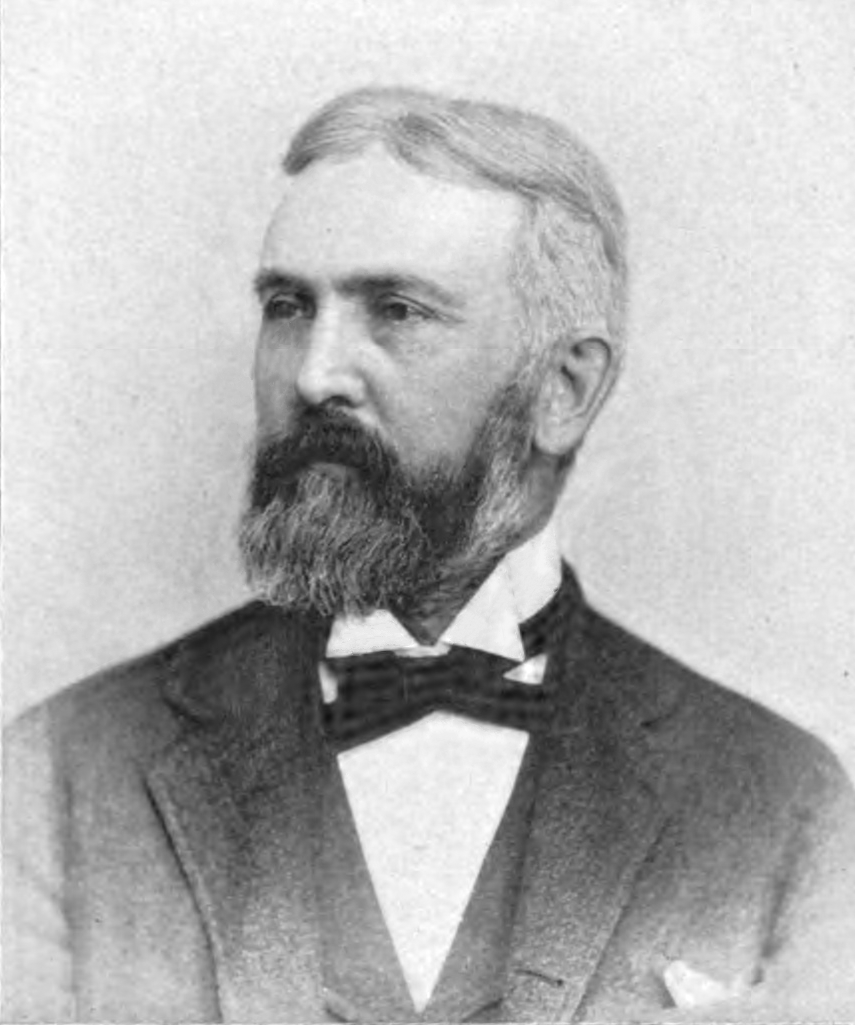

Michigan State Treasurer
- In office March 20, 1894 – 1896
- Governor: John T. Rich
- Preceded by: Joseph F. Hambitzer
- Succeeded by: George A. Steel

Personal details
- Born: November 9, 1838 Novi, Michigan
- Died: January 24, 1898 (aged 59) Marquette, Michigan
- Party: Republican
- Education: University of Michigan

James Milton Wilkinson (November 9, 1838 – January 24, 1898) was a Michigan politician.

== Early life and education ==
Wilkinson was born on January 24, 1838, in Novi, Michigan. In his early life, he lived on a farm. He attended district school, and was prepared for college by a professor at the Ypsilanti Union Seminary. In the fall of 1860, Wilkinson first attended the University of Michigan's literary department. In 1862, he entered the university's law department, from which he graduated in 1864.

== Career ==
Wilkinson moved to Marquette, Michigan to practice law with Henry D. Smith. He abandoned the law practice in 1873 to get involved in the banking business. Wilkinson held the office of Receiver of Public Money at the United States Land Office in Marquette for sixteen years, from around 1873 to 1889. Wilkinson was appointed by Governor Cyrus G. Luce to a commission to select the location of the Upper Peninsula State Prison. He then served on the first board of control of the prison.

On March 20, 1894, Joseph F. Hambitzer was removed as state treasurer. That same day, Wilkinson was appointed by Governor John T. Rich to fill the vacancy. The following November, Wilkinson was elected to continue serving as state treasurer until 1896. Wilkinson was a Republican.

== Death ==
On January 24, 1898, Wilkinson died of bowel problems in his home in Marquette. Shortly before his death, Wilkinson gave orders to close his bank, and then assigned his son and son-in-law with the task of paying back his creditors in full.

Political offices
Preceded by Joseph F. Hambitzer	Treasurer of Michigan; 1894–1896	Succeeded by George A. Steel
