= Adolphus A. Ellis =

American politician from Michigan (1848–1921)

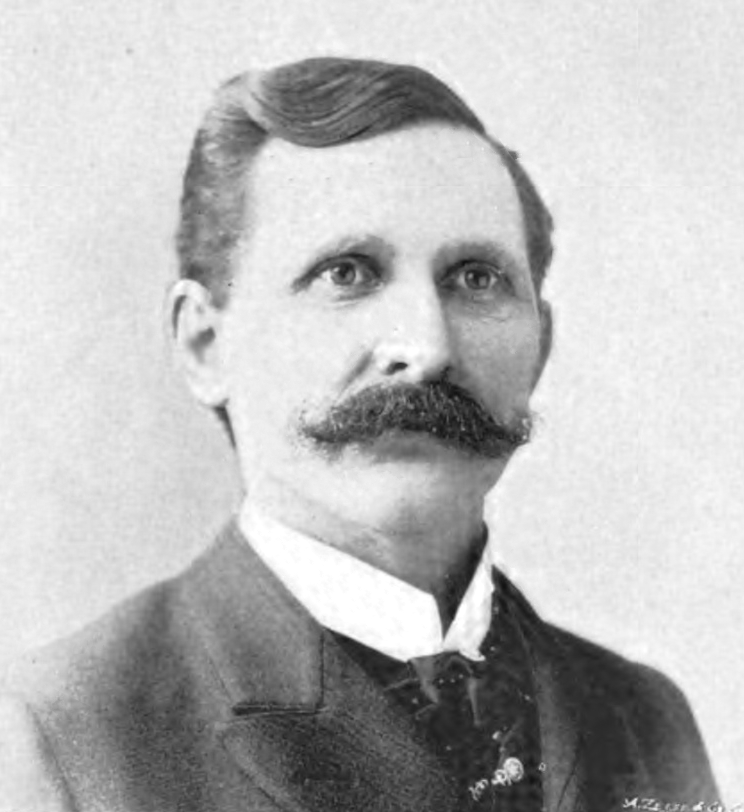

22nd Michigan Attorney General
- In office 1891–1895
- Governor: Edwin Winans; John T. Rich
- Preceded by: Benjamin W. Huston
- Succeeded by: Fred A. Maynard

Mayor of Ionia
- In office 1890–1891
- In office 1897–1899

Prosecuting Attorney for Ionia County
- In office 1884–1888

Personal details
- Born: April 5, 1848 Vermontville, Michigan, U.S.
- Died: April 25, 1921 (aged 73) Grand Rapids, Michigan, U.S.
- Party: Republican (1866-1876); National Labor Party (1877-1888); Greenback Party (1888-1889); Democratic (1890-1921)
- Children: 2
- Education: Olivet College

Adolphus Augustus Ellis (April 5, 1848 – April 25, 1921) was an American lawyer and politician who served as the 22nd Michigan Attorney General as a member of the Democratic party from 1891 to 1895.

== Early life ==
Adolphus Augustus Ellis was born in Vermontville, Michigan on April 5, 1848. In his youth, Ellis would work on his father's farm during the summer season while attending district school in the winter. From 1864 to 1865, he attended Union school in Charlotte. Ellis attempted to enlist into the 5th Michigan Cavalry Regiment in March 1865, but was denied due to his age. Following this, Ellis left for Iowa where he studied for a full year before managing a large farm until his return to Michigan in 1868. Upon his return, Ellis was employed in hardwood lumbering and enrolled at Olivet College in Olivet after acquiring sufficient funds in 1869. He graduated in 1872 and went on to take a teaching job while studying law in his free time. Ellis was admitted to the Michigan bar in January 1876 and practiced law in Muir until 1881. Ellis married Mattie N. Nichols (1849-1931) in 1874 and went on to have two children. The couple moved back to Ionia in 1881.

== Political career ==
Adolphus Augustus Ellis was first elected as Prosecuting Attorney for Ionia County in 1884 and re-elected in 1886. Although he had previously served as a delegate to the Chicago labor convention in 1880. He was a candidate for the Greenback Party in the Michigan Attorney General election of 1888, but lost to Republican nominee Stephen V. R. Trowbridge. In the spring of 1890, Ellis was elected Mayor of Ionia, winning re-election the following year. Ellis launched another bid for the office of Michigan Attorney General during the election of 1890, this time on the Democratic ticket. Ellis defeated Republican nominee and incumbent Attorney General Benjamin W. Huston and was re-elected on November 8, 1892, against Republican nominee Gerritt J. Diekema by a margin of 1,322 votes. Upon finishing his term in 1895, Ellis was again elected Mayor of Ionia in 1897 and won re-election in 1898 and 1899.

== Later life and death ==
Following the end of his term as Mayor in 1899, Ellis left politics before moving with his family to Grand Rapids in 1906, where he continued to practice law. Ellis died there on April 25, 1921.

Political offices
Preceded by	Mayor of Ionia; 1890-1891 & 1897-1899	Succeeded by
Preceded by Benjamin W. Huston	Michigan Attorney General; 1891-1895	Succeeded by Fred A. Maynard
