= Seymour B. Treadwell =

American politician

Commissioner of the State Land Office
- In office 1855–1858
- Governor: Kinsley S. Bingham
- Preceded by: Porter Kibbee
- Succeeded by: James W. Sanborn

Personal details
- Born: June 1, 1795 Bridgeport, Connecticut, U.S.
- Died: June 9, 1867 (aged 72) Jackson, Michigan, U.S.
- Party: Republican
- Other political affiliations: Liberty; Whig; Free Soil
- Spouse: Eliza Hartwell (m. 1819)

Seymour Boughton Treadwell (June 1, 1795 – June 9, 1867) was an American politician. He published a book in favor of the abolition of slavery in 1838. He was elected commissioner of the state land office on the first Republican ticket in Michigan in 1854, serving from 1855 to 1858.

== Biography ==
Seymour B. Treadwell was born on June 1, 1795, in Bridgeport, Connecticut. His father was a veteran of the American Revolutionary War. During his infancy, his parents moved to Monroe County, New York, where Treadwell got his education. He served as a teacher in New York and Ohio. Treadwell married Eliza Hartwell on December 19, 1819, in Pittsford.

Treadwell moved to Rochester, New York, in 1837. He first became known to the public when he published a book in 1838, titled American Liberties and American Slavery Morally and Politically Illustrated. The book was a rebuttal to common arguments against abolitionism.

Treadwell moved to Michigan in 1839. He took over as publisher and editor of the American Freeman, the first anti-slavery newspaper in Michigan, first established by William and Nicholas Sullivan in Jackson, in 1838. Treadwell published his first issue of the paper on September 25, 1839, under a new name, the Michigan Freeman. The paper was only published sporadically, and Treadwell gave up management in 1840, leaving the Michigan Anti-Slavery Society indebted to him.

In January 1840, at two different meetings of the Michigan Anti-Slavery Society, Treadwell opposed the forming of an anti-slavery political party, fearing it could weaken the cause. Later that year, he became a major proponent of the idea. In 1840, he supported the Liberty Party's James G. Birney for president. The same year, he ran for register of Jackson. He ran for the Michigan House of Representatives in 1841. Every year from 1841 to 1844 ran for justice of the peace of Jackson. He also ran for the Michigan State Senate in 1844.

In 1844, Treadwell lectured with Henry Bibb in support of Birney's presidential candidacy. He ran for Jackson County clerk in 1846. In 1848, Treadwell was nominated as a presidential elector by the Free Soil Party. In 1849, he was nominated by the Whig Party for the state House. He was nominated Free Soil presidential elector again in 1852.

In 1854, Treadwell was nominated at the first convention of the Michigan Republican Party as commissioner of the state land office. He won election. He was renominated in 1856, and was again elected.

After 1859, Treadwell lived in retirement on a farm near Jackson. On January 13, 1861, Treadwell's oldest son, Jerome, died of tuberculosis. Treadwell died at his residence on June 9, 1867. He was interred at Mt. Evergreen Cemetery in Jackson.
