= William Toan =

American politician

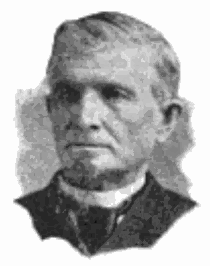

Member of the Michigan Senate from the 19th district
- In office January 1, 1889 – January 1, 1893
- Preceded by: Albert K. Roof
- Succeeded by: George A. Steel

Personal details
- Born: June 1, 1832; Vernon, New York
- Died: March 28, 1901 (aged 68)
- Party: Republican

William Toan (June 1, 1832 – March 28, 1901) was an American politician.

== Early life ==
Toan was born on June 1, 1832, in Vernon, New York. Around 1837, Toan moved to Michigan.

== Career ==
Toan was a farmer. In 1880, Toan was elected as sheriff of Ionia County, Michigan. He served two terms in this position from January 1, 1881, to 1885. Toan served as a deputy United States Marshal.

On November 6, 1888, Toan was elected to the Michigan Senate, where he represented the 19th district from January 1, 1889, to January 1, 1893. In the state senate, Toan bill proposed a bill to regulate the practice of dentistry, by requiring dental students seeking to practice in the state to graduate from a dental college that is in equal standing to that of the University of Michigan School of Dentistry. The bill passed the state senate on March 6, 1891. The bill passed the state house on May 8, 1891. The bill became law.

== Personal life ==
During his time in the legislature, Toan lived in Portland, Michigan. By the time Toan was in the legislature, he was a widower.

== Death ==
Toan died on March 28, 1901.
