= Daniel E. Soper =

American politician

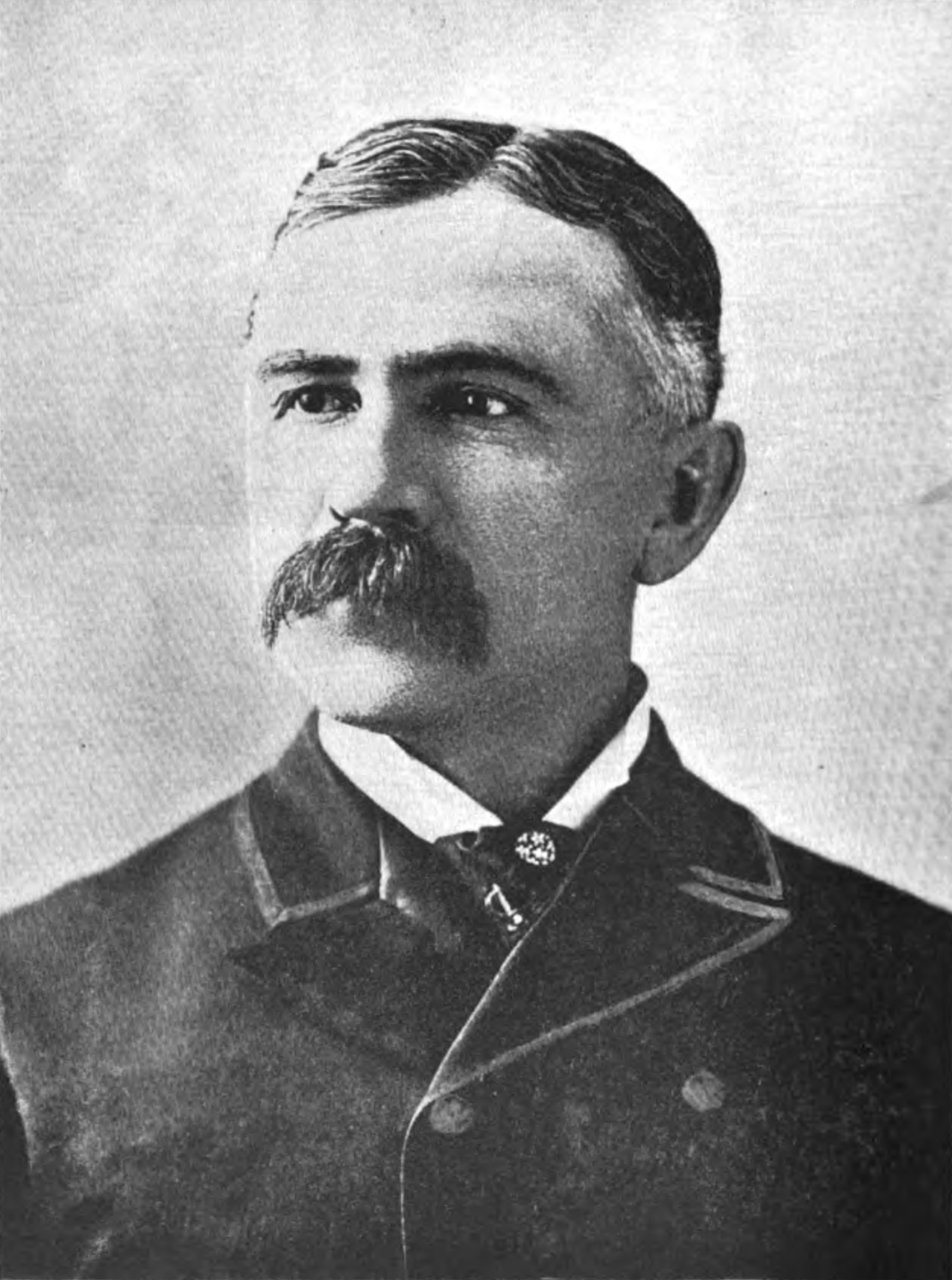

Michigan Secretary of State
- In office 1891 – December 19, 1891
- Governor: Edwin B. Winans
- Preceded by: Gilbert R. Osmun
- Succeeded by: Robert R. Blacker

Personal details
- Born: June 3, 1843 Saratoga Springs, New York
- Died: January 1923 (aged 79) Chattanooga, Tennessee
- Party: Democratic
- Spouse: Mary A. Howell (m. 1865; died 1915)

Daniel E. Soper (June 3, 1843 – January 1923) was an American politician. He served as Michigan Secretary of State in 1891, before resigning amid scandal. He later was involved with the Michigan relics fraudulent archeology scheme.

== Early life ==
Daniel E. Soper was born on June 3, 1843, in Saratoga Springs, New York. In January 1844, his father died. In 1854, his family moved to Lenawee County, Michigan. On May 22, 1865, Soper married Mary A. Howell of Hillsdale County, daughter of William T. Howell.

== Career ==
After his marriage, Soper started a drug business at Newaygo village. On April 4, 1881, the first annual Garfield Township meeting was held at Soper's drug store, of which he was one of the presiding officers. In July 1885, President Grover Cleveland made Soper the postmaster at Newaygo. Soper was Newaygo's first Democratic postmaster.

In 1890, Soper began to seek the office of Michigan auditor general. On September 10, 1890, Soper was nominated by the Democratic state convention at Grand Rapids as Michigan secretary of state. In the general election on November 4, Soper was elected with 180,855 votes, defeating Republican nominee Washington Gardner. In December 1891, a petition was filed to Governor Edwin B. Winans by Lansing Mayor Frank B. Johnson. It included a number of charges against Soper, including purchasing an unnecessarily large amount of supplies, demanding a portion of Assistant Secretary of State Louis E. Rowley's salary under threat of dismissal, and misappropriation of state funds for himself. Upon receiving this petition, Governor Winans called Soper to his office. Soper acknowledged the charges against him, and he resigned on December 19. On December 24, Soper made a statement in regard to the claims made by Mayor Johnson, and explained that he did not force Rowley to surrender a portion of his salary. Rowley confirmed the accuracy of the statement.

=== Archeological interest and fraud ===
Soper had been a collector of artifacts from Native American mounds. After resigning as secretary of state amid scandal, Soper moved to Arizona. There, he attempted to be credited with the discovery of Native American artifacts, by planting some he had already owned, and uncovering them in front of local archaeologists. However, the archaeologists could tell the artifacts were not of Southwestern origin, and Soper's attempted fraud was revealed. He then returned to Michigan.

By 1907, Soper had gotten involved with James O. Scotford, who in 1890 announced the discovery of Native American mound artifacts with written language on them in Montcalm County. The artifacts are widely considered fraudulent, as they had several indicators of recent creation, as well as an inconsistency with authentic human language, among other reasons. Scotford had since been involved with other fraudulent archeological discovers of a similar nature. By 1911, Scotford, Soper, and a Catholic pastor, James Savage, had opened over 500 mounds, and the "discovery" of many false artifacts from them. Soper and Scotford were involved in the sale of the artifacts.

By 1909, Director of the Deseret Museum James E. Talmage had found out about the Michigan relics, and on the behalf of the First Presidency of the Church of Jesus Christ of Latter Day Saints traveled to Detroit to investigate the relics. The relics had parallels with the accounts of the Book of Mormon. While initially Talmage believed the relics to be genuine, by 1911, his investigations had convinced him that they were fraudulent. Talmage wrote an exposé, explaining why the Michigan relics were forgeries. Soper remained involved with the fraudulent relic scheme until his death.

== Personal life ==
Soper had two children. On December 8, 1915, his wife Mary A. Howell died.

== Later life and death ==
By 1914, Soper moved to Chattanooga, Tennessee. In January 1923, Soper died in Chattanooga. He was interred at Forest Hills cemetery.
