= John G. Berry =

American politician

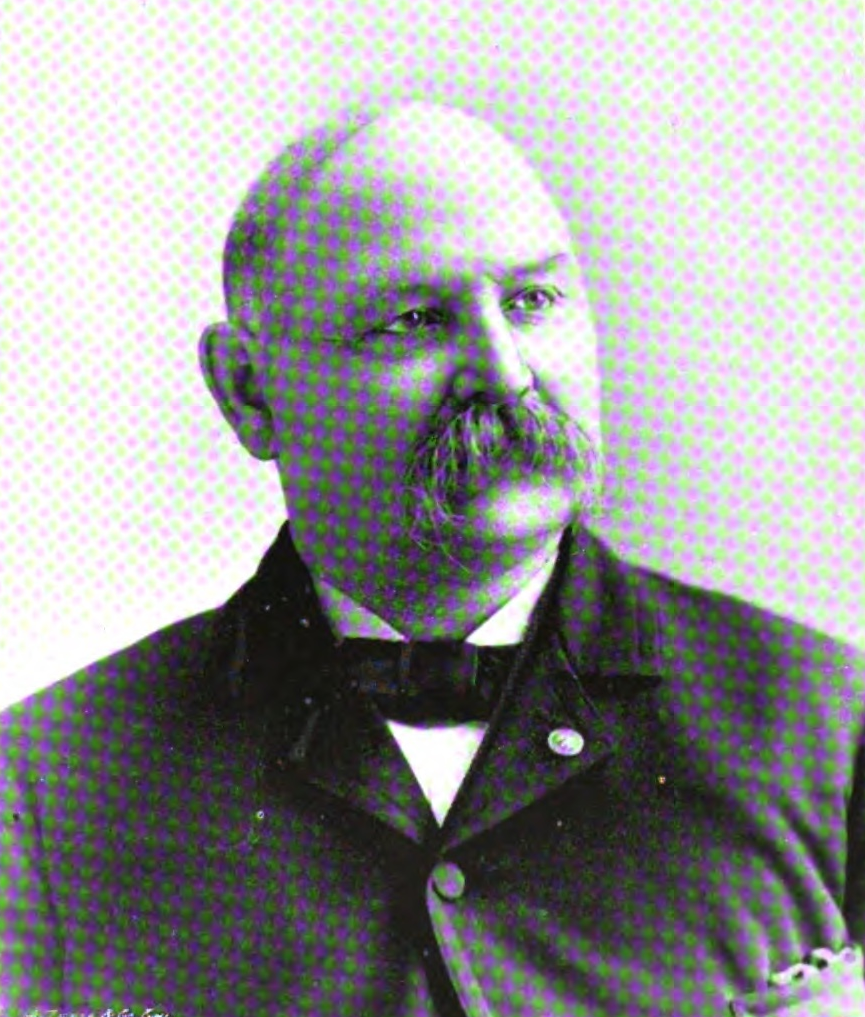

Commissioner of the State Land Office
- In office 1893 – March 20, 1894
- Governor: John T. Rich
- Preceded by: George T. Shaffer
- Succeeded by: William A. French

Member of the Michigan Senate from the 27th district
- In office 1889–1890
- Preceded by: Ansel W. Westgate
- Succeeded by: James E. Holcomb

Personal details
- Born: December 13, 1838 New York, New York, U.S.
- Died: August 1, 1923 (aged 84) Vanderbilt, Michigan, U.S.
- Party: Republican

John Gayfer Berry (December 13, 1838 – August 1, 1923) was an American politician. He was elected commissioner of the Michigan state land office in 1892. He served from 1893 to March 20, 1894, when he was removed from office by Governor John T. Rich for gross neglect of duty.

== Biography ==
John G. Berry was born to William and Anna Berry in New York City on December 13, 1838. He moved to the Upper Peninsula of Michigan at age sixteen. There, he engaged in farming and mining.

During the Civil War, Berry enlisted on August 3, 1861, to the 16th Michigan Infantry Regiment for three years. His right arm was injured at the Battle of Fredericksburg. He enlisted again at the end of the three years. He was honorably discharged at the end of the war. He had achieved the rank of captain.

After the war, he worked as a clerk for a hardware store in Detroit. He'd then work in Berryville in Otsego County, before running a general store in Vanderbilt. He was a commander in the Grand Army of the Republic and served as president of the Soldiers and Sailors' Association of Northern Michigan.

Berry married Mary L. Elder in the 1860s. The couple had 4 children.

In 1888, Berry was elected to the Michigan Senate, where he represented the 27th district as a Republican from 1889 to 1890.

=== Land commissioner ===
Berry was nominated by acclamation for commissioner of the state land office at the 1890 Republican State Convention, but was defeated by Democratic nominee George T. Shaffer in the general election. Berry was nominated, again by acclamation, for the land commissioner once more at the state convention in July 1892. In the November 1892 general election, Berry defeated the incumbent Shaffer.

As land commissioner, Berry was an ex officio member of the state board of canvassers, along with the state treasurer and secretary of state. In April 1893, a state constitutional amendment was voted on by the people, proposing an increase in salary for various state officials. While initial results showed the amendment succeeded by a slim majority, it was discovered in January 1894 that there had been an error in canvassing the results. In reality, the amendment had failed to pass. On February 19, Governor John T. Rich ordered the removal of Land Commissioner Berry, Secretary of State John W. Jochim, and State Treasurer Joseph F. Hambitzer from office, on grounds of gross neglect of duty. Though Rich ordered the removal, he did not appoint replacements, as he awaited a state Supreme Court ruling in regard to the removal.

In February 1894, Berry and nine other men were indicted by grand jury. Berry had been indicted for felonious false record keeping, conspiracy, and willful neglect of duty. On March 20, the Michigan Supreme Court ruled in favor of Governor Rich, affirming that he had the authority to remove Berry, Jochim, and Hambitzer from office. The same day, Governor Rich removed the officials and appointed their replacements. Berry was replaced as land commissioner by William A. French.

In December 1896, the prosecution dropped the cases against Berry and several others involved in the scandal.

=== Death ===
Berry died on August 1, 1923, in Vanderbilt. He was interred at Vanderbilt Cemetery on August 5.
