= John W. Jochim =

American politician

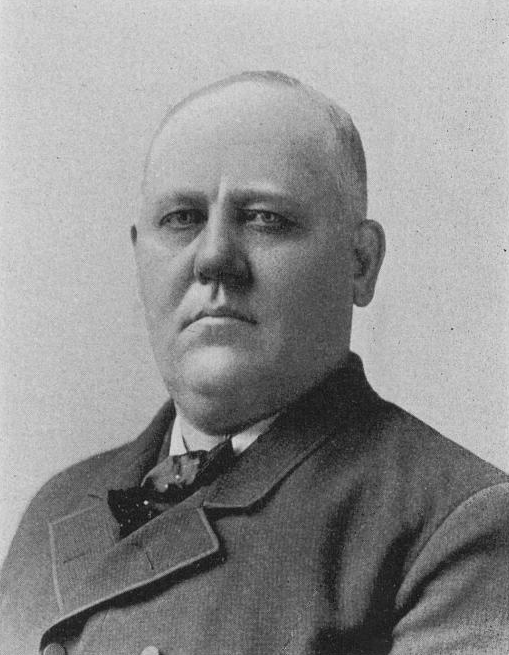

Michigan Secretary of State
- In office 1893 – March 20, 1894
- Governor: John T. Rich
- Preceded by: Robert R. Blacker
- Succeeded by: Washington Gardner

Personal details
- Born: October 12, 1845 Motala, Sweden
- Died: January 17, 1905 (aged 59) Ishpeming, Michigan, U.S.
- Party: Republican
- Spouse: Gustafva Wetterlund (m. 1873)

John Walfrid Jochim (October 12, 1845 – January 17, 1905) was a Swedish-born American politician and merchant. He was elected Michigan Secretary of State in 1892. He served from 1893 to March 20, 1894, when he was removed from office by Governor John T. Rich for gross neglect of duty.

== Biography ==
John W. Jochim was born on October 12, 1845, in Motala, Sweden. He was educated in Swedish public schools. In 1869 he emigrated to the United States. He arrived in Ishpeming, Michigan, on August 16 the same year. In 1870, he began working for a hardware store. In 1874, he established his own hardware store. He was also for some time a partner in the general merchant firm Taleen, Jochim & Co.

On May 6, 1873, Jochim married Gustafva Wetterlund, a Swedish woman, in Ishpeming. The couple had three children which died young, two daughters and one son. They had one son who survived into adulthood, Howard, and one adopted daughter.

In 1877, Jochim was involved in a legal dispute surrounding an election. He had run for the position of Ishpeming city treasurer against Cornelius Kennedy. Kennedy was declared the winner. In the election, "John W. Jochim" and "John Jochim" were counted as separate candidates. Had they been considered the same candidate, Jochim would have won by 6 votes. His legal counsel argued that Jochim was the only "Jochim" in Ishpeming, therefore all of the Jochim votes should be counted together. His case failed in circuit court, be he appealed to the Michigan Supreme Court. In the higher court, his case was successful, and he was elected Ispheming city treasurer. He would also served in the Ishpeming local government as an alderman and as a member of the school board.

=== Secretary of state ===
Jochim was unanimously nominated by acclamation for the office of Michigan Secretary of State at the Republican State Convention in July 1892. In the November 1892 general election, Jochim defeated the Democratic nominee Charles F. Marskey.

As secretary of state, Jochim was an ex officio member of the state board of canvassers, along with the state treasurer and commissioner of the state land office. In April 1893, a state constitutional amendment was voted on by the people, proposing an increase in salary for various state officials. While initial results showed the amendment succeeded by a slim majority, it was discovered in January 1894 that there had been an error in canvassing the results. In reality, the amendment had failed to pass. On February 19, Governor John T. Rich ordered the removal of Secretary of State Jochim, Land Commissioner John G. Berry, and State Treasurer Joseph F. Hambitzer from office, on grounds of gross neglect of duty. Though Rich ordered the removal, he did not appoint replacements, as he awaited a state Supreme Court ruling in regard to the removal.

In February 1894, Jochim and nine other men were indicted by grand jury. Jochim had been indicted for felonious false record keeping, conspiracy, and willful neglect of duty. On March 20, the Michigan Supreme Court ruled in favor of Governor Rich, affirming that he had the authority to remove Jochim, Berry, and Hambitzer from office. The same day, Governor Rich removed the officials and appointed their replacements. Jochim was replaced as secretary of state by Washington Gardner, who would later go on to be elected to the United States House of Representatives.

Jochim's trial over the charge of false public record keeping began on April 9, 1894. Before the trial, Jochim's deputy secretary of state August W. Lindholm had embezzled funds and fled from Michigan. The prosecution against Jochim attempted to get a continuance on the trial due to Lindholm's absence, but it was not granted. The trial ended on April 14, with a hung jury. In December 1896, the prosecution dropped the cases against Jochim and several others involved in the scandal.

=== Later life and death ===
Jochim served as president of the Marquette Hardware Company.

Jochim died on January 17, 1905, in an Ishpeming hospital, from diabetes.
