= Robert R. Blacker =

American politician

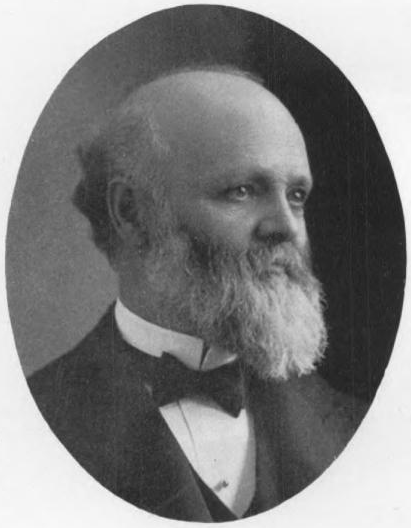

Michigan Secretary of State
- In office December 24, 1891 – 1892
- Governor: Edwin B. Winans
- Preceded by: Daniel E. Soper
- Succeeded by: John W. Jochim

Member of the Michigan House of Representatives from the Manistee County district
- In office 1883–1886
- Preceded by: Giles M. Wing
- Succeeded by: William G. Baumgardner

Personal details
- Born: October 31, 1845 Brantford, Province of Canada
- Died: September 1931 (aged 85) Santa Monica, California, U.S.
- Party: Democratic

Robert Roe Blacker (October 31, 1845 – September 1931) was a Canadian-born American politician and lumber baron.

== Early life ==
Robert R. Blacker was born on October 31, 1845, in Brantford, Ontario in Canada. He moved to Buchanan, Michigan in Berrien County at age 19, in 1864. He lived there until 1866, when he moved to Manistee. There, he began working at lumber mills. Blacker became a naturalized citizen in July 1874.

== Career ==
In 1875, Blacker formed a business partnership with R. G. Peters known as R. R. Blacker & Co., for the operation of a shingle mill. In 1879, he formed a partnership with E. T. Davies and Patrick Noud, known as Davies, Blacker & Co. The firm built and operated a saw mill and shingle plant. The firm lasted until 1887, when it was merged into the State Lumber Company, which Blacker served as the secretary and treasurer of. Blacker was involved with a number of other enterprises, including the Manistee Water Company, the Eureka Lumber Company, and the Manistee Filer City and Eastlake Electric Railway Company. Blacker was one of the organizers of the First National Bank of Manistee. Blacker was involved in a number of philanthropic projects in Manistee. By 1900, Blacker was a millionaire lumberman and salt manufacturer.

Blacker was a Democrat. In the spring 1880 election, Blacker was elected alderman for the ninth ward of Manistee. He served six terms, and served as the chairman of the finance committee, as well as president pro tempore of the council. In 1882, Blacker was elected to the Michigan House of Representatives to represent the Manistee County district. In 1884, he was re-elected. In 1888, Blacker was elected Manistee mayor, and served for four consecutive terms.

On December 19, 1891, Michigan Secretary of State Daniel E. Soper resigned amid scandal. On December 24, Blacker was appointed by Governor Edwin B. Winans to serve Soper's expired term. During Blacker's term, he was named in the United States Supreme Court case McPherson v. Blacker, decided on October 17, 1892. In the case, Michigan presidential elector William McPherson, along with other electors, filed suit against the state of Michigan in regard to their appointment method for electors. The case was the first Supreme Court case to consider whether certain methods of states' appointments of their electors were constitutional.

In 1884, Blacker served as a delegate to the Democratic National Convention. In 1892, he served as an alternate delegate to the convention. In 1896, Blacker, in the election for delegate to the Democratic National Convention from the third district, served as the candidate in favor of the gold standard, as opposed to the silver standard. Blacker was elected by a viva voce vote over William F. Knight, under a suspension of the rules.

== Personal life ==
Blacker married Harriet L. Williams around 1873. She died in a carriage accident on June 11, 1896. On February 22, 1900, Blacker married Nellie C. Canfield. Blacker was a member of the Congregational Church. Blacker was a Freemason.

== Later life and death ==
In December 1900, Blacker, along with Charles J. Canfield, moved from Manistee to Chicago, citing high taxes in Michigan as the reason. He moved to Pasadena, California after his retirement in 1907. He died at his Santa Monica home in September 1931. His funeral was held in Pasadena on September 19. His body was sent to Brantford, Ontario for burial.

The Manistee County Blacker Airport is named for Robert R. Blacker.

== See also ==
- Robert R. Blacker House
