= Michigan State Land Office =

Former government department

Agency overview
- Formed: 1843
- Dissolved: 1914
- Superseding agency: Public Domain Commission
- Jurisdiction: State of Michigan
- Headquarters: Marshall, Michigan (1843 – 1849); Lansing, Michigan (1849 – 1914)

The Michigan State Land Office was a department of the state government of Michigan. It was founded in 1843 and abolished in 1914.

== History ==
The state land office was established in 1843. The headquarters of the department were located in Marshall at first, but they were moved to Lansing in 1849. The head of the department of was the commissioner of the state land office. Initially, the land commissioner was a position appointed by the governor with the consent of the state Senate. Under the 1850 Michigan Constitution, the land commissioner was turned into an elected position. The 1908 state constitution allowed for the department to be abolished.

In 1913, Governor Woodbridge N. Ferris signed a bill to abolish the state land office, effective December 31, 1914. The land commissioner's seat on various boards was transferred to the superintendent of public instruction. The functions of the state land office were transferred to the public domain commission. A 1921 act abolished the public domain commission and transferred its functions to the conservation department.

== Function ==
The Michigan Official Directory and Legislative Manual for the years 1913 to 1914 described the functions of the commissioner of the state land office as such:

He has the general charge and management of all the lands belonging to the state, or in which the state has any interest, or which are held by the state in trust for any purpose; the selling, leasing, and general disposition of all the lands of the state; the custody of the original field notes and plats of surveys of the state. He receives the principal and interest on all lands sold by the state, and collects delinquent taxes on part-paid lands. On his certificate lands sold by the state are patented by the governor. He has the general charge of prosecuting trespasses on state lands and the appointment of trespass agents. He issues licenses to homestead settlers and takes steps to restore to market forfeited homesteads. He has the custody of all books and papers relating to public lands, and keeps the records of sale and disposition of all public lands; sends lists of lands sold, to county treasurers for the purpose of assessment for taxation. He is a member of the board of state auditors, state board of equalization, board of state canvassers, public domain commission, state board of control and board of control for reclamation of state swamp lands.

== List of commissioners of the state land office ==
Image	Name	Term	Party / Appointer	Notes	Ref.
	Digby V. Bell	1843–1846	John S. Barry		
	Abiel Silver	1846–1850	Alpheus Felch		
	Porter Kibbee	1850–1854	John S. Barry (Note: Initially appointed by governor in 1850, and then elected to office later in 1850.)		
	Porter Kibbee	1850–1854	Democratic		
	Seymour B. Treadwell	1855–1858	Republican		
	James W. Sanborn	1859–1860	Republican		
	Samuel S. Lacey	1861–1864	Republican		
	Cyrus Hewitt	1865–1866	Republican		
	Benjamin D. Pritchard	1867–1870	Republican		
	Charles A. Edmonds	1871–1872	Republican		
	Leverett A. Clapp	1873–1876	Republican		
	Benjamin F. Partridge	1877–1878	Republican		
	James M. Neasmith	1879–1882	Republican		
	Minor Newell	1883–1886	Republican		
	Roscoe D. Dix	1887–1890	Republican		
	George T. Shaffer	1891–1892	Democratic		
	John G. Berry	1893–1894	Republican	Removed (Note: Removed from office by the governor.)	
	William A. French	1894–1900	John T. Rich (Note: Initially appointed by governor to fill vacancy, and then elected in the following general election.)		
	William A. French	1894–1900	Republican		
	Edwin A. Wildey	1901–1904	Republican		
	William H. Rose	1905–1908	Republican		
	Huntley Russell	1909–1912	Republican		
	Augustus C. Carton	1913–1914	Republican		
