= Washington Gardner =

American soldier and politician (1845–1928)

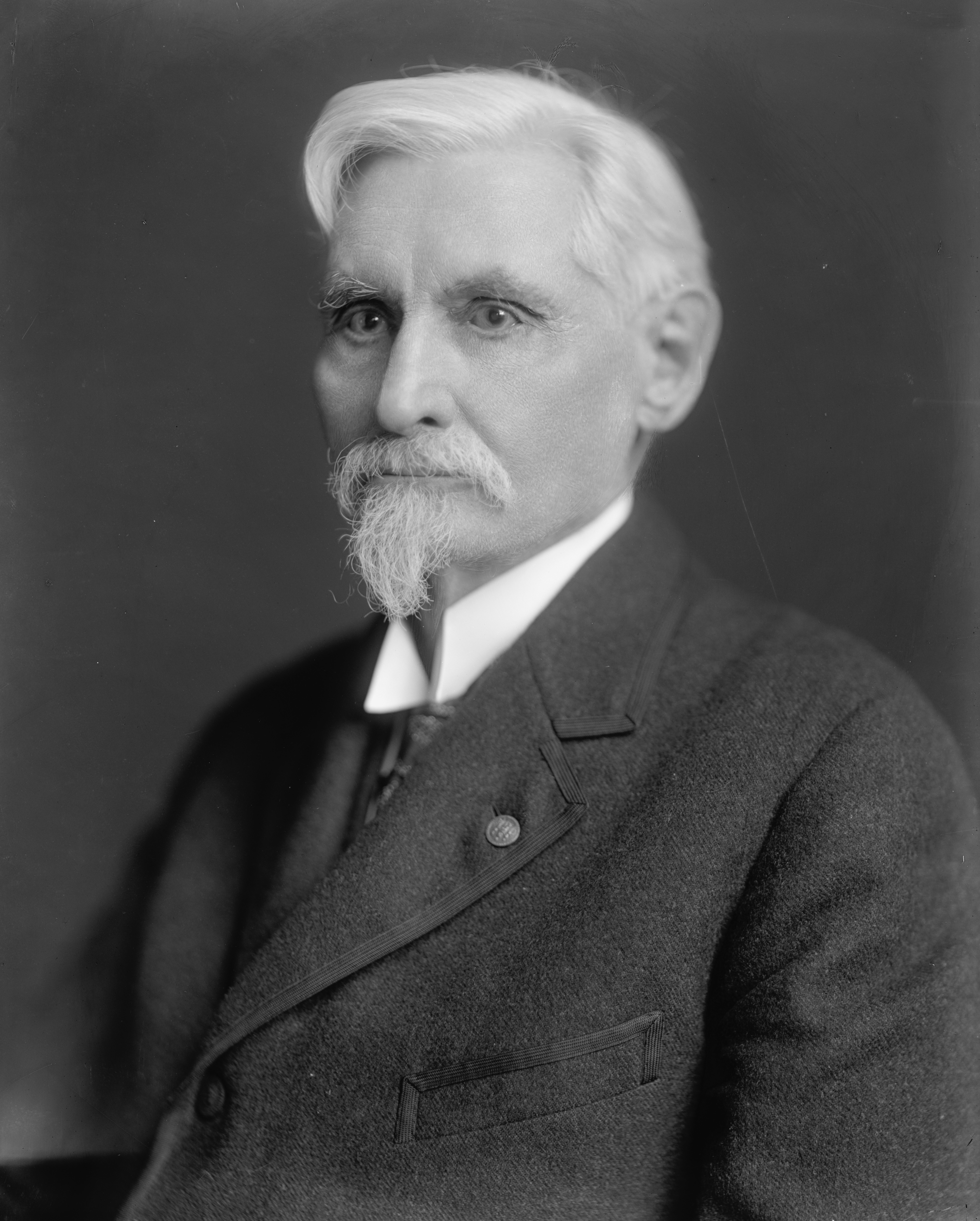
- Gardner, 1905–1928

Member of the U.S. House of Representatives from Michigan's 3rd district
- In office March 4, 1899 – March 3, 1911
- Preceded by: Albert M. Todd
- Succeeded by: John M. C. Smith

22nd Michigan Secretary of State
- In office 1894–1899
- Governor: John T. Rich
- Preceded by: John W. Jochim
- Succeeded by: Justus Smith Stearns

Personal details
- Born: February 16, 1845 Morrow County, Ohio, U.S.
- Died: March 31, 1928 (aged 83) Albion, Michigan, U.S.
- Party: Republican
- Education: Hillsdale College; Ohio Wesleyan University; Boston University; Albany Law School

Military service
- Branch/service: Union Army
- Years of service: 1861–1865
- Unit: 65th Ohio Infantry Regiment

Washington Gardner (February 16, 1845 – March 31, 1928) was a lawyer, minister, politician and Civil War veteran from the U.S. state of Michigan.

== Biography ==
Gardner was born in Morrow County, Ohio. He entered the Union Army and served in Company D, Sixty-Fifth Regiment, Ohio Volunteer Infantry, from October 1861 to December 1865. He was severely wounded in action at the Battle of Resaca in Resaca, Georgia.

After the war, he attended school at Berea, Ohio, then at Hillsdale College, Hillsdale, Michigan, and graduated from the Ohio Wesleyan University, Delaware, Ohio, in 1870. He studied in the school of theology at Boston University, in 1870 and 1871 and graduated from the Albany Law School in 1876. He was admitted to the bar and "practiced law one year in Grand Rapids, Mich., and then entered the ministry of the Methodist Episcopal Church, in which he served twelve years." He was commander of the Department of Michigan, Grand Army of the Republic, in 1888. He was professor in Albion College, 1889–1894.

On March 20, 1894, Gardner was appointed Michigan Secretary of State by Governor John T. Rich to fill the vacancy caused by the removal of John W. Jochim. He was then twice elected to the position in 1894 and 1896, serving until 1899. In 1898, he defeated incumbent Democrat Albert M. Todd to be elected as a Republican from Michigan's 3rd congressional district to the 56th United States Congress. He was subsequently re-elected to the five succeeding Congresses, serving from March 4, 1899, to March 3, 1911. He served as chairman of the Committee on Expenditures in the Department of Commerce and Labor in the 61st Congress. He was an unsuccessful candidate for reelection in 1910 to the 62nd Congress.

He was commander in chief of the Grand Army of the Republic in 1913 and 1914. He was an unsuccessful candidate in the primary election for Governor of Michigan. He served as Commissioner of Pensions from March 22, 1921, to March 4, 1925. He retired from public life and died in Albion, Michigan, in 1928. He was interred in Riverside Cemetery, in Albion.

== Legacy ==
Washington Gardner Middle School (formerly Washington Gardner High School) in Albion, Michigan, is named in his honor.

== Bibliography ==
- History of Calhoun County, Michigan. Vol. 1 and Vol. 2 Washington Gardner, ed. Chicago, New York: The Lewis publishing company, 1913.

Political offices
Preceded by John W. Jochim	Michigan Secretary of State; 1896–1899	Succeeded by Justus S. Stearns
U.S. House of Representatives
Preceded by Albert M. Todd	United States Representative for the 3rd congressional district of Michigan; 1899–1911	Succeeded by John M. C. Smith
