= Alfred Milnes =

American soldier and politician

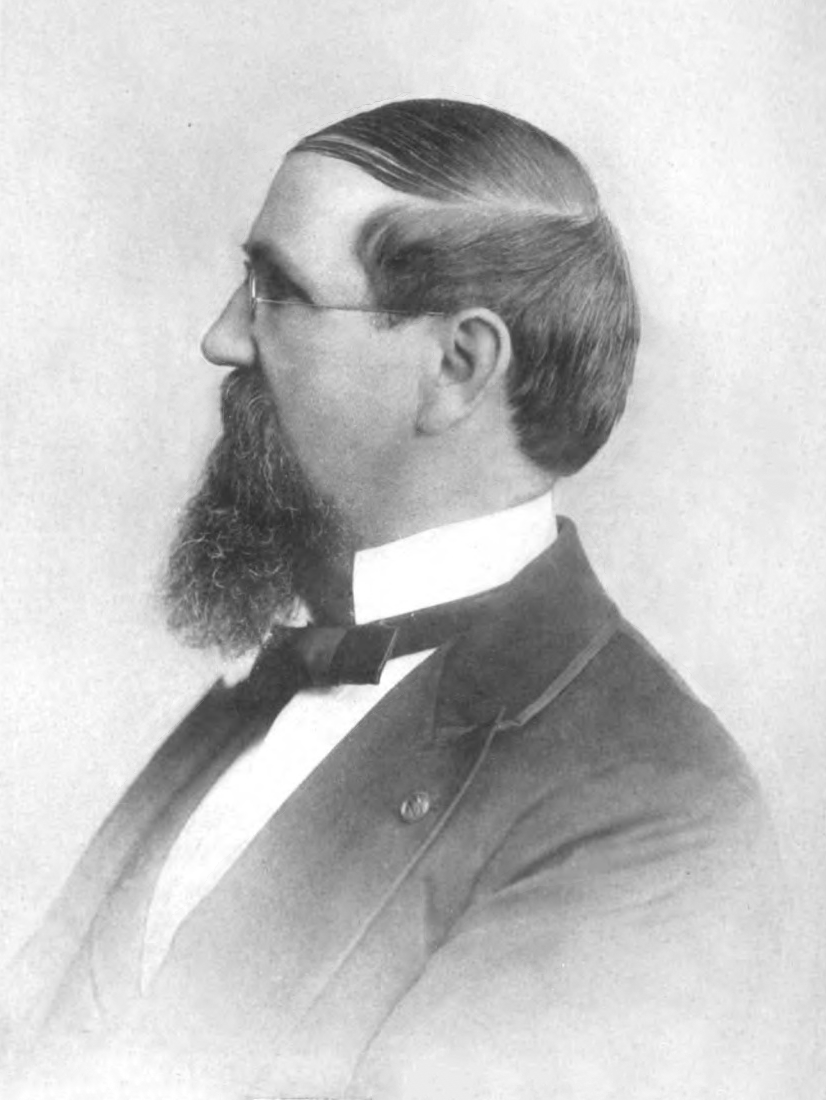
- Livingstone's History of the Republican Party, c. 1900

Member of the U.S. House of Representatives from Michigan's 3rd district
- In office December 2, 1895 – March 3, 1897
- Preceded by: Julius C. Burrows
- Succeeded by: Albert M. Todd

28th Lieutenant Governor of Michigan
- In office 1895 – June 1, 1895
- Governor: John T. Rich
- Preceded by: J. Wight Giddings
- Succeeded by: Joseph R. McLaughlin

Personal details
- Born: May 28, 1844 Bradford, Yorkshire, England
- Died: January 15, 1916 (aged 71) Coldwater, Michigan, U.S.
- Party: Republican
- Spouse: Lucina E. Hull
- Children: 3

Alfred Milnes (May 28, 1844 – January 15, 1916) was a politician from the U.S. state of Michigan.

== Early life ==
Milnes was born in Bradford, Yorkshire, England. His parents, Henry and Mary Ann (née Amyss) Milnes joined the LDS Church and left England with their family in 1854. After a sixty-day voyage from Liverpool, they arrived in New Orleans, from which they proceeded by boat to St. Louis and then to Kansas City. There, Henry bought a wagon and proceeded overland to Salt Lake City, via Fort Kearny, Fort Laramie, and Fort Bridger. After sixteen weeks, they reached their destination on September 25, 1854. Two years later, Mary Ann died and Henry moved with the family to Springville, Utah, and remained there until May 1859. Henry had become disenchanted with the Mormons and sold his property at a great loss in order to leave. They stayed in Newton, Iowa, for the winter of 1859–1860, and in 1861 arrived in Coldwater, Michigan, after traveling the entire distance by oxen-drawn wagon. He opened a small store and became a successful merchant.

Alfred Milnes was age seventeen upon arriving in Coldwater. He had attended the common schools in Salt Lake City and Newton. In Coldwater, he worked as he was able to during the summer and attended school in the winter.

With the outbreak of the Civil War, Milnes enlisted as a private in Company C, Seventeenth Regiment, Michigan Volunteer Infantry, June 30, 1862. The forces mustered at Detroit, and left the state on August 27, 1862, going straight to Washington, D.C. On September 14, he saw action in the Battle of South Mountain in Maryland. Three days later, the regiment was in the Battle of Antietam, where they lost half their men. Their next engagement was the Battle of Fredericksburg, after which they were joined with the 9th Army Corps under the overall command of General Ambrose Burnside, and engaged in the pursuit of Confederate General John Hunt Morgan to put an end to Morgan's Raid. After this, his regiment was positioned to serve as rearguard against attack by Confederate General Joseph E. Johnston at the Siege of Vicksburg. The regiment then proceeded to Jackson, Mississippi. The regiment then went to Kentucky and into east Tennessee, where it saw action in the Battle of Campbell's Station and the Siege of Knoxville. They then moved to Annapolis, Maryland, where they were attached to the Army of the Potomac. The 17th regiment saw heavy losses in the Battle of the Wilderness, with only 35 of the original 225 remaining. The regiment was discontinued as a military unit and the survivors were taken to the headquarters of General Orlando B. Willcox, where they served guard duty until the end of the war.

After the war, Milnes was 21 years old when he returned to Coldwater. He worked as a clerk in his father's business until 1871, when he formed a mercantile partnership called "Mines & Vanderhoof". The partnership prospered for ten years, after which Milnes sold hist interest and started his own business. On January 6, 1868, Milnes married Lucina E. Hull, the younger child of Cyrus and Eunice (Allen) Hull, who were owned a farm in Quincy. Alfred and Lucina had three children: Alfred Cyrus, Maude L., and Mabel F.

== Politics ==
Milnes became a member of the board of aldermen of Coldwater in 1876 and 1877. He was elected mayor of Coldwater in 1885 and 1886 was a member of the Michigan Senate, where he represented the 7th district, from 1888 to 1892. He was elected the 28th lieutenant governor of Michigan in 1894 and served under Governor John T. Rich until his resignation June 1, 1895.

Milnes was chosen from a special election in April 1895 as a Republican from Michigan's 3rd congressional district to the 54th Congress to fill the vacancy caused by the resignation of Julius C. Burrows. Milnes served from December 2, 1895, to March 3, 1897. He was an unsuccessful candidate for re-election in 1896 to the Fifty-Fifth Congress and was appointed postmaster of Coldwater in 1898 and served until 1902. He was also a delegate to the Michigan constitutional convention of 1907 and 1908.

== After the political career ==
Alfred Milnes engaged in the real estate and insurance business in Coldwater until his death. He was interred there in Oak Grove Cemetery.

Political offices
Preceded by J. Wight Giddings	Lieutenant Governor of Michigan; 1895	Succeeded by Joseph R. McLaughlin
U.S. House of Representatives
Preceded by Julius C. Burrows	Member of the U.S. House of Representatives from Michigan's 3rd congressional district December 2, 1895 – March 3, 1897	Succeeded by Albert M. Todd
