= Joseph R. McLaughlin (Michigan politician) =

American politician

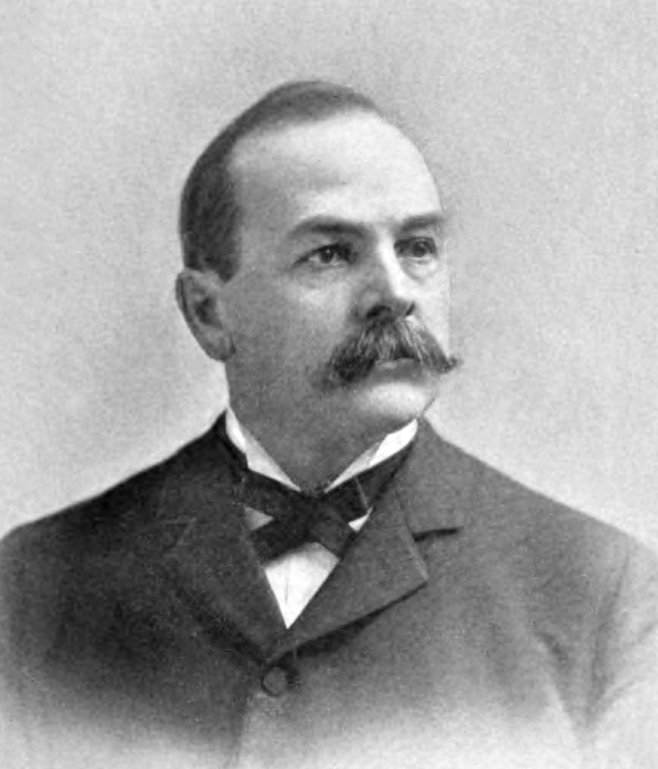
Acting Michigan Lieutenant Governor Joseph R. McLaughlin

Joseph R. McLaughlin (June 5, 1851 – July 3, 1932) was an entrepreneur and politician from the U.S. state of Michigan, serving as the 29th lieutenant governor of Michigan from 1895 to 1897.

McLaughlin was a graduate of the University of Michigan. He got his BA his 1877 and his law degree in 1879.

Early in 1886 McLaughlin thought he could see a future for electricity and undertook the organization of the Edison Company in Detroit. This company was organized in just six weeks from the time he undertook it. At that time, it was the second largest Edison illuminating company in the United States, only the one at the Pearl Street Station, New York City, was larger. The Detroit Edison company started with a capital of $250,000. Organizing this company McLaughlin was its Secretary and Manager during the construction of the plant and the first two years of its operation placing it upon a good paying basis. The Edison General Company recognized his ability as an organizer and made him their general agent for Ohio.

Prior to serving as lieutenant governor, McLaughlin was also a successful real estate developer in and around Detroit, MI. Arden Park-East Boston was originally called the McLaughlin's and Owens Subdivision, the development was platted on June 1, 1892, by McLaughlin and Edmund J. Owen.

McLaughlin was president pro tempore of the Michigan Senate in 1895 when Lieutenant Governor Alfred Milnes was chosen in a special election to replace Julius C. Burrows in the U.S. House. McLaughlin, at the resignation of Milnes, performed duties as the lieutenant governor under Governor John T. Rich from June 1, 1895, to January 1, 1897.

McLaughlin relocated to Seattle, WA in 1906. Joseph R. McLaughlin, Paul C. Murphy, and Frank F. Mead pressed ahead with development [of "Laurelhurst"]. Realtors affixed enticing names to their peninsula developments. Besides "Laurelhurst," there was "Laurelhurst Heights," "The Palisades," "McLaughlin's Lawn Acres," and "Scottish Heights."

Political offices
Preceded by Alfred Milnes	Lieutenant Governor of Michigan; 1895–1897	Succeeded by Thomas B. Dunstan
