= Roscoe D. Dix =

American politician

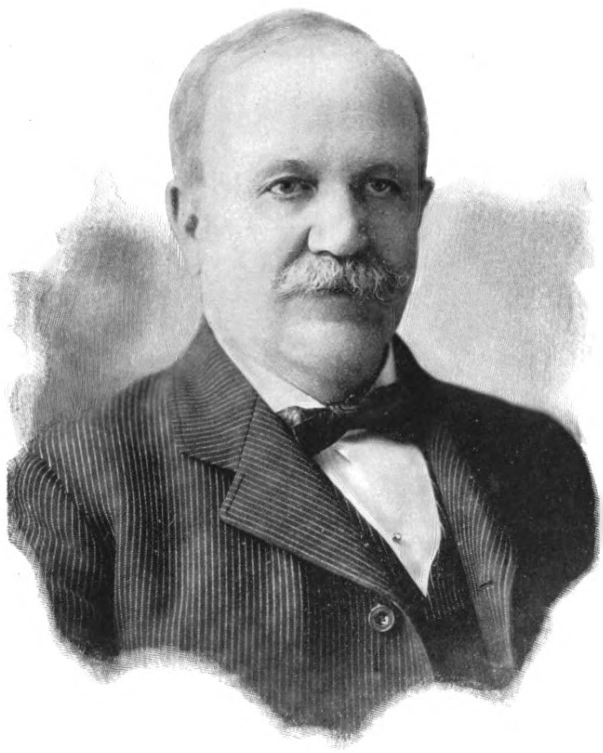

Michigan Auditor General
- In office 1897–1900
- Governor: Hazen S. Pingree
- Preceded by: Stanley W. Turner
- Succeeded by: Perry F. Powers

Commissioner of the State Land Office
- In office 1887–1890
- Governor: Cyrus G. Luce
- Preceded by: Minor Newell
- Succeeded by: George T. Shaffer

Personal details
- Born: June 11, 1839 Jefferson County, New York, US
- Died: September 5, 1912 (aged 73) Berrien Springs, Michigan, US
- Party: Republican
- Spouse: Virginia M. Kephart

Military service
- Allegiance: United States (Union Army)
- Battles/wars: American Civil War

Roscoe Dexter Dix (June 11, 1839 – September 5, 1912) was a Michigan politician who served as Michigan Auditor General from 1897 to 1900.

== Early life ==
Dix was born in Jefferson County, New York on June 11, 1839, to parents Dexter Ozias and Mary Eliza Dix. Dix is distantly related to Robert Treat.

== Career ==
Dix fought with the Union Army in the American Civil War. Dix was injured in a battle in Knoxville, Tennessee, in which he was permanently disabled.

At some point in his life, Dix had various jobs, including that of a barber, a real estate agent, and a banker. From 1887 to 1890, Dix served as Michigan land commissioner. Dix served as the Michigan Auditor General from 1897 to 1900.

== Personal life ==
On January 2, 1867, Dix married Virginia M. Kephart. Together, they had at least three children. Dix was a member of the Grand Army of the Republic.

Dix died on September 5, 1912, in Berrien Springs, Michigan. He was interred at Rose Hill Cemetery in Berrien Springs.
