= George A. Steel (Michigan politician) =

Michigan politician

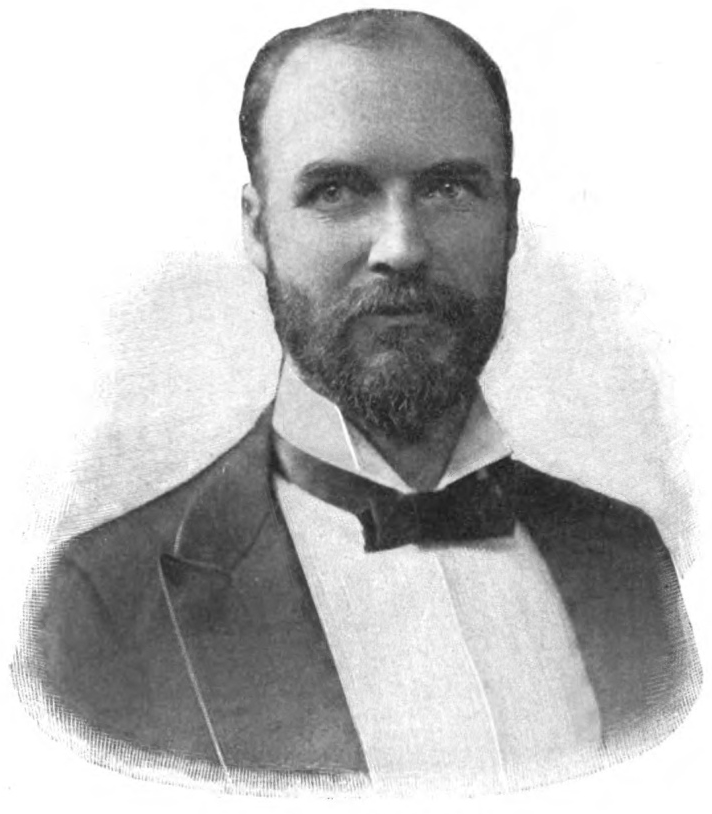

Treasurer of Michigan
- In office 1897–1900
- Preceded by: James M. Wilkinson
- Succeeded by: Daniel McCoy

Member of the Michigan Senate from the 19th district
- In office January 4, 1893 – December 31, 1894
- Preceded by: William Toan
- Succeeded by: Chester W. Martin

Personal details
- Born: June 19, 1862 St. Johns, Michigan
- Party: Republican

George A. Steel (born June 19, 1862) was a Michigan politician.

== Early life and education ==
Steel was born on June 19, 1862, in St. Johns, Michigan. There, Steel received a public school education.

== Career ==
In July 1878, Steel went to Sauk Rapids, Minnesota, where he took the position of bookkeeper and paymaster for the bridge construction firm James McIntire & Company. Steel then moved to St. Paul, Minnesota, where he worked in the same position for the same firm. In 1879, Steel worked as a paymaster in Nevada during the construction of the Nevada Central Railroad. In 1880, Steel became general paymaster and purchasing agent for the Oregon Construction Company, where he aided in the construction of four hundred miles of railroad in the states of Oregon, Washington, and Idaho. Later, the duties were combined, and Steel had full control of the company's finances.

In 1885, Steel returned to Michigan. He became vice president of the St. Johns National Bank that same year. From 1892 to 1893, Steel served as a member of the Michigan Republican State Central Committee. On November 8, 1892, Steel was elected to the Michigan Senate where he represented the 19th district from January 4, 1893, to December 31, 1894. In 1893, Steel organized the Ithaca Savings Bank, to which he became president. In January 1895, Steel formed a firm with F. A. Smith named Steel, Smith, and Company which bought and sold municipal bonds and commercial paper. Steel served two terms as Michigan State Treasurer from 1897 to 1900.

== Personal life ==
On January 28, 1885, Steel married Cora Stout. Together, they had two children.

Political offices
Preceded by James M. Wilkinson	State Treasurer of Michigan; 1897-1900	Succeeded by Daniel McCoy
