= Daniel McCoy (politician) =

American politician

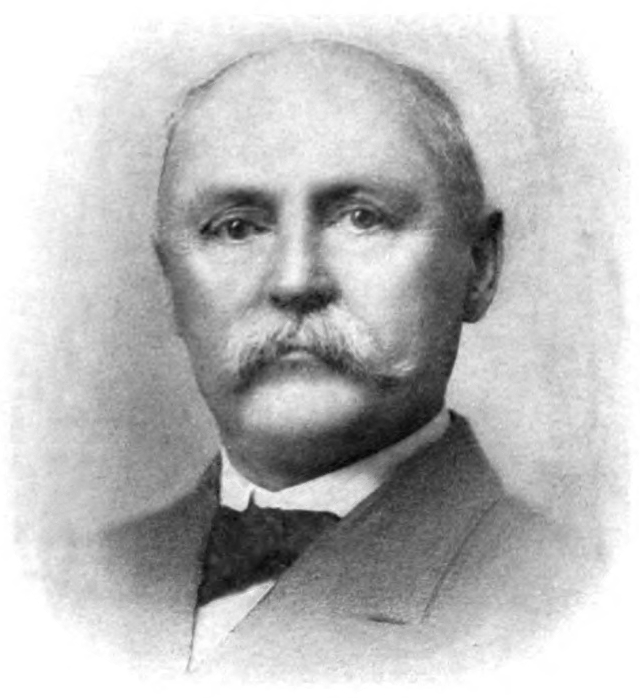

Treasurer of Michigan
- In office 1901–1904
- Preceded by: George A. Steel
- Succeeded by: Frank P. Glazier

Personal details
- Born: July 17, 1845 Philadelphia, Pennsylvania, US
- Died: November 6, 1908 (aged 63) Grand Rapids, Michigan, US
- Party: Republican

Daniel McCoy (July 17, 1845 – November 6, 1908) was a Michigan politician.

== Early life and education ==
Daniel McCoy was born on July 17, 1845, in Philadelphia, Pennsylvania, to parents John and Mary Ann McCoy. There, he received a public school education. In 1867, McCoy moved to Romeo, Michigan.

== Career ==
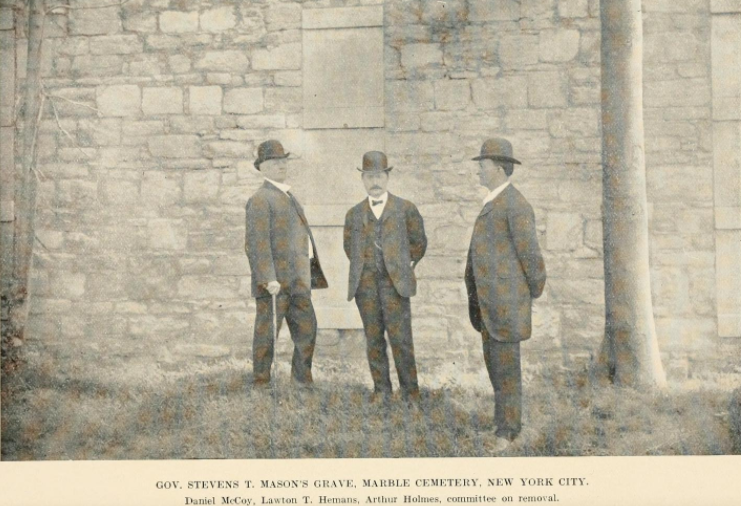

Once in Michigan, McCoy began a grain business which furnished supplies to the lumbering regions of Michigan. In 1872, McCoy sold out this business and took to lumbering on the south branch of the Manistee River. In 1873, McCoy settled in the village of Clam Lake, which is now the city of Cadillac, where he continued his lumbering business for ten years. While there, McCoy ended up holding the positions of village president of Clam Lake, and later mayor of Cadillac. In 1883, McCoy moved to Grand Rapids, Michigan. There, in 1886, he organized the Edison Light Company. In 1892, he organized the State Bank of Michigan. McCoy served as Michigan State Treasurer from 1901 to 1904. In 1905, McCoy was appointed a member of the Pioneer Society of the State of Michigan. That same year, McCoy was appointed by Michigan Governor Fred M. Warner, along with Lawton T. Hemans and Arthur Holmes, to be the commissioners to relocate the remains of the first governor of Michigan, Stevens T. Mason, from New York Marble Cemetery in New York City to Capitol Park in Detroit so that they may be reinterned there. Governor Mason's remains arrived in Detroit on June 4, 1905.

== Personal life ==
October 19, 1869, McCoy married Abigail Lyon Ayers (February 17, 1848-1929) . Together, they had three children: Helen Francis (1871-1963), Katherine (1879-1961), and Gerald (1881-1870).

Find a Grave burial details

== Death ==
McCoy died on November 6, 1908, in Grand Rapids. There, he was interred in Oakhill Cemetery.

Political offices
| Preceded by George A. Steel | State Treasurer of Michigan; 1901-1904 | Succeeded by Frank P. Glazier |
