= John T. Rich =

American politician (1841–1926)

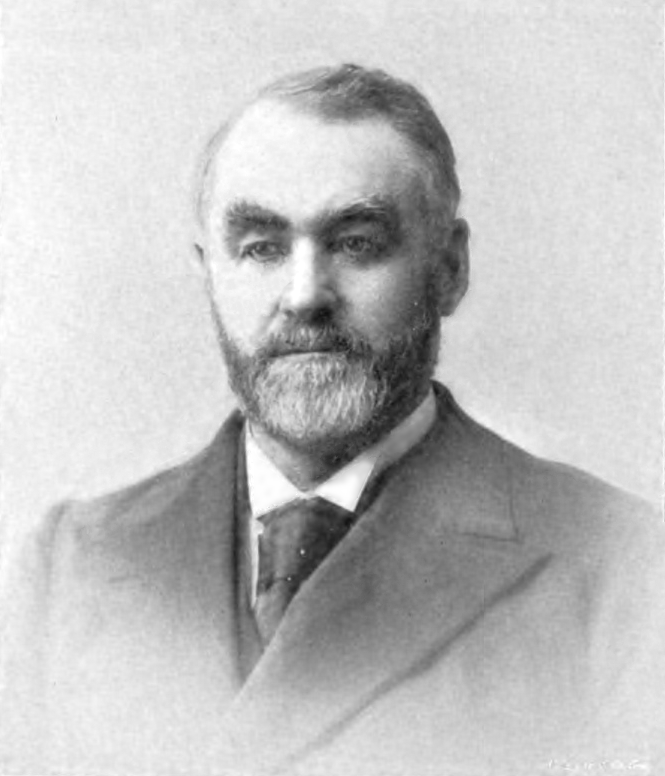

23rd Governor of Michigan
- In office January 1, 1893 – January 1, 1897
- Lieutenant: J. Wight Giddings; Alfred Milnes; Joseph R. McLaughlin
- Preceded by: Edwin B. Winans
- Succeeded by: Hazen S. Pingree

Member of the U.S. House of Representatives from Michigan's 7th district
- In office April 5, 1881 – March 3, 1883
- Preceded by: Omar D. Conger
- Succeeded by: Ezra C. Carleton

28th Speaker of the Michigan House of Representatives
- In office 1877–1880
- Governor: Charles Croswell
- Preceded by: John P. Hoyt
- Succeeded by: Seth C. Moffatt

Member of the Michigan House of Representatives from the Lapeer County district
- In office 1873–1880
- Preceded by: Horace D. Rood
- Succeeded by: George Davenport

Member of the Michigan Senate from the 20th district
- In office January 1, 1881 – March 21, 1881
- Preceded by: Joseph B. Moore
- Succeeded by: William W. Andrus

24th Michigan State Treasurer
- In office 1908
- Governor: Fred M. Warner
- Preceded by: Frank P. Glazier
- Succeeded by: Albert E. Sleeper

Personal details
- Born: John Treadway Rich; April 23, 1841 Conneautville, Pennsylvania, U.S.
- Died: March 28, 1926 (aged 84) St. Petersburg, Florida, U.S.
- Resting place: Mt. Hope Cemetery, Lapeer, Michigan
- Party: Republican
- Spouse: Lucretia M. Winship (m. 1863)
- Relations: Charles Rich (grandfather)

John T. Rich (Note: Some sources list Rich's middle name as "Tyler", some list his middle name as "Treadway".) (April 23, 1841 – March 28, 1926) was an American politician serving as a U.S. representative and the 23rd governor of Michigan.

== Early life ==
Rich was born in Conneautville, Pennsylvania, the son of John W. Rich and Jerusha Treadway Rich. In 1846, he moved with his parents to Addison County, Vermont. There, his mother would die of tuberculosis. In 1848, the family moved to Elba Township, Michigan. He attended the public schools and engaged in agricultural pursuits. On March 12, 1863, he married Lucretia M. Winship.

== Career ==
Rich was a member and chairman of the board of supervisors of Lapeer County from 1869 to 1872. He represented Lapeer County in the Michigan House of Representatives from 1871 to 1880. He served as speaker of the house during his last two terms, starting in 1877. He was also a delegate to the Republican State conventions in 1873, 1875, and 1878.

Rich served in the Michigan Senate, representing the 20th district from January 1, 1881, until March 21, 1881, when he resigned, having been elected to the United States House of Representatives for the 47th Congress to fill the vacancy caused by the resignation of Omar D. Conger, serving from April 5, 1881, to March 4, 1883. He was an unsuccessful candidate for reelection in 1882 to the 48th Congress. In 1887, he was appointed by Governor Cyrus G. Luce as State Railroad Commissioner and served in the position until 1891. He served as a delegate to the Republican National Conventions in 1884 and 1892.

Rich served as governor of Michigan from 1893 to 1897. During his four years in office, a railroad strike, as well as an iron mine strike occurred. In March 1894, Governor Rich removed three officials on the State Canvassing Board, them being Land Commissioner John G. Berry, Secretary of State John W. Jochim, and State Treasurer Joseph F. Hambitzer, for falsifying returns on a salary raise vote for state officeholders.

After leaving office, he served as United States collector of customs at Detroit from February 16, 1898, to January 30, 1906. He was appointed State Treasurer of Michigan by Governor Fred M. Warner on January 23, 1908, to fill the vacancy caused by the resignation of Frank P. Glazier. He was then collector of customs at Port Huron from December 11, 1908, to May 30, 1913.

== Death ==
Rich died in St. Petersburg, Florida, on March 28, 1926. On April 3, he was laid in state in a Presbyterian church in Lapeer and was interred at Mount Hope Cemetery in the same city.

== Notes ==
Party political offices
Preceded by James M. Turner	Republican nominee for Governor of Michigan; 1892, 1894	Succeeded by Hazen S. Pingree
U.S. House of Representatives
Preceded by Omar D. Conger	United States Representative for the 7th congressional district of Michigan; 1881–1883	Succeeded by Ezra C. Carleton
Political offices
Preceded by Edwin B. Winans	Governor of Michigan; 1893–1897	Succeeded by Hazen S. Pingree
Preceded by Frank P. Glazier	Treasurer of Michigan; 1908	Succeeded by Albert E. Sleeper
