= List of Grand Valley State University people =

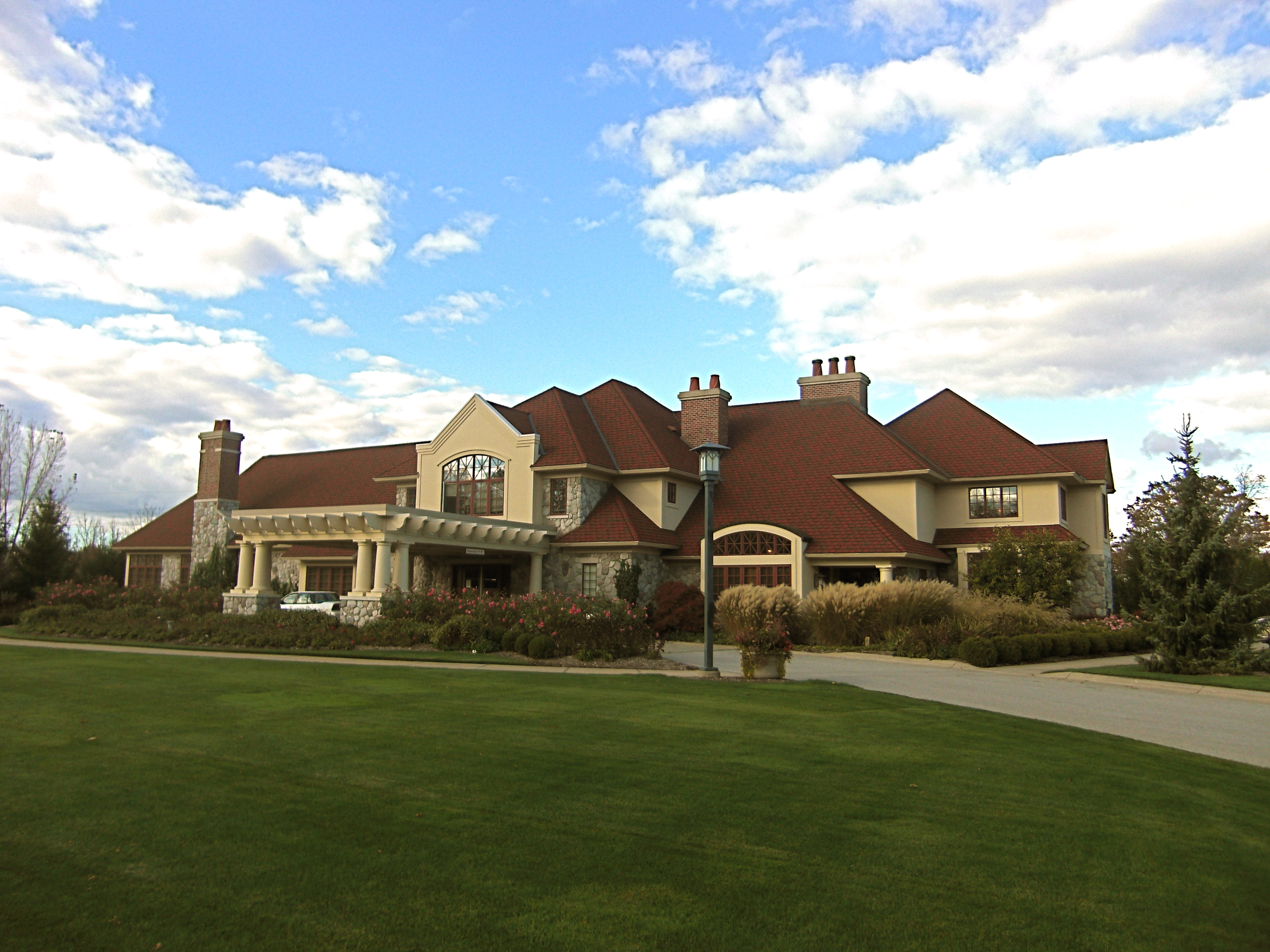
Alumni House on Grand Valley State University–Allendale campus

The list of Grand Valley State University people includes notable alumni, faculty, staff, and presidents. There are over 120,000 alumni who reside in all 50 U.S. states, Canada and other countries.

== Presidents ==
- 1963–1969: James Zumberge
- 1969–2001: Arend Lubbers
- 2001–2006: Mark Murray
- 2006–2019: Thomas J. Haas
- 2019–present: Philomena Mantella

== Alumni ==
=== Arts ===
- Steve Bannatyne – film producer
- Daniel Allen Butler – author and playwright
- The Crane Wives – all four band members (Ben Zito, Dan Rickabus, Kate Pillsbury, Emilee Petersmark)
- Lindsey Drager – author
- Patrick Sheane Duncan – screenwriter, director (Mr. Holland's Opus, Courage Under Fire)
- Hubert Massey – artist
- Lindsey Normington – actress, director, stripper
- Nick Podehl – voice actor who has 14 Earphone Awards and 2 Odyssey Award honors
- Steven Rinella – outdoorsman, conservationist, writer, and television personality known for translating the hunting and fishing lifestyle to a wide variety of audiences
- Wm. Stage – journalist and photographer
- Terry Wolverton – novelist, memoirist, and poet

=== Government and public affairs ===
- Derek Bailey – tribal chairman of the Grand Traverse Band of Ottawa and Chippewa Indians
- John Beyrle – United States ambassador to the Russian Federation
- Brian Calley – Michigan House of Representatives, banker, Republican politician, lieutenant governor of Michigan
- Darnell Earley – former interim mayor of Flint, Michigan; city manager of Saginaw, Michigan
- Frank Foster – member of the Michigan House of Representatives serving the 107th District
- Robert Genetski – member of the Michigan House of Representatives serving the 88th District
- Thomas Hooker – member of the Michigan House of Representatives serving the 77th District
- Rick Outman – member of the Michigan House of Representatives serving the 70th District
- Tommy Remengesau – president of the Republic of Palau
- Elbuchel Sadang – minister of finance of the Republic of Palau
- Michael Sak – former member of the Michigan House of Representatives
- Jon Switalski – member of the Michigan House of Representatives serving the 25th District; former Macomb County commissioner
- Erion Veliaj – former minister of Youth and Social Affairs of Albania, mayor of Tirana; AB Political Science

=== Sports ===
- Howard Bailey (born 1957) – former Detroit Tigers pitcher
- Brandon Barnes (born 1985) – former offensive lineman for the NFL Indianapolis Colts
- Josh Bourke (born 1982)– tackle for the CFL Montreal Alouettes
- Cameron Bradfield – former offensive tackle for Jacksonville Jaguars
- Greg Cadaret – former Major League Baseball pitcher for the Oakland Athletics
- Brandon Carr – former cornerback for the Dallas Cowboys
- Jeff Chadwick – former NFL wide receiver
- Paul Cranmer – former CFL player
- Mark Dewey – former Major League Baseball pitcher
- Ron Essink – former NFL offensive tackle of the Seattle Seahawks
- Tony Ferguson – two–time Collegiate All–American wrestler; professional mixed martial artist; winner of season 13 of The Ultimate Fighter; former UFC Lightweight Interim Champion
- Cullen Finnerty – former NFL quarterback
- Eric Fowler – former NFL wide receiver
- Mike Gravier – NCAA football coach
- Charles Johnson – former NFL wide receiver for the Minnesota Vikings
- Derrick Jones – former NFL defensive tackle/end of the Tennessee Titans
- Margo F. Jonker – assistant softball coach for the United States at the 2000 Summer Olympics in Sydney, Australia; head softball coach of the Central Michigan Chippewas
- Matthew Judon – NFL linebacker for the Atlanta Falcons
- John Keating – Fox Sports Net personality who used the on–air name "Steve Knight" in Grand Rapids
- David Kircus – former NFL wide receiver for the Denver Broncos
- Kevin Lee – former professional MMA fighter, current UFC Lightweight contender
- Tim Lelito – former NFL offensive lineman for the New Orleans Saints
- Keyonta Marshall – former NFL defensive tackle for the New York Jets
- Nick McDonald – former NFL free agent offensive lineman
- Zach Panning – professional runner and NCAA Division II Cross Country runner up
- Kasey Peters – former football player
- Rob Rubick – former NFL tight end of the Detroit Lions
- Bill Sheridan – linebackers coach for the Miami Dolphins
- Dan Skuta – former NFL linebacker who plays for the Jacksonville Jaguars
- Cody Stamann – professional mixed martial artist currently in the UFC's Bantamweight Division
- Matt Thornton – former pitcher for the Chicago White Sox
- Jake Van Tubbergen (born 1998) – basketball player in the Israeli Basketball Premier League
- Dave Whinham – former football coach
- Sarah Zelenka – rower at the 2012 Summer Olympics

=== Others ===
- Sara K. Gould – former president and CEO of the Ms. Foundation for Women
- Marisa Kwiatkowski – journalist and investigative reporter known for reporting the USA Gymnastics' sexual abuse scandal
- Virgil L. Sharpton – administrator at University of Alaska Fairbanks and member of the US Arctic Research Commission
- Glenn Duffie Shriver – convicted of conspiracy to commit espionage for China

== Faculty and staff ==
- Edward Aboufadel – mathematician
- Tom Beck – football head coach, 1985–1990
- Craig Benjamin – historian and former president of the World History Association
- Kelly James Clark – philosopher and theologian
- Mary de Young – sociology professor and author
- Don Dufek Sr. – athletic director, 1972–1976
- Brady Hoke – defensive line coach, 1983; Michigan Wolverines head football coach
- Azfar Hussain – writer, scholar, and translator
- William Harry Jellema – philosopher and theologian
- Brian Kelly – football head coach, 1991–2003; Notre Dame and LSU head football coach
- Chuck Martin – football head coach, 2005–2009; Notre Dame assistant coach, 2010–2013; Miami (Ohio) head football coach
- Monica McFawn Robinson – winner of the 2013 Flannery O'Connor Award for Short Fiction
- Louis Moore – historian
- David Plowden – photographer and lecturer
- Joel Potrykus – film director
- Jay Smith – basketball head coach, 1996–97
- Adrian Tinsley – founding dean of William James College
- Margaret Sellers Walker – professor of public administration, 1993–2002, and associate director of the Dorothy A. Johnson Center for Philanthropy and Nonprofit Leadership
- Alison Stine – poet and author; winner of the 2021 Philip K. Dick Award
- John Varineau – associate conductor of the Grand Rapids Symphony
- Gleaves Whitney – author and director of the Hauenstein Center for Presidential Studies
- Julianne Vanden Wyngaard – carillionist, pianist, and former vice president of The Guild of Carillonneurs in North America
