= Rachael Eubanks =

American treasurer

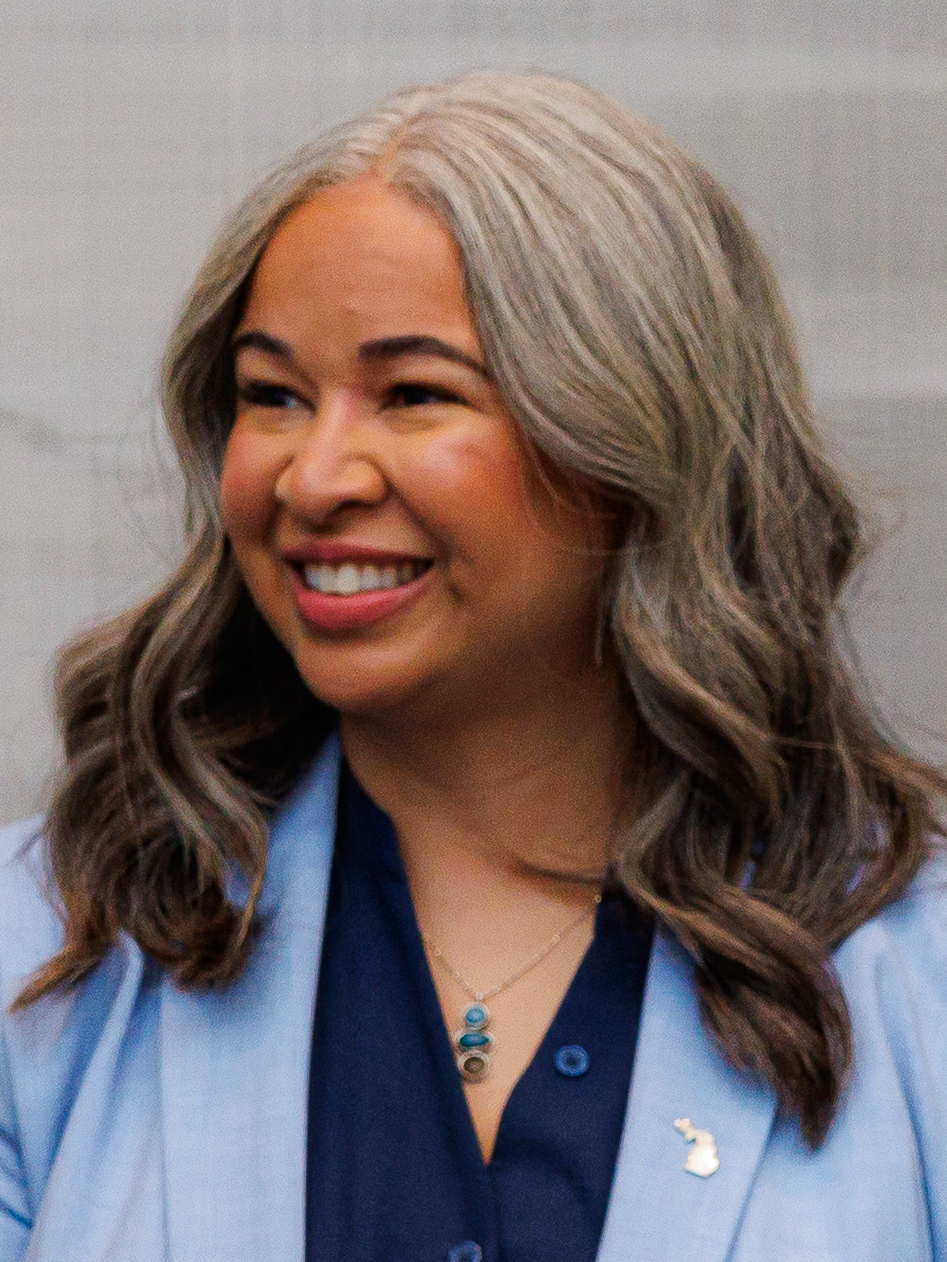
- Eubanks in 2025

47th Treasurer of Michigan
- Incumbent
- Assumed office January 1, 2019
- Governor: Gretchen Whitmer
- Preceded by: Nick Khouri

Personal details
- Born: September 30, 1981 (age 44)
- Spouse: Silas Johnson
- Children: 1
- Education: University of Michigan (BA)

Rachael Anne Eubanks (born September 30, 1981) is an American financial advisor and civil servant serving as the 47th Michigan State Treasurer since 2019. Appointed by Gretchen Whitmer, she is the first woman to hold the position.

== Early life and education ==
Eubanks grew up in East Lansing and graduated from East Lansing High School in 1999. Her mother, Sarah, worked at the state treasury and served as executive director of the Michigan Municipal Bond Authority in 1989. She earned a Bachelor of Arts in economics from the University of Michigan.

== Career ==
Eubanks worked in public finance and investment banking, including as a financial advisor at Robert W. Baird & Co. where she advised previous Michigan State Treasurers Robert Kleine, Andy Dillon, R. Kevin Clinton, and Nick Khouri.

Before being state treasurer, Eubanks was appointed by Governor Rick Snyder to serve on the Michigan Public Service Commission as a utility regulatory commissioner in 2016, and was reappointed in 2017. She stepped down from this position when she was appointed as state treasurer by Governor Gretchen Whitmer in 2019. Eubanks currently serves on the National Association of State Treasurers.

In 2019, Whitmer designated Eubanks her first emergency interim successor— making her acting governor if all other duly elected officials in the line of succession are unavailable. She briefly assumed the position when Whitmer, Garlin Gilchrist, Jocelyn Benson, Dana Nessel, Jeremy Moss, and Joe Tate attended the 2024 Democratic National Convention in Chicago.

== Personal life ==
Eubanks lives in East Lansing and is married to Silas Johnson, a former classmate from high school. They have a daughter.

Political offices
Preceded by Nick Khouri	Treasurer of Michigan; 2019–present	Incumbent
