= Oliver Spaulding =

Oliver Spaulding may refer to:

- Oliver L. Spaulding (1833–1922), American politician from Michigan
- Oliver Lyman Spaulding (general) (1875–1947), American Army general
