= Charles H. Taylor =

Charles H. Taylor may refer to:

- Charles Taylor (North Carolina politician) (born 1941), US congressman from North Carolina
- Charles H. Taylor (Michigan politician) (1813–1889), American politician who served as the Michigan Secretary of State
- Charles H. Taylor (lyricist) (1859–1907), British lyricist
- Charles H. Taylor (publisher) (1846–1921), American journalist and member of the Massachusetts House of Representatives
- Chuck Taylor (salesman) (1901–1969), American basketball player and businessman

== See also ==
- Charles Taylor (disambiguation)
