= Senator McKinney =

Senator McKinney may refer to:

- John McKinney (Michigan politician) (1803–1870), Michigan State Senate
- John P. McKinney (born 1964), Connecticut State Senate
- Paul McKinney (politician) (1923–1995), Pennsylvania State Senate
- Terrell McKinney (born 1990), Nebraska State Senate
