= Howard Lawrence =

Howard Lawrence may refer to:

- Howard Lawrence, member of the band Disclosure
- Howard C. Lawrence, American politician from Michigan
