= Kenneth E. Wing =

Kenneth E. Wing was the ninth president of the State University of New York at Cobleskill, serving from 1992 to 2002.

== Education ==
Wing earned bachelor's, master's and Ph.D. degrees in areas related to agriculture from Cornell University. While at Cornell, he was a member of the Alpha Zeta fraternity.

== Career ==
Wing was dean of the University of Maine's College of Life Sciences and Agriculture, and was director of the Maine Agricultural Experiment Station. He was president of the State University of New York at Cobleskill from 1992 until 2002.

Academic offices
| Preceded by Neal V. Robbins | President of State University of New York at Cobleskill; 1992-2002 | Succeeded by Thomas J. Haas |
