= Zingales =

Zingales is a surname. Notable people with the surname include:

- Francesco Zingales (1884–1959), Italian general
- Luigi Zingales (born 1963), Italian finance professor
- Matteo Zingales (born 1980), Australian film score composer

== See also ==
- Donald P. Zingale, American official
