= Nick Khouri =

American treasurer

46th Treasurer of Michigan
- In office April 20, 2015 – 2018
- Governor: Rick Snyder
- Preceded by: R. Kevin Clinton
- Succeeded by: Rachael A. Eubanks

Personal details
- Born: c. 1957 (age 68–69) Burton, Michigan, U.S.
- Education: University of Michigan (BA); Michigan State University (MA)

Nick A. Khouri (born c. 1957) is an American economic advisor who served as the 46th Treasurer of Michigan from 2015 to 2018, during the administration of Governor Rick Snyder.

== Early life and education ==
Khouri was born around 1957 in Burton, Michigan, where he was also raised. He graduated from Kearsley High School in Genesee Township, Michigan in 1975. Khouri earned a Bachelor of Arts degree in economics from the University of Michigan and a Master of Arts in the same subject from Michigan State University.

== Career ==
Khouri previously served as chief economist to the Michigan Senate Fiscal Agency. Khouri served as chief deputy Michigan State Treasurer under Douglas B. Roberts from 1991 to 1997.

Khouri served as Michigan State Treasurer after being appointed by Governor Rick Snyder. He served in this position from April 20, 2015 until his resignation in 2018. On December 13, 2019, Detroit mayor Mike Duggan appointed Khouri as the city's economic development chief. Khouri assumed this position on January 1, 2020. Khouri retired as Detroit's economic development chief in December 2020, and was replaced by Nicole Sherard-Freeman.

Political offices
Preceded by R. Kevin Clinton	Treasurer of Michigan; 2015–2018	Succeeded by Rachael A. Eubanks
