= James Francis Thomson =

American politician from Michigan

James Francis Thomson (November 19, 1891 – April 21, 1973) was an American politician from the state of Michigan.

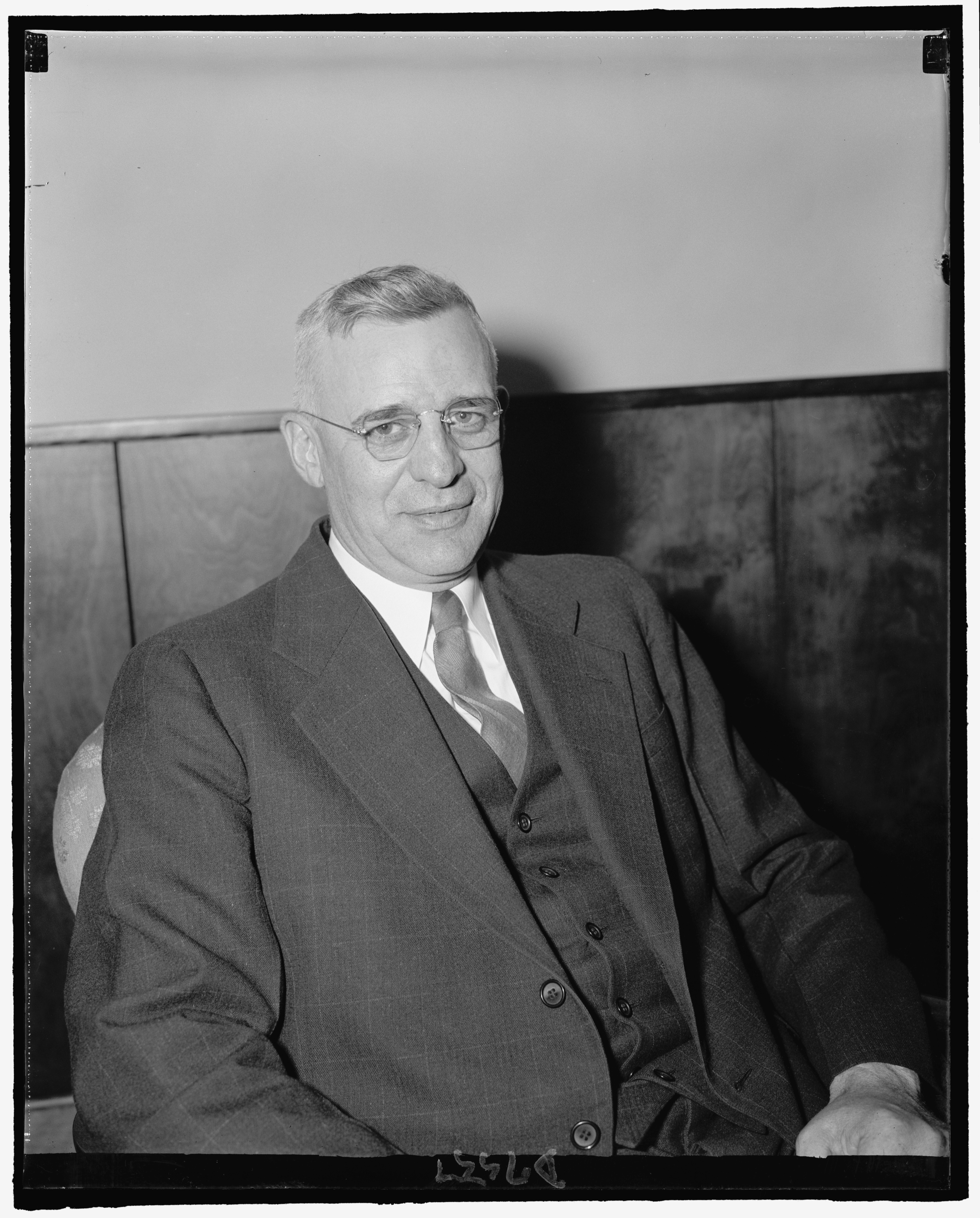

Thomson was born in Jackson County, Michigan, November 19, 1891. He was the son of James C. Thomson and Mary (Dack) Thomson. He resided in Jackson became a farmer and married Florence Elvira Sanford. Thomson was a member of Michigan State House of Representatives from Jackson County 2nd District, 1929–30; defeated in primary, 1924, 1932. He was elected Chairman of the Michigan Republican Party from 1936 to 1939 and Chairman of Jackson County Republican Party, 1939–1941, 1950. He was a candidate in primary for Lieutenant Governor of Michigan, 1940. Thomson was Jackson County Treasurer from 1943 to 1962. He was a delegate to Michigan state constitutional convention from Jackson County 2nd District, 1961–1962. He was a Methodist and member of the Grange, the Freemasons, the Kiwanis, the Lions and the Odd Fellows. James F. Thomson died in Tompkins Township, Jackson County, Michigan on April 21, 1973.

Political offices
Preceded by Samuel T. Metzger	Director of the Michigan Department of Agriculture; 1936–1937	Succeeded by Burr B. Lincoln
Party political offices
Preceded by Howard C. Lawrence	Chairman of the Michigan Republican Party; 1937–1940	Succeeded by Leslie B. Butler
