= Loren E. Monroe =

American politician (1932–2019)

Treasurer of Michigan
- In office September 5, 1978 – 1982
- Governor: William Milliken
- Preceded by: Allison Green
- Succeeded by: Robert A. Bowman

Personal details
- Born: April 5, 1932 Hillsborough County, Florida
- Died: May 29, 2019 (aged 87)
- Education: Wayne State University

Military service
- Allegiance: United States
- Branch/service: United States Army
- Years of service: 1953-1955
- Battles/wars: Korean War

Loren Eugene Monroe Sr. (April 5, 1932 – May 29, 2019) was the first African American Michigan State Treasurer.

== Early life and education ==
Loren E. Monroe was born in Hillsborough County, Florida on April 5, 1932 to parents Eugene and Leona Monroe. Shortly after Loren's birth, the family moved to Thomasville, Georgia. In 1949, he graduated from Frederick Douglass High School in Thomasville. In 1953, Loren was drafted into the United States Army, serving in the Korean War. In the army, he worked as a Morse code interceptor. In 1955, Loren was honorably discharged. From there, Loren and Loreana moved to Detroit. In 1958, Loren earned a B.A. in accounting from Wayne State University. In 1970, Loren earned a J.D., and in 1980 earned a LL.M. from the same university.

== Career ==
In 1970, Monroe was admitted to the Michigan bar. In 1974, Monroe received his Certified Public Accounting certification. Monroe served as a field auditor for the Michigan Department of Treasury from 1959 to 1970. From 1970 to 1976, worked as a tax specialist for the C.P.A. firm, Coopers & Lybrand International. Monroe helped form the law firm Mosley & Monroe, P.C., and was a part of it from 1976 to 1978. On August 18, 1978, Monroe was appointed by Michigan Governor William Milliken to the position of Michigan State Treasurer. The term began on September 5, 1978, and he was officially confirmed on October 31, 1979. He served in this capacity until 1982. In 1980, in his capacity as Michigan Treasurer, he signed a deal with Chrysler CEO Lee A. Iacocca, where the treasury loaned $150 million to the company, which was facing hardship. In 1985, Monroe helped form the firm Pierce, Monroe & Associates, LLC. with Phil Pierce. In 2004, Monroe unsuccessfully ran for the Detroit City Council. In 2006, Mayor Kwame Kilpatrick appointed Monroe Detroit auditor general. In 2013, Monroe retired from the position due to poor health. Monroe was a member of multiple bar associations and accountant groups, including: the Michigan Bar Association, the Wolverine Bar Association, the Detroit Bar Association, the American Institute of Certified Public Accountants, the Michigan Association of Certified Public Accountants, and the National Association of Black Accountants.

== Personal life ==
Monroe married Annie Duncan. Together, they had five children. At some point later, Monroe married Lei'Wan Newby. In 1971, Monroe's oldest son, Loren Jr., died. Monroe was a Prince Hall Freemason. Monroe was Baptist.

== Death ==
Monroe died on May 29, 2019. His funeral serves were held at Chapel Hill Baptist Church in Detroit on June 4, 2019.

== Legacy ==
In 2013, in the third edition of the book Black Firsts: 4,000 Ground-Breaking and Pioneering Historical Events, Monroe's achievement of being the first African-American Michigan State Treasurer is listed, and he is placed in a list of the "100 Most Influential Black Americans.”

Political offices
Preceded by Allison Green	Treasurer of Michigan; 1978–1982	Succeeded by Robert A. Bowman
