= Silas M. Holmes =

American politician

Treasurer of Michigan
- In office 1855–1858
- Preceded by: Bernard C. Whittemore
- Succeeded by: John McKinney

Personal details
- Born: July 21, 1816 Stonington, Connecticut
- Died: June 1905 (aged 88) Corning, California
- Party: Republican
- Other political affiliations: Liberty; Free Soil; Whig

Silas M. Holmes (July 21, 1816 – June 1905) was a Michigan politician.

== Early life ==
Holmes was born in Stonington, Connecticut on July 21, 1816.

== Career ==
In 1844, Holmes was nominated as the abolitionist candidate for Wayne County clerk. In 1845, Holmes was nominated by the Liberty Party as Detroit alderman. In 1848, Holmes was nominated by the Whig Party as Wayne County treasurer. In 1852, Holmes served as the Free Soil Party nominee for Michigan State Treasurer.

In the 1850s, Holmes was a leading dry goods merchant in Detroit. In 1854, Holmes was nominated for the position of Michigan State Treasurer on the first Republican ticket in the state. He was elected to that position, and became the first Republican Michigan State Treasurer in 1855. He served in this capacity until 1858. In 1887, Holmes moved away from Detroit to San Francisco, California, where he engaged in business.

== Personal life ==
Holmes had ten children, and he was survived by four of them. Holmes was a member of the Michigan State Temperance Society.

== Death ==
Holmes died in June 1905 in Corning, California.

Political offices
Preceded by Bernard C. Whittemore	State Treasurer of Michigan; 1855-1858	Succeeded by John McKinney
