= Allison Green =

American politician

Allison R. Green
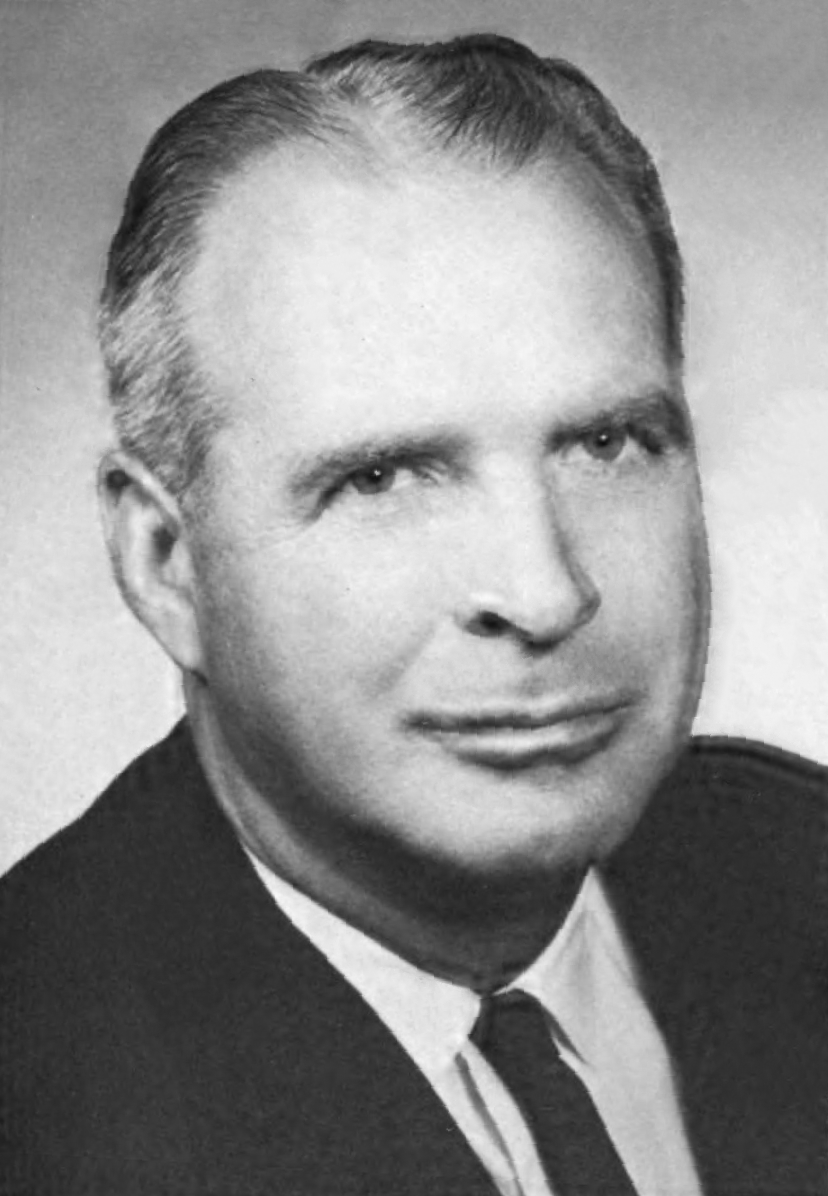

57th Speaker of the Michigan House of Representatives
- In office January 9, 1963 – December 31, 1964
- Preceded by: Don R. Pears
- Succeeded by: Joseph J. Kowalski

Member of the Michigan House of Representatives from the Tuscola County district
- In office January 1, 1951 – December 31, 1964
- Preceded by: James Kirk
- Succeeded by: District abolished

36th Michigan State Treasurer
- In office September 14, 1965 – September 4, 1978
- Governor: George Romney; William Milliken
- Preceded by: Sanford A. Brown
- Succeeded by: Loren E. Monroe

Personal details
- Born: October 28, 1911 Caro, Michigan
- Died: March 26, 2005 (aged 93) Cass City, Michigan
- Party: Republican
- Spouse: Marjorie Denhoff
- Children: Joan Chapin, James Green, Thomas Green, Marjorie Green and Robert Green
- Education: Central Michigan University

Allison R. Green (October 28, 1911 – March 26, 2005) was a Republican politician from Michigan who served in the Michigan House of Representatives, and as its Speaker during the 72nd Legislature. He was also appointed by Governor George Romney as Michigan's state treasurer in 1965, retiring from that position in 1978 as the longest-serving treasurer in Michigan history.

Green became interested and learned about politics and state government by reading the Michigan Manual, the biennial publication which lists information about Michigan's history, constitutions, government officials, and institutions.

Green was a member of the original Tuscola County Board of Education and served on the board of directors of the Kingston State Bank.

Party political offices
Preceded by Norman O. Stockmeyer	Republican nominee for Michigan Secretary of State; 1964	Succeeded by George Washington
Political offices
Preceded by Sanford A. Brown	Treasurer of Michigan; 1965–1978	Succeeded by Loren E. Monroe
