= Thomas J. Haas =

American academic (born 1951)

- Born: 1955 (age 70–71)
- Other name: T-Haas
- Education: U.S. Coast Guard Academy; University of Michigan; Rensselaer Polytechnic Institute; University of Connecticut
- Occupation: President of Grand Valley State University
- Years active: 2006 - 2019 (13 years)
- Predecessor: Mark Murray
- Successor: Philomena Mantella
- Spouse: Marcia J. Haas

Thomas Joseph Haas (born March 5, 1951) is an American academic who is a former president of Grand Valley State University (GVSU) and a chemistry professor. He currently holds the title of President Emeritus. Prior to serving at GVSU, Haas was president of the State University of New York at Cobleskill from 2003 to 2006. In 2018, Haas announced his retirement from the GVSU presidency. The GVSU Board of Trustees selected Philomena Mantella as the university's next president, effective July 1, 2019.

== Education ==
Haas graduated with honors in 1973 from the U.S. Coast Guard Academy. He earned two M.S. degrees, one in environmental health sciences and the other in chemistry from the University of Michigan and another M.S. degree in human resource management from Rensselaer Polytechnic Institute. He also earned a Ph.D. in chemistry from University of Connecticut. Haas has also had fellowship experiences that include Yale University Faculty Fellow and completed executive leadership programs at Harvard University.

== Military service ==
Haas served for over twenty years in the United States Coast Guard, most of which was spent at the Coast Guard Academy as a chemistry professor and a member of the Permanent Commissioned Teaching Staff. Prior to serving at the Academy, Haas completed two years service on board the U.S. Coast Guard Cutter ACACIA homeported in Port Huron, Michigan.

== Sustainability and environment ==
On March 21, 2010, Haas was named one of the "Michigan Green Leaders for 2010" by the Detroit Free Press, for his leadership in environmental stewardship across GVSU's campus and in the region for conservation, emissions reduction, building practices, local food advocacy and other such environmental efforts.

Academic offices
Preceded by Mark Murray	President of Grand Valley State University; 2006-2019	Succeeded by Philomena V. Mantella
Preceded by Kenneth E. Wing	President of State University of New York at Cobleskill; 2003-2006	Succeeded by Donald P. Zingale
