= Oliver L. Spaulding =

American politician (1833–1922)

Oliver Lyman Spaulding
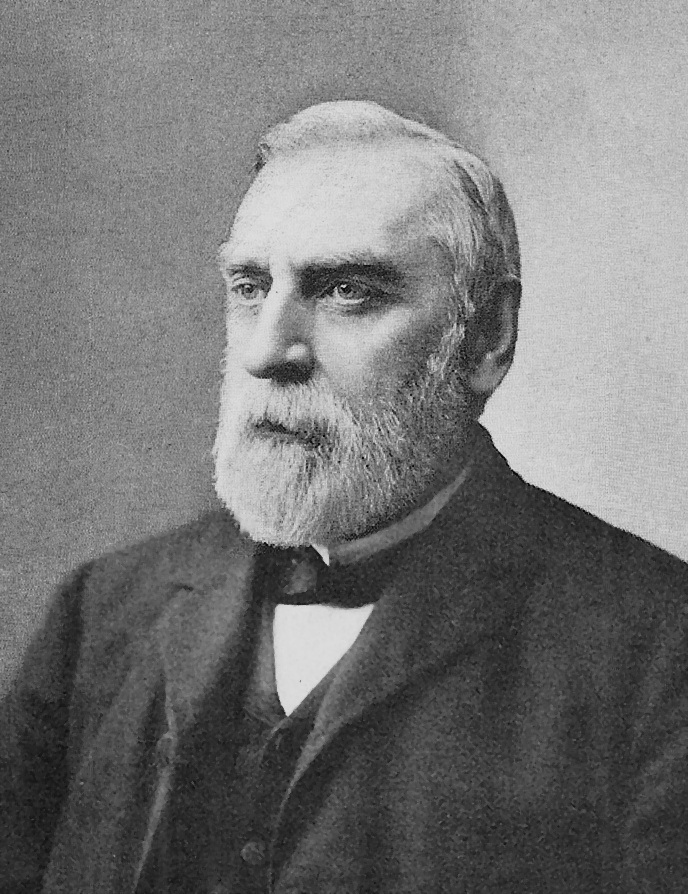

Member of the U.S. House of Representatives from Michigan's 6th district
- In office March 4, 1881 – March 3, 1883
- Preceded by: Mark S. Brewer
- Succeeded by: Edwin B. Winans

Michigan Secretary of State
- In office 1866–1870
- Governor: Henry H. Crapo; Henry P. Baldwin
- Preceded by: James B. Porter
- Succeeded by: Daniel Striker

Personal details
- Born: August 2, 1833 Jaffrey, New Hampshire, U.S.
- Died: July 30, 1922 (aged 88) Washington, D.C., U.S.
- Resting place: Arlington National Cemetery
- Party: Republican
- Spouse: Mary Cecelia Swegles
- Relations: Oliver Lyman Spaulding (son)
- Education: Oberlin College
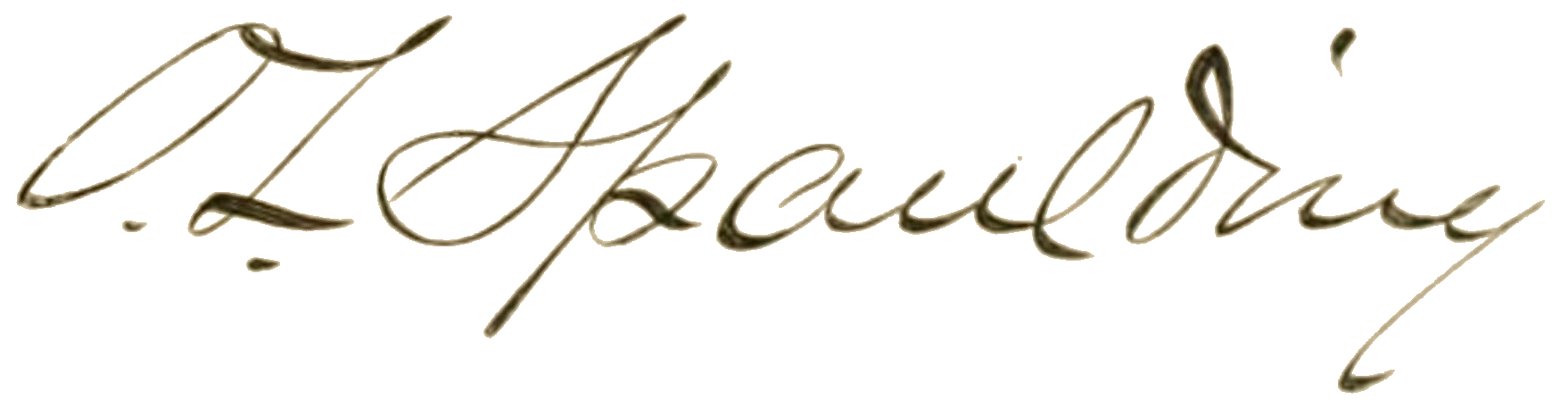
- Signature

Military service
- Branch/service: United States Army; Union Army
- Rank: Colonel; Brevet Brigadier General
- Commands: 23rd Michigan Infantry Regiment
- Battles/wars: American Civil War

Oliver Lyman Spaulding (August 2, 1833 – July 30, 1922) was a soldier and politician from the U.S. state of Michigan.

== Early life and education ==
Spaulding was born in Jaffrey, New Hampshire on August 2, 1833. He completed preparatory studies, graduated from Oberlin College of Ohio in 1855, and moved to Michigan where he taught school. He studied law, was admitted to the bar in 1858 and commenced practice in St. Johns, Michigan. He was regent of the University of Michigan at Ann Arbor from 1858 to 1864.

== Career ==
During the Civil War, Spaulding served in the Union Army as a captain in the 23rd Michigan Infantry Regiment. He eventually was promoted to colonel and later was brevetted brigadier general. Afterwards he resumed the practice of law in St. Johns.

Spaulding served as Michigan Secretary of State from 1866 to 1870. Afterwards, he became a member of the Republican State committee from 1871 to 1878. He declined the position of United States district judge of the Utah Territory in 1871 and later served as special agent of the United States Treasury Department from 1875 to 1881.

Spaulding was elected as a Republican from Michigan's 6th congressional district to the 46th Congress serving from March 4, 1881 to March 3, 1883. He was an unsuccessful candidate for reelection in 1882. He also served as chairman of the commission sent to the Sandwich Islands to investigate alleged violations of the Hawaiian reciprocity treaty in 1883.

Oliver Spaulding again served as a special agent of the United States Treasury in 1885, 1889, and 1890 and then as Assistant U.S. Secretary of the Treasury from 1890 to 1893 during the Benjamin Harrison administration and 1897 to 1903 during the McKinley administration. He was also president of the first International American Customs Congress, held in New York City in January 1903 and again a special agent of the United States Treasury from 1903 to 1909 and then customs agent from 1909 to 1916.

== Personal life ==
He married Mary Cecilia Swegles, the daughter of John Swegles Jr., on August 12, 1862. Their son, Oliver Lyman Spaulding, served as a brigadier general during World War I. Another son, Thomas Marshall Spaulding (May 18, 1882 – April 10, 1973), served as a colonel in both World War I and World War II. He was a noted non-fiction author, writing on subjects like biography and Hawaiian history.

== Death and legacy ==
Oliver L. Spaulding died in Washington, D.C., and is buried at Arlington National Cemetery, in Arlington, Virginia.

Political offices
Preceded by James B. Porter	Secretary of State of Michigan; 1867–1871	Succeeded by Daniel Striker
U.S. House of Representatives
Preceded by Mark S. Brewer	United States Representative for the 6th congressional district of Michigan; 1881–1883	Succeeded by Edwin B. Winans
