= Gilman M. Dame =

American politician

Gilman Dame

Chair of the Michigan Republican Party
- In office 1914–1916
- Preceded by: Alex Groesbeck
- Succeeded by: John D. Mangum

Personal details
- Party: Republican

Gilman M. Dame was an American politician from Michigan who served as the chairman of the Michigan Republican Party from 1914 to 1916. Dame resided in Northport, Leelanau County, Michigan.

Party political offices
Preceded by Alex Groesbeck	Chairman of the Michigan Republican Party; 1914– 1916	Succeeded by John D. Mangum
