= George L. Maltz =

Michigan politician (1842–1910)

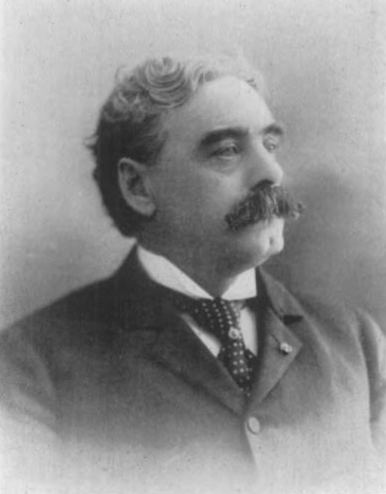

Michigan State Treasurer
- In office 1887–1891

Personal details
- Born: George Lewis Maltz; September 30, 1842 Brooklyn, New York
- Died: August 1, 1910 (aged 67) St. Clair Flats, Michigan
- Occupation: Banker, politician

George Lewis Maltz (September 30, 1842 – August 1, 1910) was an American banker and politician. He served as treasurer of the state of Michigan from 1887 to 1891, commissioner of the state banking department from 1898 to 1900, and was a regent of the University of Michigan from 1877 until 1880.

== Life ==
George Lewis Maltz was born in Brooklyn, New York, September 30, 1842. He removed to Detroit with his parents in 1846, and when sixteen years old was appointed ticket agent for the Grand Trunk Railway.

At the commencement of the Civil War he resigned this position and enlisted as a private in the Fourth Michigan Infantry. He served three full years, and rose to the rank of First Lieutenant. He was confined two months in Libby Prison, after which he was exchanged and returned to his command.

During General Grant's campaign before Richmond he was severely wounded, early in June 1864, and was mustered out of service with his regiment at the end of that month. Upon his return to Detroit he was appointed Assistant Assessor of Internal Revenue, and afterwards cashier of the Internal Revenue Office.

In 1872 he removed to Alpena, Michigan, and founded the Exchange Bank of George L. Maltz and Company, being the pioneer banker of that section of the State. He was State Treasurer from 1887 to 1891. From 1898 to 1900 he was Commissioner of the State Banking Department.

He was elected regent of the University of Michigan in 1877 for the full term of eight years from January 1, following, but resigned the office February 6, 1880.

He died August 1, 1910, at his daughter's summer cottage near the St. Clair Flats.

== Notes ==
Political offices
Preceded by Edward H. Butler	Treasurer of Michigan; 1887–1890	Succeeded by Frederick Braastad
