= John D. Mangum =

American politician

John D. Mangum (c. 1859 – 22 December 1918) was a Michigan politician and chairman of the Michigan Republican Party from 1916 to 1918.

He and his family resided in Marquette, Michigan. He was Chairman of the Michigan Republican Party 1916–18.

Party political offices
Preceded by Gilman M. Dame	Chairman of the Michigan Republican Party; 1914– 1916	Succeeded by Burt D. Cady
