= Burt D. Cady =

American politician (1874–1952)

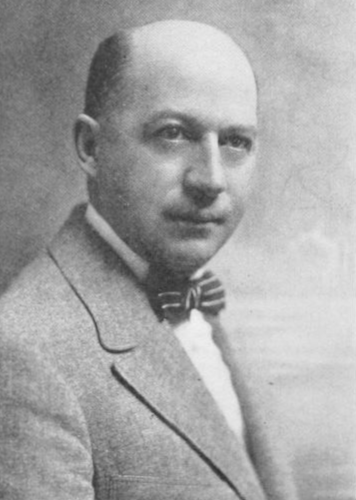

Member of the Michigan Senate from the 11th district
- In office 1907–1908
- Preceded by: George N. Jones
- Succeeded by: James E. Weter

Personal details
- Born: Burt Duward Cady; July 25, 1874 Port Huron, Michigan
- Died: July 24, 1952 (aged 77) Port Huron, Michigan
- Party: Republican
- Occupation: Lawyer, politician

Burt Duward Cady (July 25, 1874 – July 24, 1952) was an American politician from the state of Michigan.

== Biography ==
Cady was born in Port Huron, St. Clair County, Michigan, July 25, 1874 where he would reside and become a lawyer. He was a member of Michigan State Senate 11th District, 1907–1908. He was a delegate to Republican National Convention from Michigan, 1916 (alternate), 1920, and 1928 (alternate). Cady was Chairman of the Michigan Republican Party, 1919–1925. He died at Port Huron on July 24, 1952.

Party political offices
Preceded by John D. Mangum	Chairman of the Michigan Republican Party; 1919– 1925	Succeeded by Kennedy L. Potter
