= Oliver Lyman Spaulding (general) =

U.S. Army brigadier general

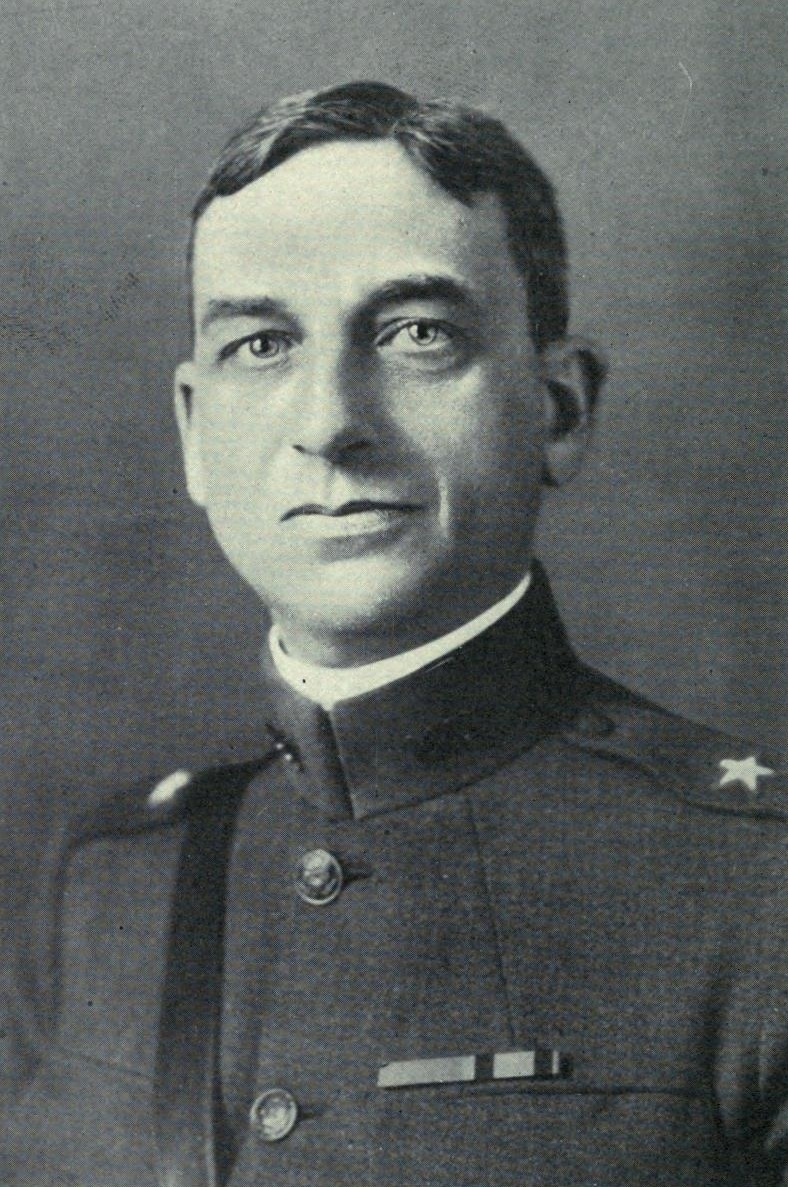
- From 1921's The Official History of the Eighty-Sixth Division
- Born: June 27, 1875; St. Johns, Michigan, U.S.
- Died: March 27, 1947 (aged 71); Washington, D.C.
- Burial place: Arlington National Cemetery
- Alma mater: University of Michigan (AB, 1895); University of Michigan Law School (LL.B., 1896); Harvard University (M.A., 1932)
- Spouse: Alice Chandler (m. 1902–1947, his death)
- Children: 1
- Relatives: Oliver L. Spaulding (father); John Swegles Jr. (grandfather)
- Military career
- Allegiance: United States
- Service: United States Army
- Service years: 1898–1939, 1941–1946
- Rank: Brigadier General
- Service number: 0–703
- Unit: U.S. Army Field Artillery Branch
- Commands: 100th Coast Artillery Company; 45th Coast Artillery Company; 1st Coast Artillery Company; 4th Coast Artillery Company; 161st Field Artillery Brigade; 55th Field Artillery Brigade; 165th Field Artillery Brigade; Historical Section, American Expeditionary Forces; 13th Field Artillery Regiment; Historical Section, United States Army War College
- Wars: China Relief Expedition; Philippine–American War; Pancho Villa Expedition; World War I World War II
- Awards: Army Distinguished Service Medal; Legion of Merit; Order of the Black Star (Commander) (France)
- Other work: Historian and author

Oliver Lyman Spaulding Jr. (June 27, 1875 – March 27, 1947) was a career officer in the United States Army. A veteran of the China Relief Expedition, Philippine–American War, Pancho Villa Expedition, World War I, and World War II, he attained the rank of brigadier general, and was a recipient of the Army Distinguished Service Medal and Legion of Merit from the United States, and the Order of the Black Star (Commander) from France.

A native of St. Johns, Michigan, Spaulding was the son of Oliver L. Spaulding, a Union Army veteran of the American Civil War who attained the rank of brigadier general by brevet and later served as Michigan Secretary of State and a member of the United States House of Representatives. Spaulding graduated from Washington, D.C.'s Central High School in 1891, and received a Bachelor of Arts degree from the University of Michigan in 1895 and a Bachelor of Laws from the University of Michigan Law School in 1896. In 1898, Spaulding applied for an army commission and was appointed a second lieutenant of Field Artillery.

Spaulding's initial assignments included a posting to Alaska and participation in the China Relief Expedition. He was a 1903 graduate of the Artillery School at Fort Monroe, and a 1905 graduate of the United States Army Command and General Staff College. After serving as an instructor at the staff college, in 1911, he graduated from the United States Army War College. After service in the Philippines for the second time and assignment to the Mexico–United States border during the Pancho Villa Expedition, Spaulding served as assistant commandant of the Field Artillery School at Fort Sill. During World War I, Spaulding served in Europe as commander of several Field Artillery brigades and chief of the historical section on the American Expeditionary Forces staff, and received promotion to temporary brigadier general. Spaulding's historical works were published beginning in 1918, and he was the author of six books.

After World War I, Spaulding was an instructor at the Army War College from 1919 to 1924, served as commander of the 13th Field Artillery Regiment in Hawaii from 1926 to 1929, and was assigned as professor of military science at Harvard University from 1929 to 1935. In 1932, he received a Master of Arts degree from Harvard. From 1935 until his June 1939 retirement, Spaulding was again assigned as an instructor at the Army War College. During his retirement, he was a lecturer in history at the Lowell Institute and George Washington University. In March 1941, he was recalled to active duty for World War II and served as an instructor at the Army War College. After retiring for the second time in April 1946, Spaulding resided in Washington, D.C. He died in Washington on March 27, 1947, and was buried at Arlington National Cemetery.

== Early life ==
Oliver L. Spaulding Jr. was born in St. Johns, Michigan on June 27, 1875, the son of Oliver L. Spaulding and Mary Cecelia (Swegles) Spaulding, the daughter of John Swegles Jr. He graduated from Washington, D.C.'s Central High School in 1891, then began attendance at the University of Michigan. Spaulding graduated with a A.B. degree in 1895, then began attendance at the University of Michigan Law School, from which he received his LL.B. in 1896. After his law school graduation, Spaulding continued to study law at a firm in Chicago.

== Start of career ==
With the United States Army expanding for the Spanish–American War, in 1898, Spaulding applied for an army commission. His application was approved, and he was appointed a second lieutenant of Field Artillery. Initially assigned to the 3rd Field Artillery Regiment in Alaska, Spaulding subsequently took part with his regiment in the 1900 China Relief Expedition. In 1901, he received promotion to first lieutenant. In 1903, he graduated from the Artillery School at Fort Monroe, and was promoted to captain. From 1903 to 1904 he commanded the 100th Coast Artillery Company at Fort Terry, New York. He was a 1905 graduate of the United States Army Staff College.

After serving as an instructor at the staff college, Spaulding was assigned to command the 45th Coast Artillery Company at Fort Monroe. In 1906, he assumed command of the 1st Coast Artillery Company at Fort De Soto. After another assignment as an instructor at the command and general staff college, he attended the United States Army War College, from which he graduated in 1911. After service as an advisor to National Guard artillery units in Pennsylvania, Virginia, and the District of Columbia and a second tour of duty in the Philippines, Spaulding was assigned to the Mexico–United States border during the Pancho Villa Expedition. In November 1912, he was assigned to command the 4th Coast Artillery Company at Fort Mott, New Jersey. In the years immediately prior to World War I, Spaulding served as assistant commandant of the Field Artillery School at Fort Sill.

== Continued career ==
Spaulding was promoted to major and lieutenant colonel in 1917. In 1918, he was promoted to colonel, and he performed temporary duty as inspector of artillery units preparing to depart for combat in France. During the First World War, Spaulding served in France, Luxembourg, and Germany as commander of the 161st, 55th, and 165th Field Artillery Brigades with the temporary rank of brigadier general. After the war, he was chief of the historical section on the American Expeditionary Forces staff with the temporary rank of brigadier general. Spaulding's historical works were published beginning in 1918, and he was the author of six books.

From 1920 to 1925, Spaulding taught history at the Army War College with the rank of colonel. He was assigned to command the 13th Field Artillery Regiment in Hawaii in 1926, and he remained there until 1929. He was professor of military science at Harvard University from 1929 to 1935, and received his M.A. degree from Harvard in 1932. Spaulding taught again at the war college from 1935 to 1939. He retired in June 1939 after attaining the mandatory retirement age of 64. Legislation passed in 1930 permitted general officers from World War I to retire at their highest wartime rank, and at retirement Spaulding was promoted to brigadier general on the retired list.

== Later years and death ==
In retirement, Spaulding lectured on history at the Lowell Institute and at George Washington University. In March 1941, he was recalled to active duty for World War II and served as chief of the war college's historical section until the end of the war. After the war, Spaulding resided in Washington, D.C. He died in Washington on March 27, 1947, and was buried at Arlington National Cemetery.

In 1909, Spaulding was one of the founders of the United States Field Artillery Association; he served on the organization's first executive council, and subsequently held the position of secretary-treasurer. He was a member of Phi Beta Kappa, Beta Theta Pi, and Phi Delta Phi. In addition, he joined the American Legion at its founding, and was a member of the Military Order of the Loyal Legion of the United States as a result of his father's Civil War service. Spaulding was also a Freemason and a member of the American Historical Association. After his service in China, Spaulding became a member of the Military Order of the Dragon. As a result of his service in the Philippines, he belonged to the Military Order of the Carabao.

== Published works ==
Spaulding's books included: Notes on Field Artillery (1918); Warfare: A Study of Military Methods From the Earliest Times (1925); The United States Army In War and Peace (four volumes) (1937); Pen And Sword In Greece and Rome (1937); The Second Division A.E.F. in France 1917–19 (1937); and Ahriman, A Study In Aerial Bombardment (1939).

== Awards ==
For his World War I service, Spaulding received the Army Distinguished Service Medal (Note: The citation for Spaulding's DSM reads: War Department, General Orders No. 19 (1920): The President of the United States of America, authorized by Act of Congress, July 9, 1918, takes pleasure in presenting the Army Distinguished Service Medal to Lieutenant Colonel (Field Artillery) Oliver L. Spaulding, Jr., United States Army, for exceptionally meritorious and distinguished services to the Government of the United States, in a duty of great responsibility during World War I, as Assistant Commandant, School of Fire for Field Artillery, Fort Sill, Oklahoma, from December 1917 to May 1918. Lieutenant Colonel Spaulding's constructive and administrative ability was of great value in the remarkable and successful expansion of that school to meet the war requirements of the Field Artillery. In especial, his work in connection with the coordination and development of the course of instruction contributed materially to the excellence of the Field Artillery education received by thousands of officers.) from the United States and the Order of the Black Star (Commander) from France. For his service during World War II, Spaulding was a recipient of the Legion of Merit.

In 1938, Spaulding received the honorary degree of LL.D. from the University of Michigan.

== Family ==
On December 29, 1902, Spaulding married Alice Chandler (1874–1957). They were married until his death, and were the parents of a son, Edward Chandler Spaulding (1912–1975). Edward C. Spaulding was a career army officer who attained the rank of colonel and was a veteran of World War II, the Korean War, and the Vietnam War.
