= Bernard C. Whittemore =

American politician

Treasurer of Michigan
- In office 1850–1854
- Preceded by: George B. Cooper
- Succeeded by: Silas M. Holmes

Personal details
- Born: 1807 New York
- Died: December 7, 1856 (age 48-48)
- Party: Democratic

Bernard C. Whittemore (1807 – December 7, 1856) served as the Treasurer of Michigan.

Whittemore was born near Rome, New York. He later moved to Pontiac, Michigan.

Whittemore served as Michigan State Treasurer from 1850 to 1854. Whittemore was a Democrat.

Political offices
Preceded by George B. Cooper	Treasurer of Michigan; 1850–1854	Succeeded by Silas M. Holmes
