= Jay B. Rising =

American treasurer

42nd Treasurer of Michigan
- In office January 6, 2003 – February 2006
- Governor: Jennifer Granholm
- Preceded by: Douglas B. Roberts
- Succeeded by: Robert Kleine

Personal details
- Education: University of Michigan; Wayne State University

Jay B. Rising served as the 42nd Treasurer of Michigan.

== Education ==
Rising earned an undergraduate degree from the University of Michigan and a J.D. degree from Wayne State University Law School.

== Career ==
Rising served Chief Deputy Michigan State Treasurer as Deputy Michigan State Treasurer for Policy Development and Finance from 1983 to 1991. Rising first joined the law firm Miller, Canfield, Paddock and Stone in 1991. He worked for this firm until 1998. On January 6, 2003, Rising was appointed by Governor Jennifer Granholm to the position of Michigan State Treasurer. Rising served in this position until late February 2006, when he was offered the positions of vice president and chief financial officer at Detroit Medical Center.

Political offices
Preceded by Douglas B. Roberts	Treasurer of Michigan; 2003–2006	Succeeded by Robert Kleine
