= Donald P. Zingale =

11th president of the State University of New York

Donald P. Zingale was the 11th president of the State University of New York at Cobleskill.

== Early life and education ==
Zingale grew up in Brooklyn and earned his B.S. degree from Brooklyn College in 1967. He earned his master's degree in physical education from the University of Massachusetts Amherst in 1969 and his Ph.D. in physical education from Ohio State University in 1973. In 1984 he earned a master's degree in social work.

== Career ==
Zingle joined the faculty at California State University, Sacramento. In 2004 he became vice president of academic affairs at the California Maritime Academy, and in 2008 he became president of the State University of New York at Cobleskill.

Academic offices
Preceded by Thomas J. Haas	President of State University of New York at Cobleskill; 2008-2011	Succeeded by Incumbent
