= George W. Germain =

American politician

Member of the Michigan House of Representatives from the Ionia County 1st district
- In office January 7, 1857 – December 31, 1858
- Succeeded by: Almeron Newman

Treasurer of Michigan
- In office 1841 – January 13, 1842
- Preceded by: Robert Stuart
- Succeeded by: John J. Adam

Personal details
- Born: June 4, 1818 Marcellus, New York, US
- Died: April 15, 1906 (aged 87) North Plains Township, Michigan, US
- Party: Whig; Republican (by 1856)

George W. Germain, also spelled George W. Jermain, (June 4, 1818 – April 15, 1906) was a Michigan politician.

== Early life ==
Germain was born on June 4, 1818, in Marcellus, New York. In 1843, Germain bought a farm in North Plains Township, Michigan.

== Career ==
In 1841, Germain was appointed by the Governor of Michigan to the position of Michigan State Treasurer. He served in this position until the Michigan Legislature appointed John J. Adam to replace him on January 13, 1842. In 1844, Germain was elected as the first clerk of North Plains Township. At first, Germain was a member of the Whig Party and held similar beliefs to that of William H. Seward and Horace Greeley. By 1856, Germain had become a Republican. On November 4, 1856, Germain was elected to the Michigan House of Representatives, where he represented the Ionia County 1st district from January 7, 1857, to December 31, 1858. He was among the first Republicans elected to the state legislature. In 1867, Germain served as a delegate from Ionia County in the Michigan state constitutional convention.

== Death ==
Germain died in his home at North Plains on April 15, 1906.
