= John J. Adam =

Scottish-American teacher, businessman, and politician from Michigan

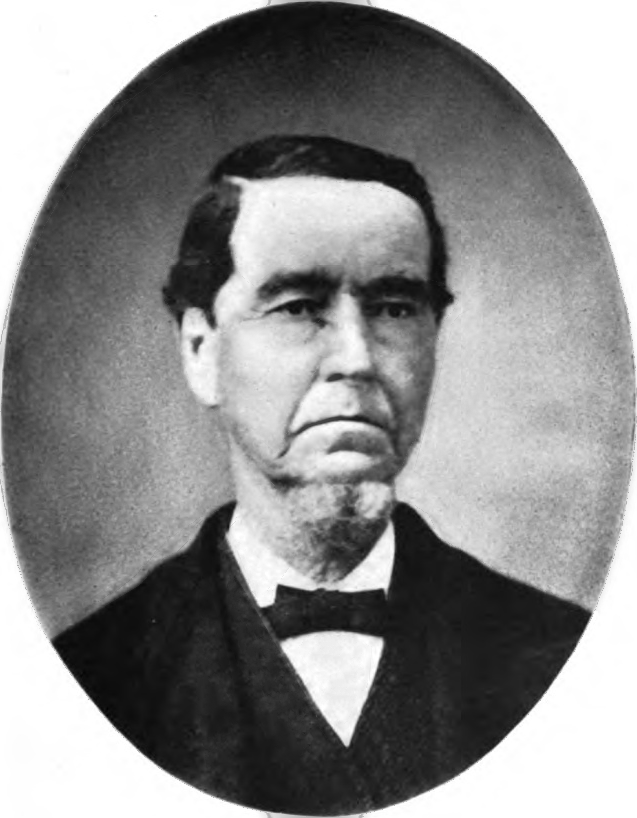

Michigan State Treasurer
- In office March 13, 1842 – May 31, 1845
- Governor: John S. Barry
- Preceded by: George W. Germain
- Succeeded by: George R. Redfield

Michigan Auditor General
- In office June 1, 1845 – February 20, 1846
- Governor: John S. Barry; Alpheus Felch
- Preceded by: Charles G. Hammond
- Succeeded by: Digby V. Bell
- In office March 21, 1848 – January 6, 1851
- Governor: Epaphroditus Ransom; John S. Barry
- Preceded by: Digby V. Bell
- Succeeded by: John Swegles Jr.

Member of the Michigan Senate
- In office January 6, 1840 – January 3, 1842

Member of the Michigan House of Representatives
- In office January 7, 1839 – January 6, 1840
- In office January 4, 1847 – January 3, 1848
- In office January 4, 1871 – January 1, 1873

Personal details
- Born: October 30, 1807 Paisley, Scotland
- Died: July 8, 1888 (aged 80) Tecumseh, Michigan
- Party: Democratic
- Spouse(s): Armenia Bradley, Cornelia M. Woimple
- Children: 2

John J. Adam (October 30, 1807 – July 8, 1888) was a Scottish-American teacher, businessman, and politician. He served in a number of elected and appointed positions in the first years of Michigan's statehood, including state treasurer, auditor general, and regent of the University of Michigan, as well as multiple terms in the state house of representatives and state senate.

== Biography ==
Adam was born in Paisley, Scotland, on October 30, 1807, to Robert Adam and Mary Crichton. His father was a builder and lumber dealer who died when Adam was two years old, after which his mother moved back to her home county of Dumfriesshire, settling in Closeburn. Adam and his older brother Thomas both attended Wallace Hall and then the University of Glasgow. John Adam graduated from the University of Glasgow in 1826 with a Master of Arts degree.

He left Scotland on July 4, 1826, and sailed to Baltimore, Maryland, arriving 46 days later. He settled in Crawford County, Pennsylvania, and began teaching languages and mathematics at Meadville Academy, where one of his students was George W. Cullum. Adam's brother Thomas came to the U.S. in 1827 and went on to have a career in medicine, publishing, and the military.

Adam later moved to Tecumseh, Michigan, and married Armenia Bradley, a native of Barre, New York, in August 1838. They had two children, Charles, born in 1844, and Minnie, born in 1846. His wife died on July 8, 1870, and Adam married a widowed sister of hers, Cornelia M. Woimple, on November 5, 1873.

=== Political career ===
Adam moved to Tecumseh, Michigan, and was elected as one of eight delegates from Lenawee County to the convention that drafted the first Constitution of Michigan in 1835. He served as secretary of the Michigan Senate for its first three sessions from 1835 to 1838. He was elected to the Michigan House of Representatives and served for one session in 1839, after which he was elected to the Michigan Senate and served from 1840 to 1841. Following that, he was elected state treasurer and served from 1842 until 1845, when Governor John S. Barry appointed him auditor general to complete the term of the deceased Charles G. Hammond. He served until 1847, when he was re-elected as a state representative, and after serving in the legislature for one year he was re-appointed auditor general from 1848 to 1851. Late in life, he was re-elected to the legislature and served in the 1871–1872 session. Adam was a Democrat and served on the party's state central committee.

He was appointed to the first Board of Regents of the University of Michigan in 1837 and served until his resignation in 1840. During this time he helped to establish a branch of the university at Tecumseh; these branches offered high school-level instruction in various courses depending on whether the student was to become a teacher, go to college, or to finish school at that point. The Tecumseh branch was in operation from 1838 until 1851. Adam also served as treasurer of the University of Michigan from 1844 to 1846 and from 1848 to 1851.

Adam died on July 8, 1888, in Tecumseh.

Political offices
Preceded by George W. Germain	Michigan State Treasurer; 1842–1845	Succeeded by George R. Redfield
Preceded by Charles G. Hammond	Michigan Auditor General; 1845–1846	Succeeded by Digby V. Bell
Preceded by Digby V. Bell	Michigan Auditor General; 1848–1850	Succeeded by John Swegles, Jr.
