= George R. Redfield =

American politician

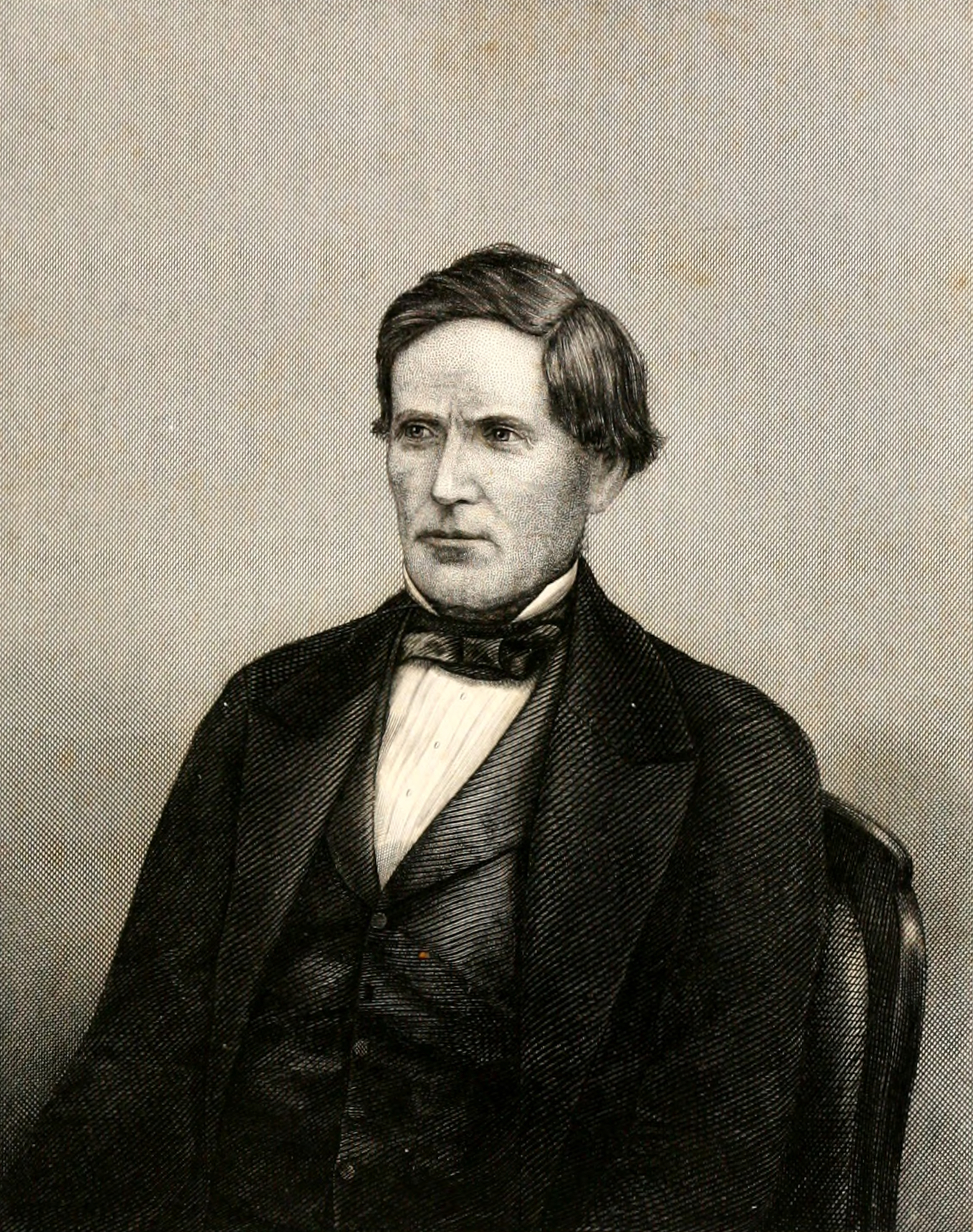

Michigan Secretary of State
- In office 1850 – April 11, 1850
- Governor: John S. Barry
- Preceded by: George Washington Peck
- Succeeded by: Charles H. Taylor

Treasurer of Michigan
- In office 1845–1846
- Preceded by: John J. Adam
- Succeeded by: George B. Cooper

Member of the Michigan Senate from the 5th district
- In office 1842; 1843; 1844

Member of the Michigan House of Representatives from the Cass and Van Buren County district
- In office January 4, 1841 – April 13, 1841

Personal details
- Born: October 6, 1796 Suffield, Connecticut, U.S.
- Died: October 29, 1887 (aged 91) Ontwa Township, Michigan, U.S.
- Party: Democratic
- Spouses: Julia Augusta Mason (m. 1835; d. 1848); Jane E. Hammond (m. 1854)
- Children: 5

George R. Redfield (October 6, 1796 – October 29, 1887) was a Michigan politician.

== Early life ==
George R. Redfield was born in Suffield, Connecticut, on October 6, 1796, to parents Peleg and Mary Polly Redfield. Around 1821, George owned a farm in Clifton Springs, New York. George had this farm leased while he tutored in Georgia from 1822 to 1826.

== Career ==
In 1834, Redfield purchased around 800 acres of land in what is now known as Adamsville, Michigan. Redfield moved to Michigan in 1835. On November 2, 1840, Redfield was elected to the Michigan House of Representatives where he represented the Cass and Van Buren County district from January 4, 1841, to April 13, 1841. On November 1, 1841, Redfield was elected to the Michigan Senate where he represented the 5th district after being sworn in on January 3, 1842. Redfield continued to represent this district until May 12, 1844. In 1844, Redfield served as a presidential elector. Redfield served as Michigan State Treasurer from 1845 to 1846. Redfield served as Michigan Secretary of State in 1850. Redfield resigned from this position on April 11, 1850. Again in 1850, Redfield served as a delegate to the Michigan constitutional convention.

== Personal life ==
On June 9, 1835, Redfield married Julia Augusta Mason. He was widowed upon her death on August 29, 1848. Redfield remarried on September 14, 1854, to Jane E. Hammond. Redfield had three children by his first wife, and two by his second.

== Death ==
Redfield died on October 29, 1887, in Ontwa Township, Michigan.

Political offices
Preceded by John J. Adam	Treasurer of Michigan; 1845–1846	Succeeded by George B. Cooper
Preceded by George Washington Peck	Michigan Secretary of State; 1850–1850	Succeeded by Charles H. Taylor
