= Miller Dunckel =

American politician

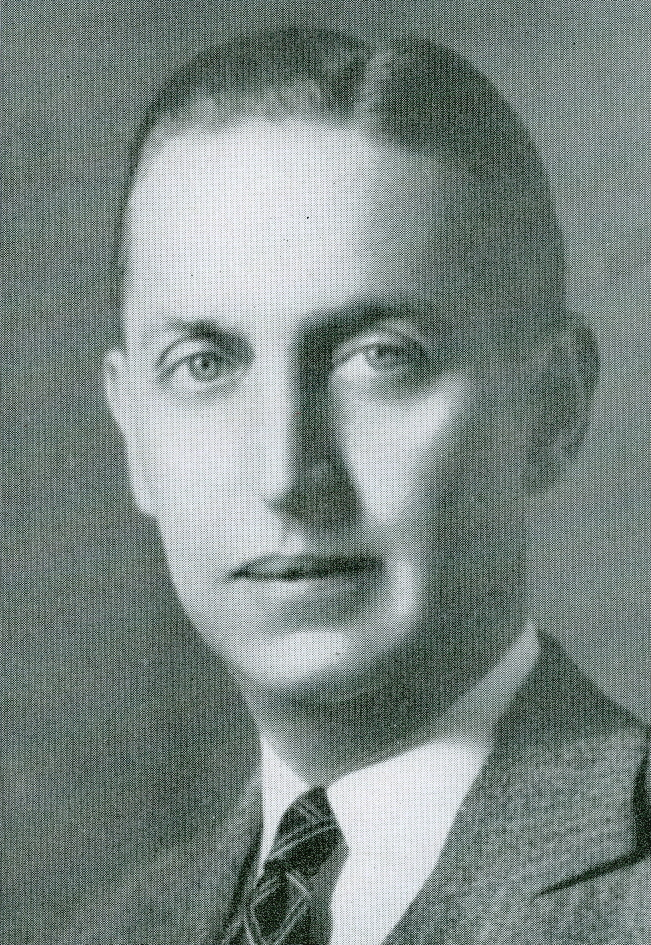

Treasurer of Michigan
- In office 1939–1940
- Preceded by: Theodore I. Fry
- Succeeded by: Theodore I. Fry

Member of the Michigan Senate from the 6th district
- In office January 1, 1935 – December 31, 1938
- Preceded by: James T. Upjohn
- Succeeded by: Carl F. Delano

Personal details
- Born: February 11, 1899 Springfield, Missouri, US
- Died: March 28, 1975 (aged 76) San Diego County, California, US
- Party: Republican

Military service
- Branch/service: United States Army
- Battles/wars: World War I

Luis Miller Dunckel (February 11, 1899 – March 28, 1975) was a Michigan politician.

== Early life ==
Dunckel was born on February 11, 1899, in Springfield, Missouri. He served in the United States Army in World War I.

== Professional career ==
In 1932, Dunckel was defeated in the Republican primary for the Michigan Senate seat representing the 6th district. On November 6, 1934, Dunckel was elected to the Michigan Senate where he represented the 6th district from January 2, 1935, to December 31, 1938. Dunckel served as Michigan State Treasurer from 1939 to 1940. Dunckel was defeated in the 1940 Republican primary for the office of Governor of Michigan.

== Personal life ==
Miller Dunckel was married to Elizabeth T. Dunckel. Dunckel was a part of various groups, such as the Elks, the Freemasons, the American Legion, the Fraternal Order of Eagles, the Loyal Order of Moose, and the Veterans of Foreign Wars.

Dunckel died on March 28, 1975, in San Diego County, California, of pneumonia. Dunckel was interred at Eternal Hills Memorial Park in Oceanside, California.

Political offices
Preceded by Theodore I. Fry	Treasurer of Michigan; 1939–1940	Succeeded by Theodore I. Fry
