= Theodore I. Fry =

Michigan politician

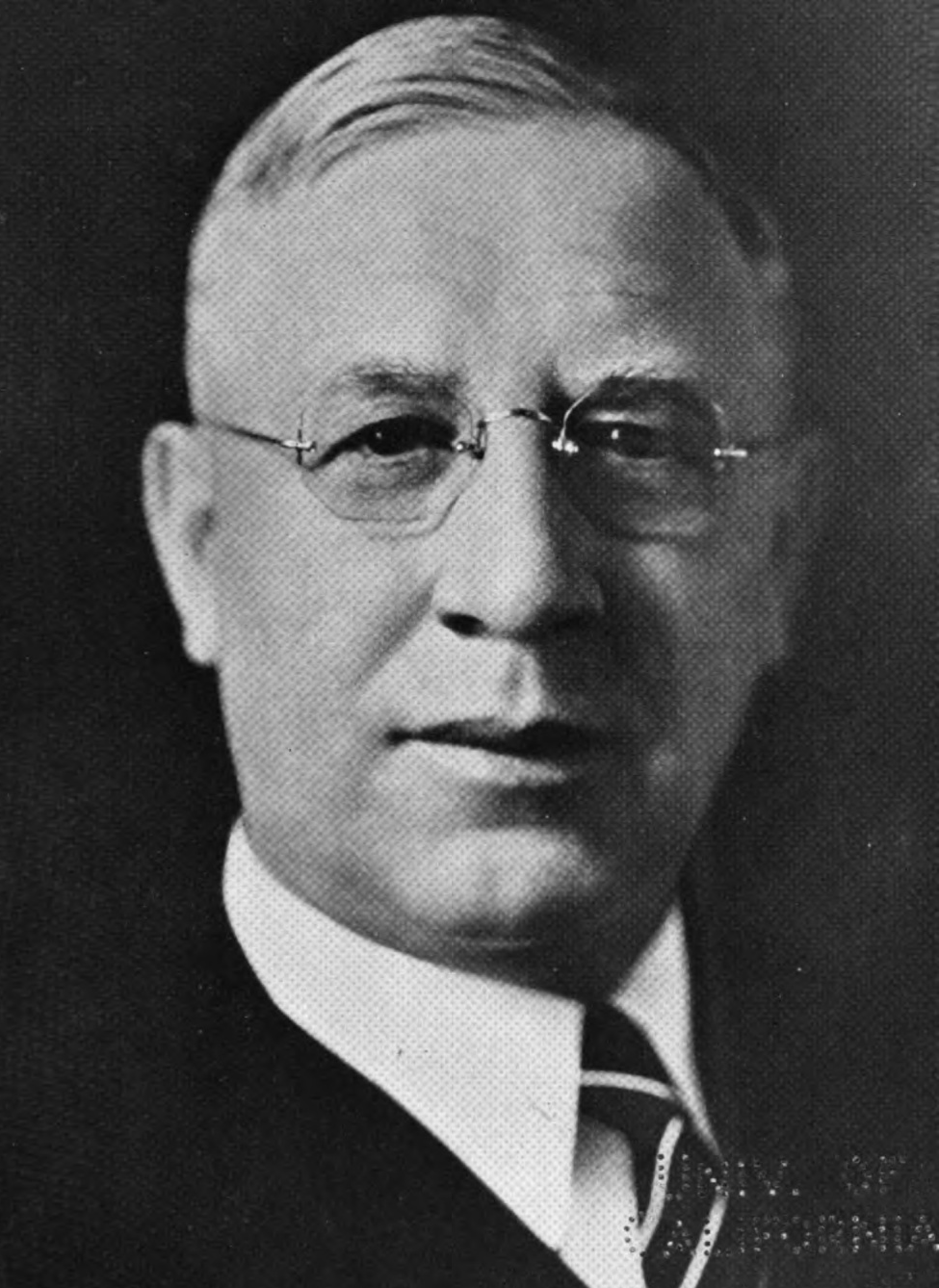

Treasurer of Michigan
- In office 1933–1938
- Governor: William Comstock; Frank Fitzgerald; Frank Murphy
- Preceded by: Howard C. Lawrence
- Succeeded by: Miller Dunckel
- In office 1941–1942
- Governor: Murray Van Wagoner
- Preceded by: Miller Dunckel
- Succeeded by: D. Hale Brake

Personal details
- Born: July 25, 1881 Fremont, Michigan
- Died: January 28, 1962 (aged 80) Fremont, Michigan
- Party: Democratic

Theodore I. Fry (July 25, 1881 – January 28, 1962) was a Michigan politician.

== Early life ==
Fry was born on July 25, 1881, in Fremont, Michigan.

== Career ==
Fry began his career as a teller with the Old Fremont State Bank and was elected Cashier in 1907. At some point, Fry worked as a director for Fremont Canning Company. Fry served as Michigan State Treasurer from 1933 to 1938. Fry was not reelected to this position in 1938. In 1936 and 1940, Fry served as a delegate to Democratic National Convention from Michigan. From 1941 to 1942, Fry once again served as State Treasurer. In 1942, Fry again failed to procure reelection. Fry was a presidential elector in 1944. In 1944 and 1956, Fry served as an alternate delegate to Democratic National Convention from Michigan.

== Personal life ==
Fry was a member of the Freemasons and the Shriners.

== Death ==
Fry died on January 28, 1962, in Gerber Hospital in Fremont.

Political offices
Preceded by Howard C. Lawrence	Treasurer of Michigan; 1933–1938	Succeeded by Miller Dunckel
Preceded by Miller Dunckel	Treasurer of Michigan; 1941–1942	Succeeded by D. Hale Brake
