= Leslie B. Butler =

American politician (1905–1984)

Leslie Brown Butler (12 December 1905 – 14 December 1984) was an American politician from the State of Michigan.

Butler of Lansing, Michigan was Chairman of the Michigan Republican Party from 1940 to 1942.

Party political offices
Preceded by James F. Thomson	Chairman of the Michigan Republican Party; 1940– 1942	Succeeded by John R. Dethmers
