= Robert A. Bowman =

American businessman

Robert A. Bowman served for 17 years as President/CEO of MLB Advanced Media ("MLBAM"). Media reports in late 2017 alleged his departure from the MLBAM resulted from a decade of inappropriate behavior, ranging from multiple consensual intimate relationships with subordinates and leading a "culture of partying and heavy drinking with employees outside the office." MLBAM manages online activities for Major League Baseball including the MLBAM@Bat video streaming applications for Smartphones, pad computing devices and the like. From 1995–2000, he was ITT's President/Chief Operating Officer. From 1991–95, he was also ITT's CFO.

From 1983–90, Bowman was Michigan's State Treasurer and was widely credited with helping fuel the state's economic recovery, including from a 1987 Public Sector Consultants' profile that "Wall Street smiled on Michigan's improved fiscal condition," leading to national notoriety for Bowman. In 2010 it was reported that he was considering a run for governor of Michigan.

== Education ==
Bowman graduated from Harvard College in 1977 and the Wharton School of Business in 1979.

== MLBAM At Bat App ==
Bowman was instrumental in spearheading the development of MLB's At Bat app for the iPhone, iPad, Android, Kindle, etc.

== Bowman Patents ==
Bowman is named as a co-inventor on the following U.S. Patents: U.S. Patent No. 8,121,872: System and Method for Allocating Seats for a Ticketed Event

U.S. Patent No. 8,121,712: System and Method for Determining an Offensive, Defensive, and Cumulative Efficiency of a Sports Team

U.S. Patent No. 8,045,956: System and Method for Venue-to-Venue Messaging

Political offices
Preceded by Loren E. Monroe	Treasurer of Michigan; 1983–1991	Succeeded by Douglas B. Roberts
