= Michigan State Treasurer =

Chief financial officer for the U.S. state of Michigan

Department of Treasury

Department overview
- Formed: July 23, 1965
- Headquarters: Lansing, Michigan
- Annual budget: $490,289,100
- Department executives: Rachael A. Eubanks, State Treasurer; Tom Saxton, Chief Deputy Treasurer
- Key document: Michigan Constitution
- Website: michigan.gov/treasury

State Treasurer of the State of Michigan

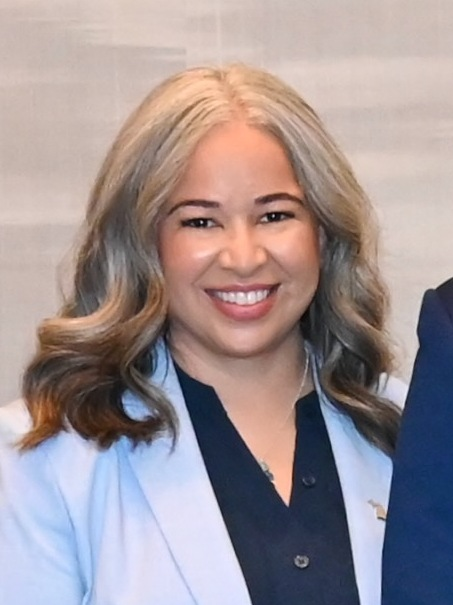
- Incumbent; Rachael A. Eubanks since January 1, 2019
- Michigan Department of Treasury
- Appointer: Governor (Gretchen Whitmer)
- Term length: Governor's pleasure
- Inaugural holder: Henry Howard
- Formation: 1837
- Website: michigan.gov/treasury

The state treasurer of Michigan functions as the chief financial officer for the U.S. state of Michigan. The state treasurer oversees the collection, investment, and disbursement of all state monies, and also administers major tax laws, safeguards the credit of the state, and distributes revenue sharing monies to local units of government. It is an unelected office within the executive branch.

The current state treasurer is Rachael A. Eubanks, who was appointed by Governor Gretchen Whitmer in January 2019.

== Appointment ==
Under the original 1835 Michigan Constitution, the state treasurer was established as an appointed position. State treasurers were appointed by the state legislature. Under the 1850 Michigan Constitution, the state treasurer became an elected position. Elections for the position were held every two years. Under the current 1963 state constitution, the position of state treasurer returned to be an appointed position. State treasurers are now appointed by the governor, with the consent of the state senate.

== List of state treasurers of Michigan ==
| Image | Name | Term | Party / Appointer | Notes | Ref. |
|---|---|---|---|---|---|
| | Henry Howard | 1836–1839 | Michigan Legislature | Resigned | |
| | Peter Desnoyers | 1839–1840 | Stevens T. Mason (Note: Appointed by governor to serve as state treasurer until the legislature appointed a new one.) | | |
| | Robert Stuart | 1840–1841 | Michigan Legislature | Resigned | |
| | George W. Germain | 1841–1842 | James Wright Gordon | | |
| | John J. Adam | 1842–1845 | Michigan Legislature | Resigned | |
| | George R. Redfield | 1845–1846 | John S. Barry | | |
| | George B. Cooper | 1846–1850 | Michigan Legislature | | |
| | Bernard C. Whittemore | 1850–1854 | Democratic (Note: First elected state treasurer.) | | |
| | Silas M. Holmes | 1855–1858 | Republican | | |
| | John McKinney | 1859–1860 | Republican | | |
| | John Owen | 1861–1866 | Republican | | |
| | Ebenezer O. Grosvenor | 1867–1870 | Republican | | |
| | Victory P. Collier | 1871–1874 | Republican | | |
| | William B. McCreery | 1875–1878 | Republican | | |
| | Benjamin D. Pritchard | 1879–1882 | Republican | | |
| | Edward H. Butler | 1883–1886 | Republican | | |
| | George L. Maltz | 1887–1890 | Republican | | |
| | Frederick Braastad | 1891–1892 | Democratic | | |
| | Joseph F. Hambitzer | 1893–1894 | Republican | Removed (Note: Removed from office by the governor.) | |
| | James M. Wilkinson | 1894–1896 | John T. Rich (Note: Initially appointed by governor to fill vacancy, and then elected in the following general election.) | | |
| | James M. Wilkinson | 1894–1896 | Republican | | |
| | George A. Steel | 1897–1900 | Republican | | |
| | Daniel McCoy | 1901–1904 | Republican | | |
| | Frank P. Glazier | 1905–1908 | Republican | Resigned | |
| | John T. Rich | 1908 | Fred M. Warner (Note: Appointed by governor to fill vacancy.) | | |
| | Albert E. Sleeper | 1909–1912 | Republican | | |
| | John W. Haarer | 1913–1916 | Republican | | |
| | Samuel Odell | 1917–1919 | Republican | Resigned | |
| | Frank E. Gorman | 1919–1924 | Albert Sleeper | | |
| | Frank E. Gorman | 1919–1924 | Republican | | |
| | Frank D. McKay | 1925–1930 | Republican | | |
| | Howard C. Lawrence | 1931–1932 | Republican | | |
| | Theodore I. Fry | 1933–1938 | Democratic | | |
| | Miller Dunckel | 1939–1940 | Republican | | |
| | Theodore I. Fry | 1941–1942 | Democratic | | |
| | D. Hale Brake | 1943–1954 | Republican | | |
| | Sanford A. Brown | 1955–1965 | Democratic | | |
| | Allison Green | 1965–1978 | George W. Romney | Resigned | |
| | Loren E. Monroe | 1978–1982 (Note: Nominated and began serving in 1978, formally confirmed in 1979.) | William Milliken | | |
| | Robert A. Bowman | 1983–1991 | James Blanchard | | |
| | Douglas B. Roberts | 1991–1998 | John Engler | Resigned | |
| | Madhu Anderson | 1998–1999 | John Engler | Acting | |
| | Mark A. Murray | 1999–2001 | John Engler | Resigned | |
| | Douglas B. Roberts | 2001–2002 | John Engler | | |
| | Jay B. Rising | 2003–2006 | Jennifer Granholm | Resigned | |
| | Robert J. Kleine | 2006–2010 | Jennifer Granholm | | |
| | Andy Dillon | 2011–2013 | Rick Snyder | Resigned | |
| | R. Kevin Clinton | 2013–2015 | Rick Snyder | Resigned | |
| | Nick Khouri | 2015–2018 | Rick Snyder | | |
| | Rachael A. Eubanks | 2019–present | Gretchen Whitmer | | |
