= Philomena Mantella =

President of Grand Valley State University, Michigan

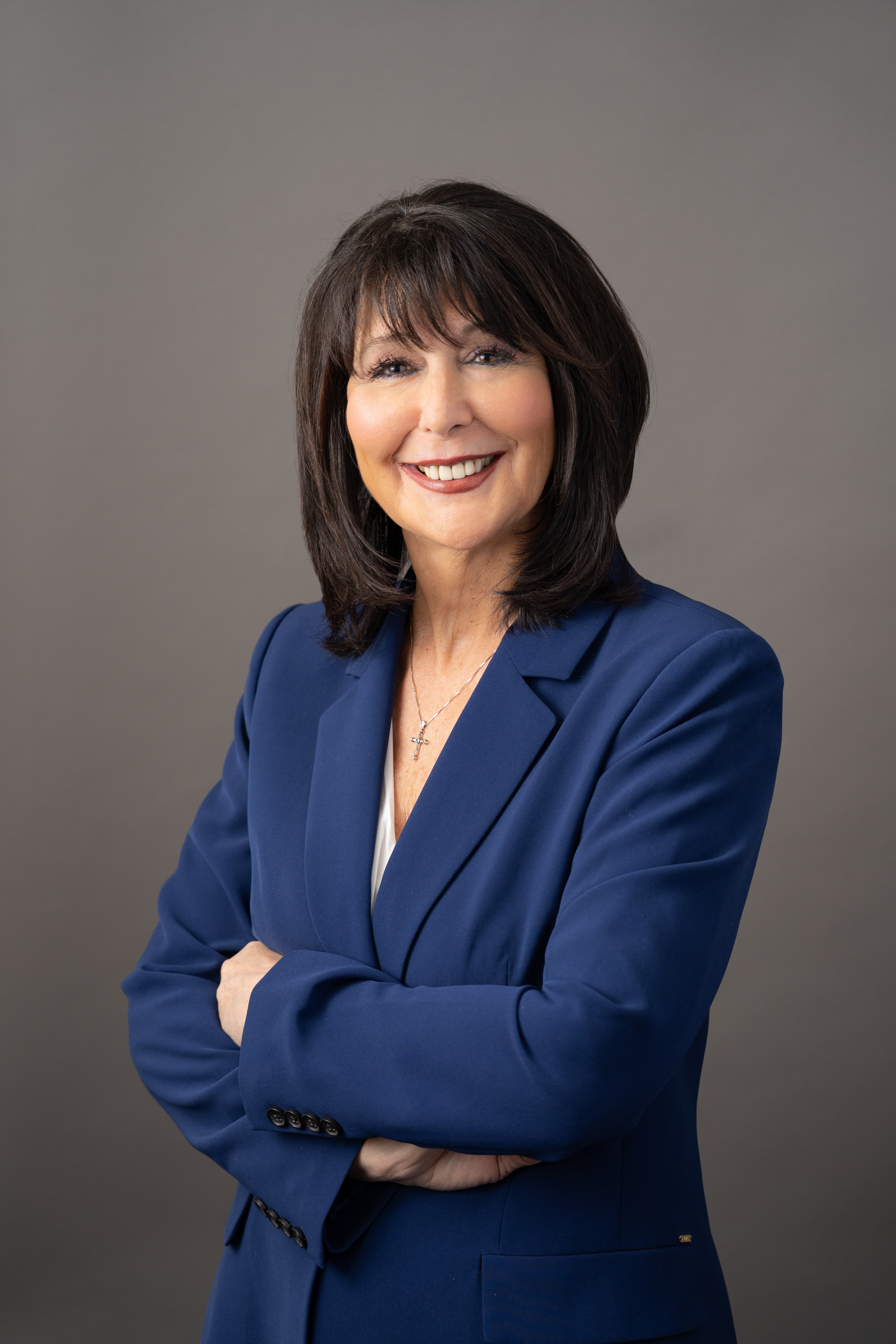
- Philomena V. Mantella
- Born: 1955 (age 70–71)
- Education: Syracuse University; Michigan State University
- Occupation: President of Grand Valley State University
- Predecessor: Thomas J. Haas
- Spouse: Robert Avery

Philomena V. Mantella (born 1955) is the current president of Grand Valley State University, in Allendale, Michigan. On January 22, 2019, she was elected by the Grand Valley State University Board of Trustees to be that institution's fifth president. She is the first woman to serve in the position, succeeding Thomas Haas, who announced his retirement in 2018. Her term began July 1, 2019. On November 4th, 2022, the GVSU Board of Trustees extended her tenure through June 2029. On Friday, April 17th, 2026, the GVSU Board of Trustees extended her contract until July 1, 2031. This renewal came three years before her contract was set to expire.

== Education ==
Mantella earned her Bachelor's and master's degrees in social work from Syracuse University, and her Ph.D. in college and university administration from Michigan State University.

== Career ==
Mantella's background includes broad strategic experience comprised from over 30 years in higher education administration, serving as an officer at many public and private universities throughout New York, New Jersey, Michigan, and Massachusetts.

As Senior Vice President and CEO for the Lifelong Learning Network at Northeastern University in Boston, Mantella was responsible for leading the strategic planning, global market expansion, marketing, new business development, digital platforms, learner experience, and academic programs for serving 18,000 adult learners worldwide. In addition, she led and stewarded the development of Northeastern's global campuses as platforms for all university activity. She also oversaw broad portfolio, at both the undergraduate and graduate levels of enrollment management and student affairs programs in support of the institution's strong student-centered mission and rising position in the market.

From 1985 to 1989, Mantella was the Associate Dean for Enrollment Services at Ferris State University. Thereafter, she served in several vice president positions at Fairleigh Dickinson University, State University of New York College of Optometry, and Pace University before her tenure at Northeastern University began in 2001.

Mantella was approved to be the next president of Grand Valley State University in January 2019 by resolution. Mantella was appointed for a term of five years and will receive the usual and customary benefits associated with the office. Her salary will be $480,000 for the upcoming year. Her predecessor Thomas Haas' salary was $435,660 with an annual deferred annuity of $66,438. On November 4th, 2022, the GVSU Board of Trustees extended her tenure through June 2029.

== Personal life ==
Mantella is married to attorney Robert Avery. They have three grown children and four grandchildren. Mantella and her husband moved to Grand Rapids, Michigan in the Spring of 2019 accompanied by her mother.

Academic offices
Preceded by Thomas J. Haas	President of Grand Valley State University; 2019-	Succeeded by Incumbent
