= Charles H. Taylor (Michigan politician) =

American politician (1813–1889)

Michigan Secretary of State
- In office 1850–1852
- Governor: John S. Barry
- Preceded by: George R. Redfield
- Succeeded by: William Graves

Member of the Michigan House of Representatives from the Kent and Ottawa County district
- In office January 4, 1847 – April 3, 1848

Personal details
- Born: November 20, 1813 Cooperstown, New York, U.S.
- Died: January 9, 1889 (aged 75) Kent County, Michigan, U.S.
- Party: Democratic

Charles Hatch Taylor (November 20, 1813 – January 9, 1889) was an American politician who served as the eighth Secretary of State of Michigan from 1850 to 1852 as a member of the Democratic Party. He previously served in the Michigan House of Representatives from 1847 to 1848.

== Early life ==
Charles H. Taylor was born on November 20, 1813, in Cooperstown, New York, to parents Elisha and Aurelia Taylor. In New York, Charles received an education at an academy. Charles settled in Grand Rapids, Michigan, in 1837.

== Career ==
Taylor served as the clerk of Kent County, Michigan, for eight years. On November 2, 1846, Prosser was elected to the Michigan House of Representatives where he represented the Kent and Ottawa County district from January 4, 1847, to April 3, 1848. Taylor served as one of five commissioners who chose the location of the insane asylum in Kalamazoo, Michigan, and the deaf and dumb asylum in Flint, Michigan. Taylor edited the Grand Rapids Enquirer from 1847 to 1855. Taylor served as Michigan Secretary of State from 1850 to 1852. He was the first secretary of state elected under the 1850 Michigan Constitution. In 1861, Taylor became chief editor of the Detroit Free Press but retired the position due to poor health in 1862.

== Personal life ==
Charles H. Taylor was married to Abigail M. Taylor. Together, they had four children.

Taylor died on January 9, 1889, in Kent County. He lived in Grand Rapids at the time of his death. He was interred at the Fulton Street Cemetery in Grand Rapids.

Political offices
| Preceded by George R. Redfield | Michigan Secretary of State; 1850–1852 | Succeeded by William Graves |
