= Douglas B. Roberts =

American treasurer (born 1947)

Treasurer of Michigan
- In office 2001–2002
- Governor: John Engler
- Preceded by: Mark Murray
- Succeeded by: Jay B. Rising
- In office 1991 – November 20, 1998
- Governor: John Engler
- Preceded by: Robert A. Bowman
- Succeeded by: Mark Murray

Personal details
- Born: October 9, 1947 (age 78) Washington, D.C.
- Education: University of Maryland; Michigan State University

Douglas B. Roberts (born October 9, 1947) served as the Treasurer of Michigan.

== Early life ==
Roberts was born on October 9, 1947, in Washington, D.C.

== Education ==
Roberts graduated from the University of Maryland with honors, studying economics. Roberts then earned his master's and doctorate degrees in the same subject from Michigan State University.

== Career ==
Roberts became the chief aide to the Michigan House Taxation Committee in 1972. He later served as Director of the Michigan Senate Fiscal Agency. Roberts was appointed to the position of Michigan State Treasurer in January 1991. He served in this capacity until November 20, 1998, when he resigned. Chief deputy state treasurer Madhu Anderson became acting State Treasurer in his place. Roberts later served as Michigan State Treasurer from 2001 to 2002.

Political offices
Preceded by Robert A. Bowman	Treasurer of Michigan; 1991–1998	Succeeded by Mark Murray
Preceded by Mark Murray	Treasurer of Michigan; 2001–2002	Succeeded by Jay B. Rising
