= Mark Murray (administrator) =

American businessman (born 1954)

Mark Andrew Murray (born July 5, 1954) is president of the Meijer chain of stores, based in Michigan. He was the third president of Michigan's Grand Valley State University, serving from 2001 to 2006.

== Education ==
Murray graduated from Lansing Catholic Central High School (now Lansing Catholic High School) in 1972. Then he went on to receive his master's degree in Labor and Industrial Relations and his bachelor's degree in Economics from Michigan State University.

== Career ==
Prior to his tenure at Grand Valley, he served in Michigan state government. He acted as the treasurer, budget director, and director of the Department of Management and Budget, as well as the acting director of the Family Independence Agency, the director of the Merit Scholarship Award program, and the Special Policy Advisor to the Governor in K-12 education.

He was also Vice President of Finance and Administration at Michigan State University and a member of the Board of Education in the City of Detroit. During his time as president at GVSU, a number of students believed that he had a strong resemblance with Sam the Eagle, one of Jim Henson's Muppets. His name had been floated as a potential candidate for Governor of Michigan in 2010, but his spokesman denied Murray was interested. In 2013, Murray joined the advisory board of Blackford Capital's Michigan Prosperity Fund.

Political offices
Preceded by Douglas B. Roberts	Treasurer of Michigan; 1999–2001	Succeeded by Douglas B. Roberts
Academic offices
Preceded by Arend D. Lubbers	President of Grand Valley State University; 2001-2006	Succeeded by Thomas J. Haas
