= R. Kevin Clinton =

American treasurer

45th Treasurer of Michigan
- In office November 1, 2013 – 2015
- Governor: Rick Snyder
- Preceded by: Andy Dillon
- Succeeded by: Nick Khouri

Personal details
- Born: Detroit, Michigan
- Education: University of Michigan

R. Kevin Clinton served as the 45th Treasurer of Michigan.

== Early life ==
Clinton was born in Detroit, Michigan.

== Education ==
Clinton earned a B.A. in business administration and an M.A. in actuarial sciences from the University of Michigan.

== Career ==
Clinton has worked in the insurance business, serving as president and CEO of two companies, Americans Physicians Capital Inc. and MEEMIC. Clinton was appointed to the position of Michigan Commissioner of Insurance by Governor Rick Snyder on April 16, 2011, and served in this position until 2013. On November 1, 2013, Clinton was again appointed by Governor Snyder, this time to the position of Treasurer of Michigan on November 1, 2013, and served in this position until his resignation in 2015. Clinton resigned to once again pursue business in the private sector. In 2017, Clinton was named director of the Michigan Catastrophic Claims Association.

Political offices
Preceded by Andy Dillon	Treasurer of Michigan; 2013–2015	Succeeded by Nick Khouri
