= Arend Lubbers =

American academic administrator

Arend Donselaar Lubbers
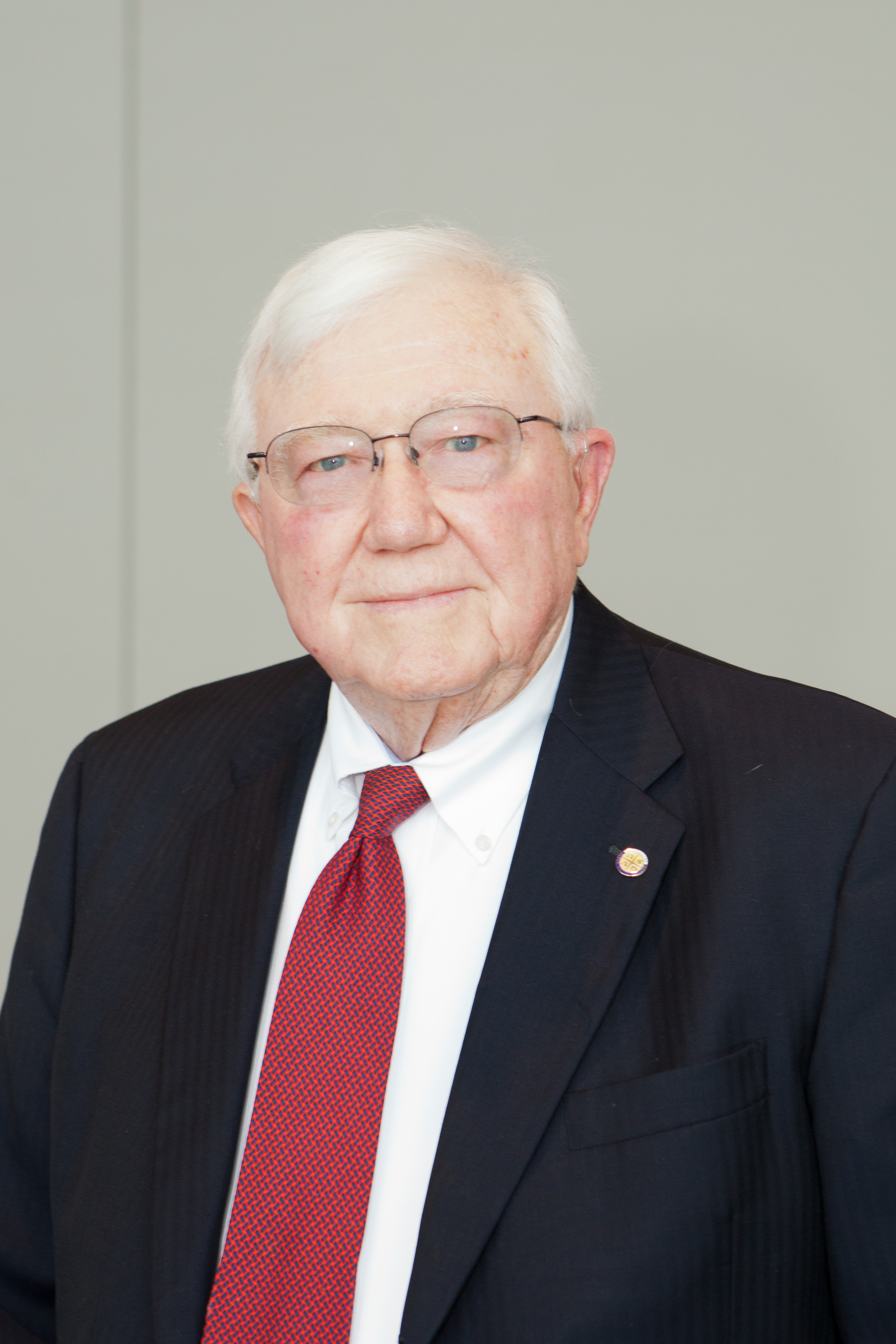
- Lubbers in 2014
- Born: July 23, 1931 (age 94); Milwaukee, Wisconsin, U.S.
- Education: AB, Hope College, 1953; AM, Rutgers University, 1956
- Occupation: College administrator
- Employer(s): 1969-2001, President of Grand Valley State University; 1960-1969, President of Central College (Iowa)
- Board member of: Grand Bank; Macatawa Bank; Hackley Hospital; Olivet College; Pierce Cedar Creek Institute of Environmental Research and Education; Grand Rapids Community Foundation; Porter Hills Foundation; West Michigan Sports Commission
- Spouse(s): m. Eunice L. Mayo, June 19, 1953 (div.) m. Nancy Vanderpol, December 21, 1968
- Children: with Eunice: Arend Donselaar, John Irwin Darrow, Mary Elizabeth with Nancy: Robert Andrew, Caroline Jayne
- Parent(s): Irwin Jacob and Margaret (Van Donselaar) Lubbers
- Awards: Golden Plate Award, 1962; Golden-Emblem Order of Merit, Polish People's Republic, 1988; Trustee's Award for Community Leadership, Aquinas College, 1998; Lifetime Achievement Award, Economic Club of Grand Rapids, 2001 named 1 of top 100 young men in U.S., Life (magazine), 1962. LittD, Central College, 1977; DSc, University of Sarajevo, Yugoslavia, 1987; LHD, Hope College, 1988; DSc, Akademia Ekonomiczna, Krakow, Poland, 1989; DSc, University of Kingston, England, 1995; LittD, Grand Valley State University; LittD, Olivet College, 2008. Arts Building at Central College named after Lubbers and his father

Arend Donselaar "Don" Lubbers (born July 23, 1931) was president of Grand Valley State University (and predecessor Grand Valley State College) from 1969 to 2001. He was the second president of Grand Valley, serving after James Zumberge and before Mark Murray. He currently holds the title of President Emeritus. Most of the university's growth came during his tenure.

== Early life ==
Lubbers graduated from Hope College, where his father Irwin Lubbers was president, and received his master's degree from Rutgers University in 1956.

He taught at Wittenberg University .

He served as president of Central College in Pella, Iowa, until he became Grand Valley's president.

== Grand Valley State University ==
Lubbers became president of what was then Grand Valley State College at the age of 37, making him one of the nation's youngest university presidents.

The university expanded from a small cluster of colleges to Michigan's fastest growing university.

Lubbers Stadium on the Allendale Campus is named for him.

When he retired in 2001, Lubbers was the longest serving state university leader in the country.

Academic offices
Preceded by James Zumberge	President of Grand Valley State University; 1969-2001	Succeeded by Mark Murray
