= Howard C. Lawrence =

American politician

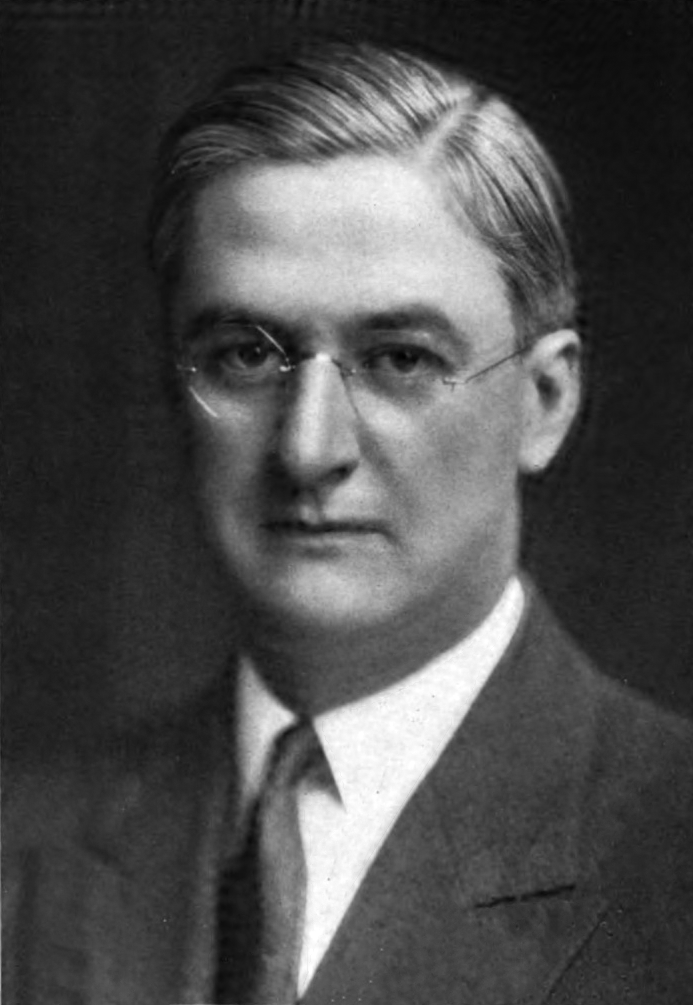
- Portrait, c. 1932

30th Treasurer of Michigan
- In office 1931–1932
- Governor: Wilber M. Brucker
- Preceded by: Frank D. McKay
- Succeeded by: Theodore I. Fry

Chair of the Michigan Republican Party
- In office 1929–1937
- Preceded by: Gerrit J. Diekema
- Succeeded by: James F. Thomson

Personal details
- Born: Howard Cyrus Lawrence; August 14, 1890 Sebewa Township, Michigan, United States
- Died: May 20, 1961 (aged 70)
- Party: Republican
- Spouse: Clara Louise Luther (m. 1913)
- Occupation: Banker; businessman; politician

Howard Cyrus Lawrence (August 14, 1890 – May 20, 1961) was an American politician from the U.S. state of Michigan.

== Biography ==
Lawrence was born in Sebewa Township, Michigan in Ionia County, the son of Cyrus S. Lawrence and Margaret (Neidhardt) Lawrence. He resided in Ionia, Saginaw and Grand Rapids. Lawrence married Clara Louise Luther on May 1, 1913.

Lawrence was a banker and a business partner and executive secretary to Governor of Michigan, Fred W. Green. He was Chairman of the Michigan Republican Party from 1929 to 1937. He also served as State Treasurer of Michigan, 1931–32 and was defeated in 1932 for re-election. He was a delegate (alternate) from Michigan to the 1936 Republican National Convention which nominated Alf Landon for U.S. President, and the 1940 convention which nominated Wendell Willkie, both of whom lost to Franklin D. Roosevelt.

He was a Protestant and a member of the Freemasons, Elks and Rotary.

Party political offices
Preceded by Gerrit J. Diekema	Chairman of the Michigan Republican Party; 1929– 1937	Succeeded by James F. Thomson
Political offices
Preceded by Frank D. McKay	Treasurer of Michigan; 1931–1932	Succeeded by Theodore I. Fry
