= Robert Kleine =

American treasurer

Robert J. Kleine was the 43rd State Treasurer of Michigan, serving from 2006 to 2010. He was appointed to his position effective April 9, 2006, by Governor Jennifer M. Granholm.

He is treasurer of the Michigan League for Public Policy.

Political offices
Preceded by Jay B. Rising	Treasurer of Michigan; 2006–2010	Succeeded by Andy Dillon
