= Andy Dillon =

American politician (born 1962)

44th State Treasurer of Michigan
- In office January 1, 2011 – October 11, 2013
- Governor: Rick Snyder
- Preceded by: Robert Kleine
- Succeeded by: R. Kevin Clinton

70th Speaker of the Michigan House of Representatives
- In office January 1, 2007 – December 31, 2010
- Governor: Jennifer Granholm
- Preceded by: Craig DeRoche
- Succeeded by: Jase Bolger

Member of the Michigan House of Representatives from the 17th district
- In office November 9, 2004 – December 31, 2010
- Preceded by: Daniel S. Paletko
- Succeeded by: Phil Cavanagh

Personal details
- Born: 1962 (age 63–64)
- Party: Democratic

Andrew Dillon is a Democratic Party politician from the U.S. state of Michigan. While Dillon is a Democrat, he was appointed by Governor Rick Snyder, a Republican, to be the state's treasurer. Before serving in the Cabinet, Dillon was speaker of the Michigan House of Representatives.

In the House, he represented a constituency in Wayne County that included Redford Township, the northern portion of Dearborn Heights, and the eastern portion of Livonia. He had served from 2007 to 2011.

== Early life ==
Dillon graduated from Detroit Catholic Central High School in 1980, where he participated in the cross-country team. Dillon attended Detroit College of Law and then transferred to, and graduated from the University of Notre Dame with degrees in accounting and law. Dillon ran a law practice in Wayne County before becoming president of DSC Ltd. in 1995, and also served as a District Court magistrate and an aide to former U.S. Senator Bill Bradley (D-New Jersey).

== Political career ==
Dillon was first elected to the Michigan House of Representatives in 2004 in a special election. He was re-elected in 2006, and his Democratic colleagues chose him to be the 70th Speaker of the Michigan House after securing the majority from the Republicans. He survived a recall election and was re-elected in 2008.

== Gubernatorial race ==
On February 28, 2010, Dillon announced that he would run for governor of Michigan in 2010, a position being vacated by term-limited Democratic Governor Jennifer Granholm. He lost the Democratic nomination to Virgil Bernero.

== State Treasurer ==
Dillon was appointed by Governor Snyder to be the Michigan State Treasurer and took office in 2011. On October 11, 2013, Dillon resigned, citing his desire to protect his family from media attention and scrutiny related to his divorce proceedings. He became a temporary senior adviser to his successor, R. Kevin Clinton, and continued to receive the same salary he had as treasurer, $174,204 annually.

| Preceded by Craig M. DeRoche | Speaker of the Michigan House of Representatives; 2007-2010 | Succeeded by Jase Bolger |
| Preceded by Robert J. Kleine | State Treasurer of Michigan; 2011-2013 | Succeeded by R. Kevin Clinton |
