= John Swegles Jr. =

American politician

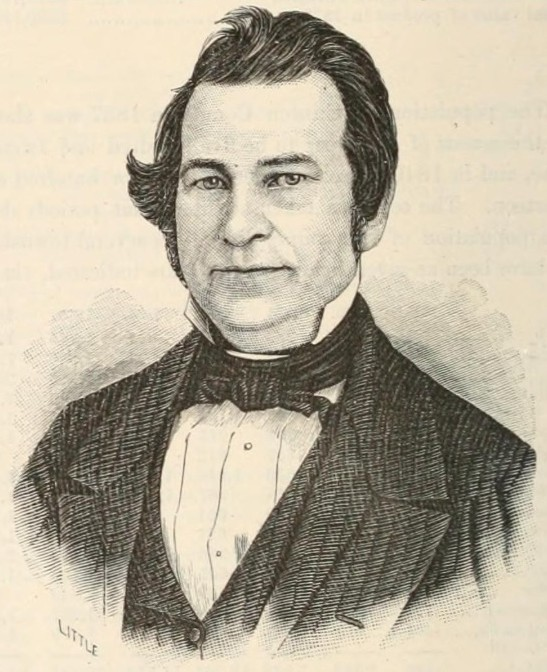

Michigan Auditor General
- In office 1851–1854
- Governor: John S. Barry; Robert McClelland; Andrew Parsons
- Preceded by: John J. Adam
- Succeeded by: Whitney Jones

Personal details
- Born: April 15, 1819 Hector, New York, US
- Died: December 17, 1861 (aged 42) St. Johns, Michigan, US

John Swegles Jr. (April 15, 1819 – December 17, 1861) was a Michigan politician.

== Early life ==
Swegles was born on April 15, 1819, in Hector, New York. At the age of eighteen, he began to study medicine. Swegles left his studies to sign on as a purser's clerk on the Porpoise during a survey of the Atlantic Coast.

== Career ==
Swegles moved to Jonesville, Michigan in 1840. He served as county clerk for Hillsdale County from 1845 to 1849. Swegles then served as Michigan Auditor General from 1851 to 1854. He was the founder of St. Johns, Michigan.

== Personal life ==
Swegles was the father-in-law of Oliver L. Spaulding.

== Death ==
Swegles died in St. Johns, Michigan, on December 17, 1861. He was interred at Mount Rest Cemetery in St. Johns.
