= John McKinney (Michigan politician) =

American politician

Treasurer of Michigan
- In office 1859–1860
- Governor: Moses Wisner
- Preceded by: Silas M. Holmes
- Succeeded by: John Owen

Michigan Secretary of State
- In office 1855–1858
- Governor: Kinsley S. Bingham
- Preceded by: William Graves
- Succeeded by: Nelson G. Isbell

Member of the Michigan Senate from the 4th district
- In office January 1, 1849 – April 2, 1849
- In office January 7, 1850 – April 21, 1850

Member of the Michigan House of Representatives from the Van Buren County district
- In office January 3, 1848 – April 3, 1848

Personal details
- Born: 1803 Pennsylvania
- Died: July 10, 1870 (aged 66-67) Van Buren County, Michigan
- Party: Democratic (before 1854); Republican (after 1854)

John McKinney (1803 – July 10, 1870) was a Michigan politician.

== Early life ==
McKinney was born on 1803 in Pennsylvania. McKinney moved to Michigan in 1837, where he settled in Van Buren County.

== Career ==
On November 1, 1847, McKinney was elected to the Michigan House of Representatives where he represented the Van Buren County district from January 3, 1848, to April 3, 1848. On November 6, 1848, McKinney was elected to the Michigan Senate where he represented the 4th district from January 1, 1849, to April 2, 1849. On November 5, 1849, McKinney was elected to another term in the Michigan Senate where he again represented the 4th district from January 7, 1850, to April 21, 1850. McKinney was a Democrat before 1854, but afterwards, McKinney was a Republican. McKinney served as Michigan Secretary of State from 1855 to 1858. McKinney served as Michigan State Treasurer from 1859 to 1860.

== Death ==
McKinney died in Van Buren County on July 10, 1870.

Political offices
Preceded by William Graves	Michigan Secretary of State; 1855–1858	Succeeded by Nelson G. Isbell
Preceded by Silas M. Holmes	Treasurer of Michigan; 1859–1860	Succeeded by John Owen
