= Michigan Republican Party =

Michigan affiliate of the Republican Party

- Chairperson: Jim Runestad
- Senate Leader: Aric Nesbitt
- House Leader: Matt Hall
- Founded: July 6, 1854; 172 years ago, in Jackson, Michigan
- Headquarters: Lansing, Michigan
- Student wing: Michigan Federation of College Republicans
- Youth wing: Michigan Young Republicans; Michigan Teen Age Republicans
- Women's wing: Republican Women's Federation of Michigan
- Ideology: Conservatism
- National affiliation: Republican Party
- Colors: Red
- Michigan House of Representatives: 58 / 110
- Michigan Senate: 18 / 38
- Statewide executive offices: 0 / 4
- U.S. House of Representatives: 7 / 13
- U.S. Senate: 0 / 2

Election symbol

Website
- Official website

The Michigan Republican Party is the state affiliate of the national Republican Party in Michigan, United States, sometimes referred to as MIGOP.

Ronna Romney McDaniel was the chairwoman of the party, having been elected in 2015 by delegates to the Republican State Convention. In 2017, McDaniel became Republican National Committee Chairwoman, serving until 2024. The Michigan Republican Party hosts a biennial political conference at the Mackinac Island Grand Hotel called the Mackinac Republican Leadership Conference. The event features notable national Republicans, senators, governors, and presidential candidates.

Even though the Michigan Republican Party has historically been characterized by conservatism, the party took a hard-right turn after Donald Trump won the presidency in 2016. After the 2020 United States elections, the Michigan Republican Party pushed false claims of fraud and sought to overturn the election results. A months-long Republican investigation found there was no evidence of widespread fraud and recommended for the attorney general to investigate some who had made such allegations for personal gain.

== History ==
Republicans have been elected to the governorship of Michigan in 27 of 48 gubernatorial elections. The first was Kingsley S. Bingham in 1855, and the most recent is Rick Snyder, who was elected in 2010, and then re-elected in 2014.

After President Richard Nixon resigned due to the Watergate scandal, Vice President Gerald Ford became the 38th President of the United States. Ford grew up in Grand Rapids and served as a U.S. Representative from Michigan from 1949 to 1973.

Following the 2016 election and Reince Priebus' selection to be White House Chief of Staff, Michigan Republican Party Chairman Ronna Romney McDaniel became Chairwoman of the Republican National Committee. Then-President-elect Trump recommended McDaniel in December 2016 to replace Priebus. She was officially elected as RNC chair on January 19, 2017, becoming the second woman to hold the post in RNC history, after Mary Louise Smith.

After Joe Biden won the 2020 presidential election in Michigan and Donald Trump refused to concede, the Michigan Republican Party pushed false claims of fraud and sought to overturn the election results. In January 2021, the Michigan Republican Party sought to replace GOP member Aaron Van Langevelde on the Michigan Board of Canvassers; he had previously voted to certify the Michigan election results in favor of Biden. One of the candidates that the Michigan Republican Party sought to nominate to that position was Linda Lee Tarver, who had been involved in efforts to overturn the election results.

According to the Associated Press, since Trump's defeat in the 2020 presidential election and Michigan swinging back to the Democrats, the Michigan GOP have taken a hard right-wing turn. The shift has altered the once moderate character of the state GOP and has instead embraced more right-wing elements. In 2021, the executive director of the Michigan GOP resigned after he declined to say that the 2020 election was stolen from Donald Trump; delegates in the Michigan GOP had called for him to be fired for his remarks. Increasing internal divisions within the Michigan Republican Party led to a violent physical brawl at a state committee meeting in 2023, during which one party activist allegedly kicked a committee member in the groin and broke his rib.

== Current elected Republicans in Michigan ==
President Gerald Ford (1974–1977)

=== Members of Congress ===
==== U.S. Senate ====
- None

Both of Michigan's U.S. Senate seats have been held by Democrats since 2001. Spencer Abraham was the last Republican to represent Michigan in the U.S. Senate. First elected in 1994, Abraham lost re-election in 2000 to Democrat Debbie Stabenow.

==== U.S. House of Representatives ====
Out of the 13 seats Michigan is apportioned in the U.S. House of Representatives, 7 are held by Republicans:

District	Member	Photo
1st	Jack Bergman	
2nd	John Moolenaar	
4th	Bill Huizenga	
5th	Tim Walberg	
7th	Tom Barrett	
9th	Lisa McClain	
10th	John James	

=== Statewide ===
- None

Michigan has not elected any GOP candidates to statewide office since 2014, when Rick Snyder, Brian Calley, Bill Schuette, and Ruth Johnson were re-elected as governor, lieutenant governor, attorney general, and secretary of state, respectively. In 2018, term limits prevented all four politicians from seeking third terms. Schuette ran as the Republican nominee in the 2018 gubernatorial election with Lisa Posthumus Lyons as his running mate and was subsequently defeated by Democratic challenger Gretchen Whitmer and running mate Garlin Gilchrist while Tom Leonard and Mary Treder Lang ran as the Republican nominees for Attorney General and Secretary of State and were subsequently defeated by Democratic challengers Dana Nessel and Jocelyn Benson.

=== Michigan Legislature ===
- Senate Minority Leader: Aric Nesbitt
- Majority Leader of the Michigan House of Representatives: Bryan Posthumus
- Speaker of the Michigan House of Representatives: Matt Hall

== United States cabinet members from Michigan who served under a Republican president ==
The following are in order of presidential succession.

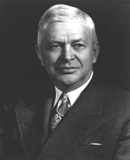
Charles Wilson, nicknamed "Engine Charlie", was formerly CEO of GM.

Name	Cabinet position	Years served	President(s) served under
Charles Erwin Wilson	Secretary of Defense	1953–1957	Dwight D. Eisenhower
Zachariah Chandler	Secretary of the Interior	1875–1877	Ulysses S. Grant
Roy D. Chapin	Secretary of Commerce	1932–1933	Herbert Hoover
Frederick H. Mueller	Secretary of Commerce	1959–1961	Dwight D. Eisenhower
George W. Romney	Secretary of Housing and Urban Development	1969–1973	Richard Nixon
David Stockman	Director of Office of Management and Budget	1981–1985	Ronald Reagan
Spencer Abraham	Secretary of Energy	2001–2005	George W. Bush
Betsy DeVos	Secretary of Education	2017–2021	Donald Trump
Russell A. Alger	Secretary of War (obsolete)	1897–1899	William McKinley
Truman Handy Newberry	Secretary of the Navy (obsolete)	1908–1909	Theodore Roosevelt
Edwin Denby	Secretary of the Navy (obsolete)	1921–1924	Warren G. Harding
Edwin Denby	Secretary of the Navy (obsolete)	1921–1924	Calvin Coolidge
Arthur Summerfield	Postmaster General (obsolete)	1953–1961	Dwight D. Eisenhower
Ben Carson	Secretary of Housing & Urban Development	2017–2021	Donald Trump

== Michigan Republican State Committee ==
The Michigan Republican State Committee is the state central committee of the Michigan Republican Party. It is composed of seven members from each of Michigan's Congressional district Republican committees, the Chairman, Co-Chairman, the various Vice Chairmen of the Party, and the Secretary, Treasurer and General and Financial Counsels. It selects Michigan's two representatives to the Republican National Committee. Additionally, the Chairperson of each County Republican Party organization is a non-voting ex officio member of the State Committee.

=== Current leadership ===
Position	Name
Chair	Jim Runestad
Co-Chair	Sunny Reddy
Treasurer	Ben Genser
Grassroots Vice-Chair	Chris Long
Administrative Vice-Chair	Cheryl Constantino
Coalitions Vice-Chair	Susan Kokinda
Outreach Vice-Chair	Rola Makki
Ethnic Vice-Chair	Michael Farage
Youth Vice-Chair	Krish Mathrani
National Committeewoman	Hima Kolanagireddy
National Committeeman	Dr. Rob Steele

=== Chairmen of the Michigan Republican State Committee ===
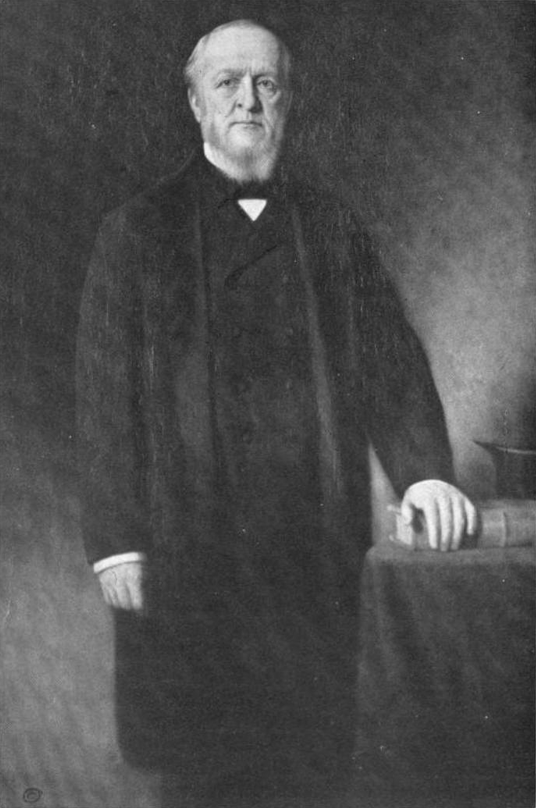
Henry P. Baldwin is the only former governor to become party chairman; Bagley and Groesbeck had not yet been governor.

Name	Residence	Years served
Joseph Warren	Detroit	1854–1855
James M. Edmunds	Detroit	1855–1861
E. C. Walker	Detroit	1861–1862
William Alanson Howard	Detroit	1862–1868
Governor John J. Bagley	Detroit	1868–1870
Stephen D. Bingham	Lansing	1870–1878
George H. Hopkins	Detroit	1878
Zachariah Chandler	Detroit	1878–1879
James McMillan	Detroit	1879–1880
Governor Henry P. Baldwin	Detroit	1880–1882
Edward S. Lacey	Charlotte	1882–1884
Philip T. Van Zile	Charlotte	1884–1886
James McMillan	Detroit	1886–1888
George H. Hopkins	Detroit	1888–1890
James McMillan	Detroit	1890–1896
Dexter M. Ferry	Detroit	1896–1898
Arthur Marsh	Allegan	1898–1900
Gerrit J. Diekema	Holland	1900–1910
Frank Knox	Sault Ste. Marie	1910–1912
Governor Alex J. Groesbeck	Detroit	1912–1914
Gilman M. Dame	Northport	1914–1916
John D. Mangum	Marquette	1916–1918
Burt D. Cady	Port Huron	1919–1925
Kennedy L. Potter	Jackson	1925–1927
Gerrit J. Diekema	Holland	1927–1929
Howard C. Lawrence	Ionia and Saginaw	1929–1937
James Francis Thomson	Jackson	1937–1940
Leslie B. Butler	Lansing	1940–1942
John R. Dethmers	Holland	1942–1945
John A. Wagner	Battle Creek	1945–1949
Owen Cleary	Ypsilanti	1949–1953
John Feikens	Detroit	1953–1957
Lawrence Lindemer	Stockbridge	1957–1961
George Van Peursem	Zeeland	1961–1963
Arthur G. Elliott Jr.	Birmingham	1963–1965
Elly M. Peterson	Charlotte	1965–1969
William F. McLaughlin	Northville	1969–1979
Melvin L. Larson	Oxford	1979–1983
Spencer Abraham	East Lansing	1983–1991
David J. Doyle	Okemos	1991–1995
Susy Heintz (Avery)	Clinton Township	1995–1996
Betsy DeVos	Grand Rapids	1996–2000
Gerald Hills	East Lansing	2000–2003
Betsy DeVos	Grand Rapids	2003–2005
Saul Anuzis	Lansing	2005–2009
Ronald Weiser	Ann Arbor	2009–2011
Bobby Schostak	Oakland County	2011–2015
Ronna Romney McDaniel	Northville	2015–2017
Ronald Weiser	Ann Arbor	2017–2019
Laura Cox	Livonia	2019–2021
Ronald Weiser	Ann Arbor	2021–2023
Kristina Karamo	Detroit	2023–2024
Malinda Pego (acting)	Muskegon	2024
Pete Hoekstra	Holland	2024–2025
Jim Runestad	White Lake	2025–present
