= Julianne Vanden Wyngaard =

American carillonist

Julianne Vanden Wyngaard is a professional carillonist and pianist residing in Grand Rapids, Michigan. She served as vice president of The Guild of Carillonneurs in North America (GCNA), as well as president from 2017 to 2019. In a predominantly male and white field, Vanden Wyngaard has distinguished herself through musical and professional accolades.

== Education ==
As an undergraduate, Vanden Wyngaard studied piano at the Eastman School of Music. She continued to receive her BFA at the University of Wisconsin–Milwaukee and then participated in graduate work at Michigan State University. Most recently in 2000, Vanden Wyngaard received a diploma from the Netherlands Carillon School.

== Professional ==
In 1965 Vanden Wyngaard joined the Grand Valley State University (GVSU) faculty, where she was featured as a piano soloist and professor. She vital in the creation of the carillon program at GVSU, which now has two of the fourteen carillon towers in Michigan. When asked about her career, she said, "My biggest accomplishment was bringing the carillon to the west Michigan community."
