= State University of New York at Cobleskill =

Public college in Cobleskill, New York, US

Coordinates: 42°40′23″N 74°29′54″W

- Former names: Schoharie State School of Agriculture (1911–1927); New York State School of Agriculture at Cobleskill (1927–1941); New York State Institute of Applied Arts and Sciences at Cobleskill (1941–1962); State University of New York Agricultural and Technical College at Cobleskill (1962–1987)
- Motto: Real life, real learning
- Type: Public college
- Established: 1911; 115 years ago
- Parent institution: State University of New York
- Endowment: $9.56 million (2025)
- President: Marion Terenzio
- Undergraduates: 1,824 (fall 2025)
- Location: Cobleskill, New York, U.S.
- Campus: 902 acres (365 ha)
- Colors: Orange and black
- Nickname: Fighting Tigers
- Sporting affiliations: NCAA Division III
- Mascot: Coby T. Tiger
- Website: www.cobleskill.edu

The State University of New York College of Agriculture and Technology at Cobleskill (SUNY Cobleskill) is a public college in Cobleskill, New York, United States. It is part of the State University of New York (SUNY) system. It began as the Schoharie State School of Agriculture in 1911 and joined the SUNY system in 1916. SUNY Cobleskill is accredited by the Middle States Commission on Higher Education and the New York State Education Department registers all academic programs.

== History ==
The university was initially chartered in 1911 and opened five years later in 1916 as the Schoharie State School of Agriculture. Sixteen years later in 1927, state law changed the name to the New York State School of Agriculture at Cobleskill.

The name continued to change as the school's mission and size evolved, becoming the New York State Institute of Applied Arts and Sciences at Cobleskill in 1941 and then the State University of New York Agricultural and Technical College at Cobleskill in 1962.

The school adopted the name State University of New York College of Agriculture and Technology at Cobleskill, in 1987 after earning the right to grant bachelors degrees for the first time.

SUNY Cobleskill boasts 8 national titles in dairy judging in the Post Secondary Division of the Dairy Judging National Championship held at the World Dairy Expo in Madison, Wisconsin. The school also has claim to two 2nd place finishes in the Dairy Challenge competition in 2019 and 2017.

== Campus facilities ==
Undergraduate demographics as of Fall 2023
Race and ethnicity	Total
White	69%
Hispanic	14%
Black	9%
Two or more races	3%
Unknown	3%
Asian	2%
International student	1%
Economic diversity
Low-income (Note: The percentage of students who received an income-based federal Pell grant intended for low-income students.)	43%
Affluent (Note: The percentage of students who are a part of the American middle class at the bare minimum.)	57%

=== Residence halls ===
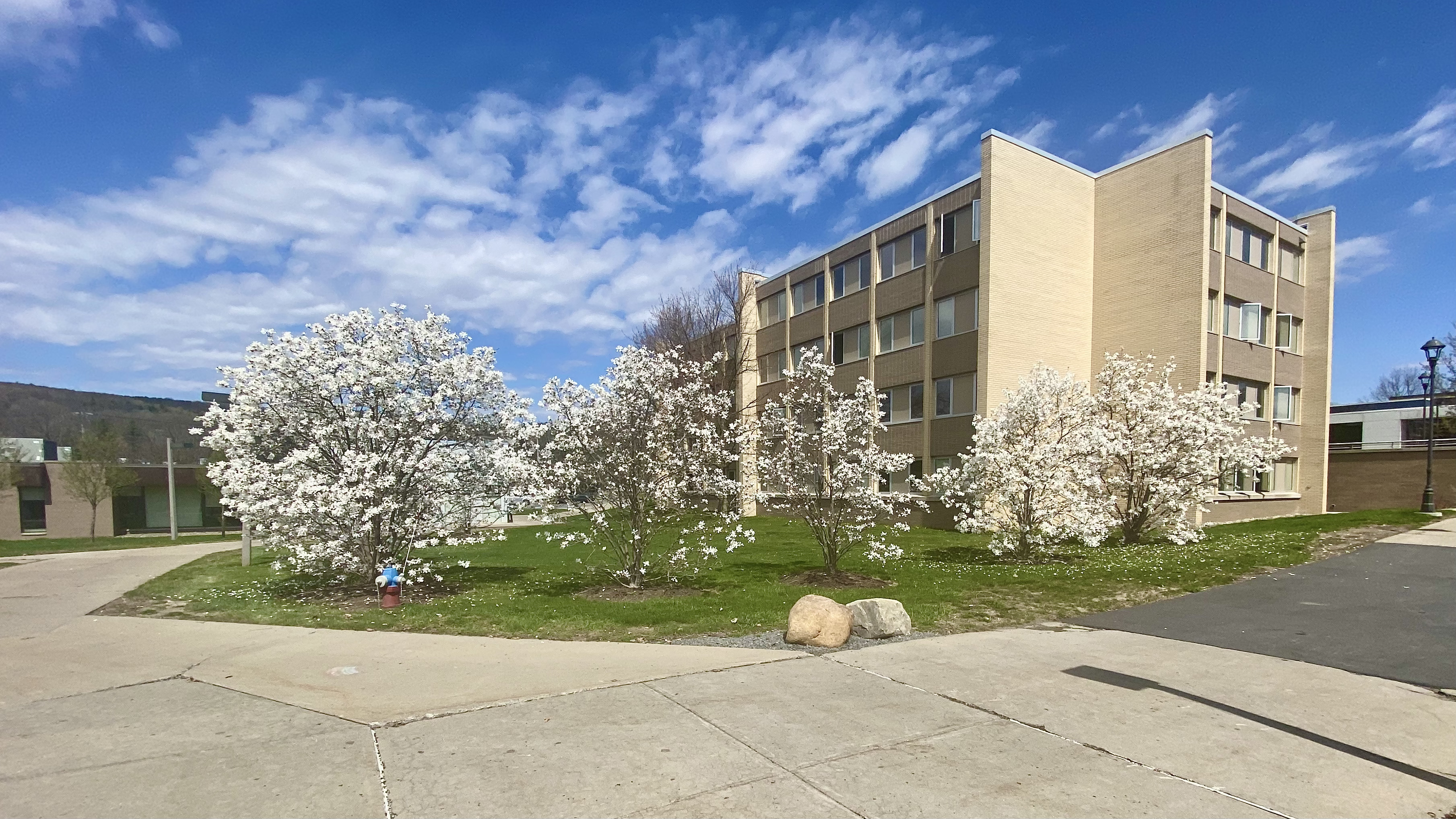
Dix Hall (right) and the Wellness Center (left)

SUNY Cobleskill has 10 residence halls for full-time students. All student rooms are wired for cable television and wireless internet access.

First Year Experience — Only first-year students.

- Fake Hall
- Parsons Hall
- Ten Eyck Hall
- Davis Hall

Cobleskill Traditional — Permitting all students regardless of year.

- Dix Hall
- Draper Hall
- Pearson Hall

Upper Class Living/Learning — Permitting any student with 60 or more credits completed.

- Vroman Hall

Single Gender — Segregating the residents by wing; one is female, the other is male. Each wing has one or two common, single gender bathrooms.

- Wieting Hall

Suite style and townhouse living — Students each live in their own room and share a living space, kitchen and bathroom with other students in their suite or town home. Suites have four rooms per living area and townhouses have six and are also equipped with a washer and dryer.

- Alumni Commons

=== Academic buildings ===
The academic buildings are spread out across the campus. The major buildings include:

- The Old Quad complex, located on the original college site, includes: Frisbie, Home Economics, Old Gym, and Alumni Halls.
- The Agricultural complex, including: Curtis Mott (Ag Eng), Center for Agriculture and Natural Resources CANR (houses plant science, animal science and wildlife classes/labs), Livestock facilities, Dairy Barn, Equestrian Center, Fish Hatchery, Greenhouses, Horse Barn, Livestock Building, Meat Processing Lab, and the Nursery.
- Warner: The Business and Computer technologies building.
- Wheeler: The Liberal Arts and Sciences building.
- Champlin and Prentice Halls: Culinary Arts, Hospitality & Tourism buildings,
- Holmes Hall: the Early Childhood building.
- The Childcare Center
- Van Wagenen Library

=== Dining facilities ===
Dining services are run by Cobleskill Auxiliary Services (CAS). With their ID card, students may use their meal plan, a CobyCash account, or opt to pay in cash.

=== Athletic facilities ===
- Equestrian facilities
- Baseball field
- Bouck Pool – permanently closed since 2023
- Running track
- Soccer field
- Softball field
- Fitness Center
- Tennis courts
- The Fieldhouse
- The Iorio Gymnasium

=== Other facilities ===
- Bouck Hall: the Student Activities Building, which is home to the Iorio Gymnasium, the fitness center, the Bouck Auditorium, the defunct campus bowling alley, the Bouck swimming pool, the college store, the mail room, the Student Life Center, Twisted Whiskers sandwich shop, the Commuter Lounge, and the Bouck Ballroom.
- Johnson Hall: home to University Police.
- Knapp Hall: the Administration Building; home to the Career Development Center, Residential Life, Student Accounts, Admissions, Financial Aid, the Registrar's office, and telecommunications.
- The Wellness Center offers both medical support and counseling.
- Brickyard Point: houses Brickyard Brewhouse on the upper floor and hosts student recreational activities on the lower level.

== Athletics ==
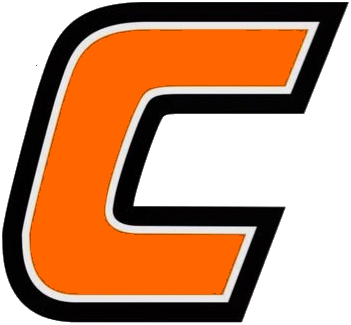
Cobleskill athletics monogram

SUNY Cobleskill teams (nicknamed the Fighting Tigers) participate as a member of the National Collegiate Athletic Association's Division III, after spending years in the National Junior College Athletic Association (NJCAA). The Fighting Tigers are primarily a member of the North Atlantic Conference (NAC) for all sports since the 2020–21 season, with the exception of equestrian which competes in the Intercollegiate Horse Show Association (IHSA) and track & field which competes in the New York State College Track Conference (NYSCTC).

The Fighting Tigers were also formerly a member of the North Eastern Athletic Conference (NEAC) from 2008–09 to 2019–20. Men's sports include: basketball, cross country, equestrian, golf, lacrosse, soccer, swimming & diving, and track & field; while women's sports include: basketball, cross country, equestrian, golf, lacrosse (in 2023–24), soccer, softball, swimming & diving, track & field, and volleyball.

== Notable alumni ==
- Pete Dominick, comedian
- Anthony P. German, Adjutant General of New York
- Peter Lopez (R), 127th New York Assemblyman (2006–2017)
