= Arthur Marsh =

Arthur Marsh may refer to:

- Arthur Marsh (politician), American politician from Michigan
- Arthur Marsh (footballer) (1947–2020), English footballer
- Arthur Hardwick Marsh (1842–1909), British painter and watercolourist
