= Senator Odell =

Senator Odell may refer to:

- Bob Odell (politician) (born 1943), New Hampshire State Senate
- Samuel Odell (1881–1946), Michigan State Senate
