= 1916 Michigan gubernatorial election =

- November 7, 1916
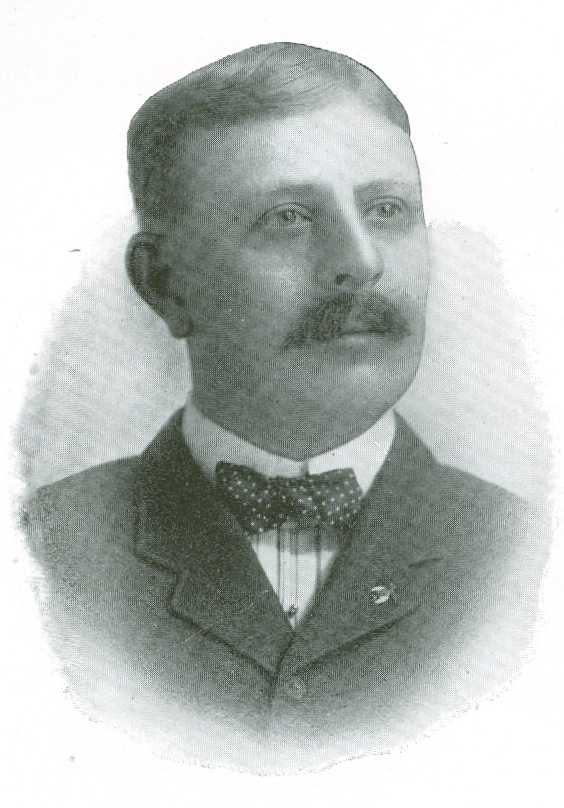

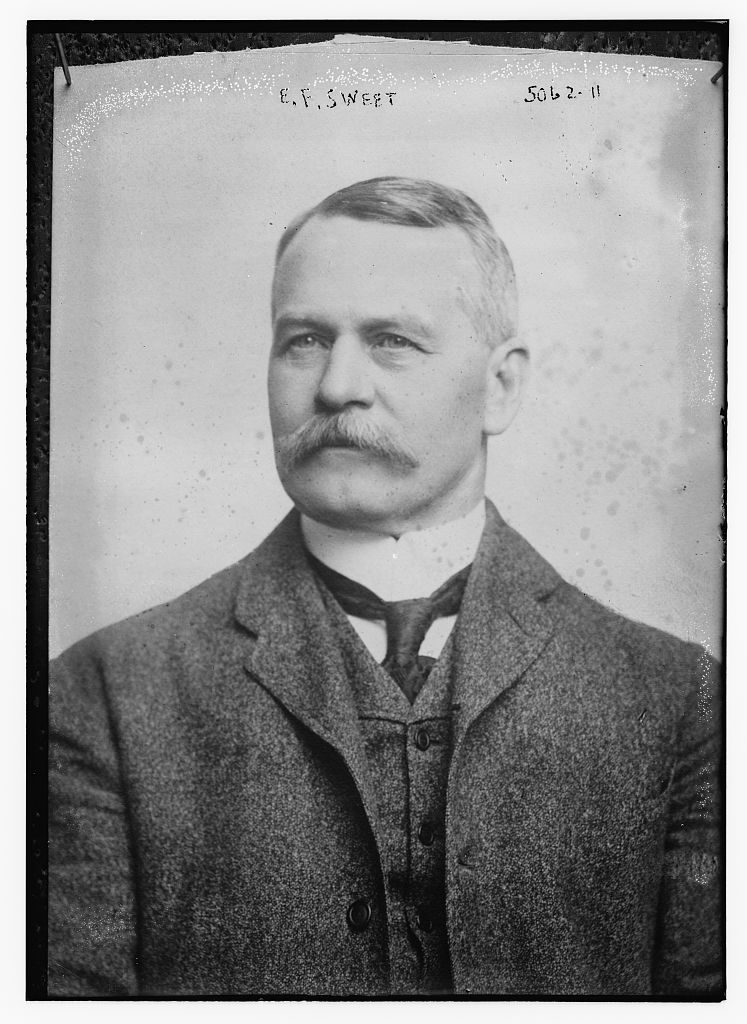
Nominee	Albert Sleeper	Edwin F. Sweet
Party	Republican	Democratic
Popular vote	363,724	264,440
Percentage	55.83%	40.59%
- County results Sleeper: 40–50% 50–60% 60–70% 70–80% 80–90% Sweet: 40–50% 50–60%
Governor before election
Woodbridge N. Ferris
Democratic
Elected Governor
Albert Sleeper
Republican

The 1916 Michigan gubernatorial election was held on November 7, 1916. Republican nominee Albert Sleeper defeated Democratic nominee Edwin F. Sweet with 55.83% of the vote.

== Primary election ==
Michigan held primary elections on August 29, 1916.

=== Democratic party ===
By late July, it was unclear whether or not incumbent Democratic governor Woodbridge N. Ferris would run for a third term. Democrats had considered Charles H. Bender, president of City Trust & Savings Bank, and Edwin F. Sweet, United States deputy secretary of commerce. Both men were from Grand Rapids. On July 25, a meeting of the Democratic state central committee had favored Bender for the nomination. The committee was against asking Henry Ford to run, as he was uninterested in politics. By this time, it was known Governor Ferris would not be running for re-election. Ferris had endorsed Bender's nomination. On July 26, the committee had tentatively selected Bender as their candidate for governor.

Bender had earlier said he did not want to be a candidate. Bender said that he was more interested in business than politics. By July 27, Democratic Committee Chairman A. E. Stevenson and Governor Ferris urged Bender to run, though he was not swayed. Stevenson did not accept Bender's refusal as final and, by July 28, began circulating petitions as preparation for Bender's name to appear on the primary ballot.

By July 31, Bender still refused the nomination, however, he was the only name filed to appear on the Democratic primary ballot for the election in August. Bender ultimately allowed his name to be on the ballot, but had made it clear that he would resign as nominee after the election. In the primary election, despite Ford's disinterest and his name not appearing on the ballot, he received 1,344 votes. He also received 137 votes in the Republican primary. His candidacy was promoted with paper slips.

Bender's refusal left the responsibility of choosing a gubernatorial nominee with the state central committee. Ford was asked by the committee to accept the nomination, though he refused. The committee had decided to return to a potential candidate from earlier consideration, Edwin F. Sweet. After the primary, Sweet had received a telegram asking him to run, though he could not give an immediate answer, as he was in North Dakota, and he'd have to consult with U. S. Secretary of Commerce William C. Redfield in Washington, D.C. before he could consider it. By August 17, Governor Ferris had endorsed Sweet's nomination. On September 2, Sweet agreed to run for governor, after being urged to run by President Woodrow Wilson via telegram. On September 21, Sweet's nomination was confirmed by the state central committee. By September 26, Sweet resigned as deputy secretary, and left Washington for Michigan to begin his campaign.

==== Candidates ====
- Charles H. Bender, banker from Grand Rapids

==== Results ====
Democratic primary results
Party	Candidate	Votes	%
Democratic	Charles H. Bender	28,591	95.18%
Democratic	Scattering	1,449	4.82%
Total votes		30,040	100.00%

=== Republican party ===
Former state treasurer Albert E. Sleeper emerged victorious in a crowded primary field.

==== Candidates ====
- Gerrit J. Diekema, former representative from Michigan's 5th congressional district
- Washington Gardner, former commander-in-chief of the Grand Army of the Republic
- Frank B. Leland, member of University of Michigan Board of Regents
- Albert E. Sleeper, former State Treasurer of Michigan
- Sybrant Wesselius, former member of Michigan House of Representatives

==== Results ====
Republican primary results
Party	Candidate	Votes	%
Republican	Albert E. Sleeper	99,638	34.98%
Republican	Frank B. Leland	90,283	31.69%
Republican	Gerrit J. Diekema	43,741	15.35%
Republican	Washington Gardner	40.881	14.35%
Republican	Sybrant Wesselius	10,160	3.57%
Republican	Scattering	163	0.06%
Total votes		284,866	100.00%

=== Minor parties ===
Socialist primary results
Party	Candidate	Votes	%
Socialist	Ernest J. Moore	1,449	84.94%
Socialist	Scattering	257	15.06%
Total votes		1,706	100.00%

Prohibition primary results
Party	Candidate	Votes	%
Prohibition	E. W. Woodruff	703	82.42%
Prohibition	Scattering	150	17.58%
Total votes		853	100.00%

== General election ==
=== Candidates ===
Major party candidates

- Albert Sleeper, Republican
- Edwin F. Sweet, Democratic

Other candidates

- Ernest J. Moore, Socialist
- E. W. Woodruff, Prohibition
- James R. Murray, Socialist Labor

=== Results ===
1916 Michigan gubernatorial election
Party	Candidate	Votes	%	±%
Republican	Albert Sleeper	363,724	55.83%	+15.81%
Democratic	Edwin F. Sweet	264,440	40.59%	−7.56%
Socialist	Ernest J. Moore	15,040	2.31%	−0.20%
Prohibition	E. W. Woodruff	7,255	1.11%	+0.24%
Socialist Labor	James R. Murray	963	0.15%	+0.03%
	Scattering	96	0.01%	
Majority		99,284	15.24%	
Total votes		651,518	100.00%	
Republican gain from Democratic		Swing	+23.37%	

==== Results by county ====
After this election, Kalamazoo County would not vote Democratic again until 1986.

County	Albert Sleeper Republican		Edwin F. Sweet Democratic		Ernest J. Moore Socialist		E. W. Woodruff Prohibition		James R. Murray Socialist Labor		Margin		Total votes cast
County	#	%	#	%	#	%	#	%	#	%	#	%	Total votes cast
Alcona	664	60.86%	381	34.92%	34	3.12%	10	0.92%	2	0.18%	283	25.94%	1,091
Alger	780	54.81%	561	39.42%	55	3.87%	25	1.76%	2	0.14%	219	15.39%	1,423
Allegan	4,925	55.94%	3,529	40.08%	217	2.46%	118	1.34%	10	0.11%	1,396	15.86%	8,804 (Note: Includes 5 write-in votes for H. R. Pattengill)
Alpena	2,120	60.36%	1,333	37.96%	48	1.37%	10	0.28%	1	0.03%	787	22.41%	3,512
Antrim	1,363	54.78%	930	37.38%	144	5.79%	43	1.73%	8	0.32%	433	17.40%	2,488
Arenac	1,062	54.27%	809	41.34%	53	2.71%	30	1.53%	3	0.15%	253	12.93%	1,957
Baraga	869	66.18%	350	26.66%	83	6.32%	8	0.61%	3	0.23%	519	39.53%	1,313
Barry	3,169	53.86%	2,515	42.74%	100	1.70%	92	1.56%	5	0.08%	654	11.11%	5,884 (Note: Includes 3 write-in votes for H. R. Pattengill)
Bay	7,315	55.72%	5,389	41.05%	318	2.42%	64	0.49%	41	0.31%	1,926	14.67%	13,127
Benzie	954	49.71%	730	38.04%	160	8.34%	64	3.34%	11	0.57%	224	11.67%	1,919
Berrien	7,766	55.37%	5,850	41.71%	222	1.58%	115	0.82%	67	0.48%	1,916	13.66%	14,026 (Note: Includes 6 write-in votes for H. R. Pattengill)
Branch	2,962	46.57%	3,217	50.58%	93	1.46%	85	1.34%	3	0.05%	-255	-4.01%	6,360
Calhoun	7,119	45.86%	7,548	48.62%	645	4.15%	163	1.05%	49	0.32%	-429	-2.76%	15,524
Cass	2,603	48.13%	2,596	48.00%	150	2.77%	51	0.94%	8	0.15%	7	0.13%	5,408
Charlevoix	1,964	56.93%	1,108	32.12%	303	8.78%	61	1.77%	14	0.41%	856	24.81%	3,450
Cheboygan	1,573	50.96%	1,412	45.74%	78	2.53%	20	0.65%	4	0.13%	161	5.22%	3,087
Chippewa	2,621	59.94%	1,585	36.25%	116	2.65%	46	1.05%	5	0.11%	1,036	23.69%	4,373
Clare	1,074	55.02%	779	39.91%	68	3.48%	29	1.49%	2	0.10%	295	15.11%	1,952
Clinton	3,502	62.20%	2,030	36.06%	38	0.67%	60	1.07%	0	0.00%	1,472	26.15%	5,630
Crawford	474	53.08%	394	44.12%	18	2.02%	6	0.67%	1	0.11%	80	8.96%	893
Delta	3,295	63.38%	1,596	30.70%	246	4.73%	42	0.81%	20	0.38%	1,699	32.68%	5,199
Dickinson	2,571	64.78%	1,146	28.87%	206	5.19%	41	1.03%	5	0.13%	1,425	35.90%	3,969
Eaton	3,977	53.01%	3,324	44.31%	105	1.40%	83	1.11%	13	0.17%	653	8.70%	7,502
Emmet	1,817	52.77%	1,315	38.19%	257	7.46%	41	1.19%	13	0.38%	502	14.58%	3,443
Genesee	10,108	52.15%	8,594	44.34%	427	2.20%	185	0.95%	42	0.22%	1,514	7.81%	19,383 (Note: Includes 27 write-in votes for H. R. Pattengill)
Gladwin	1,059	60.58%	650	37.19%	0	0.00%	34	1.95%	4	0.23%	409	23.40%	1,748 (Note: Includes 1 write-in vote for Frank Durfee)
Gogebic	2,334	58.09%	1,421	35.37%	125	3.11%	132	3.29%	6	0.15%	913	22.72%	4,018
Grand Traverse	2,041	48.32%	1,777	42.07%	322	7.62%	59	1.40%	25	0.59%	264	6.25%	4,224
Gratiot	3,531	53.19%	2,896	43.62%	55	0.83%	111	1.67%	6	0.09%	635	9.56%	6,639 (Note: Includes 40 write-in votes for H. R. Pattengill)
Hillsdale	3,541	49.69%	3,377	47.39%	42	0.59%	164	2.30%	2	0.03%	164	2.30%	7,126
Houghton	8,590	64.28%	4,061	30.39%	271	2.03%	426	3.19%	13	0.10%	4,529	33.89%	13,363 (Note: Includes 2 write-in votes for H. R. Pattengill)
Huron	5,267	77.70%	1,407	20.76%	65	0.96%	39	0.58%	1	0.01%	3,860	56.94%	6,779
Ingham	8,732	54.48%	7,023	43.81%	3	0.02%	216	1.35%	55	0.34%	1,709	10.66%	16,029
Ionia	4,149	50.68%	3,771	46.07%	126	1.54%	136	1.66%	4	0.05%	378	4.62%	8,186
Iosco	1,093	61.51%	649	36.52%	20	1.13%	14	0.79%	1	0.06%	444	24.99%	1,777
Iron	2,262	70.51%	791	24.66%	128	3.99%	21	0.65%	5	0.16%	1,471	45.85%	3,208 (Note: Includes 1 write-in vote for H. R. Pattengill)
Isabella	2,836	56.36%	2,041	40.56%	65	1.29%	85	1.69%	5	0.10%	795	15.80%	5,032
Jackson	7,690	49.23%	7,552	48.34%	193	1.24%	169	1.08%	18	0.12%	138	0.88%	15,622
Kalamazoo	6,607	46.25%	6,735	47.14%	748	5.24%	177	1.24%	19	0.13%	-128	-0.90%	14,286
Kalkaska	749	57.75%	437	33.69%	79	6.09%	28	2.16%	4	0.31%	312	24.06%	1,297
Kent	16,495	43.45%	20,169	53.13%	861	2.27%	423	1.11%	17	0.04%	-3,674	-9.68%	37,965
Keweenaw	882	79.96%	174	15.78%	21	1.90%	24	2.18%	2	0.18%	708	64.19%	1,103
Lake	607	62.32%	340	34.91%	25	2.57%	2	0.21%	0	0.00%	267	27.41%	974
Lapeer	3,520	64.56%	1,805	33.11%	28	0.51%	89	1.63%	10	0.18%	1,715	31.46%	5,452
Leelanau	1,010	54.92%	749	40.73%	54	2.94%	23	1.25%	3	0.16%	261	14.19%	1,839
Lenawee	6,330	52.62%	5,465	45.43%	81	0.67%	145	1.21%	6	0.05%	865	7.19%	12,030
Livingston	2,546	52.31%	2,255	46.33%	6	0.12%	59	1.21%	1	0.02%	291	5.98%	4,867
Luce	575	69.87%	228	27.70%	6	0.73%	14	1.70%	0	0.00%	347	42.16%	823
Mackinac	1,121	54.92%	889	43.56%	28	1.37%	3	0.15%	0	0.00%	232	11.37%	2,041
Macomb	4,689	59.75%	3,015	38.42%	45	0.57%	92	1.17%	7	0.09%	1,674	21.33%	7,848
Manistee	2,501	53.07%	2,047	43.43%	108	2.29%	47	1.00%	10	0.21%	454	9.63%	4,713
Marquette	5,532	67.24%	2,260	27.47%	311	3.78%	108	1.31%	16	0.19%	3,272	39.77%	8,227
Mason	2,370	57.95%	1,669	40.81%	0	0.00%	48	1.17%	0	0.00%	701	17.14%	4,090
Mecosta	2,628	60.59%	1,382	31.87%	247	5.70%	77	1.78%	3	0.07%	1,246	28.73%	4,337
Menominee	3,012	63.60%	1,580	33.36%	102	2.15%	39	0.82%	2	0.04%	1,432	30.24%	4,736
Midland	2,227	60.29%	1,356	36.71%	66	1.79%	41	1.11%	4	0.11%	871	23.58%	3,694
Missaukee	1,249	58.28%	847	39.52%	26	1.21%	19	0.89%	2	0.09%	402	18.76%	2,143
Monroe	3,901	48.02%	4,112	50.62%	35	0.43%	74	0.91%	1	0.01%	-211	-2.60%	8,123
Montcalm	3,930	56.30%	2,820	40.40%	98	1.40%	121	1.73%	11	0.16%	1,110	15.90%	6,980
Montmorency	452	60.19%	234	31.16%	54	7.19%	9	1.20%	2	0.27%	218	29.03%	751
Muskegon	6,167	56.00%	4,087	37.11%	610	5.54%	121	1.10%	28	0.25%	2,080	18.89%	11,013
Newaygo	2,512	59.68%	1,475	35.04%	144	3.42%	67	1.59%	11	0.26%	1,037	24.64%	4,209
Oakland	8,149	54.39%	6,371	42.52%	280	1.87%	163	1.09%	19	0.13%	1,778	11.87%	14,982
Oceana	2,014	55.21%	1,373	37.64%	175	4.80%	76	2.08%	10	0.27%	641	17.57%	3,648
Ogemaw	986	57.06%	651	37.67%	38	2.20%	52	3.01%	1	0.06%	335	19.39%	1,728
Ontonagon	1,333	58.46%	794	34.82%	120	5.26%	28	1.23%	5	0.22%	539	23.64%	2,280
Osceola	2,298	64.14%	1,228	34.27%	14	0.39%	42	1.17%	1	0.03%	1,070	29.86%	3,583
Oscoda	270	61.64%	159	36.30%	7	1.60%	2	0.46%	0	0.00%	111	25.34%	438
Otsego	639	58.41%	428	39.12%	11	1.01%	13	1.19%	3	0.27%	211	19.29%	1,094
Ottawa	5,409	54.91%	4,144	42.07%	214	2.17%	76	0.77%	7	0.07%	1,265	12.84%	9,850
Presque Isle	1,573	68.15%	661	28.64%	56	2.43%	8	0.35%	8	0.35%	912	39.51%	2,308
Roscommon	367	61.47%	200	33.50%	23	3.85%	3	0.50%	4	0.67%	167	27.97%	597
Saginaw	10,285	55.64%	7,735	41.84%	306	1.66%	132	0.71%	27	0.15%	2,550	13.79%	18,485
Sanilac	5,128	74.51%	1,511	21.96%	24	0.35%	218	3.17%	1	0.01%	3,617	52.56%	6,882
Schoolcraft	1,079	61.20%	558	31.65%	37	2.10%	88	4.99%	1	0.06%	521	29.55%	1,763
Shiawassee	4,066	54.04%	3,226	42.88%	172	2.29%	53	0.70%	7	0.09%	840	11.16%	7,524
St. Clair	7,161	62.51%	4,095	35.75%	110	0.96%	88	0.77%	1	0.01%	3,066	26.76%	11,456
St. Joseph	3,201	45.55%	3,610	51.37%	194	2.76%	13	0.19%	9	0.13%	-409	-5.82%	7,027
Tuscola	4,722	66.86%	2,135	30.23%	51	0.72%	150	2.12%	5	0.07%	2,587	36.63%	7,063
Van Buren	4,457	57.07%	3,120	39.95%	164	2.10%	57	0.73%	12	0.15%	1,337	17.12%	7,810
Washtenaw	6,510	53.64%	5,388	44.39%	134	1.10%	75	0.62%	30	0.25%	1,122	9.24%	12,137
Wayne	80,294	58.35%	52,856	38.41%	3,413	2.48%	876	0.64%	176	0.13%	27,438	19.94%	137,616
Wexford	2,399	56.61%	1,630	38.46%	115	2.71%	94	2.22%	0	0.00%	769	18.15%	4,238
Total	363,724	55.83%	264,440	40.59%	15,040	2.31%	7,255	1.11%	963	0.15%	99,284	15.24%	651,518

===== Counties that flipped from Democratic to Republican =====
- Alger
- Bay
- Berrien
- Cass
- Cheboygan
- Clare
- Clinton
- Crawford
- Eaton
- Genesee
- Grand Traverse
- Gratiot
- Hillsdale
- Houghton
- Ingham
- Ionia
- Iosco
- Isabella
- Jackson
- Leelanau
- Lenawee
- Livingston
- Luce
- Mackinac
- Macomb
- Manistee
- Mecosta
- Midland
- Montmorency
- Oakland
- Ontonagon
- Otsego
- Roscommon
- Saginaw
- Shiawassee
- Washtenaw
- Wayne
