= Frank E. Gorman =

American politician

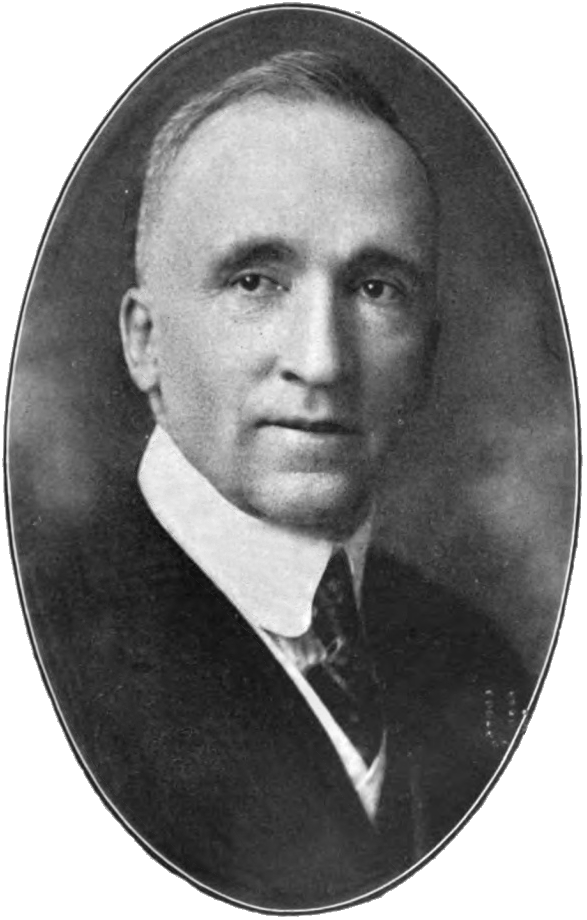

Treasurer of Michigan
- In office 1919–1924
- Governor: Albert Sleeper; Alex J. Groesbeck
- Preceded by: Samuel Odell
- Succeeded by: Frank D. McKay

Personal details
- Born: March 28, 1874 Sanilac County, Michigan, US
- Died: January 7, 1960 (aged 85) Lansing, Michigan, US
- Party: Republican
- Spouse: Clara L. Jenkins

Frank E. Gorman (March 28, 1874 – January 7, 1960) was a Michigan politician.

== Early life ==
Frank E. Gorman was born on March 28, 1874, in Sanilac County, Michigan, to Scotch-Irish parents, William and Ann Gorman.

== Career ==
Gorman served as Deputy Michigan State Treasurer from January 1, 1913, to May 22, 1919. Gorman was appointed to the position of Michigan State Treasurer by Governor Albert Sleeper in 1919. Gorman was then elected on the Republican ticket to the position on November 2, 1920. Gorman served in this capacity until 1924.

== Personal life ==
Gorman married Clara L. Jenkins on September 29, 1898. Together, they had one daughter. Gorman was a member of the Freemasons and the Elks.

== Death ==
Gorman died on January 7, 1960, in Lansing, Michigan.

Political offices
Preceded by Samuel Odell	Treasurer of Michigan; 1919–1924	Succeeded by Frank D. McKay
