= 1900 United States presidential election in Michigan =

- November 6, 1900

All 14 Michigan votes to the Electoral College
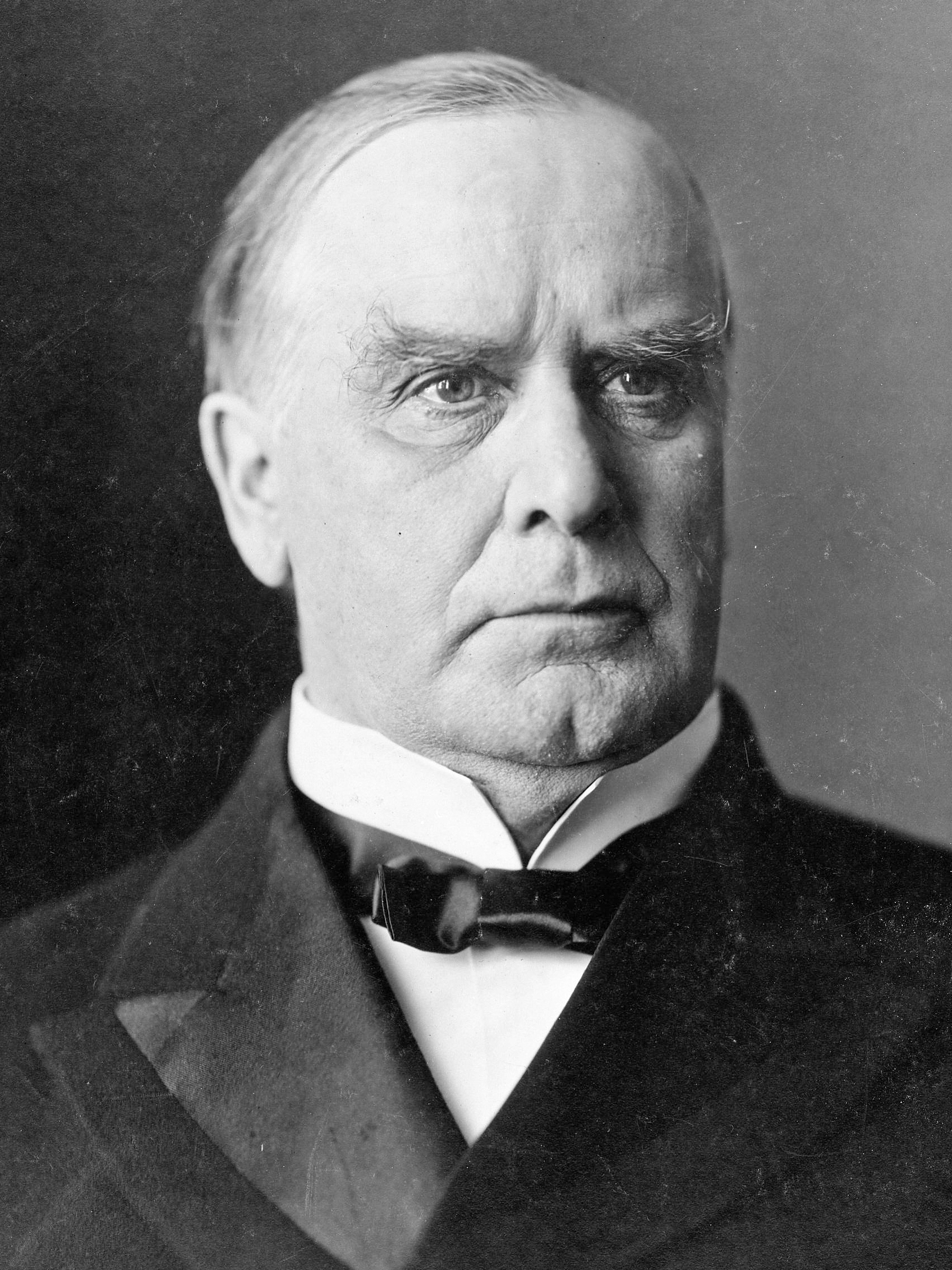

| Nominee | William McKinley | William Jennings Bryan |
| Party | Republican | Democratic |
| Home state | Ohio | Nebraska |
| Running mate | Theodore Roosevelt | Adlai Stevenson I |
| Electoral vote | 14 | 0 |
| Popular vote | 316,269 | 211,685 |
| Percentage | 58.10% | 38.89% |
County results
McKinley
40–50%
50–60%
60–70%
70–80%
80–90%
90–100%
Bryan
40–50%
President before election
William McKinley
Republican
Elected President
William McKinley
Republican

The 1900 United States presidential election in Michigan took place on November 6, 1900, as part of the 1900 United States presidential election. Voters chose 14 representatives, or electors, to the Electoral College, who voted for president and vice president.

Ever since the formation of the Republican Party, Michigan had been a Republican-leaning state due to the Lower Peninsula’s strong history of settlement by anti-slavery Yankees, who after the end of Reconstruction continued to see the need for solid Republican voting to oppose the solidly Democratic Confederate and Border States. During the Third Party System, heavily Catholic and immigrant-settled Southeast Michigan would lean towards the Democratic Party, which was opposed to the moralistic pietism of Yankee Republicans.

In 1892, aided by favorable demographic changes and a legislative change allocating electors by congressional district, the Democratic Party managed to carry five of Michigan’s fourteen electoral votes, and also elect a Governor and a majority to the state legislature. However, the Panic of 1893 turned expectations or hopes of Michigan becoming a swing state rudely on its head, especially when incumbent President Cleveland stood firm, sending in troops to break the Pullman Strike. In the 1894 elections, only one Democrat maintained a seat in the state legislature, a loss of seventy seats compared to the 1890 elections.

During the 1896 presidential election, the Methodist cabinet counties would turn towards evangelical free silver Democrat William Jennings Bryan, whilst the previously Democratic German Catholic counties opposed free silver and turned to Republican nominee William McKinley as the Church opposed free silver and Bryan’s prohibitionist leanings.

During the following two election cycles, the Democrats regained only a small portion of their 1894 losses in Michigan’s legislature. Both McKinley and Bryan would be re-nominated for the 1900 presidential election. Bryan campaigned in the state in early October, relying on a theme of “misrule” in the colonies of Puerto Rico and the Philippines which had been acquired in the Spanish–American War. In a speech at Muskegon, Bryan argued that Puerto Ricans and Filipinos were taxed without representation.

As McKinley's running mate, Theodore Roosevelt did not campaign in the state, as it was viewed as safe for the Republicans. All forecasts had the state being carried by McKinley, and in some the state was regarded as so safe as not to be discussed. These predictions were borne out by the election result when McKinley carried Michigan by 58.05 percent to Bryan's 38.96 percent and all but one county – St. Joseph in Michiana, which would prove the last time until Woodrow Wilson in 1916 when a Democrat won any Michigan county in a two-way race, for the state would become apart from Vermont the most solidly one-party Republican in the nation for the first third of the 20th century.

Bryan had previously lost Michigan to McKinley four years earlier and would later lose the state again in 1908 to William Howard Taft.

== Results ==
General Election Results
| Party | Pledged to | Elector | Votes |
|---|---|---|---|
| Republican Party | William McKinley | Perry Hannah | 316,269 |
| Republican Party | William McKinley | Charles P. Collins | 316,062 |
| Republican Party | William McKinley | Edward Buckley | 316,042 |
| Republican Party | William McKinley | Joseph R. Bennett | 316,033 |
| Republican Party | William McKinley | Edward B. Nugent | 316,026 |
| Republican Party | William McKinley | Charles J. Monroe | 316,023 |
| Republican Party | William McKinley | Lyman G. Wilcox | 316,023 |
| Republican Party | William McKinley | Thomas A. Harvey | 316,010 |
| Republican Party | William McKinley | John S. Thomson | 316,008 |
| Republican Party | William McKinley | Hiram M. Allen | 315,941 |
| Republican Party | William McKinley | Michael Brown | 315,847 |
| Republican Party | William McKinley | James MacNaughton | 315,833 |
| Republican Party | William McKinley | John A. S. Verdier | 314,702 |
| Republican Party | William McKinley | Daniel Cotcher | 312,402 |
| Democratic Party | William Jennings Bryan | Philip B. Wachtel | 211,685 |
| Democratic Party | William Jennings Bryan | Henry Huist | 211,485 |
| Democratic Party | William Jennings Bryan | Thomas A. Walker | 211,483 |
| Democratic Party | William Jennings Bryan | Abraham T. Metcalf | 211,474 |
| Democratic Party | William Jennings Bryan | H. Alexander Crawford | 211,451 |
| Democratic Party | William Jennings Bryan | George G. Robinson | 211,443 |
| Democratic Party | William Jennings Bryan | William Baker | 211,440 |
| Democratic Party | William Jennings Bryan | George S. Stanley | 211,427 |
| Democratic Party | William Jennings Bryan | Orrin R. Pierce | 211,423 |
| Democratic Party | William Jennings Bryan | William P. Nisbett | 211,282 |
| Democratic Party | William Jennings Bryan | Michael F. McDonald | 211,011 |
| Democratic Party | William Jennings Bryan | Alois A. Thuner | 210,743 |
| Democratic Party | William Jennings Bryan | Lorenzo Hublinger | 210,155 |
| Democratic Party | William Jennings Bryan | Stanley E. Parkhill | 209,454 |
| Prohibition Party | John G. Woolley | John Wallace Page | 11,859 |
| Prohibition Party | John G. Woolley | Frederick Elijah Woolsey | 11,829 |
| Prohibition Party | John G. Woolley | Ezra Allen Cross | 11,826 |
| Prohibition Party | John G. Woolley | John W. Doane | 11,822 |
| Prohibition Party | John G. Woolley | George Hicks Newell | 11,821 |
| Prohibition Party | John G. Woolley | John Henry Todd | 11,820 |
| Prohibition Party | John G. Woolley | Patrick James Connell | 11,820 |
| Prohibition Party | John G. Woolley | Hiram Darius Allen | 11,818 |
| Prohibition Party | John G. Woolley | Edson B. Putnam | 11,818 |
| Prohibition Party | John G. Woolley | Vahan Kewin Beshgetoor | 11,815 |
| Prohibition Party | John G. Woolley | Charles Edgar Conley | 11,805 |
| Prohibition Party | John G. Woolley | Thomas Bennet Hughes | 11,792 |
| Prohibition Party | John G. Woolley | Charles Spicer Bellamy | 11,643 |
| Prohibition Party | John G. Woolley | Frank Alroy Luttenbacker | 11,057 |
| Social Democratic Party | Eugene V. Debs | Joseph Galbraith Sr. | 2,826 |
| Social Democratic Party | Eugene V. Debs | Joseph J. Cooney | 2,824 |
| Social Democratic Party | Eugene V. Debs | Richard Henke | 2,823 |
| Social Democratic Party | Eugene V. Debs | Jacob A. Mountain | 2,823 |
| Social Democratic Party | Eugene V. Debs | Henry E. Dorrance | 2,821 |
| Social Democratic Party | Eugene V. Debs | Archibald McClellan | 2,821 |
| Social Democratic Party | Eugene V. Debs | George W. Seward | 2,821 |
| Social Democratic Party | Eugene V. Debs | Fred Schander | 2,820 |
| Social Democratic Party | Eugene V. Debs | Frank Marvin | 2,819 |
| Social Democratic Party | Eugene V. Debs | Eddy M. Plumb | 2,819 |
| Social Democratic Party | Eugene V. Debs | Jacob Fyre | 2,818 |
| Social Democratic Party | Eugene V. Debs | George Wilkinson | 2,818 |
| Social Democratic Party | Eugene V. Debs | Arthur Harvey | 2,816 |
| Social Democratic Party | Eugene V. Debs | James Danford | 2,799 |
| People's Party | Wharton Barker | Carl Lampe | 903 |
| People's Party | Wharton Barker | Thomas Hackett | 898 |
| People's Party | Wharton Barker | John Joseph Cornely | 895 |
| People's Party | Wharton Barker | Charles Bannasch | 893 |
| People's Party | Wharton Barker | William Markwardt | 892 |
| People's Party | Wharton Barker | Charles Gustafson | 891 |
| People's Party | Wharton Barker | Elias Haire | 890 |
| People's Party | Wharton Barker | Charles Truschan | 890 |
| People's Party | Wharton Barker | James Manley | 889 |
| People's Party | Wharton Barker | Willit B. Johnson | 888 |
| People's Party | Wharton Barker | Barney Fabinski | 883 |
| People's Party | Wharton Barker | John Steiner | 883 |
| People's Party | Wharton Barker | Henry Marwinske | 871 |
| Socialist Labor Party | Joseph F. Malloney | Joseph Snow | 837 |
| Socialist Labor Party | Joseph F. Malloney | Jonas M. Borough | 836 |
| Socialist Labor Party | Joseph F. Malloney | John O. Zabel | 833 |
| Socialist Labor Party | Joseph F. Malloney | Edwin D. Cox | 832 |
| Socialist Labor Party | Joseph F. Malloney | Nelson Davis | 832 |
| Socialist Labor Party | Joseph F. Malloney | Charles R. Robinson | 832 |
| Socialist Labor Party | Joseph F. Malloney | August W. Mulhauser | 829 |
| Socialist Labor Party | Joseph F. Malloney | Austin S. Randall | 829 |
| Socialist Labor Party | Joseph F. Malloney | James M. Houghton | 828 |
| Socialist Labor Party | Joseph F. Malloney | Daniel Hutcheson | 827 |
| Socialist Labor Party | Joseph F. Malloney | George N. Lawrence | 827 |
| Socialist Labor Party | Joseph F. Malloney | John Curtiss | 826 |
| Socialist Labor Party | Joseph F. Malloney | Charles Malone | 823 |
| Socialist Labor Party | Joseph F. Malloney | William C. Porter | 813 |
| People's Party | Wharton Barker | Axel Gerdin | 769 |
| Votes cast (Note: Based on highest elector on each ticket) | | | 544,379 |

=== Results by county ===
The results below are those for the highest elector on each ticket. The results listed in the 1900-1901 Michigan Manual are a "general average" for each ticket and thus not the "true" results.

| County | William McKinley Republican | | William Jennings Bryan Democratic | | John G. Woolley Prohibition | | Eugene V. Debs Socialist | | Wharton Barker Populist | | Joseph F. Malloney Socialist Labor | | Margin | | Total votes cast |
| County | # | % | # | % | # | % | # | % | # | % | # | % | # | % | Total votes cast |
|---|---|---|---|---|---|---|---|---|---|---|---|---|---|---|---|
| Alcona | 849 | 84.06% | 145 | 14.36% | 12 | 1.19% | 1 | 0.10% | 2 | 0.20% | 1 | 0.10% | 704 | 69.70% | 1,010 |
| Alger | 1,016 | 69.88% | 416 | 28.61% | 14 | 0.96% | 5 | 0.34% | 1 | 0.07% | 2 | 0.14% | 600 | 41.27% | 1,454 |
| Allegan | 5,597 | 61.11% | 3,283 | 35.84% | 239 | 2.61% | 25 | 0.27% | 2 | 0.02% | 13 | 0.14% | 2,314 | 25.26% | 9,159 |
| Alpena | 2,283 | 59.33% | 1,435 | 37.29% | 32 | 0.83% | 89 | 2.31% | 6 | 0.16% | 3 | 0.08% | 848 | 22.04% | 3,848 |
| Antrim | 2,583 | 74.67% | 737 | 21.31% | 81 | 2.34% | 39 | 1.13% | 6 | 0.17% | 13 | 0.38% | 1,846 | 53.37% | 3,459 |
| Arenac | 975 | 51.18% | 860 | 45.14% | 45 | 2.36% | 19 | 1.00% | 0 | 0.00% | 6 | 0.31% | 115 | 6.04% | 1,905 |
| Baraga | 606 | 63.99% | 332 | 35.06% | 6 | 0.63% | 2 | 0.21% | 0 | 0.00% | 1 | 0.11% | 274 | 28.93% | 947 |
| Barry | 3,292 | 51.42% | 2,896 | 45.24% | 193 | 3.01% | 10 | 0.16% | 2 | 0.03% | 9 | 0.14% | 396 | 6.19% | 6,402 |
| Bay | 6,462 | 54.54% | 5,090 | 42.96% | 236 | 1.99% | 23 | 0.19% | 27 | 0.23% | 11 | 0.09% | 1,372 | 11.58% | 11,849 |
| Benzie | 1,472 | 66.19% | 628 | 28.24% | 112 | 5.04% | 3 | 0.13% | 1 | 0.04% | 8 | 0.36% | 844 | 37.95% | 2,224 |
| Berrien | 6,597 | 55.49% | 4,956 | 41.69% | 188 | 1.58% | 103 | 0.87% | 26 | 0.22% | 18 | 0.15% | 1,641 | 13.80% | 11,888 |
| Branch | 4,298 | 54.77% | 3,416 | 43.53% | 107 | 1.36% | 8 | 0.10% | 8 | 0.10% | 10 | 0.13% | 882 | 11.24% | 7,847 |
| Calhoun | 6,226 | 50.09% | 5,562 | 44.75% | 295 | 2.37% | 293 | 2.36% | 32 | 0.26% | 22 | 0.18% | 664 | 5.34% | 12,430 |
| Cass | 3,217 | 51.80% | 2,826 | 45.51% | 131 | 2.11% | 17 | 0.27% | 5 | 0.08% | 14 | 0.23% | 391 | 6.30% | 6,210 |
| Charlevoix | 2,266 | 71.19% | 779 | 24.47% | 84 | 2.64% | 47 | 1.48% | 1 | 0.03% | 6 | 0.19% | 1,487 | 46.72% | 3,183 |
| Cheboygan | 2,092 | 59.10% | 1,397 | 39.46% | 40 | 1.13% | 6 | 0.17% | 2 | 0.06% | 3 | 0.08% | 695 | 19.63% | 3,540 |
| Chippewa | 2,474 | 71.61% | 892 | 25.82% | 74 | 2.14% | 8 | 0.23% | 3 | 0.09% | 4 | 0.12% | 1,582 | 45.79% | 3,455 |
| Clare | 1,180 | 63.41% | 643 | 34.55% | 34 | 1.83% | 2 | 0.11% | 1 | 0.05% | 1 | 0.05% | 537 | 28.86% | 1,861 |
| Clinton | 3,797 | 55.12% | 2,925 | 42.46% | 139 | 2.02% | 15 | 0.22% | 1 | 0.01% | 12 | 0.17% | 872 | 12.66% | 6,889 |
| Crawford | 441 | 62.55% | 253 | 35.89% | 6 | 0.85% | 4 | 0.57% | 0 | 0.00% | 1 | 0.14% | 188 | 26.67% | 705 |
| Delta | 3,081 | 70.88% | 1,213 | 27.90% | 24 | 0.55% | 12 | 0.28% | 8 | 0.18% | 9 | 0.21% | 1,868 | 42.97% | 4,347 |
| Dickinson | 2,857 | 84.45% | 453 | 13.39% | 48 | 1.42% | 12 | 0.35% | 5 | 0.15% | 8 | 0.24% | 2,404 | 71.06% | 3,383 |
| Eaton | 4,808 | 53.77% | 3,909 | 43.72% | 185 | 2.07% | 19 | 0.21% | 4 | 0.04% | 17 | 0.19% | 899 | 10.05% | 8,942 |
| Emmet | 2,351 | 62.23% | 1,291 | 34.17% | 119 | 3.15% | 6 | 0.16% | 1 | 0.03% | 10 | 0.26% | 1,060 | 28.06% | 3,778 |
| Genesee | 6,486 | 59.46% | 3,931 | 36.04% | 396 | 3.63% | 61 | 0.56% | 8 | 0.07% | 26 | 0.24% | 2,555 | 23.42% | 10,908 |
| Gladwin | 978 | 75.23% | 299 | 23.00% | 18 | 1.38% | 3 | 0.23% | 2 | 0.15% | 0 | 0.00% | 679 | 52.23% | 1,300 |
| Gogebic | 2,168 | 73.07% | 676 | 22.78% | 93 | 3.13% | 11 | 0.37% | 10 | 0.34% | 9 | 0.30% | 1,492 | 50.29% | 2,967 |
| Grand Traverse | 3,126 | 68.33% | 1,288 | 28.15% | 137 | 2.99% | 10 | 0.22% | 4 | 0.09% | 10 | 0.22% | 1,838 | 40.17% | 4,575 |
| Gratiot | 4,261 | 55.45% | 3,207 | 41.73% | 167 | 2.17% | 21 | 0.27% | 5 | 0.07% | 24 | 0.31% | 1,054 | 13.72% | 7,685 |
| Hillsdale | 4,787 | 56.89% | 3,328 | 39.55% | 258 | 3.07% | 27 | 0.32% | 4 | 0.05% | 10 | 0.12% | 1,459 | 17.34% | 8,414 |
| Houghton | 8,032 | 73.41% | 2,424 | 22.15% | 441 | 4.03% | 30 | 0.27% | 9 | 0.08% | 6 | 0.05% | 5,608 | 51.25% | 10,942 |
| Huron | 3,669 | 60.65% | 2,134 | 35.28% | 166 | 2.74% | 64 | 1.06% | 3 | 0.05% | 13 | 0.21% | 1,535 | 25.38% | 6,049 |
| Ingham | 5,353 | 49.62% | 5,102 | 47.29% | 282 | 2.61% | 24 | 0.22% | 7 | 0.06% | 21 | 0.19% | 251 | 2.33% | 10,789 |
| Ionia | 5,101 | 54.29% | 4,058 | 43.19% | 196 | 2.09% | 29 | 0.31% | 3 | 0.03% | 9 | 0.10% | 1,043 | 11.10% | 9,396 |
| Iosco | 1,402 | 66.38% | 680 | 32.20% | 23 | 1.09% | 5 | 0.24% | 1 | 0.05% | 1 | 0.05% | 722 | 34.19% | 2,112 |
| Iron | 1,559 | 84.68% | 259 | 14.07% | 14 | 0.76% | 7 | 0.38% | 1 | 0.05% | 1 | 0.05% | 1,300 | 70.61% | 1,841 |
| Isabella | 2,970 | 58.63% | 1,997 | 39.42% | 70 | 1.38% | 6 | 0.12% | 6 | 0.12% | 17 | 0.34% | 973 | 19.21% | 5,066 |
| Jackson | 6,327 | 48.99% | 6,211 | 48.09% | 332 | 2.57% | 28 | 0.22% | 3 | 0.02% | 14 | 0.11% | 116 | 0.90% | 12,915 |
| Kalamazoo | 6,007 | 53.60% | 4,708 | 42.01% | 256 | 2.28% | 192 | 1.71% | 17 | 0.15% | 27 | 0.24% | 1,299 | 11.59% | 11,207 |
| Kalkaska | 1,312 | 75.53% | 360 | 20.73% | 55 | 3.17% | 8 | 0.46% | 1 | 0.06% | 1 | 0.06% | 952 | 54.81% | 1,737 |
| Kent | 17,891 | 54.79% | 13,794 | 42.25% | 816 | 2.50% | 101 | 0.31% | 28 | 0.09% | 22 | 0.07% | 4,097 | 12.55% | 32,652 |
| Keweenaw | 452 | 92.24% | 31 | 6.33% | 4 | 0.82% | 1 | 0.20% | 2 | 0.41% | 0 | 0.00% | 421 | 85.92% | 490 |
| Lake | 840 | 68.85% | 350 | 28.69% | 14 | 1.15% | 6 | 0.49% | 4 | 0.33% | 6 | 0.49% | 490 | 40.16% | 1,220 |
| Lapeer | 3,709 | 59.62% | 2,217 | 35.64% | 216 | 3.47% | 63 | 1.01% | 1 | 0.02% | 15 | 0.24% | 1,492 | 23.98% | 6,221 |
| Leelanau | 1,484 | 68.45% | 637 | 29.38% | 38 | 1.75% | 4 | 0.18% | 2 | 0.09% | 3 | 0.14% | 847 | 39.07% | 2,168 |
| Lenawee | 6,848 | 51.75% | 5,965 | 45.08% | 346 | 2.61% | 19 | 0.14% | 16 | 0.12% | 39 | 0.29% | 883 | 6.67% | 13,233 |
| Livingston | 2,858 | 49.65% | 2,730 | 47.43% | 152 | 2.64% | 9 | 0.16% | 1 | 0.02% | 6 | 0.10% | 128 | 2.22% | 5,756 |
| Luce | 405 | 70.31% | 159 | 27.60% | 10 | 1.74% | 0 | 0.00% | 1 | 0.17% | 1 | 0.17% | 246 | 42.71% | 576 |
| Mackinac | 1,060 | 61.74% | 632 | 36.81% | 15 | 0.87% | 9 | 0.52% | 1 | 0.06% | 0 | 0.00% | 428 | 24.93% | 1,717 |
| Macomb | 4,244 | 53.84% | 3,489 | 44.27% | 140 | 1.78% | 1 | 0.01% | 0 | 0.00% | 8 | 0.10% | 755 | 9.58% | 7,882 |
| Manistee | 3,146 | 56.25% | 2,340 | 41.84% | 90 | 1.61% | 10 | 0.18% | 2 | 0.04% | 5 | 0.09% | 806 | 14.41% | 5,593 |
| Marquette | 5,237 | 75.42% | 1,476 | 21.26% | 181 | 2.61% | 13 | 0.19% | 33 | 0.48% | 4 | 0.06% | 3,761 | 54.16% | 6,944 |
| Mason | 2,186 | 61.32% | 1,252 | 35.12% | 84 | 2.36% | 34 | 0.95% | 7 | 0.20% | 2 | 0.06% | 934 | 26.20% | 3,565 |
| Mecosta | 2,804 | 65.42% | 1,376 | 32.10% | 89 | 2.08% | 10 | 0.23% | 3 | 0.07% | 4 | 0.09% | 1,428 | 33.32% | 4,286 |
| Menominee | 3,122 | 65.92% | 1,543 | 32.58% | 39 | 0.82% | 13 | 0.24% | 11 | 0.23% | 8 | 0.17% | 1,579 | 33.34% | 4,736 |
| Midland | 1,783 | 57.57% | 1,224 | 39.52% | 51 | 1.65% | 19 | 0.61% | 4 | 0.13% | 16 | 0.52% | 559 | 18.05% | 3,097 |
| Missaukee | 1,420 | 67.11% | 617 | 29.16% | 56 | 2.65% | 18 | 0.85% | 2 | 0.09% | 3 | 0.14% | 803 | 37.95% | 2,116 |
| Monroe | 3,874 | 48.88% | 3,859 | 48.69% | 159 | 2.01% | 12 | 0.15% | 7 | 0.09% | 15 | 0.19% | 15 | 0.19% | 7,926 |
| Montcalm | 4,826 | 63.13% | 2,638 | 34.51% | 149 | 1.95% | 20 | 0.26% | 0 | 0.00% | 12 | 0.16% | 2,188 | 28.62% | 7,645 |
| Montmorency | 542 | 69.04% | 233 | 29.68% | 6 | 0.76% | 3 | 0.38% | 1 | 0.13% | 0 | 0.00% | 309 | 39.36% | 785 |
| Muskegon | 5,247 | 63.55% | 2,801 | 33.92% | 126 | 1.53% | 56 | 0.68% | 20 | 0.24% | 7 | 0.08% | 2,446 | 29.62% | 8,257 |
| Newaygo | 2,612 | 62.73% | 1,423 | 34.17% | 121 | 2.91% | 3 | 0.07% | 1 | 0.02% | 4 | 0.10% | 1,189 | 28.55% | 4,164 |
| Oakland | 6,174 | 53.05% | 4,968 | 42.68% | 458 | 3.94% | 30 | 0.26% | 2 | 0.02% | 7 | 0.06% | 1,206 | 10.36% | 11,639 |
| Oceana | 2,406 | 63.05% | 1,200 | 31.45% | 183 | 4.80% | 13 | 0.34% | 5 | 0.13% | 9 | 0.24% | 1,206 | 31.60% | 3,816 |
| Ogemaw | 1,186 | 67.27% | 518 | 29.38% | 47 | 2.67% | 5 | 0.28% | 4 | 0.23% | 3 | 0.17% | 668 | 37.89% | 1,763 |
| Ontonagon | 982 | 68.77% | 430 | 30.11% | 14 | 0.98% | 0 | 0.00% | 2 | 0.14% | 0 | 0.00% | 552 | 38.66% | 1,428 |
| Osceola | 2,635 | 71.08% | 880 | 23.74% | 175 | 4.72% | 7 | 0.19% | 5 | 0.13% | 5 | 0.13% | 1,755 | 47.34% | 3,707 |
| Oscoda | 245 | 79.80% | 60 | 19.54% | 2 | 0.65% | 0 | 0.00% | 0 | 0.00% | 0 | 0.00% | 185 | 60.26% | 307 |
| Otsego | 1,021 | 68.02% | 435 | 28.98% | 33 | 2.20% | 8 | 0.53% | 1 | 0.07% | 3 | 0.20% | 586 | 39.04% | 1,501 |
| Ottawa | 5,334 | 62.13% | 3,064 | 35.69% | 145 | 1.69% | 25 | 0.29% | 10 | 0.12% | 7 | 0.08% | 2,270 | 26.44% | 8,585 |
| Presque Isle | 1,332 | 71.81% | 494 | 26.63% | 17 | 0.92% | 4 | 0.22% | 5 | 0.27% | 3 | 0.16% | 838 | 45.18% | 1,855 |
| Roscommon | 328 | 64.57% | 175 | 34.45% | 5 | 0.98% | 0 | 0.00% | 0 | 0.00% | 0 | 0.00% | 153 | 30.12% | 508 |
| Saginaw | 8,414 | 50.15% | 7,618 | 45.40% | 208 | 1.24% | 427 | 2.54% | 62 | 0.37% | 50 | 0.30% | 796 | 4.74% | 16,779 |
| Sanilac | 4,177 | 63.96% | 2,064 | 31.60% | 262 | 4.01% | 9 | 0.14% | 1 | 0.02% | 18 | 0.28% | 2,113 | 32.35% | 6,531 |
| Schoolcraft | 1,141 | 69.87% | 461 | 28.23% | 21 | 1.29% | 7 | 0.43% | 2 | 0.12% | 1 | 0.06% | 680 | 41.64% | 1,633 |
| Shiawassee | 5,051 | 56.68% | 3,443 | 38.63% | 390 | 4.38% | 12 | 0.13% | 7 | 0.08% | 9 | 0.10% | 1,608 | 18.04% | 8,912 |
| St. Clair | 7,427 | 61.37% | 4,405 | 36.40% | 193 | 1.59% | 50 | 0.41% | 19 | 0.16% | 8 | 0.07% | 3,022 | 24.97% | 12,102 |
| St. Joseph | 3,194 | 48.23% | 3,293 | 49.72% | 102 | 1.54% | 4 | 0.06% | 2 | 0.03% | 28 | 0.42% | -99 | -1.49% | 6,623 |
| Tuscola | 4,741 | 61.32% | 2,650 | 34.27% | 306 | 3.96% | 14 | 0.18% | 8 | 0.10% | 13 | 0.17% | 2,091 | 27.04% | 7,732 |
| Van Buren | 4,890 | 58.71% | 3,235 | 38.84% | 150 | 1.80% | 22 | 0.26% | 2 | 0.02% | 30 | 0.36% | 1,655 | 19.87% | 8,329 |
| Washtenaw | 5,378 | 50.14% | 5,072 | 47.29% | 222 | 2.07% | 44 | 0.41% | 6 | 0.06% | 4 | 0.04% | 306 | 2.85% | 10,726 |
| Wayne | 36,745 | 55.23% | 28,416 | 42.71% | 558 | 0.84% | 370 | 0.56% | 380 | 0.57% | 64 | 0.10% | 8,329 | 12.52% | 66,533 |
| Wexford | 2,520 | 67.69% | 1,019 | 27.37% | 118 | 3.17% | 57 | 1.53% | 5 | 0.13% | 4 | 0.11% | 1,501 | 40.32% | 3,723 |
| Totals | 316,269 | 58.10% | 211,685 | 38.89% | 11,859 | 2.18% | 2,826 | 0.52% | 903 | 0.17% | 837 | 0.15% | 104,584 | 19.21% | 544,379 |

==== Counties that flipped from Democratic to Republican ====
- Arenac
- Bay
- Branch
- Calhoun
- Cheboygan
- Eaton
- Gratiot
- Ingham
- Ionia
- Isabella
- Jackson
- Livingston
- Monroe
- Saginaw

== See also ==
- United States presidential elections in Michigan
