= 1918 Michigan gubernatorial election =

- November 5, 1918
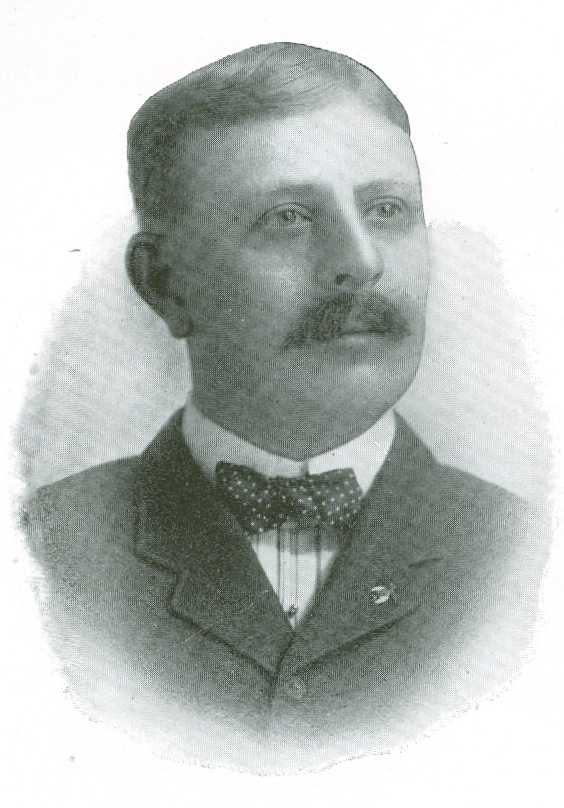

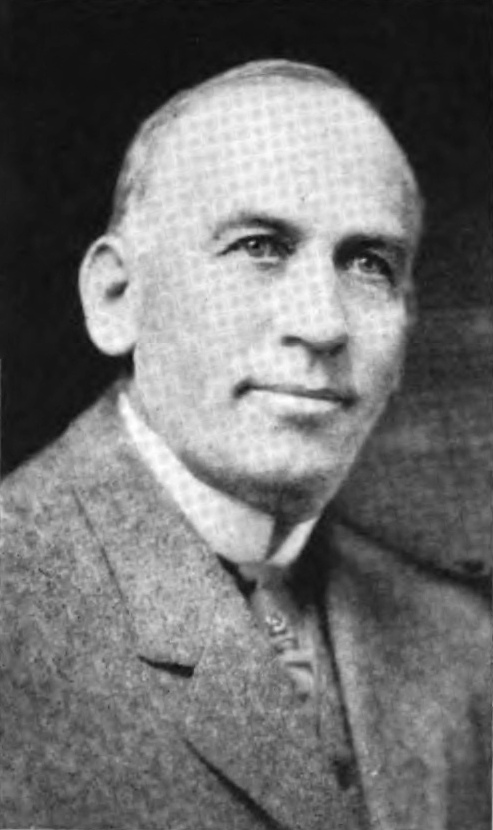
Nominee	Albert E. Sleeper	John W. Bailey
Party	Republican	Democratic
Popular vote	266,738	158,142
Percentage	61.41%	36.41%
- County results Sleeper: 50–60% 60–70% 70–80% 80–90%
Governor before election
Albert E. Sleeper
Republican
Elected Governor
Albert E. Sleeper
Republican

The 1918 Michigan gubernatorial election was held on November 5, 1918. Incumbent Republican Albert E. Sleeper defeated Democratic candidate John W. Bailey with 61.41% of the vote.

== Primary election ==
Michigan held primary elections on August 27, 1918.

=== Republican party ===
Incumbent governor Albert E. Sleeper was renominated without opposition.

==== Candidates ====
- Albert E. Sleeper, incumbent governor

==== Results ====
Republican primary results
Party	Candidate	Votes	%
Republican	Albert E. Sleeper (inc.)	206,316	99.90%
Republican	Scattering	211	0.10%
Total votes		206,527	100.00%

=== Democratic party ===
John W. Bailey secured the Democratic nomination over Edward Frensdorf.

==== Candidates ====
- John W. Bailey, former mayor of Battle Creek
- Edward Frensdorf, member of Board of Prison Control

==== Results ====
Democratic primary results
Party	Candidate	Votes	%
Democratic	John W. Bailey	20,765	56.38%
Democratic	Edward Frensdorf	16,044	43.56%
Democratic	Scattering	19	0.05%
Total votes		36,828	100.00%

=== Minor parties ===
Socialist primary results
Party	Candidate	Votes	%
Socialist	Ernest J. Moore	224	79.15%
Socialist	Scattering	59	20.85%
Total votes		283	100.00%

Prohibition primary results
Party	Candidate	Votes	%
Prohibition	John S. McColl	242	98.37%
Prohibition	Scattering	4	1.63%
Total votes		246	100.00%

Socialist Labor primary results
Party	Candidate	Votes	%
Socialist Labor	John Hinds	135	93.75%
Socialist Labor	Scattering	9	6.25%
Total votes		144	100.00%

== General election ==
=== Candidates ===
Major party candidates

- Albert Sleeper, Republican
- John W. Bailey, Democratic

Other candidates

- Ernest J. Moore, Socialist
- John S. McColl, Prohibition
- John Hinds, Socialist Labor

=== Results ===
1918 Michigan gubernatorial election
Party	Candidate	Votes	%	±%
Republican	Albert E. Sleeper (inc.)	266,738	61.41%	+5.58%
Democratic	John W. Bailey	158,142	36.41%	−4.18%
Socialist	Ernest J. Moore	7,068	1.63%	−0.68%
Prohibition	John S. McColl	1,637	0.38%	−0.74%
Socialist Labor	John Hinds	790	0.18%	+0.03%
	Scattering	1	0.00%	
Majority		108,596	25.00%	
Total votes		434,376	100.00%	
Republican hold		Swing	+9.76%	

==== Results by county ====
Sleeper was the first gubernatorial candidate to sweep every county in the state since Epaphroditus Ransom in 1847.

County	Albert E. Sleeper Republican		John W. Bailey Democratic		Ernest J. Moore Socialist		John S. McColl Prohibition		John Hinds Socialist Labor		Margin		Total votes cast
County	#	%	#	%	#	%	#	%	#	%	#	%	Total votes cast
Alcona	434	65.76%	215	32.58%	8	1.21%	2	0.30%	1	0.15%	219	33.18%	660
Alger	571	64.52%	277	31.30%	25	2.82%	11	1.24%	1	0.11%	294	33.22%	885
Allegan	3,687	69.83%	1,515	28.69%	53	1.00%	20	0.38%	5	0.09%	2,172	41.14%	5,280
Alpena	1,213	62.91%	631	32.73%	72	3.73%	4	0.21%	8	0.41%	582	30.19%	1,928
Antrim	1,024	69.38%	405	27.44%	30	2.03%	12	0.81%	5	0.34%	619	41.94%	1,476
Arenac	707	59.11%	452	37.79%	31	2.59%	4	0.33%	2	0.17%	255	31.32%	1,196
Baraga	756	70.52%	214	19.96%	90	8.40%	10	0.93%	2	0.19%	542	50.56%	1,072
Barry	2,798	65.12%	1,461	34.00%	16	0.37%	21	0.49%	1	0.02%	1,337	31.11%	4,297
Bay	4,901	60.59%	3,058	37.80%	112	1.38%	12	0.15%	6	0.07%	1,843	22.78%	8,089
Benzie	657	62.57%	335	31.90%	44	4.19%	14	1.33%	0	0.00%	322	30.67%	1,050
Berrien	6,059	64.13%	3,169	33.54%	179	1.89%	26	0.28%	15	0.16%	2,890	30.59%	9,448
Branch	2,777	61.47%	1,695	37.52%	28	0.62%	18	0.40%	0	0.00%	1,082	23.95%	4,518
Calhoun	5,697	57.42%	3,981	40.13%	189	1.91%	42	0.42%	12	0.12%	1,716	17.30%	9,921
Cass	2,241	57.29%	1,614	41.26%	48	1.23%	7	0.18%	2	0.05%	627	16.03%	3,912
Charlevoix	1,213	69.27%	476	27.18%	42	2.40%	14	0.80%	6	0.34%	737	42.09%	1,751
Cheboygan	1,201	60.84%	741	37.54%	20	1.01%	10	0.51%	2	0.10%	460	23.30%	1,974
Chippewa	1,608	68.14%	711	30.13%	28	1.19%	6	0.25%	7	0.30%	897	38.01%	2,360
Clare	980	67.31%	444	30.49%	26	1.79%	5	0.34%	1	0.07%	536	36.81%	1,456
Clinton	2,443	69.21%	1,067	30.23%	20	0.57%	0	0.00%	0	0.00%	1,376	38.98%	3,530
Crawford	332	57.04%	237	40.72%	13	2.23%	0	0.00%	0	0.00%	95	16.32%	582
Delta	2,083	64.83%	1,019	31.71%	89	2.77%	9	0.28%	13	0.40%	1,064	33.12%	3,213
Dickinson	1,973	66.41%	859	28.91%	109	3.67%	17	0.57%	13	0.44%	1,114	37.50%	2,971
Eaton	3,483	62.40%	2,042	36.58%	32	0.57%	20	0.36%	5	0.09%	1,441	25.82%	5,582
Emmet	1,299	61.77%	680	32.33%	100	4.76%	17	0.81%	7	0.33%	619	29.43%	2,103
Genesee	6,185	64.01%	3,366	34.83%	98	1.01%	1	0.01%	13	0.13%	2,819	29.17%	9,663
Gladwin	913	74.05%	286	23.20%	27	2.19%	5	0.41%	2	0.16%	627	50.85%	1,233
Gogebic	1,808	65.99%	784	28.61%	81	2.96%	59	2.15%	8	0.29%	1,024	37.37%	2,740
Grand Traverse	1,607	65.17%	786	31.87%	70	2.84%	0	0.00%	3	0.12%	821	33.29%	2,466
Gratiot	2,941	67.61%	1,354	31.13%	24	0.55%	30	0.69%	1	0.02%	1,587	36.48%	4,350
Hillsdale	3,156	62.64%	1,836	36.44%	19	0.38%	25	0.50%	2	0.04%	1,320	26.20%	5,038
Houghton	5,780	68.33%	2,422	28.63%	155	1.83%	85	1.00%	17	0.20%	3,358	39.70%	8,459
Huron	2,750	71.32%	926	24.01%	161	4.18%	17	0.44%	2	0.05%	1,824	47.30%	3,856
Ingham	7,891	59.22%	5,162	38.74%	190	1.43%	62	0.47%	21	0.16%	2,729	20.48%	13,326
Ionia	3,572	59.83%	2,327	38.98%	30	0.50%	39	0.65%	2	0.03%	1,245	20.85%	5,970
Iosco	939	72.96%	309	24.01%	32	2.49%	5	0.39%	2	0.16%	630	48.95%	1,287
Iron	1,277	68.18%	518	27.66%	65	3.47%	7	0.37%	6	0.32%	759	40.52%	1,873
Isabella	2,518	66.04%	1,245	32.65%	28	0.73%	21	0.55%	1	0.03%	1,273	33.39%	3,813
Jackson	4,602	52.86%	4,036	46.36%	56	0.64%	1	0.01%	11	0.13%	566	6.50%	8,706
Kalamazoo	4,707	56.67%	3,360	40.45%	173	2.08%	56	0.67%	10	0.12%	1,347	16.22%	8,306
Kalkaska	481	72.88%	161	24.39%	11	1.67%	6	0.91%	1	0.15%	320	48.48%	660
Kent	16,919	60.24%	10,530	37.49%	506	1.80%	119	0.42%	11	0.04%	6,389	22.75%	28,085
Keweenaw	823	88.40%	83	8.92%	20	2.15%	3	0.32%	2	0.21%	740	79.48%	931
Lake	503	78.23%	131	20.37%	9	1.40%	0	0.00%	0	0.00%	372	57.85%	643
Lapeer	2,845	74.55%	934	24.48%	15	0.39%	22	0.58%	0	0.00%	1,911	50.08%	3,816
Leelanau	734	75.90%	217	22.44%	10	1.03%	6	0.62%	0	0.00%	517	53.46%	967
Lenawee	5,046	58.99%	3,448	40.31%	34	0.40%	24	0.28%	2	0.02%	1,598	18.68%	8,554
Livingston	2,244	56.87%	1,674	42.42%	9	0.23%	18	0.46%	1	0.03%	570	14.45%	3,946
Luce	459	82.11%	95	16.99%	3	0.54%	2	0.36%	0	0.00%	364	65.12%	559
Mackinac	758	56.65%	569	42.53%	8	0.60%	1	0.07%	2	0.15%	189	14.13%	1,338
Macomb	3,495	64.82%	1,775	32.92%	76	1.41%	32	0.59%	14	0.26%	1,720	31.90%	5,392
Manistee	1,832	56.42%	1,303	40.13%	95	2.93%	10	0.31%	7	0.22%	529	16.29%	3,247
Marquette	3,997	68.43%	1,618	27.70%	175	3.00%	36	0.62%	15	0.26%	2,379	40.73%	5,841
Mason	1,685	66.23%	792	31.13%	52	2.04%	10	0.39%	5	0.20%	893	35.10%	2,544
Mecosta	1,729	71.86%	591	24.56%	65	2.70%	17	0.71%	4	0.17%	1,138	47.30%	2,406
Menominee	2,145	58.88%	1,443	39.61%	44	1.21%	0	0.00%	11	0.30%	702	19.27%	3,643
Midland	1,850	70.58%	739	28.20%	21	0.80%	7	0.27%	4	0.15%	1,111	42.39%	2,621
Missaukee	790	74.88%	247	23.41%	12	1.14%	6	0.57%	0	0.00%	543	51.47%	1,055
Monroe	3,282	51.23%	3,061	47.78%	37	0.58%	22	0.34%	5	0.08%	221	3.45%	6,407
Montcalm	3,235	70.43%	1,310	28.52%	25	0.54%	21	0.46%	2	0.04%	1,925	41.91%	4,593
Montmorency	355	68.80%	152	29.46%	5	0.97%	4	0.78%	0	0.00%	203	39.34%	516
Muskegon	4,494	55.95%	3,229	40.20%	281	3.50%	17	0.21%	11	0.14%	1,265	15.75%	8,032
Newaygo	1,988	74.88%	613	23.09%	34	1.28%	20	0.75%	0	0.00%	1,375	51.79%	2,655
Oakland	6,079	59.83%	3,965	39.03%	69	0.68%	34	0.33%	13	0.13%	2,114	20.81%	10,160
Oceana	1,685	73.07%	560	24.28%	41	1.78%	20	0.87%	0	0.00%	1,125	48.79%	2,306
Ogemaw	829	70.02%	334	28.21%	7	0.59%	12	1.01%	2	0.17%	495	41.81%	1,184
Ontonagon	811	64.83%	337	26.94%	91	7.27%	7	0.56%	5	0.40%	474	37.89%	1,251
Osceola	1,763	77.80%	475	20.96%	17	0.75%	8	0.35%	3	0.13%	1,288	56.84%	2,266
Oscoda	209	73.33%	72	25.26%	3	1.05%	1	0.35%	0	0.00%	137	48.07%	285
Otsego	445	74.79%	145	24.37%	3	0.50%	0	0.00%	2	0.34%	300	50.42%	595
Ottawa	4,538	71.24%	1,649	25.89%	156	2.45%	22	0.35%	5	0.08%	2,889	45.35%	6,370
Presque Isle	1,050	72.92%	348	24.17%	36	2.50%	1	0.07%	5	0.35%	702	48.75%	1,440
Roscommon	299	65.43%	149	32.60%	5	1.09%	1	0.22%	3	0.66%	150	32.82%	457
Saginaw	7,523	58.42%	4,999	38.82%	287	2.23%	27	0.21%	41	0.32%	2,524	19.60%	12,877
Sanilac	3,235	78.61%	824	20.02%	30	0.73%	18	0.44%	8	0.19%	2,411	58.59%	4,115
Schoolcraft	806	68.89%	321	27.44%	35	2.99%	5	0.43%	3	0.26%	485	41.45%	1,170
Shiawassee	3,547	66.32%	1,716	32.09%	49	0.92%	36	0.67%	0	0.00%	1,831	34.24%	5,348
St. Clair	4,996	69.15%	2,151	29.77%	62	0.86%	14	0.19%	2	0.03%	2,845	39.38%	7,225
St. Joseph	2,521	56.52%	1,888	42.33%	41	0.92%	8	0.18%	2	0.04%	633	14.19%	4,460
Tuscola	3,220	76.56%	915	21.75%	42	1.00%	27	0.64%	2	0.05%	2,305	54.80%	4,206
Van Buren	3,624	71.78%	1,346	26.66%	54	1.07%	15	0.30%	10	0.20%	2,278	45.12%	5,049
Washtenaw	5,344	61.89%	3,099	35.89%	143	1.66%	25	0.29%	24	0.28%	2,245	26.00%	8,635
Wayne	50,171	53.46%	41,424	44.14%	1,700	1.81%	212	0.23%	347	0.37%	8,747	9.32%	93,854
Wexford	1,571	67.37%	695	29.80%	37	1.59%	27	1.16%	1	0.04%	876	37.56%	2,332 (Note: Includes 1 Scattering vote)
Total	266,738	61.41%	158,142	36.41%	7,068	1.63%	1,637	0.38%	790	0.18%	108,596	25.00%	434,376

===== Counties that flipped from Democratic to Republican =====
- Branch
- Calhoun
- Kalamazoo
- Kent
- Monroe
- St. Joseph
