= Fullerton, North Dakota =

- City
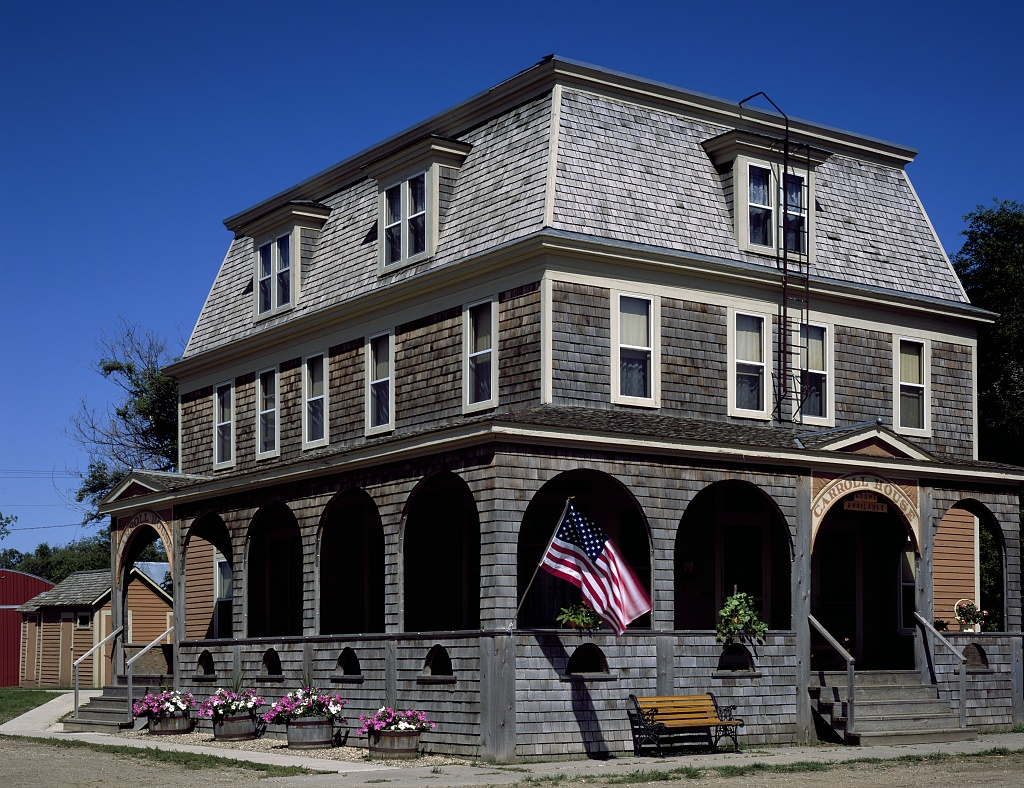
- Carroll House, a historic hotel in Fullerton

- Location of Fullerton, North Dakota
- Coordinates: 46°09′48″N 98°25′38″W
- Country: United States
- State: North Dakota
- County: Dickey
- Founded: 1887

Area
  - Total: 0.39 sq mi (1.01 km^{2})
  - Land: 0.39 sq mi (1.01 km^{2})
  - Water: 0 sq mi (0.00 km^{2})
- Elevation: 1,440 ft (440 m)

Population (2020)
  - Total: 62
  - Estimate (2024): 57
  - Density: 159.0/sq mi (61.38/km^{2})
- Time zone: UTC–6 (Central (CST))
  - Summer (DST): UTC–5 (CDT)
- ZIP Code: 58441
- Area code: 701
- FIPS code: 38-28780
- GNIS feature ID: 1036047

Fullerton is a city in Dickey County, North Dakota, United States. The population was 62 at the 2020 census. The town is home to the Carroll House Hotel, which is listed on the National Register of Historic Places.

== History ==
The city was named after Grand Rapids, Michigan lawyer Edward Philo Fuller (1820–1866). In the 1880s, Edward Fuller was a major investor in the Dickey County land acquisitions with his daughter and son-in-law, Sofia (Fuller) Sweet (1854–1923) and her husband, Grand Rapids mayor Edwin Forrest Sweet (1847–1935). Sweet Ranch was located just to the southwest of what would later become the town of Fullerton.

In 1887, Fullerton's original town plots were surveyed and the Soo Line Railroad through the town site was completed in September 1887. A post office was established at Fullerton in 1888, and remained in operation until 1989.

== Geography ==
According to the United States Census Bureau, the city has a total area of 0.39 square miles (1.01 km^{2}), all land.

=== Climate ===
Climate data for Fullerton 1 ESE, North Dakota (1991–2020 normals, extremes 1898–present)
Month	Jan	Feb	Mar	Apr	May	Jun	Jul	Aug	Sep	Oct	Nov	Dec	Year
Record high °F (°C)	60 (16)	69 (21)	84 (29)	98 (37)	110 (43)	107 (42)	113 (45)	107 (42)	105 (41)	91 (33)	76 (24)	68 (20)	113 (45)
Mean daily maximum °F (°C)	22.2 (−5.4)	27.6 (−2.4)	40.2 (4.6)	55.2 (12.9)	68.2 (20.1)	77.4 (25.2)	82.0 (27.8)	80.5 (26.9)	71.5 (21.9)	56.2 (13.4)	38.7 (3.7)	26.0 (−3.3)	53.8 (12.1)
Daily mean °F (°C)	12.2 (−11.0)	16.8 (−8.4)	29.4 (−1.4)	43.2 (6.2)	56.1 (13.4)	66.2 (19.0)	70.5 (21.4)	68.4 (20.2)	59.5 (15.3)	45.3 (7.4)	29.6 (−1.3)	17.2 (−8.2)	42.9 (6.1)
Mean daily minimum °F (°C)	2.2 (−16.6)	6.1 (−14.4)	18.6 (−7.4)	31.2 (−0.4)	44.0 (6.7)	55.0 (12.8)	59.0 (15.0)	56.4 (13.6)	47.5 (8.6)	34.3 (1.3)	20.5 (−6.4)	8.4 (−13.1)	31.9 (−0.1)
Record low °F (°C)	−44 (−42)	−45 (−43)	−27 (−33)	−15 (−26)	13 (−11)	26 (−3)	32 (0)	30 (−1)	16 (−9)	−4 (−20)	−27 (−33)	−36 (−38)	−45 (−43)
Average precipitation inches (mm)	0.62 (16)	0.66 (17)	1.17 (30)	1.78 (45)	3.54 (90)	4.07 (103)	3.62 (92)	2.62 (67)	2.49 (63)	2.05 (52)	0.77 (20)	0.86 (22)	24.25 (616)
Average snowfall inches (cm)	7.2 (18)	6.0 (15)	6.9 (18)	3.7 (9.4)	0.0 (0.0)	0.0 (0.0)	0.0 (0.0)	0.0 (0.0)	0.0 (0.0)	1.6 (4.1)	4.2 (11)	7.3 (19)	36.9 (94)
Average precipitation days (≥ 0.01 in)	4.3	4.7	4.3	6.6	9.4	10.7	9.1	7.4	6.9	6.3	4.0	3.7	77.4
Average snowy days (≥ 0.1 in)	3.2	3.6	2.9	0.9	0.0	0.0	0.0	0.0	0.0	0.6	1.9	3.6	16.4
Source: NOAA

== Demographics ==
Historical population
Census	Pop.	Note	%±
1910	206		—
1920	202		−1.9%
1930	206		2.0%
1940	184		−10.7%
1950	206		12.0%
1960	181		−12.1%
1970	110		−39.2%
1980	107		−2.7%
1990	94		−12.1%
2000	85		−9.6%
2010	54		−36.5%
2020	62		14.8%
2024 (est.)	57		−8.1%
U.S. Decennial Census; 2020 Census

=== 2010 census ===
As of the census of 2010, there were 54 people in 31 households, including 14 families, in the city. The population density was 138.5 inhabitants per square mile (53.5/km^{2}). There were 39 housing units at an average density of 100.0 per square mile (38.6/km^{2}). The racial makup of the city was 98.1% White and 1.9% from other races. Hispanic or Latino of any race were 1.9%.

Of the 31 households 9.7% had children under the age of 18 living with them, 32.3% were married couples living together, 3.2% had a female householder with no husband present, 9.7% had a male householder with no wife present, and 54.8% were non-families. 51.6% of households were one person and 16.2% were one person aged 65 or older. The average household size was 1.74 and the average family size was 2.50.

The median age was 49 years. 14.8% of residents were under the age of 18; 7.5% were between the ages of 18 and 24; 22.2% were from 25 to 44; 29.7% were from 45 to 64; and 25.9% were 65 or older. The gender makeup of the city was 57.4% male and 42.6% female.

=== 2000 census ===
As of the census of 2000, there were 85 people in 36 households, including 20 families, in the city. The population density was 238.1 inhabitants per square mile (91.9/km^{2}). There were 39 housing units at an average density of 109.2 per square mile (42.2/km^{2}). The racial makup of the city was 95.29% White, and 4.71% from two or more races. Hispanic or Latino of any race were 2.35% of the population. 35.4% were of Czech, 27.7% Irish, 16.9% German and 7.7% Polish ancestry.

Of the 36 households 33.3% had children under the age of 18 living with them, 44.4% were married couples living together, 5.6% had a female householder with no husband present, and 44.4% were non-families. 41.7% of households were one person and 27.8% were one person aged 65 or older. The average household size was 2.36 and the average family size was 3.40.

The age distribution was 35.3% under the age of 18, 7.1% from 18 to 24, 23.5% from 25 to 44, 17.6% from 45 to 64, and 16.5% 65 or older. The median age was 31 years. For every 100 females, there were 97.7 males. For every 100 females age 18 and over, there were 103.7 males.

The median household income was $33,958 and the median family income was $34,583. Males had a median income of $26,250 versus $15,000 for females. The per capita income for the city was $13,222. There were 5.0% of families and 22.4% of the population living below the poverty line, including 30.0% of under eighteens and 25.0% of those over 64.

== Education ==
Ellendale School District is the local school district.
