= Samuel Odell =

American politician

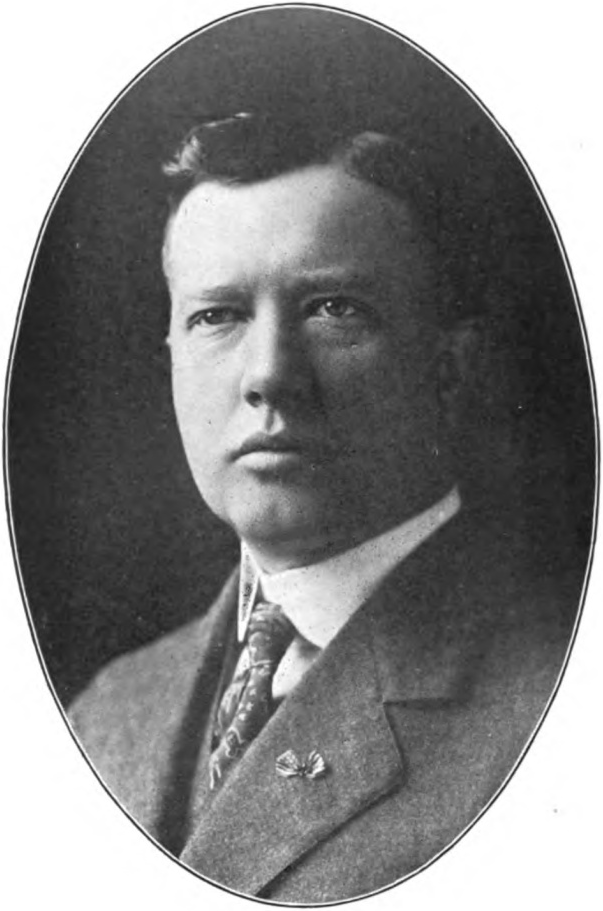

Treasurer of Michigan
- In office 1917 – May 21, 1919
- Governor: Albert Sleeper
- Preceded by: John W. Haarer
- Succeeded by: Frank E. Gorman

Member of the Michigan Senate from the 26th district
- In office January 1, 1913 – December 31, 1916
- Preceded by: Charles Ernest Cartier
- Succeeded by: Charles Tufts

Member of the Michigan House of Representatives from the Oceana County district
- In office January 6, 1909 – December 31, 1912
- Preceded by: George Ensign Dewey
- Succeeded by: Rufus F. Skeels

Personal details
- Born: August 30, 1881 Shelby, Michigan
- Died: July 3, 1946 (aged 64)
- Party: Republican
- Education: University of Michigan

Samuel Odell (August 30, 1881 – July 3, 1946) was a Michigan politician.

== Early life ==
Samuel Odell was born on August 30, 1881, in Shelby, Michigan, to parents Samuel W. and Leila Delite Odell. Odell was of English descent.

== Education ==
Odell attended University of Michigan from 1900 to 1902.

== Career ==
Odell served two terms as supervisor of Shelby Township, Michigan. On November 3, 1908, Odell was elected to the Michigan House of Representatives where he represented the Oceana County district from January 6, 1909, to December 31, 1912. On November 5, 1912, Odell was elected to the Michigan Senate where he represented the 26th district from January 1, 1913, to December 31, 1916. In 1916, Odell was elected to the position of Michigan State Treasurer, and began serving in this capacity in 1917. On May 21, 1919, Odell resigned from this position to become a member of the Michigan Public Utilities Commission.

== Personal life ==
Odell was unmarried during his time in the Michigan Legislature.

== Death ==
Odell died on July 3, 1946, in Shelby, Michigan. He was interred at Oakhill Cemetery in Grand Rapids, Michigan.

Political offices
Preceded by John W. Haarer	Treasurer of Michigan; 1917–1919	Succeeded by Frank E. Gorman
