= Edwin F. Sweet =

American politician (1847–1935)

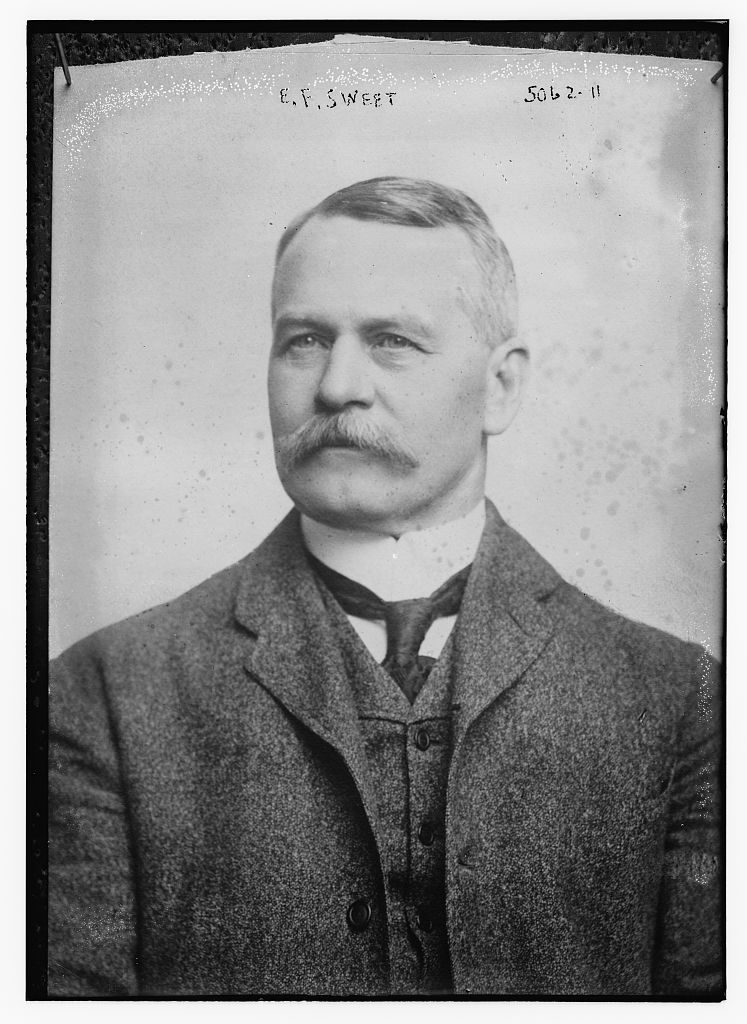
- Edwin Forrest Sweet c. 1915

Member of the U.S. House of Representatives from Michigan's 5th district
- In office March 4, 1911 – March 3, 1913
- Preceded by: Gerrit J. Diekema
- Succeeded by: Carl Mapes

Mayor of Grand Rapids, Michigan
- In office 1904–1905
- Preceded by: W. Millard Palmer
- Succeeded by: George E. Ellis

Personal details
- Born: Edwin Forrest Sweet; November 21, 1847 Dansville, New York, U.S.
- Died: April 2, 1935 (aged 87) Ojai, California, U.S.
- Party: Democratic
- Spouse: Sophia Fuller (after 1876)
- Education: Yale College; University of Michigan

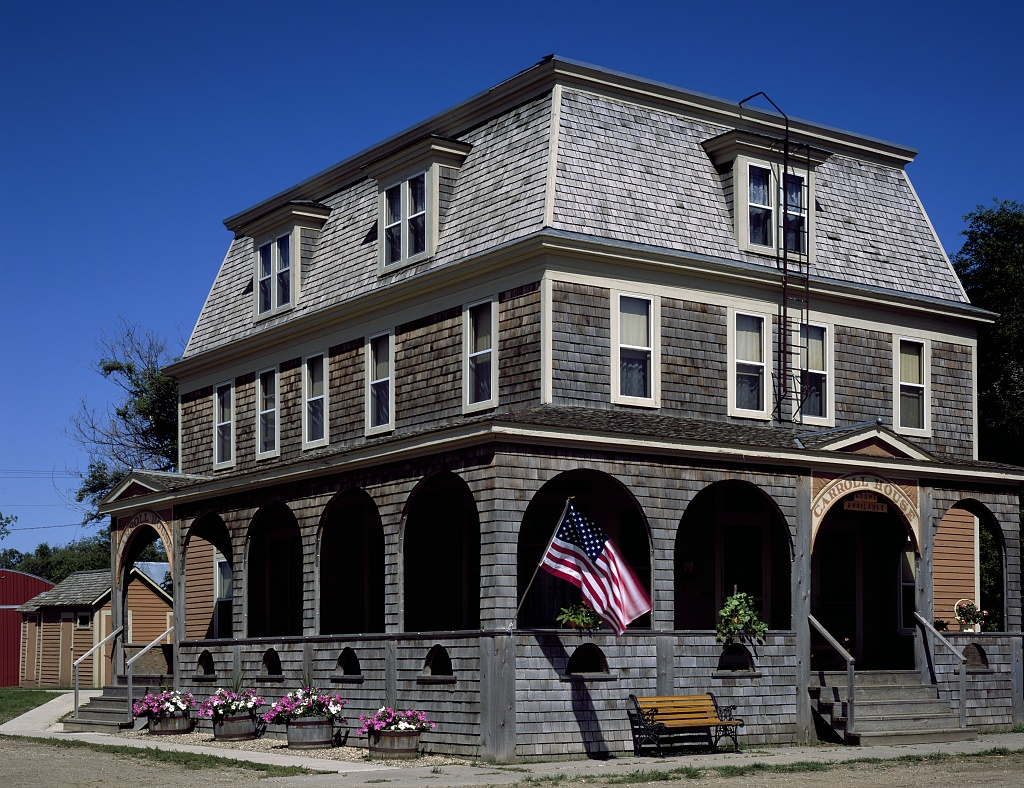
Carroll House Hotel Fullerton, North Dakota

Edwin Forrest Sweet (November 21, 1847 – April 2, 1935) was an American politician from the U.S. state of Michigan.

== Early life ==
Edwin F. Sweet was born in Dansville, New York. He was the son of Sidney Sweet and Hannah (née Redmond) Sweet. He attended the common schools and Dansville Seminary. He graduated from the literary department of Yale College in 1871, where he was a member of Skull and Bones. He was a brother of the Delta Kappa Epsilon fraternity (Phi chapter).

After graduation, Sweet engaged in a tour of Europe and the Holy Land. Departing from New York city October 9, 1871, he went to Liverpool, Wales, London, Paris, Marseille, Rome, Naples, and Brindisi. He then sailed to Alexandria, Egypt, went up the River Nile to the first Cataract, and then spent a month in Palestine. On his return, he passed through Syria, Constantinople, Athens, Venice, Switzerland, Austria, Prussia, Sweden, and Scotland. He returned to New York City one year to the day after his departure. In January 1873, he entered the law department of the University of Michigan at Ann Arbor and graduated in 1874.

== Career ==
He was admitted to the bar in 1874 and was employed as a clerk in the law firm of Hughes, O'Brien & Smiley in Grand Rapids, Michigan. In April 1876, he formed the law firm of Stuart & Sweet. Sweet was a member of the board of education from 1899 to 1906.

He served as Mayor of Grand Rapids from 1904 to 1906. Sweet defeated incumbent Republican U.S. Representative Gerrit J. Diekema, to be elected as a Democrat from Michigan's 5th congressional district to the 62nd United States Congress, serving from March 4, 1911, to March 3, 1913. In 1912, he lost in the general election to Republican Carl E. Mapes.

In 1913, Sweet was appointed by U.S. President Woodrow Wilson to be Assistant Secretary of Commerce, where he served until 1921. In 1916 he was an unsuccessful candidate for Governor of Michigan, losing to Albert Sleeper. In 1919-1920 he served as vice chairman of the Federal Electric Railways Commission. He was member of the board of education of Grand Rapids from 1923 to 1926 and a member of the city commission from 1926 to 1928.

In the early 1880s, he invested in the Sweet Ranch in Dickey County, North Dakota. He is listed as the founder of Fullerton, North Dakota which was named in honor of his father-in-law and owner of the Carroll House Hotel in Fullerton which is now listed on the National Register of Historic Places.

== Personal life ==
In 1876, Sweet was married to Sophia Fuller Sweet (1854–1923), daughter of Grand Rapids attorney Edward Philo Fuller (1820–1886). Together, they were the parents of:

- Carroll Fuller Sweet (1877–1955), who married Agnes Marie Callahan (1885–1969) in 1908.
- George Philo Sweet (1881–1924), who married Jessie Louise Ellicott died from tuberculosis at the age of 42.

He resided in Grand Rapids until 1928 when he retired and moved to Ojai, California where he died on April 2, 1935. He is interred in Oakhill Cemetery, Grand Rapids.

Upon learning of Sweet's death, Carl Mapes said on the floor of the House of Representatives on April 3, 1935: "Mr. Speaker, the morning's paper carries the notice of the death, in California, of a former distinguished Democratic Member of the House, who represented the Fifth Congressional District of Michigan in the Sixty-second Congress, Hon. Edwin F. Sweet. He died at the ripe old age of 87. After his service in the House, he served as Assistant Secretary of Commerce during the 8 years of the Wilson administration. He was an honored and highly respected citizen and a capable and patriotic public servant."

Party political offices
Preceded by Woodbridge N. Ferris	Democratic nominee for Governor of Michigan; 1916	Succeeded by John W. Bailey
Political offices
Preceded by W. Millard Palmer	Mayor of Grand Rapids, Michigan; 1904–1905	Succeeded by George E. Ellis
U.S. House of Representatives
Preceded by Gerrit J. Diekema	United States Representative for the 5th congressional district of Michigan; 1911–1913	Succeeded by Carl Mapes
