= John W. Haarer =

American politician

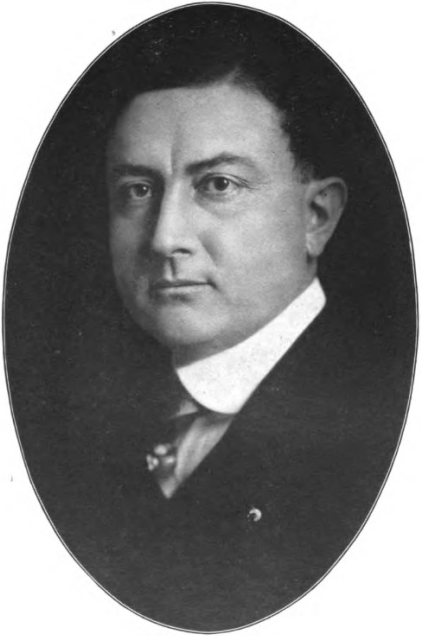

Treasurer of Michigan
- In office 1913–1916
- Governor: Woodbridge N. Ferris
- Preceded by: Albert Sleeper
- Succeeded by: Samuel Odell

Personal details
- Born: April 21, 1876 Ann Arbor, Michigan, US
- Died: April 24, 1941 (aged 65) Jackson, Michigan, US
- Party: Republican

John W. Haarer (April 21, 1876 – April 24, 1941) served as the Treasurer of Michigan.

== Early life ==
Haarer was born on April 21, 1876, in Ann Arbor, Michigan.

== Career ==
Haarer worked as a banker and in the insurance business. In 1902, Haarer ran for the Michigan House of Representatives seat representing the Washtenaw County 1st district. Haarer served as Treasurer of Michigan from 1913 to 1916 under Governor Woodbridge N. Ferris.

== Personal life ==
Haarer married Klara A. Bissinger on January 6, 1903. Haarer was affiliated with the Shriners, Elks, and the Freemasons.

== Death ==
Haarer died on April 24, 1941, of a heart attack in Jackson, Michigan.

Political offices
| Preceded by Albert Sleeper | Treasurer of Michigan; 1913–1916 | Succeeded by Samuel Odell |
