= William A. Tateum =

American politician

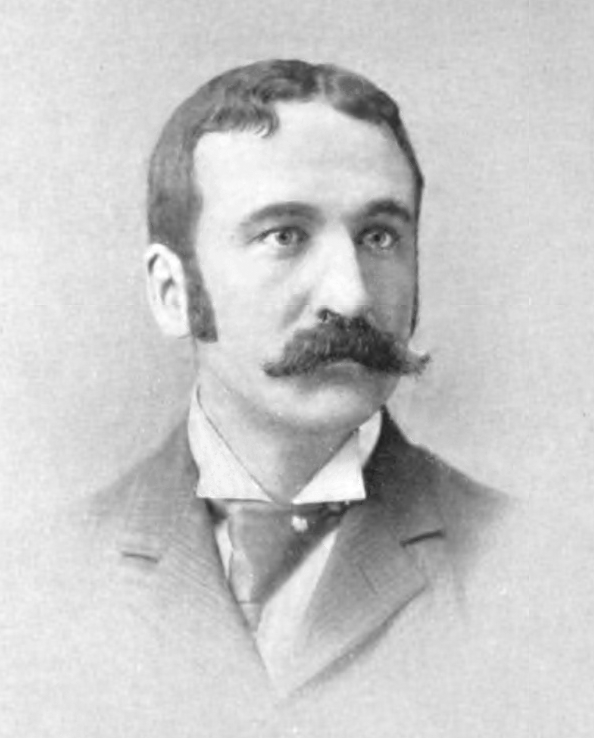

33rd Speaker of the Michigan House of Representatives
- In office January 4, 1893 – May 29, 1893
- Preceded by: Philip B. Wachtel
- Succeeded by: William D. Gordon

Member of the Michigan House of Representatives from the Kent County 1st district
- In office 1893–1894
- Preceded by: Charles Holden

Personal details
- Born: William Aldrich Tateum; August 31, 1862 Worcester County, Massachusetts
- Died: May 15, 1957 (aged 94) Grand Rapids, Michigan
- Resting place: Newaygo Cemetery, Newaygo, Michigan
- Party: Republican
- Spouse: Mary
- Education: Wesleyan University
- Profession: Lawyer

William Aldrich Tateum (August 31, 1862 – May 15, 1957) was a Republican member of the Michigan House of Representatives from 1893 through 1894. For his one term, he served as Speaker of the House, during the 37th Legislature.

== Early years ==
Born in Worcester County, Massachusetts in 1862, Tateum graduated from Wesleyan University in Connecticut.

== Career ==
He was admitted to the Massachusetts bar before moving to Michigan. Tateum was elected to the Grand Rapids City Council (then called the board of aldermen) in 1891 before his election to the House in 1892.

== Death ==
Tateum died on May 15, 1957, aged 94.
