= Carl E. Mapes =

American politician (1874-1939)

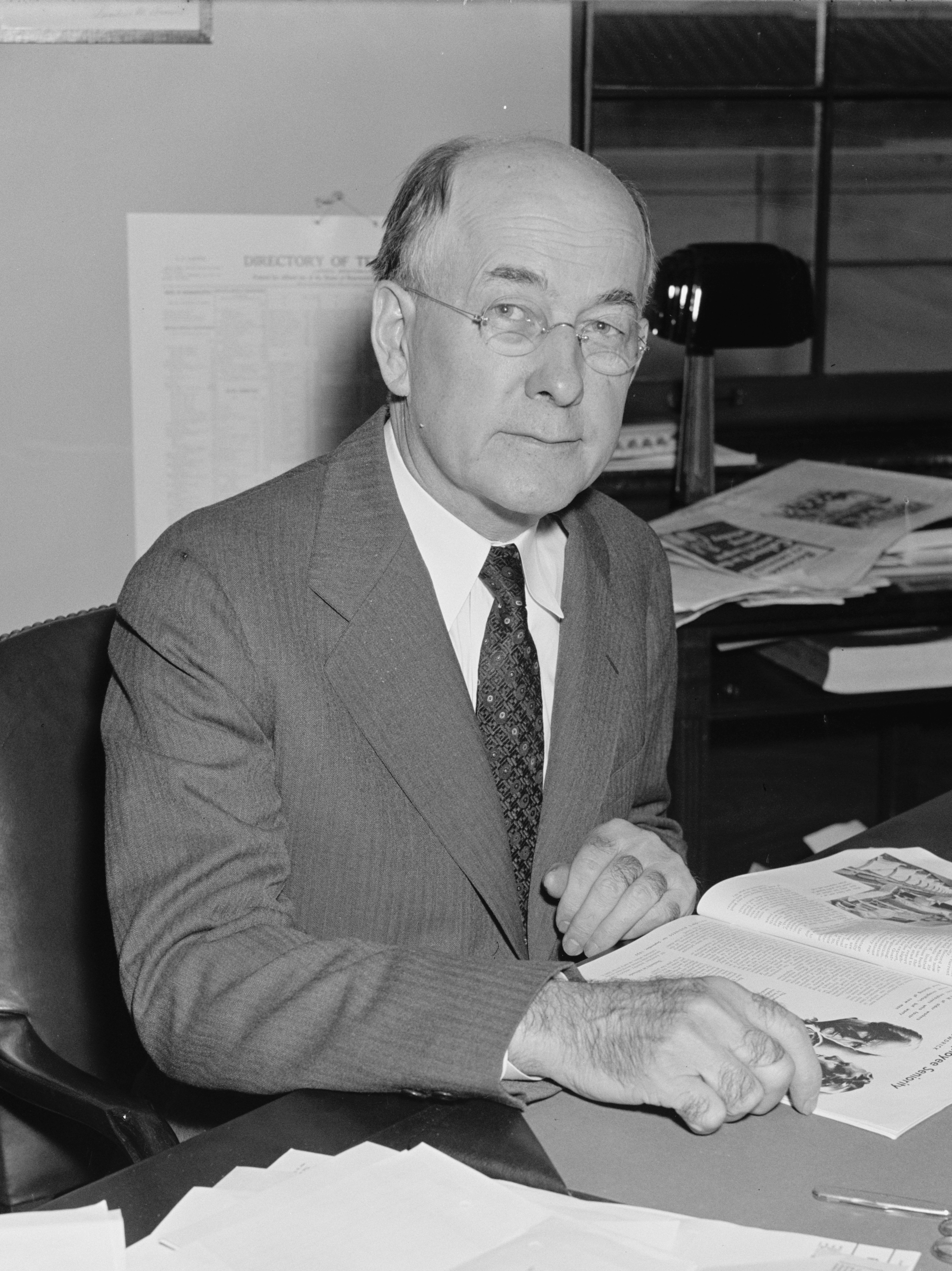
- Mapes in 1939

Member of the U.S. House of Representatives from Michigan's 5th district
- In office March 4, 1913 – December 12, 1939
- Preceded by: Edwin F. Sweet
- Succeeded by: Bartel J. Jonkman

Member of the Michigan Senate from the 16th district
- In office 1909–1912
- Preceded by: Andrew Fyfe
- Succeeded by: Leonard D. Verdier

Member of the Michigan House of Representatives from the Kent 1 district
- In office 1905–1906

Personal details
- Born: December 26, 1874 Kalamo, Michigan, U.S.
- Died: December 12, 1939 (aged 64) New Orleans, Louisiana, U.S.
- Party: Republican
- Spouse: Julia Pike (after 1907)
- Children: 4
- Education: Olivet College; University of Michigan

Carl Edgar Mapes (December 26, 1874 – December 12, 1939) was a politician from the U.S. state of Michigan.

Mapes was born on a farm near Kalamo, Michigan, to Selah W. and Sarah Ann (Brooks) Mapes. His father was born in New York and came with his parents at the age of seven to Kalamo Michigan, where he became a county district schoolteacher and held various township offices. He was also president of the Barry and Eaton County Farmers Mutual Fire Insurance Company and the Michigan Tornado and Cyclone Insurance Company. Sarah Ann was from Washtenaw County and was married to Selah Mapes on April 12, 1887. Selah and Sarah Ann moved to Olivet in 1887.

Carl Mapes attended the common schools of Olivet and graduated from Olivet College in 1896. He graduated from the law department of the University of Michigan at Ann Arbor in 1899, was admitted to the bar that same year and commenced the practice of law in Grand Rapids. In 1901, he became assistant prosecuting attorney of Kent County, serving until January 1, 1905, when he began a term in the Michigan House of Representatives, representing the 1st district in Kent County. He was an unsuccessful candidate for re-nomination in 1906. In 1908, he was elected to the Michigan Senate from the 16th district, and served from 1909 to 1912.

In 1912, Mapes defeated incumbent Democratic U.S. Representative Edwin F. Sweet to be elected as a Republican from Michigan's 5th congressional district to the 63rd United States Congress. He was re-elected to the thirteen succeeding Congresses, serving from March 4, 1913, until his death in New Orleans, Louisiana on December 12, 1939. During the 66th Congress, he served as chairman of the Committee on the District of Columbia.

Mapes married Miss Julia Pike, the daughter of Abram and Eliza (Roberts) Pike of Grand Rapids on August 14, 1907. They had four children, Robert W., John Pike, Jane Elizabeth, and Ruth. Mapes belonged to the Park Congregational Church and was a member of the Freemasons, and was the 1913 Worshipful Master of York Lodge No. 410 of Grand Rapids Michigan. He was also a member of the Odd Fellows and Woodmen. He was interred at Oak Hill Cemetery in Grand Rapids, Michigan.

== See also ==
- List of members of the United States Congress who died in office (1900–1949)

U.S. House of Representatives
Preceded by Edwin F. Sweet	United States Representative for the 5th congressional district of Michigan; 1913 – 1939	Succeeded by Bartel J. Jonkman
