= Carroll House Hotel =

- U.S. National Register of Historic Places
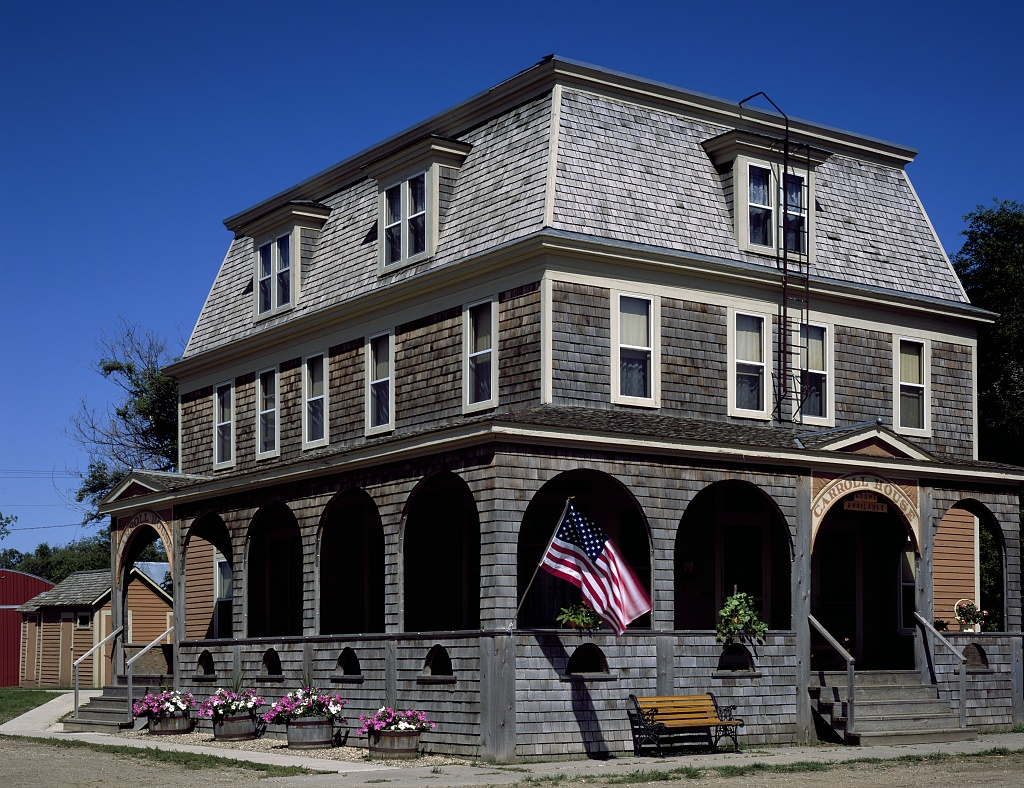

- Location within North Dakota Location within the United States
- Interactive map of Carroll House Hotel
- Location: 19 N. Monroe St., Fullerton, North Dakota
- Coordinates: 46°9′44″N 98°25′37″W
- Area: less than one acre
- Built: 1889
- Built by: Keller, Herman; Butchardt, Mr.
- Architectural style: Shingle Style, Second Empire
- NRHP reference No.: 94000221
- Added to NRHP: March 17, 1994

The Carroll House Hotel on Monroe St. in Fullerton, North Dakota was listed on the National Register of Historic Places in 1994. The listing included three contributing buildings which included Shingle Style architecture and Second Empire architecture.

== History ==
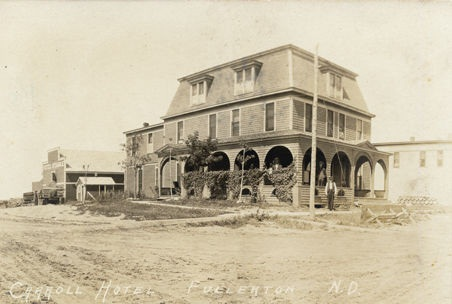
Carroll Hotel on an early 1900s postcard

Carroll House Hotel was built in 1889. The hotel was named for Carroll Fuller Sweet (1877-1955), son of the hotel owner Sofia (Fuller) Sweet (1854-1923) and her husband Grand Rapids, Michigan mayor Edwin Forrest Sweet (1847-1935).

According to its NRHP nomination, "the Carroll House Hotel is locally significant in the area of commerce, because it was among the first businesses located in the Fullerton community, and it is the only extant and best preserved example of a hotel and restaurant from the late nineteenth century." Also its "architectural composition, one of restraint and simplicity, represents the Second Empire and Shingle styles from this period. Few changes have occurred with the building, resulting in a high degree of integrity."

In 1981, the Carroll House was purchased by the Fullerton Community Betterment Association which restored the building. It now operates as a bed-and-breakfast.
