= Gerrit J. Diekema =

American politician (1859–1930)

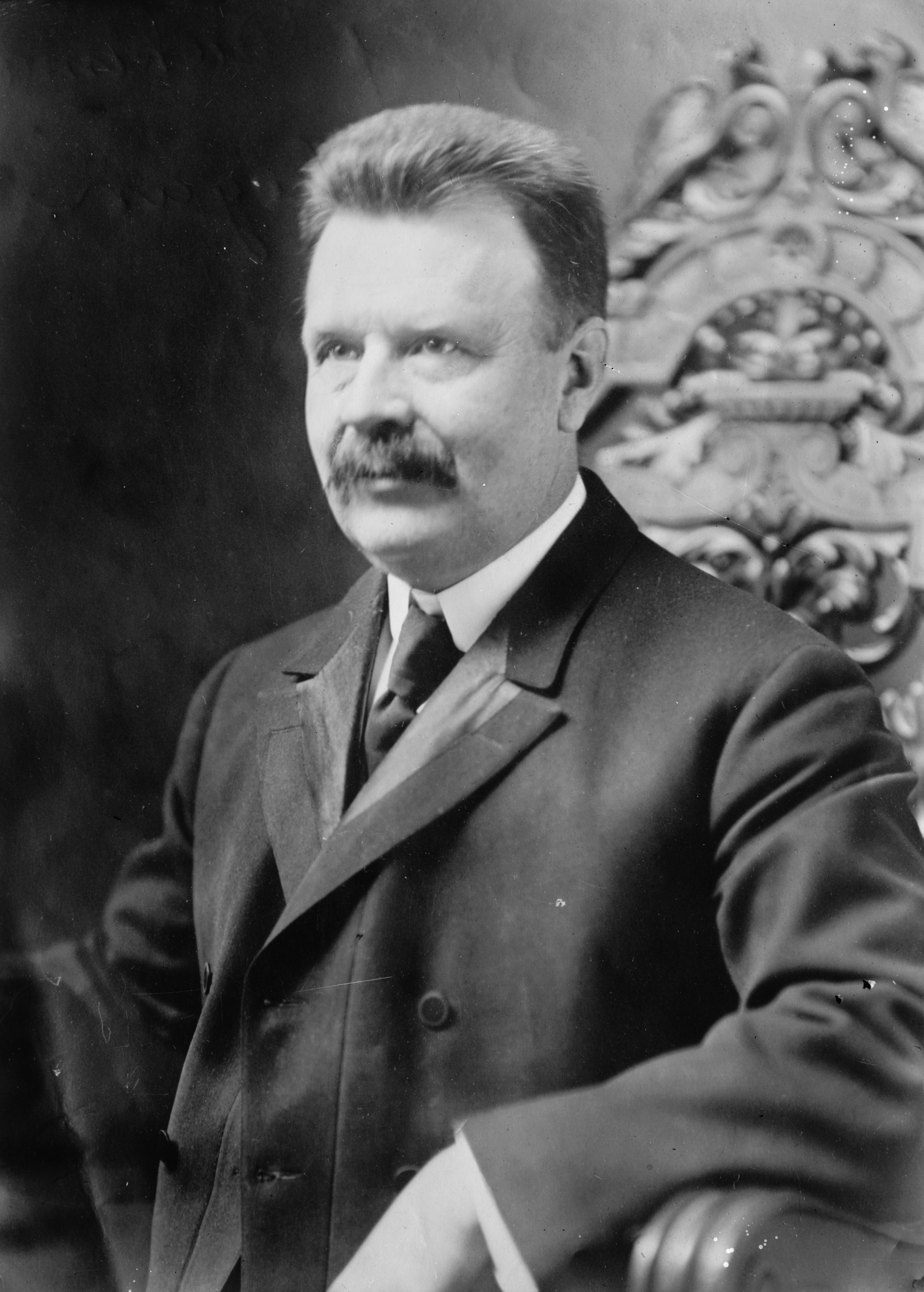

Ambassador of the United States to the Netherlands
- In office November 20, 1929 – December 20, 1930
- President: Herbert Hoover
- Preceded by: Richard M. Tobin
- Succeeded by: Laurits S. Swenson

Chairman of the Michigan Republican Party
- In office 1927–1929
- Preceded by: Kennedy L. Potter
- Succeeded by: Howard C. Lawrence
- In office 1900–1910
- Preceded by: Arthur Marsh
- Succeeded by: Frank Knox

Member of the U.S. House of Representatives from Michigan's 5th district
- In office May 15, 1907 – March 3, 1911
- Preceded by: William Alden Smith
- Succeeded by: Edwin F. Sweet

31st Speaker of the Michigan House of Representatives
- In office 1889–1889
- Preceded by: Daniel P. Markey
- Succeeded by: Philip B. Wachtel

Member of the Michigan House of Representatives from the Ottawa County 1st district
- In office 1885–1892
- Preceded by: John B. Perham
- Succeeded by: Charles K. Hoyt and John W. Norrington (Ottawa County)

Personal details
- Born: Gerrit John Diekema; March 27, 1859 Holland, Michigan, U.S.
- Died: December 20, 1930 (aged 71) The Hague, Netherlands
- Resting place: Pilgrim Home Cemetery, Holland, Michigan
- Party: Republican
- Education: University of Michigan

Gerrit John Diekema (March 27, 1859 – December 20, 1930) was a politician from the U.S. state of Michigan.

== Biography ==
Diekema was born in Holland, Michigan, where he attended the common schools and graduated from Hope College in 1881. In 1883, he graduated from the law department of the University of Michigan at Ann Arbor, was admitted to the bar, and commenced practice in Holland.

== Career ==
Diekema became a city attorney and a member of the Michigan State House of Representatives serving from 1885 to 1891 from Ottawa County 1st District, serving as speaker from 1889 to 1890. He became mayor of Holland in 1895 and chairman of the Michigan Republican Party ten consecutive years from 1900 to 1910. He was a delegate to the 1896 Republican National Convention and a member of the Spanish Treaty Claims Commission from 1901 until he resigned in May 1907.

He was elected April 27, 1907, as a Republican from Michigan's 5th congressional district to the Sixtieth Congress, to fill the vacancy caused by the resignation of William Alden Smith. He was subsequently re-elected to the Sixty-first Congress, serving from May 15, 1907, to March 3, 1911. He was an unsuccessful candidate for reelection in 1910 to the Sixty-second Congress and resumed the practice of law in Holland, Michigan.

He became manager of the Republican Speakers’ Bureau in Chicago in 1912 and a candidate in the primary for Governor of Michigan in 1916. He was a delegate to the 1924 Republican National Convention from Michigan. After seventeen years he was re-elected chairman of the Michigan Republican Party, serving from 1927 to 1929, a record total of twelve years.

Diekema was appointed United States Minister to the Netherlands by President Herbert Hoover on August 20, 1929, and served until December 1930.

== Personal life ==
On December 20, 1930, Diekema died in The Hague, Netherlands. Diekema was interred in Pilgrim Home Cemetery, Holland, Michigan.

== Bibliography ==
- Schrier, William (1970). Gerrit J. Diekema, orator; a rhetorical study of the political and occasional addresses of Gerrit J. Diekema. Grand Rapids: W. B. Eerdmans. OCLC 692685.
- Vander Hill, Charles Warren (1970). Gerrit J. Diekema. Grand Rapids: W. B. Eerdmans. OCLC 96421.

Party political offices
Preceded by Arthur M. Marsh	Chairman of the Michigan Republican Party; 1900 – 1910	Succeeded by Frank Knox
Preceded by Kennedy L. Potter	Chairman of the Michigan Republican Party; 1927 – 1929	Succeeded by Howard C. Lawrence
U.S. House of Representatives
Preceded by William Alden Smith	Member of the U.S. House of Representatives from Michigan's 5th congressional district April 27, 1907 – March 3, 1911	Succeeded by Edwin F. Sweet
Diplomatic posts
Preceded by Richard M. Tobin	U.S. Ambassador to the Netherlands; 1929–1930	Succeeded by Laurits S. Swenson
