= Philip B. Wachtel =

American politician (1851–1913)

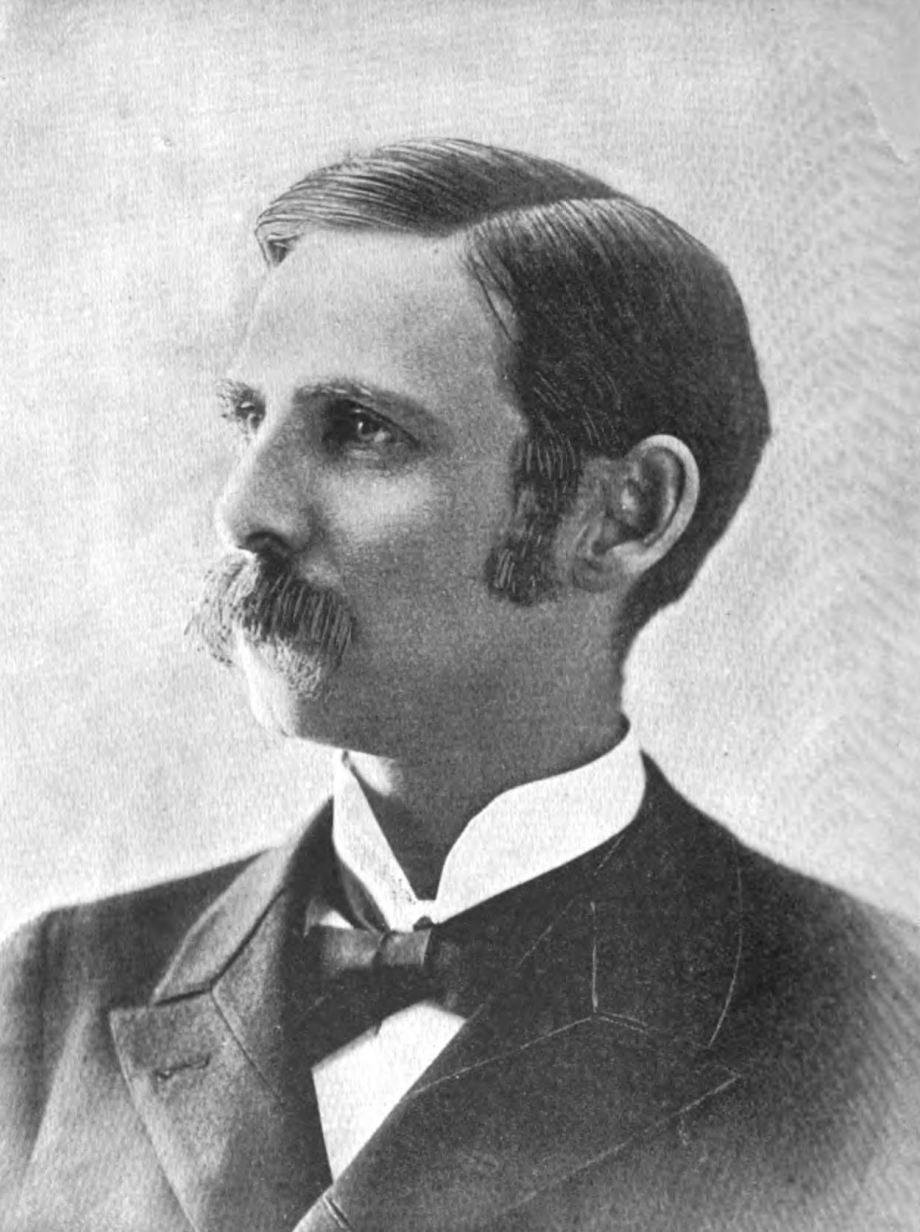

32nd Speaker of the Michigan House of Representatives
- In office January 7, 1891 – August 8, 1892
- Preceded by: Gerrit J. Diekema
- Succeeded by: William A. Tateum

Member of the Michigan House of Representatives from the Cheboygan district
- In office January 2, 1889 – 1894

Mayor of Petoskey
- In office April 2, 1900 – March 31, 1901
- Preceded by: Myron L. Barber
- Succeeded by: Eugene L. Rose

President of the Village of Petoskey
- In office 1885–1886
- Preceded by: William L. Curtis
- Succeeded by: Henry T. Calkins

Personal details
- Born: October 27, 1851 Centreville, Pennsylvania
- Died: November 14, 1913 (aged 62) Petoskey, Michigan
- Party: Democratic

Philip B. Wachtel (October 27, 1851 – November 14, 1913) was a Democratic politician from Michigan who served in the Michigan House of Representatives, including as Speaker of the House during the 36th Legislature. He also served, prior to his election to the House, as village president and later, after his service in the House, as mayor of Petoskey.

Wachtel was also the fusion Democrat-Greenback candidate for Michigan Secretary of State in 1886 and a Democratic candidate for the Michigan Senate in 1910.

Wachtel died on November 14, 1913, in Petoskey, Michigan.
