= Arthur Marsh (politician) =

American politician

Arthur F. Marsh was an American politician from the state of Michigan. Marsh was from Allegan and was Chairman of the Michigan Republican Party from 1898 to 1900.

Party political offices
Preceded by Dexter M. Ferry	Chairman of the Michigan Republican Party; 1898– 1900	Succeeded by Gerrit Diekema
