= Albert Sleeper =

American politician (1862–1934)

Albert Edson Sleeper
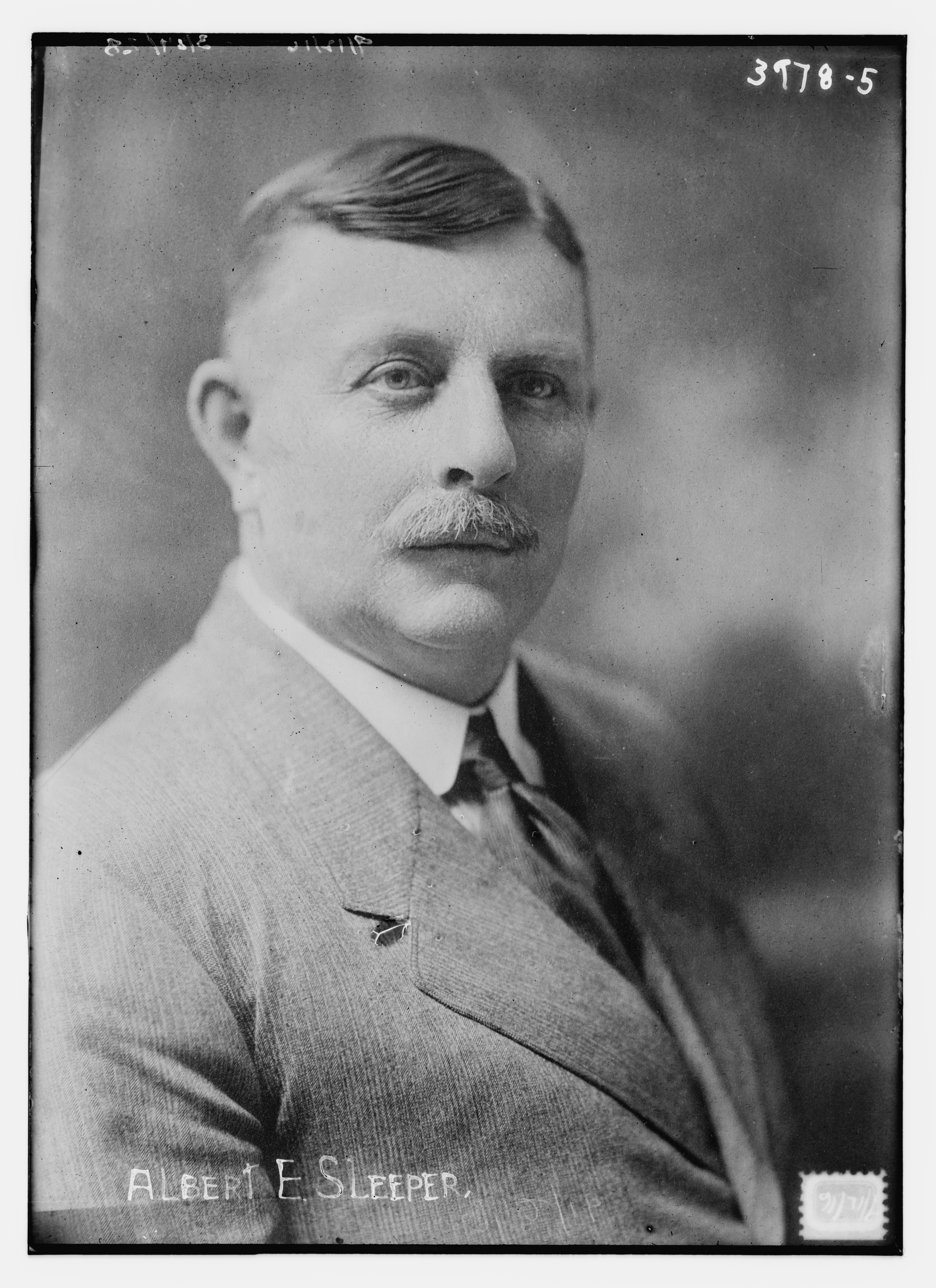
- Sleeper in 1916

29th Governor of Michigan
- In office January 1, 1917 – January 1, 1921
- Lieutenant: Luren D. Dickinson
- Preceded by: Woodbridge N. Ferris
- Succeeded by: Alex J. Groesbeck

Treasurer of Michigan
- In office 1909–1912
- Governor: Fred M. Warner; Chase Osborn
- Preceded by: John T. Rich
- Succeeded by: John W. Haarer

Member of the Michigan Senate from the 20th district
- In office January 1, 1901 – December 31, 1904
- Preceded by: Matthew D. Wagner
- Succeeded by: Bela W. Jenks

Personal details
- Born: December 31, 1862 Bradford, Vermont
- Died: May 13, 1934 (aged 71) Lexington, Michigan
- Party: Republican
- Spouse: Mary C. Moore

Albert Edson Sleeper (December 31, 1862 – May 13, 1934) was an American politician who served as the 29th governor of Michigan from 1917 to 1921.

== Biography ==
Sleeper was born on December 31, 1862, in Bradford, Vermont and was educated at the Bradford Academy.

In 1884, he moved to Lexington, Michigan, where he was a successful businessman owning several banks and extensive real estate. Sleeper also worked in mercantile industries. In 1901, he married Mary C. Moore.

Sleeper served in the Michigan State Senate, 1901–1904. The following year, he became a member of the Republican State Committee until 1907. Then he served as State Treasurer of Michigan from 1909 to 1913 under Governors, Fred M. Warner and Chase Osborn.

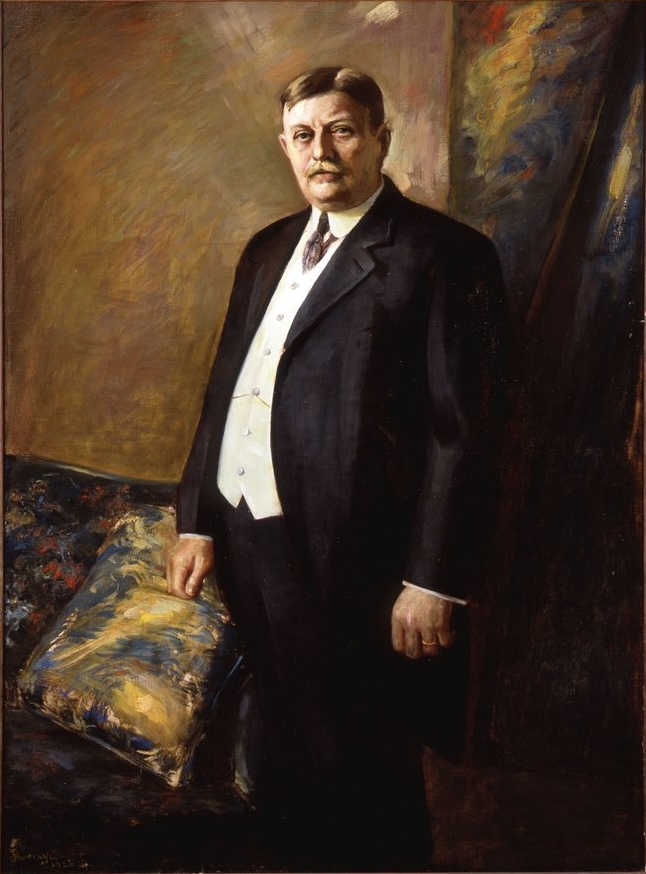
Official portrait by Edwin Murray MacKay, ca. 1920

Sleeper was elected Governor of Michigan by a popular vote on November 7, 1916, defeating Democrat Edwin F. Sweet. He was re-elected to a second term in 1918. He served during most of World War I and started measures to supply men, provisions, and arms for the war effort. Also during his four years in office, he established a department of animal husbandry, a department of labor, and a public utilities commission. He advanced a county road system; created a permanent state police department on April 19, 1917 and oversaw issuance of the first driver's license. Sleeper signed the State Parks Act creating the State Park system and also dealt with the 1918-1920 Spanish influenza epidemic.

In 1928, Sleeper served as a presidential elector for Michigan to elect Herbert Hoover as U.S. president. He died on May 13, 1934, in Bad Axe, Michigan, at age 71 and is interred at Lexington Municipal Cemetery.

== Legacy ==
In 1944, Huron State Park in Caseville, Michigan, was renamed Albert E. Sleeper State Park.The public library in Ubly, Michigan, is also named after Sleeper.

== Sources ==
- Biography at National Governors Association
- Political Graveyard
- Albert E. Sleeper State Park

Party political offices
| Preceded by Chase Osborn | Republican nominee for Governor of Michigan; 1916, 1918 | Succeeded by Alex J. Groesbeck |
Political offices
| Preceded by Woodbridge N. Ferris | Governor of Michigan; 1917–1921 | Succeeded by Alex J. Groesbeck |
| Preceded by John T. Rich | State Treasurer of Michigan; 1909-1912 | Succeeded by John W. Haarer |
