= 2025 Lansing mayoral election =

Election in Michigan, US

- November 4, 2025
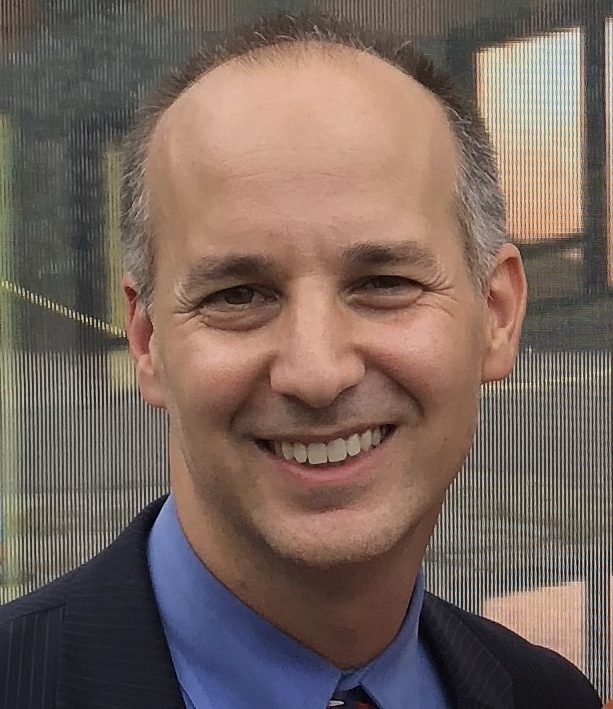

Candidate	Andy Schor	Kelsea Hector
Party	Nonpartisan	Nonpartisan
Popular vote	12,881	6,464
Percentage	66.6%	33.4%
Mayor before election
Andy Schor
Nonpartisan
Elected mayor
Andy Schor
Nonpartisan

The 2025 Lansing mayoral election was held on November 4, 2025 to elect the mayor of in Lansing, Michigan. Incumbent mayor Andy Schor was re-elected to a third term. Schor was first elected in 2017 and re-elected in 2021 as a Democrat. The primary election took place on August 5, and saw "the biggest turnout this century for a mayoral primary election."

In both the primary and the general, Schor placed first with around two-thirds of the vote.

== Primary election ==
=== Candidates ===
- Andy Schor, incumbent mayor (2018–present)
- Kelsea Hector, consultant and LGBT rights advocate
- Jeffrey Brown, at-large city councilor (2022–present)
- Brett Brockschmidt, retiree
- David Ellis, retail worker and urbanist advocate

=== Endorsements ===
Andy Schor

Executive branch officials

- Pete Buttigieg, 19th United States Secretary of Transportation (2021–2025)

U.S. senators

- Gary Peters, senior senator from Michigan (2015–present)
- Elissa Slotkin, junior senator from Michigan (2025–present)

Statewide officials

- Gretchen Whitmer, governor of Michigan (2019–present)

Labor unions

- ~~International Association of Fire Fighters Local 421~~ (Note: The Lansing Firefighters IAFF Local 421 rescinded their endorsement over concerns about healthcare coverage, but later endorsed Schor for the runoff election.)

Organizations

- Greater Lansing Association of Realtors
- Lansing Greater Chamber of Commerce

=== Results ===
Primary election results
Party	Candidate	Votes	%
Nonpartisan	Andy Schor (incumbent)	9,233	63.39%
Nonpartisan	Kelsea Hector	2,313	15.88%
Nonpartisan	Jeffrey Brown	1,228	8.43%
Nonpartisan	Brett Brockschmidt	1,105	7.59%
Nonpartisan	David Ellis	597	4.10%
Write-in		90	0.62%
Total votes		14,566	100.00%

== General election ==
=== Endorsements ===
Andy Schor

Labor unions

- International Association of Fire Fighters Local 421 (Note: Previously rescinded their endorsement in June 2025 over concerns about healthcare coverage, but re-endorsed Schor after his victory in the primary.)

Newspapers

- City Pulse

=== Results ===
General election results
Party	Candidate	Votes	%
Nonpartisan	Andy Schor (incumbent)	12,881	66.6%
Nonpartisan	Kelsea Hector	6,464	33.4%
Total votes		19,345	100.0%
