= 2013 Lansing mayoral election =

← 2009	November 5, 2013	2017 →
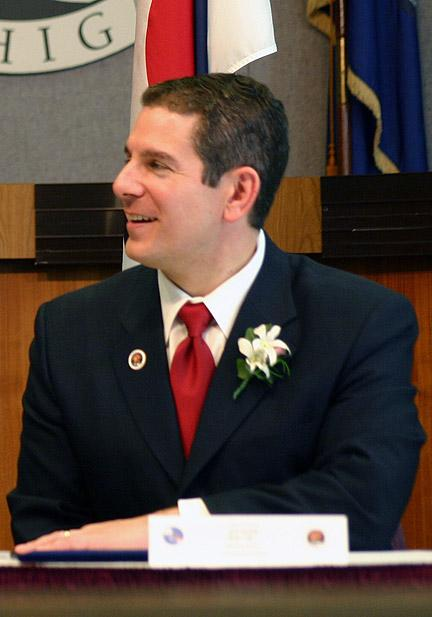

Candidate	Virgil Bernero	Harold J. Leeman, Jr.
Popular vote	9,863	3,864
Percentage	70.99%	27.81%
Mayor before election
Virgil Bernero
Nonpartisan
Elected mayor
Virgil Bernero
Nonpartisan

The 2013 Lansing mayoral election took place on November 5, 2013. A primary election took place on August 6, 2013, which narrowed the field of candidates for the general election. Incumbent Mayor Virgil Bernero, the unsuccessful Democratic nominee for Governor of Michigan in 2010, ran for re-election to a third term. His main challenger was former City Councilman Harold J. Leeman, Jr. Bernero placed first in the primary with 66 percent of the vote, and defeated Leeman by a landslide in the general election, winning his third and final term as Mayor with 71 percent of the vote

== Primary election ==
=== Candidates ===
- Virgil Bernero, incumbent Mayor
- Harold J. Leeman, Jr., former City Councilman
- Gene Gutierrez-Rodriguez, parenting time supervisor
- Donald A. Krepps, World War II veteran
- John Boise, handyman, grocery clerk, 2009 write-in candidate for Mayor

=== Results ===
2013 Lansing mayoral primary election results
Party	Candidate	Votes	%
Nonpartisan	Virgil Bernero (inc.)	4,585	65.86%
Nonpartisan	Harold J. Leeman, Jr.	1,180	16.95%
Nonpartisan	Gene Gutierrez-Rodriguez	471	6.77%
Nonpartisan	Donald A. Krepps	351	5.04%
Nonpartisan	John Boise	341	4.90%
Write-in		34	0.49%
Total votes		6,962	100.00%

== General election ==
=== Results ===
2013 Lansing mayoral general election results
Party	Candidate	Votes	%
Nonpartisan	Virgil Bernero (inc.)	9,863	70.99%
Nonpartisan	Harold J. Leeman, Jr.	3,864	27.81%
Write-in		166	1.19%
Total votes		13,893	100.00%
