= 2003 Lansing mayoral special election =

← 2001	November 4, 2003	2005 →

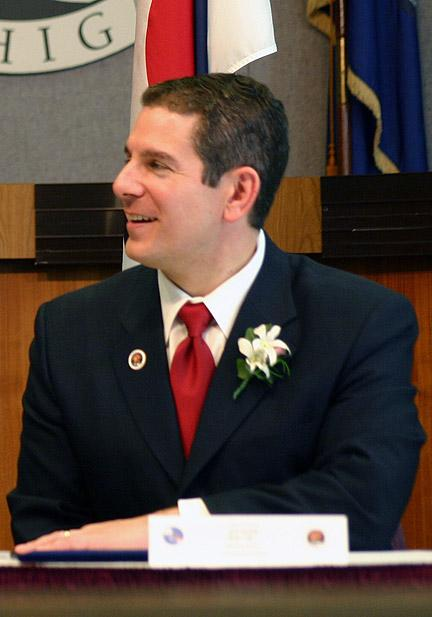
Candidate	Tony Benavides	Virgil Bernero
Party	Nonpartisan	Nonpartisan
Popular vote	11,789	11,531
Percentage	50.55%	49.45%
Mayor before election
Tony Benavides
Nonpartisan
Elected mayor
Tony Benavides
Nonpartisan

The 2003 Lansing special mayoral election was held on November 4, 2003, with a primary election that was held on August 5, 2003. Lansing Mayor David Hollister resigned on January 28, 2003, to serve as Director of the newly created Michigan Department of Labor and Economic Growth under Governor Jennifer Granholm, which elevated City Council President Tony Benavides as Mayor.

The special election was held to fill the remaining two years of Hollister's term. Benavides ran in the special election, and was initially challenged by State Representative Michael Murphy. However, prior to the filing deadline, Murphy withdrew from the race, initially leaving Benavides without a serious opponent. State Senator Virgil Bernero announced that he would run, and he emerged as Benavides's leading challenger. In the August 5 primary, Benavides placed first over Bernero by a wide margin, winning 56 percent of the vote to Bernero's 38 percent. In the November 4 general election, however, Benavides only narrowly defeated Bernero, 51–49 percent.

== Primary election ==
=== Candidates ===
- Tony Benavides, incumbent Mayor of Lansing
- Virgil Bernero, State Senator
- Melissa Sue Robinson, maintenance administrator, transgender rights advocate
- Leon J. Black, retired data systems analyst
- Mary Ann Prince, retired state employee
- Gerald J. Rowley, retired Michigan National Guard sergeant (dropped out)

=== Results ===
2003 Lansing mayoral primary election results
Party	Candidate	Votes	%
Nonpartisan	Tony Benavides (inc.)	6,668	56.31%
Nonpartisan	Virgil Bernero	4,506	38.05%
Nonpartisan	Melissa Sue Robinson	253	2.14%
Nonpartisan	Leon J. Black	170	1.44%
Nonpartisan	Mary Ann Prince	156	1.32%
Nonpartisan	Gerald J. Rowley	89	0.75%
Total votes		11,842	100.00%

== General election ==
=== Results ===
2003 Lansing mayoral general election results
Party	Candidate	Votes	%
Nonpartisan	Tony Benavides (inc.)	11,789	50.55%
Nonpartisan	Virgil Bernero	11,531	49.45%
Total votes		23,320	100.00%
