= 2005 Lansing mayoral election =

← 2003 (special)	November 8, 2005	2009 →
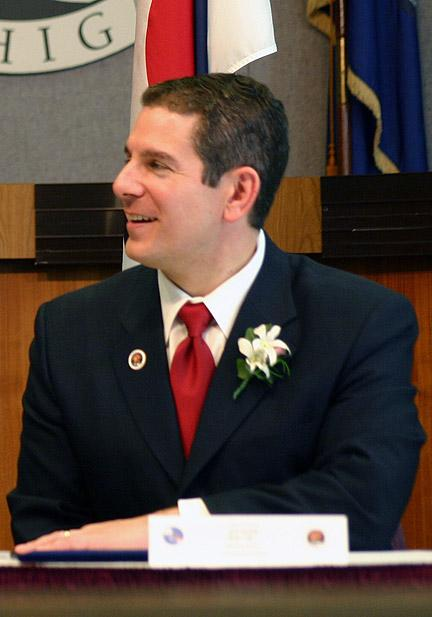

Candidate	Virgil Bernero	Tony Benavides
Popular vote	12,926	8,052
Percentage	61.62%	38.38%
Mayor before election
Tony Benavides
Nonpartisan
Elected mayor
Virgil Bernero
Nonpartisan

The 2005 Lansing mayoral election took place on November 8, 2005, with a primary election taking place on August 2, 2005. Incumbent Mayor Tony Benavides ran for re-election to a second term and a first full term. In a rematch of the 2003 special election, State Senator Virgil Bernero ran against Benavides. While Benavides narrowly defeated Bernero in 2003, Bernero defeated Benavides in a landslide this time, taking first place in the primary over Benavides, 46–27 percent, and winning the general election with 62 percent of the vote.

== Primary election ==
=== Candidates ===
- Virgil Bernero, State Senator, 2003 candidate for Mayor
- Tony Benavides, incumbent Mayor
- Lynne Martinez, Michigan Children's Ombudsman, former State Representative
- Dale M. Abronowitz, city maintenance worker

=== Results ===
2005 Lansing mayoral primary election results
Party	Candidate	Votes	%
Nonpartisan	Virgil Bernero	6,042	45.53%
Nonpartisan	Tony Benavides (inc.)	3,519	26.52%
Nonpartisan	Lynne Martinez	2,540	19.14%
Nonpartisan	Dale M. Abronowitz	1,158	8.73%
Write-in		12	0.09%
Total votes		13,271	100.00%

== General election ==
=== Results ===
2005 Lansing mayoral general election results
Party	Candidate	Votes	%
Nonpartisan	Virgil Bernero	12,926	61.62%
Nonpartisan	Tony Benavides (inc.)	8,052	38.38%
Total votes		20,978	100.00%
