= Michael C. Murphy =

Michael C. Murphy may refer to:

- Mike Murphy (trainer and coach) (Michael Charles Murphy, 1860–1913), trainer of boxing champion John L. Sullivan, first Michigan Wolverines football coach, and the "father of American track athletics"
- Michael C. Murphy (New York politician) (1839–1903), New York politician and Medal of Honor recipient
- Michael C. Murphy (Michigan politician) (1952–2014), member of the Michigan House of Representatives
