= The People's Temple =

The People's Temple may refer to:

- "The People's Temple", a 1998 Doctor Who short story by Paul Leonard in the first BBC Short Trips book; basis for the audio drama
- The People's Temple (band), an American garage rock band
- Peoples Temple, a religious organization founded by Jim Jones
