= 2017 Lansing mayoral election =

← 2013	November 7, 2017	2021 →
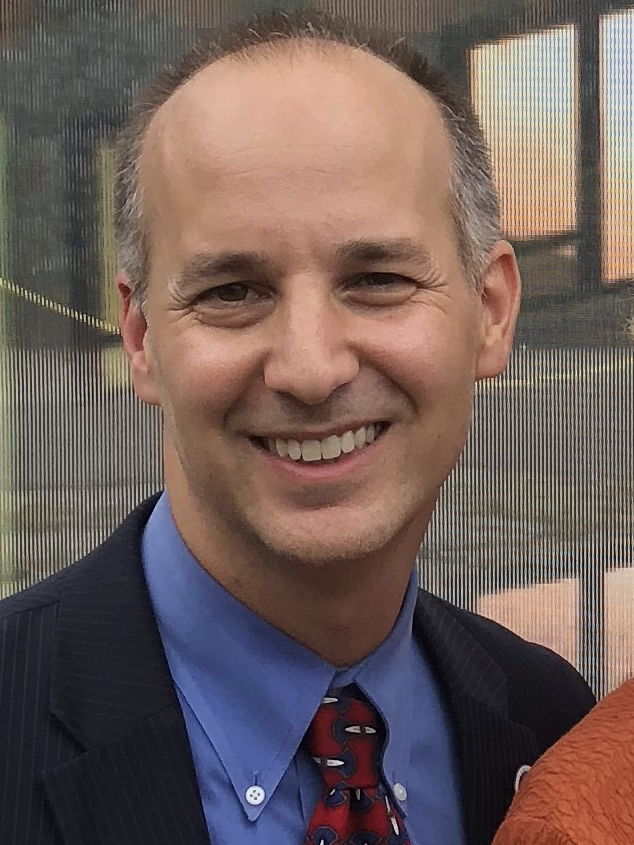

Candidate	Andy Schor	Judi Brown Clarke
Popular vote	12,407	4,804
Percentage	71.86%	27.83%
Mayor before election
Virgil Bernero
Nonpartisan
Elected mayor
Andy Schor
Nonpartisan

The 2017 Lansing mayoral election was held on November 7, 2017, following a primary election on August 8, 2017. Incumbent Mayor Virgil Bernero declined to seek a fourth term, and a crowded race developed to succeed him. State Representative Andy Schor placed first in the primary election by a wide margin, winning 68 percent of the vote, and he advanced to the general election with City Councilwoman Judi Brown Clarke, who won 23 percent of the vote. Schor ultimately defeated Clarke by a wide margin, winning 72 percent of the vote to Clarke's 28 percent.

== Primary election ==
=== Candidates ===
- Andy Schor, State Representative
- Judi Brown Clarke, City Councilwoman
- Danny Anthony Trevino, businessman
- Michael Joseph Gillenkirk, retired teacher
- Harold J. Leeman, Jr., former City Councilman, 2013 candidate for Mayor

=== Campaign ===
Mayor Virgil Bernero initially intended to seek re-election, and he faced likely opposition from State Representative Andy Schor and City Councilwoman Judi Brown Clarke. However, after Schor announced his candidacy, Bernero announced that he would not seek a fourth term, citing family considerations. Clarke announced her candidacy shortly thereafter.

Several other candidates joined the race prior to the filing deadline. When Danny Dario Trevino, the owner of a medical marijuana dispensary, was unable to run for office because of a previous felony conviction, he encouraged his 20-year-old son, Danny Anthony Trevino, to run in his place. Former City Councilman Harold Leeman, Jr., who unsuccessfully ran for Mayor in 2013 and was charged with embezzlement for stealing with a concession stand at a city park, announced his campaign for Mayor shortly after he was charged. Finally, retired teacher Michael Gillenkirk, who previously worked for the Michigan Chamber of Commerce and state Republican Party, also announced his candidacy.

=== Results ===
2017 Lansing mayoral primary election results
Party	Candidate	Votes	%
Nonpartisan	Andy Schor	8,402	68.22%
Nonpartisan	Judi Brown Clarke	2,874	23.34%
Nonpartisan	Danny Anthony Trevino	452	3.67%
Nonpartisan	Michael Gillenkirk	367	2.98%
Nonpartisan	Harold J. Leeman, Jr.	194	1.58%
Write-in		27	0.22%
Total votes		12,316	100.00%

== General election ==
=== Results ===
2017 Lansing mayoral general election results
Party	Candidate	Votes	%
Nonpartisan	Andy Schor	12,407	71.86%
Nonpartisan	Judi Brown Clarke	4,804	27.83%
Write-in		54	0.31%
Total votes		17,265	100.00%
