= 2009 Lansing mayoral election =

← 2005	November 3, 2009	2013 →
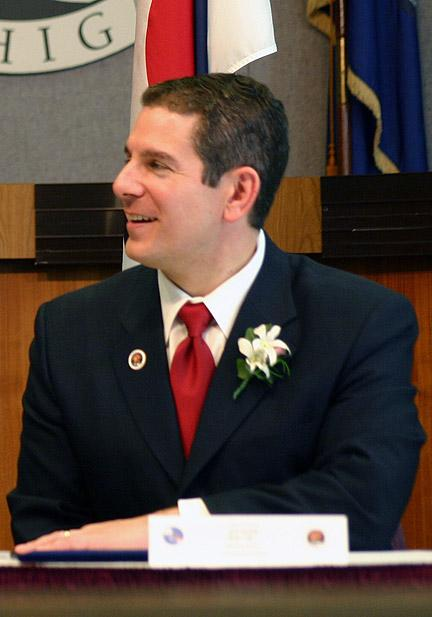

Candidate	Virgil Bernero	Carol Wood
Popular vote	9,990	5,980
Percentage	62.24%	37.25%
Mayor before election
Virgil Bernero
Nonpartisan
Elected mayor
Virgil Bernero
Nonpartisan

The 2009 Lansing mayoral election took place on November 3, 2009, with a primary election taking place on August 4, 2009. Incumbent Mayor Virgil Bernero ran for re-election to a second term. He was challenged by City Councilwoman Carol Wood and Charles Ford, a member of the Lansing Board of Education. Bernero placed first over Wood in the primary election, 44–38 percent, and then defeated Wood by a wide margin in the general election, winning 62–37 percent.

== Primary election ==
=== Candidates ===
- Virgil Bernero, incumbent Mayor
- Carol Wood, City Councilwoman
- Charles Ford, member of the Lansing Board of Education, former City Councilman
- Benjamin Hassenger, cook

=== Results ===
2009 Lansing mayoral primary election results
Party	Candidate	Votes	%
Nonpartisan	Virgil Bernero (inc.)	4,177	43.79%
Nonpartisan	Carol Wood	3,585	37.58%
Nonpartisan	Charles Ford	1,474	15.45%
Nonpartisan	Benjamin Hassenger	271	2.84%
Write-in		32	0.34%
Total votes		9,539	100.00%

== General election ==
=== Results ===
2009 Lansing mayoral general election results
Party	Candidate	Votes	%
Nonpartisan	Virgil Bernero (inc.)	9,990	62.24%
Nonpartisan	Carol Wood	5,980	37.25%
Total votes		16,052	100.00%
