= Joan Bauer =

Joan Bauer may refer to:

- Joan Bauer (novelist) (born 1951), American novelist
- Joan Bauer (politician) (born 1950), Michigan state representative
