= Andy Schor =

American politician

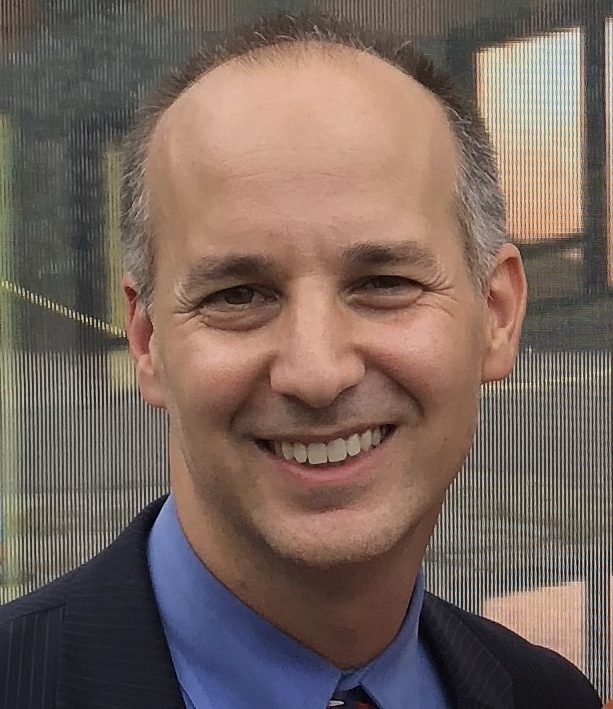

52nd Mayor of Lansing
- Incumbent
- Assumed office January 1, 2018
- Preceded by: Virg Bernero

Member of the Michigan House of Representatives from the 68th district
- In office January 1, 2013 – January 1, 2018
- Preceded by: Joan Bauer
- Succeeded by: Sarah Anthony

Member of the Ingham County Board of Commissioners from the 5th district
- In office January 1, 2003 – January 1, 2013
- Succeeded by: Todd Tennis

Personal details
- Born: March 20, 1975 (age 51) New York City, New York, U.S.
- Party: Democratic
- Spouse: Erin Schor
- Children: 2
- Education: University of Michigan (BA)

Andy Schor (born March 20, 1975) is an American politician currently serving as the 52nd mayor of Lansing, Michigan. A member of the Democratic Party, Schor was previously a member of the Ingham County Board of Commissioners. He also represented the 68th district in the Michigan House of Representatives, which includes most of the City of Lansing and all of Lansing Township. Schor is the first Jewish mayor of Lansing.

== Early life and education ==
Schor grew up in Long Island New York with his mother and father. His father found employment as a diamond distributor while his mother found work in a nursing home. Schor moved to Michigan to attend the University of Michigan, where he earned a Bachelor of Arts degree in Political Science and History. During his time at the University of Michigan, Schor took a semester off to be involved with the Clinton-Gore campaign his senior year as a paid staffer.

Schor served as a board member of the Tri-County Office of Aging and the South Lansing Community Development Association.

== Career ==
=== Ingham County Board of Commissioners (2003–2013) ===
Schor was elected to the Ingham County Board of Commissioners in 2002 and re-elected four times, serving through 2012.

Schor was among the members of the Board to create the Ingham County Land Bank in 2005.

In 2007, Schor supported a cost increase for Ingham County Sheriffs to patrol townships stating he believed that out-county communities should pay an additional fee for road patrol services that are provided. He echoed these remarks again in 2010 by saying that since road patrol is a service only received by out-county areas, Lansing residents shouldn’t pay for it.

Schor was supportive of a 2008 bill that would provide urban development areas with a 20% tax credit saying as "an incentive for more revitalization and redevelopment in urban areas".

=== Michigan Municipal League (2005–2012) ===
Schor has also worked as assistant director of state affairs for the Michigan Municipal League, as aide for then-State Senator Gary Peters and in the administration of former Governor Jennifer Granholm. During his bid for Mayor of Lansing in 2017, Schor reflected on this time by stating he learned a lot of what he knows about running a city from his time at the Michigan Municipal League. Schor remarks that this is where he demonstrated his understanding of cities economic development needs and he successfully advocated for several laws creating municipal economic development tools.

=== Michigan House of Representatives (2013–2018) ===
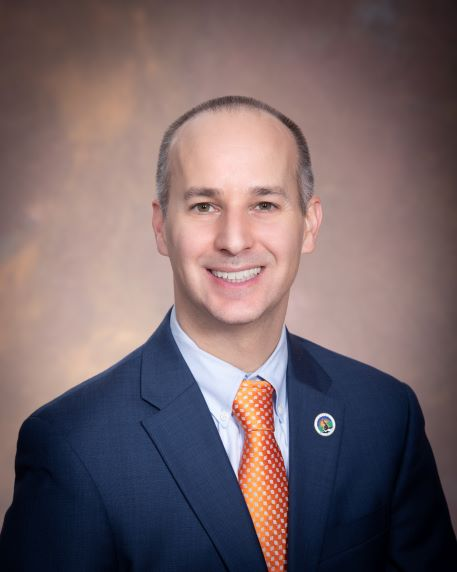

In the Michigan House of Representatives, Schor served as Minority Vice-Chair of the House Committee on Commerce and Trade, and as a member of the House Education, House Health Policy, House Michigan Competitiveness, House Elections and Ethics, and House Regulatory Reform committees. Schor regards that his proudest moment in the State House was the 2013 passage of the Healthy Michigan initiative, which was the state's version of Medicaid expansion under Obamacare. He talks about it as “the most important vote I made in my career," an initiative that led to more than 600,000 people signing on to the plan. Schor and state Rep. Kate Segal negotiated on behalf of the Democrats with the governor and Republicans in the House and Senate to see it passed.

On August 7, 2012, Schor won the Democratic Primary for State Representative 68th District with 3,142 votes, which was 43.19% of the vote total. On November 6, 2012, Schor won the general election against Republican candidate, Timothy Moede, who was a retired Lansing Fire Department battalion chief. Schor received 29,023 votes (76.18% of the vote total), to Moede’s 8,861 votes (23.26% of the vote total).

On November 4, 2014, Schor was re-elected State Representative of the 68th District, defeating Republican challenger Rob Secaur. Schor received 19,602 votes (76.91% of the vote total), to Secaur’s 5,884 votes (23.09% of the vote total).

In 2016, Schor chose to run for his third term as State Representative for the 68th District. This would be his last available two-year term in the State House per Article IV § 54 of the State Constitution, that limits the amount a state representative can be elected to no more than three times. On August 2, 2016, Schor won the Democratic Primary with 6,388 votes, which was 81% of the vote total. In the general election on November 8, 2016, Schor was re-elected for his final term, receiving 28,373 votes (72.88% of the vote total). He defeated Republican nominee Randy Pilon, who had received 8,365 votes (21.49% of the vote total), and Libertarian nominee Robert Powell, who had received 2,132 votes (5.48% of the vote total).

== Mayor of Lansing (2018–) ==
In 2016, there were rumors that Rep. Schor was considering running against current Lansing Mayor Virg Bernero in the upcoming election in 2017. Due to state legislative term limits, he had to leave the state House at the end of the 2018 session. Schor responded to the rumors stating that "If I run for mayor, it's because I want to be mayor, not because I need a job," he said. Schor added that he'd only want to be mayor if he concludes "it's best for the city."

In February 2017, Schor announced his primary run for mayor of Lansing. Around the same time, Mayor Bernero said in a press release that he was "prepared" to reapply for "my job" for a fourth term. A few days later, Bernero announced that he would not be seeking a fourth term so he can spend more time with his family. Schor transferred the balance of his state representative campaign committee into a committee for his run for mayor, having nearly $70,000 for campaign finance at the start of the campaign. In the 2017 primary election for mayor of Lansing, Schor and Judi Brown Clarke were the top two finishers over candidates Michael Joseph Gillenkirk, Harold J Leeman Jr, and Danny Trevino. Schor received 8,402 votes, which made up 68.37% of the primary votes. Schor and Brown Clarke, the top-two primary candidates, went on to face off in the general election.

In the mayoral election on November 9, 2017, Schor was elected mayor of Lansing, defeating Judi Brown Clarke, 72.2% to 27.8%. Brown Clarke, a former Olympic Silver medalist and a Lansing City Councilwoman received 4,804 votes compared to Schor’s 12,407 votes. Schor out-raised Brown Clarke by $68,215, raising $93,030 to Brown Clarke’s $23,815 that was primarily reliant on grassroots donations. The newly elected Mayor Schor, would go on to take office Jan 1, leaving his House seat vacant in 2018.

Schor was elected to serve as the city's first Jewish mayor.

In 2021, Schor ran for re-election, finishing as the top candidate in the primary election. Mayor Schor received 6,191 votes, pulling in nearly 50% of the primary vote. Lansing City Councilwoman Kathie Dunbar placed second in the primary, receiving 2,561 votes. Schor and Dunbar were the top two finishers over primary candidates Patricia Spitzley, Farhan Sheikh-Omar, Melissa Huber, and Larry James Hutchinson Jr. In the mayoral election on November 2, 2021, Schor was re-elected mayor of Lansing, defeating Kathie Dunbar with more than 64% of the total vote. Dunbar received 6,290 votes compared to Schor’s 11,328 votes. Mayor Schor is not up for re-election until 2025, and he has not yet publicly announced if he will seek a third term.

=== Appointments ===
In November 2017, then mayor-elect Schor announced his city hall appointments. He appointed Samantha Harkins as Chief of Staff, Jennifer LeFevre as Office Manager, Chelsea Coffey as Special Assistant to the Mayor, and Marilyn Plummer as Community Outreach Coordinator. Schor also appointed 12 members of his cabinet to oversee the city's departments, eight of whom worked for former Mayor Virg Bernero’s administration. Linda Sanchez Gazella as director of human resources, Andrew Kilpatrick as public service director, Angela Bennett remained overseer of the Finance Department, Collin Boyce remained chief information officer, Tammy Good remained treasurer, Joan Jackson-Johnson continued to head the Human Relations and Community Services Department, Brett Kaschinske continued as director of parks and recreation, Jim Smiertka continued as city attorney, Randy Talifarro continued as chief of the Lansing's Fire Department, Mike Yankowski continued to run the Lansing Police Department. Under Schor’s new plan, he split the Department of Planning and Neighborhood Development into two cabinet-level departments: one Economic Development and Planning, appointing Brian McGrain to oversee the department, the other Neighborhoods and Citizen Engagement, and appointed Andrea Crawford to run the new department.

In 2021, it was announced that Schor would appoint Darlene Fancher to the Capital Area Transportation Authority Board for a term that lasted until September 30, 2022, Gillian Dawson to the Elected Officers Compensation Commission for a term lasting until October 1, 2027, Thomas Patrick Morgan to the Planning Board for a term that would expire on June 30, 2024, and Samuel Brewster to the Police Board of Commissioners for a term lasting through 2024. Additionally, he announced multiple names for the Mayor’s Racial Justice and Equity Alliance including Brenda Henderson, Dr. Farhan Bhatti, Dr. Renee Canady, Dr. Fareeha Naz, Travis Harris, and Karen Tate. All of their terms expired on August 1, 2021. Schor also announced several new appointments for his upcoming term after winning reelection including Matthew Horwitt to the Board of Water and Light, Cordelia Black to a member of the Human Relations and Community Services as well as Andrew Abood to the Police Board of Commissioners. All terms will expire on June 30, 2025.

=== Marijuana policies ===
==== State representative ====
In 2017, as a Michigan state representative, Schor introduced bills that involved the advertisement of marijuana in Michigan. This bill, House Bill 4767 and Senate Bill 463 would ban billboard advertisements for medical marijuana and dispensaries and other businesses that involve marijuana. Schor was quoted as saying that Michigan doesn’t “need massive marijuana billboard advertising the availability of medical marijuana or to find shops, and shouldn’t be advertising this to our children and others who may abuse it”.

==== Mayor ====
A proposal announced by Mayor Schor in June 2020 would change the number of marijuana retailers from 25 to 28. The changes an amendment to the city of Lansing's ordinance to add recreational marijuana to the kinds of marijuana businesses allowed in Lansing. In an interview for the Lansing City Pulse in 2018, the interviewer discusses how the city of Lansing faced an ordinance problem that limited the amount of dispensaries that were allowed to be in business. In the time before he was mayor there was an ordinance that only allowed a certain number of marijuana dispensaries within city limits.

=== COVID-19 ===
As a response to the rapid spread of the COVID-19 virus in March 2020, Schor released an internal COVID-19 mitigation plan in order to slow the spread of the disease. This plan suspended nonessential business travel outside of Clinton, Ingham and Eaton County, employees that present any COVID symptoms are expected to remain home, as well as departments providing supplies such as gloves, hand sanitizer, disinfectant wipes, as well as tissues.

In March 2022, Andy Schor tested positive for Covid-19. Schor got his COVID-19 vaccination in January 2021, at Sparrow Hospital in Lansing. He was able to receive an early vaccine, and was one of two-hundred that were given early access to the vaccine.

=== Climate change ===
In April 2020, Andy Schor created the job of Sustainability Manager for the city of Lansing. To this position, Schor appointed former environmental specialist, Lori Welch, to the newly created position. The purpose of this position is to implement sustainability plans and to create more environmentally focused strategies for the city of Lansing.

=== Police ===
In May 2021, Schor called for an independent review of the Police Department of Lansing, asking for assessments of their use of force, de-escalation strategies, officer wellness, arrest management, as well as body cameras and police bias. This was in response to widespread public protests nationwide concerning the trial of Derek Chauvin, in which he was found guilty in the murder of George Floyd.

In 2021, Schor released the Mayor's Report on Racial Justice and Equity. This document acted as an outline to steps to work towards a higher level of racial justice within the Lansing police department. These steps included Schor signing the “8cantwait pledge”, Obama’s Mayoral Pledge, as well as adjusting Lansing Police Departments policing policies regarding traffic stops and “no knock” searches. The “8cantwait pledge” bans certain policing procedures such as strangling and choke holding individuals.

In 2021, Lansing police counted 45 homicides, 112 non-fatal shootings and more than 1,000 gunshot reports over the last two years and city officials pointed the blame largely toward an influx of illegal firearms. At the end of the year, Mayor Schor announced a plan to hire five more officers and an additional social worker at the Police Department, and that they had launched a gun violence task force.

=== Gun legislation ===
==== State representative ====
In 2013, Rep. Schor introduced House Bill 4104 that would have closed the loophole in Michigan's gun law that allows a concealed weapons license holder to openly carry a gun in gun-free zones such as schools, churches, daycares, and more. The bill would have also added public libraries as a part of the “gun free zone” provision of the concealed pistol permit law, something that was added in response to several incidents of individuals openly carrying guns in the Capital Area District Library’s downtown branch. Schor's bill didn’t make it out of committees under the Republican House majority.

Rep. Schor, a gun owner himself, said "I support all of our citizens' right to keep and bear arms, but I also ... feel strongly about ensuring that concealed and open-carry guns are not allowed in very sensitive areas."

==== Mayor ====
In 2022, Schor implemented an ordinance that required owners of firearms to report stolen guns in the city to the Lansing Police Department. The failure of an owner to not report the theft of a firearm is a civil infraction and is subject to a fine of up to $500. Schor justified the ordinance by saying “Illegal guns on our streets have had a devastating effect on so many lives in our community.”

=== Education ===
==== State representative ====
As a State Representative, Schor supported "talent retention," encouraging recent graduates from state-supported colleges and universities to stay and work in the state of Michigan. In 2013, he introduced House Bill 4182, which would have provided tax credits on student loan payments for recent graduates from Michigan universities or colleges, including two-year institutions. Schor proposed House Bill 4844, which would have allowed school districts to start their school year before Labor Day, but also mandate to take Labor Day as well as the proceeding Friday off. In 2013, Schor also spearheaded House Bill 4982 that would have allowed for the transition of Michigan schools to move to a year-round schedule. Schor advocated for the year-round schedule as he believes that vital information is forgotten during the three months off of school.

His proposed bill would create a fund of ten million dollars, that at-risk districts that want to convert to all year system can have access to, to help them achieve this. This bill would help incentivize Michigan schools to move to the year round system. This money would help schools prepare for summer months because many schools lack proper air conditioning that is needed for summer schooling. Due to the full Republican control of the State House, State Senate, and Governors seat at the time, all three of these bills died in committee.

==== Mayor ====
Mayor Schor's children both attend Lansing Schools, and he has been a vocal booster and supporter for the school district. As mayor, Schor has tried to draw positive attention to the schools and work on increasing attendance and support for young families moving into the city.

In response to gun violence in the city, Schor rolled out several grant-funding opportunities to help create more afterschool activities. In 2021, the city partnered with school district officials, opened up community centers and pledged more than $250,000 toward a gun violence intervention program in 2022, to combat the rise in teenage homicides in the city.

In August 2022, Mayor Schor announced a $400,000 pledge of American Rescue Plan money over the next two years to be used to help students finish high school. This investment is intended to create a stronger relationship between the Lansing School District and the City of Lansing.

=== Homelessness ===
Schor has argued that the persistence of the homelessness problem in Lansing is a result of insufficient social safety nets. Schor claims that substance abuse plays a major role in this equation and that homeless shelters do not have adequate means of providing a solution for that issue. Additionally, Schor has advocated for putting the homeless in apartments and providing them with resources such as healthcare and education.

In 2019, the city accepted President Barack Obama's 2014 "Mayor's Challenge to End Veteran Homelessness," working with federal agencies to reduce the number of homeless veterans within the city. Under the Schor administration, the city saw a 64% reduction in homelessness veterans in a year, with city services put in place to help them.

In December 2020, Schor endorsed the clearance of Lansing’s “Back 40” homeless encampment due to unsanitary living conditions. This was done on the condition that the city’s top priority was to “provide safe living conditions and avoid tragedy” for the individuals previously staying at the camp. The city of Lansing provided grants totaling 1.8 million dollars to four different agencies to help the homeless or near homeless find housing.

=== Development ===
==== State representative ====
As a State Representative, Schor introduced a few pieces of legislation that boosted the flexibility and growth of breweries in Michigan. Schor regards that "these bills are another attempt to create more jobs and support growth in what has become one of our state's great local industries," and that "Our craft brewery industry is hugely important for economic development here in Michigan." One of the pieces of legislation that was signed into law, HB 4711, allows brewers to sell their beer for on-premise consumption at two brewery locations instead of one, with the intent of breweries and microbreweries having more opportunities to expand in Michigan.

In 2017, Rep. Schor introduced House Bill 4207, which aimed to incentivize the development of grocery stores in underserved cities. The bill allocated grant funding to help create new neighborhood grocery stores in underserved urban areas or to help redevelop existing neighborhood grocery stores. This bipartisan bill was signed into law by Gov. Rick Snyder.

== Electoral history ==
=== Michigan State Legislature ===
2012 Michigan State House's 68th District Election
Democratic Primary Election
Party	Candidate	Votes	%
Democratic	Andy Schor	3,142	43.19
Democratic	A'Lynne Robinson	1,340	18.42
Democratic	Griffin Rivers	979	13.46
Democratic	Dale Copedge	958	13.17
Democratic	Anne Clayton	337	4.63
Democratic	Harold J. Leeman Jr.	335	4.60
Democratic	Ted O'Dell	176	2.42
Other	Write-In	8	0.11
Total votes		7,275	100.00
General Election
Party	Candidate	Votes	%
Democratic	Andy Schor	29,023	76.18
Republican	Timothy Moede	8,861	23.26
Other	Write-In	213	0.56
Total votes		38,097	100.00

2014 Michigan State House's 68th District Election
Democratic Primary Election
Party	Candidate	Votes	%
Democratic	Andy Schor	5,808	100.00
Total votes		5,808	100.00
General Election
Party	Candidate	Votes	%
Democratic	Andy Schor	19,602	76.91
Republican	Rob Secaur	5,884	23.09
Total votes		25,486	100.00

2016 Michigan State House's 68th District Election
Democratic Primary Election
Party	Candidate	Votes	%
Democratic	Andy Schor	6,388	81.00
Democratic	Chris G. Davenport	760	9.64
Democratic	Eric Nelson	707	8.97
Other	Write-In	31	0.39
Total votes		7,886	100.00
General Election
Party	Candidate	Votes	%
Democratic	Andy Schor	28,373	72.88
Republican	Randy Pilon	8,365	21.49
Libertarian	Robert Powell	2,132	5.48
Other	Write-In	62	0.16
Total votes		38,932	100.00

=== Mayor of Lansing ===
2017 Lansing mayoral election
Primary Election
Candidate	Votes	%
Andy Schor	8,402	68.37
Judi Brown Clarke	2,874	23.39
Danny Trevino	452	3.68
Michael Joseph Gillenkirk	367	2.99
Harold J Leeman Jr.	194	1.58
Total votes	12,289	100.0
General Election
Candidate	Votes	%
Andy Schor	12,407	72.2
Judi Brown Clarke	4,804	27.8
Total votes	17,211	100.0

2021 Lansing mayoral election
Primary Election
Candidate	Votes	%
Andy Schor	6,191	48.98
Kathie Dunbar	2,561	20.26
Patricia Spitzley	2,067	16.35
Farhan Sheikh-Omar	1,074	8.50
Melissa Huber	537	4.25
Larry James Hutchinson Jr.	211	1.67
Total votes	12,641	100.0
General Election
Candidate	Votes	%
Andy Schor	11,328	64.30
Kathie Dunbar	6,290	35.70
Total votes	17,618	100.0

Political offices
Preceded by Virg Bernero	Mayor of Lansing; 2018–present	Incumbent
