= The People's Temple (band) =

Peoples Temple
- Origin: Lansing, Michigan
- Genres: Garage rock, garage punk, psychedelic rock, shoegazing
- Instruments: vocals, guitar, bass, drums, Harmonica
- Years active: 2007–2016
- Labels: Hozac Records; Third Man Records; State Capital Records; Certified PR Records; Milk-n-Herpes Records; Agitated Records
- Past members: Alex Szegedy; George Szegedy; Spencer Young; William Young

The People's Temple was an American garage rock band that formed in 2007 in Perry, Michigan, and later based out of Lansing. In February 2013 Third Man Records released "Never More," a 7-inch single recorded live at Third Man in Nashville.

In a June 6, 2013 emusic "10 Bands to Watch" article, writer and guitarist Lenny Kaye wrote his thoughts on the band's "More for the Masses" LP: "Awash in reverb and mood enhancers, the People's Temple create an atmosphere truly "Texas Revisited," embracing trippy International Artists like the Red Kraola and Bubble Puppy, bone-shaking a tambourine ("Nevermore," "Looter's Game"), and mumbo-jumboing poetics ("House of Fools"). Alternately soaring, dislocating, unsettling and uplifting, the album culminates in the phantasmagoria of "(Dark Dreams) Distant Memories," a hymn to the glories found in a millisecond's delay by way of Jane's Addiction. Pass the Kool-Aid," Kaye wrote.

In February 2014 the band released "Musical Garden" on HoZac Records, it received positive reviews from a number of outlets, including Pitchfork Media. In September it released its second full-length of 2014 when it released "Weekends Time" via State Capital Records. The album is the band's fourth LP and was recorded live in the studio over a three-day period.

The group parted ways in 2016. The first solo project from a band member, Crystal Drive, arrived in April 2018. It is the debut LP from drummer George Szegedy.

== History ==
The People's Temple was formed in 2007 by two sets of brothers: Alex Szegedy (guitar/vocals) and George Szegedy (drums) and Spencer Young (bass/vocals) and William Young (guitar/vocals).

While growing up in Perry, MI the band members became influenced by 1960s rock, folk, and garage rock, which shows in the band's vintage sound.

The band started playing gigs in the Lansing area in 2008 and have since developed a reputation of performing wild stage shows, with ample guitar feedback. The band has 7-inch EPs on Certified PR Records, Milk-n-Herpes Records and HoZac Records. Their debut LP "Sons of Stone" was released in May 2011 by HoZac Records. The album received positive reviews from Pitchfork Media, as well as Uncut Magazine and the Los Angeles Times.

On July 13, 2012, the People's Temple recorded a live set at Third Man Records in Nashville for a 7-inch split single with King Tuff. The event was an early show dubbed "The Rock N Roll Lunch at Third Man."

In October 2012 the band released "More For the Masses," its second full-length album. This album was also released on HoZac Records.

Third Man released the "Never More" / "Miles Away" live 7-inch on February 26, 2013. It was released alongside a single by Hell Beach. The official Third Man Records site said this about the bands: "Two incredible live 45s, recorded here in our venue direct-to-tape, housed in our distinctive Live series die cut sleeves. People's Temple and Hell Beach are two of the most intriguing and rawkus bands currently blowing up the rock-n-roll underground and these live 45s catch them at full speed."

In early 2014 HoZac Records released the band's third album, Musical Garden. The LP was a collection of random tracks the band recorded over the past year. Pitchfork gave the album a positive review, stating: "Thus far, they're three for three and show no signs of letting up." In September, the band released its second album of 2014 when it released "Weekends Time" on State Capital Records. The disc includes originals and two Ariel Pink covers. Pitchfork gave it a positive review, stating: "Not to say they've gotten "better", but their echoing desert psych days might be behind them, as their new one sounds like it's sprung from the melodic wheelhouse of Ric Ocasek and Dwight Twilley. It's a new frontier for this band—a damn catchy one, at that. This is the sort of record that makes me want to put on everything they've released, in chronological order, to hear their progression, and then wonder where they'll go next."

== Influences ==
The People's Temple have cited Big Star, Chris Bell, Arthur Lee, The Smiths, Spacemen 3, 13th Floor Elevators, The Velvet Underground, The Rolling Stones, Joy Division, James Gang, and Link Wray as main influences.

== Crystal Drive ==
In 2018, George Szegedy of People's Temple, under the name Crystal Drive, released his debut, self-titled solo album. Unlike the 1960s-inspired Peoples Temple, Crystal Drive puts the synthesizers up front delivers more of a moody yet poppy new-wave sound.The album was issued on white and blue vinyl by Jett Plastic Recordings, a Detroit-based label, on April 20, 2018. The self-produced, (mostly) self-performed LP was praised by AllMusic pop critic Mark Deming, who said: "His tunes are solid and boast hooks that are smart and imaginative as they point to influences from the Cars to Ultravox ... And while keyboards and electronics are at the forefront of these tracks, Szegedy’s drumming gives the music a pulse that’s steady but human, and this album has warmth that sets it apart from other folks trying to evoke the Era of Many Keyboards."

Meanwhile, Lansing City Pulse gave the LP a positive review, stating: Crystal Drive is closer to Roxy Music’s 'More Than This' than it is The Car’s 'Just What I Needed.' It’s Gary Numan in his Tubeway Army days, before he was just a one hit wonder. The single '900' particularly impresses with its lush soundscapes and an earworm of a chorus, while 'The Scanner' makes one wonder why Crystal Drive isn’t booked for Europe’s biggest musical festivals."

== Discography ==
- Outta My Hands 7-inch EP (Milk n Herpes Records, September 2009, HERP011) - 350 copies.
- You Don't Know (Just Where I've Been) 7-inch EP (Certified PR Records, March 2010, CPR009) - 500 copies (w/ 50 limited edition magnets).
- Make You Understand 7-inch EP (HoZac Records, May 2010, HZR056) - 500 copies.
- Still (The Same) 7-inch EP (Goodbye Boozy Records, June 2011, GB 63) - 270 copies (Hand-numbered).
- Sons of Stone LP/CD (HoZac Records, May 2011, HZR085). 200 copies on gold vinyl. 550 copies on black vinyl.
- "Looters Game" 7-inch single (HoZac Records, August 2012, HZR121) - 200 copies on gold vinyl. 475 copies on black vinyl.
- More For the Masses LP/CD (HoZac Records, October 2012, HZR122). 199 copies on gold vinyl. 500 copies on black vinyl.
- "Never More" live 7-inch (Third Man Records, February 2013).
- "Brand New Thing" 7-inch single (Trouble in Mind Records, September 2013, TIM054). 500 copies on various colored vinyl.
- Musical Garden LP/CD (HoZac Records, Feb. 2014, HZR-146) 199 on Gold vinyl. 500 copies on black vinyl.
- Utopia 7-inch EP (Agitated Records, May 6, 2014, IMSO010.) 500 copies UK release only.
- Weekends Time LP/CD (State Capital Records, Sept. 2014) 50 Limited colored vinyl and 250 pressed on black vinyl.
