= 2021 Lansing mayoral election =

- November 2, 2021
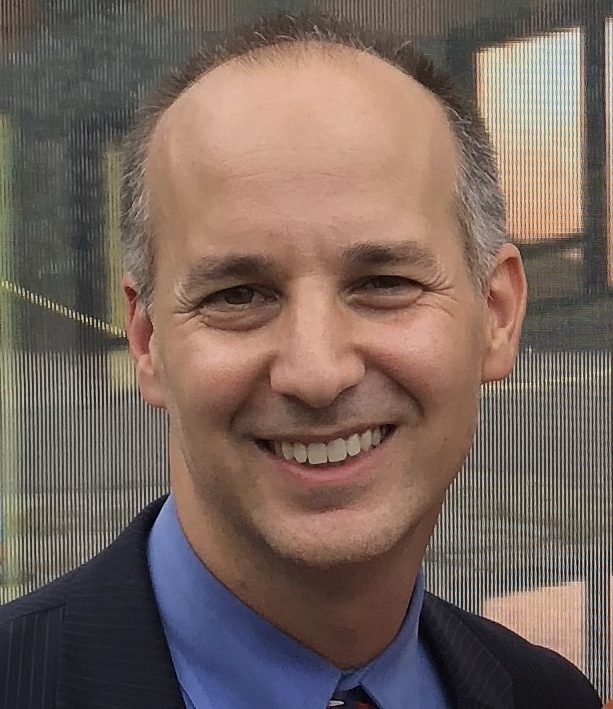

| Candidate | Andy Schor | Kathie Dunbar |
| Party | Nonpartisan | Nonpartisan |
| Popular vote | 11,328 | 6,290 |
| Percentage | 64.28% | 35.69% |
Mayor before election
Andy Schor
Nonpartisan
Elected mayor
Andy Schor
Nonpartisan

The 2021 Lansing mayoral election was held on November 2, 2021, following a primary election on August 3, 2021. Incumbent Mayor Andy Schor ran for re-election to a second term. Schor originally faced a challenge from former Mayor Virgil Bernero, but following allegations of sexual harassment against Bernero, he dropped out of the race. Instead, Schor was challenged by two members of the City Council: Kathie Dunbar and Patricia Spitzley. Schor placed first in the primary election with 49 percent of the vote and advanced to the general election against Dunbar, who received 20 percent. Schor ended up defeating Dunbar by a wide margin, winning re-election 64–36 percent.

== Primary election ==
=== Candidates ===
- Andy Schor, incumbent Mayor
- Kathie Dunbar, City Councilmember
- Patricia Spitzley, City Councilmember
- Farhan Sheikh-Omar, activist
- Melissa Huber, community psychologist
- Larry James Hutchinson, Jr., perennial candidate

==== Dropped out ====
- Virgil Bernero, former Mayor

=== Campaign ===
Schor announced that he would seek a second term, arguing that he had helped deliver "inclusive growth" for the city. Schor was originally set to face former Mayor Virgil Bernero, who served from 2006 to 2018. Bernero announced that he would challenge Schor on January 31, 2021, saying that the city needed "bold, decisive leadership." However, just before MLive was scheduled to publish a story containing allegations of sexual harassment against Bernero, he dropped out of the race.

Following Bernero's withdrawal from the race, two city council members, Kathie Dunbar and Patricia Spitzley, emerged as Schor's most serious challengers. Shortly after she announced her candidacy, Dunbar faced allegations from a former friend that she had "made racist comments and multiple unwanted sexual advances toward her." Dunbar denied making sexual advances, but acknowledged that "15 years ago I said and did things I wouldn't say today," and apologized. During the campaign, Dunbar was involved in a serious car crash with another driver for which she was determined to be at fault, with officers determining that Dunbar "disregard[ed] traffic control" by running a red light. After the crash, Dunbar blacked out during a virtual candidate forum, which she attributed to the crash.

The mayoral election took place in the aftermath of the George Floyd protests during the summer of 2020, in which the Lansing Police Department controversially deployed tear gas at a protest after property damage occurred. Prior to the start of the campaign, Black Lives Matter of Lansing urged Black leaders in the community to oppose Schor and to "acknowledge the harm perpetrated by Andy Schor and his administration." Dunbar, activist Farhan Sheikh-Omar, and community psychologist Melissa Huber called for a reduction in the Lansing Police Department's budget, while Schor and Spitzley supported reform.

Ultimately, Schor placed first in the primary, winning 49 percent of the vote, with Dunbar outpacing Spitzley for second place, 20–16%.

=== Results ===
2021 Lansing mayoral primary election
| Party | Candidate | Votes | % |
|---|---|---|---|
| Nonpartisan | Andy Schor (inc.) | 6,191 | 48.91% |
| Nonpartisan | Kathie Dunbar | 2,561 | 20.23% |
| Nonpartisan | Patricia Spitzley | 2,067 | 16.33% |
| Nonpartisan | Farhan Sheikh-Omar | 1,074 | 8.49% |
| Nonpartisan | Melissa Huber | 537 | 4.24% |
| Nonpartisan | Larry James Hutchinson Jr. | 211 | 1.67% |
| Write-in | | 16 | 0.13% |
| Total votes | | 12,657 | 100.00% |

== General election ==
=== Campaign ===
In the general election, Schor was seen as the frontrunner, raising and spending ten times more than Dunbar and enjoying wider name recognition. Schor emphasized his experience and leadership skills, while Dunbar noted that she "ha[s] the municipal government experience" and "this incredible grassroots connection to the community." Ultimately, Schor defeated Dunbar in a landslide, winning re-election with 64 percent of the vote.

=== Results ===
2021 Lansing mayoral general election results
| Party | Candidate | Votes | % |
|---|---|---|---|
| Nonpartisan | Andy Schor (inc.) | 11,328 | 64.28% |
| Nonpartisan | Kathie Dunbar | 6,290 | 35.69% |
| Write-in | | 4 | 0.02% |
| Total votes | | 17,622 | 100.00% |
