= 2010 Michigan gubernatorial election =

- November 2, 2010
- Turnout: 42.9% ▼7.8
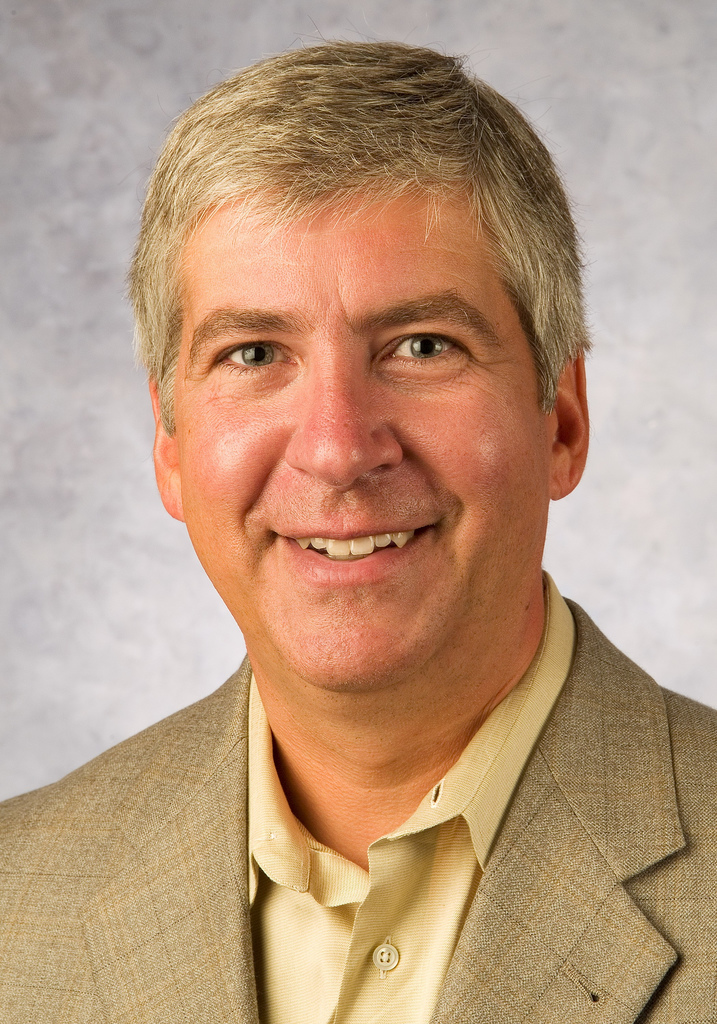

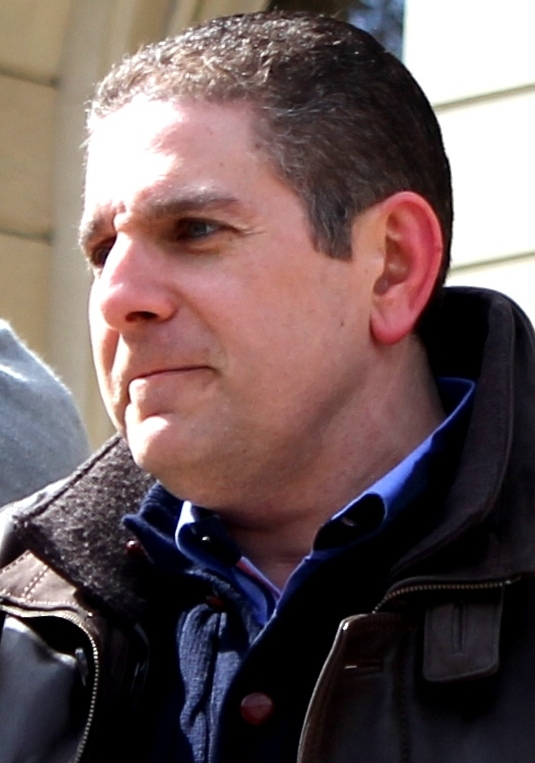
Nominee	Rick Snyder	Virg Bernero
Party	Republican	Democratic
Running mate	Brian Calley	Brenda Lawrence
Popular vote	1,874,834	1,287,320
Percentage	58.11%	39.90%
- Synder: 40–50% 50–60% 60–70% 70–80% 80–90% 90%+ Bernero: 40–50% 50–60% 60–70% 70–80% 80–90% 90%+ Tie: 40–50%
Governor before election
Jennifer Granholm
Democratic
Elected Governor
Rick Snyder
Republican

The 2010 Michigan gubernatorial election was held on November 2, 2010. Incumbent Democratic Governor Jennifer Granholm and Lieutenant Governor John D. Cherry were prohibited by the state's Constitution from seeking a third term. This resulted in a large pool of candidates, which was whittled down, when the May 11 filing deadline passed, to two Democrats and five Republicans. Both the Cook Political Report and the non-partisan Rothenberg Political Report rated the election as leaning Republican.

The Republican primary race was highly competitive; both local and national polling reported Congressman Pete Hoekstra, state Attorney General Mike Cox, and businessman Rick Snyder as being front-runners for the Republican Party nomination. The Democratic front-runner when the 2009 polls were conducted, Lieutenant Governor John D. Cherry, withdrew from the race in January 2010. The final polls just days before the primary election showed that, while Lansing mayor Virg Bernero was in the lead, over a quarter of those polled were still undecided. The deadline for candidates to file nominating petitions for the August 3 state primary was 4:00 PM on May 11, 2010.

A total of 1,575,167 registered voters voted in the primaries, with 66.4% of them voting in the Republican primary. Analysts believe a large portion of Democrats crossed party lines to vote for Snyder, whose ad campaign targeted bipartisan and independent support. In Michigan, voters may vote in either primary regardless of their political affiliation, but can only vote for one party. Ballots with split tickets are not counted in partisan races. Both races came in more disparate than predicted. Snyder won with a near 10-point lead over closest rival Pete Hoekstra, and Bernero won with an even larger 17-point lead over early favorite state house speaker Andy Dillon. Both nominees portrayed themselves as political outsiders. On August 25, Snyder appointed State Representative Brian Calley as his running mate. On August 28, Bernero appointed Southfield Mayor Brenda Lawrence as his running mate.

Snyder won a decisive victory over Bernero in the general election, winning by nearly 20 percentage points. As of 2022, this was the last time the counties of Ingham, Marquette, Eaton, Saginaw, Bay, and Muskegon voted for the Republican candidate.

== Democratic primary ==
=== Candidates ===
==== Declared ====
- Virg Bernero, mayor of Lansing
- Andy Dillon, speaker of the Michigan House of Representatives

==== Withdrew ====
- Robert Bowman, former Michigan treasurer (ended exploratory bid on February 15, 2010)
- John D. Cherry, lieutenant governor (ended exploratory bid on January 5, 2010)
- Hansen Clarke, member of the Michigan Senate (ended bid on January 15, 2010; ran for Congress instead)
- John Freeman, former member of the Michigan House of Representatives (ended bid on January 11, 2010)
- Dan Kildee, former Genesee County treasurer (ended exploratory bid on March 5, 2010)
- Alma Wheeler Smith, member of the Michigan House of Representatives (ended exploratory bid on May 10, 2010)
- Geoffrey Fieger, attorney and nominee for governor in 1998

=== Endorsements ===
Virg Bernero

U.S. representatives

- John Conyers, U.S. representative for Michigan's 14th congressional district (1965–2017)
- Carolyn Cheeks Kilpatrick, U.S. representative for Michigan's 13th congressional district (1997-2011)

Organizations

- AFSCME
- Michigan Clean Water Action
- Michigan Education Association
- Michigan League of Conservation Voters
- Sierra Club Michigan Chapter
- United Auto Workers

=== Polling ===
Poll source	Dates administered	John D. Cherry	Andy Dillon	George Perles	John Freeman	Alma Wheeler Smith	Dan Kildee	Virg Bernero
EPIC-MRA	July 28, 2010	--	32%	--	--	--	--	40%
EPIC-MRA	June 12–15, 2010	--	34%	--	--	--	--	24%
Public Policy Polling	May 25–27, 2010	--	23%	--	--	--	--	26%
EPIC-MRA	May 22–26, 2010	--	29%	--	--	--	--	23%
Rasmussen Reports	April 22, 2010	--	13%	--	--	9%	--	12%
Rasmussen Reports	March 24, 2010	--	12%	--	--	10%	--	8%
Denno-Noor Research	March 3–5, 2010	--	13%	--	--	6%	6%	11%
EPIC-MRA	February 22–25, 2010	--	17%	--	--	7%	12%	8%
Detroit Free Press	November 12–17, 2009	20%	6%	6%	2%	2%	--	--
EPIC-MRA	October 11–15, 2009	33%	--	3%	2%	5%	--	--
Marketing Resource Group	September 12–20, 2009	40%	--	--	9%	8%	--	--

=== Debate ===
2010 Michigan gubernatorial election Democratic primary debate
No.	Date	Host	Moderator	Link	Democratic	Democratic
Key: P Participant A Absent N Not invited I Invited W Withdrawn						
Key: P Participant A Absent N Not invited I Invited W Withdrawn					Virg Bernero	Andy Dillon
1	Jun. 21, 2010	WOOD-TV	Suzanne Geha; Brian Sterling	C-SPAN	P	P

=== Results ===
Results by county Bernero: Bernero—70–80%; Bernero—60–70%; Bernero—50–60%; Dillon: Dillon—50–60%

Primary election results
Party	Candidate	Votes	%
Democratic	Virg Bernero	309,235	58.6%
Democratic	Andy Dillon	218,884	41.4%
Total votes		528,119	100.0%

== Republican primary ==
=== Candidates ===
==== Declared ====
- Mike Bouchard, sheriff of Oakland County and nominee for U.S. Senate in 2006
- Mike Cox, Michigan attorney general
- Tom George, state senator
- Pete Hoekstra, U.S. representative
- Rick Snyder, businessman

==== Withdrew ====
- David Kniffen, businessman
- Terri Lynn Land, Michigan secretary of state (became Bouchard's running mate)
- Tim Rujan, Huron County commissioner (failed to qualify)

=== Polling ===
Poll source	Dates administered	Mike Cox	Pete Hoekstra	Mike Bouchard	Rick Snyder	Tom George	David Kniffen
EPIC-MRA	July 29, 2010	24%	23%	10%	26%	1%	--
Detroit News 4/WDIV	July 18, 2010	26.4%	25.6%	11.6%	20.2%	1.8%	--
EPIC-MRA	June 12–15, 2010	26%	24%	16%	20%	2%	--
Public Policy Polling	May 25–27, 2010	17%	19%	15%	20%	9%	--
EPIC-MRA	May 22–26, 2010	18%	30%	16%	17%	2%	--
Rasmussen Reports	April 22, 2010	13%	28%	9%	14%	--	--
Rasmussen Reports	March 30, 2010	13%	27%	6%	18%	--	--
Marketing Research Group	March 10–15, 2010	21%	21%	10%	20%	1%	-
Denno-Noor Research	March 3–5, 2010	12%	28%	8%	18%	2%	--
EPIC-MRA	February 22–25, 2010	21%	27%	10%	12%	1%	--
Mitchell Research & Communications	November 17–19, 2009	27%	24%	12%	3%	3%	--
Detroit Free Press	November 12–17, 2009	15%	21%	13%	5%	3%	--
EPIC-MRA	October 11–15, 2009	28%	29%	--	14%	3%	2%
Marketing Resource Group	September 12–20, 2009	27%	23%	15%	--	--	--
Marketing Resource Group	March 4–10, 2009	15%	17%	--	--	--	--

=== Debate ===
2010 Michigan gubernatorial election Republican primary debate
No.	Date	Host	Moderator	Link	Republican	Republican	Republican	Republican	Republican
Key: P Participant A Absent N Not invited I Invited W Withdrawn									
Key: P Participant A Absent N Not invited I Invited W Withdrawn					Mike Bouchard	Mike Cox	Tom George	Pete Hoekstra	Rick Snyder
1	Jul. 13, 2010	WDIV-TV	Devin Scillian	C-SPAN	P	P	P	P	A
2	Jul. 24, 2010	WOOD-TV	Susan Shaw; Brian Sterling	C-SPAN	P	P	P	P	A

=== Results ===
Results by county Snyder: Snyder—40–50%; Snyder—<40%; Hoekstra: Hoekstra—<40%; Hoekstra—40–50%; Hoekstra—50–60%; Cox: Cox—<40%; Cox—40–50%

Republican primary results
Party	Candidate	Votes	%
Republican	Rick Snyder	381,327	36.4%
Republican	Pete Hoekstra	280,976	26.8%
Republican	Mike Cox	240,409	23.0%
Republican	Mike Bouchard	127,350	12.2%
Republican	Tom George	16,986	1.6%
Total votes		1,044,925	100.0%

== Other parties ==
Based on past election performance, the Libertarian Party of Michigan, Green Party of Michigan, and the U.S. Taxpayers Party of Michigan (affiliated with the Constitution Party) have automatic ballot access for the general election, but by state law they must nominate candidates through party conventions rather than primary elections. The Natural Law Party also has automatic ballot access in Michigan, but chose not to run a candidate for governor in 2010.

=== Libertarian Party candidates ===
The Libertarian Party of Michigan nominee was Kenneth Proctor. The nomination was won at the Michigan Libertarian Convention held in Okemos, Michigan on Saturday, May 22, in accordance with Michigan state law. He beat out Bhagwan Dashairya, who had been the 2006 U.S. Taxpayers Party nominee for governor. The delegates ended up selecting Dashairya as the Libertarian nominee for U.S. Congress in District 8.

Proctor's running mate was Dr. Erwin Haas, Maryland of Grand Rapids. Haas received the lieutenant governor nomination unanimously.

=== Green Party candidates ===
The Green Party of Michigan held their statewide nominating convention on July 31 and August 1 in Lansing, and nominated Harley Mikkelson for governor and Lynn Meadows for lieutenant governor.

=== U.S. Taxpayers Party candidates ===
The 2010 U.S. Taxpayers Party of Michigan convention was held on June 26 in East Lansing. In a nearly unanimous vote, Stacey Mathia and Chris Levels were formally nominated as candidates of the U.S. Taxpayers Party of Michigan for the offices of governor and lieutenant governor.

According to Mathia's official press release, "The Convention applauded Mathia's agenda to institute Law-Abiding Constitutional Government and State Sovereignty in order to free the People of Michigan from the political oppression of big government operating outside of its authority."

The press release also stated, "Chris Levels, is currently well known as a radio talk show host on WSNL in the Flint, Michigan area. His last minute nomination speech will be available on Mathia's website. The USTPM Convention gave him a standing applause."

== General election ==
=== Debates ===
On August 12, it was reported that Virg Bernero had accepted invitations to three debates. The first was held on September 21, and was sponsored by WOOD-TV in Grand Rapids. The second debate was held on October 7, and was broadcast on 55 radio and TV stations throughout the state. The third debate was held on October 21, and was sponsored by WXYZ-TV, WWJ (AM) and Crain's Detroit Business. In early September, Bernero offered Snyder a deal of eight debates. Snyder proposed a counter-offer of three debates, which Bernero refused. A Detroit Free Press editorial was critical of Snyder for not agreeing to debates. Bernero called Snyder a wimp for not agreeing to debate him. An impromptu debate developed after Bernero crashed a town hall meeting Snyder was hosting in Westland on September 13. The two sides agreed to an hour-long televised debate, broadcast on October 10 from the studios of WTVS in Wixom. A group of Detroit clergy invited the two major party candidates to a debate there on October 21. Only Bernero accepted the invitation.

=== Predictions ===
Source	Ranking	As of
Cook Political Report	Likely R (flip)	October 14, 2010
Rothenberg	Likely R (flip)	October 28, 2010
RealClearPolitics	Likely R (flip)	November 1, 2010
Sabato's Crystal Ball	Likely R (flip)	October 28, 2010
CQ Politics	Tossup	October 28, 2010

=== Polling ===
Poll source	Dates administered	Virg Bernero (D)	Rick Snyder (R)
Detroit News/WDIV Local 4	October 25–26, 2010	35%	53%
Free Press/WXYZ-TV Channel 7	October 23–26, 2010	37%	55%
Rossman Group/Team TelCom	October 18, 2010	36%	50%
Rasmussen Reports	October 17, 2010	34%	54%
Mitchell Research	October 10, 2010	29%	49%
EPIC-MRA	October 3–7, 2010	29%	49%
Rasmussen Reports	September 20, 2010	38%	51%
Public Policy Polling	September 17–19, 2010	31%	52%
Mitchell Research	August 25–29, 2010	26%	53%
Detroit News	August 9–10, 2010	32%	51%
Rasmussen Reports	August 4, 2010	37%	49%
Rasmussen Reports	June 10, 2010	30%	42%
Public Policy Polling	May 25–27, 2010	28%	44%
EPIC-MRA	May 22–26, 2010	28%	51%
EPIC-MRA	March 28–31, 2010	29%	42%
Michigan Research Group	March 10–15, 2010	26%	42%

=== Results ===
2010 Michigan gubernatorial election
Party	Candidate	Votes	%	±%
Republican	Rick Snyder	1,874,834	58.11%	+15.81%
Democratic	Virg Bernero	1,287,320	39.90%	−16.46%
Libertarian	Ken Proctor	22,390	0.69%	+0.08%
U.S. Taxpayers'	Stacey Mathia	20,818	0.65%	+0.46%
Green	Harley Mikkelson	20,699	0.64%	+0.12%
Write-ins		27	0.00%	0.00%
Majority		587,514	18.21%	+4.15%
Turnout		3,226,088		−15.13%
Republican gain from Democratic		Swing		

==== By county ====
County	Rick Snyder (R)		Virg Bernero (D)		Others	
County	Percentage	Votes	Percentage	Votes	Percentage	Votes
Alcona	63.4%	2,896	33.2%	1,518	3.4%	155
Alger	54.9%	2,075	41.3%	1,559	3.8%	143
Allegan	72.3%	26,990	25.3%	9,438	2.4%	895
Alpena	57.1%	5,753	39.6%	3,982	3.3%	333
Antrim	70.6%	7,295	26.6%	2,753	2.8%	288
Arenac	64.0%	3,521	33.2%	1,825	2.9%	159
Baraga	59.5%	1,578	37.1%	983	3.5%	92
Barry	72.8%	15,300	25.0%	5,243	2.2%	470
Bay	59.6%	23,622	38.2%	15,147	2.2%	868
Benzie	62.3%	4,709	34.7%	2,625	2.9%	222
Berrien	62.2%	28,519	35.3%	16,178	2.5%	1,123
Branch	71.9%	9,183	25.9%	3,306	2.3%	290
Calhoun	62.8%	25,967	35.2%	14,572	2.0%	809
Cass	63.6%	8,879	33.4%	4,661	2.9%	411
Charlevoix	68.8%	7,048	28.5%	2,918	2.8%	283
Cheboygan	67.2%	6,775	29.9%	3,016	2.8%	285
Chippewa	60.7%	7,114	36.4%	4,261	2.9%	345
Clare	64.8%	6,078	32.2%	3,018	3.0%	279
Clinton	65.5%	18,425	32.8%	9,239	1.7%	466
Crawford	66.2%	3,233	30.3%	1,477	3.5%	171
Delta	57.8%	7,558	39.2%	5,122	3.0%	397
Dickinson	63.5%	5,910	33.7%	3,134	2.9%	266
Eaton	59.7%	24,927	38.1%	15,899	2.2%	921
Emmet	69.7%	9,183	27.6%	3,632	2.8%	368
Genesee	46.7%	62,589	51.3%	68,708	2.0%	2,635
Gladwin	64.0%	5,756	33.2%	2,986	2.7%	247
Gogebic	47.3%	2,511	49.4%	2,627	3.3%	176
Grand Traverse	69.6%	23,541	27.8%	9,395	2.6%	879
Gratiot	65.6%	7,234	32.1%	3,537	2.3%	253
Hillsdale	71.2%	10,055	26.0%	3,675	2.7%	388
Houghton	59.9%	7,295	36.8%	4,479	3.3%	397
Huron	69.9%	8,453	27.7%	3,347	2.5%	297
Ingham	49.0%	43,181	48.8%	42,961	2.2%	1,927
Ionia	72.2%	13,269	25.9%	4,754	1.9%	358
Iosco	61.5%	5,943	35.5%	3,435	3.0%	287
Iron	56.0%	2,516	40.6%	1,825	3.4%	154
Isabella	61.7%	9,865	36.1%	5,776	2.2%	345
Jackson	64.1%	31,914	34.0%	16,947	1.9%	961
Kalamazoo	59.4%	46,823	38.7%	30,499	1.9%	1,535
Kalkaska	70.5%	4,096	25.3%	1,467	4.2%	245
Kent	68.9%	134,019	29.4%	57,142	1.8%	3,448
Keweenaw	62.9%	691	34.1%	374	3.0%	33
Lake	60.5%	2,220	36.9%	1,354	2.7%	98
Lapeer	66.8%	19,771	30.7%	9,072	2.5%	752
Leelanau	65.5%	7,467	32.1%	3,655	2.4%	278
Lenawee	61.9%	19,611	35.6%	11,284	2.4%	769
Livingston	75.0%	51,560	23.3%	15,994	1.7%	1,147
Luce	65.9%	1,285	31.5%	615	2.6%	50
Mackinac	65.7%	3,129	31.8%	1,511	2.5%	119
Macomb	61.3%	164,660	36.7%	98,675	2.0%	5,365
Manistee	60.3%	5,513	36.6%	3,352	3.1%	282
Marquette	49.2%	10,690	47.4%	10,301	3.3%	727
Mason	67.0%	6,871	30.7%	3,152	2.3%	239
Mecosta	68.3%	8,079	29.5%	3,485	2.3%	268
Menominee	57.6%	4,114	39.1%	2,797	3.3%	234
Midland	70.1%	20,262	27.8%	8,041	2.1%	615
Missaukee	76.7%	4,057	20.9%	1,105	2.4%	127
Monroe	60.3%	28,911	37.4%	17,917	2.4%	1,139
Montcalm	68.2%	12,170	29.4%	5,237	2.4%	433
Montmorency	67.8%	2,625	28.7%	1,113	3.5%	136
Muskegon	53.9%	27,567	44.1%	22,552	2.0%	1,006
Newaygo	70.2%	10,503	27.4%	4,101	2.4%	364
Oakland	60.1%	272,040	38.4%	173,615	1.5%	6,982
Oceana	67.7%	5,710	30.2%	2,549	2.1%	175
Ogemaw	64.4%	4,866	32.3%	2,442	3.3%	248
Ontonagon	54.9%	1,585	40.8%	1,176	4.3%	124
Osceola	72.1%	5,518	24.9%	1,901	3.0%	229
Oscoda	66.8%	2,079	28.8%	896	4.3%	135
Otsego	70.3%	6,130	26.9%	2,349	2.7%	238
Ottawa	79.1%	71,847	19.3%	17,534	1.6%	1,437
Presque Isle	62.5%	3,427	34.5%	1,892	3.0%	163
Roscommon	65.1%	6,450	31.8%	3,157	3.1%	306
Saginaw	55.7%	37,920	42.6%	29,008	1.7%	1,159
St. Clair	66.0%	34,503	31.4%	16,425	2.6%	1,340
St. Joseph	70.6%	10,794	27.0%	4,126	2.4%	374
Sanilac	71.8%	9,576	25.9%	3,453	2.3%	309
Schoolcraft	56.3%	1,787	40.5%	1,285	3.3%	104
Shiawassee	60.9%	14,245	36.8%	8,595	2.3%	546
Tuscola	66.1%	12,314	31.4%	5,850	2.4%	455
Van Buren	64.1%	13,985	33.3%	7,264	2.7%	579
Washtenaw	48.4%	58,029	49.9%	59,829	1.8%	2,147
Wayne	38.3%	201,424	60.2%	316,514	1.5%	7,812
Wexford	70.5%	7,251	26.3%	2,707	3.1%	320

Counties that flipped from Democratic to Republican

- Alger (largest city: Munising)
- Alpena (largest city: Alpena)
- Arenac (largest city: Standish)
- Benzie (largest city: Frankfort)
- Berrien (largest city: Niles)
- Cass (largest city: Dowagiac)
- Clare (largest city: Clare)
- Clinton (largest city: St. Johns)
- Delta (largest city: Escanaba)
- Gladwin (largest city: Gladwin)
- Gratiot (largest city: Alma)
- Iosco (largest city: East Tawas)
- Iron (largest city: Iron River)
- Jackson (largest city: Jackson)
- Leelanau (largest settlement: Greilickville)
- Lenawee (largest city: Adrian)
- Mason (largest city: Ludington)
- Menominee (largest city: Menominee)
- Oceana (largest city: Hart)
- Ogemaw (largest city: West Branch)
- Ontonagon (largest village: Ontonagon)
- Presque Isle (largest city: Rogers City)
- Roscommon (largest settlement: Houghton Lake)
- Schoolcraft (largest city: Manistique)
- St. Clair (largest city: Port Huron)
- Bay (largest city: Bay City)
- Calhoun (largest city: Battle Creek)
- Eaton (largest city: Charlotte)
- Isabella (largest city: Mount Pleasant)
- Lake (largest village: Baldwin)
- Manistee (largest city: Manistee)
- Monroe (largest city: Monroe)
- Saginaw (largest city: Saginaw)
- Shiawassee (largest city: Owosso)
- Van Buren (largest city: South Haven)
- Kalamazoo (largest city: Kalamazoo)
- Oakland (largest city: Troy)
- Keweenaw (largest city: Ahmeek)
- Houghton (largest city: Houghton)
- Mackinac (largest city: St. Ignace)
- Dickinson (largest city: Iron Mountain)
- Baraga (largest city: Baraga)
- Chippewa (largest city: Sault Ste. Marie)
- Alcona (largest city: Harrisville)
- Tuscola (largest city: Caro)
- Ionia (largest city: Ionia)
- Montcalm (largest city: Greenville)
- Midland (largest city: Midland)
- Muskegon (largest city: Muskegon)
- Luce (largest city: Newberry)
- Crawford (largest city: Grayling)
- Berrien (largest city: Niles)
- Lenawee (largest city: Adrian)
- Ingham (largest city: Lansing)
- Marquette (largest city: Marquette)

== See also ==
- 2010 United States gubernatorial elections
