= Joan Bauer (politician) =

American politician

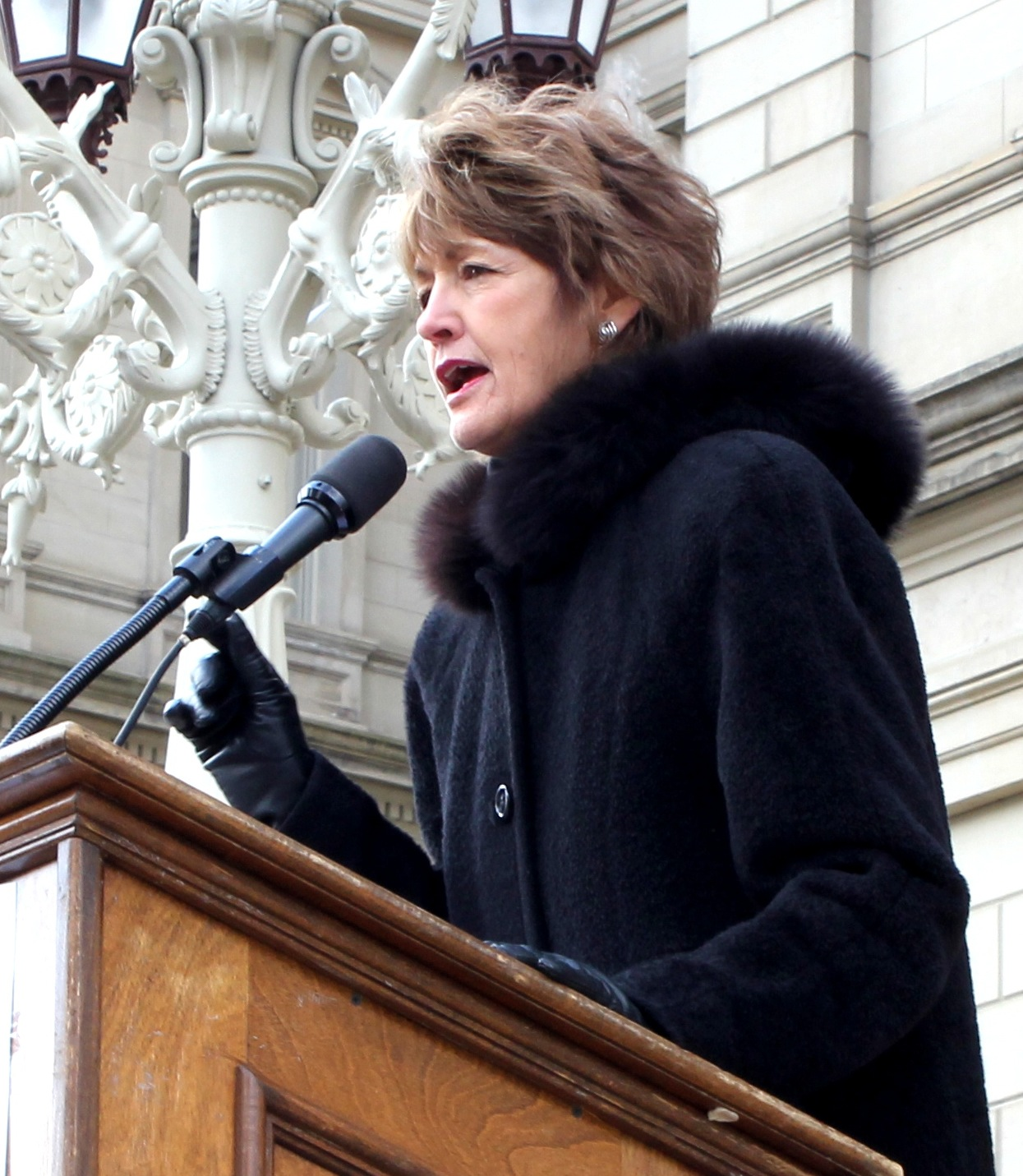
- Bauer in 2011

Member of the Michigan House of Representatives from the 68th district
- In office January 1, 2007 – December 31, 2012
- Preceded by: Michael C. Murphy
- Succeeded by: Andy Schor

Member of the Lansing City Council
- In office 1995–2006

Personal details
- Born: January 21, 1950 (age 76)
- Party: Democratic
- Spouse: Doug Langham
- Education: Western Michigan University (BA)

Joan Bauer (born January 21, 1950) is an American politician who served as a member of the Michigan House of Representatives for the 68th district from 2007 to 2012.

== Education ==
Bauer graduated from Western Michigan University with a Bachelor of Arts degree in history and minors in political science and secondary education.

== Career ==
Bauer was a high school and adult education government teacher and she served as the director of volunteer services at Ingham Regional Medical Center for 21 years. Bauer chaired the Ingham County Women's Commission and served as president of the Michigan Women in Municipal Government from 2004 to 2005.

=== Lansing City Council ===
In 1995, Bauer was elected as a member at-large to the Lansing City Council, and re-elected in 1999, and 2003. She served until 2006, when she resigned to run for the Michigan State House of Representatives.

=== Michigan House of Representatives ===
==== Tenure ====
In her 2006 election to the Michigan House, Bauer defeated first runner-up Jerry Hollister, the son of former Lansing Mayor David Hollister, by nearly six percentage points in the Democratic primary, garnering 32.83% of the vote. Bauer coasted to victory in the general election by receiving 74% of the vote, defeating Republican businessman Harilaos I. Sorovigas.

As a member of the Michigan House of Representatives, Bauer introduced and co-sponsored a number of important bills. Perhaps one of the best known of these is HB 4341, which boasts 33 co-sponsors and would disallow all businesses and restaurants in Michigan from permitting smoking in their establishments. This bill, which provides no exemptions for certain businesses, has been referred to the House Regulatory Reform Committee; due to her efforts and coalition-building, Bauer's colleague, Representative Lee Gonzales, was able to successfully introduce a similar bill on February 19, 2009, which was identical except that it allowed exemptions for Detroit casinos, existing cigar bars, tobacco specialty retail stores, work vehicles and home offices. Bauer was a co-sponsor for this bill, and after months of complex negotiations, was able to see it passed with a bipartisan 73–31 majority. Free from the harmful effects of secondhand smoke, Michigan is now the 38th smoke-free state in the nation.

Bauer sponsored HB 4851 in 2009, would prohibit employers from paying a person less than an amount understood to be of "comparable worth," making doing so a civil rights law violation.

==== Committee and caucus membership ====
Bauer was a member of the House Appropriations Committee. She also served on three subcommittees in the House. She was the chair of the Higher Education Subcommittee, vice-chair of the Community Colleges Subcommittee, and a member of the Economic Development Subcommittee. She was appointed by House Speaker Andy Dillon to serve on the Capitol Committee.

Bauer served as chair of the Capital Caucus, co-chair of the Michigan Legislative Women's Caucus, and co-chair of the Local Government Caucus. As a testament to her skills as a legislator and a leader, all of these caucuses are bipartisan as well as bicameral. She is also a member of several other caucuses, including the Urban Caucus, the Children's Caucus, the Tourism Caucus, the Arts Caucus, and the Fire Caucus.

== Personal life ==
Joan Bauer was formerly married to Doug Langham, the former administrator of vocational rehabilitation in the Michigan Workers Compensation Agency, and they live on Lansing's Westside.
