= Michael C. Murphy (Michigan politician) =

American politician

The Honorable Rev. Dr. Michael C. Murphy

Member of the Michigan House of Representatives from the 68th district 69th district (2001–2002)
- In office January 1, 2001 – December 31, 2006
- Preceded by: Lynne Martinez
- Succeeded by: Joan Bauer

Personal details
- Born: June 21, 1952 Chicago, Illinois
- Died: December 28, 2014 (aged 62) Washington, D.C.
- Party: Democratic
- Education: Chicago Theological Seminary (D. Min., M. Div.); Michigan State University (M.A.); DePaul University (B.A.)
- Occupation: Pastor, politician

Michael C. Murphy (June 21, 1952 – December 28, 2014) was the founder and pastor of St. Stephen’s Community United Church of Christ in Lansing, Michigan, and a former member of the Michigan House of Representatives.

Murphy graduated from DePaul University with a bachelor's degree, from Michigan State University with a master's degree in counseling, and from Chicago Theological Seminary with both a master's degree in divinity and a doctorate of ministry. Ordained by the African Methodist Episcopal Church in 1984, Murphy held dual standing with that church and the United Church of Christ. He founded St. Stephen's in 1987 and served there until being called to the People's Congregational United Church of Christ in early 2009 where he was senior minister.

Murphy's political involvement began in 1997 when he was elected to the Lansing City Council. He served as president in 1999 and 2000. He chaired the public safety committee, served on the Michigan Municipal League's Legislative and Urban Affairs Committee, and the Mayor's Blue Ribbon Committee on Downtown Revitalization. An active participant in politics even before his election to the House, Murphy was one of 100 ministers to visit the White House in advance of the 2000 election to discuss getting out the vote.

Murphy was elected to the House in 2000, succeeding Lynne Martinez, to represent the majority of the City of Lansing. He served until 2006 when term limits precluded him from seeking re-election.

Murphy died on December 28, 2014, in Washington, D.C., aged 62.
