= City Pulse =

Alternative newspaper in Lansing, Michigan, US

- Type: Alternative weekly
- Format: Tabloid
- Owner: Michigan Independent Media Group
- Editor: Sarah Leach
- Founded: 2001
- Language: English
- Headquarters: 1905 E. Michigan Avenue; Lansing, MI 48912
- Circulation: 13,000 (as of 2025)
- Website: lansingcitypulse.com

City Pulse is a free, alternative weekly newspaper in Lansing, Michigan. It was founded by Berl Schwartz, a veteran journalist.

== History ==
City Pulse was founded in August 2001 by Berl Schwartz, its editor and publisher until he sold it in 2025. The editors consider the paper "alternative media" and often feature local news items ignored by the dailies. In 2008, City Pulse was accepted into the Association of Alternative Newsmedia, a trade group that represents alternative newspapers. Regarding the material covered in the paper, Schwartz said, "I guess I've always had a passion for giving the establishment a hard time." In 2013, City Pulse won several content awards from the Michigan Press Association, including Best Special Section for its coverage of the Broad Museum at Michigan State University. It won the same award in 2011 for a special issue on the conversion of the Ottawa Power Station to Accident Fund Insurance Co. headquarters.

On December 6, 2018, City Pulse staffers handed out free joints to celebrate the state's legalization of recreational marijuana.

In July 2025, City Pulse was purchased by Michigan Independent Media Group. The for-profit group's goal is to "preserve local journalism," according to Lonnie Scott, the group's CEO. In October 2025, Schwartz stepped back to a part-time role as "editor and publisher emeritus" under a one-year employment agreement, but as of Dec. 9, 2025, he was no longer credited in the newspaper's masthead. He left the paper in December 2025. In 2026, City Pulse dropped its membership in AAN.

== Staff and circulation ==
City Pulse has five employees, plus a stable of artists and writers that contribute articles, cover art and cartoons for the paper. As of January 2025 City Pulse had a circulation of 13,000 and a readership of about The paper is available free every Wednesday in over 300 locations in Lansing and throughout Ingham County.

City Pulse also maintains a website, www.lansingcitypulse.com, which is updated weekdays with local news overage.

Each year City Pulse holds the "Top of the Town" awards allowing readers to vote for their local favorites in various categories.
