= Virgil Bernero =

American politician

Virg Bernero
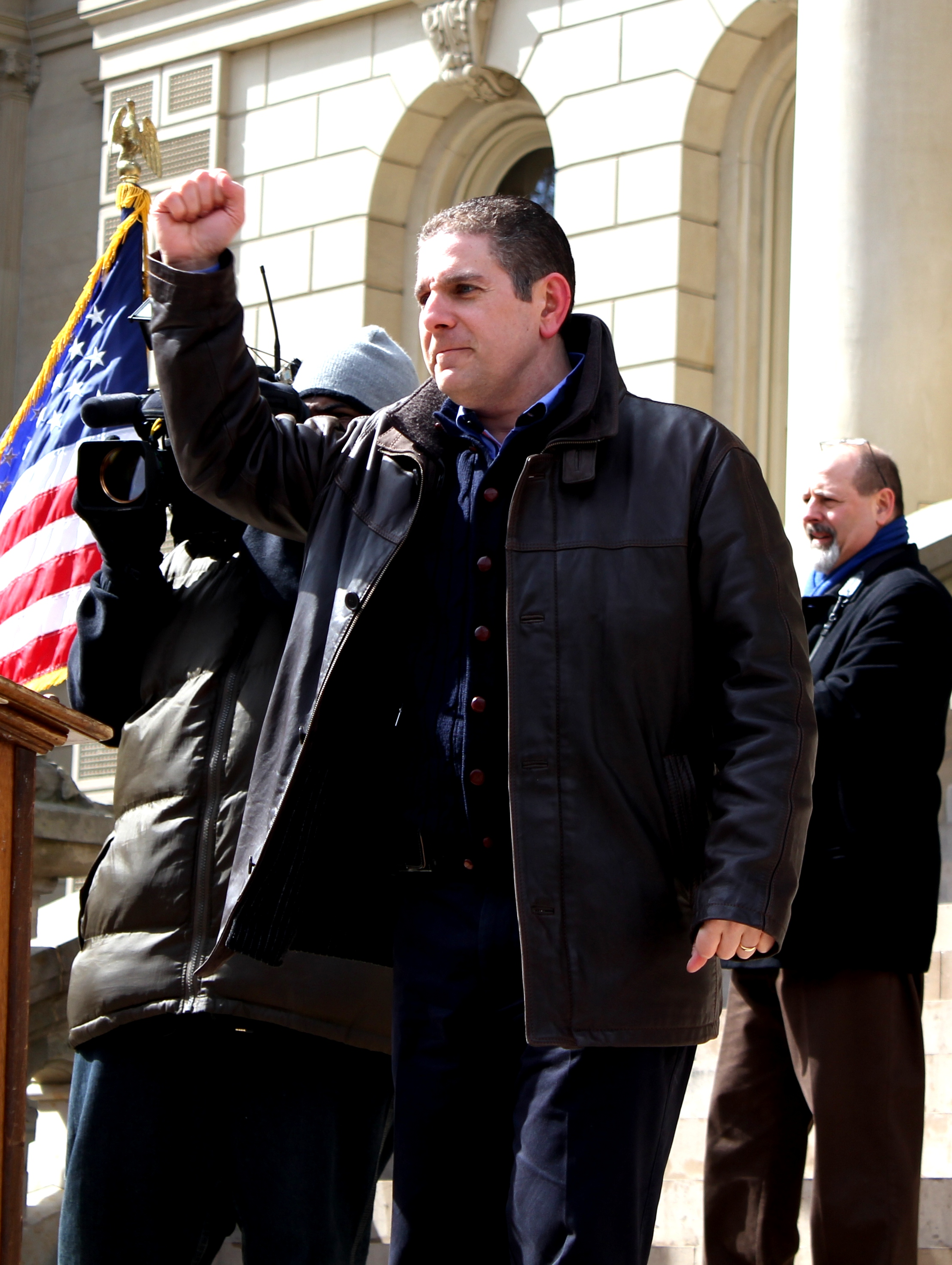

51st Mayor of Lansing
- In office January 1, 2006 – January 1, 2018
- Preceded by: Antonio Benavides
- Succeeded by: Andy Schor

Member of the Michigan Senate from the 23rd district
- In office January 1, 2003 – January 1, 2006
- Preceded by: Joanne Emmons
- Succeeded by: Gretchen Whitmer

Member of the Michigan House of Representatives from the 68th district
- In office January 1, 2001 – December 31, 2002
- Preceded by: Lingg Brewer
- Succeeded by: Michael Murphy

Personal details
- Born: Virgil Paul Bernero; March 31, 1964 (age 62) Pontiac, Michigan, U.S.
- Party: Democratic
- Spouse: Teri Bernero
- Children: 2
- Education: Adrian College (BA)

Virgil Paul "Virg" Bernero (born March 31, 1964) is an American politician and was mayor of Lansing, Michigan, elected on November 8, 2005, and re-elected on November 3, 2009. He is a member of the Democratic Party. Prior to serving as mayor, Bernero served as a legislative aide, an Ingham County Commissioner and as a member of the Michigan House of Representatives and the Michigan Senate. He was the Democratic nominee for Governor of Michigan in 2010, losing in the November 2 general election to Republican Rick Snyder.

== Early life, education ==
Virgil Paul Bernero was born March 31, 1964, in Pontiac, Michigan in the Metro Detroit area. He was the youngest of five children (three sons and two daughters) born to Giulio, an Italian immigrant who arrived in the US in 1948, and Virginia, a first generation Italian-American.

Bernero has said that the diagnosis of schizophrenia in one of his brothers and the death of another brother from AIDS in 1990 (on the same day he was elected to the Ingham County Commission) have helped to shape his life and politics.

While a student at Waterford Mott High School, Bernero was elected class president three times. After graduating from there in 1982, he enrolled at Adrian College (and was also class president there three times), graduating in 1986 with a B.A. in political science.

== Career ==
Bernero served as a legislative aide and an Ingham County, Michigan Commissioner.

=== Michigan State Representative ===
Bernero won a seat in the Michigan House of Representatives in 2000, serving one term before being elected to the Michigan Senate in 2002.

=== Michigan State Senator ===
Bernero was elected to the Michigan Senate on November 5, 2002, and served there until his election as mayor three years later.

While he was a state senator, Bernero appeared in the documentary Fired! (2006) by Annabelle Gurwitch. The film chronicles the experiences of individuals who have been fired from their jobs. In it, Bernero was interviewed about his efforts to pass Michigan Senate Bill 381 of 2005 ("Employee Privacy Protection Act"), which would make it illegal for Michigan employers to fire workers for engaging in otherwise legal conduct during their off-work hours.

=== Mayor of Lansing ===
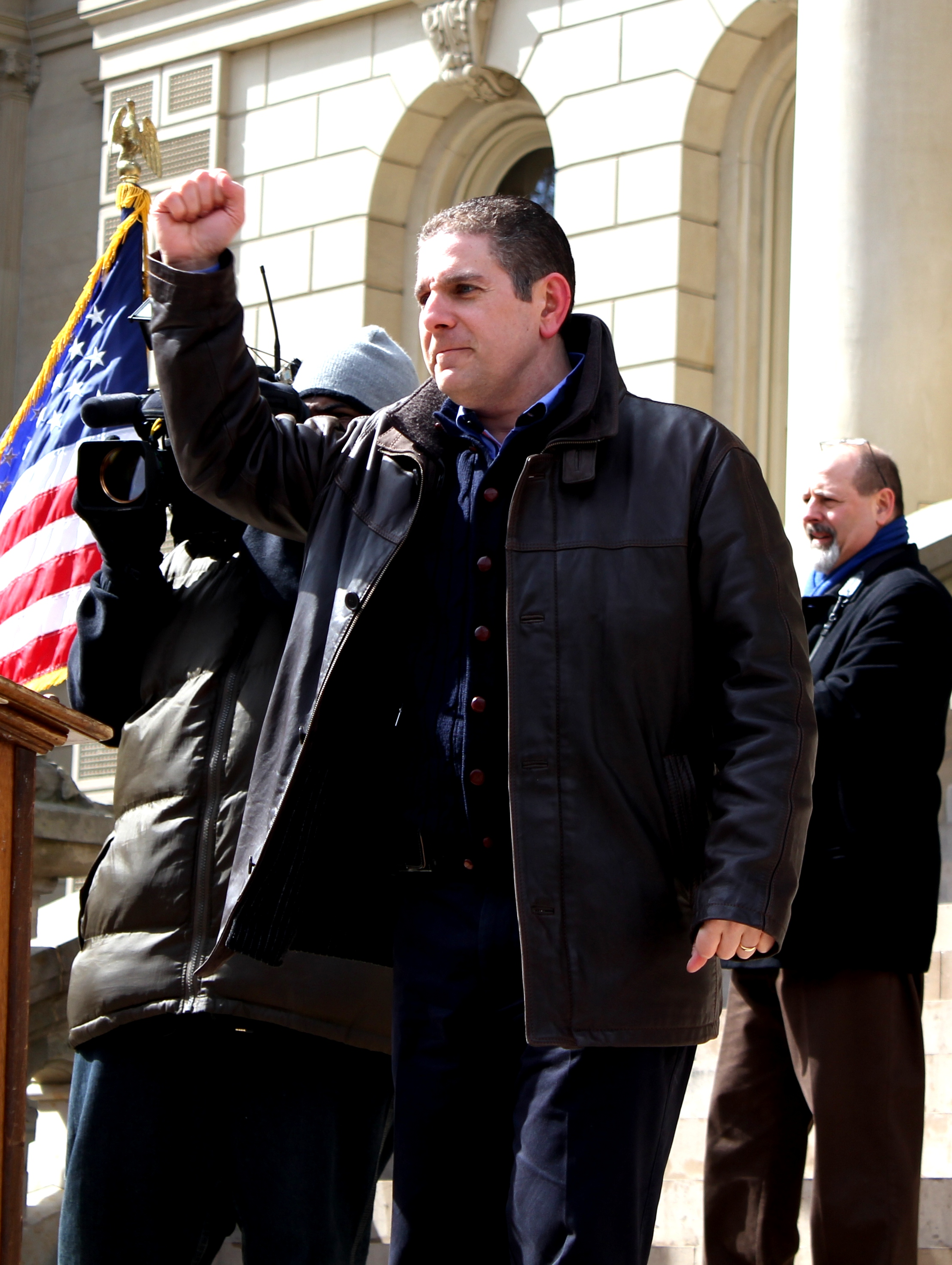
Bernero at a March 2011 student rally in Lansing

Bernero was elected Mayor of Lansing on November 8, 2005, after defeating incumbent mayor Tony Benavides.

Bernero was re-elected as mayor of Lansing in November 2009, winning against opponent Carol Wood.

Bernero was elected for his third term as mayor of Lansing in November 2013, winning against opponent Harold Leeman.

During Bernero's tenure, Lansing received more than $2 billion in new private investments that created or retained more than 12,500 jobs. During potential revenue losses and rising costs, Bernero helped to eliminate more than $80 million in city budget deficits.

His tenure as mayor was not without some criticism, as several political adversaries circulated a petition to have him recalled as mayor. The petition ultimately failed to collect enough signatures to be placed on the ballot.

Bernero announced he would not run for reelection in 2017 to be with his aging father.

=== Campaign for Michigan Governor ===
Bernero officially announced his intention to run for Governor of Michigan on February 8, 2010. On August 3, 2010, Bernero defeated primary challenger Andy Dillon by 90,326 votes or nearly 20 percentage points. In the general election. Bernero lost to Republican candidate Snyder, garnering 39.9% of the vote to Snyder's 58.11%.

During the gubernatorial election, Bernero was a frequent guest on cable news shows, where he was labeled the "Angry Mayor" for his passionate advocacy of his positions. The Lansing Brewing Company subsequently named one of its beers, Angry Mayor IPA, after Bernero.

=== 2021 campaign for Lansing mayor ===
After much speculation throughout 2020, Bernero officially announced his intention to run for the mayor of Lansing in January 2021. Bernero campaigned and continued to fundraise throughout February and early March when harassment and non-consensual touching claims by two women came forward. Bernero issued denials in interviews on radio and television, brushing off the allegations as "character assassination", alleging that "powerful forces that do not want to see me return". Bernero abruptly left the campaign trail with an announcement on Facebook on Sunday April 18, 2021, one day before new allegations from multiple women, including a former staffer, were published.

==== Harassment claims and lawsuit ====
Multiple women came forward about sexual harassment and unwanted touching, starting in 2004 when Bernero was serving in the Michigan Legislature, in 2010, 2013, and 2014 as Mayor of Lansing, with accounts of unsolicited phone calls, groping, and propositions for threesomes.

In June 2021, a former staffer, Elizabeth Hart, whose claims include she fled Michigan to escape Bernero's influence ruined her career, sued him in civil court for damages stemming from his sexual harassment and assault. The lawsuit claimed Bernero grabbed and tugged at her hair, stroked her shoulders and neck, even touching her knee while putting his finger to his lips, and twice touching the staffer's exposed feet, and claiming he "had a foot fetish" and the Plaintiff had "beautiful feet" and pressured her "to drink alcohol he kept in his desk".

Bernero's lawyers argued that the statute of limitations had passed and filed a motion to block an audio recording of conversation between Bernero, campaign manager Elena Greer, and Lansing City Councilmember Kathie Dunbar, from being used as evidence, in which Bernero called Hart a "little girl" and that there was "no question" he had been "inappropriate" with her, and speculates on whether "she enjoyed it", but that he "owes an apology" to Hart for what she had to "endure" and to all the women he has "hurt". Counsel for Bernero claimed in court filings that the recording was "obtained illegally".

On October 12, 2021, the case officially closed after a three line apology from Bernero and a $4,500 settlement. Counsel for Bernero said the outcome "pleased everyone". In an October 15, 2021 statement, Hart called the agreed settlement "a form of justice" and that during the "extremely stressful" lawsuit, she was "petitioned to submit to unnecessary and violating exercises, such as full physical exams and a complete listing of her sexual history, that had no relevance to her degrading experiences with Bernero", and called for a reexamination of sexual assault definitions in Michigan.

== Honors and awards ==
In 2004, Bernero (as a state senator), Rep. Michael Murphy, and Rep. Gretchen Whitmer were jointly awarded the Ray of Light PRISM Award for Outstanding Contributions to the Lesbian, Gay, Bisexual and Transgender Community.

He was awarded an Honorary Doctor of Laws degree from his alma mater Adrian College in 2008.

== Personal life ==
Bernero is married to Teri (née Johnston); they met when both were attending Adrian College. They have two daughters, Kelly and Virginia (named for his mother).

Political offices
Preceded by Antonio Benavides	Mayor of Lansing; 2006–2018	Succeeded by Andy Schor
Party political offices
Preceded by Jennifer Granholm	Democratic nominee for Governor of Michigan; 2010	Succeeded by Mark Schauer
